= Off the Main Sequence =

2005 collection of short stories by Robert A. Heinlein

Off the Main Sequence: The Other Science Fiction Stories of Robert A. Heinlein
- First Edition cover
- Author: Robert A. Heinlein
- Language: English
- Genre: Science fiction
- Publisher: Science Fiction Book Club
- Publication date: November 2005
- Publication place: United States
- Media type: Print (hardcover)
- Pages: 738 + xxiv
- ISBN: 1-58288-184-7
- OCLC: 62596696

Off the Main Sequence: The Other Science Fiction Stories of Robert A. Heinlein (ISBN 1-58288-184-7) is a collection of 27 short stories by American writer Robert A. Heinlein, including three that were never previously collected in book form.

The title is a play on the astronomy concept off the main sequence, and refers to these stories not being part of Heinlein's Future History.

== Table of contents ==
- "Introduction" by Greg Bear
- "Foreword" by Michael Cassutt
- "Editor's Note" by Andrew Wheeler
- "Successful Operation" (as "Heil") by Lyle Monroe, Futuria Fantasia, April 1940
- "Let There Be Light" by Lyle Monroe, Super Science Stories, May 1940
- ""—And He Built a Crooked House—"", Astounding Stories, February 1941
- "Beyond Doubt" by Lyle Monroe & Elma Wentz, Astonishing Stories, April 1941 (*)
- "They", Unknown, April 1941
- "Solution Unsatisfactory" by Anson MacDonald, Astounding, May 1941
- "Universe", Astounding, May 1941
- "Elsewhen" (as "Elsewhere") by Caleb Saunders, Astounding, September 1941
- "Common Sense", Astounding, October 1941
- "By His Bootstraps" by Anson MacDonald, Astounding, October 1941
- "Lost Legacy" (as "Lost Legion") by Lyle Monroe, Super Science Stories, November 1941
- "My Object All Sublime" by Lyle Monroe, Future Fiction, February 1942 (*)
- "Goldfish Bowl" by Anson MacDonald, Astounding, March 1942
- "Pied Piper" by Lyle Monroe, Astonishing Stories, March 1942 (*)
- "Free Men", The Worlds of Robert A. Heinlein, 1966
- "On the Slopes of Vesuvius", Expanded Universe, 1980
- "Columbus Was a Dope", Startling Stories, May 1947
- "Jerry Was a Man" (as "Jerry Is a Man"), Thrilling Wonder Stories, October 1947
- "Water Is for Washing", Argosy, November 1947
- "Nothing Ever Happens on the Moon", Boys' Life, April 1949
- "Gulf", Astounding, November 1949
- "Destination Moon", Short Stories, September 1950
- "The Year of the Jackpot", Galaxy Science Fiction, March 1952
- "Project Nightmare", Amazing Stories, April/May 1953
- "Sky Lift", Imagination, November 1953
- "Tenderfoot in Space", Boys' Life, May 1958
- "All You Zombies—", Fantasy & Science Fiction, March 1959

(*) Previously uncollected in a Heinlein collection
