= The Fantasies of Robert A. Heinlein =

1999 collection of short stories by Robert A. Heinlein

- Author: Robert A. Heinlein
- Cover artist: Peter Gudynas
- Language: English
- Genre: Science fantasy
- Publisher: Tor
- Publication date: 1999
- Publication place: United States
- Media type: Print (hardback & paperback)

The Fantasies of Robert A. Heinlein (1999) is a collection of science fantasy short stories by American writer Robert A. Heinlein.

The contents of the book are exactly two previous collections of Heinlein's short stories: Waldo & Magic, Inc. (1950) and The Unpleasant Profession of Jonathan Hoag (1959), here arranged chronologically in order of publication:

- "Magic, Inc." (1940);
- ""—And He Built a Crooked House—"" (1941);
- "They" (1941);
- "Waldo" (1942);
- "The Unpleasant Profession of Jonathan Hoag" (1942);
- "Our Fair City" (1948);
- "The Man Who Traveled in Elephants" (1957);
- "All You Zombies—" (1959).

The hardcover version has 320 pages and was published by Tor Books on November 15, 1999. The paperback version (from the same publisher) has 352 pages and was published on May 17, 2002.
