= List of existing technologies predicted in science fiction =

This list of existing technologies predicted in science fiction includes every medium, mainly literature and film. In 1964, Soviet engineer and writer Genrikh Altshuller made the first attempt to catalogue science fiction technologies of the time.

Alongside first prediction of a particular technology, the list may include all subsequent works mentioning it until its invention. The list includes technologies that were first posited in non-fiction works before their appearance in science fiction and subsequent invention, such as ion thruster. To avoid repetitions, the list excludes film adaptations of prior literature containing the same predictions, such as "The Minority Report". The list also excludes emerging technologies that are not widely available. The names of some modern inventions (atomic bomb, robot, space station, oral contraceptive and borazon) exactly match their fictional predecessors. A few works correctly predicted the years when some technologies would emerge, such as the first sustained heavier-than-air aircraft flight in 1903 and the first atomic bomb explosion in 1945.

== Literature ==
Work	Author(s)	Publication year	Predicted technology	Name(s) in the work
Comical History of the States and Empires of the Moon	Cyrano de Bergerac	1657	Space rocket	Machine
The Blazing World	Margaret Cavendish	1666	Submarine	Ships that could swim under water
Giphantie	Charles-François Tiphaigne de la Roche	1761	Photography	Unnamed, descriptive
Symzonia: A Voyage of Discovery	Adam Seaborn (Note: Pseudonym, real name is unclear.)	1820	Jet engine	Unnamed, descriptive
Probable Tall Tales	Thaddeus Bulgarin	1824	Aviation (Note: Probable Tall Tales also describe some technologies that were actually invented before, such as "running galoshes", consisting of "iron shoes with springs and wheels under the soles" (the first roller skates were invented in 1760). These are excluded from the list.)	Aerial stagecoaches
Probable Tall Tales	Thaddeus Bulgarin	1824	Printer	Writing machines
Probable Tall Tales	Thaddeus Bulgarin	1824	Kingston valve	Openings with valves for letting water into a special bulkhead in the hold
The United Worlds, a Poem, in Fifty Seven Books	Mark Drinkwater	1834	Android	Androides
The Year 4338: Petersburg Letters	Vladimir Odoyevsky	1835	Rapid transit (subway), electric multiple unit, aviation	Electric carriage (for electric multiple unit), galvanic flying machine (for aviation)
The Wicked Prince	Hans Christian Andersen	1840	Airship	
The Air Battle; A Vision of the Future	Hermann Lang	1859	Remote control devices	
From the Earth to the Moon	Jules Verne	1865	Solar sail, splashdown	Both unnamed, descriptive
The Brick Moon	Edward Everett Hale	1869	Space station	Brick moon
Twenty Thousand Leagues Under the Seas	Jules Verne	1870	Electric submarine, gas-discharge lamp, taser	Submarine Nautilus, Ruhmkorff apparatus, gun
"The Great Electric Diaphragm. Some Account of the Telegraphic System of the Baron O---"	Robert Duncan Milne	1879	Radio	
"The Senator's Daughter"	Edward Page Mitchell	1879	Electric heating	Thermo-electrode
Mizora	Mary Bradley Lane	1880	Synthetic meat	Chemically prepared meat
Robur the Conqueror	Jules Verne	1886	Autogyro, helicopter	Flying engine Albatross
"In the Year 2889"	Jules Verne or Michel Verne	1889	News broadcasting, videotelephony	Phonotelephote (for videotelephony)
Electric Life	Albert Robida	1891	Television, videotelephony, aviation, biological weapons, miniskirt	Telephonoscope (for television), aeronefs-omnibus (for aviation)
Six Thousand Years Hence	Milton Ramsey	1891	Machine translation	
"The Great Brown–Pericord Motor"	Arthur Conan Doyle	1891	Heavier-than-air unmanned aerial vehicle (drone)	Brown–Pericord Motor
The Angel of the Revolution	George Griffith	1893	Air-to-surface missile, radar, sonar, heavier-than-air aircraft flight	Missile boring its way through the air for the centre of the fortress, air-ship Ariel
A Journey in Other Worlds	John Jacob Astor IV	1894	International telephone network	Descriptive
A Journey in Other Worlds	John Jacob Astor IV	1894	Videotelephony	Kintograph or visual telegraph
A Journey in Other Worlds	John Jacob Astor IV	1894	Hidden camera	
A Journey in Other Worlds	John Jacob Astor IV	1894	Phosphorescent paint	Strips of nickel painted white, and showing a bright phosphorescence at night
A Journey in Other Worlds	John Jacob Astor IV	1894	Radar speed gun,	
A Journey in Other Worlds	John Jacob Astor IV	1894	Chemical weapon	Asphyxiating bombs containing compressed gas that could be fired from guns or dropped from the air
Propeller Island	Jules Verne	1895	Audiobook	
The Crack of Doom	Robert Cromie	1895	Atomic bomb or hydrogen bomb	Disintegrating agent
The Island of Dr. Moreau	H. G. Wells	1896	Organ transplantation	Unnamed, descriptive
The War of the Worlds	H. G. Wells	1898	Laser, chemical weapon	Heat-ray (for laser), black and poisonous vapour by means of rockets (for chemical weapon)
When the Sleeper Wakes	H. G. Wells	1899	Military aviation, automatic door	Aeroplanes (for military aircraft)
"The Imp of the Telephone"	John Kendrick Bangs	1902	Videocassette recorder	
"The Land Ironclads"	H. G. Wells	1903	Armoured fighting vehicles, (Note: Although land ironclads are sometimes interpreted as tanks, they are described by Wells as having pedrail wheels rather than continuous tracks.) joystick with firing button	Land ironclads
"Sultana's Dream"	Begum Rokeya	1905	Solar power, seasonal thermal energy storage	Unnamed, descriptive
"With the Night Mail"	Rudyard Kipling	1905	Airmail by airplanes	
The Last Miracle	M. P. Shiel	1907	Hologram	
Red Star	Alexander Bogdanov	1908	Nuclear engine, automated plant	Etheroneph (for nuclear engine)
The War in the Air	H. G. Wells	1908	Military aviation	Fleet of airships
A Columbus of Space	Garrett P. Serviss	1909	Nuclear-powered spaceship	Atomic balloon
"The Machine Stops"	E. M. Forster	1909	Home automation (smart home), television, videotelephony, social media	Cinematophote (for television)
The Emperor of the Air	George Glendon	1910	Wankel engine	
"He of the Glass Heart"	George Allan England	1911	Artificial human heart	
Ralph 124C 41+	Hugo Gernsback	1911	Solar power, television, tape recorder, sound film, videotelephony, radar and spaceflight	Telephot (for videotelephony), actinoscope (for radar)
The Great Aeroplane. A Thrilling Tale of Adventure	Frederick Sadleir Brereton	1911	Jet propulsion	
The World Set Free	H. G. Wells	1914	Atomic bomb, nuclear propulsion	Atomic bomb, atomic engine
Beyond the Earth	Konstantin Tsiolkovsky	1920	Artificial gravity, lunar rover	Artificial gravity (Note: The original Russian term used in the novel (искусственная тяжесть) is slightly different from its modern equivalent искусственная гравитация. However, in English they are translated identically.)
R.U.R.	Karel Čapek	1920	Robots (Note: While similar machines existed before (automatons, Leonardo's robot, etc), R.U.R. is credited with coining the word "robot" as applied to such machines.)	Robots
"The Devolutionist"	Homer Eon Flint	1921	Artificial human heart	
"The Secret of Artificial Reproduction"	Clement Fezandié	1921	Cloning	
"Number 87"	Eden Phillpotts	1922	Discovery of francium	
The Absolute at Large	Karel Čapek	1922	Nuclear reactor	Karburator
Men Like Gods	H. G. Wells	1923	Email, voicemail	Unnamed, descriptive
We	Yevgeny Zamyatin	1924	Interstellar message, specifically Voyager Golden Record (Note: The novel also includes devices similar to CCTV, the street membranes, but they recorded sound rather than video, and thus are excluded from the list.)	Unnamed, descriptive
Metropolis	Thea von Harbou	1925	Robots	Machines
In a Thousand Years	Vadim Nikolsky	1926	Atomic bomb explosion in 1945 (Trinity test)	Atomic explosion of 1945
The Garin Death Ray	Aleksey Tolstoy	1927	Laser (Note: While hyperboloid is described as more powerful than laser, being able to "cut through a railway bridge in a few seconds", it has been regarded as very similar in principle. The Encyclopedia of Science Fiction, however, notes: "For example, Pulp-magazine sf of the 1930s made much of Death Rays; it is rather a dubious vindication to point out that laser beams can now be used as weaponry". Because of that later mentions of death rays are excluded from this list. Nonetheless, laser cutting exists.)	Hyperboloid
Amphibian Man	Alexander Belyaev	1928	Aqua-Lung (Note: Although prototypes existed before, Aqua-Lung appeared after the novel's publication, in 1942.)	Underwater suits with oxygen tanks
The Struggle in Space	Alexander Belyaev	1928	Mobile phone	Wireless telephone
Electropolis	Otfrid von Hanstein	1928	Microwave oven, Global Positioning System (GPS)	
"Evans of the Earth-Guard"	Edmond Hamilton	1930	Vernier thruster	Rocket's side tubes
Paradise and Iron	Miles J. Breuer	1930	Home automation, self-driving car	
"The Black Star Passes"	John W. Campbell	1930	Solar-powered aircraft	Solar engine, one that could be placed in the wings of a plane to generate power
"The Message From Space"	David M. Speaker	1930	Videotelephony (Note: Although videotelephony was not largely available at the time, ikonophone and "two-way television-telephone" emerged in 1927 and 1930, respectively.)	Visiphone
Underwater Farmers	Alexander Belyaev	1930	Diver propulsion vehicle	
Brave New World	Aldous Huxley	1932	4D film	Feelies, works of art out of practically nothing but pure sensation
"Pygmalion's Spectacles"	Stanley Weinbaum	1935	Smartglasses, virtual reality	Magic spectacles (for smartglasses)
The Star KETS	Alexander Belyaev	1936	Space station, extravehicular activity, satellite	
"Sugar in the Air"	Ernest Charles Large	1937	Artificial photosynthesis	
"Helen O'Loy"	Lester del Rey	1938	Domestic robot	Helen O'Loy
"Blowups Happen"	Robert Heinlein	1940	Nuclear power plant	
"Coventry"	Robert Heinlein	1940	Solar vehicle	Vehicle with "sunpower screens"
"Solution Unsatisfactory"	Robert Heinlein	1941	Atomic bomb	U235 in a controlled explosion, a one-ton bomb that would be a whole air raid in itself
"Nerves"	Lester del Rey	1942	Widespread nuclear power	
"Waldo"	Robert Heinlein	1942 (Note: In the same year Heinlein's novel Beyond This Horizon was published credited with predicting waterbed (alongside later Double Star and Stranger In A Strange Land), but it has been known since the 19th century, thus all three novels are excluded from the list.)	Remote manipulator, robot-assisted surgery	Waldo F. Jones' Synchronous Reduplicating Pantograph; later in acknowledgment some remote manipulators were dubbed "Waldos".
"Fakaofo Atoll"	Ivan Yefremov	1944	Underwater television	
"Shadow of the Past"	Ivan Yefremov	1945	Hologram	Light imprint
"A Logic Named Joe"	Murray Leinster	1946	Computer, Internet, server	Logic (for computer), tank (for server)
Space Cadet	Robert Heinlein	1948	Mobile phone (Note: Space Cadet is also credited with predicting microwave oven, but it was demonstrated before, in 1947 by Raytheon.)	
"The Veldt"	Ray Bradbury	1950	Home automation (smart home), 4D film, virtual reality	Happylife Home (for smart home), odorophonics (for 4D film)
"There Will Come Soft Rains"	Ray Bradbury	1950	Robotic vacuum cleaner	Small cleaning animals, all rubber and metal
Foundation	Isaac Asimov	1951	Pocket calculator	
"Rock Diver"	Harry Harrison	1951	Helmet-mounted display	Oscilloscope screen set inside helmet
"The Pedestrian"	Ray Bradbury	1951	Self-driving car	Police car
Islands in the Sky	Arthur C. Clarke	1952	Space station	Space Station, Inner Station
Childhood's End	Arthur C. Clarke	1953	Oral contraceptive, DNA paternity testing	Oral contraceptive, infallible method of identifying the father of any child
Fahrenheit 451	Ray Bradbury	1953	Earphones (earbuds), flatscreen television, automated teller machine (ATM)	Seashells (for earbuds), wall-TV (for flatscreen television), bank which was open all night and every night with robot tellers (for ATM)
The Caves of Steel	Isaac Asimov	1953	Fingerprint scanner	Unnamed, descriptive
The Star Beast	Robert Heinlein	1954	Mobile phone	
The Magellanic Cloud	Stanisław Lem	1955	Internet, smartphone with internet access, additive manufacturing file format, 3D printing	Trion (for internet), pocket receiver (for smartphone), production prescription (for additive manufacturing file format), the automaton (for 3D printer)
The City and the Stars	Arthur C. Clarke	1956	Immersive virtual reality games	Central computer, which virtually ran the city
The Door into Summer	Robert Heinlein	1956	Automated teller machine (ATM), robotic vacuum cleaner, computer-aided design (CAD)	Twenty-four-hour bank (for ATM), Hired Girl (for robotic vacuum cleaner), gismo (for CAD)
"The Minority Report"	Philip K. Dick	1956	Facial recognition system, personalized ads	
The Naked Sun	Isaac Asimov	1956	Flatscreen 3D television, domestic robot	Viewing panels, household robots
Andromeda: A Space-Age Tale	Ivan Yefremov	1957	Borazon, space probe, powered exoskeleton, ion thruster	Borason, (Note: Spelling per novel's English translation by George Hanna, with an "s" instead of a "z". Modern English spelling coincides with the Russian. While the synthesis of borazon was announced in 1957, the novel itself was written in 1955–1956.) geological bomb, robot station (for space probe), jumping skeletons (for powered exoskeletons), ion trigger motors (for ion thrusters)
The Man Without Heart	Oles Berdnik, Yuri Bedzik	1957	Artificial human heart	
"Prospector's Special"	Robert Sheckley	1959	Mobile phone, videotelephony	Telephone, video screen
Return from the Stars	Stanisław Lem	1961	E-reader, audiobook	Opton (for e-reader), lecton (for audiobook)
"The Way You Will Be"	Arkady and Boris Strugatsky	1961	4D film	
Razor's Edge	Ivan Yefremov	1963	Solar-pumped laser	
Podkayne of Mars	Robert Heinlein	1963	Video ads in taxis	
The Age of the Pussyfoot	Frederik Pohl	1965	Smartphone	Joymaker
The Cyberiad	Stanisław Lem	1965	Life simulation game	
The Final Circle of Paradise	Arkady and Boris Strugatsky	1965	Paintball, self-driving car, Bluetooth headset	Liapnik (for paintball)
The Moon Is a Harsh Mistress	Robert Heinlein	1966	Voice user interface, cyberattacks, deepfakes	Computer subverted to attack its owners, computer-generated audio and video fakes used for political purposes
2001: A Space Odyssey	Arthur C. Clarke	1968	Voice user interface, tablet computer	Newspad (for tablet computer)
Stand on Zanzibar	John Brunner	1968	On demand television, laser printer	
Doraemon	Fujiko Fujio	1970	Generative AI	Magazine Maker Set
"The Scarred Man"	Gregory Benford	1970	Computer virus	
Cyborg	Martin Caidin	1972	Robotic prostheses	
When HARLIE Was One	David Gerrold	1972	Computer virus (Note: While internet did not exist at the time, Creeper virus in the ARPANET emerged before, in 1971.)	
Imperial Earth	Arthur C. Clarke	1975	Personalized ads, search engine	Personal messages (for personalized ads), Comsole (for search engine)
The Shockwave Rider	John Brunner	1975	Hacking, computer worm	
One Hundred Years Ahead	Kir Bulychev	1978	E-reader, smartwatch	
The Hitchhiker's Guide to the Galaxy	Douglas Adams	1979	Audio translation device, Wikis	Babel fish
"Burning Chrome"	William Gibson	1982	Internet	
Friday	Robert Heinlein	1982	Internet	
The Descent of Anansi	Steven Barnes, Larry Niven	1982	Tethered satellite	
Neuromancer	William Gibson	1984	World Wide Web, virtual reality, artificial intelligent agents	Cyberspace, Neuromancer, Wintermute
Islands in the Net	Bruce Sterling	1988	Smart shoe	
Paris in the Twentieth Century	Jules Verne	1994 (Note: Written in 1863, first published 131 years later.)	Skyscrapers, gasoline-powered cars, electric street lights, electronic dance music, fax, internet, electric chair, weapons of mass destruction	

== Films and TV series ==
Film	Release year	Predicted technology	Name(s) in the work
Back to the Future and Back to the Future Part II	1985, 1989	Voice user interface, tablet computer, videotelephony, augmented and virtual reality, flatscreen television, fingerprint scanner	
Star Trek: The Next Generation	1987–1994	Smartwatch	
Until the End of the World	1991	High-definition flatscreen television	
Toys	1992	Drone warfare	
Her	2013	AI-generated art (drawing and music), advanced talking AI in video games, AI personalities based on historical characters	Samantha

== See also ==
- Clarke's three laws
- List of emerging technologies
- List of hypothetical technologies
- Materials science in science fiction
- Prophets of Science Fiction
