= The Man Who Sold the Moon (short story collection) =

1950 collection of science fiction short stories by Robert A. Heinlein

- First edition cover
- Author: Robert A. Heinlein
- Cover artist: Hubert Rogers
- Language: English
- Genre: Science fiction
- Publisher: Shasta Publishers
- Publication date: 1950
- Publication place: United States
- Media type: Print (hardback)
- Pages: 299
- OCLC: 1933095

The Man Who Sold the Moon is the title of a 1950 collection of science fiction short stories by American writer Robert A. Heinlein.

The stories, part of Heinlein's Future History series, appear in the first edition as follows:

- Introduction by John W. Campbell, Jr., editor of Astounding Science Fiction
- Foreword by Robert A. Heinlein
- "Let There Be Light" (1940; originally published in Super Science Stories)
- "The Roads Must Roll" (1940; originally published in Astounding Science Fiction)
- "The Man Who Sold the Moon" (1950; first appearance is in this collection)
- "Requiem" (1940; originally published in Astounding Science Fiction)
- "Life-Line" (1939; originally published in Astounding Science Fiction)
- "Blowups Happen" (1940; originally published in Astounding Science Fiction)

Early paperback printings omitted "Life-Line" and "Blowups Happen", as well as Campbell's introduction.

== Reception ==
Boucher and McComas praised the 1950 edition as Heinlein "at his superlative best". In his "Books" column for F&SF, Damon Knight selected The Man Who Sold the Moon as one of the 10 best science fiction books of the 1950s. P. Schuyler Miller said that "Heinlein is a master of concealed technology ... no other writer [has] worked out the scientific minutiae of his settings so fully or so unobtrusively", praising as well Heinlein's skill at crafting "the human engineering details of each situation".

== General and cited references ==
- Chalker, Jack L.; Mark Owings (1998). The Science-Fantasy Publishers: A Bibliographic History, 1923–1998. Westminster, MD and Baltimore: Mirage Press. p. 593.
