= Howard families =

Fictional families by Robert A. Heinlein

The Howard Families are a fictional group of people created by the author Robert A. Heinlein.

According to Heinlein, the Howard Foundation was started in the 19th century by Ira Howard, a millionaire dying of old age in his forties, for the purpose of extending human lifespan. Howard himself did not live to see the outcome; he simply endowed the experiment with his own fortune, and the trustees of the Howard Foundation used the limited scientific knowledge of the time to create a selective human breeding program to encourage, financially, people of long-lived ancestry to have children together. The Howard Foundation is greatly enriched during the Great Depression by knowledge gained through time travel so that they get out of the stock market before the crash and invest in gold rather than cash and are able to reinvest in stocks that rebound after the crash.

The novel Methuselah's Children is focused on the Howard Families and their quest for acceptance on Earth and other planets. According to Methuselah's Children, envy of the Howard Families and the false belief that they have some artificial secret to long life eventually leads the "short-lifers" to develop a therapy for "rejuvenation". Initially, the therapy consists simply of blood replacement (using new blood grown in vitro), but according to Time Enough for Love, this single therapy was eventually expanded to include the gradual replacement of nearly all body parts as well as emotional therapy. Members of the Howard Families generally opt to undergo rejuvenation, thereby extending their already-long lifespans practically indefinitely.

The books Time Enough for Love and To Sail Beyond the Sunset tell the stories of two famous Howard Family members: Lazarus Long, and his mother Maureen Johnson. Lazarus Long also appears in The Number of the Beast and The Cat Who Walks Through Walls.
