= Maureen Johnson (Heinlein character) =

Fictional character

Maureen Johnson Smith Long (July 4, 1882 – "June 20, 1982") most often referred to as Maureen Johnson, is a fictional character in several science fiction novels by American writer Robert A. Heinlein. She is the mother, lover, and eventual wife of Lazarus Long, the longest-living member of Heinlein's fictional Howard families. She is the only character from the "Lazarus Long cycle" to have an entire fictional memoir devoted to her life.

Maureen Johnson and Pixel.

== Background ==
Maureen first appears as a secondary character in the 1973 novel Time Enough for Love. She appears briefly in The Number of the Beast (1980) and The Cat Who Walks Through Walls (1985) and recounts her own life story, and sometimes contradictory versions of events recorded in other Heinlein stories, in 1987's To Sail Beyond the Sunset.

== Early life and marriage ==
Maureen was born in Missouri on July 4, 1882, the daughter of Doctor Ira Johnson, a member of the Howard families. As a young teenager, Maureen discovers this fact from her very frank father who encourages her to seek a husband from among the accepted list of family candidates. She marries Brian Smith and they settle in Kansas City and have several children, all subsidized by the Howard Families foundation.

== Children ==
The most famous of her children is Woodrow Wilson Smith, born November 11, 1912. Woodrow will eventually be known by many names in his long life, the most famous being "Lazarus Long."

Time Enough for Love recounts how, during 1916, Maureen and her father are visited by a mysterious man who calls himself Theodore Bronson. Bronson and Maureen are mentally and physically attracted to one another, and even go on a date and attempt to have sex, but are thwarted by young "Woody," who sneaks along, hidden in the back of the car. Ted Bronson eventually goes off to fight in the war, and is presumed killed. "Bronson" was eventually revealed to Maureen to be her time-traveling son, Woodrow, aka "Lazarus Long."

== Post-divorce business career and "death" ==
When Brian Smith divorces Maureen to marry their daughter-in-law, Maureen strikes out on her own, becomes a board member of D. D. Harriman's Harriman Enterprises, the first company to put a man on the moon in Heinlein's central universe ("The Man Who Sold the Moon"). She also witnesses the introduction of the "rolling roads" ("The Roads Must Roll").

On June 20, 1982, Maureen, just short of her one hundredth birthday, is crossing a street when a truck barrels down on her. She has no time for regrets as she is scooped up in a rescue mission from the future by her son Lazarus, with assistance from Hilda Corners Burroughs, Jacob Burroughs, Zebediah Carter, Dejah Thoris "Deety" Burroughs Carter and their sentient car, Gay Deceiver. The rescue is outlined in the book The Number of the Beast.

== Rejuvenation and Time Corps career ==
She is rejuvenated and first works as a nursing assistant, then a nurse, and eventually a physician and rejuvenator herself. But she regrets not knowing the eventual fate of her beloved father, Dr. Ira Johnson, and on the advice of her co-husband, Jubal Harshaw becomes an agent of the Time Corps (often accompanied by Pixel, the titular "Cat Who Walks Through Walls"). She is kidnapped by the "Committee for Aesthetic Deletions" while on a research trip and held in Kansas City on a previously unknown time-line. Pixel manages to lead Lazarus to Maureen and rescue her from the committee. Then Maureen, Lazarus and the rest of the Long family rescue Ira Johnson from certain death during the Coventry Blitz.

== Worlds without end ==
Maureen is united with her descendants in a massive group marriage in the settlement of Boondock on the planet Tellus Tertius. Her last words in To Sail Beyond the Sunset are:

So we all joined hands in the presence of our children (of course Pixel was there!) and we pledged ourselves to love and cherish our children--those around us, those still to come, worlds without end. And we all lived happily ever after.

== Sources ==
- Time Enough for Love, Heinlein, Robert A., 1973, G. P. Putnam's Sons
- The Number of the Beast, Heinlein, Robert A., 1980, Fawcett
- The Cat Who Walks Through Walls, Heinlein, Robert A., 1985, G. P. Putnam's Sons
- To Sail Beyond the Sunset, Heinlein, Robert A., 1987, G. P. Putnam's Sons
