= Delos D. Harriman =

Character in the fiction of author Robert A. Heinlein

Delos David Harriman, known as D.D. Harriman, is a character in the fiction of science fiction author Robert A. Heinlein. He is an entrepreneurial businessman who masterminded the first landing on the Moon as a private business venture. His story is part of Heinlein's Future History.

Harriman's first appearance in print was in the story "Requiem" which described his death while pursuing his dream of landing on the Moon himself. Having opened space to humankind he was, like Moses, denied the sight of his promised land by a combination of health and legal issues. At the end of his life, Harriman decides to clandestinely arrange to go to the Moon himself. Harriman meets two spacemen, Captain James (Mac) McIntyre and Engineer Charles (Charlie) Cummings, who are down on their luck and giving rocketship rides at county fairs. He secretly hires them and pays to have an old orbital ship purchased and upgraded for a flight to the Moon. To finance this, he liquidates his financial holdings without explanation. His actions cause his nieces and nephews to take him to court for a competency hearing. Harriman fails to show up for the hearing and joins the two spacemen as they prepare the ship at a secret desert location. A deputy marshal locates them, but, when he arrives and finds them preparing for a hurried departure in the modified ship, is knocked out by Charlie Cummings. The spacemen give the old man his last wish. He barely survives the trip, and dies shortly after landing. Charlie buries Harriman's space-suited body on the surface of the Moon and scrawls his epitaph on the tag from an oxygen bottle. It is Robert Louis Stevenson's "Requiem", which is inscribed on his own headstone in Samoa.

Under the wide and starry sky,
Dig the grave and let me lie:
Glad did I live and gladly die,
And I laid me down with a will!
This be the verse you grave for me:
Here he lies where he longed to be;
Home is the sailor, home from sea,
And the hunter home from the hill.

Charlie and Mac then abandon the ship and begin the thirty-mile trip to Luna City.

In the later publication, The Man Who Sold the Moon, Harriman is in his prime. Determined to carry out his vision of a private-venture rocket to the Moon, he buys, bullies, finagles, and deceives anyone who stands in his way. His partners, who respect his successes if not his methods, think of him as the last of the old robber barons, or perhaps the first of the new ones. At the end of that story, published later than its sequel, he is left behind as the first colonization team leaves for the Moon.

Harriman is long married, but his marriage takes second place to his business. When raising money for his venture, he warns Mrs. Harriman that they may close down their extensive underground apartments (built for safety during the so-called "Crazy Years") and live only in the above ground parts of the house. He also warns her that she may have to relearn the art of running a house without servants.

Heinlein's last novel, To Sail Beyond the Sunset, consists of the memoirs of Maureen Johnson, mother of Lazarus Long, and thus includes considerable detail about the twentieth century of Lazarus's home timeline. We learn that Maureen was involved in Harriman's Moon project as the mistress of his partner George Strong, a director of Harriman's corporation, and a last-minute benefactor.

While the character only appears in the three Heinlein works, the name "Harriman" appears throughout Heinlein's "Future History" stories, in the names of various foundations and trusts founded by the character.

Heinlein's choice of the name 'Harriman' may be in reference, or very loosely inspired by, E.H. Harriman (the railroad baron) or Averell Harriman (businessman and diplomat). The Harriman family was particularly well known at the time of Heinlein's writing, with Averell Harriman having held several high-profile government positions during World War II.
