= Waldo & Magic, Inc. =

1950 book containing two novellas by Robert A. Heinlein

Waldo and Magic, Inc.
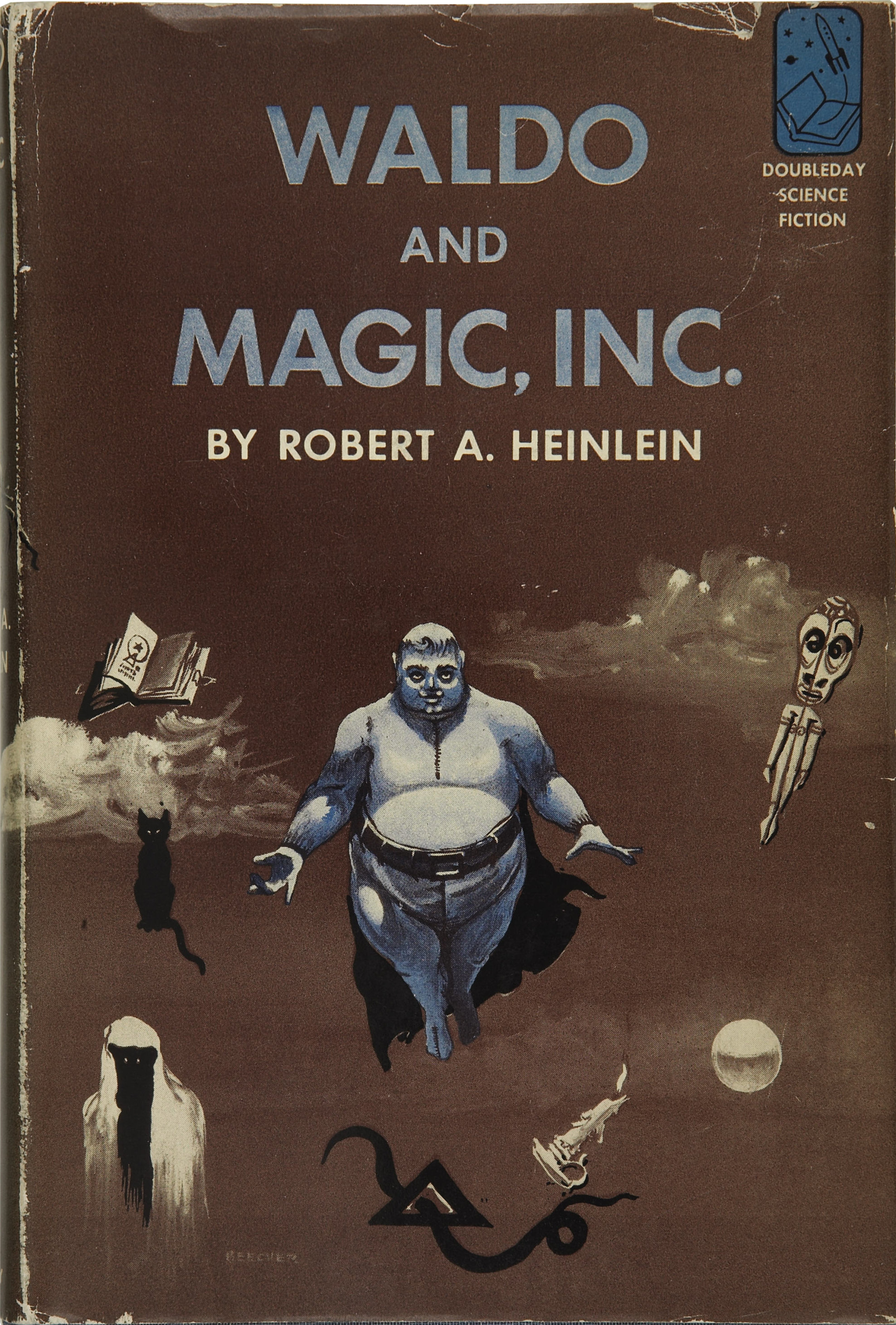
- First edition
- Author: Robert A. Heinlein
- Language: English
- Genre: Science fiction, fantasy
- Publisher: Doubleday
- Publication date: 1950
- Publication place: United States
- Media type: Print (hardback & paperback)

Waldo and Magic, Inc. is a book containing two eponymous novellas, one science fiction, one fantasy, by American writer Robert A. Heinlein. It was published in 1950.

In 1999, Tor Books published The Fantasies of Robert A. Heinlein, an omnibus containing stories from Waldo and Magic, Inc. and The Unpleasant Profession of Jonathan Hoag.

Waldo and Magic, Inc. was later republished separately by Baen Books in 2014.

== Contents ==
- "Waldo" (1942; originally published in Astounding Science Fiction)
- "Magic, Inc." (1940; originally published in Unknown)

== Reception ==
L. Sprague de Camp recommended the collection highly, praising Heinlein for "his prodigality of invention, his shrewd grasp of human nature and his versatile knowledge of law, politics, business and science."
