= A Bathroom of Her Own =

- Short story by Robert A. Heinlein
- Language: English
- Genre: Historical

Publication
- Published in: Expanded Universe
- Publication type: Short Story Collection
- Publisher: Ace Books
- Media type: Print (Hardback & Paperback)
- Publication date: 1980

"A Bathroom of Her Own" is a short story by Robert A. Heinlein about a political campaign in the U.S. after World War II. Written in 1946, it was unpublished until printed in Heinlein's Expanded Universe (1980). The story has no science fiction or fantasy elements.

Heinlein wrote in a foreword: "Any old pol will recognize the politics in this story as the Real McCoy. Should be. Autobiographical in many details. Which details? Show me a warrant and I'll take the Fifth". Another political story of Heinlein's is "Our Fair City" (1949). Heinlein had a cynical view of politics from his experiences with Upton Sinclair's 1934 campaign for Governor of California and his own at the receiving end of supposed dirty tricks during a failed 1938 election campaign for the California State Assembly.
