= Assignment in Eternity =

1953 collection of novellas by Robert Heinlein

- First Edition cover
- Author: Robert A. Heinlein
- Cover artist: Ric Binkley
- Language: English
- Genre: Science fiction
- Publisher: Fantasy Press
- Publication date: 1953
- Publication place: United States
- Media type: Print

Assignment in Eternity, is a collection of four science fiction and science fantasy novellas by American writer Robert A. Heinlein, first published in hardcover by Fantasy Press in 1953. The stories, some of which were revised somewhat from their original magazine publication, were:

- "Gulf" (written and published in 1949 in Astounding Science Fiction, October–November 1949).
- "Elsewhen", (written in 1939 and first published in 1941 in Astounding Science Fiction of September 1941 as "Elsewhere" by Caleb Saunders)
- "Lost Legacy" (written in 1939 but first published in 1941 in Super Science Stories, November 1941 as "Lost Legion" by Lyle Monroe)
- "Jerry Was a Man" (written in 1946 and published in 1947 in Thrilling Wonder Stories, October 1947 as "Jerry Is a Man")

Heinlein dedicated the book "To Sprague and Catherine": L. Sprague de Camp (his friend and science fiction author) and his wife Catherine Crook de Camp.

Assignment in Eternity was almost immediately picked up for mass market paperback publication by New American Library's Signet line and is currently (as of 2007) offered by Baen Books in trade paper format, with a republication of Heinlein's Future History chart, even though none of the stories falls into the Future History.

The four stories are loosely related as speculation on what—that we are not already aware of—makes one a human. "Jerry Is a Man" makes the most straightforward examination of the theme, a court making a legal ruling on the human rights of genetically engineered intelligent creatures. "Gulf", a story connected by its story materials to Kuttner's Baldy stories and Wilmar Shiras' In Hiding, suggests that superior individuals already living among us might become a new step in hominid evolution; "Lost Legacy" suggests that every person has unused paranormal abilities that can be awakened by esoteric training comparable to that used by the supermen of "Gulf". "Elsewhen" suggests that the human mind is not bound to our here-and-now "slum of space-time" but can go voyaging into alternative timetracks of possibility. Although written in 1939, using materials popularized by J. W. Dunne, the story has gained new currency in the wake of the Wheeler-Everett "Many Worlds" hypothesis.

The story materials of all four novellas were revisited by Heinlein in later, more expansive novels. A number of figures of "Lost Legacy", for example, are carried into Stranger in a Strange Land (1961), a book which ultimately could be said to have the same theme as the 1939 novella. Situations and individuals from both "Gulf" and "Jerry Was a Man" are examined in Friday (1982). And the "multiverse" concept first explored in "Elsewhen" gets very full treatment in Heinlein's last novels, particularly The Number of the Beast (1980), The Cat Who Walks Through Walls (1985) and To Sail Beyond the Sunset (1987).

== Reception ==
Boucher and McComas were unenthusiastic about the collection, saying it contained "two lightweight and entertaining novelets and two pretty weak short novels." P. Schuyler Miller similarly found the stories "not up to the best in the "Future History" series or the author's recent teen-age books." The New York Times reviewer Villiers Gerson reported the collection evidenced Heinlein's status as "one of the ablest craftsmen writing science fiction."
