= The Case of the Toxic Spell Dump =

Fantasy novel by Harry Turtledove

- Author: Harry Turtledove
- Cover artist: Stephen Hickman
- Language: English
- Genre: Fantasy
- Published: 1993 (Baen)
- Publication place: United States
- Media type: Print (paperback & hardcover)
- ISBN: 0-671-72196-8

The Case of the Toxic Spell Dump is a fantasy novel by American writer Harry Turtledove, published by Baen Books in December 1993, and reprinted in June 2000. Ebook editions were issued by Gateway/Orion in August 2013 and Open Road Integrated Media in June 2015.

== Premise and setting ==
While having some aspects of an alternate history, it is mainly a work of science fantasy depicting a world where spells, pragmatically used by some to achieve the same results as the use of technology, call upon a spectrum of major to minor deities of the present to the past that are functioning when called upon or omni-present and restricted to local use or having a greater area of influence. Spells are not toxin-free and can have an ill effect on the environment when the appropriate deities and if certain practices are not considered, disaster can follow.

The book is set in a recognizable present-day United States (specifically, in a very recognizable analogue of Los Angeles), with many present-day technologies and institutions having a magical equivalent (for example, the analogue of the CIA is staffed by actual, literal spooks, and computers use a multitude of imps instead of microchips). The title refers to magic spells that can have toxic side-effects, much the same as industrial practices in our world; therefore, there is the need for a place where those toxins can be dumped to avoid damaging the environment.

The book also employs many of the conventions of the hard-boiled detective novel, transposed to this setting. The protagonist, EPA (Environmental Perfection Agency) agent David Fisher, is assigned a case that would appear to need little attention and a simple solution soon becomes complicated and dangerous.

== Reception ==
The novel was reviewed Carolyn Cushman in Locus #396, January 1994, John C. Bunnell in Dragon Magazine, March 1994, and Peter Heck in Asimov's Science Fiction, June 1994.

== See also ==
- Magic, Inc. – 1940 science fantasy novella by Robert Heinlein
- Operation Chaos (novel) – 1971 science fantasy fixup novel by Poul Anderson
