= My Object All Sublime =

Novel by Robert A. Heinlein

"My Object All Sublime" is a science fiction short story written by Robert A. Heinlein, originally printed under the pen name Lyle Monroe, in the February 1942 issue of Future magazine. Its plot follows an invisible man through his adventures.

The title is taken from Gilbert and Sullivan's The Mikado:

"My object all sublime I shall achieve in time —
To let the punishment fit the crime —
The punishment fit the crime;
And make each prisoner pent
Unwillingly represent
A source of innocent merriment —
Of innocent merriment."

Heinlein considered this story one of his "stinkeroos", according to the Heinlein Society, which lists it with the other two on their "Frequently Asked Questions About Robert A. Heinlein, His Works" Web Page. Published copies of this story are very difficult to find, and along with "Beyond Doubt" and "Pied Piper", "My Object All Sublime" comprises "The Lost Three" stories written by Heinlein. The three were included in the 2005 posthumous Heinlein collection Off the Main Sequence.
