= The Man Who Sold the Moon =

1950 science fiction novella by Robert A. Heinlein

- Front cover of the Shasta First Edition hardcover collection
- Author: Robert A. Heinlein
- Language: English
- Genre: Science fiction
- Publisher: Shasta Publishers
- Publication date: 1950
- Publication place: United States
- Media type: Print (Hardback & Paperback)

The Man Who Sold the Moon is a science fiction novella by American author Robert A. Heinlein, written in 1949 and published in 1950. A part of his Future History and prequel to "Requiem", it covers events around a fictional first Moon landing in 1978 and the schemes of Delos D. Harriman, a businessman who is determined to personally reach and control the Moon.

== Plot ==
Delos David "D. D." Harriman, "the last of the Robber Barons", is obsessed with being the first to travel to—and possess—the Moon. He asks his business partner, George Strong, and other tycoons to invest in the venture. Most dismiss Harriman's plans as foolhardy: Nuclear rocket fuel is scarce as the space station that produces it blew up, also destroying the only existing spaceship. The necessary technology for a chemical-fueled rocket stretches the boundaries of current engineering. The endeavor is both incredibly costly and of uncertain profitability. One skeptic offers to sell "all of my interest in the Moon [...] for fifty cents"; Harriman accepts and tries to buy the other associates' interests as well. Strong and two others agree to back his plans.

The technical problems are solvable with money and talent. To solve the tougher financial problems, Harriman exploits commercial and political rivalries. He implies to the Moka-Coka company, for example, that rival soft drink maker 6+ plans to turn the Moon into a massive billboard, using a rocket to scatter black dust on the surface in patterns. To an anti-Communist associate, he suggests that the Russians may print the hammer and sickle across the face of the Moon if they get to it first. To a television network, he offers the Moon as a reliable and uncensorable broadcasting station.

Harriman seeks to avoid government ownership of the Moon. As it passes directly overhead only in a narrow band north and south of the equator, he uses a legal principle that states that property rights extend to infinity above a land parcel. On that basis, Mexico, Central and parts of South America, and other countries in those latitudes around the world, have a claim on the Moon. The United States also has a claim due to Florida and Texas. By arranging for many countries to assert their rights Harriman persuades the United Nations to, as a compromise, assign management of the Moon to his company.

Money remains the main difficulty. Harriman liquidates his assets, risks bankruptcy, damages his marriage, and raises funds in numerous legitimate and semi-legitimate ways; "I", he says, "would cheat, lie, steal, beg, bribe—do anything to accomplish what we have accomplished". Children donate money for a promise of all contributors' names engraved on a plaque left on the Moon. The names, however, will be microscopic in size. Harriman sells land and naming rights to craters, and plans to sell postal covers canceled on the Moon to collectors. He starts rumors that diamonds exist in moondust, intending to secretly place gems in the rocket to convince people that the rumors are true. Harriman will strenuously deny that the diamonds are from the Moon, being merely part of a scientific experiment; he expects people not to believe him, but he will not be guilty of actual fraud.

Harriman wants to be on the first flight of the Pioneer but the ship only has room for one pilot, Leslie LeCroix. The multistage rocket launches from Peterson Field, near Colorado Springs, Colorado, lands on the Moon, and returns to Earth. Harriman is the first to open the rocket's hatch; the canceled postal covers were left behind to save weight and he needs to get them aboard surreptitiously. They let examiners find the diamonds; nobody believes it when Harriman says he put them there himself. Later, in private, the pilot shows Harriman diamonds that he actually found on the Moon.

As Harriman predicted, once the first flight succeeds, many seek to invest in his venture to make more flights using a catapult launcher built on Pikes Peak. The next flight will begin a lunar colony. Harriman intends to be on the ship, but the majority owners of the venture object to his presence on the flight; he is too valuable to the company to risk in space. The rocket leaves without Harriman, who "looks as Moses must have looked, when he gazed out over the promised land".

== Related works ==
The Man Who Sold the Moon is also the title of two collections of Heinlein's short stories. Both collections include "Let There Be Light", "The Roads Must Roll", and "Requiem"; the first also includes "Life-Line" and "Blowups Happen".

Although the 1950 science fiction film Destination Moon is generally described as being based on Heinlein's 1947 novel Rocket Ship Galileo, the story in fact bears a much closer resemblance to The Man Who Sold the Moon. However, the technology of The Man Who Sold the Moon is very different: its rocket is multi-staged, while Destination Moon uses a single-stage-to-orbit spaceship that takes off and lands vertically, both on Earth and the Moon. (Dialogue in the film makes it very clear that the spaceship is nuclear powered.)

The novella also inspired David Bowie's 1970 song "The Man Who Sold the World", in both its title and its central themes.

== Influence on other Heinlein works ==
Harriman appears in "Requiem" as an old man who has still not been able to go to the Moon. It was published in 1940, 11 years before The Man Who Sold the Moon.

The name "Harriman" reappears in many Future History stories as the name of various businesses and foundations, indicating that Harriman's impact on that timeline is significant. The name is also used in Variable Star, a novel outlined by Heinlein but written by Spider Robinson following Heinlein's death; the novel diverges from the Future History.

== See also ==
- Fred Brooks's 1975 book The Mythical Man Month quotes the exchange between Harriman and his chief engineer as an example of a "technical director as boss and producer as right-hand man" relationship.
- Joe Haldeman's 1977 short story "A Time to Live" was an homage to The Man Who Sold the Moon, as well as to Heinlein's 1959 story "All You Zombies—".
- Alan Dean Foster's 1983 novel The Man Who Used the Universe follows the machinations of a similarly obsessive and morally neutral man; however, his ultimate goal is not immediately apparent.
- Ben Bova's 1976 novel Millennium, taking place in a Lunar colony, gives a major role to a character named Harriman.

== Sources ==
- Blish, James, writing as William Atheling, Jr. (1970). More Issues at Hand. Chicago. Advent: Publishers.
- Clute, John; Nicholls, Peter (1995). The Encyclopedia of Science Fiction. New York: St. Martin's Press. p. 1386. ISBN 0-312-13486-X.
- Panshin, Alexei (1968). Heinlein in Dimension. Advent: Publishers. ISBN 0-911682-12-0.
