= Saturn (magazine) =

Science fiction, detective, and horror magazine

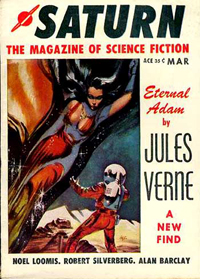
First issue cover, by Leo Summers

Saturn was an American magazine published from 1957 to 1965. It was launched as a science fiction magazine, but sales were weak, and after five issues the publisher, Robert C. Sproul, switched the magazine to hardboiled detective fiction that emphasized sex and sadism. Sproul retitled the magazine Saturn Web Detective Story Magazine to support the change, and shortened the title to Web Detective Stories the following year. In 1962, the title was changed yet again, this time to Web Terror Stories, and the contents became mostly weird menace tales—a genre in which apparently supernatural powers are revealed to have a logical explanation at the end of the story.

Donald A. Wollheim was the editor for the first five issues; he published stories by several well-known authors, including Robert A. Heinlein, H. P. Lovecraft, and Harlan Ellison, but was given a small budget and could not always find stories of high quality. It is not known who edited the magazine after the science fiction issues, but the themes of violence and sex continued to the end of the magazine's run, many stories featuring the torture of women. Sproul finally canceled the title in 1965 after a total of 27 issues.

== Publication history ==
Issues of Saturn showing volume/issue number
Year	Jan	Feb	Mar	Apr	May	Jun	Jul	Aug	Sep	Oct	Nov	Dec
1957			1/1		1/2		1/3			1/4		
1958			1/5					1/6		2/1		
1959		2/2		2/3			2/3		2/4			2/5
1960		2/6				3/1		3/2		3/3		
1961	3/4				3/5				3/6			
1962								4/1				
1963			4/2								4/3	
1964				4/4				4/5			4/6	
1965		5/1				5/2						
Colors indicate the magazine's changes of title: in order, Saturn, The Magazine of Science Fiction; Saturn Web Detective Story Magazine; Web Detective Stories; and finally Web Terror Stories.

Science fiction (sf) magazines proliferated during the 1950s, with dozens of new titles launched during the decade. A. A. Wyn's Ace Magazines group included the Ace News Company, whose general manager was Joe Sproul. Wyn and Robert C. Sproul, Joe's son, were already publishing low-budget magazines such as Sure Fire Detective (later renamed Off Beat Detective Stories) and Cracked, and Robert Sproul decided to add a science fiction title to take advantage of the trend. Sproul recruited Donald A. Wollheim, who worked for Wyn at Ace Books, to help, and the result was Saturn.

The first issue was dated March 1957, with Sproul listed as the editor; Wollheim was "editorial consultant" according to the masthead but actually did all the editing work. The first issue was subtitled "The Magazine of Science Fiction"; for the second issue this was changed to "Magazine of Fantasy & Science Fiction", and the next three were subtitled "Science Fiction and Fantasy".

Sales were disappointing, and Sproul responded by cutting the page count for the third issue from 128 to 112 pages, making it the shortest sf magazine on the market. The schedule was initially bimonthly, but the fourth issue was delayed a month, after which it never returned to a regular schedule. With the sixth issue, dated August 1958, Sproul gave up on science fiction and converted the magazine to detective stories, changing the title to Saturn Web Detective Story Magazine—this was essentially a completely different magazine but, to retain his second-class mailing permit (Note: A second-class mailing permit allowed reduced rates for printed matter such as magazines and newspapers.) for it, Sproul kept Saturn as part of the magazine title.

A few months later the title was shortened to Web Detective Stories. Sales continued to be weak and, in 1962, after a hiatus of almost a year, the title changed again to Web Terror Stories. It published eight issues under that title, finally expiring in 1965, perhaps because the publisher was by then more interested in film-monster magazines. (Note: These were magazines focused on horror movies, and often specifically on the monsters in those movies.)

== Contents and reception ==
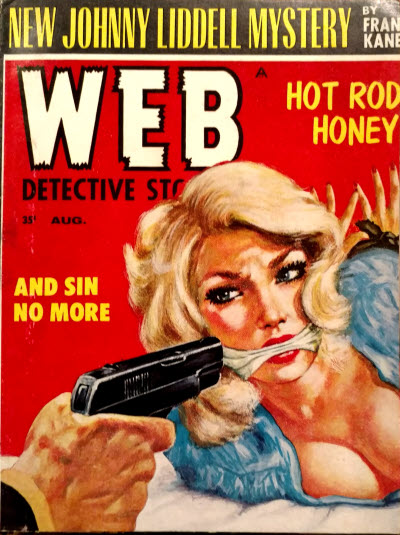
Cover of the August 1960 issue

Sproul gave Wollheim a small budget, and the result was uneven quality. On the cover of the first issue, Wollheim advertised "Eternal Adam", a story set in the far future by Jules Verne that had never previously been translated into English. This was a high-profile find for Saturn, but the rest of the issue was undistinguished: two stories were reprints from the British magazine New Worlds, and one was probably by Wollheim himself, under a pseudonym. Despite the budget constraints, Wollheim was intermittently able to find some good stories. The fourth issue carried a story by Robert Heinlein, "Elephant Circuit", written ten years earlier (later reprinted as "The Man Who Traveled in Elephants"), and Wollheim obtained stories from a wide range of well-known writers, including Harlan Ellison, Cordwainer Smith, Clark Ashton Smith, Marion Zimmer Bradley, Damon Knight, Gordon R. Dickson, Jack Vance, and H. P. Lovecraft. In many cases, according to sf historians Joe Sanders and Mike Ashley, "the stories... gave the suggestion of being dragged out of the back corner of some desk drawer", but they also comment that some material was "surprisingly fresh", and it was popular enough to be ranked the second-favorite magazine in a poll in the fanzine Science-Fiction Times after its first year. The March 1958 issue included Ray Cummings' "Requiem for a Small Planet"; Cummings was one of the most popular sf writers of the 1920s, and this was the last original story of his to appear in a science fiction magazine—and one of the many he set in an infinitesimally small world. Non-fiction articles included "Red Flag Over the Moon", in the final science fiction issue, which in the context of the ongoing Space Race warned readers about the risk of Soviets taking possession of the moon. Sanders and Ashley cite this as an example of Saturn's "hype getting shriller...as the magazine's financial situation worsened".

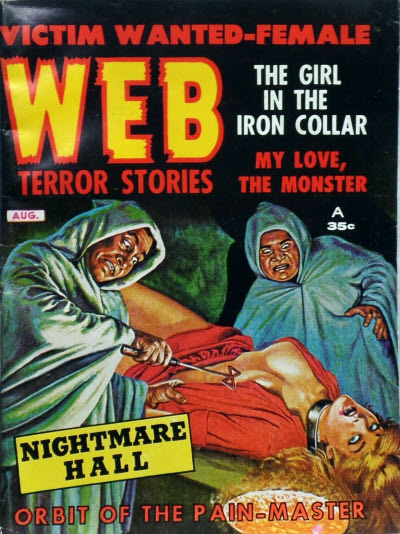
Cover of the August 1962 issue

The detective stories began as hard-boiled fiction, with an emphasis on violence, sex, and titles such as "Jealous Husband" and "Rumble Bait". Edward D. Hoch's "Murder is Eternal", described by mystery critic Jon Breen as "very grim", appeared in the August 1960 issue. With the title change to Web Terror Stories in 1962, the magazine moved further towards sex and sadism as Sproul began publishing weird menace fiction: this was a genre originally popular in the 1930s in which apparently supernatural powers are revealed to have a logical explanation at the end of the story. The occasional science fiction or fantasy story still appeared: the August 1962 issue included "My Love, the Monster" by John Jakes, and Marion Zimmer Bradley's "Treason of the Blood", a vampire story; a third sf story, "Orbit of the Pain-Masters", by Arthur P. Gordon, is described by Sanders and Ashley as "dreadful even by old pulp standards". Subsequent issues, in Sanders' and Ashley's words, "relied on various ways of torturing women" for their material.

The cover of the first issue was by Leo Summers; Sanders and Ashley describe it as "bland" and "uninspiring". Interior art for the first four issues was by John Giunta.

== Bibliographic details ==
Wollheim was no longer the editor once the magazine ceased to carry science fiction, though it is not known who took his place. The magazine was digest-sized throughout its run; the first two issues had 128 pages, and thereafter each issue was 112 pages until the last, which had 160 pages. Each volume included six issues; the numbering was regular except that two consecutive issues were labeled volume 2 number 3. The magazine was priced at 35 cents for all but the last two issues, which were 50 cents. The schedule was initially bimonthly but was rarely regular after the first three issues, with gaps of several months between most issues. The publisher was Candar Publishing Company, Inc., owned by A. A. Wyn and Robert C. Sproul, and based in Holyoke, Massachusetts, with editorial offices in Manhattan.

== Sources ==
- Ashley, Michael (1977). The History of the Science Fiction Magazine: Vol. 3 1946–1955. Chicago, Illinois: Contemporary Books Inc. ISBN 0-8092-7842-1.
- Ashley, Michael (1978). The History of the Science Fiction Magazine: Part 4 1956–1965. London: New English Library. ISBN 0-4500-3438-0.
- Ashley, Mike (2005). Transformations: The Story of the Science-Fiction Magazines from 1950 to 1970. Liverpool: Liverpool University Press. ISBN 0-8532-3779-4.
- Breen, Jon (Spring 2008). "Edward D. Hoch 1930–2008". Mystery Scene (104).
- Breen, Jon L. (2008). A Shot Rang Out: Selected Mystery Criticism. Surinam Turtle Press. ISBN 978-1-60543-168-0.
- Cook, Michael L. (1983). "Saturn Web Magazine of Detective Stories". In Cook, Michael L. (ed.). Mystery, Detective, and Espionage Magazines. Westport, Connecticut: Greenwood Press. pp. 462–463. ISBN 0-313-23310-1.
- Cotter, Robert Michael (Bobb) (2008). The Great Monster Magazines: A Critical Study of the Black and White Publications of the 1950s, 1960s and 1970s. Jefferson, North Carolina: McFarland & Company, Inc. ISBN 978-0-7864-3389-6.
- Jones, Robert Kenneth (1975). The Shudder Pulps: A History of the Weird Menace Magazines of the 1930s. West Linn, Oregon: FAX Collector's Editions. ISBN 0-9139-6004-7.
- Kielbowicz, Richard B. (July 17, 1995). A History of Mail Classification and its Underlying Policies and Purposes (PDF) (Report). Postal Rate Commission.
- Sanders, Joe; Ashley, Mike (1985). "Saturn". In Tymn, Marshall B.; Ashley, Mike (eds.). Science Fiction, Fantasy and Weird Fiction Magazines. Westport, Connecticut: Greenwood Press. pp. 789–790. ISBN 0-3132-1221-X.
