= The Berlin Project (novel) =

2017 novel by Gregory Benford

- First edition cover
- Author: Gregory Benford
- Language: English
- Genre: Alternate history; Science fiction
- Publisher: Saga Press (US)
- Publication date: May 9, 2017
- Publication place: United States
- Media type: Hard cover
- Pages: 466
- ISBN: 978-1-4814-8764-1

The Berlin Project is a 2017 science fiction alternate history novel by American writer Gregory Benford. It was first published in May 2017 in the United States by Saga Press, a division of Simon & Schuster. The novel was nominated for the 2018 Sidewise Award for Alternate History.

The Berlin Project is set in an alternate history during World War II in which the American atomic program completes the atomic bomb a year earlier than in reality, enabling it to be deployed against Germany and bring about a premature end to the war. Many of the characters in the novel are historical figures, including Karl P. Cohen, Harold Urey, Leslie Groves, Richard Feynman, Freeman Dyson, Moe Berg, Werner Heisenberg, Wilhelm Canaris and Erwin Rommel.

== Background ==
The Berlin Project took over four years to research and write. Most of the book's characters are historical figures, and Benford knew many of them personally, including the novel's protagonist, his father-in-law, physical chemist Karl P. Cohen. Benford said the idea for the novel came from his postdoc supervisor, theoretical physicist Edward Teller. Teller had worked in the Manhattan Project during World War II, and told Benford that a decision made in 1942 turned out to be a costly mistake that delayed the development of the atomic bomb by a year.

Benford explained in interviews that the bomb being developed by the atomic program used uranium-235, which had to be enriched from natural uranium. Initially centrifugal separation, an approach developed by Cohen and Harold Urey, was used to extract U-235. But because of persistent mechanical problems with centrifuges, it was abandoned in favor of gaseous diffusion. However, this method took longer to set up than expected, and the project was delayed by a year. Cohen believed that had they been allowed to continue working with centrifuges, the problems they were having would have been overcome, and the bomb would have been ready to deploy in 1944, bringing the war to an early end and saving millions of lives.

== Plot summary ==
Karl P. Cohen becomes involved in the Manhattan Project during World War II to help with the enrichment of uranium for the US atomic bomb program. Cohen and Harold Urey investigate using centrifugal separation, a process they had developed, but continued mechanical breakdowns cast doubt on its viability. In The Berlin Project's alternate timeline, Cohen persists with the centrifuges, and after obtaining private funding and the backing of high-profile people, including Albert Einstein, the problems are resolved and centrifugal separation is chosen as the method of enriching uranium. In mid-1944, the atomic bomb is finished and ready for deployment.

After much debate, the decision is made to drop the bomb on Berlin on the day of the Normandy landings in June 1944. The plan is to kill Hitler in his underground bunker, and to assist the Allied invasion of Europe. But while thousands are killed in Berlin, the bombing of the capital has far less of an impact on Germany than was expected. Hitler was not in Berlin at the time, and he continues to assert his authority. The Allies' advance through France is hampered by a new tactic deployed by Germany. Using newly developed jet aircraft, the Luftwaffe begins dropping radioactive dust obtained from unrefined uranium on the troops. A growing concern is how advanced the Nazi bomb program is, and the fear that Wernher von Braun's V-2 rockets may be armed with nuclear warheads.

In August 1944, Cohen and US Strategic Services agent Moe Berg travel to Switzerland for a secret meeting with German physicist Werner Heisenberg to establish the progress of Germany's atomic bomb project. Heisenberg admits that Germany has no bomb program, but tells them that the idea of deploying radioactive dust came from von Braun, who had read about it in a science fiction short story. (Note: Wernher von Braun got the idea of using radioactive dust against the Allies from "Solution Unsatisfactory", a science fiction short story he had read by Robert A. Heinlein that was published in Astounding Science Fiction in May 1941.) Heisenberg also expresses his unhappiness with Hitler's leadership and gives Cohen the location of Hitler's bunker in Poland. Cohen and Berg also meet with Wilhelm Canaris, chief of the German military-intelligence service, who wants Hitler eliminated so that a surrender can be negotiated.

America completes a second atomic bomb, but it is not dropped on Hitler's bunker. Instead, conventional bombs are used and the dictator is killed. The German army takes over the country and field marshal Erwin Rommel forms a Provisional Government and surrenders to the Western Allies. Germany steps up its war against the Soviets, and using V-2s and radioactive dust, keeps them out of Eastern Europe. The Americans bring the war against Japan to quick end in early 1945 by dropping A-bombs on Okinawa and Hiroshima. In 1963, Cohen receives the French Ordre national de la Légion d'honneur for his role in ending the war with the A-bomb, and Eisenhower and Khrushchev receive the Nobel Peace Prize for signing a treaty banning the development of the more powerful hydrogen bomb.

== Critical reception ==
In a review in Locus magazine, American science fiction writer Paul Di Filippo described The Berlin Project as alternate history in the style of Harry Turtledove that has a "plain yet gripping effectiveness", not unlike Michener or Wouk. Di Filippo approved of Benford's choice of Karl P. Cohen as the book's protagonist, saying that using a "lesser-known ... slightly off-center" scientist from the Manhattan Project adds an interesting perspective to the story. Di Filippo stated that Benford's intimate knowledge of academic science, research and development, and US government projects helps make this novel a "fascinating step-by-step reenactment ... of the scientific and technological journey to make that bomb."

British literature scholar Tom Shippey wrote in The Wall Street Journal that The Berlin Project is all about "[p]hysics and politics, engineering and imagination". He said Benford skillfully "express[es] the sheer excitement of new science and the human tension of making a case [for] ... centrifuges, on which the future of the world depends." Publishers Weekly called The Berlin Project an "intriguing alternate history thriller" The reviewer said Benford makes the book's technical details "accessible to the lay reader" and "brings to life" the Manhattan Project's scientists and physicists. But they described Cohen's deployment in the front towards the end of the book as "a stretch".

Jerry Lenaburg described The Berlin Project as "a fascinating combination of science fiction, espionage thriller, and military history". Reviewing the novel at the New York Journal of Books, Lenaburg said the "wonderful blend" of historical figures and fictional characters are "all handled in a completely realistic and believable manner". He noted that Benford uses his rich academic background to describe the development of the bomb in detail, but did find those sections rather "laborious" and felt that too much time was spent on them. However, once the alternate timeline is established, Lenaburg said the story "proceeds at a brisk pace ... with style and intelligence".

American science fiction writer and critic, Norman Spinrad liked the book's technical detail. In a review in Asimov's Science Fiction, Spinrad said he thought he had "a pretty good knowledge" of the science behind the Manhattan Project, but stated that he ended up learning so much more from Bedford's book. Spinrad called the novel "a fascinating true history", adding that Benford "manages to ... make the science and technology and its personal and political conflicts and tensions dramatically exciting". Spinrad opined, "no writer I can think of combines such scientific sophistication ... with literary and characterizational sophistication as Gregory Benford does."
