= Nothing Ever Happens on the Moon =

- Short story by Robert A. Heinlein
- Country: United States
- Language: English
- Genre: Science fiction

Publication
- Published in: Boys' Life
- Publication date: April and May 1949

"Nothing Ever Happens on the Moon" is a science fiction short story by American writer Robert A. Heinlein, published in April and May 1949 in Boys' Life, a magazine of the Boy Scouts of America, who jointly hold copyright with Heinlein, dated 1976. The story is about a boy who tries to become an Eagle Scout on the Moon. It is approximately 30 pages long (13,000 words) as collected in Expanded Universe (1980). The story was again collected in Off the Main Sequence (2005).

Though the story is not usually counted among the Future History stories, Heinlein wrote in a foreword in Expanded Universe that "This story is compatible with the so-called 'Future History' series. It is also part of my continuing post-War-II attempt to leave the SF-pulp field and spread out." Heinlein wrote a "teleplay" or treatment, date uncertain but possibly sometime in 1959. It was not published or produced.

== Setting ==
The story is set on the Moon, in the mid 21st century or later. During the adventure, Heinlein weaves in many explanations of problems, details and consequences of surviving on the moon under harsh lunar conditions, such as vacuum, temperature extremes, the extended lunar "day" and reduced gravity.

== Plot summary ==
Bruce is an Eagle Scout from Colorado on his way to Venus with a three-week layover on the Moon. He hopes to qualify as an Eagle Scout (Luna) and then go on to become an Eagle Scout (Venus), the first triple Eagle. Shortly after his arrival on the Moon things get off to a rocky start when he gets a hard time from the troop he is assigned to, because nobody, not even the scoutmaster, believes he can make the grade. But he is taken good care of by another scout, Sam, as the troop suits up for a hike. After some amount of bounding and a short ski over powdery dust, the troop builds a pressurized shelter for sleep.

The next day they hike to Base Camp, which are some caves roughly but adequately furnished with an oxygen-producing hydroponic garden, solar panels, and sealed pressure. From here Sam and Bruce go on a two-person hike across rough terrain, up a cliff face and down another.

Disaster strikes when the pitons break loose and Sam is injured in a fall. Bruce rigs a makeshift toboggan to haul Sam and they set out across the plain. A second catastrophe sees them falling into one of numerous dust-filled sinkholes, trapping them in a cavern. At first Sam loses hope, but Bruce is steadfast. After trying to find a way out through the cave and trying to shift the dustpile to expose the hole they fell through, nothing works. Their air is running out; as Bruce gets discouraged it is Sam's turn to bolster their courage. Bruce tries again to find a route out of the caverns and finally gets them onto the surface, where Bruce repeats "M'aidez" (Mayday) into his radio as their air fails; but just in time they are found by the troop.

As Bruce is recuperating, the scoutmaster tells him that they will get him ready for the Lunar Eagle examination in two weeks' time.

== Bibliography ==
- James Gifford, ed. (2000). "The New Heinlein Opus List" (PDF). Heinlein Opus. Citrus Heights, CA: Nitrosyncretic Press.
