= The Unpleasant Profession of Jonathan Hoag (collection) =

1959 collection of science fantasy short stories by Robert A. Heinlein

- First Edition cover
- Author: Robert A. Heinlein
- Cover artist: W.I. van der Poel
- Language: English
- Genre: Science fantasy
- Publisher: Gnome Press
- Publication date: 1959
- Publication place: United States
- Media type: Print (hardcover)
- Pages: 256
- ISBN: 9780425050521
- OCLC: 4623994

The Unpleasant Profession of Jonathan Hoag is a collection of science fantasy short stories by American writer Robert A. Heinlein. Published by The Gnome Press in (1959), the collection was also published in paperback under the title 6 × H.

== Contents ==
- "The Unpleasant Profession of Jonathan Hoag" (1942)
- "The Man Who Traveled in Elephants" (1957)
- "—All You Zombies—" (1959)
- "They" (1941)
- "Our Fair City" (1948)
- "'—And He Built a Crooked House—'" (1941)

The stories in this collection were also published in The Fantasies of Robert A. Heinlein (1999).

== Reception ==
Rating it 4.5 stars out of five, Galaxy reviewer Floyd C. Gale described the volume as "a delightful book".

== General sources ==
- Chalker, Jack L.; Mark Owings (1998). The Science-Fantasy Publishers: A Bibliographic History, 1923–1998. Westminster, MD and Baltimore: Mirage Press, Ltd. p. 308.
