= The Man Who Traveled in Elephants =

1948 short story by Robert A. Heinlein

"The Man Who Traveled in Elephants" is a short story written in 1948 by Robert A. Heinlein. It was first published as "The Elephant Circuit" in the October 1957 issue of Saturn Magazine. It later appeared in two Heinlein anthologies, The Unpleasant Profession of Jonathan Hoag (also titled 6xH; 1959) and The Fantasies of Robert A. Heinlein (1999).

Though this story was not typical of the subject matter of most of Heinlein's writing, it was Heinlein's favorite. It has had a mixed reception compared to his other works. Spider Robinson selected it as one of his life-time favorite stories, and included it in his anthology Best of All Possible Worlds on that basis. Alexei Panshin said that the story "...is a mistake, a sloppy, sentimental fantasy that I suspect was written at the very beginning of Heinlein's career and then went without a buyer until 1957".

The story can be viewed as an early manifestation of Heinlein's World as Myth, which featured prominently in his last novels.

The protagonist is a widower who once was a traveling salesman working with his wife. The two of them continued to travel after retirement, scouting territory in order to sell elephants. It becomes clear that these travels were not seriously intended to sell elephants, but were rather a way to continue the life the two had previously enjoyed. On their travels the two of them were accompanied by a collection of imaginary animals.

The story is usually described as a fantasy. Even though the tone of the story is realistic it could be considered magic realism.

== See also ==
- The Fantasies of Robert A. Heinlein
