= Karl P. Cohen =

American physical chemist

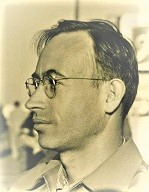
- Born: February 5, 1913; Brooklyn, New York
- Died: April 6, 2012 (aged 99); Palo Alto, California
- Known for: Manhattan Engineer District Project; A Promise Unfulfilled
- Scientific career
- Fields: Chemistry, Physical and Mathematical

Karl Paley Cohen (February 5, 1913 – April 6, 2012) was a physical chemist who became a mathematical physicist and helped usher in the age of nuclear energy and reactor development. He began his career in 1937 making scientific advances in uranium enrichment (isotope separation) as research assistant to Harold Urey, who discovered deuterium–the heavy isotope of hydrogen. Cohen worked within the Columbia group of physicists that included Harold Urey, Enrico Fermi, Leo Szilard, Isidor Isaac Rabi, John R. Dunning, Eugene T. Booth, A. Von Gross and others)–all pioneers of nuclear energy.

In 1942, the Manhattan Engineer District Project was established at Columbia University, and research began on various approaches for separating out the fissionable uranium isotope, U-235. Cohen developed the theory for the now-universal method of centrifugal isotope separation for enriching uranium, but was deeply involved also with the theory of gaseous diffusion, and literally wrote the book about both methods.

Cohen and Urey were convinced that the Uranium Committee had made the wrong choice in 1942 by picking gaseous diffusion instead of centrifuges to produce U-235 for the atom bomb, and thus extended the war by a year. In 1944, Cohen left Columbia and went to work for Standard Oil Development Company to advise on nuclear energy.

Edward Teller’s autobiography Memoirs reflects positively on Cohen and Urey's centrifuge method for producing U-235 when he writes: “What if we had the atomic bomb a year earlier? The easiest and least expensive method of separating isotopes, a method used throughout the world today, is based on a centrifuge procedure that Harold Urey proposed in 1940. General Leslie Groves chose the diffusion method instead. Karl Cohen, Urey’s able assistant during that period, believes that Groves’ decision delayed the atomic bomb by a year. If Dr. Cohen is right, atomic bombs of the simple gun design might have become available in the summer of 1944 and, in that case, would surely have been used against the Nazis. Atomic bombs in 1944 might have meant that millions of Jews would not have died, and that Eastern Europe would have been spared more than four decades of Soviet domination.”

In 1948, Cohen became technical director for H.K. Ferguson's Atomic Energy Division, which was building the Brookhaven, Long Island, nuclear reactor. By 1952, Cohen was a founder, vice president and operating manager of Walter Kidde Nuclear Laboratories (WKNL), a privately funded research facility formed to commercially develop nuclear power. The lab's principal contract was with the Atomic Energy Commission for R&D on reactors, and it established many industry standards, especially regarding slightly enriched uranium and water moderated reactor concepts.

Cohen's long association with General Electric began in 1955, at first as a consultant, then as a manager involved with advanced engineering, advanced products, breeder reactor development, and operational planning. In 1973 Cohen was appointed Chief Scientist of G.E.'s commercial nuclear department. After his retirement in 1978, Cohen consulted for companies such as G.E., Boeing, and Exxon, and organizations such as the Institute for Energy Research, Scientists and Engineers for Secure Energy and the Electric Power Research Institute. Cohen also continued to be active on committees, at conferences, and in more informal peer review of technology and policy papers. He also taught intermittently at Stanford during this time, and donated his papers to the Stanford Library (M1798, Karl Cohen Papers). Karl Cohen died of natural causes in 2012. His last published paper was in Science in 2002, but due to his vast knowledge of the field, he continued to be a source of information on nuclear energy and nuclear policy for several years after the paper.

Cohen had a dream of bringing safe, abundant and affordable energy to the world. His paper published in 1992 in the International Journal of the Unity of the Sciences, Volume 5, Number 3 entitled "A Promise Unfulfilled" argues that before the potential of nuclear fission as a limitless source of energy for earth's societies can be reached, there must first be disarmament and nuclear weapons must be destroyed.

== Biography ==
Cohen was born in Brooklyn, New York to Jewish parents Joseph Cohen and Ray (Rachel) Paley Cohen. He had one older sibling, sister Matila Cohen (Simon), 10/11/1908 – 9/22/1997. At age five, Cohen survived the Spanish Flu but in retrospect felt that it permanently changed his overall health. At age 17 [1930] his father Joseph, who had wanted him to study medicine, died of Crohn's Disease; this discouraged Cohen from medical study. Instead he pursued chemistry which had been a great interest of his in high school (Erasmus Hall High School in Brooklyn’.

He then declined a full scholarship at Cornell University and instead attended Columbia University in order to stay with his recently widowed mother. Cohen continued at Columbia, earning a Phi Beta Kappa in his junior year and completing his bachelor's degree in Chemistry with Honors in 1933, Master's in 1934, and PhD in 1936, both also in Chemistry (thesis advisor: Charles Beckman]. His greatest academic interests had evolved toward physics and mathematics, but finances prohibited changing his major. He often mentioned that as a college student he never attended lectures, but preferred studying on his own and then passed exams – being largely self-taught.

When he completed his doctorate at age 23 his sister encouraged him to travel. He went to France in 1936 and enrolled at the Sorbonne (University of Paris) where he met his future wife, Marthe-Hermance Malartre, a journalism student who was running a hiking club. He traveled widely in 1937, going as far as Russia, but returned to New York in the fall of 1937 to job hunt so he could marry. He couldn't work as a chemist in industry, where Jewish surnames were generally unwelcome. Ultimately, Columbia professor and Nobel laureate Harold Urey hired him as research assistant, beginning years of successful collaboration and personal friendship.

Cohen returned to France in the summer of 1938. With the Third Reich threatening to start a general war in Europe, he and Marthe decided to marry quickly, and on September 21 caught a ship (the Normandie) from Le Havre to New York. The crossing was fraught with drama: as the tail end of the 1938 hurricane battered the ship, rumors circulated aboard that a German U-boat was trailing them. They settled into an apartment in New York on Amsterdam Ave., very close to Columbia and the Pupin building where he was based from 1940-44. This and other labs were consolidated and renamed the Special Alloyed or Substitute Alloy Materials Labs (SAM Labs), the precursors to the Manhattan Project.

Karl and Marthe had three children: Martine, born 10/14/1939; Elisabeth, born 4/6/1943, and Beatrix, born 10/11/1948. In 1943 they bought nine acres of forested land on Long Island, near Smithtown. The land cost $550, which they paid in 10 installments. The name of the buyer was Marthe Malartre, to avoid pervasive anti-semitic problems. They installed a log cabin and dug a well with a hand pump. All lighting was from kerosene lamps, and big blocks of ice for the ice box were delivered periodically. They bought a used black Plymouth and hoarded their gasoline rations for weekends in the woods. Karl developed an interest in mushroom hunting and gardening.

After their second child was born, Karl and Marthe thought of moving out of the city. He left the Project in 1944 for a job with Standard Oil Development Company in Bayway, New Jersey. Urey and Fermi had homes in New Jersey, and Karl tried to buy a house in the town of Elizabeth. Unfortunately, they were not able to find a neighborhood that accepted Jews.

In 1946 the family traveled to Oak Ridge, Tennessee for three months, as Karl sought to immerse himself more in reactor technology.

Karl and Marthe bought a 1949 two-toned brown Hudson, shocking the owners of all the other cars in the parking lot at H.K. Ferguson, which were standard black.

In 1950, The family moved to a house and garden in Bayside, a small suburban town on Long Island. There was a full basement, with room for cold-war food storage, and a darkroom where Karl developed his black and white photographs. Other hobbies included wine-making, gardening, and playing the piano. By 1952, Karl was working in Garden City, Long Island, at the Walter Kidde Nuclear Laboratory along with W.I Thompson, a close friend since the Standard Oil days.

In 1956, the family moved to Palo Alto, California, where Cohen was Manager of General Electric's new Advanced Engineering facility in Sunnyvale. He became a devoted cactus collector, filling his garden with a variety of specimens, meticulously tending to them.

Post retirement, Cohen consulted for the next 12 years and was involved in reactor development in France, Germany, and Japan and the USA. He drove German cars due to promises made when GE coordinated with the German nuclear program (his BMW license plate read PU-239).

Karl and Marthe traveled extensively throughout the West, combining cactus with photography, until Marthe became incapacitated in 1988. Karl retired from his consulting, and took over running the household.

Marthe died in March 2010 after a long illness, ending their 71-year marriage. Two years later Karl died in Palo Alto of natural causes at age 99.

Hobbies/other interests: Karl Cohen was a classical pianist and mastered works by Mozart, Chopin, Schubert and others. His favorite composer was Bach, and he spent many hours perfecting the Art of the Fugue. Early in his life he had debated becoming a professional concert pianist. He surprised his family by acquiring an organ during retirement in order to do justice to many of Bach's works.

== In popular culture ==
In Gregory Benford's 2017 alternate history novel, The Berlin Project, Groves instead elects to pursue the centrifuge procedure proposed by Urey and Cohen, resulting in a U-235 bomb available by the summer of 1944. This weapon is used to bomb Berlin on the same day as the Normandy Landings in 1944. This ultimately brings the war to an end several months earlier than in reality and, securing Nazi Germany's surrender before the Soviet Union reaches Germany territory, prevents a complete Soviet domination of Eastern Europe.

== Works ==
=== Books ===
- Cohen, Karl (March 8, 2015). Murphy, George (ed.). The Theory of Isotope Separation as Applied to the Large Scale Production of U235. Ishi Press. ISBN 978-4871877060.

=== Patents ===
- Centrifuge for separating gas mixtures (U.S. Patent No. 2,536,423)
- Centrifuge apparatus (U.S. Patent No. 2,947,472)
- Method of centrifuge operation
- Cohen, K. (January 1958). "CHARTING A COURSE FOR NUCLEAR POWER DEVELOPMENT". Nucleonics (U.s.) Ceased Publication. 16 (1). OSTI 4337071.
- Process of producing energy by nuclear fission US 3284305 A, Harold C Urey, Cohen Karl, Frank T Barr.

=== Papers and articles ===
Science and science fiction of reprocessing and proliferation

- SciTech Connect

Van der Waals' Forces and the Vapor Pressures of Ortho‐ and Parahydrogen and Ortho‐ and Paradeuterium

- The Journal of Chemical Physics 7, 157 (1939); DOI 10.1063/1.1750404.

==== Operation Sunrise ====
- Cohen, K.; Zebroski, E., 1959, OSTI Identifier 4290692.

==== Nuclear Power ====
- Nuclear Power, The Resourceful Earth.

A Re-Examination of the McMahon Act, Karl Cohen, Pages 7–10 | Published online: 15 Sep 2015

- Bulletin of the Atomic Scientists, Volume 4, 1948 - Issue 1 “During the war Dr. Cohen was director of the theoretical division of the Manhattan Project Laboratory at Columbia,”

Atomic Power as a Risk Venture, Karl Cohen, Pages 305-308 | Published online: 15 Sep 2015

- Bulletin of the Atomic Scientists, Volume 9, 1953 - Issue 8, DOI 10.1080/00963402.1953.11457462.
