= Beyond Doubt =

1941 science fiction story written by Robert A. Heinlein

Beyond Doubt is a science fiction story written by Robert A. Heinlein, originally printed in Astonishing Stories in April 1941 under the pen name "Lyle Monroe and Elma Wentz".

It was published again in 1984 as by Heinlein in Election Day 2084: Science Fiction Stories on the Politics of the Future (edited by Isaac Asimov and Martin H. Greenberg), and posthumously in 2005 in the Heinlein collection Off the Main Sequence.

== Plot ==
The short story is prefaced by an excerpt from an article about Professor J. Howard Erlenmeyer, who claims to have solved the mystery of the Easter Island statues, saying they were beyond doubt religious artifacts.

On the continent Mu, in the province of Lac, a governor is about to be elected. Robar, Clevum and Dolph are three campaign workers trying to get Talus elected, but every time they have an idea to counter the smear campaign from incumbent governor Vortus, their boss Oric claims Talus is so noble that he won't allow it. Finally they decide to distribute stone statue caricatures (huge noses and bat ears) of Vortus to the polling places at election day. Oric agrees and says he will get a priest to levitate the statues, but no priest ever arrives. The three workers realize Oric has sold them out. In a last-ditch attempt, they recruit an alcoholic ex-priest to perform the levitation, but he only manages to scatter the statues over a short distance before succumbing to a drunken stupor. Admitting defeat, Clevus states that he sometimes thinks that what their country needs is an earthquake.
