= Requiem (short story) =

- Short story by Robert A. Heinlein
- Country: USA
- Language: English
- Genre: science fiction

Publication
- Published in: Astounding
- Publication date: January 1940

"Requiem" is a short story by American writer Robert A. Heinlein, a sequel to his science fiction novella "The Man Who Sold the Moon", although it was in fact published several years earlier than that story, in Astounding, January 1940. The story was also performed as a play on October 27, 1955, on the NBC Radio Network program X Minus One.

It is also the first story in the retrospective Requiem: New Collected Works by Robert A. Heinlein and Tributes to the Grand Master.

== Plot ==
The story centers around D. D. Harriman, the lead character of The Man Who Sold the Moon. Harriman, a tycoon and latter-day robber baron, had always dreamed of going to the Moon, and had spent much of his career and resources making space flight a practical commercial enterprise. Unfortunately, his business partners prevented him from taking the early flights because they could not risk the public face of their company. Now an old man, Harriman has still not been to the Moon, a fact that frustrates him, since he lives in a world where space travel is so commonplace that carnivals have their own barnstorming spacecraft. Although no longer bound by his contractual obligations, he is now too old to pass the medical examination needed for space travel.

Very wealthy, Harriman bribes two spacemen to help him get to the Moon after encountering them at a funfair in Butler, a small town outside Kansas City, Missouri (and Heinlein's birthplace), where they sell rides on their old, somewhat run-down ship.

The three of them fight many obstacles, including Harriman's heirs, who want him declared mentally incompetent or senile before he can spend their inheritance. In the end, Harriman finally makes it to the Moon, only to die on the surface soon after landing, content at finally having reached his goal. His body is left there, with his epitaph scrawled on the tag from an oxygen bottle. It is Robert Louis Stevenson's:

Under the wide and starry sky
Dig the grave and let me lie:
Glad did I live and gladly die,
And I laid me down with a will!

This be the verse you grave for me:
Here he lies where he longed to be;
Home is the sailor, home from sea,
And the hunter home from the hill.

— "Requiem" by Robert Louis Stevenson inscribed on his own headstone in Samoa
