= Expanded Universe (book) =

1980 collection of stories and essays by American writer Robert A. Heinlein

- First Edition cover for Expanded Universe
- Author: Robert A. Heinlein
- Language: English
- Genre: Science fiction, Nonfiction
- Publisher: Ace Books
- Publication date: 1980
- Publication place: United States
- Media type: Print (hardback & paperback)
- ISBN: 978-0441218837
- LC Class: PS3515.E288 E96

Expanded Universe, The New Worlds of Robert A. Heinlein is a 1980 collection of science fiction stories and essays by American writer Robert A. Heinlein, with a foreword for each. The trade paperback 1981 edition lists the subtitle under other Heinlein books as More Worlds of Robert A. Heinlein because the contents subsume the 1966 Ace Books collection, The Worlds of Robert A. Heinlein. The current volume is dedicated to William Targ.

== Contents ==
=== Volume 1 ===
- "Life-Line" (*)
- "Successful Operation"
- "Blowups Happen" (*)
- "Solution Unsatisfactory" (*)
- "The Last Days of the United States"
- "How to Be a Survivor"
- "Pie from the Sky"
- "They Do It with Mirrors"
- "Free Men" (*)
- "No Bands Playing, No Flags Flying"
- "A Bathroom of Her Own"
- "On the Slopes of Vesuvius"

=== Volume 2 ===
- "Nothing Ever Happens on the Moon"
- "Pandora's Box" (*)
- "Where To?" (1950, 1965, 1980)
- "Cliff and the Calories"
- "Ray Guns and Rocket Ships"
- "The Third Millennium Opens"
- "Who Are the Heirs of Patrick Henry?"
- "Pravda Means Truth"
- "Inside Intourist"
- "Searchlight" (*)
- "The Pragmatics of Patriotism"
- "Paul Dirac, Antimatter, and You"
- "Larger than Life", a tribute to E. E. "Doc" Smith
- "Spinoff", about NASA spinoff technologies
- "The Happy Days Ahead"

=== Notes ===
- Items marked with an asterisk had appeared in The Worlds of Robert A. Heinlein.
- Some editions split Expanded Universe into two volumes.

== Reception ==
Greg Costikyan reviewed Expanded Universe in Ares Magazine #8 and commented that "Expanded Universe is a book for the completist, the Heinlein devotee, and those interesting in seeing what Heinlein the man, rather than Heinlein the writer, actually believes."

== Reviews ==
- Review by Spider Robinson (1980) in Analog Science Fiction/Science Fact, May 1980
- Review by Alexei Panshin (1981) in Omni, April 1981
- Review by Joseph Nicholas (1981) in Paperback Inferno, Volume 4, Number 6
- Review by Jack Williamson (1981) in Omni, July 1981
- Review by Andrew Andrews (1981) in Science Fiction Review, Fall 1981
- Review by Dave Langford (1981) in Foundation, #23 October 1981
- Review by Tom Easton (1981) in Analog Science Fiction/Science Fact, October 12, 1981
