= The Worlds of Robert A. Heinlein =

1966 collection of short stories by Robert A. Heinlein

- First-edition cover
- Author: Robert A. Heinlein
- Cover artist: Jack Gaughan
- Language: English
- Genre: Science fiction
- Publisher: Ace Books
- Publication date: 1966
- Publication place: United States
- Media type: Print (paperback)
- Pages: 189

The Worlds of Robert A. Heinlein is a collection of science fiction short stories by American writer Robert A. Heinlein, published in 1966.

It includes an introduction entitled "Pandora's Box" that describes some difficulties in making predictions about the near future. Heinlein outlines some of the predictions that he made in 1949 (published in 1952) and examines how well they stood up to about 15 years of progress in 1965. The prediction was originally published in Galaxy magazine, February 1952, Vol. 3, No. 5, under the title "Where to?" (pp. 13–22).

Following the introduction are five short stories:

- "Free Men" (written c. 1947, but first published in this collection, 1966)
- "Blowups Happen" (1940)
- "Searchlight" (1962)
- "Life-Line" (1939)
- "Solution Unsatisfactory" (1940)

In 1980, the entire contents of this collection, including an updated version of "Pandora's Box", were included in Heinlein's collection Expanded Universe.
