= Free Men =

Short story by Robert A. Heinlein

"Free Men" (1966) is a science fiction short story by American writer Robert A. Heinlein. It is his last known published short story, succeeding "All You Zombies" (1959). It first appeared in his collection The Worlds of Robert A. Heinlein (1966) and was later collected in Expanded Universe. It is copyrighted by Heinlein in 1966, but was probably written between 1947 and 1950, judging from the foreword in Expanded Universe, which mentions that it was written after Rocket Ship Galileo.

In the story, America has been invaded and occupied after the "20 Minute War". There is a dramatic change in the situation of Barclay Free Company, a small band of resisters.

The story is action-filled, but does pause at moments for a few polemics, the main thrust of which is that free people are free within themselves regardless of outward circumstances. The fierce defense of freedom and American ideals is typical of Heinlein and the period immediately after World War II.
