= Charles-François Tiphaigne de la Roche =

French novelist (1722-1774)

Charles-François Tiphaigne de la Roche, (February 19, 1722 – August 11, 1774), was a French writer.

He was born at Montebourg, Cotentin, studied medicine at the University of Caen and became a physician in 1744.

His novels, written for the most part anonymously, take place in the wake of the great 18th-century philosophical movements of Rationalism and Illuminism, and often mix scientific considerations with cabalistic, magical and alchemical ones.

He anticipated many social and scientific inventions, e.g. photography, synthetic food, and television.

== Bibliography ==
- L'Amour dévoilé, ou le système des simpathistes, Où l'on explique l'origine de l'Amour, des Inclinations, des Simpathies, des Aversions, des Antipathies, etc., 1749.
- Amilec, ou la graine d'hommes, 1753. Translated into English : Amilec, or the seeds of mankind, 1753. Translated by Brian Stableford in 2011 in Amilec ISBN 978-1-61227-033-3
- Amilec, ou la graine d'hommes, nouvelle édition, à Somniopolis, chez Morphée, 1754.
- Amilec, ou la graine d'hommes qui sert à peupler les planètes, par l'A.D.P.***, troisième édition, augmentée très considérablement, à Luneville, aux dépens de Chr. Hugene, à l'enseigne de Fontenelle, 1754.
- "Mémoire sur la culture des Vignes en Normandie", 1758, published in Mémoires de l'Académie de l'Académie des Belles-Lettres de Caen, 1760.
- Questions relatives à l'agriculture et à la nature des plantes, 1759.
- Reprinted with a new title : Observations physiques sur l'Agriculture, les Plantes, les Minéraux et les Végétaux, etc., 1765.
- Bigarrures Philosophiques, 1759.
- Reprinted with a new title : Les Visions d'Ibrahim, 1779.
- Essai sur l'histoire oeconomique des mers occidentales de France, 1760.
- Giphantie, Babylone, 1760 - the French title is the perfect anagram of Tiphaigne.
- Translated into English : Giphantia; or a view of what has passed, what is now passing, and, during the present century, what will pass in the world, translated from the original French, with explanatory notes, 1761. Translated by Brian Stableford in 2011 in Amilec ISBN 978-1-61227-033-3
- L'Empire des Zaziris sur les humains, ou la zazirocratie, Pékin, chez DSMGTLFPQXZ, 1761. Translated by Brian Stableford in 2011 in Amilec ISBN 978-1-61227-033-3
- Histoire des Galligènes; ou Mémoires de Duncan, 1765.
- Reprinted with a new title : Histoire naturelle, civile et politique des Galligènes antipodes de la nation françoise, dont ils tirent leur origine. Où l'on développe la naissance, les progrès, les moeurs et les vertus singulières de ces insulaires. Les révolutions et les productions merveilleuses de leur Isle, avec l'histoire de leur Fondateur, 1770.
- Sanfrein ou mon dernier séjour à la campagne, 1765.
- Reprinted with a new title : La girouette, ou Sans Frein, histoire dont le héros fut l'inconséquence même, 1770.

== Online texts ==
- Gallica, online documents from the French BnF, proposing for free the quasi-full set of French publications of Tiphaigne de la Roche in PDF format.
  - L'Amour dévoilé, ou le système des simpathistes, 1749.
  - Amilec, ou la graine d'hommes qui sert à peupler les planètes, 3rd Ed., 1754.
  - Bigarrures Philosophiques, 1759.(Part 1-Part 2)
  - Giphantie, 1760. (Part 1-Part 2)
  - L'Empire des Zaziris sur les humains ou la Zazirocratie, 1761.
  - Histoire naturelle, civile et politique des Galligènes ou Mémoires de Duncan, 1765. (Part 1-Part 2)
  - Sanfrein ou mon dernier séjour à la campagne, 1765.
