= Jerry Was a Man =

1947 short story by Robert A. Heinlein

"Jerry Was a Man" (1947) is a short story by American writer Robert A. Heinlein. It is about an attempt by a genetically modified chimpanzee to achieve human rights. The main theme of the story is civil liberties, in this case extended towards a group of genetically enhanced chimpanzees to allow them equal rights under the law.

The story was originally published in Thrilling Wonder Stories, October 1947, and is collected in the book Assignment in Eternity.

== Modern interpretation ==
The protagonist, Jerry, is a genetically modified chimpanzee, trained to do agricultural labor. The fight for his legal rights has parallels in today's legal system and the laws of some countries. However, some of Jerry's characteristics invite comparisons with American Black people, at which the modern reader may cringe. However, it is doubtful that Heinlein intended to be racist, because he used stereotypes that were extant when the story was written, and he had used Black characters in previous writings without stereotyping them.

== TV version ==
"Jerry Was a Man" was adapted for television and aired as part of the anthology series Masters of Science Fiction, on U.S. network ABC during the summer of 2007. The episode was filmed in Vancouver, Canada at Simon Fraser University.

The TV version has manufactured "anthropoid workers", produced through a combination of biological growth and engineering, ready made with some innate abilities and training to perform their allotted tasks. When the so-called "Joes" wore out or their jobs were completed, they were recycled into products such as dog food.

Heinlein's original work depicted Jerry as an aging agricultural worker, whereas the television version depicted Jerry as an explosive ordnance disposal technician or "minesweeper". In it, Jerry demonstrates his humanity to the court by singing the song "Old Folks at Home (Swanee River)", an old slave ballad, in front of the jury. In the TV version, Jerry's level of self-awareness is minimal, but his lawyer demonstrates his humanity through three traits: first, his fondness for singing "Jingle Bells"; second, his ability to tell a lie in order to obtain a cigarette; third (and most significant) his sense of self-preservation, which is demonstrated through video footage of Jerry cutting away from where a mine is so a fellow minesweeper gets blown up instead.

== See also ==
- Les Animaux dénaturés by Jean Bruller
- Great ape personhood
- Monkey selfie
