= Elsewhen =

1941 SF novella by Robert A. Heinlein

Elsewhen (1941) is a science fiction novella by American writer Robert A. Heinlein, concerning time travel and parallel universes. It was first published as Elsewhere in the September 1941 issue of Astounding Science Fiction, under the pen name Caleb Saunders, and was reprinted in the 1953 book Assignment in Eternity, with some minor changes, and an additional character and that character's journey.

== Story ==
The story concerns five (originally four) diverse students who attend a philosophy seminar. The professor, Arthur Frost, explains that he learned how to use his mind to go back in time and correct a bad mistake in his life. Using hypnosis he lets them travel to alternate worlds of their choice. All the students disappear except one, Howard Jenkins. The hypnotic suggestions had no effect on him, because he could not at all believe that it was possible. He is distraught at the disappearances, but the professor assures him that they all received a hypnotic suggestion to come back in two hours.

After two hours the students start coming back, and they tell their stories. In each case, the subjective time elapsed was much longer than two hours. Some of them spent a whole lifetime in the alternate world.

The first one back is Martha Ross. She comes back as an angel. She lived as a missionary in the parallel world, died for her cause, and went to heaven. After telling her story, she disappears. (This section was not part of the original story.)

Next arrives Helen Fisher. She has traveled multiple, very improbable timelines. One of them was in prehistory, where she lived with an old Neanderthal. He was treating her fatherly, and she enjoyed the place, until she was assaulted by a young Neanderthal. Another timeline was in modern time New York City, but she entered the timeline backwards. For a short while there she moved backwards in time, until she fainted and got moved into a different timeline. Eventually she arrived in a place with an extra spatial dimension; there she realized she could see inside solid objects. She studied her own body, and performed appendectomy on herself with her nails.

After Helen finishes her story, Robert Monroe arrives. He has changed physically, having a shorter, stockier body; with this, and with his peaked hood, he calls to mind a gnome. He is seriously injured: his arm has been badly burned. He perceives his new timeline as his home. His name there is Igor and he has a sister. His world is at war with space invaders, and his sister is a military leader. The situation is dire and their side is losing. He refuses to go to hospital for his injury, so Fisher uses her knowledge of first aid to treat him. Fisher then chooses to return with him, and she helps him carry books and tools. They become a couple, though the story does not show any emotional buildup.

After a long wait it becomes apparent that Estelle Martin is not coming back. Frost attempts to find her by listening to the same hypnotic-suggestion recording that she had used and by thinking about her. Jenkins watches him disappear, so that he would start believing in this possibility, and be eventually able to travel between timelines. Frost arrives on a Flash Gordon–like planet, and finds Estelle to be a priestess with the name Star Light. She refuses to go back, because she considers her new reality to be real and the old one to be a dream. Frost goes back and returns with Jenkins. As they arrive, Jenkins has turned into a native of Estelle's timeline. He is a soldier with a blaster, and he knows Estelle as Star Light.

Frost returns to the original timeline and is arrested on suspicion of kidnapping and possibly murdering his students. He knows that the authorities would not believe the truth, so he disappears into Robert Monroe's timeline. He stays there for a while and discovers that his theoretical knowledge is not helpful with the war efforts. The books and tools that Fisher brought were helpful, but not enough, so he travels to Estelle's and Jenkins' timeline, returning with Jenkins and his blaster. Jenkins explains the blaster's functionality and leaves his as a model. Igor is certain that the blaster technology will enable them to win the war.

Frost escorts Jenkins back to Estelle's timeline, and he decides to settle there. He plans to spend his time tutoring children and trying to develop a time theory that would explain the experiences of all five students.

== Characters ==
- Dr. Arthur Frost: University professor; instructor for Speculative Metaphysics course.
- Students taking Speculative Metaphysics course:
  - Howard Jenkins: Engineering student. He is taking the class solely because of his feelings for Estelle.
  - Helen Fisher: Adventurous; interested in gender equality.
  - Robert Monroe/Igor:
  - Estelle Martin/Star Light:
  - Martha Ross: Very religious student. (Missing in the original version.)
- People in the main timeline:
  - Izowski: Police sergeant guarding Dr. Frost
  - Chief of police
- Prehistory (Helen Fisher's travel):
  - Old Man: A Neanderthal man who found Helen and took care of her
- The war world (Robert Monroe's travel):
  - Igor's sister Margri, a group commander in the war against aliens
