= The Unpleasant Profession of Jonathan Hoag =

1942 science fantasy novella by Robert A. Heinlein

- 1966 edition
- Author: Robert A. Heinlein
- Language: English
- Genre: Science fantasy
- Publication date: October 1942
- Publication place: United States
- Media type: Print (Periodical & Paperback)
- First published in Unknown Worlds, October 1942

The Unpleasant Profession of Jonathan Hoag is a science fantasy novella by American writer Robert A. Heinlein. It was originally published in the October 1942 issue of Unknown Worlds magazine under the pseudonym of "John Riverside". The novella also lends its title to a collection of Heinlein's short stories published in 1959.

== Plot summary ==
Jonathan Hoag, a lover of art and fine dining living in Chicago, realizes that he has no memory of his daytime activities when asked, at an evening dinner, what he does for a living. Furthermore, when he washes his hands in the evening, he discovers a red-brown substance, possibly dried blood, under his fingernails.

He contacts a detective agency, Randall & Craig, and asks them to follow him during the day. The partners, actually the husband-and-wife team of Ted and Cynthia Randall, agree to this. They try to collect fingerprints from their client, but find that Hoag leaves none, even when not wearing gloves. The few memories that Hoag can remember turn out to be false, except for his home address, and his memory of the doctor, Potiphar T. Potbury, whom Hoag consults about the substance under his fingernails, upon which Potbury has Hoag thrown out of his office and warns him not to return.

The first time the pair tail Hoag, Cynthia sees him turn and talk to her husband. Then Cynthia is menaced by Hoag after she tails him in an office building. When she is reunited with Ted, he tells her that he had a completely different experience: after uneventfully tailing Hoag into the building and up to Hoag's office on the thirteenth floor, Ted discovers that Hoag is a jeweler working for a company called Detheridge & Co., and that the red substance is jeweler's rouge. Both realize that something is terribly wrong, especially once they discover that the building has no thirteenth floor.

Ted has a series of "dreams" in which he is taken through a mirror into the offices of Detheridge & Co., where he is told to leave Hoag alone by an assemblage of conservative businessmen. He ignores the dreams until, in one final dream, Cynthia is taken through as well. The businessmen reveal themselves as "Sons of the Bird", disciples of an old pagan religion; Hoag is a nemesis of theirs. They cause something to be sucked out of Cynthia into a bottle and return her and Ted to their apartment.

Ted wakes up to find Cynthia in an apparent coma. He realizes that the dreams were true, and paints over all the mirrors in the apartment. He then calls Potbury, the only doctor he knows, to come and examine Cynthia. Potbury diagnoses her with lethargica gravis, but when Ted repeats the mantra of the Sons of the Bird to him, "The Bird is Cruel!", Potbury compulsively covers his face just as the Sons did. Realizing Potbury is one of them, Ted overpowers him and locks him in the bathroom. He calls Hoag, who comes to the apartment. Told about Potbury, Hoag says that lethargica gravis is just a way of saying "deep sleep". They open the bathroom door, only to find that Potbury is gone, and the mirror scraped free of paint with a razor. They find a bottle in Potbury's black bag which, upon being opened, causes Cynthia to awaken.

To solve the mystery once and for all, Ted and Cynthia take Hoag to their office and subject him to questioning under drugs. After a few questions, Hoag wakes up with a strong, dominant personality, completely different from the nervous, weak man they have heretofore worked with. He declares the session over and tells them to meet him later in a park just outside the city. He gives them a list of things to bring and leaves them in a state of some puzzlement.

Reaching the park, with the collection of fine foods and wines Hoag requested, Ted and Cynthia find him there. They picnic on the epicurean fare, and Hoag tells them he is an art critic. The art in question is their entire world, created by an "artist" as a student project. Critics live as inhabitants in the world, not knowing they are critics, in order to judge experiences. One such experience is eating and drinking, as Hoag points out, since the simple act of gaining energy to live had not been thought of as an "experience" previously. Another is sex, but this is thought to be ridiculous until Hoag realizes that it is the basis for "the tragedy of human love" that he sees between Ted and Cynthia. Hoag's artistic judgment is that, while there is much that is amateurish in the world, overall, its creator has real promise.

The Sons of the Bird are responsible for all the things that Ted and Cynthia have seen, including the times they saw Hoag during the day. They only encountered the real Hoag in their home and office. The Sons were an early artistic mistake, hurriedly "painted over" rather than eliminated in the rush to complete the work, but still holding power. Now they are to be expunged completely. Hoag was recruited to report on them; the substance under his fingernails is their ichor, placed there to make them fearful.

Hoag tells the couple to leave the city, not stopping to talk to anyone on the way. He places one last grape in his mouth and then becomes still. Leaving his inert body, the two drive through town, but finally yield to the urge to tell someone about Hoag's body. When they roll down their car windows, however, all that is outside their automobile is a pulsing, luminous mist, though all the other windows show an apparently normal scene. They drive on in a state of shock.

In the epilogue, the Randalls now live in an unnamed remote rural area by the sea. They do everything together, have no mirrors in their home, and every night before going to sleep "he handcuffs one of his wrists to one of hers".

== Reception ==
Alexei and Cory Panshin described the novella as "the last and strangest of the stories that Robert Heinlein contributed to the Golden Age before he ceased to write during World War II." Galaxy's Floyd C. Gale in 1961 found it "a brand of fantasy-mystery [that] would shock present-day Heinlein lovers", while the SF Site's Dale Darlage stated in 2011 that it seemed more like the work of Philip K. Dick than of Heinlein, and that although not all the aspects of the story have aged well, "the underlying story overcomes all of that window dressing."

In 1996, Jonathan Lethem published the short story "The Insipid Profession of Jonathan Hornebom (Hommage à Heinlein)", which the SF Site's Neil Walsh called "an overt parody" of Heinlein's original, while conceding that it is "parody-tribute-homage (...) rather than outright mockery".

The cultural theorist Slavoj Žižek has asserted that the luminous mist which confronts Ted and Cynthia as they drive out of town could only represent the Lacanian Real, "the pulsing of the presymbolic substance in its abhorrent vitality."
