= Blowups Happen =

1940 science fiction short story by American writer Robert A. Heinlein

- Author: Robert A. Heinlein
- Language: English
- Genre: Science fiction
- Publication date: 1940
- Publication place: United States

"Blowups Happen" is a 1940 science fiction short story by American writer Robert A. Heinlein. It is one of two stories in which Heinlein, using only public knowledge of nuclear fission, anticipated the actual development of nuclear technology a few years later. The other is Solution Unsatisfactory, which revolves around radiological warfare.

The story was first published in Astounding Science Fiction in 1940, before any nuclear reactors had ever been built, and for its appearance in the 1946 anthology The Best of Science Fiction, Heinlein made some modifications to reflect how a reactor actually worked. In the omnibus The Past Through Tomorrow, "Blowups Happen" is referred to as a 1940 story, but it mentions the 1945 atomic bombing of Hiroshima and Nagasaki, reflecting revisions made in 1946.

The story made a later appearance in The Worlds of Robert A. Heinlein, a collection of short stories published in 1966. It also appears in his Expanded Universe in 1980, but here it appears in its original Astounding 1940 version: Heinlein writes in an introduction to the story: "I now see, as a result of the enormous increase in the art in 33 years, more errors in the '46 version than I spotted in the '40 version when I checked it in '46".

The story is one of the earliest in Heinlein's Future History chronology, taking place in the late 20th century.

== Plot ==
The story describes the tensions among the staff of a nuclear reactor, described as a uranium-powered pile. Heinlein's concept of a nuclear reactor was one of a barely contained explosion, not the steady-state thermal plants developed later. As a consequence, the work is dangerous, and the slightest mistake could be catastrophic. By the time the story starts, all the technical staff are monitored by psychologists who have the authority to remove them from the work at any time lest they crack under the pressure and precipitate a disaster. The monitoring itself contributes to the problem of stress.

The supervisor calls up Dr. Lentz, a fictional student of Alfred Korzybski, to analyze the situation. Lentz determines that there is little to be done, and the reactor will have to be shut down. Another consultant, Captain Harrington of the United States Naval Observatory, arrives as Lentz is preparing to return home. Harrington has discovered that the calculations on the reactor have greatly underestimated the scale of the destruction, should the reactor go out of control, and proposes that the cratering of the moon is due to an extinct civilization that destroyed itself in such a manner. The situation seems hopeless, as the energy produced by the reactor is sorely needed on Earth, oil having become too scarce and valuable to use for fuel.

In a parallel subplot, some researchers have discovered a way to blend two isotopes that both solves safety problems and allows for nuclear-powered rockets. Using a method called "calculus of statement", the team uses this discovery, taking into account the social, psychological, physical, and economic variables pressuring the reactor to remain online, and concludes that the reactor should be launched into space to produce the new fuel, which would then be returned to Earth and burned safely in different reactors. The main reactor being in space removes the danger of planetary catastrophe but, by breeding the new fuel, still allows it to produce the needed energy.

The protagonists have difficulty convincing the board of directors for the reactor of this plan. However, Lentz, speaking for the local manager, finally gets the point across. Lentz explains the danger of the current situation factually, but at their continued refusal, threatens to denounce them in public, which could start a panic, while also offering to ennoble them should they shut it down. Finally they relent, and a rocket is quickly built. A man goes crazy just as they finish, but is stopped. The reactor is shut down in preparation for being moved.

In Heinlein's Future History, the next story sequentially is "The Man Who Sold the Moon", in which the reactor indeed explodes in space. The actual cause was the detonation of the service rocket's fuel, caused by the effects of cosmic radiation on the supposedly stable nuclear material.

== Reception ==
In 2016, the story was nominated for the 1941 Retro-Hugo Award for Best Novelette.
