= Life-Line =

1939 short story by American author Robert A. Heinlein

- Short story by Robert A. Heinlein
- Country: United States
- Language: English
- Genre: Science fiction

Publication
- Published in: Astounding Science-Fiction
- Publication type: Magazine
- Publisher: Street & Smith
- Publication date: August 1939

"Life-Line" is a short story by American author Robert A. Heinlein. Published in the August 1939 edition of Astounding, it was Heinlein's first published short story.

The protagonist, Professor Hugo Pinero, builds a machine that will predict how long a person will live. It does this by sending a signal along the world line of a person and detecting the echo from the far end. Professor Pinero's invention has a powerful impact on the life insurance industry, as well as on his own life.

Pinero is mentioned in passing in the novels Time Enough for Love and Methuselah's Children when the practically immortal Lazarus Long mentions having been examined and being sent away because the machine is "broken".

A short film adaptation produced by Eric R. Gignac and directed by Dodd Kreutz was released in 2022.

== Writing history ==
Heinlein was motivated to write the story by an editorial in Thrilling Wonder Stories magazine, in which Hugo Gernsback wrote that he wanted to foster new talent in the field, and that "We shall endeavor to present one amateur writer's story in each forthcoming issue [...] until further notice." Thrilling Wonder Stories' rate at the time was 0.5¢ per word. After Heinlein had written the 7,000-word story, he submitted it first to a rival magazine, Astounding, which paid 1¢ per word. Astounding bought the story, and at their higher rate, Heinlein was paid $70 (equivalent to $1,600 in 2025).

According to Virginia Heinlein's introductory biography of her husband in Grumbles from the Grave, upon receiving the check for the story Heinlein reportedly said, "How long has this racket been going on?" Later, Heinlein's authorized biography included a version of the story in which Thrilling Wonder Stories had advertised a $50 contest. The first known version of this story appeared in a 1985 interview published in Xignals, a science fiction newsletter.

"Life-Line" was later collected in The Worlds of Robert A. Heinlein (1966), Expanded Universe (1980), and in a Baen edition of The Man Who Sold The Moon (1987).
