= Lost Legacy =

1941 novella by Robert A. Heinlein

Lost Legacy (1941) is a novella by science fiction writer Robert A. Heinlein.

The story was rejected by John W. Campbell for Astounding. It was then accepted by Frederick Pohl, and was published in the November 1941 issue of Super Science Stories under the title "Lost Legion" and the pseudonym Lyle Monroe. The story was collected as "Lost Legacy" under Heinlein's own name in the book Assignment in Eternity (1953).

Campbell, when rejecting the story, said that it was good, not great. However, Pohl said that "Some of Heinlein's early work came to me because John didn't have the wit to buy it". He also said that this piece was published under a pseudonym because he was only paying Heinlein "something like a quarter of a cent a word".

The novella is an exploration of the possibilities that humans, with the proper training, have the potential to make use of a wide range of telepathic and telekinetic abilities. It is based on the presumption that most, if not all, humans have innate psychic abilities, but simply do not know it and therefore do not make use of them. This ignorance is encouraged by a mysterious and powerful cabal which benefits from keeping people unaware of their abilities.

== Plot summary ==
No date is given for the events, but they are in "a near future America" from the publishing date of 1941. Europe and Asia have suffered a "collapse" and the only significant technological advances mentioned are Picturephones and a "pocketphone".

The story begins with the rediscovery of innate human psychic powers by three friends, all from a California university: Joan a grad student; Ben, a surgeon and instructor at the medical school; and Phil a psychology professor. There are attempts by a corrupt elite to silence their discoveries, so they take a road trip to cool off and talk things over.

The road trip lands them near Mount Shasta around nightfall. In their tent, Joan declares that she wants to hike around the mountain the following day. Ben and Phil gallantly refuse to let her do so alone. After a good day hiking, Phil falls over a fern and breaks his fibula. He is rescued by Ambrose Bierce, the famous writer who disappeared and was declared dead in 1913 at age 71–72. This fictional Bierce is now over 100 years old but is as strong and robust as an outdoorsy fortysomething. This story's Bierce says he dropped out of society because he saw WWI and other troubles coming. Bierce causes Phil's fibula to heal overnight via hypnosis.

Bierce is revealed as one of a group of individuals who have developed their telepathic powers and all now live in secrecy on Mount Shasta in an elaborate cave structure. The caves are over 100 meters long with generous side rooms including a library filled with powerful ancient knowledge. The caves were discovered in modern times around 1782 by Junípero Serra two years before Serra "surrendered his soul to rest". The caves were then known to local First Nations people who showed them to Serra only after he swore an oath that he was a medicine man.

The current residents of the caves have learned to tap into an inner power that is a lot like The Force in Star Wars with less focus on fighting and more focus on art. Unlike Luke Skywalker whose talent with The Force seems to be a family trait, the abilities suggested in Lost Legacy are supposed to be in every human, needing only instruction and practice to master.

The people living in the cave claim that Mark Twain was one of them, as well as Walt Whitman and Oliver Wendell Holmes. As part of their program to protect America as a bastion of freedom they also invited Abraham Lincoln to join.

According to records found by the good adepts, humanity reached a high level of development in a Golden Age, but when their leaders decide to move on to a new plane of existence, a sub group decided to stay behind and use their skills to become dominant. After a great war humanity was thrown back to a Stone Age, there to start over.

After rescue by Bierce the three main characters are introduced to the residents of the cave and after a few weeks are invited to stay and receive further training. They accept. They then begin to spread information on how to use these psychic powers, particularly training Boy Scouts. After the evil cabal tries to stop them, battles occur between the two groups with the good adepts emerging victorious.

The story ends with a lyrical description of an empty Earth, since the human race has now evolved to a new plane of existence. An ape is beginning the long climb of his species to intelligence and psychic ability.
