= Magic, Inc. =

1940 science fantasy novella by Robert Heinlein

Waldo & Magic, Inc.
- Original 1940 publication magazine cover.
- Author: Robert A. Heinlein
- Language: English
- Genre: Science fantasy
- Publisher: Doubleday
- Publication date: 1940
- Publication place: United States
- Media type: Print (Hardcover & Paperback)

1994 Del Rey paperback cover.

Magic, Inc. is a science fantasy novella by American writer Robert A. Heinlein. It was originally published in Unknown Fantasy Fiction of September 1940, under the title "The Devil Makes the Law".

In the story, magic is a commonplace profession used by businessmen in various fields. A small business owner fights off an attempt to force magic under the control of a corrupt association called "Magic, Inc." The story is included in the book Waldo & Magic, Inc.

== Plot ==
Archie Fraser is a building contractor whose business is thriving. Despite the common use of magic in other professions, Archie has relatively little use for it, since so much of his work involves "cold iron", which defies magic. He does have a sideline in instant temporary structures, such as bleachers and tents, all made of wood with no iron in them, which can be reconstituted from a fragment of an original structure. The work is done by magicians operating as independent contractors. Occasionally mistakes are made – at one point a fragment of a house is used by mistake. Archie creatively puts a sign outside the out-of-place structure saying "Display model! Now open!"

One day Archie is the subject of a shakedown by a sleazy character who seems to be operating a protection racket based on magic. After scaring the criminal off by exploiting his obvious superstitions (helped by the display of a conveniently concealed handgun), Archie goes to see his friend Jedson, who uses magic to operate a clothing business. Jedson's specialty is "one season" clothing which is not intended to be hard-wearing. As Archie arrives, he is auditioning a teenage medium who can produce clothing from ectoplasm. Jedson is disappointed to find that the result is simply a copy of an existing design owned by somebody else, so he cannot use it.

Jedson and Archie are able to grab the would-be gangster as he lurks near Archie's storefront and hustle him inside. There Jedson draws a "magic circle" around the miscreant, imprisoning him. He then makes a voodoo doll and uses it to strike fear into the criminal. The criminal breaks down and babbles some information, most of it useless in finding out who runs the racket. They kick him out of the store, believing him to be just a small-time hood. Archie protests Jedson's tactics, but Jedson replies that he didn't really do anything. The circle and the doll were just symbolic. The man's own misguided beliefs caused his body to react as if he really were being imprisoned and tortured. At that point there is a scream outside. They discover the man's body, ripped from shoulder to groin as if by the talons of a huge bird, the gouges being filled with a stinking ichor.

Slowly Archie's business begins to suffer. There are mysterious accidents and problems with his workers who are scared by hex symbols which appear around the business. One morning the entire business is destroyed, apparently by elementals of fire, earth and water.

Jedson initially helps Archie consult a prestigious magician, Biddle, who sets up a tent on site, then after some activity in the tent, announces he can do nothing and that they owe him $500 as a "survey fee". Jedson politely tells him to forget it, as no such fee was mentioned before, and magicians, like lawyers, work on a "contingency fee" basis. Biddle disappears in a huff. At that point a young magician by the name of Bodie, who had been watching the performance, tells then they should have used an old witch he knows, a Mrs. Jennings.

They consult her in her small, well-ordered home. After a reading of tea-leaves, Mrs. Jennings announces that she knows what they need. At Archie's jobsite, she draws a pentacle and calls the elementals to her. These are a gnome, an undine, and a fire salamander. The undine is a repulsive sluglike creature, while the salamander is a naive, benign creature of flame which sees no wrong in burning, though it regrets causing harm. By force and persuasion, she instructs them to reverse what they did. There is a huge rushing noise and Archie's business is restored.

Strange events continue, this time directed at Archie himself. A few times he is saved from danger, apparently by the distant intervention of Mrs. Jennings herself. Jedson consults an anthropologist, who is also a "witch smeller". A large, handsome African impeccably dressed in an expensive business suit, holding a string of degrees from prestigious institutions, Dr. Royce Worthington can find and neutralize black magic. He eventually announces that he has found a lot of unusual magic, but that he will leave his grandfather (a shrunken head) behind to watch over things.

Meanwhile, Biddle's organization, a body of "professional magicians", nominally intended to assure high standards, keeps dunning Archie over Biddle's fee. There is also a new "one stop shopping" company calling itself "Magic, Inc." which hires magicians and finds them work. It is an open secret that the two organizations are the same. The nominal head of Magic Inc. is a man called Ditworth. Jedson discovers that a bill in the State Legislature, intended to regulate magicians, would give Ditworth monopoly power. They go to the State Capitol to try to head off this law, but are outwitted by Ditworth, who manages to get the bill attached to a major public works project, making its passage unstoppable. However Ditworth makes the mistake of passing by a large mirror in the Capitol building. He is seen to cast no reflection, showing that he is actually a demon.

Once the law begins to bite, only magicians who work for Magic Inc. are able to find work, while those who refuse to join Magic Inc. have their licenses revoked. Meanwhile, customers such as Archie are charged ever higher rates for magic services. Jedson discovers that Ditworth has been at work in all other states, and there is nowhere for them to go to get away from his schemes.

Royce, Jedson, Bodie and Archie meet at Mrs Jennings house from time to time. They hatch a plan to enter the Half World, the realm of demons and Old Nick himself, to challenge Ditworth. Bodie stays behind to guard the portal in Mrs. Jennings' fireplace, while Jedson (transformed into an ugly half-bestial form), Royce (in his work costume), and Archie (in his normal form) travel with Mrs. Jennings, who to Archie's surprise and delight, has transformed herself into Amanda Jennings, the young, beautiful redhead she once was.

In the Half World, custom reigns supreme and natural laws are negotiable. They go before Old Nick and demand to inspect his demons, as custom allows. Faced with seemingly endless legions of horrific creatures, Royce and Archie, helped by Mrs. Jennings' cat, travel up and down the rows. Jedson and Amanda have to remain behind as hostages. After what seems years they identify and tackle Ditworth. Being a demon, Ditworth can kill them, but another demon breaks ranks and subdues their enemy. At this point their helper reveals himself to be an FBI agent. Archie faints.

Again citing custom, they demand that Ditworth face their champion, who is of course the white witch Amanda. Ditworth is afraid to do this, and has to face Old Nick's sentence for being defeated by white magic. He is imprisoned for "a thousand thousand years", a fairly light sentence, which is enough to stop his scheming on Earth.

Old Nick announces that the FBI man has to stay behind for his special attention, but after a challenge from Amanda, who seems capable of taking on him and all his legions, he thinks better of it. They all return to the house. The FBI man tells them he was working Ditworth's scams from another angle and had become trapped in the Half World. As they emerge from the fireplace, Bodie recognizes him as an old friend. The FBI man, now in human form with a snappy suit and fedora hat, bids them a quick goodbye as he leaves to report back to the Bureau.

Archie, overpowered by Amanda's beauty, hangs around her like a lovesick puppy, but she is firmly unreceptive. She sets him down for a nap to recover from his ordeal, and when he awakes, she is Mrs. Jennings again. Archie's business recovers, as all Ditworth's schemes fall apart.

== Reception ==
Kirkus Reviews considered it to be "highly imaginative", while Rain Taxi called it a "breakthrough".

== See also ==
- Operation Chaos/Operation Luna - a similar fantasy world by Poul Anderson
- The Case of the Toxic Spell Dump - a similar fantasy world by Harry Turtledove
