= To Sail Beyond the Sunset =

1987 SF novel by Robert A. Heinlein

- Author: Robert A. Heinlein
- Cover artist: Boris Vallejo
- Language: English
- Genre: Science fiction
- Publisher: G. P. Putnam's Sons
- Publication date: 1987
- Publication place: United States
- Media type: Print (Hardcover & Paperback)
- Pages: 416 (first edition, hardback)
- ISBN: 0-399-13267-8 (first edition, hardback)
- OCLC: 14588878
- Dewey Decimal: 813/.54 19
- LC Class: PS3515.E288 T6 1987

To Sail Beyond the Sunset is a science fiction novel by American writer Robert A. Heinlein, published in 1987. It was the last novel published before his death in 1988. The title is taken from the poem "Ulysses", by Alfred Tennyson. The stanza of which it is a part, quoted by a character in the novel, is as follows:

... my purpose holds
To sail beyond the sunset, and the baths
Of all the western stars, until I die.

It is the final part of the "Lazarus Long" cycle of stories, involving time travel, parallel dimensions, free love, voluntary incest, and a concept that Heinlein named pantheistic solipsism, or 'World as Myth': the theory that universes are created by the act of imagining them, so that somewhere (for example) the Land of Oz is real. Other books in the cycle include Methuselah's Children, Time Enough for Love, The Number of the Beast, and The Cat Who Walks Through Walls.

== Plot ==
The book is a memoir of Maureen Johnson Smith Long, mother, lover, and eventual wife of Lazarus Long. Maureen is ostensibly recording the events of the book while held in prison alongside Pixel, the cat from The Cat Who Walks Through Walls.

Maureen, born on July 4, 1882, recounts her girlhood in backcountry Missouri, discovery that her family is a member of the long-lived Howard Families (whose backstory is revealed in Methuselah's Children), marriage to Brian Smith, another member of that group, and her life—largely in Kansas City—until her apparent death in 1982. In addition, Maureen lives through, and gives her (sometimes contradictory) viewpoints on many events in other Heinlein stories, most notably the 1917 visit from the future by "Ted Bronson" (Lazarus Long), told from Long's point of view in Time Enough for Love, D. D. Harriman's space program from The Man Who Sold the Moon, and the rolling roads from The Roads Must Roll.

Maureen's adventures include a series of sexual encounters, beginning in childhood wherein, having just had her first sexual intercourse, she is examined by her father, a doctor, and finds herself desiring him sexually. Her story then encompasses various boys, her husband, ministers, other women's husbands, boyfriends, swinging sessions, and the adult Lazarus Long/Theodore Bronson. Additionally, she continues a lifelong pursuit of her father sexually, encourages her husband to have sexual intercourse with their daughters, and accompanies him when he does; but forbids a son and daughter of hers from continuing an incestuous relationship, primarily for the sister's reluctance to share the brother with other women. All of these are set against a history lesson of an alternate 20th century in which a variety of social and philosophical commentary is delivered.

She is eventually rescued from prison by Lazarus Long and other characters of various novels in the ship Gay Deceiver (from The Number of the Beast), and after rescuing her father from certain death in the Battle of Britain, is united with her descendants in a massive group marriage in the settlement of Boondock, on the planet Tertius. Maureen ends her memoir and the Lazarus Long saga with the phrase "And we all lived happily ever after".
