= They (Heinlein) =

1941 short story by Robert A. Heinlein

"They" is a science fiction short story by American writer Robert A. Heinlein. It was first published in the April 1941 issue of Unknown, and can be found in Heinlein's short story collection The Unpleasant Profession of Jonathan Hoag. It also appears in a number of multi-author anthologies.

== Plot summary ==
The story concerns an unnamed man who is confined to a mental institution because he is suffering from the delusion that he is one of the few "real" entities in the universe, and that the other "real" entities have created the rest of the universe in a conspiracy to deceive him. He spends much of the story engaged in verbal sparring with the psychiatrist who is caring for him, and in pondering his predicament, trying to figure out a way to prove that his belief is true. On the final page of the story, the reader discovers that his belief is true; the god-like character "the Glaroon" is behind the conspiracy. However, this revelation is kept from the protagonist.

== Reception ==
The story has been noted as "both a paranoid and a solipsistic fantasy", containing "the most complex discussion of those philosophical matters that have troubled [Heinlein] throughout these early years [of his career as a writer]."

Gary K. Wolfe describes it as a "classically paranoid vision of the world", and states that the story only qualifies as fantasy because Heinlein does not offer any explanation of "who or what the Glaroon is and what its motives are".

== See also ==
- The Truman Show, a 1998 comedy-drama film that chronicles the life of a man who discovers he is living in a constructed reality soap opera, televised 24/7.
- Matrix, a virtual reality access to knowledge in Doctor Who episodes.
- Now and On Earth, a Jim Thompson novel in which the narrator discusses the story at length, and frequently refers back to it as a metaphor for his own life.
- Simulated reality
