= Waldo (short story) =

1942 short story by Robert Heinlein

Waldo & Magic, Inc.
- 1942 original publication magazine cover
- Author: Robert A. Heinlein
- Language: English
- Genre: Science fiction
- Publisher: Doubleday
- Publication date: 1950
- Publication place: United States
- Media type: Print (hardback & paperback)

"Waldo" (1942) is a short story by American writer Robert A. Heinlein, originally published in Astounding Magazine in August 1942 under the pseudonym Anson MacDonald. It is available in the 1950 book Waldo & Magic, Inc. (as well as other collections). Both stories in that collection involve magic but are otherwise unrelated.

The essence of the story is the journey of a mechanical genius from his self-imposed exile from the rest of humanity to a more normal life, conquering the disease myasthenia gravis as well as his own contempt for humans in general. The key to this is that magic is loose in the world, but in a logical and scientific way.

Waldo Farthingwaite-Jones was born a weakling, unable even to lift his head up to drink or to hold a spoon. Far from destroying him, this channeled his intellect, and his family's money, into the development of the device patented as "Waldo F. Jones' Synchronous Reduplicating Pantograph". Wearing a glove and harness, Waldo could control a much more powerful mechanical hand simply by moving his hand and fingers. This and other technologies he develops make him a rich man, rich enough to build a home in space.

In the story, these devices became popularly known as "waldos". In reference to this story, the real-life remote manipulators that were later developed also came to be called waldos, some even by NASA. Later, an American company, The Character Shop, which creates animatronic devices and objects (often for motion pictures), obtained the trademark to Waldo for "data-capture input devices".

Waldo's personality can best be described as arrogance combined with misanthropy. He does not think of himself as crippled. In his mind he is superior to all other humans because of his weakness. He reasons that if a chimpanzee is ten times as strong as a man, and a man is ten times as strong as a waldo, then waldos are as far above men as men are above chimpanzees. He calls the rest of humanity "overmuscled canaille, smooth chimps". His home's location, which he calls Freehold, is located in orbit high above Earth and is symbolic of his relation to the rest of humanity.

== Plot summary ==
As the story opens, a dancer is performing feats of astonishing virtuosity on stage. Afterward, in the dressing room, while preparing to depart for his other job as a neurosurgeon, the dancer reminisces to a reporter about what made him take up dancing. The rest of the story is told as a flashback.

James Stevens, Chief Engineer of North American Power-Air (NAPA), is desperate to discover what is causing vehicles driven by broadcast power to cease functioning. Society has harnessed cheap atomic power, broadcast by NAPA, to run homes, factories, ground vehicles, and even personal aircraft which can travel into space. If the failures continue, not only will he lose his job but the entire power system of the country could collapse.

The heart of the technology is the "deKalb receptor". The deKalbs are failing, and no one can identify the cause. In desperation, Stevens approaches Doc Grimes, a physician who has known Waldo since birth, to try to persuade Waldo to help. Waldo has a grudge against NAPA after losing a legal battle with them some years before.

Waldo lives on a space station in high orbit, where microgravity allows him to move around despite his weakness. He makes his living as a consulting engineer, with a specialty in fine motor skills.

Once Grimes reveals Stevens' purpose, Waldo turns hostile. Nothing would persuade him to help NAPA. Stevens leaves, but Grimes has a few words with Waldo, pointing out where his food comes from and so forth. Waldo reluctantly takes the case, but Grimes insists on one more condition: Waldo must figure out what effect broadcast power has on humans. Grimes is seeing a slow weakening of the human physique, and he blames the radiant power industry.

Stevens returns to Earth to find that McLeod, one of his engineers who had experienced a power failure in his personal craft, has returned. He tells Stevens that he fixed the deKalbs. McLeod broke down in Pennsylvania Dutch country, where he grew up. Visiting an old hex doctor known as Gramps Schneider, McLeod let him look at the deKalbs. Schneider announced that "now the fingers will make", meaning the antennas on the deKalbs will work. McLeod finds to his surprise that the deKalbs are indeed functional. However he has a surprise for Stevens. In operation, the antennas now flex and wiggle like fingers reaching for something.

Waldo, meanwhile, having satisfied himself that the deKalbs really are having basic problems, also realizes that Grimes is right. Then he gets a call from NAPA's head of research, Dr. Rambeau, who seems to have come unhinged. Having seen the wiggling deKalbs, he announces that he knows what is happening. "Magic is loose in the world!" he tells Waldo. He shows Waldo some seemingly impossible tricks he can do now that he understands magic. Waldo calls Stevens to have Rambeau brought to him, but Stevens reports that Rambeau somehow escaped from his restraints without actually unfastening them. Not only that, he has made another set of deKalbs behave as strangely as McLeod's. Waldo asks to have Rambeau's notes and equipment shipped up to him.

Seeing the eccentric deKalbs, Waldo realizes that he must learn what happened to them. Schneider will not leave his home, so Waldo has to go back to Earth, an experience he dreads. Shipped down in a medical craft, with Grimes in attendance, he lies in his waterbed while Schneider examines him. Schneider thinks he should get up and walk, but Waldo protests he cannot. Schneider tells him he must "reach out for the power". According to Schneider, the "Other World is close by and full of power", waiting only for someone to grab it. In Schneider's hands, Waldo does indeed experience a sense of well-being, and is able to lift up a coffee cup one-handed for the first time in his life.

Schneider explains an old philosophy, how something which can be true for this world might not be for the Other World. Since our minds sit in the Other World, this is important. McLeod, according to Schneider, was "tired and fretful", and found one of the "bad truths", causing the deKalbs to fail. Schneider simply looked for the other truth, and the deKalbs worked again.

At first Waldo thinks the journey wasted. He tries Schneider's methods on a failed deKalb. To his astonishment, they begin to work in just the same fashion as McLeod's. Stevens calls him to say that things are getting much worse. Waldo, thrown off balance by the "impossible" thing he has just seen, decides to twit Stevens with Rambeau's words: "Magic is loose in the world!"

Waldo realizes that Stevens' and Grimes' problems are related. Radiant power is affecting the human nervous system. People feel weak, rundown, fretful, and somehow transfer their malaise to the deKalbs. He also realizes something that Stevens has not noticed. The repaired deKalbs work without broadcast power. Apparently they draw energy from Schneider's "Other World".

Waldo uses this to exact his revenge. Summoning NAPA's representatives to his home, he demonstrates that he can fix deKalbs and can train others to fix them. The repairs are 100% reliable, he asserts. Having received their formal acknowledgment that he has fulfilled his contract, he unveils the "Jones-Schneider deKalb", a Rube Goldberg contraption which appears to draw power from nowhere. He tells them that with this he can put NAPA out of business. Of course, NAPA offers a settlement from which Waldo profits hugely, even though the new deKalb is a repaired one with a lot of distracting technology attached.

Eventually Waldo realizes that he himself can draw strength from the Other World. Tricking Grimes and Stevens into taking him to Earth again, he walks out of the craft, almost causing Grimes to have a heart attack.

The dancer from the beginning of the story, who is Waldo, departs the dressing room with great bonhomie. His principal assistant is the former chairman of the board at North American Power-Air.

== Reception ==
L. Sprague de Camp praised "Waldo" for reflecting Heinlein's typical virtues: "his prodigality of invention, his shrewd grasp of human nature and his versatile knowledge of law, politics, business and science." However, he noted that although the story was "fast-moving," it "peter[ed] out at the end instead of rising to a climax."

== The waldo ==
A typical illustration of the tools in the story is Waldo's handling of his need to perform micro-dissection on the scale of cellular walls. He uses human-sized waldos to make smaller waldos, then uses those to make even smaller waldos, and continues the series until he has waldos small enough to work at the cellular scale.

There are three main factors involved in Heinlein's description of the tools:

- They work like human hands: not with a single active lever or twenty different tools, but with components arranged and with actions like human hands. The operator puts his or her hands in "gloves" and the waldos repeat the movements of the hands.
- They work in conjunction with viewing equipment that lets the user see the waldos as if they have the size and action of his own hands. This, in conjunction with the first factor, means that waldos are a "no-training" tool: if you know how to use your hands, you can use waldos.
- They allow work to be done remotely, in the next room or many miles away, or in an environment that could kill a human or be contaminated by human presence. They can be a different size from normal human hands: either huge for building construction or tiny for micro-manipulation.

== Cultural references ==
The time in which the story is set is not mentioned, but is clearly decades ahead of the 1940s when it was written. When Waldo visits Gramps Schneider, whom McLeod described as being older than anybody even when McLeod was a child, he notices a campaign button on the wall of Schneider's house. The slogan on the button is "Free Silver", a reference to the politics of the late 1800s in the United States. Waldo thinks, "Schneider must be—old!"

== See also ==
- Canadarm
- da Vinci Surgical System
- Remote manipulator
- Special Purpose Dexterous Manipulator
- Telepresence
- The Waldo Moment
