= Let There Be Light (Heinlein short story) =

1940 short story by Robert A. Heinlein

"Let There Be Light" is a science fiction short story by American writer Robert A. Heinlein, originally published in Super Science Stories magazine in May 1940 under the pseudonym Lyle Monroe. It is the second story in his Future History and was included in the first collection, The Man Who Sold the Moon, but was omitted from the omnibus collection The Past Through Tomorrow. This story draws on Heinlein's early leftist ideas, and makes references to George Bernard Shaw's The Apple Cart.

== Summary ==
The story concerns the invention of "light screens" – devices which turn electrical power directly into light (similar to electroluminescent displays, invented in 1949). In the course of their discovery, the inventors discover that these panels can also be used to derive power from light. In attempting to bring their discovery to market, they encounter the active opposition of the Power Syndicate, a conglomeration of energy-producing companies dedicated to preserving their monopoly on power production. Rather than trying to commercialise their invention, the scientists then publicly release the scientific details of their discovery, whilst keeping the patent, allowing anyone to obtain their own power for a small royalty, and thus outwitting the Power Syndicate. "Douglas-Martin sunpower screens" appear in several other Heinlein stories, such as "The Roads Must Roll".
