= Our Fair City =

1949 short story by Robert A. Heinlein

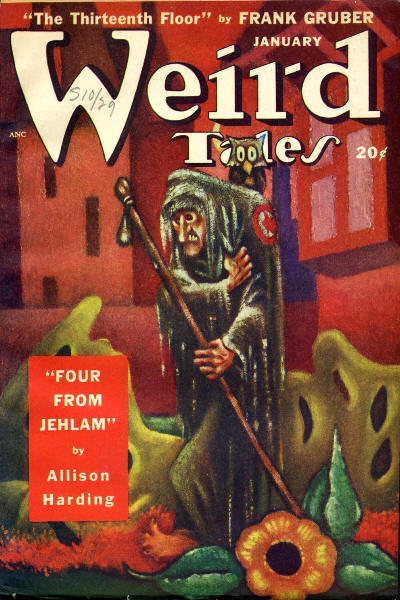
Cover of the pulp magazine Weird Tales

"Our Fair City" is a fantasy short story by Robert A. Heinlein, originally printed in Weird Tales, January 1949. The story involves an old parking lot attendant, his pet whirlwind (named Kitten), and a muckraking newspaper columnist who decide to "clean up" their city's corrupt government by running the whirlwind for political office.

== Reception ==
Alexei Panshin has called it an "amiable trifle", while Brian Stableford has described it as an example of "preliminary de-historicization followed by re-accommodation to American pragmatism".

== Origins ==
Heinlein biographer William H. Patterson Jr. noted that Heinlein wrote the story in four days in October 1947, inspired by L. Ron Hubbard's decision to name a dust devil which was frequently present outside Heinlein's apartment.
