= Robert A. Heinlein bibliography =

The science fiction writer Robert A. Heinlein (1907–1988) was productive during a writing career that spanned the last 49 years of his life. This includes 32 novels, 59 short stories and 16 collections published during his life. Four films, two TV series, several episodes of a radio series, at least two songs ("Hijack" by Jefferson Starship and "Cool Green Hills of Earth" by Southwind) and a board game derive more or less directly from his work. He wrote the screenplay for Destination Moon (1950). Heinlein also edited an anthology of other writers' science fiction short stories.

Four collections, three non-fiction books and two poems have been published posthumously, in addition to three novels, one of which was co-written with Spider Robinson.

Known pseudonyms include Anson MacDonald (seven times), Lyle Monroe (seven), John Riverside (one), Caleb Saunders (one), and Simon York (one). All the works originally attributed to MacDonald, Saunders, Riverside and York, and many of the works originally attributed to Lyle Monroe, were later reissued in various Heinlein collections and attributed to Heinlein.

== Novels ==
Novels marked with * are part of Scribner's "juvenile" series. Those marked with † are posthumous releases.

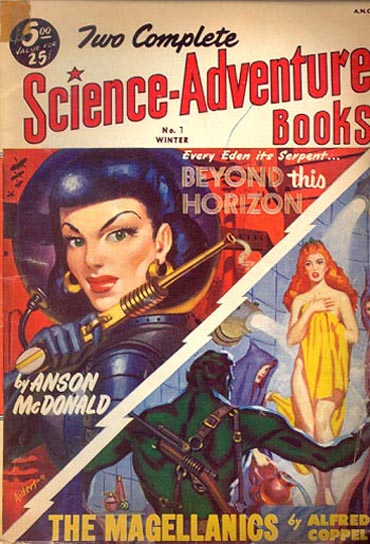
Heinlein's 1942 novel Beyond This Horizon was reprinted in Two Complete Science-Adventure Books in 1952

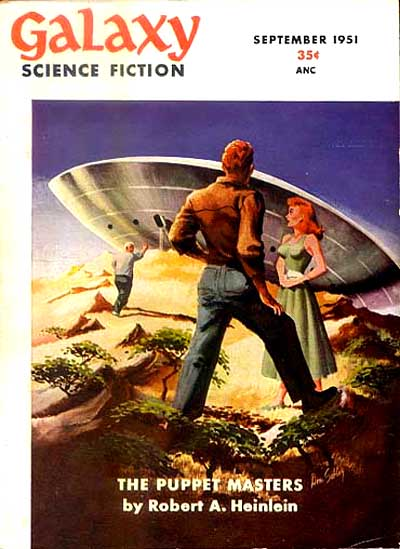
The opening installment of The Puppet Masters took the cover of the September 1951 issue of Galaxy Science Fiction

Year	Title	Notes	Awards and nominations
1947	Rocket Ship Galileo *		
1948	Beyond This Horizon	Initially serialized in 1942, and at that time credited to Anson MacDonald	2018 Hugo Award (Retro Hugos: Novel): Won
1948	Space Cadet *		
1949	Red Planet *		1996 Prometheus Award (Hall of Fame): Won
1949	Sixth Column	a.k.a. The Day After Tomorrow / Initially serialized in 1941, and at that time credited to Anson MacDonald.	
1950	Farmer in the Sky *	Initially serialized in a condensed version in Boys' Life magazine as Satellite Scout	2001 Hugo Award (Retro Hugos: Novel): Won
1951	Between Planets *		
1951	The Puppet Masters	Re-published posthumously with excisions restored, 1990	
1952	The Rolling Stones *	a.k.a. Space Family Stone	2006 Audie Awards (Science Fiction): Nominated
1953	Starman Jones *		
1954	The Star Beast *		2008 Audie Awards (Audio Drama): Nominated
1955	Tunnel in the Sky *		
1956	Double Star		1956 Hugo Award (Novel): Won 1987 Locus Award (All-Time Best SF Novel): Nominated
1956	Time for the Stars *		
1957	Citizen of the Galaxy *		2022 Prometheus Award (Hall of Fame): Won
1957	The Door into Summer		1975 Locus Award (All-Time Best Novel): Nominated 1987 Locus Award (All-Time Best SF Novel): Nominated
1958	Have Space Suit—Will Travel *		1959 Hugo Award (Novel): Nominated 1961 Sequoyah Book Award (Children): Won 2007 BSFA Award (Fiftieth Anniversary Award: Best Novel of 1958): Nominated
1958	Methuselah's Children	Originally a serialized novella in 1941	1997 Prometheus Award (Hall of Fame Award): Won
1959	Starship Troopers		1960 Hugo Award (Novel): Won 1975 Locus Award (All-Time Best Novel): Nominated 1987 Locus Award (All-Time Best SF Novel): Nominated
1961	Stranger in a Strange Land	Reprinted at the original greater length in 1991	1962 Hugo Award (Novel): Won 1975 Locus Award (All-Time Best Novel): Nominated 1987 Prometheus Award (Hall of Fame Award): Won 1987 Locus Award (All-Time Best SF Novel): Nominated 1990 Science Fiction Book Club's Book of the Year Award: Nominated
1963	Podkayne of Mars		2010 Audie Awards (Science Fiction): Nominated
1963	Orphans of the Sky	Fix-up novel comprising the novellas Universe and Common Sense, both originally published in 1941	
1963	Glory Road		1964 Hugo Award (Novel): Nominated 1987 Locus Award (All-Time Best Fantasy Novel): Nominated
1964	Farnham's Freehold		
1966	The Moon Is a Harsh Mistress		1967 Hugo Award (Novel): Won 1975 Locus Award (All-Time Best Novel): Nominated 1967 Nebula Award (Novel): Nominated 1983 Prometheus Award (Hall of Fame Award): Won 1987 Locus Award (All-Time Best SF Novel): Nominated
1970	I Will Fear No Evil		1971 Locus Award (Novel): Nominated 1978 Seiun Award (Translated Long Work): Won
1973	Time Enough for Love		1974 Locus Award (SF Novel): Nominated 1974 Hugo Award (Novel): Nominated 1974 Nebula Award (Novel): Nominated 1987 Locus Award (All-Time Best SF Novel): Nominated 1998 Prometheus Award (Hall of Fame Award): Won
1980	The Number of the Beast		1981 Locus Award (SF Novel): Nominated
1982	Friday		1983 Locus Award (SF Novel): Nominated 1983 Hugo Award (Novel): Nominated 1983 Nebula Award (Novel): Nominated 1983 Prometheus Award (Novel): Nominated
1984	Job: A Comedy of Justice		1985 Hugo Award (Novel): Nominated 1985 Locus Award (Fantasy Novel): Won 1985 Nebula Award (Novel): Nominated
1985	The Cat Who Walks Through Walls		1986 Locus Award (SF Novel): Nominated
1987	To Sail Beyond the Sunset		1988 Locus Award (SF Novel): Nominated 1989 Prometheus Award (Novel): Nominated
2003	For Us, the Living: A Comedy of Customs †	Written in 1938	2005 Locus Award (SF Novel): Nominated
2006	Variable Star †	(with Spider Robinson; Heinlein's eight page outline written in 1955; Robinson's full novel from the outline appeared in 2006)	
2020	The Pursuit of the Pankera †	An alternate version of The Number of the Beast	

== Short fiction ==
=== "Future History" short fiction ===
Year	Title	Notes	Awards and nominations
1939	Life-Line		
1939	Misfit		
1940	Let There Be Light	as Lyle Monroe	
1940	The Roads Must Roll		2016 Hugo Award (Retro Hugos: Novelette): Won
1940	Requiem		2003 Prometheus Award (Hall of Fame Award): Won 2016 Hugo Award (Retro Hugos: Short Story): Nominated
1940	"If This Goes On—"	First novel	2016 Hugo Award (Retro Hugos: Novella): Won
1940	Coventry		2016 Hugo Award (Retro Hugos: Novella): Nominated 2017 Prometheus Award (Hall of Fame Award): Won
1940	Blowups Happen		2016 Hugo Award (Retro Hugos: Novelette): Nominated
1941	Universe		
1941	—We Also Walk Dogs	as Anson MacDonald	
1941	Common Sense		
1941	Methuselah's Children	Lengthened and published as a novel in 1958	
1941	Logic of Empire		
1947	Space Jockey		
1947	It's Great to Be Back!		
1947	The Green Hills of Earth		1952 Analog Award (All-Time Best Book): 8th Place
1948	Ordeal in Space		
1948	The Long Watch		
1948	Gentlemen, Be Seated!		
1948	The Black Pits of Luna		
1949	Delilah and the Space Rigger		
1950	The Man Who Sold the Moon		1952 Analog Award (All-Time Best Book): 4th Place 2001 Hugo Award (Retro Hugos: Novella): Won
1957	The Menace from Earth		
1962	Searchlight		

=== Other short speculative fiction ===
All the works initially attributed to Anson MacDonald, Caleb Saunders, John Riverside and Simon York, and many of the works attributed to Lyle Monroe, were later reissued in various Heinlein collections and attributed to Heinlein.

At Heinlein's insistence, the three Lyle Monroe stories marked with the symbol '§' were never reissued in a Heinlein anthology during his lifetime.

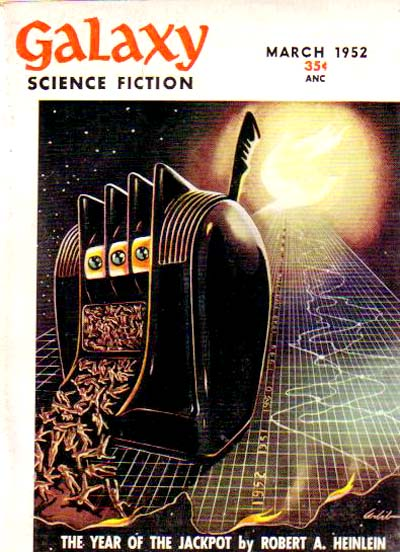
Heinlein's novelette "The Year of the Jackpot" was the cover story in the March 1952 issue of Galaxy Science Fiction

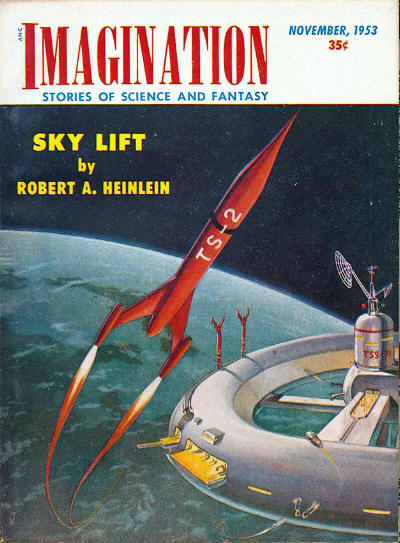
Heinlein's short story "Sky Lift" took the cover of the November 1953 issue of Imagination

Year	Title	Notes	Awards and nominations
1940	Magic, Inc.	a.k.a. The Devil Makes the Law	2016 Hugo Award (Retro Hugos: Novella): Nominated
1940	Solution Unsatisfactory	as Anson MacDonald	
1940	Successful Operation	(a.k.a. Heil!) (as Lyle Monroe)	
1941	They		
1941	And He Built a Crooked House		
1941	By His Bootstraps	as Anson MacDonald	
1941	Lost Legacy	(a.k.a. Lost Legion) (as Lyle Monroe)	
1941	Elsewhen	(a.k.a. Elsewhere) (as Caleb Saunders)	
1941	Beyond Doubt §	as Lyle Monroe with Elma Wentz	
1942	The Unpleasant Profession of Jonathan Hoag	as John Riverside	2018 Hugo Award (Retro Hugos: Novella): Nominated
1942	Waldo	as Anson MacDonald	2018 Hugo Award (Retro Hugos: Novella): Won
1942	My Object All Sublime §	as Lyle Monroe	
1942	Goldfish Bowl	as Anson MacDonald	2018 Hugo Award (Retro Hugos: Novelette): Nominated
1942	Pied Piper §	as Lyle Monroe	
1946	Free Men	Published in 1966	2023 Prometheus Award (Hall of Fame Award): Won
1947	Jerry Was a Man		
1947	Water Is for Washing		
1947	Columbus Was a Dope	as Lyle Monroe	
1947	On the Slopes of Vesuvius		
1948	Our Fair City		
1949	Gulf		
1949	Nothing Ever Happens on the Moon		
1950	Destination Moon		
1952	The Year of the Jackpot		
1953	Project Nightmare		
1953	Sky Lift		
1956	A Tenderfoot in Space	Serialized in 1958	
1957	The Man Who Traveled in Elephants	a.k.a. The Elephant Circuit	
1959	'—All You Zombies—'		1979 Balrog Awards (Short Fiction): Nominated
1975	Field Defects: Memo from a Cyborg	Written in 1975, published in 2010	

=== Other short fiction ===
Year	Title	Notes	Awards and nominations
1946	A Bathroom of Her Own		
1947	They Do It with Mirrors	as Simon York	
1947	No Bands Playing, No Flags Flying	Written in 1947, published in 1973	
1949	Poor Daddy		
1950	Cliff and the Calories		
1951	The Bulletin Board		

=== Collections ===
Year	Title	Notes	Awards and nominations
1950	The Man Who Sold the Moon		
1950	Waldo & Magic, Inc.		
1951	The Green Hills of Earth		
1953	Assignment in Eternity		
1953	Revolt in 2100	Contains: If this goes on--, Coventry & Misfit	
1958	The Robert Heinlein Omnibus		
1959	The Menace from Earth		
1959	The Unpleasant Profession of Jonathan Hoag	a.k.a. 6 X H	
1965	Three by Heinlein	Contains: The Puppet Masters, Waldo & Magic, Inc.	
1966	A Robert Heinlein Omnibus		
1966	The Worlds of Robert A. Heinlein		
1967	The Past Through Tomorrow	Almost-complete Future History collection, missing Let There Be Light, Universe & Common Sense	
1973	The Best of Robert A. Heinlein		
1980	Expanded Universe		1981 Locus Award (Collection): Nominated
1980	A Heinlein Trio	Omnibus of The Puppet Masters, Double Star & The Door into Summer	
1999	The Fantasies of Robert A. Heinlein	Omnibus of Waldo & Magic, Inc. and The Unpleasant Profession of Jonathan Hoag	
2003	Infinite Possibilities	Omnibus of Tunnel in the Sky, Time for the Stars & Citizen of the Galaxy	
2004	To the Stars	Omnibus of Between Planets, The Rolling Stones, Starman Jones & The Star Beast	
2005	Off the Main Sequence	Short stories including three never before collected	
2005	Four Frontiers	Omnibus of Rocket Ship Galileo, Space Cadet, Red Planet & Farmer in the Sky	
2006	Outward Bound	Omnibus of Have Space Suit—Will Travel, Starship Troopers & Podkayne of Mars	
2008	Project Moonbase and Others	Collection of screenplays	

==== Complete works ====
- The Virginia Edition, a 46-volume hardcover collection of all of Robert Heinlein's stories, novels, and nonfiction writing, plus a selection of his personal correspondence, was announced by Meisha Merlin Publishing in April 2005; the Robert A. and Virginia Heinlein Prize Trust (which now owns the Heinlein copyrights) instigated the project. Meisha Merlin went out of business in May 2007 after producing six volumes: I Will Fear No Evil, Time Enough for Love, Starship Troopers, For Us, the Living, The Door into Summer, and Double Star.
- The Heinlein Prize Trust then decided to publish the edition itself, having formed the Virginia Edition Publishing Co. for this purpose. As was true for the Meisha Merlin effort, individual volumes are not offered; subscribers must purchase the entire 46-volume set. The final five volumes (including two volumes of screenwriting, both produced and unproduced) were shipped to subscribers in June 2012.
- In July 2007, the Heinlein Prize Trust opened the online Heinlein Archives, which allows people to purchase and download items from the Heinlein Archive previously stored at the University of California-Santa Cruz. The Trust makes grants available to those using the archives for scholarly purposes.

== Poems ==
Year	Title	Notes	Awards and nominations
1946	"Dance Session"	Love poem	
1946	"The Witch's Daughters"		
2003	"The Green Hills of Earth"		
2007	"Atlantis"		
2007	"The Last Adventure"		
2011	"Brave New World"		
2011	"Death Song of a Wood's Colt"	This poem is used 14 years after it was written in Stranger in a Strange Land with one line changed: instead of "My sandy burning eyeballs, as the light within them dims" of the original, Stranger uses, "sanded burning eyeballs, as light within them dims."	
2011	"Three Wise Mice"		
2011	"Untitled Poem Fragment"		

== Foreword ==
Year	Title	Notes	Awards and nominations
1952	Tomorrow, the Stars	Anthology of stories by 14 authors selected by Frederik Pohl and Judith Merril, foreword by Heinlein who got his name on the cover.	

== Nonfiction ==
Year	Title	Notes	Awards and nominations
1952	"Where To?"	Galaxy magazine	
	Two articles for Encyclopædia Britannica on Paul Dirac and antimatter, and on blood chemistry.		
1989	Grumbles from the Grave	Posthumously	1990 Locus Award (Non-Fiction): Won 1990 Hugo Award (Best Related Work): Nominated
1992	Take Back Your Government: A Practical Handbook for the Private Citizen	Originally published as How to Be a Politician	
1992	Tramp Royale		
1980	"Spinoff"	An article based on Heinlein's testimony to the US Congress about the commercialization of inventions created for NASA and the American space program. Published in Omni magazine in 1980; reprinted in Expanded Universe.	

== Filmography ==
- Destination Moon (story from the 1947 book Rocket Ship Galileo, screenplay, technical advisor), 1950, IMDb (Retro Hugo Award, 1951)
- Out There, TV series, 1951 (from three short stories: "The Green Hills of Earth", "Misfit", and "Ordeal in Space")
- Project Moonbase, 1953, IMDb
- The Brain Eaters, 1959 (from the book The Puppet Masters, uncredited, sued by Heinlein), IMDb
- Uchu no Senshi (Japanese animated video series based on Starship Troopers), 1988
- Red Planet, TV miniseries (from the book), 1994, IMDb
- The Puppet Masters, film (from the book), 1994, IMDb
- Starship Troopers, film (very loosely and partially based on the book), 1997, IMDb
- Roughnecks: The Starship Troopers Chronicles, TV series based on the 1997 movie, 1999, IMDb
- Masters of Science Fiction, TV miniseries (from the short story "Jerry Was a Man"), 2007
- Starship Troopers: Invasion, film (very loosely based on the book "Starship Troopers"), 2012, IMDb
- Predestination, film (from the short story "'—All You Zombies—'"), 2014, IMDb
- The Door Into Summer (Japanese title: 夏への扉 キミのいる未来へ Natsu e no Tobira: Kimi no Iru Mirai e), film (from the book), 2021, IMDb

== Spinoffs ==
- The Notebooks of Lazarus Long, illuminated by D. F. Vassallo, 1978
- New Destinies, Vol. VI/Winter 1988—Robert A. Heinlein Memorial Issue, 1988
- Fate's Trick by Matt Costello, 1988, a "game book" inspired by Glory Road
- Requiem: New Collected Works by Robert A. Heinlein and Tributes to the Grand Master, 1992
- Two different Starship Troopers board games were published by Avalon Hill in 1976 and 1997
- The video game Starship Troopers: Terran Ascendancy was published by Blue Tongue Entertainment in 2000
- Dimension X, science fiction radio programs in 1950–1951. Among other writers, episodes were based on Heinlein's Destination Moon (film) (ep. 12), The Green Hills of Earth (ep. 10), Requiem, The Roads Must Roll, and Universe.
- X Minus One, radio series in 1955–1958: Universe
- Language arts materials for teachers based on Heinlein's works, in support of World Space Week, 2005.

== See also ==
- List of Robert A. Heinlein characters
- Heinlein juveniles
