= List of Robert A. Heinlein characters =

This is a list of characters in the fiction of Robert A. Heinlein:

== A ==
- Allucquere (a.k.a. "Mary") – The Puppet Masters
- Security Chief Juan Alvarez – The Moon Is a Harsh Mistress
- Richard Ames (a.k.a. Colin Campbell) – The Cat Who Walks Through Walls
- Sam Anderson – Starman Jones
- Anne (Fair Witness) – Stranger in a Strange Land
- Major Ardmore – Sixth Column
- Pallas Athene, intelligent computer, came to life after the original personality (Minerva) transferred to become a human woman – Time Enough for Love, The Cat Who Walks Through Walls, To Sail Beyond the Sunset

== B ==
- Dr. Hartley M. Baldwin (a.k.a. Gregory "Kettle Belly" Baldwin, "Mr. Two-Canes", "Doc") – Gulf, Friday, The Cat Who Walks Through Walls, Logic of Empire
- Col. Richard Baslim (a.k.a. "Baslim the Cripple") – Citizen of the Galaxy
- Thorby Baslim (a.k.a. Thor B. Rudbek, "Rudbek of Rudbek at Rudbek") – Citizen of the Galaxy
- Gillian Boardman (Jill) – Stranger in a Strange Land
- Joseph Bonforte – Double Star
- Eunice Branca – I Will Fear No Evil
- Jacob Burroughs – The Number of the Beast, The Cat Who Walks Through Walls
- Hilda Burroughs (nee Hilda "Sharpie" Corners) – The Number of the Beast, The Cat Who Walks Through Walls, To Sail Beyond the Sunset
- Thomas and Patrick Bartlett – Time for the Stars

== C ==
- Colonel Colin Campbell (a.k.a. Richard Ames) – The Cat Who Walks Through Walls
- Dejah Thoris "Deety" Burroughs Carter – The Number of the Beast, The Cat Who Walks Through Walls
- Zebadiah John Carter – The Number of the Beast, The Cat Who Walks Through Walls
- Ben Caxton – Stranger in a Strange Land
- Eldreth Coburn – Starman Jones
- Grace Cormet – We Also Walk Dogs
- Hilda Corners – see Hilda Burroughs
- Ed Cowen – The Star Beast
- Cynthia Craig – The Unpleasant Profession of Jonathan Hoag
- Cuddlepup – The Star Beast

== D ==
- John "Johnny" Ezra Dahlquist – "The Long Watch". Referred to as Ezra Dahlquist in Space Cadet.
- Daniel Boone Davis – The Door into Summer
- Hazel Meade Davis (Sadie Lipschitz) (Gwendolyn Novak) The Cat Who Walks Through Walls (see also Hazel Stone below)
- Manuel Garcia O'Kelly Davis (Mannie) – The Moon Is a Harsh Mistress, The Cat Who Walks Through Walls
- Doctor-Livingston-I-Presume (cat) – Farnham's Freehold
- Matt Dodson – Space Cadet
- Dora (computer) – Time Enough for Love, The Number of the Beast, The Cat Who Walks Through Walls
- Dora Smith (Adorable Dora) (Dorable) – Time Enough for Love
- Dorcas – Stranger in a Strange Land
- Dr. Archibald Douglas – Let There Be Light
- Chief Dreiser – The Star Beast

== F ==
- Duke Farnham – Farnham's Freehold
- Grace Farnham – Farnham's Freehold
- Hugh Farnham – Farnham's Freehold
- Karen Farnham – Farnham's Freehold
- Justin Foote – Methuselah's Children
- Justin Foote 45th – Time Enough for Love, The Cat Who Walks Through Walls
- Friday a.k.a. Marjorie Baldwin – Friday
- Clark Fries – Podkayne of Mars
- Podkayne Fries – Podkayne of Mars
- Dr. Ftaeml – The Star Beast
- Fuzzy Britches (flat cat) – The Rolling Stones

== G ==
- Larry Gaines – The Roads Must Roll
- Galahad – Time Enough for Love
- Gay Deceiver – The Number of the Beast, To Sail Beyond the Sunset, The Cat Who Walks Through Walls
- Gekko – Red Planet
- Frederica "Ricky" Gentry – The Door into Summer
- Alec Graham / Alex Hergensheimer – Job: A Comedy of Justice
- Joe Green – Gulf
- Sergei Greenberg – The Star Beast
- Joe-Jim Gregory – Orphans of the Sky
- Oscar Gordon – Glory Road (also appears briefly in The Number of the Beast)

== H ==
- Delos D. Harriman – The Man Who Sold the Moon, Requiem, To Sail Beyond the Sunset
- Jubal Harshaw – Stranger in a Strange Land, The Number of the Beast, The Cat Who Walks Through Walls, To Sail Beyond the Sunset, Citizen of the Galaxy (as James J. Garsh)
- Don Harvey – Between Planets
- Gretchen Henderson, daughter of Ingrid and Jinx Henderson – The Moon Is a Harsh Mistress, The Cat Who Walks Through Walls, To Sail Beyond the Sunset
- Ingrid Henderson Jinx Henderson's wife, direct descendant of Hazel Stone – The Cat Who Walks Through Walls
- Jinx Henderson, born John Black Eagle, took Ingrid Henderson's surname when he married her – The Cat Who Walks Through Walls
- Wolf Henderson, Ingrid and Jinx Henderson's son – The Cat Who Walks Through Walls
- Alex Hergensheimer / Alec Graham – Job: A Comedy of Justice
- Mortimer "Mort the Wart" Hobart – The Moon Is a Harsh Mistress
- Mycroft "Mike" Holmes (a.k.a. Adam Selene, Mychelle Holmes) – The Moon Is a Harsh Mistress
- Myra Holtz – The Star Beast
- Ira Howard – Methuselah's Children
- Jonathan Hoag – The Unpleasant Profession of Jonathan Hoag
- Hugh Hoyland – Orphans of the Sky

== J ==
- William 'Tex' Jarman – Space Cadet
- Oscar Jensen – Space Cadet
- Maureen Johnson – see Maureen Johnson Smith, below
- Joseph – Farnham's Freehold
- Max Jones – Starman Jones
- Zebadiah Jones – If This Goes On—

== K ==
- Karen – Gulf
- Henry Gladstone Kiku – The Star Beast
- Wyoming "Wyoh" Knott – The Moon Is a Harsh Mistress

== L ==
- Stuart Rene LaJoie – The Moon Is a Harsh Mistress
- Andrew Jackson Libby, later Elizabeth A. J. Libby Long – Misfit, Methuselah's Children, Time Enough for Love, The Cat Who Walks Through Walls. Also known as "Slipstick" Libby, and in Misfit, has the nickname "Pinky". The Number of the Beast
- Elizabeth Andrew Jackson Libby Long (originally Andrew Jackson Libby) – The Number of the Beast a.k.a. "Pinky" and "Slipstick"
- Maureen Johnson Smith Long – see Maureen Johnson Smith, below
- Lapis Lazuli Long – Time Enough for Love, The Number of the Beast
- Llita – Time Enough for Love
- Lazarus Long (a.k.a. Woodrow Wilson Smith) – Methuselah's Children, Time Enough for Love, The Number of the Beast, The Cat Who Walks Through Walls, To Sail Beyond the Sunset
- Lorelei Lee Long – Time Enough for Love, The Number of the Beast
- Lummox – The Star Beast
- John Lyle – If This Goes On—

== M ==
- Mr. MacClure – The Star Beast
- Dr. Mahmoud (a.k.a. "Stinky") – Stranger in a Strange Land
- Margrethe – Job: A Comedy of Justice
- Jim Marlowe – Red Planet
- Dr. Mary Lou Martin – Let There Be Light
- Mary (a.k.a. "Allucquere") – The Puppet Masters
- Helen Mayberry – Time Enough for Love
- Gloria McNye – "Delilah and the Space Rigger"
- Memtok – Farnham's Freehold
- Minerva – intelligent computer used to run the planet Secundus, later transformed into a human woman – Time Enough for Love, The Cat Who Walks Through Walls, To Sail Beyond the Sunset
- Miriam – Stranger in a Strange Land
- Frank Mitsui – Sixth Column
- Mycroft – see Mycroft "Mike" Holmes, above, The Moon Is a Harsh Mistress
- Mother Thing – Have Space Suit—Will Travel

== N ==
- Nehemiah Scudder – Logic of Empire
- Andrew Nivens, a.k.a. "The Old Man" – The Puppet Masters (his name is not mentioned, only inferred – the President calls him Andrew and his son's last name is Nivens)
- Elihu Nivens, a.k.a. Sam Cavanaugh – The Puppet Masters
- Gwen Novak – The Cat Who Walks Through Walls
- Dr. Sven Nelson – Stranger in a Strange Land

== O ==
- Judge O'Farrell – The Star Beast

== P ==
- Bernardo de la Paz (Prof) – The Moon Is a Harsh Mistress
- Patty Paiwonski – Stranger in a Strange Land
- Penny – Double Star
- Petronius The Arbiter a.k.a. Pete (cat) – The Door into Summer
- Peewee – Have Space Suit—Will Travel
- Longcourt Phyllis – Beyond This Horizon
- Hugo Pinero – Life-Line
- Pixel (cat) – The Cat Who Walks Through Walls, To Sail Beyond the Sunset
- Ponse, The Lord Protector – Farnham's Freehold
- Pug – Glory Road

== R ==
- Random Numbers (Cat) – To Sail Beyond the Sunset
- Rhysling, "Blind singer of the spaceways" – The Green Hills of Earth, Time Enough for Love
- Juan Rico – Starship Troopers
- Wes Robbins – The Star Beast
- Rufo – Glory Road, The Cat Who Walks Through Walls
- Clifford "Kip" Russell – Have Space Suit—Will Travel

== S ==
- Nehemiah Scudder – If This Goes On—
- Johann Sebastian Bach Smith (later Joan Eunice Smith Solomon) – I Will Fear No Evil
- Sister Maggie – If This Goes On—
- Maureen Johnson Smith – Time Enough for Love, The Cat Who Walks Through Walls, To Sail Beyond the Sunset, The Number of the Beast
- Valentine Michael Smith – Stranger in a Strange Land
- Woodrow Wilson Smith – birth name of Lazarus Long (see above)
- Lawrence Smythe (The Great Lorenzo) – Double Star
- Jacob Moshe Solomon – I Will Fear No Evil
- Betty Sorenson – The Star Beast
- Mary Sperling – Methuselah's Children, Time Enough for Love
- Star, a.k.a. Her Wisdom – Glory Road, The Cat Who Walks Through Walls
- Lowell "Buster" Stone – The Rolling Stones, The Cat Who Walks Through Walls (inferred; "Hazel's youngest grandson" is the doctor treating Richard)
- Castor Stone – The Rolling Stones, The Number of the Beast, The Cat Who Walks Through Walls
- Edith Stone – The Rolling Stones
- Hazel Stone – The Rolling Stones, The Moon Is a Harsh Mistress, The Number of the Beast, The Cat Who Walks Through Walls (see also Hazel Meade Davis, above)
- Meade Stone – The Rolling Stones
- Pollux Stone – The Rolling Stones, The Number of the Beast, The Cat Who Walks Through Walls
- Roger Stone - The Rolling Stones
- John Thomas Stuart – The Star Beast

== T ==
- John Thomas – The Star Beast
- Dejah Thoris – see Dejah Carter, above
- Colonel Towers – The Long Watch

== V ==
- Becky Vesey (a.k.a. Madame Alexandra Vesant) – Stranger in a Strange Land
- "Shorty" Van Kleeck – The Roads Must Roll

== W ==
- Rod Walker – Tunnel in the Sky
- Ira Weatheral – Time Enough for Love
- Barbara Wells – Farnham's Freehold
- Willis (Bouncer) – Red Planet
- Wingate – Logic of Empire

== Z ==
- Charles Zim – Starship Troopers
