= D.A. (novella) =

D.A. is a science fiction novella by Connie Willis. It was originally published in the anthology Space Cadets, edited by Mike Resnick. It tells the story of an unwilling recruit to the Space Academy, with nods and references to the works of Robert Heinlein, who wrote similar stories for the juvenile market.

== Plot ==
Theodora Baumgarten is a high-performer in her final year at Winfrey High School in Colorado, working towards admission to UCLA. Her friends at school are starstruck by the prospect of any one of their number, particularly the ambitious Coriander Abrams, succeeding in their application to the Space Academy. Theodora hates the very idea of traveling off Earth. When a recruiter for the IASA speaks at the school, Theodora makes a point of asking why anyone would want to put up with the conditions and risks of space flight. She receives no response, except for an odd look from the recruiter.

At an assembly to celebrate the induction of a student to the Academy, Theodora is horrified when the name announced is her own. She is effectively "shanghaied" by a legally binding contract that she never saw or signed. Her friend Kimkim, a "computer genius", promises to find a way to contact her at the Academy, which operates under high security.

Theodora is whisked away to the space port. Her every effort to speak to someone leads to her being put aboard the rocket leaving for the "RAH", the Academy space station Robert A. Heinlein. She endures sickness and vomiting during the journey, while her companion and future bunk mate Libby chatters enthusiastically about the life ahead. Aboard the RAH, disoriented from the way the Coriolis force affects her sense of balance, she does her best to attend classes and find private space to talk to Kimkim, who is able to hack through the system to reach Theodora's phone and access the Academy records database.

Kimkim discovers several cases like Theodora's, of cadets who never applied but were selected and sent to training. Most are still in service or at the Academy. All have the notation "D.A." attached to their record. Theodora, meanwhile, has noticed things about the Academy that she would definitely want to change.

When it seems that Theodora will finally be allowed home, she meets the Academy Commander, who is the recruiter she questioned before. Instead of resigning, she announces that she knows what "D.A." means and why she was drafted in the first place.

== References to other works ==
Apart from the name of the Academy space station, there are some subtle nods to Robert Heinlein's works. "Libby", Theodora's enthusiastic bunk mate, is also the name of Andrew Jackson "Slipstick" Libby, a character first introduced in Heinlein's coming-of-age short story Misfit, appearing later in Methuselah's Children and other novels. Theodora herself is an intelligent, independent teenager like Holly Jones in the short story The Menace from Earth.

Theodora's father's name is "Bob", while a classmate at Winfrey High is Fletcher Davis. "Davis" is the family name of the protagonist, Manuel Garcia O'Kelly Davis in the novel The Moon Is a Harsh Mistress, and also of the protagonist Daniel Boone Davis in the novel The Door into Summer.

== Reviews ==
- Publishers Weekly, reviewing the chapbook edition, wrote "Willis (Inside Job ) turns a cherished SF theme completely inside out."
- Kirkus Reviews, in a review of the three story collection, Terra Incognita (2018), commented that "D.A. pays homage to—or perhaps thumbs its nose at—the coming-of-age space opera.", and called it "the shortest and most delightful" of the stories in the book.
