= Cheops law =

Adage written by Robert A. Heinlein

Cheops law is an adage or epigram that is typically stated as, Nothing ever gets built on schedule or within budget.

Written by Robert A. Heinlein; attributed to his fictitious character Lazarus Long in Time Enough for Love (1973) and later in The Notebooks Of Lazarus Long.

== See also ==
- Hofstadter's law: "It always takes longer than you expect, even when you take into account Hofstadter's Law."
