= Woodrow Wilson Smith =

Woodrow Wilson Smith may refer to:

- Woodrow Wilson Smith, birthname of Lazarus Long, fictional character from R. A. Heinlein's books
- Woodrow Wilson Smith, pseudonym of Henry Kuttner (1915–1958), American science fiction author
