= Job: A Comedy of Justice =

1984 SF novel by Robert A. Heinlein

- Cover of first edition (hardcover)
- Author: Robert A. Heinlein
- Cover artist: Michael Whelan
- Language: English
- Genre: Science fiction
- Publisher: Ballantine Books/Del Rey
- Publication date: 1984
- Publication place: United States
- Media type: Print (hardback & paperback)
- Pages: 376
- Award: Locus Award for Best Fantasy Novel (1985)
- ISBN: 0-345-31357-7 (first edition, hardback)
- OCLC: 10507672

Job: A Comedy of Justice is a science fiction novel by American writer Robert A. Heinlein published in 1984. The title is a reference to the biblical Book of Job and James Branch Cabell's book Jurgen, A Comedy of Justice. It won the Locus Award for Best Fantasy Novel in 1985 and was nominated for the Nebula Award for Best Novel in 1984, and the Hugo Award for Best Novel in 1985.

== Plot summary ==
The story examines religion through the eyes of Alex, a Christian political activist who is corrupted by Margrethe, a Danish Norse cruise ship hostess—and who loves every minute of it. Enduring a shipwreck, an earthquake, and a series of world-changes brought about by Loki (with Jehovah's permission), Alex and Marga work their way from Mexico back to Kansas as dishwasher and waitress.

Whenever they manage to make some stake, an inconveniently timed change into a new alternate reality throws them off their stride (once, the money they earned is left behind in another reality; in another case, the paper money earned in a Mexico which is an empire is worthless in another Mexico which is a republic). These repeated misfortunes, clearly effected by some malevolent entity, make the hero identify with the Biblical Job.

On the way they unknowingly enjoy the Texas hospitality of Satan himself, but as they near their destination they are separated by the Rapture — Margrethe worships Odin, and pagans do not go to Heaven. Finding that the reward for his faith, eternity as promised in the Book of Revelation, is worthless without her, Alex journeys through timeless space in search of his lost lady, taking him to Hell and beyond.

Heinlein depicts a Heaven ruled by snotty angels and a Hell where everyone has a wonderful, or at least productive, time — with Mary Magdalene shuttling breezily between both places.

The novel is linked to Heinlein's short story "They" by the term "the Glaroon", and to his earlier novel The Moon Is a Harsh Mistress by referring to the Moon colonies "Luna City" and "Tycho Under".

Throughout the novel, Alex briefly describes the history of his own world, and of some of the worlds he visits. In his own world, William Jennings Bryan was elected US President in 1896, the United States avoided war during the 20th century, and Germany is still a monarchy. John F. Kennedy was never President, as revealed when Alex visits a world where Kennedy served two full terms and is unfamiliar with him. Airship travel was never supplanted by airplane travel, and the television was not invented. Other trivial information about Alex's world and the other worlds he visits is revealed as the novel goes along.

== Reception ==
In Issue 31 of Abyss, Dave Nalle commented that this book "shows that Heinlein can still produce new characters and ideas while keeping a story interesting." However, Nalle also noted, "It is a bit soppy, soft on science, and tied up with the big questions of Life, and not really finding any answers." Despite this, Nalle concluded, "If you liked Time Enough for Love, Door into Summer, or Glory Road, Job is a nice reminder of the type of skill with which Heinlein can stimulate the intellect and imagination without being heavy handed about it."

David Langford reviewed Job: A Comedy of Justice for White Dwarf #61, and stated that "When blasphemy stops being witty and shocking, it tends to become pointless, like dingy graffiti scrawled on church walls. I didn't dislike this one, but . . . wait for the paperback, eh?"

=== Awards ===
- Nebula Award nominee, 1984
- Hugo Award nominee, 1985
- Locus Award for Fantasy Novel, 1985
