= The Puppet Masters =

1951 science fiction novel by Robert A. Heinlein

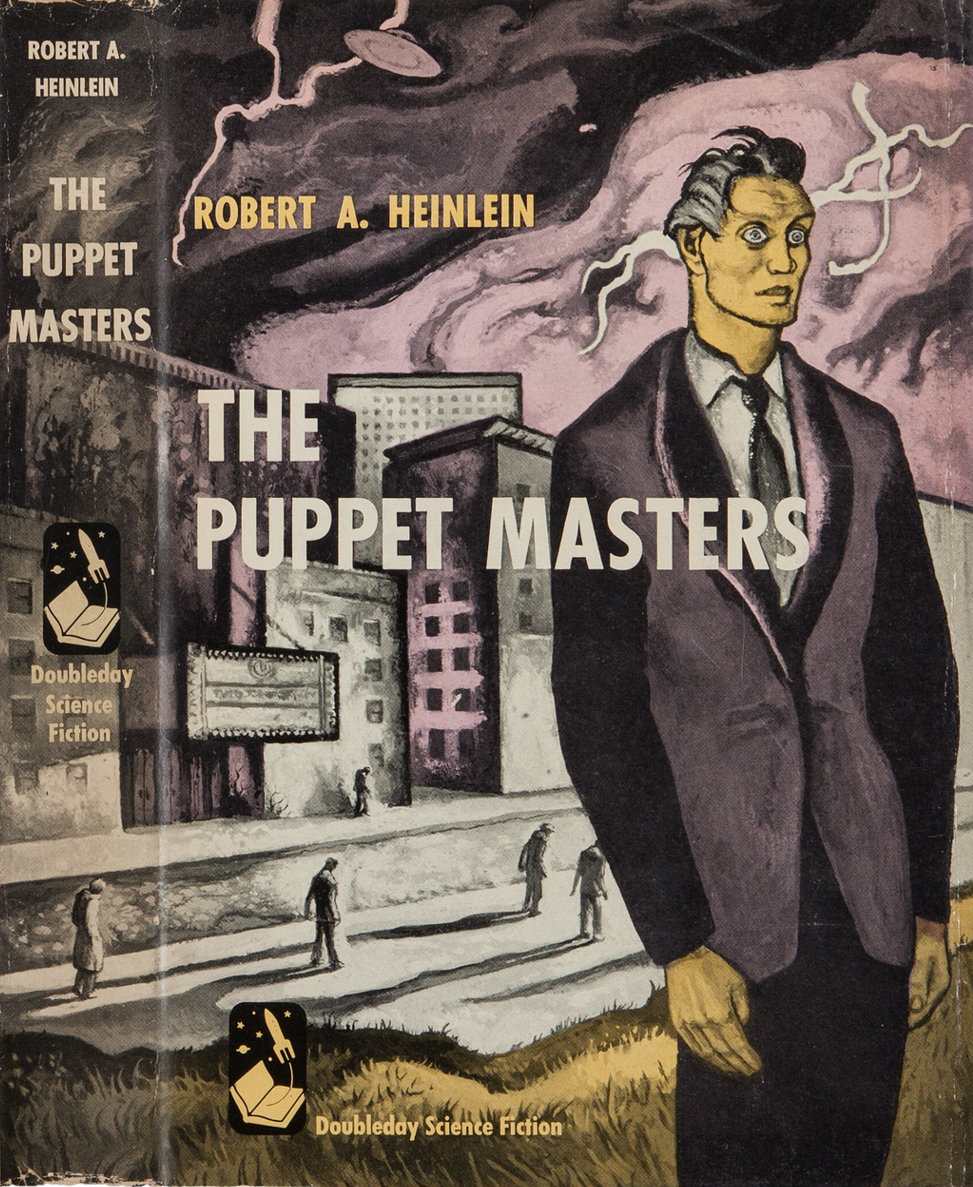
- US first edition dust jacket cover
- Author: Robert A. Heinlein
- Cover artist: Ley Kenyon
- Language: English
- Genre: Science fiction
- Publisher: Doubleday
- Publication date: 1951
- Publication place: United States
- Media type: Print (hardback & paperback)

The Puppet Masters is a 1951 science fiction novel by American writer Robert A. Heinlein, in which American secret agents battle parasitic invaders from outer space. It was originally serialized in Galaxy Science Fiction (September, October, and November 1951).

The novel evokes a sense of paranoia and Heinlein repeatedly makes explicit the analogy between the mind-controlling parasites and the Communist Russians, echoing the prevailing Second Red Scare in the United States. The book takes up the then common theme of sightings of flying saucers, the plot assuming that the "saucers" seen in the 1950s were part of a preliminary reconnaissance of Earth, carried out by the extraterrestrials in preparation for a full-fledged invasion sixty years later.

== Background ==
The novel starts in 2007. Following a nuclear war between the Soviet Union and the Western Bloc, which left both sides battered but unbroken, both sides return to a state of Cold War. Washington, D.C., and other US cities devastated in nuclear strikes had been completely rebuilt. The Soviet Union and China remain a single bloc dominated by Moscow, and the sharp Sino-Soviet split of the late 1950s never happened.

Social customs have changed somewhat, in a way typical for Heinlein's fiction (i.e. having become more liberal, such as marriage contracts being possible with fixed terms, etc.) and ray guns and personal flying cars are commonplace. "Slug throwing guns" remain in possession of some private citizens, but are considered obsolete by professionals. Space stations exist and colonies have been established on the planet Venus (depicted, as common in science fiction of the time, as a tropical planet habitable by humans). Most agents carry a tube of a wakefulness-promoting drug known as "tempus fugit." Although it is considered not habit-forming, it does produce a mild euphoria, but is mostly used to stretch out the user's subjective perception of time 'by a factor of ten or more'.

Space technology is far more advanced than in the actual first decade of the 21st century. For example, in the last scene, a space warship is sent on a twelve-year trip to Titan, with not only life-support for a large crew, but also enough armaments to confront an entire world on its own.

However, communications satellites have not been thought of, and television broadcasts are still limited to line-of-sight, as they were at the time of writing. This is of critical importance to the plot. The territory of the United States is divided into numerous transmission blocks, which receive television broadcasts from their neighbors and relay them onwards. When the invaders seize one of these blocks, they effectively control all communications within it and can isolate its inhabitants from the outside world, deny the central government any access to them, and consolidate control at their leisure.

The current president—on his second term—had established directly upon being first elected a new intelligence agency, known as the Section. Its creation was never authorized by Congress and its existence is kept secret, being funded by sums diverted from innocuous sounding items in the budget. It has a disguised underground headquarters in Washington, D.C., and a network of similarly disguised branch offices around the US. Unlike the clearly demarked spheres of the FBI and CIA, the Section carries out extensive espionage in Soviet territory but also conducts operations inside the United States. If ordered to, its agents are ready to shoot and kill American citizens on US soil. The Section's Director, who had been the president's campaign manager, is universally called "The Old Man". Only gradually does the reader learn that he is the protagonist's actual father.

== Plot ==
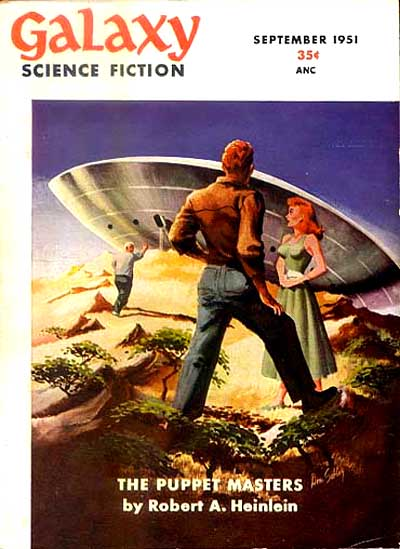
The opening installment of The Puppet Masters took the cover of the September 1951 issue of Galaxy Science Fiction

In the summer of 2007, Earth is under attack. Slug-like creatures, arriving in flying saucers, are attaching themselves to people's backs, taking control of their victims' nervous systems, and manipulating those people as puppets. The Old Man, the head of a clandestine national security agency called the Section, goes to Des Moines, Iowa, with Sam and Mary, two of his best agents, to investigate a flying saucer report, but much more seriously the ominous disappearance of the six agents sent previously. They discover that "the slugs" are steadily taking over Des Moines, but they cannot convince the US president to declare an emergency.

Sam takes two other agents and returns to Des Moines to get more evidence of the invasion. They fail and are forced to flee quickly, but in the confusion, a slug gains control of one of the agents. Back in Washington the team discovers the slug and captures it, but later it escapes and attaches itself to Sam, using Sam's skills and knowledge to make a clean escape.

While under control, Sam uses the Constitution Club—whose membership includes many important members of the city's political elite—to gain more hosts for the slugs. The Old Man captures him, takes him to Section's new headquarters, and later coerces Sam into allowing himself to be possessed by the slug again. Under drug-induced hypnosis, Sam reveals that the slugs come from Titan, the sixth moon of Saturn. Later the Section exposes several possessed congressmen at a session of Congress, finally persuading the Congress that the United States is under attack. The law is passed requiring people to have bare backs to demonstrate that they are not carrying slugs.

The Army prepares a counterattack in the most heavily infested areas, planning to take over most broadcast centers and reveal the truth to the local residents. Sam drives alone to Kansas City and discovers that the slugs now possess almost all residents. He returns to Washington too late to stop the operation, which fails; the invading soldiers are either killed or captured by the slugs.

Sam and Mary take a short leave, get married and have a happy honeymoon that is interrupted by a slug that seems to have been targeting Sam for repossession. They return to work and discover that people are now required to be practically naked as the slugs learned to attach themselves to other body parts. Together with the Old Man, they go to Pass Christian, Mississippi, to inspect a flying saucer that had made a bad landing. Inside the alien ship, Mary is overwhelmed by repressed memories from the time she was a child on Venus and had been possessed by a slug. The slug had died from "nine-day fever", a deadly disease native to Venus.

Learning that the disease kills slugs faster than their human hosts, the authorities adopt biological warfare and release infected apes into enemy-held territory. Slugs possess the apes and then quickly transmit the disease to each other. Several carefully timed days later, thousands of volunteers are parachuted to administer the cure to those people whose slugs have died. Sam and the Old Man join the effort in Jefferson City, Missouri.

The Old Man gets possessed by the last healthy slug in the city, captures Sam and escapes in an air-car heading to the Yucatán, where the slug intends to restart its effort to conquer humanity. Sam manages to kill the slug and crash the air-car.

Some years later, Sam and Mary board a spaceship headed for Saturn to take the offensive. Sam expresses the hope that a way would be found to save the small elf-like hosts whom the slugs enslaved.

== Characters ==
- Sam, born Elihu Nivens, is the classic Heinlein hero, multi-talented, independent, fiercely loyal to friends and an implacable enemy to foes. He is thirtyish, but has changed appearance so many times even he has doubts as to how he originally looked.
- Mary, born Allucquere in a religious commune in Antarctica before growing up on Venus, is Heinlein's classic heroine. She is beautiful, red-headed, hard-nosed and brilliant. Sam describes her as having the "real redheaded saurian bony structure to her skull". Her professional exterior conceals psychological scars from her encounter with the slugs as a child. Only the Old Man knows the truth about her, thanks to the deep hypnotic analysis that all agents have to undergo.
- The Old Man, born Andrew Nivens, is the head of a top secret government agency that he wishes did not have to exist, doing his job reluctantly because nobody else would do it properly. He represents the third of Heinlein's favorite types of character, the "wise, grumpy old man". He is the first in the line that includes Jubal Harshaw, Professor Bernardo de la Paz, Johann Sebastian Bach Smith, "Kettle Belly" Baldwin, and the later life of Lazarus Long.

== Alternative version ==
Heinlein's original version of the novel was 96,000 words, and was cut to 72,000 words for both the 1951 book version and the serialization in Galaxy Science Fiction. For the Galaxy version, editor H. L. Gold also did extensive rewriting, to which Heinlein strenuously objected.

In 1990, two years after Heinlein's death, an expanded version was published with the consent of his widow, Virginia Heinlein. This edition contained material that had been cut from the original published version, because the book was deemed to be too long and controversial for the market in 1951. The uncut version seemed more risqué in 1951 than it did decades later. For example, in the uncut version the book begins with Sam waking up in bed with a blonde whom he had casually picked up the evening before, without even bothering to learn her name; the older version omitted all mention of her. The 1951 version does mention that men possessed by the invaders lost all sexual feeling—an essential element in the early parts of the plot; the original publisher completely cut out a reference to the "puppet masters" later discovering human sexuality and embarking upon wild orgies, broadcast live on television in the areas under their control. Also all references to the Soviet Union were eliminated.

== Reception ==
Boucher and McComas characterized The Puppet Masters as "a thunderously exciting melodrama of intrigue", noting that Heinlein displayed "not only his usual virtues of clear logic, rigorous detail-work, and mastery of indirect exposition", but also unexpected virtues like "a startling facility in suspense devices [and] a powerful ingenuity in plotting". P. Schuyler Miller, noting that the novel's "climactic situations seem to be telegraphed", suggested that Heinlein presented his background situations so effectively that readers solve the story's mysteries more quickly than Heinlein allowed his characters to. In his "Books" column for The Magazine of Fantasy & Science Fiction, Damon Knight selected the novel as one of the 10 best SF books of the 1950s.

== Adaptations ==
The Brain Eaters, a 1958 science fiction film directed by Bruno VeSota, bore a number of similarities to Heinlein's novel. Heinlein sued the film's producers, including executive producer Roger Corman, for plagiarism, asking $150,000 in damages. The case was settled out of court for $5,000, which included Heinlein's stipulation that his name not be used on screen or in any way with the production. The case halted actor John Payne's intention of producing a film based on Heinlein's novel.

The theme of the novel is echoed in "The Invisibles", an episode of The Outer Limits aired in 1964, and also in "Operation -- Annihilate!", the last episode of the first season of Star Trek in 1967. Similarly, in the story line begun in the Star Trek: The Next Generation episode "Coming of Age" and completed in "Conspiracy", aliens from a faraway sector invade the bodies of high-ranking Starfleet admirals in an attempt to compromise the command structure and spearhead an invasion of Earth.

The novel was adapted, with some plot and character changes, into the 1994 film of the same name.

== Influence ==
The Body Snatchers by Jack Finney (1954) takes up a similar premise of extraterrestrials taking over the bodies of humans (inspiring several film adaptations). Also in the plot of the 1956 What Mad Universe by Fredric Brown—as in that of Puppet Masters—police and vigilantes ruthlessly shoot down anyone suspected of being controlled by the book's invaders from space.

Kenneth Von Gunden's novel Star Spawn takes up the basic premise of The Puppet Masters and transfers it to a medieval setting. Extraterrestrial parasites able to take over the bodies of humans and control them invade Medieval England and embark on conquering it, castle by castle—and are eventually foiled by the highly resourceful Friar Gregory and his friend Sir Morrough the Knight.

N. K. Jemisin's short story "Walking Awake," included in her short story collection How Long 'til Black Future Month?, is a response to Heinlein's novel. The story follows Sadie, a caregiver who is complicit in a system that raises human hosts for alien parasitic beings (beings we later learn are not aliens, but were created by humanity in the distant past).

Stephenie Meyer's novel The Host (2008) reprises the alien parasite premise from the point of view of the invaders.

== General and cited sources ==
- Clute, John, and David Pringle. "Heinlein, Robert A." The Encyclopedia of Science Fiction. Eds. John Clute, David Langford, Peter Nicholls and Graham Sleight. Gollancz, 22 Oct. 2014. Accessed 27 Oct. 2014.
- Holdstock, Robert, ed., Encyclopedia of Science Fiction, London: Cathay Books, p. 109, ISBN 0-86178-186-4, 1978.
- Tuck, Donald H. (1974). The Encyclopedia of Science Fiction and Fantasy. Chicago: Advent. p. 215. ISBN 0-911682-20-1.
- Warren, Bill. Keep Watching the Skies: American Science Fiction Films of the Fifties, 21st Century Edition. Jefferson, North Carolina: McFarland & Company, 2009. ISBN 0-89950-032-3.
