= Friday (novel) =

1982 science fiction novel by Robert A. Heinlein

- First edition cover.
- Author: Robert A. Heinlein
- Cover artist: Richard M. Powers
- Language: English
- Genre: Science fiction
- Publisher: Holt, Rinehart and Winston
- Publication date: April 1982
- Publication place: United States
- Media type: Print (Hardback and Paperback)
- Pages: 368
- ISBN: 0-03-061516-X (first edition, hardback)
- OCLC: 7875946
- Dewey Decimal: 813/.54 19
- LC Class: PS3515.E288 F77 1982

Friday is a 1982 science fiction novel by American writer Robert A. Heinlein. It is the story of a female "artificial person", the eponymous Friday, genetically engineered to be stronger, faster, smarter, and generally better than normal humans. Artificial humans are widely resented, and much of the story deals with Friday's struggle both against prejudice and to conceal her enhanced attributes from other humans. The story is set in a Balkanized 21st century, in which the nations of the North American continent have been split up into a number of smaller states.

Friday was nominated for the Nebula Award for Best Novel and the Hugo Award for Best Novel in 1983.

== Plot summary ==
The book's narrator is Friday Jones (often going under cover name Marjorie Baldwin and using both surnames somewhat interchangeably). Friday is a genetically engineered human (known as an Artificial Person or AP) in many ways mentally and physically superior to ordinary humans. There is great prejudice against APs so Friday conceals her nature.

Friday is employed as a highly self-sufficient "combat courier in a quasi-military organization", traveling across the globe and to some of the near-Earth space colonies. She is returning from her latest mission when she is captured, tortured, raped and interrogated by an enemy group. She is rescued by her own people, who tell her that her highly critical mission was successful as her captors failed to find the data she was carrying in her body.

After recovering from the ordeal, Friday takes a vacation to New Zealand to visit her group family, composed of several husbands and wives and many children. In an argument over racism, Friday reveals to her family that she is an AP, and they promptly divorce her.

On the way back to her company's headquarters, she meets and befriends a married couple, the Tormeys, and their extra-legal co-husband, Georges. Friday is their house-guest in British Canada (a country in the Balkanized North America) when a worldwide emergency known as Red Thursday occurs. Various groups claim credit for the assassinations and sabotage, but Friday later learns that it is the result of a struggle between rival factions within the ultra-powerful Shipstone corporation.

With British Canada under martial law, Friday kills a policeman who tries to arrest her and Georges as non-citizens to be interned. The two become fugitives, and Friday travels through the California Confederacy, the Lone Star Republic (where she parts from Georges), and the Chicago Imperium as she attempts to reach her headquarters. After several adventures, she abandons her attempt to make contact with her employer and then finds that the Tormeys are not at their home. An agent of her employer tracks her down and takes her to her employer's safe house. However, Friday's boss soon dies and the organization disbands, rendering her temporarily homeless and unemployed. Her boss has left her money in trust to be used only for the purpose of relocating to an off-Earth colony of her choosing. A letter he left for her to read after his death tells her that in his opinion Earth is just before a new Dark Age; that there is nothing on Earth for her, which is why she should emigrate off-planet; and that he is very, very proud that some bits of her genetic makeup came from him and that although he could not say so while he was alive and her employer, he loved her as a daughter.

Living in Las Vegas Free State, Friday is eventually recruited for a courier job which will incidentally allow her to visit and evaluate several of the colonies she is considering as future homes. However, on an interplanetary cruise ship for her mission, she learns that agents of her new employers are watching her, and that she is a virtual prisoner in the ship. Realizing that her mission is top secret and her employers misled her about it, she fears that they will kill her when it is over. While the ship is in orbit at a rustic colony world, she escapes with the Tormeys, who have been on the run since the policeman's death and happened to be fleeing Earth on the same ship. She is helped and joined in her escape by two of the agents watching her, a male who was in the group that raped her at the beginning of the story but is now repentant; the other of whom is a woman who masqueraded as Friday's maidservant; and both of whom are APs, which is why they were recruited for the mission.

After evading the ship's crew and the remaining agents, Friday and her friends settle in the colony to lead a quiet life as a group family. Friday, to her great surprise, finds herself as a community leader.

== Allusions and references to other works ==
Friday is loosely tied to Heinlein's 1949 novella Gulf, since the works share characters—"Kettle Belly" Baldwin is Friday's boss, and Mr. and Mrs. Joseph Greene are mentioned as two of Friday's genetic progenitors. The motif of a secret superman society in Gulf, however, is not mentioned in Friday, where the heroine is an artificial person and is not part of a secret society; the principal reason to be secret about her artificial nature is to avoid discrimination. However, Baldwin's bequest to finance her emigration to any planet excludes Olympia, where the "supermen" went at some time between the two stories.

The Shipstone, the extrasolar colonies Fiddler's Green, Proxima and Botany Bay, and the start of the balkanization of North America are again mentioned in the 1985 The Cat Who Walks Through Walls. It is stated that Roger and Edith Stone from The Rolling Stones are now living in Fiddler's Green. The colony named "Botany Bay" appears in Heinlein's juvenile Time for the Stars. (There is a planet called "Halcyon" in Starman Jones, but it is in a different star system from the one in Friday.)

== Literary significance and reception ==
The 1982 Library Journal review said that Heinlein "returns to an earlier style of brisk adventure mixed with polemic in the saga of special courier Friday Jones."

Dave Pringle reviewed Friday for Imagine magazine, and stated that "I was prepared to like this novel—advance notices and reviews have all trumpeted the fact that it is Heinlein's best in many years—and indeed it moves well, but I found it left a curiously bad taste in my mouth."

John Clute in The Encyclopedia of Science Fiction says of it (and the following Job: A Comedy of Justice): "Two late novels [...] were hailed with some relief by Heinlein admirers despite not equalling the drive and clarity of his best work."

Charles Stross has stated that his 2008 novel Saturn's Children is an homage to Friday.

Jo Walton wrote of Friday in 2009 as "The worst book I love": "It's a book about passing, about what makes you human. ... What's good about it now? The whole 'passing' bit. The cloning, the attitudes to cloning, the worry about jobs. The economy. It has an interesting future world [...] and as always with Heinlein it's immersive. [...] And it's a fun read, even if it's ultimately unsatisfying. What's wrong with it is that it doesn't have a plot. [...] Heinlein's ability to write a sentence that makes you want to read the next sentence remains unparalleled. But the book as a whole is almost like Dhalgren. Every sentence and every paragraph and page and chapter lead on to the next, but it's just one thing after another, there's no real connection going on. It has no plot, it's a set of incidents that look as if they're going somewhere and don't ever resolve, just stop. [...] It sets things up that it never invokes, most notably Olympia and the connections back to the novella 'Gulf.'"

Dave Langford reviewed Friday for White Dwarf #39, and stated that "Friday has a good future background, where all-powerful 'corporate states' on the lines of IBM think nothing of nuking pockets of undue sales resistance; lots to annoy even the least committed feminist (being raped is fine, thinks heroine Friday—if only the guy doesn't have bad breath); and a plotline with all the forceful thrust of overcooked spaghetti."

=== Awards and nominations ===
Friday received nominations for the following awards

- Nebula Award for Best Novel of 1982
- 1983 Hugo Award for Best Novel
- 1983 Locus Award for Science Fiction Novel
- 1983 Prometheus Award for Best Novel

== Sources ==
- "Robert Heinlein: The Novels". The Robert A. Heinlein Page.
- "Friday". Robert A. Heinlein: Dean of Science Fiction Writers. Archived from the original on May 14, 2013.
- "Robert A. & Virginia G. Heinlein Papers" (PDF). Online Archive of California. 2007. p. 2.
