= Hazel Stone =

Fictional character

Hazel Stone is a fictional character created by Robert A. Heinlein and featured in The Rolling Stones, The Moon Is a Harsh Mistress, The Cat Who Walks Through Walls, and other novels.

== Appearances ==
=== The Rolling Stones ===
Hazel's first published appearance was as Hazel Stone in The Rolling Stones (1952), where she lives on the Moon with her son, his wife, and their four children. She is portrayed as a cantankerous but capable woman who cares fiercely for her family. She makes many boasts about her youth, in particular her role in the founding of the government ("I know there is free speech on Luna—I wrote it into the constitution myself!"), and complains about the kind of people living in Luna now.

She helps her twin grandsons, Castor and Pollux, convince their father to take the family on a tour of the Solar System. When she departs Luna, she is honored as one of the founders at a reception held by the mayor. She convinces her son to extend the tour, and helps to pay for it by taking over his role as the author of the space opera serial The Scourge of the Spaceways, starring Captain John Sterling. At the end of the novel, the family departs the asteroid belt to head to Saturn.

=== The Moon Is a Harsh Mistress ===
The character later appears in The Moon Is a Harsh Mistress (1966), which tells the story of the Lunar Revolution and bears out some of her claims. She first appears as a prepubescent child at an anti-government rally, and when armed government agents raid the rally, she is noticed by the main character to be among those who jump into the fight. He later sees her and learns that she is Hazel Meade, an orphan living and working at a crèche. She is recruited into the underground organization plotting to overthrow the government, and is placed in charge of the "Baker Street Irregulars", a group of small children used for observation and distribution of propaganda. She is also one of the people who sign the Lunar Declaration of Independence, and is adopted by the narrator and his family (he is part of a group marriage). At the end of the novel, she marries into the Stone family. (Her maiden name, Meade, is also the name of her granddaughter in The Rolling Stones.)

=== The Number of the Beast and The Cat Who Walks Through Walls ===
Hazel appears briefly in The Number of the Beast (1980), where she is brought into the larger Heinlein multiverse and interacts with other characters from unrelated Heinlein novels. In The Cat Who Walks Through Walls (1985), Gwen Novak, the female lead, reveals that she is actually Hazel Stone, sent to recruit the lead character in a mission to revive Mycroft Holmes, the computer who helped run the Lunar revolution.
