= A Robert Heinlein Omnibus =

First edition (publ. Sidgwick & Jackson)

A Robert Heinlein Omnibus was a second collection of Robert A Heinlein's stories to use the term "omnibus" the first being The Robert Heinlein Omnibus (1958), published in 1966. Containing fifteen of Heinlein's short stories and novellas, this second "Omnibus" represents a short chronological period, 1940 to 1950, of Heinlein's writings.

It contained some of Heinlein's more popular stories, as well as a few variations of later more popular stories. The editors were more than a little careless as it also contained two of the three stories included in the previous publication.

== Contents ==
- The Roads Must Roll (1940)
- Requiem (1940)
- The Man Who Sold the Moon (1950)
- "It's Great to Be Back!" (1947)
- The Green Hills of Earth (1947)
- Logic of Empire (1941)
- The Black Pits of Luna (1948)
- Delilah and the Space-Rigger (1949)
- Gentlemen, Be Seated! (1948)
- The Long Watch (1949)
- Ordeal in Space (1948)
- Space Jockey (1947)
- Preface (The Man Who Sold the Moon) (1950)
- Let There Be Light (1940)
- We Also Walk Dogs (1941)

== Overview ==
In these stories we can see some of the elements that go into Heinlein's later works. There is a willingness to look at society, humanity in a slightly askance manner, for example, Delilah and the Space Rigger argues for more gender equality, before the argument had grown in Europe, before spreading outwards to Britain and the US. Similarly, while only a "lowly secretary" in "We Also Walk Dogs", Grace Cormet, and scientist Mary Lou Martin in 'Let There Be Light', are very much role models for later, even more dynamic heroines like Helen Ripley. Heinlein's views on women taking a greater role in the workplace were expounded in "Delilah and the Space Rigger', with G.B McNye and the attitude of her immediate boss. Given the role of women in the few SF films and books of the decade after these stories were written, which was to stand around and scream a lot or make up numbers, Heinlein was clearly displaying his radicalism and an amazing foresight that is unmatched by any other writer in the genre. Heinlein's feminist credentials were tarnished by revisionist reviews of his later female characters, but this was still the same man who, during an Apollo mission, reduced Walter Cronkite to a spluttering mess when he suggested women should be trained as astronauts.

Heinlein also shows an influential and disturbing prescience in his story, "The Logic of Empire". It could be argued that the story is a variation on Richard Henry Dana Jr's Two Years Before the Mast with a space age twist on employment contracting. Gordon R. Dickson's Childe Cycle stories took the same idea further with "closed" and "open" contract systems applicable in the Dorsai universe. Like Dana, Heinlein's protagonist, Sam Houston Jones, is determined to prove that the Venus contracted employment system is no better than ensuring slavery for anyone foolish enough to accept such a contract. Jones is also trying to prove that ultimately, such strenuous contract systems are unworkable, the same point Dickson makes. Heinlein may not have foreseen it, but in some ways, this story is questioning the advantages of globalization, the drives that place economic matters before people.

In the end, it is personal taste that dictates individual acceptance, like or dislike, of any particular story. Heinlein writes about the things he knows, what he sees and takes them to a different level. All his stories have some point, something the reader can learn from, all the reader needs is to keep an open mind and listen to what a master has to say.
