= The Notebooks of Lazarus Long =

1978 book by Robert Heinlein

- Cover for The Notebooks of Lazarus Long
- Author: Robert A. Heinlein
- Language: English
- Genre: Science fiction
- Publisher: Ace Books
- Publication date: 1978
- Publication place: United States
- Media type: Paperback
- ISBN: 0399122427
- OCLC: 460182188

The Notebooks of Lazarus Long is a 1978 collection of aphorisms by Robert Heinlein's main character, "Lazarus Long", excerpted from his 1973 novel Time Enough for Love. The aphorisms were originally published as two "intermission" sections in the novel.

In the context of the novel, the quotes were selected from Long's much longer memoirs (which make up a significant portion of the novel). Some of the quotes are humorous or ironic, some philosophical, and some merely quirky. They range in length from one sentence to multiple paragraphs. For example:

Always store beer in a cold, dark place.

Cheops' Law: Nothing ever gets built on schedule or within budget.

Anyone who cannot cope with mathematics is not fully human. At best he is a tolerable subhuman who has learned to wear shoes, bathe, and not make messes in the house.

Rub her feet.

If the universe has any purpose more important than topping a woman you love and making a baby with her hearty help, I have never heard of it.

Never try to teach a pig to sing – it wastes your time and annoys the pig.

In 1978, these "notebooks" were published as a stand-alone work, with some quotes illuminated by D. F. Vassallo (similar to medieval scripture). More excerpts were published in 1988.
