= Time Enough for Love =

1973 science fiction novel by Robert A. Heinlein

- First edition cover (1973)
- Author: Robert A. Heinlein
- Cover artist: Vincent Di Fate
- Language: English
- Genre: Science fiction
- Publisher: G.P. Putnam's Sons
- Publication date: June 1973
- Publication place: United States
- Media type: Print (Hardback & Paperback)
- Pages: 605
- ISBN: 0-399-11151-4
- OCLC: 639653
- Dewey Decimal: 813/.5/4
- LC Class: PZ3.H364 Ti3 PS3515.E288
- Preceded by: I Will Fear No Evil
- Followed by: The Number of the Beast

Time Enough for Love is a science fiction novel by American writer Robert A. Heinlein, first published in 1973. The book made the shortlist for the Nebula, Hugo and Locus awards for best science fiction novel of that year, although it did not win. It did win a retrospective Libertarian Futurist Society award: the Prometheus Hall of Fame award of 1988.

== Plot ==
The book covers several periods from the life of Lazarus Long (born Woodrow Wilson Smith), an early beneficiary of a breeding experiment designed to increase mankind's natural lifespan. The experiment is known as the Howard Families, after the program's initiator. Lazarus is more the result of a mutation than the breeding experiment, and he is the oldest living human at more than two thousand years old.

The first half of the book takes the form of several novellas connected by Lazarus's retrospective narrative. In the framing story, Lazarus has decided that life is no longer worth living, but, in what is described as a reverse Arabian Nights scenario, agrees not to end his life for as long as his companion and descendant, chief executive of the Howard Families Ira Weatheral, will listen to his stories.

=== "The Tale of the Man Who Was Too Lazy to Fail" ===
This story concerns a 20th-century United States Navy seaman, midshipman, and officer David Lamb, who receives multiple promotions while minimizing any semblance of real work or combat by applying himself enthusiastically to the principle of "constructive laziness".

=== "The Tale of the Twins Who Weren't" ===
Lazarus tells of his visit as an interplanetary cargo trader to a planet, where he bought a pair of slaves, brother and sister, and immediately manumitted them. Because they had no knowledge of independent living or any education, Lazarus teaches them "how to be human" during the voyage.

The two were the result of an experiment in genetic recombination in which two parent cells were separated into complementary haploid gametes and recombined into two embryos. The resulting zygotes were implanted in a woman and gestated by her, with the result that although both have the same surrogate mother and genetic parents, they are no more closely related genetically than any two people taken at random. They have been prevented from sexual relations by a chastity belt. However, having confirmed that there is no risk of genetic disease in their offspring (described as the only valid argument against incest), Lazarus solemnizes their marriage and later establishes them as the owners and operators of a thriving business. At the end of the story, he reveals that the twins looked the same age decades later and expresses his belief that they were his own descendants, from an earlier time when he had been a slave on the same planet.

=== "The Tale of the Adopted Daughter" ===
A short scene-setter introduces a planet on which Lazarus has led a group of pioneering colonists.

Lazarus, now working as a banker and shopkeeper on the frontier planet and keeping his true age secret, saves a young girl, Dora, from a burning house and becomes her guardian. When she becomes an adult, he leaves the area but returns as a younger man and marries her, and the two move away to start a new settlement, where Lazarus' long life is less likely to be noticed. They eventually manage to build a thriving community. Because Dora is not a descendant of the Howard Families, the source of his longevity, she eventually dies of old age, leaving Lazarus to mourn.

=== "Boondock" ===
At the beginning of this story, Lazarus has regained his enthusiasm for life, and the remainder of the book is told in a conventional linear manner. Accompanied by some of his descendants, Lazarus has now moved to a new planet and established a polyamorous family, with three men, three women, and a larger number of children, two of whom are female clones of Lazarus.

=== "Da Capo" ===
In the concluding tale, Lazarus attempts to travel backward in time to 1919 to experience it as an adult, but an error in calculation places Lazarus in 1916, on the eve of America's involvement in World War I. An unintentional result is that Lazarus falls in love with his own mother. To retain her esteem and that of his grandfather, Lazarus enlists in the army. Eventually, before Lazarus leaves for the war, he and his mother, Maureen, consummate their mutual attraction, as his mother is already pregnant and so accepts that there is no collateral risk. (Note: The blurb of some editions (such as Ace Books ISBN 978-0-441-81076-5) states that Lazarus "became his own ancestor", but that is contradicted by the book, since his mother was already pregnant at the time of their encounter, and in any case, his younger self had already been born. Heinlein's later novel To Sail Beyond the Sunset, the memoirs of Lazarus' mother, also describes the events.)

In the trenches of the Western Front in France, he is mortally wounded, but is rescued at the last moment by his future companions from the framing story and returned to his own time.

=== The Notebooks of Lazarus Long ===
There are also two "Intermission" sections, each some six or eight pages long, taking the form of lists of provocative phrases and aphorisms not obviously related to the main narrative. They were later published independently, with illustrations, as The Notebooks of Lazarus Long.

== Themes ==
What ties most of the stories together is that they are an examination and deconstruction of incest. In the context of his "tales" Heinlein examines the morality of a variety of possible incestuous situations: from unrelated "twins", to unrelated parent-child, to distant relatives, and finally close relatives when Lazarus sleeps with his own mother. Heinlein seems to conclude that, absent genetic risk, it is not immoral at all.

== Connections to other stories ==
Early in the story, one of the characters presents Lazarus with a number of activities that may be new (to him), to entice him into remaining alive and being restored to youth. One of the suggestions is to have his memory and consciousness transplanted into a female clone of himself, at which point Lazarus briefly remembers hearing of the events that occurred in I Will Fear No Evil.

Later in the book, a character reports the fate of the generation ship Vanguard, from Heinlein's Orphans of the Sky: it was found derelict in space, but the survivors (descendants of the characters from Orphans) have adopted a hunter-gatherer lifestyle on another planet.

From Methuselah's Children, Lazarus offers to recount the fate of the Jockaira, but another character cuts him off, saying: "Since that lie is already in his memoirs in four conflicting versions, why should we be burdened with a fifth?" Long also reports the fate of the descendants of the Howards who chose to stay on the planet of the Little People. Some of the Little People alive at the time he returned to the planet harbored the memories of those Howards, including Mary Sperling; but Long's ship reports that "if there is a human artifact on the surface of that planet, it is less than a half meter in diameter".

Also, at one point reference is made to the burial in space of Andrew Jackson "Slipstick" Libby, co-creator of the Libby–Sheffield para-drive. Libby is the human calculator genius who first appears in the short story "Misfit". Lazarus had promised Libby to return him to his native Ozarks, which comforted Libby as he died. One hundred years later, Lazarus returns to the planet around which Libby's coffin should be in orbit, but cannot find it, despite having so equipped it that he should have. He later uses this as a "time travel calibration" check, and we find out what happened to Libby's coffin in The Number of the Beast.

Additionally, reference is made to Doctor Pinero, the primary character from Heinlein's short story "Life-Line"; during the novel's ending one of the characters tells Lazarus that he (Lazarus) cannot die, which aligns with the fact that Pinero (who could predict the exact time of anyone's death) was supposedly unable to foresee the time of Lazarus's demise.

The history of the Howard Families and Lazarus Long also feature prominently in The Cat Who Walks Through Walls and To Sail Beyond the Sunset.

== Reception ==
John Leonard, writing in The New York Times, praised Time Enough for Love as "a great entertainment", declaring that "it doesn't matter [that] all his characters sound and behave exactly the same; it's because the man is a master of beguilement. He pulls so hard of the dugs of sentiment that disbelief is not merely suspended; it is abolished".

Theodore Sturgeon reviewed the novel favorably, citing "the fascination of watching the mind of a man whose reach always exceeds his grasp but who will never stop reaching".

== Editions ==
- 1973, Ace, hardcover, ISBN 0-7394-1944-7
- June 1, 1973, Putnam Pub Group, hardcover, 605 pages, ISBN 0-399-11151-4
- 1974, Berkley Medallion Books, paperback, ISBN 0-425-02493-8
- December 1976, Berkley Publishing Group, paperback, ISBN 0-425-03471-2
- October 1978, Berkley Publishing Group, paperback, ISBN 0-425-04373-8
- March 1980, Berkley Publishing Group, paperback, ISBN 0-425-04684-2
- December 15, 1981, Berkley, paperback, ISBN 0-425-05490-X
- December 1982, Berkley Publishing Group, paperback, ISBN 0-425-06126-4
- November 1983, Berkley Publishing Group, paperback, ISBN 0-425-07050-6
- September 1984, Berkley Publishing Group, paperback, ISBN 0-425-07990-2
- November 1986, Berkley Publishing Group, paperback, ISBN 0-425-10224-6
- November 1, 1988, Ace Books, paperback reissue edition, xvii+589 pages, ISBN 0-441-81076-4
- November 1994, Ace Books, ISBN 99948-63-95-9
- January 1, 2000, Blackstone Audiobooks, cassette audiobook, ISBN 0-7861-1876-8
- January 1, 2000, Blackstone Audiobooks, cassette audiobook, ISBN 0-7861-1894-6
- December 1, 2004, Blackstone Audiobooks, ISBN 0-7861-8961-4
