= The Rolling Stones (novel) =

1952 science fiction novel by Robert A. Heinlein

- First edition cover
- Author: Robert A. Heinlein
- Cover artist: Clifford Geary
- Language: English
- Series: Heinlein juveniles
- Genre: Science fiction
- Publisher: Charles Scribner's Sons
- Publication date: 1952
- Publication place: United States
- Media type: Print (hardback & paperback)
- Preceded by: Between Planets
- Followed by: Starman Jones

The Rolling Stones (also published under the name Space Family Stone in the United Kingdom) is a 1952 science fiction novel by American writer Robert A. Heinlein.

A condensed version of the novel had been published earlier in Boys' Life (September, October, November, December 1952) under the title "Tramp Space Ship". It was published in hardcover that year by Scribner's as part of the Heinlein juveniles.

== Plot summary ==
The Stones, a family of "Loonies" (residents of the Moon), purchase and restore a used spaceship and go sightseeing around the Solar System.

The twin teenage boys, named Castor and Pollux after the half-brothers of classical legend, buy used bicycles to sell on Mars, their first stop, where they run afoul of local regulations, but their grandmother Hazel Stone saves them from jail. While on Mars, the twins buy their brother Buster a native Martian creature called a flat cat, which produces a soothing vibration, as a pet.

Instead of returning home as originally planned, they decide to travel to the asteroid belt, where the equivalent of a gold rush is in progress, prospecting for "core material" and radioactive ores. The twins obtain supplies and luxury goods on Mars to sell at their destination, on the principle that it is shopkeepers, not miners, who get rich during gold rushes. En route, the rapidly maturing, fertile (and pregnant) flat cat and its offspring quickly cause a population explosion aboard, so the family places them in hibernation and later sells them to the miners.

After an adventure or two, the family sets out to see the rings of Saturn.

=== Flat cat ===
In the novel, flat cats are a species of Martian animal which reproduce rapidly and overrun a spaceship. In the chapter "Free Enterprise", the character Mr. Angelo, a shopkeeper on Mars, introduces Castor and Pollux Stone to a flat cat:

Angelo tickled it with a forefinger; it began to purr like a high-pitched buzzer. It had no discernible features, being merely a pie-shaped mass of sleek red fur a little darker than Castor's own hair. "They're affectionate little things and many of the sand rats keep them for pets - a man has to have someone to talk to when he's out prospecting and a flat cat is better than a wife because it can't talk back. It just purrs and snuggles up to you."

The boys take the flat cat onto the family space ship, where it soon has eight "kittens", each of which soon gives birth again, until the ship is overwhelmed with flat cats. The family solves the problem by rounding up the flat cats and putting them into the storage hold at low temperature, where they hibernate. They are later revived and sold to miners in the asteroid belt.

== Research ==
As with his other novels, Heinlein and his wife Virginia "spent countless hours in research, fiercely dedicated to getting it right for their readers."

== Influences ==
Heinlein credited the 1905 Ellis Parker Butler short story "Pigs Is Pigs" with inspiring the flat cat incident.

=== Flat cats v. tribbles ===
A similar concept and plotline appeared later in the Star Trek episode "The Trouble with Tribbles". According to screenwriter David Gerrold, the show's producers noticed similarities in the two stories and asked Heinlein for permission to use the idea. Heinlein asked for an autographed copy of the script, but otherwise did not object, noting that both stories owed something to the 1905 Ellis Parker Butler story "Pigs Is Pigs" -- "and possibly to Noah".

The similarities to the flat cats and some specific story events involving them was brought to the attention of the Star Trek staff when Desilu/Paramount's primary in-house clearance group, Kellam de Forest Research, submitted a report on the script on August 11, 1967, noting the similarities of "a small, featureless, fluffy, purring animal, friendly and loving, that reproduces rapidly when fed, and nearly engulfs a spaceship". So worrisome was this matter that the producers contacted Heinlein and asked for a waiver, which Heinlein granted. In his authorized biography, Heinlein said he was called by producer Gene Coon about the issue and agreed to waive claim to the "similarity" to his flat cats because he’d just been through one plagiarism lawsuit and did not wish to embroil himself in another. He had misgivings upon seeing the actual script but let it go, an action he later regretted:

If that matter had simply been dropped after that one episode was filmed, I would have chalked it up wryly to experience. But the 'nice kid' did not drop it; 'tribbles' (i.e. my 'flat cats') have been exploited endlessly… Well that’s one that did 'larn me.' Today if J. Christ phoned me on some matter of business, I would simply tell him: 'See my agent.'

Heinlein freely acknowledged that he took some inspiration from the Butler story, but was careful not to plagiarize him, and the similarities are primarily that the creatures reproduce rapidly and overrun a place. Conversely, the tribbles copy not only the flat cats' general appearance, behavior, the effects of their purring on people, and the particulars of their reproduction when fed and unfed—but that they are obtained from a merchant who does not warn customers of their dangers, and ultimately unloaded from the ship onto another unsuspecting party.

The screenwriter of the episode, David Gerrold, admits that he had read the Heinlein book years before writing his screenplay but claims he was not consciously aware of the similarities until the Kellam de Forest report. According to him, Heinlein asked only for an autographed copy of the script and, in a note to Gerrold, "Let me add that I felt that the analogy to my flat cats was mild enough to be of no importance".

== Connections to other Heinlein works ==
In Chapter XIII ("Caveat Vendor"), Hazel Stone tells the judge, "I am a stranger here in a strange land" (paraphrasing Exodus 2:22). Heinlein later used the same Biblical quote as the title of his Hugo-award winning novel of 1961.

The book makes several references to Hazel as an influential figure in founding the Lunar colony. Fourteen years later, Heinlein published The Moon Is a Harsh Mistress, which tells the story of the Lunar revolution, including a small but vital role that Hazel Stone played as a child (no specifics of this role are mentioned in The Rolling Stones; she is portrayed here simply as a "founding Father"). Hazel, Castor, and Pollux reappear in Number of the Beast and The Cat Who Walks Through Walls. Hazel, alone, appears in To Sail Beyond the Sunset.

Dr. Lowell Stone ("Buster") is quoted in a chapter heading in The Cat Who Walks Through Walls and referenced as Chief Surgeon at Ceres General. In that same book, Hazel states that Roger and Edith are now living in the extrasolar colony known as Fiddler's Green (itself first named in Friday).

The general description of the Martian met by Lowell is similar to the description of the Martians depicted in Red Planet and later in Stranger in a Strange Land.

== Reception ==
Jo Walton writes that as a teenager, she considered the book one of the weakest of the Heinlein juveniles; upon rereading it as an adult, it "leaves me feeling I can't get no satisfaction" (a reference to a song by The Rolling Stones). Both Walton and James Nicoll criticize the book's sexual politics, with Nicoll specifically stating that "(t)he [book's] sexual politics are tragic." Heinlein himself wrote, in a letter to his agent after he had finished the first quarter of the book, that it had "an unsatisfactory story line thereafter," and that he found a "domestic comedy" "harder to write" than "revolutions and blood."

Groff Conklin described the novel as "a thoroughly delightful job". Boucher and McComas praised it as "easily the most plausible, carefully detailed picture of an interplanetary future we will encounter in any year". P. Schuyler Miller cited the novel's "freshness and simplicity," characterizing it as "a life-size portrait-gallery of real people living in a real world of the future, every detail of which fits into place with top-tolerance precision".

Surveying Heinlein's juvenile novels, Jack Williamson characterized Heinlein's story as "a dream of personal freedom" written with "an enviable craftsmanship", noted that the novel "carries its thematic burden tightly", unlike Heinlein's later adult novels, and praised The Rolling Stones for its "sense of an accurately extrapolated future background, with all of the new technologies given an air of commonplace reality".
