= Methuselah's Children =

1958 SF novel by Robert A. Heinlein

- First edition cover
- Author: Robert A. Heinlein
- Cover artist: Lionel Dillon
- Language: English
- Series: Future History
- Genre: Science fiction
- Publisher: Gnome Press
- Publication date: 1958
- Publication place: United States
- Media type: Print (hardback & paperback)
- Pages: 188
- ISBN: 0-451-09083-7
- Preceded by: "Misfit"
- Followed by: Orphans of the Sky

Methuselah's Children is a science fiction novel by American writer Robert A. Heinlein. Originally serialized in Astounding Science Fiction in the July, August, and September 1941 issues, it was expanded into a full-length novel in 1958. The novel is part of Heinlein's Future History series of stories. It introduces the Howard families, a fictional group of people who achieved long lifespans through selective breeding.

According to John W. Campbell, the novel was originally to be called While the Evil Days Come Not, a quotation from Ecclesiastes used as a password on the second page of the story.

== Plot summary ==
Starting off a grocer, Ira Howard became rich as a sutler wholesaler during the American Civil War, but died of old age at 48 or 49 years old. The trustees of his will carried out his wishes to prolong human life by financially encouraging those with long-lived grandparents to marry each other and have children. By the 22nd century, the "Howard families" have a life expectancy exceeding 150 years and keep their existence secret with the "Masquerade" in which the members fake their deaths and obtain new identities.

The Masquerade helped the Families survive the dictatorship of Nehemiah Scudder, but as an experiment, some Howard members reveal themselves to The Covenant, hoping that the free society established after Scudder's defeat will be friendly. They are mistaken; others refuse to believe that the Families obtained their lifespan by selective breeding, insisting that they have developed a secret method to extend life. Administrator Slayton Ford, leader of Earth, believes that the Families are telling the truth, but cannot prevent efforts to force Howard members to reveal their alleged rejuvenation treatments.

Lazarus Long, the eldest member of the Families, proposes that the Families hijack the colony starship New Frontiers to escape Earth. Using an inertialess drive invented by Howard member Andrew Jackson "Slipstick" Libby, the Families leave the Solar System with the deposed Ford. The first planet they discover has humanoid inhabitants domesticated by undescribed godlike natives. When Earthly humans prove resistant to similar domestication, they are expelled from the planet.

The second planet is a lush environment with no predators and mild weather. Its inhabitants, the “Little People”, are part of a group mind, with the mental ability to manipulate the environment on the genetic and molecular level, but do not distinguish between individuals. That becomes evident when Mary Sperling, the second oldest member of the Families, joins the group mind to become immortal. The Families are further horrified when the group mind genetically modifies the first baby born on the planet into a new, alien form. A majority of the Families want to return to Earth to demand their freedom; Libby, with the help of the group mind, builds a new faster-than-light drive to take them home in months instead of years.

The Families, returning to the Solar System 74 years after their original departure because of time dilation, discover that Earth's scientists have artificially extended human lifespan indefinitely by replicating what they believe is the Families' secret. The Howard members are now welcomed for their discovery of faster-than-light travel. Libby and Long decide to recruit other members of the Families and explore space with the new drive.

== Critical reception ==
Alva Rogers, in A Requiem for Astounding, wrote that Methuselah's Children was "Full of adventure, conflict, romance, and enough casually tossed-off ideas to serve as the basis for a half-dozen other stories."

In Heinlein in Dimension, Alexei Panshin wrote, "In many ways this is an important book. For one, its main theme, the problem of escaping death, is one that keeps cropping up in Heinlein stories, and for another, an amazing number of brilliant ideas are tossed out along the way." Floyd C. Gale called the book "a classic".

== Reappearance of characters in other Heinlein novels ==
Lazarus Long first appears in this novel. Other Heinlein novels featuring him include Time Enough for Love, The Number of the Beast, The Cat Who Walks Through Walls and To Sail Beyond the Sunset. Andrew "Slipstick" Libby, previously seen as a young adult in the short story "Misfit", also features prominently in this novel. In Time Enough for Love, Libby is said to have become Lazarus Long's partner in space travel until his death.

== Awards ==
- Prometheus Hall of Fame Award for "Best Classic Libertarian Sci-Fi Novel" (1997)

== See also ==
- 1958 in science fiction
