= The Robert Heinlein Omnibus =

Anthology of science fiction

First edition, published by Science Fiction Book Club. Cover art by C. W. Bacon.

The Robert Heinlein Omnibus is an anthology of science fiction published in 1958, containing a novel, a novella and a short story by American writer Robert A. Heinlein:

- Beyond This Horizon (1942)
- The Man Who Sold The Moon (1950)
- The Green Hills of Earth (1947)
