= Misfit (short story) =

1939 short story by Robert A. Heinlein

- Short story by Robert A. Heinlein
- Country: United States
- Language: English
- Genre: Science fiction

Publication
- Published in: Astounding Science Fiction
- Publication type: Magazine
- Media type: Print
- Publication date: November 1939
- Series: Future History

"Misfit" is a science fiction short story by American writer Robert A. Heinlein. It was originally titled "Cosmic Construction Corps" before being renamed by the editor John W. Campbell and published in the November 1939 issue of Astounding Science Fiction. "Misfit" was Heinlein's second published story. One of the earliest of Heinlein's Future History stories, it was later included in the collections Revolt in 2100 and The Past Through Tomorrow.

== Plot summary ==
A coming-of-age story that follows Andrew Jackson Libby, a boy from Earth with extraordinary mathematical ability but meager education. Finding few opportunities on Earth, he joins the Cosmic Construction Corps, a future military-led version of the US Depression-era Civilian Conservation Corps employing out-of-work youth to construct the infrastructure needed to colonize the Solar System. With a group of other inexperienced young men he is assigned to a ship traveling to the asteroid belt, where their task is to build a base on an asteroid and then move it into a more convenient orbit between Earth and Mars. Libby comes to the Captain's attention during the process of blasting holes in the asteroid for rocket engines when Libby realizes that a mistake has been made in calculating the size of the charge, preventing a catastrophic blast. He is assigned to the ship's astrogation computer. During the move to the destination orbit, the computer malfunctions, and Libby takes over, performing all the complex calculations in his head. The asteroid is settled successfully into its final orbit.

"Slipstick" Libby became one of Heinlein's recurring characters and would later appear in several works associated with Lazarus Long, among them Methuselah's Children and The Cat Who Walks Through Walls.

The story includes one of the earliest uses of the term "space marines".
