= The Cat Who Walks Through Walls =

1985 science fiction novel by Robert A. Heinlein

- Author: Robert A. Heinlein
- Cover artist: Michael Whelan
- Language: English
- Genre: Science fiction
- Publisher: Putnam Publishing Group
- Publication date: 1985
- Publication place: United States
- Media type: Print (Paperback)
- ISBN: 0-399-13103-5
- OCLC: 82423089
- Dewey Decimal: 813.54 19
- LC Class: PS3515.E288 C3 1985
- Followed by: To Sail Beyond the Sunset

The Cat Who Walks Through Walls is a science fiction novel by American writer Robert A. Heinlein, published in 1985. Like many of his later novels, it features Lazarus Long and Jubal Harshaw as supporting characters.

== Plot summary ==
A writer seated at the best restaurant of the space habitat "Golden Rule" is approached by a man who urges him that "Tolliver must die" and is himself shot before the writer's eyes. The writer—Colonel Colin Campbell, living under a number of aliases including his pen name "Richard Ames"—is joined by a beautiful and sophisticated lady, Gwendolyn Novak, who helps him flee to Luna with a bonsai maple and a would-be murderer ("Bill"). After escaping to the Moon, Gwen claims to have been present during the revolt described in The Moon Is a Harsh Mistress.

Still pursued by assassins, Campbell and Novak are rescued by an organization known as the Time Corps under the leadership of Lazarus Long. After giving Campbell a new foot to replace one lost in combat years before, the Time Corps attempts to recruit Campbell for a special mission. Accepting only on Gwen's account, Campbell agrees to assist a team to retrieve the decommissioned Mike, a sentient computer introduced in The Moon Is a Harsh Mistress. Engaged in frequent time-travel, the Time Corps has been responsible for changing various events in the past, creating an alternate universe with every time-line they disrupt. Mike's assistance is needed in order to accurately predict the conditions and following events in each of the new universes created. Campbell's frequent would-be assassins are revealed to be members of contemporary agencies also engaged in time manipulation who, for unknown reasons, do not want to see Mike rescued by the Time Corps.

During the mission, Gwen is grievously wounded and Campbell loses his foot again, though the Time Corps succeed in retrieving Mike. The story ends with Campbell talking into a recorder (presumably the source of the first-person narrative) reflecting on the mission and his relationship with Gwen.

== Background ==
The Cat Who Walks Through Walls may be regarded as part of Heinlein's multiverse series, or as a sequel to both The Number of the Beast and The Moon Is a Harsh Mistress. During a meeting of the Council of the Time Scouts, representatives from every major time line and setting written by Heinlein appear, including Glory Road and Starship Troopers, and references are made to other authors' works as well.

The title of the book refers to a cat by the name of Pixel, who has an inexplicable tendency to be wherever the narrator happens to be (see Schrödinger's cat). In one scene Pixel does, in fact, walk through a wall, and it is explained that Pixel is too young to know that such behavior is impossible.

== Connections to other Heinlein works ==
Gwen Novak is eventually revealed to be Hazel Stone, a character previously featured in Heinlein's The Rolling Stones and who had played a small but important role in The Moon Is a Harsh Mistress. Campbell is also eventually revealed to be a son of Lazarus Long, a Heinlein character originally introduced in Methuselah's Children and who reappeared in Time Enough for Love, The Number of the Beast, and To Sail Beyond the Sunset. Also appearing are Jubal Harshaw, a major character in Stranger in a Strange Land; Galahad, of Time Enough for Love; and Manuel Garcia O'Kelly Davis, the first-person protagonist of The Moon Is a Harsh Mistress.

== Reception ==
Dave Langford reviewed The Cat Who Walks Through Walls for White Dwarf #76, and stated that "I'm afraid it's Heinlein self-indulgence time again. What's on the menu is those blasted inter-universal travellers from Number of the Beast, plus walk-ons from Time Enough for Love, Glory Road, The Moon is a Harsh Mistress, Stranger in a Strange Land and more."

Wendy Graham reviewed The Cat Who Walks Through Walls for Adventurer magazine and stated that "About the only thing I liked about the second half was the cat, Pixel, of the title. I would suspect that Robert Heinlein, Patrick Moore and I have one thing in common — we have all been adopted by a cat (they do that you know!) And I like my books to have endings."
