= The Door into Summer =

1956 SF novel by Robert A. Heinlein

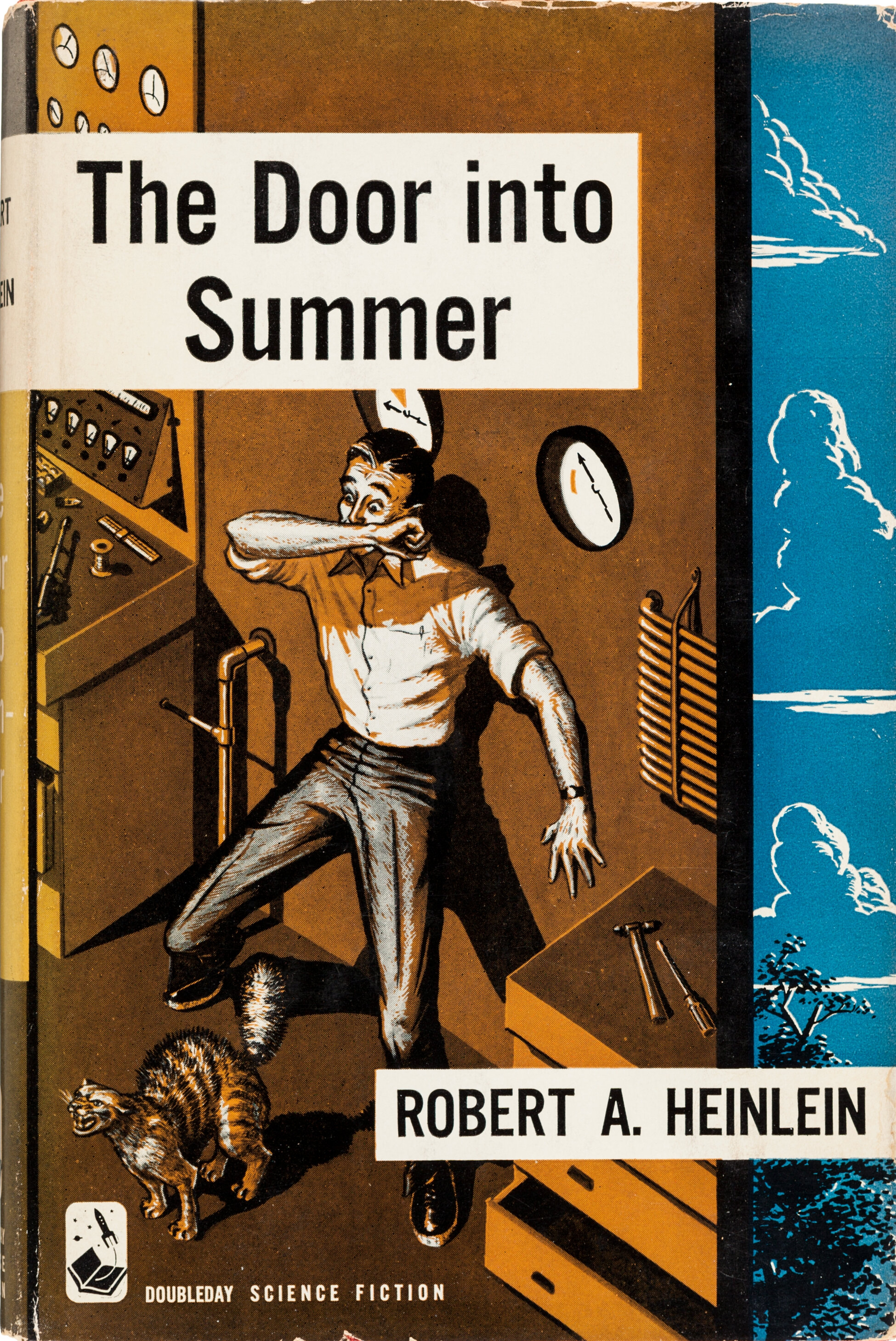
- First edition cover
- Author: Robert A. Heinlein
- Cover artist: Mel Hunter
- Language: English
- Genre: Science fiction
- Publisher: Doubleday
- Publication date: Serial version 1956; hardcover 1957
- Publication place: United States
- Media type: Print (hardcover and paperback)
- ISBN: 0-330-02516-3
- OCLC: 16365175

The Door into Summer is a science fiction novel by American science fiction writer Robert A. Heinlein, originally serialized in The Magazine of Fantasy & Science Fiction (October, November, December 1956, with covers and interior illustrations by Kelly Freas). It was published in hardcover in 1957.

== Conception ==
The idea for the novel came from an incident outlined by Heinlein later:

When we were living in Colorado there was snowfall. Our cat—I'm a cat man—wanted to get out of the house so I opened a door for him but he wouldn't leave. Just kept on crying. He'd seen snow before and I couldn't understand it. I kept opening other doors for him and he still wouldn't leave. Then Ginny said, "Oh, he's looking for a door into summer." I threw up my hands, told her not to say another word, and wrote the novel The Door into Summer in 13 days.

== Plot ==
The novel opens in 1970 with Daniel Boone Davis, an engineer and inventor, well into a long drinking binge. He has lost his company, Hired Girl, Inc., to his partner Miles Gentry and the company bookkeeper, Belle Darkin. Darkin had been Dan's fiancée, deceiving him into giving her enough voting stock to allow her and Miles to seize control. Dan's only friend in the world is his cat, "Pete" (short for Petronius the Arbiter), a feisty tomcat who hates going outdoors in the snow.

Hired Girl, Inc. manufactures robot vacuum cleaners, but Dan had been developing a new line of all-purpose household robots, Flexible Frank, when Miles announces his intention to sell the company (and Flexible Frank) to Mannix Enterprises in which Miles would become a vice president. Wishing to stay independent, Dan opposes the takeover, but is outvoted and then fired as Chief Engineer. Left with a large financial settlement, and his remaining Hired Girl stock, he elects to take "cold sleep" (suspended animation), hoping to wake up thirty years later to a brighter future. The examining doctor at the cold sleep facility immediately sees that Dan has been drinking. He warns him to show up sober or not at all 24 hours later for the actual procedure.

After becoming sober, Dan decides instead to mount a counter-attack. First he mails his Hired Girl stock certificate to the one person he trusts, Miles' stepdaughter Frederica "Ricky" Virginia Gentry. Dan confronts Miles and finds Belle in Miles' home. Belle injects him with an illegal "zombie" drug, reducing him to somnolent compliance. Belle and Miles discover Dan's plans to go into cold sleep and have him committed to a different repository run by one of Belle's shady associates for the Mannix corporation.

Dan wakes up in the year 2000 with no money to his name and no idea how to find the people he once knew. What little money Belle let him keep went with the collapse of Mannix in 1987. He has lost Pete the cat, who fled Miles' house after Dan was drugged, and has no idea how to find a now middle-aged Ricky.

Dan begins rebuilding his life. He persuades Geary Manufacturing, which now owns Hired Girl, to take him on as a figurehead. He discovers that Miles died in 1972, while Belle has become a shrill, gin-sodden wreck. All she recalls is that Ricky went to live with her grandmother about the time Dan went into cold sleep. Her scheme with Miles collapsed, as the Flexible Frank prototype disappeared the same night she tricked Dan.

Dan finds Flexible Frank in use everywhere, filling many menial jobs once filled by people. It is called "Eager Beaver", made by a company called "Aladdin Auto-engineering." Dan can see that someone has taken his prototype and developed it. He is even more baffled to find that the patent is credited to a "D.B. Davis".

His friend Chuck at Geary lets slip that he once saw time travel working, in a lab in Colorado. At that point Dan finds that Ricky has been awakened from cold sleep and left Los Angeles for Brawley, California. Dan tracks her to Yuma, Arizona, where she was apparently married. When Dan looks at the marriage register, he finds that she married "Daniel Boone Davis". He immediately empties his bank account and heads for Colorado.

In Boulder, he befriends Dr. Twitchell, a once-brilliant scientist reduced to drinking away his frustrations. Eventually, Twitchell admits to having created a time machine of sorts. With the machine powered up, Dan goads Twitchell into sending him back to 1970, some months before his confrontation with Miles and Belle. He materializes in a Denver naturist retreat in front of a couple, John and Jenny Sutton, whom he befriends. The husband, a lawyer by trade, helps Dan cash in the gold he has brought back with him. In the future gold is no longer a coinage metal and costs a fraction of its value in 1970.

Working rapidly, Dan creates "Drafting Dan", an automated drafting machine, which he then uses to design "Protean Pete", the first version of Eager Beaver. He sets up a new corporation with the Suttons called "Aladdin Auto-engineering", returns to Los Angeles, and stakes out Miles' house on the fateful night. Watching himself arrive, he lets events unfold until Pete the cat emerges, then takes his own car and uses it to remove Flexible Frank and all his engineering drawings from Miles' garage.

Destroying the drawings and scattering machine parts across the landscape, he and Pete head out to meet Ricky at her Girl Scout summer camp. Dan assigns his stock in Hired Girl to Ricky and suggests that she take cold sleep when she is 21 so they can meet again. Ricky asks Dan if he will marry her after their cold sleep and Dan agrees. Dan returns to Los Angeles to use his original appointment for cold sleep, pleading that he lost the original paperwork.

With Pete in his arms, he sleeps for the second time until 2001. He greets Ricky, now twenty-one, when she awakes. They leave for Brawley to retrieve her possessions from storage, and then are married in Yuma. Setting himself up as an independent inventor, he uses Ricky's Hired Girl stock to make changes at Geary, settling back to watch the healthy competition with Aladdin.

== Major themes ==
Some of Heinlein's stories, such as "'—All You Zombies—'" and "By His Bootstraps", feature time travel in which the protagonist re-creates himself using a time-travel paradox. This novel follows a similar theme, although the paradox is not central to the story. The idea recurs in the 1964 novel Farnham's Freehold, which hurls its protagonists into the future and then returns them to their own time, where they alter their destiny.

The novel is also post-apocalyptic, in that it takes place after a nuclear armed conflict. The United States was the clear victor, thanks to technologies that include the "cold sleep", which was used to maintain a large standing army that could be revived quickly and put into the field. The "zombie drug" used was a by-product of interrogation techniques. In the future time, "zombie recruiters" are apparently active, suggesting that the drug is widely used to recruit a form of slave labor.

It is mentioned that Washington, D.C., was destroyed, with the capital moved to Denver, Colorado, and there were also some hits on the East Coast and in Texas. However, the book in effect makes light of it. The United States rapidly recovers, refugees from devastated areas move to unharmed places, especially California, and the nuclear war leaves no lasting trauma. The 1984 book Warday by Whitley Strieber and James Kunetka takes up a limited nuclear attack in precisely the locations mentioned in Heinlein's book and depicts how hugely destructive it could be.

The early Heinlein biographer and critic Alexei Panshin, in his 1968 biography Heinlein in Dimension, took note of a controversial theme: "The romantic situation in this story is a very interesting, very odd one: it is nothing less than a mutual sexual interest between an engineer of thirty and a girl of twelve ('adorable' is Heinlein's word for her), that culminates in marriage after some hop-scotching around in time to adjust their ages a bit."

== Characters ==
- Daniel Boone Davis, reflecting much of the author's own character. An engineer and inventor, he is a fierce individualist. The only friends he has in the world are his cat Pete and young Ricky, wise beyond her years.
- Miles Gentry, Dan's former Army buddy and business partner, handling the financial and legal side.
- Belle S. Darkin, who presents herself to Miles and Dan when they most need help with the company. She is apparently a brilliant secretary, bookkeeper and office manager who is willing to work for a pittance. In reality she is an accomplished fraud artist with an extensive criminal record, several aliases, and a number of previous marriages which were never dissolved. She seduces first Dan, then Miles.
- Frederica Virginia "Ricky" Heinicke, physically an 11-year-old girl but emotionally almost adult. Like all Heinlein's heroines from this period, she is an intelligent redhead, and clearly modeled on Virginia Heinlein, even having a version of her name and her childhood nickname, Rikki-Tikki-Tavi.
- Petronius the Arbiter, or Pete, Dan's cat. Highly vocal with a wide range of expressive sounds, he acts as a sounding board for Dan's ruminations and fulminations. He goes everywhere with Dan, carried around in an overnight bag, emerging when Dan orders him a ginger ale in a bar, or buys him food at drive-in restaurants.
- Chuck Freudenberg, Dan's "beer buddy" and best friend at Geary Manufacturing.
- Dr. Hubert Twitchell, a brilliant physicist at the University of Colorado Boulder, who invents time travel while studying anti-gravity, only to see his work declared top secret by an armchair colonel looking for promotion to general, robbing Twitchell of a Nobel Prize.
- John and Jenny Sutton, a couple in their 30s who see Dan appear suddenly in their naturist club in 1970. Being tolerant, level-headed people, they help Dan in his mission. John is a lawyer and takes care of the legal angles.

== Reception ==
The novel "worried and bothered" John W. Campbell, who said "Bob can write a better story, with one hand tied behind him, than most people in the field can do with both hands. But Jesus, I wish that son of a gun would take that other hand out of his pocket."

Science fiction writer and critic James Blish, writing in 1957, shortly after publication, criticized the lack of characterization of its hero Dan Davis, saying, "It is surely an odd novel that is at its best when the author is openly editorializing ..." — in this case about the "parity system of farm price supports, which in 2000 is applied to automobiles. ... Every other important subject of science fiction which Heinlein has examined at length has come out remade, vitalized and made the author's own property. It didn't happen here, for the first time in Heinlein's long and distinguished career — and not because Heinlein didn't have something to say, but because he failed to embody it in a real protagonist. Evidently, Heinlein as his own hero is about played out." Floyd C. Gale was more positive in his 1957 review, comparing the book to The Sleeper Awakes and writing that "Heinlein paints a detailed picture of both civilizations, so evocative that 1970 emerges clearly in the reader's mind as the old days, and pretty primitive at that ... Of course you'll like Heinlein's latest". The critic Alexei Panshin, writing in 1968, said that "as a whole, the story is thoroughly melodramatic but very good fun. ... It was as though Heinlein the engineer said, 'If I had the parts available, what little gadgets would I most enjoy building?' and then went ahead and built them fictionally. A good story." After criticizing unrealistic science fiction, Carl Sagan in 1978 listed The Door Into Summer as among stories "that are so tautly constructed, so rich in the accommodating details of an unfamiliar society that they sweep me along before I have even a chance to be critical".

In three Locus magazine readers' polls from 1975 to 1998, it was judged the 36th, 29th, and the 43rd all-time best science-fiction novel.

In 2019, James Nicoll described it as "an evergreen novel in the sense that it somehow manages to be even more problematic every time I reread it", and noted that a major component of the plot is "middle aged man grooming a tween"; Nicoll did, however, concede that "[Heinlein] gets the future wrong but does so entertainingly. Some of his robot and gadget ideas are interesting."

== Adaptations ==
CREDEUS Inc. adapted the novel into the feature film 夏への扉 キミのいる未来へ (The Door into Summer), which was directed by Takahiro Miki and released on February 19, 2021. It closely follows the original plot, with the setting changed from the United States in 1970 and 2000 to Japan in 1995 and 2025.

== In popular culture ==
In 1967, the American rock group The Monkees recorded the song "The Door into Summer" for their album Pisces, Aquarius, Capricorn & Jones Ltd. The song was written by Chip Douglas and Bill Martin and performed by Michael Nesmith (lead vocals) and Micky Dolenz (back-up vocals). In a livestream interview in 2020, Nesmith directly attributes the inspiration for the song to the story about Heinlein's cat looking for the "Door into Summer". The song is about longing and regret for a life based primarily on the accumulation of material things. Other than the title, the song has little to do with the story told in the novel.

== General and cited sources ==
- More Issues at Hand, by James Blish, writing as William Atheling, Jr., Chicago: Advent:Publishers, Inc., 1970
- Heinlein in Dimension, by Alexei Panshin, Chicago: Advent:Publishers, Inc., 1968
