= Farnham's Freehold =

1964 SF novel by Robert A. Heinlein

- First edition cover
- Author: Robert A. Heinlein
- Cover artist: Irv Docktor
- Language: English
- Genre: Science fiction
- Publisher: G. P. Putnam (US)
- Publication date: 1964
- Publication place: United States
- Media type: Print (Hardcover & Paperback)

Farnham's Freehold is a science fiction novel by American writer Robert A. Heinlein. A serialized version, edited by Frederik Pohl, appeared in Worlds of If magazine (July, August, and October 1964). The complete version was published in novel form by G. P. Putnam later in 1964.

Farnham's Freehold is a post-apocalyptic story. The setup is a direct hit by a nuclear weapon, catapulting a nuclear shelter containing Farnham, his wife, son, daughter, daughter's friend, and employee (Joseph) into the future. While writing the story, Heinlein drew on his experience of building a fallout shelter under his home in Colorado Springs, Colorado in the 1960s.

== Plot ==
Hugh Farnham, a white middle-aged man, holds a bridge club party for his alcoholic wife Grace, law-graduate son Duke, college-student daughter Karen, and Karen's friend Barbara. During the bridge game, Duke berates Hugh for frightening Grace by preparing for a possible Soviet nuclear attack. When the attack actually occurs the group, along with Joe, the family's black servant, retreat to the fallout shelter beneath the house.

After several distant nuclear explosions rock the shelter, Hugh and Barbara become sexually intimate, after which the largest explosion of all hits the shelter. With only minor injuries, but with their bottled oxygen running low, the group decides to ensure that they will be able to leave the shelter when necessary. After exiting through an emergency tunnel, they find themselves in a completely undamaged, semi-tropical region apparently uninhabited by humans or other sentient creatures. Several of the group speculate that the final explosion somehow forced them into an alternate dimension.

The group struggles to stay alive by reverting to the ways of the American pioneers, with Hugh as the leader—despite friction between Hugh and Duke. Karen announces that she is pregnant and had returned home the night of the attack to tell her parents. Barbara also announces that she is pregnant, but without mentioning that her pregnancy resulted from her sexual encounter with Hugh during the attack. Karen eventually dies during her labor, due to complications, along with her infant daughter the next day.

Grace, whose sanity has been challenged by all these events, demands that Barbara be forced from the group or she will leave. Duke convinces Hugh that he will go with Grace to ensure her safety, but before they can leave, a large aircraft appears overhead. The group is taken captive by blacks, but is spared execution when Joe intervenes by conversation with their captors' leader in French.

The group finds that it has not been transported to another world, but instead is in the distant future of their own world. A decadent but technologically advanced black culture keeps either uneducated or castrated white people as slaves. Sexual slavery and cannibalism are widespread and generally accepted. Adolescent girls are sexually exploited as "bedwarmers" by their owners. Other children are bred on ranches for consumption and slaughtered during puberty (when their flesh is considered particularly tasty) or sometimes earlier.

Each of the characters adapts to the cultural changes in their own ways: Joe joins the dominant black culture, Grace becomes a willing "bedwarmer" to their owner, and Duke is castrated. All get used to eating human flesh, though at least Hugh and Barbara do so only unknowingly. When Hugh discovers frozen child carcasses in the storage room next to other meats and realizes that they are routinely cooked for their meals, he decides that he cannot live in this society. Together with Barbara, he attempts to escape, but they are captured. Rather than execute them, Ponse, "Lord Protector" of their household, asks them to volunteer for a time-travel experiment that will send them and their babies back to their own time.

They return just prior to the original nuclear attack, and flee in Barbara's car. As they drive they realize that while Barbara had driven a car with an automatic transmission, this car—the same car in every other respect—has a manual transmission, and Farnham deduces that the time-travel experiment worked but sent them into an alternate universe.

They gather supplies and flee into the hills, survive the attack, and live out the rest of their lives, trying to help rebuild a better America so that the dystopian future they have witnessed will not come to pass.

== Reception ==
When the novel was published in 1964, Kirkus Reviews stated that the "characters have souls of wood pulp" and that "The satire on fall-out shelters, race and sex lacks inspiration."

The SF Site described Farnham's Freehold as "a difficult book", and stated that "At best, [it] is an uncomfortable book with some good points mixed in with the bad, like an elderly relative [who] can give good advice and in the next breath go off on some racist or sexist rant. At worst, Farnham's Freehold is an anti-minority, anti-woman survivalist rant. It is oftentimes frustrating. It is sometimes shocking. It is never boring." The critical work The Heritage of Heinlein describes Farnham's Freehold as not "an altogether successful novel" and that the book's sexism "may be a crucial flaw."

Charles Stross has rhetorically asked whether "anyone [has] a kind word to say for ... Farnham's Freehold", and then described it as the result of "a privileged white male from California, a notoriously exclusionary state, trying to understand American racism in the pre–Martin Luther King era. And getting it wrong for facepalm values of wrong, so wrong he wasn't even on the right map ... but at least he wasn't ignoring it."

The New Republic, while conceding Heinlein's desire to "show the evils of ethnic oppression", states that in the process Heinlein "resurrected some of the most horrific racial stereotypes imaginable," ultimately producing "an anti-racist novel only a Klansman could love."

== Freeholders ==
The name "freeholders" was adopted by some survivalists in the 1980s in reference to the novel.
