= Andrew Jackson Libby =

Fictional character created by Robert Heinlein

Andrew Jackson "Slipstick" Libby is a fictional character featured in the "Future History" series of science fiction novels by Robert A. Heinlein. He is an enormously-talented and intuitive mathematician but received little formal education. His talent was first appreciated in the short story "Misfit" in which he helps guide an asteroid into the correct orbit after the guidance computer has failed.

In The Number of the Beast, it is revealed that his consciousness was transferred after his death into a female clone who took the name Elizabeth Andrew Jackson Libby.
