= Lazarus Long =

Fictional character in novels by Robert A. Heinlein

- First appearance: Methuselah's Children
- Last appearance: To Sail Beyond the Sunset
- Created by: Robert A. Heinlein
- Birth year: 1912
- Birth place: Earth
- Ethnicity: Caucasian
- Known for: Oldest (fictional) member of the human race

In-universe information
- Full name: Woodrow Wilson Smith
- Alias: Ernest Gibbons; Captain Aaron Sheffield "Happy" Daze; Proscribed Prisoner No. 83M2742; Mr. Justice Lenox; Dr. Lafayette 'Lafe' Hubert; Corporal Ted Bronson; His Serenity Seraphim the Younger, Supreme High Priest of the One God in All His Aspects and Arbiter Below and Above.
- Gender: Male
- Title: Senior
- Occupation: actor, musician, beggar, farmer, priest, pilot, politician, con artist, gambler, doctor, lawyer, banker, merchant, soldier, electronics technician, mechanic, restaurateur, investor, bordello manager, and slave.
- Family: Howard families
- Children: Lapis Lazuli, Lorelei Lee (XX-parity clones), as well as many others unnamed.
- Nationality: American

Lazarus Long is a fictional character featured in a number of science fiction novels by American writer Robert A. Heinlein. Born in 1912 in the third generation of a selective breeding experiment run by the Ira Howard Foundation, Lazarus (birth name Woodrow Wilson Smith) becomes unusually long-lived, living well over two thousand years with the aid of occasional rejuvenation treatments. Heinlein "patterned" Long on science fiction writer Edward E. Smith, mixed with Jack Williamson's fictional Giles Habibula.

His exact (natural) life span is never revealed. In his introduction at the beginning of Methuselah's Children, he claims he is 213 years old. Approximately 75 years pass during the course of the novel, but because large amounts of this time are spent traveling close to the speed of light, the 75-year measurement is an expression of the time elapsed on Earth, rather than time seen from his perspective. At one point, he estimates his natural life span to be around 250 years, but this number is not expressed with certainty. He acknowledges that such a long life span should not be expected as a result of a mere three generations of selective breeding, but offers no alternative explanation except by having a character declare: "A mutation, of course — which simply says that we don't know".

In Methuselah's Children, Long mentions visiting Hugo Pinero, the scientist appearing in Heinlein's first published story "Life-Line", who had invented a machine that precisely measured lifespan. Pinero refuses to reveal the results of Lazarus's reading and returns his money.

The promotional copy on the back of Time Enough for Love, the second book featuring Lazarus Long, states that Lazarus was "so in love with time that he became his own ancestor", but this never happens in any of the published books. In the book, Lazarus does travel back in time and is seduced by his mother, but this takes place years after his own birth. Heinlein did, however, use just such a plot device in the short story "'—All You Zombies—'", in which a character becomes both of his own parents.

A rugged individualist with a distrust of authority, Lazarus drifts from world to world, settling down periodically and leaving when the situation becomes too regimented for his taste, often just before an angry mob arrives to capture him.

The Lazarus Long set of books involve time travel, parallel dimensions, free love, individualism, and a concept that Heinlein named World as Myth — the theory that universes are created by the act of imagining them, such that even fictional worlds are real.

== Appearances ==
Novels featuring Lazarus include:

- Methuselah's Children (serialized 1941, expanded to novel 1958)
- Time Enough for Love (1973)
- The Number of the Beast (1980)
- The Cat Who Walks Through Walls (1985)
- To Sail Beyond the Sunset (1987)

The Notebooks of Lazarus Long, a book containing sayings of the character Lazarus Long largely taken from Time Enough for Love, was published in 1978.

James Gifford postulates that Doctor MacRae in Red Planet may also be another incarnation of Lazarus Long: "McRae's [sic] actions and description, combined with Lazarus Long's brief discussions of his early history in Methuselah's Children and Time Enough for Love, would seem to say so. There is no conclusive evidence one way or another. But the pieces fit together rather well, and Heinlein must have had some reason for including the anomalous and cryptic reference to McRae's [sic] recall of events that apparently predate his birth."

== Methuselah's Children ==
When the character of Lazarus Long is introduced in Methuselah's Children, he is 213 years old, and the breeding experiment that created the Howard Families has proven to be a success, with most "Howards" enjoying a lifespan of approximately 150 years and changing identities periodically to conceal their long lifespans. Ten percent of them have elected to end "The Masquerade" and live publicly, with the approval of the Howard Foundation, but this process has backfired.

The general public of Earth, once exposed to the Howards' lifespan, believes incorrectly that the Howards have discovered an anti-aging process that they are choosing to conceal, and come to resent them. Civil liberties applied to the Howards are suspended and, with the exception of Lazarus, the entire membership of the Howard Families is detained.

With the aid of the elected head of the world government, Slayton Ford, Lazarus hijacks the New Frontiers, a starship designed to travel to distant stars, and liberates the Howards. While the New Frontiers was designed to sustain a colony in travel at speeds significantly below the speed of light, a Howard named Andrew Jackson "Slipstick" Libby increases the ship's top speed to nearly the speed of light. With the ship thus modified, the Howard Families, under the leadership of Lazarus Long, escape the Solar System in search of a planet of their own.

The first planet they encounter is populated by the Jockaira, an intelligent species that has been domesticated for another, unnamed and undescribed, species, whom they worship as gods. When the latter discover that the humans cannot be domesticated, all of the humans are forcibly removed from the planet and placed in their ship, which is then transferred to another star system and planet by means of technology sufficiently advanced that it is not observable by the humans.

This second planet is populated by a diminutive furry species called the "Little People", who are a very advanced collective intelligence. They are very accommodating to the humans. In fact, their world is pleasant enough to be considered a paradise. After many years, Mary Sperling — a close friend of Lazarus and the second-oldest of the Howard Families — joins the collective intelligence in order to escape thanatophobia, whereupon Lazarus and many other Howards return to Earth. Approximately twelve thousand remain behind.

Upon return to Earth, the Howards learn that a rejuvenation treatment has been developed to approximate the secret of longevity supposedly held by them, thus permitting Lazarus, who has grown old, to regain his youth.

Note that Heinlein's basic concept in Methuselah's Children bears some similarities to George Bernard Shaw's Back to Methuselah, which Heinlein had mentioned having read.

== Time Enough for Love ==
At the beginning of this book, Lazarus has grown weary of life and decides to die. He returns to Secundus, where a standing order is in place to notify the Chairman Pro Tempore of the Howard Families if he came on world. He is located and, without his consent, subjected to rejuvenation at the behest of his descendant Ira Weatheral, Chairman Pro Tempore of the Howard Families, who believes that the society and culture of Secundus are in death throes, and wishes to lead the Families to a new planet named Tertius, having had Lazarus advise him in doing so. Lazarus later agrees, promising to commit suicide if Ira does not meet his demands, and in exchange, Ira orders a search to find Lazarus a new amusement. This search, using a "Zwicky box", is performed by an artificial intelligence named Minerva, who handles most of the computerized functions of the planetary government, is in love with Ira, and becomes friends with Lazarus. Meanwhile, the latter's rejuvenator, named Ishtar, and Ira's daughter, named Hamadryad, both give birth to female clones of him, their Y chromosome being replaced by an identical copy of the X chromosome, producing "daughters" named Lapis Lazuli and Lorelei Lee. Lazarus' advice to Ira appears alternately as proverbs and as stories.

Lazarus assists Ira in the migration to Tertius, settles the latter, and attempts a trans-temporal journey to Earth, around 1919–1929, but mistakenly arrives in 1916, there to insinuate himself into his parents' family under the name of "Ted Bronson", whom his grandfather Ira suspects to be an illegitimate nephew or son of his own. Lazarus also discovers, to his surprise and (initial) shame, a sexual desire of his own mother, Maureen. When his family learns that he has no plans to join the army in World War I, they spurn him, prompting him to enlist. His genetic father, Brian Smith, an officer, makes arrangements for him to go overseas, thinking that he is doing "Ted" a favor.

Before deployment, Lazarus again visits his family, whereupon he learns that Maureen is as attracted to him as he is to her. She explains that her husband does not insist on fidelity, although she is careful not to become pregnant by any man but Brian, and being newly pregnant, consummates her attraction to Lazarus. Overseas, Lazarus is seriously wounded in combat, but is rescued by his Tertian household.

== Other novels ==
In The Number of the Beast, the main characters discover a way to travel to fictional worlds, and in the course of their explorations, visit the world of Lazarus Long. Using the technology of these characters' ship (which can travel through space and time), Lazarus snatches his mother out of the time stream at the end of her life and replaces her with a dead clone.

In The Pursuit of the Pankera, which is a parallel novel of The Number of the Beast, Lazarus is mentioned by the name "Doc Lafe Hubert" (a known alternate name for Lazarus), who claims to have "delivered over twelve thousand babies[,] about fifty of them his own", and later in the book: "After this ruckus, Maureen wants your family to visit ours."

Lazarus also appears as a minor character in The Cat Who Walks Through Walls and plays a role in Heinlein's last novel, To Sail Beyond the Sunset, which is the life story of Maureen. In the former novel, Lazarus is revealed at the end of the novel as the father of protagonist Colin "Richard Ames" Campbell, whereas in the latter novel, Maureen as narrator tells a somewhat different version of Lazarus' visit to Earth in 1916–1918, details that information about the future received from Lazarus was crucial to the Howard Foundation's survival of the Great Depression, and reveals that Lazarus (as Woodrow "Bill" Smith) was the backup pilot of the first lunar expedition.
