= Glory Road =

1963 science fantasy novel by Robert A. Heinlein

- Cover of the first edition of Glory Road
- Author: Robert A. Heinlein
- Cover artist: Irv Docktor
- Language: English
- Genre: Fantasy, science fiction
- Publisher: G. P. Putnam's Sons
- Publication date: 1963
- Publication place: United States
- Media type: Print (Hardcover and paperback)

Glory Road is a science fantasy novel by American writer Robert A. Heinlein, originally serialized in The Magazine of Fantasy & Science Fiction (July – September 1963) and published in hardcover the same year. It was nominated for the Hugo Award for Best Novel in 1964.

In the novel, an unemployed war veteran with a facial scar responds to a newspaper ad and is hired to join a quest to retrieve the Egg of the Phoenix. After fighting the Egg's guardian Cyrano de Bergerac, the character and his employers retrieve the Egg and escape. The character marries his employer Star and moves with her to an alternate universe. Star is an Empress whose life has been extended indefinitely by medical treatments, and the Egg contains the knowledge and experiences of her predecessors. Bored with the life of the idle rich which he experiences, the main character returns to planet Earth and seeks another adventure.

== Plot summary ==
Evelyn Cyril "E.C." Gordon (also known as "Easy" and "Flash") has been recently discharged from an unnamed war in Southeast Asia. He is pondering what to do with his future and considers spending a year traveling in France. He is presented with a dilemma: follow up on a possible winning entry in the Irish Sweepstakes or respond to a newspaper ad that asks "Are you a coward?". He settles on the latter, discovering it has been placed by Star, a stunningly gorgeous woman he has previously met on Île du Levant. Star informs him that he is the one to embark on a perilous quest to retrieve the Egg of the Phoenix. When she asks what to call him, he wants to suggest Scarface, referring to the scar on his face, but she stops him as he is saying "Oh, Scar..." and repeats this as "Oscar", and thus gives him his new name. Along with Rufo, her assistant, who appears to be a man in his fifties, they tread the "Glory Road" in swashbuckling style, slaying dragons and other exotic creatures.

Shortly before the final Quest for the Egg itself, Oscar and Star marry. The team then proceeds to enter the tower in which the Egg has been hidden, navigating a maze of illusions and optical tricks. Oscar scouts ahead and encounters a fearsome foe who, though unnamed, is clearly the legendary 17th-century swordsman Cyrano de Bergerac, the final guardian of the Egg. After a long fight, the party escapes with the Egg. When they arrive in the home universe of Star and Rufo, Rufo informs Oscar that Star is actually the Empress of many worlds—and Rufo's grandmother.

The Egg is a cybernetic device that contains the knowledge and experiences of most of her predecessors. Despite her youthful appearance, she is the mother of dozens of children (by egg donation) and has undergone special medical treatments that extend her life much longer than usual. She has Oscar unknowingly receive the same treatments.

Initially, Oscar enjoys his new-found prestige and luxurious life as the husband of the Empress of the Twenty Universes. However, as time goes on, he grows bored and feels out of place and useless. When he demands Star's professional judgment, she tells him that he must leave; her world has no place or need for a hero of his stature. It will be decades before she can complete the transfer of the knowledge held in the Egg, so he must go alone. He returns to Earth but has difficulty readjusting to his own world, despite having brought great wealth along with him. He begins to doubt his own sanity and whether the adventure even happened. The story ends as he is contacted by Rufo to set up another trip along the Glory Road.

== Reception ==
Samuel R. Delany called the novel "endlessly fascinating" and said that it "maintains a delicacy, a bravura, and a joy". The novel's second half has been praised as intriguing, as it goes into what happens after a typical hero's journey is finished. Oscar is married to a ruler in a situation that should be "happily ever after" and the end of many works, yet the novel continues rather than stops: having nothing to do and nothing new to conquer is itself a struggle for Oscar.

Glory Road was nominated for the Hugo Award for Best Novel in 1964, losing to Way Station by Clifford D. Simak.
