= I Will Fear No Evil =

1970 science fiction novel by Robert A. Heinlein

- First edition cover
- Author: Robert A. Heinlein
- Language: English
- Genre: Science fiction
- Published: 1970 G. P. Putnam's Sons
- Publication place: United States
- Media type: Print (hardback & paperback)

I Will Fear No Evil is a science fiction novel by American writer Robert A. Heinlein, originally serialized in Galaxy (July, August/September, October/November, December 1970) and published in hardcover in 1970. The title is taken from Psalm 23:4.

== Plot summary ==
The story takes place in the early 21st century against a background of an overpopulated Earth with a violent, dysfunctional society. Elderly billionaire Johann Sebastian Bach Smith is being kept alive through medical support and decides to have his brain transplanted into a new body. He advertises an offer of a million dollars for the donation of a body from a brain-dead patient. Smith omits to place any restriction on the sex of the donor, so when his beautiful young female secretary, Eunice Branca, is killed, her body is used—without his knowledge and to the distress of some of those around him. He changes his name to Joan Eunice Smith, with the first name given "the two-syllable pronunciation" Jo-Ann to mimic the sound of his original name.

After Smith awakens after the transplant, he discovers he can communicate with Eunice's personality. They agree not to reveal her existence, fearing that they would be judged insane and locked up. Smith's identity is unsuccessfully challenged by his descendants, who hope to inherit his fortune. Smith and Eunice decide to have a baby together and so they (Joan and Eunice) are artificially inseminated using Smith's sperm from a sperm bank. Joan explores her new sexuality at length. She goes to visit Eunice's widower, Joe Branca, to help reconcile him to what has happened.

Joan marries her long-term lawyer, Jake Salomon, and moves her household and friends onto a boat. Jake has a massive rupture of a large blood vessel in his brain and dies, but his personality is saved and joins Smith and Eunice in Joan's head. She (Joan, Eunice and Jake) emigrates to the Moon to find a better future for her child. Once there, her body starts to reject her (Smith's) transplanted brain. She dies during childbirth, but the various personalities are implied to meet in the newborn child's brain.

== Writing ==
Heinlein suffered from life-threatening peritonitis after completing the first draft of this novel. He remained ill for the next two years and the book is thought to have been published without his usual editing and polish.

== Reception ==
The novel was voted the ninth best science fiction novel of 1970 by readers of Locus magazine.

Alexei Panshin writes: "It is a sad thing for a writer to see the decline of a man like Heinlein. [...] There is no generous way to put it—I Will Fear No Evil is a very bad book. It is clumsy, self-indulgent, shallow and boring."

Baird Searles wrote in 1979 that the book is "generally regarded as his least successful novel (to put it kindly)."

Kirkus Reviews says, "As nearly as we could determine between the points, hither, thither and whither our mind was wandering, this is very little science and very little fiction by an author who has done a great deal under that umbrella of the sky."

== See also ==
- Repository for Germinal Choice
