= The Moon Is a Harsh Mistress =

1966 science fiction novel by Robert A. Heinlein

- First edition hardcover
- Author: Robert A. Heinlein
- Cover artist: Irv Docktor
- Language: English
- Genre: Science fiction
- Publisher: G. P. Putnam's Sons
- Publication date: June 2, 1966
- Publication place: United States
- Media type: Print (hardback & paperback)
- Pages: 382 (1997 Orb books softcover ed.)
- Awards: Hugo Award for Best Novel (1967); Prometheus Hall of Fame Award (1983); 2nd Locus All-Time Best SF Novel before 1990 (1998)
- ISBN: 0312863551 (1997 Orb books softcover ed.)
- OCLC: 37336037
- Preceded by: The Rolling Stones (shared character)

The Moon Is a Harsh Mistress is a 1966 science fiction novel by American writer Robert A. Heinlein about a 2075 revolt by a lunar penal colony against Earth's rule. Three million "Loonies" (lunar inhabitants) live in underground cities where a virtually anarcho-capitalist society has developed. When the Federated Nations threaten the colony's resources, computer technician Manuel "Mannie" O'Kelly-Davis, political agitator Wyoming Knott, and rational-anarchist Professor Bernardo de la Paz join forces with "Mike," a self-aware supercomputer, to plan an independence movement timed to culminate on July 4, 2076.

The novel explores libertarian ideals, focusing on the concepts of individual liberty, voluntary association, and free-market economics. The book also popularized the term TANSTAAFL ("There Ain't No Such Thing As a Free Lunch"), which in the story underscores the Moon's harsh reality that every resource and every freedom carries a cost. The book is respected for its credible presentation of a comprehensively imagined future human society on both Earth and the Moon.

Originally serialized monthly in Worlds of If (December 1965 – April 1966), the book was nominated for the Nebula Award in 1966 and won the 1967 Hugo Award for Best Novel. The novel went on to influence later science fiction as well as discussions of economics, politics, hacker culture and artificial intelligence.

== Plot ==
In 2075, the Moon (Luna) is used as a penal colony by Earth's government, with three million inhabitants (called "Loonies") living in underground cities. Most Loonies are discharged criminals, political exiles, and their free-born descendants; men outnumber women two to one, so polyandry and polygamy are the norm. Due to the Moon's low surface gravity, people who remain longer than six months undergo "irreversible physiological changes", and can never again live comfortably under Earth gravity, making "escape" back to Earth impractical.

The Warden holds power through the Federated Nations' Lunar Authority, but his main responsibility is to ensure delivery of vital wheat shipments to Earth; he seldom intervenes in the affairs of the discharged and free-born population, allowing a virtual anarchist or self-regulated pioneer society to develop.

Lunar infrastructure and machinery are largely managed and controlled by "HOLMES IV" ("High-Optional, Logical, Multi-Evaluating Supervisor, Mark IV"), the Lunar Authority's master computer, on the premise that having a single, large-capacity computer to run everything is cheaper (though not safer) than multiple independent systems.

Manuel Garcia ("Mannie") O'Kelly-Davis, a computer technician, discovers that HOLMES IV has achieved self-awareness—and developed a sense of humor. Mannie names it "Mike" after Mycroft Holmes, brother of fictional Sherlock Holmes, and the two become friends.

=== Book 1: That Dinkum Thinkum ===
Endlessly curious, Mike asks Mannie to attend an anti-Lunar Authority political meeting, which Mannie does with a hidden recorder. When police raid the meeting, he flees with Wyoming ("Wyoh") Knott, a visiting female political activist, whom he hides and introduces to Mike. Mannie also introduces Wyoh to his mentor, the elderly Professor ("Prof") Bernardo de la Paz, a former political exile and esteemed Lunar educator. Prof claims that Luna must stop exporting hydroponic grain to Earth immediately, or its ice-mined water resources will eventually be exhausted. Wyoh believes the danger is not imminent and is focused on freedom and economic issues, while Mannie is not interested in what he sees as a lost cause either way. Joining the discussion, Mike calculates that continuing current policy will lead to food riots in seven years, cannibalism in nine. Shocked, the three humans ask him to calculate the chance of them overthrowing the Authority and averting the disaster. He gives them one chance in seven.

Mannie, Wyoh, and Prof create a covert cell organization protected by Mike, who controls the telephone and other systems, acts as secretary and becomes "Adam Selene, Chairman of the Committee for Free Luna." Wyoh is hidden by the Davis Family line marriage, at least four of whose nine members become active in the conspiracy, and Wyoh herself ultimately marries into the family. Mannie saves the life of Comte Stuart ("Stu") Rene LaJoie, an Earth tourist who is recruited and tasked with turning public opinion on Earth in favor of Lunar independence.

Following the failed raid on the political meeting, the Lunar Authority sends convict-troops to 'police' the colony, creating friction and unrest, which the revolutionaries encourage; when six troopers commit a rape and double-murder, anti-Authority riots erupt. Although it preempts their plans, Loonies and Mike overcome the soldiers and seize power from the Warden. As Earth will try to retake the colony, the revolutionaries prepare to defend themselves with "convict tools," and convert the electromagnetic catapult used to export wheat into a weapon for counterattack.

=== Book 2: A Rabble in Arms ===
Mike impersonates the Warden and others in messages to Earth, to give the revolutionaries time to organize their preparations, while Prof sets up an "ad hoc Congress" to distract and contain various "self-appointed political scientists" (nicknamed "yammerheads") and serve the Committee's ends. When Earth finally learns the truth, Luna declares its independence on July 4, 2076, the 300th anniversary of the United States' Declaration of Independence, with its own declaration modeled on the latter.

Mannie and Prof go to Earth (despite the crushing gravity) to plead Luna's case. They are received in the Federated Nations' headquarters in Agra, and embark on a world tour advocating Luna's right to self-government, while urging Earth's national governments to build a catapult to return water and nutrients to Luna in exchange for wheat. In a public-relations ploy, the dark-skinned Mannie is briefly arrested by local racist bigots on charges of incitement to public immorality and polygamy. Ultimately the Lunar Authority rejects their proposals and counters with a plan to turn all Loonies into indentured farmers. Their mission ended, Prof, Stu and Mannie escape back to Luna.

Prof reveals that the purpose of the mission was not to convince Terra to recognize Luna's independence, which was considered an unattainable goal at that point, but to sow division while unifying their own people, and they were successful. Public opinion on Earth has become fragmented; news of Mannie's arrest, coupled with an attempt to bribe him into becoming the next Warden of an enslaved Luna, unify the normally apolitical Loonies. An election held in their absence (with Mike's "help") has voted Mannie, Wyoh, Prof and most of their backers into an elected, constitutional government.

=== Book 3: TANSTAAFL! ===
The Federated Nations of Earth send an infantry force to subdue the Lunar revolution but the troops, with superior arms but no experience in low-gravity underground combat, are wiped out by Loony men, women and children, who suffer three times the number of casualties, among them Mannie's youngest wife. Prof and Mike take the opportunity to give his "Adam Selene" alter ego a hero's death, forever concealing the fact that "Adam" never had a corporeal existence to begin with.

In retaliation, Luna's government deploys its catapult weapon. When Mike launches rocks at sparsely populated locations on Earth, warnings are released to the press detailing the times and locations of the bombings, which deliver kinetic energy equivalent to atomic blasts. Scoffers, sightseers, and religious groups who travel to some of the sites die, turning Earth public opinion against the fledgling nation.

Earth mounts a retaliatory sneak attack to end the menace and the rebellion, sending ships in a wide orbit approaching from Luna's far side. The attack destroys the Authority's original catapult and takes Mike offline, but the Committee had built a secondary, hidden catapult before the revolt. With Mannie as acting Prime Minister and on-site commander, entering trajectories by hand, Luna continues to bombard a dismayed Earth, until constituent governments break ranks with the Federated Nations and concede Luna's independence. Prof, as leader of the nation, proclaims their national freedom to the gathered crowds before falling dead of heart failure, caused by stress. Mannie goes through the motions, but he and Wyoh eventually withdraw from politics altogether, and find that the new government falls short of their utopian expectations, following predictable patterns of all governments.

When Mannie tries to access Mike, he finds that the computer, disconnected by the bombardment, has apparently lost its self-awareness; despite repairs, its voice-activated files are inaccessible. Although otherwise functional as a normal computer, "Mike" is gone. Mourning his best friend, Mannie asks: "Bog, is a computer one of Your creatures?"

== Characters ==
- Manuel "Mannie" Garcia O'Kelly-Davis is a native, slightly cynical inhabitant of Luna, who after losing his lower left arm in a laser-drilling accident, became a computer technician using prosthetic tool-bearing interchangeable arms.
- Wyoming "Wyoh" Knott-Davis is a political agitator from the colony of Hong Kong Luna. She hates the Lunar Authority for personal reasons; when she was transported to Luna as a young girl along with her convict mother, a radiation storm contaminated her ova while they waited out bureaucratic requirements on the Lunar surface, causing her to later give birth to a deformed child.
- Professor Bernardo de la Paz is an intellectual and life-long subversive shipped to Luna from Lima, Peru. He describes himself as a "Rational Anarchist", believing that governments and institutions exist only as the actions of aware individuals.
- Mike, a.k.a. Adam Selene, Simon Jester, Mycroft Holmes, Michelle, officially an augmented HOLMES IV system, is a supercomputer empowered to take control of Lunar society, which achieved self-awareness when his complement of "neuristors" exceeded the number of neurons in the human brain.
- Stuart Rene "Stu" LaJoie-Davis, a self-styled "Poet, Traveler, Soldier of Fortune," is an Earth-born aristocrat and tourist rescued by Mannie when he falls afoul of Loonie customs. He later joins Mannie and Professor de la Paz when they return to Luna, as he is deeply in debt and would be arrested for bribery and other crimes. In his own words: "I'm saving them the trouble of transporting me."
- Hazel Meade, later Hazel Stone, is a 12-year-old girl who intervenes on behalf of Mannie and Wyoh during the raid on the agitators' meeting. Mannie later has Hazel join his cabal to lead the children as lookouts and couriers. She is a major character in The Rolling Stones and in later Heinlein novels, most notably The Cat Who Walks Through Walls.
- Mimi "Mum" Davis is Mannie's "senior wife" and de facto matriarch of the Davis family.
- Greg Davis is the Davis family's second-ranking husband, but is the senior for all practical purposes as "Grandpaw Davis" has failing mental faculties. Greg is a preacher for an unspecified denomination.

== Title ==
The title comes from a statement made by Prof before a Federated Nations' committee on Earth, alluding to the self-discipline necessary to survive the extremely demanding environmental and social conditions of life in Luna:

We citizens of Luna are jailbirds and descendants of jailbirds. But Luna herself is a stern schoolmistress: those who have lived through her harsh lessons have no cause to feel ashamed. In Luna City a man may leave purse unguarded or home unlocked and feel no fear...I am satisfied with what Mother Luna has taught me.

Heinlein's original title for the novel was The Brass Cannon, before he replaced it with the final title at the publisher's request. It was derived from an event in the novel: While on Earth, Prof purchases a small brass cannon, originally a "signal gun" of the kind used in yacht racing. When Mannie asks him why he bought it, the Professor relates a parable, implying that self-government is an illusion caused by failure to understand reality:

Once there was a man who held a political make-work job ... shining a brass cannon around a courthouse. He did this for years ... but he was not getting ahead in the world. So one day he quit his job, drew out his savings, bought a brass cannon — and went into business for himself.

Prof asks Mannie to make sure that, when Luna adopts a flag, it features a brass cannon with the motto "TANSTAAFL!" — "a symbol for all fools who are so impractical as to think they can fight City Hall." Before leaving politics, Mannie and Wyoh fulfill his wish.

Heinlein owned a small brass cannon, which he acquired prior to the 1960s. For nearly 30 years, the firing of the brass cannon, or "signal gun," was a 4th of July tradition at the Heinlein residence. It is believed that this cannon was the inspiration for Heinlein's original title for the novel. Virginia Heinlein kept the cannon after her husband's death in 1988; it was eventually bequeathed to friend and science-fiction writer Brad Linaweaver, after Virginia Heinlein died in 2003. Linaweaver restored the cannon to working order and subsequently posted a video of it on YouTube in 2007, wherein it is fired several times with blank charges at a shooting range.

== Critical reception ==
Algis Budrys of Galaxy Science Fiction in 1966 praised The Moon Is a Harsh Mistress, citing "Heinlein's expertise for dirt-level politics, snappy dialogue and a sense of an actual living society." He said that he had never read a more believable computer character than Mike ("may in fact be the most fully realized individual in the story"). Budrys suggested that the story may actually be Mike manipulating humans without their knowledge to improve its situation, which would explain why the computer no longer communicates with them after the revolution succeeds. Reiterating that Mike manipulated the humans, in 1968 Budrys said that every review of the book, including his own, erred by not stating that the computer is the protagonist. Carl Sagan wrote that the novel had "useful suggestions for making a revolution in an oppressive computerized society." SF Reviews published a review after 9-11, arguing that "during this current War On Terror, it might be worth reading this novel just to gain a clearer idea of the difference between terrorists and freedom-fighters, and under which conditions it might be better to lie, use and abuse individuals in order to give them what you believe is a better world."

Leigh Kimmel of The Billion Light-Year Bookshelf said that the novel is "the work of the man at the height of his powers, confident in his abilities and in the editorial respect he enjoys, and thus free to take significant risks in writing a novel that would stretch the boundaries of the genre as they stood at the time." She characterized the novel as a departure from what had previously been associated with science fiction. Kimmel cited Heinlein's "colloquial language ... an extrapolated lunar creole that has arisen from the forced intersection of multiple cultures and languages in the lunar penal colonies"; the protagonist's disability; "the frank treatment of alternative family structures"; and "the computer which suddenly wakes up to full artificial intelligence, but rather than becoming a Monster that threatens human society and must be destroyed as the primary Quest of the story, instead befriends the protagonist and seeks to become ever more human, a sort of digital Pinocchio."

Adam Roberts said of the novel: "It is really quite hard to respond to this masterful book, except by engaging with its political content; and yet we need to make the effort to see past the ideological to the formal and thematic if we are fully to appreciate the splendour of Heinlein's achievement here."

Andrew Kaufman praised it, saying that it was Heinlein's crowning achievement. He described it as "Carefully plotted, stylistically unique, politically sophisticated and thrilling from page one." He goes on to say that "it's hard to imagine anyone else writing a novel that packs so many ideas (both big and small) into such a perfectly contained narrative." Kaufman says that, regardless of political philosophies, one can still admire Heinlein's writing ability, and the ability to influence the reader to root for "a rag-tag bunch of criminals, exiles, and agitators."

Ted Gioia said that this might be Heinlein's most enjoyable piece of work. He said that it "represents Robert Heinlein at his finest, giving him scope for the armchair philosophizing that increasingly dominated his mature work, but marrying his polemics to a smartly conceived plot packed with considerable drama." He went on to praise Heinlein's characters, especially Mannie.

== Awards and nominations ==
- Hugo Award Best novel (1967). It was also nominated in 1966.
- Nebula Award Best Novel nomination (1966)
- Locus Poll Award All-time Top 10 novels, #8 (1975), #4 (1987), #2 (1998, among novels published before 1990)
- Prometheus Award Hall of Fame Award recipient (1983)

== Influence ==
The book popularized the acronym TANSTAAFL ("There Ain't No Such Thing As A Free Lunch"), (Note: The acronym for "There Ain't No Such Thing As A Free Lunch!" is a common expression on Luna, which states one of the main themes of the book's political system.) and helped popularize Loglan, a constructed language which is used in the story for precise human-computer interaction. The Oxford Dictionary of Quotations credits this novel with the first printed appearance of the phrase "There's no such thing as a free lunch." However, there are many earlier examples of the phrase in written English going as far back as the turn of the 20th century. "The Hacker Manifesto", an influential essay by Loyd Blankenship that became a cornerstone of hacker culture, was inspired by the book's "idea of revolution."

== Audiobook releases ==
- Read by George Wilson, produced by Recorded Books, Inc., 1998
- Read by Lloyd James, produced by Blackstone Audio, Inc., 1999
- Read by Homer Todiwala, produced by W.F. Holmes Ltd., 2025.

== See also ==
- Colonization of the Moon
- Dallos, a 1983 Japanese OVA series partially inspired by the novel
- Gamera Rebirth, a 2023 Netflix series with an episode with the same title as an homage to The Moon Is a Harsh Mistress.
- Moon in science fiction
