= The Number of the Beast (novel) =

1980 novel by Robert A. Heinlein

- First edition (UK)
- Author: Robert A. Heinlein
- Cover artist: Tim White
- Language: English
- Genre: Science fiction
- Publisher: New English Library (UK); Fawcett (US)
- Publication date: July 12, 1980
- Publication place: United Kingdom and United States
- Media type: Print
- ISBN: 0-450-04736-9
- OCLC: 21020774
- Followed by: The Cat Who Walks Through Walls

The Number of the Beast is a science fiction novel by American writer Robert A. Heinlein, published in 1980. Excerpts from the novel were serialized in the magazine Omni (October–November 1979).

== Plot ==
The book is a series of multiple perspective narratives primarily by each of the four main characters: Zebadiah "Zeb" John Carter, programmer Dejah Thoris "Deety" Burroughs Carter, her mathematics professor father Jacob Burroughs, and off-campus socialite Hilda Corners. The names "Dejah Thoris", "Burroughs", and "Carter" are overt references to John Carter and Dejah Thoris, the protagonists of the Barsoom novels by Edgar Rice Burroughs.

In the opening, Deety is dancing with Zeb at a party at Hilda's mansion. Deety is trying to get Zeb to meet her father to discuss what she thinks is an article Zeb wrote about n-dimensional space, even going so far as to offer herself. Zeb figures out and explains to Deety that he is not the one who wrote the article but a relative with a similar name.

After dancing a very intimate tango, Zeb jokingly suggests the dance was so strong they should get married, and Deety agrees. Zeb is taken aback but then accepts. As they are leaving, Deety and Zeb rescue Jacob from a heated argument he is having with another faculty member before a fight breaks out. As they are approaching their vehicles, Hilda comes out, deciding to tag along. Zeb, having a premonition, grabs the three of them and ducks behind another vehicle before Jacob and Deety's vehicle explodes. Zeb gets everyone into his modified air car Gay Deceiver and by activating the Deceiver's flying capability, escapes undetected by the authorities or the criminals who put a bomb in the other vehicle.

Zeb flies to Elko, Nevada, the state being the only one to allow people to get married 24 hours a day with no waiting period or blood test. The incidents have so traumatized Jacob that he has agreed to marry Hilda and so they have a double ceremony. The couples then go to Jacob's hidden cabin in the woods, where they have their honeymoons.

Thus begins the series of adventures that the four embark upon as they travel in the Gay Deceiver, which is equipped with the professor's "continua" device and armed by the Australian Defence Force. The continua device was built by Professor Burroughs while he was formulating his theories on n-dimensional non-Euclidean geometry.

The geometry of the novel's universe contains six dimensions – the three spatial dimensions, known to the real world, and three time dimensions: t, the real world's temporal dimension, τ (Greek tau), and т (Cyrillic te). The continua device can travel on all six axes. The continua device allows travel into various fictional universes, such as the Land of Oz, as well as through time.

An attempt by the four adventurers to visit Barsoom takes them to an apparently different version of Mars: the Great Game (replete with ornithopters) was being played out between the Russian Empire and the Victorian era British Empire in an early example of the Steampunk genre.

=== Title ===
In the novel, the biblical number of the beast turns out to be not 666 but $6^{6^6}$ = $6^{36}$ = 10,314,424,798,490,535,546,171,949,056, the initial number of parallel universes accessible through the fictional "continua device". It is later theorized by the character Jacob that the number might only represent the instantly accessible universes from a given location, i.e., that there is a larger structure that implies an infinite number of universes.

== Literary significance and reception ==
Jack Kirwan wrote in National Review that the novel is "about two men and two women in a time machine safari through this and other universes. But describing The Number of the Beast thus is like saying Moby Dick is about a one-legged guy trying to catch a fish." He went on to state that Heinlein celebrates the "competent person".

Sue K. Hurwitz wrote in her review for the School Library Journal that it is "a catalog of Heinlein's sins as an author; it is sophomoric, sexist, militantly right wing, and excessively verbose" and commentary that the book's ending was "a devastating parody of SF conventions—will have genre addicts rolling on the floor. It's garbage, but right from the top of the heap."

Heinlein buff David Potter (Gharlane of Eddore) explained on the Usenet newsgroup alt.fan.heinlein, in a posting reprinted on the Heinlein Society, that the entire book is actually "one of the greatest textbooks on narrative fiction ever produced, with a truly magnificent set of examples of how not to do it right there in the foreground, and constant explanations of how to do it right, with literary references to people and books that did do it right, in the background." He noted that "every single time there's a boring lecture or tedious character interaction going on in the foreground, there's an example of how to do it right in the background."

Greg Costikyan reviewed The Number of the Beast in Ares Magazine #5 and commented: "No one writes like Heinlein, and what is a disappointment from him would be a smashing success from anyone else."

James Nicoll has credited The Number of the Beast for first having taught him that he does not have to finish reading every book he begins.

== The Pursuit of the Pankera ==
In 2020, a previously unpublished manuscript by Robert A. Heinlein was released as The Pursuit of the Pankera. Using the same premise and characters as The Number of the Beast, the first third of the two works of fiction are roughly the same. The remainder of The Pursuit of the Pankera then deviates, with the characters visiting various fictional universes, primarily Barsoom, Oz, and the world of E. E. Doc Smith's Lensman series.
