= Metamorphosis Alpha =

Tabletop science fiction role-playing game

- First edition cover
- Designers: James M. Ward; Slade Henson (second edition)
- Publishers: First edition TSR; Second edition TSR; Third edition Fast Forward Entertainment; Fourth edition Mudpuppy Games, First edition revised WardCo.; Fifth edition Signal Fire Studios; Sixth edition WardCo. and Troll Lord Games; Seventh edition Catalyst Game Labs
- Publication: 1976 first edition; 1994 second edition; 2002 third edition; 2006 fourth edition; 2007 first edition revised (PDF); 2011 first edition revised (POD); 2016 fifth edition; 2021 sixth edition; 2026 seventh edition (announced)
- Genres: Science fiction
- Systems: Custom, first edition; Amazing Engine, second edition, 3d6 third and fourth editions

Metamorphosis Alpha is one of the first science fiction role-playing games, (Note: Several sources call Metamorphosis Alpha the first science fiction role-playing game, but others name Starfaring as the first. Designers & Dragons: The '70s, p. 25, and the Catalog of Copyright Entries. Third Series 1976: July–December, p. 2992 give the publication date of Metamorphosis Alpha as November 1976, while Catalog of Copyright Entries. Third Series 1976: July–December, p. 3051 give Starfaring a publication date of August 1976, several months earlier. RPG historian Stu Horvath, in his 2023 book Monsters, Aliens and Holes in the Ground (p. 14), notes that TSR planned to premiere Metamorphosis Alpha at Origins Game Fair in July 1976, hence the July 1976 date in the foreword, but due to production delays it was not released until November 1976.) published in 1976. It was created by James M. Ward and originally produced by TSR, the publisher of Dungeons & Dragons.

== Description ==
The original edition is set on a generation spaceship, the starship Warden, which has been struck by an unknown cataclysmic event that killed many of the colonists and crew. The characters must survive their missions in the ship, which they believe to be a world. They no longer understand the technology around them, and they encounter numerous mutated creatures.

Players can portray a human, a mutated human, a mutated plant, or a mutated creature. Articles in Dragon expanded those options to include clones and robots as well as adding rules for cybernetics. Players have five characteristics: radiation resistance, mental resistance, dexterity, strength, and constitution. Humans have a sixth characteristic, leadership potential, while mutated humans and creatures add a random number of mutations, both physical and mental. Metamorphosis Alpha's combat rules resemble those in the original edition of Dungeons & Dragons (D&D).

Metamorphosis Alpha is the intellectual precursor to Gamma World (1978), also produced by TSR.

Though often credited as the first science-fiction RPG, Ken St. Andre's 1976 game Starfaring was the first.

== Science fiction or science fantasy? ==
Metamorphosis Alpha has an emphasis on super science and an element of science fantasy (as confirmed by the creator James M. Ward in 2006). Ward has stated that the game is not "hard sci-fi".

In 1980, TSR released AD&D module S3: Expedition to the Barrier Peaks. The module was based on the idea that a starship such as the Warden (though not the Warden itself, according to TSR founder Gary Gygax) becomes marooned in a D&D universe. In the module's foreword, Gygax writes that the module was written to introduce Metamorphosis Alpha to the wider D&D audience and to demonstrate how one might undertake science fiction/fantasy crossover.

== Inspiration ==
James M. Ward, the game's author, stated that the original inspiration for the game was Brian Aldiss's science fiction novel Non-Stop (also known as Starship, 1958). In the British RPG magazine White Dwarf, issue 1, Ian Livingstone wrote a review of the game and published his own additional rules for playing Metamorphosis Alpha on Aldiss's ship. However, it is often suggested that the game was inspired by Robert A. Heinlein's 1941 novel Orphans of the Sky. James M. Ward has stated that he was not familiar with the 1973 Canadian TV series The Starlost, a show with a similar concept, and that Metamorphosis Alpha is not based upon that series.

== Ownership and rights ==
The rights to Metamorphosis Alpha were owned by James M. Ward. Ward also owned the rights to all Metamorphosis Alpha material previously published in Dragon. WardCo. (Ward's publishing business) was granted permission by Steve Jackson Games and by Judges Guild (the estate of Bob Bledsaw Sr.) to host and republish some material. In 2008, Ward requested via public forums that sites hosting unlicensed copies of his original rules and the material previously published in Dragon magazine remove them, as they were a breach of his copyright and directly competed with products that he is selling. All permissions to host the Metamorphosis Alpha rules and the Metamorphosis Alpha articles in Dragon magazine, other than those being sold on behalf of WardCo., at sites other than at the official homepage were rescinded.

In 2010, Signal Fire Studios acquired the rights to produce a new edition of the game based upon Hasbro's fourth edition D&D.

In 2011, Ward announced that he had negotiated a deal to produce a graphic novel of Metamorphosis Alpha.

On April 11, 2024, Christopher Clark announced that "all rights to James M. Ward's Metamorphosis Alpha, the core rulebook and all its derivative works, including The Starship Warden, Dark Outpost and Dark Visitor, along with James M. Ward's Tower of the Scarlett Wizard, and James M. Ward's Monte Haul Dungeon Series (including Monty Haul's Lesser Tower of Doom and Monty Haul's Heavenly Haul) were purchased by Para Bellum Consulting." This deal was made and finalized prior to the death of James Ward in March 2024.

== Editions and supplements ==
=== First edition (1976) ===
Metamorphosis Alpha was first published in 1976 by TSR. It was written by James M. Ward and illustrated by Dave Sutherland III. During its original release, there were no supporting accessories. However, a number of releases were eventually published later:

- 1976: TSR, Inc.
  - Metamorphosis Alpha
- 2007: WardCo.
  - Metamorphosis Alpha first edition errata sheet
  - JWM001: Metamorphosis Alpha first edition (revised)
- 2010: WardCo.
  - JWM002: The House on The Hill - This adventure was written by Craig J. Brain, with bonus content by James M. Ward. The illustrations for the adventure were by Lee Smith and Dave Sutherland III. (ISBN 145360412X)
- 2012: WardCo.
  - Metamorphosis Alpha first edition – A reprint of the original edition of the game with the addition of a new adventure and a number of corrections.
- 2014: TSR Games/Solarian Games
  - P2: They All Died at the International Space Station - This adventure, written by James Ward originally saw print in Gygax Magazine #3 before being reprinted as the second of the TSR Games "pantheon series". (ISBN 978-1-945332-01-2)
- 2015: Goodman Games
  - Metamorphosis Alpha Deluxe Collector's Edition - An oversized hardbound edition consolidating other content from magazine articles, and including a new adventure (Coming of Age) and new materials.
  - The Android Underlords
  - Book of Handouts
  - The Captain's Table
  - Creatures & Gadgets
  - Death Ziggurat in Zero-G - An adventure written by Jobe Bittman. The adventure ignores much of the generation ship concept of Metamorphosis Alpha. Bittman uses post apocalyptic locations (such as a home improvement store), more in keeping with Gamma World.
  - The Level of the Lost - Written by Michael Curtis, this adventure revolves around a Jurassic Park like location hidden aboard the Warden.
  - The Long, Hard Mile
  - Metamorphosis Alpha Referee's Screen
  - The Mutation Manual
  - Warden Adventures
  - The Warden Armory
  - What Are the Prisoners of Rec-Loc-119?
- 2017: Goodman Games
  - Epsilon City - A boxed set containing a 272-page spiral-bound hardcover Epsilon City setting book, three 11”x17” maps, a 20-page cyborg supplement, and a 56-page adventure supplement. It was written by James M. Ward, with Jobe Bittman, Michael Curtis (role playing game writer), Jon Hook, and Jim Wampler.
- 2020: Goodman Games
  - Doom on the Warden

=== Second edition (1994) ===
In 1981, Ward announced plans to rewrite the game as Metamorphosis Alpha to Omega, a supplement for the first edition Gamma World rules. The Gamma World supplement was never completed, but in 1994, TSR used the title Metamorphosis Alpha to Omega for an Amazing Engine supplement (ISBN 1-56076-851-7) written by Slade Henson.

=== Third edition (2002) ===
Ward's company, Fast Forward Entertainment, published a new edition of the game, titled Metamorphosis Alpha: 25th Anniversary Edition. It was designed by Ward himself.

- 2002: Fast Forward Entertainment
  - Metamorphosis Alpha: 25th Anniversary Edition

=== Fourth edition (2006) ===
Metamorphosis Alpha fourth edition was released by Mudpuppy Games (ISBN 0-9763601-2-8). This edition contained original material by Ward and additional new material and photography by Craig J. Brain. The book cover and interior illustrations were painted and drawn by Jim Holloway with most of the cartography by Ryan Wolfe.

- 2006: Mudpuppy Games
  - Metamorphosis Alpha
- 2007: Mudpuppy Games
  - Metamorphosis Alpha fourth edition errata
- 2016: Fireside Creations
  - CS Bonnie Brown, an adventure written by Craig J. Brain.

=== Fifth edition (2016) ===
Metamorphosis Alpha fifth edition was published by Signal Fire Studios (ISBN 978-0-9894107-0-0). This edition includes material by Ward and Jamie Chambers and uses the System 26 rules set.

- 2016: Signal Fire Studios
  - Metamorphosis Alpha
- 2017: Signal Fire Studios
  - Metamorphosis Alpha Pregenerated Characters

=== Sixth edition (2021) ===
In 2021, WardCo and Troll Lord Games released The Starship Warden using the Amazing Adventures/SIEGE engine. It included a 656-page book, fully detailing the default setting of Metamorphosis Alpha and was accompanied by a number of supporting materials and was written by James M. Ward and fellow TSR alumnus Chris Clark.

- 2021: Troll Lord Games
  - The Starship Warden
  - Creatures of the Warden
  - Equipment Manifest
  - The Goya
  - Maps of the Warden
  - Saving Wren and Deck Expansions

=== Seventh edition (2026) ===
In 2025, Catalyst Game Labs announced that they were working on a special 50th anniversary release for Matamorphosis Alpha, including "modernized gameplay".

== Reception ==
In Issue 10 of The Space Gamer, Robert R. Taylor concluded that "The game is definitely first rate and quite excellent. MA is highly recommended to someone interested in buying their first role-playing game since the rules are rich with guidelines to help the player in constructing his own ship."

In Issue 17 of the British wargaming magazine Perfidious Albion, David Bolton found difficulty with the concept that players were supposed to be illiterate peasants, but that the players would probably recognize technology such as a Geiger counter from its description. Bolton warned, "This is more of a handicap than when players metagame the rules in D&D and will require very careful handling by the gamemaster." Bolton also disliked the lack of objectives in the game, noting, "there is very little in the way of objectives, short of actually surviving. No experience points for killing monsters and no level system." Bolton did like that "the imagination is limited even less than D&D. I would feel a bit guilty about having aliens with nasty laser weapons in D&D, not so in Metamorphosis Alpha." Bolton concluded, "At half the price of the basic D&D rules, I think this is a game well worth getting, especially for you Sci-Fi fans."

Writing in The Playboy Winner's Guide to Board Games, John Jackson found this game almost identical in scope and mechanics to another TSR science fiction game, Gamma World, sharing "a cast of mutated humans, animals and plants and the twin hazards of poison and radiation." Jackson recommended Gamma World over Metamorphosis Alpha based on better organization of material and a more interesting map.

In the inaugural issue of Ares, game designer Eric Goldberg thought the game too limited in scope, saying, "Metamorphosis: Alpha is Dungeons and Dragons in space. Regrettably, one can only stretch a great idea so far; this offering is far too contrived to gain acceptance in the minds of most players." Goldberg concluded by giving the game a very poor rating of only 3 out of 9.

In the 1980 book The Complete Book of Wargames, game designer Jon Freeman commented, "James Ward's Metamorphosis Alpha is an attempt ... by the people who brought you Dungeons & Dragons, and predictably, it shares many of the parent game's flaws. The rules are better constructed but the game takes itself too seriously." Freeman gave this game an Overall Evaluation of "Fair", concluding, "The game is Dungeons & Dragons in disguise; it could as easily been called Missiles & Mutants. As an honest fantasy, it would be no worse than most. As 'science fiction', it comes out looking like Gorgo Meets Star Wars."

In his 1990 book The Complete Guide to Role-Playing Games, game critic Rick Swan called this "Dungeons & Dragons in space ... Exploring the labyrinths of the spacecraft is not unlike roaming a cavern network or other dungeonlike enclosure." Swan concluded by giving the game a rating of 2.5 out of 4, suggesting the old game's true value was as a collector's item.

David M. Ewalt, in his book Of Dice and Men, commented that Metamorphosis Alpha was "notable as the first role-playing game with a science-fiction setting. The game takes place on the starship Warden, a vast spaceship built by the player characters' ancestors; in the aftermath of some unknown disaster, their progeny survive on the ship but don't understand its technology and must fight mutated creatures to ensure their survival."

Metamorphosis Alpha was chosen for inclusion in the 2007 book Hobby Games: The 100 Best. Game designer Gary Gygax explained: "Metamorphosis Alpha is a game that breaks the typical level-progression reward mold but nevertheless offers a rich, if sometimes difficult to gain, array of player rewards — from the knowledge of the environment to beneficial character mutations, learned skills to the acquisition of tech items and other equipment. Furthermore, it blends fantasy with weird and super science in a unique manner that is captivating to players with imaginations suited to such a startling mixture. Metamorphosis Alpha — in any edition — stimulates the imagination, encourages keen thinking, and breaks the mold of typical fantasy and science fiction roleplaying games. If that doesn't make it one of the best hobby games ever, I don't know what would."

In his 2023 book Monsters, Aliens, and Holes in the Ground, RPG historian Stu Horvath questioned whether this game was truly science fiction, or was simply another fantasy RPG, pointing out that the setting is simply a large self-contained 17-level dungeon where "Players are left to explore the ship, hex by hex in the 'wilderness' or square by square in the dungeons of the engineering sectors, all for material rewards ... These sort of expeditions are the core of the D&D experience and that seems so closely tied to fantasy, for me, that even the presence of laser guns and mutants can't dissuade the association."

== In other media ==
In 2004 a mold was created for a never produced Metamorphosis Alpha coin game. The mold consisted of 10 coins which would have variations in white, yellow, blue, green, and red. The mold was sold to a private collector via eBay in May 2022.

A number of books have been released, detailing further adventures aboard the Starship Warden.

- 2017: Metamorphosis Alpha: Chronicles from the Warden vol. 1: A short story collection written by Ward in collaboration with author Craig Martelle. (ISBN 9781547189960)
- 2017: Metamorphosis Alpha: Chronicles from the Starship Warden vol. 2: A short story collection edited by Craig Martelle. It includes stories by Jim Ward with Alex Bates, Craig J. Brain, Bob Brinkman, Christopher Clark, Valerie Emerson, E. E. Isherwood, Scott King, Stephen A Lee, Craig Martelle, Scott Moon, Bill Patterson, Steve Peek, and Thomas R. Rock. Three of the authors (Brain, Brinkman, and Clark) had previously worked with Jim Ward on Metamorphosis Alpha products. (ISBN 9781981665273)
- 2019: Metamorphosis Alpha: Chronicles from the Starship Warden vol. 3: A short story collection edited by Craig Martelle. It includes stories by Jim Ward with Alex Bates, Christopher Clark, James Dermond, Valerie Emerson, Bryan Hawkins, Stephen A Lee, Craig Martelle, Scott McKinley, Steve Peek, Scott Perry, Jean Rabe, Nathaniel Sims. (ISBN 9781713300359)
- 2019: Metamorphosis Alpha: Red Is the Android: A collaborative novel written by James M. Ward and Craig Martelle, detailing the struggles of Finnur Starsign against the red androids. (ISBN 9781075402135)
- 2024: Wolfoid: A collection of short stories by Ward. Only the titular story deals with Metamorphosis Alpha. (ISBN 9781960016126)

== See also ==
- Gamma World
- Non-Stop, a novel by Brian Aldiss with a similar plot
- Orphans of the Sky, a novel by Robert A. Heinlein with a similar plot
- The Starlost, a Canada/US TV series created by Harlan Ellison which ran from 1973 has a similar premise
- Hull Zero Three, a 2010 novel by Greg Bear with a similar plot
- Pandorum, a 2009 film written by Travis Milloy and directed by Christian Alvart which shares similar plot elements
