= Interstellar ark =

Conceptual space vehicle for interstellar travel

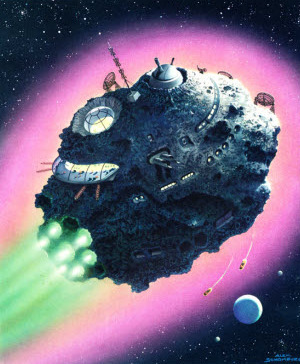
1953 illustration of a "Thousand-Year Space Ark" for Science-Fiction Plus magazine by Alex Schomburg

An interstellar ark is a conceptual starship designed for interstellar travel. Interstellar arks may be the most economically feasible method of traveling such distances. The ark has also been proposed as a potential habitat to preserve civilization and knowledge in the event of a global catastrophe.

Such a ship would have to be large, requiring a large power plant. The Project Orion concept of propulsion by nuclear pulses has been proposed. The largest spacecraft design analyzed in Project Orion had a 400 m (1,300 ft) diameter and weighed approximately 8 million tons. It could be large enough to host a city of 100,000 or more people.

== Thrust concepts ==
Another concern is selection of power sources and mechanisms which would remain viable for the long time spans involved in interstellar travel through the desert of space. The longest-lived space probes are the Voyager program probes, which use radioisotope thermoelectric generators having a useful lifespan of a mere 50 years.

One propulsion method for a crewed spacecraft could be a fusion microexplosion nuclear pulse propulsion system (like that proposed in Project Daedalus) that may allow it to obtain an interstellar cruising velocity of up to 10% of the speed of light. However, if the ship is capable of transits requiring hundreds of thousands of years, chemical and gravitational slingshot propulsion may be sufficient.

== Specific proposals and research projects ==
The Enzmann starship proposed in 1964 is a large fusion-powered spacecraft that could function as an interstellar ark, supporting a crew of 200 with extra space for expansion, on multi-year journeys at subluminal speeds to nearby star systems.

In 1955 Project Orion considered nuclear propulsion for spacecraft, suitable for deep space voyages.

In 1973–1978 Project Daedalus was conducted by the British Interplanetary Society to study uncrewed interstellar spacecraft.

== See also ==
- Generation ship
