= Non-Stop (novel) =

1958 science fiction novel by Brian Aldiss

- First edition
- Author: Brian Aldiss
- Cover artist: Peter Curl
- Language: English
- Genre: Science fiction
- Publisher: Faber and Faber
- Publication date: 1958
- Publication place: United Kingdom
- Media type: Print (hardback and paperback)
- Pages: 252
- OCLC: 189639078
- Dewey Decimal: 823/.914 22
- LC Class: PR6051.L3 N66 2005

Non-Stop is a 1958 science fiction novel by British writer Brian Aldiss. The book features members of a primitive tribe, who set out on a mission of exploration, and gradually uncover a series of revelations about their world.

== Plot summary ==
The novel's protagonist, Roy Complain, lives in a culturally primitive tribe, which has descended into an uncivilized state. The world is overgrown by vegetation, and the inhabitants have clustered into warring tribes. In Roy's tribe, curiosity is discouraged, and life is solitary, poor, nasty, brutish, and short. With a small group, he leaves his home and ventures into uncharted territory. The consequent discoveries will change his perception of the entire universe.

Complain's small tribe roams nomadically through corridors that are overrun by vegetation. After his wife is kidnapped, a tribal priest, Marapper, encourages Complain to join a furtive expedition into the unexplored corridors. Marapper believes that they are all living on board a moving spacecraft and that if they can reach the control room, they will gain command of the entire gargantuan vessel.

On their journey, the group encounters other tribes of varying levels of sophistication. Complain is also briefly captured by humanoid 'Giants' of legend, who release him with no explanation. Complain's party eventually join the more sophisticated society of the 'Forwards'. There, they learn that the spacecraft is a multi-generational starship returning from a newly colonised planet in the Procyon star system. In a previous generation, the ship's inhabitants had suffered from a pandemic because of an alien amino acid found in the waters of the Procyon planet. Law and order began to collapse, and knowledge of the ship and its purpose was eventually almost entirely lost throughout the vessel. Since the 'Catastrophe', 23 generations have passed so far.

The Forwards have uncertain knowledge of 'Giants', who, though feared, are generally considered to be benevolent. Other mysterious beings, 'Outsiders', are thought to infiltrate the human world from an unknown place and are reviled as enemies. However, when the Giants attack a Forward crew member, the humans conclude that the Giants and Outsiders are colluding against humanity and prepare to retaliate in force. Meanwhile, Complain and his developing romantic interest, Vyann, a Forward officer, learn that the spacecraft should have taken only six generations to return to Earth. Aware that 23 generations have passed since the epidemic, they despairingly deduce that the entire spacecraft is now plummeting into the cold expanse of infinite space. Although they find the ship's control centre, all of its mechanisms have been destroyed.

The Forwards briefly engage the Giants, but the conflict quickly ends. It is then revealed that the ship has been moored outside Earth's atmosphere for a number of years. The 'Giants' are merely normal-sized Earth-humans, who have been attempting to improve the conditions of the ship's inhabitants by slowly repairing the vessel. The 'Outsiders' are unusually short humans from Earth, who have infiltrated the ship's various societies to study the development of their civilization.

The rulers of Earth have been reluctant to integrate the ship-dwellers into Earth's civilization because the epidemic survivors have mutated to live four times faster than Earth's population. However, the recent battle on board the spacecraft has caused it to begin an emergency split into its composite parts, which seems to imply that the entire population must now be granted a new start on Earth.

== Publication History ==
It was the author's first science fiction novel. Originally published by Faber & Faber, it was published in the US by Criterion Books as Starship in 1959. The novel has been frequently republished in the UK and US and translated into French, German, Danish and other languages. The Signet and Avon US paperback editions were also published under the title Starship, but American publishers Carroll & Graf and Overlook Press have used the title Non-Stop.

== Reception ==
Galaxy reviewer Floyd C. Gale gave the novel a mixed review, rating the book 3 1/2 stars out of five and faulting "the shock ending [which] is abrupt and leaves so much unanswered". He later compared the book's "impact to Tumithak".

In 2000, the book was republished as part of the SF Masterworks series. This edition contained some minor revisions by the author.

In 2008 the book was retrospectively awarded the British Science Fiction Association Award for best novel of 1958.

John Clute and David Pringle in The Encyclopedia of Science Fiction praised the novel as "a brilliant treatment of the Generation Starship topos and also the theme of Conceptual Breakthrough".

== See also ==
- 1958 in science fiction
- Generation ship
- Orphans of the Sky by Robert A. Heinlein
- Captive Universe by Harry Harrison
- Metamorphosis Alpha, a role-playing game with many similar elements.
- The Starlost, Canadian television series about a generation ship.
- Pandorum, a movie directed by Christian Alvart, with somewhat similar themes.
