= For the World Is Hollow and I Have Touched the Sky =

- Star Trek: The Original Series episode
- Episode no.: Season 3 Episode 8
- Directed by: Tony Leader
- Written by: Hendrik Vollaerts
- Cinematography by: Al Francis
- Production code: 065
- Original air date: November 8, 1968

Guest appearances
- Kate Woodville – Natira; Byron Morrow – Admiral Westervliet; Jon Lormer – Old Man

Episode chronology
← Previous "Day of the Dove"	Next → "The Tholian Web"
- Star Trek: The Original Series season 3

"For the World is Hollow and I Have Touched the Sky" is the eighth episode of the third season of the American science fiction television series Star Trek. Written by Rik Vollaerts and directed by Tony Leader, it was first broadcast on November 8, 1968.

In the episode, the crew of the Enterprise rush to stop an asteroid from colliding with a Federation world, but discover the asteroid is actually an inhabited generation ship.

== Plot ==
The Federation starship Enterprise is attacked by missiles, which are destroyed, originating from a ship disguised as a large asteroid, which is on a collision course with planet Daran V. Captain Kirk and First Officer Spock beam to the outer portion of ship's interior, disguised as the surface, along with Dr. McCoy, who is suffering from a fatal disease called xenopolycythemia. They are attacked and subdued by a group of humanoids, whose High Priestess, Natira, welcomes them to the "world of Yonada" and orders them to be taken before the "Oracle". This Oracle demonstrates its power by administering a powerful electric shock.

As they recover, an old man approaches them and tells them that he has climbed the mountains of his world and discovered that "the world is hollow and I have touched the sky". He then collapses and dies, and his temple glows red. Natira enters and expresses regret at the man's foolishness. She then gives the three permission to explore Yonada, but asks McCoy to stay with her as her mate. Spock notes that Yonada's writing system resembles that of the Fabrini, a race that was destroyed by a supernova 10,000 years ago. The people of Yonada are evidently their descendants, but are unaware of the nature of their world.

McCoy and Natira have fallen in love, and Natira asks the Oracle for permission to marry McCoy, which the Oracle grants on condition that McCoy accept an "instrument of obedience". Kirk and Spock are then discovered, having secretly entered the Oracle Room. The oracle freezes them in an energy field until Natira has them released. Natira says she must execute them for their transgression, but McCoy persuades her to relent. As Kirk and Spock prepare to return to the Enterprise, McCoy declares his intention to stay behind with Natira.

McCoy marries Natira, and an instrument of obedience is implanted in his temple. Natira shows him their sacred text, the "Book of the People". McCoy suspects it holds the key to setting Yonada back on course, and calls the Enterprise to share this information, which causes his obedience device to be activated. Kirk and Spock transport back to Yonada, and Spock removes the device from McCoy while Kirk tries to explain the truth to Natira. When Natira's own device is activated, McCoy removes it while Kirk and Spock again deal with the Oracle. Spock learns from the Book how to enter the control room behind the Oracle's altar, where they discover the ship's navigational controls and correct Yonada's course. Spock also discovers the Fabrini archives, which contain a cure for McCoy's condition. McCoy returns to the Enterprise where he is successfully treated. Kirk informs McCoy Yonada should reach its new homeworld in approximately 390 days and that the Enterprise could arrange to be there when it happens, suggesting a reunion with Natira might be possible.

== Reception ==
Zack Handlen of The A.V. Club gave the episode a 'B−' rating, describing it as having potential, but being hampered by a script that fails to act on that: "we have Kirk and Spock unraveling the mystery by the halfway mark, and then spending the rest of the episode on clean-up duty. You know McCoy is coming back, you know he'll be cured, and you know that the computer will be defeated. About the only question is whether or not Natira will make it to the end credits, and happily, she does—which means McCoy, unlike Kirk, isn't a widower."

Star Trek novelist Dayton Ward wrote,

"For the World is Hollow and I Have Touched the Sky" is a decent idea, in and of itself. The idea of a generational ship encased in an asteroid is well worth exploring. After all, variations on the concept were already a staple of science fiction long before Star Trek came along. My biggest problem is why someone—the Fabrini—felt it necessary to conceal the truth behind the "worldship" from its population. Wouldn't it make more sense for the generations of Yonadans to be informed as to their purpose, and be working and training the next generation(s) to be ready for when the ship arrives at its destination? Instead, they're wandering the halls, apparently doing little more than tossing Frisbees and getting the occasional spanking from the Oracle. ... The episode is typical of the third season: Long on talk, light on action, adequate yet hardly spectacular in execution.

David Alan Mack, also a Star Trek novelist, remarks on the episode's

peculiar similarity to "The Paradise Syndrome", which aired only five weeks prior. Both episodes involve the Enterprise being tasked with altering the trajectory of an asteroid headed toward a populated Class M planet, discovering a displaced culture with a love of peculiar obelisks, and one of our series regulars getting married to the culture's high priestess. In fact, these episodes are so similar that they reused the effects shot of the asteroid from The Paradise Syndrome as a stand-in for the asteroid-disguised generation ship Yonada.

Mack writes that he "simply didn't buy the romance between McCoy and Natira," but otherwise liked the characterizations:

The episode's performances are quite good, all things considered. William Shatner's scenery chewing is kept in check, and DeForest Kelley brings a quiet dignity to his portrayal of McCoy facing his own imminent demise. The argument between McCoy and Nurse Christine Chapel (Majel Barrett) feels genuine and heartfelt, and Leonard Nimoy brings the perfect degree of quiet compassion to the moment when Spock, having learned of McCoy's illness, reaches out to steady his wounded friend, and McCoy reacts with understated surprise at Spock's sudden display of concern. In fact, that scene is the best one in the entire episode, because it captures the dynamics of the three principals' friendship in a single, eloquently dramatized moment.

Samuel Walters called it "a surprisingly effective episode about blind faith in rules and dogma, as well as a touching love story," with the qualification that the story "does a good job of providing character growth for McCoy. Had the episode not succumbed to an easy solution to his predicament—purely because these episodes need their characters to remain, essentially, the same—then this could have been a profound, moving narrative." A negative review by Michelle Erica Green focused on plot illogic: "Why are the men wearing shiny plaid suits and carrying swords when wrongdoers can be punished for their crimes by a computer? Why are the women wearing provocative gowns when only the priestess is allowed to choose her own mate?"

A 2018 Star Trek binge-watching guide by Den of Geek recommended this episode for featuring the trio of characters Kirk, Spock, and Bones of the original series.

== Home video release ==
"For the World is Hollow and I have Touched the Sky" was released in 1988 on LaserDisc in the United States. It was published by Paramount Home Video, and was released as pair with "The Tholian Web". Star Trek titles were popular on the growing home video market in the 1980s, the Star Trek II film had helped establish the home video market.

This episode was released in Japan on December 21, 1993 as part of the complete season 3 LaserDisc set, Star Trek: Original Series log.3. A trailer for this and the other episodes was also included on an additional disc, and the episode had English and Japanese audio tracks. The cover script was スター・トレック TVサードシーズン for the set.
