= The Voyage That Lasted 600 Years =

Science fiction short story written by Don Wilcox

The Voyage That Lasted 600 Years is a science fiction short story written by Don Wilcox that was first published in Amazing Stories in October 1940. It has been credited as the first fictitious story to be based on the concept of a generational starship.

== Plot ==
The story involves the voyage of the Flashaway on its journey to start a colony on the planet Robinello, which is estimated to require hundreds of years to complete. In order to ensure that the crew remains on-mission, historian Professor Grimstone is placed in hibernation and periodically revived to provide them with important historical information. During his periodic revivals, Grimstone is dismayed to watch the aging crew and eventually, their descendants, slowly forget not only the mission, but everything about America, Earth, and even Robinello. Grimstone's periodic interventions, which sometimes force him to resort to violence to keep the crew in line, manages to keep the ship on-course for nearly 600 years. The Flashaway arrives at Robinello to find it has already been settled by other colonists who arrived in faster ships.

== Reception ==
The underlying concept of a generation ship predates "The Voyage" by some time. Most notably, Konstantin Tsiolkovsky mentions the idea in his 1928 essay, "The Future of Earth and Mankind".

"The Voyage", however, is widely regarded as the first use of the concept in fiction. It was published only shortly before Robert A. Heinlein's much more famous May 1941 "Universe". Both stories are broadly similar, involving a generation ship on which the passengers forget their past and come to see the ship as their original home. Brian Ash suggested that the first fictional treatment of the concept predates Wilcox's story, nothing the appearance of similar concept - but not central to the plot - in Laurence Manning's The Living Galaxy (1934).

The story was also the inspiration for A. E. van Vogt's "Far Centaurus", via John W. Campbell, which is based on the idea of arriving at a now-populated planet. In this case, the story revolves around four men on a sleeper ship, not a generational ship, who learn that their 500-year trip now only takes three hours.
