= Orphans of the Sky =

1963 SF novel by Robert A. Heinlein

- First US edition (publ. G. P. Putnam's Sons, 1964)
- Author: Robert A. Heinlein
- Cover artist: Irv Docktor
- Language: English
- Genre: Science fiction
- Publisher: Victor Gollancz Ltd (UK)
- Publication date: 1941; 1963
- Publication place: United States
- Media type: Print
- ISBN: 9780671318451
- OCLC: 751436515

Orphans of the Sky is a science fiction novel by American writer Robert A. Heinlein, consisting of two parts: the novella "Universe" (originally published in Astounding Science Fiction, May 1941) and its sequel, "Common Sense" (Astounding Science Fiction, October 1941). "Universe" was republished alone in 1951 as a 10¢ Dell paperback book. The two novellas were first published together in book form in 1963. The work presents one of the earliest fictional depictions of a generation ship—an interstellar "ark" travelling at sub-light speeds and requiring many generations to reach a "nearby" star—in this case Proxima Centauri.

"Universe" was selected in 1973 by the Science Fiction Writers of America for inclusion in The Science Fiction Hall of Fame, Volume Two, which collected the most important works published prior to SFWA's founding in 1965.

== Plot summary ==
=== Part I—Universe ===
A brief prologue states that after launching in the year 2119, the Proxima Centauri Expedition, the first attempt at interstellar travel, was lost and its fate remains unknown.

Hugh Hoyland is a young man of insatiable curiosity and energy. His society ("the Crew") inhabit and maintain their home ("the Ship") as a semi-feudal community consisting of two classes. The first are the "Scientists" (really, priests) who maintain both technical and spiritual traditions. The second are the illiterate "peasants" who farm animals and raise crops by hydroponic means. Hugh is selected as an apprentice Scientist. The Scientists ritualistically feed trash (including people) into a mass-to-energy "Converter" to generate power, but remain largely ignorant of its functions. So far as anyone knows, the Ship is the entire universe. The Scientists have access to some ancient texts, produced by their ancestors, which refer to the Ship "moving" and being on a voyage, or "Trip", to a destination known cryptically as "Far Centaurus". But these concepts are interpreted as religious metaphors and literal belief in them is considered heresy. The Crew are ruled by a "Captain", the current one being an obese, nasty incompetent. Crew members occupy the "lower (heavy-weight) decks" and seldom venture to the "upper (low-weight) decks", which are the domain of the barbarous, cannibalistic "muties" (the name is short for "mutants" or "mutineers", no one seems to know which). Several decks in between are uninhabited and considered neutral ground. If any muties (sometimes identifiable by monstrous deformities) are born among the Crew, they are killed at birth.

The 1951 Dell printing of "Universe"

One day, on a hunt for muties, Hugh is captured by them. He barely avoids getting eaten by the microcephalic dwarf Bobo and instead becomes the slave of Joe-Jim Gregory, the two-headed leader of a powerful mutie gang. Joe and Jim have separate identities, but both are highly intelligent and have come to a crude understanding of the Ship's true nature. They take Hugh up to "no-weight" (the axis and core of the Ship) and into the Ship's "Control Room" (a kind of stellarium where a realistic simulation of the outside celestial sphere is projected). Hugh is initially overwhelmed but recovers and later studies ancient texts that were not available to the Crew. After much deliberation he comes to a fuller understanding of the true nature of the Ship than anyone else. It emerges that, after many centuries, the Ship—which is in reality a gigantic, cylindrical starship called the Vanguard—is still cruising without guidance through interstellar space after a mutiny killed most of the officers. The descendants of the survivors then lapsed into a state of superstitious ignorance, having forgotten the purpose and nature of their existence.

Now convinced of the Ship's true purpose, Hugh persuades Joe-Jim to complete the mission of colonization since he notices that there is a nearby star that Joe-Jim has observed growing larger over the years. Intent on the mission, he returns to the lower levels of the Ship to convince others to help him, but is arrested by his former boss, the Chief Engineer Bill Ertz, and sentenced to death. He is viewed as either insane or a previously unrecognized mutant; he was a borderline case at birth, with a head viewed as too large.

Hugh persuades an old friend, Alan Mahoney, to enlist Joe-Jim's gang in rescuing him. He then shows the captured Bill and Alan the long-abandoned Control Room and its view of the stars.

=== Part II—Common Sense ===
Now convinced that the "universe" is much more than just the Ship, Bill enlists the Captain's aide, Commander Phineas Narby, in Hugh's crusade.

Inspired by one of Joe-Jim's favorite books, The Three Musketeers, the friends undergo a "blood brothers" ritual and adopt a "One for All, All for One" ethos. Joe-Jim visits the local knifemaker, a hideous four-armed old woman called "Mother of Blades", and bullies her into manufacturing swords which were previously unknown weapons. (Throwing knives were always the weapons of choice.) When a general assembly of the Crew gets ugly, the blood brothers overthrow the Captain, install Narby in his place, and embark upon a campaign to subdue the many other mutie gangs and bring the entire Ship under their control. This process is quite bloody and takes many months.

Joe-Jim, Hugh and Bobo manage to force their way into abandoned compartments forward of the Control Room that have never been entered in living memory. These "rooms" turn out to be the last one of several auxiliary "boats" intended by the Ship's designers to transport colonists to their new home planet. (The other boats were commandeered by the mutineers long ago.) In this boat, Hugh finds and reads the final entries in the log of the Starship Vanguard (June–October 2172) as the last holdouts among the officers made their last stand against the mutineers, an uprising that was led by the Ship's Metalsmith Roy Huff.

Meanwhile, it turns out, Captain Narby never believed Hugh's interpretation of the Ship or supported his crusade; he has been playing along only to gain power. Once in control, he turns on his blood brothers and sets out to eliminate the muties. Joe is killed in the fighting, but Jim sacrifices himself to hold off their pursuers long enough for Hugh, Bill, Alan, and their wives to escape in the highly automated boat. The small party are awestruck, and mostly uncomprehending, as they see the Ship from the outside for the first time. Hugh, who has been honing his astrogation skills for months, manages to land the small party on the habitable moon of a giant planet orbiting "Far Centaurus". The colonists disembark and experience weather and an open sky for the first time. They soon overcome their vertigo and agoraphobia and uneasily explore the alien surroundings of their new home which include other lifeforms such as trees and animals.

== Reception ==
In 1956, Damon Knight said, "Nobody has ever improved on 'Universe', although a good many reckless people have tried, because Heinlein said it all."

In 1964, Avram Davidson described the newly repackaged Orphans of the Sky as "a modern classic" and praised "the magnitude and magnificence of Orphans' concepts" but expressed disappointment in "the limitations of its conclusion".

In 1966, Algis Budrys said, "Many hands have worked at improving Heinlein's impeccable statement of this theme", with none succeeding until James White's The Watch Below.

In 1973, "Universe" was selected by the Science Fiction Writers of America for inclusion in The Science Fiction Hall of Fame, Volume Two, which collected the most important works published prior to SFWA's founding in 1965.

In 1980, cultural historian and scholar H. Bruce Franklin described "Universe" as

a classic presentation of that critical problem, the impenetrable limits environment places around consciousness, a theme crucial not only for Heinlein and for such science-fiction masterpieces as E. A. Abbott's Flatland, Twain's A Connecticut Yankee in King Arthur's Court and "The Great Dark", Jorge Luis Borges' "The Library of Babel" and Christopher Priest's The Inverted World, but for all modern industrial society as technological and social revolutions constantly change the human environment. In the epistemological laboratory presented by "Universe" neither the traditional beliefs of the present rulers nor the hard-headed pragmatism of a dissident rational bloc who accept only immediate facts can comprehend the stupendous truth of the real universe that lies outside. ... The delusory world of the Ship in "Universe" is presented as a convincing possibility in a rigorously controlled science fiction in which true science offers the only way out.

Franklin dismissed the sequel, "Common Sense", as "more a minor tale of adventure" concluding with a "highly improbable" denouement. He further faulted its "flagrantly derogatory treatment of women".

Wendy Graham reviewed Orphans of the Sky for Adventurer magazine and stated that "It's a familiar tale—the big spaceship with many aboard who've forgotten they're on a ship, until one or two questioning sparks twig the whole thing and they promptly wish they hadn't. If they're lucky, they survive, if not, they're pronounced nutcases and fed to the engines."

== Place in Heinlein's Future History series ==
A reference in "Universe" to Heinlein's Future History series is a passage describing Joe-Jim's enthusiasm for the works of "Rhysling, the blind singer of the spaceways". Rhysling is a poet and the central character of a story, "The Green Hills of Earth", that Heinlein was to publish six years later.

In Heinlein's 1973 novel Time Enough for Love, the Vanguard is briefly mentioned as the sister ship of New Frontiers, which was commandeered by the Howard Families in the 1958 novel Methuselah's Children. It is revealed that the vessel had been bound for Proxima Centauri but never landed colonists there. The Vanguard has been discovered, with its crew long dead because of an unexplained failure in its mechanisms, and its records destroyed or illegible. Its path is traced back, and the descendants of Hugh's people are found, flourishing as highly intelligent savages on a planet which scientists dub "Pitcairn Island" (a reference to the saga of the HMS Bounty).

Although the Starship Vanguard was launched in 2119 according to the story's prologue, the timing of the main events in the story is indicated as being vaguely "centuries" or "generations" later. Heinlein produced at least four Future History timelines over the years (1939, 1941, 1950, 1967). In the 1950 version, he designates "2600" as the timing for "Universe" and "Common Sense"—the very end of the sequence of tales.

== Radio adaptation ==
"Universe" was performed as a radio play on the NBC Radio Network programs Dimension X (on November 26, 1951) and X Minus One (on May 15, 1955). Those versions have several drastic changes to the story, especially in their conclusions in which Hugh is killed, showing the crew of the Vanguard the true nature of the Ship.

== Scientific plausibility ==
The production of "artificial gravity" by way of the centrifugal force of a spinning spacecraft is a common science fiction trope. The depiction of the physics of the Ship's artificial (rotational) gravity is accurate: It spins to simulate gravity, which increases as one moves outward from zero-g at the center. However, such a spacecraft would have to be much larger than, for example, the International Space Station. According to aerospace engineer John Page, "It would have to be very large—much larger than a football field." Heinlein's Starship Vanguard qualifies as large enough. Although the precise dimensions of the Ship are never given in the main text of the book, the original 1941 magazine appearance of "Common Sense" begins with a brief precis of the first half and describes the Ship as "a giant cylinder, five miles long, two thousand feet thick, spinning slowly on its axis". (This precis, being unnecessary, was not included in the book version, but these same dimensions found their way into the blurbs on the backs of some of the subsequent paperback versions.) Heinlein makes nothing of the fact that the "muties" (denizens of the "low-weight" upper decks) would be at a distinct disadvantage maneuvering in the "heavy-weight", lower level decks.

Two-headed humans such as Joe-Jim—known as dicephalic parapagus twins—do exist, and are one variation of conjoined twins. Their dual brains, however, do not alternately share control of the shared body's limbs and other organs (as in the book), but are wired (innervated) separately to the right and left sides of the body respectively.

The Ship's "Converters" are a fictional extrapolation of waste-to-energy technology. They reflect an early 1940s viewpoint of atomic power, with atoms of any element "ripped apart" in an unspecified manner.

The notion of a giant planet with a habitable moon went against theories of planetary formation as they stood before the discovery of "hot Jupiter" planets. It was thought that planets large enough to have an Earth-sized moon would form only above the "snowline", too far from the star for life. It is now believed that such worlds can migrate inwards, and habitable moons seem possible. The existence of exomoons has not been confirmed, but there are candidates.

== See also ==
- The Book of the Long Sun, by Gene Wolfe
- Captive Universe, by Harry Harrison
- "For the World Is Hollow and I Have Touched the Sky", an episode of the original Star Trek with a similar premise
- "If the Stars Should Appear", an episode of science fiction television series The Orville written by Seth MacFarlane and broadcast on September 28, 2017
- Marrow, a novel by American author Robert Reed published in 2000
- Metamorphosis Alpha, a role-playing game by James M. Ward
- "Mission of the Darians", an episode of Space: 1999 with a similar premise
- Non-Stop (novel), by Brian W. Aldiss (titled Starship in its U.S. release)
- "The Oceans Are Wide", a story by Frank M. Robinson about a generation ship whose inhabitants have not forgotten its purpose
- Pandorum, a 2009 German-British science fiction film
- "Proxima Centauri" (short story), by Murray Leinster
- The Starlost, a Canadian-produced science fiction television series devised by writer Harlan Ellison and broadcast in 1973
- Inversion (video game), a 2012 third-person shooter video game set on a generation ship
