= Project Hyperion (interstellar) =

Hypothetical technology

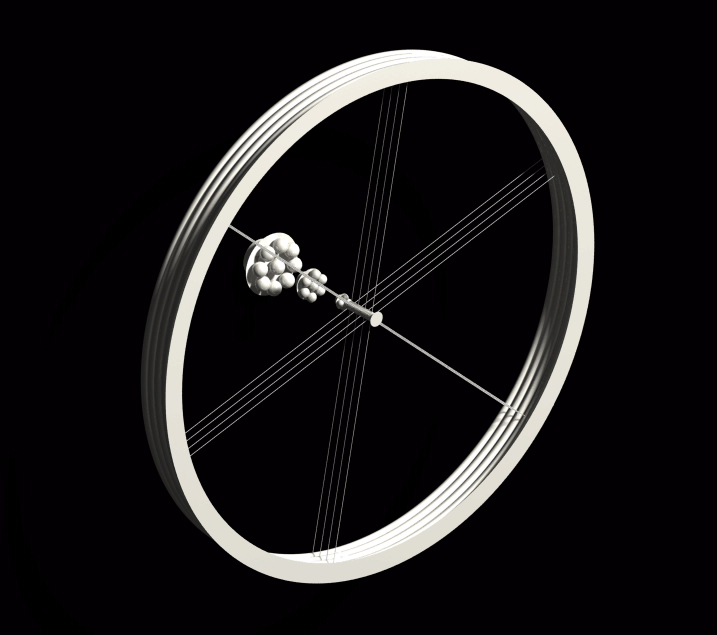
Stanford Torus-based generation ship, proposed by Project Hyperion

Project Hyperion, launched in December 2011 by Andreas M. Hein, is a project aimed at performing a preliminary study to define integrated concepts for a crewed interstellar starship or generation ship. It has led to the most detailed designs of generation ships to date. Its origins can be traced to the WARR student group at the Technical University of Munich (TUM). The study aims to provide an assessment of the feasibility of crewed interstellar flight using current and near-future technologies. It also aims to guide future research and technology development plans as well as to inform the public about crewed interstellar travel.

Notable results of the project include an assessment of world ship system architectures and adequate population size. The project has also been featured in the TV-series Rendezvous with the Future (BBC/Bilibili), popular science books as well as art.

The core team members have transferred to the Initiative for Interstellar Studies's world ship project and have presented their results at the ESA Interstellar Workshop in 2019 as well as in ESA's Acta Futura journal.

An interdisciplinary design competition was launched in 2024. Results were announced in July 2025 with the Italian Chrysalis team in 1st place, the Polish WFP Extreme 2nd, and the Malaysian Systema Stellare Proximum in 3rd place.
