= Starship =

Spacecraft designed for interstellar travel

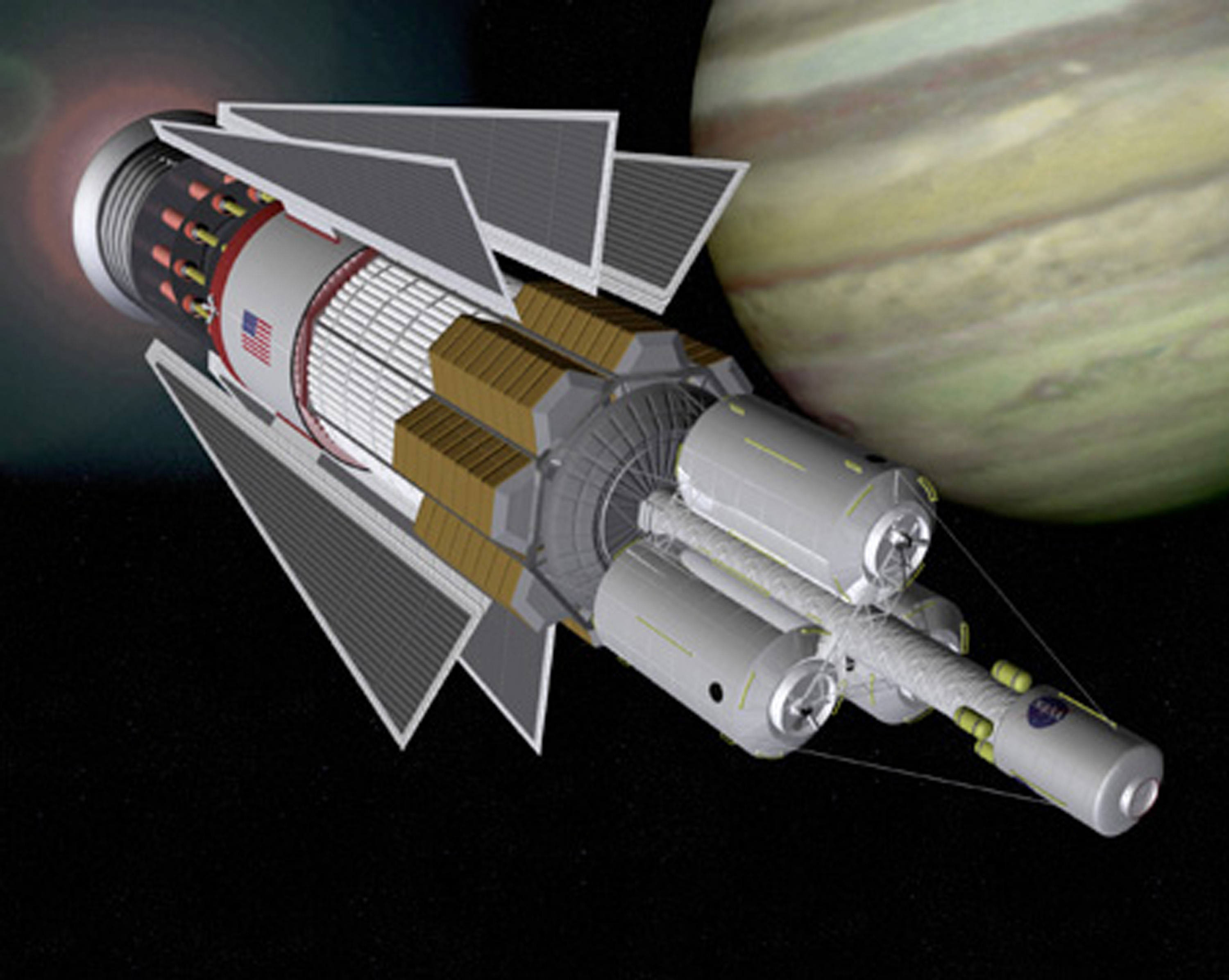
An updated version (NASA, 1999) of the Project Orion by the United States government (1958–1965). It was the earliest scaled project developing a concept for a spaceship with a propulsion, of fission pulses, that was to be capable to transport humans light years within hundreds of years instead of thousands.

A starship, starcraft, or interstellar spacecraft is a theoretical spacecraft designed for traveling between planetary systems. The term is mostly found in science fiction. Reference to a "star-ship" are found as early as 1882 in Oahspe: A New Bible.

While NASA's Voyager and Pioneer probes have traveled into local interstellar space, the purpose of these uncrewed craft was specifically interplanetary, and they are not predicted to reach another star system; Voyager 1 probe and Gliese 445 will pass one another within 1.6 light years in about 40,000 years. Several preliminary designs for starships have been undertaken through exploratory engineering, using feasibility studies with modern technology or technology thought likely to be available in the near future.

In April 2016, scientists announced Breakthrough Starshot, a Breakthrough Initiatives program, to develop a proof-of-concept fleet of small centimeter-sized light sail spacecraft named StarChip, capable of making the journey to Alpha Centauri, the nearest star system, at speeds of 20% and 15% of the speed of light, taking between 20 and 30 years to reach the star system, respectively, and about 4 years to notify Earth of a successful arrival.

== Research ==
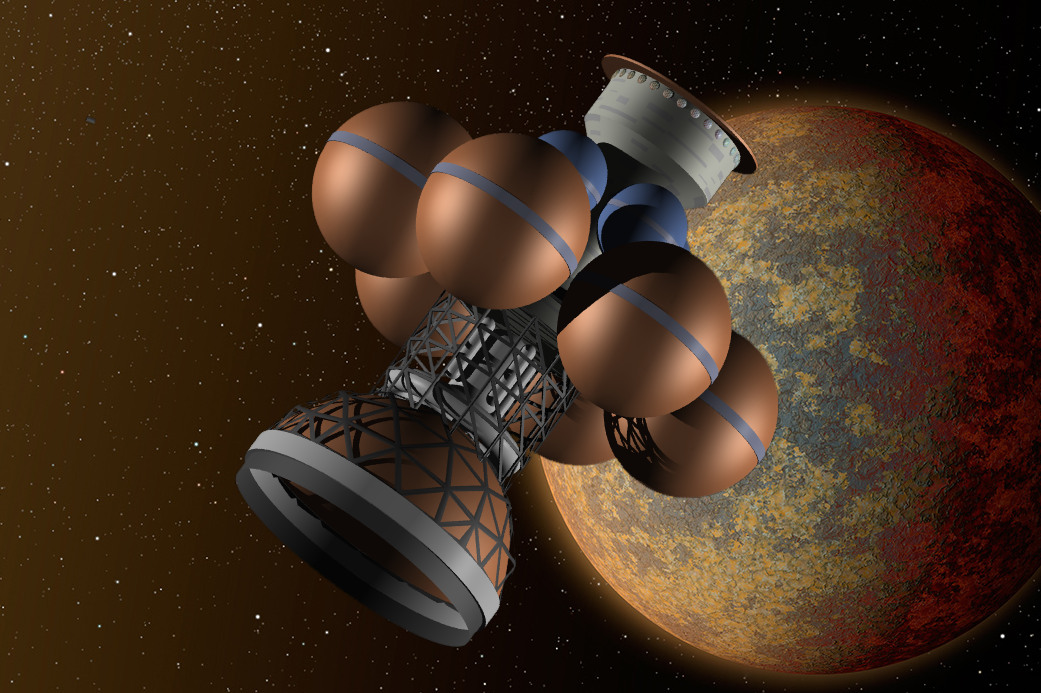
Artist's conception of British Interplanetary Society's Project Daedalus (1978), a fusion powered interstellar probe

To travel between stars in a reasonable time using rocket-like technology requires very high effective exhaust velocity jet and enormous energy to power this, such as might be provided by fusion power or antimatter.

There are very few scientific studies that investigate the issues in building a starship. Some examples of this include:

- Project Orion (1958–1965), mostly crewed interplanetary spacecraft
- Project Daedalus (1973–1978), uncrewed interstellar probe
- Project Longshot (1987–1988), uncrewed interstellar probe
- Project Icarus (2009–2014), uncrewed interstellar probe
- Hundred-Year Starship (2011), crewed interstellar craft

The Bussard ramjet is an idea to use nuclear fusion of interstellar gas to provide propulsion.

Examined in an October 1973 issue of Analog, the Enzmann Starship proposed using a 12,000-ton ball of frozen deuterium to power pulse propulsion units. Twice as long as the Empire State Building is tall and assembled in-orbit, the proposed spacecraft would be part of a larger project preceded by interstellar probes and telescopic observation of target star systems.

The NASA Breakthrough Propulsion Physics Program (1996–2002) was a professional scientific study examining advanced spacecraft propulsion systems.

== Types ==
- Sleeper: Sleeper ships place their occupants into cryostasis or temporal stasis during a long trip. This includes cryonics-based systems that freeze passengers for the duration of the journey. This is a common trope in science fiction, with some notable examples including To Sleep in a Sea of Stars by Christopher Paolini and Edward Bellamy's Looking Backward.
- Generation: Generation ships are ships in which the destination would be reached by descendants of the original passengers. These ships would necessarily be self-sustaining and self-maintaining for possibly thousands of years. Notable examples of this in fiction are the Godspeed in Beth Revis' Across the Universe (and subsequent sequels), as well as the Vanguard from Robert A. Heinlein's Orphans of the Sky.

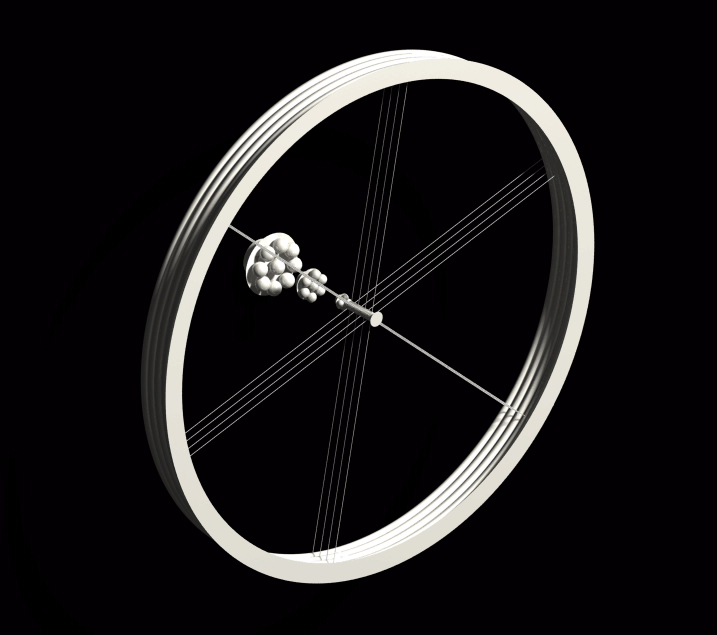
Stanford Torus-based generation ship, proposed by Project Hyperion

- Relativistic: Ships that function by taking advantage of time dilation at close-to-light-speeds, so long trips will seem much shorter (but still take the same amount of time for outside observers).
- Frame shift: Ships that take advantage of the fact that certain dimensions are less "folded" than others, to allow shorter travel by shifting one's frame of reference into a higher, more flat dimension to cut down on travel time, such as in science fiction with inter-dimensional hyperspace. Generally this results in speeds close to (but importantly, not greater than) light speed.
- Faster-than-light (FTL): A ship that functions by reaching a destination faster than the speed of light. While according to the special theory of relativity, faster-than-light travel is impossible, drives like a warp drive or using a wormhole, that is in principle similar have been hypothesized.

=== Theoretical possibilities ===
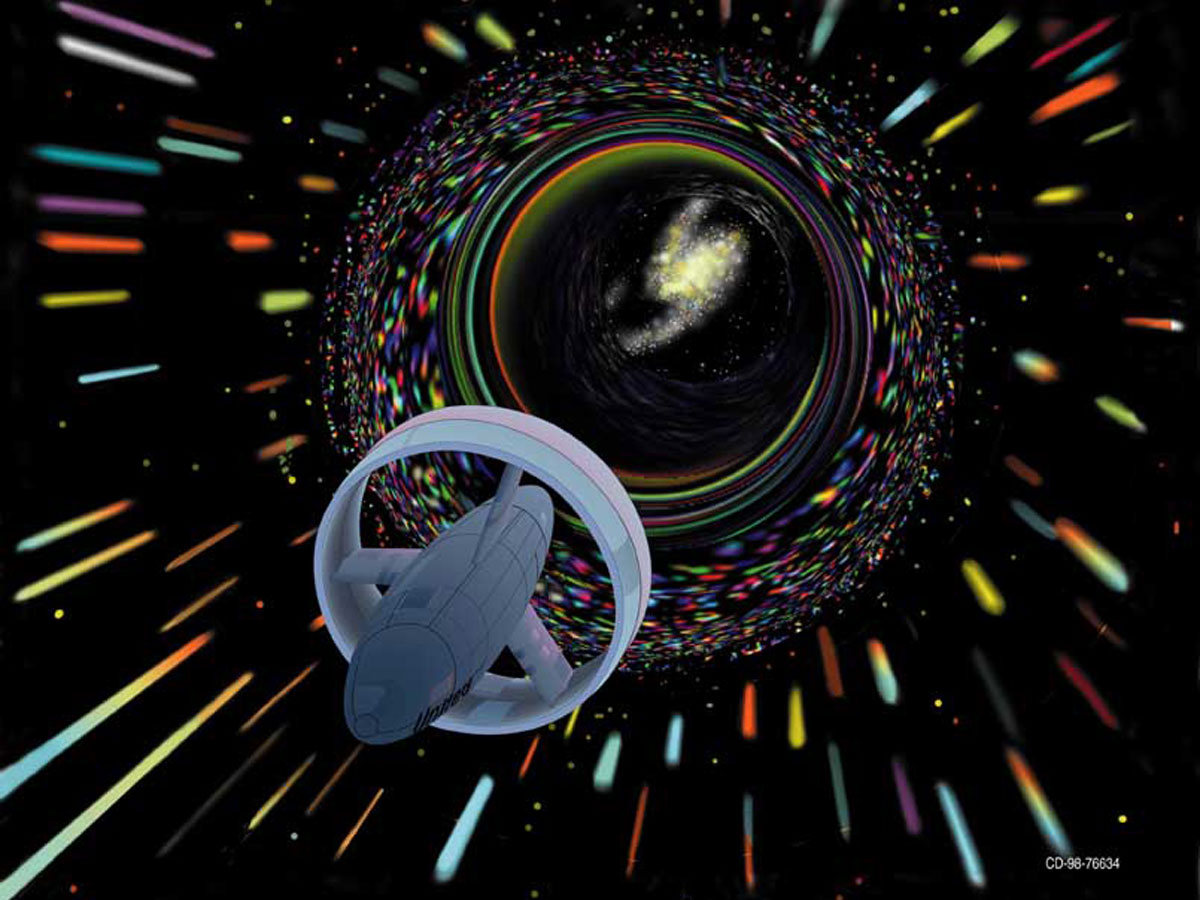
Artist's depiction of a hypothetical Wormhole Induction Propelled Spacecraft, based loosely on the 1994 "warp drive" paper of Miguel Alcubierre

The Alcubierre drive is a speculative warp drive conjectured by Mexican physicist Miguel Alcubierre in a 1994 paper. The paper suggests that space itself could be topographically warped to create a local region of spacetime wherein the region ahead of the "warp bubble" is compressed, allowed to resume normalcy within the bubble, and then rapidly expanded behind the bubble creating an effect that results in apparent FTL travel, all in a manner consistent with the Einstein field equations of general relativity and without the introduction of wormholes. However, the actual construction of such a drive would face other serious theoretical difficulties.

== Fictional examples ==
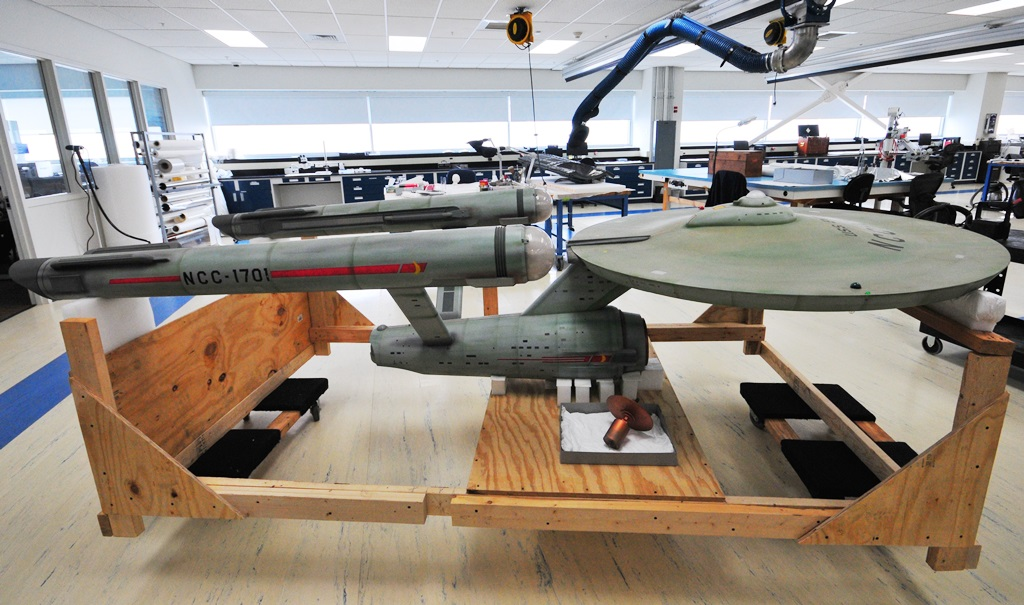
The filming model of the 288.6 metres (947 ft) long starship USS Enterprise (NCC-1701) from the Star Trek: The Original Series television show. The model was donated to the Smithsonian Institution in 1974, where it is on public display.

There are widely known vessels in various science fiction franchises. The most prominent cultural use and one of the earliest common uses of the term starship was in Star Trek: The Original Series.

=== Individual ships ===
(This list is not exhaustive.)

- Axiom (WALL-E)
- Battlestar Galactica (Battlestar Galactica)
- High Charity (Halo Series)
- Hyperion (StarCraft)
- Jupiter 2 (Lost In Space)
- Long Shot (Ringworld)
- Moya (Farscape)
- NSEA Protector (Galaxy Quest)
- SDF-1 Macross (The Super Dimension Fortress Macross)
- SSV Normandy (Mass Effect)
- UNSC Infinity (Halo Series)
- USG Ishimura (Dead Space)
- Yamato (Space Battleship Yamato/Star Blazers)

=== Groups of ships ===
- Spacecraft in Star Trek
  - USS Defiant (Star Trek: Deep Space Nine)
  - USS Discovery
  - USS Enterprise (various)
  - USS Voyager (Star Trek: Voyager)
  - Klingon starships
- Star Wars starships
  - Millennium Falcon
  - Star Destroyers
- M/V Seamus (Archer: 1999)
- The Reapers (Mass Effect)
- USS Callister (USS Callister)

== See also ==
- Fermi Explorer – Proposed interstellar mission non-profit
- Bioship – Type of fictional spacecraft or starship made of biological elements
- Intergalactic travel – Hypothetical travel between galaxies
- IXS Enterprise – Conceptual interstellar ship
- Mother ship – Large vehicle that leads, serves, or carries other smaller vehicles
- Project Icarus (interstellar) – 2009 project to update design of Project Daedalus
- Project Longshot – Spacecraft design
- 100 Year Starship – Grant project to work toward achieving interstellar travel
- Spaceflight – Flight into or through outer space
- Space travel in science fiction – Fictional methods, e.g. antigravity, hyperdrive
- Starship Technologies – Company developing small self-driving robotic delivery vehicles
- Unidentified flying object – Apparent unusual observation in the sky
