= Generation ship =

Starship inhabited for multiple generations

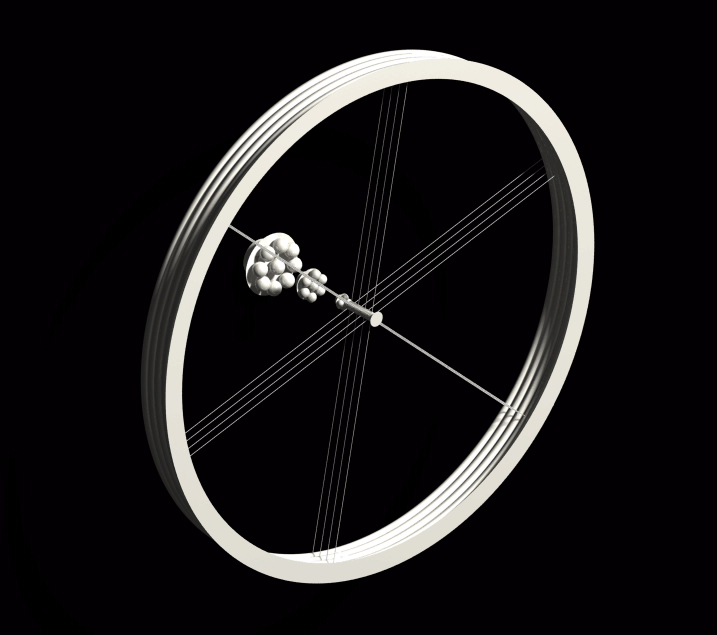
Stanford torus–based generation ship, proposed by Project Hyperion

A generation ship, generation starship, or world ship is a hypothetical type of interstellar ark, a multi-generational space habitat and starship.

It is a design to allow travel times of hundreds to thousands of years to reach nearby stars. The original occupants of a generation ship would grow old and die, leaving their descendants to continue traveling.

== History ==
=== Origins ===
Rocket pioneer Robert H. Goddard was the first to write about long-duration interstellar journeys in his "The Ultimate Migration" (1918). In this, he described the death of the Sun and the necessity of an "interstellar ark". The crew would travel for centuries in suspended animation and be awakened when they reached another star system. He proposed to use small moons or asteroids as ships, and speculated that the crew would endure psychological and genetic changes over the generations.

Konstantin Tsiolkovsky, considered a father of astronautic theory, first described the need for multiple generations of passengers in his essay, "The Future of Earth and Mankind" (1928), outlining a space colony equipped with engines that travels thousands of years which he called "Noah's Ark". In the story, the crew had changed so much over the generations at so many levels that they did not even acknowledge Earth as their home planet.

Another early description of a generation ship is in the 1929 essay "The World, the Flesh, & the Devil" by John Desmond Bernal. Bernal's essay was the first publication to reach the public and influence other writers. He wrote about the concept of human evolution and mankind's future in space through methods of living that we now describe as a generation starship, and which could be seen in the generic word "globes".

=== World Ships – Architectures & Feasibility Revisited paper ===
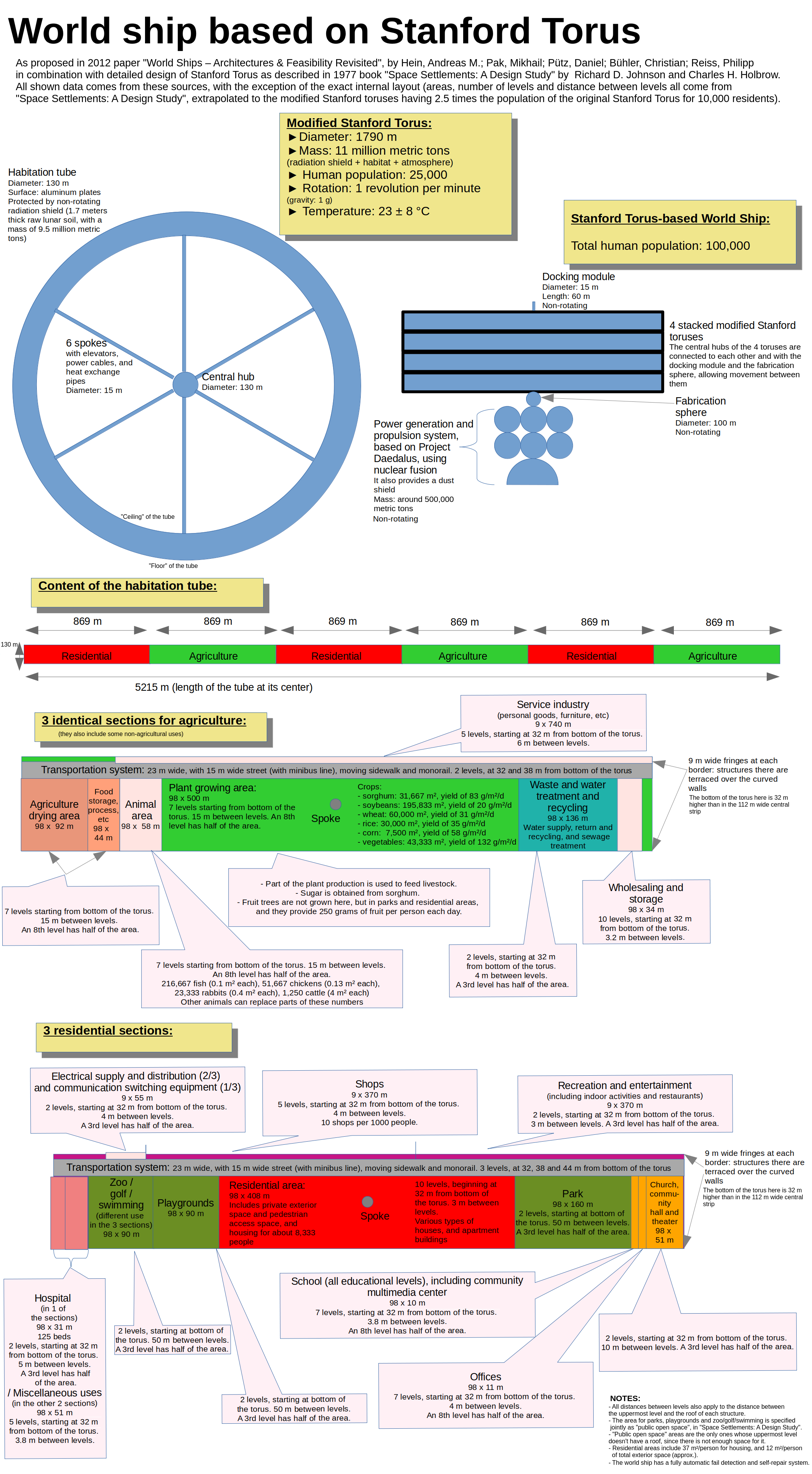
Diagram of the world ship described in World Ships – Architectures & Feasibility Revisited paper, also considering the detailed design of Stanford Torus as described in Space Settlements: A Design Study book

The 2012 paper World Ships – Architectures & Feasibility Revisited differentiated several types of interstellar spacecraft: those with a population bigger than 100,000 are called world ships, while those with a population between 1,000 and 100,000 are called colony ships. Interstellar spacecraft with a population below 1,000 are called sprinter if their cruise velocity is bigger than 10% of c, and slow boat if smaller.

The paper also described a proposed world ship, having the minimal population to be considered as such (100,000), and consisting of 4 stacked Stanford torus colonies (with some changes from the original, such as having 2.5 times its population, and a 10% bigger mass), and a propulsion and power generation system based on Project Daedalus. The Stanford torus was chosen because of its detailed design, that covers in-depth aspects such as life support systems and wall thickness.

The study also concluded that a world ship would need an automatic fail detection and self-repair system, to be reliable enough for its mission, preventing failures from having catastrophic effects.

=== Project Hyperion ===
Project Hyperion, launched in December 2011 by Andreas M. Hein, intends to perform a preliminary study that defines integrated concepts for a crewed interstellar generation ship. It has led to the most detailed designs of generation ships to date. The project is associated with the Initiative for Interstellar Studies and has its origins with the WARR student group at the Technical University of Munich. The study aims to assess the feasibility of crewed interstellar flight using current and near-future technologies. It also aims to guide future research and technology development plans as well as to inform the public about crewed interstellar travel. Notable results of the project include an assessment of world ship system architectures and adequate population size. A survey paper on generation ships has been presented at the ESA Interstellar Workshop in 2019 as well as in ESA's Acta Futura journal. An interdisciplinary design competition was launched in 2024. Results were announced in July 2025 with the Italian Chrysalis team on the 1st place, the Polish WFP Extreme 2nd, and the Malaysian Systema Stellare Proximum on 3rd place.

== Definition ==
According to Hein et al., a "generation ship" is a spacecraft on which a crew is living on board for at least several decades, such that it comprises multiple generations. Several sub-categories of generation ships are distinguished: sprinter, slow boat, colony ship, world ship. The Enzmann starship is categorized as a "slow boat" because of the Astronomy Magazine title "Slow Boat to Centauri" (1977). Gregory Matloff's concept is called a "colony ship" and Alan Bond called his concept a "world ship". These definitions are essentially based on the velocity of the ship and population size.

== Obstacles ==
=== Destination ===
The first generation ships need to balance high cost with the uncertain probability that a destination star system is sufficiently hospitable.

=== Biosphere ===
Such a ship would have to be entirely self-sustaining, providing life support for everyone aboard. It must have extraordinarily reliable systems that could be maintained by the ship's inhabitants over long periods of time. This would require testing whether thousands of humans could survive on their own before sending them beyond the reach of help. Small artificial closed ecosystems, such as Biosphere 2, have been built in an attempt to examine the engineering challenges of such a system, with mixed results.

=== Biology and society ===
Generation ships would have to anticipate possible biological, social, and morale problems, and would also need to deal with matters of self-worth and purpose for the various crews involved.

Estimates of the minimum reasonable population for a generation ship vary. Anthropologist John Moore has estimated that, without genetic testing of people before boarding the ship, social control and / or social engineering (such as requiring people to wait until their thirties to have children), nor cryopreservation of eggs, sperm, or embryos (as is done in sperm banks), a minimum of 160 people boarding the ship would allow normal family life (with the average individual having ten potential marriage partners) throughout a 200-year space journey, with little loss of genetic diversity. If the people who board the ship are couples, presumably in their early twenties, and everybody who lives in the ship is required to wait until their mid to late thirties before having children, then the minimum would be just 80 people. However, many variables are not accounted for in the estimate, including the higher chance of health problems for both the woman who is pregnant and the fetus or baby because of the pregnant woman's age. In 2013, anthropologist Cameron Smith reviewed existing literature and created a new computer model to estimate a minimum reasonable population in the tens of thousands. Smith's numbers were much larger than previous estimates such as Moore's, in part because Smith takes the risk of accidents and disease into consideration, and assumes at least one severe population catastrophe over the course of a 150-year journey.

In light of the multiple generations that it could take to reach even our nearest neighboring star systems such as Proxima Centauri, further issues on the viability of such interstellar arks include:

- the possibility of humans dramatically evolving in directions unacceptable to the sponsors
- the minimum population required to maintain in isolation a culture acceptable to the sponsors; this could include such aspects as
  - ability to learn scientific and technical skills needed to maintain, operate, and pilot the ship
  - ability to accomplish the purpose (planetary colonization, research, building new interstellar arks) contemplated
  - sharing the values of the sponsors, which may not be likely to be empirically demonstrated to be viable beyond the home planet unless, once the ship is away from Earth and on its way, survival of one's offspring until the ship reaches the target star is one motivation.

=== Size ===
For a spacecraft to maintain a stable environment for multiple generations, it would have to be large enough to support a community of humans and a fully recycling ecosystem. A spacecraft of such a size would require much energy to accelerate and decelerate. A smaller spacecraft, being able to accelerate more easily and thus make higher cruise velocities more practical, would reduce exposure to cosmic radiation and the time for malfunctions to develop in the craft, but would have challenges with resource metabolic flow and ecologic balance.

=== Social breakdown ===
Generation ships traveling for long periods of time may see breakdowns in social structures. Changes in society (for example, mutiny) could occur over such periods and may prevent the ship from reaching its destination. This state was described by Algis Budrys in a 1966 book review:

The slower-than-light interstellar spaceship, pursuing its way through the weary centuries, its crew losing touch with all reality save the interior of the vessel ... Well, you know the story, and its unhappy downhill round, its exciting struggles between the barbarian tribes which develop in its disparate compartments, and then, if the writer is so minded, the ultimate flash of hope as the good guys win out and prepare to meet their future on some noble, if erroneous basis.

Robert A. Heinlein's Orphans of the Sky (the "impeccable statement of this theme", Budrys said) and Brian Aldiss's Non-Stop (U.S. title: Starship) discussed such societies.

=== Cosmic rays ===
The radiation environment of deep space is very different from that on the Earth's surface, or in low Earth orbit, due to the much larger influx of high-energy galactic cosmic rays (GCRs). Like other ionizing radiation, high-energy cosmic rays can damage DNA and increase the risk of cancer, cataracts, and neurological disorders.

== Ethical considerations ==
The success of a generation ship depends on children born aboard taking over the necessary duties, as well as having children themselves. Even if their quality of life might be better than, for example, that of people born into poverty on Earth, philosophy professor Neil Levy has raised the question of whether it is ethical to severely constrain life choices of individuals by locking them into a project they did not choose. A moral quandary exists regarding how intermediate generations, those destined to be born and die in transit without actually seeing tangible results of their efforts, might feel about their forced existence on such a ship.

== Generation ships in fiction ==
Generation ships are a recurring theme in science fiction, particularly in stories exploring the social and cultural changes that might occur during centuries of isolated space travel. A common premise involves descendants of the original crew losing knowledge of their origins and the purpose of their journey, sometimes developing new religions and social hierarchies within the spacecraft, which they may regard as the entirety of their world.

An early anticipation of the theme appears in Murray Leinster's short story "Proxima Centauri" (1935), which depicts a spacecraft carrying families whose descendants could potentially sustain a voyage lasting thousands of years, although the journey described takes only seven years. According to The Encyclopedia of Science Fiction, probably the first fully developed treatment of a multigenerational voyage in genre science fiction was Don Wilcox's "The Voyage That Lasted 600 Years" (1940). In this story, an observer periodically awakens from hibernation to discover the changing societies of the crew's descendants, including the emergence of superstition and social degeneration.

A particularly influential depiction appeared in Robert A. Heinlein's stories "Universe" and "Common Sense" (both 1941), subsequently collected as the novel Orphans of the Sky (1963). The inhabitants have forgotten that they live aboard a spacecraft and have developed a stratified society based on superstitious beliefs; the protagonist's discovery of the ship's true nature provides the central revelation. Brian Aldiss revisited this premise in his novel Non-Stop (1958), which had first appeared in a shorter form in 1956. Such narratives frequently use the discovery of the vessel's true nature as a conceptual breakthrough and a turning point in the protagonist's development.

Other works explore different forms of social adaptation aboard generation ships. Clifford D. Simak's "Spacebred Generations" (1953) portrays inhabitants who have ceased to understand the nature of their surroundings, while John Brunner's "Lungfish" (1957) depicts passengers who have become so attached to their spacecraft that they resist leaving it upon arrival. In Captive Universe (1969), Harry Harrison portrays a shipboard population deliberately reorganized into societies resembling medieval monks and Aztec peasants. Later examples include Gene Wolfe's four-volume series The Book of the Long Sun (1993–1996), set largely aboard the generation ship Whorl, and Ken MacLeod's Learning the World (2005), which departs from the traditional lost-knowledge premise by portraying descendants who retain access to information about their origins and mission.

The motif also appeared in non-English literature. An early example from Polish science fiction was the spacecraft Celestia in Zagubiona przyszłość (1953–1954) by Krzysztof Boruń and Andrzej Trepka. Another example is Marek Oramus's novel Senni zwycięzcy (1982).

On television, the concept was central to the Canadian series The Starlost (1973), developed from a screenplay by Harlan Ellison. Its inhabitants live in isolated communities aboard a generation ship, unaware of their spacecraft's true nature.

== See also ==
- Aniara
- Artificial planet
- Autarky
- Embryo space colonization
- Interstellar cycler
- O'Neill cylinder
- Self-replicating spacecraft
- Sleeper ship
