= The Starlost =

Science fiction television series

- Title card
- Genre: Science fiction Drama
- Created by: Harlan Ellison (as Cordwainer Bird)
- Written by: Harlan Ellison (as Cordwainer Bird); George Ghent; Norman Klenman; Martin Lager
- Directed by: Harvey Hart; Martin Lager; George McCowan; Leo Orenstein; Ed Richardson; Joseph L. Scanlan
- Starring: Keir Dullea; Gay Rowan; Robin Ward
- Country of origin: Canada
- Original language: English
- No. of seasons: 1
- No. of episodes: 16

Production
- Executive producers: William Davidson; Gerry Rochon; Douglas Trumbull; Jerome M. Zeitman
- Producers: William Davidson; Ed Richardson; Gerry Rochon; Douglas Trumbull; Jerome M. Zeitman
- Editors: Bernie Clayton; Gordon Stoddard
- Camera setup: Single-camera
- Running time: 50 mins.
- Production companies: 20th Century-Fox Television; CTV Television Network; Glen Warren Productions

Original release
- Network: CTV
- Release: September 22, 1973 – January 5, 1974

The Starlost is a Canadian-produced science fiction television series created by writer Harlan Ellison and broadcast in 1973 on CTV in Canada and syndicated to local stations in the United States. The show's setting is a huge generational colony spacecraft called Earthship Ark which, following an unspecified accident, has gone off course. Centuries after its original launch however, most of the descendants of the original crew and colonists are unaware that they are even aboard a spaceship. The series experienced a number of production difficulties, and Ellison broke with the project before the airing of its first episode.

== Premise ==
Foreseeing the destruction of Earth, humanity builds a multi-generational starship called Earthship Ark, 50 miles (80 km) wide and 200 miles (320 km) long. The ship contains dozens of biospheres, each kilometres across and housing people of different cultures. Their goal is to find and seed a new world of a distant star. In 2385, more than 100 years into the voyage, an unexplained accident occurs, and the ship goes into emergency mode in which each biosphere is sealed off from the others.

In 2790, 405 years after the accident, Devon (Keir Dullea) a resident of Cypress Corners, an agrarian community with a culture resembling that of the Amish, discovers that his world is far larger and more mysterious than he had realized. Considered an outcast because of his questioning of the way things are, especially his refusal to accept the arranged marriage of his love Rachel (Gay Rowan) to his friend Garth (Robin Ward), Devon finds out that the Cypress Corners elders have been deliberately manipulating the local computer terminal, which they call "The Voice of The Creator". The congregation pursues Devon for attacking the elders and stealing a computer cassette on which they have recorded their orders, and its leaders plot to execute him, but the elderly Abraham, who also questions the elders, gives Devon a key to a dark mysterious doorway, which Abraham himself is afraid to enter. The frightened Devon escapes into the service areas of the ship and accesses a computer data station, which explains the nature and the purpose of the Ark and hints at its problems.

When Devon returns to Cypress Corners to tell his community what he has learned, he is put on trial for heresy and condemned to death by stoning. Escaping on the night before his execution with the aid of Garth, Devon convinces Rachel to come with him, and Garth pursues them. When Rachel refuses to return with Garth, he joins her and Devon. Eventually they make their way to the ship's bridge, containing the skeletal remains of its crew. It is badly damaged, and its control systems are inoperative. The three discover that the Ark is on a collision course with a Class G star similar to the Sun and realize that the only way to save the Ark and its passengers is to find the backup bridge at the other end of the Ark and to reactivate the navigation and propulsion systems.

Getting to the other end of the Ark, which is potentially hundreds of miles away, involves traveling through the many disparate communities on the starship, some of which are hostile to outsiders, and all of which have different social customs, belief systems and law enforcement practices. Generally, each episode will have Devon, Rachel, and Garth encountering a new society or group as they work their way through the ship. Occasionally, they are aided (or hindered) in their travels by the ship's frustrating and only partially-functioning computer system interface, known as Mu Lambda 165 (portrayed by William Osler, who also provided the opening narration for each episode).

== Development and production ==
20th Century Fox was involved in the project with Douglas Trumbull as executive producer. The science fiction writer and editor Ben Bova was brought in as science advisor.

Harlan Ellison was approached by Robert Kline, a 20th Century Fox television producer, to come up with an idea for a science fiction TV series consisting of eight episodes, to pitch to the BBC as a co-production in February 1973. The BBC rejected the idea. Unable to sell The Starlost for prime time, Kline decided to pursue a low budget approach and produce it for syndication. By May, Kline had sold the idea to 48 NBC stations and the Canadian CTV network.

Ellison claimed that to get Canadian government subsidies, the production was shot in Canada, and Canadian writers produced the scripts from story outlines by Ellison. However, several produced episodes were written entirely by American writers.

Before Ellison could begin work on the show's production bible, a writers' strike began, running from March 6 to June 24. Kline negotiated an exception with the Writer's Guild, on the grounds that the production was wholly Canadian – and Ellison went to work on a bible for the series.

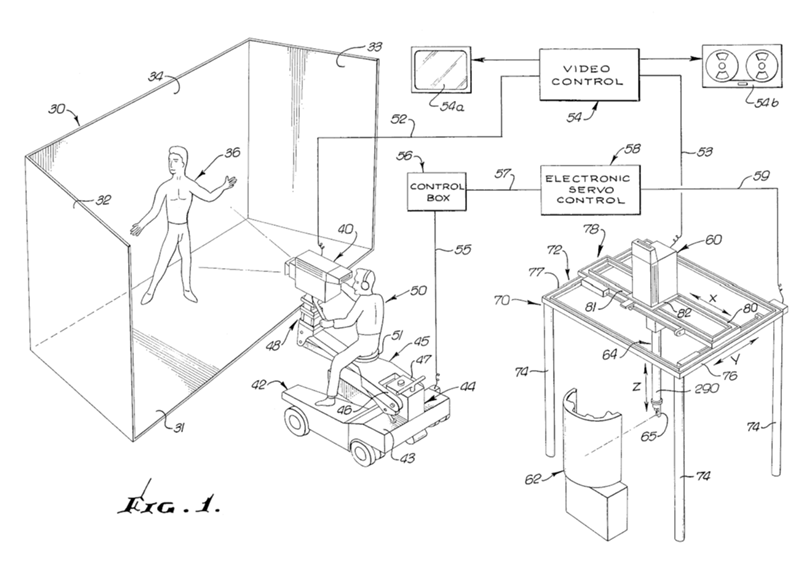
A drawing from the Magicam patent showing the basic arrangement of the system - a servo controlled dolly along with a secondary periscope camera filming a model background

Originally, the show was to be filmed with a special effects camera system developed by Trumbull called Magicam. The system comprises two cameras, the motion of which are controlled by servos. One camera films actors against a blue screen, and the other shoots a model background. The motion of both cameras is synchronized and scaled appropriately, allowing both the camera and the actors to move through model sets. The technology did not work reliably, however. In the end, simple blue screen effects were used, which forced static camera shots.

The failure of the Magicam system was a major blow, as the Canadian studio space that had been rented was too small to build the required sets. In the end, partial sets were built, but the lack of space hampered production.

As the filming went on, Ellison grew disenchanted with the budget cuts, details that were changed, and what he characterized as a progressive dumbing down of the story. Ellison's dissatisfaction extended to the new title of the pilot episode; he had titled it "Phoenix Without Ashes" but it was changed to "Voyage of Discovery".

Before the production of the pilot episode was completed, Ellison invoked a clause in his contract to force the producers to use his alternative registered writer's name of "Cordwainer Bird" on the end credits.

Sixteen episodes were made. Fox decided not to pick up the options for the remainder of the series.

== Reception and impact ==
On March 31, 1974, Ellison received a Writers Guild of America Award for Best Original Screenplay for the original script (the pilot script as originally written, not the version that was filmed). A novelization of the script by Edward Bryant, Phoenix Without Ashes, was published in 1975 and contains a lengthy foreword by Ellison describing what had gone on in production. In 2010, the novel was adapted into comic book form by IDW Publishing.

Ben Bova, in an editorial in Analog Science Fiction (June 1974) and in interviews in fanzines, made it clear how disgruntled he had been as science adviser. In 1975, he published a novel entitled The Starcrossed, depicting a scientist taken on as a science adviser for a terrible science fiction series.

From contemporary reviews, Michael Walsh in The Province commented on the first episode, writing that he found the model work on the show impressive while concluding it was "written, directed, acted, lit, photographed, recorded and edited like a church basement production".

The Starlost has received a generally negative reception from historians of science fiction television: The Encyclopedia of Science Fiction described The Starlost as "dire", while The Best of Science Fiction TV included The Starlost in its list of the "Worst Science Fiction Shows of All Time".

== Episodes ==
No. in season	Title	Written by	Original release date
1	"The Beginning" "Voyage of Discovery"	Cordwainer Bird	September 22, 1973
Devon discovers his people live on a huge spacecraft and is sentenced to death for heresy when he states this. He escapes, and his betrothed Rachel and friend Garth follow him on his journey.
2	"Lazarus from the Mist"	Douglas Hall and Don Wallace	September 29, 1973
While Garth is held by "cavemen" descendants of the service crew, Devon and Rachel awaken one of the ship's engineers from suspended animation to help repair the Ark.
3	"The Goddess Calabra"	Martin Lager from a story by Ursula K. Le Guin	October 6, 1973
The trio visit a biosphere populated only by men, whose governor desires to marry Rachel, who resembles a goddess worshipped in the community.
4	"The Pisces" "The Return"	Norman Klenman	October 13, 1973
An exploratory vessel returns after a 10-year journey, but due to time dilation, 400 years have passed since its departure.
5	"Children of Methuselah"	Jonah Royston and George Ghent from a story by Jonah Royston	October 20, 1973
Thinking they have found the backup bridge of the Ark, the trio discover a module occupied by children who believe that they have been piloting the Ark since it left Earth.
6	"And Only Man Is Vile"	Shimon Wincelberg	October 27, 1973
A scientist intent on breeding a hardier race of humans tries to prove that man is too selfish.
7	"The Alien Oro"	Mort Forer and Marion Waldman	November 3, 1973
An alien sent on a reconnaissance mission has crashed into the Ark and is now harvesting parts to repair his ship to return home; Garth falls for a woman who must leave with Oro in order to survive.
8	"Circuit of Death"	Norman Klenman	November 10, 1973
A disillusioned man triggers the self-destruction of the Ark but intends to escape; he and Devon must undergo miniaturization to stop the detonation.
9	"Gallery of Fear"	Alfred Harris and George Ghent from a story by Alfred Harris	November 17, 1973
A computer desires to become autonomous and tricks the trio into completing its programming.
10	"Mr. Smith of Manchester"	Arthur Heinemann and Norman Klenman from a story by Arthur Heinemann	November 24, 1973
The trio find their way past a mysterious high-security biosphere entrance and discover a distrusting, power-mad ruler who tries to assure them of his peaceful intentions while he pollutes his city to produce armaments.
11	"Astro-Medics"	Paul Schnieder and Martin Lager	December 1, 1973
After Devon is injured by radiation, a medical ship that orbits the Ark comes to his aid, but the doctor who can help him is too intrigued by the possibility of helping aliens who have signaled for help.
12	"The Implant People"	Helen French and Martin Lager	December 8, 1973
The trio visit a biosphere where a despotic servant to the leader terrorizes the population with pain produced from mandatory implants.
13	"The Return of Oro"	Alex C. James	December 15, 1973
Oro returns... as commander of Earthship Ark. He tells the trio and their temporary companion that his home world can support the people from Earth, but Devon discovers otherwise when a robot is asked the correct questions.
14	"Farthing's Comet"	Douglas Hall	December 22, 1973
A scientist alters the Ark's course to pass through a comet's tail so he can study it; Devon must make an EVA to rewire a panel so the service reactors can be fired again; cometary debris damages the biospheres.
15	"The Beehive"	Norman Klenman	December 29, 1973
The trio visit a science installation where a scientist has bred giant mutant bees.
16	"Space Precinct"	Martin Lager	January 5, 1974
Garth decides to return to Cypress Corners, but he is recruited into the inter-ark police force by an officer intending to take a flight to assist in resolving an interplanetary conflict.

The Starlog Photo Guidebook TV Episode Guides Volume 1 (1981) lists two unfilmed episodes, "God That Died" and "People in the Dark." The latter episode, written by George Salverson, follows Devon, Rachel, and Garth as they discover a dome in which people have been living in the dark since the accident to the Ark.

Episodes of the original series were rebroadcast in 1978 and further in 1982. A number of episodes were also edited together to create movie-length installments that were sold to cable television broadcasters in the late 1980s.

Movie	Episodes
The Starlost: The Beginning	"Voyage of Discovery" and "The Goddess Calabra"
The Starlost: The Return	"The Pisces" and "Farthing's Comet"
The Starlost: Deception	"Mr. Smith of Manchester" and "Gallery of Fear"
The Starlost: The Alien Oro	"The Alien Oro" and "The Return of Oro"
The Starlost: The Invasion	"Astro-Medics" and "The Implant People"

== Commercial releases ==
All 16 episodes were at one time available in a VHS boxed set.

The first DVD release was limited to the five feature-length edited versions.

In September/October 2008, the full series was released on DVD by VCI Entertainment. Aside from the digitally remastered episodes, a "presentation reel" created for potential broadcasters is also included. Hosted by Dullea and Trumbull, and predating Ellison's departure as he is credited under his own name with creating the series, the short feature includes sample footage using the later-abandoned Magicam technology, some filmed special effects footage taken from other productions along with model footage from the film Silent Running to represent the Earthship Ark concept, and a different series logo.

In early 2019, a Roku channel began airing The Starlost as its only program.

== Cast ==
- Keir Dullea as Devon
- Gay Rowan as Rachel
- Robin Ward as Garth
- William Osler as the voice and image of Mu Lambda 165 (a.k.a. Host Computer)

== Notable guest stars ==
- Sterling Hayden as Jeremiah
- Frank Converse as Dr. Gerald W. Aaron
- John Colicos as Governor
- Barry Morse as Shaliff
- Lloyd Bochner as Colonel M. P. Garroway
- Diana Barrington as Captain Janice
- Simon Oakland as Dr. Asgard
- Percy Rodriguez as I. A. Richards
- Angel Tompkins as Daphne
- Ed Ames as President Mr. Smith
- Alexandra Bastedo as Egreck 419B2 Idona
- Walter Koenig as Oro of planet Xar
- Antoinette Bower as Dr. Heather Marshall

== See also ==
Similar themes:

- The Ark – television series in which a human colony ship carrying colonists in suspended animation is sent to a nearby star system from a dying 22nd century Earth. The colonists wake up after the ship's primary command crew was killed in an unknown disaster whilst en route. The series debuted on SYFY/Peacock in February, 2023.
- Space: 1999 – television series in which Earth's entire moon, with over 300 people inhabiting Moonbase Alpha, gets knocked out of orbit, sending it hurtling uncontrollably into space.
- Tau Zero – a novel in which, due to damage, a colonization vessel crewed by 25 men and 25 women has to abandon its original goal and travel ever farther. Time dilation makes it impossible for the ship to return to Earth.
