= Dig Allen Space Explorer =

Science fiction series by Joseph Greene

Dig Allen Space Explorer is a series of six science-fiction novels (1959–1962) by American author Joseph Greene. Much like Greene's earlier creation, Tom Corbett, Space Cadet, the series chronicles the adventures of a group of intrepid adolescent boys, led by boy hero Digby "Dig" Allen. The setting centers on the asteroid Eros, which is discovered to be an immense alien spacecraft. In every installment, the boys embark upon interplanetary voyages around the Solar System that are set against nefarious schemes from a variety of adversaries.

The Dig Allen Space Explorer series consists of:

1. The Forgotten Star (1959)
2. Captives in Space (1960)
3. Journey to Jupiter (1961)
4. Trappers of Venus (1961)
5. Robots of Saturn (1962)
6. Lost City of Uranus (1962)
