= Farmer in the Sky =

1950 novel by Robert A. Heinlein

- First edition cover
- Author: Robert A. Heinlein
- Cover artist: Clifford Geary
- Language: English
- Series: Heinlein juveniles
- Genre: Science fiction
- Publisher: Charles Scribner's Sons
- Publication date: 1950
- Publication place: United States
- ISBN: 0-345-32438-2
- Preceded by: Red Planet
- Followed by: Between Planets

Farmer In The Sky is a 1950 science fiction novel by American writer Robert A. Heinlein about a teenaged boy who emigrates with his family to Jupiter's moon Ganymede, which is in the process of being terraformed. Among Heinlein's juveniles, a condensed version of the novel was published in serial form in Boys' Life magazine (August, September, October, November 1950), under the title "Satellite Scout". The novel was awarded a Retro Hugo in 2001.

Passing references by the lead character to the song "The Green Hills of Earth" and to its author, Rhysling, have caused some to consider it part of Heinlein's Future History series. There are references to the "Space Patrol", the interplanetary peace-keeping organization described in Space Cadet.

== Plot summary ==
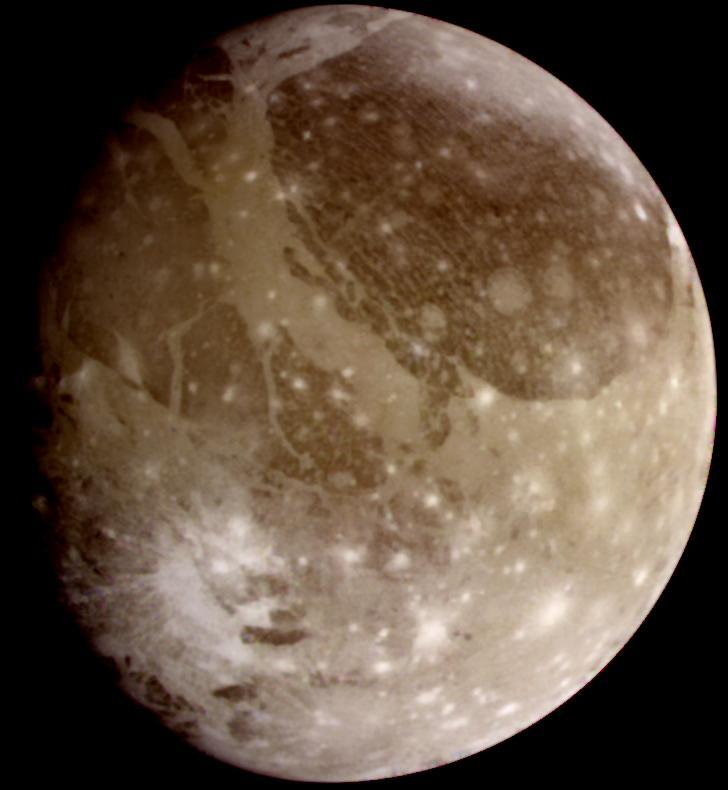
Ganymede, a moon of Jupiter, where the story takes place.

In the future, food is carefully rationed on an overcrowded Earth. Teenager William "Bill" Lermer lives with his widowed father, George, who decides to emigrate to the farming colony on Ganymede, one of Jupiter's moons. After George marries Molly Kenyon, the couple, Bill, and Molly's daughter Peggy embark on the 'torchship' Mayflower. On the journey, Bill saves his bunkmates from asphyxiation by improvising a patch when a meteor punctures their compartment. During the trip, all the children attend class; also, to combat the boredom of the long trip, the Boy Scouts among the passengers form troops. (Because the novel was originally written to be serialized in the Boy Scout magazine Boys' Life, Bill's participation in the Scouts is pervasive, mentioned at least once per chapter.)

When they arrive on Ganymede, an unpleasant surprise awaits the newcomers. The arriving group is much larger than the colony wanted or can easily absorb. The soil has to be built from scratch by pulverizing boulders and lava flows, then seeding the resulting dust with carefully formulated organic material, and the rock crushers are in short supply. While some whine about the injustice of it all, Bill accepts an invitation to live with his prospective neighbors, a prosperous farmer and his large, hard-working family, to learn the needed skills, while his father signs on as an engineer in the town of Leda. Peggy, unable to adjust to the low pressure atmosphere, has to stay in a bubble in the hospital. When the Lermers are finally reunited on their own homestead, they build their house with a pressurized room for Peggy.

One day, a rare alignment of all of Jupiter's major moons causes a devastating moonquake. Peggy is seriously injured when her room suffers an explosive decompression. Furthermore, the machinery that maintains Ganymede's "heat trap" fails and the temperature starts dropping rapidly. George quickly realizes what has happened and gets his family to the safety of the town. Others do not grasp their peril soon enough and either stay in their homes or start for town too late; two-thirds of the colonists perish, either from the quake or by freezing. The Lermers consider returning to Earth, but after Peggy dies, they decide to stay and rebuild. The colony gradually recovers.

An expedition sets out to survey more of Ganymede. Bill goes along as the cook. While exploring, he and his friend Hank discover artifacts of an alien civilization, including a working land vehicle that has legs, like a large metal centipede. This proves fortuitous when Bill's appendix bursts. Forced to adhere to a schedule, a shuttle picks up the rest of the group and leaves without the missing pair. Hank figures out how to drive the alien vehicle and transports Bill to the next landing site. Bill is then taken to the hospital for a life-saving operation.

Upon awakening from the operation, Bill contemplates a discussion he had with George about his future: whether to return to Earth for school or stay. He sneaks outside and looks up at the sky. When a nurse finds him and scolds him to return where he belongs, he replies, "I am where I belong. And I'm going to stay!"

== Reception ==
Groff Conklin wrote that although Farmer in the Sky was "conceived as a novel for 'adolescents' ... this book is also one of the best of the month's output in science fiction for adults ... an adventure story with an unusual amount of realism in its telling. It is not childish". Boucher and McComas named Farmer "just about the only mature science fiction novel of the year [1950]", describing it as "a magnificently detailed study of the technological and human problems of interplanetary colonization." Damon Knight found the novel "a typical Heinlein story ... typically brilliant, thorough and readable." P. Schuyler Miller recommended the novel unreservedly, saying that Heinlein's "minute attention to detail ... has never been more fascinatingly shown."

Surveying Heinlein's juvenile novels, Jack Williamson noted that Farmer in the Sky "has harsh realism for a juvenile." He described it as "a novel of education" where the protagonist "tell[s] his own story in a relaxed conversational style."

== Major themes ==
The book takes up consciously many of the themes of the 19th century American frontier and homesteading – but without the moral stain of dispossessing the Native Americans. In particular, a character who grows the first apple tree on Ganymede and offers seeds to other colonists comes to be known as "Johnny Appleseed" (and saves his family from freezing by burning his precious tree).

== Scientific inaccuracies ==
The three inner Galilean moons revolve in a 4:2:1 resonance.

The "heat trap", which allows humans to live on Ganymede, is a man-made implementation of the greenhouse effect, although its mechanism is never explained. This effect could be achieved in reality by releasing large quantities of super greenhouse gases, which would not require a constant power supply, and would therefore be unaffected by a disaster such as that described in the book.

Decades after publication, it was discovered that the magnetosphere of Jupiter encloses Ganymede and the other Galilean moons in an analog of Earth's Van Allen radiation belt, subjecting their surfaces to an intense rain of ionizing radiation. The Galileo flyby in 1995 discovered that Ganymede has a magnetosphere, but the shielding effect is weak; it is believed that the surface radiation intensity would still be lethal within months.

The alignment of Jupiter's four major moons as described in the book can never happen in reality. The three inner Galilean satellites are in a resonance with one another such that whenever two of them are aligned, the third will always be non-aligned and quite often situated on the opposite side of Jupiter.

The book describes Ganymede as having about 1/3 Earth gravity but in reality it is only about 1/7.

Heinlein also postulated that the surface of Ganymede was volcanic rock like the Moon. Subsequent discoveries have shown that Ganymede's crust is actually almost 90 percent ice or frost, covering a subsurface ocean.
