= Clifford Geary =

American illustrator

- Born: February 26, 1916; Somerville, Massachusetts, US
- Died: May 31, 2008 (aged 92); Milford, Massachusetts, US
- Known for: Illustration

Clifford N. Geary (February 26, 1916 – May 31, 2008) was an American illustrator of science fiction, especially Robert A. Heinlein's "juvenile series" published by Scribner's from 1948 to 1956, and of popular science.

Many of his Heinlein illustrations are done in a reversed-ground white-on-black style. Alexei Panshin's "Heinlein in Dimension" (a controversial work that Heinlein is said to have disavowed) acknowledges Geary's contribution to this important element of the Heinlein oeuvre, calling his work "quite unusual and quite striking."

Geary was raised in the Boston area and was educated at the Massachusetts School of Art. In later life he lived in Brooklyn and the Adirondacks. His book illustrations were sometimes credited to "Clifford Geary".

== Books illustrated ==
=== By Geary ===
- Ticonderoga: A Picture Story, by Clifford N. Geary, David McKay Company, New York, 50 p.

=== Heinlein ===
- Space Cadet, 1948
- Red Planet, 1949
- Farmer in the Sky, 1950
- Between Planets, 1951
- The Rolling Stones, 1952
- Starman Jones, 1953
- The Star Beast, 1954
- Time for the Stars, 1956
- The Unpleasant Profession of Jonathan Hoag (collected stories), 1959 (not in the juvenile series)

=== Margaret O. Hyde ===
- Atoms Today & Tomorrow by Margaret O. Hyde, revised edition, McGraw Hill, 1959
- Exploring Earth and Space by Margaret O. Hyde, McGraw-Hill, 159 p., various years 1957-1967
- Where Speed is King by Margaret and Edwin Hyde, McGraw-Hill, 1955, 1961

=== Other ===
- Signal Hill by Edward A. Herron
- Clara Barton, Red Cross Pioneer by Alberta Powell Graham, New York: Abingdon Press, 1956
- Science the Super Sleuth by Lynn Poole, McGraw Hill, 1954
- Your Trip into Space by Lynn Poole, McGraw-Hill
- The Hideout Club by Frank Reilly, Rinehart, 147 p., 1948
- The Magic Bat by Clem Philbrook, Macmillan, 1954
- The Real Book About Space Travel by Hal Goodwin, Garden City Books, 1952
