= Tom Corbett, Space Cadet (TV series) =

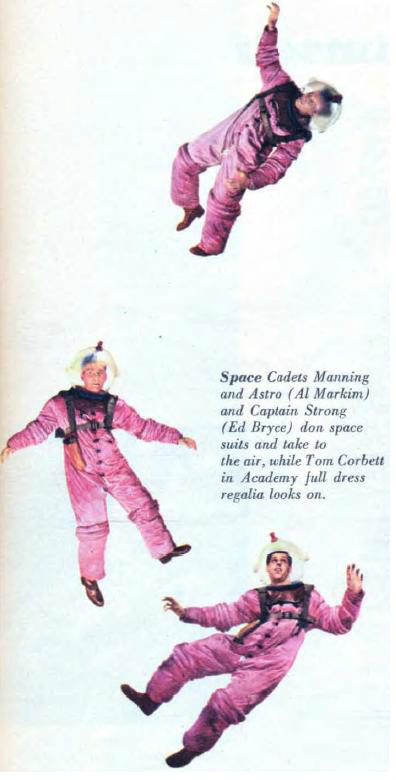
- Genre: Science fiction
- Created by: Joseph Greene
- Starring: Frankie Thomas, Al Markim, Jan Merlin, Edward Bryce
- Country of origin: United States

Original release
- Network: CBS (October 2 to December 29, 1950); ABC (January 1, 1951 to September 26, 1952); NBC (July to September 1951, December 1954 to June 25, 1955); DuMont (August 1953 to May 1954)
- Release: October 2, 1950 – June 25, 1955

Tom Corbett, Space Cadet is an American TV series that aired between 1950 and 1955, depicting the character Tom Corbett. Episodes aired for 15 minutes on weekdays and 30 minutes on Saturdays.

== Origin ==
The initial concept for the series followed the scripts by Joseph Greene originally proposed as a comic strip in 1945, and then as a proposed radio serial in 1946, titled "Space Cadets" (with a young hero named Tom Ranger), and 1947, titled "Space Academy". When Greene began work with Rockhill Studios on developing his idea into a television show in 1949, the title Tom Ranger, Space Cadet was floated for a time.

In 1950, Rockhill Studios licensed the "Space Cadet" name from Robert A. Heinlein's 1948 young-adult novel Space Cadet for the series then in development.

The initial installment of the series was edited into the 88 minute long The Mercurian Invasion, which was released in 1998.

== Cast ==
- Tom Corbett – Frankie Thomas Jr.
- Astro – Al Markim: A Venusian cadet
- Roger Manning – Jan Merlin: A smug, egotistical cadet with an inordinately high opinion of his own abilities, although he occasionally proved himself to be nearly as skilled as he imagined himself to be. Roger occasionally made condescending, racist remarks about Astro but gradually came to like and respect the Venusian, although he sometimes maintained his bigoted attitude as a distancing mechanism (October 1950-May 1954).
- Captain Steve Strong – Edward Bryce
- Dr. Joan Dale – Margaret Garland
- Commander Arkwright – Carter Blake
- Cadet Alfie Higgins – John Fiedler
- Cadet Eric Rattison – Frank Sutton
- Cadet T. J. Thistle – Jack Grimes (December 1954-June 1955)

Michael Harvey played Captain Strong for the first six episodes of the CBS series; Pat Ferris played Dr. Dale for two episodes of the DuMont series.

== Crew ==
- Technical Advisor – Willy Ley
- Writers: Albert Aley, Stu Byrnes, Frankie Thomas Jr., Ray Morse, Jack Weinstock, Willy Gilbert, Alfred Bester & others.
- Space Cadet Hats: Major Sportswear supplied tinsulated, aluminized hats with logos.

== Distribution ==
Tom Corbett is one of only six TV series to appear on all four networks of the time, along with The Arthur Murray Party, Down You Go, The Ernie Kovacs Show, Pantomime Quiz, and The Original Amateur Hour:

- CBS from October 2 to December 1950
- ABC from January 1951 to September 1952
- NBC from July to September 1951
- DuMont from August 1953 to May 1954
- NBC again from December 1954 to June 1955, with the final broadcast on June 25, 1955.

Contemporary merchandise for the series included toys, costumes, lunchboxes, and a newspaper comic strip written by Paul S. Newman and drawn by Ray Bailey.

== Radio ==
On January 1, 1952, one year after the ABC television network began airing the show, a short-lived radio version began on ABC radio. This radio version employed the same actors as the TV show. The series ran twice a week, on Tuesdays and Thursdays, at 5:30 p.m. (the TV show aired on a Monday/Wednesday/Friday schedule). The radio version ran from January 1 to July 3, 1952.

== Image gallery ==
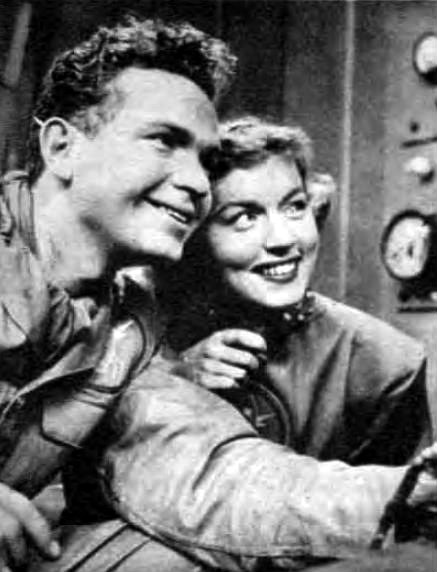
Corbett and Doctor Joan Dale

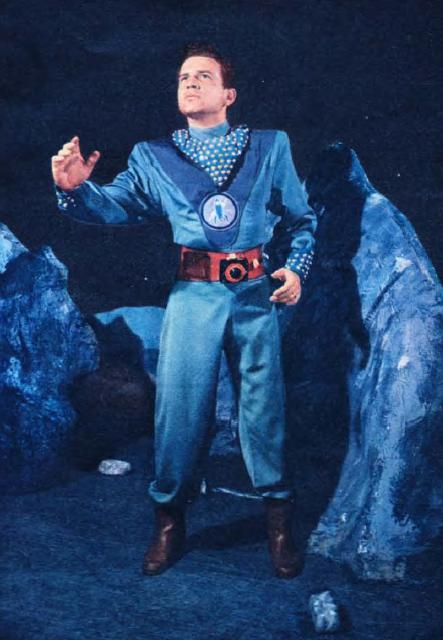
Frankie Thomas as Tom Corbett
