= Heinlein juveniles =

Young-adult novels by Robert A. Heinlein

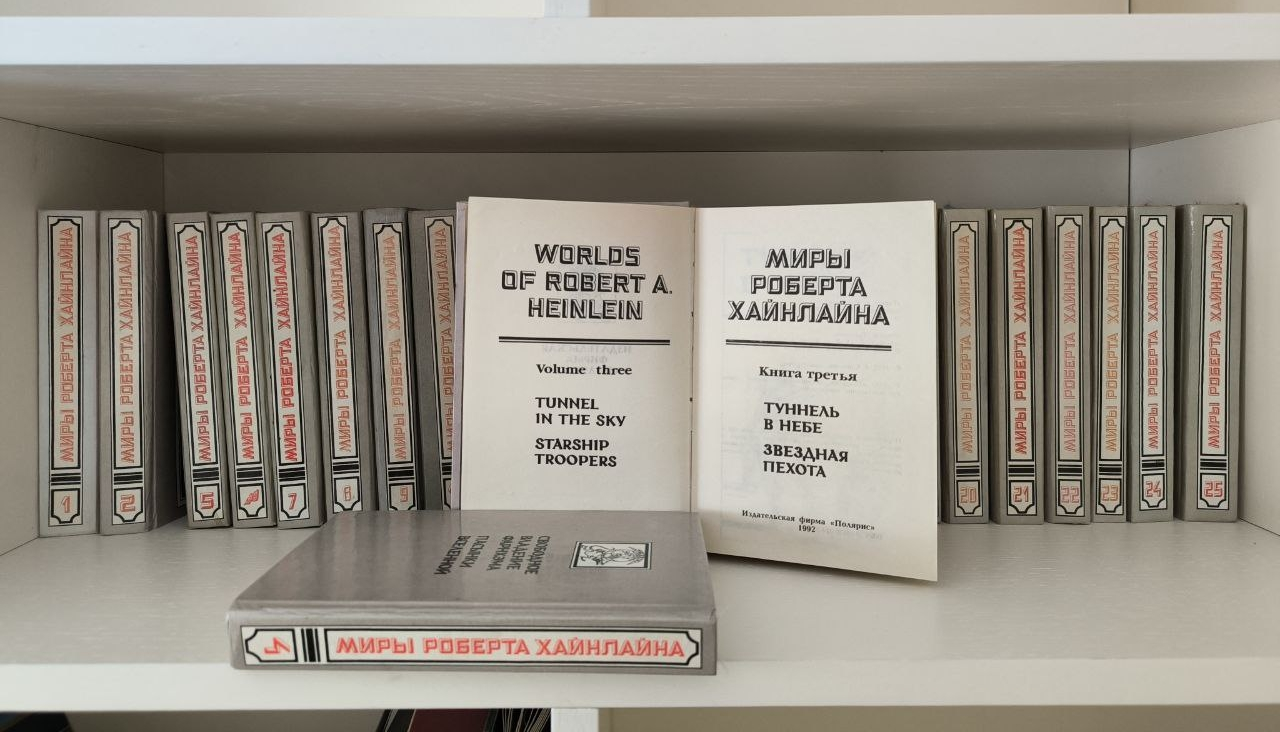
The Collected Works of R. Heinlein, Polaris Publishing House

The Heinlein juveniles are the science-fiction novels written by Robert A. Heinlein for Scribner's young-adult line. Each features "a young male protagonist entering the adult world of conflict, decisions, and responsibilities". Together, they tell a loosely connected story of space exploration. Scribner's published the first 12 between 1947 and 1958, but rejected the 13th, Starship Troopers. That one was instead published by Putnam. A 14th novel, Podkayne of Mars, is sometimes listed as a "Heinlein juvenile", although Heinlein himself did not consider it to be one.

The intended market was teenaged boys, but the books have been enjoyed by a wide range of readers. Heinlein wanted to present challenging material to children, such as the firearms for teenagers in Red Planet. This led to "annual quarrels over what was suitable for juvenile reading" with Scribner's editors.

In addition to the juveniles, Heinlein wrote two short stories about Scouting for boys and three short stories featuring Puddin', a teenaged female protagonist, for girls.

== Beginning of the Scribner's association ==
When Heinlein returned to writing after World War II, he sought to diversify beyond "the pulps". In 1946, Heinlein told his agent that his "own propaganda purposes will be best served by writing a series of boys' books". This would simultaneously broaden the audience for science fiction and also put Heinlein into a steady, lucrative market. Heinlein had already had success as a writer of short fiction for the sci-fi pulp magazines; the juveniles established him as a novelist for major publishers.

To prepare for the task, he analyzed samples of several popular series for boys, probably including Tom Swift, "Roy Rockwood", and Carl H. Claudy's stories for The American Boy magazine. By September, Heinlein's agent was able to report that the YA editor at Scribner's, Alice Dalgliesh, had liked Heinlein's draft of the first book. He had also shown her a list of contemplated sequels. In early 1947 Heinlein signed the contract with Scribner's for the first book and was having the revised draft typed; by midsummer, he had planned the second book. Heinlein went on to submit a book per year to Scribner's for a dozen years.

== Novels written for Scribner's ==
- Rocket Ship Galileo (1947)
- Space Cadet (1948)
- Red Planet (1949)
- Farmer in the Sky (1950)
- Between Planets (1951)
- The Rolling Stones (1952) (Space Family Stone in the UK)
- Starman Jones (1953)
- The Star Beast (1954)
- Tunnel in the Sky (1955)
- Time for the Stars (1956)
- Citizen of the Galaxy (1957)
- Have Space Suit—Will Travel (1958)
- Starship Troopers (1959; rejected by Scribner's, published by Putnam's)

Reviewers are divided on whether Starship Troopers should be listed with the others. Science fiction writer Jo Walton argues that it "is best understood" as one of the juveniles. Other reviewers limit the juveniles to only the books actually published by Scribner's.

== Organization of the series ==
The novels are "stand-alone"; they do not share any characters and do not form a strict chronological series. The later novels are not sequels to the earlier ones. They nonetheless tell a story of space exploration. James Gifford wrote "It is not often recognized that [the juveniles] are a reasonably consistent 'Future History' of their own".

Jack Williamson wrote: "The books, taken together, tell an epic story of the expansion of mankind across the planets of our own Sun and the stars beyond. ... a generally consistent story of the future conquest of space. The first, Rocket Ship Galileo, begins in a backyard shortly after World War II, with three boys testing a primitive rocket motor. The last, Have Space Suit—Will Travel, ends with the triumphant return of its young hero from the Lesser Magellanic Cloud... Nobody has written a more convincing and inspiring future human epic."

Another reviewer explains:

There’s a distinct story arc that follows the books; in Rocket Ship Galileo, a friendly scientist puts together a spaceship in his backyard and takes the neighbor’s kids to the moon ... As the stories move on, often in the same "Future History" universe, and never clearly out of it, we see humanity spread out into the solar system (Space Cadet, Farmer in the Sky, Red Planet, Between Planets) and eventually the stars (Time for the Stars, Starman Jones, Tunnel in the Sky) and space-faring humanity goes through its own voyage to adulthood, from explorer to colony to free nation, and finally to come into contact/conflict with galactic civilization (Have Spacesuit Will Travel) to have our maturity as a species challenged.

Have Space Suit—Will Travel recapitulates the earlier books, as the protagonist first struggles to get to the Moon, then travels to the limit of the Solar System, and eventually gets to another galaxy, where he integrates Earth into an intergalactic society.

== Reception ==
Groff Conklin wrote in 1955: "Nobody but nobody can beat Heinlein in the writing of teen-age science fiction." Jack Williamson wrote: "[An] inspiring theme of space conquest unifies the dozen Scribner's titles."

A literature review in 1985 called the juvenile books "classics in their field" that "have stood the test of time", continuing "even more than a quarter of a century after they were written, these novels are still 'contemporary', and are still among the best science fiction in the YA range".

A Wall Street Journal reviewer said in 2014 that Heinlein "lavished so much skill and imagination on these books that today they are regarded as defining elements of old-school sci-fi".

== End of the Scribner's association ==
Starship Troopers was submitted as a juvenile for Scribner's. Heinlein told his agent that he wrote it "omitting all cleavage and bed games, such that Miss Dalgliesh can offer it in the same list in which she has my other books." But he also said "I anticipate that [Dalgliesh] is not going to like parts of this book." The publisher did reject it. Heinlein told his agent he was "irked" by the rejection:

But my irk is not alone at her [Dalgliesh]; it includes Mr. Scribner himself. I feel that I was treated in a very shabby fashion, and I regard him as in part responsible and do not wish to place any more stories with his firm. Scribner's had published 12 of my books and every single one of them made a profit for them and each one is still making money for them. At one time, Miss Dalgliesh told me that my books had kept her department out of the red. So I offer a thirteenth book ... and it is turned down with a brisk little note which might as well have been a printed rejection slip, for it was just as cold and just as informative.

Heinlein ended his association with Scribner's. Putnam published the novel in 1959.

== Scouting stories for boys ==
- "Nothing Ever Happens on the Moon", 1949
- "Tenderfoot in Space", 1958

The Scouting stories, originally printed in the Boy Scouts of America magazine Boys' Life, were part of Heinlein's effort to diversify beyond pulp science fiction. Farmer in the Sky, which also had a strong connection to Scouting, was serialized in Boys' Life under the title "Satellite Scout". Heinlein considered writing another Boy Scout story called "Polar Scout" in conjunction with a planned trip to Antarctica in early 1964, with the goal of releasing a collection of Scouting-related stories as a juvenile book. The trip did not take place and the author never wrote "Polar Scout".

== Puddin' stories for girls ==
- "Poor Daddy", 1949
- "Cliff and the Calories", 1950
- "The Bulletin Board", 1951

Upon delivery of one of his early juveniles, his editor at Scribner's wished someone would write stories for girls. Heinlein took this as a challenge and wrote a short story for girls. The story, a first-person tale featuring Maureen "Puddin'", appeared under the byline "R. A. Heinlein" in Calling All Girls magazine. He wrote two more, and planned four additional stories with the goal of publishing a collection titled Men Are Exasperating, but he never wrote any more and the Puddin' stories have never been collected in one volume.

== Podkayne of Mars ==
Heinlein wrote, "I grew so fond of Maureen [from the Puddin' stories] that I helped her to get rid of that excess weight, changed her name to 'Podkayne', and moved her to Mars (along with her unbearable kid brother)." Heinlein felt that a particular ending for Podkayne of Mars, published in 1963, was dramatically necessary to the story. Early readers hated it, however, and he reluctantly changed it. In 1995, the book was released again with both the published and original endings.

Podkayne's categorization as a "Heinlein juvenile" is unclear. Some reviewers list it with the juveniles, and it is narrated by a teenager, but Heinlein himself did not regard it as a "juvenile".

== Ties to other works ==
Heinlein wrote a few series of linked stories and novels. Three of the juveniles are connected to his Future History. Hazel Stone of The Rolling Stones also appears in The Moon Is a Harsh Mistress, The Number of the Beast, and The Cat Who Walks Through Walls. Space Cadet is set after "The Long Watch", which appears on Heinlein's Future History chart. The protagonist of Farmer in the Sky, Bill Lermer, plays the song "The Green Hills of Earth" on his accordion; the song is featured in the story of the same name from Heinlein's Future History. Farmer also refers to the Space Patrol, the interplanetary peace-keeping organization described in Space Cadet.

The Mars of Red Planet seems to be the Mars of Stranger in a Strange Land; Jack Williamson wrote, "The Martians in this story have a special interest, because they are the educators of Valentine Michael Smith [and] they display the same appalling powers that Smith brings back to Earth." Have Space Suit—Will Travel mentions a recently established lunar base and an "infant Luna City", possible early references to what Heinlein developed into the lunar outpost of his Future History and the lunar colony of The Moon Is a Harsh Mistress.

Other juveniles do not as a whole integrate easily into those series. For example, the timeline for interstellar travel in Time for the Stars does not fit into the Future History. Neither does the Arachnid War from Starship Troopers, nor the appearance of the advanced civilization in the Lesser Magellanic Cloud from Have Space Suit—Will Travel. Some of the juveniles which do not integrate with each other, nevertheless share similar elements of setting. The Mars of several of the books (Red Planet, Between Planets, The Rolling Stones, and Time for the Stars) has indigenous, intelligent (even dangerous) life, but they are not necessarily the same Martians in each book.
