= Lummox =

A lummox is a clumsy or stupid person.

Lummox may also refer to:

- Lummox, a 1923 novel by Fannie Hurst
- Lummox (film), a 1930 film adaptation of the novel
- Lummox, the title character of the 1954 novel The Star Beast by Robert Heinlein
- Lummox, a fictional humanoid species in The Ren & Stimpy Show (1991–1996)
- Lummox, a species of creature in the 1997 video game SaGa Frontier
