= Joseph Greene (writer) =

American novelist

- Born: Joseph Lawrence Greene; August 1, 1914
- Died: 1990
- Occupations: Novelist; writer; editor
- Children: Paul
- Writing career
- Pen name: Alvin Schwartz, Richard Mark, Joseph Lawrence, Joe Green, Joseph Verdy, Larry Verdi, Lawrence Vert
- Genres: Science fiction, superheroes, romance comics
- Notable work: Tom Corbett, Space Cadet

Joseph Lawrence Greene (August 1, 1914 – 1990) was an American author of science fiction novels and short stories whose most familiar creations are Tom Corbett, Space Cadet which, in 1951, became a television series popular with young audiences, as well as Dig Allen Space Explorer, a series of six books published between 1959 and 1962, which focused around the adolescent hero Dig Allen and his interplanetary adventures in the genre of boys' juvenile literature. A prolific writer, he also contributed numerous stories to comic books and was an editor, until 1972, for Grosset publishing while writing under a number of pseudonyms including, purportedly, the house pen name "Alvin Schwartz" and also "Richard Mark", and using sundry variations of his own name ("Joseph Lawrence", "Joe Green", "Joseph Verdy", "Larry Verdi", "Lawrence Vert"), which exemplified such foreign-language wordplays for "Green" as "Verdy", "Verdi" and "Vert".

== Comics ==
Joseph Greene was involved in many key titles during the so-called Golden Age of Comic Books, during the late 1930s and early 1940s. He apparently acted as "a ghost writer for the some of most famous comic characters of the era", including The Green Lama, Spunky and Golden Lad (for Spark Publications). In 1942, he is believed to have begun working for DC Comics on their All-American line of characters including Aquaman, Boy Commandos, Green Arrow, Hawkman, Superman and Wonder Woman.

He is also said to have worked for comics publishers including the American Comics Group, Better Publications (including on The Fighting Yank), Dell Publications (including Tom Corbett, Space Cadet), Lev Gleason Publications, Marvel Comics as well as Fawcett Comics and Hillman Periodicals for which, during the early 1950s, he wrote various romance comics.

According to comics historian Jerry Bails, Greene wrote for Frank Frazetta's syndicated newspaper strip Johnny Comet/Ace McCoy in 1952–53, and CIO News' first strip, The Adventures of Jim Barry, Trouble Shooter. He also reputedly provided work for the pulp magazine features The Black Bat and The Phantom.

== Early Tom Corbett ==
Greene also produced work for radio, film and television, most notably for various versions of Tom Corbett. Around 1945, he provided a script for a comic book storyline likely entitled Space Academy, before submitting to Orbit Feature Services, Inc., on January 16, 1946, a script (originally titled The Pirates of Space, but subsequently revised to Space Cadets) for a prospective radio show featuring primary cadet Tom Ranger. The following year, Greene refined the title as Space Academy, submitting another radio script to NBC, and, ultimately, to Rockhill Studios, which expanded its efforts in working with him to develop it as a show for the newly developing medium of television. By 1949, the title was reconsidered, as both "Cadet" and "Academy" were thought to be somewhat ubiquitous — indeed, in 1948, Robert A. Heinlein, one of the top names in science fiction, published a novel entitled Space Cadet — so the title was expanded (by Greene and Rockhill's Stanley Wolf) to include the name of the main character: Tom Ranger, Space Cadet. In order for this to come about, Rockhill licensed "the "Space Cadet" name from Robert Heinlein... [and] milk[ed] th[e] connection... in its publicity." Thus, in October 1949, Tom Ranger and the Space Cadets was developed as a syndicated newspaper strip, although the strip went unused until it was recycled a few years later.

== Corbett debut on TV and in comics ==
On October 2, 1950, at the start of TV's third full-schedule season, drawing on the unpublished newspaper strip, and undergoing a last minute name-change, Tom Corbett, Space Cadet premiered on CBS. Eleven months later, on September 9, 1951, a newspaper strip of the same name, written by Paul S. Newman (with unknown levels of input from Greene) and illustrated by Ray Bailey (a ghost artist for Milton Caniff on the Steve Canyon strip), made its debut. Distributed by Field Enterprise Syndicate, it drew heavily on the unpublished 1949 Tom Ranger strip, itself recycled and adapted into the first TV episode.

In 1951, Greene sued Rockhill over royalty payments, ultimately being awarded a judgment over payments "for the television or radio show but not both," as well as full rights (minus royalty fees to Rockhill) to any comic book version of Tom Corbett. Greene wrote Tom Corbett, Space Ranger comics for Dell Publications between 1952 and 1954. In the same year, Grosset & Dunlap began publishing a series of Tom Corbett books, beginning with Stand by for Mars!, while the second and third seasons of Tom Corbett proceeded on ABC television, while a six-month radio show aired on ABC radio.

In 1953, with the financially successful release of the theatrical feature It Came From Outer Space, Rockhill sued Universal Pictures for using "a modified Practi-Cole Products Tom Corbett helmet" in the production. Universal settled the case for $750.

== Corbett books ==
Published, starting in 1952, by Grosset & Dunlap (which, by the 1950s, was a well-established publisher of series such as Nancy Drew, The Hardy Boys and Rick Brant), the Tom Corbett series was published as a tie-in to the character whose copyright lay with Rockhill Radio, and the plots, which strove to provide inspiration, echoed the radio scripts more than the ones on television or in comics.

Written under the name "Carey Rockwell", the series' authorship is not nearly as well documented as that of the Stratemeyer Syndicate's output, but suggestions naturally include Greene himself as editor (an association made by Jerry Bails) if not also writer. Another possibility names The Cincinnati Kid-author Richard Jessup as a candidate for authorship of the Corbett novels.

Technical advice was provided by Willy Ley, one of the leading rocket experts of the 1950s, and also a writer of science fiction who not only "helped design the Marx Tom Corbett Space Academy playset" for the character, but was known for years as a key voice urging the development of U.S. space exploration and as author of myriad journal articles and books, including contributions to Collier's Man in the Moon series.

== Corbett continues ==
The series would ultimately run for five seasons, beginning its fourth season on DuMont Network in 1953, and its fifth and final season a year later on NBC. Grosset & Dunlap published its eighth "Tom Corbett" title (Robot Rocket) in 1955/56, marking the effective end of the series on radio, television, and in books.

Following an investigation by the Internal Revenue Service in 1965 over delinquent taxes, Rockhill's rights to Tom Corbett were purchased by a new entity, Direct Recordings, Inc. while papers owned by Stanley Wolfe were later donated to the University of Southern California.

In 1984, Greene gave his personal "kinescopes" of the television episodes to TV nostalgia merchant Wade Williams, who subsequently assumed some rights to Corbett.

In 1990, Eternity Comics produced a five-issue collection of the 1950s newspaper strips, under the title Original Tom Corbett, Space Cadet.

== Books ==
Greene is likely to have overseen, plotted and edited — if not also ghost-written — some (or all) of the eight Tom Corbett, Space Cadet novels for Grosset & Dunlap, published between 1952 and 1956. Between 1959 and 1962, he wrote six titles in the Juvenile SF series "Dig Allen Space Explorer for Golden Press." These began with 1959's The Forgotten Star, and finished with 1962's Lost City of Uranus.

Greene served as an editor at Grosset roughly between 1964 and 1973, ultimately working his way up to the positions of "managing editor and acting editor-in-chief before leaving the company."

During his semi-retirement in the late 1970s and 1980s, he published a number of independent almanacs - "several about astrology and one entitled American Elsewhen Almanac."

Joseph Greene's son, Paul, in a letter subsequently reprinted online, indicated that his father died in 1990, the year of his 76th birthday, but the date and circumstances have not been indicated.
