= Supreme Lord (disambiguation) =

In religion, Supreme Lord is another way to refer to a supreme being.

Supreme Lord can also refer to:

- Doctor Doom, Supreme Lord of the fictional country of Latveria in the Marvel universe
- Paul Neuman, Supreme Lord of the Australian microstate of the Sovereign State of Aeterna Lucina
- Supreme Lord (band), of which Polish musician Tomasz Rejek was a member
- Supreme Lord (Centuria), fictional king of Torivia in the Japanese web manga Centuria
