= Have Space Suit—Will Travel =

1958 SF novel by Robert A. Heinlein

Have Space Suit — Will Travel
- Cover art for the hardcover first edition
- Author: Robert A. Heinlein
- Cover artist: Ed Emshwiller
- Language: English
- Series: Heinlein juveniles
- Genre: Science fiction
- Publisher: Scribner's
- Publication date: 1958
- Publication place: United States
- Media type: Print (hardcover & paperback)
- Preceded by: Citizen of the Galaxy

Have Space Suit—Will Travel is a science fiction novel for young readers by American writer Robert A. Heinlein, originally serialized in The Magazine of Fantasy & Science Fiction (August, September, and October 1958) and published by Scribner's in hardcover in 1958. The last Heinlein novel to be published by Scribner's, it was nominated for a Hugo Award in 1959 and won the Sequoyah Children's Book Award for 1961. Heinlein's engineering expertise enabled him to add realistic detail; during World War II, he had been a civilian aeronautics engineer at a laboratory which developed pressure suits for use at high altitudes.

== Plot summary ==
In the near future, Earth has established some lunar bases. High school senior Clifford "Kip" Russell is determined to get to the Moon, but the price of a ticket is far beyond his reach. His unorthodox father suggests he enter an advertising jingle-writing contest; first prize is an all-expenses-paid trip there. Instead, he wins a used space suit. Kip puts the suit (which he names "Oscar") back into working condition.

Kip reluctantly decides to return his space suit for a cash prize to help pay for college, but puts it on for one last walk. As he idly broadcasts on his shortwave radio, someone identifying herself as "Peewee" answers and requests a homing signal. He is shocked when a flying saucer lands practically on top of him. An 11-year-old girl (Peewee) and an alien (the "Mother Thing") flee from it, but all three are quickly captured and taken to the Moon.

Their kidnapper, nicknamed "Wormface", is a horrible-looking alien who contemptuously refers to any not of his species as "animals". Wormface has two human flunkies, "Fats" and "Skinny", who assisted him in initially capturing the Mother Thing and Peewee, the latter a genius and the daughter of an eminent scientist. The Mother Thing speaks in what sounds like birdsong (illustrated by a few musical notations), but Kip and Peewee have no trouble understanding her.

Kip, Peewee, and the Mother Thing escape and try to reach the nearest human lunar base on foot, but they are recaptured and taken to a base on Pluto. Kip is thrown into a cell, later to be joined by Fats and Skinny, who have apparently outlived their usefulness. After Skinny is taken away, Fats tells Kip that his former employers eat humans, before he too disappears.

The Mother Thing, meanwhile, makes herself useful to their captors by constructing advanced devices for them in order to steal enough parts to assemble a bomb and a transmitter. The bomb takes care of all but one of the Wormfaces, and between them, Kip and Peewee deal with the last one. The Mother Thing freezes solid when she tries to set up the transmitter outside without a spacesuit. Kip puts Oscar on and activates the beacon, but becomes severely frostbitten in the extreme cold. Help arrives quickly. Kip, Peewee and the Mother Thing are transported to Vega V, the Mother Thing's home planet.

Kip is kept in a state of cryopreservation while the Mother Thing's people figure out how to heal him. It turns out that the Mother Thing is far hardier than Kip had suspected and freezing did not hurt her. While Kip recuperates, a Vegan anthropologist whom Kip nicknames "Joe" learns about Earth from Peewee and Kip. Once Kip is well, he, Peewee, and the Mother Thing travel to a planet in the Lesser Magellanic Cloud, to face an intergalactic tribunal, composed of many advanced species that have banded together for self-protection.

The Wormfaces are put on trial first. Their representatives are so arrogantly xenophobic that they promise to destroy the "animals" who dared to try the "Only People", and are judged to be dangerous. Their species is sentenced to have their planet "rotated" 90° out of the present space-time ... without their star, most likely dooming them to freezing to death.

Then it is humanity's turn to be judged, as represented by Peewee, Kip, and two additional humans retrieved from different historical eras: Iunio (an ancient Roman centurion) and a Neanderthal man. The Neanderthal is rejected as being of another species. Iunio proves belligerent, but brave. Peewee's and Kip's recorded remarks are then admitted into evidence. In humanity's defense, Kip makes an impassioned speech. The Mother Thing and a representative of another race argue that the short-lived species are essentially children who should be granted more time to learn and grow. It is decided to re-evaluate humanity after "a dozen half-deaths of radium" (19,200 years).

Kip and Peewee are returned to Earth with advanced alien devices and scientific equations provided by the Vegans to help the human race advance. Kip passes the information along to Professor Reisfeld, Peewee's father. Reisfeld arranges a full scholarship for Kip at the Massachusetts Institute of Technology, where Kip wants to study engineering and spacesuit design.

== Reception ==
Floyd C. Gale wrote that the book "is possibly the most unabashedly juvenile of Heinlein's long list ... Great for kids, chancy for grownups who don't identify readily with adolescent heroes".

== Film adaptation ==
In 2010, it was announced that Star Trek writer Harry Kloor had written a script for a film version and optioned the film rights. The film was expected to have come out in 2013, but as of 2026 was still listed as "in development".

== Editions ==
- 1958, Charles Scribner's Sons, hardcover
- 1970, Ace Books, paperback
- 1971, NEL, paperback, ISBN 0-450-00729-4
- 1977, Ballantine, paperback, ISBN 0-345-26071-6
- May 1, 1977, Macmillan Publishing Company, hardcover, ISBN 0-684-14857-9
- July 12, 1981, Del Rey, paperback, ISBN 0-345-30103-X
- May 12, 1985, Del Rey, paperback, 256 pages, ISBN 0-345-32441-2
- July 1, 1987, Hodder & Stoughton General Division, paperback, ISBN 0-450-00729-4
- June 1, 1994, Buccaneer Books, hardcover, ISBN 1-56849-288-X
- October 1, 1999, Sagebrush, library binding, ISBN 0-613-13639-X
- July 2003, Del Rey Books, hardcover, ISBN 0-613-94907-2
- July 29, 2003, Del Rey, paperback, 240 pages, ISBN 0-345-46107-X
- December 1, 2003, Full Cast Audio, cassette audiobook, ISBN 1-932076-39-5
- December 1, 2003, Full Cast Audio, cassette audiobook, ISBN 1-932076-40-9
- December 1, 2003, Full Cast Audio, CD audiobook, ISBN 1-932076-41-7
- February 8, 2005, Pocket, paperback, 256 pages, ISBN 1-4165-0549-0
- December 2008, Virginia Edition (Vol. 21), hardcover, 192 pages, ISBN 978-1-897350-26-3

The cover for one of the French editions (Presses Pocket, 1978) is by notable science fiction illustrator Jean-Claude Mézières.

== See also ==
- 1958 in science fiction
- Wielka, większa i największa, a Polish 1960 novel that features a similar plot
