= Rocket Ship Galileo =

1947 SF novel by Robert A. Heinlein

- First edition cover
- Author: Robert A. Heinlein
- Illustrator: Thomas Voter
- Language: English
- Series: Heinlein juveniles
- Genre: Science fiction
- Publisher: Scribner's
- Publication date: May 1, 1947
- Publication place: United States
- Media type: Print (hardback & paperback)
- Pages: 212
- Followed by: Space Cadet

Rocket Ship Galileo, a juvenile science-fiction novel by the American writer Robert A. Heinlein, published in 1947, features three teenagers who participate in a pioneering flight to the Moon. It was the first in the Heinlein juveniles, a long and successful series of science-fiction novels published by Scribner's. Heinlein originally envisioned the novel as the first of a series of books called "Young Rocket Engineers". Publishers initially rejected the script, judging going to the Moon as "too far out".

== Plot summary ==
After World War II, three teenage rocket experimenters are recruited by one boy's uncle, Dr. Cargraves, a renowned physicist who had worked on the Manhattan Project, to refit a conventionally powered surplus mail rocket. It is to be converted to run on a thorium nuclear pile which boils zinc as a propellant. They use a cleared area in a military weapons test range in the desert for their work, despite prying and sabotage attempts by unknown agents.

Upon completion of the modifications, they stock the rocket, which they name the Galileo, and take off for the Moon, taking approximately three days to arrive. After establishing a semi-permanent structure based on a Quonset hut, they claim the Moon on behalf of the United Nations.

As they set up a radio to communicate with the Earth they pick up a local transmission, the sender of which promises to meet them. Instead, their ship is bombed. However, they are able to hole up undetected in their hut and succeed in ambushing the other ship when it lands, capturing the pilot. They discover that there is a Nazi base on the Moon. They bomb it from their captured ship and land. One survivor is found, revived, and questioned.

The boys also find evidence of an ancient extraterrestrial lunar civilization, and postulate that the craters of the Moon were formed not by impacts from space, but by nuclear bombs that destroyed the alien race.

When the base's Nazi leader shoots the pilot in order to silence him, Cargraves convenes a trial and finds him guilty of murder. Cargraves prepares to execute the prisoner by ejecting him into vacuum, mostly as a bluff for information on how to fly the base's spaceship. The Nazi capitulates in the airlock and teaches them how to fly the ship back to Earth.

The boys radio the location of the hidden Nazi base on Earth to the authorities, leading to its destruction; they return as heroes.

== Adaptations ==
The 1950 movie Destination Moon was loosely based on Rocket Ship Galileo, and Heinlein was one of three co-authors of the script. The film's plot also resembles that of "The Man Who Sold the Moon", which Heinlein wrote in 1949 but did not publish until 1951.

== Critical reception ==
Surveying Heinlein's juvenile novels, Jack Williamson noted that while Rocket Ship Galileo remains "readable, with Heinlein's familiar themes already emerging", it was a "sometimes fumbling experiment. ... The plot is often trite, and the characters are generally thin stereotypes." Robert Wilfred Franson said that "Heinlein wants there always to be young people of the right mind and character to seize such opportunities. His novels went a long way toward educating such a class of people, and still are doing so."
