= Citizen of the Galaxy =

1957 novel by Robert A. Heinlein

- First edition cover
- Author: Robert A. Heinlein
- Illustrator: L. E. Fisher
- Language: English
- Series: Heinlein juveniles
- Genre: Science fiction
- Publisher: Scribner's
- Publication date: 1957
- Publication place: United States
- Media type: Print (hardback & paperback)
- Preceded by: Time for the Stars
- Followed by: Have Space Suit—Will Travel

Citizen of the Galaxy is a science fiction novel by American writer Robert A. Heinlein, originally serialized in Astounding Science Fiction (September, October, November, and December 1957) and published in hardcover in 1957 as one of the Heinlein juveniles by Scribner's. The story is heavily influenced by Rudyard Kipling's Kim.

== Plot summary ==
The novel is set in a future in which the human race has developed interstellar spaceflight and is engaged in trade with a number of alien races. However, human slavery has reappeared on some planets. The Hegemonic Guard, the space military force of the human government, tries to enforce the law and fight the slave trade.

Thorby is a young, defiant boy who is purchased at a slave auction on the planet Jubbul by an old beggar, Baslim the Cripple, for a trivial sum and taken to the beggar's surprisingly well-furnished underground home. Thereafter, Baslim treats the boy as a son, teaching him not only the trade of begging, but also mathematics, history, and several languages, while sending Thorby on errands all over the city. Thorby slowly realizes that his foster father is not a simple beggar, but is gathering intelligence, particularly on the slave trade. In addition, Baslim has Thorby memorize a contingency plan and a message to deliver to any of five starship captains in the event of Baslim's arrest or death. Baslim is arrested for spying, but commits suicide before he can be questioned. While the local police carry out a manhunt for Thorby, he delivers the message to Captain Krausa of the starship Sisu. Because the "Free Traders", to whom Krausa belongs, owe a great debt to Baslim for the rescue of one of their crews from a slaver, the captain takes Thorby aboard at great risk to himself and his clan.

The Free Traders have an insular, clannish, matriarchal culture. They live aboard spaceships, traveling from world to world to trade. Thorby is formally adopted by the captain (thereby gaining considerable shipboard social status) and adjusts to their ways, learning their language and intricate social rules. The advanced education provided by Baslim and the fast reflexes of youth make him an ideal fire controlman; Thorby saves Sisu, destroying a pirate craft bent on enslaving the crew. His immediate superior, a young woman named Mata, begins to view him as husband material, taboo by Free Trader custom because they are in the same moiety, so she is transferred to another ship.

The captain's wife, who is also the executive officer and the actual head of the clan, wants to use Thorby's connection to Baslim to enhance Sisu's prestige by marrying him off to a woman from another powerful clan. Captain Krausa, however, obeys Baslim's last wish by delivering the boy to a military cruiser of the Hegemonic Guard of the Terran Hegemony, the dominant military power in the galaxy. The captain, who was one of Baslim's couriers, passes along Baslim's request that the Guard help reunite Thorby with his family, if possible. Thorby discovers that Baslim was actually a colonel in the Hegemonic Guard who volunteered to spy on Jubbul to fight slavery. In order to avoid paying for a costly background search, Thorby agrees to enlist in the Hegemonic Guard.

Thorby is ultimately identified as Thor Bradley Rudbek, the long-lost primary heir of a very powerful, extremely wealthy family which controls Rudbek and Associates, a large, sprawling interstellar conglomerate. In his absence, the business has been run by a relative by marriage, "Uncle" John Weemsby, who encourages his stepdaughter Leda to help Thorby adjust to his new situation while secretly scheming to block Thorby's growing interest and interference in the company.

Thorby, investigating his parents' disappearance and his capture and sale by slavers, comes to suspect that his parents were eliminated to prevent the discovery that some subsidiaries of Rudbek and Associates were secretly supporting (and profiting from) the slave trade. When Weemsby quashes further investigation, Thorby seeks legal help and launches a proxy fight, which he unexpectedly wins when Leda votes her shares in his favor. He fires Weemsby and assumes full control of the firm. When Thorby realizes that extricating Rudbek and Associates from the slave trade is a monumental task, he reluctantly abandons his dream of following in Baslim's footsteps and joining the elite anti-slaver "X" Corps of the Hegemonic Guard. Knowing that a person cannot run out on his responsibilities, he resolves to fight the slave trade as the head of Rudbek and Associates.

== Reception ==
Galaxy reviewer Floyd C. Gale praised the novel, saying "Heinlein is invariably logical. And invariably entertaining." In The New York Times, Villiers Gerson received the novel favorably, declaring it "better than 99 per cent of the science-fiction adventures produced every year" despite structural problems and a weak ending."

== Themes ==
As in many of Heinlein's books, the principal character grows in wisdom and knowledge, beginning in relative ignorance, learning from experience, receiving the benefits of education, and using that education to resolve subsequent problems - both his own and those of the people around him. Thorby integrates sequentially into four major completely different social settings, each of which presents a form of slavery contrasted with personal freedom.
