= Al Markim =

American actor

Alfred Markim (born Alfred D. Moskowitz; May 22, 1927 – November 24, 2015) was an American film and television actor, best known for his role as Astro in the 1950s live, sci-fi television series, Tom Corbett, Space Cadet. His lead character, Astro, was an engineer and scientist from Venus on the show. He transitioned to television production during the 1960s and was inducted into the Video Hall of Fame in 1996.

== Early life and career ==
Markim was born and raised in Wilkes-Barre, Pennsylvania. He served in the United States Army during World War II and was present at the post-war Nuremberg trials. He became an actor following the war, appearing in the off-Broadway production of La Ronde and early episodes of the CBS soap opera, Love of Life.

Markim appeared in the lead role of Astro in the popular sci-fi television series, Tom Corbett, Space Cadet, which aired from 1950 to 1955. The series, which was broadcast live from a New York City studio, aired on all four of the existing television networks of the era - CBS, ABC, NBC, and the DuMont Television Network.

== Achievements ==
Markim transitioned from acting to television production during the 1960s. He became MGM's executive in charge of production, from which he oversaw the production of the 1964 film, The Pawnbroker, as well as being associate producer of The Fool Killer in 1965. He co-founded his company, Teletronics, in 1968, which later partnered with Sony. His company later became the Video Corporation of America, which ultimately merged with Technicolor. In 1996, Markim was inducted into the Video Hall of Fame.

== Personal life ==
He and his wife Sondra had five children. Markim, a resident of Piermont, New York, died on November 24, 2015, at the age of 88.
