= Red Planet (novel) =

1949 SF novel by Robert A. Heinlein

- The cover illustration by Clifford Geary for the original 1949 edition
- Author: Robert A. Heinlein
- Illustrator: Clifford Geary
- Language: English
- Series: Heinlein juveniles
- Genre: Science fiction
- Publisher: Scribner's
- Publication date: 1949
- Publication place: United States
- Media type: Print (hardback & paperback)
- Preceded by: Space Cadet
- Followed by: Farmer in the Sky

Red Planet is a 1949 science fiction novel by Robert A. Heinlein about students at boarding school on the planet Mars. It represents the first appearance of Heinlein's idealized Martian elder race (see also Stranger in a Strange Land). The version published in 1949 featured a number of changes forced on Heinlein by Scribner's, since it was published as part of the Heinlein juveniles. After Heinlein's death, the book was reissued by Del Rey Books as the author originally intended.

== Plot summary ==
Mars has been colonized by humans, but is governed by an administrator appointed by an Earth-based company - the colonists have no political power. Colonial teenagers Jim Marlowe and Frank Sutton travel to the Lowell Academy boarding school for the start of the academic year. Jim takes along his native Martian pet, Willis the Bouncer, a round furry ball the size of a volleyball, who is about as intelligent as a human child and has a photographic memory for sounds, which he can also reproduce perfectly. At a rest stop, Willis wanders off and encounters one of the adult sentient Martians. The three-legged alien takes the two boys and Willis to participate in a ritual called "growing together" with a group of its fellows. They also share water, making Jim and Frank "water friends" with the Martian, named Gekko.

At school, Jim gets into trouble with the authoritarian headmaster, Mr. Howe, who confiscates Willis, claiming that it is against the new rules to have pets. When Jim and Frank sneak into Howe's office and rescue Willis, the bouncer repeats two overheard conversations between Howe and Beecher, the unscrupulous colonial administrator of Mars, detailing Beecher's plans for Willis and for the colony. When Beecher learns Howe has a bouncer, he is ecstatic; the London Zoo is willing to pay a hefty price for a specimen. Worse, Beecher has secretly planned to prevent the annual migration of the colonists (to avoid 12 months of severe winter weather) in order to save money. The boys run away from school to warn their parents and the colony.

The boys set out to skate the thousands of miles on the frozen Martian canals to their homes. During the trip, Frank gets sick. On the third night, they are forced to take shelter inside a giant Martian cabbage-plant (nearly suffocating when it folds up at night). The next day they meet some native Martians, who accept Jim because of his relationship to Willis and water-friendship with Gekko. The Martians treat Frank's illness and send the two boys home by a swift, previously unknown subway.

Once warned, Jim's father quickly organizes the migration, hoping to catch Beecher off guard. The colonists reach and take over the boarding school, turning it into a temporary shelter. Howe locks himself in his office, while Beecher sets up automatic, photosensor-controlled weapons outside to stop the malcontents (as he calls them) from leaving. After two colonists are killed trying to surrender, and the power to the building is cut, the colonists decide they have no choice but to fight back. The colonists organize a raiding party, with the boys taking part, capture Beecher's office and proclaim the colony's independence from Earth.

Several Martians enter the school area, and one of them shows up in the door leading to Howe's office, hiding him from sight. When the Martian turns away, Howe is nowhere to be found. The Martians then go to Beecher's building, and when they leave, he also has vanished. The Martians had been content to allow humans to share their planet, but Beecher's threat to Willis has made them reconsider. They present the colonists with an ultimatum: leave the planet or else. Dr. MacRae negotiates with the Martians, and succeeds in persuading them to let the colonists stay, mainly because of Jim's strong friendship with Willis.

MacRae theorizes that Martians start life as bouncers, metamorphose into adults, then continue to exist after their deaths as the "old ones". In the end, Jim resigns himself to giving Willis up so the bouncer can undergo the transformation to adulthood.

As with Podkayne of Mars, there are two versions of the ending. As originally written (and published much later) it is made clear that Willis will not emerge as an adult for 40 years. Heinlein's publishers edited and changed this, as well as a discussion early in the novel in which MacRae expresses strong support for adults and older children being free to carry handguns, and opposition to any government which would restrict that.

== Critical reception ==
Surveying Heinlein's juvenile novels, Jack Williamson characterized Red Planet as Heinlein's first genuinely successful effort in the sequence, saying that "Heinlein [has] found his true direction ... The Martian setting is logically constructed and rich in convincing detail [while] the characters are engaging and the action develops naturally."

P. Schuyler Miller, reviewing the original edition, praised the novel's "verisimilitude, the attention to detail which Heinlein's adult readers know well. . . . the explanations are never dragged in for their own sake, and the plot grows naturally out of the setting."

== Connections with Stranger in a Strange Land ==
The life cycle of Martians (as described by MacRae) is the same in Stranger in a Strange Land. It is noted in this novel that the "old ones" inhabit two planes of existence: the physical and the (unspecified) other. Further, the water friends theme is recapitulated in Stranger in a Strange Land as "water brothers." Furthermore, the Martian ability to make an item or person disappear, which was a major plot point in Stranger, is demonstrated here. Jack Williamson writes that "The Martians in this story have a special interest, because they are the educators of Valentine Michael Smith [and] they display the same appalling powers that Smith brings back to Earth."

The general description of Martian society as characterized by reverence for freedom is similar. For instance, the Martian Gekko "radiates displeasure" upon understanding what is meant by "london-zoo," and further discovering that Howe meant to sell Willis to a zoo—a reaction not dissimilar to that of Mike, who often senses a "wrongness" in cages, and whose first impulse when encountering the caged animals of a zoo is to attempt to set them free.

== Adaptations ==
In 1994, the novel was adapted (and much altered) by Gunther-Wahl Productions into an animated miniseries for Fox Kids.

== Influences ==
The background of Mars presented in the novel, as a desert planet crisscrossed by giant Martian canals built by an ancient civilization to bring water from the polar ice caps, is a common scenario in science fiction novels of the early 20th century, and was actually put forward as a plausible theory by some astronomers around that time, notably Percival Lowell, mentioned in the novel. It stems from early telescope observations of Mars by 19th century astronomers who, beginning with the Italian Giovanni Schiaparelli in 1877, believed they saw straight lines on the planet. Schiaparelli called them canali (grooves), which was popularly mistranslated into English as "canals".

== Editions ==
- September 12, 1981, Del Rey, paperback, 208 pages, ISBN 0-345-34039-6
- June 12, 1986, Del Rey, paperback, 189 pages, ISBN 0-345-26069-4
- January 1, 1971, Ace, paperback, 189 pages
- September 26, 2006, Del Rey, paperback, 256 pages, ISBN 0-345-49318-4
- December 2008, Virginia Edition (Vol. 12), hardcover, 171 pages, ISBN 978-1-897350-17-1
