= Starman Jones =

1953 science-fiction novel by Robert A. Heinlein

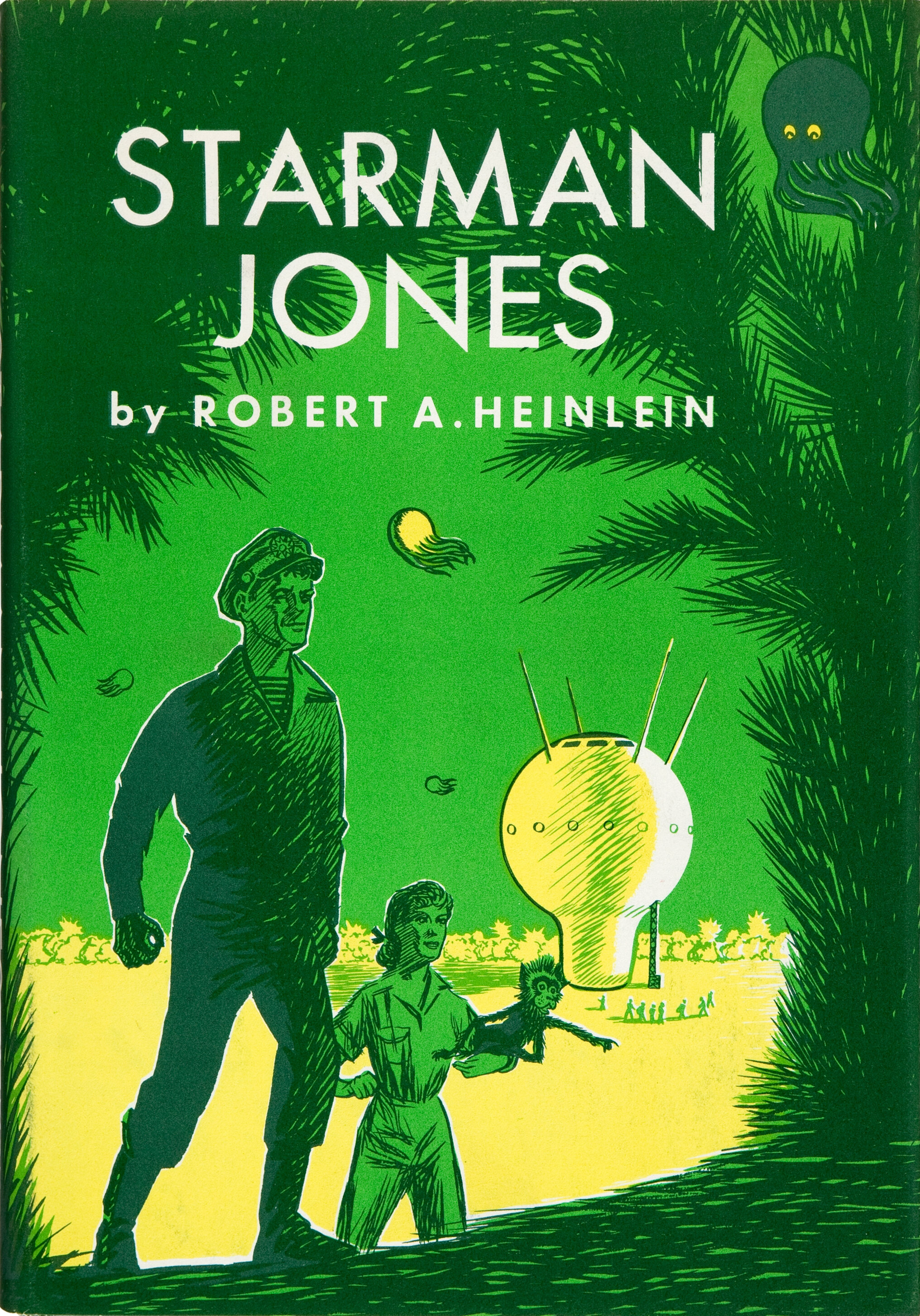
- First edition cover
- Author: Robert A. Heinlein
- Cover artist: Clifford Geary
- Language: English
- Series: Heinlein juveniles
- Genre: Science fiction
- Publisher: Scribner's
- Publication date: 1953
- Publication place: United States
- Media type: Print (hardback & paperback)
- Preceded by: The Rolling Stones
- Followed by: The Star Beast

Starman Jones, a 1953 science fiction novel by Robert A. Heinlein, features a farm boy who wants to go to the stars. Charles Scribner's Sons published the book as part of the Heinlein juveniles series.

== Plot summary ==
Max Jones works the family farm in the Ozark Mountains. With his father dead and his stepmother marrying a man he detests, Max runs away from home, taking his late uncle's astrogation manuals.

Most occupations are tightly controlled by guilds, with hereditary memberships. Since his uncle had been a member of the Astrogators' Guild and had had no children, Max hopes that before he died, his uncle had named him his heir. He begins hitchhiking towards Earthport to find out. Along the way, he finds a friendly face in hobo Sam Anderson, who later alludes to being a deserter from the Imperial Marines. Sam feeds Max and offers good advice, though he later steals Max's valuable manuals.

At the guild's headquarters, Max is disappointed to find that he had not been named as an heir, but he receives his uncle's substantial security deposit for his manuals. Max learns that Sam had returned the manuals and tried to claim the deposit for himself.

By chance, he runs into an apologetic Sam. With Max's money, Sam is able to finagle them jobs aboard a starship using forged records of service as crewmen aboard other starships. Max signs on as a steward's mate third class, and then he absorbs the contents of the Stewards' Guild manual using his eidetic memory. Among his duties is caring for several animals, including passengers' pets. When Eldreth "Ellie" Coburn visits her pet, an alien, semi-intelligent "spider puppy" that Max has befriended, she learns that he can play three-dimensional chess, and challenges him to a game. A champion player, she diplomatically lets him win. Meanwhile, Sam rises to the position of master-at-arms.

When, through Ellie's machinations, the ship's officers discover that Max had learned astrogation from his uncle, Max is promoted to the undermanned command deck. Under the tutelage of Chief Astrogator Hendrix and Chief Computerman Kelly, he becomes a probationary apprentice chartsman, then a probationary astrogator. In a meeting with Hendrix, Max reluctantly admits to faking his record to get into space. Hendrix defers the matter until their return to Earth. The Asgard then departs for Halcyon, a colony planet orbiting Nu Pegasi.

When Hendrix dies, the astrogation department is left dangerously shorthanded. The aging captain tries to take his place, but is not up to the task. When Max detects a critical error in his real-time calculations leading up to a transition (an instantaneous jump to another region of space), neither the captain nor Assistant Astrogator Simes believe him, and the ship becomes lost.

They locate a habitable world, which Ellie names Charity, and the passengers become colonists. Meanwhile, the crew continues to try to figure out where they are and whether they can return to Earth. Unfortunately, it turns out the planet is already inhabited by hostile centaur-like sapients. Max and Ellie are captured, but Ellie's pet is able to guide Sam to them. They escape, though Sam is killed covering their retreat. Upon his return, Max is informed that the captain has died. Simes tried to take command illegally and was killed by Sam, leaving Max as the only remaining astrogator. To make matters worse, Simes hid or destroyed the astrogation manuals.

Vastly outnumbered by the natives, the humans are forced to attempt a perilous return to known space by reversing the erroneous transition. Max must pilot the ship; he must also supply the missing astrogation tables from memory. To add to his burdens, the remaining officers inform Max that he must take command, as the captain must be an astrogator. The pressure is immense, but Max succeeds and the ship returns to known space.

Max pays heavy fines, but is allowed to join the Astrogators' Guild, and is assigned as an assistant astrogator aboard another starship. However, he loses any chance for a romantic relationship with Eldreth; she returns home to marry her boyfriend. Max accepts this with mixed feelings, but looks forward to his new career.

== Reception ==
Groff Conklin in 1954 found the novel to be "a richly textured and thoroughly mature tale" and the best of the seven Heinlein juveniles available. Anthony Boucher and J. Francis McComas praised it for its "good character-development, rousing adventure-telling, and brilliant creation of several forms of extra-Terrestrial life". P. Schuyler Miller ranked it "close to the best in mainline science fiction".

New York Times reviewer Villiers Gerson declared Starman Jones to be "superior science-fiction. ... carefully plotted, lucidly and beautifully written".

Surveying Heinlein's juvenile novels, Jack Williamson described Starman Jones as "a classic example of the bildungsroman pattern" and noted that "with its bold symbolism, the book makes a universal appeal". Despite "coincidence and occasional melodrama" in the plotting, Williamson concluded that "the novel is a fine juvenile [which] reflects hopes and fears we all have known".

Damon Knight wrote that in Starman Jones, "Heinlein is doing something more than just earning a living at the work he does supremely well: he's preparing a whole generation – the generation that will live to see the year 2000 – for the Age of Space that's as real to him now as it will be, must be, to them."

== Adaptation to other media ==
Although Heinlein rarely permitted dramatic adaptations of his work, he authorized Douglas L. Lieberman to stage Starman Jones at the Goodman Children's Theater in Chicago. Written and directed by Lieberman, the two-act play ran for 25 performances in 1972. The title role was played by Charles Fleischer, who later performed the voice of Roger Rabbit in Hollywood. In 1974, Avon Books published the script as part of the anthology Contemporary Children's Theater edited by Betty Jean Lifton.
