= Between Planets =

1951 SF novel by Robert A. Heinlein

- Cover of the first edition
- Author: Robert A. Heinlein
- Cover artist: Clifford Geary
- Language: English
- Genre: Science fiction
- Publisher: Charles Scribner's Sons
- Publication date: 1951
- Publication place: United States
- Media type: Print (Hardback & Paperback)
- Pages: 222
- Preceded by: Farmer in the Sky
- Followed by: The Rolling Stones

Between Planets is a juvenile science fiction novel by American writer Robert A. Heinlein, originally serialized in Blue Book magazine in 1951 as "Planets in Combat". It was published in hardcover that year by Scribner's as part of the Heinlein juveniles.

== Plot summary ==
Don Harvey's scientist parents withdraw him from his high school in New Mexico in the middle of the term so that he can join them on Mars. The headmaster suggests that they want him out of a potential war zone, where he might be viewed suspiciously because of doubts about his loyalties. At his parents' behest, he visits an old family friend who asks him to deliver a ring to his father; security forces later arrest both of them. Harvey is released and given his ring back, after it has been examined; he is told that his friend has died of "heart failure". Only later does he realize that all deaths can be described that way.

Harvey boards a shuttle to a space station orbiting Earth. The station doubles as a transshipment terminus and a military base, armed with missiles to keep restive nations in check. On the trip up, he befriends another passenger, a Venerian "dragon" calling himself "Sir Isaac Newton". Sir Isaac, a renowned physicist, can vocalize English using a portable device.

Harvey gets caught up in the Venerian war of independence when colonial forces capture the station in a surprise raid. Most of the other travelers are sent back to Earth, while a few decide to join the rebels. Harvey is in a quandary. The spaceship to Mars has been confiscated, but he remains determined to get there, by way of Venus if necessary. Because he was born in space, with one parent from Venus and the other from Earth, he claims Venerian citizenship; more importantly, Sir Isaac vouches for him. He is allowed to tag along, which turns out to be very fortunate for Harvey. The rebels blow up the station to stir up trouble for the Earth government. When the shuttle returns to Earth with its radios disabled, the military assumes it has been booby-trapped and destroys it, killing all aboard.

On his arrival on Venus, Harvey finds that his Earth-backed money is now worthless. A banker lends him money, telling him to pay it forward. He gets a job washing dishes for his keep for Charlie, a Chinese immigrant who runs a small restaurant. He befriends a young woman, Isobel, when he tries to send a message to his parents. However, communication with Mars has been cut due to the hostilities. Harvey settles in to wait out the war, but the war comes to him.

Earth sends a force to put down the rebellion on Venus. The Venerian ships are destroyed in orbit and the ground forces are routed. Charlie is killed resisting the occupying soldiers. Harvey is rounded up and questioned by a senior security officer, who is very eager to get his hands on Harvey's ring. Luckily, Harvey had given it to Isobel for safekeeping; he does not know where she is or whether she is even alive. Before he can be interrogated with drugs, he escapes and joins the Venerian guerrilla forces.

Harvey joins the army of the Republic and becomes an effective commando. In time, he is tracked down by the leaders of the resistance, who are also looking for the ring. Isobel and her father (an important member of the rebels) are safe at the very base where Harvey is taken.

The seemingly valueless ring turns out to contain the secret of scientific breakthroughs resulting from archaeological studies of an extinct alien civilization on Mars. With Sir Isaac's assistance, the rebels use the information to build an advanced spaceship that is much faster than any other vessel in existence, with revolutionary weapons and defenses also derived from the new technology. As a combat veteran, Harvey is recruited for the maiden voyage of Little David, manning a dead man's switch with strict orders to blow up the ship if it is in danger of capture. Little David intercepts and defeats a task force of warships on their way to Mars to crush the revolt there.

== Astronomy ==
Like many science fiction works of its period, the novel depicts both Venus and Mars as suitable for human habitation. Since no interplanetary space probes had been launched at the time, neither the extreme pressure and temperature at the surface of Venus, nor the extremely low atmospheric pressure at the surface of Mars, were known to science. Even the length of the day on Venus was not yet known.

== Reception ==
Groff Conklin reviewed the novel favorably, calling it "a magnificently real and vivid Picture of the Possible". Boucher and McComas named it among the best sf novels of 1951, characterizing it as "more mature than most 'adult' science fiction". P. Schuyler Miller praised the novel as "very smoothly and logically put together", although he noted that it lacked the level of "elaboration of background detail" that he expected from Heinlein.

Surveying Heinlein's juvenile novels, Jack Williamson characterized Between Planets as "mov[ing] the series still farther from its juvenile origins toward grownup concerns". Although describing the plot as "pretty traditional space opera", he praised the novel for its "ably drawn" characters, its "well-imagined" background, and its "story told with zest". Williamson also noted that Heinlein closed the novel "with a vigorous statement of his unhappiness with 'the historical imperative' leading to the loss of individual freedom as governmental organizations grew".

== Cartoon ==
Between Planets was serialized in Boys' Life magazine in 1978 as a monthly cartoon series. The story took some liberties — for instance, the "Dragons" of Venus were portrayed as humanoids and the planets' names were changed — but the spirit of the story was relatively faithful.
