= List of supreme deities =

Only or paramount deity of a religion

A supreme deity is the conception of the sole sovereign deity who is all powerful in a religion. It is common in monotheistic and henotheistic religions and sects. A supreme deity is often also a creator deity, while other deities are often aspects or manifestations of the supreme deity.

When the terms are used for polytheistic traditions, the deity is the main focus of devotion, but may not have overall supremacy. In monistic contexts, they are referred to as being the one supreme reality.

== African ==
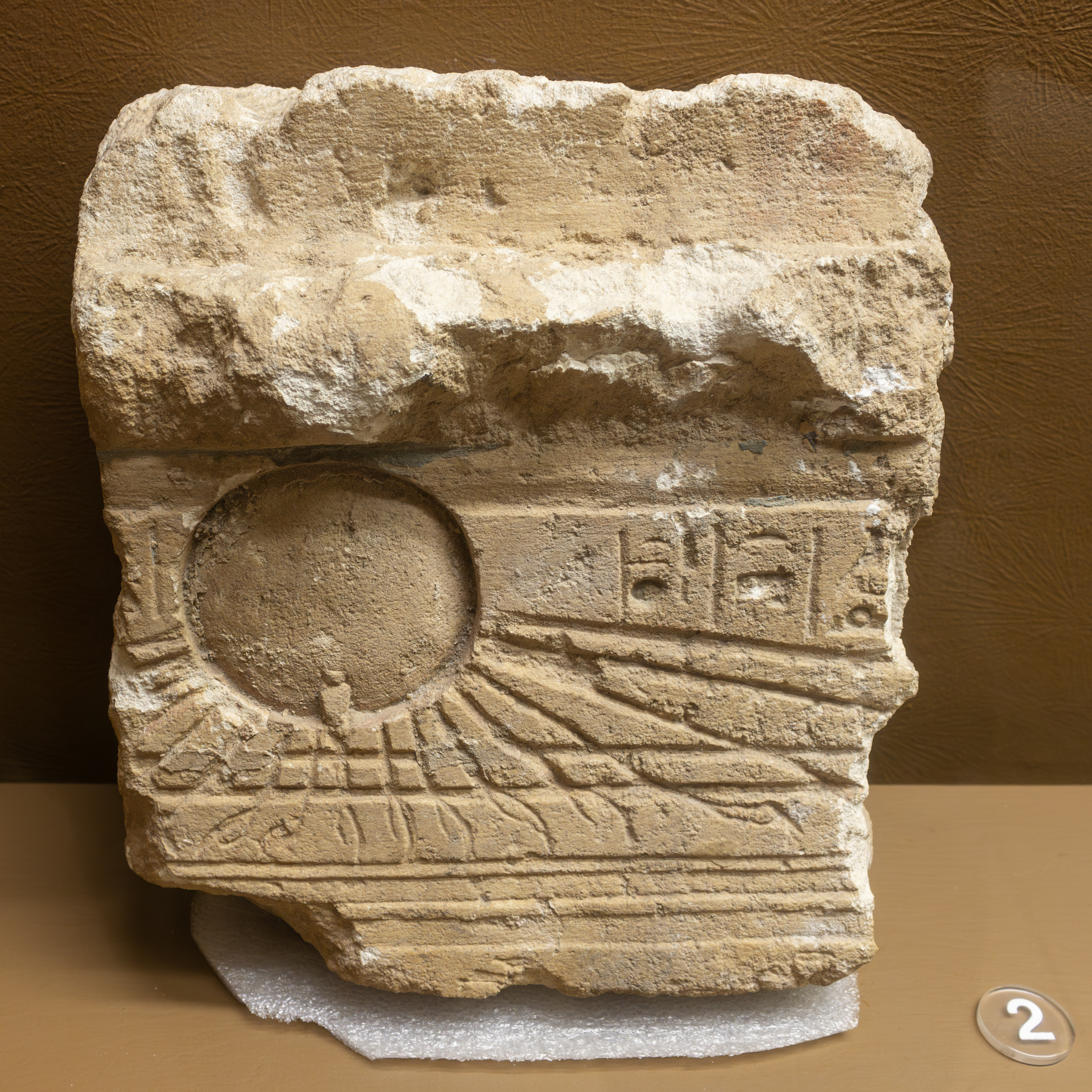
Aten as depicted in a lintel

- Aten, in Atenism
- Chukwu, in Odinani
- Mwari, in Shona religion
- Nyambe, in Bantu religions
- Nzambi, in Kongo religion
- Ọlọrun, in Isese
- Ruhanga, in Rutara religion

== Asian ==
Symbol of Wusheng Laomu

- Shangdi, in Shenism
- Wusheng Laomu/Wusheng Shengmu/Wujimu/Wuji Shengmu, in many Chinese salvationist religions such as Yiguandao.
- Yaochih Jinmu, in Cihui Tang.

== European ==
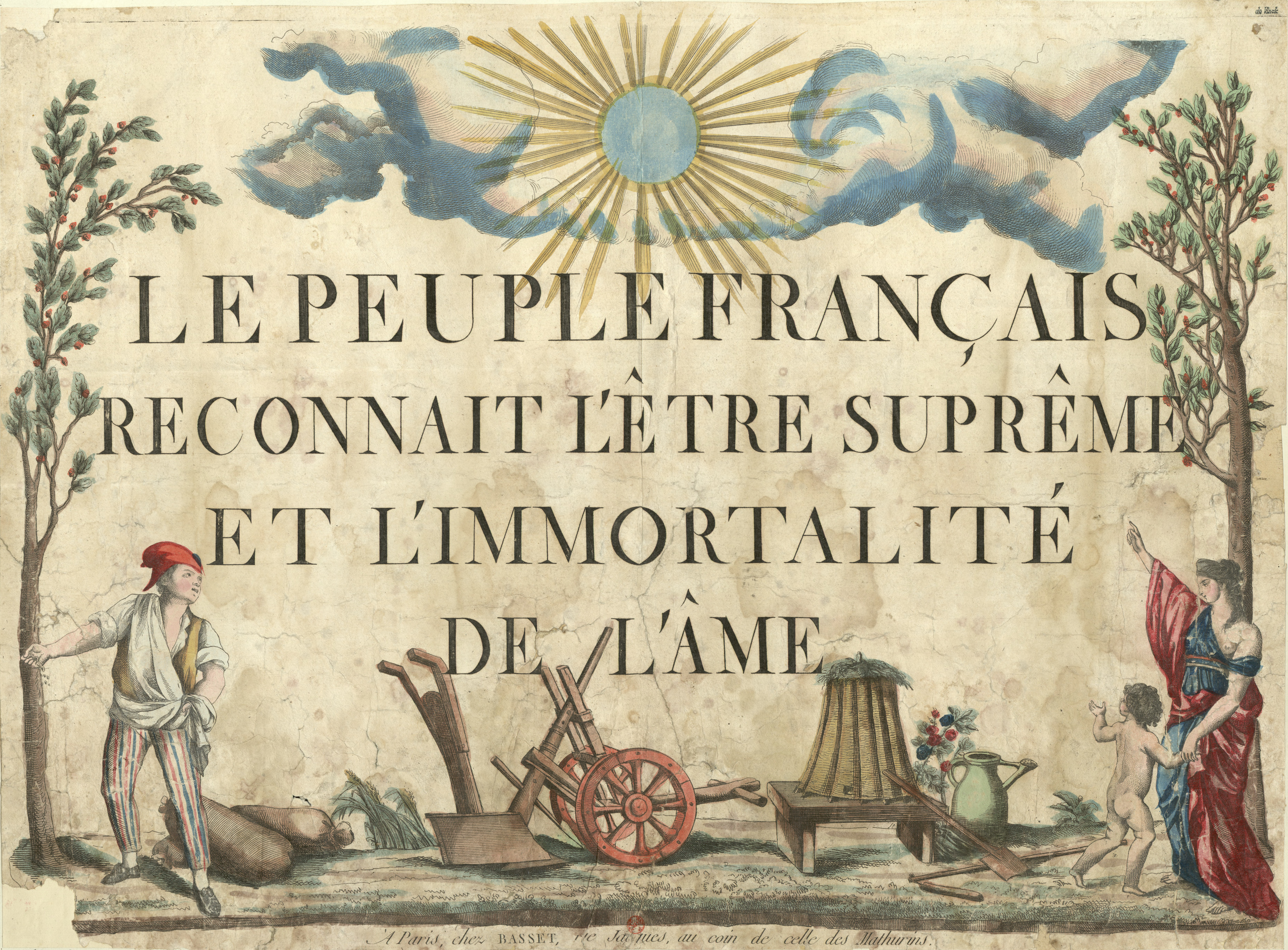
French Revolutionary depiction of the Supreme Being

- Supreme Being, in a deistic religion established by Maximilien Robespierre during the French Revolution
- Jupiter, in the Cult of Jupiter Summus Exsuperantissimus
- Rod, in some religions of syncretic Slavic neopaganism
- Ukko, in Ukonusko, a syncretic Finnish neopagan religion
- Zeus, in Middle Platonism

== Indian ==
- Para Brahman, in Hinduism
  - Indra, in Vedism
  - Shiva, in Shaivism
  - Vishnu (especially in Narayana tradition), in Vaishnavism
  - Adi Parashakti, in Shaktism
  - Maha Ganapati, in Ganapatya
  - Surya, in Sauram
- Adibuddha and Dharmakaya, in Mahayana Buddhism
- Waheguru, in Sikhism

== Middle Eastern ==
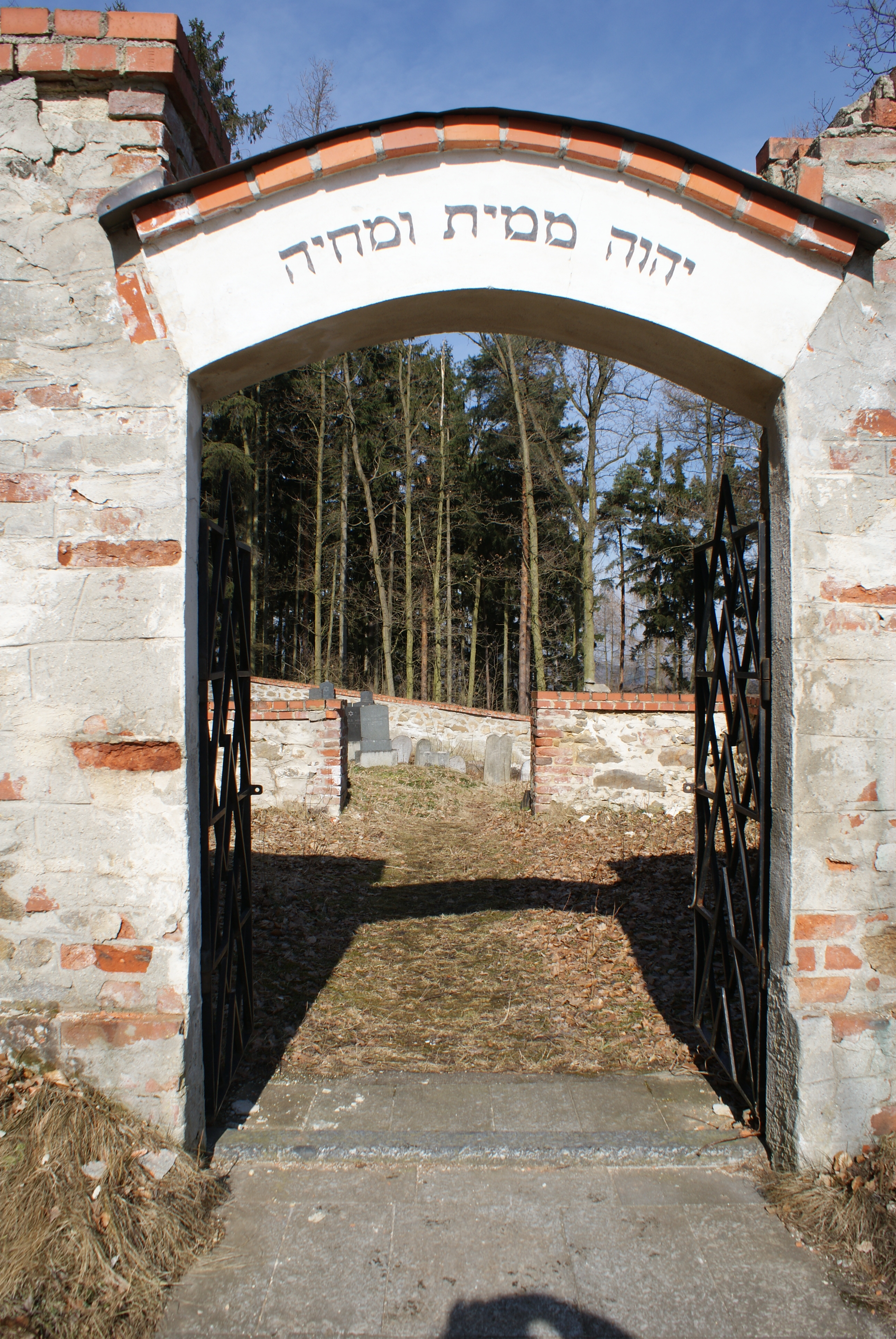
A cemetery with the text "Yahweh kills and makes alive" written in Hebrew on it

- God in Abrahamic religions
  - God in Judaism
  - God in Christianity
    - The Trinity in most Christian traditions
    - Jesus in some Christian traditions
  - Yahweh
  - Allah in Muslim belief: see God in Islam
  - Bahá in Bahá'í belief: see God in the Baháʼí Faith
- Hayyi Rabbi in Mandaeism

== In Freemasonry ==
The fraternity of Freemasonry generally requires that all initiates believe in some kind of supreme being or God, that is neutrally referred to as the Great Architect of the Universe.

Carl H. Claudy wrote in his 1931 work Introduction to Freemasonry:

He must declare his faith in a Supreme Being before he may be initiated. But note that he is not required to say, then or ever, what God. He may name Him as he will, think of Him as he pleases; make Him impersonal law or personal and anthropomorphic; Freemasonry cares not. [...] God, Great Architect of the Universe, Grand Artificer, Grand Master of the Grand Lodge Above, Jehovah, Allah, Buddha, Brahma, Vishnu, Shiva, or Great Geometer...

Henry Wilson Coil in his 1961 Encyclopaedia of Freemasonry outlined:

Men have to decide whether they want a God like the ancient Hebrew Yahweh, a partisan tribal god, with whom they can talk and argue and from whom they can hide if necessary, or a boundless, eternal, universal, undenominational, and international Divine Spirit so vastly removed from the speck called man, that he cannot be known, named or approached. [...] The Masonic test is a Supreme Being, and any qualification added is an innovation and distortion. [...] Monotheism violates Masonic principles, for it requires belief in a specific kind of Supreme Deity.

== See also ==
- Absolute (philosophy)
- Conceptions of God
- Deus otiosus
- Great Spirit
- High God
- Kathenotheism
- Monad (Gnosticism)
- Ultimate reality
- Unmoved mover
