= The Witch's Daughter (Robert Anson Heinlein) =

"The Witch's Daughters" is a 1946 poem by Robert A. Heinlein. It was first published in New Destinies vol. VI, 1988 and in Requiem, 1992.

The poem's title refers to the red-headed, green-eyed, pale-skinned "daughters of Lilith" who live for 800 years and then pop like a soap bubble. It takes the form of a warning to a young man to avoid them, as loving them can only lead to trouble.
