= Tunnel in the Sky =

1955 novel by Robert A. Heinlein

- First edition cover
- Author: Robert A. Heinlein
- Cover artist: P. A. Hutchinson
- Language: English
- Series: Heinlein juveniles
- Genre: Science fiction
- Publisher: Scribner's
- Publication date: 1955
- Publication place: United States
- Media type: Print (hardback & paperback)
- Pages: 227
- Preceded by: The Star Beast
- Followed by: Time for the Stars

Tunnel in the Sky is a juvenile science fiction novel by American writer Robert A. Heinlein, published in 1955 by Scribner's as one of the Heinlein juveniles. The novel follows a group of students participating in a survival test on an uninhabited planet, where they soon discover they are stranded.

== Plot summary ==
In the future, Malthusian overpopulation on Earth has been averted by the invention of teleportation, called the "Ramsbotham jump", which enables the excess population to colonize other planets. However, the cost of the technology means that colonies remain isolated from Earth until they can produce something to justify two-way trade. Because modern technology requires a supporting infrastructure, the colonists employ easily maintained technology similar to that of 19th century pioneers (such as Conestoga wagons and horses rather than tractors).

Rod Walker, a high-school student, dreams of becoming a professional colonist. The final test of his Advanced Survival class involves staying alive on an unfamiliar planet for between two and ten days. Students may team up and equip themselves with whatever gear they can carry, but they are otherwise completely on their own. They are told only that the challenges are neither insurmountable nor unreasonable. On test day, students walk through a Ramsbotham portal and find themselves alone on a strange planet, but reasonably close to the designated pickup point. Rod, acting on his older sister's advice, takes hunting knives and basic survival gear, avoiding high-tech weapons that might make him overconfident. The last advice that the students receive is to "watch out for stobor."

On the second day, a thief ambushes Rod and knocks him unconscious. He wakes up to find all that he has left is a spare knife hidden under a bandage. In his desperate concentration on survival, he loses track of time. Eventually, he teams up with Jacqueline "Jack" Daudet, a student from another class whom he initially mistakes for a male. When she tells him that more than ten days have elapsed without contact, he realizes that something has gone wrong and they are stranded.

Rod and Jack start recruiting other survivors to build a settlement for long-term survival, and Rod becomes the de facto leader of a community that eventually grows to around 75 people. Disagreements reveal the need to elect a government for the new town. Rod has no taste for politics or administration and is happy to have Grant Cowper, an older college student and born politician, elected as mayor. Grant proves to be much better at talking than getting things done. Despite disagreeing with many of Grant's policies, Rod supports him. Grant ignores Rod's warning that they are living in a dangerously hard-to-defend location and that they should move to a cave system that he has found. When an indigenous species that the humans had regarded as harmless suddenly changes its behavior and stampedes through the camp, the settlement is devastated and Grant is killed. The citizens elect Rod as their new mayor.

Heinlein tracks the social development of the frontier community of educated young Westerners deprived of technology, followed by their society's abrupt dissolution when Earth reestablishes contact. After nearly two years of isolation, the culture shock experienced by the survivors highlights for them and the reader the pain and uncertainty of becoming an adult by reversing the process abruptly. Each of the students returns from being a self-responsible member of an autonomous community to being regarded as a youth.

All of the students go back to Earth willingly enough except for Rod, who has great difficulty reverting from the status of head of a small but sovereign state to a teenager whom the adult rescuers casually brush aside. However, his teacher (and now brother-in-law) and his sister persuade him to change his mind. His teacher also informs Rod that his warning against "stobor" was just a way of personalizing the dangers of an unknown planet to instill fear and caution in the students, as all students receive the same warning, regardless of the planet they are sent to for the final exam.

Years later, Rod accomplishes his heart's desire: leading a formal colonization party to another planet.

== Themes ==
As in Lord of the Flies, which had been published a year earlier, isolation reveals the true natures of the students as individuals, but it also demonstrates some of the constants of human existence as a social animal. Its underlying themes run counter to those in Lord of the Flies, however, in that it shows a belief in the inherent strength of humans as proto-adults who can self-organize rather than descend into barbarism. Some of the students fall victim to their own foolishness, and others turn out to be thugs, but that is a part of human nature, just as the counter-trends take the group as a whole towards the beginnings of a stable society. The numerous political crises of the fledgling colony illustrate the need for legitimacy in a government appropriate for the society it administers, another common theme in Heinlein's books. In both its romanticization of the pioneer and its glorification of Homo sapiens as the toughest player in the Darwinian game, it presages themes developed further in books like Time Enough for Love and Starship Troopers. Unusual for science fiction at the time, but quite typical of Heinlein's works, the novel portrays several competent and intelligent female characters.

The earlier part of the book makes a reference to a war – some generations before the book's plot begins – in which China conquered and colonized Australia. The remnants of Australia's original population – evidently referring to both Aboriginal Australians and European-descended Australians – were evacuated to New Zealand. The Chinese then engaged in a giant engineering project to reclaim Australia's central desert, but it soon became a vast overpopulated slum. In the book's present, the Chinese are colonizing marginal planets with harsh conditions, which nobody else wants, miserable peasants forced to move there against their will. All that has little bearing on the book's main plot, serving mainly to demonstrate the strong Malthusian pressures which inflicted Earth until the way to colonize other planets by matter transmitter was found.

== Rod's ethnicity ==
Heinlein Society member and researcher Robert James has noted that Heinlein wrote a letter in which he "firmly states" that Rod Walker is black. According to James, "The most telling evidence is that everybody in 'Tunnel' expects Rod to end up with Caroline, who is explicitly described as black." In recognition of this, the cover illustration of a full cast audio version of the work was revised to "show Rod with his correct ethnicity". Rod's ethnicity being black can be validated by cross-checking Heinlein's statements in his published correspondence, specifically from Heinlein Archives in PDF archive CORR087 on page 923. Here in conversation with Sandra Jane Fulton he explicitly states that the hero of Tunnel in the Sky is a Negro boy, and he continues on to speak about racism in the following paragraphs and the fact that he parted ways with his publisher at that time due to their attitudes concerning this topic.
