= Requiem (short story collection) =

1992 retrospective on Robert A. Heinlein

Cover art of Requiem

Requiem: New Collected Works by Robert A. Heinlein and Tributes to the Grand Master (1992, ISBN 0-312-85168-5, TOR Books) is a retrospective on Robert A. Heinlein (1907–1988), after his death, edited by Yoji Kondo.

== Table of contents ==
- Preface — Virginia Heinlein
- Editor's Foreword — Yoji Kondo

Part I — Works of Robert A. Heinlein

- "Requiem"
- "Tenderfoot in Space"
- "Destination Moon"
- "Shooting Destination Moon"
- "The Witch's Daughters"
- "The Bulletin Board"
- "Poor Daddy"
- Guest of Honor Speech at the Third World Science Fiction Convention — Denver, 1941
- Guest of Honor Speech at the XIXth World Science Fiction Convention — Seattle, 1961
- Guest of Honor Speech — Rio de Janeiro Movie Festival, 1969
- Guest of Honor Speech at the XXXIVth World Science Fiction Convention — Kansas City, 1976

Part II — National Air and Space Museum Heinlein Retrospective — 6 October 1988

- NASA Medal for Distinguished Public Service for Robert A. Heinlein
- Our Noble, Essential Decency, retitled This I Believe — read by Virginia Heinlein
- Speeches by the Panelists:
  - Tom Clancy
  - L. Sprague de Camp
  - Jerry Pournelle
  - Charles Sheffield
  - Jon McBride
- Speeches by the Special Guests:
  - Catherine Cook de Camp
  - Tetsu Yano

Part III — Tributes to Robert A. Heinlein

- Poul Anderson — RAH: A Memoir
- Jim Baen — Jim Baen's RAH Story
- Greg Bear — Remembering Robert Heinlein
- J. Hartley Bowen, Jr. — Recalling Robert Anson Heinlein
- Arthur C. Clarke — Robert Heinlein
- Gordon R. Dickson — Robert Heinlein
- Joe Haldeman — Robert A. Heinlein and Us
- Larry Niven — The Return of William Proxmire
- Spider Robinson — Rah Rah R.A.H.!
- Spider Robinson — Robert
- Robert Silverberg — Heinlein
- Harry Turtledove — Thank You
- Jack Williamson — Who Was Robert Heinlein?
- Yoji Kondo and Charles Sheffield — Farewell to the Master
