= Poor Daddy =

- Short story by Robert A. Heinlein
- Country: United States
- Language: English
- Genre: Young adult fiction

Publication
- Published in: Calling All Girls
- Publication type: Magazine
- Publication date: 1949

"Poor Daddy" is a short story by American writer Robert A. Heinlein.

Unlike his usual output, it is not science fiction, but is intended as a modern story for young girls. It was printed in the magazine Calling All Girls in 1949, and reprinted in the posthumous collection Requiem.

The story is similar in style and tone to Heinlein's better-known story "The Menace from Earth".

== Plot summary ==
Maureen, or "Puddin'", a strong-willed, intelligent teenage girl, observes the interplay between her parents over the mother's new-found enthusiasm for ice dancing. Maureen's father is an unworldly university professor, while her mother is a practical polymath who, amongst other accomplishments, designed and built the family home.

Maureen's father goes on a fishing trip. On his return, he announces that ice dancing is a simple matter of applied physics, and that anybody can do it. A competent skater herself, Maureen watches in horror as he puts on skates and ventures out on the ice with a partner. As he approaches the critical first turn, she prepares herself, as she puts it, to "identify the body". However, her father negotiates the hazard and finishes the dance, not without a few wobbles.

Later, Maureen announces to her father that she has solved the puzzle. His "fishing trip" was really a crash course in ice dancing. He could not stand to see his wife dancing with other, younger men, but was too proud to learn at home. Maureen indicates that she could, given sufficient motivation, keep the secret to herself. A pair of famous-name skates is her price for silence.

== See also ==
- Heinlein juveniles
