= The Return of William Proxmire =

1989 short story by Larry Niven

"The Return of William Proxmire" is a short story by Larry Niven first published in 1989 in the anthology What Might Have Been? Volume 1: Alternate Empires, edited by Gregory Benford.

The short story was reprinted in Niven's collection N-Space, as well as the Robert A. Heinlein retrospective Requiem.

== Plot summary ==
The point-of-view character, a physicist with a time-travel theory, is approached by retired Senator William Proxmire. Proxmire has come up with a scheme to abolish such money-wasters (as Proxmire views them) as space travel. His plan is simple; many of those who worked for or advocated space travel cited the science fiction of Robert A. Heinlein as their inspiration. However, the iconic writer only began his career after being discharged from the United States Navy due to tuberculosis. If a time traveler were to cure Heinlein, he would presumably remain in the military and this impact on history would be negated.

Sure enough, the scheme is carried out. However, Proxmire finds out that he has not succeeded as well as he would have liked. Although Heinlein's absence from the literary world of the new timeline did neutralize the science fiction magazines of the 1950s, other authors took Heinlein's place just a decade later – in mainstream literary magazines such as The New Yorker. Science fiction thus gained an air of respectability, and inspired people to even greater achievements. Proxmire's political career ended when this culture of science fiction fans boycotted Wisconsin cheese in response to his Golden Fleece Awards.

The new timeline is far more technologically advanced; solar power satellites can be seen in the night sky, a lunar colony exists, and a mission to Mars is underway. The healthy Heinlein turned out to be as skilled an officer as he would have been an author, and is now an admiral with great influence over an equally healthy space program – he denies the Russians spacecraft, but has placed a number of cosmonauts on the Mars mission as payment for fusion bombs to be used in the ship's ORION drive.

== Reception ==
"Return" was a finalist for the 1990 Hugo Award for Best Short Story. In 2010, however, Strange Horizons described it as "execrably toothless satire", calling it "desperately unfunny, unsophisticated, self-congratulatory stuff" that "reeks (...) of crassness", while science fiction scholar Brooks Landon considered that what was most remarkable about the story was "its faith that Robert Heinlein was such an exceptional individual that his life would have changed the future no matter what his occupation."
