= Time for the Stars =

1956 juvenile science fiction novel by Robert A. Heinlein

- First Edition cover
- Author: Robert A. Heinlein
- Cover artist: Clifford Geary
- Language: English
- Series: Heinlein juveniles
- Genre: Science fiction
- Publisher: Scribner's
- Publication date: 1956
- Publication place: United States
- Media type: Print (hardback & paperback)
- Preceded by: Tunnel in the Sky
- Followed by: Citizen of the Galaxy

Time for the Stars is a juvenile science fiction novel by American writer Robert A. Heinlein, published by Scribner's in 1956 as one of the Heinlein juveniles. The basic plot line is derived from a 1911 thought experiment in special relativity, commonly called the twin paradox, proposed by French physicist Paul Langevin.

== Plot summary ==
The Long Range Foundation (LRF), a non-profit organization that funds expensive, long-term projects for the benefit of mankind that nobody else will even consider, has built a dozen exploratory torchships to search for habitable planets to colonize. The vessels can continually accelerate, but cannot exceed the speed of light, so the voyages will last many years. Each starship has a much larger crew than necessary to maintain a more stable, long-term shipboard society, as well as to provide replacements for the inevitable deaths.

The LRF has found that some twins and triplets can communicate with each other telepathically. The process seems instantaneous and unaffected by distance, making it the only practical means of communication for ships traveling many light-years away from Earth. Before announcing the discovery, the Foundation first recruits as many of these people as it can. Testing shows that teenagers Tom and Pat Bartlett have this talent, and both sign up. Pat, the dominant twin, manipulates things so that he gets selected as the crew member, much to Tom's annoyance. However, Pat does not really want to leave, and his subconscious engineers a convenient accident so that Tom has to take his place at the last minute.

On board, Tom is pleased to find that his uncle Steve, a soldier, has arranged to get assigned to the same ship. The trip is fraught with problems – as trivial as an annoying roommate and as serious as mutiny. The ship visits several star systems, including Beta Hydri. Due to the nature of relativistic travel (see twin paradox), the twin who remained behind ages faster and eventually the affinity between them weakens to the point where they can no longer communicate easily. Some of the spacefaring twins, including the protagonist, are able to connect with descendants of the Earth-based twins. Tom works first with his niece, then his grandniece, and finally his great-grandniece.

The last planet scouted proves particularly deadly. Unexpectedly intelligent and hostile natives capture and kill a large portion of the remaining crew, including the captain and Tom's uncle. The reserve captain takes charge, but is unable to restore the morale of the devastated survivors. When he insists on continuing the mission rather than returning to Earth, members of the crew begin to consider mutiny. Shortly after the new captain notifies Earth of the dire situation, the crew learn to their surprise that a spaceship will rendezvous with them in less than a month; they surmise it must be a much more advanced spaceship. Scientists on Earth have discovered faster-than-light travel, in part due to research into the nature of telepathy, and are collecting the surviving crews of the torchships. They are returned to an Earth they no longer recognize, and in most cases, no longer fit into. Tom, however, returns to marry his latest telepathic partner, his own great-grandniece, who states she has been reading his mind since childhood.

== Reception ==
Galaxy reviewer Floyd C. Gale praised the novel as "an engrossing yarn", saying "The plot twists will take you by surprise and the characterizations delight you."
