= The Star Beast (novel) =

1954 SF novel by Robert A. Heinlein

- First edition cover for The Star Beast
- Author: Robert A. Heinlein
- Cover artist: Clifford Geary
- Language: English
- Series: Heinlein juveniles
- Genre: Science fiction
- Publisher: Scribner's
- Publication date: 1954
- Publication place: United States
- Media type: Print (hardback and paperback)
- Preceded by: Starman Jones
- Followed by: Tunnel in the Sky

The Star Beast is a 1954 science fiction novel by Robert A. Heinlein about a high school senior who discovers that his extraterrestrial pet is more than it appears to be. The novel was originally serialized, somewhat abridged, in The Magazine of Fantasy & Science Fiction (May, June, July 1954) as Star Lummox and then published in hardcover as part of Scribner's series of Heinlein juveniles.

== Plot summary ==
In the future, Earth has had interstellar spaceflight for centuries and has made contact with numerous intelligent alien species. Teenager John Thomas Stuart XI lives in a small Rocky Mountain town, Westville, and cares for Lummox, an extraterrestrial beast his great-grandfather had brought home. Lummox has learned how to speak, and has gradually grown from the size of a collie pup to a ridable behemoth—especially after consuming a used car. The childlike Lummox is perceived as a neighborhood nuisance and, upon leaving the Stuart property one day, causes substantial property damage across the city. John's widowed mother wants him to get rid of it, and brings an action in the local court to have it destroyed.

Eventually, the court orders Lummox destroyed. City officials try several methods to kill Lummox but fail, as its alien physiology appears to be virtually invulnerable to ordinary weapons or poisons, and Lummox does not even realize they are attempting to execute him. Desperate to save his pet, John Thomas considers selling Lummox to a zoo. He quickly changes his mind and runs away from home, riding into the nearby wilderness on Lummox's back. His girlfriend, Betty Sorenson, joins him and suggests bringing the beast back into town and hiding it in a neighbor's greenhouse. However, it is not easy to conceal such a large creature.

Meanwhile, at the Earth government Department of Spacial Affairs, Mr. Kiku, the Permanent Undersecretary and an expert diplomat, is dealing with the Hroshii, a previously unknown, advanced, and powerful alien race. They demand the return of their lost child, or they will destroy Earth. A friendly alien diplomat of a third species intimates that the threat is not an empty one. Initially, no one associates Lummox with the newcomers, partly due to the size difference (Lummox grew very large from overfeeding). Lummox is finally identified as important Hroshii royalty, and is approximately female (the Hroshii have six sexes). It turns out that the friendship between John Thomas and Lummox may be the only thing saving Earth from destruction. From her viewpoint, during her centuries on Earth, the young, extremely long-lived Lummox has been pursuing a hobby: the raising of John Thomases. She makes it clear to the other Hroshii that she intends to continue doing so. This gives Mr. Kiku the leverage he needs to establish diplomatic relations. At the insistence of Lummox, the newly married John and Betty accompany her back to the Hroshii homeworld as part of Earth's diplomatic mission.

== Reception ==
Damon Knight wrote:

This is a novel that won't go bad on you. Many of science fiction's triumphs, even from as little as ten years ago, are unreadable today; they were shoddily put together, not meant for re-use. But Heinlein is durable. I've read this story twice, so far – once in the Fantasy and Science Fiction serialized version, once in hard covers – and expect to read it again, sooner or later, for pleasure. I don't know any higher praise.

Groff Conklin described the novel as "one of Heinlein's most enchanting tales". P. Schuyler Miller found The Star Beast "one of the best of 1954".

== Illustrations ==
The F&SF serialization has a series of illustrations by Fred Kirberger (two covers plus black-and-white interior art). Although the secondary protagonist, Mr. Kiku, is clearly described in the text as a black Kenyan, he is illustrated as a white man. Lummox and the other Hroshii are only depicted as vague shapes or textures at the edges of some scenes.

The original Scribner's hardcover edition has cover art and a frontispiece by Clifford Geary that depicts Lummox.
