= Tom Corbett, Space Cadet =

Fictional character

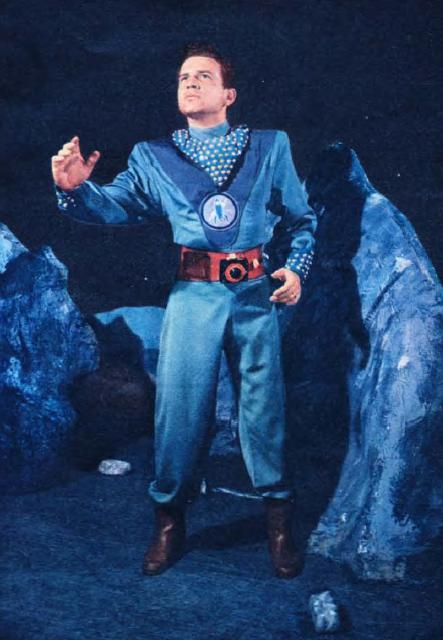
- Frankie Thomas as Tom Corbett in the TV-series Tom Corbett, Space Cadet
- Author: Carey Rockwell
- Language: English
- Genre: Science fiction novel
- Publisher: Grosset & Dunlap
- Publication date: 1952
- Publication place: United States

Tom Corbett is the main character in a series of Tom Corbett—Space Cadet stories that were depicted in television, radio, books, comic books, comic strips, and other media in the 1950s.

The stories followed the adventures of Corbett, Astro, and Roger Manning (originally; later, T.J. Thistle), cadets at the Space Academy as they train to become members of the Solar Guard. The action takes place at the Academy in classrooms and bunkrooms, aboard their training ship the rocket cruiser Polaris, and on alien worlds, both within the Solar System and in orbit around nearby stars.

== Origin ==
Joseph Greene of Grosset & Dunlap developed Tom Corbett, Space Cadet, inspired by the Robert A. Heinlein novel Space Cadet (1948) but based on his own prior work. Greene had submitted a radio script for "Tom Ranger" and the "Space Cadets" on January 16, 1946, but it remained unperformed when Heinlein's novel was published. Greene then reworked his radio script into a script for a daily newspaper adventure strip, which was never produced.

== Television ==
The character appeared in the TV-series Tom Corbett, Space Cadet (1950–1955).

== In other media ==
=== Books ===
The books from 1952–1956 were published by Grosset & Dunlap, written by unknown authors under the pseudonym Carey Rockwell, with Willy Ley as technical advisor.

1. Stand By for Mars (1952)
2. Danger in Deep Space (1953)
3. On the Trail of the Space Pirates (1953)
4. The Space Pioneers (1953)
5. The Revolt on Venus (1954)
6. Treachery in Outer Space (1954)
7. Sabotage in Space (1955)
8. The Robot Rocket (1956)

In 1953 a slim children's book titled Tom Corbett's Wonder Book of Space (or Tom Corbett: A Trip to the Moon) was written by Marcia Martin and published by Wonder Books.

=== Comic strip ===
The Tom Corbett — Space Cadet comic strip, drawn in Milton Caniff style by Ray Bailey, ran Sunday and daily in American newspapers, from September 9, 1951 to September 6, 1953. Paul S. Newman scripted through February 8, 1953. The strips from September 9, 1951 to July 31, 1952 were republished by Eternity Comics as five issues of The Original Tom Corbett, Space Cadet.

=== Comic books ===
The original Tom Corbett series was published by Dell Comics beginning in their Four Color series, which was used to try out new story lines on the public to obtain feedback. After three tryout issues, Corbett moved to a standalone title which began numbering at #4. Corbett was also featured in a 1953 issue of Boys and Girls March of Comics, published by the K.K. Publications imprint of Western Publishing, with which Dell was partnered. As the popularity of the television series waned, Dell stopped producing the comic book at #11 in 1954, and the series was taken up in 1955 by Prize Comics for three issues. All eleven Dell issues were reprinted in black and white by the UK based World Distributors, with some cover rearrangements and material omissions. The Dell standalone issues were re-released digitally—albeit not in publication order—by Bluewater Comics as Tom Corbett: Space Cadet Classics in 2014–2015. In 2017, PS Artbooks released two volumes as part of their "Pre-Code Classics" line, collecting the first seven Dell issues in volume one, and the remaining four Dell issues along with the three Prize issues in volume two.

There were two four-issue manga-style Tom Corbett, Space Cadet mini-series released by Eternity Comics in the 1990, eventually followed by two four-issue Tom Corbett: Space Cadet mini-series released by Bluewater Comics in 2009 and 2012–2013.

Dell Comics (February 1952–September–November 1954)

- Dell 4-Color #378 "Titan Sabotage"
- Dell 4-Color #400 "Space Pirates"
- Dell 4-Color #421 "Colonists of Space Colony Io"
- Tom Corbett, Space Cadet #4 "Lost Race of Asorians"
- Tom Corbett, Space Cadet #5 "The Smugglers of the Moon"
- Tom Corbett, Space Cadet #6 "Blue Men of Tara"
- Tom Corbett, Space Cadet #7 "The Space Traitor"
- Tom Corbett, Space Cadet #8 "Spaceship Graveyard"
- Tom Corbett, Space Cadet #9 "The World of Deep Waters"
- Tom Corbett, Space Cadet #10 "Asteroid Treasure Hunt"
- Tom Corbett, Space Cadet #11 "The Forbidden Planet"

K.K. Publications

- Boys and Girls March of Comics (1953), #102 "Slavers of Space"

World Distributors

- Tom Corbett, Space Cadet (1953–1954) #1–11

Prize Comics (May 1955–October 1955)

- Tom Corbett, Space Cadet v2 #1

- "The Spaceship of Doom"
- "Octopus Tree"
- "The Spaceways of Peril"

- Tom Corbett, Space Cadet v2 #2

- "The Outlaws of Uranus"
- "The Invaders"
- "Wolf Planet"

- Tom Corbett, Space Cadet v2 #3

- "Dangerous Cargo"
- "The Drifter"
- "The Craters of Mercury"

Eternity Comics (1990)

- Tom Corbett, Space Cadet - Book One
- Tom Corbett, Space Cadet - Book Two
- The Original Tom Corbett, Space Cadet

Bluewater Comics

- Tom Corbett: Space Cadet v1 (2009), #1–4
- Tom Corbett: Space Cadet v2 (2012–2013), #1–4 "Danger in Deep Space"
- Tom Corbett: Space Cadet Classics (2014–2015), #1–8

PS Artbooks

- Tom Corbett, Space Cadet v1
- Tom Corbett, Space Cadet v2

=== Radio ===
The cast for the radio program was the same as for the television series. It ran from January 1-June 26, 1952, as a half-hour show twice a week, on Tuesday and Thursday. Each story line would start on Tuesday and end on Thursday. Many of the radio episodes were based on television episodes. A radio version produced in Australia used local actors.

The radio drama company The Colonial Radio Theatre on the Air produced two "radio dramatization" audio versions of BlueWater/Tidalwave titles, Tom Corbett Space Cadet (2012), and Tom Corbett Space Cadet: Danger in Deep Space (2013).

== Music ==
There was also a musical recording, "Tom Corbett, Space Cadet, Song and March" in 1951 ("Space Cadet Song” b/w an instrumental version called "Space Cadet March"). These were performed by the "Space Cadet Marching Band and Chorus" (in reality, studio musicians directed by Columbia Records executive Mitch Miller) and released on Simon & Schuster's Golden Records kiddie label.

== Toys and tie-ins ==
There is a Tom Corbett, Space Cadet View-Master packet containing three reels. Its three-dimensional photographs feature sculptures of the characters and models of the spacecraft and props. The story sees them finding a miniature pyramid on the moon made by unknown aliens. This leads to a clue on Mars and, finally, to fighting interplanetary crooks in the asteroid belt.

There are also several coloring books, a flashlight, a punch-out book, a costume for children, a lunch box, a pocket watch, a Space Academy playset with plastic figures, a set of rubber molds for making plaster-of-Paris figurines from Marx toys, a Little Golden Book, and a Little Golden Record of the Space Academy song ("From the rocket fields of the academy / to the far flung stars of outer space / we are space cadets training to be / ready for dangers we may face"). Two other records presented Space Cadet adventures, starring the original TV/radio cast: Tom Corbett, Space Cadet at Space Academy and Rescue in Space: Tom Corbett, Space Cadet.

Kellogg's Pep Cereal featured cardboard cutouts of a space cadet cap, gauntlets, and a ray gun, and the cereal company made a direct tie-in with the product Kellogg's Pep: The Solar Cereal. Kellogg's also published a four-page Tom Corbett, Space Cadet News, Vol. 1 #1 as a 23x15 inch newspaper, folded in half.

The show was the subject of a parody, "Lawrence Fechtenberger, Interstellar Officer Candidate", a serial that made several appearances on programs of Bob and Ray.

== Bibliography ==
- David Weinstein, The Forgotten Network: DuMont and the Birth of American Television (Philadelphia: Temple University Press, 2004) ISBN 1-59213-245-6
- Alex McNeil, Total Television, fourth edition (New York: Penguin Books, 1980) ISBN 0-14-024916-8
- Tim Brooks and Earle Marsh, The Complete Directory to Prime Time Network TV Shows, third edition (New York: Ballantine Books, 1964) ISBN 0-345-31864-1
