= A Tenderfoot in Space =

Short story by Robert A. Heinlein

- Short story by Robert A. Heinlein
- Country: United States
- Language: English
- Genre: Science fiction

Publication
- Published in: Boys' Life
- Publication date: May–July 1958

"A Tenderfoot in Space" is a short story by Robert A. Heinlein, serialized in Boys' Life magazine in May, June, and July 1958. The original working title was "Tenderfoot on Venus" when it was written in 1956. It was extensively cut according to orders by the magazine editor for its published form. It was reprinted in the 1992 retrospective Requiem: New Collected Works by Robert A. Heinlein and Tributes to the Grand Master.

== Synopsis ==
A boy and his dog emigrate to Venus. The boy joins a local Scout troop, learning how to survive in the Venusian wilderness, with its various dangers.

== Publication information ==
- Robert A. Heinlein (May 1958). "A Tenderfoot in Space Part 1". Boys' Life – via Google Books.
- Robert A. Heinlein (June 1958). "A Tenderfoot in Space Part 2". Boys' Life – via Google Books.
- Robert A. Heinlein (July 1958). "A Tenderfoot in Space Part 3". Boys' Life – via Google Books.
