= Paul S. Newman =

American writer (1924–1999)

- Born: April 29, 1924 New York City, U.S.
- Died: May 30, 1999 (aged 75) Columbia, Maryland, U.S.
- Area: Writer
- Notable works: Turok
- Awards: Inkpot Award, 1998; Bill Finger Award for Excellence in Comic Book Writing 2021 (posthumously)

Paul S. Newman (April 29, 1924 – May 30, 1999) was an American writer of comic books, comic strips, and books, whose career spanned the 1940s to the 1990s. Credited in the Guinness Book of World Records as the most prolific comic-book writer, with more than 4,100 published stories totaling approximately 36,000 pages, he is otherwise best known for scripting the comic-book series Turok for 26 years.

== Biography ==
=== Early life and career ===
Newman was born in New York City, the son of Mr. and Mrs. Joseph J. Newman. He served his World War II military service in the Po Valley campaign in Italy, earning a service star as an enlisted man in a bomb disposal unit, and, later, as a first lieutenant special-services officer aboard troop transports. Following his discharge, he attended Dartmouth College, graduating in 1947.

That same year, Newman broke into comic books with DC Comics' teen-humor series A Date with Judy, based on the radio program, for which Newman had originally applied to write. He went on to script for Avon Comics, Fawcett Comics, Hillman Periodicals, St. John Publications, Ziff Davis, and, as a staff writer, at Marvel Comics' two predecessor companies, Timely Comics and Atlas Comics.

At Timely/Atlas, where he and other staff writers were officially titled editors, Newman worked on the teen-humor series Patsy Walker, Hedy Devine and Jeannie under editor-artist Al Jaffee. Under Atlas editor-in-chief Stan Lee, he wrote stories (generally uncredited, as were virtually all those of the staff writers) for such horror/mystery titles as Journey into Mystery and Marvel Tales, as well as for romance titles.

Turok, whose uncredited creation is disputed, debuted in an issue of the omnibus title Four Color Comics and, after a second issue in that series, continued as issue No. 3 of Turok, Son of Stone (the first issue of that series under its own name), published by Western Publishing — first through its business partner Dell Comics and then through its own label, Gold Key Comics. The uncredited Newman was one of the series' writers, along with Gaylord DuBois, from its inception in 1954.

Newman had an additional decades-long run on the character the Lone Ranger, in the Dell Comics comic-book series. With artist Tom Gill, Newman chronicled the adventures of the radio, television and comic-strip Western hero from #38–145 (April 1948 – July 1962), the final issue.

=== Silver Age of comics ===
In 1962, Newman and Western Publishing editor Matt Murphy created the character Doctor Solar. Later that decade, Newman wrote the comic-book adaptation of the Beatles' animated feature Yellow Submarine. By the 1980s, he was writing for the DC Comics series G.I. Combat and House of Mystery; for the Disney comic Darkwing Duck; and industrial films and audio-visual presentations.

=== Comic strips ===
Newman wrote the September 9, 1951 – February 8, 1953, Sundays and dailies of the comic strip adaptation of Tom Corbett, Space Cadet, drawn by Ray Bailey. Newman additionally wrote issues of Dell Comics' Tom Corbet comic book.

Among his other strips are Laugh-In (with artist Roy Doty), based on the TV show; Smokey Bear; Robin Malone; and The Lone Ranger.

=== Big Little Books and Whitman Authorized Editions ===
Newman was also the credited writer of numerous entries in Western Publishing Company's Big Little Book series for children, including writing licensed spin-off works based upon the TV series, The Invaders and the comic book character, Aquaman. He also wrote for Western's line of Whitman "Authorized Edition" hardcovers for young readers; among his works included a novel based upon the TV series, Gunsmoke.

== Awards and accolades ==
Newman won a 1998 Inkpot Award for his lifetime contribution to the comic-book field. He was a 1997 nominee for the Will Eisner Award Hall of Fame.

The Guinness Book of World Records credits Newman as the most prolific comic-book writer, with more than 4,100 published stories totaling approximately 36,000 pages.

Newman was a posthumous recipient of the Bill Finger Award for Excellence in Comic Book Writing in 2021. In 2026, Newman was selected for inclusion in the Eisner Hall of Fame.

== Personal ==
In 1985, the once-divorced Newman married his second wife, Carol Wernick, project coordinator of youth leadership for the New York City Board of Education. The ceremony by Rabbi Max Ticktin took place at Newman's New York City home. Newman was the father of two children, Peter Newman and Lisa Newman. Newman died of a heart attack in Columbia, Maryland, where he and his wife lived.

== Bibliography ==
=== Dell Comics ===
- Dell Four Color (series 2) #540 (March 1954).
- Dell Four Color (series 2) #567, #650 (June 1954, September 1955)
- Dell Four Color (series 2) #610 (January 1955)
- Dell Four Color (series 2) #614 (February 1955)
- Dell Four Color (series 2) #624 (April 1955)
- Dell Four Color (series 2) #684 (March 1956).
- Dell Four Color (series 2) #688 (May 1956)
- Dell Four Color (series 2) #717 (August 1956)
- Dell Four Color (series 2) #820 (June 1957)
- Dell Four Color (series 2) #824 (August 1957)
- Dell Four Color (series 2) #946 (August 1958)
- "Hercules", Four Color (series 2) #1006 (July 1959)
- "Hercules", Four Color (series 2) #1121 (August 1960)
- Dell Four Color (series 2) #1145 (September–November 1960)
- Dell Four Color (series 2) #1158 (January 1961)
- Dell Four Color (series 2) #1255 (1961)
- Dell Movie Classic: Jason and the Argonauts (August–October 1963)
- "Twice-Told Tales", Dell Movie Classics #840 (November 1963-January 1964)
- "Zulu", Dell Movie Classics #12-950-410 (August–October 1964)
- Dell Movie Classic: Ensign Pulver (August–October 1964)
- Dell Movie Classic: Two on a Guillotine (April–June 1965)
- Dell Movie Classic: Around the World Under the Sea (December 1966)
- Dell Movie Classic: The Great Race (March 1966)

=== Gold Key Comics ===
- Gold Key: How the West Was Won (July 1963)
- Gold Key: 55 Days at Peking (September 1963)
- X: The Man with the X-ray Eyes (Gold Key Comics, 1963)
- The Fall of the Roman Empire (Gold Key Comics, 1964)
- Rio Conchos (Gold Key Comics, 1965)
- Those Magnificent Men in Their Flying Machines (Gold Key Comics, 1965)
- Fantastic Voyage (Gold Key Comics, 1967)
- Beatles - Yellow Submarine (Gold Key Comics, 1968)
- Beneath the Planet of the Apes (Gold Key Comics, 1970)
