= Carl H. Claudy =

American novelist (1879–1957)

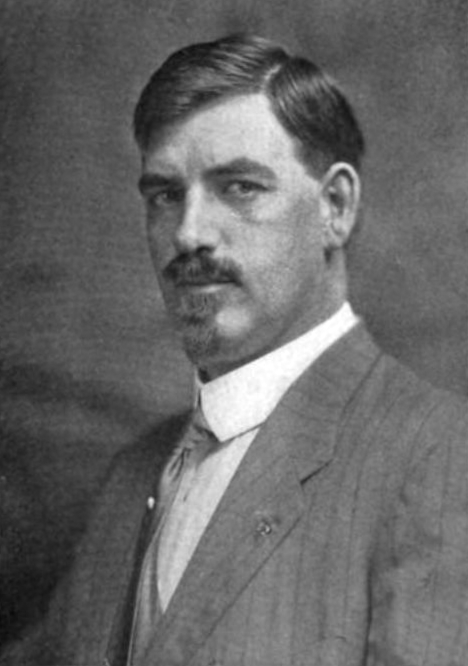
- Born: Carl Harry Claudy; January 13, 1879; Washington, D.C.
- Died: May 27, 1957 (aged 78); Washington, D.C.
- Occupation: Writer

Carl Harry Claudy (January 13, 1879 – May 27, 1957) was an American author, magazine writer, and journalist for the New York Herald.

He wrote a number of books relating to photography and to aviation, including First Book of Photography: A Primer of Theory and Prize Winners' Book of Model Airplanes. During the early 1900s, Claudy photographed many important aeronautical events such as Alexander Graham Bell's tetrahedral kite experiments and the Wright Flyer Army Trials at Fort Myer, Virginia.

Claudy wrote many science fiction stories for The American Boy magazine during the early 1930s. Four novelization books were printed from some of those stories. From 1939 to 1941, he wrote for DC Comics.

He was also a Masonic leader, speaker, playwright, and essayist who wrote several handbooks for Masons.

== Life and career ==
Claudy was born on January 13, 1879, in Washington, D.C. At the age of 19 he was pioneer and prospector in Alaska.

After returning from Alaska in the early 1900s, Claudy took work as an editor for various magazines including American Inventor 1900 until 1904, Prism from 1908 until 1909, Cathedral Calendar from 1921 until 1927 and The Master Mason from 1924 until 1930. It was also in the early 1900s that Claudy was an avid photographer and photographed several significant events, particularly in the area of aviation. He photographed the Wright Flyer Army Trials in Fort Myer, Virginia, in 1909. He also worked as a free-lance writer and aviation correspondent for the New York Herald.

In 1911, Claudy was the director of publicity for the National Highway Association.

He died in Washington, D.C., on May 27, 1957.

== Claudy as a Freemason ==
Claudy's association with Freemasonry began in 1908, when, at the age of 29, he was raised a Master Mason in Lodge Harmony No. 17 in Washington, DC. He served as its Master in 1932 and eventually served as Grand Master of Masons in the District of Columbia in 1943.

His Masonic writing career began in earnest when he became associated with the Masonic Service Association in 1923, serving as associate editor of its magazine, The Master Mason, until 1931. Under his leadership the Masonic Service Association was brought to a place of preeminence through his authorship and distribution of the Short Talk Bulletin which made his name familiar to virtually every lodge in the country. He authored approximately 350 Short Talk Bulletins. In addition to the bulletins themselves, he wrote and distributed innumerable digests, special bulletins, and portfolios of an historical and factual nature.

== Bibliography ==
=== General ===
- The Battle of Base-ball

=== Science fiction ===
- The Mystery Men of Mars
- A Thousand Years a Minute
- The Land of No Shadow
- The Blue Grotto Terror

=== Freemasonry ===
- Pocket Masonic Dictionary
- Foreign Countries
- Old Tiler Talks
- The Old Past Master
- A Master's Wages
- These Were Brethren
- Where Your Treasure Is
- The Lion's Paw
- Masonic Harvest
- Introduction to Freemasonry – Vol. I Entered Apprentice
- Introduction to Freemasonry – Vol. II Fellowcraft
- Introduction to Freemasonry – Vol. III Master Mason
- The Master's Book
- Washington's Home and Fraternal Life (1931)
