= List of fictional astronauts (early period) =

Lists of fictional astronauts
Early period	Project Mercury	Project Gemini
Project Apollo	1975–1989	1990–1999
2000–2009	2010–2029	Moon
Inner Solar System	Outer Solar System	Other
Far future

The following is a list of fictional astronauts as imagined before the Space Age. The astronauts on this list appear in stories released prior to or shortly after the inception of Project Mercury in 1958.

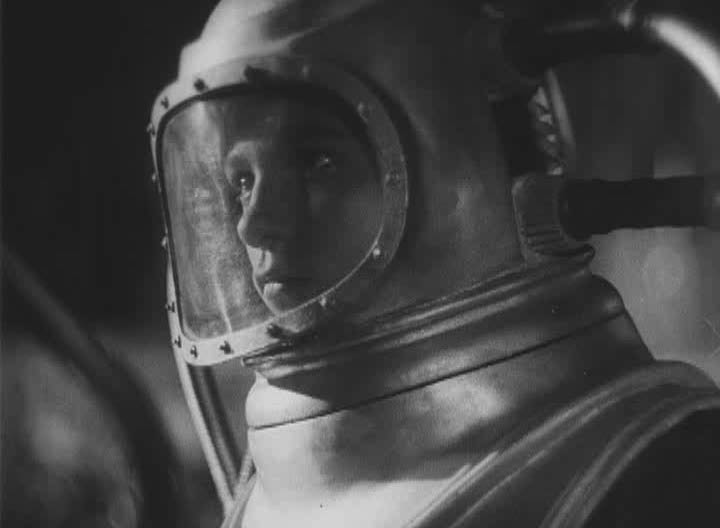
Marina (actress Ksenia Moskalenko) in Cosmic Voyage (1936 Soviet silent film)

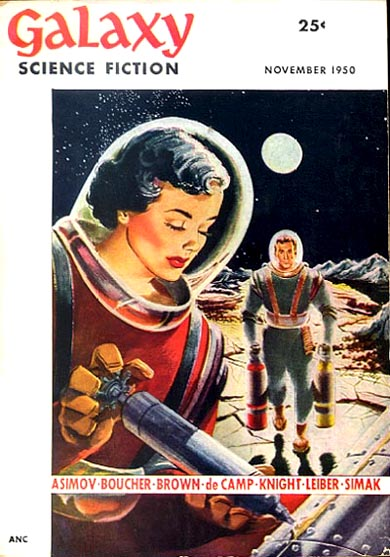
Cold War romance on the Moon in "Honeymoon in Hell" (1950 short story by Fredric Brown)

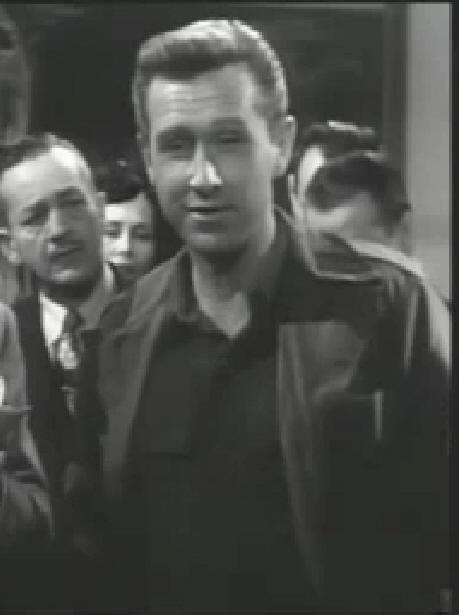
Col. Floyd Graham (actor Lloyd Bridges) in Rocketship X-M (1950 film)

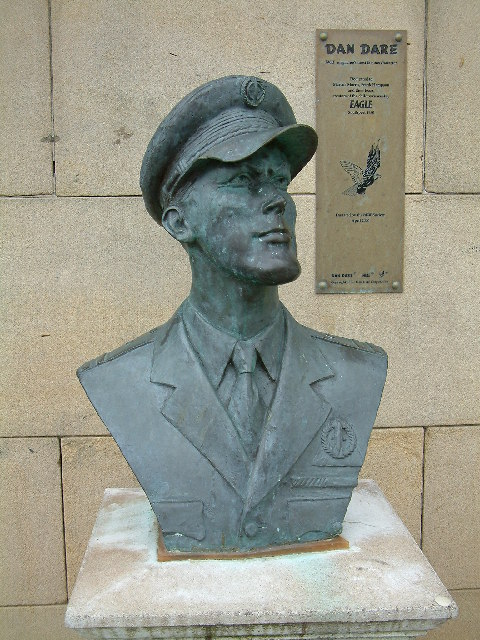
Bust of Dan Dare in Lord Street, Southport

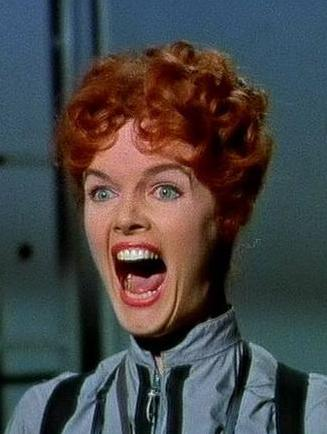
Dr. Iris Ryan (actress Naura Hayden) screams in The Angry Red Planet (1959 film)

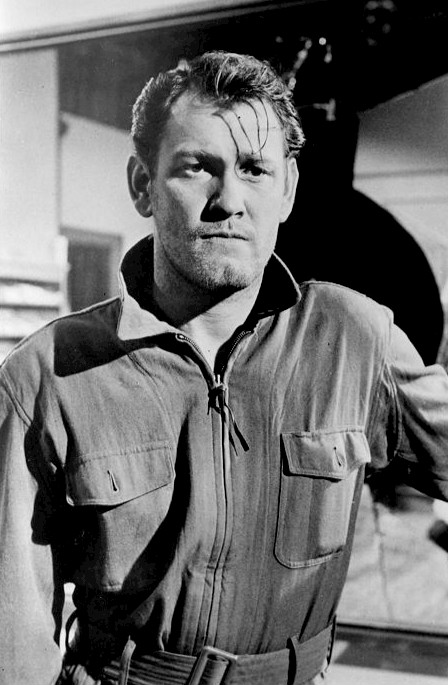
Mike Ferris (actor Earl Holliman), unaware he is an astronaut trainee in Where Is Everybody? (1959 episode of The Twilight Zone)

== Early period ==
Name(s)	Appeared in	Program / Mission / Spacecraft	Fictional date
Wan Hu	Scientific American (1909)	N/A	2000 BC
Wan Hu	Wan Hu was a legendary Chinese official who was said to have become the first astronaut by reaching space using a chair affixed with several dozen rockets. The earliest known version of the story comes from a 1909 edition of Scientific American, which names the official as "Wang Tu" and dates his voyage to "about 2,000 years B.C.", more than 3,000 years before the invention of gunpowder rockets in China. A more popular version of the tale widely disseminated by Herbert Zim in 1945 dates Wan Hu's flight to the less anachronistic time of the sixteenth century.		
Georg Manfeldt, Prof. Walter Turner; Wolf Helius (Engineer); Friede Velten (Student Astronomer); Hans Windegger (Engineer)	Woman in the Moon (1929), silent film	Friede	Contemporary?
Georg Manfeldt, Prof. Walter Turner; Wolf Helius (Engineer); Friede Velten (Student Astronomer); Hans Windegger (Engineer)	First film depiction of a Moon rocket and of a countdown. Checkerboard design and Frau-im-Mond logo later to appear on A4 rockets.		
Selenite: Roger Colt; Phil Gershom; Edmond Beverly Holdane expedition: Holdane (leader) (no first name given); Unnamed crewmembers	"Master of the Asteroid" (1932), short story	Selenite Holdane expedition	1980 2010
Selenite: Roger Colt; Phil Gershom; Edmond Beverly Holdane expedition: Holdane (leader) (no first name given); Unnamed crewmembers	Colt, Gershom and Beverly, three of the fifteen scientists at the Syrtis Major rocket base on Mars, steal the Selenite in an attempt to reach Jupiter when they begin to find Mars too crowded. Thirty years later, the Holdane expedition finds the wreckage of the Selenite on the asteroid Phocea.		
Harrison (US) (Captain/Astronomer); Dick Jarvis (US) (Chemist); Pierre Leroy (France) (Biologist); Karl Putz (Germany) (Engineer)	"A Martian Odyssey" (1934), "Valley of Dreams" (1934), short stories	Ares	21st century
Harrison (US) (Captain/Astronomer); Dick Jarvis (US) (Chemist); Pierre Leroy (France) (Biologist); Karl Putz (Germany) (Engineer)	First men on Mars; landing site in Mare Cimmerium. Cardoza made first voyage to Moon ten years earlier; "de Lancey flight" to Venus was unsuccessful.		
Gloria Mundi: Dale Curtance (Commander/Pilot); Geoffrey Dugan (Assistant Pilot/Navigator); James Burns (Engineer); Froud (Journalist) (no first name given) "Doc" Grayson, Dr. (Physician/Biologist) (no first name given); Joan Shirning (Stowaway) Tovaritch: Karaminoff, Commissar (Commander) (no first name given); Vasiloff (no first name given); Six unnamed crewmembers US spacecraft: Unnamed crewmembers	Planet Plane (a.k.a. Stowaway to Mars, The Space Machine) (1935), novel	Gloria Mundi (UK) Tovaritch (Soviet Union) Unnamed spacecraft (Keuntz company, US)	March 9, 1981 – October 1982
Gloria Mundi: Dale Curtance (Commander/Pilot); Geoffrey Dugan (Assistant Pilot/Navigator); James Burns (Engineer); Froud (Journalist) (no first name given) "Doc" Grayson, Dr. (Physician/Biologist) (no first name given); Joan Shirning (Stowaway) Tovaritch: Karaminoff, Commissar (Commander) (no first name given); Vasiloff (no first name given); Six unnamed crewmembers US spacecraft: Unnamed crewmembers	Space travelers compete for "Keuntz Prize" for first successful interplanetary journey. Duncan, K. K. Smith and Sudden were first to reach the Moon but crashed fatally on lunar surface. Richard Drivers flew around the Moon and returned to Earth in 1969, but later died with unnamed crewmate in attempt to reach Venus. Jornsen crashed in Pacific Ocean; Simpson piloted Keuntz company rocket which exploded near Chicago with great loss of life on the ground. Launch of Gloria Mundi from Salisbury Plain on October 12, 1981; landing south of Martian equator; return to Earth in North Africa on April 7, 1982. Gloria II later disappeared with Curtance, Froud and unnamed crewmates while attempting to reach Venus.		
Pavel Ivanovich Sedikh, Prof. (Scientist); Marina, Prof. (Assistant)	Cosmic Voyage (a.k.a. Cosmic Journey, The Space Ship, The Space Voyage) (1936), film	Soviet Union	1946
Pavel Ivanovich Sedikh, Prof. (Scientist); Marina, Prof. (Assistant)	Scientist and assistant are joined by young stowaway on first voyage to Moon.		
Burns, Prof. (no first name given); Lee Baron (Balloonist)	"Once Around the Moon" (1937), short story	N/A	Contemporary
Burns, Prof. (no first name given); Lee Baron (Balloonist)	Professor and balloonist are launched by space gun to circumnavigate the Moon.		
Unnamed (President/Secretary/Treasurer); Ivan Schnitzel (Photographer); Isaac Guzzbaum (Auditor); Eric Wobblewit (Humourist); Two unnamed crewmembers	"How We Went to Mars" (1938), short story	Snoring-in-the-Hay Rocket Society (UK): Pride of the Galaxy	April 1952
Unnamed (President/Secretary/Treasurer); Ivan Schnitzel (Photographer); Isaac Guzzbaum (Auditor); Eric Wobblewit (Humourist); Two unnamed crewmembers	Amateur crew of first crewed spaceflight accidentally reach Mars. Landing near Solis Lacus.		
Luna Spaceport: DeWitt, Maj. (Commander) (no first name given); John Tallentyre, Maj. (Second-in-command); Noel Crispin (File clerk); Ernie Moessner (Mechanic) Ship Number Six: Waddell (Spacehand, first-class, acting skipper) (no first name given); Unnamed crewmember Ship Number Forty-Two: O'Hara (Spacehand) (no first name given); Unnamed crewmembers Ship Number Forty-Five: Dague (Engineer) (no first name given); Ethel (Stowaway) (no last name given); Unnamed crewmembers Ship Number Sixty-One: Sturgis Riser, Capt. (Skipper); Joe Moessner; Three unnamed crewmembers World League Police: Baynes, Inspector; Dunlap, Constable (no first names given) Mars base: Grayson (Commander); Hudson (no first names given)	"Men Against the Stars" (1938), short story	World League; Rocket Service: Luna Spaceport; Ships Number One to Sixty-One; Mars base	1998
Rockets to Mars repeatedly explode due to unstable atomic hydrogen fuel developed by scientist Joseph Moessner. Moessner's younger brother was killed in 1961 trying to reach the Moon; Luna Port was built in 1996, with launches to Mars commencing in 1997. Only four of first fifty-six ships landed safely on Mars. Joe Moessner replaces Riser as skipper of Number Sixty-One.
Matsugawa Venus Crystal Company: Wesley P. Miller (Superintendent, Group A); Koenig (Note: Implied to be Superintendent, Group B.); Kenton J. Stanfield (US) (Operative A-49); Frederick N. Dwight (Operative B-9); Anderson; Markheim; Bailey; Unnamed personnel	"In the Walls of Eryx" (1939), short story	Venus Crystal Company: Terra Nova (post); Scouting Plane FR-58 (Note: Also referred to as FH-58.); Repair Plane PG-7	Future (from March 18)
Matsugawa Venus Crystal Company: Wesley P. Miller (Superintendent, Group A); Koenig; Kenton J. Stanfield (US) (Operative A-49); Frederick N. Dwight (Operative B-9); Anderson; Markheim; Bailey; Unnamed personnel	Crystal prospectors on Venus, 72 years after humans first reached that planet. Matsugawa mapped Venus from the air 50 years earlier.		
Farley (last name not given)	"The Rocket of 1955" (1939), short short story	Unknown	1955
Farley (last name not given)	Mars-bound astronaut, who discovers too late that his spacecraft is the product of a gigantic confidence trick; killed when it explodes during liftoff.		
John Harman	"Trends" (1939), short story	Prometheus New Prometheus	July 14, 1973 – April 1978 (Note: The story ends a month after Easter, which fell on March 26 in 1978.)
John Harman	Harman makes the first circumnavigation of the Moon in the face of intense religious and governmental opposition.		
James "Mac" McIntyre, Capt. (Pilot); Charles Cummings (Engineer); Delos David "D. D." Harriman (Note: Middle name given in The Man Who Sold the Moon (q.v.).) (Passenger)	"Requiem" (1940), short story	Lunatic	c. 1980s/1990s
James "Mac" McIntyre, Capt. (Pilot); Charles Cummings (Engineer); Delos David "D. D." Harriman (Passenger)	The elderly Harriman, the man whose company made space travel possible, makes one last attempt to fulfill his lifelong dream of traveling to the Moon. Part of Robert Heinlein's "Future History" series. Adapted into 1955 X Minus One episode.		
Erik Vane; Michael (no last name given); Lida (no last name given)	"Space Episode" (1941), short story	Ares	Future
Erik Vane; Michael (no last name given); Lida (no last name given)	Attempt to reach Mars is aborted by meteor impact.		
Chamberlain, Dr. (Atomic scientist); Russell, Maj. (US Army); Reynolds, Maj. (Communications)	Arch Oboler's Plays; Rocket from Manhattan (1945), radio play	XR-1	September 20, 2000
Chamberlain, Dr. (Atomic scientist); Russell, Maj. (US Army); Reynolds, Maj. (Communications)	Crew returning from first crewed Moon expedition witnesses atomic war break out on Earth. Chamberlain is a former Manhattan Project scientist. Adapted into 1956 play Night of the Auk (q.v.).		
R. S. Goshawk: Hicks (Captain) "Noisy" Rhysling (Jetman, Second Class); Unnamed personnel Falcon: Unnamed captain Unnamed Master-at-Arms; Archie Macdougal (Chief Jetman); Unnamed personnel	"The Green Hills of Earth" (1947), short story	Harriman Company/Trust (Hawk-class): R. S. Goshawk; Falcon (passenger vessel)	c. 1980s – 2000s
R. S. Goshawk: Hicks (Captain) "Noisy" Rhysling (Jetman, Second Class); Unnamed personnel Falcon: Unnamed captain Unnamed Master-at-Arms; Archie Macdougal (Chief Jetman); Unnamed personnel	After losing his sight in shipboard accident, Rhysling becomes the "Blind Singer of the Spaceways". Part of Heinlein's "Future History" series. Adapted into 1950 Dimension X episode, featuring additional Goshawk crewmen named Mike Hertzmann (a wiper, later Chief Jetman on the Falcon) and "Jimmy Legs" Casey (the bosun), and into 1955 X Minus One episode.		
David (no last name given)	"Inheritance" (1947), short story	A.15; A.20 (David/Goliath); A.21	Near Future
David (no last name given)	Welsh test pilot on suborbital rocket flights from Atlas Mountains in Africa.		
Galileo: Donald Morris "Doc" Cargraves, Sc.D. (Captain); Maurice "Morrie" Abrams (Second-in-command/co-pilot); Ross Jenkins (Flight engineer); Arthur Mueller (Medical officer/radar/radio) Wotan/Moonbase: Helmut von Hartwick, Lt. Col. ("Elite Guard") (Executive Officer); Unnamed lieutenant (Utility rocket commander); Friedrich Lenz (Sergeant-Technician, 2nd Class) (Utility rocket pilot); 49 unnamed crewmembers	Rocket Ship Galileo (1947), novel	Galileo "New Reich": Wotan (later renamed City of Detroit); Thor; Utility rocket Moonbase	Near Future (Note: The year "1959" appears in an illustration on p. 19. The book definitely takes place after 1951 (p. 48).)
Galileo: Donald Morris "Doc" Cargraves, Sc.D. (Captain); Maurice "Morrie" Abrams (Second-in-command/co-pilot); Ross Jenkins (Flight engineer); Arthur Mueller (Medical officer/radar/radio) Wotan/Moonbase: Helmut von Hartwick, Lt. Col. ("Elite Guard") (Executive Officer); Unnamed lieutenant (Utility rocket commander); Friedrich Lenz (Sergeant-Technician, 2nd Class) (Utility rocket pilot); 49 unnamed crewmembers	Scientist Cargraves and his teenaged crew discover Nazi moonbase west of Oceanus Procellarum.		
Hicks (Pilot) Supra-New York: Shorty Weinstein (Computer); Unnamed psychiatrist Flying Dutchman: Kelly (Captain); Jake Pemberton (First Pilot); Unnamed personnel Space Terminal: Soames (Commodore-Pilot) Gremlin: Jake Pemberton (Pilot)	"Space Jockey" (1947), short story	Trans-Lunar Transit: Supra-New York (Satellite station); Space Terminal (Moon orbiting station) Earth-to-Moon spacecraft: Flying Dutchman (Flight 27); Philip Nolan Winged rockets: Skysprite; Firefly Moon landing rockets: Gremlin; Moonbat	c. 1980s
Hicks (Pilot) Supra-New York: Shorty Weinstein (Computer); Unnamed psychiatrist Flying Dutchman: Kelly (Captain); Jake Pemberton (First Pilot); Unnamed personnel Space Terminal: Soames (Commodore-Pilot) Gremlin: Jake Pemberton (Pilot)	While piloting passengers and freight to Moon, Pemberton is distracted by marital troubles and an unruly child passenger. Part of Heinlein's "Future History" series.		
Sam Houston Adams; Thomas Dooley; Maurice Feinstein; Hazel Hayakawa; Kurt Schaeffer; G. Washington Slappey	"The Black Pits of Luna" (1948), short story	Unknown	August 11, 1984 / c. 2000
Sam Houston Adams; Thomas Dooley; Maurice Feinstein; Hazel Hayakawa; Kurt Schaeffer; G. Washington Slappey	In backstory, scientists are killed in 1984 explosion of atomic lab on lunar farside near Rutherford. Part of Heinlein's "Future History" series.		
Rocket number seventeen (Russia): Mikichenko (no first name given) Rocket number nineteen (US): George Vincent Quinn; Rocket number twenty (US): John J. Armstrong	Dreadful Sanctuary (1948), serial; (1951), novel	Unknown (Russia, United States)	1972
Rocket number seventeen (Russia): Mikichenko (no first name given) Rocket number nineteen (US): George Vincent Quinn; Rocket number twenty (US): John J. Armstrong	Pilot Quinn and inventor Armstrong commandeer Moon-rockets to prevent third world war. Quinn makes first crewed Moon landing in Copernicus. Significantly revised for 1963 paperback edition.		
Unnamed captain William Cole (a.k.a. William Saunders) (Chief Communications Officer/Relief pilot); Tom Sandburg (Junior communications officer)	"Ordeal in Space" (1948), short story	Valkyrie	c. 2000
Unnamed captain William Cole (a.k.a. William Saunders) (Chief Communications Officer/Relief pilot); Tom Sandburg (Junior communications officer)	Traumatized by spacewalk accident during passenger run to Mars, Cole becomes acrophobic and changes his name in an attempt to start a new life on Earth. Part of Heinlein's "Future History" series.		
Wilson; Louis Garnett	"The Sentinel" (1948), short story	Unknown	1996
Wilson; Louis Garnett	Explorers who discover something remarkable on the shores of the Sea of Crises.		
Unnamed crewman	"Cold War" (1949), short story	United States: Space Stations	Near Future
Unnamed crewman	With the United States operating nine atomic-armed Space Stations to enforce world peace, the U.S. president visits a former Space Station crewman in a holding cell, one of five who became criminally insane after returning home on leave.		
Space Station One: "Tiny" Larsen (Superintendent) "Dad" Witherspoon (Assistant superintendent); Gloria Brooks "Brooksie" McNye (Chief Communications Engineer); Robert Dalrymple (Chief Inspector); Hammond (Radioman); Jimmie (Timekeeper) (no last name given); McAndrews (Shipfitter); O'Connor (Metalsmith); Peters (Radioman); Unnamed personnel R. S. Half Moon: Don Shields (Captain)	"Delilah and the Space-Rigger" (1949), short story	Harriman Enterprises (owner)/Five Companies, Incorporated (contractor): Space Station One R. S. Half Moon (supply ship); Pole Star (supply ship)	c. 1980s
Space Station One: "Tiny" Larsen (Superintendent) "Dad" Witherspoon (Assistant superintendent); Gloria Brooks "Brooksie" McNye (Chief Communications Engineer); Robert Dalrymple (Chief Inspector); Hammond (Radioman); Jimmie (Timekeeper) (no last name given); McAndrews (Shipfitter); O'Connor (Metalsmith); Peters (Radioman); Unnamed personnel R. S. Half Moon: Don Shields (Captain)	Construction crew of first space station is surprised by arrival of female communications engineer. Part of Heinlein's "Future History" series.		
Destiny I: Korby (no first name given); Sweeny (no first name given) Destiny II: Korby; Sweeny; Anthony Marinetta; Johnny Pritchard (Air Corps)	"Flaw" (1949), short story	Destiny I Destiny II Destiny III	1959 – 1964
Destiny I: Korby (no first name given); Sweeny (no first name given) Destiny II: Korby; Sweeny; Anthony Marinetta; Johnny Pritchard (Air Corps)	"Atomic drive" is perfected in 1960. Destiny I makes first circumnavigation of Moon c. 1960; Destiny II launches from Arizona rocket station in February for 14-month Mars flyby mission.		
Unnamed captain Applegate; Barkley; Hollis; Lespere; Smith; Stimson; Stone; Turner; Underwood; Woode; Unnamed crewman	"Kaleidoscope" (1949), short story	Rocket Company	Future
Unnamed captain Applegate; Barkley; Hollis; Lespere; Smith; Stimson; Stone; Turner; Underwood; Woode; Unnamed crewman	Crew hurled apart into space when rocket explodes.		
Moon Base: Unnamed Commodore (Commanding Officer); Towers, Col. (Executive Officer); Morgan, Maj. (Senior Bomb Officer); John Ezra Dahlquist, Lt. (Ph.D.) (Junior Bomb Officer); Kelly; Smitty (Marine) (Lockmaster); Lopez (Guard); Unnamed personnel	"The Long Watch" (a.k.a. "Rebellion on the Moon") (1949), short story	The Patrol: Moon Base United Nations?: Trygve Lie; Lafayette	June 1999
Moon Base: Unnamed Commodore (Commanding Officer); Towers, Col. (Executive Officer); Morgan, Maj. (Senior Bomb Officer); John Ezra Dahlquist, Lt. (Ph.D.) (Junior Bomb Officer); Kelly; Smitty (Marine) (Lockmaster); Lopez (Guard); Unnamed personnel	Dahlquist sacrifices himself to prevent world coup d'état by Towers. Part of Heinlein's "Future History" series.		
Mel Robbins, Col.	"Operation Pumice" (1949), short story	Moon Rocket One (MR-1)	1959
Mel Robbins, Col.	Pilot of first crewed circumlunar mission aboard five-stage rocket launched from New Mexico.		
David Mannen	"Over the Top" (1949), short story	United Technical Foundation (Unitech)	Near Future (April or May) (Note: Israel Independence Day takes place during the story.)
David Mannen	Three-foot-tall little person is first human on Mars.		
Daniel MacGregor Dare, Col. Albert Fitzwilliam Digby	Dan Dare, Pilot of the Future (1950–1967), comic	Anastasia	1996+
Daniel MacGregor Dare, Col. Albert Fitzwilliam Digby	Astronaut in Earth's Interplanetary Spacefleet; travelled to Venus, Mercury, Saturn.		
Jim Barnes (Pilot); Charles "Doc" Cargraves, Dr. (Propulsion Expert); Thayer, Gen. (Co-Pilot); Joe Sweeney (Radio Operator)	Destination Moon (a.k.a. Journey to the Moon, Operation Moon) (1950), film	Luna	Near Future (June)
Jim Barnes (Pilot); Charles "Doc" Cargraves, Dr. (Propulsion Expert); Thayer, Gen. (Co-Pilot); Joe Sweeney (Radio Operator)	Astronauts on a nuclear rocket to the Moon. Landing in crater Harpalus.		
Lewis Thorson (Captain) "Smitty" Smithson, Dr. (Physician/Morale Officer); Hollison, Lt. Sparks (Communications); Carpenter; Robinson; Haley; Richardson (Gunnery); Unnamed crew members	Dimension X No Contact (1950), radio play	Starcloud	June 2, 1987 (Note: Opening narration says Starcloud launches on June 2, 1987, but a later log entry by Thorson is dated June 2, 1987 and says Starcloud is "four weeks out from Earth".)
Lewis Thorson (Captain) "Smitty" Smithson, Dr. (Physician/Morale Officer); Hollison, Lt. Sparks (Communications); Carpenter; Robinson; Haley; Richardson (Gunnery); Unnamed crew members	Sixth crew attempting to breach "Great Galactic Barrier" and reach planet Volta. Commander Collier, a navigation officer, and men named Prentiss and Margitson were lost on previous missions.		
Cornelius Otterbyrne, Prof. (Atomic physicist); Paul Aarons, Dr. (Astromathematician); Robert Simons (Electronic engineer); Carl Parker (Mining specialist); Watson; Gibbs; Henry Timkin (Federal Bureau of Missing Persons); Jefferson Philo (Science journalist)	Dimension X The Man in the Moon (1950), radio play	Unknown	1950
Cornelius Otterbyrne, Prof. (Atomic physicist); Paul Aarons, Dr. (Astromathematician); Robert Simons (Electronic engineer); Carl Parker (Mining specialist); Watson; Gibbs; Henry Timkin (Federal Bureau of Missing Persons); Jefferson Philo (Science journalist)	"Federal Bureau of Missing Persons" receives radio message from the Moon, leading to discovery of moonbase built in 1938 by "renegade scientists and criminals" on lunar farside. Otterbyrne and others were kidnapped as slave labor for colony.		
R-46: Raymond F. Carmody, Capt. (U.S.S.F.) Russia: Anna Borisovna Carmody	"Honeymoon in Hell" (1950), short story	United States Space Service: R-46 rocket Russia: Unnamed rocket	September 16, 1962 – February 1963
R-46: Raymond F. Carmody, Capt. (U.S.S.F.) Russia: Anna Borisovna Carmody	American and Russian pilots marry and travel to Moon in attempt to escape unknown effect preventing conception of male humans on Earth. Landings in Hell crater. Carmody previously landed R-24 rocket on the Moon, one of eighteen American pilots to attempt the round trip and only five to return alive. Adapted into 1956 X Minus One episode.		
Power satellite: Unnamed personnel Charon: Unnamed pilot Leslie LeCroix, Capt. (Relief pilot) Pioneer: Les LeCroix, Capt. Mayflower: Les LeCroix, Capt. (Pilot); Bob Coster (Engineer); Janet (Scientist) (no last name given); Three unnamed scientists	The Man Who Sold the Moon (1950), novella	Power satellite Charon (shuttle rocket) Harriman and Strong: Pioneer; Mayflower; Colonial	c. 1978
Power satellite: Unnamed personnel Charon: Unnamed pilot Leslie LeCroix, Capt. (Relief pilot) Pioneer: Les LeCroix, Capt. Mayflower: Les LeCroix, Capt. (Pilot); Bob Coster (Engineer); Janet (Scientist) (no last name given); Three unnamed scientists	Commercially funded initial Moon expeditions. LeCroix makes first Moon landing in Pioneer west of Archimedes; Mayflower establishes first Moon colony. Part of Heinlein's "Future History" series.		
Floyd Graham, Col. (Pilot); Harry Chamberlain (Navigator/Astronomer); William Corrigan, Maj. (Engineer); Karl Eckstrom, Dr. Lisa Van Horn, Dr. (Chemist)	Rocketship X-M (1950), film	X-M ("eXpedition Moon")	Near Future
Floyd Graham, Col. (Pilot); Harry Chamberlain (Navigator/Astronomer); William Corrigan, Maj. (Engineer); Karl Eckstrom, Dr. Lisa Van Horn, Dr. (Chemist)	Astronauts on a Moon rocket that "accidentally" lands on Mars.		
Robert Maynard	"Unwelcome Tenant" (1950), short story	Unknown (Scientific foundation)	Future
Robert Maynard	First man to travel to Mars realizes that all humans on Earth are the hosts of parasitic intelligences.		
Jim Barker, Dr. (Commander/Engineer); Steve Abbott (Journalist); William Jackson, Prof. (Scientist); Lane, Dr. (Physicist); Carol Stafford (Physicist)	Flight to Mars (1951), film	The Pentagon: Rocketship M.A.R.S.	c. 2001
Jim Barker, Dr. (Commander/Engineer); Steve Abbott (Journalist); William Jackson, Prof. (Scientist); Lane, Dr. (Physicist); Carol Stafford (Physicist)	First crewed Mars mission encounters dying Martian civilization.		
Crandall (Captain); Killian (Executive Officer); Wilbur; Lavinia Pickerell (Note: First name given in later books.) Haggerty (Navigator)	Miss Pickerell Goes to Mars (1951), novel	Unknown	Contemporary/Near Future
Crandall (Captain); Killian (Executive Officer); Wilbur; Lavinia Pickerell Haggerty (Navigator)	Secret expedition to Mars. Haggerty is accidentally left behind on Earth due to Miss Pickerell unexpectedly boarding rocket.		
Roger Wilson, Capt. (US) Garner Lunar Expedition: James Harwood Garner, Dr. (Leader/Engineer/Astrophysicist); Thomas Ridgely Duncan, Ph.D. (Physicist/Second-in-command); Eustace M. Hughey, Dr. (Surgeon); Robert Kenneth Moore, Dr. (Chemist); Warren P. Tolman, Dr. (Chemist); Arthur W. Kendall (Photographer); David H. King (Mineralogist); Hampden S. Reed (Mineralogist); Anthony T. Melville (Astrophysicist); Carl Jewell Long (Astronomer/Navigator); George W. Rice (Electrician/Mechanic); Joseph T. Whisler (Cook/Mechanic); Frederick L. Bender (Mechanic); Morrison; Wilcott (no first names given for last two) Relief ship: Two unnamed pilots	The Moon Is Hell (1951), novelette	United States; Garner Lunar Expedition: Rocket; Fort Washington (moonbase); Relief ship	June 15, 1979 – 1981
Garner Lunar Expedition spends 23 months near the center of the far side of the Moon before becoming stranded when their relief ship crashes on arrival. In 1974, Wilson orbited the Moon twice and landed on the near side for two days. Garner Expedition launches from Inyokern, California, on June 10, 1979; relief ship launches from Mojave, California, around May 10, 1981.
Henderson (no first name given)	"Old Man Henderson" (1951, revised 1970), short story	Unknown	Future (21st century?)
Henderson (no first name given)	Now an old man, Henderson reminisces about being the first man on the Moon.		
Lewis Taine (US); Pierre Leduc (France); James Richards (UK); Victor Hassell (UK); Arnold Clinton (Australia)	Prelude to Space (a.k.a. Master of Space, The Space Dreamers) (1951), novel	Prometheus Alpha/Beta	1978
Lewis Taine (US); Pierre Leduc (France); James Richards (UK); Victor Hassell (UK); Arnold Clinton (Australia)	Candidates for the first crewed mission to the Moon.		
First group: Joel "Chap" Chapman (Pilot/Mechanic); Dixon; Driesbach; Unnamed group members Second group: Bening (Astronomer); Joel "Chap" Chapman; Robert Dahl (Mathematician); Dick Donley (Geologist); Dowden (Astronomer); Julius Klein (Botanist) Third group: Joel "Chap" Chapman; Williams; Unnamed group members Eberlein (Relief ship captain)	"The Reluctant Heroes" (1951), short story	The Commission: Research bunker Relief ship	Future
First group: Joel "Chap" Chapman (Pilot/Mechanic); Dixon; Driesbach; Unnamed group members Second group: Bening (Astronomer); Joel "Chap" Chapman; Robert Dahl (Mathematician); Dick Donley (Geologist); Dowden (Astronomer); Julius Klein (Botanist) Third group: Joel "Chap" Chapman; Williams; Unnamed group members Eberlein (Relief ship captain)	Members of research groups at outpost on Moon (possibly in Tycho).		
Unnamed rocket pilot	"The Rocket Man" (1951), short story	Unknown	Early 21st century (August)
Unnamed rocket pilot	Pilot visits his wife and 14-year-old son between trips to space.		
Wayne Crowder	"Vital Factor" (1951), short story Tales of Tomorrow; Test Flight (1951), TV	Wayne Crowder Enterprises	Near Future
Wayne Crowder	Spacecraft on privately financed test flight is redirected to Mars.		
Crenshaw; Reese Bitner	"The Brain-Bats of Venus" (1952), comic	N/A	Future
Crenshaw; Reese Bitner	Crew of spacecraft that crashes on Venus; Bitner dies on impact and is taken over by a Venusian creature called a Brain-Bat.		
Robert Jaffe (Captain); John Crawford, Dr. (Ship's Doctor); Jensen (Chief Hospitalman) (no first name given); Scotty McIntire (Navigation); Donald Shaver (Navigation); Roger Wescott (Navigation) "Boats" (Boatswain); Unnamed ship's barber 73 unnamed crewmembers	"Counterfeit" (aka "The Counterfeit Man") (1952), novelet	Exploratory Command	Future
Robert Jaffe (Captain); John Crawford, Dr. (Ship's Doctor); Jensen (Chief Hospitalman) (no first name given); Scotty McIntire (Navigation); Donald Shaver (Navigation); Roger Wescott (Navigation) "Boats" (Boatswain); Unnamed ship's barber 73 unnamed crewmembers	Crew of exploratory vessel returning to Los Alamos Spaceport from Venus (Ganymede in later editions) with shapeshifting alien imposter aboard. Adapted into 1965 Out of the Unknown episode.		
Denby (no first name given)	"The Dreamer" (1952), short story	N/A	Near Future
Denby (no first name given)	Trainee astronaut Denby discovers that space travel is not what he had expected.		
Space station officers: Benson; Baker; Colin Ord Lioness: Marilyn Lynn, Dr. (Physician); Fifty unnamed crewmembers	"Hallucination Orbit" (aka "The Bliss of Solitude") (1952), short story	Station Two Four Star Lines: Lioness (relief ship)	Future
Space station officers: Benson; Baker; Colin Ord Lioness: Marilyn Lynn, Dr. (Physician); Fifty unnamed crewmembers	Lone officers manning space station in Pluto's orbit are afflicted by "solitosis". Adapted into 1956 X Minus One episode.		
Mercury expedition: R. Doyle; Borrell (Navigator); Glynne (Radio Operator) (no first names given); Unnamed crewmembers Inner Station: R. Doyle, Cmdr. (Training); Apprentices: Tim Benton (Senior apprentice); Ronnie Jordan; Norman Powell; Karl Hasse; Peter van Holberg; Five unnamed apprentices Unnamed crewmembers Space Hospital: Hawkins, Dr. (no first name given) (Biologist); Unnamed scientist Unnamed crewmembers Sirius: Jones, Capt. (Pilot) (no first name given) Inter-orbit ferry: Unnamed pilots	Islands in the Sky (1952), novel	Mercury expedition Space stations: Inner Station (Space Station One/Residential Station); Space Hospital; Relay Station Two Spacecraft: Sirius; Morning Star; The Skylark of Space (ferry); Inter-orbit ferry Earth ferry (spaceplane)	Late 21st century
Mercury expedition: R. Doyle; Borrell (Navigator); Glynne (Radio Operator) (no first names given); Unnamed crewmembers Inner Station: R. Doyle, Cmdr. (Training); Apprentices: Tim Benton (Senior apprentice); Ronnie Jordan; Norman Powell; Karl Hasse; Peter van Holberg; Five unnamed apprentices Unnamed crewmembers Space Hospital: Hawkins, Dr. (no first name given) (Biologist); Unnamed scientist Unnamed crewmembers Sirius: Jones, Capt. (Pilot) (no first name given) Inter-orbit ferry: Unnamed pilots	16-year-old Roy Malcolm wins trip to Inner Station on television quiz. Doyle took part in first expedition to Mercury years earlier; Morning Star made first circumnavigation of Venus in 1985.		
Jeff Foldingchair Eros: Miles Vance, Capt. Nat Rothman (Pilot/Geologist); Richard Steele (Engineer); Paul Sokolsky, Dr. (Physician/Biologist); Lewis "Lew" Wong (Radar Operator); Ginger Parsons (Cook/Photographer); Charles Svensen	Marooned on Mars (1952), novel	United States / Space Commission (under United Nations charter): Eros	Future
Jeff Foldingchair Eros: Miles Vance, Capt. Nat Rothman (Pilot/Geologist); Richard Steele (Engineer); Paul Sokolsky, Dr. (Physician/Biologist); Lewis "Lew" Wong (Radar Operator); Ginger Parsons (Cook/Photographer); Charles Svensen	First crewed Mars mission, launched from Moon base. 18-year-old Svensen stows away after being replaced on crew by Wong due to his age. Foldingchair is a long-time rocket pilot who stowed away on the second crewed Moon mission 25 years earlier.		
Connors (Captain); Barton (Tube chief); Griffith; Purdy; Withington (Fuel man) (no first names given)	"The Missing Symbol" (1952), short story	Rachel II	Future
Connors (Captain); Barton (Tube chief); Griffith; Purdy; Withington (Fuel man) (no first names given)	Members of first crewed Moon mission are affected by space madness.		
Burney, Dr. (Commander); Emil Wohl (Head geologist/Second-in-command) "M.D." McLeod (Physician); Sherman, Dr. (Chief astronomer); Louise Hansen (Astronomer); Bucky O'Neil (Rocket pilot); Johnny Pierce (Map section); Mike Ramirez (Radio operator); Joey Friedman (Radio operator); Jean (Nurse) (no last name given); Edna (no last name given); 36 unnamed personnel Tractor Two: Paul E. Hansen (Spare photographer/Tractor driver); Fernandez (Geologist); Groswald (Mechanic); Van Ness (Astronomer)	Moonwalk (1952), novelette	Moonbase; Tractor One; Tractor Two; Rocket	Future
Burney, Dr. (Commander); Emil Wohl (Head geologist/Second-in-command) "M.D." McLeod (Physician); Sherman, Dr. (Chief astronomer); Louise Hansen (Astronomer); Bucky O'Neil (Rocket pilot); Johnny Pierce (Map section); Mike Ramirez (Radio operator); Joey Friedman (Radio operator); Jean (Nurse) (no last name given); Edna (no last name given); 36 unnamed personnel Tractor Two: Paul E. Hansen (Spare photographer/Tractor driver); Fernandez (Geologist); Groswald (Mechanic); Van Ness (Astronomer)	On excursion from first major moonbase (in Archimedes crater), Tractor Two plummets over ringwall of crater Plato, leaving Hansen to find his way back to base alone.		
ZQX-1: Frederick Stone, Capt. Halley: Fred Stone, Col. Einstein: Fred Stone, Col. (Commander); Bill Parks	Space Cat (1952), Space Cat Visits Venus (1955), Space Cat Meets Mars (1957), Space Cat and the Kittens (1958), chapter books	United States Air Force: ZQX-1 (Note: Incorrectly named "ZOX-1" in Space Cat Meets Mars (p. 3).); Halley; Einstein	Near Future
ZQX-1: Frederick Stone, Capt. Halley: Fred Stone, Col. Einstein: Fred Stone, Col. (Commander); Bill Parks	Cat named Flyball accompanies Stone on suborbital flight and first crewed Moon flight in ZQX-1, journey to Venus and Mars in Halley, and flight to Alpha Centauri aboard hyperdrive-powered Einstein.		
Robert Malcolm (Captain); Bart (Scientist); Jack	Tales of Tomorrow; Appointment on Mars (1952), TV	Standard Motors (sponsor)	Future
Robert Malcolm (Captain); Bart (Scientist); Jack	Three men on first expedition to Mars turn on each other.		
Paula Martin Bennett	Tales of Tomorrow; Flight Overdue (1952), TV	Unknown	Near Future
Paula Martin Bennett	Ambitious aviatrix joins Moon mission.		
Allen Rice, Maj.	"Thanasphere" (1952), short story	United States Air Force; Project Cyclops	Contemporary
Allen Rice, Maj.	First man in outer space discovers that it is inhabited by ghosts.		
Rayen, Gen. (Commanding Officer); Nichols, Col. (Commanding Officer); Wall, Capt. Weiler, Maj. Unnamed personnel Rocket Four (Squad Fourteen): Breck Jergen, Sgt./M.P. (Squad leader); Jim Clymer; Frank Haddon, Sgt. Lassen (no first name given); Walter Millis; Joe Valinez; Unnamed personnel	"What's It Like Out There?" (1952), novelet	United Nations; Expedition Two: Rockets One – Twenty	1960s (June)
Rayen, Gen. (Commanding Officer); Nichols, Col. (Commanding Officer); Wall, Capt. Weiler, Maj. Unnamed personnel Rocket Four (Squad Fourteen): Breck Jergen, Sgt./M.P. (Squad leader); Jim Clymer; Frank Haddon, Sgt. Lassen (no first name given); Walter Millis; Joe Valinez; Unnamed personnel	On his return to Earth, Haddon finds himself unable to tell people of the true horrors of Mars expedition.		
Hal Barlow (D-716)	"By Earthlight" (1953), short story	The Brotherhood	Near Future
Hal Barlow (D-716)	Member of secret society placed aboard uncrewed US moon rocket to delay atomic war. Landing in Albategnius.		
Laird Grainger (Commander); Kip Reissner, Lt. (USN) (Co-Pilot); Helen Salinger (Navigator); Douglas Smith (Radio Operator); Walter Walters (Engineer)	Cat-Women of the Moon (a.k.a. Rocket to the Moon) (1953), film	Atomic Rocket Group 4: Moon Rocket 4 (Note: The numeral "63" appears on the rocket in exterior shots.)	Near Future
Laird Grainger (Commander); Kip Reissner, Lt. (USN) (Co-Pilot); Helen Salinger (Navigator); Douglas Smith (Radio Operator); Walter Walters (Engineer)	First crewed Moon mission encounters female lunar inhabitants.		
Brown; Cellini DFC-3: Garrard (no first names given)	"Common Time" (1953), short story	The Project: DFC-3 (starship)	Future
Brown; Cellini DFC-3: Garrard (no first names given)	After first two pilots to attempt to reach Alpha Centauri system fail to return, Garrard experiences severe time variations and a mysterious alien encounter on the third attempt.		
Andrew "Jet" Morgan, Captain; Lemuel Barnet; Stephen Mitchell "Doc" Matthews	Journey into Space (1953–5), radio	Operation Luna	1965+
Andrew "Jet" Morgan, Captain; Lemuel Barnet; Stephen Mitchell "Doc" Matthews	British Commonwealth astronauts on a trip to the Moon and beyond.		
Martin Dearborn, Capt. George Beebe; Unnamed colonists	Missing Men of Saturn (1953), novel	Unknown	Future
Martin Dearborn, Capt. George Beebe; Unnamed colonists	Dearborn and his colonists, the first humans to reach the Saturn system, are captured on Titan by Saturnians, resulting in their descendants spending the next hundred years on Saturn.		
Robert Cox	"Nightmare Brother" (1953), short story	Unknown	Future
Robert Cox	After the first starships return to Earth with their crews driven mad by their experiences, Cox undergoes rigorous training to follow them.		
Greene, Gen. Magellan: "Bright Eyes" Briteis, Col. (Commander); Bill Moore, Maj. (Note: Promoted to Brigadier General at the end of the film.); Wernher, Dr. (imposter)	Project Moonbase (1953), film	United States Space Force Command (USSF SPACOM); Space station Project Moon Base: Magellan (renamed Moon Base #1)	1970
Greene, Gen. Magellan: "Bright Eyes" Briteis, Col. (Commander); Bill Moore, Maj. Wernher, Dr. (imposter)	First lunar orbital mission turns into Moon landing when Wernher is unmasked as an impostor. The female Col. Briteis was the first human in Earth orbit in 1966.		
Ludwig Rechenheim, Dr. Charles Greene; Victor Carroon	The Quatermass Experiment (1953), TV	Experimental Rocket	Unknown
Ludwig Rechenheim, Dr. Charles Greene; Victor Carroon	Astronauts of the British Experimental Rocket Group. Members of the first crewed space mission; only Victor Carroon survives the flight.		
Rocket ship: Jason; McCloud Space Platform: Unnamed garrison members	Robot Monster (a.k.a. Monster from Mars, Monsters from the Moon) (1953), film	Rocket ship Space Platform	Contemporary
Rocket ship: Jason; McCloud Space Platform: Unnamed garrison members	Alien invader Ro-Man destroys space platform and rocket carrying Jason and McCloud, two of the last eight humans on Earth. The story turns out to be a little boy's dream.		
Space Station: Pepper, Gen. (USAF) (Commanding Officer) (no first name given); Unnamed space taxi pilot Unnamed personnel Moon rocket: George Merola, Capt. (USAF) (Pilot/Navigator); Dan Forbes, 1st Lt. (USAF) (Engineer); Fred Gehardt, Dr. (Geologist); Peter Phelps, M.D. (Physician); Ted Baker	Rocket to Luna (1953), novel	United States Air Force	September 1983
Space Station: Pepper, Gen. (USAF) (Commanding Officer) (no first name given); Unnamed space taxi pilot Unnamed personnel Moon rocket: George Merola, Capt. (USAF) (Pilot/Navigator); Dan Forbes, 1st Lt. (USAF) (Engineer); Fred Gehardt, Dr. (Geologist); Peter Phelps, M.D. (Physician); Ted Baker	17-year-old Space Academy cadet Baker, an accidental addition to the crew, crashes first crewed Moon rocket in Mare Crisium, forcing him and Forbes to make 1000-mile trek to supply dump in Mare Imbrium near Archimedes.		
Pelican One: Joe Kenmore (Skipper); Chief Bender (Engine room); Thomas Haney (Bos'n); Mike Scandia Space Platform: Sanford (Senior scientist/Commander); Brent (Crew psychologist); Corey (Crewman); Brown, Lt. Cmdr. (USN) (Replacement commander) Moonship: Brown, Lt. Cmdr. (USN) (Commander); Unnamed crewmembers	Space Tug (1953), novel	United States; Space Exploration Project: Space Platform (space station); Pelican One (supply ship); Unnamed supply ship Moonship	Near Future
Pelican One: Joe Kenmore (Skipper); Chief Bender (Engine room); Thomas Haney (Bos'n); Mike Scandia Space Platform: Sanford (Senior scientist/Commander); Brent (Crew psychologist); Corey (Crewman); Brown, Lt. Cmdr. (USN) (Replacement commander) Moonship: Brown, Lt. Cmdr. (USN) (Commander); Unnamed crewmembers	Pelican One flies first resupply mission to American space station armed with atomic missiles and assists Moonship in making first crewed Moon landing.		
Stephen Mitchell, Dr. (Engineer); Lisa Frank, Dr. (Mathematician)	Spaceways (1953), film	AS-2	Near Future
Stephen Mitchell, Dr. (Engineer); Lisa Frank, Dr. (Mathematician)	American rocket scientist Mitchell, an adviser to British space program, makes first crewed spaceflight to prove himself innocent of murder.		
Jock Kruger	"Dead Center" (1954), novelet	United States: KIM-VII	Near Future
Jock Kruger	Veteran of two circumlunar lights is first human to land on the Moon, but becomes stranded five degrees of arc onto the lunar farside.		
Hugh Allenby (Commander/Astronomer); Burton (Pilot); Janus (Photographer); Gonzales (Botanist); Randolph (Biologist); Peters (Mineralogist)	"The Holes Around Mars" (1954), short story	Mars I	Unknown
Hugh Allenby (Commander/Astronomer); Burton (Pilot); Janus (Photographer); Gonzales (Botanist); Randolph (Biologist); Peters (Mineralogist)	Crew of the first crewed expedition to Mars. They discover that the planet is orbited at very low altitude by a micro black hole.		
Rocket 1: Richard Donald Stanton, Dr. (USN) Rocket 2: Jerome "Jerry" Lockwood, Dr. (Prof.) Rocket 3: Walter J. Gordon	Riders to the Stars (1954), film	United States; Office of Scientific Investigation (OSI): Rocket 1 Rocket 2 Rocket 3	Near Future (July – August 10)
Rocket 1: Richard Donald Stanton, Dr. (USN) Rocket 2: Jerome "Jerry" Lockwood, Dr. (Prof.) Rocket 3: Walter J. Gordon	Astronauts make suborbital flights to capture meteors.		
Reverdy L. "Rev" McMillen, III, 1st Lt. (USAF) Rescue ship: Frank Pickrell, Capt. Four unnamed crewmembers	"The Cave of Night" (1955), short story	Unknown (US)	Near Future
Reverdy L. "Rev" McMillen, III, 1st Lt. (USAF) Rescue ship: Frank Pickrell, Capt. Four unnamed crewmembers	Efforts to rescue McMillen from orbit inspire humanity to explore space. Pickrell later commands orbital platform Doughnut. Adapted into 1956 X Minus One episode.		
Samuel T. Merritt, Col./Gen. Barney Merritt, Capt. André Fodor, Sgt. Imoto, Sgt. (Japan); Mahoney, Sgt. Jackie Siegle, Sgt.	Conquest of Space (1955), film	Unknown	Near Future (late 20th century)
Samuel T. Merritt, Col./Gen. Barney Merritt, Capt. André Fodor, Sgt. Imoto, Sgt. (Japan); Mahoney, Sgt. Jackie Siegle, Sgt.	Astronauts on a mission to Mars.		
1 (Captain); 2 (Navigator); 3 (Astrophysicist); 4 (Meteorologist); 5; 6 (no names given)	Disneyland; Man in Space (1955), TV	Operation Space Flight: XR-1 (spaceplane)	Near Future
1 (Captain); 2 (Navigator); 3 (Astrophysicist); 4 (Meteorologist); 5; 6 (no names given)	Members of first crewed spaceflight. Crewmember #6 conducts spacewalk.		
RM-1: Unnamed captain Frank (Navigator); Bill (Radio Operator); Joe (Engineer) (no last names given)	Disneyland; Man and the Moon (a.k.a. Tomorrow the Moon) (1955), TV	Space Station Number One (S-1); RM-1 (Moonship)	Near Future
RM-1: Unnamed captain Frank (Navigator); Bill (Radio Operator); Joe (Engineer) (no last names given)	Members of first crewed voyage around the Moon.		
Richard Gordon, Dr. (Zoogeographer); Nora Pierce, Dr. (Mineralogist); Ralph Martin, Dr. (Physician); Patricia Bennett, Dr. (Chemist) (Note: Westfahl (p. 185) and the AFI Catalog assign the wrong scientific specialties to the characters.)	King Dinosaur (1955), film	United States	Near Future (from April 23)
Richard Gordon, Dr. (Zoogeographer); Nora Pierce, Dr. (Mineralogist); Ralph Martin, Dr. (Physician); Patricia Bennett, Dr. (Chemist)	Travelers to planet Nova, which recently entered Earth's solar system. Launch on October 2.		
SV-1: Grinnell (no first name given); Hal Gascoigne, Col. Civilian Intelligence Group (CIG): Peter Harris	"King of the Hill" (1955), short story	United States Air Force: Satellite Vehicle 1 (SV-1) Ferry rocket	Near Future
SV-1: Grinnell (no first name given); Hal Gascoigne, Col. Civilian Intelligence Group (CIG): Peter Harris	Left too long without being relieved aboard one-man satellite armed with three hydrogen bombs, Gascoigne hallucinates that he has received orders to bomb Washington, D.C.		
Tim Rocket ship: Frank; Doc (Physician); Roger; Fred Moonbeam III: Frank; Doc (Physician); Roger; Fred; Bill; Unnamed crewmembers Moonbeam IV: Rusty; Unnamed crewmembers The Cow: Tom (Captain); Four unnamed crewmembers Moon Ship I: Roger; Unnamed crewmembers Moon Ship II: Frank; Unnamed crewmembers Moon Ship III: Tom (Captain); Doc (Physician) (no last names given); Unnamed crewmembers (Bill and Fred also on expedition)	Peter and the Rocket Ship (1955), Peter and the Two-Hour Moon (1956), Peter and the Moon Trip (1957), chapter books	United States Army: Unnamed rocket ship Moonbeam III (rocket); Moonbeam IV (rocket); Two-Hour Moon (Space Station) The Cow; Moon Ship I Moon Ship II; Moon Ship III	Near Future
Tim Rocket ship: Frank; Doc (Physician); Roger; Fred Moonbeam III: Frank; Doc (Physician); Roger; Fred; Bill; Unnamed crewmembers Moonbeam IV: Rusty; Unnamed crewmembers The Cow: Tom (Captain); Four unnamed crewmembers Moon Ship I: Roger; Unnamed crewmembers Moon Ship II: Frank; Unnamed crewmembers Moon Ship III: Tom (Captain); Doc (Physician) (no last names given); Unnamed crewmembers (Bill and Fred also on expedition)	Young Peter Sills accompanies crews of first crewed spaceflight, Moonbeam III mission to build humanity's first space station, and first crewed lunar landing. The Cow flies around Moon; Moon Ships I, II and III land in Bay of Rainbows near Sea of Rains, where crews build moon base.		
Bernard Quatermass, Prof. Leo Pugh, Dr.	Quatermass II (1955), TV	Experimental Rocket	Near Future
Bernard Quatermass, Prof. Leo Pugh, Dr.	Scientists of the British Experimental Rocket Group go into space in an attempt to use a faulty nuclear rocket to blow up an alien asteroid/spacecraft directing a covert invasion of Earth.		
Valier: Carl Logan, Maj. (Pilot); Johnny Ruiz, Capt. (Co-Pilot); Edward "Mac" MacNamara, Maj. (USAF) (Flight Engineer)	"Tight Squeeze" (1955), short story	Operation Doughnut (US) Valier; Wyld; Space Station	Near Future
Valier: Carl Logan, Maj. (Pilot); Johnny Ruiz, Capt. (Co-Pilot); Edward "Mac" MacNamara, Maj. (USAF) (Flight Engineer)	Astronauts on a space station resupply mission who find themselves dealing with mechanical issues after reaching orbit.		
Cadets: Cohen "the Wire-haired Terror"; Beerbelly Flacker "Mickey Mouse" Gindes; Harris; Kraków; Pete; Shank "Walky" Walkinok "Bendover" Wendover Long Haul: Scampy (Cadet) (nickname; no real name given)	"Who?" (a.k.a. "Bulkhead") (1955), novelette	Space Service	Future (post-20th century)
Cadets: Cohen "the Wire-haired Terror"; Beerbelly Flacker "Mickey Mouse" Gindes; Harris; Kraków; Pete; Shank "Walky" Walkinok "Bendover" Wendover Long Haul: Scampy (Cadet) (nickname; no real name given)	Cadet training for starship command whose crewmate on round-trip training voyage is a 15-year-old boy.		
"Ridge" Ridging (Geophysicist) "Shan" Shandara (Cartographer); Tazewell (No first names given); Unnamed crewmembers	"Dust Rag" (1956), short story	The Project: Albireo	Future (20th century)
"Ridge" Ridging (Geophysicist) "Shan" Shandara (Cartographer); Tazewell (No first names given); Unnamed crewmembers	On first Moon expedition, Ridging and Shandara are endangered by dust in Plato crater.		
Two-man teams: Tilton; Beck Booker; Whitman Don (Note: Also referred to as "Walt" (pp. 131–132).) Fowler; Al "Mac" MacIntosh Unnamed astronauts Moon rocket/Shuttle: Unnamed pilots	"The Far Look" (1956), novelette	United States: Moon Station; Moon rocket Space Station Number One; Shuttle	Future
Two-man teams: Tilton; Beck Booker; Whitman Don Fowler; Al "Mac" MacIntosh Unnamed astronauts Moon rocket/Shuttle: Unnamed pilots	Two-man teams return to Earth from twenty-eight-day stays in mobile dome on Mare Imbrium transformed into superior human beings. Tilton and Beck were second team on Moon.		
Luther Blair (US) (Nuclear scientist/Expedition leader); Larson, Capt. Anderson (Communications specialist); Doc Higgins (UK) (Scientist); Sydney Stanhope (Geologist)	Fire Maidens from Outer Space (a.k.a. Fire Maidens of Outer Space, Fire Maidens of Space) (1956), film	Expedition 13 (US/UK)	Future
Luther Blair (US) (Nuclear scientist/Expedition leader); Larson, Capt. Anderson (Communications specialist); Doc Higgins (UK) (Scientist); Sydney Stanhope (Geologist)	Mission to the thirteenth moon of Jupiter discovers survivors of Atlantean civilization.		
Lewis Rohnen (Albert Rohnen Foundation) (Expedition Leader); Thomas Russell, Col./Gen. (USAF) (Operational Officer); Bruner, Dr. (No first name given) (Atomic scientist); Franklin Lormer, Maj. (Engineer); Jan Kephart, 1st Lt. (Jet Expert); Maximillian "Mac" Hartman, Lt. (US Army) (Communications Officer)	Night of the Auk (1956), play	First Moon Expedition: Rocket One	Near Future ("The day after some tomorrow")
Lewis Rohnen (Albert Rohnen Foundation) (Expedition Leader); Thomas Russell, Col./Gen. (USAF) (Operational Officer); Bruner, Dr. (No first name given) (Atomic scientist); Franklin Lormer, Maj. (Engineer); Jan Kephart, 1st Lt. (Jet Expert); Maximillian "Mac" Hartman, Lt. (US Army) (Communications Officer)	First crewed Moon landing triggers nuclear war on Earth.		
M 76: Stephen Maxwell, Prof. (Commander/Navigator); Petifer (Pilot); Bertram Hapton; Gordon Holder (Fuel Consumption Engineer); Unnamed crewmember US spacecraft: Stilwell, Gen. Vanburg, Capt. Boles, Lt. John DeLut (Biologist); Jaeger (Mathematician); Unnamed crewmembers	No Man Friday (a.k.a. First on Mars) (1956), novel	M 76 (UK) Unnamed spacecraft (United States Air Force)	c. 1957 – 1972
M 76: Stephen Maxwell, Prof. (Commander/Navigator); Petifer (Pilot); Bertram Hapton; Gordon Holder (Fuel Consumption Engineer); Unnamed crewmember US spacecraft: Stilwell, Gen. Vanburg, Capt. Boles, Lt. John DeLut (Biologist); Jaeger (Mathematician); Unnamed crewmembers	Holder is stranded on Mars after his crewmates die in decompression accident. American spacecraft lands at latitude −35.		
Robin Carew	One Against the Moon (1956), novel	United States Air Force	c. 1958
Robin Carew	Carew accidentally stows away aboard uncrewed atomic rocket launched to Moon from New Mexico.		
Michael Haydon, Cmdr. "Lefty" Blake; Merrity, Prof. (Scientist); Larry Noble; Kim Hamilton (Reporter/Stowaway)	Satellite in the Sky (1956), film	Project Stardust (UK); Stardust (spaceplane)	Near Future
Michael Haydon, Cmdr. "Lefty" Blake; Merrity, Prof. (Scientist); Larry Noble; Kim Hamilton (Reporter/Stowaway)	Spaceplane carries atomic bomb into orbit.		
Cologne: Ralph C. Pigeon, Cmdr. Acuff, Lt. Unnamed astronauts Titan Expedition: Crawford, Cdre. Stranger Station: Paul Wesson, Sgt.	"Stranger Station" (1956), short story	Cologne Titan Expedition Stranger Station	July 1, 1987 1997 c. 2087
Cologne: Ralph C. Pigeon, Cmdr. Acuff, Lt. Unnamed astronauts Titan Expedition: Crawford, Cdre. Stranger Station: Paul Wesson, Sgt.	A century after Pigeon's emergency landing on Titan leads to first contact with non-humanoid alien race, Wesson is sent to Stranger Station in high Earth orbit for a visit by one of the aliens.		
Endeavour: Unnamed (Commander); Trevor Williams, Prof. (Astronomer); Henderson (Geophysicist); Dave Bolton (Navigator); Unnamed crewmembers Goddard: "Van" Vandenburg, Capt. (Commander); Paynter, Dr (Geophysicist); Anderson, Dr (Astronomer); Unnamed crewmembers Ziolkovski: Krasnin (Commander); Vladimir Surov (Botanist); Unnamed crewmembers	Venture to the Moon (1956), series of short stories	Endeavour (UK); Goddard (USA); Ziolkovski (USSR)	Near Future (after 1972)
Endeavour: Unnamed (Commander); Trevor Williams, Prof. (Astronomer); Henderson (Geophysicist); Dave Bolton (Navigator); Unnamed crewmembers Goddard: "Van" Vandenburg, Capt. (Commander); Paynter, Dr (Geophysicist); Anderson, Dr (Astronomer); Unnamed crewmembers Ziolkovski: Krasnin (Commander); Vladimir Surov (Botanist); Unnamed crewmembers	First crewed expedition to the Moon, joint UK/US/Russian project; landing in Mare Imbrium. Richards and Shannon named as discoverers of life in Eratosthenes five years later. Vandenburg later travels to Mars, Krasnin to the inner Solar System.		
Eldon Galbraithe, Dr. (Commander); Herbert Ellis (Radio Operator); John Borden, Dr. (Scientist); Henry Jaffe (Engineer)	World Without End (a.k.a. Flight to the Future) (1956), film	United States: MRX	March 1957
Eldon Galbraithe, Dr. (Commander); Herbert Ellis (Radio Operator); John Borden, Dr. (Scientist); Henry Jaffe (Engineer)	Astronauts returning from Mars orbital mission travel forward in time to the year 2508.		
Jonathan Bork, Capt. Jenkins (no first name given); Unnamed pilots	"Captain Bedlam" (1957), short story	Unknown	Future
Jonathan Bork, Capt. Jenkins (no first name given); Unnamed pilots	Pilots with induced multiple personalities fly spacecraft carrying cargo and hibernating passengers to the Moon, Mars and Jupiter 8.		
Chris Godfrey (UK); Serge Smyslov (USSR); Morrey Kant (USA); Tony Hale (UK)	Chris Godfrey of U.N.E.X.A. series (1957–1979), juvenile novels	Numerous, including Luna 1, Columbus, Lenin and Phoenix	Near Contemporary
Chris Godfrey (UK); Serge Smyslov (USSR); Morrey Kant (USA); Tony Hale (UK)	British astronaut who makes the first crewed spaceflight, launching from Woomera, and international colleagues who later join him in the "United Nations Exploration Agency" for missions to the Moon and all planets in the Solar System.		
Caldicott; Paul Bresh; McGuire; Stefano; Emanuel "Mannie" Mengild George Johnstown Graves, Col. (Commandant, Arizona Research Station)	"The Dark Star" (1957), short story	Unknown	Future
Caldicott; Paul Bresh; McGuire; Stefano; Emanuel "Mannie" Mengild George Johnstown Graves, Col. (Commandant, Arizona Research Station)	Candidates for first flight to the Moon. Bresh makes flight and is later a member of the Second Exploratory Party to Mars. Graves was a rocket pilot in the early days of crewed spaceflight.		
"Mighty" Maxon (Captain); 29 unnamed women	"Expedition" (1957), short short story	Unknown	Future
"Mighty" Maxon (Captain); 29 unnamed women	Captain of first major Mars expedition quickly impregnates all 29 of his crewmates.		
Norris Caird, Cmdr. (Pilot); Kerry (Medical Officer/Deputy Pilot/Navigator); John Patterson (US) (Electronics Officer); Robert Vaughan (Engineer/Geologist); Janet Ross (Stowaway)	High Vacuum (1957), novel	Ministry of Astronautics (M.O.A.) (UK): Alpha	Near Future
Norris Caird, Cmdr. (Pilot); Kerry (Medical Officer/Deputy Pilot/Navigator); John Patterson (US) (Electronics Officer); Robert Vaughan (Engineer/Geologist); Janet Ross (Stowaway)	First crewed Moon rocket crash-lands in Mare Imbrium due to added weight of stowaway.		
Bruce G. Davis Jr. Marvin Oldbury	"Ideas Die Hard" (1957), short story	Project Deep Space (US)	Near Future
Bruce G. Davis Jr. Marvin Oldbury	Astronauts attempt to learn why three uncrewed spacecraft failed on way to the Moon.		
Dave Woodbury; John Hansen	"Insert Knob A in Hole B" (1957), short short story	Space Station A5	Future
Dave Woodbury; John Hansen	Astronauts plagued by ambiguous assembly instructions for equipment.		
Harper (Captain); Jantz, Prof. (Mathematician/Astronomer); Jackson, Dr. (Geologist); Holt, Dr. (Chemist); Pegram (Navigator); Davis (Engineer) (no first names given)	"Intruders" (1957), short story	Executive Council, Expedition H.Q. (a.k.a. Organization Headquarters); Advance Expedition: Lunar Base One	Future
Harper (Captain); Jantz, Prof. (Mathematician/Astronomer); Jackson, Dr. (Geologist); Holt, Dr. (Chemist); Pegram (Navigator); Davis (Engineer) (no first names given)	First expedition to the Moon establishes underground base near Tycho, but must fight unexpected enemies.		
Baird (Skipper/Pilot) (no first name given); Hernandez (Engineer) (no first name given); Unnamed instrument man	"The Light" (1957), short story	United States: Benjamin Franklin	Near Future
Baird (Skipper/Pilot) (no first name given); Hernandez (Engineer) (no first name given); Unnamed instrument man	First Americans on the Moon explore the crater Plato and discover outgassing of water vapor and evidence that someone has been there before them. Benjamin Franklin launches to Moon from space station in Earth orbit. Adapted into X Minus One episode in October 1957.		
Communications Satellite Two: Unnamed (Narrator); Sven Olsen (Construction); Jock Duncan (Cook/Doctor); Jim (no last name given) (Engineer); Gregory "Gregg" Wendell (Junior station announcer); Unnamed (Head of transport section); Unnamed crewmembers Solar Observatory: Julie (no last name given) (Solar physicist); Unnamed crewmembers Starfire: Stevens (Captain); Unnamed crewmembers	The Other Side of the Sky (1957), series of short stories	Space Service: Communications Satellite Two (a.k.a. Relay Two); Solar Observatory Starfire	Late 1970s January 1, 2001
Communications Satellite Two: Unnamed (Narrator); Sven Olsen (Construction); Jock Duncan (Cook/Doctor); Jim (no last name given) (Engineer); Gregory "Gregg" Wendell (Junior station announcer); Unnamed (Head of transport section); Unnamed crewmembers Solar Observatory: Julie (no last name given) (Solar physicist); Unnamed crewmembers Starfire: Stevens (Captain); Unnamed crewmembers	Workers building communications relay satellite and studying Sun in late 1970s. In 2001 narrator's son departs aboard Starfire, flagship of ten-ship Mars expedition.		
Harry Ross (Flight Commander); Brainerd (First Astrogator); Lon Curtis (Second Astrogator) "Doc" Spangler (Psych Officer); Krinsky (Accumulator Tech); Llewellyn; Fallbridge (Note: Also spelled "Falbridge".); Dominic	"Sunrise On Mercury" (1957), short story	Second Mercury Expedition: Leverrier	Future
Harry Ross (Flight Commander); Brainerd (First Astrogator); Lon Curtis (Second Astrogator) "Doc" Spangler (Psych Officer); Krinsky (Accumulator Tech); Llewellyn; Fallbridge; Dominic	Second crew to land on Mercury encounters telepathic lifeform.		
Robert Calder, Col. (Commander); Sharman, Dr. (Chief scientist); 15 unnamed crewmembers	20 Million Miles to Earth (a.k.a. The Giant Ymir, The Beast from Space) (1957), film	United States Air Force; Project 5: XY-21 (single-stage rocket)	Near Future
Robert Calder, Col. (Commander); Sharman, Dr. (Chief scientist); 15 unnamed crewmembers	13-month round-trip mission to Venus brings back egg of dinosaur-like creature.		
Argus II: Moran (Captain); Sinkley (Pilot); Beckett (Chief Engineer); Kranolsky, Dr. (Medical Officer) "Sparks" (Radio Operator); Unnamed crewmembers	"Welcoming Committee" (1957), short story	Argus; Argus II	Future
Argus II: Moran (Captain); Sinkley (Pilot); Beckett (Chief Engineer); Kranolsky, Dr. (Medical Officer) "Sparks" (Radio Operator); Unnamed crewmembers	Crew of second Mars mission searches for missing crew of first mission.		
Ferranti; Smith MR-1: Hank Williams, Lt. Bill, Lt. (Navigator) (no last name given)	"Critical Angle" (1958), short story	Rocket Service (US): MR-1	Near Future
Ferranti; Smith MR-1: Hank Williams, Lt. Bill, Lt. (Navigator) (no last name given)	First crewed spacecraft on the Moon is trapped by dust in Copernicus, but breaks free with unexpected consequences.		
John McLaren, Prof. (US)	The Day the Sky Exploded (a.k.a. Death Comes from Outer Space) (1958), film	US/Russia/UK: X-Z atomic rocket	Near Future
John McLaren, Prof. (US)	First attempted circumnavigation of Moon results in Earth being threatened with meteorite bombardment.		
Max Canning	"First Man in a Satellite" (1958), short story	United States	Near Future
Max Canning	Three-foot-tall dancer and tumbler, a test subject rather than a pilot, becomes first human in space aboard spherical capsule within blunt-winged spacecraft.		
Romer; Temple S-2: Ken Pickering (USAF) Aztec: Adam Philip Crag (Commander); Max Edward Prochaska (Electronics Chief); Gordon Wells Nagel (Oxygen systems); Igor Malin (impersonating Martin LeRoy Larkwell) (Mechanical maintenance/construction) Astronaut: Michael Gotch, Col. (USAF); Fredrick Gunter (Secretary-General of the United Nations); Unnamed pilot Two unnamed crewmembers "Bandit": Otto Richter (East Germany) (Scientist); Two unnamed crewmembers "Red Dog": Four unnamed crewmembers	First on the Moon (1958), novel	United States Air Force; Step One: S-2 (Satelloid); Aztec; Astronaut (atomic spacecraft) "Eastern World": "Bandit" "Red Dog"	Near Future
Romer; Temple S-2: Ken Pickering (USAF) Aztec: Adam Philip Crag (Commander); Max Edward Prochaska (Electronics Chief); Gordon Wells Nagel (Oxygen systems); Igor Malin (impersonating Martin LeRoy Larkwell) (Mechanical maintenance/construction) Astronaut: Michael Gotch, Col. (USAF); Fredrick Gunter (Secretary-General of the United Nations); Unnamed pilot Two unnamed crewmembers "Bandit": Otto Richter (East Germany) (Scientist); Two unnamed crewmembers "Red Dog": Four unnamed crewmembers	American mission to establish moonbase in Arzachel crater is opposed by unnamed "enemy" power from behind Iron Curtain, and complicated by presence of ringer in crew. Pickering is first human in space aboard "satelloid", a spaceplane with small wings.		
Van Wyck (Captain); Byron; Pat Gilvey, Dr. Marvin T. "Chowderhead" Roebuck; Sam; Wally	"The Hated" (1958), short story	Unknown	Future
Van Wyck (Captain); Byron; Pat Gilvey, Dr. Marvin T. "Chowderhead" Roebuck; Sam; Wally	Crew of Mars mission returns to Earth wanting to kill each other.		
Challenge 141: Edward Carruthers, Col. Nine unnamed crewmembers Challenge 142: Van Heusen, Col. (Commander); Ann Anderson (Geologist/Archeologist); James Calder, Lt. Bob Finelli; Gino Finelli; Joseph Kienholz (Biologist); John Purdue, Maj. Eric Royce, Dr. Mary Royce, Dr. (Physician)	It! The Terror from Beyond Space (a.k.a. It, The Vampire from Outer Space) (1958), film	United States Space Commission: Challenge 141; Challenge 142	July 1973
Challenge 141: Edward Carruthers, Col. Nine unnamed crewmembers Challenge 142: Van Heusen, Col. (Commander); Ann Anderson (Geologist/Archeologist); James Calder, Lt. Bob Finelli; Gino Finelli; Joseph Kienholz (Biologist); John Purdue, Maj. Eric Royce, Dr. Mary Royce, Dr. (Physician)	Carruthers, the sole survivor of the first expedition to Mars, is accused of murdering his fellow crewmembers.		
Joan Jones	Joan of Arkansas (1958), TV	United States	Contemporary/Near Future
Joan Jones	Unsold sitcom pilot about dental technician chosen to become first human on Moon.		
Stepan Mikhailovich Ivankov, Maj. (Note: Patronymic not given; deduced from father's name.) Bryant "Bud" Ashland, Capt. (USAF)	"The Manned Missiles" (1958), short story	Soviet Union United States	Contemporary/Near Future
Stepan Mikhailovich Ivankov, Maj. Bryant "Bud" Ashland, Capt. (USAF)	Ivankov, the first man in space, and Ashland, the first American in space, die when their spacecraft collide in orbit.		
Steve Dayton; June Saxton; Gary Fennell (Convict); Lon (Convict)	Missile to the Moon (1958), film	Unknown	Near Future
Steve Dayton; June Saxton; Gary Fennell (Convict); Lon (Convict)	Rocket researchers and escaped convicts encounter female lunar inhabitants. Loose remake of Cat-Women of the Moon (q.v.).		
Junius Robb, Capt. (USAF); Anderson (First Officer); Hamston (Rocket expert); Kingsley (US Army) (Radio operator); Farnsworth (Astrogator)	"Moon Glow" (1958), short story	Project Ajax (?); Ajax XX	Near Future
Junius Robb, Capt. (USAF); Anderson (First Officer); Hamston (Rocket expert); Kingsley (US Army) (Radio operator); Farnsworth (Astrogator)	First Americans to land on the moon.		
John Corcoran, Maj.	Night of the Blood Beast (a.k.a. Creature from Galaxy 27) (1958), film	X-100	Contemporary/Near Future
John Corcoran, Maj.	First man launched into orbit; seemingly dies on reentry.		
British Satellite Station: Unnamed commander George Montgomery "Ticker" Troon, Flt Lt, VC; Nobby; Dobbin; Unnamed crewmembers British Moon-Station: Michael Troon (Station-Commander); Reeves (Sub-Commander); Calmore (Sub-Commander); Ellen (Physician) (no last name given); Hughes; Witley, Sgt. Unnamed crewmembers Soviet Moon-Station: Alexei Goudenkovitch Budorieff, Gen. (Red Army) (Commander); Zinochek, Col. 354 unnamed crewmembers Figurão: Raul Campaneiro (Commander); Geoffrey Montgomery Trunho, Capt. (Navigator); Camilo Botoes, Lt. (Electronics Officer/Geologist)	The Outward Urge (1958), novel	British Satellite Station British Moon-Station; Soviet Moon-Station Skyforce, Space Division (Estados Unidos do Brasil): E.U.B. Spacevessel Figurão	November 1994 2044 December 9, 2093 – June 24, 2094
In 1994, Ticker Troon sacrifices himself to save British Satellite Station from enemy missile. Fifty years later, his son Michael commands British Moon-Station in Archimedes crater during nuclear war on Earth which results in destruction of American Moon-Station in Copernicus and Soviet Moon-Station in Ptolemy. In 2094, Michael's great-grandson Geoff is fatally stranded on Mars after first crewed landing when Figurão becomes disabled. Landing on April 18, 2094, in Isidis-Syrtis Major area at 48°N 275°E.
Starfire: Neil (Note: Spelled "Neal" in DVD subtitles.) Patterson, Capt. (Commander); Michael Cruze, Lt. Larry Turner, Lt. (USAF) (Navigator); Konrad, Prof. (Dr.) (Passenger) (no first name given) Space Station A: Berger (no first name given); Unnamed crewmembers	Queen of Outer Space (a.k.a. Queen of the Universe) (1958), film	United States: Starfire (TF-5); Space Station A	1985
Starfire: Neil Patterson, Capt. (Commander); Michael Cruze, Lt. Larry Turner, Lt. (USAF) (Navigator); Konrad, Prof. (Dr.) (Passenger) (no first name given) Space Station A: Berger (no first name given); Unnamed crewmembers	Rays from Venus destroy space station and send ferry rocket Starfire off course to that planet. Patterson and his crew were the first men to orbit the Moon.		
Holt, Maj. Gen. (Commander of space station); Kelly, Capt. (later promoted to Major); Unnamed sergeant Unnamed technician Other unnamed crewmembers	Race for the Moon "The Thing on Sputnik 4!" (1958), comic	United States: Rotating wheel space station	Near Future
Holt, Maj. Gen. (Commander of space station); Kelly, Capt. (later promoted to Major); Unnamed sergeant Unnamed technician Other unnamed crewmembers	Military astronaut Kelly encounters alien creature clinging to Sputnik 4.		
American satellite: Morgan (Commander) "Shorty" Kaufman (Astronomer) "Mac" McNary (Meteorologist) Russian satellite: Three unnamed cosmonauts	"Satellite Passage" (1958), short story	American satellite Russian satellite	Near Future
American satellite: Morgan (Commander) "Shorty" Kaufman (Astronomer) "Mac" McNary (Meteorologist) Russian satellite: Three unnamed cosmonauts	American and Russian crews on near-collision course.		
Morley; Unnamed trainees Mars mission: Tony Bannerman, Lt. Hal Mendoza	"Simulated Trainer" (1958), short story	Unknown (United States)	Future
Morley; Unnamed trainees Mars mission: Tony Bannerman, Lt. Hal Mendoza	Military astronauts on simulated Mars mission which turns out not to be a simulation.		
David Boyer (Astronomer); John Compo (Astronomical Engineer); Sybil Carrington (Researcher); Howard Lazar, Dr. (Physician); Unnamed crewmembers	War of the Satellites (1958), film	United Nations: Project Sigma	Near Future
David Boyer (Astronomer); John Compo (Astronomical Engineer); Sybil Carrington (Researcher); Howard Lazar, Dr. (Physician); Unnamed crewmembers	Crew launched aboard three spacecraft which merge into single satellite in attempt to breach alien quarantine of Earth.		
Unnamed (Space Station Supervisor); Unnamed doctors	"Who's There?" (1958), short story	Space Station	Early 1980s
Unnamed (Space Station Supervisor); Unnamed doctors	Spaceman hears mysterious noises during spacewalk. Bernie Summers named as earlier spacewalk casualty.		
Brice Rogers	World's Finest Comics "The Menace of the Moonman!" (1958), comic	Unknown	Contemporary/Near Future
Brice Rogers	Pilot of first crewed space rocket, hurled into lunar orbit by Superman; he flies through a comet's tail and becomes the super-powered Moonman.		
Thomas O'Bannion, Col. (USAF) (Pilot/Navigator); Iris "Irish" Ryan, Dr. (Biologist/Zoologist); Theodore Gettell, Prof. (Scientist); Sam Jacobs, CWO (Electronics/Radar)	The Angry Red Planet (a.k.a. Invasion of Mars) (1959), film	MR-1	Near Future
Thomas O'Bannion, Col. (USAF) (Pilot/Navigator); Iris "Irish" Ryan, Dr. (Biologist/Zoologist); Theodore Gettell, Prof. (Scientist); Sam Jacobs, CWO (Electronics/Radar)	First crewed Mars mission encounters bizarre dangers.		
Space Station JSS3: Unnamed personnel SPIP; Ship 1: Kenjiro Adachi, Dr. (Prof.) (Commander); Ichiro Katsumiya, Maj. (Chief); Araki; Yuichi Iwamura (Navigator); Kogure; Okada; Pierce (Gunner); Etsuko Shiraishi (Radio) Ship 2: Roger Richardson, Dr. (Prof.) (Commander); Nomura (Chief); Komeda; Sato; Sylvia (Radio) (no last name given); 3 other crewmembers Fighter rockets: Unnamed pilots	Battle in Outer Space (a.k.a. The World of Space) (1959), film	Space Station JSS3 United Nations (F.F.E.); SPIP: Ship 1 Ship 2 Fighter rockets	1965
Space Station JSS3: Unnamed personnel SPIP; Ship 1: Kenjiro Adachi, Dr. (Prof.) (Commander); Ichiro Katsumiya, Maj. (Chief); Araki; Yuichi Iwamura (Navigator); Kogure; Okada; Pierce (Gunner); Etsuko Shiraishi (Radio) Ship 2: Roger Richardson, Dr. (Prof.) (Commander); Nomura (Chief); Komeda; Sato; Sylvia (Radio) (no last name given); 3 other crewmembers Fighter rockets: Unnamed pilots	Earth fights hostile aliens from planet Natal. Two SPIP ships fly to Moon to investigate alien base near Mare Marginis.		
Space station: James Benedict, Dr. (Director of US space program) "Matt" Matthews, Col. (Ship commander); Kurt Easton, Dr. (Observer); Unnamed astronauts Lunar spacecraft: Dave Reynolds (Commander); Three unnamed astronauts	Destination Space (1959), TV movie	Space Station B.B. ("Benedict's Billions") (US); Lunar spacecraft (US)	Near Future
Space station: James Benedict, Dr. (Director of US space program) "Matt" Matthews, Col. (Ship commander); Kurt Easton, Dr. (Observer); Unnamed astronauts Lunar spacecraft: Dave Reynolds (Commander); Three unnamed astronauts	Failed attempts to launch first lunar orbit mission from space station.		
Stone, Capt. Barton; Leon; Merriweather; Parkhurst; Vecchi (no first names given)	"Explorers We" (1959), short story	Earth-Mars Expedition	Near Future (April 9 – Late July)
Stone, Capt. Barton; Leon; Merriweather; Parkhurst; Vecchi (no first names given)	Six-man crew of 18-month round-trip Mars landing mission encounters fear and hostility upon landing near Burlingame, California.		
Moonship: McRoberts, Maj. (Commander) (First name not given); Brad Summers, Capt. (Copilot) Space Station: Anderson, Col. (Commander) (First name not given); Milton, Dr. (Astronomer) (First name not given); Unnamed crewmembers Ferry rocket: Unnamed pilot	First Boy on the Moon (1959), novel	United States Space Force: Moonship; Space Station; Ferry rocket	Near Future
Moonship: McRoberts, Maj. (Commander) (First name not given); Brad Summers, Capt. (Copilot) Space Station: Anderson, Col. (Commander) (First name not given); Milton, Dr. (Astronomer) (First name not given); Unnamed crewmembers Ferry rocket: Unnamed pilot	Two boys and a frog stow away on the first crewed mission to the Moon.		
Dan Milton Prescott, Lt. (USN)	First Man into Space (a.k.a. Satellite of Blood) (1959), film	United States Navy: Y-12 spaceplane Y-13 spaceplane	Near Future
Dan Milton Prescott, Lt. (USN)	Air Force Space Command pilot flies plane into space, returns as monster.		
Unnamed astronaut (US)	"The Man Who Lost the Sea" (1959), short story	Alpha (booster); Beta (booster); Gamma (Mars lander); Delta (Earth return ship)	Future (c. late 20th century)
Unnamed astronaut (US)	Astronaut dying after crash-landing on Mars.		
Rodina/Mercury: Eugene Kornev/Albert Gordon, Dr. (Scientist); Andrei Gordienko/Craig Matthews Typhoon: Robert Klark/Torrance, Capt. Erwin Verst/Dan Martin, Dr. Meteor: Gregory Somov/Paul Clinton	Nebo Zovyot (1959), film Battle Beyond the Sun (1962), film	Space station Rodina ("Homeland")/Mercury; Typhoon; Meteor	Future (Nebo Zovyot) November 1997 (Battle Beyond the Sun)
Rodina/Mercury: Eugene Kornev/Albert Gordon, Dr. (Scientist); Andrei Gordienko/Craig Matthews Typhoon: Robert Klark/Torrance, Capt. Erwin Verst/Dan Martin, Dr. Meteor: Gregory Somov/Paul Clinton	Soviet film re-edited for American release with names changed. Rodina/Mercury and Typhoon (nations of origin unspecified in Soviet version; "South Hemis" and "North Hemis" in American version) both attempt first Mars flight, but an emergency rescue leads to a landing on the asteroid Icarus instead. The events in the Soviet version turn out to be a dream. South Hemis' Mars mission called "Project Red Planet" in American version.		
Unnamed (USSR) (Chief Co-ordinator of Project Ares); Jim Hutchins (US) (Assistant); Hutchins' wife (unnamed)	"Out of the Cradle, Endlessly Orbiting..." (1959), short story	Astronautics Authority: First Lunar Base Project Ares; Alpha; Beta; Gamma	1977
Unnamed (USSR) (Chief Co-ordinator of Project Ares); Jim Hutchins (US) (Assistant); Hutchins' wife (unnamed)	First crewed Mars expedition in preparation at lunar base inside crater Plato; meanwhile, Hutchins' son is first human born off-Earth. References to past events include US Navy rescue of cosmonaut Dimitri Kalinin in South Pacific; Jerry Wingate making first crewed orbit of Moon; landing of Hermann Oberth in Bay of Rainbows with loss of crew members.		
Mike Ferris, Sgt. (USAF)	The Twilight Zone; Where Is Everybody? (1959), TV	United States Air Force	Contemporary
Mike Ferris, Sgt. (USAF)	Air Force astronaut trainee hallucinates himself in empty town during isolation experiment.		
Stafford (no first name given) Traill; Henderson (no first names given) Trevor; Woodford; Fox (no first names given) John Jenkin, Lt.	"Forms of Things Unknown" (1966), short story	High Command	Near Future
Stafford (no first name given) Traill; Henderson (no first names given) Trevor; Woodford; Fox (no first names given) John Jenkin, Lt.	In posthumously published story by C. S. Lewis, first four crewed missions to the Moon all end with contact abruptly lost with crews.		
