= The Past Through Tomorrow =

Science fiction story collection by Robert A. Heinlein

- First edition (publ. Putnam); Cover art by Ben Feder
- Author: Robert A. Heinlein
- Language: English
- Publisher: Putnam
- Publication date: 1967
- LC Class: PZ3.H364 Pas

The Past Through Tomorrow is a collection of science fiction stories by American writer Robert A. Heinlein, first published in 1967, all part of his Future History.

Most of the stories are parts of a larger storyline about the future rapid collapse of sanity in the United States, followed by a theocratic dictatorship, a revolution, and the establishment of a free society that does not save the pseudo-immortal Lazarus Long and the Howard families from fleeing Earth for their lives. Most editions of the collection include a timeline showing the chronology of the stories (including stories never written, such as "The Stone Pillow", which was to occur during the period of the theocracy), times of birth and death of the significant characters, and commentary by Heinlein.

Contents:

- "Life-Line", 1939
- "Misfit", 1939
- "The Roads Must Roll", 1940
- "Requiem", 1940
- "'If This Goes On—'", 1940
- "Coventry", 1940
- "Blowups Happen", 1940
- "Methuselah's Children", 1941
- "Logic of Empire", 1941
- "'—We Also Walk Dogs'", 1941
- "Space Jockey", 1947
- "'It's Great to Be Back!'", 1947
- "The Green Hills of Earth", 1947
- "Ordeal in Space", 1948
- "The Long Watch", 1948
- "Gentlemen, Be Seated!", 1948
- "The Black Pits of Luna", 1948
- "Delilah and the Space Rigger", 1949
- "The Man Who Sold the Moon", 1950
- "The Menace from Earth", 1957
- "Searchlight", 1962

== Reception ==
While regretting that several Future History stories Heinlein planned were never written, Algis Budrys praised the collection as "some of the finest writing this field has ever known". He described the book as "a magnificent compendium, coincidentally a rewarding and perhaps accurate cross-section of a writer's career", and required for any science fiction library. In February 1968 he named the book the "best publishing idea of the year".
