= The Robert Heinlein Interview and Other Heinleiniana =

- First Trade Paperback Cover
- Author: J. Neil Schulman
- Subject: Science fiction, libertarianism
- Publisher: Pulpless.com
- Publication date: May 1999
- Media type: Trade Paperback
- Pages: 200
- ISBN: 1-58445-015-0
- OCLC: 42842029

The Robert Heinlein Interview and other Heinleiniana is non-fiction collection about science fiction author Robert A. Heinlein. Written by J. Neil Schulman from 1972 through 1988, the book was first published in 1990.

== Contents ==
The book consists of 15 articles by Schulman and a foreword by Brad Linaweaver. Four of these articles are previously published reviews of Heinlein's novels Revolt in 2100, Time Enough for Love, Job: A Comedy of Justice and The Moon Is a Harsh Mistress. Another four are letters detailing how the book came about. Two are essays on Heinlein as an author, and the rest are introductions and afterthoughts about the Heinlein interview.

More than half of the book consists of the transcript of a three-and-a-half hour taped interview with Heinlein that Schulman conducted by telephone in June 1973. Subjects Heinlein talks about include evolution, general semantics, art and commercialism, the space program, kinds of libertarianism, sex, communism, his Future History series, high school reading lists, science fiction writing, the afterlife, UFOs, house building, artificial intelligence and voting rights.

== Publishing history ==
- SoftServ Publishing Services, Inc. (digital edition), 1990.
- Pulpless.Com (digital edition), 1996.
- Pulpless.Com, Inc. (trade paperback), 1999. LCCN 98-83271
- Pulpless.Com (Amazon Kindle edition), March 8, 2017
