= The Black Pits of Luna =

1948 short story by Robert A. Heinlein

- Short story by Robert A. Heinlein
- Title page of its initial publication in The Saturday Evening Post
- Country: United States
- Language: English
- Genre: science fiction

Publication
- Published in: The Saturday Evening Post
- Published in English: January 10, 1948

"The Black Pits of Luna" is a science fiction short story by American writer Robert A. Heinlein, about a Boy Scout on a trip to the Moon and his novel way of finding his lost brother. Included as part of his Future History, it originally appeared in The Saturday Evening Post, January 10, 1948, and was collected in The Green Hills of Earth (and subsequently The Past Through Tomorrow).

== Synopsis ==
The short story is told from the viewpoint of Dick Logan, a Boy Scout who has accompanied his father on a business trip to the Moon alongside his mother and little brother, "Baby Darling". They're encouraged to visit the Black Pits of Luna on the back side of the Moon, however upon arriving they are told that the tour is too dangerous for small children. Unwilling to deny their "Baby Darling", the parents raise a fuss until they are permitted to use a small space suit that had been special ordered for an elite's daughter. Dick is instructed to watch over his brother, but once on the tour he quickly becomes enthralled by the Black Pits' landscape and history.

As the tour comes to an end the family discovers that Baby Darling has wandered off. Searches are made for the child, however no one is able to locate the boy, who is at risk of running out of oxygen. Dick volunteers to help and quickly realizes that his brother would see the Pits as an excellent place to play hide-and-seek. He searches several locations matching his brother's favorite hiding spots, using his size to access spaces that grown men would be too big to search. He eventually succeeds in finding his brother, who has passed out in a small crevice. The short ends with the parents swearing to never return to the Moon while Dick himself plans on eventually returning.

== Publication history ==
"The Black Pits of Luna" was first published in The Saturday Evening Post on January 10, 1948 and featured illustrations by Fred Ludekens. It was later re-printed in The Green Hills of Earth and subsequently The Past Through Tomorrow. The short has been translated into multiple languages.

Per Jerome Winter, "The Black Pits of Luna" is one of four short stories that helped Heinlein reach a more mainstream market via The Saturday Evening Post, the other four being "The Green Hills of Earth” (1947), “Space Jockey” (1947), and “It’s Great to Be Back!” (1947).

== Critical reception and themes ==
In her 2019 book The Pleasant Profession of Robert A. Heinlein Farah Mendlesohn wrote that the character of Dick is portrayed as more responsible than his entitled parents, which she states is implied to be a result of his participation in the Boy Scouts. The short story was praised in the Journal of College Science Teaching by William R. Brice, who stated that "Although the plot and story line are somewhat juvenile, the descriptions of the lunar surface are excellent."

George Slusser criticized the portrayal of the unnamed mother character, further noting that Heinlein frequently received criticism from feminists because "he presents women who do domestic duty as irrevocably stupid."

== See also ==
- "Searchlight (short story)"
