= Green Hills of Earth (disambiguation) =

The Green Hills of Earth is a short story by Robert A. Heinlein.

Green Hills of Earth may also refer to:

- The Green Hills of Earth (short story collection) by Robert A. Heinlein
- Green Hills of Earth (album) by The Mother Hips
