= Flower of Forgetfulness =

Flower of Forgetfulness may refer to one of the following

- Poppy
- Daylily
- Hemerocallis fulva
- A museum porcelain piece featured in Robert A. Heinlein's story, "—We Also Walk Dogs"
