= Out There (1951 TV series) =

1951 American television series

Out There is a science fiction television program that was broadcast live on Sundays at 6:00 p.m. EST on CBS Television from October 28, 1951 through January 13, 1952. It was one of the first science fiction anthology series, and one of the first shows to mix filmed special effects with live action. It only lasted twelve half-hour episodes before being cancelled. The awkward time slot may have led to its failure. In its short run, the program featured episodes adapted from stories by (and in some cases written by) authors including Robert A. Heinlein, Ray Bradbury, Theodore Sturgeon, John D. MacDonald, Murray Leinster, Frank Belknap Long and Milton Lesser. After its initial cancellation, there was at least one report that the network planned on reviving it, but this did not happen.

Donald Davis produced the program.

== Episode list ==
No. in season	Title	Directed by	Written by	Original release date
1	"Outer Limit" "The Outer Limit"	Byron Paul and Andrew McCullough	Elhu Winer, after Graham Doar	October 28, 1951
2	"Ordeal in Space"	Unknown	Edward Waldo, after Robert A. Heinlein's Ordeal in Space	November 4, 1951
3	"The Sense of Wonder"	Unknown	Howard Rodman, after Milton Lesser	November 11, 1951
4	"Misfit"	Unknown	Joseph Kramm, after Heinlein's Misfit	November 18, 1951
5	"Susceptibility"	Unknown	David Shaw, after John D. MacDonald	November 25, 1951
6	"The Green Hills of Earth"	Unknown	Raphael Hayes, after Heinlein's The Green Hills of Earth	December 2, 1951
7	"Mewhu's Jet"	Unknown	Edward Waldo, after Theodore Sturgeon	December 9, 1951
An alien crashes on a farm.
8	"Seven Temporary Moons"	Unknown	Murray Leinster	December 16, 1951
Seven new moons threaten life on earth.
9	"The Man"	Unknown	Howard Rodman, after Ray Bradbury	December 23, 1951
10	"The Bus to Nowhere"	Unknown	Reginald Rose	December 30, 1951
11	"Guest in the House"	Unknown	Frank Long, from Guest in the House (short story)	January 6, 1952
12	"The Castaway"	Unknown	Raphael Hayes	January 13, 1952

== Guest stars ==
Actors appearing in the series included:

- Ray Danton
- John Ericson
- Eileen Heckart
- Bethel Leslie
- Leslie Nielsen
- Kim Stanley
- Rod Steiger
- Robert Webber
