= The Menace from Earth =

"The Menace From Earth"
- Short story by Robert A. Heinlein
- Country: United States
- Language: English
- Genre: Science fiction

Publication
- Published in: The Magazine of Fantasy & Science Fiction
- Publication type: Magazine
- Media type: Print (Periodical & Paperback)
- Publication date: August 1957

"The Menace From Earth" is a science fiction short story by American writer Robert A. Heinlein, first published in the August 1957 issue of The Magazine of Fantasy & Science Fiction.

== Plot summary ==
The story is set in the near future, when the Moon is colonized with people living in underground cities. The "menace" of the title is a glamorous woman tourist who visits the Moon colony. She is assigned a young guide named Holly, a 15-year-old girl and aspiring starship designer who is the first-person narrator. Holly's best friend Jeff develops a crush on the "groundhog" visitor, Ariel. As Jeff spends more time with Ariel, Holly becomes jealous and begins to doubt his friendship.

Living in an underground city on the Moon, Holly and Jeff's hobby is flying with strap-on wings in a great cavern, made possible because the gravity field is one sixth the strength of Earth's and the air pressure in the cavern is kept high enough. Ariel wants to try flying, and Holly, in order not to appear jealous, offers to teach her. However, during her first flight, Ariel loses control at a great height, falling toward the ground. Holly swoops down and saves her life, breaking both arms in the process as she cushions Ariel's fall.

In the hospital afterward, Ariel gently explains some things to Holly. Ariel is twice the age of the teenagers, and could never be romantically interested in Jeff. More to the point, Jeff is not in love with her but with Holly. Ariel tells how in the aftermath of the crash Jeff arrived "like an avenging angel", ignoring Ariel to cradle the unconscious Holly in his arms, sobbing.

Following this revelation, Jeff arrives in the hospital room and Ariel tactfully leaves the two alone. After some embarrassed banter, Jeff kisses Holly for the first time.

== Analysis ==
One of Heinlein's stories written from a female perspective, with his typically strong, independent, capable (for this era) female protagonist. It effectively contrasts a traditional teenage romance story against realistically drawn details of everyday life as a colonist on the Moon.

== Relationship to other Heinlein works ==
"The Man Who Sold the Moon" sets the basis for lunar exploration and development in Heinlein's Future History. The lunar colony in the story is described in more detail in The Moon is a Harsh Mistress. The memorial referred to in the story is set up in "The Black Pits of Luna". Holly is also one of the many Heinlein characters mentioned in The Number of the Beast.

== Reception ==
Floyd C. Gale of Galaxy Science Fiction called "The Menace from Earth" a "startler", praising it as a Ladies Home Journal story "set in a wildly imaginative alien environment".
