= The Green Hills of Earth (short story collection) =

1951 collection of science fiction short stories by Robert A. Heinlein

- First Edition cover
- Author: Robert A. Heinlein
- Cover artist: Hubert Rogers
- Language: English
- Genre: Science fiction
- Publisher: Shasta Publishers
- Publication date: 1951
- Publication place: United States
- Media type: Print (hardback & paperback)
- Pages: 256
- OCLC: 1229091

The Green Hills of Earth is a collection of science fiction short stories by American writer Robert A. Heinlein, published in 1951, including short stories published as early as 1941. The stories are part of Heinlein's Future History. The title story is the tale of an old space mariner reflecting upon his planet of birth. According to an acknowledgement at the beginning of the book, the phrase "the green hills of Earth" is derived from a story by C. L. Moore.

== Contents ==
The short stories are as follows, in the order they appear in the book:

- "Delilah and the Space Rigger" (1949; originally published in Blue Book)
- "Space Jockey" (1947; originally published in The Saturday Evening Post)
- "The Long Watch" (1949; originally published in The American Legion Magazine)
- "Gentlemen, Be Seated!" (1948; originally published in Argosy Magazine)
- "The Black Pits of Luna" (1948; originally published in The Saturday Evening Post)
- "It's Great to Be Back!" (1947; originally published in The Saturday Evening Post)
- "—We Also Walk Dogs" (1941; originally published in Astounding Science Fiction)
- "Ordeal in Space" (1948; originally published in Town & Country)
- "The Green Hills of Earth" (1947; originally published in The Saturday Evening Post)
- "Logic of Empire" (1941; originally published in Astounding Science Fiction)

All of the above stories were also included in the 1967 collection The Past Through Tomorrow.

== Reception ==
Boucher and McComas described the collection as "an outstanding book", noting that the "slick" stories published in non-genre magazines included "classics in a new form". P. Schuyler Miller noted that most of the contents were "simple stories of human reactions".
