= Future History (Heinlein) =

Series of stories by Robert A. Heinlein

Universe was a 1941 story from Heinlein's Future History series (shown here in the 1951 Dell edition).

The Future History is a series of science fiction stories written by American author Robert A. Heinlein (1907–1988). It describes a projected future of the human race from the middle of the 20th century through the early 23rd century. The term Future History was coined by John W. Campbell Jr. in the February 1941 issue of Astounding Science Fiction. Campbell published an early draft of Heinlein's chart of the series in the May 1941 issue.

Heinlein wrote most of the Future History stories early in his career, between 1939 and 1941 and between 1945 and 1950. Most of the Future History stories were collected in book form as The Past Through Tomorrow (1967), which also contains the final version of the chart. That collection does not include the 1941 novellas Universe and Common Sense; they were published together in book form as Orphans of the Sky in 1963.

Groff Conklin called the Future History "the greatest of all histories of tomorrow". It was nominated for the Hugo Award for Best All-Time Series in 1966, along with the Barsoom series by Edgar Rice Burroughs, the Lensman series by E. E. Smith, the Foundation series by Isaac Asimov, and The Lord of the Rings series by J. R. R. Tolkien, but lost to Asimov's Foundation series.

== Definition ==
For the most part, The Past Through Tomorrow defines a core group of stories that are clearly within the Future History series. However, Heinlein scholars generally agree that some stories not included in the anthology belong to the Future History series, and that some that are included are only weakly linked to it.

James Gifford adds Time Enough for Love, which was published after The Past Through Tomorrow, and also "Let There Be Light", which was not included in The Past Through Tomorrow, possibly because the collection editor disliked it or because Heinlein himself considered it to be inferior. However, he considers Time Enough for Love to be a borderline case. He considers The Number of the Beast, The Cat Who Walks Through Walls, and To Sail Beyond the Sunset to be too weakly linked to the Future History to be included.

Bill Patterson includes To Sail Beyond the Sunset, on the theory that the discrepancies between it and the rest of the Future History are explained by assigning it to the same "bundle of related timelines" in the "World as Myth" multiverse. However, he lists a number of stories that he believes were never really intended to be part of Future History, even though they were included in The Past Through Tomorrow: "Life-Line" (which was written before Heinlein published the Future History chart; however, Lazarus Long does reference the protagonist of "Life-Line" and his device in Time Enough for Love), "The Menace from Earth", "—We Also Walk Dogs", and the stories originally published in the Saturday Evening Post ("Space Jockey", "It's Great to Be Back!", "The Green Hills of Earth", and "The Black Pits of Luna"). He agrees with Gifford that "Let There Be Light" should be included. The story "—And He Built a Crooked House—" was included only in the pre-war chart and never since.

The Heinlein juveniles do not hew closely to the Future History outline. Gifford states that "Although the twelve juvenile novels are not completely inconsistent with the Future History, neither do they form a thorough match with that series for adult readers. It is not often recognized that they are a reasonably consistent 'Future History' of their own... At least one major story specified in the Future History chart, the revolution on Venus, ended up being told in the framework of the juveniles as Between Planets." The novel Variable Star, written by Spider Robinson from Heinlein's detailed outline, incorporates some elements of both the Future History (such as references to Nehemiah Scudder) and the universe of the Heinlein juveniles (for example, torch ships and faster-than-light telepathic communication between twins). The adult short story "The Long Watch", included in Future History story collections, connects to Space Cadet through the character of (John) Ezra Dahlquist, the central character of the first, memorialized in the second.

=== World as Myth ===
Patterson cites "World as Myth" as a way of accounting for the deviation of real history from Heinlein's imagined future as well as inconsistencies between stories, writing, "Heinlein in the World as Myth books redefined the Future History as a timeline (or bundle of related timelines) ... which allows the 'Future History' to be a hard-edged term and yet nevertheless contain inconsistencies (i.e., any inconsistency belongs to a closely-related timeline)."

== List of stories ==
Title	Original Publishing Date	Published In	Century	Timeline order	Collected In*
"Life-Line"	1939–08	Astounding Science-Fiction	20th	1	The Man Who Sold the Moon (1950)
"Let There Be Light"	1940–05	Super Science Stories	20th	2	The Man Who Sold the Moon (1950)†
"The Roads Must Roll"	1940–06	Astounding Science-Fiction	20th	3	The Man Who Sold the Moon (1950)
"Blowups Happen"	1940–09	Astounding Science-Fiction	20th	4	The Man Who Sold the Moon (1950)
The Man Who Sold the Moon	1950	Collection The Man Who Sold the Moon (1950)	20th	5	The Man Who Sold the Moon (1950)
"Delilah and the Space-Rigger"	1949–12	The Blue Book Magazine	20th	6	The Green Hills of Earth (1951)
"Space Jockey"	1947-04-26	The Saturday Evening Post	20th	7	The Green Hills of Earth (1951)
"Requiem"	1940–01	Astounding Science-Fiction	20th	8	The Man Who Sold the Moon (1950)
"The Long Watch"	1949–12	The American Legion Magazine	20th	9	The Green Hills of Earth (1951)
"Gentlemen, Be Seated!"	1948–05	Argosy	20th	10	The Green Hills of Earth (1951)
"The Black Pits of Luna"	1947-01-10	The Saturday Evening Post	20th	11	The Green Hills of Earth (1951)
"It's Great to Be Back!"	1947-07-26	The Saturday Evening Post	20th	12	The Green Hills of Earth (1951)
"'—We Also Walk Dogs'"	1941–07	Astounding Science-Fiction	20th	13	The Green Hills of Earth (1951)
"Searchlight"	1962–08	Scientific American	20th	14	
"Ordeal in Space"	1948–05	Town & Country	21st	15	The Green Hills of Earth (1951)
"The Green Hills of Earth"	1947-02-08	The Saturday Evening Post	21st	16	The Green Hills of Earth (1951)
Logic of Empire	1941–03	Astounding Science-Fiction	21st	17	The Green Hills of Earth (1951)
"The Menace from Earth"	1957–08	The Magazine of Fantasy and Science Fiction	21st	18	
"'If This Goes On—'"	1940–02	Astounding Science-Fiction	21st	19	Revolt in 2100 (1953)
"Coventry"	1940–07	Astounding Science-Fiction	21st	20	Revolt in 2100 (1953)
"Misfit"	1939–11	Astounding Science-Fiction	22nd	21	Revolt in 2100 (1953)
Methuselah's Children	1941–07	Astounding Science-Fiction	22nd	22	
Universe	1941–05	Astounding Science-Fiction	36th	23	Orphans of the Sky (1950)†
Common Sense	1940–10	Astounding Science-Fiction	36th	24	Orphans of the Sky (1950)†
Time Enough for Love	1973	Standalone novel	43rd	25	†
To Sail Beyond the Sunset	1987	Standalone novel	43rd	26	†

*All stories are also collected in The Past Through Tomorrow (1967) unless marked †

== Stories never written ==
The chart published in the collection Revolt in 2100 includes several unwritten stories, which Heinlein describes in a postscript. "Fire Down Below", about a revolution in Antarctica, would have been set in the early 21st century. Three more unwritten stories fill in the history from just before "Logic of Empire" in the early 21st century through the beginning of "If This Goes On—". "The Sound of His Wings" covers Nehemiah Scudder's early life as a television evangelist through his rise to power as the First Prophet. "Eclipse" describes independence movements on Mars and Venus. "The Stone Pillow" details the rise of the resistance movement from the early days of the theocracy through the beginning of "If This Goes On—".

These stories were key points in the Future History, so Heinlein gave a rough description of Nehemiah Scudder which made his reign easy to visualize—a combination of John Calvin, Girolamo Savonarola, Joseph Franklin Rutherford, and Huey Long. His rise to power began when one of his flock, the widow of a wealthy man who would have disapproved of Scudder, died and left him enough money to establish a television station. He then teamed up with an ex-Senator and hired a major advertising agency. He was soon famous even off-world—many bonded laborers on Venus saw him as a messianic figure. He had muscle as well—a re-creation of the Ku Klux Klan in everything but name. "Blood at the polls and blood in the streets, but Scudder won the election. The next election was never held." Though this period was integral to the human diaspora that would follow several hundred years later, Heinlein stated that he was never able to write them because they featured Scudder prominently; he "dislike(d) him too much".

Nehemiah Scudder already appears in Heinlein's earliest novel For Us, the Living: A Comedy of Customs (written 1938–1939, though first published in 2003). Scudder's early career as depicted in that book is virtually identical with the above—but with the crucial difference that in the earlier version Scudder is stopped at the last moment by the counter-mobilization of Libertarians, and despite mass voter intimidation carries only Tennessee and Alabama. In fact, the Libertarian regime seen in full bloom in that book's 2086 came into being in direct reaction to Scudder's attempt to impose puritanical mores on the entire American society.

== See also ==
- Golden Age of Science Fiction
