= Revolt in 2100 =

1953 science fiction collection by Robert A. Heinlein

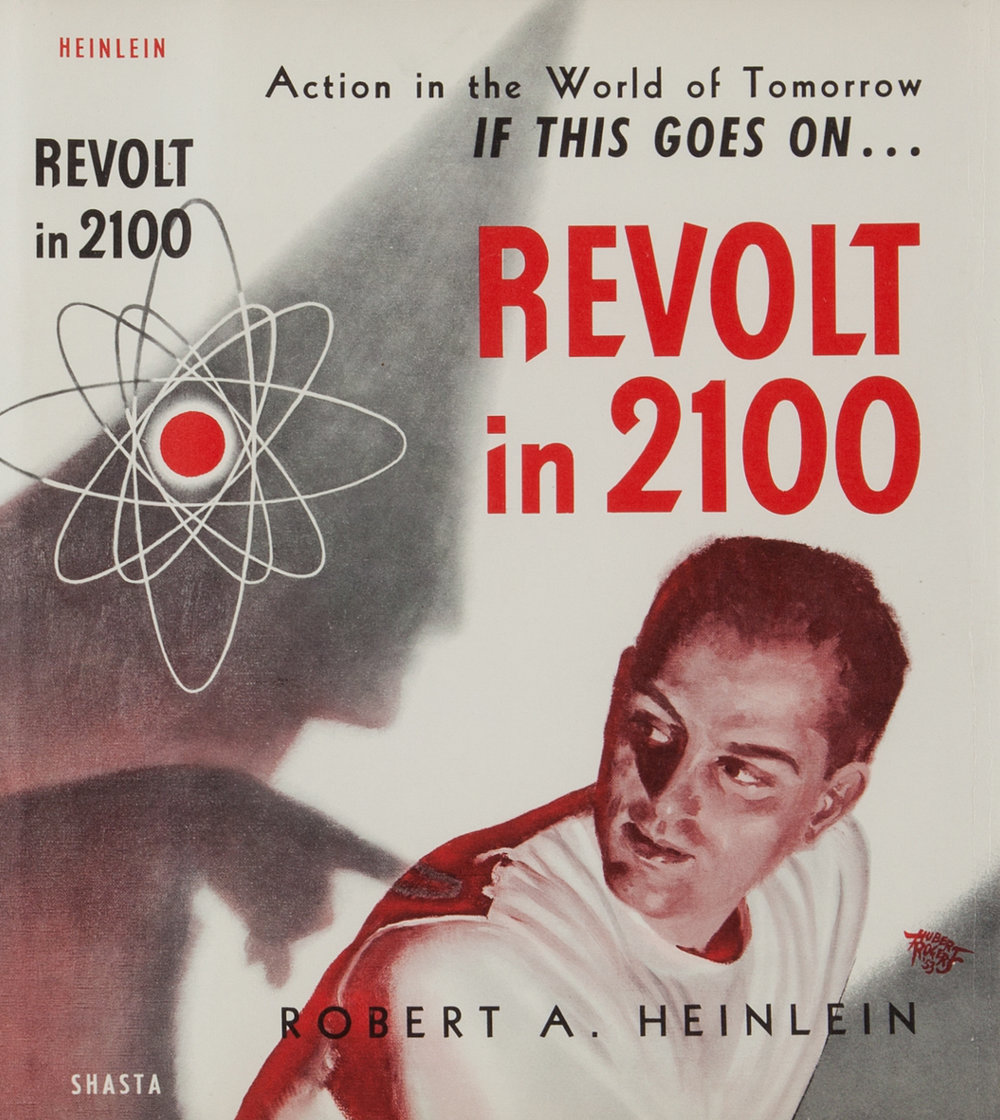
- First edition cover
- Author: Robert A. Heinlein
- Cover artist: Hubert Rogers
- Language: English
- Series: Future History
- Genre: Science fiction
- Published: 1953
- Publisher: Shasta Publishers
- Publication place: United States
- Media type: Print (hardback & paperback)
- Pages: 317
- OCLC: 1674023

Revolt in 2100 is a 1953 science fiction collection by American writer Robert A. Heinlein, part of his Future History series.

The book consists of:

- Foreword by Henry Kuttner: "The Innocent Eye"
- "If This Goes On—" (1940; originally published in Astounding Science Fiction)
- "Coventry" (1940; originally published in Astounding Science Fiction)
- "Misfit" (1939; originally published in Astounding Science Fiction)
- Afterword: "Concerning Stories Never Written"

"If This Goes On—" is a short novel detailing a rebellion against an American theocracy. Heinlein revised and expanded the magazine version for this publication. "Coventry" and "Misfit" are short stories showing the succeeding secular liberal society with "Coventry" presenting the point of view of characters who reject it.

The book's afterword describes three unwritten stories which would have described the beginning of the theocracy and the beginning of the rebellion against it. "The Sound of His Wings" would have followed a televangelist named Nehemiah Scudder who rode a populist, racist wave of support to the presidency. "Eclipse" would have described the subsequent collapse of American society, with emphasis on the withdrawal from space travel by the new regime. "The Stone Pillow" would have covered the rise of the rebellion which the protagonists of "If This Goes On—" later join.

Reviewer Groff Conklin described the book as "a classic" and the lead story as "a smashing tale of revolution in the United States". Boucher and McComas, however, described the collection as "[i]mpressive in its time, and important in the development of modern science fiction", but found it highly uneven, "with pages worthy of the mature 1954 Heinlein ... followed immediately by passages from the author's literary apprenticeship". P. Schuyler Miller found it to be "a distinctly minor Heinlein contribution, ... way below the mark Heinlein has set himself in his recent teen-age books".
