= Logic of Empire =

Novella exploring slavery by Robert A. Heinlein

"Logic of Empire" was originally published in the March 1941 issue of Astounding Science Fiction.

"Logic of Empire" is a science fiction novella by American writer Robert A. Heinlein. Part of his Future History series, it originally appeared in Astounding Science Fiction (March 1941) and was collected in The Green Hills of Earth (and subsequently The Past Through Tomorrow).

== Plot summary ==
Two well-off Earth men are arguing about whether there is slavery on Venus, and one of them gets shanghaied there, or so he believes; they later find out that they have bet one another about the topic, gotten drunk, and signed on. Upon his arrival, he finds his contract sold to a farmer. His discovery that it will take him years to work off his debt is compounded by his realization that he cannot get to sleep at night without rhira, an expensive local narcotic, which thus increases his debt every day.

== Themes ==
Ostensibly a tale about a man in the wrong place at the wrong time and his struggle to free himself from the oppressive circumstances in which he is plunged, the story also attempts to explain how slavery develops in a new colony. Even in the future, the technology available to a new colony is always initially low. If a machine to do a necessary job is too expensive to import (say a wheat harvester, a water pump, or even a washing machine), a human must do it instead. If too many jobs must be done by hand, and there is a shortage of labor compared with independent resources that free labor could take up (exploit - "land" although that condition is not clear in the story), a market for slavery develops. Decades later, while there is still an abundance of land, this market remains because the colony itself has quotas to meet and debts to repay and cannot spare the resources to develop local industries to make the machines itself, yet free labor still then does not have to bid its price down enough to out-compete slave labor.

Throughout the story, Heinlein takes the view of the objective narrator in describing Venusian society. "Logic of Empire" places different rationales on the people who participate in slavery, only teasing a sort of socio-scientific inevitability of a slavery system. There are no real villains; everybody is just doing their job of trying to maximize income in a mercantilist system. Even the plantation owner who owns the hero is portrayed as a struggling and failing small businessman, whose main motivation is to secure a livelihood for his daughter.

== Nehemiah Scudder ==
There is in the story a casual reference to the rise of the fanatical preacher Nehemiah Scudder, who would eventually be elected president and establish a theocratic dictatorship which would rule the US for several generations. Heinlein considered writing a story focusing on his rise, which would have had the name "The Sound of His Wings" and chronologically followed directly upon "Logic of Empire." He never did so, and a great gap was left in the Future History which resumes with the overthrow of the theocracy in "If This Goes On—". As an aside, Heinlein himself said he felt that 3 books would need to be devoted to Scudder to tell the story fully and he couldn’t stand the guy enough to spend that much time with him.
