= Coventry (short story) =

1940 short story by Robert Heinlein

"Coventry" is a science fiction short story by American writer Robert A. Heinlein, part of his Future History series. It was first published in the July 1940 issue of Astounding Science Fiction, and later collected into the book Revolt in 2100 in 1953. The title is inspired by the British idiom "to send someone to Coventry". In 2017, the story won the Prometheus Hall of Fame award.

== Plot summary ==
In a future American society, everyone must accept the Covenant of non-violence, and psychologists can "cure" criminal or violent personality traits. The protagonist, David MacKinnon, is a romantic idealist who has been convicted of assault, and the court determines he is a substantial risk to commit violence in the future. He must accept treatment to remove his violent tendency, or be exiled to "Coventry", the area allocated to those who reject the Covenant or commit crimes and refuse psychological treatment, enclosed by an impassable electric field (the "Barrier").

MacKinnon chooses to emigrate to escape what he sees as the boredom of a too-civilized society. But he discovers that Coventry is not the peaceful anarchy he envisioned. It is actually a bleak dystopia split into three separate "countries":

- New America, a corrupt democracy with a dysfunctional judicial system, that lies closest to Coventry's entry point and is the most populous of the three nations.
- The ironically named Free State, an absolute dictatorship ruled by the "Liberator" with an even harsher penal system, a nation frequently at war with New America though not at the time of the story.
- The Angels, remnants of the theocracy from "If This Goes On—", in the hills north of New America, living under a new "Prophet Incarnate"—it is implied they are the least populous of the three.

On arrival in New America, MacKinnon is arrested and jailed, and loses everything he had brought with him through the Barrier. He is befriended by fellow inmate "Fader" Magee, and they break out of jail. MacKinnon learns that New America and the Free State have discovered how to breach the Barrier and are combining forces to attack the outside society. He and Fader break out of Coventry separately to warn of the imminent attack. In the outside world, MacKinnon learns that Fader is actually a government agent. Also, by risking his life for the good of the country, he has shown he is free of criminal tendencies and no longer needs therapy.

== Influence on Dianetics ==
On March 8, 1949, fellow science-fiction author L. Ron Hubbard wrote to Heinlein referencing Coventry as an influence on what would become Dianetics:

Well, you didn't specify in your book what actual reformation took place in the society to make supermen. Got to thinking about it other day. The system is Excalibur. It makes nul A's.
