= Delilah and the Space Rigger =

1949 short story by Robert Heinlein

"Delilah and the Space Rigger" is a science fiction short story by American writer Robert A. Heinlein. One of his Future History stories, it originally appeared in Blue Book in December 1949 and was reprinted in his collection, The Green Hills of Earth (and subsequently The Past Through Tomorrow).

"Delilah and the Space Rigger" is one of Heinlein's stories with a typically strong, smart, capable (for the American science fiction market of the time) female protagonist.

== Plot summary ==
Brooks McNye, a communications engineer, wangles a job as a radio technician (concealing her first name, Gloria) and joins the all-male crew of construction workers building a space station. On arrival, she is immediately confronted by "Tiny" Larsen, the hard-boiled construction superintendent, who had not realized she was female. He does not want women "sniffing around my boys" and orders her returned on the next shuttle, only to be forced by circumstances to keep her. Larsen is constantly putting his foot in his mouth with remarks like, "Mind what [Hammond] tells you. He's a good man," only to hear a brisk, "I know, I trained him." In the end, he is forced to admit that having a woman on the team has improved morale and efficiency, and he decides to stop discriminating on the basis of sex. He also asks that a chaplain be assigned to the station, reasoning, "under the new policy we may need one anytime."
