= Gentlemen, Be Seated! =

1948 short story by Robert A. Heinlein

"Gentlemen, Be Seated" is a science fiction short story by American writer Robert A. Heinlein. It was first published in the May 1948 issue of Argosy magazine. It was later included in two of Heinlein's collections, The Green Hills of Earth (1951), and The Past Through Tomorrow (1967).

== Plot summary ==
The story tells of a visit to a tunnel on the surface of the Moon which goes awry when a pressure seal fails, trapping three men (a supervisor, a reporter, and a tunnel worker). The title of the story derives from the way they plug an air leak while awaiting rescue: by sitting on it.

The phrase "Gentlemen, Be Seated!" is the opening line of the interlocutor in a traditional minstrel show. It was also, at the time the story was written and while Heinlein attended, the opening line for all classes at the military and naval academies (as well as classes for officers at the various service schools) in the United States.

The story might have been inspired by an episode in "Baron Munchausen": The ship sprung a leak. It was my good fortune to discover it first. I found it a large hole about a foot diameter. ... This noble vessel was preserved, with all its crew, by a most fortunate thought! in short, I sat down over it. ... My situation, while I sat there, was rather cool, but the carpenter's art soon relieved me.
