= It's Great to Be Back! =

Short story by Robert A. Heinlein

"It's Great to Be Back!" is a science fiction short story by American writer Robert A. Heinlein. One of his Future History stories, it was first published in The Saturday Evening Post in the July 26, 1947 issue and later reprinted in The Green Hills of Earth (and subsequently The Past Through Tomorrow).

== Plot summary ==
A physical chemist and his wife (the MacRaes), who have been in residence in Luna City on the Moon for some time, spend much of their time volubly regretting having ever left Earth. When this attitude results in social conflict with "Loonies" who love their home, the couple feels isolated, misunderstood, and put-upon. They decide to return to "dirt-side", only to discover that the Earth of their imaginations bears only the faintest of resemblances to the actuality, which includes things unheard of in Luna, like smog, unpleasant weather, the common cold, and repairmen who refuse to make house calls. Ultimately, they discover that all they really want is to go back to Luna City, where they are welcomed with open arms by their peers (now that they have realized that the Moon is "home" after all) and settle down to be happy "Lunatics".
