= Honeymoon in Hell =

1950 science fiction short story by Fredric Brown

- Author: Fredric Brown
- Cover artist: Hieronymus Bosch
- Language: English
- Genre: Science fiction
- Publisher: Bantam Books
- Publication date: August 1958
- Publication place: United States
- Media type: Print (paperback)
- Pages: 170

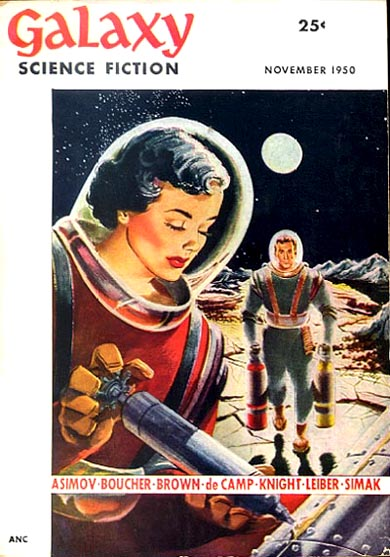
The title story, "Honeymoon in Hell", was the cover story in the second issue of Galaxy Science Fiction in 1950.

"Honeymoon in Hell" is a science fiction short story by American writer Fredric Brown, first published in 1950. It was the title story of a short story anthology published in 1958.

== Contents ==
- Honeymoon in Hell
- Too Far
- Man of Distinction
- Millennium
- The Dome
- Blood
- Hall of Mirrors
- Experiment
- The Last Martian
- Sentry
- Mouse
- Naturally
- Voodoo
- "Arena"
- Keep Out
- First Time Machine
- And the Gods Laughed
- The Weapon
- A Word from Our Sponsor
- Rustle of Wings
- Imagine

== Adaptations ==
In 1956 the short story Honeymoon in Hell was adapted for radio on NBC's X Minus One program.

In 1987, Mexican filmmaker Guillermo del Toro adapted Naturally into a short film entitled Geometria.
