= —We Also Walk Dogs =

1941 science fiction short

- Short story by Robert A. Heinlein
- Country: United States
- Language: English
- Genre: Science fiction

Publication
- Published in: Astounding Science Fiction
- Media type: Magazine
- Publication date: July 1941

"—We Also Walk Dogs" is a science fiction short story by American writer Robert A. Heinlein. One of his Future History stories, it was first published in Astounding Science Fiction (July 1941, as by Anson MacDonald) and collected in The Green Hills of Earth (and subsequently The Past Through Tomorrow).

Although considered part of the Future History, the story has no references to other stories in the canon, and features elements such as anti-gravity that are not fully consistent with other stories.

== Plot summary ==
General Services is a very successful company that provides various personal services such as shopping for you or walking your dogs or supplying a host for a party, but also proudly advertises that no job is too large. One ad campaign idea which the staff discusses is "Want somebody murdered? Then DON'T call General Services. But for anything else, call.... It Pays!". The business model involves knowing to whom to subcontract work. The technology used involves rapid access to client data and the use of personal, portable telephones.

The company is asked to do the impossible: enable an interplanetary conference to be held on Earth, whose strong gravity is inhospitable to many of the native races of other planets and moons in the solar system. The solution of holding the conference on Mars or Luna is considered politically unacceptable.

In a side plot, the team also have to deal with a rich woman who wants to visit her son recuperating from a skiing injury over a thousand miles away while simultaneously conducting a fashionable party at her home. The solution is to conduct her to her son's side while using 3-D projection to have her appear at the party. They charge a hefty fee for this. The fee is doubled when the woman selfishly tries to insist on hiring one of the team as her personal social secretary.

Much of the action of the story is not, as one might expect, about the science or engineering of creating an antigravity device to allow the conference to take place, but about how to persuade the world's leading physicist, a Dr. O'Neill, to undertake the job. O'Neill is too wealthy to be tempted by money, but longs to possess a museum piece, a Chinese porcelain bowl called "The Flower of Forgetfulness". The team have to find a way to get the bowl from its current location in a London museum. This involves the creation of a duplicate and some underhand tactics. When they receive it, they discover that it is indeed one of the most beautiful objects imaginable.

The anti-gravity generator is created, the government's conference goes well, and O'Neill is paid and receives the bowl. General Services also asserts ownership of the anti-gravity invention, against the government's attempts to claim it. O'Neill was under salaried contract at the time, with the bowl as a bonus, so by law General Services would own all the work that he did for them. O'Neill would have helped the government to grab the invention, but the team asks him for one condition: that the three of them, personally, be allowed to visit and view the bowl from time to time. Caught by surprise, he agrees and begins to regard them as potential friends.
