= "If This Goes On—" =

Science fiction novella by Robert A. Heinlein

- Author: Robert A. Heinlein
- Language: English
- Genre: Science fiction
- Published in: Astounding Science-Fiction
- Publication date: 1940
- Publication place: United States
- Media type: Periodical

"If This Goes On—" is a science fiction novella by American writer Robert A. Heinlein, first serialized in 1940 in Astounding Science-Fiction and revised and expanded to novel length for inclusion in the 1953 collection Revolt in 2100. The story shows what might happen to Christianity in the United States with mass communications, applied psychology, and a hysterical populace. The story is part of Heinlein's Future History series.

At the 2016 WorldCon the story won the 1941 Retro-Hugo Award for Best Novella of 1940.

== Plot ==
The story is set in a future theocratic American society, ruled by the latest in a series of fundamentalist Christian "Prophets." The First Prophet was Nehemiah Scudder, a backwoods preacher turned President (elected in 2012), then dictator (no elections were held in 2016 or later).

John Lyle, a junior army officer under the Prophet, is stationed at the Prophet's capital of New Jerusalem. He had been devout, but he finds himself questioning his faith when he falls for one of the Prophet's Virgins, Sister Judith. New to the vocation, Judith faints when she is called upon to submit sexually to the Prophet and is confined to her quarters until she sees the light. John confides in his far more worldly roommate, Zeb Jones, who is not shocked but even assists John. A clandestine meeting with Judith goes awry when they are forced to kill a spy. They are left with no choice but to seek aid from the Cabal, an underground revolutionary movement (Judith's friend, Sister Magdalene, is a member). The two men are inducted into the Cabal while they remain on duty in their army posts. Judith is arrested and tortured as part of the investigation into the death of the spy, and John and Zeb rescue her but leave enough clues that John is soon arrested and tortured himself. He gives little away and is himself rescued by the Cabal. Zeb and Magdalene have evaded arrest thanks to a clandestine distress signal, which John managed to leave for Zeb while he is arrested.

Judith is spirited out of the country before John regains consciousness, and John is given a false identity to make his way to Cabal headquarters. He is detected en route, forced to flee, and arrives safely after several misadventures. He finds that Zeb and Magdalene, who he assumes are a couple, have made their way there before him. All take on significant roles in bringing to fruition the revolutionary plot, John as an aide to the commander, General Huxley.

Working there, John receives a literal "Dear John" letter from Judith that informs him of her impending marriage to a Mexican man she met while she was taking refuge in his country. He learns that Zeb and Magdalene have no marriage plans, as their strong personalities would inevitably clash, and he begins a romance with Magdalene.

The revolutionary plot is mostly successful, and the country other than New Jerusalem is seized. However, the capital must also be conquered to prevent it from serving as a rallying point for loyalists. Even as constitutional discussions go on, the new regime's troops, tempered to provide the greatest possible individual freedom (that is the origin of the 'Covenant' mentioned in other Heinlein works), prepare to take New Jerusalem. John and Magdalene are married just before the assault.

During the fight, Huxley is wounded, and John must take over temporary command though he is not entitled by rank to do so. He gives the orders that bring victory. He then turns over command to the senior unwounded general and leads a squad invading the Prophet's private quarters. They find that he has been viciously killed by his own Virgins.

In the original serialized version the story is slightly different. John and Judith end up together, forming a business venture with Reeves (a minor figure that John impersonates in both versions). John is forbidden from exploring the caves, which he does in the final version. Magdalene is not mentioned after everyone escaped New Jerusalem.

== Freemasonry ==
The Cabal uses terminology associated with Freemasonry, and there are hints that the Masons are actually one of the groups involved in the loosely organized revolt against the government. (Heinlein himself was not a Mason, but he had considered joining the Masons as a young man.)

== Critical reception ==
Damon Knight in his 1967 book In Search of Wonder wrote of the novella:

Revolution... has always been a favorite theme in science fiction. It's romantic, it's reliable, and—as a rule—it's as phony as a Martian princess. Who but Heinlein ever pointed out, as he does here in detail, that a modern revolution is big business? And who but Heinlein would have seen that fraternal organizations, for thirty years the butt of highbrow American humor, would make the perfect nucleus for an American underground against tyranny?

A reviewer for The Economist in 2024 called the novel "a peculiar mixture of pulpy action and political theorising". He noted that the novel version included extensive postscript by the author explaining his concerns. He quoted Heinlein's words from it:

There is a latent deep strain of religious fanaticism in [America]; it is rooted in our history and it has broken out many times in the past...[T]here has been a sharp rise in strongly evangelical sects in this country in recent years, some of which hold beliefs theocratic in the extreme, anti-intellectual, anti-scientific, and anti-libertarian...The capacity of the human mind for swallowing nonsense and spewing it forth in violent and repressive action has never yet been plumbed.

In academia, the story has been analyzed as an early critique (in science fiction) of "religion as a manipulative, hegemonic social tool", and argued to be an example of a feminist critique of religion. It has also been mentioned as one of the first portrayals of fictional religion in science fiction.

== Connections with other works by Heinlein ==
Set in Heinlein's Future History, the story is self-contained and describes the end of a theocratic government that had been established in 2012. This government had been democratically elected but was quickly subverted by the elected president (and the first of the Prophets) Nehemiah Scudder. The context of this election was the societal disruptions brought about by the establishment of the "new imperialism", described in The Man Who Sold the Moon, this imperialism being brought about by the development of practical interplanetary travel. This leads to, as described in Logic of Empire, subsistence level wages at home and slavery in the colonies (the subject of Logic of Empire, where "colonists" on Venus are for all intents and purposes slaves). Because of the economic dislocations brought about by this imperialism, revolutions occurred in and around 2012, in the United States, Venus and Little America and brought the end to interplanetary travel (the Interregnum). Incidentally, interplanetary travel was implicitly assumed by Heinlein to be a solely American provenance (note Heinlein assumes that Europe is destroyed in the future, first by "the final blackout" and then (in ""Time Enough For Love"" by Great China). Heinlein is writing a "future history", and If This Goes On-- is towards the end of this history, the finale being the novellas Methuselah's Children (published in two parts). Methuselah's Children describes a time approximately fifty years after the overthrow of the theocratic government and depicts a society founded on the principles of "semantics" (Heinlein states in various places that the Prophets would never have taken power if a science of such has been established before 2012). If This Goes On-- also describes briefly what the future government of the United States would look like (the Covenant, a somewhat-idealized basis for government depicted in "Coventry", "Misfit", and Methuselah's Children). Note, of course, in Methuselah's Children, the principles of this Utopian government are quickly cast aside and the torture methods used by the Prophets are authorized against a sub-group of long-lived humans (the Howards, eponymously named after the foundation which funded selective breeding for longevity in humans).

Scudder was previously mentioned in passing in the short story "Logic of Empire" and would be again later on in Heinlein's final novel, To Sail Beyond the Sunset. A story about the rise of Scudder, "The Sound of His Wings", is contained in the Future History timeline but was never written by Heinlein, who stated in the afterword to Revolt in 2100: "I will probably never write the story of Nehemiah Scudder, I dislike him too much." Also, a story called "The Stone Pillow", which would have depicted the earlier foredoomed opposition to the Theocracy, never got written; Heinlein noted that there was "too much tragedy in real life".

The 1940 version of "If This Goes On—" was believed to be Heinlein's first novel until the unpublished work For Us, the Living: A Comedy of Customs was discovered in 2003. The earlier unpublished novel also features a Nehemiah Scudder who comes very close to gaining power but is stopped at the last moment by the mobilization of Libertarians.

Ward Carson wrote: "In For Us, the Living, space colonization waits until the end of the twenty-first century and Scudder is defeated; in the Future History it happens a century earlier and Scudder takes over the US. Heinlein made no explicit remark on this, but a causal connection could be made: in the Future History the bold individualistic Americans emigrated into space in the end of the twentieth century, and were not present in America to stop it from falling into the fanatic's hands."
