= The Long Watch =

1949 short story by Robert Heinlein

- Short story by Robert A. Heinlein
- Country: United States
- Language: English
- Genre: Science fiction

Publication
- Published in: American Legion Magazine
- Publication date: December 1949

"The Long Watch" is a science fiction short story by American writer Robert A. Heinlein. It is about a military officer who faces a coup d'état by a would-be dictator.

Originally titled "Rebellion on the Moon", the story originally appeared in an edited version in the December 1949 American Legion Magazine. It also featured in April 1955 Nebula Science Fiction Number 12, illustrated by John J. Greengrass. It appears in Heinlein's short story collections The Green Hills of Earth and The Past Through Tomorrow. While it is included in collections of Future History stories and appears on Heinlein's timeline chart, "The Long Watch" does not appear to share continuity with the history, but with Space Cadet published a year earlier.

== Plot summary ==
In 1999, Lieutenant John Ezra Dahlquist is a member of the Space Patrol, an international organization with the custody of all Earth's remaining nuclear weapons. A young bomb officer and physicist at the Patrol's lunar base, he is apolitical and is devoted to his wife and young daughter. The base's executive officer Colonel Towers asks to meet with him. Towers and others want to overthrow the Earth government and plan to use the bombs to destroy "an unimportant town or two" so Earth takes them seriously. Dahlquist leads Towers to believe that he will cooperate, but he does not want his family to live under a dictatorship and plans to stop the coup by preventing the bombs' use.

Dahlquist locks himself in the bomb bunker, modifies a bomb to detonate by hand, and threatens to blow up himself and the bombs. He negotiates with Towers, pretending to be still naïve; he hopes to give the government time to stop the coup. Dahlquist is growing tired, however, and if he falls asleep the conspirators may regain control. He decides to disable the bombs beyond the plotters' ability to repair them, despite the danger. The only way to do so is to open them up and break the plutonium core of each bomb. Dahlquist does so, but in the process exposes himself to a fatal dose of radiation. He dies "very happy".

The coup collapses and Towers shoots himself. The Patrol recovers Dahlquist's radioactive body and places it in a lead coffin. As Earth mourns the hero, his body is entombed in a marble monument, with an honor guard beyond the limit of safe approach.

== Connection with other Heinlein stories ==
In Space Cadet, Ezra Dahlquist is one of "[t]hose who helped create the Tradition of the Patrol". New recruits view a display about his heroism, "the day shameful and glorious in the history of the Patrol". At every Patrol roll call, his name is called with those of three other Patrol heroes. A skeptical candidate to become a Patrol cadet comments that Dahlquist disobeyed his commanding officer in performing the acts he is commended for, and that if things had gone the other way, Dahlquist would have been deemed a traitor. However, a patrol regulation read from the handbook by Cadet Matt Dodson reads: "—but the responsibility of determining the legality of the order rests on the person ordered as well as on the person giving the order", suggesting that he was within regulations to do so.

As the protagonist dies at the end, he sees, standing around him, a number of heroes who sacrificed themselves for others in history, including Rodger Young, a soldier who died in World War II helping his unit retreat and was posthumously awarded the Medal of Honor in 1944. Heinlein also referred to Young's heroism in Starship Troopers, in which the protagonist's starship was named after Young, and the recall used to bring the soldiers home was "The Ballad of Rodger Young".

== Comparison with actual history ==
The story assumed that placing nuclear missiles on the Moon would be an acceptable act in international relations by 1999, and that such a nuclear base would in effect have Earth at its mercy - leading to the potential of this power being abused, as it very nearly is in the story. This was an entirely plausible possibility at the time of writing.

In actual history, the possibility for such positioning of nuclear weapons on the Moon was averted, before the actual Moon landing in 1969, through the Outer Space Treaty, providing that

- States shall not place nuclear weapons or other weapons of mass destruction in orbit or on celestial bodies or station them in outer space in any other manner; and that
- the Moon and other celestial bodies shall be used exclusively for peaceful purposes.

With the United States, the United Kingdom and the Soviet Union signing the treaty in 1967 and most other nations joining in later, there are not known to be any space-based nuclear weapons such as Heinlein envisioned.
