= The Green Hills of Earth =

1947 short story by Robert A. Heinlein

- Short story by Robert A. Heinlein
- Country: USA
- Genre: science fiction

Publication
- Published in: The Saturday Evening Post
- Publication date: February 8, 1947

"The Green Hills of Earth" is a science fiction short story by American writer Robert A. Heinlein. One of his Future History stories, the short story originally appeared in The Saturday Evening Post (February 8, 1947), and it was collected in The Green Hills of Earth (and subsequently in The Past Through Tomorrow). Heinlein selected the story for inclusion in the 1949 anthology My Best Science Fiction Story. "The Green Hills of Earth" is also the title of a song mentioned in several of Heinlein's novels.

The Rhysling Award for speculative fiction poetry awarded by the Science Fiction Poetry Association (SFPA) is named for the blind poet Rhysling in “The Green Hills of Earth.”

Rhysling (crater) on the Moon was named by Apollo 15 astronauts. who quoted the last verse of Rhysling's song "The green hills of Earth" (from this story) as their third moonwalk was ending.

== Plot summary ==
It is the story of "Noisy" Rhysling, the blind space-going songwriter whose poetic skills rival Rudyard Kipling's. Heinlein (himself a medically retired U.S. naval officer) spins a yarn about a radiation-blinded, unemployable spaceship engineer crisscrossing the Solar System writing and singing songs. The story takes the form of a nonfiction magazine article.

The events of the story concern the composition of the titular song. Rhysling realizes that his death of old age is near, and hitchhikes on a spaceship headed to Earth so he can die and be buried where he was born. A malfunction threatens the ship with destruction, and Rhysling enters the irradiated area to perform repairs. While completing the repairs, he knows that he will soon die of radiation poisoning and tells them to record his last song; he dies just moments after singing the final, titular verse.

== Apollo 15 ==
The Apollo 15 astronauts named a number of craters in their landing area after favorite science fiction stories. Near "Dune" (after the Frank Herbert novel) and "Earthlight" (Arthur C. Clarke) craters was Rhysling (crater), named after the blind singer of the spaceways in "The Green Hills of Earth". They intended to read a bit of "Green Hills of Earth" at the crater, but the exigencies of lunar exploration kept it from happening. To squeeze it in, Capcom Joe Allen told them to "come home again to the homes of men, to the cool green hills of Earth" as their last moonwalk was ending:

Allen: As the space poet Rhysling (the blind poet in Robert Heinlein's The Green Hills of Earth) would say, we're ready for you to "come back again to the homes of men on the cool green hills of Earth."

[Scott - "That's from the Green Hills of Earth. That's one we talked about before the flight. Have you read that one?"] [Jones - "Oh, yeah! That was a favorite when I was a kid. Had you read it?"]

[Scott - "Sure. (Quoting from memory):

We pray for one last landing
on the globe that gave us birth
To rest our eyes on fleecy skies
and the cool green hills of Earth.
"]

[Scott - "In thinking about perception kind of stuff, if you think about where we are (at Hadley), the thing that's really different about the Earth is 'cool green hills' with the fleecy skies and the blue sky. So Heinlein's perception of a meaningful thing for the Blind Poet of the Spaceways is pretty good. That he could transport himself out."]

[Jones - "It was written sometime in the 40s, I think."]

[Scott - "And here we have black skies, and a gray surface. Dramatic difference. I always think it's amazing. Some of those science fiction guys can really project themselves out there that way."]

[Jones - "The good ones could."]

[Scott - "Cause one of the questions people ask about this is, 'Is the sky really all black?' Yeah. 'When it was daylight?' Yup. 'Wow!'"]

— Apollo 15 Lunar Surface Journal "The Hammer and the Feather"

Scott's memory of this last verse does not match either of the versions in the story itself, which is fitting considering that "most of the verses were collected after [Rhysling's] death from people who knew him" and "The Green Hills of Earth grew through twenty years".

== The songs ==
Heinlein wrote several fragments of lyrics and six full stanzas for the song.

- — We rot in the molds of Venus, / We retch at her tainted breath. / Foul are her flooded jungles, / Crawling with unclean death. —
- — harsh bright soil of Luna —
- — The arching sky is calling / Spacemen back to their trade. / All hands! Stand by! Free falling! / And the lights below us fade. / Out ride the sons of Terra, / Far drives the thundering jet, / Up leaps the race of Earthmen / Out, far, and onward yet —
- — Saturn's rainbow rings —
- — the frozen night of Titan —
- We pray for one last landing/ On the globe that gave us birth/ Let us rest our eyes on the fleecy skies/ And the cool, green hills of Earth.

Moore and Kuttner also give fragments of lyrics in "Quest of the Starstone."

- - Across the seas of darkness / The good green Earth is bright – / Oh, Star that was my homeland / Shine down on me tonight.-
- - My heart turns home in longing/ Across the voids between, / To know beyond the spaceways/ The hills of Earth are green. –
- - - and count the losses worth / To see across the darkness/ The green hills of Earth...

The story features several other partial songs and a number of titles attributed to Rhysling. These are:

- The Grand Canal (10 lines)
- Jet Song (14 lines, unclear if meant to be complete)
- The Skipper is a Father to His Crew (title only)
- Since the Pusher Met My Cousin (title only)
- That Red-Headed Venusburg Gal (title only)
- Keep Your Pants On, Skipper (title only)
- A Space Suit Built for Two (title only)
- Dark Star Passing (title only)
- Berenice's Hair (title only)
- Death Song of a Woods Colt (title only)

Several are described as sexually explicit songs excluded from the official edition of Rhysling's works.

Four collections of Rhysling's works are mentioned. They are:

- Songs of the Spaceways (published the week he died)
- The Grand Canal, and other Poems
- High and Far
- UP SHIP!

== References in other Heinlein works ==
Joe-Jim Gregory, the two-headed mutant in Universe, are both fond of "Rhysling, the blind singer of the spaceways". This reference to the character appeared six years before Heinlein actually published "The Green Hills of Earth".

The song "The Green Hills of Earth" is mentioned three times in Farmer in the Sky as a piece that Bill Lermer plays on his own accordion. Later in that same novel, Lermer is trying to identify a quote ("I have lived and worked with men") and guesses that it was written by Rhysling or Kipling.

Both the song "The Green Hills of Earth" and the character of Rhysling are mentioned in the novel Time Enough for Love. At an early point in the novel, Lazarus Long bemoans the fact that he cannot "pray for one last landing" because the "Green Hills of Earth" have deteriorated and the planet is uninhabitable. Later, Lazarus tells the story of a blind accordion player who temporarily took residence in a bordello that he owned on Mars almost two thousand years ago. Although Heinlein readers can easily recognize the character, Lazarus himself does not "recall his right name, if he had one."

"Since the Pusher Met My Cousin" and "That Red-Headed Venusburg Gal" are both referred to, but no lyrics are provided, in Heinlein's "Logic of Empire".

In Stranger in a Strange Land, writer Jubal Harshaw dictates a poem also named Death Song of a Wood's Colt.

=== Similarity to other works ===
In 1935 Ernest Hemingway published "Green Hills of Africa". There is, however, no clear evidence of Heinlein being influenced by this title.

== Film, TV, radio/audio and theatrical adaptations ==
The story was adapted for the Dimension X radio series (episode 10). It also appeared on the July 7, 1955, broadcast of the NBC Radio Network program X Minus One. Both versions are told from the point of view of a friend of Rhysling's, and have Rhysling using a guitar instead of an accordion. As well as part of the title song (including the origin of a stanza about Venus) using the tune "Rosin the Bow", two verses of "The Captain is a Father to His Crew" are sung, plus choral verses of "Jet Song", and a complete and particularly beautiful version of "The Grand Canal". The songs were composed and sung by Tom Glazer in a manner akin to Woody Guthrie; Kenneth Williams played Rhysling as a backwoodsman from the Ozarks, an area not far from Heinlein's Missouri birthplace. The broadcast is available on the Old-Time Radio Classical Favorites release in the Smithsonian Institution's Radio Spirits series.

Another adaptation aired on the CBS Radio Workshop on July 21, 1957. The script was by Draper Lewis and Robert Heinlein, produced and directed by Dee Engelbach, with music by Clark Harrington. Everett Sloane played Rhysling, Berry Kroeger narrated, and other cast members included Jackson Beck, Danny Ocko, Ian Martin, Louis Volkman, and Bill Lipton.

The song "The Green Hills of Earth" which appears in the story was also used in the 11th episode of the third series of the British radio series, Journey into Space.

The 1951 – 1952 television series Out There (episode aired December 2, 1951) had a loosely adapted version of the story (Rhysling is on a mission to the asteroids with a crew which includes a beautiful blonde biologist) which starred singer John Raitt.

In 1977, Leonard Nimoy recorded a dramatic reading of the story as the title track of an album for Caedmon Records. Nimoy narrated the song lyric excerpts as originally written by Heinlein without singing them.

The story "The Green Hills of Earth" was read at Symphony Space by Kathleen Chalfant on 6/8/2001 and broadcast on the radio program Selected Shorts.

== Other references ==
In his 2005 book Learning the World, Ken MacLeod pays homage to this song: Chapter 17 ("Fire in the Sky") ends with a scene where a spacecraft evades an attack. The chapter ends with the background intercom blaring:

'"All Hands! Stand by! Free Falling!"'
'And the lights below us fade.'

Anthony Boucher, who was a close friend of Heinlein's in the 1930s in Los Angeles, in his short story "Man's Reach" makes reference to Rhysling's "Jet Song", stating, "The familiar words boomed forth with that loving vigor of all baritones who have never seen deep space":

'"Feel her rise! Feel her drive!"'
'Straining steel, come alive...'

In Randall Garrett's short story The Man Who Hated Mars, the song plays in the Recreation Building of the penal colony on Mars, reminding all of what they've left.

In "Islands in the Sky" (Season 1, Episode 3, 1965) of Lost in Space, Dr. Smith says he wishes to return to the "green hills of earth."

== Notes ==
Isaac Asimov recalled in 1969 "I'll never forget the shock that rumbled through the entire world of science fiction fandom when ... Heinlein broke the 'slicks' barrier by having an undiluted science fiction story of his published in The Saturday Evening Post".

Heinlein credited the title of the song, "The Green Hills of Earth", to the short story "Shambleau" by C. L. Moore (first published in 1933), in which a spacefaring smuggler named Northwest Smith hums the tune. In another of C.L. Moore's Northwest Smith stories named "The Cold Gray God", published in 1935, the song is mentioned as a solar-wide hit by a singer named Rose Robertson. Moore and Henry Kuttner also have Northwest Smith hum the song in their 1937 short story "Quest of the Starstone," which quotes several lines of lyrics.

Heinlein revealed in the liner notes to the Leonard Nimoy album The Green Hills of Earth that he partially based Rhysling's unique abilities on a blind machinist he worked with at the Philadelphia Naval Yards during World War II. He never identified him beyond the name "Tony." Heinlein was amazed that Tony had a perfect safety record and a production record equal to sighted machinists and could identify all his co-workers solely by the sound of their footsteps and other aural clues, without need of them speaking to him first. Tony also occasionally played the accordion and sang for the assembled shop. William H. Patterson, in his Heinlein biography Robert A. Heinlein: In Dialogue with His Century, Vol. 1 - Learning Curve (1907-1948), identified the blind machinist as Tony Damico.
