= Searchlight (short story) =

1962 short science fiction story by Robert A. Heinlein

"Searchlight" is a very short science fiction story by American writer Robert A. Heinlein, about a little blind girl whose spaceship crashes on the Moon. The search for her takes advantage of her prodigious musical ability to locate her.

It was originally written in 1962 as part of an advertisement for Hoffman Electronics. Heinlein says that it was "a tour de force; required: to tell a story in 1200 words which legitimately involved electronics". Perhaps because of this, along with the relatively lower profits, it was the last short story Heinlein wrote; the remaining quarter-century of his career was devoted to writing novels and non-fiction essays.

"Searchlight" was first published in August 1962 in Scientific American and in September 1962 in Fortune. It is anthologized in The Worlds of Robert A. Heinlein, a collection of short stories published in 1966; The Past Through Tomorrow, a collection of short stories published in 1967; and his Expanded Universe in 1980.

== Note ==
In the Expanded Universe collection, Heinlein suggests that the story may have been inspired by a real-life incident in 1931. A group of fighter planes got lost during a war game and could not find their carrier. In those days before radar, Heinlein was manning the carrier's radio compass, but its limitations could not locate the squadron. Fortunately, the planes saw the fleet's suddenly lit searchlights, and they landed just in time.
