= Space Jockey =

- Short story by Robert A. Heinlein
- Country: United States
- Language: English
- Genre: Science fiction

Publication
- Published in: The Saturday Evening Post
- Media type: Magazine
- Publication date: April 26, 1947

"Space Jockey" is a science fiction short story by American writer Robert A. Heinlein. Part of his Future History series, it originally appeared in The Saturday Evening Post, April 26, 1947, and was collected in The Green Hills of Earth (and subsequently The Past Through Tomorrow).

The story is set in the near future. It realistically depicts a day in the life of a rocket pilot who pilots commercial passenger spacecraft on scheduled runs between the Earth and the Moon. It shows the pilot dealing with problems such as an unruly child of a VIP visiting his control room, recalculating the trajectory when the spoiled brat sends the rocket off course, facing a choice between jettisoning cargo and not having enough fuel to reach the destination, and coping with the demands of superiors.

The story begins with a contentious scene between the pilot and his wife, who is unhappy about his irregular schedule and wants him to take a ground job. Interspersed between the exciting events on the spacecraft, the pilot writes and rewrites a letter to his wife, in the process trying to decide whether he should abandon the job to which he is so well suited. The story ends on the Moon, where the pilot is offered a more lucrative position, with the condition that he relocate to Luna City. He calls his wife and is relieved when she agrees.
