= Ordeal in Space =

1948 short story by Robert A. Heinlein

"Ordeal in Space" is a science fiction short story by American writer Robert A. Heinlein, originally published in Town & Country, May 1948. It is one of Heinlein's Future History stories, and appears in his collection The Green Hills of Earth.

== Plot summary ==
A spaceship's crewman is called on to repair an external antenna while his ship is still under rotation. He is unable to hold on, despite supreme effort; he falls away from the ship and has far too much time to ponder things. When he returns to Earth, he is unable to work as a spaceman for he has fear of heights. After living in fear and sadness for a time, he must face his troubles while rescuing a kitten stuck on the 35th-floor ledge of a building.

Heinlein includes a variant verse to the hymn Eternal Father, Strong to Save, dedicated "to those who venture into space," in the story. Originally titled "Broken Wings", the story was rejected by The Saturday Evening Post. A reading of this story was broadcast on BBC Radio 7 on July 14, 2007.
