= Imaginary voyage =

Fictitious narrative written as a travel account

Imaginary voyage is a narrative genre which presents fictitious locations in the form of a travel narrative, but has no generally agreed-upon definition. It has been subdivided into fantastic voyages and realistic voyages depending on the prominence of "marvelous or supernatural elements". It can be a utopian or satirical representation put into a fictional frame of travel account. It has been regarded as a predecessor of science fiction.

== Types ==
Goeffroy Atkinson suggested as a more detailed subdivision of imaginary voyages published up to 1720:

- Fantastic or Marvellous: characterized by recognizably supernatural elements
- Extraordinary: believable travel accounts distinguished by "geographic realism", but outside "familiar European countries"
- Extra-terrestrial
- Satirical or Allegorical: clearly recognizable depictions of concepts rather than foreign geographies
- Subterranean

Sources including later developments of the genre added as types:

- "Time travel stories"
- "Microcosmic romances"
- Space opera

Elements of the imaginary voyage can also appear in the picaresque novel. In Grimmelshausen’s Simplicius Simplicissimus (1668), for example, the eponymous hero travels to the centre of the earth and is later stranded on a desert island, both of which are hallmarks of the genre.

== History ==
=== Classical origins ===
The imaginary voyage is a very archaic narrative technique preceding romance and novelistic forms. Two known examples from Greek literature are Euhemerus' Sacred History and Iambulus’ Islands of the Sun. Their utopian islands are apparently modeled from mythological Fortunate Isles.

Lucian's True History parodizes the genre, and in his foreword Lucian mentions Iambulus as one of targets of parody. He also foregrounds his work as being a deliberate fabrication: "I will say one thing that is true, and that is that I am a liar". Photius states though in his Bibliotheca that its main object was Antonius Diogenes' The Incredible Wonders Beyond Thule, a genre blending of fantastic voyage and Greek romance which popularized Pythagorean teachings.

=== Development ===
Exotic travel writing appeared in the form of wonder books in the medieval West in the 13th century, fantastic tales of imaginary voyages presented as real autobiographical accounts. The Travels of Sir John Mandeville (c. 1357) and the Itinerarius of Johannes Witte de Hese (c. 1390) are important representatives of this late medieval tendency.

The first to revive this form in the Modern era was Thomas More in his Utopia (1515), to be followed a century later by proliferation of utopian islands: Johannes Valentinus Andreae's Reipublicae Christianopolitanae descriptio (1619), Tommaso Campanella's The City of the Sun (1623), Francis Bacon's New Atlantis (1627), Jacob Bidermann's Utopia (1640), Gabriel Daniel's Voyage du monde de Descartes (1690), François Lefebvre's Relation du voyage de l’isle d’Eutopie (1711), as well as many others. Denis Vairasse' The history of the Sevarambi (1675) and Gabriel de Foigny's La Terre australe connue (1676), which describe voyages to utopian civilisations in Australia, both received popular translations into English.

Lucian's satirical line was exploited by François Rabelais' Gargantua and Pantagruel (1532) and developed later on in Joseph Hall's Mundus Alter et Idem (1607), François Hédelin's Histoire du temps (1654), Cyrano de Bergerac's Histoire comique contenant les États et Empires de la Lune (1657) and Fragments d’histoire comique contenant les États et Empires du Soleil (1662), Charles Sorel's Nouvelle Découverte du Royaume de Frisquemore (1662), Margaret Cavendish's The Blazing World (1666), Joshua Barnes' Gerania (1675), Bernard de Fontenelle's Relation de l’île de Bornéo (1686), Daniel Defoe's The Consolidator (1705), and most notably in Jonathan Swift's Gulliver's Travels (1726).

While the narratives themselves were romanticised, there was a desire amongst the reading public for real details of the places visited, which the authors would typically derive from works published by real-life explorers. In Francois Rabelais’ Gargantua and Pantagruel, for example, details about a voyage to the New World were derived from the explorer Jacques Cartier, while The Travels of John Mandeville borrows details from Odoric of Pordenone and William of Boldensele.

=== Eighteenth century ===
The eighteenth century saw the genre come into particular literary prominence. Written during the major period of imperial expansion and typically set in unexplored regions of the world such as Australasia and the Pacific, these works allowed readers to engage in fantasies of colonisation. The primary cultural exponents of the imaginary voyages during this period were Swift's Gulliver's Travels and Daniel Defoe's Robinson Crusoe (1719), both of which were imitated by other authors. One such imitator, Roger Paltock's The Life and Adventures of Peter Wilkins (1750), incorporates the latter's scientific realism with the former's fantastical setting. In Gulliver’s Travels, the kingdoms visited are distorted but recognisable versions of European societies; "the colonial voyage into alien culture actually serves to revalue one’s own". Other journeys to utopian civilisations from this period include Captain Samuel Brunt's A Voyage to Cacklogallinia (1727) and Simon Berington’s The Memoirs of Signor Gaudentio di Lucca (1737) Simon Tyssot de Patot's The Travels and Adventures of James Massey (1720), which sees the eponymous protagonist shipwrecked on the pacifistic utopia of Austral Land, is considered one of the sources of Gulliver's Travels.

The growing curiosity in exploration during this period led to many publishers printing anonymously-written accounts of voyages deliberately styled to appear as realistic as possible. By presenting the information as potentially factual it was of greater interest to the reading public than other forms of fiction. A 1750 article in the London-based periodical The Monthly Review commented that "voyage accounts are generally looked upon as truth [as they have] a much stronger claim to the reader's attention, than the most striking incidents in a novel or romance." Early critical attention to the imaginary voyage genre primarily involved trying to distinguish whether these accounts were genuine or fabricated. In 1787, Charles Garnier created a thirty-six volume collection of these imaginary voyages entitled Voyages imaginaires, songes, visions et romans cabalistiques in which he attempted to distinguish between the "possible" and "impossible" journeys.

Imaginary voyage has become a natural medium for promoting new astronomic ideas. First literary space flights after Lucian were: Juan Maldonado's Somnium (1541), Johann Kepler's Somnium (1634), Francis Godwin's The Man in the Moone (1638), John Wilkins' The Discovery of a World in the Moone (1638), Athanasius Kircher's Itinerarium extaticum (1656), David Russen's Iter lunare (1703), Diego de Torres Villarroel's Viaje fantástico (1723), Eberhard Christian Kindermann's Die geschwinde Reise auf dem Luftschiff nach der obern Welt (1744) – the first flight to planets, Robert Paltock's The life and adventures of Peter Wilkins (1751), Voltaire's Micromégas (1752). This form of the moon voyage narrative typically uses the introduction of ‘the man of the moon’ to comment on the political reality of the author. For example, in Daniel Defoe’s The Consolidator (1705), the flying machine serves as a metaphor for parliament, while in Captain Samuel Brunt's A Voyage to Cacklogallinia (1727) the narrator searches for gold on the moon in an extended reference to the contemporary South Sea Bubble financial crash.

=== Nineteenth century and beyond ===
The works of Jules Verne represented a growing interest in the mechanics of the voyage, rather than the destination. In Twenty Thousand Leagues Under the Seas (1870), the dimensions and means of travel of the submarine the Nautilus are described, while similar calculations are referred to in Five Weeks in a Balloon (1863) and From the Earth to the Moon (1865).

Major works of Victorian fantasy such as H. Rider Haggard's She: A History of Adventure (1886) and William Morris' The Well at the World's End can be viewed within the genre of the Imaginary Voyage. Twentieth century inheritors include L. Frank Baum's The Wonderful Wizard of Oz (1900), David Lindsay's A Voyage to Arcturus (1920), Norton Juster's The Phantom Tollbooth (1961) and Angela Carter's The Infernal Desire Machines of Doctor Hoffman (1972).

== See also ==
- Baron Munchausen
- Accidental travel
- Portal fantasy
