= Industrial Party =

Industrial Party may refer to:

- Prompartiya ("Industrial Party"), an allegedly anti-Soviet organization during the Industrial Party Affair.
- Industrial Party (China), a term refers to a group of Chinese thinkers and Chinese people who support scientific thinking, advanced technology, techno-nationalism and economic growth, and reject liberalism, universal values and free market economics. Also a fan culture.

== See also ==
- Technocracy movement
