= Engineers' trial =

Engineers' trial may refer to:

- Shakhty Trial
- Industrial Party Trial
