= Lydia Fotiyeva =

Russian revolutionary and Vladimir Lenin's personal secretary

- Ли́дия Алекса́ндровна Фо́тиева
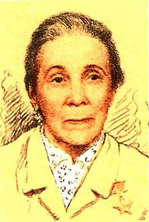
- Image of Fotiyeva in a Soviet commemorative envelope from 1981
- Born: 18 October 1881; Ryazan, Russian Empire
- Died: 23 August 1975 (aged 93); Moscow, Russian SFSR, Soviet Union
- Burial place: Novodevichy Cemetery, Moscow
- Known for: Personal secretary of V.I. Lenin
- Political party: Communist Party of the Soviet Union
- Awards: Order of Lenin; Hero of Socialist Labour; Order of the Red Banner of Labour

Lydia Alexandrovna Fotiyeva (Russian: Ли́дия Алекса́ндровна Фо́тиева; 18 October 1881 – 25 August 1975) was a Russian Bolshevik revolutionary and personal secretary of Vladimir Lenin.

== Biography ==
Lydia Fotiyeva was born on 18 October 1881 in Ryazan, then in the Russian Empire. She began studying at the Moscow Conservatory in 1899 but transferred to the Bestuzhev Courses women's education institution in 1900. However, she could not finish her studies because, in 1901, she was expelled and exiled to the city of Perm for her participation in the youth movement there. In 1904, she became a member of the Communist Party of the Soviet Union and active in the Bolshevik revolutionary movement, and was arrested multiple times because of this. In the following years, she aided Nadezhda Krupskaya in her communication with party officials in Russia from abroad and additionally undertook other work for the party in St. Petersburg, Geneva, and Paris. In 1917, she worked for Vyacheslav Molotov in the office of the Pravda newspaper and obtained a degree from the Moscow Conservatory. Between 1918 and 1924, Fotiyeva worked as Lenin's personal secretary. Beginning in 1933, she worked at the All-Russian Thermal Engineering Institute. During World War II, Fotiyeva worked for the International Red Aid organisation. In 1956, she retired and began receiving a personal pension.

She was subject to persecution during the reign of Joseph Stalin, as many of the Old Bolsheviks were. Lenin originally dictated his Testament to her while she was his secretary.

Fotiyeva died in Moscow on 25 August 1975 at the age of 93. She was buried at the Novodevichy Cemetery in Moscow. Her obituary was signed by General Secretary Leonid Brezhnev and other Soviet officials.

== Legacy ==
Fotiyeva was described by TASS as a "true daughter of Communism who devoted her whole life to the service of her motherland." A street in Moscow was named after her and a memorial plaque was installed on her former home.

== Honours and awards ==
- Order of Lenin (4-time recipient)
- Hero of Socialist Labour
- Order of the Red Banner of Labour

== See also ==
- Women in the Russian Revolution
