= Onirism (video game) =

- Developer: Crimson Tales
- Publisher: Shoreline Games
- Platform: Windows
- Release: October 23, 2025
- Genres: 3D platformer, Third-person shooter
- Mode: Single-player

Onirism is a 2025 platformer and third-person shooter video game developed by Crimson Tales and published by Shoreline Games. Originally available in early access since 2019, the game was released on October 23, 2025.

== Gameplay ==
Onirism stars Carol (voiced by AleXa), a girl in pursuit of her stuffed bunny who gets stolen by a monster. She accesses a dimension called Crearia by going through a portal that the monster created. Throughout the game, weapons and gadgets can be acquired and used to fight enemies or help traversal. Various vehicles can also be mounted, including mechs, airplanes and Hovercraft. Carol's outfit can be customized with unlockable outfits. The game features 20 levels with different collectibles and a boss at the end. Multiplayer is also available, with cooperative and versus modes being playable both locally and online

== Development ==
Onirism originally became available as an early access title on Steam in 2019. It was set to release on September 25, 2025, but was delayed to October out of fear of being overshadowed by Hades II.

== Reception ==
AltChar rated the game 68 out of 100, praising Onirism's combat, world design and customiation, but calling the platforming "awkward" and the graphical fidelity "dated". Rice Digital complimented the game's movement and amount of content, comparing the game to Serious Sam, while criticizing the performance and bugs, stating that "more polish [is] needed before [the game] can be considered truly complete." Game8 gave the game 74 out of 100, praising the gameplay variety and replay value, while criticizing the checkpoint system as well as bugs.
