= Islands of the Sun =

Greek utopian novel

- Author: Iambulus
- Language: Ancient Greek
- Genre: Utopian fiction
- Published: 3rd or 2nd century BCE
- Publication place: Ancient Greece
- Media type: Manuscript

Islands of the Sun or The Adventures of Iambulus in the Southern Ocean is a utopian novel by Iambulus which was written in Greek between 165 and 50 BCE. It chronicles the journey of the eponymous character Iambulus who discovers a seemingly perfect island nation. This book comprises eight chapters which describe the island's geography and its inhabitants’ culture.

The character Iambulus was captured on his way through Arabia. Heeding orders from his Ethiopian captors, he journeys to a distant island where he meets the natives who would share their prosperity with the Ethiopians for six hundred years. The islands are part of an archipelago where the days and nights are equal length and the weather is temperate. The natives eat animals and plants; all of which are plentiful. They live in a society with communistic features and value restraint, beauty, and knowledge. Iambulus stays for seven years then returns to Greece.

== Background ==
This presented first-person narrative describing a voyage to the Islands of the Sun, which forms part of an archipelago of seven islands equidistant to one another, all observed to be run under the same set of rules and laws, is a story which is said to have been originally authored by an ancient Greek merchant named Iambulus.

This story has been estimated to have been written in the third or second century BCE. The aim of Iambulus' work, and in other words, the interest of his works was seen to heavily focus upon the evaluation and analysis of ethical, financial, and social structures of society. In his writing process, it has even been noted that Iambulus utilized geographical astronomical, botanical, zoological, and even anthropologic data available to him at the time of the writing of his works in order to substantiate the validity of his pieces. Additionally, Iambulus' literary approach has been demonstrated to reflect previous scientific-narration type pieces, such as the voyage narrative, "The Voyage of Nearchus", and "The Periplus of the Erythrean Sea", which at the time exemplified the style of work which Iambulus would go on to emulate in his writings, which namely was that of more defined literature with significant incorporation of scientific information in the storyline.

Furthermore, Iambulus' narrative specifically within Islands of the Sun is observed to still fall within parameters classic of Greek literary utopia. Typically, the literary genre of Greek storytelling is presented in a pointed, sharply defined manner (especially with respect to futuristic/utopian thematics). Most prominently, Iambulus is seen to conduct his writings within this genre via his implementation of utopian aesthetics (physical, architectural), human perfectionism (diseaseless, long-living societies), and style of travel-narrative within the story presented in/by Islands of the Sun.

== Summary ==
The following are the eight chapters in Iambulus' narrative Island of the Sun: Birth and Education of Iambulus, Incidents Leading to his Discovery of the Islands of the sun, Geographical and Astronomical Description of the Islands, Constitution and Customs of the Islanders, Religion of the Islanders, Language and Learning of the Islanders, The animals of the Islands, Sojourn of Iambulus as Palibotha and his Return to Greece or Asia Minor.

The first and second chapters talked about Iambulus' journey to the Ethiopian coast, where he had to do a ritual for the purification of that land. He and some of the folk there were forced to be on the sea and reach an island in order to secure peace and prosperity. After sailing for about four months, they reached an island and received a warm welcome from the natives there.

The third chapter continued on describing the island and the native on the Island of the Sun. The island was described as a circular form with a circumference of a thousand kilometers near the equator. The islander enjoyed the climate and the ripened fruits as it's warm all year round. They have mastered techniques to grow more fruits and create clothes from oyster shells and certain reed. They also became skillful to catch animals such as fish and birds to the point where food was overproduced.

The fourth chapter gave descriptions of the native appearance and their custom. The native is over six feet tall with soft skins but still strong. Their body is well proportioned with a wider nose and ears. They are very diverse because of their fork tongue that has the ability to multitask conversation with people. They live in a group of a clan with the oldest member ruling each one. The islander does not care much for marriage as they like to raise children and love each other equally. In order to cast out which child is strong and weak, they tested them for a fight against the large bird. Since they are very knowledgeable about hunting, they can prepare meats and roasted food however, they do not know much about condiments and sauces. Even though they are extremely healthy and free from disease, those who reached the age of one hundred and fifty have to kill themselves with a strange plant. Then they are buried under the sand near the low tide.

The fifth chapter provides information about the religion of the islander. They believed in God as the heavens, the sun, and celestial bodies. They celebrate god by throwing feasts and festivals praising to the god with music and songs.

The sixth chapter talked about how the islander does not write its line horizontally but vertically downward. They have twenty-eight different phonetic values but only seven-character unlike how we do. They are mostly concerned with astrology.

The seventh chapter described the type of animals located on the island. There are many kinds and sorts of small animals that are similar to a tortoise. Its skin has yellow lines with four eyes and four mouths. It can walk any directions and when it is being cut up, it glues itself back together.

The eighth chapter talked about how Iambulus was taken to the king of Palibothra by the native villagers. The king allowed Iambulus to travel back to Persia and then later to Greece.

== Publication ==
The original text of Iambulus' Islands of the Sun does not exist today. The only portions of this story that can be read are located in Diodorus Siculus' Bibliotheca historica, and these are in the form of excerpts. The title of the story may also have been, The Adventures of Iambulus in the Southern Ocean, but this is unknown as no original manuscript exists. The publication date, or writing, of this tale has been dated back to around 3rd or 2nd century BCE. The only other references to The Islands of the Sun other than Diodorus Siculus' work, can be found in Lucian's book, True History, and John Tzetzes' writings in Chiliades.

== Historical context ==
Iambulus' Island of the Sun demonstrates many ideas other Hellenistic writers were seen to share. The Hellenistic period was enveloped with geographical and travel literature. Iambulus uses astronomical, geographical, botanical, zoological and anthropological data to authenticate his narrative. Moreover, the description of Iambulus' adventures alludes to events of the Hellenistic period, hence illustrating another aspect that contributes to the authenticity of the story. This idea of using scientific terminology is a theme seen throughout many pieces of Greek literature in this time period.

== Reception ==
This story has been cited by different scholars listing utopian tales of the Hellenistic age. Islands of the Sun is described in the introduction of Lucian's novel True History, and inspired John Tzetzes to mention its tale in his Chiliades.

== See also ==
- The City of the Sun
- A True Story
- New Atlantis
