= Illumine Lingao =

Chuanyue novel by Xiao Feng

- Author: Xiao Feng
- Original title: 临高启明
- Language: Chinese
- Genre: Time travel (chuanyue); Alternate history
- Publisher: China Radio Film & TV Press
- Publication date: 2009–present
- Publication place: China
- Media type: E-book, Print
- ISBN: 978-7504380234

Illumine Lingao (simplified Chinese: 临高启明; traditional Chinese: 臨高啟明; pinyin: lín gāo qǐ míng), also known as Morning Star of Lingao, is an ongoing Chinese chuanyue (time travel) online novel written by many sectional authors and selectively compiled by Xiao Feng (萧峰) under the pen name "Boaster" (Chinese: 吹牛者). The novel was originally published online in 2009 on Qidian Chinese Network. The first print volume was published by China Radio, Film & TV Press in 2017. An English translation was published online in late 2025 at illuminelingao.com.

== Plot ==
Control zone of the time travelers in Lingao County in late spring 1629

In the story, more than 500 people from early-21st-century China intentionally travel back in time via wormhole to the Chongzhen-era late Ming dynasty in 1628 AD. Settling in Lingao County on the island of Hainan, the time travelers set out to establish an industrialized society and change the course of history.

== Publication history ==
The novel originates from an online BBS discussion on Sonicbbs started in 2006, about how time travelers might survive in the late Ming period and history by using modern technologies. In 2008, the topic was revived and extensive discussion on Sonicbbs resulted in the beginning of three different collaborative writing projects, of which Illumine Lingao ultimately became the most successful.

With permission, Xiao Feng, as one of the members of that BBS, collected the ideas by netizens of various educational backgrounds in the discussion, including Ma Qianzu, and adapted them for a chuanyue novel. After several unsuccessful attempts writing the novel by Xiao and the others, he eventually began to publish the novel online in 2009, and then updated the chapters slowly. In the years after the first part was released, he continued to collect fan works written by more and more readers of the novel, and adapted them into the new chapters. The novel first began publishing on Qidian.

In a writing approach analogous to a role-playing game, hundreds of contributors have taken on the roles of more than 500 named characters, contributing draft stories which are selected, revised, and incorporated into the main text. Thousands of other participants have contributed through provided research, reference material, or other ideas for the work.

In 2017, the first volume of a revised version by Xiao himself was published, with more printed sequels rumored to be on the way.

== Responses and influence ==
Starting in the 2010s, China's Internet literature studies became increasingly interested in Illumine Lingao for its collective and collaborative style of writing, and for its detailed descriptions of the proto-industrialized "new world" built by the time travelers. The novel is praised as the "encyclopedia of time travel" among readers. Some critics also call it "a unique phenomenon of contemporary Chinese literature".

Xiao Feng and some of the major fan work writers have held (or participate in) some fan conventions in real life, including a 2017 lecture given by Xiao in Beijing University.

Fans of the book later cultivated a subculture and political ideology, namingly "Industrial Party".

An article about the work appeared in Wired magazine.
