= Atheism Conquered =

Philosophical work by Tommaso Campanella

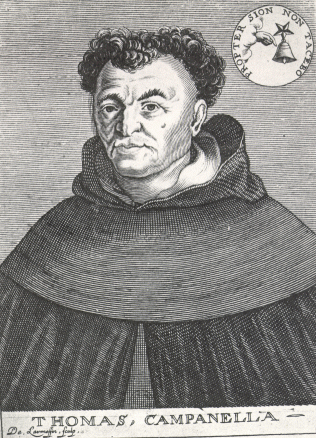
Tommaso Campanella

Atheism Conquered (Latin: Atheismus Triumphatus) is a philosophical work by the Italian Dominican philosopher Tommaso Campanella.

Campanella wrote Atheism Conquered in 1606–1607 in Italian, under the title of Recognoscimento della vera religione universale (Identification of the True Universal Religion), while in prison on suspicion of conspiracy to rebel against Spanish rule over Naples. On June 1, 1607, he dedicated it to the German scholar Caspar Schoppe, who had come to visit him and who suggested the new title. The Italian version survives in the Vatican Library; Campanella subsequently translated it into Latin. Schoppe was not able to have it published, nor was the philosopher Tobias Adami, who had other works by Campanella published in Frankfurt in 1617–1623. The Church regarded it as fomenting Pelagianism, a heresy in which the virtues of humanity are overemphasized at the expense of God's grace. In 1631, after great difficulty and censorship of the text more than once, Campanella managed to publish it in Rome, but the edition was almost immediately impounded. It was finally published in Paris in early 1636 in a collection of Campanella's writings dedicated to King Louis XIII.

In the introductory chapter, Campanella juxtaposes politicians, whose viewpoint, based on self-love, maintains that all religion is political in origin and that there is no truth beyond that, and philosophers, who believe in universal truth and, seeking to benefit mankind but skeptical about supernatural dogma, live according to natural virtue. He wrote from prison that Atheism Conquered was "[a] volume against politicians and Machiavellians". In the second chapter, he presents arguments against religion, specifically Christianity, which he then rebuts in the remainder of the work from the perspective of the world being imbued with and an expression of the divine nature and of the unique nature of humanity in being able to achieve transcendent knowledge and religious insight. He argues that religion is part of natural law, that "human beings have a natural inclination toward justice and toward living within a religion", and that false religions are not an argument against the existence of religious truth, making a comparison with inept doctors not being an argument against the efficacy of medicine. He presents Christianity as the best candidate for a universal religion since it conforms best to natural law.

Campanella described the work as representing his personal progression from rationalism to sincere Christian belief. However, both Protestants and Catholics found the arguments he presents for atheism disturbingly strong.
