= Leonid Ramzin =

Russian engineer (1887–1948)

- Born: Leonid Konstantinovich Ramzin; 26 October 1887; Sosnovka, Morshansky Uyezd, Tambov Governorate, Russian Empire
- Died: 28 June 1948 (aged 60); Moscow, Russian SFSR, USSR
- Education: Imperial Moscow Technical School
- Known for: Invention of the Ramzin boiler, innovations in boiler design, furnace radiation theories
- Awards: Stalin Prize; Order of Lenin; Order of the Red Banner of Labour
- Scientific career
- Fields: Thermal engineering
- Workplaces: Moscow Power Engineering Institute; All-Russia Thermal Engineering Institute; Bauman Moscow State Technical University

Leonid Konstantinovich Ramzin (Russian: Леони́д Константи́нович Рамзи́н; 26 October 1887 – 28 June 1948) was a Soviet thermal engineer, and the inventor of a type of flow-through boiler known as the straight-flow boiler, or Ramzin boiler. He was a laureate of the Stalin Prize First-Class, which he received in 1943.

== Life ==
Leonid Konstantinovich Ramzin was born in the village of Sosnovka in the Tambov Governorate. His parents, Konstantin Filippovich and Praskovya Ivanovna, were teachers at a local school.

=== Studies ===
In 1898, Ramzin entered the Tambov Men's Secondary School. He was taught mathematics by the renowned mathematician Igor Alexandrov. In 1914 he graduated from the Imperial Moscow Technical School, now known as the Bauman Moscow State Technical University, where he received a doctorate of technical sciences. He stayed at the university "for scientific activity", and became a professor there in 1920. He worked closely and was influenced by professors K. V. Kirsch and V. I. Grinevetsky, and after five years of collaboration, he was often cited along with them. For ten years, he headed the academic departments for "Fuel, furnaces and boilers" and "Thermal stations."

=== Gosplan ===
In 1921, he became a member of the Gosplan. Thanks to his professional qualities, Ramzin was recruited to work on the development and carrying-out of the GOELRO plan. He performed missions to the United States, Germany, Belgium, the United Kingdom and Czechoslovakia to gain working experience and to purchase heating and thermal-engineering equipment. He was also one of the chief organizers of the All-Russian Thermal Engineering Institute, and he served as director from 1921 to 1930, and from 1944 to his death in 1948, he was the "scientific coordinator" there.

=== Industrial Party Trial ===
In 1930, Ramzin was accused of fabricated crimes of wrecking (sabotage) as part of the Industrial Party Trial. His witness testimony, in which he described in detail the activity of an alleged secret engineering organization, became the basis for arguments against him and the others accused in the trial. He received the death penalty sentence to be carried by shooting, which was substituted with ten years of imprisonment.

=== Work in the "Sharashkas" ===
While incarcerated, he continued his work on the construction of his flow-through boiler design. In 1933, the first Ramzin boiler was put to use by the "TETs-9" enterprise under Mosenergo. In 1934, Ramzin was made head of the OKB ("Experimental Design Bureau") which headed the construction of Ramzin boilers, organized as part of the ninth State Political Directorate administrative group. This bureau, in which the arrested engineers worked, became one of the first so-called "Sharashka's".

=== Release ===
In 1936, Leonid Ramzin was granted amnesty and released from prison.

In 1943, he, along with academic Andrei Sheglyayev, founded the power-machine building faculty and the academic department for boiler building in the Moscow Power Engineering Institute. Since 1944, Ramzin himself headed the boiler building academic department at the MPEI.

Leonid Ramzin died in 1948. He was buried at the Moscow Armenian Cemetery.

== Works ==
- Rational Direction of the USSR Fuel Economy (Russian: Рациональное Направление Топливного Хозяйства СССР). Moscow, 1930.
- Thermal Power Stations (Russian: Теплосиловые Станции). Moscow, 1930.
- Soviet Straight-Flow Boiler Construction (Russian: Советское Прямоточное Котлостроение) In the collection "Ramzin's Straight-Flow Boilers" (Russian: Прямоточные Котлы Рамзина). Moscow-Leningrad, 1948.

== Awards and prizes ==
- Stalin Prize, first class (1943) — for the creation of the design of the Ramzin boiler.
- Order of the Red Banner of Labour (1946)
- Order of Lenin (1948)
