= Isekai =

Japanese fantasy subgenre about travel to another world

Isekai (Japanese: 異世界; transl. 'different world', 'another world', or 'other world') is a subgenre of Japanese fantasy and science fiction that revolves around a person or people who are transported to and have to survive in another world. In the new world, the person usually gains formidable powers or some other importance that they did not have in the previous world. The transition between worlds may occur through death and reincarnation, or through summoning by an object, god or person in the alternate world. A common setting is a medieval fantasy world populated with humans, humanoids, and monsters. In a reverse isekai, a person from another world is transported to planet Earth.

The concept of isekai started in Japanese folktales, such as the story of Urashima Tarō, and Western fantasy literature. The first modern isekai works were Haruka Takachiho's novel Warrior from Another World and the anime television series Aura Battler Dunbine, while The Twelve Kingdoms and Sword Art Online helped to popularize the genre. Since the 2000s, isekai novels are increasingly published online on websites like Shōsetsuka ni Narō. Isekai is one of the most popular genres of anime and has been noted for its appeal to salarymen as a form of escapism.

== History ==
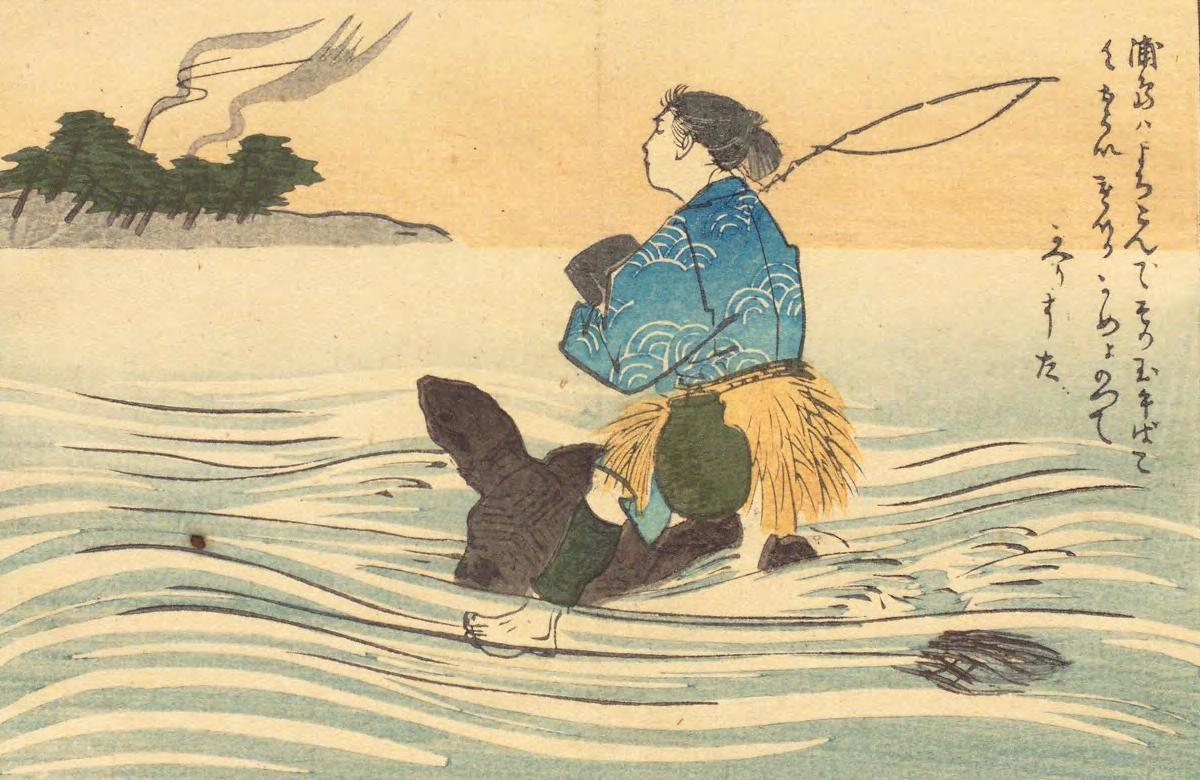
Urashima Tarō returns to his village by riding a turtle. The folktale is one of the earliest origins of the isekai genre.

The origins of the isekai genre are traced back to the Japanese folktales of fisherman Urashima Tarō, where he saves a turtle and is rewarded by being brought to a wondrous undersea kingdom. After spending what he believed to be several days there, Urashima returns to his home village only to find himself 100 years in the future. Isekai's origins are also traced to Western fantasy literature, notably Alice's Adventures in Wonderland and The Wonderful Wizard of Oz.

The first modern Japanese isekai story is considered to be Warrior from Another World (1979) by Haruka Takachiho, while the first Japanese isekai anime is considered to be Aura Battler Dunbine (1983). In the 1990s, The Twelve Kingdoms gained widespread popularity, which helped popularize the genre.

A popular isekai light novel and anime series in the 2000s was The Familiar of Zero. Inspired by The Familiar of Zero fanfiction, isekai novels began to be published online on novel posting sites like Shōsetsuka ni Narō, with Re:Zero and Mushoku Tensei being among the first novels to popularize this format. Isekai web novels gained more prominence following the release of the anime adaptation of Sword Art Online in 2012. Although its creator disputes this, Sword Art Online is considered to be a modern pioneer of the isekai genre. Sword Art Online is also sometimes considered to be the start of the modern isekai boom and around this time is when the term isekai started to be used.

In May 2021, Kadokawa announced they would open an "Isekai Museum" in July of the same year. In March 2024, the word isekai was added into the Oxford English Dictionary.

== Characteristics ==
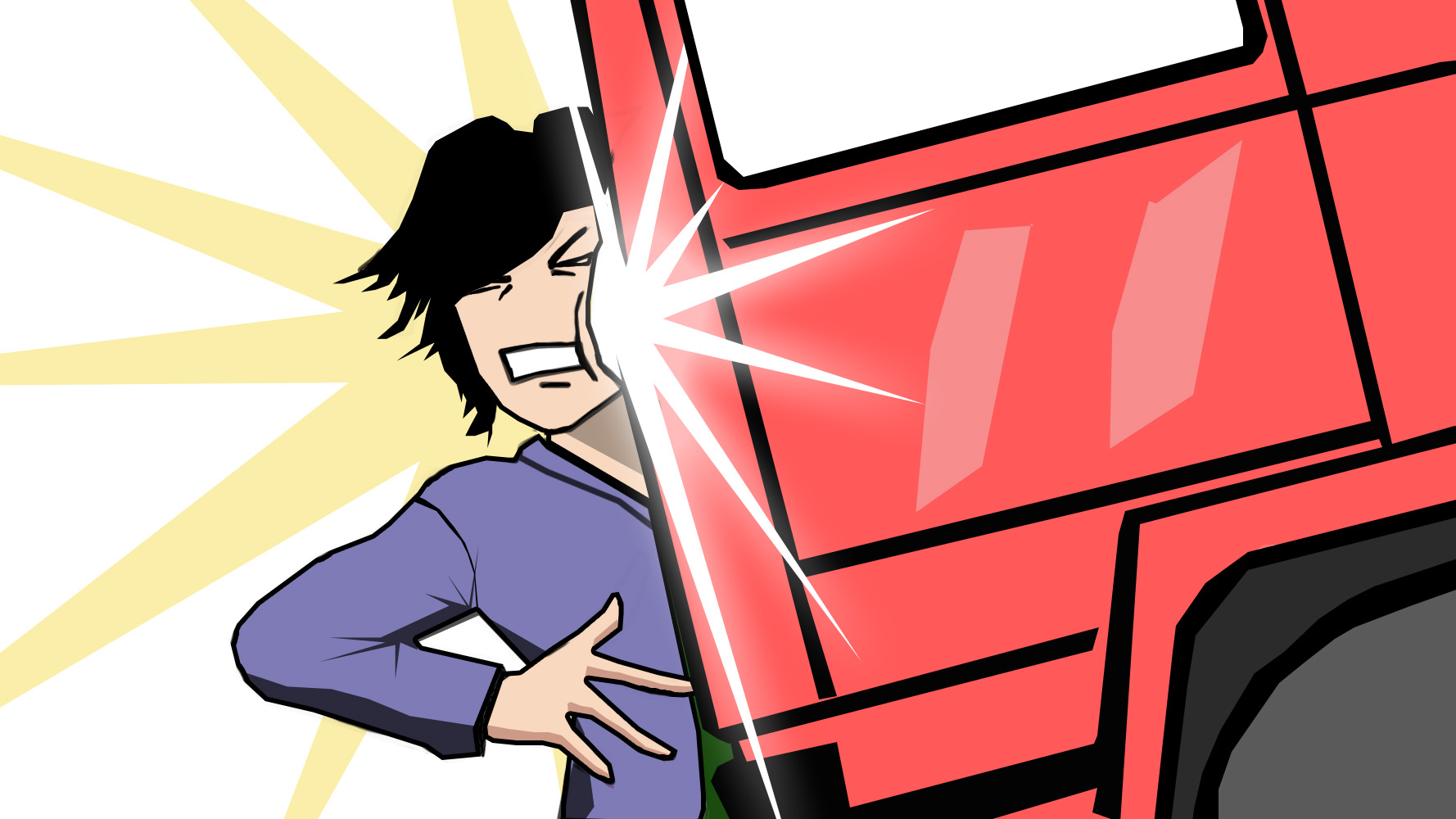
In isekai stories where the protagonist is killed, getting hit by a truck is a common cause of death, which made the Truck-kun meme.

In isekai stories, a person from the real-world, usually one with negative elements in their life, is somehow transported to an alternate world where they obtain formidable powers or some other importance that they did not have in reality. Often this involves skills and knowledge they learned in their previous life, which are far more advanced in the modern world than in the world they are sent to. In some cases, when a character enters the new world, they gain or manifest special powers or abilities that are often referred to as "cheats", which allow them to adapt to this new world more easily and to become strong more quickly.

Japan Anime News divided isekai stories into two categories: reincarnation into another world, where the protagonist is reborn in another world with memories of their past life, and transition into another world, where the protagonist moves from the real world to the isekai world. According to an analysis by Paul Price of the Journal of Anime and Manga Studies, adult men are the most common isekai protagonists, with the ratio of male to female protagonists being 2.4 to 1 and the ratio of adult to teenage protagonists being 1.4 to 1. He also divided the method of transportation into the new world into six categories: reincarnation, divine act, summoning, specific tool, pulled into a game, and no explanation. In some stories, the protagonist may enter a liminal space between worlds, often with a god, where the role of the protagonist is decided. Occasionally, the protagonist may enter as part of a group rather than by themselves, though this is less common.

Most of the time, the summoning was malicious or accidental and the protagonist usually rejects the assigned purpose they are given. In most stories, the protagonist's body is somehow changed, such as taking a non-human form (either a monster, a humanoid being, or a sentient object) or remaining a human but with small changes (e.g. gaining magical powers or being a bit more athletic) or major changes (e.g. changing gender or becoming an infant). In most stories, the protagonist forms a group where they are the central individual.

The setting of an isekai story varies, though the majority are set in a medieval-like world populated with humans, humanoids, and monsters. In this world, magic exists and technology is limited. This setting can contain LitRPG elements and draws heavily from JRPG video games. Other settings include dating sims, battle royale games, non-gaming fantasy worlds, other planets, and dream worlds.

Isekai stories are often mixed with a variety of different genres and themes. One common approach is the "slow life", where the protagonist was overworked in their previous life, so they decide to take it easy in the next. Sometimes the protagonist uses the new world to explore an interest, hobby, or goal they had in the previous world but were unable to achieve, such as opening a business, like in Restaurant to Another World. Another common approach is the isekai villainess anime, where the protagonist takes the role of the villainess in an otome game. Isekai stories are considered to be distinct from time travel and VRMMORPG stories.

In stories where the protagonist dies before being transported, a common method of death is being run over by a truck and dying, which spawned the meme of "Truck-kun", a truck which appears in many isekai series that kills the protagonist, which leads to them reincarnating into a different world.

Several isekai works have long titles. J-Novel Club CEO Samuel Pinarsky said that this is caused by Shōsetsuka ni Narō listing chapters by title only, so writers felt they needed to have a more descriptive title to attract readers.

=== Reverse ===
Reverse isekai is a subgenre of isekai that follows beings from a futuristic or fantasy world who have been transported to Earth and have to adjust to everyday life. Reverse isekai stories are sometimes considered to predate isekai ones, with Mitsuteru Yokoyama's Sally the Witch (1966) cited as an early example.

== Analysis ==
A survey of isekai viewers in Japan found the average age to be 46, while a 2024 survey of isekai viewers in English-speaking territories found the average age to be about 30. Kadokawa editor Satoshi Arima stated that isekai stories appeal to salarymen who want to switch jobs as a form of escapism since the protagonists are able to live their lives the way they desire. Animation critic Charles Solomon wrote that the genre appeals to people who fantasize about starting their lives over again with a new career and identity. For young adults, isekai can serve as a release for those frustrated with being stuck in a rigid life plan. The 2024 survey in English-speaking territories found that 65 percent of isekai viewers are male and some isekai stories have been noted as catering to male-centered sexual desires. Due to the large number of isekai stories with similar plot points, the genre has been described as an example of database consumption.

Stevie Suan of The Japan Times argued that isekai can be seen as an allegory for globalization. Suan felt that anime being released in a foreign country and having to adapt to that culture is similar to the premise of isekai stories and that Cool Japan, an initiative to promote Japanese culture abroad, was launched around the time isekai stories became popular. He noted that in As a Reincarnated Aristocrat, I'll Use My Appraisal Skill to Rise in the World, Ars Louvent forms a multiethnic coalition to support him in a manner similar to the way anime is outsourced to other countries for part of its production. Suan also pointed to That Time I Got Reincarnated as a Slime, where Rimuru creates a city modeled after Japan while also befriending and allying with various different ethnicities.

== Popularity ==
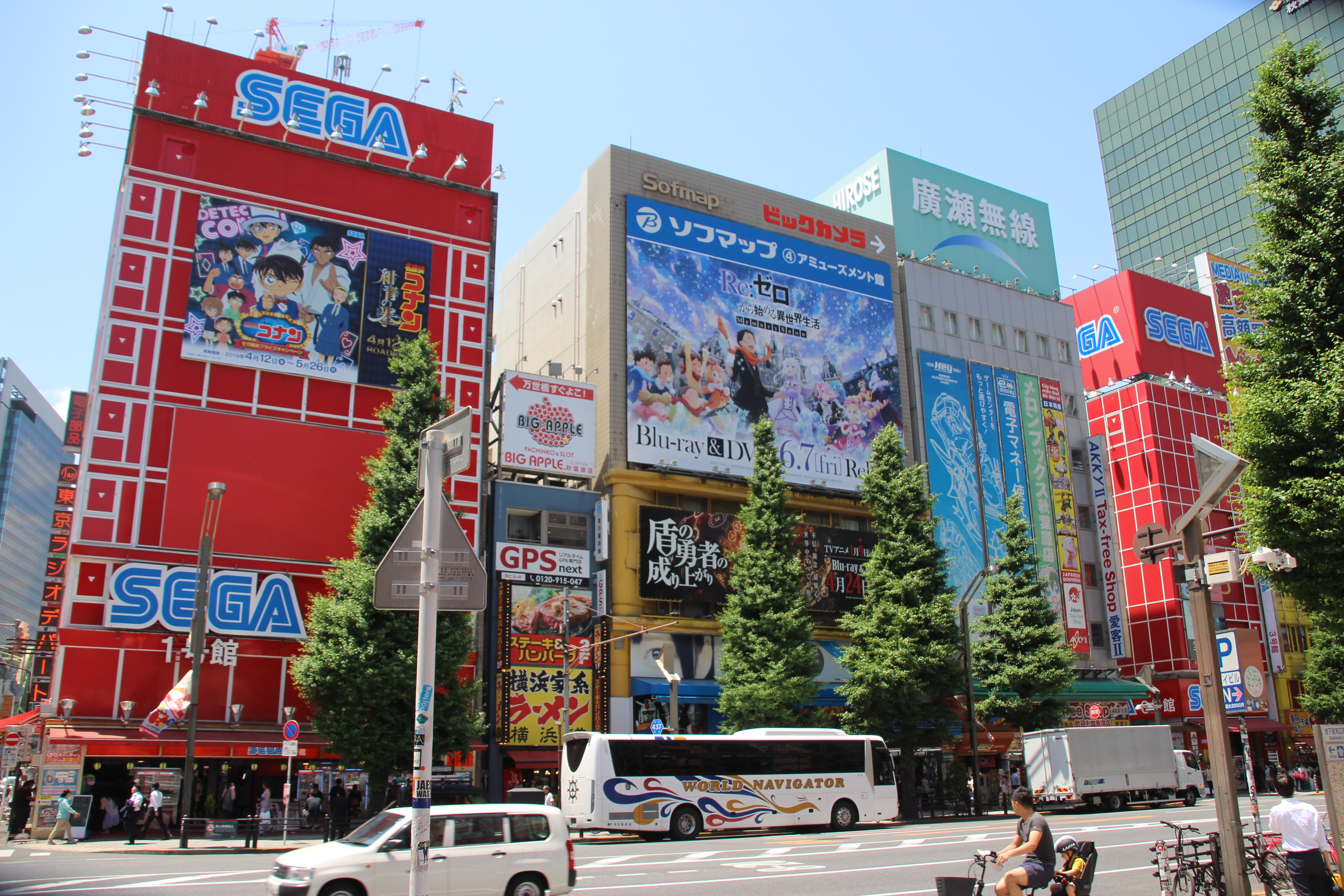
Advertisements for Re:Zero and The Rising of the Shield Hero in Akihabara in 2019.

Isekai is one of the most popular genres of anime. According to Price, from 2017 to 2019, 385 isekai manga series were published in English, which is about one new series every three days. During the same time, 39 isekai anime were broadcast, which is about one per month. In 2024, isekai anime were 14 percent of all new anime releases, while also being the second most popular genre in English-speaking territories, just behind action. In addition to Japan, isekai stories are popular in the United States and China. Isekai elements are also common in manhwa (Korean comics).

The isekai genre became so popular during the 2010s that it began to generate backlash from those who felt like it started to overcrowd the greater manga and anime market. In 2016, a Japanese short story contest organized by Bungaku Free Market and Shōsetsuka ni Narō placed a blanket ban on any entries involving isekai. The publisher Kadokawa banned isekai stories as well in their own anime/manga-style novel contest in 2017. In its 2025 fiscal year, Kadokawa's publishing business' profitability declined significantly, with an overreliance on isekai works cited as a reason for the decline.

== See also ==
- Chuanyue – Chinese fantasy about crossing into another era
- Magical realism – Style of literary fiction and art
- Portal fantasy – Fantasy narratives involving travel through portals
- Suspended animation in fiction – Theme in science fiction
- Xianxia – Chinese fantasy genre
