= Accidental travel =

Fantasy subgenre about being transferred to another world or time

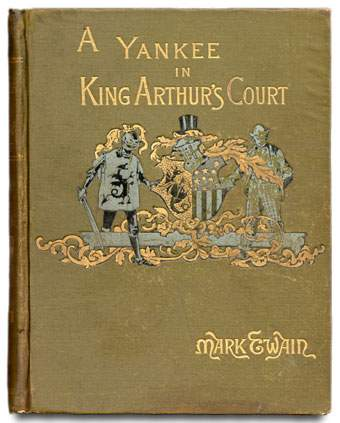
An accidental time travel classic

Accidental travel is a speculative fiction plot device in which ordinary people accidentally find themselves outside of their normal place or time, often for no apparent reason, a particular type of the "fish-out-of-water" plot.

In Russia, the genre is known as popadanstvo; it became popular in the early 2000s. In Japanese fiction, the genre of accidental transport into a parallel universe or fantasy world is known as isekai

== Types ==
The accidental time travel trope is specifically known as time slip. A classical example of time slip is Mark Twain's A Connecticut Yankee in King Arthur's Court (1889), which had considerable influence on later writers.

Other kinds of accidental travel include space travel (e.g., through accidental wormholes, portals (portal fantasy) or other spatial irregularities, or a catastrophic spatial event), travel to an alternative universe, an RPG universe (litRPG), or into an alternative history. All of the listed examples, however, classify as accidental travel only when the plot involves a broadly considered accident, and is not done purposefully.

An early example of catastrophic space travel is Hector Servadac (1877) by Jules Verne, where a piece of the Earth with several Earthlings is ripped off by a comet. In Les Robinsons du cosmos (The Robinsons of the Cosmos) (1955) by Francis Carsac, pieces of France and the US with plenty of population are ripped off and planted on an alien planet during a collision of two galaxies.

In 1912 Edgar Rice Burroughs invented John Carter of Mars, who mysteriously lands on Mars from a sacred cave where he was hiding from the Apaches.

Still another way to land somewhere is to be abducted or invited by aliens to live in an advanced star-faring civilization. Common cliches of this type include becoming a slave, or a warrior, or a dying person getting a second chance, with the subsequent social advance.

A particular kind of effortless accidental travel is finding oneself in some other place or time occupying someone's else mind, via identity transfer, body swap (mind swap) or mind/body sharing. Carsac wrote the story with the trick of this type as well: in Terre en fuite (1960) a scientist hit by lightning suddenly becomes a genius and before his death he reveals that his mind melded with the mind of a scientist from far future. However most of the novel is the description of the future of the Earth expecting the Sun to turn supernova. Three years earlier John Dickson Carr used this version of the device in the detective genre in his Fire, Burn!, which transports a 1950s detective's consciousness to the early days of the Metropolitan Police in 1829.

== In Japan ==
In Japanese fiction, the genre of accidental transport into a parallel universe or fantasy world is known as isekai.

== In Russia ==
Russian fandom knows the trope as popadanchestvo (Russian: попаданчество) or as popadanstvo (Russian: попаданство) — both terms derive (with the suffixes -ство, -ество) from the neologism popadanets (Russian: попаданец), a person who accidentally finds themself elsewhere/elsewhen. (Note: Popadanets, plural: popadantsy, female: popadanka, is a Russian neologism derived from the verb popast, "to get or land into (something)".) The Russian term has an ironical flavor, because popadantsy have become widespread clichés in Russian pulp science-fiction. Russian critic Boris Nevsky traces this plot device to at least Gulliver's Travels (18th century). According to the Russian publishing house Eksmo, typical actions of a popadanets include efforts to adapt to the world in which they arrive, to save it, to strive to return, or to transform it to their own needs.

Around the year 2000 popadanstvo gained an immense popularity in Russian science-fiction and fantasy. Responding to the demand, the supply of the novels of this type skyrocketed, with an inevitable drop of the overall quality and degeneration of the inventiveness of the writers into a series of clichés.

A significant number of popadanstva take place at some key moment in the Russian past. Armed with modern knowledge, our heroes turn the tide to the glory of the Motherland, i.e., a popadanets becomes a progressor and builds an alternative history. Analysts have suggested that this phenomenon of Russian science-fiction includes two motivations: a "Mary Sue"-type drive to self-fulfillment, and patriotic nostalgia for the times of Soviet superpower (Communist nostalgia). Russian political scientist Boris Vishnevskiy considers the phenomenon of popadanstvo as a manifestation of post-Soviet Russian revanchism, which, he thinks, has become the cornerstone of Russian politics under Vladimir Putin.

In 2024 Eliot Borenstein published a book, Unstuck in Time: On the Post-Soviet Uncanny, about Soviet nostalgia in Russian literary fiction. Chapters 1 and 2 feature popadantsy who want to change the future: Borenstein calls these "Time Crashers". (Cornell University Press offers a free e-book online).

A typical Russian popadanets can represent one of the three types: an everyman, a commando, or a reenactor, with all undergoing a social lift after travel.

While the standard Russian popadanets used to be a male, since the 2000s a flood of pulp fiction has emerged featuring female popadanka protagonists, typically in the form of romance fiction, where the popadanka develops into a mighty sorceress or becomes a bride of a mighty man: a king, a sorcerer, an elf, a vampire, etc., often via an "academy of magic". The livelib.ru website featured 360 books about females landing in some magical world published in 2016, 422 in 2017, and 433 in 2018.

In 2016 Sergey Lukyanenko wrote a parody short-story, Vitya Solnyshkin and Iosif Stalin Витя Солнышкин и Иосиф Сталин. Young pioneer Vitya chances to meet Joseph Stalin and explains that he is in fact from the future. Stalin is not at all surprised: for years now time-travelers have swarmed to advise Stalin, but comrade Stalin does not rush to follow their advice: he is quite sure that Adolf Hitler and Franklin Roosevelt have similar "advisors" as well, and with all the conflicting advice, history stays in its old tracks.

In 2010 the publishing-house Tsentrpoligraf started the book series "Наши там", "Nashi Tam", 'Ours Over There' about popadantsy. By 2026, FantLab listed over 290 items.

=== In film ===
Russian films about popadantsy include:

- Black Hunters (the original Russian title translates as "We are From the Future") (2008) and its sequel (2010) about treasure-hunters (called "black diggers" in Russian) who find themselves in 1942 on the World War II Eastern Front
- The Mist, Russian television film about three Russian soldiers, popadantsy into 1941 on the Eastern Front
- Frontier about popadantsy into the Nevsky Pyatachok frontline during the Siege of Leningrad of 1941-1944
- Mirror for a Hero, a 1987 film combining popadanstvo with "time loop" in late 1940s.

== See also ==
- Dream world (plot device)
- Chuanyue
- Imaginary voyage
- Rip van Winkle, an archetypal story of a man who fell asleep and woke up in a different time many years later.
- Robinsonade
- Time travel in fiction
