= Chuanyue =

Chinese fantasy about crossing into another era

Chuānyuè (Chinese: 穿越, lit. 'crossing'), also chuānkōng (Chinese: 穿空; shortened from chuānyuè shíkōng (Chinese: 穿越時空; lit. 'interdimensional travel')), is a Chinese genre of speculative fiction where the protagonist normally travels back in time to historical periods or travels to parallel universes and different worlds. Time travel in these stories is most often in the direction of the past and may include fantasy or magical motifs.

== Genre characteristics ==
In chuanyue, the protagonist either travels back in time to historical periods, or travels to a different world. In both interpretations, the traveler comes to the new reality either in their physical body or they transmigrate into a local resident's body. It can also incorporate alternative histories and parallel universes. Magical or fantasy motifs are also frequently encountered in these stories. In addition, many of the speculative ideas that are key to the genre are impossible in the real world.

Chuanyue can be considered a "reinvention" of time travel writing that includes facets of fantasy fiction. Most time travel in chuanyue is backwards in time, rather than forwards in time. Overall, stories describing hypothetical futures are "relatively underrepresented" because of various political and cultural reasons in China. One political reason for a lack of future time-travel narratives is that the Chinese government already has an official narrative of modern Chinese history and an official direction for the future.

A Korean version of this genre is known as hoegwi (Korean: 회귀) or bing-ui (Korean: 빙의).

=== Representative works ===
One of the first popular time-travel stories in this genre is Tales of Seeking Qin (pinyin: Xun Qin Ji) by Huang Yi, published in 1991 and adapted into a television series in 2001.

Other works include Go Princess Go (2015), Illumine Lingao (2009), The Myth (2010), Palace (2011), Romance of Tiger and Rose (2020) and Startling by Every Step (2011).

== Common subgenres ==
Various subgenres are popular in chuanyue stories. These can include alternate worlds (pinyin: yi shijie), ancient armored machine fiction (pinyin: gu jijia xiaoshuo), Eastern-style fantasy (pinyin: xuanhuan), Eastern-style suspense (pinyin: xuanyi), evolution and metamorphosis (pinyin: jinhua bianyi), gaming (pinyin: youxi), interstellar civilizations (pinyin: xingji wenming), post-apocalyptic worlds (pinyin: moshi weiji), spacetime travel (pinyin: shikong chuanyue), super technologies (pinyin: chaoji keji), and urban (pinyin: dushi). Xuanhuan novels, like A Step Into the Past (1994) by Huang Yi, are very popular online.

As of 2026, what the writer Mimi Jiang called "farming novels" were popular, which send the protagonist into a natural environment untouched by humanity, where merely surviving is the challenge. Jiang considered these novels "perhaps (...) a form of psychological compensation for the looming robot age".

Chuanyue may also contain romantic elements. Time travel romance is known as chuanyue yanqing (Chinese: 穿越言情). These romantic stories are most often written by and for women. Many of these stories include female protagonists traveling through time to Ancient China, where they may experience culture shock and later romance among the royal family.

Some sub-genres of time travel fiction address political issues, engaging with themes of an ideal China, China's developmental path, and contemporary ideas like the Chinese Dream. One such sub-genre is "aiding-communist" texts, in which time traveling protagonists journey back in time to help the Communist Party and the country.

=== Kuaichuan ===
Another popular subgenre is Kuaichuan (Chinese: 快穿) which literally means “speedy chuanyue,” usually translated as "quick transmigration." Quick transmigration stories are made up of several short stories which can be made up of different subgenres or different settings which link together into one larger, contained story. Subgenres that can appear in these stories is varied, with some stories including apocalyptic settings or alternate universes. Quick transmigration stories can also feature themes of revenge and retribution which are meant to be enjoyed by the reader. It might also include themes often seen in danmei.

==== Representative works ====
One of the first representations of this genre are Journey in Search of Previous Incarnations (Chinese: 寻找前世之旅; pinyin: Xuzhao Qianshi Zhi Lü), and Endless Dread (Chinese: 无限恐怖; pinyin: Wuxian Kongbu) both published online in 2007.

Some notable examples include: Cheating Men Must Die (Chinese: 万渣朝凰; pinyin: Wàn zhā cháo huáng) (manhua), Cannon Fodder's Record of Counterattacks (Chinese: 炮灰女配逆袭记) (web novel, with manhua adaptations).

=== Qingchuan ===
A popular subgenre is Qingchuan (Chinese: 清穿), where the often female protagonist travels back to the Qing dynasty and engages in romance with the sons of Qing Emperors. The three novels Bubu Jingxin, Meng Hui Da Qing, and Yao Hua are the first three Qingchuan novels. They are also called "the three hills of Qingchuan novel". Qingchuan novels are of great popularity among Chinese people, especially the young women. Some of the novels like Bu Bu Jingxin are so popular that they have already been adapted into TV series. These TV series have won great audience ratings since broadcast.

== Reception ==
In the 2000s, chuanyue became one of the most popular literary genres on the Chinese Internet, with more than tens of thousands of different titles available on different platforms. By 2016, it was one of the "dominant genres."

Chuanyue can be seen as "potentially chronopolitically subversive." The state has enacted some targeted policies to curb certain entries in the genre. By 2009, several popular chuanyue stores were adapted for Chinese television. But by April 2011, the Chinese government through the State Administration of Radio, Film and Television (SARFT) put an official ban on time-travel television shows. The web series, Go Princess Go! (Chinese: 太子妃升职记) was heavily censored before its re-release in 2015. Despite the ban on time travel television, streaming platforms and online novels in this genre remain popular.

Critics of the genre claim that wish-fulfillment in time travel fantasies can have a negative psychological impact on young readers. This concept is often called "YY fiction" where the YY is short for yiyin or 'lust of the mind' (Chinese: 意淫). YY fiction can be considered in Chinese culture to be an "explicit exploration of libidinous mental fulfillment."

Chuanyue with BL (boy's love) or danmei themes has also faced censorship in China, despite their growing popularity internationally.

Others, like author Ken Liu, have described chuanyue as part of a diverse and "vibrant" Chinese science fiction community. Shuangyi Li sees chuanyue as an artistic way to enrich our lives through exploring the past culture and history of China.

== See also ==
- Accidental travel – Fantasy subgenre about being transferred to another world or time
- Dream world (plot device) – Fantasy about worlds accessed through dreams
- Isekai – Japanese fantasy subgenre about travel to another world
- Portal fantasy – Fantasy narratives involving travel through portals
- Suspended animation in fiction – Theme in science fiction
- Time travel in fiction – Concept and accompanying genre in fiction
