= Antonius Diogenes =

2nd-century BC Greek writer

Antonius Diogenes (Koine Greek: Ἀντώνιος Διογένης) was the author of an ancient Greek romance entitled The Wonders Beyond Thule (Τὰ ὑπὲρ Θoύλην ἄπιστα). Scholars have placed him in the 2nd century A.D., but his age was unknown even to Photius I, Patriarch of Constantinople, who wrote a synopsis of the romance. The romance was a novel of twenty-four books and was written in the form of a dialogue about travels. Photios highly praised it for its vivid narration, clarity, and the gracefulness of its descriptions.

Scholars have tended to take it as a given that Lucian had Diogenes' work principally in mind when he wrote his celebrated parody, A True Story. Upon extensive comparative study of the two works, J.R. Morgan has questioned this accepted notion.

== Summary of the novel in Photios ==
The current knowledge of the novel's content is from Photios, who left a summary in his Myriobiblos, a lengthy volume advising his idle brother, Tarasios, which books to read. Two sections in Porphyry also partially survive, where the novel is used as a historical source for his Life of Pythagoras, but neither section is very helpful about the plot. The few surviving papyrus fragments of the novel, however, do reveal some aspects of the structure and content. Even though Photios praises the work in high tones, both for its style clarity and its plot credibility, his summary of the content creates a confusing impression, mainly because of the multiple nested levels of narration.

The novel begins in the outermost layer, where the author introduces a Roman named Faustinus, who travels the world searching for rare books to give to his bibliophile sister, Isidora. His latest journey has taken him to Tyros. A corresponding letter from the author follows a dedication to his own sister, also named Isidora.

Faustinus discovers a letter whose contents form the novel's first frame. It was written by Balagros, a Greek soldier in the Somatophylakes of Alexander the Great, to his wife Phila, the eldest daughter of Antipater; the couple are genuine historical figures incorporated into the novel. Balagros reports that after the conquest of Tyros, Alexander, Hephaistion and Parmenion were shown a hypogeum containing several stone sarcophagi. These were adorned with peculiar inscriptions:

"Lysilla lived 35 years"
"Mnason, son of Mantinias lived 66 years, then 71 years"
"Aristion, son of Philocles lived 47 years, then 52 years"
"Mantinias, son of Mnason lived, 42 years, then 706 nights"
"Derkyllis, daughter of Mnason lived, 39 years, then 760 nights"
"Deinias the Arcas, lived 125 years"

Thus, the readers are introduced to the novel's significant characters. Also in the hypogeum was a box of cypress wood bearing the inscription: "Oh, stranger, who opens this, learn from the miracles." Inside, Alexander and his companions found documents composed by Deinias and Derkyllis, which form the novel's main narrative.

In this narrative, two Greek natives of Arcadia, Deinias and his son Demochares, are on a journey to the outermost edges of the Ecumene. Beyond the Pontos, they reach the springs of the river Tanais and the Riphean Mountains, and, beyond these, the outer ocean. After a long journey across Oceanus—in the course of which three traveling companions called Karmanes, Meniskos, and Azulis join them—they at last reach the legendary island of Thule (perhaps Iceland, the Faroe Islands, Shetland, or Norway).

There, they find a certain Phoenician noblewoman named Derkyllis, a native of Tyros. Derkyllis and Deinias fall in love with each other. She reveals to him the sad and rather convoluted adventures she endured alongside her brother, Mantinias. Years later, an elderly Deinias confides the stories of Derkyllis and Mantinias, as well as his own experiences, to Kymbas, an envoy of the Arcadian League, sent to Tyros to summon Deinias back home.

In the narrative of Derkyllis, she and Mantinias, children of Mnasion, are driven from their home by the schemes of the novel's villain, an Egyptian priest named Paapis. Feigning gratitude to Mnasion's family, who have been his benefactors, Paapis works to steal their wealth. He tricks the children into giving their parents a supposedly benevolent magic formula, which puts them into a deathlike sleep. Believing that they have murdered their parents, Derkyllis and Mantinias flee in grief, first arriving at Rhodes and Crete, then continuing onto the lands of the Tyrrhenians and the Cimmerians. Deep in the land of barbarians and at the edge of the known world, Derkyllis finds the entrance to Hades and meets a deceased servant named Myrto, who teaches her secrets of the Underworld.

Returning from Hades, Derkyllis and her companions, Keryllos and Astraios, come by the "grave of the Siren." The story here gets more entangled because it inserts portions of the life of Pythagoras—the ones quoted by Porphyry in his biography of Pythagoras.

Astraios explains how, during a journey, Mnesarchus, a stepfather of Pythagoras, noticed the child's exceptional abilities as he watched him lying under a white poplar, looking at the sun without blinking. The poplar was dripping nourishing dew from a small tube. Endeared with this prodigy child, Mnesarchus took him along for the journey. On the isle of Samos, he entrusted the child to the care of a native citizen named Androcles. Finally, Androcles adopted the boy, whom he named Astraios, and raised him with his biological sons Eunostos, Tyrrhenos, and Pythagoras. Astraios now reports how Androcles had taken up the education of Pythagoras, training him in the lyre, wrestling, and painting. The philosopher Anaximander of Miletus taught the boy of the deepest wisdom of the Egyptians, the Arabs, the Chaldeans, and the Hebrews. Astraios himself had been handed over to Pythagoras, who, after a physiognomic test, accepted him as a student. Thus ends the report of Astraios—which is Porphyry's citation of Antonius Diogenes about the life of Pythagoras, which is also reflected what Astraios had heard by a woman named Philotis regarding Pythagoras and his teachings.

This detour in the story completed, the existing members of the Derkyllis, Keryllos, and Astraios group arrive in Iberia, first into a city whose inhabitants are blind during daytime, although they can see at night. With the help of a flute, Astraios harms their enemies, the bloodthirsty and stupid Celts, from whom the team flees by changing their horses' colors, escaping to Akytania. Astraios is particularly appreciated because the waning and waxing of his eyes is thought to correspond to the waning and waxing of the moon. The moon's changes regulate the change of rule between the local kings. Derkyllis is impressed by the people of Artabrians, whose women go to war while the men stay home and look after the household chores. Somehow, the Asturians overtake Keryllos and execute him as a punishment for an old debt.

The Derkyllis team then returns to Italy and Sicily. They are captured at Mount Eryx and driven before Ainesidemos, the tyrant of Leontinoi. In the court of the tyrant they are confronted by Paapis, the Egyptian villain, but Derkyllis, to her delight, also meets her lost brother Mantinias. He has experienced an even more peculiar journey, and tells his sister about his visits to the realms of the Sun and Moon, beyond the edge of the world. This is the section that seems to have been parodied by Lucian in his True History.

The reunited siblings flee Paapis, carrying off some of his magic books and a box with magical plants. They escape to Rhegion and then to Metapontum, a center of Pythagorean studies, where they meet with Astraios once more. Continuing with him, they travel to the lands of the Getae and the Thracians, where they come across the Thracian (and probably also Pythagorean) sage, Zalmoxis. Zalmoxis predicts that the siblings will finally get to Thule, where the unintentionally committed crime against their parents will be atoned for by them willingly suffering a similar fate. So the siblings are off to Thule, still hunted by the evil Paapis, who confronts them again. Engaging some magical spell, he spits at their faces. This induces in them a deathlike sleep from which they can only arise after every sunset. Thruscanes, a resident of Thule and witness to the alleged murder by Derkyllis and her brother, kills Paapis along with himself. Yet, because the siblings are believed to be dead, they are given a memorial and buried. At night, they awaken. It turns out that Paapis' spell only works during the day; the siblings are alive and well at night.

Subsequently, the siblings' companion, Azulis, and the Arcadian travelers, Deinias and Demochares, begin to study Paapis' books of magic. They search for the means to relieve Derkyllis and Mantinias from the vampire-like curse that haunts them, hoping as well to help the parents of the two, who, back in Tyros, apparently suffer from a similar condition of living death. Finally, the entire team, including the siblings, heads back to Tyros. But Deinias, traveling with Karmanes and Meniskos, again finds himself straying from the destination, ending up further north. So these fellows enter the territory of eternal night and finally reach the Moon, where the three travelers meet with Sibyl. She grants them the fulfillment of one request each. Deinias wishes to return to his beloved Derkyllis in Tyros, which is granted. Falling asleep—like Odysseus does in Skheria—Deinias wakes up in Tyros, where eventually all are happily reunited.

It can be surmised that, at this point, the novel works its way back through one or more of the nested frames and ends.

== Interpretation ==
The 24-volume book is only synoptically reproduced by Photios, and it seems probable that the contents of his summary do not conform to the novel's actual extent. It has been assumed that a substantial part of the summary contents is meant for starters to be read as paradox material. The assumption is also supported by Photios explicitly admitting to noticing digressions and bays.

Regarding interpretation and classification of the work, the research is primarily concerned with two interrelated questions. Firstly, concerning the nature of the novel. Obviously, the Pythagoreans' teachings play a certain role in the novel—but how was it supposed to be read in the first place? Is it lightly read as a mystery novel, a love story, or even a trivial travelogue?

Karl Bürger and Reinhold Merkelbach believed it was intended to be a mystery novel. Rohde points out several references to the Pythagorean religion, choosing not to interpret the novel exclusively as a mystery book. If the relationship between Lucian's A True Story and the Wonders beyond Thule is undisputed, what is the nature of the True Histories parody? Is the ridicule directed against the dizzy genre of pseudohistorical travel narration, or is it against the novel's particular religious overtone? And if so, is Lucian criticizing the wider asterism of Pythagorean ideas, or is he in opposition to a particular sect?

Klaus Reyhl went to extremes in his dissertation examining the dependency of the True Histories on the Apista, claiming that it is possible to reconstruct the Apista, at least in parts. This view was not widely accepted. Morgan rejected Reyhl's thesis in his study.

The original text is not attested. Surviving traditional texts like the Aethiopica of Heliodorus of Emesa, compared to their corresponding summaries of Photios in Myriobiblos, add a word of caution. To base far-reaching deductions on the scope of the existing plot summary is rather risky. No solid conclusions are possible from the scanty, confused, and sometimes difficult-to-grasp summary Photios gave, originally only meant as an incentive for his idle brother, Tarasios, to read the novel.

== See also ==
- Pythagoreanism
