= Fortunate Isles =

Semi-legendary islands in the Atlantic Ocean

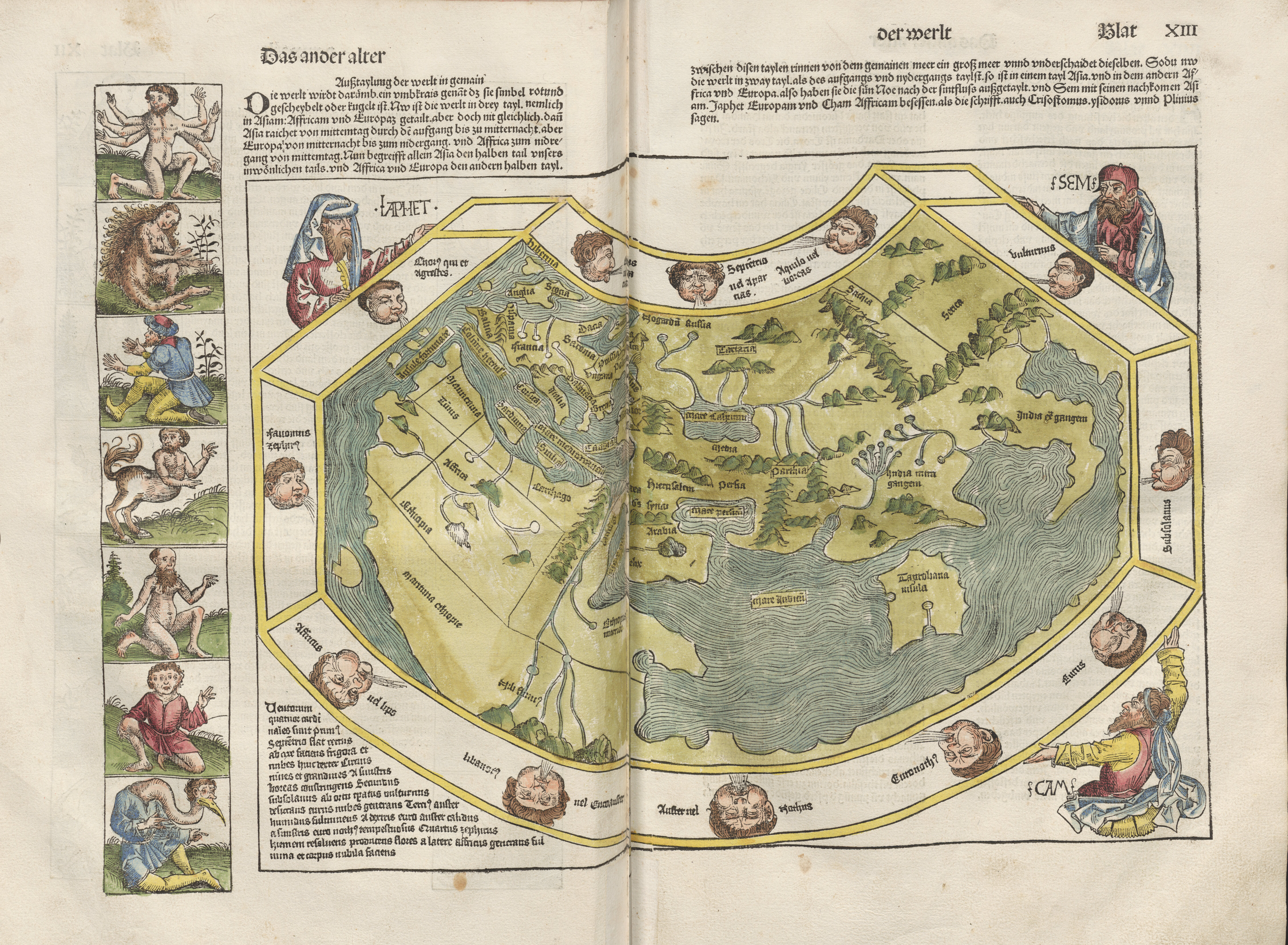
Woodcut from the Nuremberg Chronicle (1493) by Hartmann Schedel depicting the Fortunate Islands in the Atlantic Ocean.

The Fortunate Isles or Isles of the Blessed (Ancient Greek: μακάρων νῆσοι, makarōn nēsoi) were semi-legendary islands in the Atlantic Ocean, variously treated as a simple geographical location and as a winterless earthly paradise inhabited by the heroes of Greek mythology. In the time of Hesiod, the Fortunate Isles were associated with the concept of Elysium, a utopian location in the Greek underworld thought to be found in the Western ocean on the edge of the known world. The number of the islands would later be reduced to one by the poet Pindar.

== Legend ==
According to Greek mythology, the islands were reserved for those who had chosen to be reincarnated three times, and managed to be judged as especially pure enough to gain entrance to the Elysian Fields all three times. The Theban poet Pindar reduced the number of the islands to one, describing it as having shady parklands with residents indulging in athletic and musical pastimes, activities that were thought to be the ideal life for ancient Greek aristocracy.

== Accounts ==
Flavius Philostratus' Life of Apollonius of Tyana (v.3) says, "And they also say that the Islands of the Blessed are to be fixed by the limits of Libya where they rise towards the uninhabited promontory." In this geography Libya was considered to extend westwards through Mauretania "as far as the mouth of the river Salex, some nine hundred stadia, and beyond that point a further distance which no one can compute, because when you have passed this river Libya is a desert which no longer supports a population."

Plutarch, who refers to the "Fortunate Isles" several times in his writings, locates them firmly in the Atlantic in his vita of Sertorius. Sertorius, when struggling against a chaotic civil war in the closing years of the Roman Republic, had tidings from mariners of certain islands a few days' sail from Hispania. Additionally, from what Sertorius learned from these men, it is said that he considered retiring from Roman political life altogether to pursue these islands, but future conflicts prevented him from doing so:

Here he met some sailors recently arrived from the Atlantic islands, two in number, separated only by a narrow channel, and 10,000 stades from the African coast; these are called the Isles of the Blessed. Rains fall there seldom, and these are moderate, but for the most part they enjoy gentle breezes carrying dew, and so the islands not only provide soil rich for plowing and planting, but also bear fruit that grows on its own, abundant and sweet, to feed the inhabitants who enjoy leisure without toil or trouble. With temperate seasons that change only moderately, the islands possess a pleasant climate. The north and east winds blowing out from that region over the long distance dissipate in the open space and lose their force, while the south and west winds passing over the ocean bring occasional gentle showers from the sea, but often bring cool to the moist, clear weather and gently nourish the soil. And so even among the barbarians a firm belief prevails that here are the Elysian Fields and the abode of the blessed, of which Homer sang.

Pliny the Elder's Natural History adds to the obligatory description—that they "abound in fruit and birds of every kind"—the unexpected detail that, "[t]hese islands, however, are greatly annoyed by the putrefying bodies of monsters, which are constantly thrown up by the sea".

Juba II (52/50 BCE—CE 23), King of Numidia and Mauretania, adds his observation of its geographical location. He states that the Fortunate Islands are positioned to the south in a nearly westerly direction, distanced from the Iles Purpuraires (Purple Islands) by a measurement of six hundred and twenty-five miles, the sailing made for a measurement of two hundred and fifty miles due west, then three hundred and seventy-five due east. The first island is stated to be named Ombrios, containing its mountains a lake and some trees, appearing similar to giant fennel. The second island is Junonia, stated to have nothing distinct besides a small temple of stone and a smaller island of the same name in its immediate vicinity. The third is Capraria, inhabited by an infestation of large lizards. According to Juba also is Ninguaria, which is positioned in sight of the Fortunate Islands, and has received its name from its perpetual snows. Situated beside it is Canaria, inhabited by dogs of large sizes, with traces of buildings notably present as well. Although all these islands are fertile, Canaria produces caryota in great quantity, in addition to pine nuts, honey, papyrus, and the fish silurus.

The Isles are mentioned in Book II of A True History by the Greek satirist Lucian of Samosata. The author makes fun of the heroes residing there by giving an account of their petty squabbles as presented to the court of the magistrate, Rhadamanthus. He goes on to describe other observations of how the residents occupy their time, using every opportunity to satirise both contemporary life and Greek mythology.

Ptolemy used these islands as the reference for the measurement of geographical longitude and they continued to play the role of defining the prime meridian through the Middle Ages.

In Book VII of the Republic, Plato writes that once a philosopher king has finished ruling and successors are in place, the philosopher king will depart for the Isles of the Blessed.

== Location ==
The Fortunate Isles have traditionally been identified with the archipelagos of the group currently known geographically as Macaronesia (Azores, Madeira, Savage Islands, Canary Islands, and Cape Verde).

Based on the ancient idea that the Oecumene from the Fortunate Isles to the capital of the Seres (in China) spanned 180° of longitude, Lucio Russo hypothesized that the Fortunate Isles were actually the Lesser Antilles, implying that there had been pre-Columbian contact with the Caribbean.

== Classical Traditions in Myths ==
=== Ireland and Bran the Explorer ===
Similarly, there is another legend told in Celtic mythology, where Bran, son of Febal, is approached by a mystery woman and is told of the Isles of the Blest through a poem:

A Branch of the apple-tree from Emain
I bring, like those one knows;
Twigs of white silver are on it,
Crystal brows with blossoms.
There is a distant isle,
Around which sea-horses glisten;
A fair course against the white-swelling surge,
Four feet uphold it.
Unknown is wailing or treachery
In the familiar cultivated land.
There is nothing rough or harsh,
But sweet music striking the ear.
Wealth, treasure of every hue,
Are in Ciuin, a beauty of freshness,
Listening to sweet music,
Drinking the best of wine.

It is said that there are "thrice fifty" of these isles, located west of Ireland; Bran and his company set out towards them, encountering the Isle of Joy, where one member is left behind. Following this, they arrive at the Isle of Women, where Bran is drawn to shore by the Isle's queen. Supposedly, Bran and company remain on this specific isle until they are no longer fascinated and are seized by longing to return home. When they return, they are informed that they have been gone for centuries, and as Bran recounts the voyage, it is said that he disappears thereafter from "mortal ken".

== See also ==
- Immram, mythical Irish voyages in the Atlantic
- Thule
- Macaronesia
- The nymphs of the far west, the Hesperides
