= Iambulus =

Iambulus or Jambulus (Ancient Greek: Ἰάμβουλος, Iamboulos) was an ancient Greek merchant and the likely author of a utopian novel about the strange forms and figures of the inhabitants of the "Islands of the Sun". His name seems not to be Greek and reveals a Semitic or an Arabic origin.

His work did not survive in the original, but only as a fragment in Diodorus Siculus' Bibliotheca historica (II, 55–60). Diodorus, who seems only to have transcribed lambulus in his description of the Indians, relates that lambulus was made a slave by the Ethiopians, and sent by them to a happy island in the eastern seas, where he acquired his knowledge. The whole account, however, has the appearance of a fiction, and the description which lambulus gives of the east, which he had probably never seen, consists of absurd statements.

Iambulus is mentioned in the satirical novel A True Story by Lucian as writing "a lot of surprising things about the Atlantic Ocean". He is listed in the preface as an inspiration. Lucian remarks that Iambulus's stories were obviously untrue, but not unpleasant for that. A True Story is presented as a satire of such accounts as those of Iambulus and Ctesias, an author who wrote an account of India in the 5th century BC that was similarly full of wild claims, such as human beings with one gigantic foot they used as umbrellas against a sun far more hot than was known in the West.

== See also ==
- The City of the Sun
- True History
- Gulliver's Travels
