= Itinerarius of Johannes Witte de Hese =

Opening of the Itinerarius from a Latin manuscript of 1462–1480, now in the library of the University of Giessen.

The Itinerarius of Johannes Witte de Hese is a short medieval Latin travel account from around 1400. Although it purports to be a true account of the author's travels, it is a fictional account of an imaginary voyage in the same tradition as John Mandeville's Travels. The title Itinerarius comes from the first printed edition from around 1490. Johannes Witte de Hese is the name given to the author in the earliest surviving manuscript, but he is not known from any other source and the name may be an invention. He describes himself as a priest of the diocese of Utrecht who was in Jerusalem in May 1389 before setting off on his two years of travel around the world.

By the middle of the 15th century, the Itinerarius had been translated into Middle Dutch.

== Sources ==
- Westrem, Scott D. (1985). A Critical Edition of Johannes Witte de Hese's "Itinerarius": The Middle Dutch Text, an English Translation, and Commentary, together with an Introduction to European Accounts of Travel to the East, 1200–1400 (PhD diss.). Northwestern University . ProQuest 8511875
- Westrem, Scott D. (2001). Broader Horizons: A Study of Johannes Witte de Hese's Itinerarius and Medieval Travel Narratives. Medieval Academy of America.
