= Industrial Party (China) =

Technocratic ideological grouping in China

In China, Industrial Party (simplified Chinese: 工业党; traditional Chinese: 工業黨; pinyin: gōngyè dǎng, also translated as Industrialist or Technologist) refers to a group of Chinese thinkers and Chinese people who support scientific thinking, advanced technology, techno-nationalism, and economic growth, and reject liberalism, universal values, and free market economics. In a narrow sense, the term could also refer to the fan culture of Illumine Lingao, a Chinese time-travel novel.

== History ==
In the 1990s, a great debate erupted in Chinese intellectual circles between the New Left, liberal, and neoconservative schools in the face of China's rapidly changing economic situation. As the debate spread to the Internet, and as a reaction to the liberalist tendency, Chinese cybernationalists with science and engineering academic backgrounds gathered in online forums. A debate progressed in late 2004 and early 2005 by Chinese thinkers Chen Jing and Zhong Qing, which marked a precursor to the term.

Regarded as a "tabletop role-playing game novel" covering repeated descriptions and analysis of the possibilities of industrial development, Illumine Lingao further paved the path for the rise of the Industrial Party.

In 2011, a number of Chinese nationalistic thinkers, including Wang Xiaodong and Song Xiaojun, argued only an improvement in means of production and industrial technology could transcend differences between political parties and ideologies. In one post of Wang's blog, "China's Industrialization Will Determine the Fate of China and the World: The 'Industrial Party' versus the 'Sentimental Party'" (Chinese: 中国的工业化将决定中国与世界的命运——兼论“工业党”对决“情怀党”, later published in a magazine), he analyzed that:

Here, I would like to introduce another dimension: the Industrial Party and the Sentimental Party. [...] The present situation in China requires understanding this other dimension—the Industrial Party and the Sentimental Party. According to Song Xiaojun, these terms were invented by a lady reporter at a major newspaper. Members of the Industrial Party, as the name implies, are inclined toward further industrialization. In terms of their intellect, they are more suited to work in industry. That does not mean that everyone in the Industrial Party is an engineer, since I consider myself a member but do not work in industry. People in the Industrial Party are similar to scientists or engineers in the way they think about things. That is not to say that they are without emotion. They have their own sentimentality. When I saw the fourth-generation fighter take flight, I did not break down and sob as some young people did, but a tear did come to my eye. That is emotion, but it is the emotion of the Industrial Party.

Wang's essay is often considered to have formally introduced the term "Industrial Party", although Wang himself said that "this expression was invented by a female reporter of a mainstream newspaper". One year later, "Ma Qianzu" (a pen name) and four other people born in the 1980s co-authored and published The Big Goal: Our Political Negotiation with this World (Chinese: 《大目标：我们与这个世界的政治协商》), which is regarded as the manifesto of the Industrial Party. The same year, Ma and some other industrialists joined guancha.cn, and tried to use the website as a platform for the spread of the idea.

The Industrial Party tendency continued to rise in the 2010s. Both Liu Di's commentary on Radio Free Asia and the Initium Media have linked Liu Cixin, a famous Chinese author, and his novels to the Industrial Party.

== Positions ==
Industrial Party (simplified Chinese: 工业党; traditional Chinese: 工業黨; pinyin: gōngyè dǎng, also translated as Industrialist or Technologist) refers to a group of Chinese thinkers and Chinese people who support scientific thinking, advanced technology, techno-nationalism, and economic growth, and reject liberalism, universal values, and free market economics. The group largely supports the PRC political establishment.

The Industrial party proposes that China should achieve great power status through industrial and technological advancement. Members of the Industrial Party generally agree on the following:

- Technology determines social structure.
- Technology first.
- Socialist planned economy
- Technocracy.
- Chinese nationalism.
- Pragmatism.

A reaction to liberalism, Industrialists don't focus on political participation and democracy. Instead, they focus more on effectiveness and academic knowledge. Thus they oppose:

- Agrarianism (which they regard as musty)
- Capitalism (especially free market economics)
- Universal values (which they regard as "Western cultural infiltration")

== See also ==
- All Watched Over by Machines of Loving Grace
- Industrial Party Affair
- Rise of the Red Engineers
- Saint-Simonianism
- Technocracy movement
