= Portal fantasy =

Fantasy narratives involving travel through portals

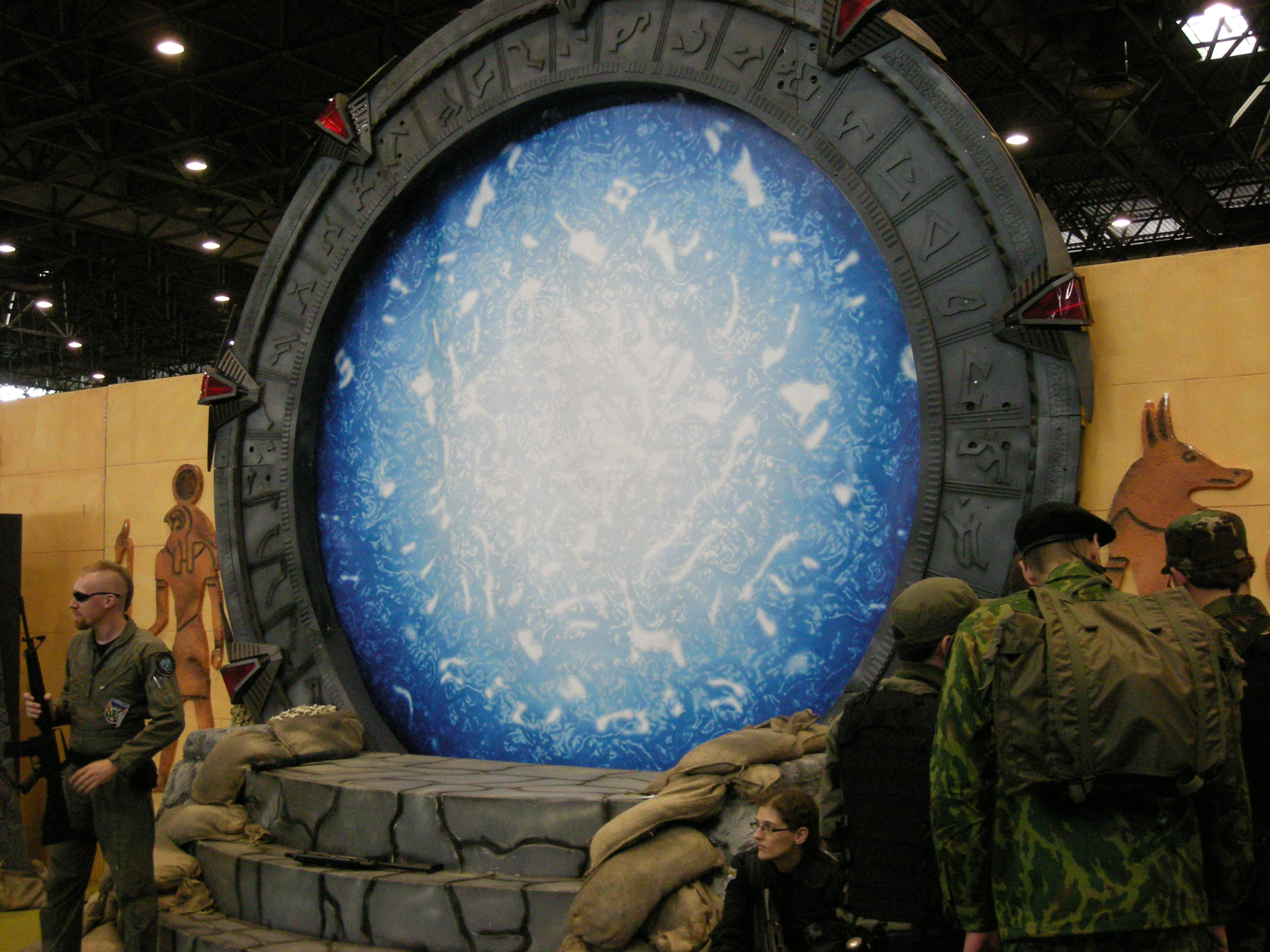
A gateway device from the Stargate franchise, made of alien advanced technology.

Portal fantasy, also called portal-quest fantasy, gateway fantasy or crossworld fantasy, is a subgenre of speculative fiction, particularly fantasy fiction and science fiction, that hinges upon the plot device in which characters enter a self-contained fantasy world through a portal, typically within a quest-based narrative that focuses on exploring and navigating that world. Portal fantasy works typically feature protagonists who enter alternate realities, explore unfamiliar landscapes, and encounter distinctive characters. Overall, portals in speculative fiction act as catalysts for narrative movement, worldbuilding, and thematic exploration.

Portals are often used as plot devices that allow characters to reach otherwise inaccessible locations instantaneously or with minimal travel time. Portals serve as versatile devices within speculative fiction, enabling exploration of power, danger, and the structure of fictional worlds, while also challenging conventional notions of travel, causality, and space. Whether natural, magical, or technological, they reflect broader concerns about power, instability, and the permeability of reality.

Since the advent of the modern novel, Alice's Adventures in Wonderland (1865) is frequently identified as one of the earliest clear examples of portal fantasy. The protagonist enters a secondary world from the real world through a rabbit-hole portal and encounters a reality governed by its own internal logic.

== Definition and characteristics ==
In fantasy literature, portal fantasy commonly uses this device to transport a protagonist from the real world into a separate fantastical realm, where the narrative introduces elements such as magic, unfamiliar environments, non-human characters, or prophetic themes. A portal is a device or phenomenon that enables travel between different locations, worlds, dimensions, or points in time, serving narrative functions such as rapid movement, interdimensional exploration, and symbolic transitions between states of existence, thereby playing a significant role in worldbuilding. Works featuring portals may focus less on the journey itself and more on the consequences of travel or the nature of the destinations reached. The function of portals in portal fantasy is often characterized by characters passing between worlds according to rules that are only partially explained. Upon entering the secondary world, characters are frequently subject to forces beyond their control, emphasizing their limited agency within the unfamiliar setting. Portals often exhibit a disproportion between their exterior and interior dimensions, with the space beyond the portal differing significantly in scale or nature from its outward appearance.

The Encyclopedia of Fantasy defines portal fantasy as a type of fantasy "in which transition between the two realms occurs regularly". Literary scholar Farah Mendlesohn has identified portal fantasy as sharing structural similarities with quest fantasy, noting that both typically involve a protagonist leaving a familiar environment and passing through a threshold into an unfamiliar world. Mendlesohn identifies portal fantasy as a genre in which characters move from the primary world into a secondary one, often for the purpose of exploration or transformation. However, Mendlesohn argues that, while portal fantasies frequently take the form of quests, not all do, defining the genre as a narrative in which a fantastical world is entered through a portal that serves as a boundary between distinct realms. Building on this framework, critics drawing on John Clute's definition of a portal as a liminal structure or threshold have described portals as identifiable transitions that transport characters to another world, time, or reality.

Scholars have also noted distinctions between portal fantasy and portal narratives in science fiction or horror. In fantasy, portals are often depicted as one-way passages, with magic remaining confined to the secondary world. By contrast, science fiction and horror portals frequently allow threats or forces to return to the originating world, exposing it to danger. This difference has been used to explain why portal fantasy often features radically altered physical laws, whereas science fiction portals more commonly relocate characters to another region of the same universe. Early literary precedents cited by scholars include mythological and religious journeys to other realms, although these are often regarded as allegorical rather than literal portal narratives. Portals serve multiple narrative purposes – The first is communication between worlds, enabling the exchange of information or influence across realities. The second is transformation, as characters often undergo personal change. The third and most prominent function is travel, allowing characters to bypass conventional physical constraints. Characters who encounter portals are often portrayed as having been selected in some way, suggesting that portals function not merely as passages but as mechanisms of narrative choice and initiation. Despite its long literary history, portal fantasy has declined in popularity within contemporary publishing.

== Forms and types ==
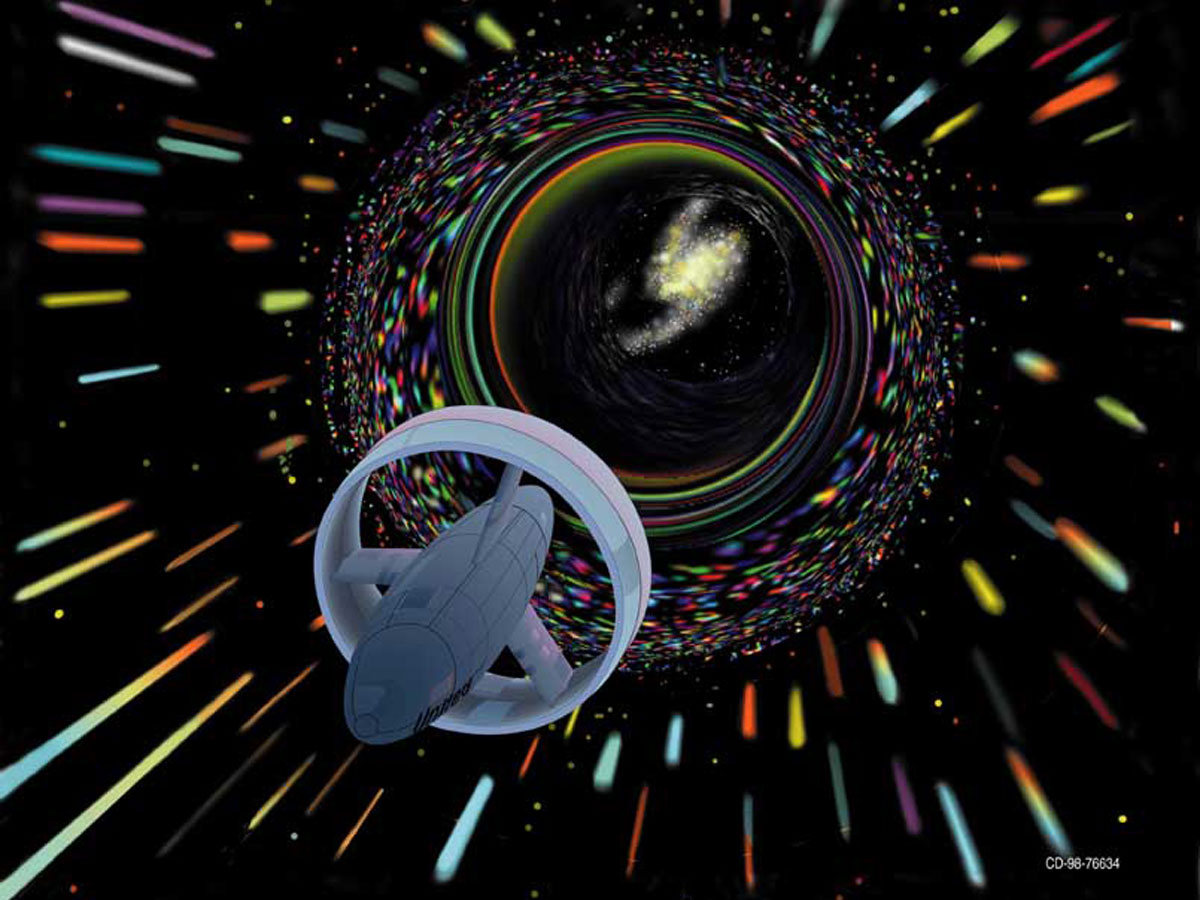
Illustration of wormhole travel

Portals vary widely in form and function – common examples include doors and gates (including portals), mirrors, tunnels, labyrinths, screens, wardrobes, wormholes and naturally occurring phenomena such as whirlwinds or caves, or they may be metaphorical or conceptual. Less commonly, portals themselves may be portable objects, such as amulets, rings, or books. Portals may be situated in a wide range of locations, from small or hidden spaces to monumental structures or entire cities that function as centres of multiple intersections. Portals are sometimes portrayed as so dangerous or destabilizing that their use is deliberately suppressed. In contrast, portals can also serve as instruments of domination. In some narratives, a portal becomes perceptible only when the boundary between worlds is sufficiently concentrated, sometimes detectable only by characters with special abilities.

Despite their differing appearances, portals generally share the characteristic of connecting two distinct spaces in ways not normally possible within the established rules of the fictional world. In some narratives, portals occur naturally and exist independently of human intervention. These portals are often unpredictable and difficult to control, posing risks to those who encounter them. By contrast, artificial portals are typically created through advanced technology, magic, or scientific experimentation. In science fiction, artificial portals may malfunction or produce unintended consequences, highlighting the dangers of overreaching technological ambition. Science fiction frequently portrays portals as technological constructs used for interstellar or interdimensional travel. The psychological effects of portals recur across speculative fiction, where they are often associated with disorientation, loss of identity, or unintended consequences. Many portals are guarded by rules, conditions, or prohibitions, and passing through them frequently involves a test or trial.

Fantasy literature frequently presents portals as magical or mystical gateways, often guarded or restricted. Horror, supernatural fiction and dark fantasy narratives frequently use portals to introduce threats from other dimensions. In such works, portals may allow monstrous entities to enter the primary world, blurring the boundary between the familiar and the unknown. The presence of portals in these genres often underscores themes of invasion, loss of control, and existential fear. Effective use of portals in fiction requires consistent internal rules governing their operation and limitations. Portals often serve as metaphors for transformation, discovery, or the unknown, while also functioning as practical mechanisms for expanding fictional universes. Their continued prevalence across genres reflects their versatility as both narrative tools and symbolic elements. The presence of portals also shapes social and political structures within fictional settings. Characters who encounter portals are often portrayed as having been selected in some way, suggesting that portals function not merely as passages but as mechanisms of narrative choice and initiation.

== Notable works and examples ==
Alice entering looking glass house

=== Fantasy ===
Early and influential examples of portal fantasy are found primarily in fantasy literature, such as The Door in the Wall (1911) by H. G. Wells, The Story of the Amulet by Edith Nesbit, Alice's Adventures in Wonderland and Through the Looking-Glass by Lewis Carroll, The Wonderful Wizard of Oz by L. Frank Baum, Peter Pan by J. M. Barrie, The Chronicles of Narnia by C. S. Lewis and The Chronicles of Thomas Covenant by Stephen R. Donaldson. John Carter of Mars, beginning with Edgar Rice Burroughs' A Princess of Mars (1912), is a portal fantasy in which an Earthman is transported to the alien world of Barsoom. In early narratives, portals frequently serve as gateways to alternative worlds that operate according to unfamiliar or illogical rules. The Harry Potter series contains portal fantasy elements, featuring multiple "crossings" between the ordinary world (the Muggle world) and magical realms, most notably Platform 9¾, which serves as a portal to Hogwarts and its magical universe.

In The Dark Tower series by Stephen King, portals take many forms and are closely tied to the structure of the multiverse. In Stephen King's The Jaunt (1981), instantaneous teleportation results in madness when consciousness is preserved during transit, suggesting that portals may carry severe risks. Beginning with The Gunslinger (1982), King establishes a recurring motif of doorways and thresholds that allow characters to pass between worlds. In The Drawing of the Three (1987), Roland Deschain encounters doors emerging from the sea, through which he enters the minds of individuals from other realities. Doors and gateways recur throughout King's wider fiction. Examples include the doors in The Talisman (1984) and the dimensional passageways in Insomnia (1994). In the show Once Upon a Time, magic users have the ability to teleport themselves and others in clouds of magical smoke. Other fantasy examples include The Hollowing (1993) by Robert Holdstock, Jumanji, Fairyland, Stardust (2007), The Magicians, Coraline by Neil Gaiman, His Dark Materials by Philip Pullman and The Neverending Story by Michael Ende.

=== Science fiction ===
Early "portal" appearances in science fiction include A. E. van Vogt's novella Secret Unattainable (July 1942, Astounding), a radio episode of Space Patrol that aired October 25, 1952 (in which it was called a "cycloplex" or a "hole in space"), and Robert A. Heinlein's Tunnel in the Sky (1955) and its "Ramsbotham jump". In 2001: A Space Odyssey, Arthur C. Clarke uses the term "Star Gate" for the large monolith "sentinel" TMA-2, which is a classic stargate portal to another part of the universe.

In science fiction film and television, wormholes in Star Trek, the hyperspace and Stargate systems in Stargate SG-1, and artificial gateways in Doctor Who are often portrayed as experimental or unstable, reinforcing the idea that technological portals carry significant risks. In addition to these works, Deep Space Nine (1993–1999), The Matrix (1999), Sliders (1995–1997) and Farscape: The Peacekeeper Wars (2004) have also been described as science fiction works incorporating elements of portal fantasy.

The Stargate franchise centers on an artificial portal device that connects distant planets through a fixed network, allowing for large-scale exploration and interaction between civilizations. The Stargate series also explores the sociopolitical and cultural consequences of portal travel, including military conflict, colonialism, and cooperation between worlds. Over time, the franchise expands its scope to include parallel universes and higher planes of existence, further developing the concept of portals as tools for both physical and metaphysical exploration. In Star Trek, natural spatial anomalies such as wormholes and gateways enable faster-than-light travel but are often unstable or unreliable. The Thor film series incorporates portal fantasy elements through its depiction of travel between Earth and the mythological realm of Asgard via the Bifröst. Christopher Nolan's Inception (2010) can be interpreted as a science-fiction variant of portal fantasy, in which technology replaces the magical portal and the dream world replaces the traditional fantasy realm.

=== Video games ===
In interactive media, portals are also used to explore perception and space, such as in Legend of Zelda: A Link to the Past, Ni no Kuni, Kingdoms of Amalur: Reckoning, Final Fantasy, Myst, EarthBound, Ocarina of Time and Kingdom Hearts. In the video game Portal (2007), players can see and interact with themselves across connected gateways, while Portal 2 (2011) expands this concept by using portals as a metaphor for navigating layered histories and environments. The portal gun allows characters to bypass conventional obstacles, reinforcing the idea that portals function as shortcuts that reshape narrative logic. Although Super Mario Bros. appears simple in its linear design, the game has been noted for its "surprising amount of depth and spatial complexity," largely due to the presence of secret areas and warp zones scattered throughout its levels.

== See also ==
- Isekai – Japanese fantasy subgenre about travel to another world
- Accidental travel – Fantasy subgenre about being transferred to another world or time
- Imaginary voyage – Fictitious narrative written as a travel account
- Dream world (plot device) – Fantasy about worlds accessed through dreams
- Chuanyue – Chinese fantasy about crossing into another era
