= Tommaso Campanella =

Italian philosopher, theologian, astrologer, and poet (1568–1639)

Tommaso Campanella OP
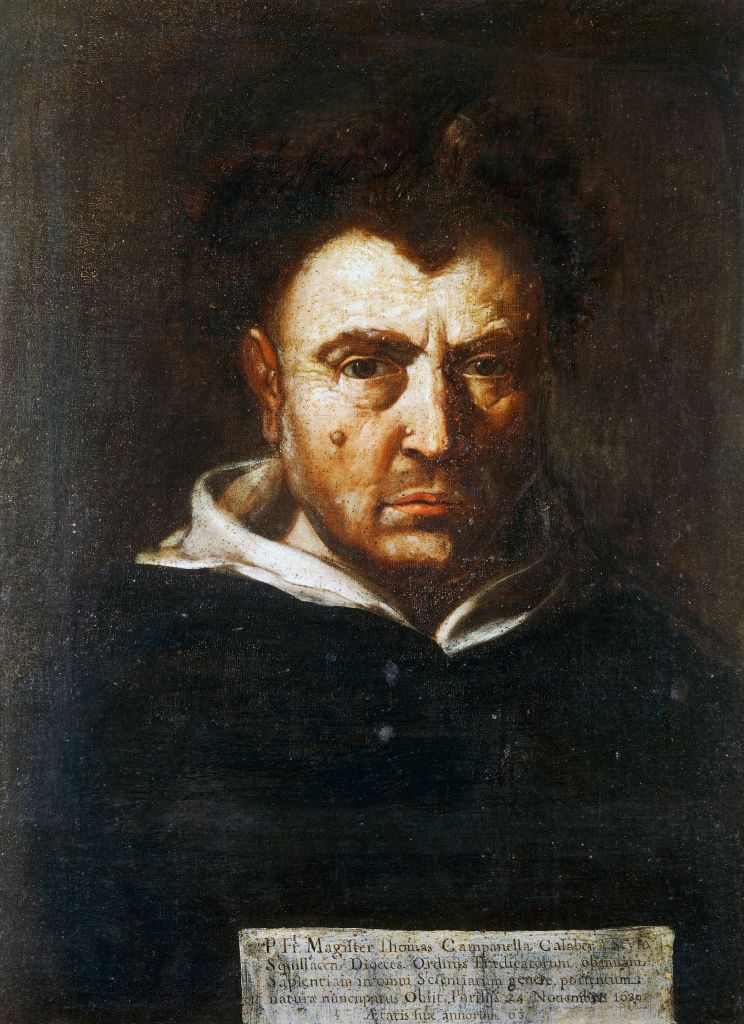
- Portrait of Campanella by Francesco Cozza
- Born: Giovanni Domenico Campanella; 5 September 1568; Stignano, Calabria, Kingdom of Naples
- Died: 21 May 1639 (aged 70); Paris, Kingdom of France
- Occupations: Philosopher; theologian; astrologer; poet
- Known for: Utopian political philosophy

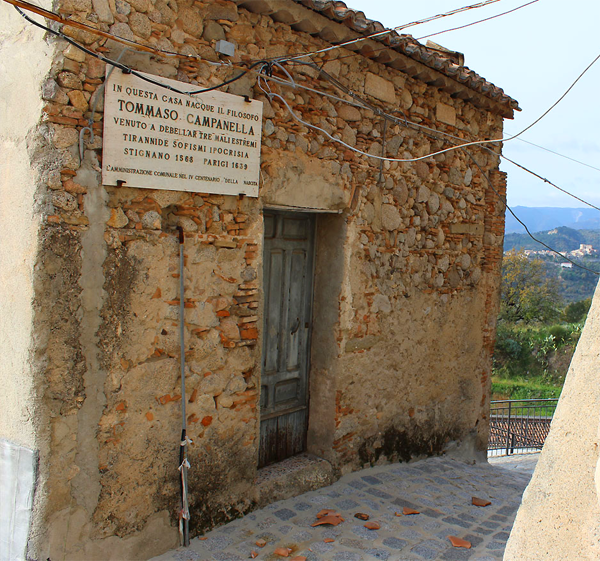
Tommaso Campanella's house at Stignano

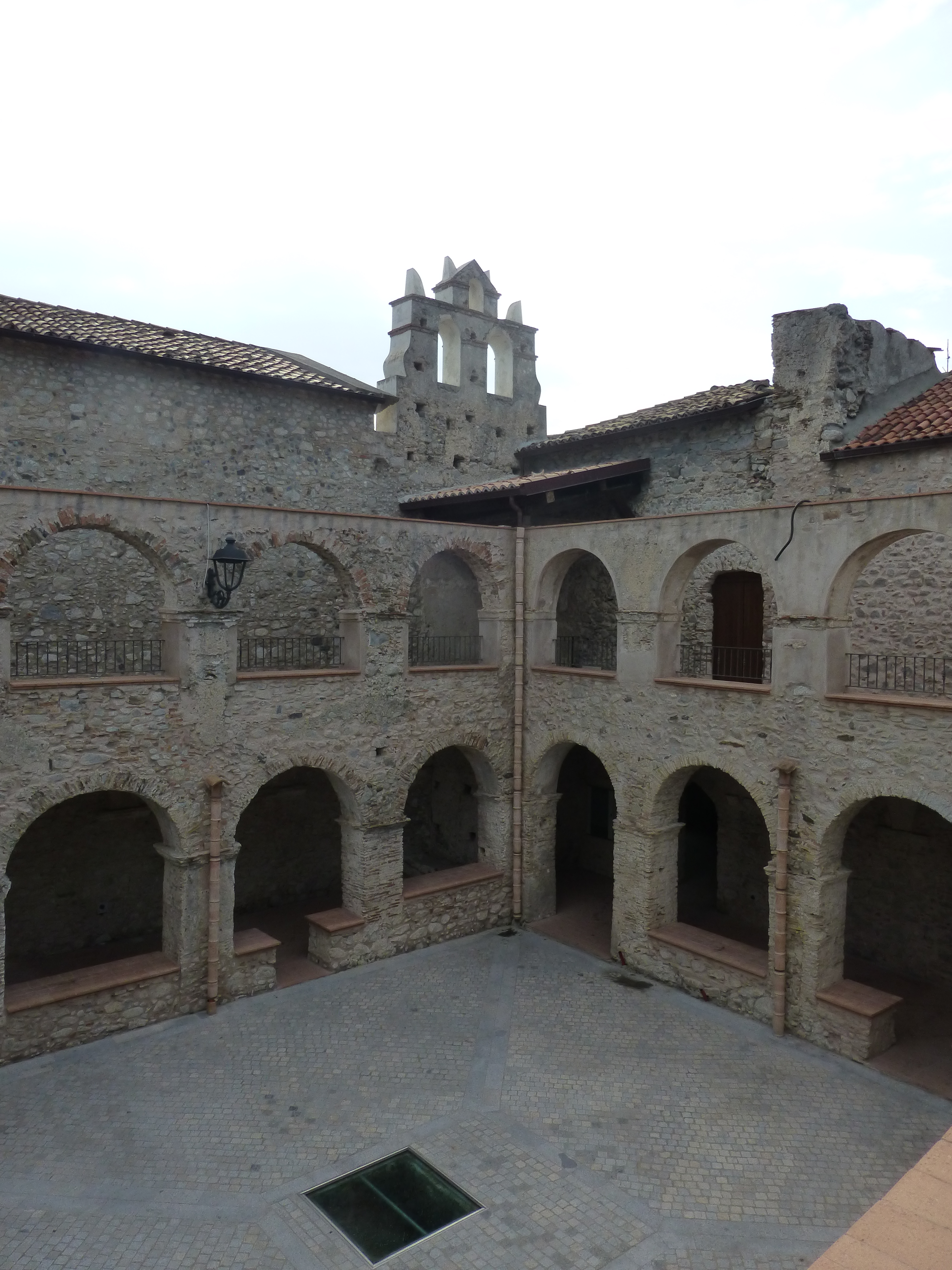
Former Dominican convent at Placanica

Tommaso Campanella (Italian: [tomˈmaːzo kampaˈnɛlla]; 5 September 1568 – 21 May 1639), baptized Giovanni Domenico Campanella, was an Italian Dominican friar, philosopher, theologian, astrologer, and poet.

Campanella was prosecuted by the Roman Inquisition for heresy in 1594 and was confined to house arrest for two years. Accused of conspiring against the Spanish rulers of Calabria in 1599, he was tortured and sent to prison, where he spent 27 years. He wrote his most significant works during this time, including The City of the Sun, a utopia describing an egalitarian theocratic society where property is held in common.

== Biography ==
Born into poverty in Stignano, in the province of Reggio di Calabria in Calabria, southern Italy, Campanella was a child prodigy. Son of an illiterate cobbler, he entered the Dominican Order before the age of fourteen, taking the name of fra' Tommaso in honour of Thomas Aquinas. He studied theology and philosophy with several masters.

Early on, he became disenchanted with the Aristotelian orthodoxy and attracted by the empiricism of Bernardino Telesio (1509–1588), who taught that knowledge is sensation and that all things in nature possess sensation. Campanella wrote his first work, Philosophia sensibus demonstrata ("Philosophy demonstrated by the senses"), published in 1592, in defence of Telesio.

In 1590 he was in Naples where he was initiated in astrology; astrological speculations would become a constant feature in his writings. Campanella's heterodox views, especially his opposition to the authority of Aristotle, brought him into conflict with the ecclesiastical authorities. Denounced to the Roman Inquisition, he was arrested in Padua in 1594 and cited before the Holy Office in Rome, he was confined in a convent until 1597.

After his liberation, Campanella returned to Calabria, where he was accused of leading a conspiracy against the Spanish rule in his hometown of Stilo. Campanella's aim was to establish a society based on the community of goods and wives, for on the basis of the prophecies of Joachim of Fiore and his own astrological observations, he foresaw the advent of the Age of the Spirit in the year 1600. Betrayed by two of his fellow conspirators, he was captured in 1599 and incarcerated in Naples, where he was tortured on the rack. Even from the confinement of the jail, Campanella managed to influence the intellectual history of the early seventeenth century, by maintaining epistolary contacts with European philosophers and scientists, Neapolitan cultural circles, and Caravaggio's commissioners. Finally, Campanella made a full confession and would have been put to death had he not feigned madness and set his cell on fire. He was tortured further, a total of seven times. Crippled and ill, Campanella was sentenced to life imprisonment.

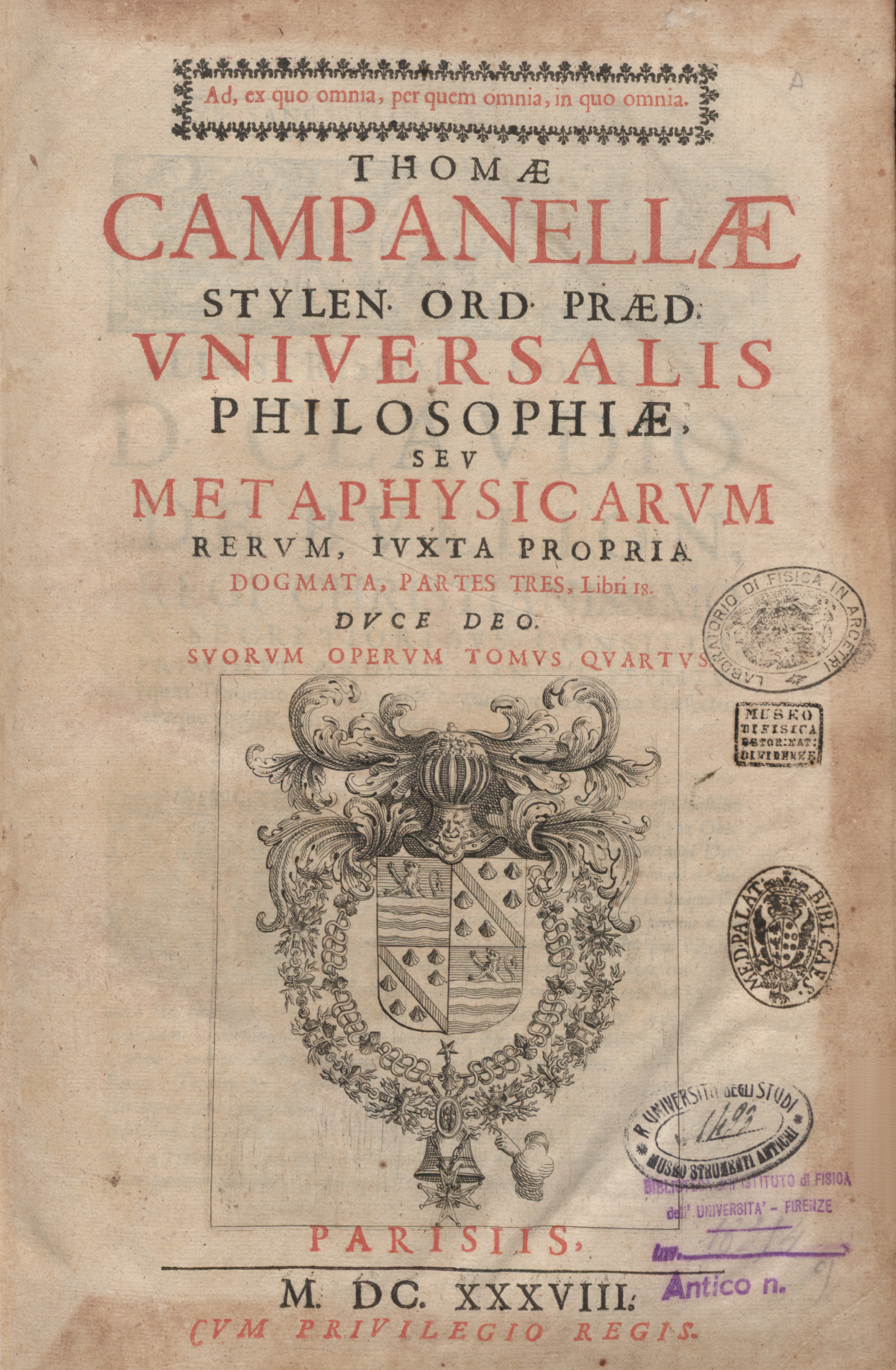
Metaphysica, 1638

Campanella spent twenty-seven years imprisoned in Naples, in various fortresses. During his detention, he wrote his most important works: The Monarchy of Spain (1600), Political Aphorisms (1601), Atheismus triumphatus (Atheism Conquered, 1605–1607), Quod reminiscetur (1606?), Metafisica (1609–1623), Theologia (1613–1624), and his most famous work, The City of the Sun (originally written in Italian in 1602; published in Latin in Frankfurt (1623) and later in Paris (1638).

His work The Monarchy of the Spain was a long letter to King Philip II, whom Campanella claimed to be the main protector of Christendom, advising him on how found a universal monarchy as his father Charles had attempted to achieve. He instructs Philip to seize, acquire or ally with all the Christian realms in order to defeat the Ottoman Empire and the Protestant nations.

He defended Galileo Galilei in Galileo's first trial with his work The Defense of Galileo (written in 1616, published in 1622). In 1632, before Galileo's second trial, Campanella wrote to Galileo:

To my great disgust I have heard that wrathful theologians of the Congregation aim to prohibit the Dialogues of Your Excellency, and [that] no one will be present who understands mathematics or recondite things. Be aware that while Your Excellency does state that it was appropriate to prohibit the theory of the earth's motion, you are not obliged to believe that the reasons of those who contradicted you are good. This is a theological rule, and is proved by the second Council of Nicaea which decreed that Angelorum imagines depingi debent, quam'am vere corporei sunt (Images of angels must be depicted as they are in the flesh): while the decree is valid, the reasoning behind it is not, since all scholars today say angels are incorporeal. There are many other fundamental reasons. I fear violence from people who do not understand this. Our Pope makes a lot of noise against this and speaks as the Pope, but you haven't heard about that, nor can think about it. In my opinion Your Excellency should write to the Grand Duke of Tuscany, that since they are putting Dominicans, Jesuits, Theatines, and secular priests who are against your books in this council, they should also admit Father Castelli and me.

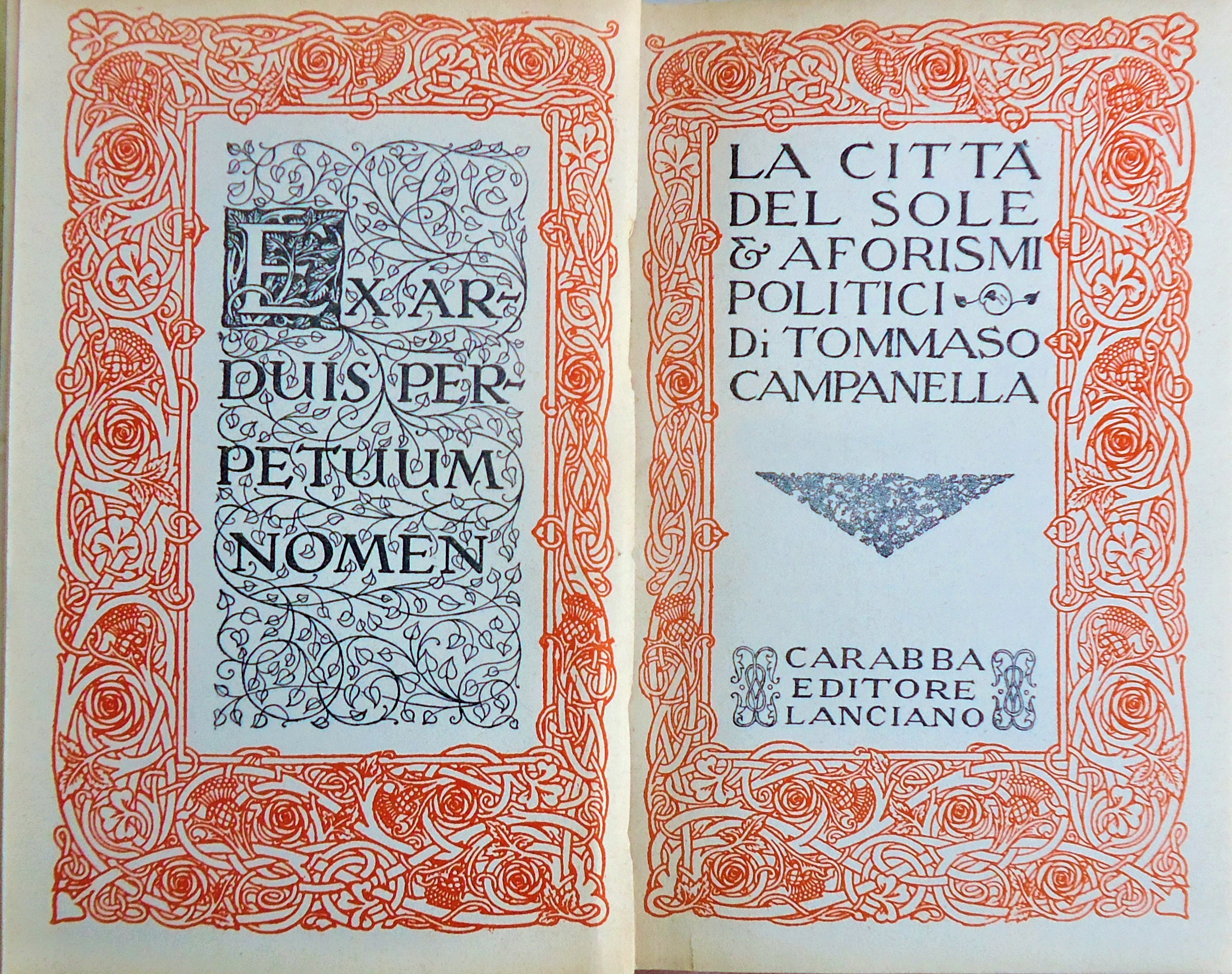
Tommaso Campanella, La Città del Sole, Carabba, 1915

Campanella was finally released from prison in 1626, through Pope Urban VIII, who personally interceded on his behalf with Philip IV of Spain. Taken to Rome and held for a time by the Holy Office, Campanella was restored to full liberty in 1629 as Urban badly needed Campanella's magical skills to protect him from the dangers of two upcoming eclipses. The Pope's enemies thought they could take advantage of his credulity, and they confidently predicted that the eclipses in 1628 and 1630 surely heralded the Pope's demise. Campanella put into effect the natural magic practices described in his short treatise De siderali fato vitando (How To Avoid the Fate Dictated by the Stars). The Pope survived and, in return for Campanella's help, allowed the magician to set up a school in Rome to preach his ideas, while ignoring his blatant heresies. He lived for five years in Rome, where he was Urban's advisor in astrological matters.

In 1634, a new conspiracy in Calabria, led by one of his followers, threatened fresh troubles. With the aid of Cardinal Barberini and the French Ambassador de Noailles, he fled to France, where he was received at the court of Louis XIII with marked favour. Protected by Cardinal Richelieu and granted a pension by the king, he spent the rest of his days in the convent of Saint-Honoré in Paris. His last work was a poem celebrating the birth of the future Louis XIV (Ecloga in portentosam Delphini nativitatem).

Campanella's De sensu rerum et magia (1620) partly inspired the first fully-fledged it-narrative in English, Charles Gildon's The Golden Spy (1709).

The historian John Headley described Campanella as "a man who strove to destabilize the regnant forces of what he identified as tyranny, sophistry, and hypocrisy and to shake the world into a new order."

Independent scholar Andrew Manns has shown that the English pamphleteer and parliamentarian William Prynne distorted Campanella's political ideas in order to promote anti-Catholic propaganda during the English Civil War.

== Works ==
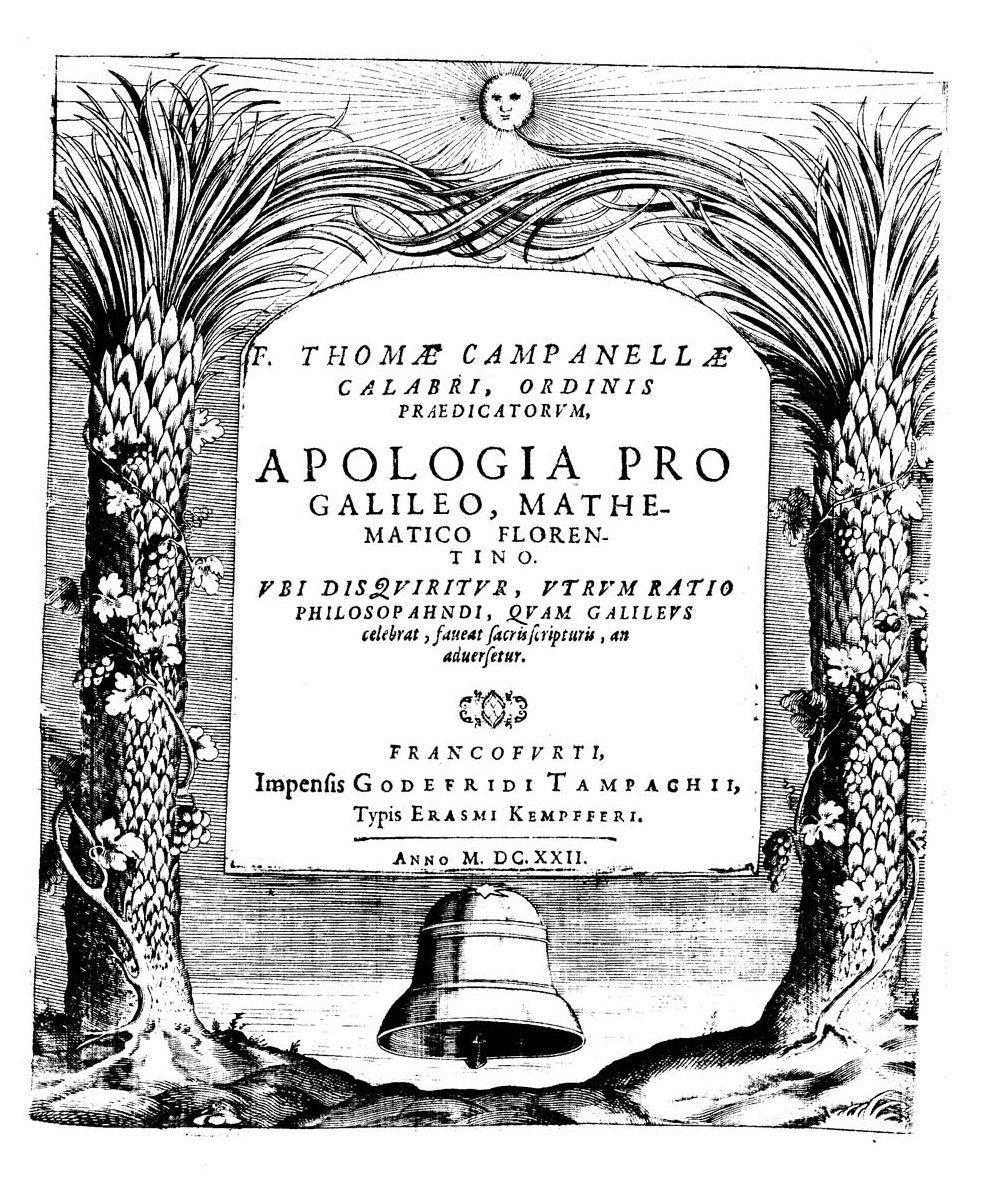
Apologia pro Galileo, 1622

- Philosophia sensibus demonstrata, 1591
- De monarchia hispanica discursus (1601)
- Monarchia Messiae, 1605
- Prodromus philosophiae instaurandae, 1617
- Apologia pro Galileo (in Latin). Frankfurt am Main: Gottfried Tampach. 1622.
- La città del sole, 1602 (Latin Civitas solis, 1623)
- Atheismus triumphatus, 1631, Paris 1636
- Medicinalium libri (in Latin). Lugduni: ex officina Ioannis Pillehotte : sumptibus Ioannis Caffin, & Francisci Plaignard. 1635.
- Metaphysica (in Latin). Vol. 1. Paris. 1638.
- Metaphysica (in Latin). Vol. 2. Paris. 1638.
- Metaphysica (in Latin). Vol. 3. Paris. 1638.
- Poesie. Bari: Laterza. 1915.

== See also ==
- Millennialism
- Utopian fiction
