= All-Russian Thermal Engineering Institute =

Thermal engineering institute in Russia

Coordinates: 55.7038°N 37.6482°E

The All-Russia Thermal Engineering Institute was an organisation founded by the Soviet of Labor and Defense “for the purpose of systematic studying and working-out the vital practical issues in heat engineering and for solving related technical and economic problems, as well as for training high-skilled specialists” on July 13, 1921. The first director was Leonid Ramzin.
