= Industrial Party Trial =

1930 Soviet show trial

Leonid Ramzin testifies during the trial, "confessing" to ultimately false accusations.

The Industrial Party Trial (November 25 – December 7, 1930) (Russian: Процесс Промпартии, lit. 'Trial of the Prompartiya') was a show trial in which several Soviet scientists and economists were accused and convicted of plotting a coup against the government of the Soviet Union.

== History ==
=== Background ===
Nikolai Krylenko, deputy People's Commissar (minister) of Justice, assistant Prosecutor General of the RSFSR and a prominent Bolshevik, prosecuted the case. The presiding judge was Andrey Vyshinsky, later Krylenko's opponent who became notorious as the prosecutor at the Moscow Trials in 1936–1938.

The defendants were a group of notable Soviet economists and engineers, including Leonid Ramzin, Peter Osadchy, Nikolai Charnovsky, Alexander Fedotov, Victor Larichev, Vladimir Ochkin, Ksenofont Sitnin, Ivan Kalinnikov, and Sergei Kupriyanov. They stood accused of having formed an anti-Soviet "Union of Engineers' Organisations" or Prompartiya ("Industrial Party") and of having tried to wreck the Soviet industry and transport in 1926–1930.

In a related development, a number of prominent members of the Soviet Academy of Sciences (Yevgeny Tarle, Sergei Platonov, Nikolay Likhachov, Sergei Bakhrushin, etc.) were arrested in 1930. They were mentioned during the "Industrial Party" trial as co-conspirators. However, no subsequent trial took place and they were quietly exiled to remote areas of the country for a few years.

=== Accusations against the "wreckers" ===
The Industrial Party Trial was the first post-NEP trial in which the defendants were accused of plotting a coup against the Soviet regime. The plot was supposedly hatched by emigre Russian industrialists in Paris, and allegedly involved the governments of France, England and some smaller countries like Latvia and Estonia. For participating in the coup France would supposedly be rewarded with parts of Ukraine while the English would get a share in the Caucasus oil. Upon the arrival of the invasion forces the defendants would sabotage Soviet industry and create chaos in the transportation networks (charges of this kind were to become standard in later show trials of the 1930s). The trial was also notable in that it was the first Soviet show trial at which the defendants "confessed" their supposed crimes, including co-operating with the prime minister of France Raymond Poincaré. The latter had to issue a public refutation, published in Pravda, which was presented at the trial as an additional "proof" by the prosecution.

The prosecution stated that "the Industrial Party consisted of the top old engineering-technical intelligentsia, of major specialists and professors, who held privileged positions during the capitalist regime". According to the prosecution, all of the organization's members had been raised in the bourgeois environment and hence were alien to the Soviet system, which served to reinforce an important point of contemporary Soviet propaganda.

It was also alleged that Indparty wreckers had deviously moved beyond direct, crude, easily recognizable sabotage to wrecking in the areas of planning and resource distribution. Virtually any conceivable course of action could be construed as wrecking: for example the engineers' decision to invest in a particular area could be construed as wrecking by withholding resources from other vital areas, while by the same token their decision to not invest could also be construed as wrecking: the opportunity cost of any decision could be used to indicate guilt. In other words, the engineers were made scapegoats for well known economic problems in various areas of Soviet industry.

The trial was a refinement of the Shakhty Trial in 1928 and an important precursor to the Moscow Trials of the late 1930s. In one of those minor glitches that would plague later trials, Ramzin was accused of having plotted with Russian emigre industrialist Pavel Ryabushinsky in 1928, even though Ryabushinsky had died in 1924.

=== Verdict and follow-up ===
A Soviet poster showing the 'Prompartiya' unmasked as spies and wreckers led by Western imperialists.

On December 7, five defendants were given the death sentence, which was commuted to long prison terms, while other defendants were sentenced to different terms in prison.

During his imprisonment, Ramzin was allowed to continue working. He was amnestied in 1932 and eventually showered with Soviet awards (the 1943 Stalin Prize, the Order of Lenin and the Order of the Red Banner of Labour) for his scientific work, especially the Ramzin straight-flow boiler. In February 1936 some other defendants were also pardoned. Two years later, in January 1938, the prosecutor, Nikolai Krylenko, was arrested and shot during the Great Purge.

== See also ==
- Alexander Bogdanov
- Industrial Party (China)
- Metro-Vickers Affair
- Pandora's Box (British TV series)
- Shakhty Trial
- Technocratic movement
- Tectology

== Notes ==
- See Volume 21 of the Great Soviet Encyclopedia, New York; 1978.
