= A True Story =

2nd-century AD work by Lucian of Samosata

- Illustration from 1894 by William Strang depicting a battle scene from Book One of Lucian of Samosata's A True Story
- Author: Lucian of Samosata
- Language: Greek
- Genre: Satire, Fantasy, Science fiction
- Publication date: 2nd century AD
- Publication place: Syria, Roman Empire

A True Story (Ancient Greek: Ἀληθῆ διηγήματα, Alēthē diēgēmata; Latin: Vera Historia or Latin: Verae Historiae), also translated as True History, is a long novella or short novel written in the second century AD by the Syrian author Lucian of Samosata. The novel is a satire of outlandish tales that had been reported in ancient sources, particularly those that presented fantastic or mythical events as if they were true. It is Lucian's best-known work.

It is the earliest known work of fiction to include travel to outer space, alien lifeforms, and interplanetary warfare. It has been described as "the first known text that could be called science fiction". However, the work does not fit into typical literary genres: its multilayered plot and its characters have been interpreted as belonging to science fiction, fantasy, satire or parody, and have been the subjects of scholarly debate.

== Plot ==
The novel begins with an explanation that the story is not at all "true", and that everything in it is a complete and utter lie. The narrative begins with Lucian and his fellow travellers journeying out past the Pillars of Heracles. Blown off course by a storm, they come to an island with a river of wine filled with fish, a marker indicating that Heracles and Dionysus have travelled to this point, and trees that look like women. Shortly after leaving the island, they are caught up by a whirlwind and taken to the Moon, where they find themselves embroiled in a full-scale war between Endymion the king of the Moon and Phaethon the king of the Sun over colonization of the Morning Star. (Note: The names of the kings are based on the mythological characters Endymion and Phaethon, the lover of Selene the moon-goddess and the son of Helios the sun-god respectively.) Both armies include bizarre hybrid lifeforms. The armies of the Sun win the war by clouding over the Moon and blocking out the Sun's light. Both parties come to a peace agreement. Lucian describes life on the Moon and how it is different from life on Earth.

After returning to Earth, the adventurers are swallowed by a 200-mile-long (320 km) whale, in whose belly they discover a variety of fish-people, against whom they wage war and triumph. They kill the whale by starting a bonfire and escape by propping its mouth open. Next, they encounter a sea of milk, an island of cheese, and the Island of the Blessed. There, Lucian meets the heroes of the Trojan War, other mythical men and animals, as well as Homer and Pythagoras. They find sinners being punished, the worst of them being the ones who had written books with lies and fantasies, including Herodotus and Ctesias. After leaving the Island of the Blessed, they deliver a letter to Calypso given to them by Odysseus explaining that he wishes he had stayed with her so he could have lived eternally. They discover a chasm in the ocean, but eventually sail around it, discover a far-off continent and decide to explore it.

The book ends abruptly with Lucian stating that their future adventures will be described in the upcoming sequels, a promise which a disappointed scholiast described as "the biggest lie of all". (Note: Ancient Greek: καὶ τὸ τέλος ψευδέστατον μετὰ τῆς ἀνυποστάτου ἐπαγγελίας [Schol in Luc. VH 2.47]; "The end, with its unfounded promise, is the biggest lie.")

== Analysis ==
=== Satire ===
In one view, Lucian intended his story to be a form of literary criticism, a satire against contemporary and ancient sources which quote fantastic and mythical events as truth. He mentions the tales of Ctesias, Iambulus, and Homer and states that "what did surprise me was their supposition that nobody would notice they were lying." Many characters and events are exaggerated to ridiculous ends to mock the original tellings. As noted by classicist B.P. Reardon, "above all, it is a parody of literary 'liars' like Homer and Herodotus". Consequently, Lucian goes on to state that the story recounted in A True Story is about "things I have neither seen nor experienced nor heard tell of from anybody else; things, what is more, that do not in fact exist and could not ever exist at all. So my readers must not believe a word I say." He justifies the title by arguing that his is the only truthful mythological story ever written, inasmuch as it is the only one that admits that it is all lies. He also promises a sequel but it is not known if such a sequel existed.

=== Science fiction ===
Modern science fiction critics do not necessarily view the satirical streak of the story as conflicting with modern notions of science fiction. The defining element of science can be found in Lucian's specific and effective approach to identifying false values and misidentifications in contemporary philosophy, which was very much the general term of science then. Additionally, they point out that A True Story was written in response to another work that also contained science fictional elements, that is Antonius Diogenes' lost Of the Wonderful Things Beyond Thule, whose protagonist also reached the Moon. The estranging feeling of the story as a defining element of science fiction has also been noted:

...True Stories may properly be regarded as SF because Lucian often achieves that sense of "cognitive estrangement" which Darko Suvin has defined as the generic distinction of SF, that is, the depiction of an alternate world, radically unlike our own, but relatable to it in terms of significant knowledge.

According to Grewell, whose definition of science fiction focuses on the struggle between supposedly superior and inferior life forms, "part of the tale that qualifies it as science fiction, rather than as fantasy or imaginative fiction, involves Lucian and his seamen in a battle for territorial and colonization rights."

"The king of the inhabitants of the Sun, Phaethon," said Endymion king of the Moon, "has been at war with us for a long time now. Once upon a time I gathered together the poorest people in my kingdom and undertook to plant a colony on the Morning Star which was empty and uninhabited. Phaethon out of jealousy thwarted the colonization, meeting us halfway at the head of his dragoons. At that time we were beaten, for we were not a match for them in strength, and we retreated. Now, however, I desire to make war again and plant the colony."

The typical science fiction themes and topoi that appear in True Stories are:

- travel to outer space
- encounter with alien life-forms, including the experience of a first contact event
- interplanetary warfare and imperialism
- colonization of planets
- artificial atmosphere
- liquid air
- motif of giganticism
- creatures as products of human technology (robot theme)
- worlds working by a set of alternate 'physical' laws
- explicit desire of the protagonist for exploration and adventure

A middle position seems to be taken up by critic Kingsley Amis, who acknowledged the science fiction and satirical character of True Stories at the same time:

I will merely remark that the sprightliness and sophistication of True History make it read like a joke at the expense of nearly all early-modern science fiction, that written between, say, 1910 and 1940.

Modern equivalents, combining science fiction and parody in equal measure, may be found in Voltaire's Micromégas and the works of Douglas Adams.

== Reception ==
Some Roman readers believed that the events in A True Story actually occurred, although Lucian was trying to parody untrue accounts of voyages.

== See also ==
- The Adventures of Baron Munchausen, a 1988 film by Terry Gilliam with various plot similarities.
- History of science fiction
- Meropis
- Moon in science fiction
