= The City of the Sun =

1623 philosophical work by the philosopher Tommaso Campanella

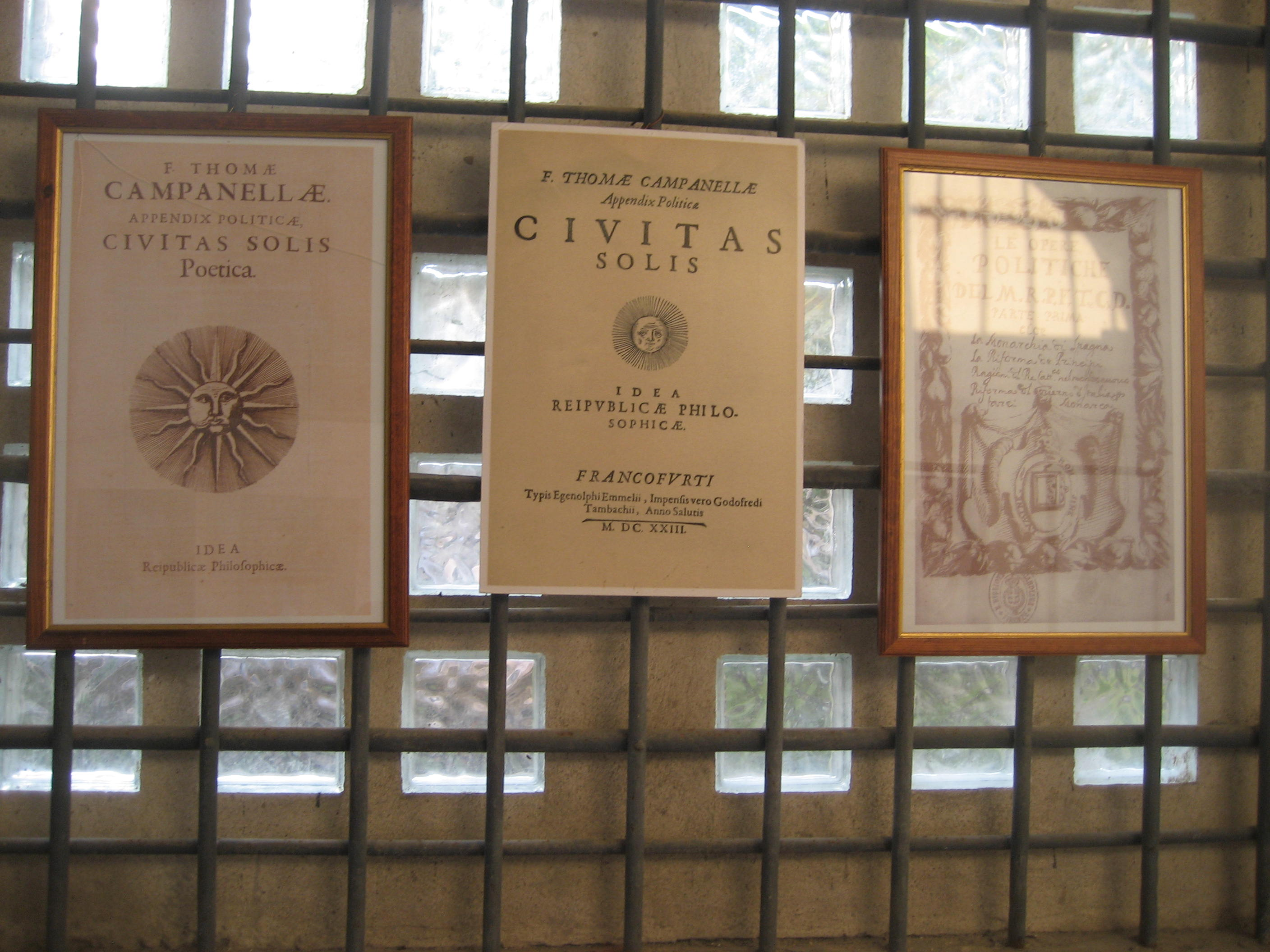
- Author: Tommaso Campanella
- Original title: La città del sole
- Language: Italian
- Genre: Utopian fiction, Science fiction
- Publication date: 1623

The City of the Sun (Italian: La città del sole; Latin: Civitas solis) is a philosophical work by the Italian Dominican philosopher Tommaso Campanella. It is an important early utopian work. The work was written in Italian in 1602, shortly after Campanella's imprisonment for heresy and sedition. A Latin version was written in 1613–14 and published in Frankfurt in 1623.

== Synopsis ==
The book is presented as a dialogue between "a Grandmaster of the Knights Hospitaller and a Genoese Sea-Captain". Inspired by Plato's Republic and the description of Atlantis in Timaeus, it describes a theocratic society where goods, women and children are held in common. It also resembles the City of Adocentyn in the Picatrix, an Arabic grimoire of astrological magic. In the final part of the work, Campanella prophesies—in the veiled language of astrology—that the Spanish kings, in alliance with the Pope, are destined to be the instruments of a Divine Plan: the final victory of the True Faith and its diffusion in the whole world. While one could argue that Campanella was simply thinking of the conquest of the New World, it seems that this prophecy should be interpreted in the light of a work written shortly before The City of the Sun, The Monarchy in Spain, in which Campanella exposes his vision of a unified, peaceful world governed by a theocratic monarchy.

== The city ==
Protected and defended by seven circles of walls, the city is built on a hill, with a temple at the top. The walls of the city are painted with images representing different important fields of knowledge. These include illustrations of the heavens and the stars, of mathematical figures, of every country on earth and of all the marvels and secrets of the mineral, vegetable and animal worlds, until we arrive at mankind: on the internal wall of the sixth circle the mechanical arts and their inventors are represented. On the external wall legislators are depicted; and it is here, in "a place of great honor" — alongside Moses, Osiris, Jove, Mercury and Muhammad— that the Genoese sailor recognizes Christ and the twelve apostles.

Everyone must be acquainted with all lines of work, and then each person practices the one for which he shows the greatest aptitude. They have no servants, and no service is regarded as unworthy. The only thing that they consider to be despicable is idleness, and in this way they come to privilege the dignity of work and to overturn an absurd conception of nobility, linked to inactivity and vice.

As work is divided among all citizens, each spends only four hours a day working. The citizens possess nothing; instead, everything is held in common. The society uses many inventions, such as vessels able to navigate without wind and without sails, and stirrups that make it possible to guide a horse using only one's feet, leaving one's hands free.

A feature of the society that Campanella himself describes as "hard and arduous" is the community of wives. This is the solution adopted by the citizens to the problem of procreation. Sexual generation must obey strict rules regarding the physical and moral qualities of the parents and the choice of a propitious time for conception, determined by an astrologer. Such a union is not the expression of a personal, emotional or passionate relationship, but rather is connected to the social responsibility of generation and to love for the collective community.

The religious beliefs of the citizenry, even though they include fundamental principles of Christianity (such as the immortality of the soul and divine providence), form a natural religion that establishes a sort of osmosis between the city and the stars. The temple is open and not surrounded by walls. The altar, on which are placed a celestial and a terrestrial globe, is in the form of the sun. Prayers are directed toward the heavens. The task of the twenty-four priests, who live in cells located in the highest part of the temple, is to observe the stars and, using astronomical instruments, to take account of all their movements. It is their job to indicate the times most favorable for generation and for agricultural labors, acting in this way as intermediaries between God and human beings.

== Trento 1602 manuscript ==
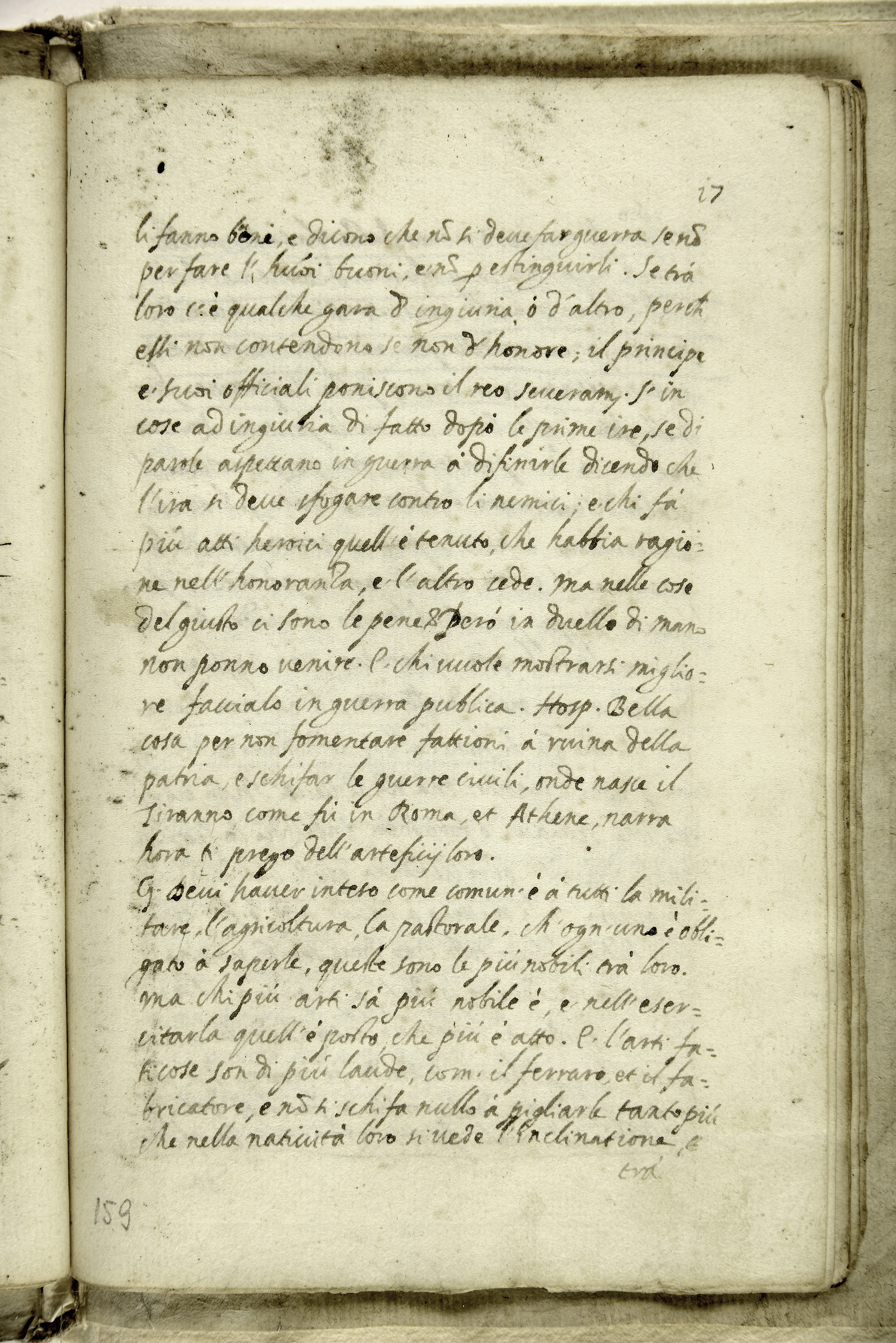
Manuscript page (Trento) 1602

In Trento's Civic Library, there is kept a 1602 manuscript of The City of the Sun (shelf mark BCT1-1538), discovered in 1943 by Italian historian Luigi Firpo. It is considered the most ancient manuscript copy that has survived to the present time. The text arrived at the Library through the bequest of Baron Antonio Mazzetti (1781–1841). He was a book collector and bibliophile and, as written in his will, he donated his book heritage to the Civic Library.

The manuscript was restored in 1980. It is made of parchment tied on paperboard. It consists of two codicological unities joined years after their writing: the first is a Venetian historical chronicle from 1297 to 1582, followed by a list of "Hospedali di Venezia" ("Hospitals in Venice"). At the bottom, it is sewn to a small-sized booklet independently enumerated: it is a copy by an anonymous hand of The City of the Sun. The transcription is meticulous, and there only are a few insignificant mistakes.

== See also ==
- New Atlantis
- Communism
- Ideal city
- Iambulus

== Sources ==
- Le poesie, ed. F. Giancotti (Turin: Einaudi, 1998; new ed. Milan: Bompiani, 2013; English translation by Sherry Roush in two parts: Selected Philosophical Poems, Chicago and London: University of Chicago Press, 2011; Pisa and Rome: Fabrizio Serra, 2011).
