= List of fictional astronauts (Project Apollo era) =

Lists of fictional astronauts
Early period	Project Mercury	Project Gemini
Project Apollo	1975–1989	1990–1999
2000–2009	2010–2029	Moon
Inner Solar System	Outer Solar System	Other
Far future

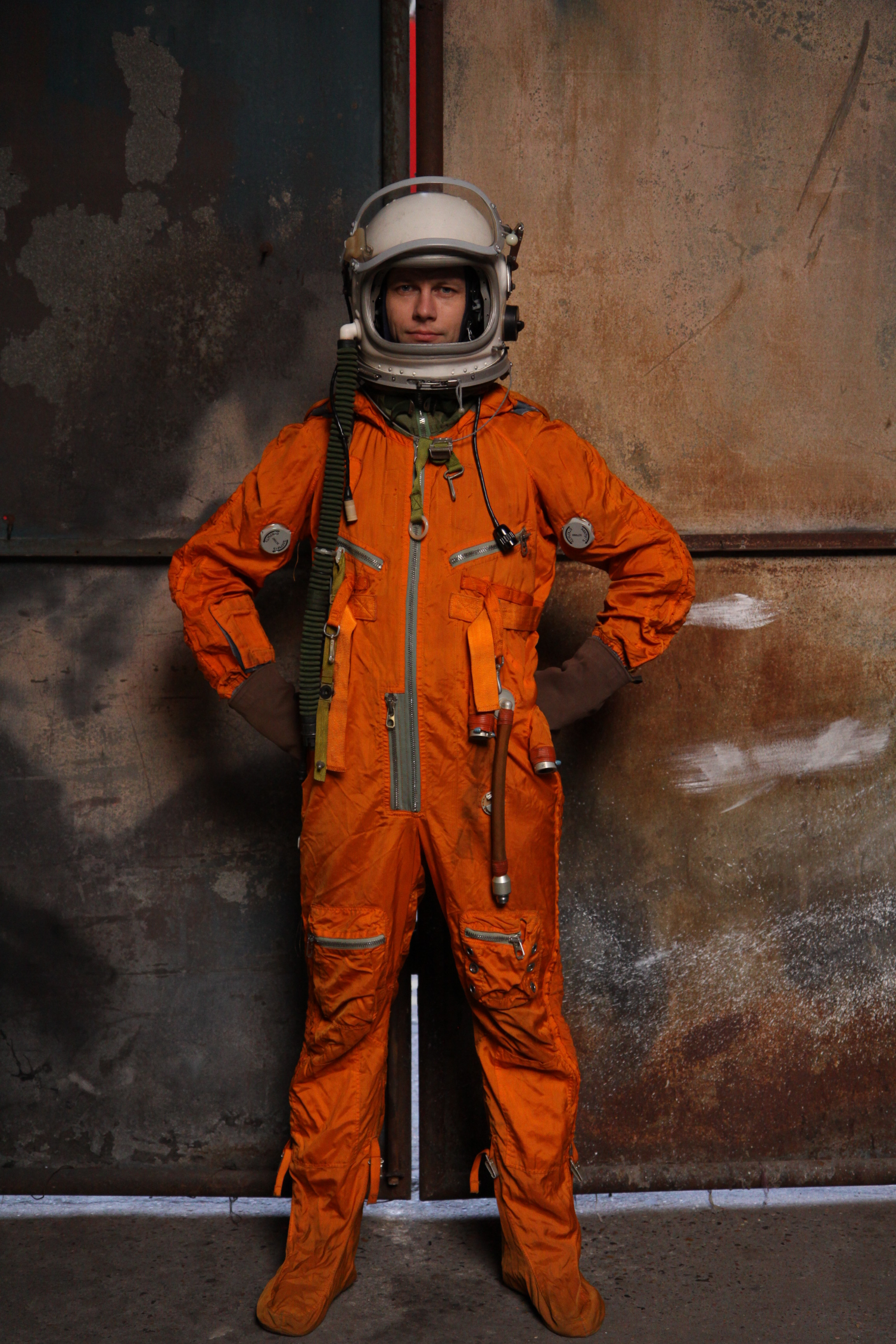
Actor Leon Ockenden as Stas Arsenievich, The Cosmonaut (2013 film)

The following is a list of fictional astronauts from the era of the Apollo program and the early history of the Soyuz spacecraft, during the "Golden Age" of space travel.

== Project Apollo era ==
Name(s)	Appeared in	Program / mission / spacecraft	Fictional date
Apollo (1967–1975)
John Mason (Pilot); Larry Carter (Co-Pilot)	First Men to the Moon (1960), novel	Unknown	Near future
John Mason (Pilot); Larry Carter (Co-Pilot)	Spaceflight veterans Mason and Carter make first human Moon landing near lunar north pole, using direct ascent mission mode and spaceplane fifth stage. Launch and landing on Pacific atoll.		
Abner Evans, Lt. Cmdr. Marco Garcia; Johnny Ingraham	"A Man for the Moon" (1960), short story	United States Navy; Screaming Mimi	Near future
Abner Evans, Lt. Cmdr. Marco Garcia; Johnny Ingraham	Candidates for first Moon flight.		
William Blood Leo; Two other astronauts	Man in the Moon (1960), film	United Kingdom: National Atomic Research Studies [?] and Technological Development (NARSTI)	Near future
William Blood Leo; Two other astronauts	British astronaut Blood makes failed Moon flight.		
Richmond D. "Rich" Talbot, Capt. (USAF)	Starfire (1960), novel Moon Pilot (1962), film	United States Air Force; Project Starfire	May 22–29, 1960 (novel) Contemporary (film)
Richmond D. "Rich" Talbot, Capt. (USAF)	First American human lunar orbit mission.		
Unnamed female cosmonaut	"Hate" (a.k.a. "At the End of Orbit") (1961), short story	Unknown	Contemporary/near future
Unnamed female cosmonaut	First human to orbit Moon crashes in Pacific Ocean near Thursday Island; dies when Hungarian refugee pearl diver prevents her from being rescued before her air runs out.		
Paul Davenport, Capt. (United States)	"Control Somnambule" (1962), short story	Apollo	Near future
Paul Davenport, Capt. (United States)	Astronaut sent on a solo round-the-Moon mission who is subjected to a mysterious temporal discontinuity, subsequently revealed to have been caused by aliens. (Note: Written by William Sambrot, the story was first published in the May 1962 issue of Playboy Magazine.)		
Apollo: Joseph Faulk, Lt. Col. (USMC) (CDR); Lester "Les" Mallon, Lt. Cmdr. (USN) (CMP); Max Kovac, Maj. (USAF) (LMP) CAPCOMs: Whitey Burke; Gary "Dad" Myers; Johnny Waco	Apollo at Go (1963), novel	Apollo; Unnamed CSM/LM	July 1969
Apollo: Joseph Faulk, Lt. Col. (USMC) (CDR); Lester "Les" Mallon, Lt. Cmdr. (USN) (CMP); Max Kovac, Maj. (USAF) (LMP) CAPCOMs: Whitey Burke; Gary "Dad" Myers; Johnny Waco	Crew of first Apollo Moon mission, launched on July 5, 1969; landing in Ocean of Storms. Faulk is a veteran of five previous Apollo missions, including an aborted solo suborbital flight.		
Martin X-20: Mel Lockhart, Capt.	The Crawling Hand (a.k.a. Tomorrow You Die) (1963), film	United States: X-20	November 1963
Martin X-20: Mel Lockhart, Capt.	While returning from second human Moon mission, astronaut Lockhart asks for his spacecraft to be destroyed, but returns to Earth as animate severed arm.		
Danton "Dan" Coye, Col. (USAF) (CDR/CMP); Giovanni "Gino" Lombardi, Maj. (USAF); Eddie Glazer	"Down to Earth" (1963), short story	First American Earth-Moon Expedition: Apollo; Unnamed CSM/LM	September 1971
Danton "Dan" Coye, Col. (USAF) (CDR/CMP); Giovanni "Gino" Lombardi, Maj. (USAF); Eddie Glazer	Crew of first Moon landing mission shifts into alternate reality while in lunar orbit.		
Ivan Kragoff (USSR)	Marvel Comics (1963– )	Unnamed spacecraft	Contemporary
Ivan Kragoff (USSR)	Kragoff makes first human flight to Moon, deliberately exposing himself to cosmic rays in order to gain superpowers and becoming the Red Ghost.		
Grand Fenwick: Alfred Kokintz, Prof. Vincent Mountjoy United States: Two unnamed astronauts Soviet Union: Two unnamed cosmonauts	The Mouse on the Moon (1963), film	Grand Fenwick United States Soviet Union	Contemporary (Summer)
Grand Fenwick: Alfred Kokintz, Prof. Vincent Mountjoy United States: Two unnamed astronauts Soviet Union: Two unnamed cosmonauts	Tiny Duchy of Grand Fenwick reaches Moon with American financial assistance and leftover Russian Vostok rocket. Launch from Grand Fenwick on August 11; American and Russian launches in late August; Moon landings by all three countries on September 1.		
Francis Spender, Col.	"A Question of Re-Entry" (1963), short story	United Nations Space Department; Goliath 7	Early 1970s
Francis Spender, Col.	First man to land on the Moon is eaten by cannibals after crash landing in Brazilian jungle.		
Kanashima, Dr. (no personal name given)	Le jardin de Kanashima (a.k.a. Garden on the Moon) (1964), novel	Japan	October 3, 1942 – October 1970
Kanashima, Dr. (no personal name given)	Physicist Kanashima makes one-way flight to become first man on Moon. Landing at west edge of Sea of Serenity.		
Apollo 3: Charles "Chiz" Stewart Jr., Col. (USAF) (CDR) (unnamed in novel); Rick Lincoln, Lt. (USN) (Navigator); Lee Stegler (Co-Pilot) (named Steven James Lawrence in novel) Pilgrim One: Lee Stegler/Steve Lawrence Vostok/Voskhod: Alexis Plekhanov Vostok/Voskhod: 3 unnamed cosmonauts (1 unnamed cosmonaut in novel)	The Pilgrim Project (1964), novel Countdown (a.k.a. Moonshot) (1968), film	NASA: Apollo 3 (simulation in film); Gemini (Pilgrim One) (Mercury in novel) Soviet Union: 2 Voskhods (2 Vostoks in novel)	Near future
Apollo 3: Charles "Chiz" Stewart Jr., Col. (USAF) (CDR) (unnamed in novel); Rick Lincoln, Lt. (USN) (Navigator); Lee Stegler (Co-Pilot) (named Steven James Lawrence in novel) Pilgrim One: Lee Stegler/Steve Lawrence Vostok/Voskhod: Alexis Plekhanov Vostok/Voskhod: 3 unnamed cosmonauts (1 unnamed cosmonaut in novel)	NASA astronaut using modified Gemini craft (Mercury in novel) to beat the Russians to the Moon. Landing near Surveyor 6 in Oceanus Procellarum.		
Roberts, Col. Simms, Maj.	Doctor Who "Moon Landing" (1965), comic strip	Unknown (rocket marked "MS")	July 1970
Roberts, Col. Simms, Maj.	First men on the Moon. Country of origin not specified. Mission launches on July 20, 1970.		
O. K. Deadhead, Sgt.	Sergeant Dead Head (a.k.a. Sergeant Deadhead, Sergeant Deadhead the Astronut!) (1965), film	United States Air Force (964th Aero-Space Division); Project Moon Monkey: Hercules 3	c. 1968
O. K. Deadhead, Sgt.	Deadhead accidentally stows away aboard spacecraft carrying chimpanzee around the Moon. A planned sequel, Sergeant Deadhead Goes to Mars, was never made.		
Gavin Lewis, Sgt. Clifford Banks, Maj. Howell, Lt. Col. (no first name given) Apollo: Tony LaCava, Lt. Col. (CDR); Martin Daniels, Lt. Col. (USMC) (CMP); Hardy Smith, Cmdr. (USN) (LMP)	The Invaders; Moonshot (1967), TV	F.S.A.: Apollo; Unnamed CSM/LM	Contemporary/near future
Gavin Lewis, Sgt. Clifford Banks, Maj. Howell, Lt. Col. (no first name given) Apollo: Tony LaCava, Lt. Col. (CDR); Martin Daniels, Lt. Col. (USMC) (CMP); Hardy Smith, Cmdr. (USN) (LMP)	After Banks and Howell are killed by mysterious red fog, they are replaced on Moon landing mission by their backups, one of whom is an alien imposter. Lewis was one of the first astronauts, but washed out of Moon program due to fluctuating blood pressure.		
NASA: Frank Lewis, Dr. (Physiologist) (UK); Stern (Pilot-Astronaut) (no first name given); Roy Villiers, Capt. (Pilot-Astronaut) Apollo: Bill Sanders (CDR); Thomas (Co-Pilot) (no first name given); Unnamed astronaut Apollo?: Karl Simmonds (Command Pilot); Bob Mitchell (Co-Pilot); Mike Gransome, Maj. (USAF) (Third Pilot); Zenno Fillipini, Dr. (Italy) (Scientific Observer) Ulysses: Don Hart (Command Pilot); Roger Cope (Co-Pilot); Joseph (Pilot) (no first name given); Jean Romain, Prof. (France) (Scientific Observer)	Kings of Infinite Space (1967), novel	NASA: Apollo; Unnamed CSM/LM; Unnamed CSM/LM Project Ulysses	Autumn 1969 – c. 1970
New group of NASA astronauts selected in 1969 combines pilots and scientists and includes international component. Sanders commands lunar mission aborted when Thomas falls ill in flight. Spaceflight veterans Simmonds and Hart join new astronauts on missions using "Saturn VI" rocket (Saturn V with booster rockets added): four-man lunar mission with expanded spacecraft and Project Ulysses deep-space mission.
KM III: CAP (Expedition Leader); DOC (Documenter/Photographer); MEC (Mechanic/Navigator); PHY (Physician); RNT (Radio/TV Engineer); GEO (Geologist); AST (Astrophysicist); SEL (Selenologist) (no names given)	Die Mondexpedition (Log of a Moon Expedition) (1967 (German), 1969 (English)), novel	Project Alpha: KM I KM II; KM III	Near Future
KM III: CAP (Expedition Leader); DOC (Documenter/Photographer); MEC (Mechanic/Navigator); PHY (Physician); RNT (Radio/TV Engineer); GEO (Geologist); AST (Astrophysicist); SEL (Selenologist) (no names given)	After crewed lunar orbital missions KM I and KM II, the first crewed landing, KM III, is beset with problems. KM III lands in Sinus Medii (near Réaumur and Flammarion), preceded by three cargo landers.		
Mikhail Andreievich Karkhov	"Moondust, the Smell of Hay, and Dialectical Materialism" (1967), short story	Soviet Union	Contemporary (Winter)
Mikhail Andreievich Karkhov	First cosmonaut on Moon awaits death after malfunction. Landing in Ptolemaeus crater.		
Daddy (unnamed)	My Daddy the Astronaut (1967), short film	United States	Contemporary/near future
Daddy (unnamed)	Former jet pilot lands on Moon, then breaks both legs falling off carousel horse.		
Tsiolkovskii A: Lev Alexandrovich Barkagan, Col. (Commandant); Pyotr Sachuk (Subcommandant); Sergei Vinogradov (Commandant's aide); Georgi Zolotarev, Capt. Igor K. Yefremov, Capt. Nikolai "Niki" Urazova, Lt. (Quartermaster); 22 unnamed cosmonauts Tsiolkovskii B: Nikolai Dorodnitsyn, Lt. Col. Dmitri Alexandrov, Maj. Up to six technicians (rotating) Sedov Base: Mikhail Grek, Lt. Col. (Commander); Three unnamed cosmonauts Lenin Base: Pavel K. Shtapova, Lt. Col. (Commandant); Yuri S. Kalganova, Capt. (Subcommandant); Leonid Protsenko, Capt. (Specialist); Alexis Tvardovskii, Capt. (Specialist) NASA: Norm Cramer; Vic Agronte; Syd Franklin; Clint Goodman Apollo; Earth orbital flight: Rance Allenby, Col. (USAF) (CDR); Gene Stanley (USN); Joe Kawolski (US Army) (Engineer) Earth orbital flight: Bill Robinson; John England; Chris Wheatley (Geophysical scientist) Aborted circumlunar flight: Neil Carter; William R. Quartermain; Kevin Wilson Earth orbital flight: Unnamed astronauts Circumlunar flight: Three unnamed astronauts Moon landing: Rance Allenby (CDR); Gene Stanley, Cmdr. (USN) (CMP); Leigh "The Brain" Raymond (LMP/Scientist) Bart Rogers (CapCom) (Note: Not explicitly stated to be an astronaut.) United Nations; Apollo 026: John England (CDR); Bill Quartermain (CMP); Stephen E. Johnson (LMP/Scientist) Air Force-NASA; Moon landing: Rance Allenby (CDR); Joe Kawolski (CMP); Gene Stanley, Capt. (USAF) (Note: Seconded from Navy to Air Force during novel.) (LMP) Circumlunar flight: Two unnamed astronauts Lunar farside landing: Three unnamed astronauts Moon landing: Richard Fuller; Gary Garret; Unnamed CMP Showboat I: Chuck Hewitt (CDR); Bill Quartermain Showboat II: Matt Jorgensen (CDR); Harold Monroe; Kevin Wilson; Brian Joslyn (CMP) Lance/Goddard Lunar Base: Rance Allenby (CDR); Gene Stanley; Joe Kawolski; Dick Spencer (US Army) (Engineer); Chris Wheatley; Ed Meyers (Systems); Gordon Baxter (Logistics); Jim "Paradox" Blessing (Medical technician/Armaments specialist) Circumlunar flight: Two unnamed astronauts China: Approx. 48 unnamed astronauts	No Man's World (1967), novel	USSR Space Command: Tsiolkovskii A Base; Tsiolkovskii B Base; Sedov Base; Lenin Base NASA; Apollo: Two Earth orbital flights Aborted circumlunar flight Earth orbital flight Circumlunar flight Moon landing (CSM/LM) United Nations: Apollo 026 (CSM/LM) United States Air Force-NASA: Moon landing (CSM/LM); Circumlunar flight (CSM); Lunar farside landing (CSM/LM); Moon landing (CSM/LM) Operation Showboat: Showboat I (Modified Apollo CSM); Showboat II (CSM/Three-man LM) Lance; Goddard Lunar Base Circumlunar flight (CSM/cargo lander) People's Republic of China: Unnamed spacecraft	c. 1968 – November 1972
Three years after Soviets reach Moon, American astronauts attempt to follow them. Barkagan was the first man on the Moon, landing on August 22, 1968. Tsiolkovskii A Base located near southwest edge of Ptolemaeus crater, near 11°S 4°W; Tsiolkovskii B south of Tsiolkovskii A in Alphonsus; Sedov Base north of Tsiolkovskii A, at 28°N 3°W; Lenin Base near southwest edge of Sinus Iridum. Allenby, Stanley and Kawolski fly first Earth-orbital Apollo/Saturn V mission. Carter, Quartermain and Wilson's Saturn V explodes after liftoff; crew saved by escape tower. First American Moon landing at 14°40′S 8°30′W, north of Lassell crater. UN Moon landing in center of Davy Y. Allenby's second landing in Gassendi crater. Fuller and Garret land in southern Mare Humorum, north of Doppelmayer crater. Showboat II establishes decoy LeMay Base at 6°S 17°W, west of Fra Mauro E. Goddard Base established on southeast flank of central peak of Alphonsus; Goddard Base crew fly Lance spacecraft launched by Titan IIIE to reach lunar ferry with two lunar landers in Earth orbit. Twelve Chinese astronauts land in Sinus Aestuum, near Eratosthenes. Goodman is a former X-15 pilot.
Roy Fleming; Fred Gifford, Maj.	The Reluctant Astronaut (1967), film	Apollo	Contemporary
Roy Fleming; Fred Gifford, Maj.	Russia plans on sending a dentist into space, to show the safety of their space program. NASA launches Fleming, Cape Canaveral's newest janitor, upstaging Russian launch.		
McIntyre (no first name given) Epsilon: Michael Stevens Harder, Col. (USAF) (Station Commander); Page Alison, Dr. (US) (Life Sciences); Henri Guy-Michel, Col. (Dr.) (French Air Force) (Communications and Navigation Program Director); William Jordan (USAF) (First Engineer); Werner Koelbe, Dr. (born Hans Bayerlein) (West Germany) (Physician/Medical research); Luke Parsons (USMC) (Engineer); Timothy Pollard, Dr. (Professor of Astronomical Sciences) (UK); June Strond, Ph.D. (Norway) (Geophysics and Earth Sciences Expert) StatCom: Atkins (no first name given) (Note: Not explicitly stated to be an astronaut.); Stubby Dolan Bandit One: Jack Dexter (Command Pilot); Ken Sanborne, Dr. (Physician); Hal Gunner, Dr. (Physician)	Four Came Back (1968), novel	Space Station; Epsilon Bandit One (lifting body) (launched by Titan IIIC)	September 1972
International space station crew ravaged by mysterious illness. Epsilon consists of two Saturn II tanks and one S-IVB tank, linked by cables and rotating to provide artificial gravity. Jordan and Parsons previously flew together on a 16-day orbital Apollo mission in 1969; Pollard flew on an Earth-orbital Apollo Applications Program mission in late 1970, becoming the first British astronaut in space. McIntyre suffered from a skin reaction during an earlier Apollo mission.
AS-906: Norwood "Woody" Liscombe, Lt. Col. (Command Pilot); Ted Green, Lt. Col. (Navigator); Doug Albers, Lt. Cmdr. (USN) AS-906 first reserve team/Phoenix One crew: Gordon "Gord" Nash (Flight Commander); Bill Ransom; Unnamed astronaut Second reserve team: Glenn Eglund, Col. (CDR); Roger Caine, Cmdr. John Corbinet	Nick Carter-Killmaster; Operation Moon Rocket (1968), novel	Apollo; AS-906 (Unnamed CSM/LM) Phoenix One (Apollo)	1968 (from May 16)
AS-906: Norwood "Woody" Liscombe, Lt. Col. (Command Pilot); Ted Green, Lt. Col. (Navigator); Doug Albers, Lt. Cmdr. (USN) AS-906 first reserve team/Phoenix One crew: Gordon "Gord" Nash (Flight Commander); Bill Ransom; Unnamed astronaut Second reserve team: Glenn Eglund, Col. (CDR); Roger Caine, Cmdr. John Corbinet	AS-906 crew is killed in spacecraft fire caused by sabotage; NASA hastily launches Phoenix One as follow-up. Liscombe is a Mercury and Gemini veteran; Green and Nash are Gemini veterans.		
Larry; Hank; George (no last names given)	A Trip in Space (1968), picture book	Apollo	Contemporary
Larry; Hank; George (no last names given)	Astronauts on typical Apollo Earth-orbital mission.		
Walter Emmons (CDR); Ed MacKenzie (CMP); Michael Carter (LMP)	The Bold Ones: The New Doctors; One Small Step for Man (1969), TV	Apollo; Unnamed (CSM)/Retriever (LM)	Contemporary
Walter Emmons (CDR); Ed MacKenzie (CMP); Michael Carter (LMP)	Apollo crew experiences medical emergency prior to lunar landing. Carter is first Black astronaut on Moon mission.		
Major Tom	David Bowie's songs (1969–2015) and various other songs	Unknown	Contemporary
Major Tom	Astronaut sent on a mission "one hundred thousand miles" away from the Earth, as chronicled in "Space Oddity" (1969), and who loses contact with "Ground Control" while in lunar orbit. References to him are made in "Ashes to Ashes" (1980) and the remixed version of "Hallo Spaceboy" as well as, possibly, the music videos of "Slow Burn" (1995) and Bowie's last song, "Blackstar" (2015), which might imply that Major Tom did not survive his mission.		
Kenneth McGeorge, Maj.	The Hardy Boys; The Arctic Patrol Mystery (1969), novel	Apollo	Contemporary
Kenneth McGeorge, Maj.	Astronaut kidnapped in Iceland while training for Moon mission.		
Ironman One: Jim Pruett (Mission Commander); Clayton Stone, Ph.D. (Scientist); Buzz Lloyd (Pilot) Voskhod: Andrei Yakovlev X-RV: Ted Dougherty (USAF)	Marooned (1969), film, novel	Ironman One (Apollo Applications Program); Voskhod; X-RV lifting body	Near future
Ironman One: Jim Pruett (Mission Commander); Clayton Stone, Ph.D. (Scientist); Buzz Lloyd (Pilot) Voskhod: Andrei Yakovlev X-RV: Ted Dougherty (USAF)	NASA astronauts trapped in a defective capsule; a Russian cosmonaut attempts aid.		
Unnamed astronaut	Squaps, the Moonling (1969), picture book	Unknown	Contemporary/near future
Unnamed astronaut	An astronaut takes a Moon creature home to meet his children.		
Andria Vishinkin, Maj. (Soviet Air Force)	Stalin, Tommy Tucker and God (1969), novel	Soyuz	1973
Andria Vishinkin, Maj. (Soviet Air Force)	This is not specifically a space-related novel, but a central character is Major Vishinkin, a cosmonaut in her mid-twenties, who is repeatedly described as the ‘most famous woman in Russia’. In the plot, she has just returned to Moscow from a solo space mission. The novel is openly set in 1973, so this appears to be a Soyuz.		
Thomas (CDR) (no first/last name given); Miller (no first name given); Unnamed astronaut	"A Triptych" (1969), short story	Apollo?	1968
Thomas (CDR) (no first/last name given); Miller (no first name given); Unnamed astronaut	Astronauts on deep space mission. Astronaut identified as "X" was not allowed to take part in broadcast from earlier flight after threatening to make dirty joke on air. Revised version included in 1971 fix-up novel Universe Day as Chapter II, "Some Headlines in the Void 1968".		
Robert Ruggles "Rug" McCargo, Cmdr. (USN); Gildy, Capt. (CMP); Parmenter, Cmdr. (no first names given for last two)	The Apollo Legacy (1970), novel	Apollo; Unnamed CSM/LM The American-European-Soviet Outerspace Program (AESOP)	Contemporary/near future (July)
Robert Ruggles "Rug" McCargo, Cmdr. (USN); Gildy, Capt. (CMP); Parmenter, Cmdr. (no first names given for last two)	NASA astronauts who traveled to Moon with monkey. All three astronauts landed on Moon; Parmenter remained inside LM. Landing at edge of Copernicus. Gildy is the first Black astronaut.		
Jerry McGrath, Maj. (USAF) (Command Pilot); Earl Boggs, Maj. (USAF) (Pilot) Andrew Zapf, Col. (USAF) (Backup pilot/CAPCOM)	Countdown (1970), novel	Federal Space Agency (FSA): Hermes II (command module); Pegasus Orbiting Laboratory	Near future (early 1970s)
Jerry McGrath, Maj. (USAF) (Command Pilot); Earl Boggs, Maj. (USAF) (Pilot) Andrew Zapf, Col. (USAF) (Backup pilot/CAPCOM)	Post-Apollo wet workshop space station with potential military applications. Zapf is a Gemini and Apollo veteran.		
Bill Edwards (Command Pilot); Dick Larch (UK); Max Friedman	Doomwatch; Re-entry Forbidden (1970), TV	NASA: Sunfire 1 Sunfire 2	Contemporary/near future
Bill Edwards (Command Pilot); Dick Larch (UK); Max Friedman	First flights of nuclear-powered spacecraft go awry. Larch is first British astronaut in space.		
Unnamed astronaut	"Journey Across a Crater" (1970), short story	Cosmos 253	Contemporary/near future
Unnamed astronaut	Astronaut who engages in bizarre behavior and sexual perversions after spacecraft breaks up on re-entry.		
Unnamed LM Commander; Unnamed LM Radio Officer; Steven L. Lewison, Lt. 7 unnamed astronauts	"Starlight Shining Through Her Eyes" (1970), short story	United States Air Force; Division of Space Exploration; Project Wellspring: Ten-man LM	July 1969 / Future
Unnamed LM Commander; Unnamed LM Radio Officer; Steven L. Lewison, Lt. 7 unnamed astronauts	As a boy, Lewison believes stranded girl whose parents died in spacecraft crash contacted him from the Moon during Apollo 11 mission; he grows up to become an astronaut. Project Wellspring landing in Sea of Tranquility.		
Unnamed CSM/LM; Franklin Grimsby, Maj. Falcon; Jonathan Cornelius Evans, Lt. Cmdr. (CDR); Jimmy Webster (CMP); Charlie Willmers (LMP)	"Does the Name Grimsby Do Anything to You?" (1971), short story	Unknown craft Apollo; Unnamed CSM/Falcon (LM)	1969
Unnamed CSM/LM; Franklin Grimsby, Maj. Falcon; Jonathan Cornelius Evans, Lt. Cmdr. (CDR); Jimmy Webster (CMP); Charlie Willmers (LMP)	The first astronaut to walk on the Moon returns shaken, his sleep disturbed with nightmares, due to an incident during the first moonwalk.		
Unnamed CSM/LM; Unnamed CDR; Richard Martin, Lt. Col. (CMP); Unnamed LMP Anna Christie; Roger Allen, Capt. (CDR); Joseph Busby, Col. (CMP); William Davis, Lt. Col. (LMP)	The Falling Astronauts (1971), novel	Apollo; Unnamed CSM/LM; Anna Christie (CSM)/Unnamed (LM)	Alternate late 1970s?
Unnamed CSM/LM; Unnamed CDR; Richard Martin, Lt. Col. (CMP); Unnamed LMP Anna Christie; Roger Allen, Capt. (CDR); Joseph Busby, Col. (CMP); William Davis, Lt. Col. (LMP)	When the Command Module Pilot (CMP) of a lunar mission carrying nuclear seismic charges goes berserk, only the mission's information officer, a former CMP himself, stands between Earth and catastrophe. Davis is the first sociologist sent on a lunar mission.		
Dick Matthews, Col. (CDR); Jim Dunlap, Maj. (CMP); Frank Perry, Capt. (LMP)	Here's Lucy "Lucy and the Astronauts" (1971), TV	Apollo	Contemporary
Dick Matthews, Col. (CDR); Jim Dunlap, Maj. (CMP); Frank Perry, Capt. (LMP)	Astronauts returning from Moon are quarantined with Lucy Carter.		
Hannson (CDR) (no first name given); Two unnamed astronauts	Mutant 59: The Plastic Eater (1971), novel	Apollo 19	Contemporary
Hannson (CDR) (no first name given); Two unnamed astronauts	The crew of a returning lunar mission are killed on re-entry because the Command Module systems have been contaminated with a plastic-eating virus.		
Poul Anderson	Alpha Alpha; Der Astronaut (1972), TV	NASA	Contemporary
Poul Anderson	Astronaut disappears after reentry.		
Dick Whitfield, Col.	The Brady Bunch "My Fair Opponent" (1972), TV	Apollo?	Contemporary
Dick Whitfield, Col.	Astronaut scheduled for Moon mission is guest of honor at Marcia Brady's junior high school senior banquet night.		
Shuckworth; Shanks; Showler (no first names given)	Charlie and the Great Glass Elevator (1972), novel	Commuter Capsule	1972
Shuckworth; Shanks; Showler (no first names given)	Astronauts ferry hotel staff aboard Commuter Capsule to Space Hotel "U.S.A.", where they are attacked by Vermicious Knids.		
Steve Austin, Col. (USAF); Kelly Wood, Maj. Josh Lang; David Tate; Leah Russell, Dr.	Cyborg (1972), novel The Six Million Dollar Man (1973–78), TV	Apollo 18	Contemporary
Steve Austin, Col. (USAF); Kelly Wood, Maj. Josh Lang; David Tate; Leah Russell, Dr.	Novel by Martin Caidin and television series derived from it. Austin is a NASA astronaut injured in testing landing characteristics of lifting bodies in anticipation of the Space Shuttle program. Other astronauts and cosmonauts appear in the TV series episodes Doomsday, and Counting; The Rescue of Athena One; Burning Bright; The Pioneers (1974); and The Deadly Countdown (1977).		
Walter Monaghan	Revelations (1972), novel	Fifteenth Expedition	1970s
Walter Monaghan	Twenty-ninth man on Moon attempts to reveal terrible secrets about space program on exploitative TV talk show.		
George Lattimer; Bobby Gelman	Top of the Heap (1972), film	Apollo	Contemporary
George Lattimer; Bobby Gelman	Lattimer, an African-American police officer in Washington, D.C., fantasizes himself and his partner as astronauts on Moon mission.		
Unnamed US astronaut	The Exorcist (1973), film	Apollo	Contemporary
Unnamed US astronaut	US astronaut whose death in space is foretold by Regan MacNeil. Connected by author William Peter Blatty to astronaut Billy Cutshaw in The Ninth Configuration.		
Fergusson (CDR); Hennis; Drake (first names not given)	The Medusa Touch (1973), novel; The Medusa Touch (1978), film	Achilles 6 (Apollo-like); Unnamed CSM/LM	Contemporary/near future
Fergusson (CDR); Hennis; Drake (first names not given)	Moon mission is doomed by telekinetic John Morlar.		
Roland "Rick" Lawrence, Capt. (USN) (CDR); Benjamin Pelham (CMP); David Anderson, Col. (LMP) Tom Estes (CAPCOM); Flip Crowell (CAPCOM) (Note: Does not appear in the film.); Irving Sellers (backup) (Note: Does not appear in the film.)	Stowaway to the Moon: The Camelot Odyssey (1973), novel; Stowaway to the Moon (1975), TV movie	Apollo; Camelot (CSM)/Little Dipper (LM)	Contemporary
Roland "Rick" Lawrence, Capt. (USN) (CDR); Benjamin Pelham (CMP); David Anderson, Col. (LMP) Tom Estes (CAPCOM); Flip Crowell (CAPCOM); Irving Sellers (backup)	NASA astronauts on an Apollo mission to the Altai Highlands who discover a child in the command module.		
Michael Kamp, Capt.	Dhalgren (1974), novel	Apollo	Contemporary?
Michael Kamp, Capt.	Apollo astronaut who visits the city of Bellona.		
William Driscoll; David Kneller; Leonard Wenger (CMP); Harold Hansar (LMP)	The Last Canadian (a.k.a. Death Wind, The Last American) (1974), novel	Apollo 23 ("John") (CSM/Lunar Exploration Module); Moonlab I Moonlab II	Near future
William Driscoll; David Kneller; Leonard Wenger (CMP); Harold Hansar (LMP)	Astronauts left without guidance from Houston after plague wipes out human life in United States.		
Melville (no first name given)	"My Dream of Flying to Wake Island" (1974), short story	Unknown (Three-man spacecraft)	Contemporary/near future
Melville (no first name given)	Astronaut recovering from "mental breakdown in space."		
John Christie "Chris" Andrews, Lt. Col. (USAF) (CDR); Harrison "Hank" Baker (CMP); Jim Cooper (LMP)	"The Eve of the Last Apollo" (1976), short story	Apollo; Unnamed CSM/LM	Summer 1975 (through July 18)
John Christie "Chris" Andrews, Lt. Col. (USAF) (CDR); Harrison "Hank" Baker (CMP); Jim Cooper (LMP)	Five years after becoming first man on Moon, Andrews experiences midlife crisis concurrent with Apollo–Soyuz Test Project.		
Bob Grodin	Alternative 3 (1977), TV (hoax documentary)	Apollo	Contemporary
Bob Grodin	NASA astronaut who landed on the Moon and inadvertently stumbled upon a secret moonbase.		
Richard Royce, Cmdr. (USN); Stan Richmond (CMP)	Hawaii Five-O; Shake Hands With The Man On The Moon (1977), TV	Apollo	Contemporary
Richard Royce, Cmdr. (USN); Stan Richmond (CMP)	Washed-up astronaut Royce gets involved with crooked real estate developer.		
US: Rick Delanty, Lt. Col. (USAF); John Baker, Col. (USAF); Evan (no last name given); Drew Wellen; McAlliard (no first name given) USSR: Pieter Jakov, Brig; Leonilla Alexandrovna Malik, M.D.	Lucifer's Hammer (1977), novel	Space Station; Spacelab 2 Apollo Soyuz	Alternate 1970s
US: Rick Delanty, Lt. Col. (USAF); John Baker, Col. (USAF); Evan (no last name given); Drew Wellen; McAlliard (no first name given) USSR: Pieter Jakov, Brig; Leonilla Alexandrovna Malik, M.D.	Joint US/Soviet crew studying the close approach to Earth of the comet Hamner-Brown from orbit. Evan was Command Module pilot on an Apollo mission. Baker flew on a mission similar to Skylab 2 and did a spacewalk. McAlliard was sick during a long-duration space mission, possibly Baker's.		
Scott Rogers	The New Adventures of Batman; The Moonman (1977), TV	Unknown	Contemporary
Scott Rogers	College friend of Bruce Wayne flew solo mission to the Moon.		
Horace Jones, Col. (CDR); Joseph Pelham, Cmdr. (DMP); Sydney Loren, Dr. (MS)	Sargasso (1977), novel	Apollo 19	1977
Horace Jones, Col. (CDR); Joseph Pelham, Cmdr. (DMP); Sydney Loren, Dr. (MS)	NASA crew of Apollo 19, a joint mission with the Soviets and the last Apollo flight before advent of the Space Shuttle. They vanish from their spacecraft when it splashes down in the Bermuda Triangle.		
Arthur Eaton	Natural Enemies (1979), film	Apollo	Contemporary
Arthur Eaton	Astronaut who wants to write magazine article about his experience on the Moon.		
Billy Cutshaw, Capt. (USMC)	The Ninth Configuration (a.k.a. Twinkle, Twinkle, Killer Kane) (1980), film	Apollo	Contemporary
Billy Cutshaw, Capt. (USMC)	United States astronaut who lost his sanity just before launching into space. Connected by author William Peter Blatty to astronaut character in The Exorcist.		
Nate; Andy; Boris (last names not given)	Superman II (1980), film	Artemis 2 (Apollo-like)	Contemporary
Nate; Andy; Boris (last names not given)	Fictional Society for International Space Exploration (SISE)-Soviet joint lunar mission. Crew killed by escaped Kyptonian criminals.		
Trippett, Capt. (USN); Slade (first names not given)	"News from the Sun" (1981), short story	NASA	Unknown
Trippett, Capt. (USN); Slade (first names not given)	Trippett was the last man on the Moon; Slade was a trainee astronaut who washed out of the space program.		
Unnamed CDR; Robert S. Massey (CMP); Unnamed LMP	The Red Dove (1982), novel	Apollo; Unnamed CSM/LM (Note: The Apollo mission mentioned in the novel is implied to be Apollo 17.)	1972, flashback from 1983
Unnamed CDR; Robert S. Massey (CMP); Unnamed LMP	US astronaut who has a mental breakdown while preparing for a press conference after returning from the Moon. Later used by the CIA to persuade a Soviet cosmonaut to defect along with his spacecraft.		
Garrett Breedlove	Terms of Endearment (1983), The Evening Star (1996), films	Apollo	Contemporary
Garrett Breedlove	Retired middle-aged astronaut played by Jack Nicholson.		
Thomas Jefferson Stamford, Col. (USAF) (CDR)	"The Object of the Attack" (1984), short story	Apollo 20	1974 / 1982–1988
Thomas Jefferson Stamford, Col. (USAF) (CDR)	Retired NASA astronaut, rumored to have commanded secret Apollo 20 mission to place nuclear missile station in Mare Imbrium, becomes world-renowned religious leader.		
Christopher J. Ahern, Col. (USAF)	Simon & Simon "The Wrong Stuff" (1984), TV	Apollo	Contemporary
Christopher J. Ahern, Col. (USAF)	Veteran of 1971 moonwalk works for aerospace company connected to porn film.		
Forrest Gump; Janet Fritch, Maj.	Forrest Gump (1985), novel	Unknown	Contemporary
Forrest Gump; Janet Fritch, Maj.	Gump's history as an astronaut was not included in the film adaptation.		
William Miles, Ph.D.	Remington Steele "Steele in the Chips" (1985), TV	Apollo	Contemporary
William Miles, Ph.D.	Astronaut who walked on Moon promotes Booster Bars for food company.		
Luna 15; Nikolai L. Kuzmin; Unnamed cosmonaut Armstrong Base; Unnamed astronauts	Top Secret "Codename: Starfall" (1987), role playing game	FKA; Luna 15 NASA Moonbase; Armstrong Base	1969 & 1999
Luna 15; Nikolai L. Kuzmin; Unnamed cosmonaut Armstrong Base; Unnamed astronauts	Soviet cosmonauts sent to beat Apollo 11 to the Moon. Kuzmin is killed in the crash landing; his unnamed companion lives long enough to plant the Soviet flag on the lunar surface. Their remains are not discovered for thirty years.		
Gerald R. "Gunner" Smith, Cmdr. (CDR); William C. Griffin, Capt. (CMP); Edward Scott Stone, Capt. (LMP)	Darkside (1988), play	Apollo 18; Independence (CSM)/Yorktown (LM)	Autumn 1973
Gerald R. "Gunner" Smith, Cmdr. (CDR); William C. Griffin, Capt. (CMP); Edward Scott Stone, Capt. (LMP)	Smith and Stone are stranded on Moon when LM engine fails to ignite.		
Paul Andrews	Beyond the Stars (1989), film	Apollo	Contemporary
Paul Andrews	NASA astronaut who landed on the Moon.		
Spike "Touchdown" Tiggler (USN); Bud Stomovicz; Mike (CMP) (no last name given)	A History of the World in 10½ Chapters (1989), novel	Apollo; Unnamed CSM/LM	1943 – c. 1978
Spike "Touchdown" Tiggler (USN); Bud Stomovicz; Mike (CMP) (no last name given)	Former astronaut Tiggler searches for Noah's Ark on Mount Ararat. Moon landing in summer 1974.		
John Harper Wilson, Maj. (USSF) (Commander); Neil Holliday, Capt. (USSF) (Eagle One Pilot/Second-in-command); 18 unnamed astronauts	"John Harper Wilson" (1989), short story	United States Space Force (USSF); Luna One: Eagle One, Eagle Two (passenger ships); Eagle Three (cargo ship)	July 1969 (alternate history) / 1988 (alternate history)
John Harper Wilson, Maj. (USSF) (Commander); Neil Holliday, Capt. (USSF) (Eagle One Pilot/Second-in-command); 18 unnamed astronauts	In alternate history, Eagle One makes first human Moon landing on July 20, 1969, in Sea of Tranquility; Wilson is first man on Moon. USSF spacecraft Columbus made first human lunar flyby in December 1968 (crew unnamed). Set in same timeline as Steele's short story "Goddard's People" and novels V-S Day and The Tranquillity Alternative (q.v.).		
Dave "Rockford" Muldorff, Col. (USAF) (CDR); Thomas Milburne Gavin, Maj. (USAF) (CMP); Richard Edgar Baedecker, Col. (USMC) (LMP)	Phases of Gravity (1989), novel	Apollo; Peregrine (CSM)/Discovery (LM)	December 1971 / June 1987 – November 1988
Dave "Rockford" Muldorff, Col. (USAF) (CDR); Thomas Milburne Gavin, Maj. (USAF) (CMP); Richard Edgar Baedecker, Col. (USMC) (LMP)	In June 1987, Baedecker takes a business trip to India and begins a voyage of self-discovery. 1971 landing near Marius Crater in Oceanus Procellarum.		
Albert Calavicci, Rear Adm. (USN)	Quantum Leap (1989–93), TV	"Apollo 8"	c. 1968 / 1999
Albert Calavicci, Rear Adm. (USN)	NASA astronaut in Apollo program. Circled the Moon ten times. Calavicci landed the spacecraft safely after the computer systems crashed.		
Mitiok Sviridenko (Trainee) Luna-17B: Sema Anikin (First stage); Ivan Grechka (Second stage); Otto Plucis (Third stage); Dima Matiushevich (Lunar module); Omon Matveevich Krivomazov (Note: Patronymic not given; deduced from father's name.) (call sign Ra) (Lunokhod) Luna-17B: Pasiuk "Pasha" Drach, Maj. Zurab "Zura" Pratsvania, Capt. Salyut: Armen Vezirov; Djambul Mezhelaitis	Omon Ra (1992), novel	Luna-17B/Lunokhod; Salyut	1970s
Mitiok Sviridenko (Trainee) Luna-17B: Sema Anikin (First stage); Ivan Grechka (Second stage); Otto Plucis (Third stage); Dima Matiushevich (Lunar module); Omon Matveevich Krivomazov (call sign Ra) (Lunokhod) Luna-17B: Pasiuk "Pasha" Drach, Maj. Zurab "Zura" Pratsvania, Capt. Salyut: Armen Vezirov; Djambul Mezhelaitis	With the Soviet Union unable to operate automated spacecraft, young cosmonauts train for suicide mission to lunar farside.		
Roy "Eject"; Richard; Howard (no last names given)	"Walking on the Moon" (1992), short story	Apollo; Unnamed CSM/LM	Contemporary (July 4)
Roy "Eject"; Richard; Howard (no last names given)	Apollo crew reunites for holiday get-together. Set in same timeline as Steele's Near-Space series.		
Boris Prishkin, Col. Ekaterina Univer "Katya" Prishkin Soyuz 4: Dmitry Mikhailovich "Mitya" Zhukovsky, Col. (Commander); Soyuz 5: Konstantine K. "Kostya" Strogolshikov, Col. (Commander); Valya Glavtop, Capt. Kolya Grin, Capt. (latter two transfer to Soyuz 4) Luna 15: Dmitry Mikhailovich Zhukovsky, Major-General (Command Pilot); Konstantine K. Strogolshikov, Major-General; Alexander Alexandrovich "Sasha" Oryolin, Major-General (Flight Engineer) Cosmonaut squadron: Yurka Adama-Bibliov; Vitya Artzybashev, Capt. Misha Cherryntevsky, Maj. Zhora Fedyuninsky, Maj. Valya Glavtop, Capt. Kolya Grin, Capt. Kopa Kandidim, Capt. Trifya Miserbiev; Tima Schtange, Lt. Genka Stumpelkin, Lt. Vasya Tevyelook, Lt. Cosmonaut candidates: Peter Apollonovich "Petya" Nevsky, Lt. Marcus Gogol, Dr. Lev Lympyet, Prof. Arkady Volgamints, Maj.	Peter Nevsky and the True Story of the Russian Moon Landing (1993), novel	Soyuz 4 Soyuz 5 Luna 15 (Soyuz); Laikushka (lunar lander)	June 17, 1968 – July 21, 1969
Cosmonauts in renewed push for lunar landing. Oryolin, Strogolshikov and Zhukovsky command squadron within Cosmonaut Corps. Soyuz 4/5 fly January 14–18, 1969 (as in reality). Luna 15 launches July 14, 1969; crash landing (in Sea of Crisis) and loss of contact on July 21. Nevsky, Stumpelkin, Gogol and Lympyet later fly Earth orbital missions in the 1970s and 1980s; Nevsky becomes commander of Cosmonaut Corps and visits Tranquillity Base with Stumpelkin at turn of century. Boris Prishkin was a cosmonaut in the early days of the Russian program; Katya Prishkin was one of four female cosmonauts trained for Vostok 6.
Duke "Danger Duke" Robinson; Unnamed CMP	Murphy Brown "Where Have You Gone, Joe DiMaggio?" (1994), TV Love & War "A Nation Turns Its Lonely Eyes to You" (1994), TV	Apollo; Unnamed CSM/LM	Contemporary
Duke "Danger Duke" Robinson; Unnamed CMP	Robinson is target of slow-speed chase by police after allegedly murdering his brother with a Moon rock. His Moon mission's CMP is the getaway driver. Robinson played croquet on the Moon and was the technical advisor for Capricorn One.		
Gemini: Chuck Brittain (Gemini 9 prime crew); Allen Cloud (USAF) (Gemini 12 Pilot) Apollo: Allen Cloud (CDR); Walt Hammond (CMP); Charlie Sumner (LMP) Pete Leitner (Backup CDR)	Sea of Tranquillity (1994), novel	Apollo (Apollo 16?); Cormorant (CSM)/Raptor (LM)	1970–1990
Gemini: Chuck Brittain (Gemini 9 prime crew); Allen Cloud (USAF) (Gemini 12 Pilot) Apollo: Allen Cloud (CDR); Walt Hammond (CMP); Charlie Sumner (LMP) Pete Leitner (Backup CDR)	Astronaut Cloud becomes estranged from his gay son. Moon mission in April 1972, landing in Cayley Plains; Cloud and Sumner are ninth and tenth men on Moon. Brittain was killed in NASA T-38 crash.		
Charles "Ace" Galvin, Lt. Col. Buzz Thompson	Wings "The Wrong Stuff" (1994), TV	Apollo	Contemporary
Charles "Ace" Galvin, Lt. Col. Buzz Thompson	Moonwalker Galvin is invited to endorse Sandpiper Air.		
Apollo 21: Stan Freeman, Ph.D. (CDR); Ben Santori (CMP); Nick Jensen (LMP) Apollo 29: Nick Jensen; Amy Jordan; Unnamed astronaut Ares: Nick Jensen (Mission Commander); Amy Jordan; Jake Burnett; 15 unnamed astronauts Star Spear: Six unnamed astronauts Discovery: Nick Jensen; Amy Jordan; Four unnamed astronauts Challenger: Jill Rodriguez; Unnamed astronauts	"In Saturn Time" (1995), short story	Apollo 21; Nightwing (CSM)/Flamebird (LM) Apollo 29 Ares Space Transportation System; Star Spear Discovery; Challenger	October 15, 1974 – October 19, 2001 (alternate history)
Apollo 21: Stan Freeman, Ph.D. (CDR); Ben Santori (CMP); Nick Jensen (LMP) Apollo 29: Nick Jensen; Amy Jordan; Unnamed astronaut Ares: Nick Jensen (Mission Commander); Amy Jordan; Jake Burnett; 15 unnamed astronauts Star Spear: Six unnamed astronauts Discovery: Nick Jensen; Amy Jordan; Four unnamed astronauts Challenger: Jill Rodriguez; Unnamed astronauts	Alternate history in which Morris Udall defeated Richard Nixon in 1972 Presidential election. Flamebird lands in Peary crater near north pole of Moon. Freeman is the first Black man in space. Bykovsky and Leonov land at edge of Oceanus Procellarum aboard Soyuz L-4 in summer 1977, during American Apollo 29 mission. NASA launches Moonbase to site near Amundsen crater aboard Saturn 5M in spring 1980. Jensen flies to lunar station with Walter Cronkite in August 1984. Jensen, Jordan and Burnett make first crewed landing on Mars in May 1988; Jensen is first human on Mars. Space Transportation System flies for first time in June 1993. Discovery and Challenger fly to Jupiter in 2001 and orbit Callisto.		
Tom Scott (CDR); Chad Williams (LMP)	Walking on the Moon (1995), play	Apollo 18; Unnamed CSM/LM	c. 1996 – 1997
Tom Scott (CDR); Chad Williams (LMP)	During 1975 Apollo 18 mission to Taurus–Littrow, Williams accidentally ran over Scott with Lunar Roving Vehicle, leaving him in a coma. Twenty years later, Williams is tempted to kill Scott in order to sell his story to Hollywood.		
Nikolai Gushkov; Alexander Brinkov	The Cape "Buried in Peace" (1996), TV	Soviet crewed lunar programs, Soyuz (Note: The Soyuz depicted in the episode most closely resembles the 7K-TM used for the ASTP, rather than the 7K-L1 lunar flyby or 7K-LOK lunar landing versions.)	1968
Nikolai Gushkov; Alexander Brinkov	Cosmonauts launched on December 5, 1968, in an attempt to beat Apollo 11 to the Moon with a planned landing in the Sea of Crises. The mission fails when contact with the spacecraft is abruptly lost. The launch is covered up by the Soviet authorities as an uncrewed launch in the Zond program until the spacecraft is re-discovered by the crew of the Space Shuttle Atlantis. Brinkov is described as a veteran of 6 previous missions and second only to Gagarin in the Soviet space program.		
Grandpa (unnamed) (CDR)	Grandpa Takes Me to the Moon (1996), picture book	Apollo; Unnamed CSM/LM	Contemporary
Grandpa (unnamed) (CDR)	Apollo astronaut tells his grandchild bedtime story about his trip to the Moon.		
Unnamed astronaut	"In the MSOB" (1996), short story	Apollo	c. 2020
Unnamed astronaut	The last surviving astronaut to walk on the Moon is euthanized in nursing home.		
Prospero One; Roly Gough, Wg Cdr (Commander); Geoff Lighthill, Dr Bob Nash (CAPCOM)	"Prospero One" (1996), short story	Prospero	April 26, 1974 (alternate history)
Prospero One; Roly Gough, Wg Cdr (Commander); Geoff Lighthill, Dr Bob Nash (CAPCOM)	Crew of the first independently launched British spacecraft. Story set in same alternate history as Stephen Baxter's Voyage (q.v.).		
Apollo 3? Alan York (USAF) Unknown program: Daniel Gary; Frederick March	Rats Saw God (1996), novel	Apollo	Contemporary
Apollo 3? Alan York (USAF) Unknown program: Daniel Gary; Frederick March	Moonwalker York has troubled teenage son.		
NASA: Ted Curval; Bob Gold (Scientist-astronaut) Apollo 11: Joseph Muldoon, Col. (LMP) X-15: Philip Stone, Maj. (USAF) Apollo/Moonlab: Charles Jones (CDR); James Dana; Phil Stone Moonlab/Soyuz: Grissom; Joe Muldoon, Col. (CDR); Adam Bleeker; Phil Stone; Komarov; Vladimir Pavlovich Viktorenko, Lt. Col. (Commander); Aleksandr Solovyov Apollo-N: Chuck Jones (CDR); Jim Dana (CMP); Ben Priest, Col.	Voyage (1996), novel	NASA: Apollo 11 NASA/USAF: X-15-1 NASA: Apollo/Moonlab: Enterprise (CSM); Moonlab (Wet Workshop) Moonlab/Soyuz: Grissom (CSM); Soyuz T-3 (Komarov); Moonlab Apollo-N (NERVA)	July 1969 (alternate history) October 27, 1969 (alternate history) August 1976 (alternate history) November–December 1980 (alternate history) November 28 – December 4, 1980 (alternate history)
NASA: Ted Curval; Bob Gold (Scientist-astronaut) Apollo 11: Joseph Muldoon, Col. (LMP) X-15: Philip Stone, Maj. (USAF) Apollo/Moonlab: Charles Jones (CDR); James Dana; Phil Stone Moonlab/Soyuz: Grissom; Joe Muldoon, Col. (CDR); Adam Bleeker; Phil Stone; Komarov; Vladimir Pavlovich Viktorenko, Lt. Col. (Commander); Aleksandr Solovyov Apollo-N: Chuck Jones (CDR); Jim Dana (CMP); Ben Priest, Col.	In alternate history, Muldoon is Apollo 11 LMP rather than Buzz Aldrin; Stone flies 200th and last mission of X-15 program in October 1969. Jones, Dana and Stone place Moonlab in lunar orbit in 1976. Soyuz T-3 (launched with N-1 rocket) docks with NASA Moonlab on December 1, 1980. Apollo-N, 1980 test flight of NERVA engine, ends in disaster.		
Apollo: Slade (CDR); Al Pond (CMP); Bado, Col. (USAF) (LMP) Apollo: Williams (no first name given); Unnamed astronaut Soviet mission: Unnamed cosmonaut Prometheus: Jim Richards, Capt. (RAF); Taine (no first name given)	"Moon Six" (1997), "Sun-Drenched" (1998), short stories	Apollo; Unnamed CSM/LM Apollo; Unnamed LM/Lunar Payload Module/Lunar Flying Unit Soviet lunar lander Royal Air Force: Prometheus (Alpha/Beta)	1970 (alternate histories)
Apollo: Slade (CDR); Al Pond (CMP); Bado, Col. (USAF) (LMP) Apollo: Williams (no first name given); Unnamed astronaut Soviet mission: Unnamed cosmonaut Prometheus: Jim Richards, Capt. (RAF); Taine (no first name given)	In "Moon Six", Bado finds himself shifting between parallel universes while on the Moon; in "Sun-Drenched", Slade and Bado are stranded on Moon when Command Module explodes in lunar orbit, killing Pond. Landing near Surveyor 7 or 8 landing site, near Tycho.		
Ivan Fiodorovich Istochnikov, Col.	Sputnik (1997), conceptual artwork	Soyuz 2	October 25, 1968
Ivan Fiodorovich Istochnikov, Col.	Istochnikov is discovered by Soyuz 3 to have vanished from capsule after apparent meteoroid strike.		
Charlie (CDR) (no last name given); James "Jays" Holland, Col. (USAF) (LMP)	"Moon-Calf" (1998), short story	Apollo; Unnamed CSM/LM	1990s (June)
Charlie (CDR) (no last name given); James "Jays" Holland, Col. (USAF) (LMP)	Twenty-five years after his sole spaceflight, moonwalker Holland visits strange chapel at Hereford Cathedral.		
Apollo 18: Bruce Cortney (CMP) Apollo 19: Gary Lucas (CDR); Victor Kendall (CMP); Charles Shepherd (LMP) Apollo 20: Bruce Cortney (CDR)	Ice (2002), novel	Apollo 18; Unnamed CSM/LM Apollo 19; Quest (CSM)/Starlight (LM) Apollo 20; Unnamed CSM/LM	February 1975
Apollo 18: Bruce Cortney (CMP) Apollo 19: Gary Lucas (CDR); Victor Kendall (CMP); Charles Shepherd (LMP) Apollo 20: Bruce Cortney (CDR)	Apollo 19 astronauts on a mission to the Aitken Basin; Apollo 20 recovery mission. Apollo 18 mission to Schröter's Valley in the Ocean of Storms is part of back-story.		
Apollo 19: Jeremiah "Jerry" Finch Backup crew: Gary Sprine; Flek Davis; Cud Wilson (backup to Finch)	Gentlemen of Space (2003), novel	Apollo 19; Unnamed CSM/LM	October 1975 – August 1976
Apollo 19: Jeremiah "Jerry" Finch Backup crew: Gary Sprine; Flek Davis; Cud Wilson (backup to Finch)	Earth science teacher Finch wins contest to become first ordinary person on Moon. July 1976 landing in Sea of Tranquility.		
Orbital mission: Sullivan Carew Moon landing: Wallace "Suitcase" Jefferson; Louis "Loopie Louie" Hayes Peter "Stinky Pete" Carver; Rocket Randall; Unnamed astronauts	The Old Negro Space Program (2003), short film	Negro American Space Society of Astronauts (NASSA)	1957–1966
Orbital mission: Sullivan Carew Moon landing: Wallace "Suitcase" Jefferson; Louis "Loopie Louie" Hayes Peter "Stinky Pete" Carver; Rocket Randall; Unnamed astronauts	African-American organization formed in response to lack of jobs for Black Americans at NASA. Moon landing on September 31, 1966.		
Apollo 18: Jake "Doggie Daddy" Deaver, Cmdr. (USN) (CDR); Augustus Julian "Augie" (Note: Also known as "Augie Doggie".) Blake, Col. (USMC) (LMP) Apollo (US/Soviet): Three unnamed astronauts/cosmonauts	The Orion Protocol (2003), novel	Apollo 18; Unnamed CSM/LM Apollo (US/Soviet mission); Unnamed CSM/LM	1973 December 1974
Apollo 18: Jake "Doggie Daddy" Deaver, Cmdr. (USN) (CDR); Augustus Julian "Augie" Blake, Col. (USMC) (LMP) Apollo (US/Soviet): Three unnamed astronauts/cosmonauts	Two-man crew of final official Apollo Moon mission investigates alien ruins in Sinus Medii. Secret US/Soviet follow-up mission, launched by Soviet Titan-class rocket, lands in Sinus Medii on December 25, 1974.		
Bucky Brandt	50 Ways to Leave Your Lover (a.k.a. How to Lose Your Lover) (2004), film	Apollo	Contemporary
Bucky Brandt	Astronaut who traveled to Moon is having his biography written.		
Robert Paradise	Paradise (2004), TV movie	Apollo	Contemporary
Robert Paradise	Apollo astronaut who becomes a televangelist after his return to Earth.		
Chet Aston	"Astronaut of the Year" (2005), short story	Apollo?	Contemporary
Chet Aston	Veteran of thirteen spaceflights has become lonely and rude in his old age.		
Timothy Vine	Cold Case "Debut" (2006), TV	Apollo	December 14, 1968 / 2006 (Winter)
Timothy Vine	Astronaut in line for Moon landing whose daughter is killed at debutante ball.		
Nick Tercel	Honeymoon With Mom (2006), TV movie	Apollo?	2005
Nick Tercel	Astronaut who walked on Moon in 1980 now owns island resort.		
Apollo 19?: Stephanie Ellis (Grumman) Apollo 20: Leona Marietta Snyder (Bell Labs) (CMP)	Apollo 20 hoax (2007), Internet hoax	Apollo 19 Apollo 20; Phoenix (LM)	February 1976 August 1976
Apollo 19?: Stephanie Ellis (Grumman) Apollo 20: Leona Marietta Snyder (Bell Labs) (CMP)	Man calling himself William Rutledge claimed he commanded US/Soviet Apollo 20 mission, launched from Vandenberg Air Force Base, with crewmates Snyder and Alexei Leonov. Alleged landing southwest of Delporte Crater on lunar farside.		
Voskhodyeniye; Yefgenii Yeremin	Ascent (2007), novel	Zond Project	July 1969
Voskhodyeniye; Yefgenii Yeremin	Soviet Korean War veteran launched on a secret mission to beat Apollo 11 to the Moon. When the mission fails he is erased from history.		
Clark Evans	"The Dream Life of Astronauts" (2007), short story	Apollo	1980s
Clark Evans	Unflown Apollo astronaut recruits gay teenager for sexual threesome.		
Richard Wade, Capt. (USAF); Mark Garris, Capt. (USAF); Michael Hagen, Capt. (USAF)	Fallout 3 (2008), video game	United States Space Administration (USSA): Valiant 11; Virgo II (Apollo and LK-like)	July 16, 1969 (alternate history)
Richard Wade, Capt. (USAF); Mark Garris, Capt. (USAF); Michael Hagen, Capt. (USAF)	In this video game taking place in 2277, exactly 200 years after a nuclear war, the player can visit the Museum of Technology in the ruins of Washington, D.C. The game (and the rest of the series) takes place in an alternate timeline that diverges from reality after World War II. As in our timeline, the United States was the first country to land humans on the Moon and did so starting in July 1969. The mission itself is slightly different to the one in reality as shown by the museum's Space Race exhibit. This fictional version of Apollo 11, known as "Valiant 11", was launched by the United States Space Administration (USSA), the timeline's version of NASA. All three astronauts on the mission were U.S. Air Force Captains, namely, Captain Richard Wade, Captain Mark Garris, and Captain Michael Hagen. The lunar module that flew them there was known as Virgo II and the date they landed on the Moon was July 16, 1969 (the same day Apollo 11 was launched in real life). The exhibit at the museum displays a replica of Virgo II which does not resemble the Apollo LM used in Apollo 11; instead it appears similar to the LK lunar module that was tested by the Soviets in the 1960s and 1970s but never carried humans to the Moon.		
Paul, Capt. (CMP); Jack (LMP) (no last names given)	The Spaceman (2009), novelet	Apollo 20; Artemis (CSM)/Raven (LM)	December 15–17, 1972 (alternate history) / Summer 1994
Paul, Capt. (CMP); Jack (LMP) (no last names given)	Command module loses contact with lunar module during J mission to Tycho commanded by Stu Roosa.		
Frank Allen (CDR); Unnamed CMP; Max Donnelly (LMP)	"The Cassandra Project" (2010), short story	Apollo; Unnamed CSM/LM	Late 1968
Frank Allen (CDR); Unnamed CMP; Max Donnelly (LMP)	Secret landing before Apollo 11 to investigate alien dome in Cassegrain Crater. Astronauts' names changed in 2012 novel adaptation.		
Apollo 18: Nathan Walker, Cmdr. (CDR); John Grey, Lt. Col. (CMP); Benjamin Anderson, Capt. (LMP) Thomas Young (CAPCOM) (Note: Not explicitly stated to be an astronaut.) LK Proton lander: Unnamed Russian cosmonaut	Apollo 18 (2011), film	Apollo 18; Freedom (CSM)/Liberty (LM) Soviet Union: LK Proton lander	December 1974
Apollo 18: Nathan Walker, Cmdr. (CDR); John Grey, Lt. Col. (CMP); Benjamin Anderson, Capt. (LMP) Thomas Young (CAPCOM) LK Proton lander: Unnamed Russian cosmonaut	Apollo 18 astronauts on top-secret DOD mission to the lunar south pole discover dead Russian cosmonaut and alien life.		
Vance Peterson, Col.	Adrift on the Sea of Rains (2012), novella	Apollo	Late 1980s (alternate history)
Vance Peterson, Col.	Commander of US military Moon base which follows on from, and uses hardware developed for, the Apollo program.		
Unnamed CSM/LM: Sidney Myshko (CDR); Brian Peters (CMP); Louie "Crash" Able (LMP) (Note: The book contradicts itself on whether Peters or Able was Myshko's LMP; see pp. 21 and 375.) Frank Kirby (CAPCOM) Unnamed CSM/LM: Aaron Walker (CDR); Amos Bartlett (CMP); Lenny Mullen (LMP)	The Cassandra Project (2012), novel	Apollo	January 11–21, 1969 April 1969
Unnamed CSM/LM: Sidney Myshko (CDR); Brian Peters (CMP); Louie "Crash" Able (LMP) Frank Kirby (CAPCOM) Unnamed CSM/LM: Aaron Walker (CDR); Amos Bartlett (CMP); Lenny Mullen (LMP)	Secret landings before Apollo 11 to investigate alien dome in Cassegrain Crater.		
Apollo 18: Robert Cartwright, Cmdr. (CDR); Steve Dayton, Maj. (CMP); Mason Gale (LMP) Rick Delahousse (CAPCOM) Rodinia: Boris Vasiliyevich Petrov, Col. (Commander); Alexander Ivanovich "Sasha" Kruchinkin (Cosmonaut-Engineer)	Sea of Crises (2012), novel	Apollo 18; Lexington (CSM)/Concord (LM) Soviet Union: Rodinia	September 1976 / contemporary
Apollo 18: Robert Cartwright, Cmdr. (CDR); Steve Dayton, Maj. (CMP); Mason Gale (LMP) Rick Delahousse (CAPCOM) Rodinia: Boris Vasiliyevich Petrov, Col. (Commander); Alexander Ivanovich "Sasha" Kruchinkin (Cosmonaut-Engineer)	Apollo 18 mission to Mare Crisium to investigate secret Soviet moonbase.		
Stas Arsenievich	The Cosmonaut (2013), film	Soviet Moonshot program Kolibri module (fictional)	c. 1970–1975
Stas Arsenievich	Only member of the first Soviet human mission to the Moon. He gets lost during the trip to the Moon; upon his return, he has been inexplicably transported to an alternate Earth.		
Unnamed astronaut	Louie "Model" (2014), TV	Apollo	Contemporary
Unnamed astronaut	Former astronaut who walked on Moon punches Louie after he injures his daughter.		
Project Apollo: Frank Goldwing, Capt. Unnamed astronauts Modern era: Scott Goldwing; Sam; Unnamed astronauts Carson Industries: Richard Carson III	Capture the Flag (2015), film	NASA: Apollo; Unnamed (CSM)/Falcon (LM) Carson Industries	Near future (2010s)
Project Apollo: Frank Goldwing, Capt. Unnamed astronauts Modern era: Scott Goldwing; Sam; Unnamed astronauts Carson Industries: Richard Carson III	When billionaire Carson attempts to claim the Moon for its helium-3 deposits, NASA launches an old Apollo spacecraft crewed by the retired Frank Goldwing, two children and a lizard to recover Apollo 11's US flag. Frank Goldwing was scheduled to fly on the last Apollo Moon mission but was dropped from the crew.		
Andrei Sergeyevich Ilith (sp?) (Note: Not explicitly stated to be a cosmonaut.); Unnamed cosmonaut	The Cosmonaut (2015), short film	Soyuz	c. 1970
Andrei Sergeyevich Ilith (sp?); Unnamed cosmonaut	Unnamed cosmonaut experiences emergency during spacecraft systems test.		
Edward R. Jones, Cmdr.	The Devout (2015), film	Apollo 1	Contemporary
Edward R. Jones, Cmdr.	Astronaut who died in Apollo 1 fire is possibly reincarnated as little girl.		
Alan York	iZombie "Patriot Brains", "Astroburger" (2015), TV	Apollo (unspecified flight)	Between 1969 and 1972
Alan York	Alan York is depicted as one of the first of the twelve men to have walked on the Moon. Cf. Rats Saw God above. (Note: Rats Saw God was written by Rob Thomas, the co-developer of the iZombie TV series.)		
Apollo 20: William "Memphis" Cato, Col. (CDR); Angela Phelps, Dr. (Geologist) (LMP) Clockwork Corp.: Unnamed pilots Other unnamed personnel	"Let Baser Things Devise" (2015), short story	Apollo 20; Unnamed CSM/LM Clockwork Corp.: Camelot Base	1975 2025
Apollo 20: William "Memphis" Cato, Col. (CDR); Angela Phelps, Dr. (Geologist) (LMP) Clockwork Corp.: Unnamed pilots Other unnamed personnel	Cato and Phelps were fatally stranded in Mare Serenitatis due to thruster failure and meteor impact. Fifty years later, an "uplifted" chimpanzee named Pierre and a robot discover Cato and Phelps' bodies while on mining mission. Apollo 19 is mentioned as also experiencing an emergency. Pierre and the robot fly to Moon aboard Russian rocket with American orbiter and Japanese lunar module.		
Salyut 4: Ilya Ilyushin, Maj. (Note: Incorrectly called "Captain" in author's note (p. 234).)	Astrotwins: Project Rescue (2016), novel	Soviet Union: Salyut 4 Soyuz Apollo: Crazy 9 (CSM) (Note: Jacket illustration depicts Gemini spacecraft, but text describes Apollo CSM.)	March 28 – April 13, 1976
Salyut 4: Ilya Ilyushin, Maj.	Twelve-year-old Scott and Mark Kelly fly spare Apollo CSM to rescue cosmonaut stranded on Salyut space station. Crazy 9 is launched by Titan II rocket powered by sugar-based solid propellant.		
Ulyana Markovskaya	The Last Dream for the Moon (2016), short film	Soviet Union: Zond L1-S3; Lunniy Korabl Z (lunar lander)	June 19 – 20, 1969 / 2009
Ulyana Markovskaya	Female cosmonaut returning from failed Moon mission crashes in Carpathian Mountains in Romania. Mission possibly launched using N1-L3 rocket.		
Robert Henley (CDR); Garris (CMP) (no first name given); Eric Dysart, Dr. (Prof.) (USN) (LMP)	The Rift: The Dark Side of the Moon (2016), film	Apollo	1976 / 2011
Robert Henley (CDR); Garris (CMP) (no first name given); Eric Dysart, Dr. (Prof.) (USN) (LMP)	Henley disappeared on final Apollo flight, a classified mission to lunar farside. Dysart was selected as one of the first NASA Scientist-Astronauts in 1965 and flew aboard Skylab in 1973.		
Unnamed astronaut	Apollo 18 (2017), short film	Apollo 18	September 24, 2015
Unnamed astronaut	Lone astronaut travels to Moon in order to fire bullet to destroy wasp hive on Earth.		
Kyle "Chip" Casperson	All the Beautiful Girls (2018), novel	NASA	Late 1967
Kyle "Chip" Casperson	Spaceflight veteran who has affair with Las Vegas showgirl Ruby Wilde.		
Avraham "Avi" Stein, Capt. (Hebrew: אברהם שטיין) (Israeli Air Force) Apollo 18: Dale "Penalty Box" Lunden, Capt. (Note: Later promoted to Colonel.) (USAF?) (CDR); Two unnamed astronauts	The Astronaut's Son (2018), novel	Apollo 18	1974 (September – November)
Avraham "Avi" Stein, Capt. (Hebrew: אברהם שטיין) (Israeli Air Force) Apollo 18: Dale "Penalty Box" Lunden, Capt. (USAF?) (CDR); Two unnamed astronauts	Israeli astronaut Stein, assigned to command Apollo 18, dies of apparent heart attack two days before scheduled launch. Vietnam veteran Lunden, previously assigned to command the mission, reclaims his spot after Stein's death. Apollo 18 launches on November 18, 1974.		
Apollo 18: Edward I. Lovett (CDR); Barton "Bo" Cunningham, Lt. Cmdr. (USN) (CMP); Albert R. Borden (Geologist) (LMP)	The Landing (2018), film	Apollo 18; Unnamed CSM/LM	May – June 1973 / 1998
Apollo 18: Edward I. Lovett (CDR); Barton "Bo" Cunningham, Lt. Cmdr. (USN) (CMP); Albert R. Borden (Geologist) (LMP)	Documentary made for 25th anniversary of Apollo 18 mission. Lovett and Cunningham were members of NASA Astronaut Group 2. Moon landing on May 26, 1973; Command Module overshoots splashdown target and lands in Taklamakan Desert in Northwest China on June 3, 1973.		
Unnamed astronaut(s)	One Hundred Hunters - A visit from the Moon (2018), music video	Gemini; Apollo	c. late 1960s/early 1970s
Unnamed astronaut(s)	Astronaut on Apollo mission investigates alien spheres on Moon; the same or another astronaut eventually disappears into portal in larger sphere.		
Johnson (no first name given)	Stuck; The Untold Story of Apollo 18 (2023), short film	Apollo 18	1970s?
Johnson (no first name given)	Astronaut on secret mission to plant fallen Apollo 11 flag upright.		

== See also ==
- Moon landings in fiction
- Moon in science fiction
- List of appearances of the Moon in fiction
