= Rat Saw God =

Rat Saw God may refer to:

- Rat Saw God (Veronica Mars), second-season episode of Veronica Mars
- Rat Saw God (album), 2023 album by Wednesday

== See also ==
- Rats Saw God, 1996 young adult novel by Rob Thomas
