= Chris Parr =

English theatre director and television executive (1943–2023)

Chris Parr (25 September 1943 – 24 November 2023) was a English theatre director and television drama producer and executive.

== Life and career ==
Chris Parr grew up in Littlehampton, Sussex. He was educated at Chichester High School for Boys, where his contemporaries included Howard Brenton, David Wood and the late David Horlock, and Queen's College, Oxford, to which he won an Open Scholarship to read Classics. However, he left Oxford without a degree but with the intention of making a career in the theatre. From 1969 to 1972, Parr was the first Fellow in Theatre at the University of Bradford. During this period he worked closely with Bradford University Drama Group, directing or producing new plays by writers, notably Howard Brenton, David Edgar and Richard Crane, who were already getting, or were about to get, attention on a national level. From 1975 to 1981 he was Artistic Director of the Traverse Theatre, Edinburgh, where he ran the Royal Court Theatre's Sunday Night Programme and developed and regularly directed plays by new and emerging Scottish playwrights. Writers such as John Byrne and Tom McGrath emerged in this time.

In 1994, he was appointed head of drama at BBC Birmingham, and in the same year he produced the serial Takin' Over the Asylum, which won a BAFTA award. In 1995 he moved to the BBC's central drama department in London to become Head of Drama Series. By 2002, he had moved to Thames Television as head of drama.

Parr died from pneumonia on 24 November 2023, at the age of 80. At the time of his death he was also suffering from Parkinson's disease.

== Credits ==
=== as Director ===
- Revenge by Howard Brenton (Royal Court Theatre Upstairs, 1969)
- Gum and Goo by Howard Brenton, Bradford University Theatre Group, 1969–70
- Heads by Howard Brenton, University of Bradford Drama Group, 1969
- The Education of Skinny Spew by Howard Brenton, University of Bradford Drama Group, 1969
- Triple Bill: Laughs etc, History of a Poor Old Man and The Old Jew (Soho Theatre, 1970)
- Two Kinds of Angels (Bradford, 1970)
- Inquisition (Soho Theatre, 1971)
- A Fart for Europe (Theatre Upstairs, 1973)
- True-Life (Soho Theatre, 1973)
- New Reekie (Traverse Theatre, 1977)
- A&R (Traverse Theatre, 1977)
- Rents (Traverse Theatre, 1979)
- The Case of David Anderson QC (Traverse Theatre, 1980)
- The Long March (BBC Television, 1983)
- The Rainbow (BBC Television)
- Heartlanders (Birmingham Community Theatre, 1989)
- Kings of the Road (Edinburgh Festival, Ambassadors Dublin, Winchester Theatre Royal, Greenwich Theatre, 2003)
- The Musical (Edinburgh Festival, 2004)

=== as Producer ===
- Children of the North (BBC Northern Ireland, 1991)
- You, Me & Marley (BBC, 1992)
- Martin Chuzzlewit (BBC, 1994)
- Takin' Over the Asylum (BBC Scotland, 1994)
- Beech Is Back (ITV, 2001)
- Falling (ITV, 2005)

=== as Executive Producer ===
- Preston Front II (BBC, 1995)
- Wing and a Prayer (Channel 5, 1999)
- The Bill (ITV, 2002)
- Promoted to Glory (ITV, 2003)

=== as Commissioning Editor ===
- Dangerfield (BBC)
- Preston Front (BBC)
- Backup (BBC)
- Dalziel and Pascoe (BBC)
- Cruel Train (BBC)

== Sources ==
- 'New Challenge at BBC' Bradford University News and Views, November 1995. Retrieved 3 December 2005.
