= Children of the North =

British television series

- Patrick Malahide and Michael Gough as Colonel Mailer and Arthur Apple
- Genre: Thriller
- Based on: Children of the North by M.S. Power
- Written by: John Hale
- Directed by: David Drury
- Starring: Patrick Malahide; Michael Gough; Tony Doyle; John Kavanagh; Adrian Dunbar; Paul Brooke; Jonathan Hyde; Ian McElhinney; Sean Caffrey
- Composer: Geoffrey Burgon
- Country of origin: United Kingdom
- Original language: English
- No. of series: 1
- No. of episodes: 4

Production
- Producer: Chris Parr
- Production locations: Belfast, Northern Ireland
- Cinematography: Alec Curtis
- Editor: Ian Farr
- Running time: 55 minutes
- Production company: BBC Northern Ireland

Original release
- Network: BBC2
- Release: 30 October – 20 November 1991

Children of the North is a British television thriller drama series written by John Hale that first broadcast on BBC2 between 30 October 20 November 1991. The series comprising four episodes was based on the novel trilogy The Killing of Yesterday's Children, Lonely the Man Without Heroes and A Darkness in the Eye by author M.S. Power. All four episodes were directed by David Drury, with Chris Parr acting as executive producer.

The series starred Patrick Malahide as Colonel Mailer, an MI5 agent whose chauffeur is killed during an IRA assassination attempt on Mailer and Michael Gough as Arthur Apple, a bookie who launders money for the IRA.

== Production ==
According to a Sydney Morning Herald review, Malahide's character is "nearing retirement from a shattering life in military intelligence". Tony Doyle, Adrian Dunbar, and John Kavanagh co-starred with Malahide and Gough. The original BBC plotline for the series read, "When two MI6 officers are shot dead in an unmarked car, assassination attempts, money laundering operations and peace talks follow as hitman Martin Deeley (Adrian Dunbar) is simultaneously chased by members of the IRA, the RUC, and the army".

Behind-the-scenes production photos were later uploaded on social media website Pinterest by the owner of the land where part of the series was filmed.

== Cast ==
- Patrick Malahide as Colonel Mailer; a military intelligence operative
- Michael Gough as Arthur Apple; a bookie who launders money for the IRA
- Tony Doyle as John Axton; an RUC Special Branch officer
- John Kavanagh as Seamus Reilly; an IRA 'godfather'
- Adrian Dunbar as Martin Deeley; an assassin

=== Recurring ===
- Paul Brooke as Ballister
- Jonathan Hyde as Colonel Shrapnel
- Ian McElhinney as O'Hare
- Sean Caffrey as IRA Chief of Staff
- John Hewitt as Moran
- Frankie McCafferty as Fergal
- Brian McGrath as McIlliver
- Tony Byrne as Dowling

== Episodes ==
| No. | Title | Directed by | Written by | Original release date |
|---|---|---|---|---|
| 1 | "The Killing of Yesterday's Children" | David Drury | John Hale | 30 October 1991 |
Two MI6 officers are shot in a car near the border. Colonel Mailer, in harness with RUC Special Branch officer John Axton, hunts the marksman. IRA godfather Seamus Reilly pulls young Martin Deeley out of active service and recruits the old, eccentric Arthur Apple.
| 2 | "Lonely the Man Without Heroes" | David Drury | John Hale | 6 November 1991 |
Deeley is hunted by the Army, RUC and IRA. Apple's plan to shield him is ingenious – but will it work? Mailer comes into his office to a big surprise.
| 3 | "City of Maloch" | David Drury | John Hale | 13 November 1991 |
Axton and Reilly collaborate to stop Shrapnel's assassination squad. Colonel Mailer is called back from retirement to the Province – at the IRA's request.
| 4 | "A Darkness with the Eye" | David Drury | John Hale | 20 November 1991 |
Reilly's peace moves get a response from the government but are threatened by a rogue unit within his ranks.
