= Falling (Howard novel) =

1999 British novel by Elizabeth Jane Howard

- First edition
- Author: Elizabeth Jane Howard
- Published: 1999 (Macmillan)
- ISBN: 0-330-36889-3

Falling is a 1999 novel by British writer Elizabeth Jane Howard. It was later filmed as a drama for ITV.

== Plot summary ==
Set in the Cotswolds, the novel tells the story of a relationship that develops between Henry Kent, a sociopath and fantasist who preys on lonely rich women, and Daisy Langrish, an ageing novelist with two broken marriages behind her.

After meeting Daisy—who has recently bought a cottage in order to start a new life in the country—Henry quickly falls in love with her, and sets about tricking his way into her confidence.

He initially offers to become her gardener—something she reluctantly accepts—then later begins to correspond with her after she suffers an accident during a prolonged trip abroad. These letters start as run of the mill pieces, but as he perceives that she is taking an interest in him, Henry begins to weave her a series of elaborate stories about his life, designed to gain her attention and win her affection.

When Daisy eventually returns home and Henry makes himself indispensable to her after she suffers a fall, they begin an affair. But when Daisy's family and friends learn about the nature of the relationship, they become concerned and start to investigate Henry. However, they soon begin to fear that the facts they unearth about his past might have come to light too late to save Daisy from harm.

Howard wrote this novel based on her real life affair with a con-man, as described in her memoir, Slipstream.

== Television adaptation ==
Falling
- Based on: Falling
- Written by: Elizabeth Jane Howard
- Screenplay by: Andrew Davies
- Directed by: Tristram Powell
- Starring: Michael Kitchen; Penelope Wilton; Micaiah Dring; Philip McGinley; Thomas Lockyer; Neil Armstrong; Thomas McNulty; Eleanor Tomlinson; Joanna David; Alexandra Moen; Sylvestra Le Touzel; Malcolm Sinclair; Michael Wardle; David Tarkenter; Ella Vale; Penny Downie

Production
- Executive producer: Keith Richardson
- Producer: Chris Parr
- Running time: 97 minutes
- Production company: Granada Yorkshire

Original release
- Network: ITV1
- Release: 6 March 2005

The book was made into a drama for ITV set in Yorkshire, starring Michael Kitchen and Penelope Wilton. It was directed by Tristram Powell, and produced by Chris Parr, with the screenplay being written by Andrew Davies. It was produced by Granada Yorkshire, and was broadcast on the 6 March 2005 on ITV1.

Bill Nighy was originally considered for the role of Henry Kent.

=== Cast ===
- Michael Kitchen - Henry Kent
- Penelope Wilton - Daisy Langrish
- Micaiah Dring - Lily Palmer
- Philip McGinley - Young Henry
- Thomas Lockyer - Jason Redfearn
- Neil Armstrong - Henry's Father
- Thomas McNulty - Little Henry
- Eleanor Tomlinson - Little Daphne
- Joanna David - Lady Carteret
- Alexandra Moen - Daphne
- Sylvestra Le Touzel - Anna Blackstone
- Malcolm Sinclair - Anthony
- Michael Wardle - Doctor
- David Tarkenter - Stanislaw Varensky
- Ella Vale - Charley
- Penny Downie - Hazel

=== Filming and production ===
Filming took place in Autumn 2004, in locations across Leeds, Wakefield, Bradford, Pendle, along with the Leeds and Liverpool Canal across Yorkshire and Lancashire. Specific Bradford locations include Menston Library, High Royds Hospital, and the UNESCO world heritage neighbourhood of Saltaire. Specific Pendle locations include Greenberfield Locks in Barnoldswick, and J&J News at 102 Colne Road in Earby.
