= Alexandra Moen =

Italian-born English actress (born 1978)

- Born: Alexandra Phoebe Moen; 1978 (age 47–48); Pisa, Tuscany, Italy
- Occupation: Actress
- Years active: 2003–present

Alexandra Moen (born 1978) is an Italian-born English actress, known for her roles as Emily James in the drama series Hotel Babylon, Tamsin in the drama series Tripping Over, and Lucy Saxon in the science fiction series Doctor Who.

== Early life ==
Moen was born in Pisa, Tuscany, Italy, the daughter of an oceanographer father and teacher mother. Along with her two younger brothers, the family lived briefly in Canada and Bermuda, until moving to the United Kingdom in 1991. She studied English at Leeds University, later going on to train at the London Academy of Music and Dramatic Art (LAMDA).

== Filmography ==
=== Film ===
Year	Film	Role	Notes
2005	.357	Mel	Short film
2012	Bert and Dickie	Rosalind Burnell	
2015	The Haunting of Ellie Rose	Chloe	
2018	A Private War	Zoe	
2024	Wider Than the Sky	Ann	Short film

=== Television ===
Year	Film	Role	Notes
2004	Foyle's War	Mary Wrenn	Episode: "Enemy Fire"
2005	Falling	Daphne	TV film
2005	Whatever Love Means	Princess Anne	TV film
2005	Midsomer Murders	Emma Kirby	Episode: "Second Sight"
2006	Tripping Over	Tamsin Dalgliesh	6 episodes
2007, 2009	Doctor Who	Lucy Saxon	Episodes: "The Sound of Drums", "Last of the Time Lords", "The End of Time: Part One"
2008	Waking the Dead	Cathy Reading	Episodes: "Sins: Part 1", "Sins: Part 2"
2008–2009	Hotel Babylon	Emily James	16 episodes
2010	Doctors	Laura Thomas	Episode: "Five Seconds"
2010	Casualty	Alison Firth	Episode: "Truth Will Out"
2010–2012	Strike Back	Kerry Stonebridge	9 episodes
2013	Luther	Eve	Episode #3.2
2013	Death Comes to Pemberley	Jane Bingley	Episode #1.2
2015–2016	Dickensian	Frances Barbary	20 episodes
2015–2018	Fortitude	Petra Bergen	24 episodes
2017	The Last Trace	Jacqueline Reeve	TV film
2018	Into the Badlands	Allisto	Episode: "Chapter XX: Blind Cannibal Assassins"
2019	The Spanish Princess	Queen Elizabeth of York	3 episodes
2019	Dublin Murders	Simone Cameron	5 episodes
2020–2022	Industry	Candice Allbright	2 episodes
2022	The Ipcress File	Mrs. Dalby	6 episodes
2023	Domina	Turia	2 episodes
2024	Too Good to Be True	Olivia	Episode #1.3
2024	A Gentleman in Moscow	Gloria	Episode: "Adieu"
2026	House of the Dragon	Sharis Footly	Episode: "Tumbleton"

=== Stage ===
Year	Title	Role	Venue	Notes
2002	Macbeth	Witch	Albery Theatre, London	
2003	The Hinge of the World	Marie Celeste	Yvonne Arnaud Theatre, Guildford	
2003	The Merchant of Venice	Jessica	Chichester Festival Theatre, Chichester	
2003	The Seagull	Nina	Chichester Festival Theatre, Chichester	
2005	Look Back in Anger	Helena	Royal Lyceum Theatre, Edinburgh	
2005	The Shoreditch Madonna	Christina	Soho Theatre, London	
2005	Phaedra's Love	Strophe	Bristol Old Vic, Bristol	
2012	The Lady from the Sea	Hilde	Rose Theatre Kingston, Kingston upon Thames	
