= Tripping Over =

- Genre: Drama
- Created by: Andrew Knight; Andrea Denholm; Mike Bullen
- Directed by: Sam Miller; Ian Watson
- Starring: Kathryn Drysdale; Abe Forsythe; Daniel MacPherson; Alexandra Moen; Leon Ockenden
- Composer: Shane O'Mara
- Countries of origin: Australia; United Kingdom
- No. of seasons: 1
- No. of episodes: 6

Production
- Executive producers: Andrew Knight; Mike Bullen
- Producers: Andrea Denholm; Sue Seeary; Tim Whitby
- Running time: 45 minutes
- Production company: Corner Stone Films

Original release
- Network: Network Ten
- Release: 25 October – 29 November 2006
- Network: Channel 5
- Release: 30 October – 4 December 2006

Tripping Over is a British/Australian six-part drama series. Its first episode aired on Network Ten in Australia on 25 October 2006, and in the United Kingdom on Five on 30 October 2006. In the UK Tripping Over is repeated on Five Life.

The show is about three friends in London and two friends in Sydney; neither group knows the other but their parents do. They both take flights to the others' country, and the two groups meet at the stop-over in Bangkok, where a tragic event changes their lives.

The series then follows the two groups as they continue on their trips and back home. The programme focuses on the major life changes that occur during the mid-20s, and how choices made here can affect a person's life for many years to come.

== Summary ==
Five young people converge for a one night stop-over in Bangkok. Whether it was destined or just a stuff up, what happens there binds them together and profoundly alters the direction of their lives. The series follows the group, both together and separately, as they travel to each other's countries or return home some to reinvent themselves, others to find themselves. Woven through their stories are the lives of an older, but not necessarily wiser generation—still living the mistakes of their own 20s. Only one thing is certain, whatever your age, everything looks different from 11,000 miles away.

== Cast ==
- Alexandra Moen as Tamsin Dalgliesh
- Daniel MacPherson as Ned Frost
- Abe Forsythe as Nic Kirkh
- Leon Ockenden as Callum
- Kathryn Drysdale as Lizzie
- Oliver Chris as Sam
- Rebecca Gibney as Lydia
- Lisa McCune as Annabel
- Paul McGann as Jeremy Frost
- Brooke Satchwell as Felicity
- Ramon Tikaram as Jim/Robbie
- Nicholas Bell as James Frost
- Jacek Koman as Magnus
- Bob Franklin
- Gareth Yuen as Charlie
- Georgina Naidu as Dr Ngabo
- Daniel Amalm as Brad
- Ian Bliss as Ken

== Production ==
- Conceived in 2003 by Andrew Knight and Andrea Denholm, who discussed the idea with Mike Bullen while on a weekend trip. Knight and Denholm wanted to make a series about the difference between backpacking in 1976 and 2006.
- Filmed from 8 May to 11 August 2006.

== Episodes ==
No.	Title	Directed by	Written by	Original release date	Original UK air date
1	"Episode 1"	Sam Miller	Andrew Knight & Andrea Denholm	25 October 2006	30 October 2006
Five young travellers meet in Bangkok where a tragic incident changes the direction of their lives. On her way to Australia, London lawyer Tamsin meets friends Lizzie and Callum for a one-night stop over in Bangkok. Joining them are Australians Ned and Nic, on their way to London. When a tragic accident proves life is fleeting, emotions rise to the surface, prompting a devastating confession, impulsive decisions and itinerary changes.
2	"Episode 2"	Sam Miller	Andrew Knight & Matt King	1 November 2006	6 November 2006
Tamsin finds it difficult to be excited about life in Sydney and is tempted when her fiancé appears, offering to take her home. Ned is dealt a major bombshell by his father. Callum throws himself into Sydney's gay scene but his enthusiasm appears to be a smoke screen for something darker. Homeless, Nic jumps at the chance to board with a fellow teacher and his family until he learns they have an unnatural obsession.
3	"Episode 3"	Sam Miller	Andrea Denholm, Anna Funder & Andrew Knight	8 November 2006	13 November 2006
Nic is blackmailed by the student he had sex with, while Lizzie attempts to put Dave's ghost to rest. As Tamsin's work fortunes change for the better, Jeremy returns to Australia to have it out with Lydia. And Callum has a sexual indiscretion of his own when a kinky stunt goes horribly wrong.
4	"Episode 4"	Ian Watson	Andrea Denholm & Andrew Knight	15 November 2006	20 November 2006
Ned finally lands a role in a 'cutting edge' play and treats it with all the seriousness he thinks it affords - to his own detriment. Meanwhile, in an effort to turn his luck around, Nic works at a plan involving his thesis on probability in the airline industry. Lizzie is surprised when Robbie tracks her down. Tamsin faces Jeremy in court and struggles with her conscience.
5	"Episode 5"	Ian Watson	Andrew Knight	22 November 2006	27 November 2006
Just when Tamsin accepts that her career is over, she is granted a last-minute reprieve by an unexpected source. Callum is shocked to learn Charlie is engaged. Magnus reveals he has feelings for Lydia. In London, Ned agrees to pose as Lizzie's boyfriend for her domineering sister, and ultimately finds himself enjoying the charade. Nic struggles to adapt to the corporate environment of his new job while trying to prove himself, all the while wondering if his high flying career is over before it began.
6	"Episode 6"	Ian Watson	Andrew Knight	29 November 2006	4 December 2006
As Tamsin prepares for her wedding, she tries to convince herself it's the right thing to do. Nic works hard to convince himself he belongs with Flick. But when Tamsin and Nic find themselves alone together, their actions suggest otherwise. Ned finally admits an attraction to Lizzie but his desire to reignite his career proves an obstacle.
