= The Cosmonaut =

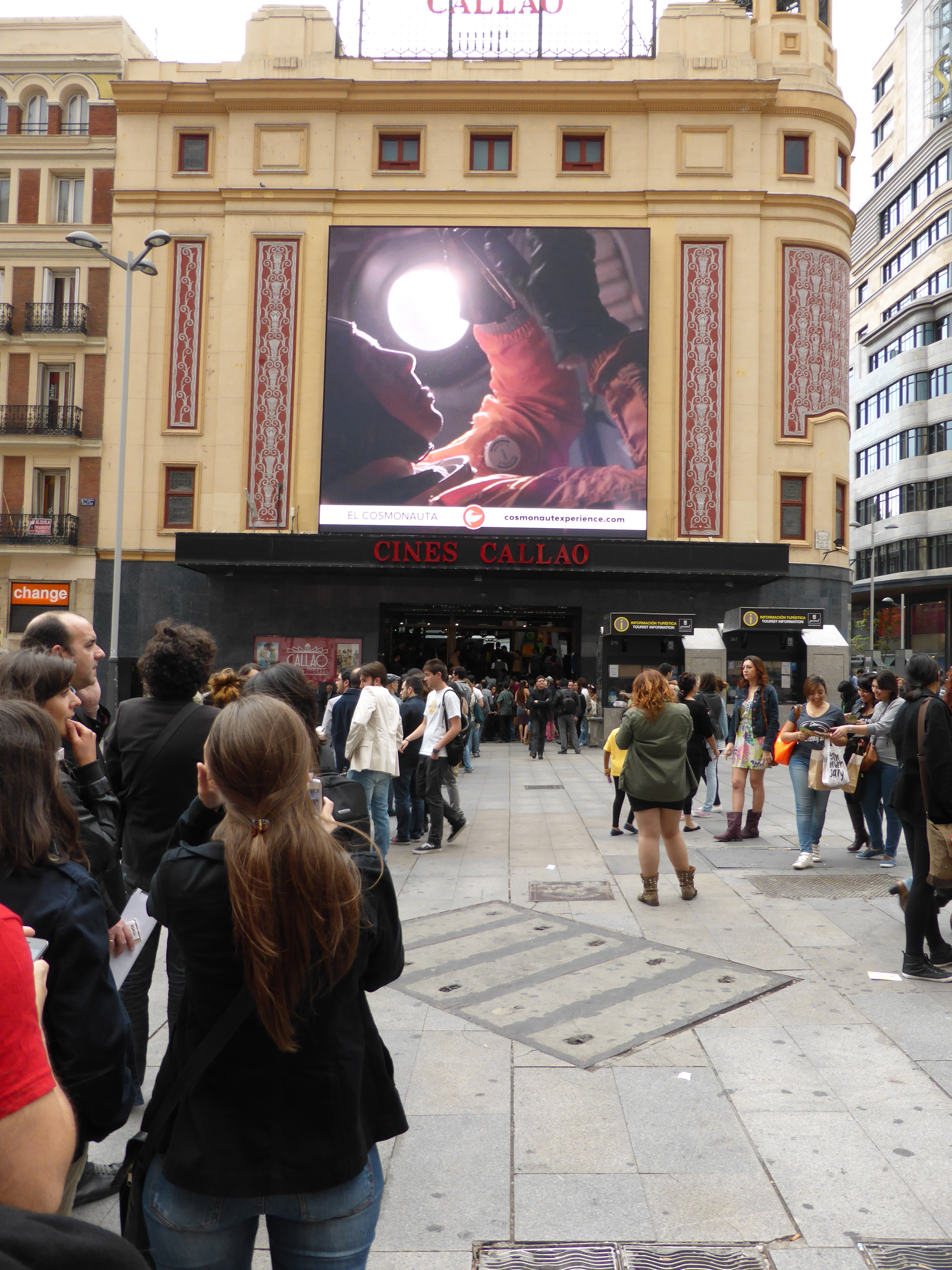
- Premiere in Madrid in May 2013
- Directed by: Nicolás Alcalá
- Produced by: Carola Rodríguez; Bruno Teixidor
- Starring: Katrine De Candole; Leon Ockenden; Max Wrottesley
- Cinematography: Luis Enrique Carrión
- Edited by: Carlos Serrano Azcona; Nicolas Alcalá
- Music by: Joan Valent
- Release date: 9 May 2013 (Las Palmas Film Festival)
- Running time: 93 minutes.
- Country: Spain
- Language: English
- Budget: €860,000

The Cosmonaut (El Cosmonauta) is a Spanish science-fiction film directed by Nicolás Alcalá and produced by Carola Rodríguez and Bruno Teixidor. It premiered in May 2013. As the first feature-length project of Riot Cinema Collective, it is notable for its use of crowdfunding and a Creative Commons license during production.

The film was released free online on May 14th, 2013 under a Creative Commons license.

== Plot ==
In 1967, two young friends, Stas and Andrei, arrive at the newly constructed Star City near Moscow, where the first cosmonauts trained. Here, a race against the clock to beat the Americans into space is taking place.

Stas and Andrei witness first-hand the political intrigue, power struggles, and the successes and failures of the Soviet Union in achieving some of the 20th century's greatest milestones. They meet Yulia, a communications technician, with whom they form a strong bond—always bordering on love but never fully realized.

=== Influences ===
The Cosmonaut's conception and filmmaking approach draw from the works of some of the world's most renowned filmmakers. The project's dossier specifically mentions Wong Kar-wai (and his frequent collaborator Christopher Doyle), Andrei Tarkovsky, José Luis Guerín, and Robert Bresson as key influences. There are numerous thematic and narrative links to Andrei Tarkovsky's works, including the exploration of memory, lost love, and reality. The names of the two main characters, Andrei and Stas Arsenievich, even reflect Tarkovsky's name and patronymic.

Further connections to Tarkovsky are evident in the collaborators’ list, which includes names like Eduard Artemyev and Marina Tarkovskaya, Tarkovsky's sister. The fictional Program K, featuring a hummingbird icon used prominently in the film's promotion, is inspired by real Soviet efforts to send a cosmonaut to the Moon.

== Production ==
The idea for The Cosmonaut originated from two main sources: the conversations between Nicolás Alcalá and Bruno Teixidor (the primary creative minds behind the project's visual design) about conspiracies, Lost Cosmonauts theories, and the Soviet space program; and the poetry book Poetics for Cosmonauts by Henry Pierrot. While the main plot core underwent numerous revisions during development, key elements—such as the return of an astronaut to Earth after a long trip to the Moon—remained intact. After reading Poetics for Cosmonauts, the script evolved into its current form. Preproduction for the short film began in October–November 2008.

=== 2009 ===
In January 2009, the project underwent its most significant transformation: it transitioned from being a traditionally produced short film into a feature-length film funded through crowdfunding and distributed for free under a Creative Commons Attribution-ShareAlike License.

==== Crowdfunding ====
Inspired by productions such as A Swarm of Angels and Artemis Eternal, The Cosmonaut is the first Spanish feature film that makes use of the crowdfunding financing method. There were two ways to get involved in The Cosmonaut’s production:

- First, as a regular producer. From an initial contribution of 2 euros, a contributor may be listed as a “producer” in the film credits, receiving a welcome pack, and a ticket for the drawing of one of the cosmonauts’ suits that will be used in the film. Further investments could be used to buy merchandising items in the film's online store.
- Secondly, as a movie investor. From an initial investment of 100 euros, a contributor can own a percentage of the film's profits.

Being a cinematographic project whose spread is based mostly in the use of social networks, and synergy between audience and creators, the network material of the movie is centered mostly in the creation of a fan community. Producers, regardless of their monetary participation in the film, form part of Programme K, a social group in which they can relate between each other, follow the development of the film, and take advantage of special perks and draws for Programme K members.

==== Release ====
The film, when finished, will be released on the Internet available for download and in HD. Also, besides the full movie on HD, all raw footage shot during the movie's filming will be uploaded too. As the film is licensed under a Creative Commons Attribution-ShareAlike License, the users will be able to download, lend, re-cut or use the film footage in any way they wish. This way, the audience not only will be allowed, but also encouraged by the producers themselves, to create new versions of the film and other derivative works.

=== 2010 ===
Between December 2009 and June 2010, the Riot Cinema team worked in modernizing the previous business model. On 2 June 2010, the new model, called “The Plan”, was launched in a press conference by the people in charge of the company. It provides the project with some developments. These developments increase the project approach and infrastructure, keeping its previous features, but, in general, taking them a step further.

==== Crowdfunding and financing ====
A totally new funding plan is introduced in the business model. While in the old model the film funding was through crowdfunding and private investment, in “The Plan”, a three-staged progressive plan is detailed, in which there is room for private financing, crowdfunding, sponsorization, and distribution presales. Even though the new three-staged model (in which the first stage would be the first year of the project) keeps crowdfunding and private investment as funding means, their role in the project varies: economically, crowdfunding carries less weight than in the first draft of the project. Nevertheless, its use is kept due to the weight such a completely developed infrastructure has in keeping and strengthening a fan community. Regarding private investment, it keeps the same operational system, but the owned profits per invested money ratio vary depending on the project stage. According to Riot Cinema data, of the €860,000 the project will cost, it is expected that 6.5% be financed through crowdfunding and/or merchandising, 21% by private investment, 32% through sponsorship, and 40.5% through presales distribution (approximate figures).

==== Yuri's Night ====
One of the examples of the application of the new sponsorship option was available in the party carried out during the 2010 Yuri's Night. Since Yuri Gagarin is a kind of mascot of the project, the people in charge of the film worked in collaboration with LEEM for months in order to join the world initiatives celebrated in Yuri's Night. It also happened to celebrate the achievement of 2000 producers of the film.

==== Distribution and transmedia ====
In the same way, the movie distribution model has also changed. The project has suffered more noticeable changes in its distribution channels and in the final completion of the project. Regarding distribution, the new plan's objective is the simultaneous premiere in all release windows. The philosophy behind this decision is to allow the user to choose the format he wants to watch the movie. Different particularities have been adopted for each release window, taking each mean into account, but making some changes in the traditional way of distribution. For instance, the release on the Internet will still be totally free and in HD, while the TV release will have an alternative ending for that channel. In the same way, the people in charge of the movie have designed a special presentation in cinemas to encourage people to go the theaters. This is called “The Cosmonaut Experience”, and it merges performance elements with recreational interaction with the audience, classic screening and a traveling tour, in order to provide the audience, according to the creators, with an added "experience". This tour of screenings will not replace the traditional screening in cinemas, but it will be done at the same time.

The Cosmonaut, regarding its current completion, is no longer a science fiction feature film. Following the steps of franchises such as The Matrix or Lost, The Cosmonaut will be a transmedia project with ramifications in different fields. It is planned to make a series of webisodes, mobile content, or even an ARG, among others. Each series of content will show its own perspective of a story included in the film. It won't be necessary to watch them in order to understand the given facts, but it will provide some data and information about The Cosmonaut world that will complement each other.

=== 2011 ===
An update of the business model ("The Plan 2") was presented in October 2011, once shooting was finished.

The Cosmonaut is one of the most successful crowdfunding projects in history with about €300,000.

==== Save The Cosmonaut ====
After having raised €120,000 during the first two years, the decision was taken to shoot with that money together with €120,000 more contributed by a Russian co-producer. One week before shooting, when all the tickets were purchased and all the reservations made, the co-producer had to withdraw. A desperate campaign was then launched requesting the community to help save the movie.

More than 600 people contributed a total of €131,000 in 3 days, beating all the world crowdfunding records in such a short period of time, and allowing the film to be shot. With such a huge success, the possibility of investing was kept during the entirety of shooting. A streaming window was created so the investors could watch the shooting they had made possible live.

Lánzanos, the Spanish crowdfunding platform that collaborated during the whole campaign, faced, together with The Cosmonaut's team, what they called "their most beautiful failure of design": the raising status bar exceeded 173%, going beyond the box it was embedded in. The same happened on the film website.

== Media coverage and reception ==
After over a year of promotion, the project received certain degree of attention from the national media in Spain. There were reports about the film in various television channels of the country: TVE, in the news program of LaSexta, CNN+ and Cuatro, and in a divulgative program of La 2. [20]; as well as in different newspapers, magazines and radios: El País, El Mundo, ABC, Público, AND, La Gaceta, Fotogramas, Cadena Ser, los 40 Principales. We can also find among these the Spanish edition of Cahiers du Cinéma. The main coverage of the project, however, came through the Internet. A great quantity of blogs and web based media dedicated articles to the film, between them some of the most influential blogs of Spain. Some examples of this include the digital version of El País, the daily newspaper with the biggest print run in the country, or Microsiervos, one of the most visited blogs in Spanish. The media reaction wasn't limited to Spain: some English-speaking blogs wrote about the project as well.

=== CosmoNauts concert ===
Most of the media attention towards the project was generated after a two-day music festival. The festival, named "CosmoNauts", was announced in The Cosmonaut blog on 9 June 2009. It was organized as a mass event to promote the film; during two days (29 and 30 June), nine bands belonging to the indie scene of Madrid played in front of an audience that, according to the organization, reached 400 people between the two days, with the emerging filmmaker Nacho Vigalondo as the master of ceremonies. The concert, held in Madrid in the Sala Heineken, wasn't able to fill the seating capacity of the concert hall, mainly due to schedule hardships (the concert was held in the middle of a working week, and at the end of the month), and the organization's inexperience. While it was a mild economic failure, the organizers of the concert ascribe the subsequent promotional success of the movie and the later peak of sales in the online store to the festival, and, therefore, consider it a success.

=== Travelling at zero gravity ===
The Cosmonaut team, in collaboration with Improba Spain (the collective of followers of Improv Everywhere in Spain), carried out a promotional flashmob on 29 January 2010, in Puerta del Sol, Madrid. The object of the event was to simulate a Moon landing in downtown Madrid, and it had a remarkable attendance, even some of the passers-by joined the performance.

== Controversy ==
The crowdfunding movie project The Cosmonaut has suffered a serious PR drawback due to a public relationship problem related to the director and writer, Nicolás Alcalá. In his response (which he made public) to a resume from a man named "Carlos", Alcalá made some very peculiar remarks about the structure of the email and its purpose. Thus, with the intention of humiliating this man, he made comments, such as: "If you are a fishmonger, tell us, we have a job for you." (It can be read in Spanish here.) Spanish social media responded very harshly to the public comment, with multiple reactions across the web, and thousands of angry responses on their blogs, leading to a public declaration from the director where he made a public apology for his comments.

== See also ==
- Crowdsourcing
