= Leon Ockenden =

English actor, director and writer

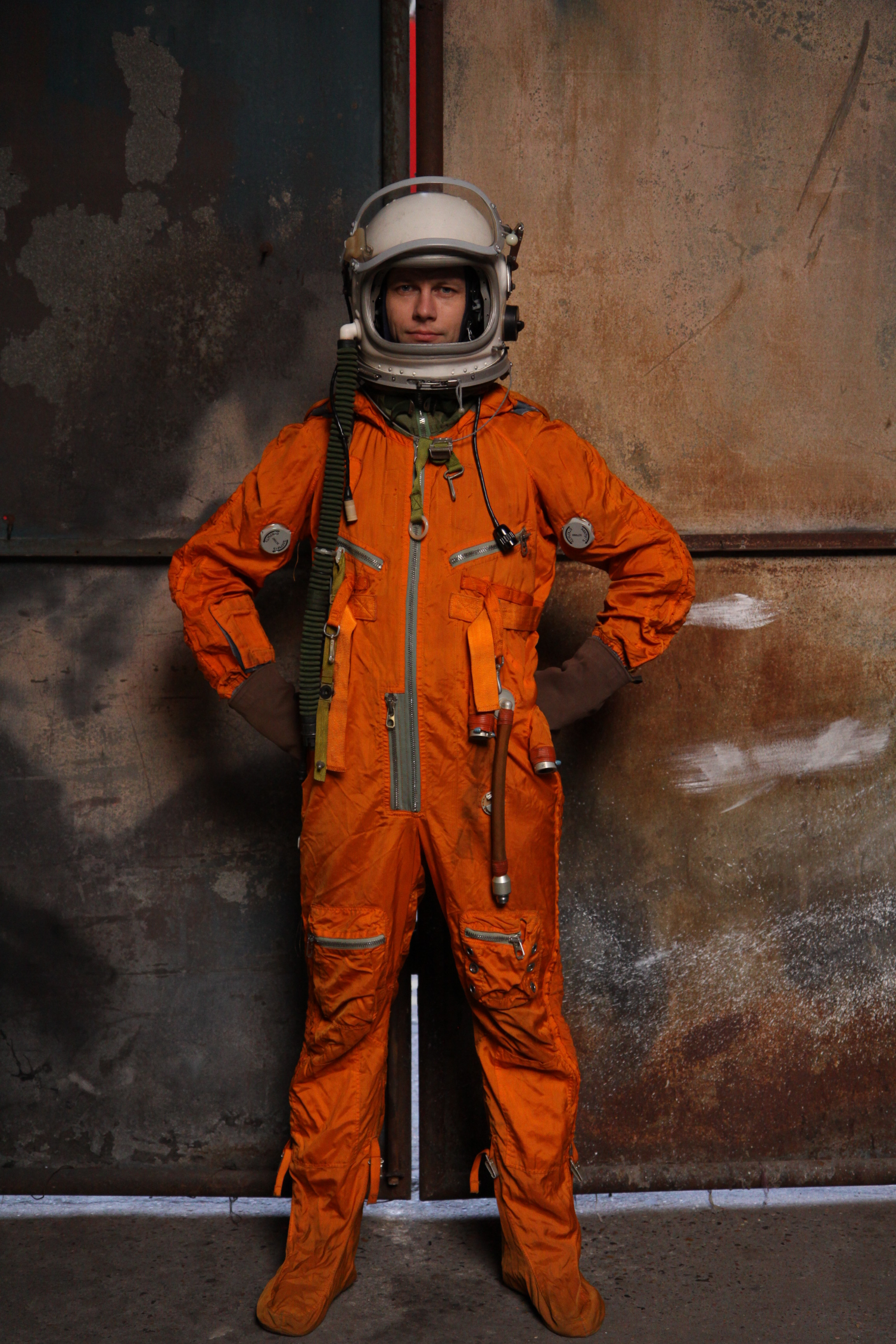
- Ockenden in The Cosmonaut (2013)
- Born: 16 August 1978 (age 47); Looe, Cornwall, England
- Occupation: Actor
- Years active: 2003–present
- Spouse: Vanessa Hehir (m. 2010)
- Children: 1

Leon Ockenden (born 16 August 1978) is an English actor, director and writer who works in TV, film, theatre and radio. He grew up in the resort town of Looe, Cornwall. He is best known for his role as Norman Jayden in Heavy Rain.

== Career ==
Ockenden left school at the age of 16 to become a baker. After working in hotel kitchens in Sweden and Germany for one year, he returned to Britain to work as a pastry chef at the Hilton Hotel on London's Park Lane. He studied performing arts at the College of Further Education in Plymouth. He then received a scholarship from the London Academy of Music and Dramatic Art, where he took a three-year acting course and graduated in 2003.

Ockenden appeared in the British/Australian drama television series Tripping Over, playing a carpenter named Callum. He lent his voice and likeness to the 2010 video game Heavy Rain, in which he played Federal Bureau of Investigation profiler Norman Jayden. Before the show was cancelled in 2015, he was a regular of the British drama television series Waterloo Road, in which he played the role of Hector Reid, a jocular and sometimes vitriolic teacher of PE. After Waterloo Road, Ockenden has had other roles as a recurring cast member. One of these roles includes the character of Will Chatterton in the long-running soap opera Coronation Street. He has also joined the presenting team on the chat show This Morning as one of its regular chefs for its cooking segment.

He also appeared in a television advert for Verisure in 2021.

== Personal life ==
Ockenden married actress Vanessa Hehir on 24 October 2010. They have a daughter. Ockenden is a fan of Liverpool.

== Filmography ==
Key
†	Denotes works that have not yet been released

=== Films ===
Year	Title	Role	Notes
2005	Vegabond Shoes	Champagne waiter	Short film
2009	Mr. Right	Lawrence	
2009	Dread	Jimmy Cake	
2011	Baroque	Lover/fighter	Short film
2011	The Field of Vision	Cpt. Joe Temski	Short film
2012	Red Tails	Co-pilot	
2013	The Cosmonaut	Stas	
2013	Don't Miss the Cup	Peter	Short film
2015	Eliana	Dude	Short film
2016	Across the River	Cake shop owner	
2020	The Reckoning	Morton Tobias	
2021	R.I.A.	Robert	
2021	The Willows	Peter	Short film
2022	The Bulls	Leon	Short film
2022	The Lair	Oswald Jones	
2024	The RedRoom	Hugo	Short film
TBA	†Lioness	Viscount Davenport	Pre-production

=== Television ===
Year	Title	Role	Notes
2003	Judge John Deed	Nick	Episode: "Economic Imperative"
2003	The Private Life of Samuel Pepys	Pembleton	Television film
2004	Midsomer Murders	Jamie Cruickshank	Episode: "The Maid in Splendour"
2004	Hawking	Rosencrantz	Television film
2004	Hustle	Simon	Episode: "A Touch of Class"
2004	Family Affairs	Sam Taylor	Series regular (May–December)
2005	Totally Frank	Miles	Episode: "Bed"
2006	Tripping Over	Callum	6 episodes
2007–2008	Heartbeat	Dr Chris Oakley	10 episodes
2008	Heroes and Villains	Earl of Leicester	Episode: "Richard the Lionheart"
2009	Casualty	Luke Riley	Episode: "Every Breath You Take"
2010	Secret Diary of a Call Girl	Connor	Episode No. 3.7
2010	Identity	DI Terry Eggleston	Episode: "Chelsea Girl"
2010	An Old Fashioned Christmas	Cameron	Television film
2010	New Tricks	Kevin Humphreys	Episode: "Good Morning Lemmings"
2011	The Runaway	Bruce	Episode No. 1.4
2012	Best Possible Taste: The Kenny Everett Story	Philip	Television film
2012	Secrets of the Dead	Vasily Arkhipov	Episode: "The Man Who Saved the World"
2013	Casualty	Adam Ridle	Episode: "Punch Drunk Love"
2013	Open Desert	David	Television film
2013	The Cosmonaut: Transmedia Experience	Stas	Main cast (31 episodes)
2014	Waterloo Road	Hector Reid	20 episodes
2015	Mr Selfridge	Serge De Bolotoff	10 episodes
2015	Supreme Tweeter	Tweeter	Episode: "Follow the Leader"
2015	The Coroner	Danny Ball	Episode: "That's the Way to Do It"
2016	This Morning	Guest Chef	10 Episodes, stood in for Phil Vickery
2016–2017	Coronation Street	Will Chatterton	Recurring role; 40 episodes
2022	Father Brown	Richard Belcroft	Episode: "The Viper's Tongue"
2022	Why Didn't They Ask Evans?	Alex Pritchard	Miniseries; 2 episodes
2022	Whitstable Pearl	Scott	Episode: "The Gumshoe and the Femme Fatale"
2023	Ancient Empires	Philip II	Episode: "Alexander The Great"
2024	Senna	James Hunt	

=== Video games ===
Year	Title	Role
2010	Heavy Rain	Norman Jayden

=== Music videos ===
Year	Title	Artist	Role
2005	"Desire"	Geri Halliwell	Boss

== Theatre ==
- How the Other Half Loves (2017)
- Flare Path (2015)
- Muswell Hill (2012)
- Plague Over England (2008)
- Women Beware Women (2006)
- The Tempest (2006)
