= Love & War (TV series) =

- Genre: Sitcom
- Created by: Diane English
- Starring: Susan Dey; Jay Thomas; John Hancock; Joanna Gleason; Joel Murray; Michael Nouri; Suzie Plakson; Charlie Robinson; Annie Potts
- Composer: Jonathan Tunick
- Country of origin: United States
- Original language: English
- No. of seasons: 3
- No. of episodes: 68 (5 unaired) (list of episodes)

Production
- Executive producer: Diane English
- Camera setup: Multi-camera
- Running time: 30 minutes
- Production company: Shukovsky English Entertainment

Original release
- Network: CBS
- Release: September 21, 1992 – August 18, 1995

Love & War is an American sitcom television series that aired on CBS from September 21, 1992, to August 18, 1995.

Created by Diane English, the series originally starred Susan Dey as Wally Porter, a New York City restaurateur, and Jay Thomas as Jack Stein, a newspaper columnist with whom she had an on-again, off-again romance.

After the first season, however, the show was retooled and Dey was fired by the producers of the show, saying that she and Thomas had "no chemistry" together. She was replaced by Annie Potts as Dana Palladino, who bought Porter's restaurant and also became a love interest for Jack.

The first season also featured moments when Jack or Wally would break the fourth wall and address the camera directly, generally using it as an opportunity to discuss an emotional crisis. This technique was dropped in later seasons.

One episode featured a guest appearance from Jerry Seinfeld and Larry David as themselves; they did this as a "thank you" to creator Diane English for allowing a brief scene on Murphy Brown in an episode of Seinfeld where Kramer is cast as the titular character's secretary.

The show's supporting cast included Suzie Plakson, Joanna Gleason, Joel Murray, Charlie Robinson and Michael Nouri. John Hancock, who had a recurring role as a judge on L.A. Law with Susan Dey previously, portrayed bartender Ike for the first half of season one, until he died of a heart attack in late 1992. His death was subsequently written into the series and he was replaced by actor Charlie Robinson playing Ike's brother Abe.

== Cast ==
- Jay Thomas as Jack Stein
- Susan Dey as Wally Porter (1992–93)
- John Hancock as Ike Johnson (1992)
- Joel Murray as Ray Litvak
- Michael Nouri as Kip Zakaris
- Suzie Plakson as Meg Tynan
- Joanna Gleason as Nadine Berkus
- Charlie Robinson as Abe Johnson
- Annie Potts as Dana Palladino (1993–95)

== Episodes ==
Season	Episodes	Originally released		Rank	Rating
Season	Episodes	First released	Last released	Rank	Rating
1	24	September 21, 1992	May 10, 1993	15	14.7
2	22	September 20, 1993	May 9, 1994	13	14.5
3	22	September 19, 1994	August 18, 1995	47	10.9

== Scheduling ==
In its first two and a half seasons, the show aired on Monday nights following another Diane English production, Murphy Brown. Midway through its third season, it was moved to Wednesday nights where ratings sagged, leading to its cancellation, along with half of CBS's prime-time lineup.

== Awards and nominations ==
Potts was nominated for an Emmy Award for Outstanding Lead Actress - Comedy Series in 1994, but lost to Candice Bergen. Guest stars Tracey Ullman and Eileen Heckart won Emmys for Outstanding Guest Actress in a Comedy Series in 1993 and 1994, respectively, while Sid Caesar was nominated for Outstanding Guest Actor in a Comedy Series in 1995, but did not win.

The show was also a nominee for Outstanding Main Title Theme Music in 1993.
