= List of Love & War episodes =

The following is a list of episodes for the television sitcom Love & War. The series premiered on September 21, 1992 on CBS.

== Series overview ==
Season	Episodes	Originally released		Rank	Rating
Season	Episodes	First released	Last released	Rank	Rating
1	24	September 21, 1992	May 10, 1993	15	14.7
2	22	September 20, 1993	May 9, 1994	13	14.5
3	22	September 19, 1994	August 18, 1995	47	10.9

== Episodes ==
=== Season 1 (1992–93) ===
No. overall	No. in season	Title	Directed by	Written by	Original release date	Viewers (millions)
1	1	"Pilot" "Love Is Hell"	Jay Sandrich	Diane English	September 21, 1992	23.5
2	2	"Pilot" "Love Is Hell"	Jay Sandrich	Diane English	September 21, 1992	23.5
Having lost her restaurant in a divorce settlement, Wally Porter decides to buy an old Manhattan bar where she meets columnist Jack Stein. Though they are complete opposites they find each other interesting, even though she is preparing to ruin his favorite hangout.
3	3	"Step 2"	Lee Shallat	Diane English	September 28, 1992	24.2
Jack becomes acquainted with Kip, Wally's impressive ex-husband. Jack impulsively invites Wally to a home-cooked dinner and Wally impulsively invites him to be intimate with her.
4	4	"Check, Please"	Lee Shallat	Shannon Gaughan	October 5, 1992	21.5
Jack and Wally have their first date at a new high-class restaurant and it does not go well, particularly when it comes time to pay the check. Meanwhile, Nadine tries to remake the Blue Shamrock's customers.
5	5	"Waiting For Henry"	Lee Shallat	Stephen Nathan	October 12, 1992	21.5
Jack is too tied up with work to attend the newly refurbished Shamrock's grand re-opening, which proves disastrous enough for Wally to accept comfort from her ex-husband.
6	6	"What Are You Wearing?"	Lee Shallat	Elaine Pope	October 19, 1992	22.1
A press club dinner presenting Jack with a coveted award inspires crossed signals when Jack and Wally ask each other to dress to each other's ideals---a suit for Jack, a revealing dress for Wally.
7	7	"Voyage of the Damned"	Lee Shallat	Marc Flanagan	October 26, 1992	18.5
Jack takes Wally on a weekend getaway to see the fall colors, but his obviously inadequate planning starts to drive her crazy.
8	8	"Bustiers and Body Points"	Lee Shallat	Matt Goldman	November 2, 1992	17.2
When their friends point out that they have been together for two months now, Jack and Wally drive themselves crazy trying to find the perfect gifts for each other.
9	9	"Monday, Monday"	Lee Shallat	Matt Goldman	November 9, 1992	21.3
Deciding that they have been spending too much time together, Wally and Jack decide to devote Mondays to their own activities, but both are disappointed – Jack with Ike's secret poker game, and Wally with her evening at an art gallery opening.
10	10	"For John"	Lee Shallat	Diane English	November 16, 1992	19.2
The sudden death of Ike the bartender is startling, and the revelations that occur at his memorial in the bar are more so – as are Jack's emotions.
11	11	"The Doppler Effect"	Lee Shallat	Marc Flanagan	November 30, 1992	19.8
Wally's oldest friendship is tested when the woman and her new husband invite her and Jack to join them for dinner – and prove to be insufferable snobs.
12	12	"Not Tonight, Honey"	Lee Shallat	Stephen Nathan	December 7, 1992	18.8
Wally and Jack think they need to rekindle their sex life with a wild night, while Ike's brother Abe turns up at the Blue Shamrock, having inherited a piece of the bar.
13	13	"A Christmas Kvell"	Peter Bonerz	Elaine Pope	December 14, 1992	22.0
When she finds that Jack wants to celebrate Hanukkah rather than Christmas, Wally tries to change his mind.
14	14	"The Prima Dava"	Peter Bonerz	Marc Flanagan	January 4, 1993	22.5
Wally and Jack find Jack's old flame (guest star Tracey Ullman) sleeping in his bed, and unwilling to leave without a fight this time.
15	15	"PMS, I Love You"	Peter Bonerz	Shannon Gaughan	January 11, 1993	24.2
A restaurant critic in a bad mood pays the Blue Shamrock a visit, prompting Wally in her own bad mood to think about bribing him.
16	16	"Whitewashed"	Peter Bonerz	Matt Goldman	January 18, 1993	23.3
Wally struggles to persuade the slovenly Jack to clean up his apartment.
17	17	"Two On the Aisle"	Peter Bonerz	Stephen Nathan	February 1, 1993	23.0
Jack persuades Wally to see a movie with him, but the feminist film they see is not what he had in mind.
18	18	"Tattoo You"	Peter Bonerz	Shannon Gaughan	February 8, 1993	20.3
Wally is angered when Jack’s traditionalist views mean that he disapproves of her new tattoo.
19	19	"Valentine's Day"	Peter Bonerz	Marc Flanagan	February 15, 1993	23.5
Jack makes plans for what he thinks will be a romantic Valentine's Day date, but there is no way he can satisfy Wally's high hopes and expectations.
20	20	"The Big Lie"	Peter Bonerz	Elaine Pope	February 22, 1993	19.7
Wally discovers that Jack has lied to her about a date with an attractive woman.
21	21	"Friends and Relations"	Peter Bonerz	Diane English	March 1, 1993	21.8
Jack is nervous about meeting Wally's parents.
22	22	"Sick About You"	Peter Bonerz	Elaine Pope & Stephen Nathan	March 15, 1993	21.6
Wally plans a special evening with Jack, but he is burning up with a temperature instead of passion.
23	23	"Opening Day"	Peter Bonerz	Matt Goldman	May 3, 1993	18.5
Wally lacks team spirit when she joins Jack and Meg for their traditional opening day at the ballpark.
24	24	"Croton-On-Hudson"	Peter Bonerz	Marc Flanagan	May 10, 1993	16.2
After her daughter elopes, Nadine plans a wedding after the fact with Wally as the caterer.

=== Season 2 (1993–94) ===
No. overall	No. in season	Title	Directed by	Written by	Original release date	Viewers (millions)
25	1	"Just in Time"	Michael Lembeck	Diane English	September 20, 1993	20.9
Jack is devastated when he receives a letter from Wally explaining that she has left him, the bar, and the country. Dana Palladino enters the scene as the new spitfire chef at the Blue Shamrock.
26	2	"All I Really Need Is the Girl"	Michael Lembeck	Elaine Pope	September 27, 1993	22.5
With Jack still heartbroken over Wally, the gang holds a get-together hoping to put Jack and Dana together. But it is far too soon for Jack.
27	3	"I Only Have Eyes for You"	Michael Lembeck	Shannon Gaughan	October 4, 1993	22.3
Jack thinks a woman is flirting with him, so he makes a bet with Dana that he can get the woman's phone number before she leaves.
28	4	"But Not for Me"	Michael Lembeck	Marc Flanagan	October 11, 1993	20.1
After Kip is nominated for a daytime television award, he invites the gang to the ceremonies and asks Dana to be his date. Monty Hall makes a guest appearance as himself.
29	5	"It Don't Mean a Thing If It Ain't Got That Swing"	Michael Lembeck	Matt Goldman	October 18, 1993	18.7
Jack takes a few punches after a couple of macho patrons hit on Dana, and an old-fashioned barroom brawl breaks out at the Blue Shamrock.
30	6	"Nice Work If You Can Get It"	Michael Lembeck	Stephen Nathan	October 25, 1993	19.6
Dana's dinner invitation to Jack is not just a kind gesture as she has a secret agenda—she needs help moving furniture.
31	7	"Stormy Weather"	Michael Lembeck	Steve Skrovan	November 1, 1993	18.1
Dana's best friend comes to town and warms up to Jack. When she feels a "spark" for another guy, she drop Jack cold and asks Dana handle the mess.
32	8	"They Can't Take That Away from Me"	Michael Lembeck	Matt Goldman	November 8, 1993	17.2
Much to his displeasure, Jack is temporarily assigned to his newspaper's style beat and covers the closing of a department store.
33	9	"I Got Plenty of Nothing"	Michael Lembeck	Elaine Pope	November 15, 1993	21.0
When Jack sees a doctor about a private problem, his agitation at having a female physician is worsened when he bumps into Dana in the reception area.
34	10	"I Love a Parade"	Michael Lembeck	Marc Flanagan	November 22, 1993	18.0
While attending the Macy’s Thanksgiving Day parade, the gang ends up doing some unexpected babysitting when a woman leaves her boy with Jack.
35	11	"Let's Not Call It Love"	Michael Lembeck	Shannon Gaughan	December 6, 1993	18.9
Jack and Dana go out as friends, and everywhere they go, they are mistaken for a romantic couple making it harder for them to keep things platonic.
36	12	"Something's Gotta Give"	Michael Lembeck	Robert Rabinowitz	December 13, 1993	19.2
Jack and Dana discover that their feelings for each other have reached a new level when they get stuck in an elevator at the Empire State Building.
37	13	"Slaughter On Tenth Avenue"	Michael Lembeck	Elaine Pope	January 3, 1994	20.8
Dana takes Jack shopping to convince him that salespeople discriminate against women.
38	14	"It Ain't Necessarily So"	Michael Lembeck	Lisa A. Bannick	January 10, 1994	20.7
Meg introduces her new beau to the Blue Shamrock gang, who are all astonished by his resemblance to Jack.
39	15	"I Got A Crush on You"	Robert Berlinger	Shannon Gaughan	January 17, 1994	24.0
Everyone at the Blue Shamrock thinks a college student has a crush on Jack—except Jack.
40	16	"A Fine Romance"	Michael Lembeck	Marc Flanagan & Stephen Nathan	January 24, 1994	22.1
Abe is visited by his ex-wife and before he knows it, he's ready to say "I do" again.
41	17	"Buddy, Can You Spare a Dime?"	Robert Berlinger	Matt Goldman	January 31, 1994	20.1
After lending Dana money for a down payment on a co-op, Jack discovers her spending habits may not be in his best interest.
42	18	"How High the Moon?"	Robert Berlinger	Elaine Pope	February 28, 1994	20.9
Ray is angry with Meg when she blabs about his personal life after being sworn to secrecy.
43	19	"You Make Me Feel So Young"	Robert Berlinger	Diane English	March 7, 1994	21.7
Jack's mom goes out with Dana's dad.
44	20	"Bali Ha'i"	Robert Berlinger	Marc Flanagan	March 14, 1994	18.5
Nadine entertains the prospect of a relationship with a handsome literature professor.
45	21	"Are the Stars Out Tonight?"	Robert Berlinger	Stephen Nathan	May 2, 1994	17.1
Ray is left star-crossed after a date with Dana doesn't quite go as he had wished.
46	22	"Slow Boat to China"	Robert Berlinger	Shannon Gaughan	May 9, 1994	15.5
Murphy's Law is in full effect when Jack and Dana finally go out on their first "real date."

=== Season 3 (1994–95) ===
No. overall	No. in season	Title	Directed by	Written by	Original release date	Viewers (millions)
47	1	"The Morning After the Night Before"	Robert Berlinger	Diane English	September 19, 1994	15.7
Jack and Dana's night together gives way to a day of disappointment.
48	2	"A Nation Turns Its Lonely Eyes to You"	Robert Berlinger	Shannon Gaughan	September 26, 1994	19.2
Patrons of the Blue Shamrock put their evenings on hold to watch TV coverage of an astronaut who is on the run and wanted for murder.
49	3	"The Squeaky Wheel"	Robert Berlinger	Rob Greenberg	October 3, 1994	17.7
Jack gets into trouble for using the handicapped stall at a diner.
50	4	"The Great Escape"	Robert Berlinger	Emily Levine	October 10, 1994	18.7
When Nadine hosts a birthday party for her husband in prison, Jack and Dana do some “cell mating” in the conjugal visiting room.
51	5	"A New York Yankee in Queen Dana's Court"	Robert Berlinger	Matt Goldman	October 17, 1994	18.7
Jack and Dana's differing ideas of relaxation clash during a Mediterranean vacation.
52	6	"Ten Cents a Dance"	Robert Berlinger	Janet Leahy	October 24, 1994	16.7
Jack watches from the sidelines as a long-lost love waltzes back into Dana's life during a dance marathon.
53	7	"Jack's Breast"	Charlie Robinson	Ian Praiser	November 7, 1994	17.1
A wary Jack submits to a mammogram after Dana discovers a strange lump in his chest.
54	8	"Moving in"	Robert Berlinger	Shannon Gaughan	November 14, 1994	18.2
Jack moves in with Dana and reluctantly sublets his apartment to Ray.
55	9	"The Luck of the Irish"	Robert Berlinger	Matt Goldman	November 28, 1994	18.2
Meg's relationship with a New York Knicks player becomes fodder for public discussion after his performance on the court is seemingly linked to his performance in bed.
56	10	"The Bum"	Robert Berlinger	Emily Levine	December 5, 1994	15.7
Abe is outraged when a homeless man sues the Blue Shamrock, claiming that a free meal gave him food poisoning.
57	11	"A Purse, a Date, a Plane"	Robert Berlinger	Rob Greenberg	December 12, 1994	18.5
Ray must face his own bigotry when his blind date turns out to be black.
58	12	"At the Pantheon, Part I"	Robert Berlinger	Ian Praiser	January 4, 1995	10.7
Regulars at the Blue Shamrock share their memories of a landmark movie theatre that's about to be torn down.
59	13	"At the Pantheon, Part II"	Robert Berlinger	Ian Praiser	January 11, 1995	8.4
The bar patrons share more memories of a landmark theater that's closing and Jack tells of spending an evening there with his father.
60	14	"Nadine Sings the Blues"	Robert Berlinger	Janet Leahy	January 18, 1995	10.0
The gang takes Nadine out on the town after her divorce is finalized.
61	15	"Mob Story"	Robert Berlinger	Rob Greenberg	January 25, 1995	9.0
Jack and the gang suspect that a flamboyant man and his entourage who have made the Blue Shamrock their new hangout may be gangsters.
62	16	"I Like to Be in America"	Robert Berlinger	Emily Levine	February 1, 1995	9.7
INS agents arrest an unlikely suspect when they visit the Blue Shamrock to look for illegal aliens among the employees: it seems Dana isn't a US citizen.
63	17	"One Strike, You're Out"	Robert Berlinger	Shannon Gaughan	August 18, 1995	4.6
Jack's newspaper shuts down during a strike.
64	18	"Atlantic City"	Robert Berlinger	Matt Goldman	Unaired	N/A
Bad luck is in the cards for most of the gang when Jack invites his friends to Atlantic City to celebrate his birthday.
65	19	"The Proposal"	Joanna Gleason	Story by : Ian Praiser; Teleplay by : Wil Calhoun	Unaired	N/A
Hoping to take control of his own destiny, an unemployed Jack makes plans to break up with Dana.
66	20	"Shrunken Heads"	Robert Berlinger	Stephen Nathan	Unaired	N/A
On the eve of their wedding, Jack and Dana seek help from a therapist.
67	21	"Tradition"	Robert Berlinger	Janet Leahy	Unaired	N/A
Jack's bachelor party lands him in the hospital after a buddy stresses him out by sharing the details of a horribly messy divorce.
68	22	"Something Old, Something New, Something Borrowed and a Cat"	Robert Berlinger	Diane English	Unaired	N/A
Jack has an important job interview the same day that he's supposed to marry Dana.
