= Alpha Alpha =

- Genre: Science fiction
- Created by: Wolfgang F. Henschel
- Starring: Karl Michael Vogler; Lilith Ungerer; Arthur Brauss; Horst Sachtleben
- Composer: Erich Ferstl
- Country of origin: Germany
- Original language: German
- No. of seasons: 1
- No. of episodes: 13

Production
- Running time: 25 Minutes

Original release
- Network: ZDF
- Release: May 3 – August 2, 1972

Alpha Alpha was a 1972 German science fiction fantasy television series which aired on ZDF. It starred Karl Michael Vogler, Lilith Ungerer, Arthur Brauss and Horst Sachtleben. Each episode was only 25 minutes long; the series lasted only one season. Karl Michael Vogler played agent alpha of an unnamed secret organization, investigating mysteries, technical and psychic phenomena and even alien encounters. Alpha Alpha's tenor was comparable to the later X-Files drama television series.

== Episodes ==
All episodes are written and directed by Wolfgang F. Henschel

- 1. Die Organisation - first aired 3 May 1972
- 2. Gedanken sind frei - first aired 10 May 1972
- 3. Wie die Ratten - first aired 17 May 1972
- 4. Der Astronaut - first aired 31 May 1972
- 5. Omega schweigt - first aired 7 June 1972
- 6. Der Weltfriede - first aired 14 June 1972
- 7. Abbilder - first aired 21 June 1972
- 8. Die List des Odysseus - first aired 28 June 1972
- 9. Die Nacht im Zoo - first aired 5 July 1972
- 10. Ein begabtes Kind - first aired 12 July 1972
- 11. Heute ist Damals - first aired 19 July 1972
- 12. Außer Dienst - first aired 26 July 1972
- 13. Unsterblichkeit - first aired 2 August 1972

== See also ==
- List of German television series
