= Rats Saw God =

1996 book by Rob Thomas

- First edition
- Author: Rob Thomas
- Cover artist: Chris Raschka
- Language: English
- Genre: Young adult novel
- Publisher: Simon & Schuster
- Publication date: 1996
- Publication place: United States
- Media type: Print (Hardback and paperback)
- Pages: 202
- ISBN: 0-689-80777-5
- OCLC: 34925126

Rats Saw God is a young adult novel written by Rob Thomas, published in 1996.

== Plot ==
It follows the main character Steve York, the son of an astronaut. Steve is a high school student who has had issues with marijuana and has found himself in the counselor's office. The counselor tells him that he is flunking and if he wants to graduate he must write a 100-page paper about anything. Steve is reluctant to do so, at first, but eventually relents and begins the tale about the divorce of his parents, his prickly relationship with his father, and his first real relationship with a girl nicknamed Dub. Told in parallel timelines and bouncing back and forth from his senior year to his sophomore year, through writing the book Steve eventually comes to see his father as he'd never seen him before and understands that many of the things that he thought were true were completely wrong.

== Structure ==
The story takes place over the four years Steve is in high school. The narrative is interlaced between his senior year in San Diego, California and flashbacks to his freshman to junior years in Houston, Texas. The time described in Houston is supposedly the 100-page essay written by Steve as his extra English class necessary for graduation. To set off the different parts of the story Steve's time in Houston is presented in Gill Sans sans-serif typeface while his time in San Diego is shown in Industria.

== Characters ==
- Steve York - the main character, a high school student who is brilliant, but alienated from his peers by his parents' divorce and his disastrous relationship with his father. After the divorce, Steve starts drugs and flunks school, but is given one chance to graduate by writing a one hundred page essay.
- Alan York - Steve's father, referred to by his son as "the astronaut"
- Sarah York - Steve's younger sister
- Dub - Wanda Varner, Steve's girlfriend during his sophomore year of high school
- Doug - Steve's best friend in high school
- Jeff DeMouy - Steve's senior year guidance counselor
- Sky - Steve's English teacher in Houston
- Allison Kimble - Steve's girlfriend during his senior year of high school

== Title ==
The novel's title originates from a student group in the novel, the Grace Order of Dadaists also known by its abbreviated name GOD. This group used American Sign Language in their yearbook photo to spell out the phrase "Dog Was Star" which is the reverse of the phrase "Rats Saw God". Author Thomas later created the television series Veronica Mars and called a season 2 episode "Rat Saw God" after the book. Steve's sophomore-year girlfriend Wanda Varner was later used as the name of a character on the series in the episode "Return of the Kane".

In addition, a character named Alan York is referenced in the episode "Astroburger" of the TV series iZombie, also created by Thomas. In this incarnation, York is also an astronaut.

== Awards ==
The book was awarded the ALA Best Books for Young Adults in 1997.
