= List of appearances of the Moon in fiction =

The Moon has been the subject of many works of art and literature and the inspiration for numerous others. The Moon in fiction is a motif in the visual arts, the performing arts, poetry, prose, and music. Works are included in this list if they are fictional and prominently feature the Moon.

== Before the telescope was invented (–1608) ==
- Lucian's Icaromenippus and True History, written in the 2nd century AD, deal with imaginary voyages to the Moon such as on a fountain after going past the Pillars of Hercules. The theme did not become popular until the 17th century.

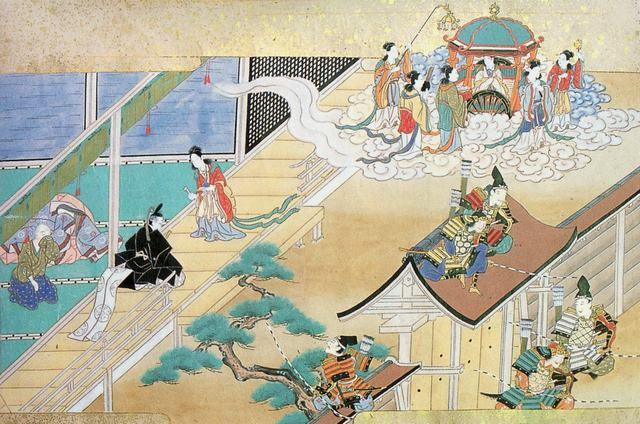
The Moon Princess returning to the Moon in The Tale of the Bamboo Cutter

- "The Tale of the Bamboo Cutter", a 10th-century Japanese folktale, tells of a mysterious Moon Princess growing up on Earth as the adopted daughter of a bamboo cutter and his wife, dazzling human Princes and the Emperor himself with her beauty, and finally returning to the Moon. It is among the first texts of any culture assuming the Moon to be an inhabited world and describing travel between it and the Earth.
- One of the earliest fictional flights to the Moon took place on the pages of Ludovico Ariosto's Italian epic poem Orlando Furioso (1516). The protagonist Orlando, having been thwarted in love, goes mad with despair and rampages through Europe and Africa, destroying everything in his path. The English knight Astolfo, seeking to find a cure for Orlando's madness, flies up to the Moon in Elijah's flaming chariot. In this depiction, the Moon is where everything lost on Earth is to be found, including Orlando's wits, and Astolfo brings them back in a bottle and makes Orlando sniff them, restoring his sanity.
- A fairy tale titled "The Buried Moon" features the Moon walking on Earth in an anthropomorphic form. After getting stuck in a bog, it is imprisoned by evil creatures. The Moon is then rescued by humans with the aid of an old wise woman.

== From the first telescope to Apollo 11 (1608–1969) ==
The invention of the telescope hastened the popular acceptance of the concept of "a world in the Moon", that the Moon was an inhabitable planet which might be reached via some sort of aerial carriage.

=== Fantasy ===
==== Literature ====
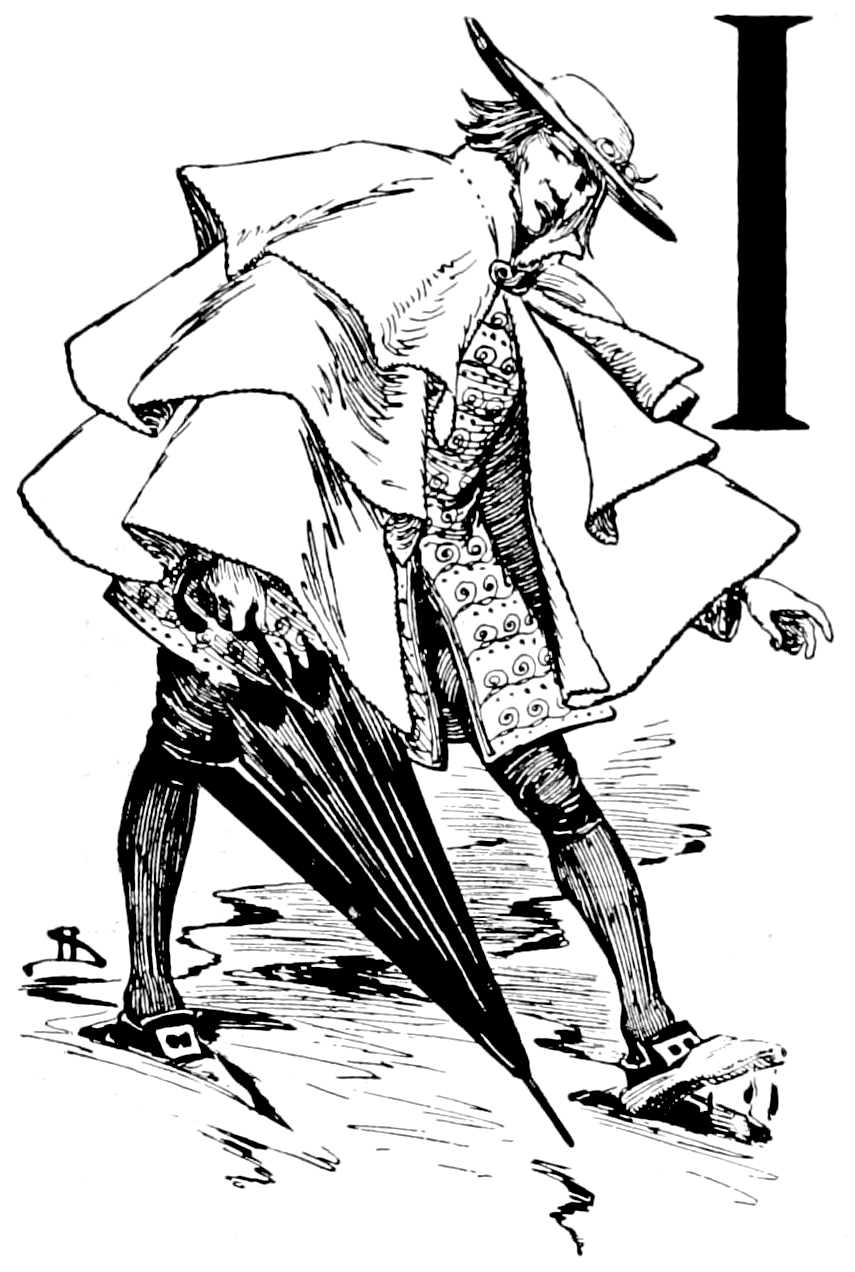
Hans Christian Andersen's 1838 "The Galoshes of Fortune": the magic shoes take a watchman to the Moon, which he finds terrible. Illustration by Helen Stratton

- Pan Twardowski, a sorcerer who made a deal with the Devil in Polish folklore and literature, is depicted as having escaped from the Devil who was taking him to Hell and ending up living on the Moon, his only companion being a spider; from time to time Twardowski lets the spider descend to Earth on a thread and bring him news from the world below.
- "The Man in the Moon" is a nursery rhyme first recorded in Joseph Ritson's collection Gammer Gurton's Garland (1784). In a few lines it relates the man in the Moon's adventures after he "came down too soon" or "came tumbling down".
- "The Galoshes of Fortune" (1838) by Hans Christian Andersen. A watchman unknowingly fits on a pair of magic galoshes that can grant people's wishes. As he wishes he could visit the Moon the shoes send him flying there. There he meets several Moon men who all wonder whether Earth is inhabited and decide this must be impossible. Back on Earth the lifeless body of the watchman is found and he is brought to a hospital, where they take his shoes off, breaking the spell again. He awakens and declares it to have been the most terrible night he had ever experienced.
- The Marvellous and Incredible Adventures of Charles Thunderbolt, in the Moon (1851) by Charles Rumball, features a steam-powered spaceship which allows the protagonist to travel to the Moon and Jupiter.
- The Princess of the Moon: A Confederate Fairy Story (1869) by "A Lady of Warrenton, Va" (Cora Semmes Ives) has the "Fairy of the Moon" descend to Earth to save a Confederate soldier from his grief after the U.S. Civil War. She gifts him with a Pegasus steed that can fly him anywhere. After surveying the South and the Union, he flies to the Moon, meets the king of the Moon and his people, falls in love with the princess, and helps their kingdom fight off an invasion of Union soldiers arriving in balloons.
- Johnny Gruelle's 1922 children's book, The Magical Land of Noom, relates the adventures of two Earth children among the inhabitants of the far side of the Moon.
- Roverandom by J. R. R. Tolkien was written in 1925 to console his son Michael, then four years old, for the loss of a beloved toy dog. In the story, the dog has flown to the Moon and had a whole series of amusing adventures there. The story was only published posthumously. In addition, Isil and the guidesman Tilion in J. R. R. Tolkien's fictional Middle-earth cosmology are based in Tolkien's familiarity with Norse and Gaelic myths of the Moon.

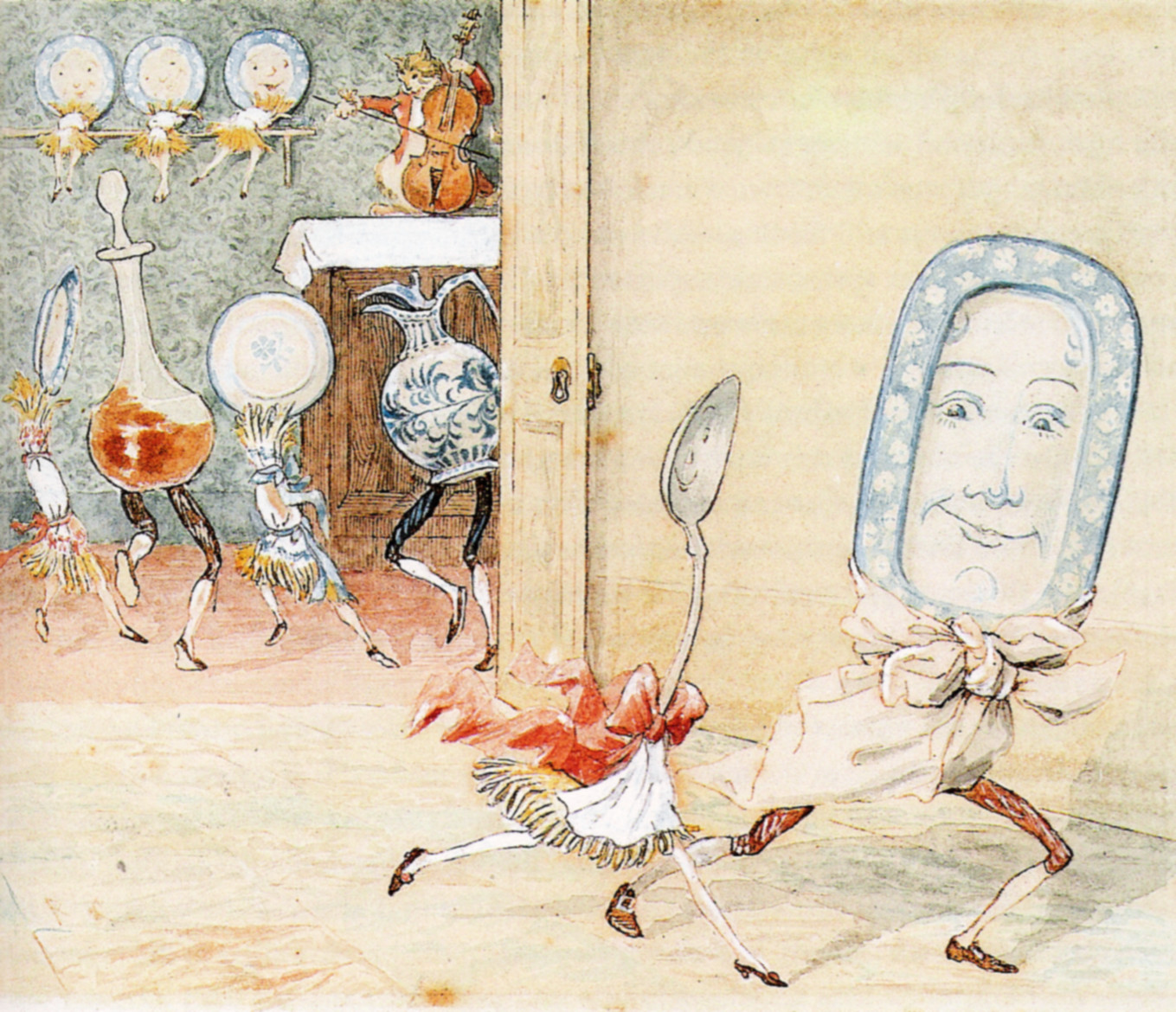
Illustration of the 16th century or older nursery rhyme "Hey Diddle Diddle, the Cat and the Fiddle ... the cow jumped over the moon" by Randolph Caldecott, 1882. It was expanded by J. R. R. Tolkien, imagining the poem that might once have preceded it.

- "The Man in the Moon Stayed Up Too Late" (1923) is J. R. R. Tolkien's imagined original song behind the nursery rhyme "Hey Diddle Diddle The Cat and the Fiddle ... the cow jumped over the moon", invented by back formation.
- In Doctor Dolittle in the Moon (1928), Doctor Dolittle travels to the Moon on the back of a giant moth and encounters intelligent plants whose language he learns (as he never did with earthly plants). He also meets the Moon's single human inhabitant, a prehistoric man who has grown into a giant due to lunar foods and conditions.
- The literary basis of the 1962 Polish fantasy film The Two Who Stole the Moon was a story of the same title, written by Kornel Makuszyński in 1928.
- Goodnight Moon (1947) by Margaret Wise Brown, illustrated by Clement Hurd.
- The Distance of the Moon, the first and probably the best-known story in the Cosmicomics collection of short stories by Italian author Italo Calvino. Calvino takes the fact that the Moon used to be much closer to the Earth and builds a story about a love triangle among people who used to jump between the Earth and the Moon, in which lovers drift apart as the Moon recedes.

==== Theater ====
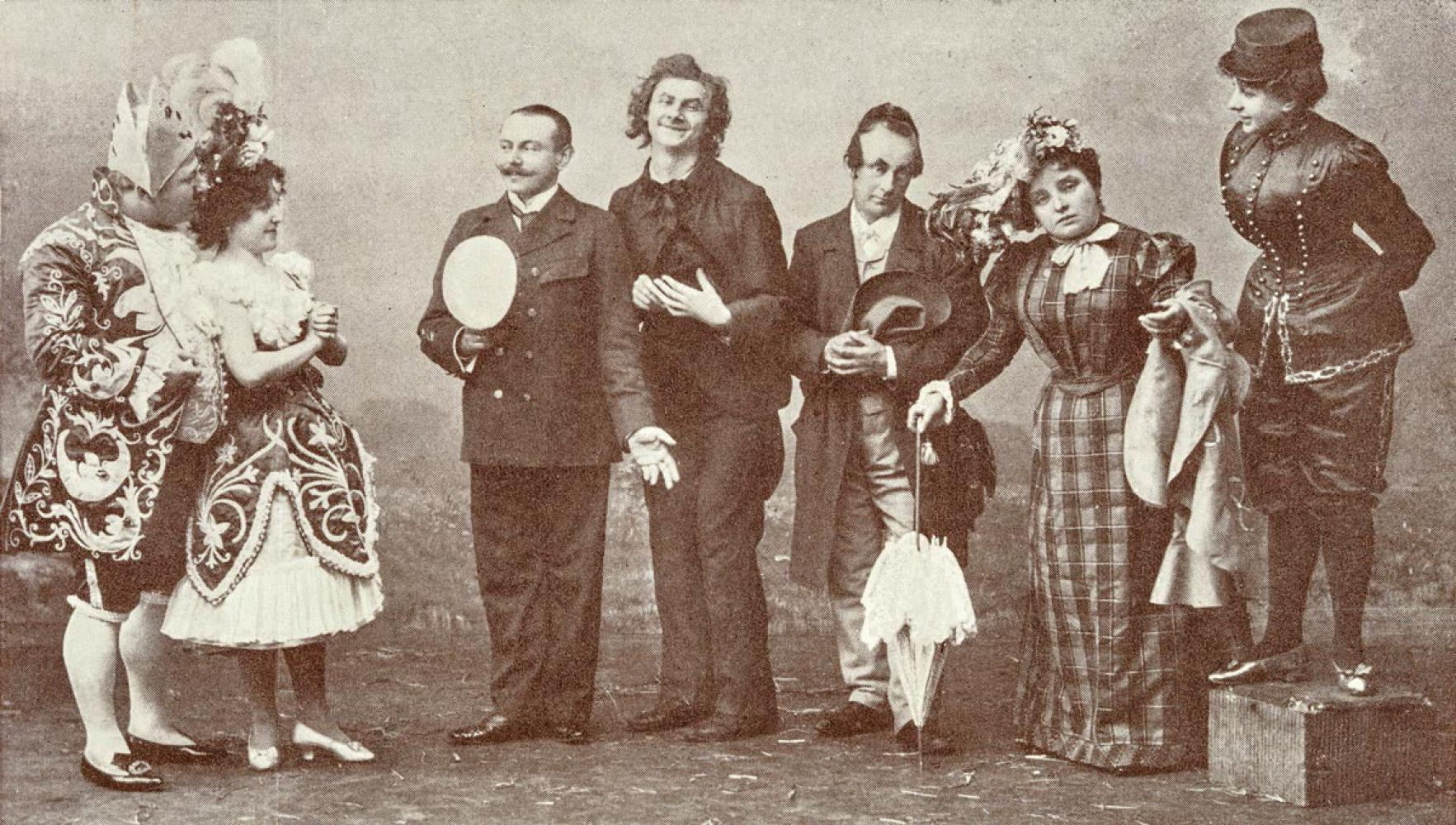
Scene from Paul Lincke's operetta Frau Luna, 1899

- Il mondo della luna (1777)
- Frau Luna, an 1899 operetta by Paul Lincke, depicts a fantastic Moon which the protagonist, amateur inventor Steppke, comes to visit.

==== Film ====
- Melody Time (1948). In the segment "Pecos Bill", Pecos Bill's fiancée Slue Foot Sue gets thrown to the Moon by Pecos' horse Widowmaker, from which she is unable to return. Bill is so depressed by the loss of his love that he howls at the Moon, and coyotes join in out of sympathy. This is a tall tale of why coyotes howl at the Moon.
- The Two Who Stole the Moon (1962) has twin brothers capture the Moon in a fishing net as the Moon sets down.

=== Science fiction ===
==== Literature ====
===== Early stories =====
17th century

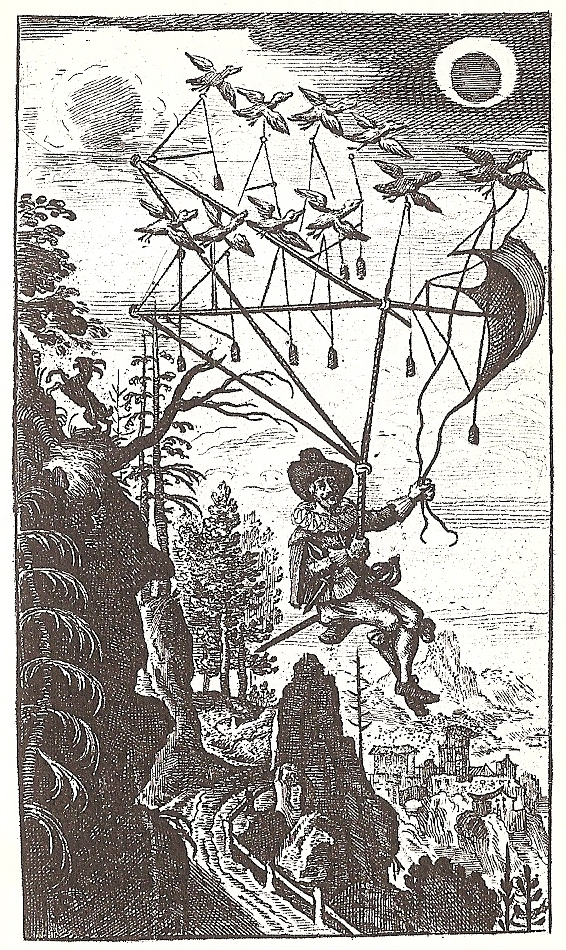
A flight to the Moon: The Man in the Moone, 1639. Illustration in 1659 German edition.

- Vejamen de la Luna (A Satirical Tract on the Moon) by Anastasio Pantaleón de Ribera (written in 1626 and published posthumously in 1634). The writer falls asleep and is transported to Selenopolis, the Imperial Court of the Moon. This lunar city is a disguised Madrid, where poets are satirized as lunatics. The work, although apparently following the traditional Ptolemaic vision of the cosmos, responds to the new cosmology as presented by Galileo Galilei and Johannes Kepler.
- The Dream (Somnium) (1634) by Johannes Kepler (written before 1610, but not published during Kepler's life). An Icelandic voyager is transported to the Moon by aerial demons; an occasion for Kepler to offer some of his astronomical theories in the guise of fiction.
- The Man in the Moone (1638) by Francis Godwin. A Spaniard flies to the Moon using a contraption pulled by geese. The lunar journey is according to the scholar Sarah Hutton a key element of "the utopian aspect of the narrative, as the vital link between earthly and lunar societies".
- The Discovery of a World in the Moone, or a discourse tending to prove that 'tis probable there may be another habitable world in that planet. (1638) by John Wilkins.
- Voyage dans la Lune (1657) by Cyrano de Bergerac, inspired by Godwin. Cyrano is launched toward the Moon by fireworks.

18th century

- The Consolidator (1705) by Daniel Defoe. Travels between China and the Moon on an engine called The Consolidator (a satire on the Parliament of England).
- A Voyage to Cacklogallinia (1727) by Samuel Brunt
- Acajou et Zirphile (1744) by Charles Pinot Duclos. In this satirical fairy tale, the prince Acajou travels to the Moon to retrieve the severed head of the princess Zirphile and restore it to her body.
- Syzygies and Lunar Quadratures Aligned to the Meridian of Mérida of the Yucatán by an Anctitone or Inhabitant of the Moon (1775), by Franciscan friar Manuel Antonio de Rivas
- Newest Voyage (1784) by Vasily Levshin. A protagonist flies in a self-constructed winged apparatus.
- The improbable adventures of Baron Munchausen (1786) included two voyages to the Moon, and a description of its flora and fauna.
- A Voyage to the Moon (1793) by Aratus (the penname of an anonymous British author, not the original Greek scientist)

19th century

- The Conquest by the Moon (1809) by Washington Irving. An invasion story meant as an allegory about treatment of Native Americans by European settlers in America.
- Land of Acephals (1824) by Wilhelm Küchelbecker. Flight in a balloon.
- A Voyage to the Moon (1827) by George Tucker.
- "The Unparalleled Adventure of One Hans Pfaall" (1835) by Edgar Allan Poe features a repairer of bellows in Rotterdam who creates a giant balloon and an 'air compressor' to allow him to travel to the Moon.

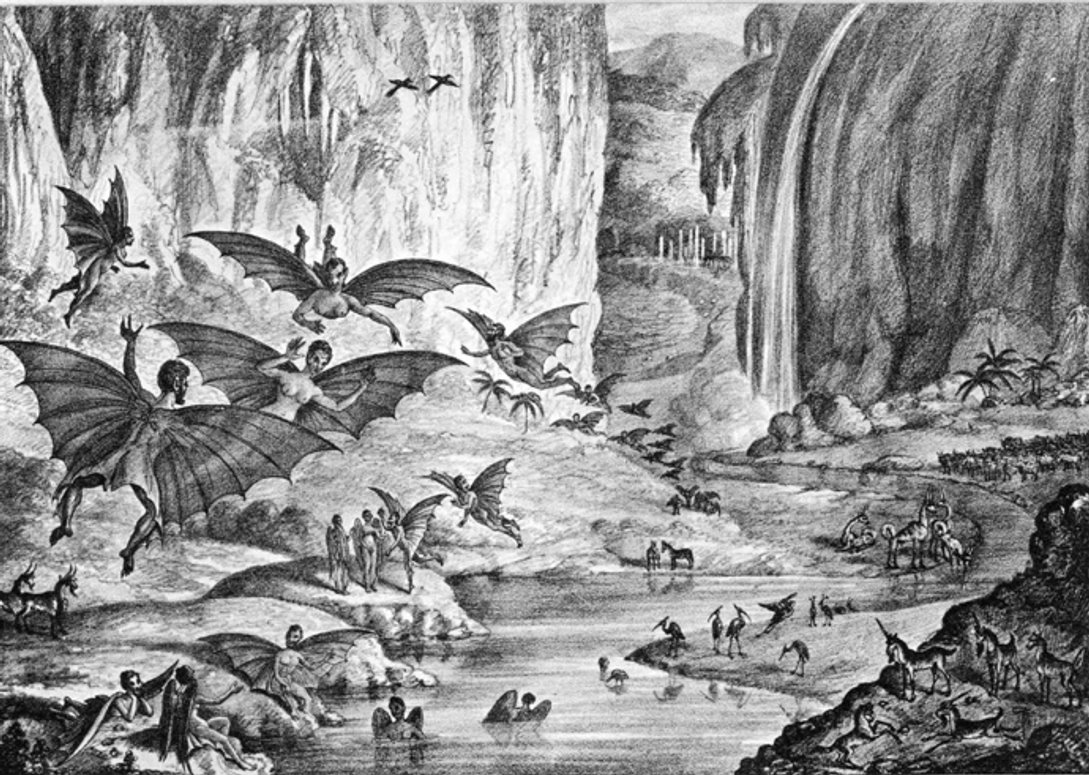
Lithograph depicting fictional lunar life, from the Great Moon Hoax of 1835

- In the Great Moon Hoax of 1835, a newspaper reporter concocted a series of stories purporting to describe the discovery of life on the Moon, talking of such creatures as winged humanoids and goats.

20th century

- The Hopkins Manuscript (1939) is a social-political dystopian novel written by R. C. Sherriff. It describes how the nations of the world, bent on destroying each other, band together to meet a common disaster—the imminent threat of the Moon itself landing on Earth.

===== First voyage =====
The first flight to the Moon was a popular topic of science fiction before the actual landing in 1969.

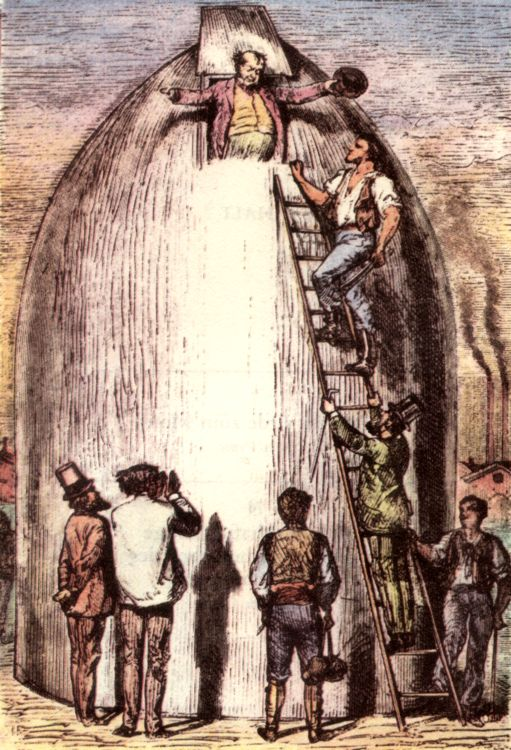
The space vessel in Jules Verne's 1865 From the Earth to the Moon

- From the Earth to the Moon (1865) and its sequel Around the Moon (1870) by Jules Verne, in which a projectile is launched from Florida and lands in the Pacific Ocean, not unlike in the Apollo program lunar orbit rendezvous.
- In Les Exilés de la Terre (Exiled from Earth, 1887), by Paschal Grousset (writing as André Laurie), a Sudanese mountain composed of pure iron ore is converted into a huge electro-magnet and catapulted to the Moon where the protagonists have various adventures.
- The First Men in the Moon (1901) by H. G. Wells in which a spaceship gets to the Moon with the aid of Cavorite; a material which shields out gravity. It is inhabited by insect-like Selenites who are ruled by a Grand Lunar, and who prevent Cavor from returning to Earth after learning of humanity's warlike nature.
- Na srebrnym globie [The Silver Globe] (1903), by Polish writer Jerzy Żuławski in which a first expedition from Earth gives birth to a lunar society. The story was continued in Zwycięzca [The Conqueror] (1910) and Stara Ziemia [The Old Earth] (1911). This so-called Lunar Trilogy was the first modern Polish SF story. It was adapted to the screen as On the Silver Globe by Andrzej Żuławski.
- "Trends" is a 1939 short story by Isaac Asimov in which religious fanatics oppose a fictional first flight to the Moon in the 1970s.
- Prelude to Space is a 1951 novel by Arthur C. Clarke recounting the events leading up to a fictional first flight to the Moon in 1978.
- Leonard Wibberley's 1962 novel The Mouse on the Moon and 1963 film is about the British, American's and Russian's wanting to get to the moon first, although the characters get worried thinking the moon will be to soft to land on.

===== Colonization =====
Bohun Lynch's 1925 Menace from the Moon

Human settlements on the Moon are found in many science fiction novels, short stories and films. Not all have the Moon colony itself as central to the plot.

- Menace from the Moon (1925), by English writer Bohun Lynch. A lunar colony, founded in 1654 by a Dutchman, an Englishman, an Italian, and "their women", threatens Earth with heat-ray doom unless it helps them escape their dying world.
- Earthlight (1955) by Arthur C. Clarke. A settlement on the Moon becomes caught in the crossfire of a war between Earth and a federation of Mars and Venus.
- A Fall of Moondust (1961) by Arthur C. Clarke. A lunar dust boat full of tourists sinks into a sea of Moon dust.

===== Inhabited Moon =====
The Moon is sometimes imagined as having, now or in the distant past, indigenous life and civilization.

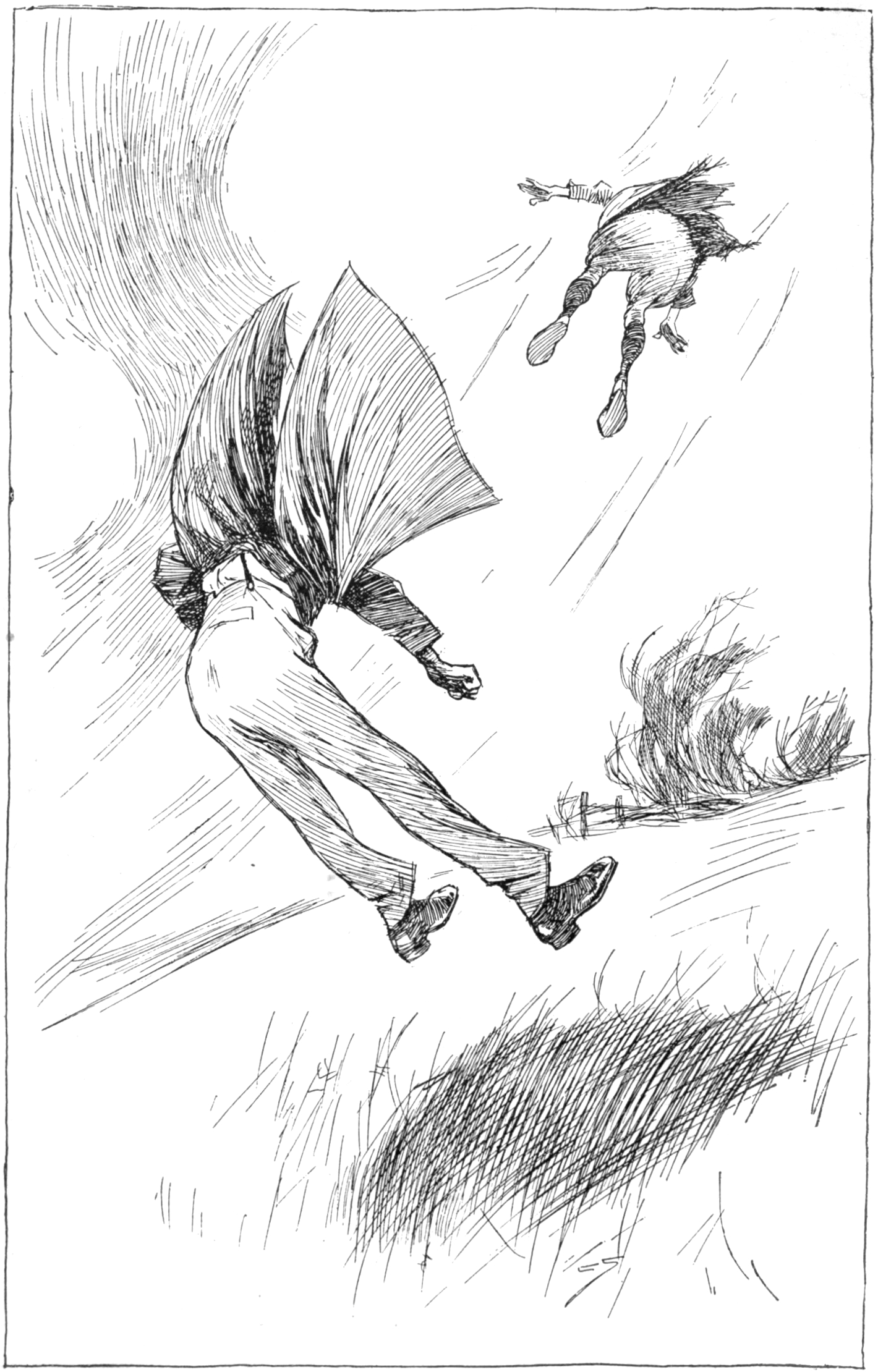
In The First Men in the Moon (1901), H. G. Wells imagines gravitational shielding.

The narrator is a London businessman named Bedford who withdraws to the countryside to write a play, by which he hopes to alleviate his financial problems. Bedford rents a small countryside house in Lympne, in Kent, where he wants to work in peace. He is bothered every afternoon, however, at precisely the same time, by a passer-by making odd noises. After two weeks Bedford accosts the man, who proves to be a reclusive physicist named Mr. Cavor. Bedford befriends Cavor when he learns he is developing a new material, cavorite, which can negate the force of gravity.

- The First Men in the Moon (1901) by H. G. Wells, the Moon is inhabited by insectoid "Selenites". Jules Verne objected to the story as Wells had relied on an invented anti-gravity mechanism rather than a plausible technology.
- Lost Paradise (1936) by C. L. Moore. This Northwest Smith story tells how the once-fertile Moon became an airless wasteland.
- In C. S. Lewis's That Hideous Strength (1945), written in response to Wells' book, the Moon (Sulva) is described as being home to a race of extreme eugenicists. On the near side, the elite caste seems to have dispensed with organic existence altogether, by some means never clearly described; the only holdouts against this trend are an embattled minority on the far side. The response of the characters to this state of affairs varies according to their status: Professor Filostrato, of the wicked N.I.C.E., considers the Sulvans "[a] great race, further advanced than we", while the Christian champion Elwin Ransom describes them as "an accursed people, full of pride and lust."
- In Badger's Moon (1949) by Elleston Trevor, four animals travel to the Moon by rocket ship and meet the inhabitants.
- Moon Man (1966) by Tomi Ungerer features the Man from the Moon coming to Earth, where he is imprisoned because he's different.
- The ″Lomokome″ Papers (1968) by Herman Wouk. Lt. Daniel Butler is left marooned on the Moon. A rescue ship finds a manuscript written by Lt. Butler where he tells a story of how he was held captive by people who live beneath the Moon's surface and how they conduct their lives, introducing various social and political commentaries by Wouk. For example, since wars are won by the possessor of the greatest industrial potential, the city states of the Moon have replaced war by intensive drives to produce consumer goods, the highest producer being declared the winner without needing to mobilize soldiers to kill each other.
- The Matthew Looney series of children's books by Jerome Beatty Jr. (written 1961–1978) is an amusing set of stories about an inhabited Moon whose government is intent on invading the Earth.

===== Robert A. Heinlein =====
Robert A. Heinlein wrote extensively, prolifically, and inter-connectedly about first voyages and colonization of the Moon, which he most often called Luna. Heinlein was also involved with the films Destination Moon and Project Moonbase.

- "Requiem" (1940). A lyrical story about Harriman, the man who financed the first Moon landing (see also "The Man Who Sold the Moon", below).
- Rocket Ship Galileo (1947). A physicist and several prodigy teenagers convert a sub-orbital rocket ship to reach the Moon where they are profoundly surprised and have to act quickly to deal with a malignant menace.
- "Columbus Was a Dope", as Lyle Monroe, (1947). In a bar on the Moon, a chance encounter reveals both deep and practical attitudes about space exploration.
- "The Long Watch" (aka "Rebellion on the Moon", 1948). An officer in charge of a nuclear arsenal on the Moon makes tough decisions.
- "Gentlemen, Be Seated!" (1948). A dangerous leak develops in a lunar tunnel and the men devise a unique way to deal with it until a repair can be made.
- "The Black Pits of Luna" (1948). A Boy Scout visits cities on the Moon.
- "The Man Who Sold the Moon" (1949 short story, first published in 1951). In this story, a prequel to "Requiem" (above), events revolve around a fictional first Moon landing in 1978.
- "Nothing Ever Happens on the Moon" (1949). A 21st-century Boy Scout on the Moon encounters numerous hazards and predicaments in a bid to earn Eagle Scout (Moon).
- The Rolling Stones (1952). The exceptional Stone family lives on the Moon and after extensive background and preparation of their own ship they depart to tour and live in the Solar System.
- "The Menace From Earth", 1957. A lunar teenage girl's romance is disrupted by a newcomer. Extensive descriptions, most noteworthy is the muscle-power flying in a huge sealed cavern.
- "Searchlight", (1962). A short-short piece about a rescue on the Moon.
- The Moon Is a Harsh Mistress (1966). In this Hugo Award winning novel, the Moon is a penal colony, especially for political prisoners and their descendants. They revolt for independence from Earth-based control. The novel discusses issues of sustainability, health, transportation, family organization, artificial intelligence, and political governance.
- The Cat Who Walks Through Walls (1985). About a third of the book takes place on a Free Luna that is a continuation of the Luna in The Moon is a Harsh Mistress. Free-enterprise is rampant; Luna City is called L-City. Hazel Stone from The Rolling Stones and TMiaHM appears.

==== Film ====
A Trip to the Moon, 1902, loosely based on two Jules Verne novels

- Le Voyage dans la Lune (1902) written and directed by Georges Méliès. Released in the US as A Trip to the Moon. A French silent film loosely based upon the Jules Verne novel From the Earth to the Moon and the First Men in the Moon. Includes a famous scene where the rocket hits the Man of the Moon in the eye.
- Frau im Mond ("Woman in the Moon", 1929), written and directed by Fritz Lang. Based on the novel Die Frau im Mond (1928) by Lang's then-wife and collaborator Thea von Harbou, translated in English as The Rocket to the Moon (1930). The film was released in the US as By Rocket to the Moon, and in the UK as Woman in the Moon. A silent film often considered to be one of the first "serious" science fiction films, in which the basics of rocket travel were presented to a mass audience for the first time.
- Things to Come (1936) was an early science fiction film and featured a spacecraft sending two people on the first crewed flight around the Moon launched into space by a space gun in the year 2036.
- Destination Moon (1950) was a groundbreaking science fiction film, based on a story treatment by Robert A. Heinlein and directed by George Pal.
- Project Moonbase (1953). A failed television pilot converted into a film.
- First Men in the Moon (1964) is a science fiction film loosely based on H. G. Wells' novel The First Men in the Moon.
- 2001: A Space Odyssey (1968) by Stanley Kubrick and Arthur C. Clarke. Includes a scene at a lunar administrative base in the Clavius crater.
- Planet of the Apes (1968) by Franklin J. Schaffner. Dodge observes that there is no moon in the sky, implying that the Moon was destroyed during the wars that turned the Earth into the Planet of the Apes.

==== Television ====
- Men into Space (1959–1960) is a science-fiction television series produced by Ziv Television Programs, Inc. and broadcast on CBS. The series depicted the efforts of the U.S. Air Force to send American astronauts into space. Several episodes depicted the first lunar landing, additional flights to the Moon, building and working on Moon bases, and using the Moon as a staging area to launch a mission to Mars.
- An early episode of the long-running British television series Doctor Who features the Moon before the Apollo 11 mission:
  - The Moonbase (1967). A four-part serial set in the year 2070, where a moonbase has been established to use a gravity-control device called the Gravitron to control the weather on Earth.

==== Comics ====
- In an early Ibis the Invincible story, the Moon has members of a humanoid race composed of stone that competed with humanity over the Earth and were exiled to the Moon thousands of years ago where they are frozen. A Professor makes a rocket ship to go to the Moon with Taia, and Ibis follows them. Two of the creatures are taken on the ship, and revive on a journey back to Earth, but are killed when the spaceship crashes.
- De Avonturen van Pa Pinkelman (1945) by Godfried Bomans and drawn by Carol Voges has the characters set foot on the Moon, where they spent a long time and meet an entire society, even with his own national anthem.
- In Hergé's Destination Moon and Explorers on the Moon (1953–1954), Tintin and his companions make the first voyage to the Moon and Tintin becomes the first explorer on the Moon.
- In The Adventures of Nero story "De Daverende Pitteleer" (1959) by Marc Sleen, Nero and his friends accidentally land on the Moon. They meet a Moon man there too, before continuing their flight to their original destination on Earth. The Moon is depicted just like Earth, with the characters walking around without having to use a space helmet or undergoing any effect of gravity loss.
- In The Adventures of Nero story "De Paarse Futen" (1968), Nero and his friends travel at sea and pick up a pair of American astronauts who crash-landed in the ocean after their attempt to travel to the Moon once again failed. Adhemar uses a magic wand to send them to the Moon and says: "This time the Americans beat the Russians." Near the end of the story a US military official arrives to congratulate Adhemar for what he has done and awards him a medal.
- In the Marvel Universe, the Moon contains the Blue Area, which at one point served as the home of the Inhumans. It was built by the Skrull race, in events which led to their long-running war with the Kree. The powerful Watcher, Uatu, watches the Solar System from a base on the Moon. In Fantastic Four #13 (1963), the Fantastic Four make the first landing on the Moon and battle the Red Ghost.

== After Apollo 11 (1969–) ==
=== Fantasy ===
==== Literature ====
- In the first book of the Captain Underpants series by Dav Pilkey (1997), a villain named Dr. Diaper attempted to blow up the Moon using a crystal powered by the Laser-Matic 2000, a plan to destroy every major city on Earth.
- Rabbit and the Moon (1998) by Douglas Wood, how Rabbit reached the Moon.
- The Boy Who Climbed Into the Moon (2010) by David Almond, about a boy who climbs a ladder to the Moon and goes inside.

==== Theater ====
- The End of the Moon by Laurie Anderson is a 90-minute monologue created as part of Anderson's two years as NASA artist-in-residence. It premiered in a two-week run at the Brooklyn Academy of Music's Harvey Theater in March 2005.
- Far Side of the Moon by Robert Lepage, a theatre creator/performer from Québec.
- The Addams Family (musical) with lyrics by Andrew Lippa, includes the character of Fester, who is in love with the moon as revealed by a truth serum in the song “Full Disclosure.” He later plays a song to the moon on his ukulele while dancing with her (The Moon) in the song “The Moon and Me.”

==== Music ====
- "Moon," a solo track by Jin, featured on BTS' 2020 studio album Map of the Soul: 7. Jin assumes the perspective of the Moon, circling and being perpetually watchful of the Earth, which represents the group's fanbase.

==== Television ====
- H_{2}O: Just Add Water (2006–2010). The Moon influences the life of the mermaids, is able to transform humans into mermaids and vice versa.
  - Two spin-off series; Mako: Island of Secrets (2013–2016) and H_{2}O: Mermaid Adventures (2015).

=== Science fiction ===
==== Literature ====
===== Colonization =====
Human settlements on the Moon are found in many science fiction novels, short stories and films. Not all have the Moon colony itself as central to the plot.

- The Lathe of Heaven (1971) by Ursula K. Le Guin. In one of the alternate realities in the novel lunar bases are established by 2002, only to be attacked by aliens from Aldebaran (who in another reality turn out to be benign).
- The Gods Themselves (1973) by Isaac Asimov. The third section of the novel takes place in a lunar settlement in the early 22nd Century.
- Inherit the Stars (1977) by James P. Hogan is the first book of the Giants series. The Moon turns out to have previously orbited Minerva, a planet that exploded to form the asteroid belt 50,000 years ago.
- Lunar Descent by Allen Steele (1991) Set in 2024, the novel describes a base called Descartes Station.
- Ice (2002) by Shane Johnson. A fictional Apollo 19 mission takes a disastrous turn when the Apollo Lunar Module ascent engine fails to fire. The astronauts then set out on their own as far as their new heavy lunar rover will take them. Their exploration leads miraculously to an ancient—but still functioning—lunar base.
- People Came From Earth by Stephen Baxter, printed in The Year's Best Science Fiction: Seventeenth Annual Collection.
- The Juniper Tree by John Kessel tells of a free-love matriarchal society on the Moon, printed in The Year's Best Science Fiction: Eighteenth Annual Collection
- In the novels A Fall of Moondust, Earthlight, Rendezvous with Rama, and 2001: A Space Odyssey, by Arthur C. Clarke, colonies of various sizes and functions exist on the Moon—some the size of cities
- The Moonrise and Moonwar books by Ben Bova tell the story of a lunar base built by an American corporation, which eventually rebels against Earth control. The books form part of the "Grand Tour" series.
- Moonfall (1998) by Jack McDevitt features a comet heading for a collision with the Moon just as the first base is being opened. ISBN 0-06-105036-9.
- The short story "Byrd Land Six" (2010) by Alastair Reynolds includes a Moon colony centered around mining helium-3.
- In the Hyperion stories by Dan Simmons, the Moon is one of several hundred colonized celestial bodies; however, it is left almost entirely abandoned as 99% of the existing colonized planets are preferable to the Moon.
- Life as We Knew It (2006) by Susan Beth Pfeffer, a novel focusing on the effects of an asteroid colliding with the Moon and knocking its orbit closer to Earth.
- Learning the World by Ken MacLeod, a first contact novel. Humans trace their history from the Moon caves, the inference being failure of the primary.
- Luna is the capital of the Society and home of its Sovereign in Pierce Brown's Red Rising series of novels: Red Rising (2014), Golden Son (2015) and Morning Star (2016).
- Luna: New Moon (2015) by Ian McDonald, and its 2016 sequel Luna: Wolf Moon, are about several rival families which compete for helium-3 mining operations on the Moon.
- Limit (2013) by Frank Schätzing: a science-fiction thriller concerning the mining of Helium-3 and tourism activities on the Moon.
- Neal Stephenson's Seveneves (2015) opens with an unexplained event shattering the Moon. In the aftermath of the Earth's devastation by the fragments, a handful of survivors settle on the Moon's now-exposed iron core.
- Artemis, a 2017 Andy Weir novel set in a fictional but scientifically plausible lunar city. The city's economy (based on tourism) is described in considerable detail. Major resources include a nuclear power plant, an aluminum smelter and an oxygen production facility.

==== Film ====
- Moon Zero Two (1969). Billed as a 'space western', this Hammer Films production followed shortly after 2001: A Space Odyssey. In the year 2021 the Moon is in the process of being colonized, and this new frontier is attracting a diverse group of people.
- Flash Gordon (1980). Emperor Ming the Merciless plans to destroy the Earth by pushing the Moon on a collision course; at the beginning of the film he showers the Earth with lunar rocks.
- Superman II (1980) Three supervillains from the Phantom Zone (Ursa, General Zod, and Non) kill all the astronauts on a mission on the Moon before heading to Earth.
- Airplane II: The Sequel (1982) A spaceplane is launched on a voyage to a colonized settlement on the Moon, encountering many difficulties on the way.
- Nothing Lasts Forever (1984) A comedy in which the New York Port Authority takes tourists on bus trips to the Moon.
- Superman IV: The Quest for Peace (1987) Superman and Nuclear Man fight on the Moon, eventually causing a solar eclipse.
- Moontrap (1989). Astronauts find ancient woman and alien robots on the Moon.
- A Grand Day Out (1989). Wallace & Gromit are going to the moon to get cheese when they realise they have ran out of it.
- The Dark Side of the Moon (1990). It is revealed that the Bermuda Triangle opens a gateway to Hell when it aligns with another triangular zone on the far side of the Moon, allowing the Devil to haunt and kill the crews of any vessel or spaceship that goes between the two triangles.
- Star Trek: First Contact (1996). By the 24th century there were approximately 50 million people living on the Moon, and on a clear day, at least two cities and man-made Lake Armstrong were visible from Earth – as such, time-traveler William Riker, sitting in the cockpit of the first warp prototype, marvels at the sight of the "unspoiled" Moon in 2063.
- Starship Troopers (1997). In the 23rd century, the Moon has been colonized with many military bases on it, and has a huge space station orbiting it, from which starships launch on voyages.
- The Fifth Element (1997) the Moon is implied to be colonized as the protagonist receives angry calls from his mother complaining about being left there instead of being brought along to a rigged vacation he won. The ball of fire directed by the "Great Evil" is turned into a second moon that orbits the Earth; the film's novelization confirms that our current Moon was the previous attempt of the Great Evil to destroy the Earth.
- Austin Powers: The Spy Who Shagged Me (1999). Dr. Evil attempts to destroy Washington, D.C., with a giant laser from his Moon base, but Austin Powers is able to stop him.
- Nutty Professor II: The Klumps (2000). In a dream, Sherman Klump accidentally blows up the Moon while trying to prevent an asteroid hitting Earth, which it does.
- Titan A.E. (2000). When an evil alien race called the Drej destroys Earth, huge chunks of debris from Earth collide with the Moon and break it in half, destroying it.
- Space Cowboys (2000). An astronaut rides a disused Russian satellite with nuclear missiles to the Moon to prevent it from entering Earth's atmosphere.
- Millennium Actress (2001). A spaceship launches from a base on the Moon on an interstellar voyage.
- Recess: School's Out (2001). A tractor beam is used in a school in an attempt to move the Moon into a different orbit around Earth, which would end summer and cause a new ice age.
- The Adventures of Pluto Nash (2002) is set on an extensively colonized Moon in the 2080s.
- The Time Machine (2002). The Moon is accidentally destroyed by human efforts at colonization in 2037. The film is not specific as to how exactly it occurs, but the use of nuclear weapons for creating caverns is cited as a cause. The destruction causes humanity to divide into Morlocks and Eloi.
- The Hitchhiker's Guide to the Galaxy (2005). The Moon is shown being rebuilt by the Magrathian construction crew in orbit around the new Earth Mark II, implying that it was also destroyed when the Vogons destroyed the first Earth.
- WALL-E (2008) One scene seems to reference an abandoned human colonization attempt on the Moon in the early 22nd century; a holographic sign is seen next to the Apollo 11 landing site advertising a proposal for an outlet mall on the Moon.
- Impact (2009) In this TV miniseries, the Moon is hit by a meteor shower, sending it on a collision course with Earth.
- Watchmen (2009) During the title sequence of this alternate history superhero film, Doctor Manhattan is shown assisting the Apollo 11 mission, filming Neil Armstrong as he walks on the Moon.
- Mr. Nobody (2009) In the future depicted by this film, Mars is shown to be colonized and in the extended cut, a TV ad promotes a vacation on the Moon, implying that it has been colonized as well.
- Moon (2009): Film about a solitary lunar employee mining for new energy resources who experiences a personal crisis as the end of his three-year contract nears. It is the feature debut of director Duncan Jones starring Sam Rockwell.
- Transformers: Dark of the Moon (2011) The Apollo 11 mission to the Moon in 1969 turned out to be a top secret mission to examine the remains of an ancient Transformer Spacecraft containing deceased alien robots.
- Apollo 18 (2011) follows a fictional top-secret Apollo 18 mission and its discovery on the Moon.
- Iron Sky (2012) Nazis attack the Earth from a base on the dark side of the Moon while a coalition, led by president Sarah Palin attempts to defeat them.
- Men in Black 3 (2012) opens with the alien antagonist escaping from LunarMax, a maximum security prison on the Moon.
- Oblivion (2013) An alien race destroys the Moon, causing massive earthquakes and tsunamis that cause great damage to the Earth.
- Stranded (2013) Astronauts working at a lunar mining base are harassed by an aggressive alien life form.
- Independence Day: Resurgence (2016) A defense base is on the Moon.
- Beyond Skyline (2017) The film ends with an alien spaceship battle next to the Moon.
- Alita: Battle Angel (2019) The protagonist has a flashback that reminds her that she once fought in a battle on the lunar surface.
- Ad Astra (2019) In this film, the Moon has various bases and colonies for tourism, with countries competing to gain more lunar territory for their mining companies and pirates attacking those who cross the satellite's "no man's land". The protagonist is appalled by humanity making life on the Moon similar to Earth's.
- Moonfall (2022) In this film, the Moon is discovered to be an "interstellar ark" from a previous human civilization which helps to seed life on Earth.

==== Television ====
- Moonbase 3 (1973). A British science fiction television show about a lunar base; aired six episodes.
- Two Gerry Anderson's series featured moonbases:
  - UFO (1970). The SHADO Moonbase is used as the launch site for SHADO Interceptors sent to destroy invading alien spaceships. Also seen are a Dalotek Corporation outpost and a Sovatek Corporation base.
  - Space: 1999 (ITC Entertainment, 1975–1977). Featured Moonbase Alpha on a Moon that had been blasted out of its orbit by a nuclear explosion at phenomenal velocity. The opening episode indicates that the base coordinated nuclear waste disposal, spaceflight operations and training, and subsequent episodes suggest mining, surface surveys and exploration, indicating a versatile base for multiple use, overseen by an international organization on Earth, the International Lunar Finance Commission, a division of the World Space Commission.
- Star Cops (1987). The titular police force has its base of operations on the Moon.
- "Masks", a 1994 Star Trek: The Next Generation episode in which the relationship between Masaka and Korgano is described as similar to the relationship between the Sun and the Moon.
- Colonization of the Moon is mentioned several times in the Star Trek franchise.
  - Star Trek: Enterprise. The Moon has already been colonized in this series.
  - The Next Generation. The character Beverly Crusher was born in Copernicus City on the surface of the Moon.
  - Deep Space Nine mentions settlements on the Moon called Tycho City, New Berlin, and Lunaport. It is also revealed that Earth's Moon is referred to by its Latin name, Luna, probably to distinguish it from the thousands of moons throughout the universe. It is also revealed that living on the Moon is seen by many humans as something of a novelty, as Jake Sisko uses the slang term "Lunar schooner" somewhat affectionately when he meets a girl from there.
- Three Moons Over Milford (2006) was a short-lived ABC Family science fiction drama television series in which a giant asteroid collides with the Moon, fracturing it into three large pieces (hence the “three moons” of the series’ title). The pieces are now in a doomsday spiral that will, in just a few years, send them crashing to Earth and obliterating all life on the planet. Knowing that they are doomed soon to die, people cast aside all social, cultural, and moral conventions and begin to live their lives to the fullest, totally without inhibitions, in what little time they have left.
- The Umbrella Academy (2019). One of the main characters, Luther, has been sent to the Moon on a mission assigned by his adoptive father. After returning to Earth four years later due to his father's death, Luther discovers that the mission was just an excuse to be exiled. The Moon is also involved in the apocalypse that Number Five is trying to prevent.
- For All Mankind (2019) depicts an alternate history in which the Soviet Union lands a human on the Moon before the United States and the Space Race doesn't end. The US and USSR respectively build Jamestown Base and Zvezda Base near Shackleton Crater.
- The Silent Sea (2021) depicts an abandoned research station, built in attempt to find water on the Moon.
- Moonhaven (2022) is a terraformed colony of the same name, built to solve Earth's problems.

==== Comics ====
- In the DC Universe, the Moon is the location of the Justice League Watchtower until its destruction by Superboy-Prime. It is also a former home of Eclipso.
- In Judge Dredd the Moon is the site of a small colony named Luna City One.

==== Computer and video games ====
- Battlezone – Set during the 1960s with an alternative history plot, in which the space race is used to cover up the military deployment of US and USSR into space, the Moon is set a stage as the first mission in the NSDF Campaign.
- Boktai – Both the protagonist and his twin brother are half descendants of an ancient civilization that used to inhabit the Moon, the Lunar Children. Their mother and aunt belonged to those people and were the last survivors. In the third game, Django travels to the Moon to reach Mahoroba, the Lunar Children's abandoned capital, where an ancient evil was sealed and the last boss battle takes place.
- Call of Duty Black Ops – The Moon is one of the maps available through the Rezurrection map pack.
- Call of Duty: Infinite Warfare – The Terminal map remake takes place on the Moon.
- Command & Conquer: Yuri's Revenge – In one of Soviet Campaign missions, the general was assigned to establish his base there in order to destroy Yuri's Lunar Command Center to prevent the Earth from falling under his psychic mind control.
- Darius II – The Moon is inhabited by enemy forces and underground bases players must confront on the fourth level.
- Dead Moon – Aliens crash land on the Moon and use it as their headquarters for invading Earth.
- Descent – the main character (the Material Defender) has to clean the Solar System of infected PTMC mines, starting from the Moon. Consequently, the first three levels of the game take place in an outpost, a sci-lab, and a military base on the Moon.
- Destiny – The Moon had previously been inhabited during humanity's "Golden Age", long before the events of the game. The majority of the gameplay on the surface is centered around Oceanus Procellarum (known by its English translation, "Ocean of Storms"), with a pair of maps in the Crucible (PvP) set in nearby Mare Cognitum.
- Destroy All Humans! 2 – The final area of the game takes place on a Russian moonbase called "Solaris".
- Donkey Kong Country Returns – After the final boss, Donkey Kong is blasted into space; as he falls, he punches the Moon, causing to fall on a volcano.
- Duke Nukem 3D – The second episode of the game, Lunar Apocalypse, takes place on a series of space stations that lead to the Moon's surface.
- Einhänder – The protagonist, a spacecraft fighter from Moon colony Selene. is sent to the Earth during the events of the Second Moon War.
- Final Fantasy IV/II (U.S SNES version) – Both the protagonist, Cecil, and his older brother and enemy until a certain point, Golbez/Theodore, are the sons of a human women and a Lunarian, the people living on the Moon. In the last part of the game the main characters travel to the Moon to confront the final boss.
- Infinite Undiscovery – The main antagonist has enchained the Moon in order to gain its power.
- The Legend of Zelda: Majora's Mask – Link, the protagonist, must prevent the Moon from crashing to Earth within three days. The Moon carries a face that dreads its inevitable destruction.
- Mass Effect – One of the sidemissions is set on the Moon.
- Metal Black (video game) – After a massive alien invasion on Earth, the Moon is overtaken by the aliens so as to involve it in their plot and its darkside sets the scene for the second level boss fight.
- Military Madness – Moon colonization wars exist between the Union and Xenon.
- Moonbase – add-on for SimCity Classic to build a lunar colony rather than an earthbound city.
- Moonbase Commander
- Moon Patrol (Irem)
- Moon Tycoon – A colony building game, claims to be the first 3-D Sim game.
- Paper Mario: The Thousand-Year Door – Mario must journey to the Moon to recover the last Crystal Star. It's also where Princess Peach was held hostage by the X-Nauts before being taken to the Palace of Shadow.
- Persona 3 – The phases of the moon are prominently featured as a sign of progression. The final boss uses the moon to attempt to bring about the "Fall", the death of all life on Earth.
- Portal 2 – Chell, having learned that Moon rocks are very good portal conductors, fires a portal at the Moon to save herself from death.
- Rebel Moon Rising, a PC game by Fenris Wolf and GT Interactive.
- Spelunky 2 – Ana travels to the moon to look for her missing parents. The interior of the moon contains Earth-like environments, like jungles and oceans.
- Star Control 2 – features a now uninhabited moonbase.
- Star Ocean: Till the End of Time – features a moonbase.
- Sonic Adventure 2 – Doctor Eggman destroyed half the Moon with the ARK's Eclipse Cannon.
- Strikers 1945 – In the original Japanese release of the game, players are rocketed towards the enemy's real headquarters situated on the Moon's surface for the last two levels.
- Super Mario Odyssey – A family of wedding planner rabbits from the Moon's far side try to obstruct Mario as he rescues Peach from Bowser's attempt to forcibly marry her in a wedding hall which exists on the near side. The game contains many references to the Moon and has three playable areas which take place on the Moon—the Moon Kingdom, Dark Side, and Darker Side.
- Terra Diver – In the future, the Moon is one of many points of galactic resources utilised by companies on Earth and hosts a company owned outpost stationed on a nearby asteroid where the fourth boss awaits.
- Zero Escape: Virtue's Last Reward – The ending of the game reveals that the events actually take place on the Moon in the year 2074 in a Moon base.
- Wolfenstein: The New Order – The game takes place on a secret Nazi moonbase near the end of the game.
- DuckTales – The fifth and final level takes place on the Moon.

==== Animation ====
- Space Brothers is a Japanese anime based on the manga of the same name. Two young brothers see a UFO, inspiring them to become astronauts and go to the Moon. While the younger brother (Hibito) eventually becomes a JAXA astronaut, the older brother (Mutta) loses his motivation and becomes wrapped in mundane life. The story follows each brother as Nanba finds his inspiration, struggles through the JAXA tests and NASA training, while Hibito becomes the first Japanese astronaut to walk on the Moon but afterward wrestles with his unwanted fame and his crippling fears from a close brush with death.
- Sailor Moon. In this Japanese anime and manga series, the Moon was once home to the kingdom known as Silver Millennium, until a conflict between it and the Earth caused the Moon to take its current form. The titular heroine, the reincarnation of the princess of the aforementioned kingdom, is based on aspects of the Greek goddess Selene and Princess Kaguya. Her civilian name, Usagi Tsukino, is a play on words for Moon Rabbit "tsuki no usagi".
- Mr Moon is a 2010 children's TV series in which the main character is anthropomorphism of the Moon exploring the Solar System with his friends.
- In the manga and anime series Naruto, the Moon was created by Hagoromo Otsutsuki to contain the transformed and powerless husk of his mother Kaguya. The dwindling descendants of his brother Hamura safe guarding the Gedo Statue until it was stolen by Madara Uchiha for his Project Tsuki no Me agenda.
- Planetes (2003). A Japanese anime television series set at a time when travel to the Moon has become an everyday occurrence.
- Mobile Suit Gundam. Throughout most of this anime saga, the Moon has been extensively colonised, with underground cities built inside of the larger craters.
- Exosquad. In this American military science fiction series, the Moon is the site of the fiercest battle between Terran and Neosapien forces. The victory achieved by the Terrans on the Moon soon leads to the liberation of Earth.
- A Grand Day Out (1989) the first Wallace and Gromit short film is about the two building a rocket to get to the Moon, which is made of cheese.
- Futurama. By the year 3000, a theme park has been constructed on the Moon inside a giant dome with an artificial atmosphere, and an artificial gravity. First seen in the second episode The Series Has Landed.
- Megas XLR. on one episode the Glorft attempt to convert the Moon into a Missile. Coop also ends up blowing up half the Moon (in the credits, he is seen putting the Moon back together).
- Codename: Kids Next Door. The headquarters of the KND organization is a treehouse built on the Moon.
- Aqua Teen Hunger Force. Among the recurring characters are the Mooninites, which hail from the Moon.
- Tengen Toppa Gurren Lagann. The Moon is used by the Anti-Spirals as the "Human Extermination System", and is designed to fall on the Earth once a million humans live on the surface. It is later discovered that the Moon is actually one of Lord Genome's battleships.
- Origin: Spirits of the Past. An anime film set in Japan 300 years in the future. An apocalypse was brought about by extensive genetic engineering on trees, conducted at a research facility on the Moon, in order to produce trees capable of growing in harsh, arid conditions. The trees became conscious and spread to Earth in a fiery holocaust, wiping out most of modern civilization and fragmenting the Moon.
- The Tick. Supervillain Chairface Chippendale attempts to create the ultimate act of vandalism by writing his name on the Moon's surface with a powerful laser. He is only able to write "CHA" before being thwarted by the Tick.
- Despicable Me (2010)
- Avatar: The Last Airbender: The Moon is a major part of the lore and spirituality of the Water Tribes. According to legend, the first waterbenders learned how to bend water by watching the Moon's gravity push and pull the water and were eventually able to do so themselves.
- In Space Jam, Mr. Swackhammer, the villain of the film gets sent there at the end of the game by the Monstars.
- In Transformers: Armada, The Mini-Con ship Exodus crash-landed on the Moon, scattering its stasis-locked passengers all over Earth. Later, the Decepticons would set up a base inside the derelict ship, from where they would teleport to various locations on Earth to search for the Mini-Cons.
- In official supplemental materials for Neon Genesis Evangelion, the impact that created the Moon – known in-universe as First Impact – is revealed to have been caused by the "Black Moon", an artificial construct carrying the Angel Lilith; as an allusion, Rei Ayanami is frequently depicted in the series and in official artwork with a full moon motif. During Third Impact as depicted in The End of Evangelion, Lilith's blood is shown to splatter onto the Moon from low Earth orbit. In the Rebuild of Evangelion films, the existence of NERV's Tabgha Lunar Base is revealed. Various features depicted on the surface in the first film include a large red stain not unlike the one created by Lilith in The End of Evangelion, a series of coffin-like objects – one of which is revealed to contain Kaworu Nagisa – and a large humanoid entity resembling Lilith's original depiction. In the second film, Gendo Ikari and Kozou Fuyutsuki travel to the base in a large spacecraft but are denied entry; they subsequently observe the giant entity from above, revealing it as the under-construction Evangelion Mark.06.
- In My Little Pony: Friendship Is Magic, the Moon and the Sun are raised each day and night by two alicorn princesses called Luna and Celestia, respectively. A thousand years prior to the first episode, Luna grew jealous that the ponies living in the world slept during her night, and tried to make the night last forever, taking the name 'Nightmare Moon'. Celestia subsequently banished her to the Moon, and arranged for the show's main characters to assist in redeeming her.
- In Steven Universe, the Moon has an ancient base that belonged to Pink Diamond.
- In the anime series Inazuma Eleven GO, antagonist Bitway Ozrock seals the Moon away to demonstrate his true strength, and uses the effects of its absence on the Earth to coerce the World's joint governments to agree to his demands.
- At the end of the Arthur episode "The Boy Who Cried Comet", Arthur and his friends are shown unmasking themselves, showing them as aliens who live in a city on the far side of the Moon.
- In the Teen Titans Go! episode "Starfire the Terrible", Starfire destroys the moon after becoming a supervillain to provide Robin with an archnemesis.
- SpongeBob SquarePants. In "Sandy's Rocket," SpongeBob and Patrick take Sandy's rocket to what they think is the Moon, but they are still in Bikini Bottom. Trouble endues when they capture all the citizens, thinking they're aliens. In "Mooncation", Sandy goes to the moon for a vacation with SpongeBob.
- Hanazuki: Full of Treasures. In this series, the moonflowers are species that plant Treasure Trees to protect their moons from the Big Bad.
- Mixels. In the episode "Mixel Moon Madness", it is revealed that there are Mixels that live on the Moon. There are Oribitons which are space-themed Mixels and Glowkies which are nocturnal-based creatures.
- Legends of Chima. In the episode "The Hundred Year Moon", it is said that once every hundred years for two nights the Moon makes the Wolf Tribe go to their barbaric side.
- Kido Senkan Nadeshiko. Earth comes under attack from the descendants of exiled Lunar separatists. United Earth is shown to have a base on the Moon.
- Aldnoah.Zero. The Moon was the site of a hypergate built by an ancient civilization that enabled transport between it and Mars. Due to the hypergate going out of control due to fighting on the Moon's surface during the First Earth-Mars War, part of the Moon was destroyed.
- Land of the Lustrous. The Moon people (also called “lunarians”) are a race of humanoid beings who are the villains and capture the gems (lustrous) and use them as jewelry.
- DuckTales (2017). As seen in the Season 1 finale, Huey, Dewey, and Louie's mother, Della Duck, has been stuck on the Moon for a decade after crashing there. She eventually returns to the Earth, but the Moon aliens (who she tried to befriend with) launched the invasion on the Earth because they wanted to have the Earth revolve around the Moon instead of the opposite, but this plan fails.

== See also ==
- Colonization of the Moon
- Moon in science fiction
- Moon landings in fiction
- Apollo 11 in popular culture
- The Moon is made of green cheese
- List of fictional astronauts (Project Apollo era)
- List of fictional astronauts (futuristic exploration of Moon)
