= Menace from the Moon =

Menace from the Moon may refer to:

- Menace from the Moon (1925 novel), a 1925 science-fiction novel by Bohun Lynch
- The US title (1959) for Hugh Walters' juvenile science-fiction work The Domes of Pico (UK, 1958)
