= Moon in science fiction =

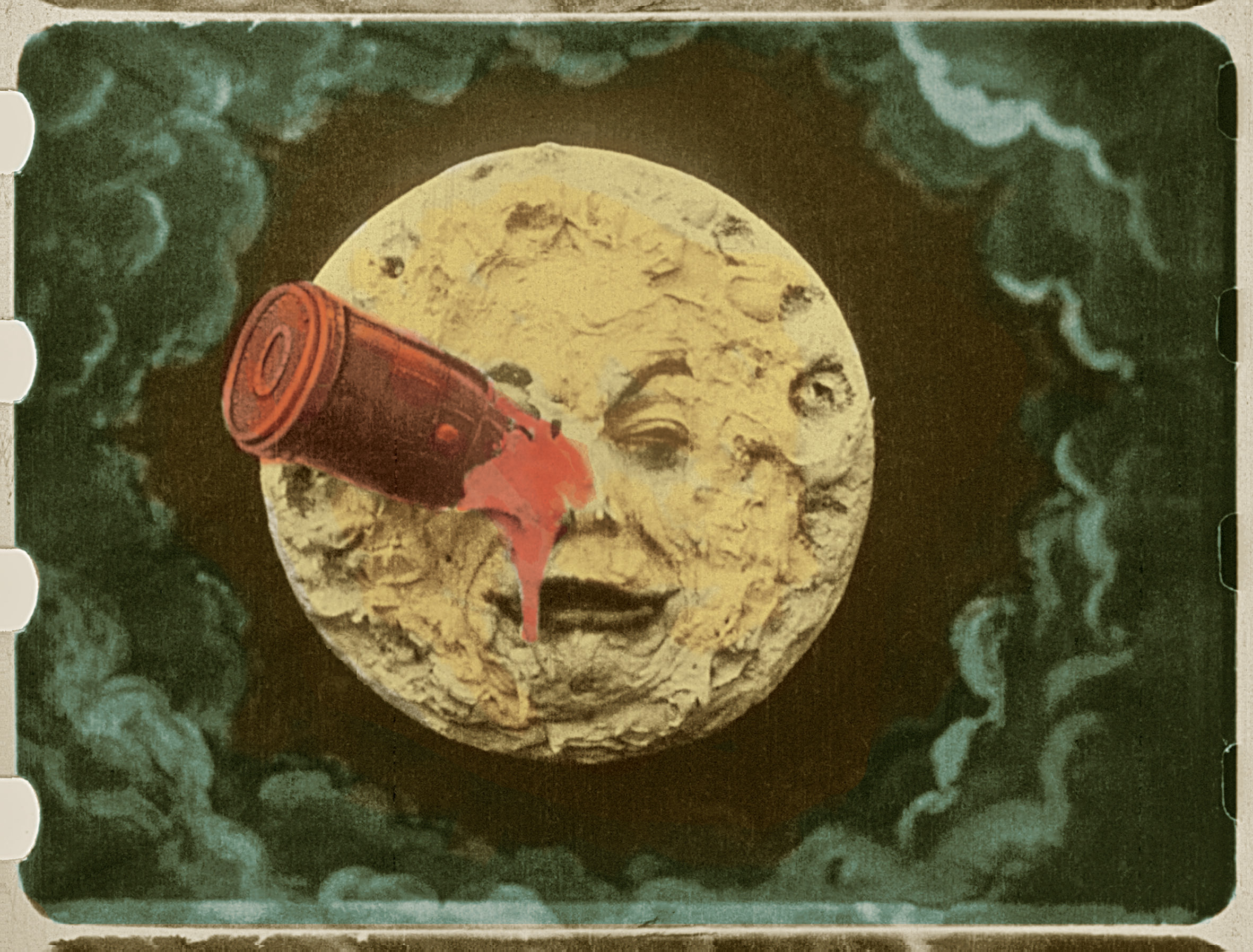
A still image of the Man in the Moon from the 1902 film Le voyage dans la lune

The Moon has appeared in fiction as a setting since at least classical antiquity. Throughout most of literary history, a significant portion of works depicting lunar voyages has been satirical in nature. From the late 19th century onwards, science fiction has successively focused largely on the themes of life on the Moon, first Moon landings, and lunar colonization.

== Early depictions ==
The Moon has been a setting in fiction since at least the works of the ancient Greek writers Antonius Diogenes and Lucian of Samosata; the former's Of the Wonderful Things Beyond Thule has been lost and the latter's True History from the second century CE is a satire of fanciful travellers' tales. It was not until Johannes Kepler's novel Somnium was posthumously released in 1634 that the subject of travelling to the Moon was given a serious treatment in fiction. Building on Kepler's thoughts, and similar speculations by Francis Bacon on flying to the Moon in his 1627 work Sylva sylvarum, Francis Godwin expanded on the idea in the 1638 novel The Man in the Moone. Across the centuries that followed, numerous authors penned serious or satirical works depicting voyages to the Moon, including Cyrano de Bergerac's novel Comical History of the States and Empires of the Moon which was posthumously released in 1657, Daniel Defoe's 1705 novel The Consolidator, Edgar Allan Poe's 1835 short story "The Unparalleled Adventure of One Hans Pfaall", the 1835 newspaper series called the "Great Moon Hoax" by Richard Adams Locke, Jules Verne's 1865 novel From the Earth to the Moon, and H. G. Wells' 1901 novel The First Men in the Moon. George Griffith's 1901 novel A Honeymoon in Space takes place in part on the Moon and is perhaps the first depiction of a space suit in fiction. The first science fiction film, Georges Méliès' Le voyage dans la lune from 1902, depicts a lunar voyage.

== Life on the Moon ==
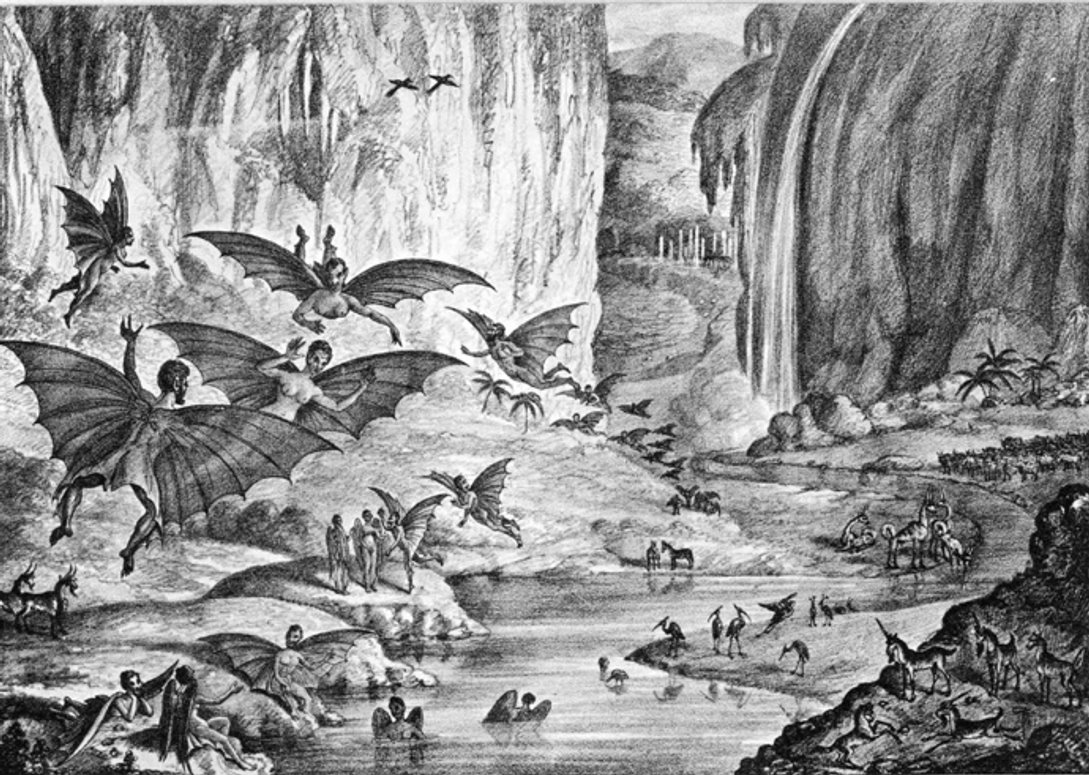
Life on the Moon as depicted in the "Great Moon Hoax"

By the latter part of the 1800s, it was clear that the Moon was devoid of life, making depictions of lunar lifeforms and societies lack credibility. One consequence of this was that setting stories on Mars instead increased in popularity. A number of authors circumvent the issue by placing lunar life underneath the Moon's surface, including Wells in the aforementioned The First Men in the Moon and Edgar Rice Burroughs in the 1926 novel The Moon Maid. Others confine lunar life to the past, either depicting the remnants of a lunar civilization that has since gone extinct as in W. S. Lach-Szyrma's 1887–1893 series "Letters from the Planets" (sequel to the 1883 novel Aleriel, or A Voyage to Other Worlds), Edgar Fawcett's 1895 novel The Ghost of Guy Thyrle, and the aforementioned A Honeymoon in Space, or by time travelling to the past to encounter lunar life as in the 1932 short story "The Moon Era" by Jack Williamson. Some works also place lunar life solely on the far side of the Moon. In the 1977 novel Inherit the Stars by James P. Hogan, an ancient human skeleton in a spacesuit is found on the Moon, leading to the discovery that humanity did not originate on Earth.

The life that has been depicted on the Moon varies in size from the intelligent mollusks of Raymond Z. Gallun's 1931 short story "The Lunar Chrysalis" to the giants of Godwin's aforementioned The Man in the Moone. The "Great Moon Hoax" features bat-like humanoids, which according to its author Richard Adams Locke was meant to satirize the then-popular belief that the Moon was home to advanced civilizations. The earliest depiction of life on the Moon in Lucian's True History included three-headed horse-vultures and vegetable birds. The near side of the Moon in Kepler's Somnium is inhabited by the earliest human-like lunar life in fiction, whereas the far side is inhabited by serpentine creatures. Based on exobiological considerations, Kepler provided both with adaptations to the month-long cycle of day and night on the Moon. The 1938 short story "Magician of Dream Valley" by Raymond Z. Gallun portrays energy-based life on the Moon, as does the 1960 short story "The Trouble with Tycho" by Clifford D. Simak. The titular mission of the 2011 film Apollo 18 is a secret project to investigate alien life in the form of lunar rocks.

== Moon landings ==
The success of Apollo 11 marked the end of science fiction stories about the first Moon landing.

Following the end of World War II, several literary works appeared depicting science fiction authors' visions of the first Moon landing. Among these were Robert A. Heinlein's 1950 short story "The Man Who Sold the Moon" about an entrepreneur seeking to finance the endeavor, Lester del Rey's 1956 novel Mission to the Moon, and Pierre Boulle's 1964 novel Garden on the Moon where the first Moon landing is by Japan and intentionally a one-way trip such that no method of returning astronauts to Earth needs to be devised. One of the last such stories was William F. Temple's 1966 novel Shoot at the Moon; following the actual first Moon landing by Apollo 11 in 1969, stories of fictional first Moon landings fell out of favour to be replaced by stories of lunar colonization.

Fictional first Moon landings also appeared in film in this era. Examples include the 1950 film Destination Moon which envisions the first Moon landing as a private sector venture and the 1968 film Countdown which reuses the idea of getting to the Moon more quickly by not waiting until a return trip is feasible from Garden on the Moon.

== Colonization of the Moon ==
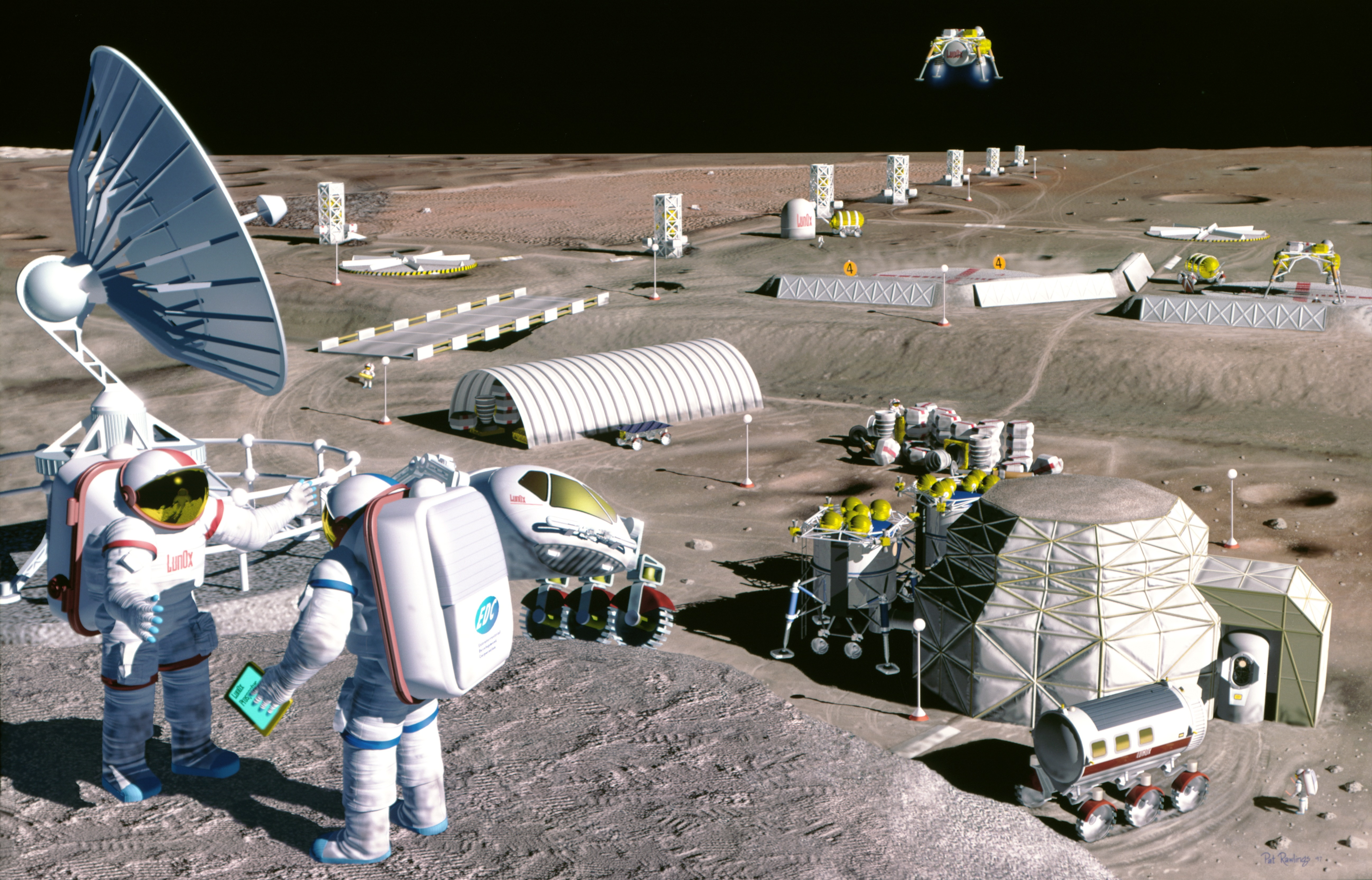
A lunar base as envisaged by NASA

An early example of colonization of the Moon is found in The Lunar Trilogy of Polish writer Jerzy Żuławski, written between 1901 and 1911. There, a small colony is founded by survivors of the marooned exploration party. Colonization of the Moon is depicted in Murray Leinster's 1950s Joe Kenmore series starting with the novel Space Platform, Larry Niven's 1980 novel The Patchwork Girl, and Roger MacBride Allen's 1988 novel Farside Cannon, among others. Lunar colonies are sometimes humanity's last refuge when the Earth is no longer habitable, as in Arthur C. Clarke's 1951 short story "If I Forget Thee, Oh Earth" where the Earth has succumbed to nuclear holocaust and Stephen Baxter's 1998 novel Moonseed where the Earth is destroyed by an alien nanotechnology from the Moon itself. The Moon is terraformed in a handful of works including the 1991 novel Reunion by John Gribbin and Marcus Chown.

The residents of lunar colonies often seek independence from Earth. The 1931 novel The Birth of a New Republic by Jack Williamson and Miles J. Breuer adapts the story of the American Revolutionary War to the lunar surface. In Heinlein's 1966 novel The Moon Is a Harsh Mistress, the prisoners of a penal colony on the Moon revolt. In the 1997 novel Moonwar by Ben Bova (part of his Grand Tour series), the proposition is rejected by Earth on the grounds that the Moon is not self-sufficient but relies on resources imported from Earth. Lunar colonies are also used as military bases in several works. Heinlein's 1947 novel Rocket Ship Galileo—upon which the aforementioned Destination Moon was loosely based—depicts the discovery of a secret Nazi German colony on the Moon upon the arrival of what was thitherto thought to be the first crewed lunar landing. Leinster's 1957 novel City on the Moon portrays a US nuclear missile base on the Moon which functions as a deterrent, as does Allen Steele's 1996 alternate history novel The Tranquillity Alternative.

The social structure and governance of fictional lunar colonies varies. Heinlein's aforementioned The Moon Is a Harsh Mistress and his 1985 novel The Cat Who Walks Through Walls portray lunar societies based on libertarian ideals such as laissez-faire capitalism, while the 1992 novel Steel Beach by John Varley depicts a post-scarcity society where the central authority guarantees both jobs for all who wish to work and access to necessities such as air, food, and heating. In Nancy Holder's 1998–2000 novel trilogy starting with The Six Families, organized crime families vie for control. The Moon is a tourist destination in Clarke's 1961 novel A Fall of Moondust. The first permanent lunar colony contends with social ills such as drug addiction in the 1973 short story "Luna 1" by Ernest H. Taves, and the 1957 short story "The Lineman" by Walter M. Miller Jr. provides a rare example of considering the possible effects of the Moon's lower gravity on human reproduction and child development. The lunar colony in the 1991 novel Lunar Descent by Allen Steele is inhabited by manual labourers engaged in space mining to extract resources from the lunar surface. The degenerated colonists of Żuławski's Lunar Trilogy develop a religion worshipping Earth, and welcome a returning Earth astronaut as a Messiah.

== See also ==
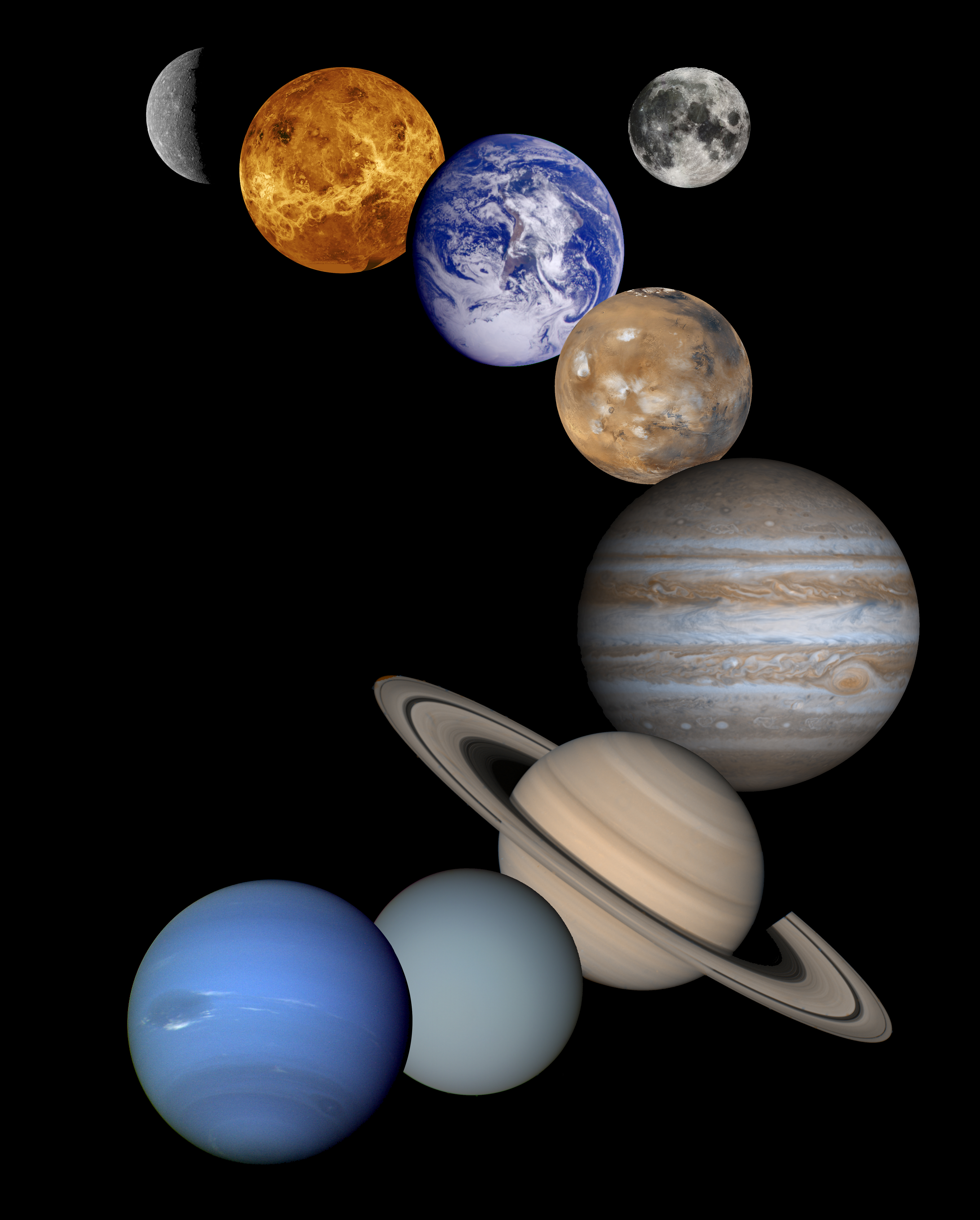
Clicking on a planet leads to the article about its depiction in fiction.

- Great Science Fiction Stories About the Moon – 1967 anthology by T. E. Dikty
- List of appearances of the Moon in fiction
- List of fictional astronauts (Project Apollo era)
- List of fictional astronauts (futuristic exploration of Moon)
- Solar System in fiction
