= Relicta =

2020 video game

- Developer: Mighty Polygon
- Publisher: Ravenscourt
- Engine: Unreal Engine 4
- Platforms: Windows; PlayStation 4; Xbox One; Google Stadia; Nintendo Switch
- Release: Windows, PlayStation 4, Xbox One, Stadia; August 4, 2020; Nintendo Switch; April 15, 2021
- Genre: Puzzle
- Mode: Single-player

Relicta is a 2020 first-person puzzle video game developed by Spanish studio Mighty Polygon and published by Ravenscourt. Set in 2120, it follows physicist Angelica Patel as she responds to a crisis at Chandra Base, a research facility on the Moon. The player uses a pair of gloves to alter the magnetic polarity and gravitational properties of objects, combining attraction, repulsion and weightlessness to complete environmental puzzles.

Relicta was released for Windows, PlayStation 4, Xbox One and Google Stadia in August 2020. A Nintendo Switch version, containing two additional missions, followed in April 2021. The game received mixed or average reviews for its PC and PlayStation 4 versions and generally favorable reviews for its Xbox One version. Critics generally praised its central physics mechanics, puzzle design and varied environments, while criticizing its narrative presentation, repetition and uneven difficulty.

== Gameplay ==
Relicta is played from a first-person perspective. The player explores Chandra Base and a series of experiment tracks situated within its terraformed lunar craters. Each track contains a sequence of environmental puzzles in which the player must transport metal cubes to pressure plates, operate switches and open force fields leading to the exit.

The player assumes control of Angelica Patel, who is equipped with a pair of gravitoelectromagnetic gloves. The player can give compatible cubes and panels either positive or negative magnetic polarity. Objects with opposing polarities attract one another, while objects with matching polarities repel each other. The gloves can also suppress the effect of gravity on cubes, causing them to float and allowing magnetic forces to propel them across gaps or through otherwise inaccessible passages.

Early puzzles involve placing individual cubes on pressure plates, but later tracks introduce timed switches, differently coloured force fields, teleporters and drones that remove magnetic and anti-gravity effects. Cubes can also be used as moving platforms or elevators, requiring the player to ride them while changing their polarity. Puzzle areas are arranged within different artificial biomes, including forests, deserts, icy caverns and rainforests.

Progression is predominantly linear. After completing a group of experiment tracks, the player returns to the central areas of Chandra Base, where the story advances through conversations with other researchers. Emails, news reports, diary entries and other documents can be collected and read through Patel's personal data assistant, providing additional information about the base and the Relicta.

== Development ==
Relicta was the debut game of Mighty Polygon, an independent studio based in Valencia, Spain. Producer and programmer Santi Alex Mañas stated that the game was developed over approximately three years by a core team of five people. The project grew from Pine Away, an earlier prototype that the studio had intended to develop commercially before concluding that it was not viable. Elements of its puzzle design were retained and expanded into Relicta.

Mañas said that members of the studio were fans of puzzle games such as Portal and The Witness, but wanted to create a mechanically distinct game. The central system emerged from experiments in combining magnetism and gravity, which the developers found easy to understand while allowing for increasingly complex interactions. Additional mechanics were introduced gradually across the game's different biomes so that players could learn their applications before encountering more difficult combinations.

The game was developed using Unreal Engine 4. Mañas said that the engine allowed the team to adjust the game's visual presentation and performance for the PlayStation 4 and PlayStation 4 Pro. Mighty Polygon recorded the dialogue in English rather than Spanish because the cost of producing multiple voice tracks required the studio to select the language with the widest international reach.

Ravenscourt announced in March 2020 that it would publish Relicta for PlayStation 4, Xbox One, Windows and Stadia. The game was released for those platforms on August 4, 2020.

The game was initially developed for PC, requiring the team to reduce and optimize its graphical assets for the Nintendo Switch while attempting to maintain a stable frame rate in both handheld and docked modes. The Switch version was released on April 15, 2021. It included two additional missions, Aegir Gig and Ice Queen, which were also released as free downloadable content for the other versions.

== Plot ==
In 2120, Chandra Base is a research facility established within several terraformed craters on the Moon. The station was previously controlled by Aegir Labs, a company that developed technology substantially more advanced than that available elsewhere. After the Seventy-Two Minute War devastated much of Earth, Aegir was dissolved and Chandra Base was repurposed for a joint scientific expedition intended to encourage cooperation between the former combatants.

Dr. Angelica Patel leads the expedition and investigates the source of Aegir's technological advances. The researchers discover the Relicta, an anomalous object consisting of stone and crystalline material, and bring it into the station for examination. Patel also develops gravitoelectromagnetic gloves that allow their wearer to manipulate magnetism and gravity.

The game opens during an emergency, with Patel entering the Relicta's containment chamber and apparently being absorbed by the object. The narrative then returns to the period immediately before the incident, when Patel's daughter Kira is travelling from Earth to join the expedition. An event involving the Relicta damages the station, endangers its inhabitants and interrupts contact with the outside world.

After regaining consciousness with fragments of the Relicta embedded within her body, Patel travels between Chandra Base's biodomes to repair its systems and re-establish communications. The Relicta begins communicating with her and gradually adopts human language. As Patel completes the abandoned experimental tracks, she uncovers the object's connection to Aegir's technology and attempts to prevent the crisis from threatening Kira and the other researchers.

== Reception ==
Reception

Aggregate scores
Aggregator	Score
Metacritic	74/100 (PC); 71/100 (PS4); 78/100 (XONE)
OpenCritic	47%

Review scores
Publication	Score
Adventure Gamers	4.5/5
HobbyConsolas	78/100
MeriStation	6.8/10
The Games Machine (UK)	7.2/10
Vandal	7.5/10

According to review aggregator Metacritic, the PC and PlayStation 4 versions of Relicta received "mixed or average" reviews, with respective weighted average scores of 74 and 71 out of 100. The Xbox One version received "generally favorable" reviews, with a score of 78 out of 100. OpenCritic calculated an average score of 75 out of 100 based on 30 reviews and categorized the game's critical reception as "Strong".

The game's magnetism and gravity mechanics were generally regarded as its strongest feature. Adventure Gamers praised the variety of interactions developed from the central system and the visual contrast between Chandra Base's different biomes. The reviewer found most of the experiment tracks well designed, but criticized levels in which dense scenery made the available puzzle elements difficult to identify and objected to the absence of checkpoints within individual tracks.

David Martínez of HobbyConsolas praised the gradual evolution of the puzzles and the ways cubes could be used as platforms, elevators and projectiles. He also complimented the science-fiction atmosphere and environmental detail, while finding the limited exploration and uninterrupted succession of puzzles repetitive during longer sessions. Ramón Varela of Vandal similarly considered magnetism an effective variation on established first-person puzzle conventions. He praised the environmental variety and visual quality achieved by the small development team, but found that the narrative sequences sometimes interrupted the gameplay and that some puzzle structures became repetitive.

Borja Ruete of MeriStation considered the construction and completion of the more difficult puzzles satisfying, but criticized the abrupt increase in difficulty and the game's length. He also found the narrative insufficiently integrated with the puzzle gameplay, describing its characters and dialogue as unable to sustain the more dramatic portions of the story. The Games Machine regarded the level design as appropriately challenging but found that bugs and imprecise interactions prevented the game from fully realizing its mechanics.

== See also ==
- List of appearances of the Moon in fiction
