= Great Moon Hoax =

Series of fabricated newspaper articles published in 1835

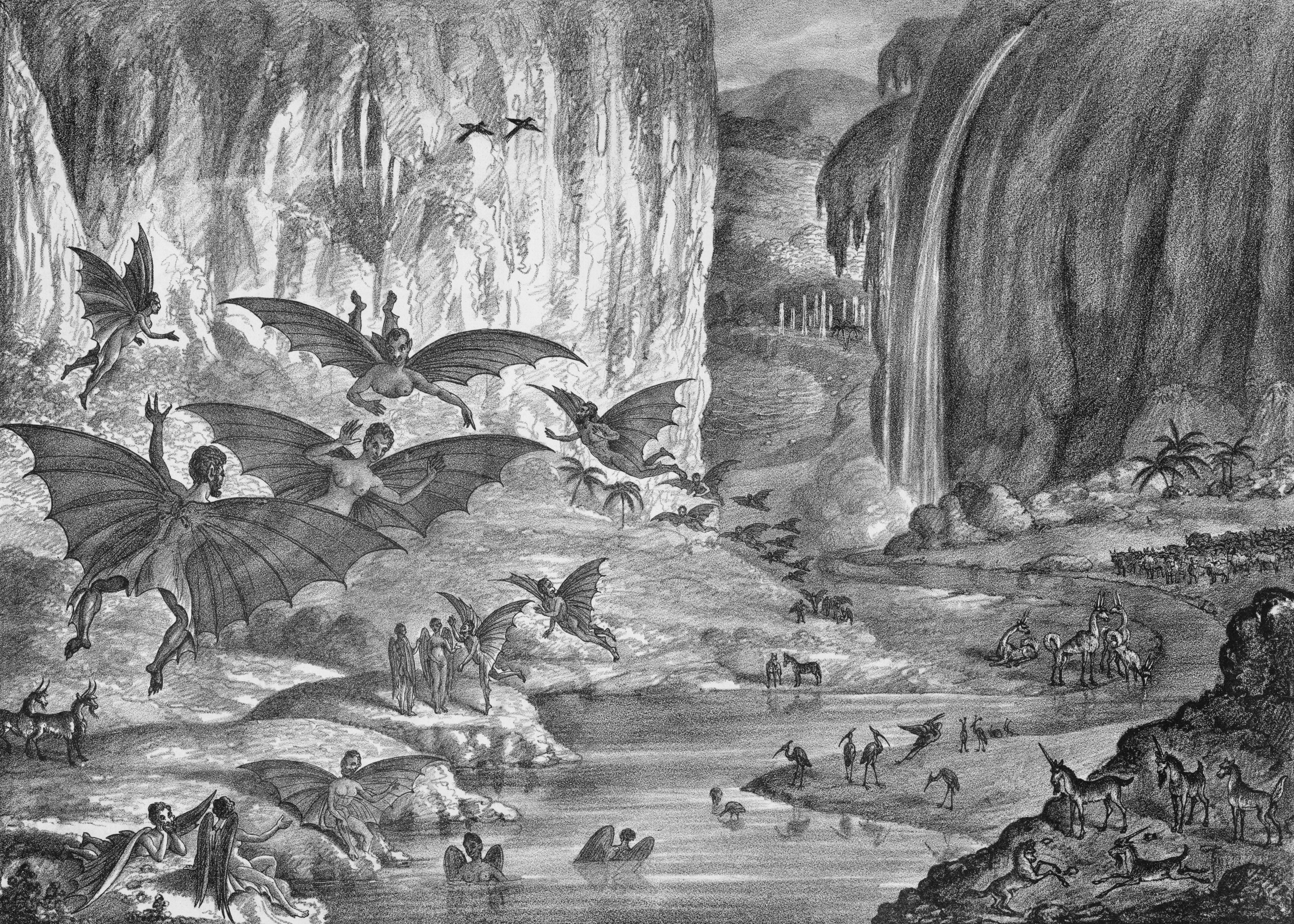
A lithograph of the hoax's "ruby amphitheater", as printed in The Sun

The "Great Moon Hoax", also known as the "Great Moon Hoax of 1835", was a series of six articles published in New York newspaper The Sun, beginning on August 25, 1835, about the supposed discovery of life and civilization on the Moon. The discoveries were falsely attributed to Sir John Herschel and his fictitious companion Andrew Grant.

The story was advertised on August 21, 1835, as an upcoming feature allegedly reprinted from The Edinburgh Courant. The first in a series of six was published four days later on August 25. These articles were never retracted; however, on September 16, 1835, The Sun admitted the articles were in fact fabricated.

The hoax came at a time when readers looked for entertainment as much as information from penny press newspapers, which would later change with the development of ethical journalism.

== Hoax ==
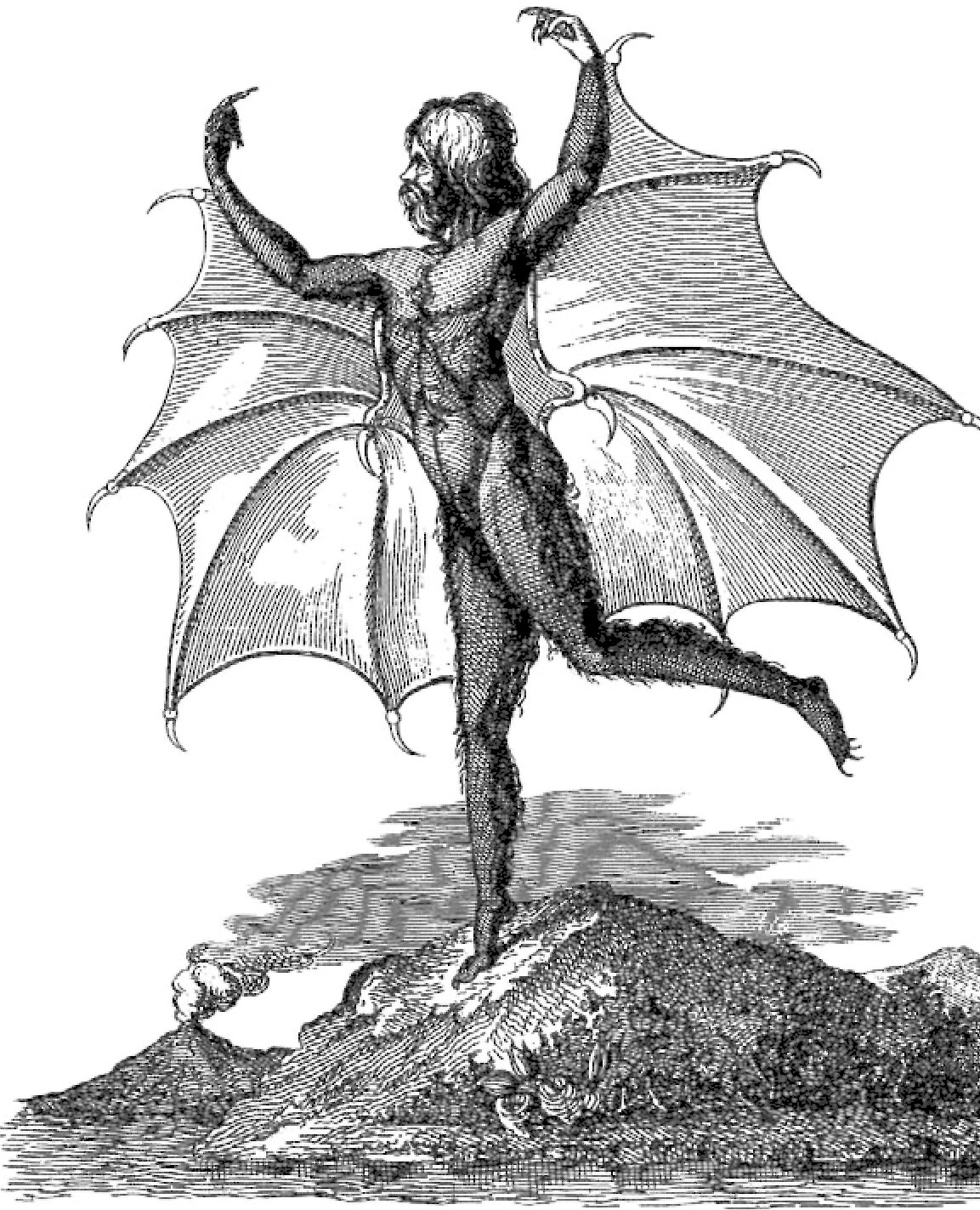
Portrait of a man-bat ("Vespertilio-homo"), from an edition of the Moon series published in Naples

The headline read:

GREAT ASTRONOMICAL DISCOVERIES,
LATELY MADE
BY SIR JOHN HERSCHEL, L.L.D. F.R.S. &c.
At the Cape of Good Hope.
[From Supplement to the Edinburgh Journal of Science.]

The articles described animals on the Moon, including bison, single-horned goats, mini zebras, unicorns, bipedal tail-less beavers and bat-like winged humanoids ("Vespertilio-homo") who built temples. There were trees, oceans and beaches. These discoveries were supposedly made with "an immense telescope of an entirely new principle". The telescope, transported to South Africa from New England, was said to be many times larger than any other telescope in the world. The lens measured "24 feet in diameter and 7 tons in weight".

"Vespertilio-homo" can be translated from Latin as man-bat, bat-man, or man-bats.

A reprinted edition of 1836 added a second type, named the Vespertiliones. The author of the narrative was ostensibly Dr. Andrew Grant, the travelling companion and amanuensis of Sir John Herschel, but Grant was fictitious.

Eventually, the authors announced that the observations had been terminated by the destruction of the telescope. They reported that the Sun had caused the lens of the telescope to act as a "burning glass", setting fire to the observatory.

== Authorship ==
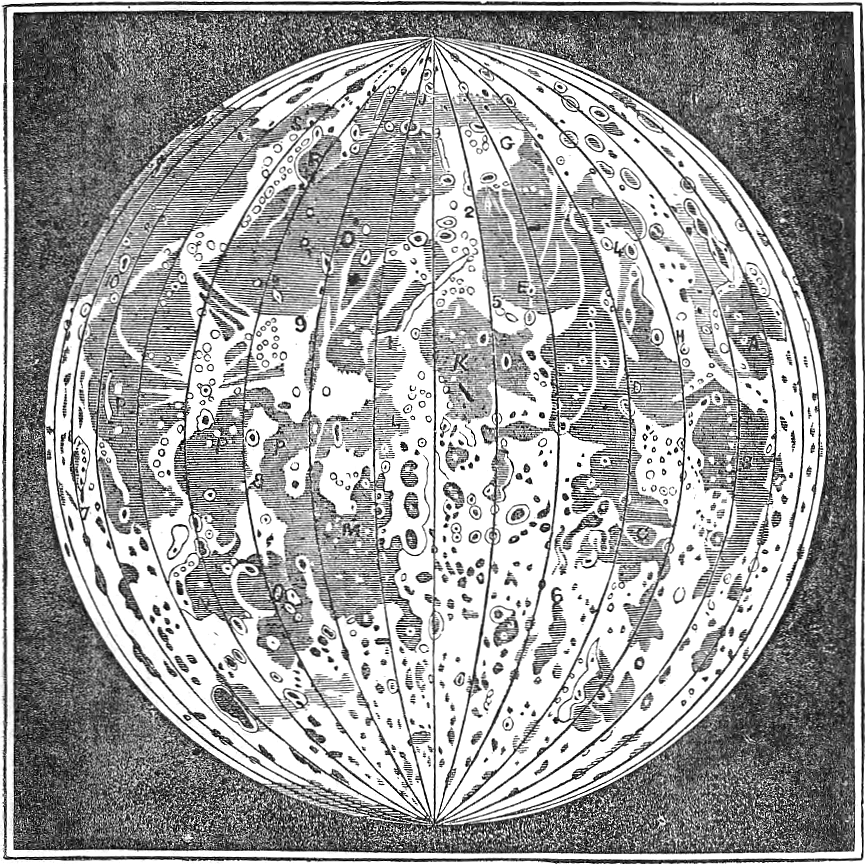
View of the Moon Hoax

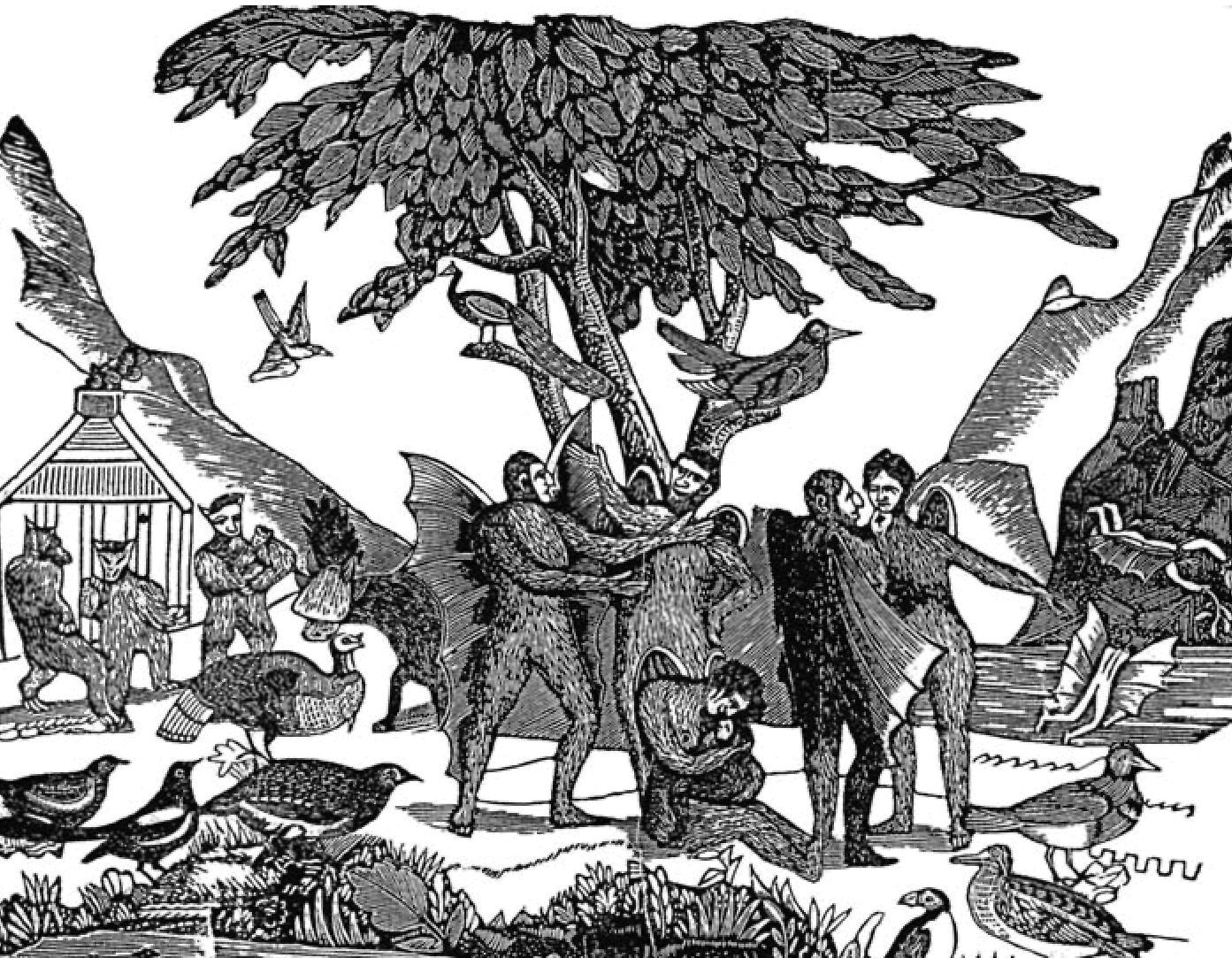
The Inhabitants of the Moon, 1836, Welsh edition

The writer of the article was at first not known to the public. Authorship has subsequently been attributed to Richard Adams Locke (1800–1871), a reporter who, in August 1835, was working for The Sun. Locke publicly admitted to being the author in 1840, in a letter to the weekly paper New World. Despite Locke's claims, rumours persisted that others were involved in the articles' creation.

Two other men have been noted in connection with the hoax: Jean-Nicolas Nicollet, a French astronomer travelling in America at the time (though he was in Mississippi, not New York, when the Moon-hoax issues appeared), and Lewis Gaylord Clark, editor of The Knickerbocker, a literary magazine. However, there is no good evidence to indicate that anyone but Locke was the author of the hoax.

Assuming that Locke was the author, his intentions were probably, first, to create a sensational story which would increase sales of The Sun, and, second, to ridicule some of the more extravagant astronomical theories that had recently been published. Locke had meant for the hoax to act as a satire to show how science can be and is influenced by the thoughts of religion. For instance, in 1824, Franz von Paula Gruithuisen, professor of astronomy at the Ludwig-Maximilians-Universität München, had published a paper titled "Discovery of Many Distinct Traces of Lunar Inhabitants, Especially of One of Their Colossal Buildings". One theory is that this paper is responsible for inspiring the articles written by Locke. In his paper, Gruithuisen claimed to have observed various shades of color on the lunar surface, which he correlated with climate and vegetation zones. He also observed lines and geometrical shapes, which he felt indicated the existence of walls, roads, fortifications, and cities.

== Reactions ==
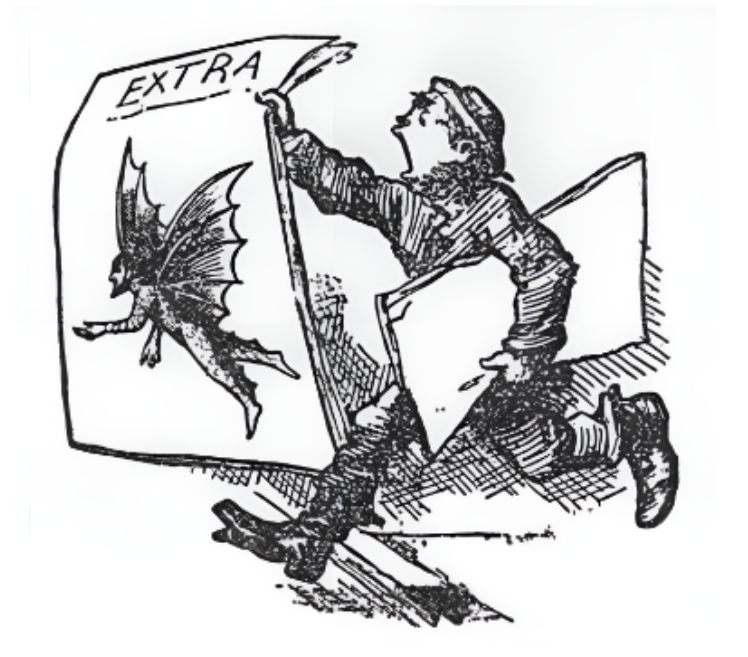
Newsboy showing a copy of the hoax

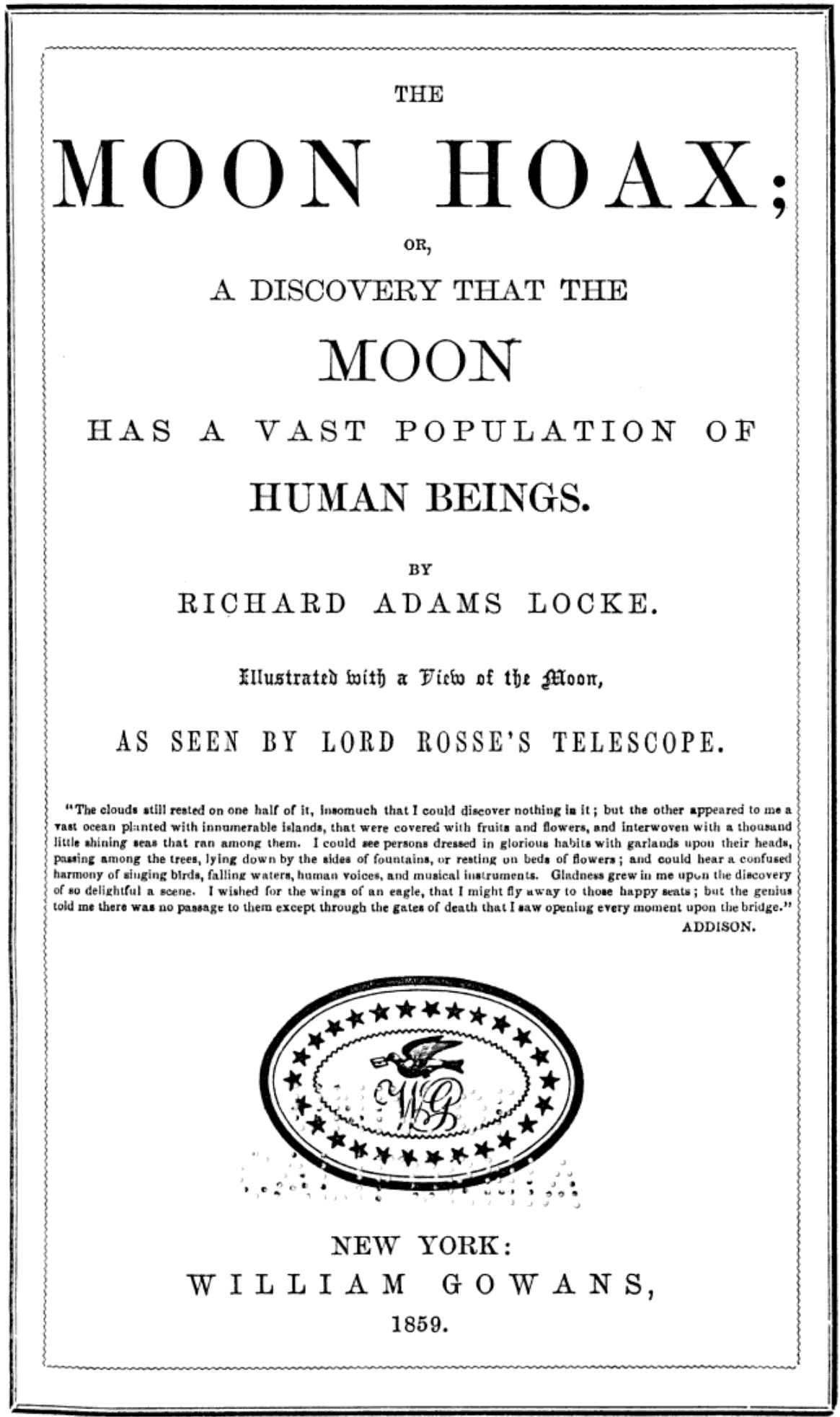
Moon Hoax, 1859 NY William Gowans, Richard Adams Locke

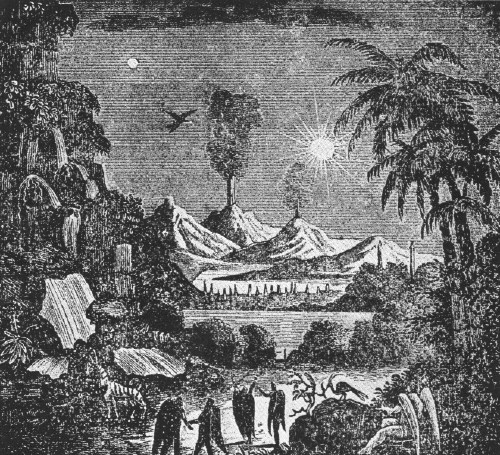
Moonscene

According to legend, The Sun's circulation increased dramatically because of the hoax and remained permanently greater than before, thereby establishing The Sun as a successful paper. It brought the journal to international fame, and the hoax resembled crime reports that allowed the readers to play detective, trying to discover the truth.

However, the degree to which the hoax increased the paper's circulation has certainly been exaggerated in popular accounts of the event. It was not discovered to be a hoax for several weeks after its publication and, even then, the newspaper did not issue a retraction.

Herschel was initially amused by the hoax, noting that his own real observations could never be as exciting. He later became annoyed when he had to answer questions from people who believed the hoax was serious.

Edgar Allan Poe claimed the story was a plagiarism of his earlier work "The Unparalleled Adventure of One Hans Pfaall", published in the Southern Literary Messenger. (He later published "The Balloon-Hoax" in the same newspaper.) The story was reprinted in the New York Transcript on September 2–5, 1835, under the headline "Lunar Discoveries, Extraordinary Aerial Voyage by Baron Hans Pfaall".

Poe described a voyage to the Moon in a balloon, in which Pfaall lives for five years on the Moon with lunarians and sends back a lunarian to Earth. The Poe Moon hoax was less successful than Locke's because of the satiric and comical tone of the account. In 1846, Poe would write a biographical sketch of Locke as part of his series "The Literati of New York City" which appeared in Godey's Lady's Book.

== Context ==
Locke's sensational reports were not out of place in the context of the mass proliferation of penny press newspapers such as the New York Sun which received much of their income from advertisements, a business practice made sustainable by large numbers of readers. The Sun was a pioneer when it came to producing shocking and often sensationalist journalism, being the first New York newspaper to report on murders, suicides, personal events, and divorces, and it was because of stories such as these that the Sun thrived in attracting readers to their articles, and thus to their advertisements.

The success of such sensational stories as the "Great Moon Hoax" can be partly attributed to the influence of contemporary speculative science. Figures like the Reverend Thomas Dick, who claimed that the Moon was inhabited by billions of beings, had captured the public's imagination in the early 19th century. Locke's hoax played on similar popular beliefs, presenting them as the latest scientific findings from the well-respected astronomer Sir John Herschel, which lent the story credibility.

== In popular culture ==
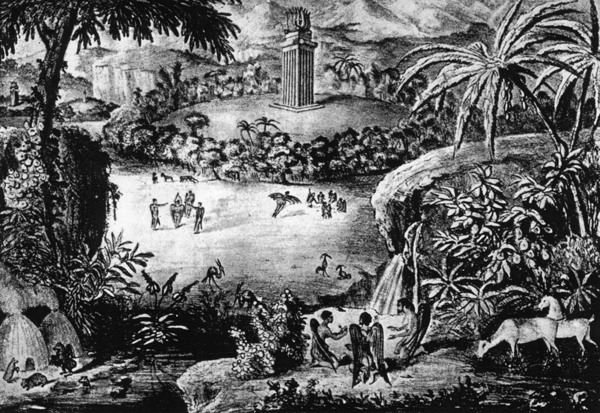
Great Moon Hoax, Edinburgh Journal of Science, by Lilith de Thierry Freres

The hoax is featured in Gotham: A History of New York City to 1898, winner of the Pulitzer Prize for History.

Nate DiMeo's historical podcast The Memory Palace dedicated a 2010 episode to the Great Moon Hoax entitled "The Moon in the Sun".

The hoax inspired a three-part musical by composer Matt Dahan as part of his musical radio series Pulp Musicals.

== See also ==
- Moon in science fiction
- "The Balloon Hoax", by Edgar Allan Poe, 1844
- Bat Boy (character)
- The Man in the Moone
- Martian canals
- Moon landing conspiracy theories
- A Trip to the Moon, a 1902 French science fiction film in which the Moon is inhabited by insect-like aliens
- A True Story, 2nd century novel written by Lucian of Samosata featuring bizarre encounters on the Moon
- The Lunar Trilogy
- "The War of the Worlds" (1938 radio drama)
