= Menace from the Moon (1925 novel) =

1925 novel by Bohun Lynch

- First edition
- Author: Bohun Lynch
- Genre: Science fiction
- Published: 1925 (Jarrolds)
- Publication place: United Kingdom
- Pages: 306
- OCLC: 4873772

Menace from the Moon is a 1925 science fiction novel by English writer Bohun Lynch, part of an "early twentieth-century flood of lunar fantasies" inaugurated by H. G. Wells' The First Men in the Moon (1901).

== Synopsis ==
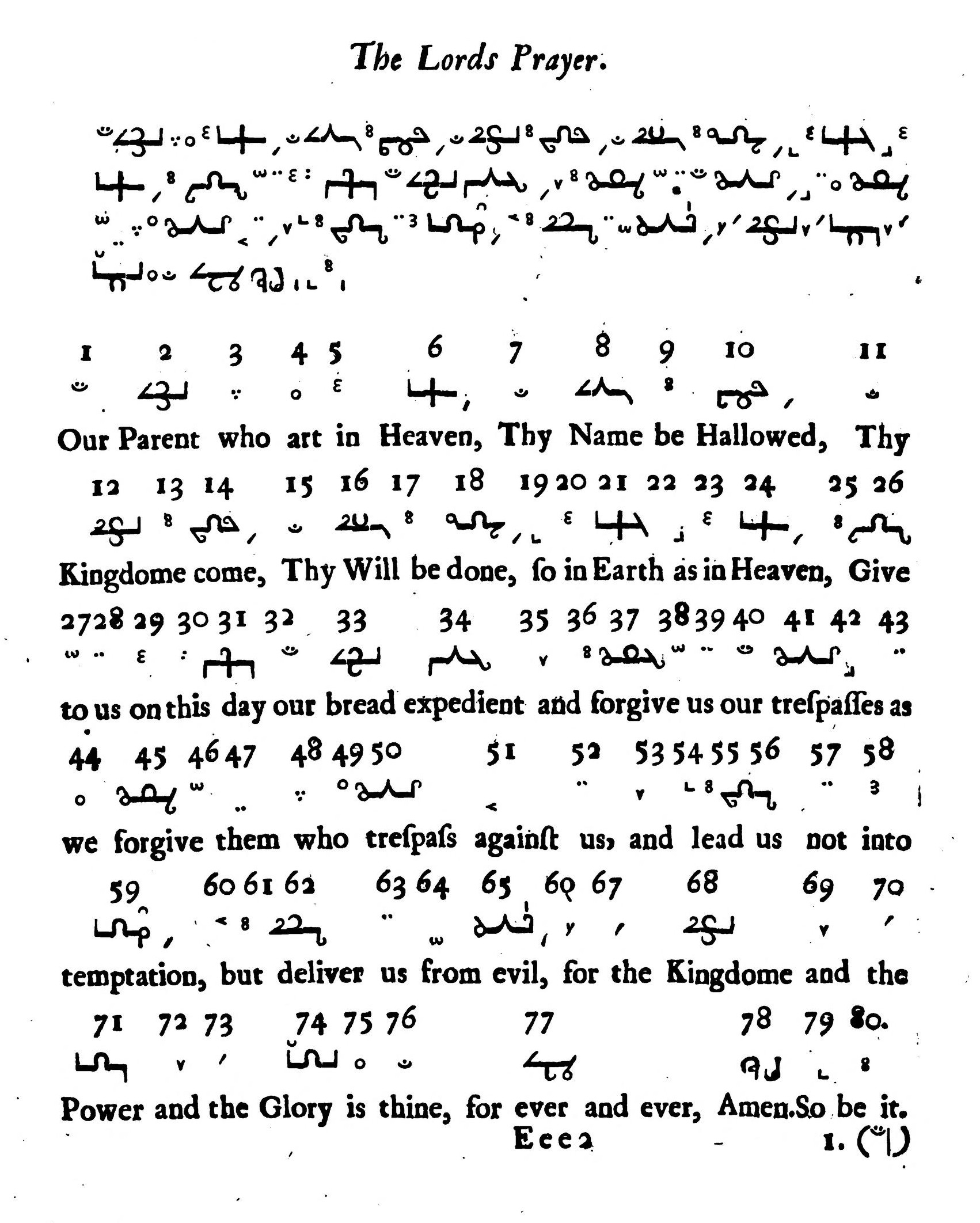
John Wilkins' "Real Character" (1668), at first mistaken (in Menace from the Moon) for the Thai alphabet

Inhabitants of the Moon‍—‌descendants of "a Dutchman, an Englishman, and an Italian" who in 1654 "with their women rose to the moon by the help of an admirable machine" ‍—‌find themselves threatened with extinction. Having lost the secrets of "the engine which brought our forefathers hither", they issue distress signals in the form of optical projections, onto the mists of Dartmoor, of the universal "Real Character" expounded by 17th-century bishop and polymath John Wilkins in his An Essay towards a Real Character, and a Philosophical Language (1668).

Unfortunately the earthlings, not having adopted the Wilkins plan themselves, have difficulty apprehending the import of these spectral presentments (mistaking them at first for "Siamese writing") and even once they do they lack the technology with which to respond. With time running out and their survival at stake, the impatient and irritable Moon-men determine to command the attention of their terrestrial cousins in a more compelling way, deploying a devastating heat-ray capable of boiling the oceans: "Hasten, hasten: help us to escape. Otherwise the whole earth will be burned dry and eaten up ... Answer us, fools!"

After a demonstration of this apparatus so unnerves visitors to an Italian resort that they are unable to enjoy their lunch, a frenzied search for plans to the 17th-century Moon-ship ends in frustration, a short scrap of Wilkinsese being all that is found once the plans' hiding place is discovered.

An anticlimax is reached when, just as the destruction of humanity seems inevitable, it is realized that these menacing messages had in fact been dispatched months earlier‍—‌an obscure phenomenon had delayed their transit‍—‌and that in the interim the Moon's infuriated denizens had inadvertently destroyed themselves through misfire of the very weapon with which they had sought to take revenge on what they believed to be an uncaring Earth. Explains Professor Lancelot Downey, the story's scientific protagonist: "I conceive the Moonfolk to be in the position of a native who, having learnt to fire a gun without knowing much about it, puts in three times the normal charge to produce a particularly deadly effect, and blows himself to pieces."

== Reception ==
One modern commentary has described the book as presenting "World peril, partly in the mode of a house party mystery story, partly in the manner of the early H. G. Wells ... Ingenious, literate, but somewhat clumsily handled." Another observed, "In the British tradition of novels where humanity is threatened, much of the action occurs in rural areas, the narrator is much more an observer than an active player in events, and technical issues‍—‌how 17th-century scientists managed to get to the moon‍—‌are simply ignored."

== Acknowledgement ==
An author's note expresses indebtedness to "my friend Professor E. N. da C. Andrade for the historical and scientific machinery of this story."

== Additional sources ==
- John Clute; Peter Nicholls, eds. (1993). The Encyclopedia of science fiction. Brian Stableford (contributing editor); John Grant (technical editor). New York: St. Martin's Press. p. 743. ISBN 9780312096182.
- Clarke, I. F. (1978). Tale of the future, from the beginning to the present day: an annotated bibliography of those satires, ideal states, imaginary wars and invasions, coming catastrophes and end-of-the-world stories, political warnings and forecasts, inter-planetary voyages and scientific romances—all located in an imaginary future period—that have been published in the United Kingdom between 1644 and 1976 (3rd ed.). London: Library Association. p. 52.
- Clarke, I. F. (1992). Voices prophesying war : future wars, 1763-3749 (2nd ed.). Oxford University Press. p. 237. ISBN 978-0-19-212302-2.
- George Locke (1980). A spectrum of fantasy : the bibliography and biography of a collection of fantastic literature (1st ed.). London: Ferret. p. 145.
- Tuck, Donald H. (1982). The encyclopedia of science fiction and fantasy through 1968: a bibliographic survey of the fields of science fiction, fantasy, and weird fiction through 1968 (1st ed.). Chicago: Advent:Publishers. p. 286.
- Wilkins, John (1684). A discovery of a new world, or, A discourse tending to prove, that 'tis probable there may be another habitable world in the moon : with a discourse concerning the probability of a passage thither : unto which is added, A discourse concerning a new planet, tending to prove, that 'tis probable our Earth is one of the planets : in two parts (The corrected and amended fifth ed.). London: Printed by J. Rawlins for John Gellibrand.
