= A Fall of Moondust =

1961 science-fiction novel by Arthur C. Clarke

- First US edition
- Author: Arthur C. Clarke
- Cover artist: Arthur Hawkins
- Language: English
- Genre: Science fiction
- Publisher: Gollancz (UK); Harcourt, Brace (US)
- Publication date: 1961
- Publication place: United Kingdom
- Media type: Print (Hardback)
- Pages: 224
- ISBN: 0-575-07317-9 (reprint)
- OCLC: 59497789

A Fall of Moondust is a hard science fiction novel by British writer Arthur C. Clarke, first published in 1961. It was nominated for a Hugo Award for Best Novel, and was the first science fiction novel selected to become a Reader's Digest Condensed Book.

== Plot ==
By the 21st century, the Moon has been colonized, and although still very much a research establishment, it is visited by tourists who can afford the trip. One of its attractions is a cruise across one of the lunar seas, named the Sea of Thirst (located within the Sinus Roris) filled with an extremely fine dust, a fine powder far drier than the contents of a terrestrial desert and which almost flows like water, instead of the common regolith which covers most of the lunar surface. A specially designed "boat" named the Selene skims over the surface of the dust in the same manner as a jetski.

But on one cruise, a moonquake causes a cavern to collapse, upsetting the equilibrium. As the dust-cruiser Selene passes over, it sinks about 15 metres below the surface of the dust, hiding the vessel from view, and trapping it beneath the dust. Immediately there are potentially fatal problems for the crew and passengers inside. The sunken Selene has a limited air supply, there is no way for heat generated to escape, communications are impossible, and no one else is sure where Selene has been lost. As the Selene heats up and the air becomes unbreathable, young Captain Pat Harris and his chief stewardess Sue Wilkins try to keep the passengers occupied and psychologically stable while waiting to be rescued. They are helped by a retired space ship captain and explorer, Commodore Hansteen, who is initially traveling incognito.

Chief Engineer (Earthside) Robert Lawrence is sceptical that a rescue can be mounted, even if the Selene can be located. He is ready to abandon an initially unsuccessful search, when he is contacted by Thomas Lawson, a brilliant but eccentric astronomer who, from his vantage point on a satellite high above the Moon, Lagrange II, believes he has detected the remains of a heat trail on the surface. An expedition is organised and Lawrence indeed makes contact with the Selene. However the completely alien environment results in numerous unforeseen complications. The rescue mission decides to sink a tube supplying oxygen to the Selene first, in an effort to buy time to think of a way to get the passengers out. However, this becomes a race against the clock, as the heat in the Selene knocks out the chemical air purification system and the passengers are suffering from CO_{2} poisoning. To preserve air, most passengers enter a chemically induced sleep, with only Pat Harris and physicist Duncan McKenzie staying awake. Just in time, the rescuers manage to drill a hole in the roof and deliver an air supply.

A plan is hatched to save the passengers of the Selene by sinking several concrete caissons to the roof of the ship and cutting a hole. When the first caisson is sunk, disaster strikes again: the liquid waste of the passengers had been expelled out of the ship, turning the dust around it into mud, which causes another, smaller, cave-in. The Selene sinks once more, this time only a small distance, but crucially, at a slope. The caissons cannot be connected to the roof which is now sloping at 30 degrees. The air supply and communications have also been damaged. After restoring these latter two, a new plan is made to sink the caissons, but now the bottom one has a flexible fitting attached to it which can be mounted to the sloping roof of the Selene. The rescue mission works according to plan: the caissons are sunk, the dust is scooped out and the connection is made, but now time is running out again. When the air supply holes were drilled, Selene's double hull was breached and the space in between slowly filled with dust. The metal-rich dust reached the battery packs and short-circuited them. This causes the battery compartment in the stern to burn slowly. The resulting breach is barricaded by the passengers, but dust is still pouring in and there is a fear that the burning material will cause the liquid oxygen supply to explode. Meanwhile, Robert Lawrence is working in the rescue shaft: he sets a small ring charge to make a hole in the roof. Just in time, the hole is made and the passengers escape through the shaft. Captain Harris is the last to leave, up to his waist in dust. Just when he is clear of the shaft, the liquid oxygen explodes, destroying the Selene.

A short epilogue sees Lawrence writing his memoirs, Pat Harris and Sue Wilkins are married. Pat Harris is the captain of the Selene II on its maiden cruise which will also be the last cruise for Harris as he is hoping to transfer to the space service.

== Reception ==
Galaxy reviewer Floyd C. Gale rated A Fall of Moondust five stars out of five, praising it as "emotionally gripping [and] astute" and that "it measures up to the very highest standard of his previous efforts. No praise can be higher".

== Adaptations ==
A BBC Radio drama of the story was produced in 1981. It features David Buck as Captain Pat Harris and Barry Foster as Chief Engineer Lawrence. In 2008, the production was released on BBC Compact Disc (ISBN 978-1-4056-8804-8).

== See also ==
- Space tourism
- Gray Lady Down, 1978 American film about the rescue of a sunken submarine with similar plot elements
- "Midnight", a Doctor Who episode (featuring David Tennant as the Tenth Doctor) with a similar plot

== Sources ==
- Tuck, Donald H. (1974). The Encyclopedia of Science Fiction and Fantasy. Chicago: Advent. p. 101. ISBN 0-911682-20-1.
