= List of fictional astronauts (modern period, works released 1990–1999) =

Lists of fictional astronauts
Early period	Project Mercury	Project Gemini
Project Apollo	1975–1989	1990–1999
2000–2009	2010–2029	Moon
Inner Solar System	Outer Solar System	Other
Far future

The following is a list of fictional astronauts from recent times, mostly using the Space Shuttle, as depicted in works released between 1990 and 1999.

== 1990–1999 ==
Name(s)	Appeared in	Program / Mission / Spacecraft	Fictional date
(1990–1999)
Steven Bishop (CDR); James Dobbins (PLT); Henry "Hank" Henshaw, Dr. Terri Henshaw	DC Comics (1990– )	Space Shuttle; Excalibur	Contemporary
Steven Bishop (CDR); James Dobbins (PLT); Henry "Hank" Henshaw, Dr. Terri Henshaw	Excalibur is blasted by solar flare on reentry, beginning Hank Henshaw's transformation into Cyborg Superman.		
General Yogure	Teenage Mutant Ninja Turtles	Space Shuttle; USA	Early 1990s
General Yogure	Assists the Turtles to prevent Krang and Shredder from heating up the Earth.		
Matt Gosling (CDR); Paul Balchin (PLT); Stella Richards (Payload Manager)	Torus (1990), novel	Space Shuttle; Colorado	Early 2000s
Matt Gosling (CDR); Paul Balchin (PLT); Stella Richards (Payload Manager)	Crew of Space Shuttle on a mission to retrieve derelict satellites from geosynchronous orbit.		
(US) Hes Adams; Heinemann; O'Grady; Marshall; Wilson (First names not provided for the last four US crew) (UK) Michael Dreyfuss, Maj.	Westwind (1990), novel	Space Shuttle; Argos	Contemporary/Near Future
(US) Hes Adams; Heinemann; O'Grady; Marshall; Wilson (First names not provided for the last four US crew) (UK) Michael Dreyfuss, Maj.	Anglo-American crew of a routine shuttle mission that ends disastrously when the shuttle's systems fail on final approach.		
Shuttle-C: Chuck Conard, Maj. Coates, Capt. Byron, Col. Gibbons, Col. Unnamed Marine colonel Nomad: Donald J. Pollock, Col. Chuck Conard, Maj.	Hawkeye (1991), novel	Space Shuttle; Shuttle-C Nomad Spaceplane	Contemporary/Near Future
Shuttle-C: Chuck Conard, Maj. Coates, Capt. Byron, Col. Gibbons, Col. Unnamed Marine colonel Nomad: Donald J. Pollock, Col. Chuck Conard, Maj.	Spy satellites belonging to the major powers are destroyed by an unknown foe. (Note: Daniel Stryker is a pseudonym for authors Chris Morris & Janet Morris.)		
Freedom: Tom Jenkins, Cmdr. (US); Julia Magriffe, MS (Canada); Di Lella, Dr. (Italy); Detrich (Germany); Two unnamed astronauts Edo: Sekigawa, Cmdr. (Japan); Kroeger (MS) (Germany); Unnamed crewman Nomad (1): Jefferson "Sonny" Cleary, Capt. Frank Rowan Nomad (2): Frank Rowan; Gates, Capt. Nomad (3): Jefferson "Sonny" Cleary, Capt. James Henry Mackenzie, Maj.	Cobra (1991), novel	Space Station; Freedom Space Shuttle (Japanese); Edo Nomad Spaceplane	Contemporary/Near Future (Note: Events take place after those of Hawkeye.)
Freedom: Tom Jenkins, Cmdr. (US); Julia Magriffe, MS (Canada); Di Lella, Dr. (Italy); Detrich (Germany); Two unnamed astronauts Edo: Sekigawa, Cmdr. (Japan); Kroeger (MS) (Germany); Unnamed crewman Nomad (1): Jefferson "Sonny" Cleary, Capt. Frank Rowan Nomad (2): Frank Rowan; Gates, Capt. Nomad (3): Jefferson "Sonny" Cleary, Capt. James Henry Mackenzie, Maj.	A multi-national conspiracy threatens Space Station Freedom and its crew in an attempt to gain control of space.		
Bégonhès (Flight Commander) (no first name given); DeMilo (Pilot) (no first name given); Lucie Blanche, Dr. (Biologist); Louis Meyer (Scientist); Molino (Politician) (no first name given)	Nous trois (aka We Three) (1992), novel	Unnamed space agency (France): Space Shuttle	Contemporary (Summer)
Bégonhès (Flight Commander) (no first name given); DeMilo (Pilot) (no first name given); Lucie Blanche, Dr. (Biologist); Louis Meyer (Scientist); Molino (Politician) (no first name given)	French crew on satellite launch-and-repair mission aboard borrowed American orbiter. Launch from Guiana Space Centre.		
Calvin Carlton, Col.	Nurses; Moon over Miami (1992), TV	NASA	Contemporary
Calvin Carlton, Col.	Astronaut who visits Community Medical Center.		
Trikon: Daniel Tighe, Cmdr. Lorraine Renoir, Dr. Freddie Aviles; Lance Muncie; Kurt Jaeckle; Carla Sue Gamble; Russell Cramer; Jeffries; Stanley (first names not given for the last two); Also scientists and technicians from Japan, United Europe and the United States Constellation: N. J. Wiliamson, Cmdr. Williams; Duncan Yeager: Unnamed pilot and co-pilot	The Trikon Deception (1992), novel	Space Station; Trikon Space Shuttle; Constellation Spaceplane; Yeager	Near Future 15 August 1998 – 7 December 1998
Trikon: Daniel Tighe, Cmdr. Lorraine Renoir, Dr. Freddie Aviles; Lance Muncie; Kurt Jaeckle; Carla Sue Gamble; Russell Cramer; Jeffries; Stanley (first names not given for the last two); Also scientists and technicians from Japan, United Europe and the United States Constellation: N. J. Wiliamson, Cmdr. Williams; Duncan Yeager: Unnamed pilot and co-pilot	Personnel who work aboard and support the world's first commercial space-station.		
Natasha "Tasha" Teranova	Wonder Woman (1992), comic books	Russian/Israeli expedition	Contemporary
Natasha "Tasha" Teranova	Cosmonaut rescued by Wonder Woman.		
Youri Souzof, Lt.	Le Cosmonaute oublié (1993), chapter book	Mir 92	Contemporary/Near Future
Youri Souzof, Lt.	After being stranded on space station for a year and a half, cosmonaut receives extraterrestrial visitor.		
Steve Thomas (Pilot)	Dark Universe (1993), film	Kendrick Aerospace Industries: (Note: Also referred to as "Kendrick Aerospace Corporation" and "Kendrick Enterprises".); Nautilus (space shuttle)	Contemporary
Steve Thomas (Pilot)	Astronaut is transformed into monster when alien spores infest spacecraft prior to reentry.		
Freedom: Alex Seerey, Col. John Quanty, Maj. Hugh Lyghtson; Scott Dawkins; Joseph King; Celia Hereson; Lee Wynn; Judith Cianta Lincoln: Two unnamed astronauts (Commander and Co-Pilot)	Ghost Beyond Earth (1993), novel	Space Station; Freedom Space Shuttle; Lincoln	Contemporary/Near Future
Freedom: Alex Seerey, Col. John Quanty, Maj. Hugh Lyghtson; Scott Dawkins; Joseph King; Celia Hereson; Lee Wynn; Judith Cianta Lincoln: Two unnamed astronauts (Commander and Co-Pilot)	Space station crew is attacked by a diabolical entity in orbit. The survivors are rescued by the space shuttle Lincoln.		
Peter Carter (US); Barbara Stockton Urie, Dr. (Canada); Four unnamed astronauts	Minus Time (1993), novel	Space Shuttle; Space station	January 1989
Peter Carter (US); Barbara Stockton Urie, Dr. (Canada); Four unnamed astronauts	Carter and Urie undertake long-duration mission aboard space station. Space Shuttle Victory is mentioned as having exploded.		
Vladimir Rostov, Col.	Tarzan; Tarzan and the Russian Invasion (1993/1994), TV	Soviet Union	Contemporary ("Thursday the 23rd")
Vladimir Rostov, Col.	Cosmonaut lost in jungle for three years is unaware that Cold War has ended.		
Steve Swain, Capt. (USAF); Perry Housman, Col. (USAF)	The Hardy Boys Casefiles; Mission: Mayhem, A Taste for Terror (1994), novels	Space Shuttle	Contemporary
Steve Swain, Capt. (USAF); Perry Housman, Col. (USAF)	Former astronauts instruct Frank and Joe Hardy's team at Space Academy in Huntsville, Alabama. Later, Housman invites the Hardys to explorers' conference in Tunisia.		
Himeko Nayotake (Japan)	Sailor Moon S: The Movie (1994), TV, and Volume 11 "Lover of Princess Kaguya", manga	Space Shuttle; Luna Frontier	Contemporary
Himeko Nayotake (Japan)	Nayotake is selected to travel on an American space expedition just before Princess Kaguya attacks the Earth, although she is oblivious to the Princess's existence and disregards it as a myth.		
Buzz Aldrin; Homer Simpson; Race Banyon	The Simpsons; Deep Space Homer (1994), TV	Space Shuttle; Corvair	Contemporary
Buzz Aldrin; Homer Simpson; Race Banyon	Simpson is drafted as a NASA astronaut for publicity purposes.		
Starcore: Peter Corbeau, Dr. Five unnamed astronauts Eagle One: Five unnamed astronauts	X-Men; The Phoenix Saga - Part I: Sacrifice (1994), TV	Space Shuttle; Starcore Eagle One (space station)	Contemporary
Starcore: Peter Corbeau, Dr. Five unnamed astronauts Eagle One: Five unnamed astronauts	Five of the X-Men — the Beast, Cyclops, Gambit, Jean Grey and Wolverine — replace Starcore's crew to fly to Eagle One, which has been taken over by Erik the Red. Starcore is carrying a "manned close orbital solar probe". Adaptation of the X-Men comics "Dark Phoenix Saga" story arc.		
Oliver; Bob (USMC?) (PLT); Sylvie (no last names given)	The Blue Ball (1995), play	NASA: Apollo; Space Shuttle	Contemporary
Oliver; Bob (USMC?) (PLT); Sylvie (no last names given)	Playwright Paul researches play about astronauts in Houston and Florida and attends Bob's space shuttle launch. Bob has flown in space twice before; Sylvie is a member of the standby crew for Bob's mission. Oliver was one of the original group of astronauts but did not fly in space until later; he walked on the Moon in the Sea of Clouds.		
David Kennedy	High Flight (1995), novel	Space Shuttle	Contemporary
David Kennedy	Former shuttle pilot who now heads a major aeronautics firm.		
Unnamed astronauts Space Shuttle: Emerson; Jensen; Irina (sp.?) (no first names given)	Highlander: The Animated Series; The Survivors from Outer Space (1995), TV	Space Shuttle (Uxus Mission)	Contemporary/Near Future Future (c. 2700)
Unnamed astronauts Space Shuttle: Emerson; Jensen; Irina (sp.?) (no first names given)	Space shuttle returns to Earth after 700 years in space with crew in hibernation. Emerson is an Immortal.		
James Monroe	The Monroes (1995), TV	Space Shuttle	Contemporary
James Monroe	Former astronaut, member of powerful Kennedy-like family.		
Phillips (CDR); O'Brien (PLT); Lambert, Dr. (Mission Specialist); Meyer (Payload Specialist) (No first names given)	My Life as an Afterthought Astronaut (1995), chapter book	Space Shuttle; Encounter Space Station One (International Space Station?)	Contemporary/Near Future
Phillips (CDR); O'Brien (PLT); Lambert, Dr. (Mission Specialist); Meyer (Payload Specialist) (No first names given)	13-year-old Wally McDoogle accidentally stows away aboard shuttle on space station assembly mission. The description of Space Station One seems to imply that it is the ISS.		
Sergei Orlov, Gen.	Op Center: Mirror Image (1995), novel	Soyuz	Contemporary
Sergei Orlov, Gen.	Veteran cosmonaut (one of whose missions seems to have been based on Soyuz 33), assigned to command Russia's new Combined Operations Center located beneath the Hermitage Museum.		
Mark Fortunato; Unnamed astronauts	The Plant That Ate Dirty Socks Goes Up In Space (1995), chapter book	Space Shuttle; Spacelab	Contemporary
Mark Fortunato; Unnamed astronauts	Animate plant flies aboard shuttle on Spacelab mission.		
Atlantis: Rick Spencer; Pierre Renaud (Canada) (Payload Specialist); Three unnamed astronauts Discovery: Tessa "Tess" McClain; Yoshiko Sugano (Japan) (Payload Specialist); Four unnamed astronauts Apollo: Rick Spencer (CDR); Yoshiko Sugano (CMP); Tessa McClain (LMP)	Abandon in Place (1996), novella	Space Shuttle; Atlantis Discovery; Spacelab Apollo; The Spirit of Hope (CSM)/Faith (LM)	Near Future (2000s)
Atlantis: Rick Spencer; Pierre Renaud (Canada) (Payload Specialist); Three unnamed astronauts Discovery: Tessa "Tess" McClain; Yoshiko Sugano (Japan) (Payload Specialist); Four unnamed astronauts Apollo: Rick Spencer (CDR); Yoshiko Sugano (CMP); Tessa McClain (LMP)	Shortly after Neil Armstrong's death, ghostly Saturn Vs begin launching from Kennedy Space Center. Faith lands at edge of Aitken Basin. Expanded into novel in 2000.		
Henry J. "Bull" Eckert, Col. (Chief of the Astronaut Office); Ezekiel "Zeke" Beaumont, Capt. Barbara DeSantos, Lt. Cmdr. Jack Riles, Maj. Tamara St. James (Mission Specialist); Reginald Warren, Maj.	The Cape (1996–7), TV	Space Shuttle	Contemporary
Henry J. "Bull" Eckert, Col. (Chief of the Astronaut Office); Ezekiel "Zeke" Beaumont, Capt. Barbara DeSantos, Lt. Cmdr. Jack Riles, Maj. Tamara St. James (Mission Specialist); Reginald Warren, Maj.	NASA career astronauts.		
Monte Beaman (CDR); Victor Lutz (PLT); Shannon Thorpe (Mission Specialist); RoxeAnn Karch (Payload Specialist); Tod Cochran (Payload Specialist); Elliot Andrew Schroeder (Junior Astronaut/Payload Specialist)	Countdown (1996), novel	Space Shuttle; Endeavour (STS-97)	Contemporary/Near Future
Monte Beaman (CDR); Victor Lutz (PLT); Shannon Thorpe (Mission Specialist); RoxeAnn Karch (Payload Specialist); Tod Cochran (Payload Specialist); Elliot Andrew Schroeder (Junior Astronaut/Payload Specialist)	14-year-old Elliot Schroeder flies aboard Endeavour on Mission to Planet Earth flight as NASA's first Junior Astronaut.		
Aquarius II mission: Nicholas T. Saxon, Capt. (USAF) "Murph" Murphy; Thompson; Unnamed personnel Aquarius VII: Joseph Shay, Cmdr. Bill Powell; Rice; Zimmerman; Jackson; Deborah Saxon	Dark Breed (1996), film	Aquarius II (space station) Space Shuttle; Aquarius VII (Omega Forces mission)	Contemporary
Aquarius II mission: Nicholas T. Saxon, Capt. (USAF) "Murph" Murphy; Thompson; Unnamed personnel Aquarius VII: Joseph Shay, Cmdr. Bill Powell; Rice; Zimmerman; Jackson; Deborah Saxon	Aquarius VII astronauts return from secret military mission infested by parasitic aliens. Nick Saxon was the first Aquarius mission commander and led disastrous special forces mission to secret Aquarius II space station four years earlier.		
Endeavour: Lori Kirsten (CDR); Henry Janesh (PLT); Chris Terence, Dr. (Mission Specialist #1); Dirk Rodriguez (Mission Specialist #2); Sharon Goldman (Mission Specialist); Harold Spearman (Mission Specialist); J. T. Murphy (Mission Specialist) Apollo II: Lori Kirsten (Pilot); Chris Terence International Space Station: Tatiana Haldin (Russia) (Commander); Peter Mikhailovich Denisov (Russia) (Engineer); François Raymond (France) (Mission Specialist); Jiro Kawaguchi (Japan) (Mission Specialist)	Encounter with Tiber (1996), novel	Space Shuttle; Endeavour Apollo II; International Space Station	2002 2006
Endeavour: Lori Kirsten (CDR); Henry Janesh (PLT); Chris Terence, Dr. (Mission Specialist #1); Dirk Rodriguez (Mission Specialist #2); Sharon Goldman (Mission Specialist); Harold Spearman (Mission Specialist); J. T. Murphy (Mission Specialist) Apollo II: Lori Kirsten (Pilot); Chris Terence International Space Station: Tatiana Haldin (Russia) (Commander); Peter Mikhailovich Denisov (Russia) (Engineer); François Raymond (France) (Mission Specialist); Jiro Kawaguchi (Japan) (Mission Specialist)	Shuttle carrying Habitation Module to the ISS experiences engine failure and crashes in Atlantic Ocean. Four years later, Kirsten and Terence arrive on ISS as Earth receives alien signal from Alpha Centauri. (Note: Apollo II was launched on an Atlas 2AS booster rocket.)		
Adam Freis, Col. Atlantis: NASA, Marc Franklin, Dr. (CDR); Vic Green, Lt. Col. (PLT); Arlan Burns, Maj. Frank Purvis; FKA, Alexandra Koslovsky (MS); Orlov; Nichi (First names not given for the last two crew members)	Ignition (1996), novel	Space Shuttle; Atlantis	Contemporary
Adam Freis, Col. Atlantis: NASA, Marc Franklin, Dr. (CDR); Vic Green, Lt. Col. (PLT); Arlan Burns, Maj. Frank Purvis; FKA, Alexandra Koslovsky (MS); Orlov; Nichi (First names not given for the last two crew members)	As the Space Shuttle Atlantis prepares to lift off on a resupply mission to Mir, extortionists take over Cape Kennedy and threaten to blow up the shuttle and its crew on the launch pad unless a ransom is paid.		
Atkins, Lt. Cmdr. (USN) Recovery One: Russell, Maj. (CDR); Mark Lowrey, Lt. Cmdr. (USN) (PLT); Mission Specialists 1 and 2 (unnamed)	JAG; Recovery (1996), TV	Space Shuttle; Atlantis (Recovery One)	1996
Atkins, Lt. Cmdr. (USN) Recovery One: Russell, Maj. (CDR); Mark Lowrey, Lt. Cmdr. (USN) (PLT); Mission Specialists 1 and 2 (unnamed)	Atkins is killed while training as pilot of shuttle mission to be launched from Vandenberg AFB. JAG investigators Harmon Rabb and Meg Austin try to determine who is responsible so that the shuttle can launch to place a spy satellite in its proper orbit.		
Dimitri; Igor (no last names given)	Majorettes in Space (Des majorettes dans l'espace) (1996), short film	Soyuz 27	Contemporary
Dimitri; Igor (no last names given)	Cosmonauts in space without condoms.		
John Randall Griswold; Robert Merchan	The Mystery Files of Shelby Woo; The Missing Astronaut (1996), TV	NASA: Alpha 7 Space Shuttle: Universe 3 Encounter	Contemporary
John Randall Griswold; Robert Merchan	Griswold is kidnapped from party at Mike Woo's bed and breakfast in Cocoa Beach, Florida; Shelby Woo investigates. Merchan is in charge of scientific research for NASA; he was scrubbed from Alpha 7 mission due to head cold and replaced by Griswold.		
John Russell, Maj. Soyuz: S. R. Hadden	Contact (1997), film	Soyuz	Contemporary
John Russell, Maj. Soyuz: S. R. Hadden	Billionaire industrialist Hadden's privately financed spaceflight to Mir. Russell is a former astronaut who drops out of consideration as the passenger for the Machine built from alien blueprints.		
NASA: Dermott "Dusty" Hooper (Note: Also known as "Hoop".); Martin Bruce, Col. (USAF/CIA?); Tim Garvey (Chief Astronaut); E. "Butch" Grieve; Conner; Hendricks; Malley; Mark Wembley (Mathematician); Hannah Scott (Mathematician); Ken Boothe; Mike Farina (CAPCOM, STS-74); Roy Honeycutt (CAPCOM, STS-74); Mitch Dalke (CAPCOM, STS-74A); Jules Carreau (CAPCOM, STS-74A); Jim Eisenbach (CAPCOM, STS-74A); Rob Lynam (CAPCOM, STS-74A) STS-1: Santiago "Santy" Santich, Capt. (USN) (CDR); Joe Forrester (PLT) STS-74: Steven Banke, Col. (USAF) (CDR); Robert Halvorson (PLT); Samuel James Torrington, Capt. (US Army) (Mission Specialist); Alexis Leonidovich "Alex" Orlov, Dr. (Note: Patronymic not given; deduced from father's name.) (Mission Specialist); Habuda (no first name given) STS-74A: Santiago "Santy" Santich (CDR); Melanie Anderson, Lt. Cmdr. (USN) (PLT); Alexis Leonidovich "Alex" Orlov, Dr. (Mission Specialist One/Flight Engineer); Alexandra "Alex Prime" O'Day, Dr. (Mission Specialist Two)	Final Orbit (1997), novel	NASA; Space Shuttle: STS-1 (Columbia) STS-74 (Atlantis); STS-74A (Columbia)	April 12, 1981 1997 (April – May)
Torrington is killed in apparent EVA accident on mission to repair Gamma Ray Observatory, triggering NASA cover-up; Santich commands follow-up mission to complete repair. Santich, known as "the Dean of American Astronauts", was a member of NASA Astronaut Group 2. He flew twice on Gemini, once on Apollo and three times on the space shuttle prior to STS-74A and is a former Chief Astronaut. He was the ninth man on the Moon, landing in the Descartes Mountains (presumably on Apollo 16). Hooper, also a member of Group 2, was grounded due to middle-ear problem. Grieve is a three-time shuttle veteran. Torrington flew one shuttle mission prior to STS-74.
John Churchill Cooper, Ph.D. (Mission Specialist)	Heatcrazed! (1997), novel	Space Shuttle; Columbia	Contemporary (August)
John Churchill Cooper, Ph.D. (Mission Specialist)	Former NASA astronaut who flew on three shuttle missions finds romance in Louisiana bayou.		
Jiang Ling, Lt.	Titan (1997), novel	Shenzhou	Contemporary
Jiang Ling, Lt.	First Chinese human spaceflight, Lei Feng 1, is launched in late 2004. The solo astronaut is a young female PLAAF officer. The craft and flight profile are remarkably similar to the Shenzhou missions flown several years after the novel was published.		
Abel "Ab" (USAF) (no last name given)	The Astronaut's Tale (1998), opera	Space Shuttle	November 1954 – Contemporary
Abel "Ab" (USAF) (no last name given)	Astronaut who dies in space shuttle explosion.		
David (CDR); Barbie [Barbara Millicent Roberts] (PLT); Dan (Mission Specialist); Robin (Mission Specialist); Kira (Mission Specialist) (no last names given)	Barbie: Shooting for the Stars (1998), chapter book	Space Shuttle	Contemporary
David (CDR); Barbie [Barbara Millicent Roberts] (PLT); Dan (Mission Specialist); Robin (Mission Specialist); Kira (Mission Specialist) (no last names given)	Mission to repair Mitchell Telescope (apparently similar to Hubble Space Telescope). Cf. Astronauts in other media.		
Pete Miller, Cmdr. Jeremy Sanchez (PLT); Dave Cameron, Payload Specialist (PS); Dennis Franks, Mission Specialist (MS)	Bright Star (1998), novel	Space Shuttle; Atlantis	Contemporary
Pete Miller, Cmdr. Jeremy Sanchez (PLT); Dave Cameron, Payload Specialist (PS); Dennis Franks, Mission Specialist (MS)	Astronauts on a mission to launch a prototype SDI weapon.		
Jim McCan (CDR); Harry Sempler (PLT)	Diamondbacks (aka Space Shuttle War: Mission Death) (1998), film	Space Shuttle (Note: Referred to both as Atlantis and as Explorer.)	Contemporary
Jim McCan (CDR); Harry Sempler (PLT)	NASA astronauts imperiled by militia takeover of tracking station.		
Unnamed cosmonaut	Ich Dreh Mich Um Dich (1998), music video	Soyuz; Mir	Contemporary
Unnamed cosmonaut	Washed-up cosmonaut who flew to Mir.		
NASA: Chad Connors; Rick Delahunt (USN) (CDR, STS-97); Clint Hurley (Acting Chief Astronaut); Melinda Pruett; Jerome "Jerry" Rager, Lt. Col. (US Army); Arnaldo Rivera (CAPCOM); Jinx Seamans (Deputy Chief of Astronaut Office); Sarah Wall STS-76: Jackson Willet (CDR); Joseph Buerhle, Col. (USAF) (PLT) (also CDR, STS-90, Discovery); Kelly Gessner (Mission Specialist) (also MS, STS-93); Christy Nasvik; Carlos Rivera STS-95: Ronald Kubiak, Capt. (USN) (CDR); Sandra Rhodes, Maj. (USAF) (PLT); Dolores McCoy (Mission Specialist); Brian Monteleone, Cmdr. (USN) (Mission Specialist); Norman Sakmar, Col. (USAF) (Mission Specialist) STS-96: Joseph (CDR); Mecom (PLT); Teague (Mission Specialist 1); Holly (Mission Specialist 2); Whitefield (Mission Specialist 3) (no first names given) 1998 NASA Astronaut Group, "The Worms": Jeffrey Betts, Cmdr. (USN); Jason Borders, Lt. Cmdr. (USN); Anton Craig, Maj. (USAF); Karl Dennet, Capt. (USAF); Gunter Diemer; John Essington; Vardon Hall; Diana Herron, Capt. (USAF); Melanie Juin (ESA); Viktor Kondratko, Lt. Col. (Russian Air Force/RSA); Mark Koskinen; Thomas Moad, Cmdr. (USN); Ray Murdaugh, Capt. (USMC); Miguel Raquena; Daniel Raybourne, Maj. (USAF); Geraldine Reed; Donald Schuetz, Lt. Cmdr. (USN); Wayne Shelton; Gregory Yakubik, Capt. (US Army) (CAPCOM, STS-100) STS-100: Steven Goslin, Lt. Col. (USMC) (CDR) (also PLT, STS-79 and STS-90); Jeffrey Dieckhaus, Cmdr. (USN) (PLT) (also STS-92); David Freeh, Ph.D., Maj. (USAF) (Mission Specialist); Kelly Gessner (Mission Specialist); Donal "Don" O'Riordan (ESA) (Mission Specialist); Mark Koskinen (Mission Specialist 4); Viktor Kondratko (Mission Specialist 5) Russian Space Agency: Mir-29: Nikolai Dolgov (Commander); Nikolai Kazantsev (Flight Engineer); Gary McMinn (NASA) (returns on STS-95) Soyuz TM-28/Mir-30: Alexander Alexeyevich "Sasha-1" Shabarov, Lt. Col. (Russian Air Force) (Commander); Alexander V. "Sasha-2" Dergunov (Flight Engineer); Calvin Stipe, Ph.D. (NASA) Mir-31: Yuri Petrenko (Commander); Vladimir "Volodya" Belokonev (Flight Engineer); Cal Stipe	Missing Man (1998), novel	NASA Space Shuttle: STS-95 (Atlantis); STS-96 (Columbia); STS-100 (Atlantis) Russian Space Agency Mir: Mir-29; Soyuz TM-28/Mir-30; Mir-31	October 14, 1998 – October 1999
After surviving T-38 crash that kills Chief Astronaut Buerhle, a four-time Shuttle veteran, ASCAN Koskinen must fight to save his career. Stipe is only astronaut to have flown aboard all five Shuttles.
Alex Streck, Capt. (CDR); Spencer J. "Spence" Armacost, Cmdr. Shelly Carter; Pat Elliott; Tom Sullivan; Stan (Mission Specialist) (no last name given)	The Astronaut's Wife (1999), film/novel	Space Shuttle; Victory	Contemporary
Alex Streck, Capt. (CDR); Spencer J. "Spence" Armacost, Cmdr. Shelly Carter; Pat Elliott; Tom Sullivan; Stan (Mission Specialist) (no last name given)	NASA astronauts narrowly escape death after an explosion during an EVA. Streck dies from a massive stroke shortly after returning to earth. Armacost seems to be in good health, but he suffers a mysterious and sinister personality change after the mission.		
Oleg; Casimir, Dr. (no last names given)	The cosmonaut's last message to the woman he once loved in the former Soviet Union (1999), play	Soviet Union: Harmony 114 (Special Orbital Craft)	"Recently" (Summer)
Oleg; Casimir, Dr. (no last names given)	Cosmonauts on secret mission to explore human limits, forgotten in orbit for twelve years after fall of USSR.		
John Crichton	Farscape (1999–2004), TV	Space Shuttle; Collaroy Farscape One	Contemporary/Near Future
John Crichton	International Aeronautics and Space Administration (IASA) astronaut lost in space. His father was former astronaut Jack Crichton.		
Gordon "Gordie" (Note: Also known as "the Sphinx".) Obie (Director of Flight Crew Operations); Hank Millar (Chief of the Astronaut Office); Jack McCallum, M.D. STS-160: Vance (CDR); DeWitt (PLT); Emma Watson, M.D. (Mission Specialist) (originally assigned to STS-162); Chenoweth; Three unnamed astronauts International Space Station: Michael Griggs (Commander); Nicolai Rudenko (Russia); Luther Ames (NASA); Diana Estes, Dr. (UK) (ESA); William Haning, Dr. (NASA); Kenichi Hirai (NASDA); Emma Watson, M.D. (relieves Haning) STS-161 (crew originally assigned to STS-162): Bob Kittredge (USN) (CDR); Jill Hewitt (USN) (PLT); Andy Mercer (Mission Specialist); O'Leary (Medical Officer) Apogee II: Sullivan "Sully" Obie	Gravity (1999), novel	NASA Space Shuttle: STS-160 (Atlantis); STS-161 (Discovery); STS-162 (Endeavour) International Space Station; Soyuz; Crew Return Vehicle Apogee Engineering: Apogee II (Single-stage-to-orbit)	Near Future (July 7 – August 27, January)
Mysterious contagion spreads aboard ISS. Watson previously flew on Atlantis on STS-141; Estes flew on Atlantis on a transoceanic abort flight. Ames flew on Columbia as a mission specialist. Kittredge is a three-time Shuttle veteran; Gordon Obie was a two-time Shuttle commander. McCallum was removed from crew of STS-145 due to a kidney stone.
Jack Austin	Heat Vision and Jack; The Eyes of Paragon (1999), TV	NASA	Contemporary
Jack Austin	Unsold sitcom pilot about astronaut whose orbit took him too close to the Sun; he gains superintelligence in daylight from solar energy. He is pursued by Ron Silver, also a former astronaut as well as an actor.		
Tesla: Yuri Puskin (Russia) (Commander); Rene (France) (Co-Captain) (no last name given) Shuttle: Konrad (USA) (Astrophysicist/Pilot); Max "Mad Max" (USA) (Guest Cosmonaut) (no last names given)	In the Dead of Space (a.k.a. Space Fury) (1999), film	Russian Space Agency: Space Station; Tesla Reserve shuttle	Near Future
Tesla: Yuri Puskin (Russia) (Commander); Rene (France) (Co-Captain) (no last name given) Shuttle: Konrad (USA) (Astrophysicist/Pilot); Max "Mad Max" (USA) (Guest Cosmonaut) (no last names given)	American astrophysicist Konrad and pro golfer Max join crew of space station, but one of the four people aboard is a murderer.		
Rescue Heroes Space Station: Warren Waters (Commander); Roger Houston; Four unnamed astronauts Rescue Heroes: Billy Blazes; Wendy Waters; Ariel Flyer European Space Station: Wellington, Maj. Unnamed lieutenant Space shuttle: Two unnamed astronauts	Rescue Heroes; Tidal Wave, Meteor (1999), Houston, We Have a Problem (2001), TV Rescue Heroes; Why We Became Rescue Heroes: The Teammates Tell Their Exciting Stories (2002), picture book	Rescue Heroes Space Station (a.k.a. Space Command Center, Hexagon); European Space Station; Space shuttle	Contemporary/Near Future
Rescue Heroes Space Station: Warren Waters (Commander); Roger Houston; Four unnamed astronauts Rescue Heroes: Billy Blazes; Wendy Waters; Ariel Flyer European Space Station: Wellington, Maj. Unnamed lieutenant Space shuttle: Two unnamed astronauts	Interdisciplinary team of rescue specialists assists during meteor showers.		
Annie Caulfield (Chief of Astronauts) Orion: Jim Rowland, Col. (CDR); Lee Everett (PLT); Gail Scott (Payload Specialist); Sharon Ling (Mission Specialist); Three unnamed astronauts	Shadow Watch (1999), novel	Space Shuttle; Orion	April 15 – 30, 2001
Annie Caulfield (Chief of Astronauts) Orion: Jim Rowland, Col. (CDR); Lee Everett (PLT); Gail Scott (Payload Specialist); Sharon Ling (Mission Specialist); Three unnamed astronauts	Crew of Space Shuttle Orion. Col. Rowland is killed when sabotage causes the shuttle to catch fire on the launch pad. Caulfield and Rowland were both members of the astronaut class of 1994 and flew together on previous missions.		
Shannon O'Donnel Janeway; McMillan, Lt. (no first name given)	Star Trek: Voyager; 11:59 (1999), TV	N/A	December 27 – 31, 2000
Shannon O'Donnel Janeway; McMillan, Lt. (no first name given)	Former astronaut trainee O'Donnel becomes ancestor of Kathryn Janeway. McMillan is scheduled for four-month space station mission in 2003.		
