= List of fictional astronauts (beyond near-future capabilities) =

Lists of fictional astronauts
| Early period | Project Mercury | Project Gemini |
| Project Apollo | 1975–1989 | 1990–1999 |
| 2000–2009 | 2010–2029 | Moon |
| Inner Solar System | Outer Solar System | Other |
Far future

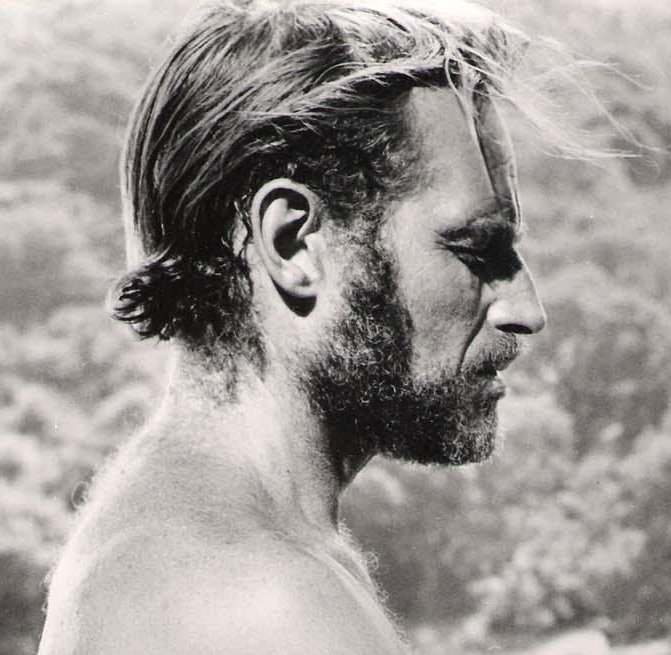
Actor Charlton Heston as Col. George Taylor, Planet of the Apes (1968 film)

The following is a list of fictional astronauts performing or attempting feats beyond the capabilities of the present or near future, such as interstellar travel.

== Far future ==
| Name(s) | Appeared in | Program / mission / spacecraft | Fictional date |
|---|---|---|---|
| Alexei Pavlovich Zarubin, Capt. (Commander); Nikolai (Engineer); Nina (Engineer); Georgi (Navigator); Lena (Physician); Sergei (Astrophysicist) (no last names given for last five) | "The Astronaut" (1960), short story | Polus | Future (late 20th or early 21st century) |
| Alexei Pavlovich Zarubin, Capt. (Commander); Nikolai (Engineer); Nina (Engineer); Georgi (Navigator); Lena (Physician); Sergei (Astrophysicist) (no last names given for last five) | On the first expedition to Barnard's Star, Zarubin sacrifices himself to save his crew. Zarubin and Sergei previously landed together on Saturn's moon Dione. | | |
| Gresham (no first name given); Unnamed astronaut | The Twilight Zone; The Invaders (1961), TV | United States Air Force; Space Probe No. 1 | Future |
| Gresham (no first name given); Unnamed astronaut | USAF astronauts discover life on alien planet. | | |
| Reed Richards; Susan Storm; Jonathan Storm; Benjamin Jacob Grimm | Fantastic Four (1961–present), comic | Experimental interstellar spacecraft (Note: According to The Fantastic Four #2, Richards' crew was trying to reach Mars.) | Contemporary |
| Reed Richards; Susan Storm; Jonathan Storm; Benjamin Jacob Grimm | Private space venture; astronauts bizarrely affected by cosmic rays. | | |
| Steve Zodiac, Col. Matthew Matic, Prof., Venus | Fireball XL5 (1962), TV | Fireball XL5 | 2062 |
| Steve Zodiac, Col. Matthew Matic, Prof., Venus | Commander of the Fireball XL5 of the World Space Patrol. | | |
| Max Landin, Cmdr. (Conn watch); Edward Haverson (Watch officer); William Berger (Watch medic); Three unnamed crewmembers | "The Samaritan" (1963), short story | Unknown (Interstellar vessel) | Future |
| Max Landin, Cmdr. (Conn watch); Edward Haverson (Watch officer); William Berger (Watch medic); Three unnamed crewmembers | Crew of humanity's first interstellar vessel encounters aliens in distress. Landin was a member of one of the first crews to orbit the Earth. | | |
| Larry Dart, Capt. Slim, Husky | Space Patrol (1963), TV | Space Patrol | 2100 |
| Larry Dart, Capt. Slim, Husky | Commander of Galasphere 347 of the Space Patrol. | | |
| Paul Ross, Capt. Theodore Mason, Lt. Michael Carter, Lt. | "Death Ship" (1953), short story Twilight Zone; Death Ship (1963), TV | Rocket Bureau: E-89 | 1997 |
| Paul Ross, Capt. Theodore Mason, Lt. Michael Carter, Lt. | Spacecraft crew crashes on distant planet; they have difficulty accepting their own deaths. | | |
| Unnamed cosmonaut | "El cosmonauta" (aka "The Cosmonaut") (1964), short story | Unknown | Future |
| Unnamed cosmonaut | Cosmonaut has fatal encounter with intelligent beings on alien planet. | | |
| Douglas Stansfield, Cmdr. | Twilight Zone; The Long Morrow (1964), TV | Unknown | 1987 – 2027 |
| Douglas Stansfield, Cmdr. | Astronaut placed in suspended animation for forty-year mission. | | |
| Faith One: Unnamed astronauts Hope One: Hank Stevens, Col. (Commander); John Andros, Dr. Paul Martin, Dr. (Scientist); Lisa Wayne, Dr. (Scientist) | Space Probe Taurus (a.k.a. Space Monster) (1965), film | United States; Space Agency (Earth Control): Faith One; Hope One (US Rocket Ship 970); Space Platform | 2000 |
| Faith One: Unnamed astronauts Hope One: Hank Stevens, Col. (Commander); John Andros, Dr. Paul Martin, Dr. (Scientist); Lisa Wayne, Dr. (Scientist) | Hope One astronauts on mission to planet Taurus in Triangulum Galaxy. | | |
| Zefram Cochrane | Star Trek: The Original Series; Metamorphosis (1967), TV Star Trek: First Contact (1996), film | Phoenix | 2063 |
| Zefram Cochrane | First use of warp drive by an Earth vessel in the Star Trek timeline. | | |
| George Taylor, Col. Dodge; Landon; Stewart | Planet of the Apes (1968), film | Icarus | 1972 |
| George Taylor, Col. Dodge; Landon; Stewart | ANSA astronauts on an interstellar mission, perhaps to Bellatrix. | | |
| Robert O'Bannion (pilot astronaut); Andrei Voronov; Carlos Pascual; May Connearney; Sidney Lee; Doris McNerty; Aaron Hatfield; Jerry Grote; Chen Shu Li; Alicia Montiverdi; Lou D'Orazio; Marlene Ettinger (scientist); Other unnamed astronauts | As on a Darkling Plain (1972), novel | Unknown | Future |
| Robert O'Bannion (pilot astronaut); Andrei Voronov; Carlos Pascual; May Connearney; Sidney Lee; Doris McNerty; Aaron Hatfield; Jerry Grote; Chen Shu Li; Alicia Montiverdi; Lou D'Orazio; Marlene Ettinger (scientist); Other unnamed astronauts | Astronauts on missions to Jupiter and Sirius; Lee previously visited Titan. | | |
| Prometheus-1, Prometheus-3: Bud Williams, Jr. Prometheus-5: Stony Stevenson, Pvt./Cpl. (Hon.) (US Army) | Between Time and Timbuktu (1972), TV movie | Mission Control: Prometheus-5 (Gemini-like) | Near Future (March – December) |
| Prometheus-1, Prometheus-3: Bud Williams, Jr. Prometheus-5: Stony Stevenson, Pvt./Cpl. (Hon.) (US Army) | Jingle contest winner Stevenson is launched into space and through time warp. Former astronaut Williams flew to Mars on one of the earlier Prometheus missions. | | |
| Fredric Michael Kelly; Steen (no first name given); Unnamed astronauts | "Kelly, Fredric Michael" (aka "Kelly, Fredric Michael: 1928-1987", "Kelly, Fredric Michael (1928-1990)") (1973), short story | Unknown | c. 1987 |
| Fredric Michael Kelly; Steen (no first name given); Unnamed astronauts | Astronauts on early mission using "warps" to reach another galaxy have their minds drained by alien force. | | |
| Tom Trimble | Unidentified Flying Oddball (a.k.a. The Spaceman and King Arthur, King Arthur and the Astronaut, A Spaceman in King Arthur's Court) (1979), film | NASA: Stardust 1 | Contemporary/Near Future |
| Tom Trimble | NASA technician Trimble is accidentally launched aboard faster-than-light spacecraft and travels back in time to Arthurian era. | | |
| Ed Westin, Col./Gen. O'Keefe, Capt. (no first name given) Solo 1/Solo 2: Mark Devore, Capt. | Time Warp (1981), film | NASA: Solo 1 Solo 2 | 1984 – July 13, 1985 / July 13, 1986 |
| Ed Westin, Col./Gen. O'Keefe, Capt. (no first name given) Solo 1/Solo 2: Mark Devore, Capt. | While returning from a one-year mission to "the farthest reach of the galaxy", Solo 1 passes through a time warp, sending Devore one year into the future. | | |
| NASA: Donald Hotchkiss, Capt. (Prof.); Mary Washburn Moon mission: "Hoop" Hooper Mars mission: Amanda Jaworski (USAF) (Commander); Sue Ann O'Riley (Copilot) Soviet Union: Solipsovich; Zayatin Zamayt | The Eleven Million Mile High Dancer (1985), novel | NASA: Moon mission Mars mission | 1986 |
| NASA: Donald Hotchkiss, Capt. (Prof.); Mary Washburn Moon mission: "Hoop" Hooper Mars mission: Amanda Jaworski (USAF) (Commander); Sue Ann O'Riley (Copilot) Soviet Union: Solipsovich; Zayatin Zamayt | Mars-bound astronaut Jaworski is caught up in a series of bizarre events, leading her to travel to Epsilon Erdani (sic) in search of her lost cat. | | |
| Bartholomew Mann (Physicist); Terry Waters, Maj. Paul St John, Dr. Philip Quincy-Jones; Luciano Cragnolini; Unnamed commander | The Quiet Place (1987), novel | Unknown | Near Future |
| Bartholomew Mann (Physicist); Terry Waters, Maj. Paul St John, Dr. Philip Quincy-Jones; Luciano Cragnolini; Unnamed commander | First crewed interstellar spacecraft returns to find the Earth changed beyond recognition. | | |
| Volopas: Miroslav Gurov (Team leader); Dennis Averianov; Sasha Lapushkin Shuttlecraft: Antonov; Elissa | "A Birch Tree, A White Fox" (1989), short story | Space Survey Corps: Volopas Geological Institute: Nevski; Shuttlecraft | Future |
| Volopas: Miroslav Gurov (Team leader); Dennis Averianov; Sasha Lapushkin Shuttlecraft: Antonov; Elissa | Cosmonauts crash-land on distant planet where speaking aloud means death. | | |
| Stephen G. Richey (Col.), Commander; Unnamed crewmembers | Star Trek: The Next Generation; The Royale (1989), TV | NASA: Charybdis | July 23, 2037 – 2044 |
| Stephen G. Richey (Col.), Commander; Unnamed crewmembers | Third crewed expedition outside Solar System results in Richey dying in captivity on alien planet. | | |
| Floyd G. Nevish (Commander) | Cosmic Wormholes: The Search for Interstellar Shortcuts (1992), non-fiction book | Jovian Industries | Future |
| Floyd G. Nevish (Commander) | Astronaut on mission into Kerr-type rotating black hole. | | |
| Commander; Scientist/First Mate; Space Twin 1 Space Twin 2 | The Voyage (1992), opera | Space station Spacecraft | 2092 "Several years later" |
| Commander; Scientist/First Mate; Space Twin 1 Space Twin 2 | Archeologists discover "directional crystals" brought to Earth by ancient astronauts, causing instruments on a space station crewed by Space Twins 1 and 2 to pinpoint the aliens' origin. Several years later, Space Twins 1 and 2 join crew of generational voyage to aliens' planet. | | |
| Bud, Cmdr. (USN) (no last name given) | Dark Dreams; Dreamer (1993), anthology film segment | Space Shuttle | Unknown |
| Bud, Cmdr. (USN) (no last name given) | Astronaut who experiences strange dreams on mission to habitable extrasolar planet using suspended animation. | | |
| Olshavsky (Captain) (no first name given); Clio Trigorin (Historian); Sanetomo Kawamura (Astronomer); 27 unnamed crewmembers | Encounter with Tiber (1996), novel | Tenacity | July 20, 2069 – 2081 |
| Olshavsky (Captain) (no first name given); Clio Trigorin (Historian); Sanetomo Kawamura (Astronomer); 27 unnamed crewmembers | Humanity's first starship, built with alien technology, on a voyage to Alpha Centauri. | | |
| Adventurer: Badquor, Capt. (Sc.D.); John (Astronomer); Lissa (Atmospheric chemist); Odis; Tagore (Theorist); Unnamed geologist Unnamed crewmembers Second expedition: Unnamed crew | "A Dance to Strange Musics" (a.k.a. "A Pit Which Has No Bottom") (1998), short story | Adventurer Second expedition (unnamed starship) | Future (21st century?) (Note: Story takes place "more than a century into the dual evolution of society and computers" on Earth.) |
| Adventurer: Badquor, Capt. (Sc.D.); John (Astronomer); Lissa (Atmospheric chemist); Odis; Tagore (Theorist); Unnamed geologist Unnamed crewmembers Second expedition: Unnamed crew | Adventurer, the first crewed starship, makes bizarre discoveries on planet in Alpha Centauri system. A second expedition investigates some years later. | | |
| Henry Forbes Unnamed co-pilot of Congreve (UK) Unnamed Discovery crew members | "The Wire Continuum" (1998), short story | Mustard (Multi-Unit Space Transport and Recovery Device); Congreve Endeavour Discovery | 1947 – 2017 (Alternate History) |
| Henry Forbes Unnamed co-pilot of Congreve (UK) Unnamed Discovery crew members | RAF World War II veteran and rocket pioneer in alternate history in which teleportation was developed in the 1950s. Forbes makes first crewed landing on Moon in Oceanus Procellarum with Buzz Aldrin and Alexei Leonov in 1977, leaves solar system aboard first starship Discovery in 1997. | | |
| John Cope; Five unnamed astronauts | Cold Fusion (1999), novel | Argos Program; Argos 2 | Near Future |
| John Cope; Five unnamed astronauts | First crewed expedition to another solar system. | | |
| Clark Kent, Lt. | JLA: Earth 2 (2000), graphic novel | Unknown | Contemporary (Antimatter universe) |
| Clark Kent, Lt. | Alternate universe equivalent of Superman was originally astronaut injured in hyperspace accident. | | |
| James Dreeden, Maj. (Commander); Callie Whitehorse Landau (Mission Specialist/Astrophysicist); Alec Landau, MD (Mission Specialist/Physician); Louisa Kennedy, Dr. (Astrogation expert) | The Outer Limits; In the Blood (2001), TV | USAS: Copernicus | Future (Note: Earth's population is "fifteen billion people".) |
| James Dreeden, Maj. (Commander); Callie Whitehorse Landau (Mission Specialist/Astrophysicist); Alec Landau, MD (Mission Specialist/Physician); Louisa Kennedy, Dr. (Astrogation expert) | Crew travels into alternate universe through newly discovered rip in space-time. | | |
| Franz Daxenberger, Dr. Dirk Mandelbrot, Dr. Dr. [sic] | Space Zoo (2001), short film | ESA (Bavaria): Stoiber (Research station) | 2030 |
| Franz Daxenberger, Dr. Dirk Mandelbrot, Dr. Dr. [sic] | Astronauts on space station in Earth orbit travel to Aldebaran 5 due to use of hyperspace module. | | |
| Sam Yeager; Jonathan Yeager; Karen Yeager; Glen Johnson; Frank Coffey | Homeward Bound (2004), novel | United States Air and Space Force Mission to Home (alien planet) Admiral Peary | 1997 (leaves Earth) 2031 (arrives at Home) |
| Sam Yeager; Jonathan Yeager; Karen Yeager; Glen Johnson; Frank Coffey | Slower-than-light sleeper ship sent as a diplomatic mission to Home, the homeworld of an alien species that partially colonized Earth. | | |
| Charles Burkes, (Note: Spelled "Burke" in shooting script.) Capt. (USAF) (Commander); Kelly Lanahan, Lt. (Note: Rank is Captain in shooting script.) (Second in command); Ivan Hood, 2nd Lt. (D.O.) (USAF); Aida Munoz, 2nd Lt. | Alien Apocalypse (2005), TV movie | NASA: Probe Mission | Future |
| Charles Burkes, Capt. (USAF) (Commander); Kelly Lanahan, Lt. (Second in command); Ivan Hood, 2nd Lt. (D.O.) (USAF); Aida Munoz, 2nd Lt. | Astronauts return from 40-year mission using cryogenic technology to place probe in deep space; they find Earth overrun by giant alien mites. | | |
| Astronaut One; Astronaut Two | Astronauts (2005), short film | Unknown | Future |
| Astronaut One; Astronaut Two | Comic misadventures of two astronauts on distant space mission. | | |
| Charles T. "Chuck" Baker, Capt. | Planet 51 (2009), film | Odyssey (command module); Lander | c. 2026 (April) |
| Charles T. "Chuck" Baker, Capt. | NASA astronaut captured by aliens on distant planet. | | |
| Finalists: White; Smith; Hawkins Morpheus Eleven: Rock, Ph.D. | Keyhole Factory (2010), novel Morpheus: Biblionaut (2010), electronic fiction | NASA: Morpheus Eleven (Note: Mission named in Morpheus: Biblionaut only.) | 2003 – 2018 |
| Finalists: White; Smith; Hawkins Morpheus Eleven: Rock, Ph.D. | Astronaut/poet Rock (known as the "Biblionaut") on mission to Alpha Centauri to test planet-destroying weapon. All four finalists for mission are poets; Smith is a spaceflight veteran who staged first performance of Hamlet in weightlessness. | | |
| Tully, Capt. (Commander) (no first name given); Unnamed copilot Unnamed crewmembers | Superman: Deep Space Hijack (2010), chapter book | S.T.A.R. Labs: Long Range Space Explorer; Rescue ship | Unknown |
| Tully, Capt. (Commander) (no first name given); Unnamed copilot Unnamed crewmembers | Astronauts returning from mission outside solar system crash-land on Pluto. | | |
| Sam (no last name given) (England); Unnamed crewmembers | Capsule (2011), short film | Unknown | Future |
| Sam (no last name given) (England); Unnamed crewmembers | Young man floats in escape pod after spacecraft explodes in deep space. Spacecraft was launched from Houston. | | |
| Mike Scudderman | "Transcript of Interaction Between Astronaut Mike Scudderman and the OnStar Hands-Free A.I. Crash Advisor" (2011), short short story | Unknown | Future |
| Mike Scudderman | Astronaut aboard interstellar spacecraft speaks to unhelpful A.I. after crash landing on alien planet. | | |
| Lino Martinez (later known as "Otim"); Ilen; Unnamed astronauts | Góry Parnasu (a.k.a. The Mountains of Parnassus) (2012), novel | Astronauts' Union | Late 21st century |
| Lino Martinez (later known as "Otim"); Ilen; Unnamed astronauts | Married couple on journey to planet Sardion aboard spacecraft traveling at 99.5% of lightspeed. | | |
| Traveler (unnamed) | Grounded (2012), short film | Unknown | Future |
| Traveler (unnamed) | Astronaut has bizarre experiences after crashing on extrasolar planet. | | |
| Joseph Wood | Hibernation (2012), short film | Somnus I | 20th-21st centuries? |
| Joseph Wood | Wood is placed into hibernation for 50-year mission. | | |
| Francisco Delagurez Bon Accord: Etienne Larochelle (RCAF), Cmdr; Moire Cameron (USAF), pilot Michiko; Other unnamed astronauts | The Long Way Home (2012), novel | Bon Accord (XS-312) | Future (Note: Story proper takes place in 2115. Moire's mission is described as taking place "...80 years and some change..." prior to this year.) |
| Francisco Delagurez Bon Accord: Etienne Larochelle (RCAF), Cmdr; Moire Cameron (USAF), pilot Michiko; Other unnamed astronauts | Crew of an experimental interstellar mission to Beta Centauri and beyond whose spacecraft suffers a major malfunction on the return journey. Delagurez took part in a later exploratory mission. | | |
| Unnamed astronauts | The Pod (2012), short film | Unknown | Future |
| Unnamed astronauts | Astronaut crashes on planet and must make dangerous journey back to spacecraft. | | |
| House of Secrets: Aune (Finland); Gwenda (US?); Mei; Portia; Sisi (South Africa/US); Sullivan (US) (no last names given); Five unnamed astronauts (not in revision) House of Mystery: Twelve unnamed astronauts (number not specified in revision) | "Two Houses" (2012, revised 2015), short story | Original: Light House (nicknamed The House of Secrets); Leap Year (nicknamed The House of Mystery) Revision: Seeker (nicknamed House of Secrets); Messenger (nicknamed House of Mystery) | March 12, 2073 (original) After 2059 (revision) |
| House of Secrets: Aune (Finland); Gwenda (US?); Mei; Portia; Sisi (South Africa/US); Sullivan (US) (no last names given); Five unnamed astronauts (not in revision) House of Mystery: Twelve unnamed astronauts (number not specified in revision) | Astronauts in intermittent hibernation on voyage to Proxima Centauri, launched in summer 2059. House of Mystery disappears in flight. | | |
| Unnamed astronaut | XY (2012), short film | Unknown | Future |
| Unnamed astronaut | Astronaut encounters apparition of woman on distant planet. | | |
| Unnamed astronaut | Azarkant (2013), short film | Unknown | Future |
| Unnamed astronaut | Astronaut on deep space mission explores mysterious spacecraft. | | |
| Lila Suvlu, Dr. (Commander); Unnamed astronaut | Futurestates; Children of the Northern Lights (2013), TV | Exoterra Energy: S. V. Kluguya (Exploration Vessel 0032-A) | Future |
| Lila Suvlu, Dr. (Commander); Unnamed astronaut | Husband-and-wife astronauts crash on distant planet while searching for new energy sources. | | |
| Adam Fossy, Maj. | Infinite (2013), short film | Unknown | Future |
| Adam Fossy, Maj. | Fossy hibernates aboard spacecraft for infinite length of time while waiting for discovery of extraterrestrial intelligence. | | |
| Three unnamed astronauts | Mission Control (2013), short film | NASA/Russian Space Agency: Icarus | Near Future |
| Three unnamed astronauts | International mission to explore Kepler-22b faces prospect of fatal explosion after liftoff. | | |
| Eugene (no last name given) | The Pod (2013), short film | Cosmonaut Division; American Unit | Future |
| Eugene (no last name given) | Cosmonaut in hibernation pod is forced to admit to adultery. | | |
| Space Shuttle: Unnamed astronauts Project Kronos: Unnamed brain donor Human 2.0 Project: Unnamed Human 2.0 astronauts | Project Kronos (2013), short film | Space Agency Inc.: Space Shuttle; Project Kronos Defence Department: Human 2.0 Project | c. 2019 – 2035 |
| Space Shuttle: Unnamed astronauts Project Kronos: Unnamed brain donor Human 2.0 Project: Unnamed Human 2.0 astronauts | Project Kronos sends live human brain on interstellar journey. Human 2.0 Project creates astronauts with human brains in artificial bodies. Expanded into 2018 feature film The Beyond (q.v.). | | |
| Unnamed astronauts | Entity (2014), short film | SEV Omega T26 | Future |
| Unnamed astronauts | Astronaut ejected from destroyed spacecraft travels through dimensional portal. | | |
| Sally Pascal, Capt. | I Am Here (aka The Journey of Sally Pascal) (2014), short film | USS Vision Quest (Anthro-Robotic spaceship): Solo Journey | Future |
| Sally Pascal, Capt. | Trainee pilot attempting to reach wormhole for return to Earth. | | |
| Lazarus missions: Hugh Mann, Dr. Wolf Edmunds; Laura Miller; Wong, Dr. Hale, Dr. Morin, Dr. Yashin, Dr. Lee, Dr. Oita, Dr. Ostro, Dr. Pila, Dr. Somov, Dr. Endurance: Joseph "Coop" Cooper (Pilot); Amelia Brand, Dr. Doyle; Nikolai "Rom" Romilly (Astrophysicist) | Interstellar (2014), film/novel | NASA: Lazarus missions (12 Ranger spaceplanes) Endurance (incorporates 2 Rangers) | Future (21st century) |
| Lazarus missions: Hugh Mann, Dr. Wolf Edmunds; Laura Miller; Wong, Dr. Hale, Dr. Morin, Dr. Yashin, Dr. Lee, Dr. Oita, Dr. Ostro, Dr. Pila, Dr. Somov, Dr. Endurance: Joseph "Coop" Cooper (Pilot); Amelia Brand, Dr. Doyle; Nikolai "Rom" Romilly (Astrophysicist) | Astronauts travel through wormhole near Saturn to distant galaxy in search of new home for humanity, which is in danger of extinction. | | |
| Shannon Wendell (Mission Specialist) | Odessa (2014), short film | National Aeronautics and Space Organization (NASO) | Near Future |
| Shannon Wendell (Mission Specialist) | Astronaut about to depart on mission to extrasolar planet using hibernation. | | |
| Astronaut 35; Astronaut 41; Astronaut 42 | Project Skyborn (2014), short film | Unknown | Unknown |
| Astronaut 35; Astronaut 41; Astronaut 42 | Mysterious events on moon of ringed planet. | | |
| ISRA 88: Harold S. Richards, Lt. Col. (Pilot); Abraham Anderson, Ph.D. (Marine Biologist) (Science Officer) ISRA 88: Lynch (Pilot); Decker (Epidemiologist) (Science Officer) (no first names given) | Beyond the Edge (aka ISRA 88) (2015), film | United States: ISRA 88 | Future? |
| ISRA 88: Harold S. Richards, Lt. Col. (Pilot); Abraham Anderson, Ph.D. (Marine Biologist) (Science Officer) ISRA 88: Lynch (Pilot); Decker (Epidemiologist) (Science Officer) (no first names given) | Astronauts on mission to the edge of the universe. | | |
| Unnamed Captain; Two unnamed astronauts | "Green Smoke" (2015), short story | N/A | Future |
| Unnamed Captain; Two unnamed astronauts | Astronauts possessed by lifeform in green smoke on unexplored planet. | | |
| Unnamed astronaut | Lone (2015), short film | Unknown | Future |
| Unnamed astronaut | Astronaut aboard faster-than-light ship searching for life on planet 1200 light years from Earth. | | |
| James Morrison, Cmdr. (UK) | Superluminal (2015), short film | Unknown | Future |
| James Morrison, Cmdr. (UK) | Young astronaut discovers life on alien moon. | | |
| Marcus; Noe | Asteria (2016), short film | Earth: Hermes 777 | Future |
| Marcus; Noe | Human astronauts and aliens arrive on distant planet at same time. | | |
| Silvie (no last name given) | "The Astronaut, Her Lover, the Queen of Faerie, and Their Child" (2016), short story | Unknown (United States) | Unknown |
| Silvie (no last name given) | Silvie may be astronaut on secret interstellar mission, the Faerie Queen's lover, both or neither. | | |
| Longshot: Ethan Kane, Cmdr. | FTL (aka Faster Than Light) (2016), short film | NASA: Longshot International Space Station; Mars Colony One | Future |
| Longshot: Ethan Kane, Cmdr. | Astronaut attempting first faster-than-light mission to Mars loses control of spacecraft and makes first contact with alien intelligence. | | |
| Two unnamed astronauts | In the Universe (2016), short film | V (spacecraft similar to Apollo command and service module) | Future |
| Two unnamed astronauts | Astronaut on deep-space mission; his girlfriend follows him into space. | | |
| Unnamed astronaut | Off (2016), short film | Unknown | Future |
| Unnamed astronaut | Astronaut has surreal adventure. | | |
| Unnamed astronaut | RunCatRun (2016), short film | Unknown | Future |
| Unnamed astronaut | Astronaut traveling through wormhole switches bodies with cat. | | |
| Unnamed astronaut | "The Astronaut" (2017), short story | Unknown | Future |
| Unnamed astronaut | Astronaut stranded on distant planet seeks bat-like creature in order to make antidote for poisoned bite. | | |
| Abel (no last name given) | Athena (2017), short film | Unknown | Future |
| Abel (no last name given) | Astronaut stranded on moon of ringed planet after exposure to unknown pathogen. | | |
| C. Marlow; Unnamed astronauts | Explorers (2017), short film | NASA et al: Colbert; Space station Various unnamed spacecraft | Future |
| C. Marlow; Unnamed astronauts | Vignettes of future space exploration. | | |
| Unnamed pilot | Hyper Jump (2017), short film | NASA | Future |
| Unnamed pilot | Astronaut prepares to make history's first hyperdrive launch. | | |
| Nina (no last name given) | The Jump (2017), short film | Unknown | Future |
| Nina (no last name given) | Astronaut traveling through wormhole remains young while her lover on Earth grows old. | | |
| Lilian (United States) (no last name given) | Nine Minutes (2017), short film | United Earth Space Administration (UESA): Bravo 2 | Near Future |
| Lilian (United States) (no last name given) | Astronaut searching for solutions to energy crisis whose spacecraft crashes on takeoff from distant planet. | | |
| Space Agency Inc.: Charles Higgins (Chief Mission Controller) Human 2.0 candidates: Cassandra Knowles (Astrophysicist); Vladimir Kominski (Virologist); AJ Robinson (Air Force Pilot); Jane Lovett (Cosmologist); Grant Obole (Geologist); Linda Marcell (Trainee Astronaut); Carl Roberts (Recon Drone Pilot) Human 2.0 mission: Jessica Johnson (Cosmologist); Unnamed military Human 2.0 International Space Station: Jim Marcell (US); Francois (no last name given); James Good; Unnamed astronaut | The Beyond (2018), film | Space Agency Inc.: Human 2.0 mission (Note: Spacecraft/rocket named "Jupiter X" in deleted scene.) International Space Station; Soyuz | c. 2015? |
| Space Agency Inc.: Charles Higgins (Chief Mission Controller) Human 2.0 candidates: Cassandra Knowles (Astrophysicist); Vladimir Kominski (Virologist); AJ Robinson (Air Force Pilot); Jane Lovett (Cosmologist); Grant Obole (Geologist); Linda Marcell (Trainee Astronaut); Carl Roberts (Recon Drone Pilot) Human 2.0 mission: Jessica Johnson (Cosmologist); Unnamed military Human 2.0 International Space Station: Jim Marcell (US); Francois (no last name given); James Good; Unnamed astronaut | When a wormhole appears in Earth orbit, Space Agency recruits volunteers to have their brains implanted in robotic bodies to travel through the wormhole. Higgins is a former astronaut. Roberts is the initial choice for the Human 2.0 mission. | | |
| A. Nythem | Void (2018), short film | United States; EVSP: SPS 11 | Contemporary? |
| A. Nythem | Astronaut travels into parallel universes through mysterious holes in deep space. | | |
| Four unnamed astronauts | Contact (2019), short film | Unknown | Future |
| Four unnamed astronauts | Astronaut stranded on white planet contacts astronaut stranded on red planet. Two other astronauts appear in crew photo with astronaut on white planet. | | |
