= List of fictional astronauts (exploration of outer Solar System) =

Lists of fictional astronauts
Early period	Project Mercury	Project Gemini
Project Apollo	1975–1989	1990–1999
2000–2009	2010–2029	Moon
Inner Solar System	Outer Solar System	Other
Far future

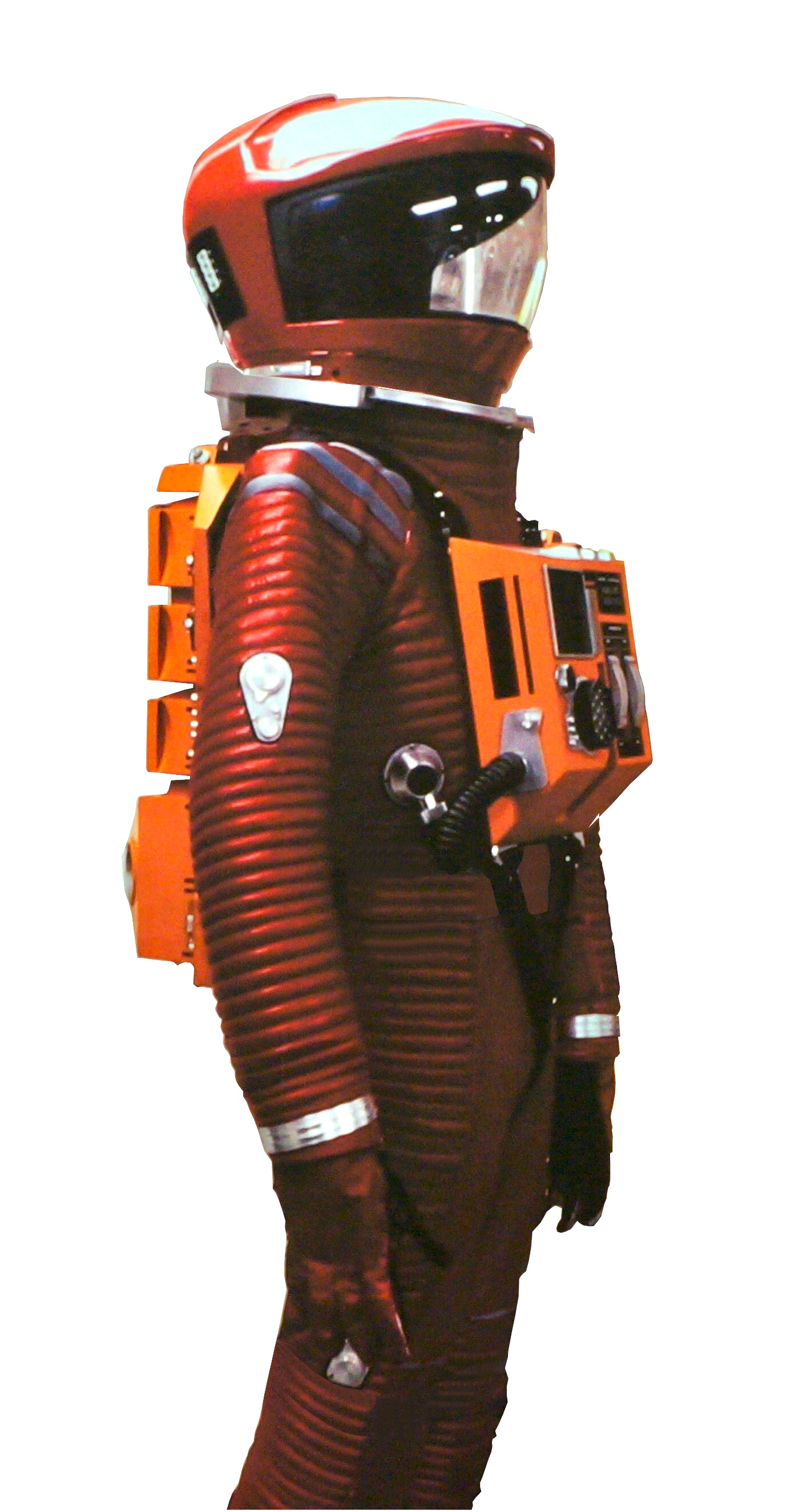
Spacesuit worn by actor Keir Dullea as David Bowman in 2001: A Space Odyssey

The following is a list of fictional astronauts exploring the outer Solar System.

== Jupiter ==
Name(s)	Appeared in	Program / Mission / Spacecraft	Fictional date
K. "Fuj" Fuji (Japan); F. Glenn (United States)	Invasion of Astro-Monster (a.k.a. Monster Zero, Battle of the Astros, Godzilla Vs Monster Zero) (1965), film	World Space Agency (Note: "World Space Authority" in American version.) (WSA): Spaceship P-1	196X [sic]
K. "Fuj" Fuji (Japan); F. Glenn (United States)	Astronauts on mission to "Planet X", newly discovered satellite of Jupiter.		
Bramley, Capt. Weeke (F/O); Rand, Cmdr. 38 unnamed astronauts	Plague from Space (1965), novel	Pericles	Near Future?
Bramley, Capt. Weeke (F/O); Rand, Cmdr. 38 unnamed astronauts	Crew of the first mission to land on Jupiter. The sole survivor returns to Earth carrying a deadly disease. Revised as The Jupiter Plague (1982).		
David Bowman, Dr. (Commander); Frank Poole, Dr. (Co-Pilot); Charles Hunter, Dr. Jack R. Kimball, Dr. Victor F. Kaminsky, Dr.	2001: A Space Odyssey (1968), film/novel	National Council of Astronautics (US): Discovery One	1999 – 2001 (Note: According to opening sequence of 2010 film.)
David Bowman, Dr. (Commander); Frank Poole, Dr. (Co-Pilot); Charles Hunter, Dr. Jack R. Kimball, Dr. Victor F. Kaminsky, Dr.	Astronauts on a mission to find an alien artifact near Jupiter (on Iapetus in the book, and Kimball was renamed Whitehead).		
Guy Crayford, Cmdr.	Doctor Who; The Android Invasion (1975), TV (1978 novel)	XK-5 Space Raider	Contemporary/Near Future
Guy Crayford, Cmdr.	UK Senior Space Defence astronaut vanished, presumed dead, on Jupiter mission. Saved by Kraal alien race who use him in their plans for invasion of Earth.		
30 unnamed astronauts (15 men, 15 women)	The Better Angels (1979), novel	United States: Humanity (mother ship); Landing craft	c. 1992 – 1996
30 unnamed astronauts (15 men, 15 women)	Astronauts who arrive on Ganymede after four-year voyage.		
Alexei Leonov: Tanya Kirbuk (Soviet Air Force) (Commander); Vladimir Rudenko; Vasili Orlov, Dr. Maxim "Max" Brailovsky; Irina Yakunina; Heywood R. Floyd, Dr. (US); R. Chandra, Dr. (US); Walter Curnow, Dr. (Engineer) (US) Tsien: Chang, Professor (First name not given); Lee, Dr. (First name not given); Three unnamed astronauts	2010: Odyssey Two (1982), novel 2010 (a.k.a. 2010: The Year We Make Contact) (1984), film	Alexei Leonov Tsien (China)	2010
Alexei Leonov: Tanya Kirbuk (Soviet Air Force) (Commander); Vladimir Rudenko; Vasili Orlov, Dr. Maxim "Max" Brailovsky; Irina Yakunina; Heywood R. Floyd, Dr. (US); R. Chandra, Dr. (US); Walter Curnow, Dr. (Engineer) (US) Tsien: Chang, Professor (First name not given); Lee, Dr. (First name not given); Three unnamed astronauts	Astronauts on a follow-up mission to Jupiter to investigate the loss of Discovery One. Tsien makes disastrous first crewed landing on Europa.		
Amity: Mac McGuire; Marjorie "Marj" Aubuchon (Surgeon); Ed Iseminger Greenswallow: Herman Selma (Mission commander); Catherine "Cathie" Perth (Journalist); Rob Sawyer Tolstoi: Victor Landolfi; Esther Crowley; Unnamed astronaut Catherine Perth: Ed Iseminger; Unnamed crew	Promises to Keep (1984), short story	The Program: Amity; Greenswallow; Tolstoi (three Athena vehicles) Catherine Perth	Future (December)
Amity: Mac McGuire; Marjorie "Marj" Aubuchon (Surgeon); Ed Iseminger Greenswallow: Herman Selma (Mission commander); Catherine "Cathie" Perth (Journalist); Rob Sawyer Tolstoi: Victor Landolfi; Esther Crowley; Unnamed astronaut Catherine Perth: Ed Iseminger; Unnamed crew	Expedition to Jovian system in three linked vehicles. Catherine Perth, equipped with fusion engine, is built for rescue mission to be launched six years later. Frank Steinitz is named as commander of first Saturn expedition aboard five Athena vehicles (including Amity, Greenswallow and Tolstoi) fifteen years earlier.		
Jacob Hols; Juliet "Julie" Burton; Martha Kivelsen	The Very Pulse of The Machine (1998), short story	First Galilean Satellites Exploratory Mission	Future (Late 21st century?)
Jacob Hols; Juliet "Julie" Burton; Martha Kivelsen	First crewed landing on Io leads to major discoveries and tragedy. Landing site near Daedalus.		
Hachirota Hoshino; Werner Locksmith; Hakim Ashmead; Kho Cheng-Shin; Goro Hoshino	Planetes (2003), anime	Von Braun	2075
Hachirota Hoshino; Werner Locksmith; Hakim Ashmead; Kho Cheng-Shin; Goro Hoshino	First crewed space mission to Jupiter.		
Matthew David (Commander) (no last name given); Kara Elizabeth (Exobiologist) (no last name given); Jeff "Wink" Winkermann	The Constellation of Sylvie (2005), novel	NASA: Heartland (CSM/LEM)	Near Future (2032 – 2040?) (Note: Pages 136 and 184 possibly imply that the book ends 123 years after 1917.)
Matthew David (Commander) (no last name given); Kara Elizabeth (Exobiologist) (no last name given); Jeff "Wink" Winkermann	First crewed mission to Jupiter gathers ice containing biomorphing microbes from Jovian moon, causing crew to revert to childhood. Landing near Mount Pwyll.		
Kim Kronotska, Cmdr. Tom Braudy; Samuel (no last name given)	Doctor Who; Memory Lane (2006), audio play	Led Zeppelin IV	2010s (?)
Kim Kronotska, Cmdr. Tom Braudy; Samuel (no last name given)	Commonwealth Space Programme mission to Jupiter that goes wrong.		
Yuri Lennon, Capt.	Yuri Lennon's Landing on Alpha 46 (2010), short film	Little Girl (lander)	Future
Yuri Lennon, Capt.	Astronaut lands on moon of Jupiter to investigate mysterious signal. Mission control in Houston.		
Michael Forrest (Commander/Pilot); Nathaniel "Nathan" Miller (Biologist/Geologist/Oceanographer/Doctor)	Astronaut: The Last Push (aka The Last Push) (2012), film	Moffitt Industries: Life One "Little Ahab" (submersible)	2017 – 2022
Michael Forrest (Commander/Pilot); Nathaniel "Nathan" Miller (Biologist/Geologist/Oceanographer/Doctor)	Mission to Europa with Venus gravity assist goes wrong when micrometeoroid strikes spacecraft.		
Dun "William" Xu (Commander); Rosa Dasque (Pilot/Archivist); Daniel Luxembourg, Dr. (Chief Science Officer); Katya Petrovna, Dr. (Science Officer); Andrei Blok (Chief Engineer); James Corrigan (Engineer)	Europa Report (2013), film	Europa Ventures: Europa One	Near Future
Dun "William" Xu (Commander); Rosa Dasque (Pilot/Archivist); Daniel Luxembourg, Dr. (Chief Science Officer); Katya Petrovna, Dr. (Science Officer); Andrei Blok (Chief Engineer); James Corrigan (Engineer)	First crewed mission to Europa discovers life under the ice. Landing in Conamara Chaos, near Thera Macula and Thrace Macula.		
Unnamed astronaut	Voice Over (2013), short film	Unknown	Future
Unnamed astronaut	Astronaut trying to reach oxygen supply after crash landing, possibly on one of Jupiter's moons. (Note: One of the planets in the sky appears to be Ganymede.)		
Gordon Harper, Ph.D. (Commander) (USAF); Tal (Pilot/Physicist); Nisha T. Devi (Engineer) (India); Ivanov (Astrogeologist/Physician) (Russia) "Sully" Sullivan, Ph.D. (Mission Specialist); Thebes (Engineer) (South Africa)	Good Morning, Midnight (2016), novel	Shuttle Aether; Landing modules International Space Station; Soyuz	Future (21st century)
Gordon Harper, Ph.D. (Commander) (USAF); Tal (Pilot/Physicist); Nisha T. Devi (Engineer) (India); Ivanov (Astrogeologist/Physician) (Russia) "Sully" Sullivan, Ph.D. (Mission Specialist); Thebes (Engineer) (South Africa)	Astronauts returning to Earth from Jupiter after losing contact with Mission Control; made landings on Ganymede and Callisto. Harper and Sullivan are ISS veterans; Harper holds world record for greatest number of spaceflights.		
Quebec Space Agency: Luc Côté, OQ (CEO) Projet-M: Vincent Köhler, OQ (Commander); Andréa Sakedaris, OQ (Dr.) (Scientific Officer); Jonathan "Jo" Leforest, OQ (Mission Specialist); Justine Roberval, OQ (Flight Specialist) German National Station: Philip Dreker (Commander) Russian National Station: Kelvin Ivanovitch Droski (Commander); Two unnamed cosmonauts	1000 Days in Space (a.k.a. Project-M) (2018), film	Agence Spatiale Québécoise/Quebec Space Agency; Projet-M (Project-M): M-Station (space station); Escape capsule German National Station Russian National Station; Soyuz	Future
Quebec Space Agency: Luc Côté, OQ (CEO) Projet-M: Vincent Köhler, OQ (Commander); Andréa Sakedaris, OQ (Dr.) (Scientific Officer); Jonathan "Jo" Leforest, OQ (Mission Specialist); Justine Roberval, OQ (Flight Specialist) German National Station: Philip Dreker (Commander) Russian National Station: Kelvin Ivanovitch Droski (Commander); Two unnamed cosmonauts	Astronauts spending 1000 days on space station to prove viability of mission to Europa when nuclear war breaks out on Earth. Köhler was the second man on Mars. Côté previously flew in Earth orbit with Sky Xplorer Industries, an American company.		
Amy Michaels (NASA) (Commander); Francesca Rossi (ESA) (Mission Pilot); Hayato Masukoshi (JAXA) (Engineer); Martin Neumayer (ESA) (Engineer); Jiaying Lin (CNSA) (Exobiologist/Geologist)	The Io Encounter (2018), novel	ILSE; Landing modules	2046 – 2049
Amy Michaels (NASA) (Commander); Francesca Rossi (ESA) (Mission Pilot); Hayato Masukoshi (JAXA) (Engineer); Martin Neumayer (ESA) (Engineer); Jiaying Lin (CNSA) (Exobiologist/Geologist)	Crewed mission to Jupiter's moon Io to search for life. The ILSE return to Earth from Saturn's moons Enceladus and Titan.		

== Saturn ==
Name(s)	Appeared in	Program / Mission / Spacecraft	Fictional date
Renaissance: Shaun Geoffrey Christopher (a.k.a. Sean Geoffrey, Sean Jeffrey, Sean Jeoffrey), Col. (Commander); Shirin Ludden, Cmdr. (Pilot) Lewis & Clark: Shaun Geoffrey Christopher (Commander); Alice Fontana, Capt. (Canada) (Co-Pilot); Marcus O'Herlihy, Dr.	Star Trek; Tomorrow Is Yesterday (1967), TV Star Trek; The Rings of Time (2012), novel	Space Shuttle; Renaissance U.S.S. Lewis & Clark	June 2020 – January 2021
Renaissance: Shaun Geoffrey Christopher (a.k.a. Sean Geoffrey, Sean Jeffrey, Sean Jeoffrey), Col. (Commander); Shirin Ludden, Cmdr. (Pilot) Lewis & Clark: Shaun Geoffrey Christopher (Commander); Alice Fontana, Capt. (Canada) (Co-Pilot); Marcus O'Herlihy, Dr.	The first "probe" to travel from Earth to Saturn.		
Stan Brandon, Maj. (New Zealand) (Pilot); Nissim Ben-Haim, Dr. (Israel) (Physicist); Aldo Gabrielli, Dr. (US) (Electronic Engineer)	"Pressure" (1969), short story	C. Huygens (aka "the Ball")	Future
Stan Brandon, Maj. (New Zealand) (Pilot); Nissim Ben-Haim, Dr. (Israel) (Physicist); Aldo Gabrielli, Dr. (US) (Electronic Engineer)	First crewed attempt to reach surface of Saturn. C. Huygens is a ball-shaped craft assembled at Saturn One satellite station.		
Steve West, Col. Two other astronauts	The Incredible Melting Man (1977), film	Scorpio V Scorpio VII	Future
Steve West, Col. Two other astronauts	Astronaut whose physiology is horribly altered due to radiation exposure during the first mission to Saturn.		
Cirocco "Rocky" Jones, Capt. (Mission Commander); Bill (Chief Engineer) (no last name given); Calvin Greene, Dr. (Surgeon/Biologist/Ecologist); Gaby Plauget (Astronomer); April 15/02 Polo (Physicist); August 3/02 Polo (Physicist); Eugene Springfield (Satellite Excursion Module Pilot)	Titan (1979), novel	NASA; DSV Ringmaster	2025
Cirocco "Rocky" Jones, Capt. (Mission Commander); Bill (Chief Engineer) (no last name given); Calvin Greene, Dr. (Surgeon/Biologist/Ecologist); Gaby Plauget (Astronomer); April 15/02 Polo (Physicist); August 3/02 Polo (Physicist); Eugene Springfield (Satellite Excursion Module Pilot)	NASA astronauts who discover alien artifact in orbit around Saturn. The Polo sisters are clones.		
Jean Broberg (Physicist); Mark Danzig (Chemist); Luis Garcilaso (Pilot); Colin Scobie (Geologist)	The Saturn Game (1981), novella	Moon lander	c. 2057
Jean Broberg (Physicist); Mark Danzig (Chemist); Luis Garcilaso (Pilot); Colin Scobie (Geologist)	Expedition from colony-size ship Chronos makes first crewed landing on Iapetus, but is endangered by expedition members' absorption in a fantasy role-playing game.		
NTI geological research team: Ted Lonergan; Howard Dunn Concorde: Unnamed mission coordinator Unnamed technicians Shenandoah: David Perkins (Mission Commander); Mike Davidson, (Note: Spelled "Davison" in closing credits.) Cmdr. (Captain); Melanie Bryce (Security Officer); Susan Delambre (Scientist); Beth Sladen (Engineer); Jon Fennel (Researcher); Wendy H. Oliver, Dr. (Biophysicist/Medic) Richter Dynamics spacecraft: Hans Rudy Hofner; 21 unnamed personnel	Creature (a.k.a. The Titan Find) (1985), film	NTI Corporation (United States): Concorde (space station orbiting Earth's Moon); Shenandoah Richter Dynamics (West Germany)	Future (from April 5)
NTI geological research team: Ted Lonergan; Howard Dunn Concorde: Unnamed mission coordinator Unnamed technicians Shenandoah: David Perkins (Mission Commander); Mike Davidson, Cmdr. (Captain); Melanie Bryce (Security Officer); Susan Delambre (Scientist); Beth Sladen (Engineer); Jon Fennel (Researcher); Wendy H. Oliver, Dr. (Biophysicist/Medic) Richter Dynamics spacecraft: Hans Rudy Hofner; 21 unnamed personnel	Personnel from rival companies searching for alien artifacts on Titan.		
Alan Greene (Expedition overseer); Consuelo Hong (Organic chemist); Elizabeth O'Brien	"Slow Life" (2002), novelette	NAFTASA: Clement; Harry Stubbs (lander)	Future
Alan Greene (Expedition overseer); Consuelo Hong (Organic chemist); Elizabeth O'Brien	Astronauts on expedition to Titan.		
Unnamed cosmonaut	Glory to the Conquerors of Space (2008), short film	Soviet Union (Soyuz?)	Unknown
Unnamed cosmonaut	Female cosmonaut meets purple-skinned humanoids on Titan.		
Unnamed astronaut	The Forgotten Astronaut (2013), short film	Space Shuttle; Voyager 6	2012
Unnamed astronaut	Astronaut returns from secret mission to Saturn, but no one on Earth remembers him. Mission launched c. early 1980s.		
Jack Harper (USA) (Mission Commander); Victoria "Vika" Olsen (UK); Yulia Rusakova (Russia); K. Ishioka (Japan); Five unnamed astronauts	Oblivion (2013), film	NASA: Odyssey	c. 2017
Jack Harper (USA) (Mission Commander); Victoria "Vika" Olsen (UK); Yulia Rusakova (Russia); K. Ishioka (Japan); Five unnamed astronauts	Crewed mission to Saturn's moon Titan is diverted to investigate a strange extraterrestrial tetrahedral object. Harper and Olsen are abducted and cloned, while the other hibernating crew members automatically return to Earth. The Odyssey was launched in 2015 and encounters the object in 2017.		
Amy Michaels (NASA) (Mission Commander); Francesca Rossi (ESA) (Mission Pilot); Hayato Masukoshi (JAXA) (Engineer); Martin Neumayer (ESA) (Engineer); Jiaying Lin (CNSA) (Exobiologist/Geologist); Dmitri "Mytia" Marchenko (FKA) (Physician/Biochemist)	The Enceladus Mission (2017), novel The Titan Probe (2018), novel	ILSE; Landing modules	2046 – 2049
Amy Michaels (NASA) (Mission Commander); Francesca Rossi (ESA) (Mission Pilot); Hayato Masukoshi (JAXA) (Engineer); Martin Neumayer (ESA) (Engineer); Jiaying Lin (CNSA) (Exobiologist/Geologist); Dmitri "Mytia" Marchenko (FKA) (Physician/Biochemist)	International mission travels to Saturn's moons Enceladus and Titan to search for life.		
Unnamed astronauts	What If You Fell Into Saturn? (2018), short film	NASA	Future
Unnamed astronauts	Educational cartoon about what would happen if spacewalking astronaut fell into Saturn.		
Ashley Maverick, Dr. Chaser I: Tom (no last name given)	Titan (2019), short film	NASA: Chaser I	c. 2068 (Note: Apollo 11 Moon landing was "just under 100 years ago".)
Ashley Maverick, Dr. Chaser I: Tom (no last name given)	NASA astronaut on solo mission to colonize Titan. Chaser spacecraft has FTL engines. Dr. Maverick pioneered commercial interplanetary exploration with flight to Karman Line.		
Franks, Capt. John; Nash	Slingshot (2024), film	Odyssey 1	Future
Franks, Capt. John; Nash	Mission to Titan (with gravity assist at Jupiter) which may or may not be what it seems.		
Walt Gribiel (USA): Mission commander/Engineer; Kelly Baldwing (USA): Mission Pilot/Medic; Stuart Fraser (USA): Flight Engineer; Oleg Vyshnisky (USSR): Propulsion Specialist; Elena Beaufort (Germany): Geologist	For All Mankind (TV Series) (Season 5)	Sojouner T	Alternative 2012
Walt Gribiel (USA): Mission commander/Engineer; Kelly Baldwing (USA): Mission Pilot/Medic; Stuart Fraser (USA): Flight Engineer; Oleg Vyshnisky (USSR): Propulsion Specialist; Elena Beaufort (Germany): Geologist	First crewed mission to Titan, the largest Saturn Moon		

== Uranus ==
Name(s)	Appeared in	Program / Mission / Spacecraft	Fictional date
Eric Nilsson, Cmdr. (Denmark); Donald Graham, Capt. Karl Heinrich, Lt. Cmdr. (Astrogator); Barry O'Sullivan (Ireland) (Communications Officer); Svend Viltoft (Chief Engineer)	Journey to the Seventh Planet (1962), film	United Nations: Explorer 12	2001
Eric Nilsson, Cmdr. (Denmark); Donald Graham, Capt. Karl Heinrich, Lt. Cmdr. (Astrogator); Barry O'Sullivan (Ireland) (Communications Officer); Svend Viltoft (Chief Engineer)	Astronauts on Uranus encounter dangers drawn from their own minds.		
Unnamed astronaut	The Old Astronaut (2014), short film	NASA	Future
Unnamed astronaut	Elderly veteran of missions to Mercury, Venus and Mars plots to crash spacecraft into Uranus.		

== Neptune ==
Name(s)	Appeared in	Program / Mission / Spacecraft	Fictional date
Event Horizon: John Kilpack (UK) Capitain; Chris Chambers; Ben Fender; Janice Reuben; Dick Smith; Yusef Quinn (Turkey) Chief Engenieer; Devlin Conners (Australia) Navigator; Nia Atwell (India) Communications officer Peter Adijei (Nigeria) Ship's Physician; Jennifer Kown (USA) Quantum Physicist Lewis & Clark: S.J. Miller, Capt. M.I. Starck, Lt. (Executive Officer); T.F. "Coop" Cooper (Rescue Technician); D.J. (EMS/Trauma) (no last name given); F.M. "Baby Bear" Justin (Engineering); Peters (Medical Technician) (no first name given); W.F. "Smitty" Smith (Pilot); William Weir, Dr. (IASA) Rescue 1: Unnamed crewmembers	Event Horizon (1997), film	Daylight Station (space station); Event Horizon US Aerospace Command (U.S.A.C.): Lewis & Clark; Rescue 1	2047
Event Horizon launched in 2040 on mission to Proxima Centauri with experimental "gravity drive"; disappears on January 23, 2040. The ship reappears in Neptune space in 2047; Lewis & Clark is sent to investigate. Dr. Weir was the Event Horizon's designer. Edmund "Eddie" Corrick, a bosun, served with Miller on the Goliath and was killed in an onboard fire.
Unnamed astronaut	Empsillnes (2015), short film	Unknown	Future
Unnamed astronaut	Lone astronaut confronts menacing spacecraft in orbit of planet that appears to be Neptune.		
Unnamed astronauts	Atlas (2016), short film	United Nations: Odyssey	2066 – October 5, 2068
Unnamed astronauts	Odyssey disappears 900 days into mission to outer Solar System to investigate Atlas-157, a mysterious object in Neptunian orbit. Odyssey traveled to Neptune via Jupiter and Saturn. Mission controlled from Houston.		
Thomas Pruitt, Col. Lima Project: H. Clifford McBride, Dr. (USAF) (Commander); Unnamed astronauts Cepheus: Lawrence Tanner, Capt. (Commander); Donald Stanford (Co-pilot); Lorraine Deavers; Franklin Yoshida; Roy R. McBride, Maj.	Ad Astra (2019), film	United States Space Command (SPACECOM): Lima Project; Cepheus	Near Future
Thomas Pruitt, Col. Lima Project: H. Clifford McBride, Dr. (USAF) (Commander); Unnamed astronauts Cepheus: Lawrence Tanner, Capt. (Commander); Donald Stanford (Co-pilot); Lorraine Deavers; Franklin Yoshida; Roy R. McBride, Maj.	Lima Project spacecraft disappeared on mission to Neptune. Years later, Roy McBride travels to Mars to attempt contact with his father, H. Clifford McBride, when mysterious power surges from Lima Project threaten rest of Solar System.		

== See also ==
- List of fictional astronauts (miscellaneous futuristic activities)
