= Lists of fictional astronauts =

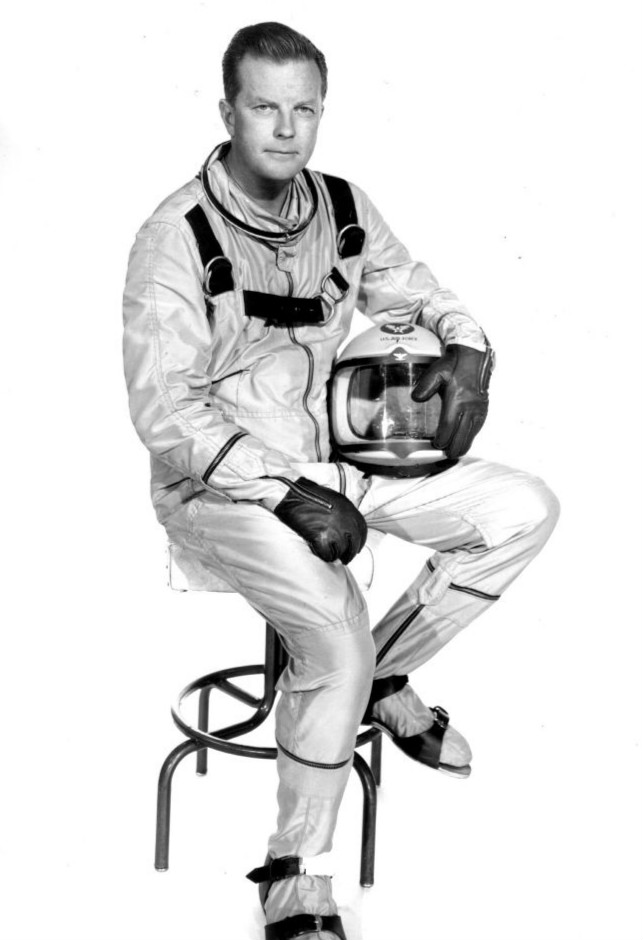
Actor William Lundigan as Col. Edward McCauley, Men into Space (TV series)

These are a series of incomplete lists of fictional astronauts appearing in various media, including books, film, television shows (live or animated), radio shows, records, and comic books.

To be included in these lists, a fictional astronaut must be modeled upon actual astronauts of real-world space programs, as they have actually existed since the beginning of the Space Age, or were envisioned in the years leading up to the Space Age. Criteria include:

1. A fictional astronaut must be human (not an alien, robot, or animal).
2. A fictional astronaut must be on a flight originating from the Earth; space travellers engaging in casual voyages between other planets (as in Star Wars or Battlestar Galactica) are not eligible.
3. A fictional astronaut must be presented as living in the period of the early exploration of space, i.e. from the beginning of the Space Age to the present, and for a few decades into the future; currently, in the period of about 1960–2060.
4. A fictional astronaut is preferably part of a real space program, like NASA or the Soviet/Russian space program, or fictional knockoffs of the same (e.g. ANSA, IASA).
5. A fictional astronaut preferably uses space travel technology within the realm of the possible. Preference should be given to astronauts depicted using real technology (e.g. Apollo, Soyuz, Space Shuttle) or close fictional knockoffs of the same.

== Fictional astronauts ==
Lists of fictional astronauts
Early period	Project Mercury	Project Gemini
Project Apollo	1975–1989	1990–1999
2000–2009	2010–2029	Moon
Inner Solar System	Outer Solar System	Other
Far future

Due to the length of this list, it has been divided into the following sections:

=== Early period ===
- List of fictional astronauts (early period)

=== Classic period ===
- List of fictional astronauts (Project Mercury era)
- List of fictional astronauts (Project Gemini era)
- List of fictional astronauts (Project Apollo era)

=== Modern period ===
- List of fictional astronauts (modern period, works released 1975–1989)
- List of fictional astronauts (modern period, works released 1990–1999)
- List of fictional astronauts (modern period, works released 2000–2009)
- List of fictional astronauts (modern period, works released 2010–2029)

=== Futuristic ===
- List of fictional astronauts (futuristic exploration of Moon)
- List of fictional astronauts (exploration of inner Solar System)
- List of fictional astronauts (exploration of outer Solar System)
- List of fictional astronauts (miscellaneous futuristic activities)
- List of fictional astronauts (beyond near-future capabilities)

== Astronauts in other media ==
Several toy astronaut dolls and action figures were produced in response to the popularity of astronauts in the 1960s. Most of them had no associated storylines. They included:

- Johnny and Jane Apollo, 1968 plastic toys with accessories including a "Moon Rover".
- Barbie, the world's most popular doll, was released with a variant space suit costume in the 1960s.
- Billy Blastoff, an apparently juvenile astronaut of the 1960s.
- The Major Matt Mason line of toys from 1968, including Major Mason himself, Lt. Jeff Long, Sgt. Storm, and Doug Davis.
- Moon McDare, a generic astronaut figure from 1965, packaged with various accessories.
- John Blackstar, Earth astronaut who crashes on planet Sagar.
- Kaito Momota, from Danganronpa V3: Killing Harmony, called "the Ultimate Astronaut".
