= List of fictional astronauts (Project Mercury era) =

Lists of fictional astronauts
Early period	Project Mercury	Project Gemini
Project Apollo	1975–1989	1990–1999
2000–2009	2010–2029	Moon
Inner Solar System	Outer Solar System	Other
Far future

The following is a list of fictional astronauts from the era of Project Mercury and the Vostok programme, the beginning of the "Golden Age" of space travel.

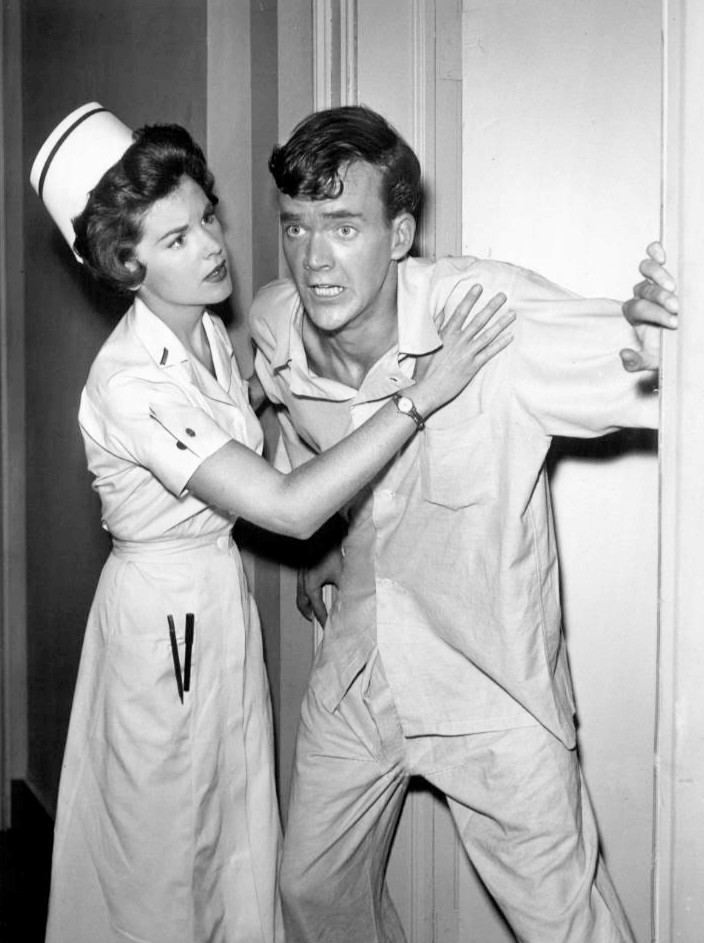
Maj. William Gart (actor Jim Hutton) panics in And When the Sky Was Opened (1959 episode of The Twilight Zone)

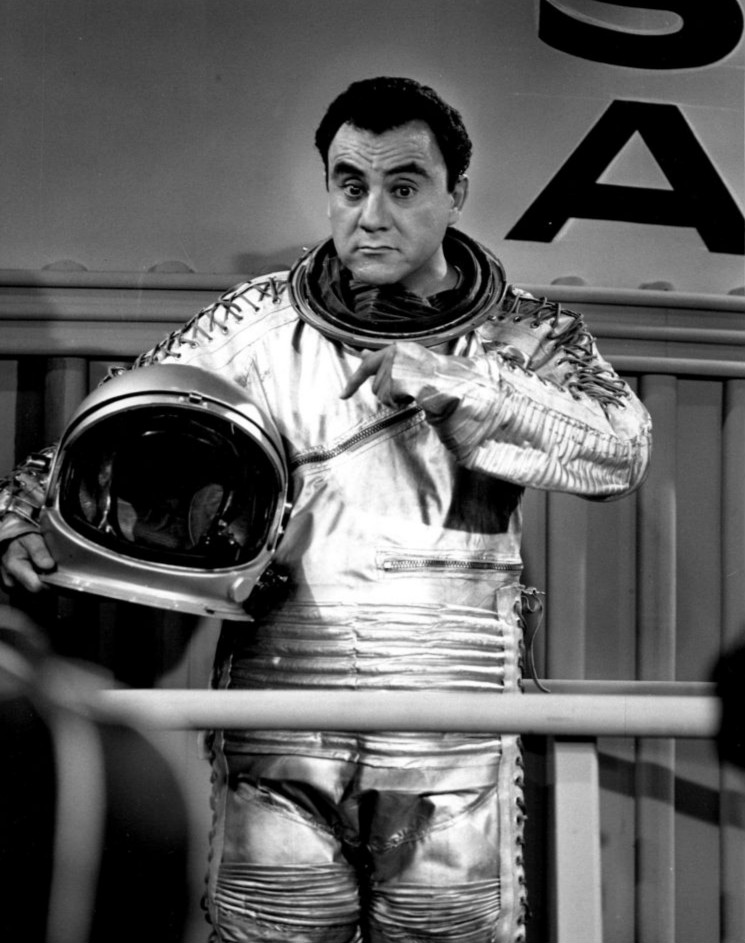
Jose Jimenez (comedian Bill Dana) in spacesuit on The Bill Dana Show

== Project Mercury era ==
Name(s)	Appeared in	Program / Mission / Spacecraft	Fictional date
Mercury (1960–1963)
"Doc" Adams, Dr. (Space medicine expert); Ed; Pete; Tom (no last names given for last three)	Sea Hunt; Diving for the Moon (1959), TV	Operation Moon Dive	Contemporary
"Doc" Adams, Dr. (Space medicine expert); Ed; Pete; Tom (no last names given for last three)	Candidates for first spacecraft crew take part in underwater survival test.		
Terry (no last name given)	"Star Mother" (1959), short story	United States: Explorer XII	Near Future (April)
Terry (no last name given)	Astronaut in one-man capsule struck by meteorite.		
Clegg Forbes, Col. Ed Harrington, Col. William Gart, Maj.	The Twilight Zone; And When the Sky Was Opened (1959), TV	United States Air Force: X-20	Contemporary/Near Future
Clegg Forbes, Col. Ed Harrington, Col. William Gart, Maj.	Astronauts return from first crewed space flight and begin to vanish from the world and people's memories.		
Adam Stepanic, Maj.	Assignment - Mara Tirana (1960), novel	Mercury?	Contemporary/Near Future (October)
Adam Stepanic, Maj.	First American to make successful spaceflight. When his spacecraft malfunctions after 20 of 26 planned orbits he is forced to bring the craft down in Romania. Spacecraft launched by Atlas rocket with second-stage Thor-Able.		
Dave Armstrong (Australia); Peter Corbitt, Flt Lt (UK); Len Cassidy (US); Jeff Burrows (US)	The Astronauts (1960), TV movie	Unknown	Contemporary/Near Future
Dave Armstrong (Australia); Peter Corbitt, Flt Lt (UK); Len Cassidy (US); Jeff Burrows (US)	Candidates to be first human in space.		
William Allison, Maj.	Beyond the Time Barrier (a.k.a. The Last Barrier) (1960), film	United States Air Force: X-80	1960 / 2024
William Allison, Maj.	Test pilot on suborbital flight in experimental aircraft travels into the future.		
Norman Puckle, Ordinary Seaman	The Bulldog Breed (1960), film	Royal Navy: Bosun	Contemporary
Norman Puckle, Ordinary Seaman	Royal Navy launches ordinary recruit into space.		
Roy Selby (Army Signal Corps)	The Clear Horizon (1960–62), TV	United States	Contemporary
Roy Selby (Army Signal Corps)	Soap opera about astronauts at Cape Canaveral.		
Three unnamed astronauts	"Egocentric Orbit" (1960), short short story	Unknown (one-man capsules)	Contemporary/Near Future
Three unnamed astronauts	First three men in Earth orbit experience unexpected psychological effects.		
Thomas H. Morris	"The Long Way Back" (1960), short story	N/A	Near Future
Thomas H. Morris	18 years after devastating nuclear war, historian Morris becomes the first man in space when he is launched aboard makeshift spacecraft to assemble solar power satellite and enable reconstruction of civilization.		
R. G. "Bob" Donlin, Col. (Commander); Corey (Flight Officer); Pierson (Flight Officer); Hudack (Navigator)	The Twilight Zone; I Shot an Arrow into the Air (1960), TV	Project XX 2: Arrow One	Contemporary/Near Future
R. G. "Bob" Donlin, Col. (Commander); Corey (Flight Officer); Pierson (Flight Officer); Hudack (Navigator)	Four survivors of eight-man crew crash on what they think is an asteroid, but turns out to be Nevada.		
Joe; Unnamed pilot	"X-15" (1960), song	X-15	1997
Joe; Unnamed pilot	Two X-15 pilots race their planes around Earth.		
Nicholai Soloviov, Dr.	Armchair Theatre; The Man Out There (1961), TV	Soviet Union: Troika	Contemporary
Nicholai Soloviov, Dr.	Cosmonaut trapped in orbit due to solar flare activity causing failure of escape tower to jettison. He assists Canadian family by radio. (Note: Telecast exactly one month before launch of Vostok 1.)		
Jose Jimenez	Jose Jimenez the Astronaut (1961), Jose Jimenez in Orbit (1962), LP records	Mercury	Contemporary
Jose Jimenez	Astronaut in the United States Interplanetary Expeditionary Force (USIEF). They were going to send a dog... but they thought that would be too cruel.		
Squarely Stable	N/A (Early 1960s)	Mercury	Contemporary
Squarely Stable	Husband of Primly Stable, super-perfect astronaut wife in skits performed by Rene Carpenter and other Mercury wives.		
Michael Alfred Robert Samson ("Mike Mars"); Johnny Bluehawk; Jack Lannigan; Rodney Harger; Joseph Stacey; Orin McMahan; Hart Williams; Todd Larner	Mike Mars series (1961–1966), novels	Project Quicksilver (X-15, Mercury, Gemini, Apollo, S-IVB space station)	Contemporary (1962–1969)
Michael Alfred Robert Samson ("Mike Mars"); Johnny Bluehawk; Jack Lannigan; Rodney Harger; Joseph Stacey; Orin McMahan; Hart Williams; Todd Larner	Astronauts in a project paralleling the actual Mercury, Gemini and Apollo projects.		
Margaret MacKenzie, Lt.	Tarzan, King of the Jungle #51; The Lost Astronaut (1961), comic	Operation High Ball	Contemporary
Margaret MacKenzie, Lt.	NASA launches a young female pilot into space on a Mercury test flight. The mission goes wrong and in an emergency re-entry, the astronaut narrowly escapes death when her capsule lands in a central African lake. Tarzan rescues her and helps her return to civilization and her home in Massachusetts.		
Campbell (First name not given); Dennis "Den" Lynds; Harry Jackson, Capt. Forrest (First name not given)	"What Need of Man?" (1961), short story	Project Argus	Contemporary/Near Future
Campbell (First name not given); Dennis "Den" Lynds; Harry Jackson, Capt. Forrest (First name not given)	Astronauts involved in the testing of a fully automated winged orbital re-entry vehicle.		
Matt Powell (NASA)	X-15 (a.k.a. Time of Departure, X-15, Time of Departure) (1961), film	X-15	Contemporary
Matt Powell (NASA)	Test pilot (loosely based on Joseph A. Walker) flies X-15 to the edge of space.		
Four unnamed astronauts "Dead-Eye" Dick Williamson, Maj. Gabby Stark, Col. Pluto III/Pluto IV: Lucius L. "Lucky" Lucas, Col. Pluto V: Myron Philpot Phipps, Maj. (Ph.D.)	The Astronaut (1962), novel	United States Air Force; Project Pluto: Pluto III; Pluto IV; Pluto V	Contemporary
Four unnamed astronauts "Dead-Eye" Dick Williamson, Maj. Gabby Stark, Col. Pluto III/Pluto IV: Lucius L. "Lucky" Lucas, Col. Pluto V: Myron Philpot Phipps, Maj. (Ph.D.)	Military Earth-orbit project in competition with U.S. Army and Navy efforts. Lucas' death is falsely announced to cover up Pluto IV launch failure; Phipps becomes first American in orbit on Pluto V.		
Mike Sklorski, Maj. (US)	The Big Pull (1962), TV	Unknown	Contemporary/Near Future
Mike Sklorski, Maj. (US)	First astronaut to pass through Van Allen radiation belt dies, then begins to merge with other people.		
Howard Judgen, Maj.	First Through Time (aka The Time Factor) (1962), novel	Unspecified (Note: At the conclusion of the novel Judgen mentions "... I may become the second or third man to make a circuit of the moon.")	Contemporary/Near Future
Howard Judgen, Maj.	Astronaut reassigned from the space program to take part in a time travel experiment.		
Caroline Baker, Maj.	The Adventures of Little Archie; The Missing Astronaut Mystery (1963), comic	Mercury-Atlas	1963
Caroline Baker, Maj.	Major Caroline Baker prepares to become the first female astronaut by making a brief solo spaceflight on a late Mercury-Atlas mission. After being launched successfully, Baker's re-entry is far off course; Soviet agents kidnap her when she splashes down.		
(USAF) Matt Crispin; Duke Dalmead; George Raccoli (USN) Bruce Blair; Rupert Meredith	A Flight of Chariots (1963), novel	Mercury; Columbia 12	Contemporary
(USAF) Matt Crispin; Duke Dalmead; George Raccoli (USN) Bruce Blair; Rupert Meredith	Fictional astronauts added to the original Mercury Seven four months after they were selected. Matt Crispin's flight in Columbia 12 ends with an emergency landing in the Gibson Desert when the oxygen system fails.		
Steve Crandon	The Outer Limits "The Man with the Power" (1963), TV	Unknown	Contemporary/Near Future
Steve Crandon	Astronaut recruited for telekinetic asteroid mining project.		
Joseph Reardon, Capt.	The Outer Limits "The Man Who Was Never Born" (1963), TV	Unknown	1963
Joseph Reardon, Capt.	Astronaut who travels through "time convulsion" in Earth orbit and finds himself on post-apocalyptic Earth in 2148.		
Sid Stein (Commander); Mike Seaman, Dr. (Communications Corporation [COMCORP]) (Engineer)	"The Trouble with Telstar" (1963), short story	Dyna-Soar; Nelly Bly	Contemporary/Near Future
Sid Stein (Commander); Mike Seaman, Dr. (Communications Corporation [COMCORP]) (Engineer)	Astronauts launched to carry out the first in-space repair of a malfunctioning satellite.		
Robert Gaines, Maj./ Robert Gaines, Col.	Twilight Zone "The Parallel" (1963), TV	Mercury? MX Ten (Phoebus Ten)/Astro Seven	Contemporary/Near Future
Robert Gaines, Maj./ Robert Gaines, Col.	Astronaut visits parallel universe where John F. Kennedy is not the U.S. President.		
John Jameson, Col.	The Amazing Spider-Man, Spider-Man Unlimited, Spider-Man 2 (1963–present), comics, TV, and film	Mercury, Apollo	Contemporary
John Jameson, Col.	A NASA astronaut who was afflicted with lycanthropy after discovering the Godstone, a magical ruby, on the Moon.		
Andy (no last name given)	Andy Astronaut (1968), picture book	Unknown (one-man capsule)	Contemporary
Andy (no last name given)	Profile of typical astronaut's career and spaceflight.		
Hal Brennan, Col. Michael Barnes, Dr.	Countdown (1970), novel	NASA: Hermes program	Early 1960s
Hal Brennan, Col. Michael Barnes, Dr.	Astronauts in follow-up program to Mercury, using one-man Hermes spacecraft launched by Titan rockets. Barnes is nearly killed on program's final mission due to oxygen system failure.		
Unnamed cosmonaut	Tell Her About It (1983), music video	Vostok?	July 31, 1963 (Note: Stated in an on-screen caption to be a Sunday. July 31, 1963, was in fact a Wednesday.)
Unnamed cosmonaut	Cosmonaut watches The Ed Sullivan Show from orbit.		
Unnamed cosmonaut	Top Secret "Codename: Cancer (The Crab)" (1987), role playing game	Vostok	1963
Unnamed cosmonaut	Soviet cosmonaut launched aboard a modified Vostok designed to be used as a nuclear bomber. Dies of oxygen starvation when his spacecraft is launched into a higher than planned orbit.		
Maurice Minnifield	Northern Exposure (1990–1995), TV	Mercury	Contemporary
Maurice Minnifield	Former NASA astronaut living in Alaska.		
Amerika Bomber/Silbervogel: Horst Reinhardt, (Note: Spelled "Reinhart" in short story.) Lt. (Luftwaffe) Lucky Linda: Rudy "Skid" Sloman, Lt. (Army Air Force) (Capt., USN, in short story) (Pilot); Joe McPherson (Backup pilot) (Note: Appears only in novel.) U.S. Space Force: Gerry Mander (Note: Appears only in novel.)	"Goddard's People" (a.k.a. "Operation Blue Horizon") (1991), short story V-S Day (2014), novel	Luftwaffe: Silbervogel ("Silver Bird") (A-9 Amerika Bomber in short story) United States Army Air Force: Operation Blue Horizon; X-1 (Lucky Linda)	January 19, 1942 – May 26, 1944 (Alternate History) / 1991 (Alternate History) (short story) August 20, 1941 – June 1, 1943 (Alternate History) / June 1, 2013 (Alternate History) (novel)
Amerika Bomber/Silbervogel: Horst Reinhardt, Lt. (Luftwaffe) Lucky Linda: Rudy "Skid" Sloman, Lt. (Army Air Force) (Capt., USN, in short story) (Pilot); Joe McPherson (Backup pilot) U.S. Space Force: Gerry Mander	Alternate history in which Nazi Germany and the US launch first crewed spaceflights in 1943 (1944 in short story). Mander, one of the engineers who builds Lucky Linda, later becomes an astronaut, serves on space station and travels to Moon. Set in same timeline as Steele's short story "John Harper Wilson" and novel The Tranquillity Alternative (q.v.).		
Alex; Dan; Carl (no last names given); Unnamed pilots	The Blue Ball (1995), play	Unknown	1960s
Alex; Dan; Carl (no last names given); Unnamed pilots	Early space program of unspecified country. Alex is the first man in space, with Dan as his backup. Dan and Carl experience emergency on subsequent mission.		
Charles Jones	Voyage (1996), novel	Mercury	Early 1960s (Alternate History)
Charles Jones	Second American to orbit Earth (on mission similar to Mercury-Atlas 7) in alternate history in which President Kennedy is wounded, and Jacqueline Kennedy killed, in November 1963 shooting.		
Project Mercury: Wayne, Col. (no first name given) Aspire 7: Theodore Harris, Col. Daedalus: Sullivan, Maj. (Commander); Carlton Powers (Co-Pilot); Ted Harris, Col. (Host Lecturer); Martin Reese (Journalist); Lil Vaughn (Passenger); Ty Chafey (Passenger); Barbara Chafey (Passenger)	The Outer Limits "Joyride" (1999), TV	Mercury: Aspire 7 Powers Industries: XR-141 (Daedalus) (Single-stage-to-orbit spaceplane)	September 16, 1963 2001
Project Mercury: Wayne, Col. (no first name given) Aspire 7: Theodore Harris, Col. Daedalus: Sullivan, Maj. (Commander); Carlton Powers (Co-Pilot); Ted Harris, Col. (Host Lecturer); Martin Reese (Journalist); Lil Vaughn (Passenger); Ty Chafey (Passenger); Barbara Chafey (Passenger)	Thirty-eight years after seeing strange lights in orbit on Mercury flight, Harris seizes chance to return to space aboard commercial spaceplane.		
Lloyd Macadam, Col. (AIT); Bricker (USSR)	Astronauts in Trouble: Space: 1959 (2000), graphic novel	Aerospace Intelligence Taskforce (AIT) (part of USAF)	1959
Lloyd Macadam, Col. (AIT); Bricker (USSR)	When Soviet agent Bricker commandeers secret US Moon rocket, Col. Macadam climbs aboard as rocket takes off to make sure that first man on Moon is American.		
Zipp Codwin, Col. (USAF) (NASA Administrator)	The Destroyer; The Wrong Stuff (2001), novel	Mercury	October 2001
Zipp Codwin, Col. (USAF) (NASA Administrator)	NASA Administrator is former astronaut who flew two Mercury missions.		
Katerina Vasiliyevna Taraskaya, Jr. Lt.	Red Moon (2001), novel	Vostok	c. 1963
Katerina Vasiliyevna Taraskaya, Jr. Lt.	A supporting character is the young and powerful Col. Katerina Borazova. Four years earlier, when merely Jr. Lt. Taraskaya, she had been launched into orbit after the Soviet premier personally selected her to be the first woman in space. Character is loosely based on Valentina Tereshkova.		
Alkilina Mikhailovna Chirikova, Jr. Lt.	Paragaea (2006), novel	Vostok	1964
Alkilina Mikhailovna Chirikova, Jr. Lt.	This novel begins in 1964, with the Soviet Union's second female cosmonaut Jr. Lt. Akilina Chirikova, already aboard Vostok 7, waiting nervously to be blasted into Earth orbit. To her relief, she is launched successfully, but after a couple of uneventful orbits, her ship enters a wormhole, and subsequently she lands in another world, a parallel Earth, called Paragaea.		
Carl Bell, Capt. (USAF)	Fallout 3 (2008), video game	United States Space Administration (USSA): Defiance 7 (Mercury-like)	May 5, 1961 (Alternate History)
Carl Bell, Capt. (USAF)	In this video game taking place in 2277, exactly 200 years after a nuclear war, the player can visit the Museum of Technology in the ruins of Washington D.C. The game (and the rest of the series) takes place in an alternate timeline that diverges from reality after World War II. One aspect of this timeline is that the United States was consistently ahead of the Soviet Union in the Space Race, unlike reality, where the US lagged behind it in the 1950s and early 1960s, although as in reality, the US still won the space race by beating the Soviets to the Moon and landing there in July 1969. As part of its exhibit on the Space Race, the museum details a slightly different version of Mercury-Redstone 3/Freedom 7 called Defiance 7, launched on May 5, 1961 (the day Freedom 7 was launched) by the United States Space Administration (USSA), the timeline's version of NASA, and piloted by US Air Force Captain Carl Bell. The flight lasted 12 minutes and 7 seconds and made one full revolution around the Earth. It is explicitly stated that Carl Bell was the first person in space (with no mention of Yuri Gagarin, the Soviet cosmonaut who holds the title in reality). Unlike Gagarin or Freedom 7's Alan Shepard (who was the first American in space), Bell did not survive his spaceflight, having died in a crash landing. Carl Bell's widow, Edwina Bell, donated Carl's space suit and skeleton to the museum and both are on display there. Both of the main Communist states of the time, the Soviet Union and China, disputed the United States' claim of sending a human into space first.		
Francine Barry	Children of Orion (2010), online novel	Mercury	September 1963 (Alternate History)
Francine Barry	In this alternative history novel female pilots are included in NASA's 1962 astronaut group. One of them is to fly a Mercury mission before that program ends and become the first woman in space. Francine Barry, a 31-year-old civilian test pilot, is selected for the task. The Soviets fly a woman cosmonaut first, but the confident Ms. Barry still rides into orbit on the final Mercury-Atlas, designed Serenity 7.		
Unnamed cosmonaut	Yulia (2010), song/music video	Vostok?	Unknown
Unnamed cosmonaut	Cosmonaut on solo mission is doomed by malfunction while his wife/girlfriend watches on television.		
Unnamed cosmonaut	The Last Cosmonaut (2011), short film	Vostok?	April 5, 1958
Unnamed cosmonaut	Cosmonaut on secret pre-Gagarin mission aborts reentry.		
Yelena Z. Kovalovski, Lt.	The Sea of Okhotsk (2011), novel	Vostok	November 1963
Yelena Z. Kovalovski, Lt.	Fantasy novel in which veteran Soviet Air Force flight instructor Lt. Yelena Kovalovski becomes the second woman in space, aboard Vostok 7.		
Natalya Dmitrievna Kubasova, Lt.	Sparrow's Flight (2011), novel	Vostok	September 1960
Natalya Dmitrievna Kubasova, Lt.	In September 1960, the Soviet Union is ready to launch the first human into space. A female Soviet Air Force pilot, Lt. Natalya Kubasova, is launched in a Vostok capsule, but just after reaching orbit, the capsule malfunctions and the cosmonaut plunges to Earth, landing in the American mid-West.		
Arthur Whitman	Waltz for One (2012), short film	Whitman Enterprises: Omega 7 (Mercury-like)	1960s
Arthur Whitman	"Wealthy eccentric" Whitman attempts to set solo space endurance record.		
Unnamed American astronaut	Hoax Hunters Issue Nº.0 (2013), online comic	Mercury	1961 and Contemporary
Unnamed American astronaut	Astronaut launched into orbit prior to John Glenn to investigate Soviet space activity. He and the crow accidentally launched with him are bizarrely affected when exposed to Zero-point energy. (Note: It is unclear if the flight is a suborbital flight or a full orbit. Dialog implies a full orbit, but the illustration shows a Redstone, rather than an Atlas.)		
Tatyana Fedorova, Capt. Alexander Mikhailov, Maj.	Into the Silent Sea (2013), short film	Vostok 5B	1963
Tatyana Fedorova, Capt. Alexander Mikhailov, Maj.	In early 1963, the Politburo presses leaders of the space program to put Captain Fedorova, trainee cosmonaut and daughter of a senior Party official, into space on the Vostok 5B mission. When launch is brought forward, the risks of a mission failure increase. Fedorova is deemed too well-connected to be risked, so is replaced by Mikhailov. After a successful launch, he becomes stranded in orbit, and losing contact with his base, his final contact with Earth is with an Italian radio operator.		
Unnamed cosmonaut	The Landing (2013), short film	Vostok	August 6, 1960 – April 12, 1961 / Contemporary
Unnamed cosmonaut	First Soviet in space is killed by American farmer after crash landing.		
Liza Olegovna Klubnikova, Jr. Lt.	Notte Dell’Avvenire (2013), Italian language novel	Vostok 7	1963
Liza Olegovna Klubnikova, Jr. Lt.	This novel spans the period from 1960 to 1989. After being plucked from a parachute club for selection as a cosmonaut, Klubnikova is nominated to go into space on Vostok 7, in 1963. Her belief in the Soviet system, and what she calls 'the Dream', gives her reassurance that the dangerous mission will be a success. However, during launch, she suffers hallucinations, due to oxygen starvation and anxiety, and loses contact with Earth. Three days later, she survives a crash landing, but is spirited away after her spaceflight and forced to present a false portrayal of her mission for propaganda purposes. Her belief in the Soviet system is shaken, and she is spirited away to live in obscurity in Berlin. In 1989, with the Soviet Union crumbling, she finally breaks her silence about her trip into space.		
Unnamed cosmonaut	Kosmonauta (2014), short film	Vostok	May 23, 1961
Unnamed cosmonaut	Female lost cosmonaut featured in allegedly authentic recording by Judica-Cordiglia brothers.		
Alexei (no last name given)	Ad Astra (2016), short film	Vostok	c. early 1960s
Alexei (no last name given)	Cosmonaut who experiences emergency prior to reentry.		
Vladimir Felixovich Gogol	Blue Darker Than Black (2016), novel	Vostok	Early 1960s
Vladimir Felixovich Gogol	Cosmonaut who flew three secret ten-day military missions concurrent with publicly acknowledged Vostok program. In 1964, at the end of his third flight, he crash-landed in China and spent 40 months among Mongolian nomads.		
Guy Taylor, Cmdr.	Capsule (2016), film	Hermes	December 4, 1959
Guy Taylor, Cmdr.	British pilot on secret Earth-orbital mission launched from Woomera.		
Oliver Grier, Cmdr.	Anomaly (2019), short film	NASA; Anomaly Program: Anomaly 1 (Mercury-like)	Late 1960s (through December)
Oliver Grier, Cmdr.	Astronaut on mission to launch space telescope.		
Unnamed astronaut	Infinity 7 (2019), short film	Mercury: Infinity 7	Early 1960s
Unnamed astronaut	Mercury astronaut stranded in orbit due to electrical malfunction and retrofire failure.		
William Florescu, Cmd.	The Astronaut of God (2020), film	United States: US Genesis 1491 (Mercury-like)	January 2, 1962
William Florescu, Cmd.	Romanian American astronaut on solo Earth-orbital mission to investigate the possible presence of God. Florescu is the fifth human in space.		
Sacha; Grishna; Alina Vitat' 4: Unnamed cosmonaut	"Orbit" (2020), short story	Vostok?: Vitat' 4	c. 1960
Sacha; Grishna; Alina Vitat' 4: Unnamed cosmonaut	Third man in space reflects on how he, like his predecessors, will be erased from history.		
