= List of fictional astronauts (Project Gemini era) =

Lists of fictional astronauts
Early period	Project Mercury	Project Gemini
Project Apollo	1975–1989	1990–1999
2000–2009	2010–2029	Moon
Inner Solar System	Outer Solar System	Other
Far future

The following is a list of fictional astronauts from the era of Project Gemini and the Voskhod programme, during the early "Golden Age" of space travel.

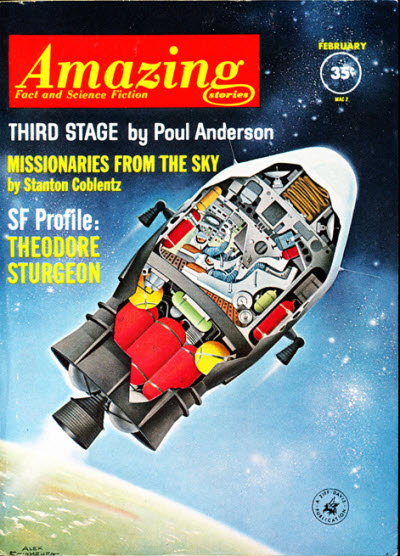
Astronauts Holt and Swanberg aboard Aeolus spacecraft in "Third Stage" (1962 short story by Poul Anderson)

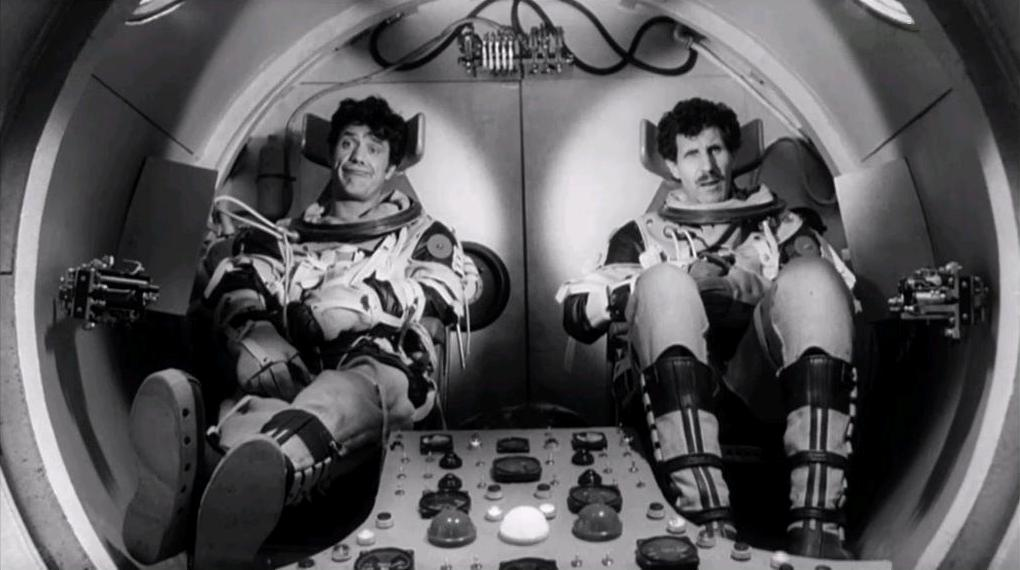
Franco and Ciccio in space in 002 Operazione Luna (1965 film)

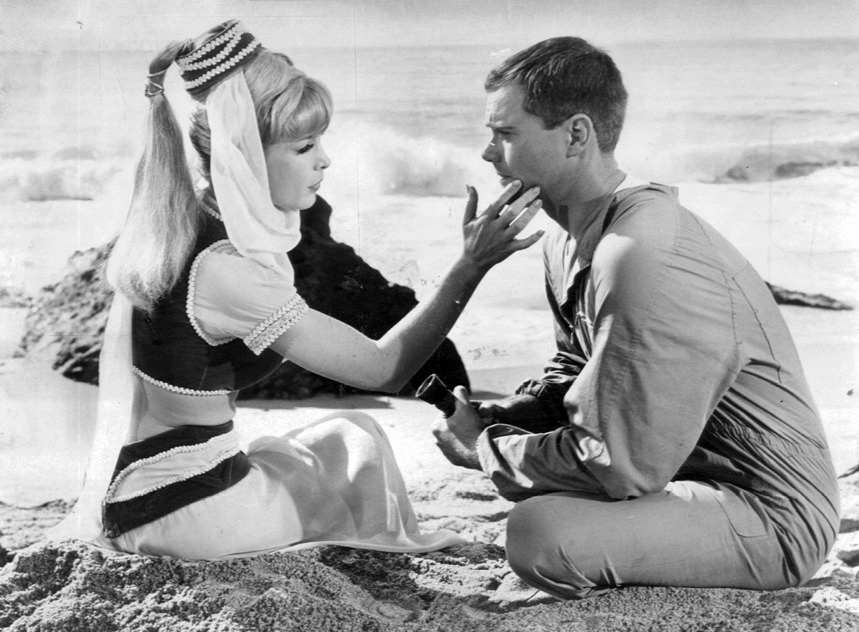
Capt. Tony Nelson (actor Larry Hagman) meets a mysterious woman in the first episode of I Dream of Jeannie (TV series)

== Project Gemini era ==
Name(s)	Appeared in	Program / Mission / Spacecraft	Fictional date
Gemini (1964–1966)
Dan Cooper, Capt. (RCAF); Nadia Kalinskaya, Lt. (Soviet Air Force); Jacques Souris, Lt. (French Air Force); Sonya Gombinski, Capt. (Polish Air Force)	SOS dans l'espace, Trois Cosmonautes, Apollo appelle Soyouz and other Tintin magazine stories (1957–69), comics	Gemini XIII and others	Contemporary
Dan Cooper, Capt. (RCAF); Nadia Kalinskaya, Lt. (Soviet Air Force); Jacques Souris, Lt. (French Air Force); Sonya Gombinski, Capt. (Polish Air Force)	Comic book series by Albert Weinberg. Cooper, Souris and Kalinskaya all complete solo spaceflights in Trois Cosmonautes. Kalinskaya and Gombinski (Poland's first cosmonaut) make an all-female Soyuz flight in Apollo appelle Soyouz.		
Walter Frisbee	N/A (Early 1960s)	Gemini	Contemporary
Walter Frisbee	Fictitious tenth member of NASA Astronaut Group 2 invented by Pete Conrad and Jim Lovell as a prank on reporters. Frisbee, son of a Romanian nobleman, spent his time undergoing secret training.		
James Holt (Pilot); William Swanberg (Electronician)	"Third Stage" (1962), short story	United States: Aeolus rocket	Near Future (after 1963)
James Holt (Pilot); William Swanberg (Electronician)	Astronauts on mission into Van Allen belt to test radiation screen are stranded in orbit. Three-stage Aeolus rocket is launched from Cape Canaveral.		
Mercury 7: Richard J. Pruett, Maj. (USAF) Gemini: Jim Dougherty (USAF) Vostok IX: Andrei Yakovlev, Col.	Marooned (1964), novel	Mercury 7 (Mercury); Gemini (Gemini); Vostok IX (Vostok)	July 1964
Mercury 7: Richard J. Pruett, Maj. (USAF) Gemini: Jim Dougherty (USAF) Vostok IX: Andrei Yakovlev, Col.	NASA astronaut on 7th Mercury flight (MA-10) trapped in orbit due to no retrofire; boilerplate Gemini (GT-2) launched to rescue; Russian cosmonaut also rendezvous. Novel also mentions docking of Vostok VII and VIII and names GT-3 crew as Shepard and Masters.		
Paradowsky, Col. Borovin, Maj. Franco; Ciccio	002 Operazione Luna (1965), film	Voskhod?	Contemporary
Paradowsky, Col. Borovin, Maj. Franco; Ciccio	When cosmonauts Paradowsky and Borovin disappear in space, Italian criminals Franco and Ciccio, their doubles, are kidnapped and launched into space to cover up the mission's apparent failure.		
Henry Olsen (Pilot)	"Una cuerda de nylon y oro" (aka "A Cord Made of Nylon and Gold") (1965), short story	Gemini (Gemini 5?)	August 1965 – Near Future
Henry Olsen (Pilot)	Astronaut deliberately cuts himself loose from Gemini spacecraft commanded by James McDivitt, then witnesses nuclear holocaust on Earth from orbit.		
Igor; Ivan	Gilligan's Island; Nyet, Nyet, Not Yet (1965), TV	Voskhod?	Contemporary
Igor; Ivan	Cosmonauts who land on Gilligan's isle.		
NASA: Stardust I: Anthony Nelson, Capt./Maj. (USAF) Roger Healey, Capt./Maj. Leslie "Les" Wingate, Cmdr. (Command Pilot/LMP); Pete Conway, Lt. (USNR); Cortwright (no first name given); Rich Ross, Cmdr. Biff "Jetstream" Jellico, Maj. (USAF) USSR: Sonya Tiomkin, Maj. Posnovsky, Maj. Gregorian, Maj.	I Dream of Jeannie (1965–70), TV	Stardust I, Gemini, Project Alpha, Apollo	Contemporary
NASA: Stardust I: Anthony Nelson, Capt./Maj. (USAF) Roger Healey, Capt./Maj. Leslie "Les" Wingate, Cmdr. (Command Pilot/LMP); Pete Conway, Lt. (USNR); Cortwright (no first name given); Rich Ross, Cmdr. Biff "Jetstream" Jellico, Maj. (USAF) USSR: Sonya Tiomkin, Maj. Posnovsky, Maj. Gregorian, Maj.	Career NASA astronauts. Nelson, Healey and Wingate orbit the Moon on Apollo 14 in the episode "Around the World in 80 Blinks" (1969) and are in quarantine after Moon mission in "The Solid Gold Jeannie" (1970). Other astronauts and cosmonauts appear in the episodes "The Lady in the Bottle" (1965), "Jeannie and the Marriage Caper" (1965), "Russian Roulette" (1965), "Tomorrow Is Not Another Day" (1968), "My Sister, the Home Wrecker" (1969) and "Never Put a Genie on a Budget" (1969).		
Frank Douglas	Monster a Go-Go (a.k.a. Terror at Halfday) (1965), film	United States: Space Agency (two-man capsule)	Contemporary
Frank Douglas	Astronaut Douglas is seemingly transformed into radioactive monster.		
Unnamed astronaut	The Avengers; Man-Eater of Surrey Green (1966), TV	Unknown; one-man capsule	Contemporary
Unnamed astronaut	British astronaut dies in orbit; capsule re-enters following collision with giant alien plant.		
Zeus IV: Glyn Williams, Col. Dan "Bluey" Schultz, Maj. Zeus V: Terry Cutler, Lt.	Doctor Who; The Tenth Planet (1966), TV (1976 novel)	International Space Command (ISC): Zeus IV; Zeus V	December 1986 (2000 in novel)
Zeus IV: Glyn Williams, Col. Dan "Bluey" Schultz, Maj. Zeus V: Terry Cutler, Lt.	On a routine atmospheric survey mission, the orbit of Zeus IV is disrupted by the gravitational pull of the planet Mondas as it passes close to Earth. Zeus V attempts a rescue.		
Mac MacKenzie, Capt. Hector "Hec" Canfield, Lt.	It's About Time (1966–67), TV	NASA: Scorpio	Contemporary
Mac MacKenzie, Capt. Hector "Hec" Canfield, Lt.	Sitcom about astronauts who travel back in time and meet caveman family.		
Gregory Schuster, Maj. Wayne Morris, Maj. Neil Danvers-Marshal, Prof.	Skyprobe (1966), novel	Unknown, Skyprobe IV	Near future
Gregory Schuster, Maj. Wayne Morris, Maj. Neil Danvers-Marshal, Prof.	Astronauts sent on a record-breaking, high Earth orbit mission.		
Jennings, Maj. (Pilot) (no first name given); Bob Wyart (Co-Pilot)	"Under the Wide and Starry Sky..." (1966), short story	Gemini, GT-9	Contemporary
Jennings, Maj. (Pilot) (no first name given); Bob Wyart (Co-Pilot)	Fictional Gemini IX crew who find themselves in serious trouble during the last hours of their two-week mission. Plot-line apparently based on the original Gemini IX flight plan.		
Scorpio 6: Sol Tobias (Command Pilot); Ryan (Pilot) (no first name given)	Gilligan's Island; Splashdown (1967), TV	Scorpio 6 Scorpio E-X-1	Contemporary
Scorpio 6: Sol Tobias (Command Pilot); Ryan (Pilot) (no first name given)	NASA astronauts on mission to rendezvous with unmanned Scorpio E-X-1 capsule and transfer Tobias to it.		
Voskhod: Lev Alexandrovich Barkagan; Igil Postovoiit; Nikolai Lermontov Gemini XIII: Rance Allenby, Col. (USAF) (Command Pilot); Gene Stanley (USN) (Pilot)	No Man's World (1967), novel	Voskhod Gemini XIII	Late 1964 1960s
Voskhod: Lev Alexandrovich Barkagan; Igil Postovoiit; Nikolai Lermontov Gemini XIII: Rance Allenby, Col. (USAF) (Command Pilot); Gene Stanley (USN) (Pilot)	Voskhod cosmonauts' three-day mission in Earth orbit is followed by twenty-seven day stay in vacuum chamber simulating lunar surface. Barkagan was one of the second group of cosmonauts, chosen in 1961. Final Gemini mission (Agena rendezvous and docking, simulating Apollo CSM/LM docking) nearly ends in disaster after meteor strike. Allenby was one of a 16-man astronaut group chosen in 1964.		
Jupiter XVI: Chris (last name not given); Unnamed US astronaut Voskhod (?): Two unnamed cosmonauts Bird 1: Two unnamed Osato astronauts Jupiter XVII: Two unnamed US astronauts	You Only Live Twice (1967), film	Jupiter XVI (Gemini) Unnamed Soviet capsule (Voskhod?) Bird 1 (reusable capsule) Jupiter XVII (Gemini)	Contemporary
Jupiter XVI: Chris (last name not given); Unnamed US astronaut Voskhod (?): Two unnamed cosmonauts Bird 1: Two unnamed Osato astronauts Jupiter XVII: Two unnamed US astronauts	Presumed NASA and Soviet Union crews captured by Osato Chemicals (SPECTRE) spacecraft. Bird 1 uses expendable booster for launch; capsule capable of vertical pin-point landing like DC-X. Chris killed at capture due to EVA. Cosmonauts captured next. Capture of Jupiter XVII and probable outbreak of World War III prevented by James Bond.		
Voskhod 3: Vladimir Kostrov, Maj. Andrei Subbotin, Maj. Aurora 1: Vladimir Kostrov, Maj. Sergei Nofikov, Capt. Zhenia Svetlova, Sen. Lt. Dawn 1: Andrei Gorolev, Capt.	Cosmonauts on the Earth (Космонавты живут на Земле) (1968), Russian-language novel	Voskhod 3 (Voskhod) Aurora 1 (Soyuz) Dawn 1 (Zond)	Contemporary
Voskhod 3: Vladimir Kostrov, Maj. Andrei Subbotin, Maj. Aurora 1: Vladimir Kostrov, Maj. Sergei Nofikov, Capt. Zhenia Svetlova, Sen. Lt. Dawn 1: Andrei Gorolev, Capt.	Semi-fictional work follows the lives and missions of nine cosmonauts recruited to fly the space missions which follow Vostok and Voskhod in period 1965–67. Seven ex-Soviet Air Force Pilots and two female champion skydivers train to fly on the next generation of Soviet rockets. "Aurora" and "Dawn" are analogous to Soyuz and Zond spacecraft of the real Soviet programme. Capt. Gorelov becomes the first man to fly around the Moon, while Sen. Lt. Svetlova replaces her close friend Marina Berzhenkova in the "Aurora" capsule at the last moment to become the first woman to make a spacewalk.		
Gemini: Stubby Dolan MOL: Michael Stevens Harder; George Ormsbee	Four Came Back (1968), novel	NASA: Gemini United States Air Force: Gemini-B/Manned Orbiting Laboratory (MOL)	1960s Late 1970
Gemini: Stubby Dolan MOL: Michael Stevens Harder; George Ormsbee	Dolan flew Agena rendezvous on late Gemini mission; Harder and Ormsbee flew first MOL mission. Harder previously flew X-15 into space.		
Bill Stevens (Note: Astronaut, CAPCOM for the Gemini XII-A mission.) Gemini XII-A; Prime Crew: Stephen Pitt, Lt. Cmdr. (Note: Transferred to the Apollo Program and promoted to Commander following the mission.) (USN); Robert "Roberto" Gauss, Dr. (Note: Pseudonym, real name is Dr. Samuel Henry Stonebreaker.); Backup crew: Lewis Hammill, Maj. (USAF); Daniel Golding, Capt. (USMC) Voskhod: Two unnamed cosmonauts	Death of a Cosmonaut (aka Autopsy for a Cosmonaut) (1969), novel	Gemini XII-A Voskhod	September 1966 – June 1967
Bill Stevens Gemini XII-A; Prime Crew: Stephen Pitt, Lt. Cmdr. (USN); Robert "Roberto" Gauss, Dr. Backup crew: Lewis Hammill, Maj. (USAF); Daniel Golding, Capt. (USMC) Voskhod: Two unnamed cosmonauts	Crew of a Gemini mission which makes a clandestine rendezvous with a failed Voskhod to carry out an autopsy of the cosmonauts.		
Charles "Hickory" Lee, Maj. (US Army); Timothy Bell; Harry Jensen, Capt. (USAF); Edward Cater, Maj. (USAF) Gemini XIII: Randolph Claggett, Maj. (USMC) (Command Pilot); John Pope, Cmdr. (USN) (Pilot) Apollo 18: Randy Claggett (CDR); John Pope (CMP); Paul Linley (LMP)	Space (1982), novel; James A. Michener's Space (1985), TV	Gemini XIII Apollo 18; Altair (CSM)/Luna (LM)	1960s – 1970s
Charles "Hickory" Lee, Maj. (US Army); Timothy Bell; Harry Jensen, Capt. (USAF); Edward Cater, Maj. (USAF) Gemini XIII: Randolph Claggett, Maj. (USMC) (Command Pilot); John Pope, Cmdr. (USN) (Pilot) Apollo 18: Randy Claggett (CDR); John Pope (CMP); Paul Linley (LMP)	NASA astronauts in James Michener's fictionalized account of the early years of the space program and the TV miniseries made from it.		
Alexander Alexandrovich "Sasha" Oryolin, Col. (Pilot); Konstantine K. "Kostya" Strogolshikov, Col.	Peter Nevsky and the True Story of the Russian Moon Landing (1993), novel	Voskhod 2	1965
Alexander Alexandrovich "Sasha" Oryolin, Col. (Pilot); Konstantine K. "Kostya" Strogolshikov, Col.	First spacewalk mission, similar to the real Voskhod 2; cosmonauts survive crash landing in Ural Mountains.		
Marcus Aurelius Belt, Lt. Col.	The X-Files; Space (1993), TV	Gemini VIII	November or December 1993 (flashback to c. 1966)
Marcus Aurelius Belt, Lt. Col.	Former NASA astronaut who is possessed by a creature from outer space.		
Gary "Gator" Augatreux (USAF) (Commander); Ty Yount, Maj. (USAF); Unnamed backup	Dark Skies; Mercury Rising (1996), TV	Midnight Wing: Gemini (prototype); Saturn	October 21, 1962 January 30 – February 2, 1964
Gary "Gator" Augatreux (USAF) (Commander); Ty Yount, Maj. (USAF); Unnamed backup	Astronauts on black ops missions for US military. Augatreux and Yount experience missing time while intercepting alien spacecraft on October 1962 mission launched into polar orbit from Vandenberg Air Force Base. February 1964 mission relays data from Ranger 6.		
Vladimir Pavlovich Viktorenko; Unnamed cosmonaut	Voyage (1996), novel	Voskhod 3	1966 (Alternate History)
Vladimir Pavlovich Viktorenko; Unnamed cosmonaut	First flight of alternate history cosmonaut Viktorenko, who later takes part in Moonlab/Soyuz mission.		
Carl Ackland, Maj. (Command Pilot); Adam Banton, Maj. (Pilot)	Airlock, or How to Say Goodbye in Space (2007), short film	NASA: Gemini	December 24, 1976
Carl Ackland, Maj. (Command Pilot); Adam Banton, Maj. (Pilot)	Astronauts facing death in space.		
Voskhod 4: Fabiano Dmietrivich Damianov, Maj. Larissa Timofyevna Damianova, Capt.	Voskhod 4 (2010), novella	Voskhod 4 (Voskhod)	1965
Voskhod 4: Fabiano Dmietrivich Damianov, Maj. Larissa Timofyevna Damianova, Capt.	Cosmonauts launched on a 14-day Voskhod mission in 1965 are believed lost when their launch vehicle explodes high above Siberia.		
Dmitri Selonovich	Doctor Who "Space Oddity" (2013), comic strip	Vostok 11 (Vostok)	1965
Dmitri Selonovich	Cosmonaut killed by Vashta Nerada while making first human spacewalk on classified military mission.		
USSR: Vasily (no last name given) L3: Raisa Zaslavskaya; Unnamed copilot (Soviet Air Force) Gemini 17: Malachi "Mal" Washington (USN); Vic Hemshaw (Copilot)	"Gemini XVII" (2013), novelette	Soviet Union: L3 (launched with N1 booster) NASA: Gemini 17 (Advanced Gemini)	c. December 1968 (Alternate History) / c. 1978 (Alternate History)
USSR: Vasily (no last name given) L3: Raisa Zaslavskaya; Unnamed copilot (Soviet Air Force) Gemini 17: Malachi "Mal" Washington (USN); Vic Hemshaw (Copilot)	After both of their copilots die, Washington and Zaslavskaya must work together to return to Earth from lunar orbit. Story set in alternate history in which the Bay of Pigs Invasion led US into war in Cuba, and John F. Kennedy survived 1963 assassination attempt. Gemini is inserted into translunar trajectory by Chiron booster (Agena mated to Centaur). Vasily was Zaslavskaya's husband; Hemshaw also flew on earlier Gemini mission. Washington later commands Moon mission to Mare Nectaris and is named chief test pilot for Space Shuttle to service Skylabs One through Six. Zaslavskaya becomes a colonel in the Israeli Air Force and joins shuttle project.		
Frank Conner	Rocket Men (2013), short film	Project Gemini Sigma (homemade rocket)	Contemporary
Frank Conner	Retired astronaut Conner builds homemade rocket with fired planetarium director. Conner was assigned to Gemini 11 but broke his arm and was replaced by Dick Gordon.		
Robert Braddock	Rocketship (2013), short film	Project Gemini	1965 / Contemporary
Robert Braddock	Astronaut who was assigned as command pilot of Gemini 9, but never flew in space due to heart problem.		
Blue Gemini: Tim Agnew, Maj. Crew One: Andrew M. "Drew" Carson, Maj. (Command Pilot); Scott Ernst Ourecky, Maj. (Pilot) Crew Two: Tom "Big Head" Howard (Command Pilot); Pete "Squeaky" Riddle, Maj. (Pilot) Crew Three: Parch Jackson, Maj. (Command Pilot); Mike Sigler (Pilot) MOL: Jeff McKnight, Cmdr. (USN); Three unnamed astronauts (USN) First MOL mission: Chris Cowin, Cmdr. (USN) (Command Pilot); Edward Russo, Lt. Col. (USAF) (Pilot) Kochevnik: Vladimir Felixovich Gogol, Lt. Col. (operational nickname Kochevnik ["Nomad"]) (Commander); Pavel Dmitriyevich Vasilyev, Maj. (Soviet Air Force) (First Flight Engineer); Petr Mikhailovich Travkin, Maj. (Soviet Air Force) (Second Flight Engineer) Krepost: Pavel Dmitriyevich Vasilyev, Maj. (Commander); Petr Mikhailovich Travkin, Maj. Kochevnik: Vladimir Felixovich Gogol, Lt. Col. Space Shuttle: Andrew Carson Ourecky (NASA/USAF)	Blue Gemini (2015), Blue Darker Than Black (2016), Pale Blue (2016), novels	United States Air Force; Blue Gemini: Gemini-Interceptor (Gemini-I) United States Navy: Manned Orbiting Laboratory (MOL); Gemini-B Soviet Union: Kochevnik ("Nomad") (Soyuz); Krepost ("Fortified outpost") (Military space station)/Soyuz; Kochevnik ("Nomad") (Soyuz) Space Shuttle	April 25, 1966 – June 19, 1969 (Blue Gemini) July 17, 1969 – August 27, 1972 (Blue Darker Than Black) August 29, 1972 – June 7, 1974 / Contemporary (Pale Blue)
Blue Gemini program is secretly reactivated to inspect and disable Soviet satellites. Gemini-Is are launched from Johnston Island and touch down on land using paraglider. Crew Two launches on test flight (Mission One) on February 25, 1969; Crew One flies first operational mission (Mission Two) June 13–14, 1969 (Blue Gemini). Crew One flies Mission Three September 9–11, 1969, and Mission Four March 10–13, 1970 (crash-landing in Haiti). Crew Three flies Missions Five and Six in June and September 1970; Crew One flies Missions Seven through Ten from January 1971 to January 1972. Soyuz Kochevnik flies secret mission to test military space station equipment from May 8 to c. May 18, 1970. MOL project is transferred from Air Force to Navy after its official cancellation; Cowin and Russo fly first MOL mission July–August 1972. Blue Gemini Crew One flies Mission Eleven (rescue mission to MOL) August 17–18, 1972 (Blue Darker Than Black). Nuclear-armed Krepost occupied from September 14 – October 24, 1972. Blue Gemini Crew One flies Mission Twelve (to Krepost) October 22–24, 1972 (launched from Cape Kennedy Air Force Station). Second Soyuz Kochevnik launched to relieve Krepost on October 23, 1972 (Pale Blue).
Gemini 5: Jim Harrison, Capt. (USAF) (Backup Commander)	The Last Pilot (2015), novel	NASA: X-15; Project Gemini	October 1947 – December 24, 1968
Gemini 5: Jim Harrison, Capt. (USAF) (Backup Commander)	Air Force test pilot selected as member of NASA Astronaut Group 2. Harrison is assigned as prime commander of Gemini 8, but is pulled from mission due to personal issues.		
Andrei, (Note: Last name spoken but difficult to hear.) Col. (Soviet Air Forces)	Voskhod (2015), short film	Voskhod 3	1966 (November – December)
Andrei, Col. (Soviet Air Forces)	Cosmonaut stranded in orbit contacts American amateur radio operator.		
Silk; Hamaker (no first names given)	Goldie Vance No. 8 (2016), comic book	Unknown (Gemini?)	Early 1960s (prior to August 11, 1962 (Note: Date storyline begins in Goldie Vance No. 5.))
Silk; Hamaker (no first names given)	Astronauts who shared spacesuit after spacecraft developed leak in orbit. Referenced only.		
