= Encounter with Tiber =

1996 novel by John Barnes

Encounter With Tiber
- First edition
- Author: Buzz Aldrin; John Barnes
- Language: English
- Genre: Science fiction
- Publisher: Warner Books
- Publication date: 1996
- Publication place: United States
- Media type: Paperback
- Pages: 560
- ISBN: 0-340-62451-5
- OCLC: 420152165

Encounter With Tiber (ISBN 0-340-62451-5) is a 1996 science fiction novel written by former astronaut Buzz Aldrin and science fiction writer John Barnes. A working title, used on some advance covers for the British edition, was The Tides of Tiber.

== Plot summary ==
Evidence is found of an intelligent alien species who visited the Earth long ago and left an encyclopedia with the collected knowledge of their culture. The story is told from the point of view of a human historian on a star ship on the way to Alpha Centauri (the aliens' home star) who is using the time in transit to translate two alien books and to write a history of how humans gained access to the aliens' knowledge.

9000 years ago the alien society in the Alpha Centauri system was under threat of cosmic bombardment. Their only hope to survive was to explore and colonize nearby space. On 21st century Earth, astronauts find artifacts left by this civilization and wonder who they were.

The narrator is a historian who is part of a mission to the Alpha Centauri system, the home system of the aliens. As all crew members were required to bring several projects to work on, due to the decades long nature of the mission, she spends her time writing biographies of several family members who were closely involved in the acquisition of a repository of the aliens' knowledge. As another project, she translates two autobiographies by the aliens who had visited the Solar System over 9000 years earlier.
