= List of fictional astronauts (miscellaneous futuristic activities) =

Lists of fictional astronauts
Early period	Project Mercury	Project Gemini
Project Apollo	1975–1989	1990–1999
2000–2009	2010–2029	Moon
Inner Solar System	Outer Solar System	Other
Far future

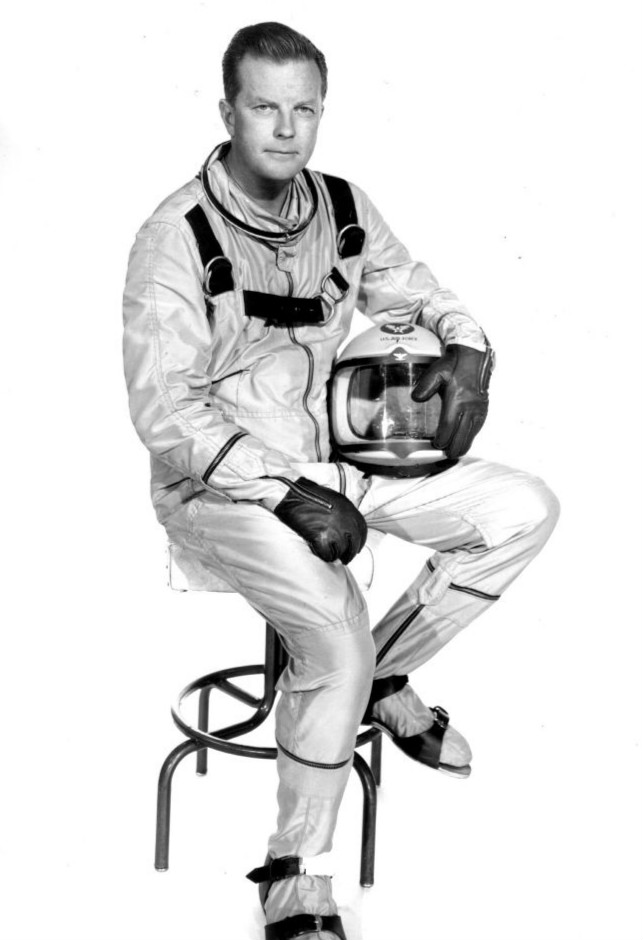
Actor William Lundigan as Col. Edward McCauley, Men into Space (TV series)

The following is a list of fictional astronauts on missions to deflect asteroids and comets which pose a threat to Earth, as well as performing other miscellaneous feats of space exploration not yet achieved.

== Asteroid/comet deflection ==
Name(s)	Appeared in	Program / Mission / Spacecraft	Fictional date
Edward McCauley, Col. Stacy Croydon, Dr. (Scientist); Emory, Maj. Draper, Capt. (no first names given for last two)	Men into Space (a.k.a. Space Challenge); Asteroid (1959), TV	United States Air Force: Skyra mission	c. 1970–1980
Edward McCauley, Col. Stacy Croydon, Dr. (Scientist); Emory, Maj. Draper, Capt. (no first names given for last two)	Astronauts on mission to evaluate asteroid Skyra as possible location for space station, or, if necessary, to destroy it.		
Jack Rankin (Commander); Vince Elliott (Station Commander); Lisa "Lizzie" Benson, Dr. (Physician); Martin, Capt. Hans Halvorsen, Dr. (Space consultant); Michaels (assistant to Halvorsen); Curtis, Lt. Dreger, Lt. Morris, Lt. Scott, Sgt. Unnamed personnel	The Green Slime (a.k.a. Battle beyond the Stars) (1968), film	U.N.S.C.: Space Station Gamma 3 Unnamed rocket Three support cruisers	Future
Jack Rankin (Commander); Vince Elliott (Station Commander); Lisa "Lizzie" Benson, Dr. (Physician); Martin, Capt. Hans Halvorsen, Dr. (Space consultant); Michaels (assistant to Halvorsen); Curtis, Lt. Dreger, Lt. Morris, Lt. Scott, Sgt. Unnamed personnel	Mission to destroy asteroid on collision course with Earth results in infestation of space station by tentacled creatures.		
Unnamed CSM/LM: Thomas Alvar Nicols, Maj. Van Druten; Riley (first names not given) Enterprise: Richard Bradford Ridge, Maj. (Commander); David Priestly (Co-Pilot); Marvin Leisen (Navigator); Jim O'Toole; Archie Carfagno Orpheus: Thomas Alvar Nicols, Maj. (Co-Pilot); Richard Bradford Ridge, Maj. (Pilot)	The Hermes Fall (1978), novel	Apollo; Unnamed CSM/LM; Orpheus (CSM) Space Shuttle; Enterprise	August 20–25, 1980
Unnamed CSM/LM: Thomas Alvar Nicols, Maj. Van Druten; Riley (first names not given) Enterprise: Richard Bradford Ridge, Maj. (Commander); David Priestly (Co-Pilot); Marvin Leisen (Navigator); Jim O'Toole; Archie Carfagno Orpheus: Thomas Alvar Nicols, Maj. (Co-Pilot); Richard Bradford Ridge, Maj. (Pilot)	A NASA moonflight veteran and the commander of the first Space Shuttle mission are sent on a desperate mission to prevent the asteroid Hermes crashing into the Earth.		
Floyd Hartwell; Andrew Bukowski, Capt. (Air Force Astronaut Wing); Leonard Dmetriev (USSR); Unnamed Chinese astronaut	Impact! (1979), novel	Argonaut XX	Contemporary?
Floyd Hartwell; Andrew Bukowski, Capt. (Air Force Astronaut Wing); Leonard Dmetriev (USSR); Unnamed Chinese astronaut	International astronauts on a mission to prevent an asteroid impacting Earth.		
Marlena Glenn, Lt. Spaceplane: Mark Blaze, Col. (Commander); Andrea Steele, Maj.	He-Man and the Masters of the Universe; Visitors From Earth (1984), TV	Spaceplane	Future
Marlena Glenn, Lt. Spaceplane: Mark Blaze, Col. (Commander); Andrea Steele, Maj.	Astronauts on mission to destroy "magnetic meteor" accidentally travel through wormhole to Eternia. Lt. Glenn had previously disappeared and become Queen of Eternia.		
NASA: Murasaki; Terrence "the Trance"; Turginson; Woodside Atlantis: Boston "Boz" Low (Commander); Ken Borden (Copilot); Cora Miles (Mission Specialist); Ludger Brink, Prof. (EEC) (Mission Specialist); Maggie Robbins (Journalist)	The Dig (1995), video game/novel	Space Shuttle; Atlantis	Near Future
NASA: Murasaki; Terrence "the Trance"; Turginson; Woodside Atlantis: Boston "Boz" Low (Commander); Ken Borden (Copilot); Cora Miles (Mission Specialist); Ludger Brink, Prof. (EEC) (Mission Specialist); Maggie Robbins (Journalist)	Mission to stabilize orbit of mysterious asteroid. Low is a five-time shuttle veteran who made emergency landing aboard Enterprise. Scientist Brink spent months aboard space station Mir II. (Note: An earlier version of the game by Brian Moriarty featured an additional character named Toshi Olema, a paying passenger on the mission.)		
Dana Shaw, Dr. (Scientist); Ryan (Boss) (no first name given); Samantha "Nuke-'em" Rogers (Explosives specialist); Potter (Mechanic) (no first name given) Alpha crew: Cody Harrison (Driller); Ben Banton (Drill controller) Beta crew: Luke Harrison (Driller); Archer (Drill controller) (no first name given)	Within the Rock (1996), TV movie	Nexecon Corporation: Mining platform Jettison pod	2019
Dana Shaw, Dr. (Scientist); Ryan (Boss) (no first name given); Samantha "Nuke-'em" Rogers (Explosives specialist); Potter (Mechanic) (no first name given) Alpha crew: Cody Harrison (Driller); Ben Banton (Drill controller) Beta crew: Luke Harrison (Driller); Archer (Drill controller) (no first name given)	Space miners on a mission to deflect Galileo's Child, a rogue moon on a collision course with Earth, discover a hostile alien creature. Cody and Luke Harrison are brothers.		
Atlantis crew: William Sharp, Col. (CMR); Jennifer Watts (PLT); Gruber (Nuclear Tech); Charles "Chick" Chapple; Max Lennert "Rockhound"; Harry S. Stamper; Davis, Col. (CMR); Tucker (PLT); Halsey, Lt. (Nuclear Tech); Oscar Choi; A. J. Frost; Jayotis "Bear" Kurleenbear; Freddy Noonan; Lev Andropov	Armageddon (1998), film	Space Shuttle; Atlantis X-71 Military Space Shuttles: Freedom; Independence Mir (greatly expanded)	Contemporary
Atlantis crew: William Sharp, Col. (CMR); Jennifer Watts (PLT); Gruber (Nuclear Tech); Charles "Chick" Chapple; Max Lennert "Rockhound"; Harry S. Stamper; Davis, Col. (CMR); Tucker (PLT); Halsey, Lt. (Nuclear Tech); Oscar Choi; A. J. Frost; Jayotis "Bear" Kurleenbear; Freddy Noonan; Lev Andropov	Atlantis destroyed by meteoroids preceding asteroid on collision course with Earth. X-71s each with 3 crew and 4 person drilling teams refuel at Mir, rescue Andropov from its destruction.		
Spurgeon "Fish" Tanner, Capt. Oren Monash (Pilot); Andrea "Andy" Baker; Gus Partenza, Dr. Mark Simon; Michail Tulchinsky, Col. (cosmonaut)	Deep Impact (1998), film	Space Shuttle; Atlantis Messiah	Near Future
Spurgeon "Fish" Tanner, Capt. Oren Monash (Pilot); Andrea "Andy" Baker; Gus Partenza, Dr. Mark Simon; Michail Tulchinsky, Col. (cosmonaut)	Astronauts on mission to destroy an oncoming comet.		
Gus Malone (CAPCOM) Unnamed astronauts	Nemesis (1998), novel	Space Shuttle	Contemporary
Gus Malone (CAPCOM) Unnamed astronauts	Astronauts on mission to deflect an oncoming asteroid.		
NASA: Claire Daughenbaugh, Capt. (USN) (Physician/Rukh carrier aircraft crew); Doug Waterhouse Envoy: Samson "Sam" Quinn, Gen. (Note: Stated to be a "two-star general" (p. 13) and a "Brigadier General" (a one-star rank) (p. 204).) (USAF) (Commander); Charles Stuart Loomis, Cdre. (USN) (Second-in-command/Weapons officer); John Bernstein, Dr. (Physicist/Physician); Stephen Edmunson, Maj. (USAF) (Weapons officer); Martin Tillery, Cmdr. (USN) (Engineer/Physicist) Firebird: May Sherbourne Wyndham (Pilot/Rocket scientist); Mycroft Yellowhorse (a.k.a. William Connors; born Guillaume Olivier Connors) (JNAIT Council of Chiefs Director-at-large); Tobias Desmond "Toby" Glyer, Dr. (Engineer/Physician); Alice Johnson (Security consultant)	The Goliath Stone (2013), novel	NASA: Envoy (40-V air launch to orbit spaceplane) Joint Negotiating Alliance of Indian Tribes (JNAIT): Firebird (40-V air launch to orbit spaceplane)	June 2052
Crews racing to intercept asteroid being returned to Earth by nanites.
Asteris: James Wheeler, Capt. (USMC); Gordon, Dr. (Pentagon) (Physicist); Clayton, Sgt. (Reconnaissance); Cabrera, Cpl. (Demolitions); Southard, Lt. (Communications); Fitzpatrick (Pilot); Sanchez (US Army) (Pilot) Other SI-22s: Magowan, Gen. (Pilot) "Mac" McCanless, Col. (USAF) (Pilot); Unnamed pilots	Age of Tomorrow (2014), film	SI-22 Asteris (spaceplane); Unnamed SI-22s	Contemporary/Near Future
Asteris: James Wheeler, Capt. (USMC); Gordon, Dr. (Pentagon) (Physicist); Clayton, Sgt. (Reconnaissance); Cabrera, Cpl. (Demolitions); Southard, Lt. (Communications); Fitzpatrick (Pilot); Sanchez (US Army) (Pilot) Other SI-22s: Magowan, Gen. (Pilot) "Mac" McCanless, Col. (USAF) (Pilot); Unnamed pilots	Crew of mission to destroy asteroid is transported through wormhole to alien planet.		
Foresight Americo: Xiaohán "Zoë" One-person spacecraft: Evan Chess (Mission Commander); Jamila Parks (US) (SP); Alistair Meath, Maj. (UK) (SP); Valentina Resnick Baker, Dr. (SP); David Powell (SP)	Catalyst Prime: The Event (2017), comic book	Foresight Corporation: Foresight Americo Lunar Platform (lunar-orbit space station); Five one-person spacecraft	2017
Foresight Americo: Xiaohán "Zoë" One-person spacecraft: Evan Chess (Mission Commander); Jamila Parks (US) (SP); Alistair Meath, Maj. (UK) (SP); Valentina Resnick Baker, Dr. (SP); David Powell (SP)	Astronauts on suicide mission to destroy asteroid Icarus 2.		
Benedict Drask, Col.	Don't Look Up (2021), film	NASA	Contemporary
Benedict Drask, Col.	Military veteran sent to deflect comet heading for Earth. His presence is superfluous due to rocket-guiding computer systems, but he is chosen so there can be a "hero".		
Ed Baldwing (USA); Gregory Kuznetsov (USSR); Svetlana Zhakharova (USSR); Samantha Massey (USA); Tom Parker (UK); Ravi Vaswani (India); Max Taylor (USA); Park Chui Moo (South Korea); Nina Rozhenkova (USSR); Palmer James (USA)	For All Mankind Season 4 (2025)	NASA; ROSKOSMOS; ISRO; ESA; Helios Aerospace	Alternative 2003
Ed Baldwing (USA); Gregory Kuznetsov (USSR); Svetlana Zhakharova (USSR); Samantha Massey (USA); Tom Parker (UK); Ravi Vaswani (India); Max Taylor (USA); Park Chui Moo (South Korea); Nina Rozhenkova (USSR); Palmer James (USA)	First mission to capture an asteroid by mining operations. The mission fails, resulting in the deaths of Kuznetsov and Parker. The mission takes place in an alternative 2003.		

== Other ==
Name(s)	Appeared in	Program / Mission / Spacecraft	Fictional date
Sky Masters, Maj.	Sky Masters of the Space Force (1958–61), comic	Unknown	Near Future
Sky Masters, Maj.	Astronaut in the United States Space Force (USSF).		
United States: Edward McCauley, Col. William Smith, Lt. Lester Forsythe, Capt. Donald Michaels, Capt. Warnecke, Maj. (Dr.) (Physician); William Thyssen, Dr. (Scientist); Barrett, Capt. Briggs, Maj. Gibbie Gibson, Maj. Bob Stark, Capt. Horton, Dr. (Physicist); Randolph, Dr. (Biologist); Murphy, Lt. (Space Station Astra Executive Officer); Hamilton, Dr. (Astronomer); Stoner, Col. Nick Alborg, Maj. Bill Alborg, Lt. Col. Art Frey, Lt. Jerry Rutledge, Lt. Franklin, Maj. Williams, Capt. Eden, Lt. (Navigator); Paul Ellis, Maj. (Dr.) (Physician); Muriel Catherine Gallagher, Dr. (Astronomer); Caleb Fisk, Dr. (Astronomer); Torrance Alexander, Dr. (Astronomer); Arnold Rawdin, Dr. (Scientist); Vern Driscoll, Lt. Col. Summers, Maj. (Spacecraft commander); Lewsham, Capt. Johnny Farrow, Capt. Swanson, Capt. Bowyers, Maj. Steven Hawkes, Maj. (Psychologist); Thomas Ward, Capt. (Dr.) (Physician); Canell, Maj. (Space Station Astra Executive Officer); Fred Jones, Cpl. Grinder, Sgt. Saunders, Amn. Luraski, Dr. (Geophysicist); Ron Benson, Capt. (Communications Officer); Hodges, Maj. Bob King "Tex" Nolan, Maj. Others UK: Tom Hetherford, Grp Cpt (Vega commander); Sopwith, Flt Lt (Vega co-pilot); Neil Bedford-Jones, Lt (MR co-pilot)	Men into Space (a.k.a. Space Challenge) (1959–60), TV	United States Air Force: Space Station Astra; LX-318; 0915; Reentry tests Tanker Able; R-101; S-107; Eclipse; M-13; L78-1 missions MR-28; X-1000; TR-1 British National Space Agency (UK): Project Vega; MR (rescue mission)	c. 1970–1980
Future astronauts build and crew space station and fly near-Earth missions, including landings on asteroid L78-1.
Lunar Base #1: Lansfield, Col. Cutler, Lt. Unnamed personnel Pegasus 3: Leonard, Capt. (Pilot); Webb, Lt. (Navigator) Pegasus 4: Frank Chapman, Capt. (Pilot); Ray Makonnen, Lt. (Navigator) Rescue ship: Beecher, Capt. White, Lt.	The Phantom Planet (1961), film	United States Air Force; Space Exploration Wing: Lunar Base #1; Pegasus 3 (Flight 361); Pegasus 4 Rescue ship	1980 (from March 16)
Lunar Base #1: Lansfield, Col. Cutler, Lt. Unnamed personnel Pegasus 3: Leonard, Capt. (Pilot); Webb, Lt. (Navigator) Pegasus 4: Frank Chapman, Capt. (Pilot); Ray Makonnen, Lt. (Navigator) Rescue ship: Beecher, Capt. White, Lt.	Astronauts who investigate mysteriously appearing planet Rheton.		
Dead astronauts: Merril (1998); Pokrovski (1999); Connolly; Tkachev; Maiakovski; Brodisnek (no first names given); Roger Woodward Travis (no first/last name given)	"The Cage of Sand" (1962), short story	Unknown	1998; 1999; 21st century
Dead astronauts: Merril (1998); Pokrovski (1999); Connolly; Tkachev; Maiakovski; Brodisnek (no first names given); Roger Woodward Travis (no first/last name given)	Seven dead astronauts orbiting Earth in their slowly reentering space capsules. Merril and Pokrovski failed to reach launching platforms in Earth orbit; Woodward died testing new launching platform. Travis was rookie astronaut for civilian company whose courage failed during launch countdown.		
United States: Scott, Capt. (no first name given); Unnamed astronaut Unnamed sergeant Eastern Space Patrol: Vaslov, Maj. (no first name given)	Colormation Screen Test (1962), short film	International Space Commission: Wheel 4 (Space station) Eastern Space Patrol: Red Star Patrol	Near Future
United States: Scott, Capt. (no first name given); Unnamed astronaut Unnamed sergeant Eastern Space Patrol: Vaslov, Maj. (no first name given)	US astronaut tells Congressional committee about recent events in space.		
Prospero: Grunfeld; Croker; Ness; Jackson; Unnamed captain Caliban: 5 unnamed astronauts Snug: 5 unnamed astronauts Moth: 5 unnamed astronauts Starveling: 5 unnamed astronauts	"The Snowbank Orbit" (1962), short story	United States Space Force: Prospero (ex-Mercury One); Caliban; Snug; Moth; Starveling	Future (Note: References to lunar bases and an expedition to Titania suggest the story is set in the 21st century rather than the 20th.)
Prospero: Grunfeld; Croker; Ness; Jackson; Unnamed captain Caliban: 5 unnamed astronauts Snug: 5 unnamed astronauts Moth: 5 unnamed astronauts Starveling: 5 unnamed astronauts	Mercury-bound astronauts ordered to slingshot around the Sun and head for Uranus and a risky aerobraking maneuver when the Solar System is invaded by aliens.		
Euro-American rocket: George Larson (Captain); Mike Fawsett (Vice-captain); Tom Fiske (U.S. Army); Uli Reinbach Russo-Chinese rocket: Nuri Bakovsky (Red Army) (Captain); Ivan Kratov (Red Army); Alexander Pitoyan (Scientist); Tara Ilyana	Fifth Planet (1963), novel	Euro-American rocket Russo-Chinese rocket	c. 2087 (May) – 2089
Euro-American rocket: George Larson (Captain); Mike Fawsett (Vice-captain); Tom Fiske (U.S. Army); Uli Reinbach Russo-Chinese rocket: Nuri Bakovsky (Red Army) (Captain); Ivan Kratov (Red Army); Alexander Pitoyan (Scientist); Tara Ilyana	Rival missions to Achilles, the fifth planet of Helios, a star passing through the Solar System. Ilyana is the first woman in space.		
Unnamed astronaut	Labyrinth (1963), opera	Unknown	Unknown
Unnamed astronaut	Astronaut aboard rocket somehow located inside mysterious Grand Hotel.		
Clark Benedict, Maj. (Station Commander); Mike Doweling, Capt. Kenneth Gavin, Lt. Gordon Halper, Lt. (Physician); Rupert Lawrence Howard, Lt.	The Outer Limits; Specimen: Unknown (1964), TV	United States Air Force/Department of Space Travel; Project Adonis: Space station Shuttlecraft 1010 (Space Shuttle Flight 572-3XA)	Near Future (from January 8)
Clark Benedict, Maj. (Station Commander); Mike Doweling, Capt. Kenneth Gavin, Lt. Gordon Halper, Lt. (Physician); Rupert Lawrence Howard, Lt.	Space station crew imperiled by deadly alien plants.		
Donovan; Brewer; Jasson (Engineer); Unnamed narrator	"Night Dweller" (1965), short story	Unknown	Future
Donovan; Brewer; Jasson (Engineer); Unnamed narrator	Crew on suicide mission beyond Pluto's orbit to destroy entity approaching from outside Solar System.		
Gary Jason, Col.	Jigsaw (1966), comic book series	Earth Space Force: Stargazer One	Contemporary/Near Future
Gary Jason, Col.	Astronaut injured in space is rescued by aliens and turned into the superhero Jigsaw.		
Test Vehicle 1: Bob Wilson, Maj. Chip Morton, Lt. Cmdr. (Co-Pilot) Test Vehicle 2: Lee Crane, Capt.	Voyage to the Bottom of the Sea; Journey With Fear (1967), TV	United States; Space Exploration Agency (SEA): Test Vehicle 1 Test Vehicle 2	1981
Test Vehicle 1: Bob Wilson, Maj. Chip Morton, Lt. Cmdr. (Co-Pilot) Test Vehicle 2: Lee Crane, Capt.	Experimental underwater launch of orbital flight from Seaview by Polaris missile. Test Vehicle 1 is boarded by alien in flight; Test Vehicle 2, with Crane aboard, is snatched at speed of light to alien base on Venus.		
Unnamed astronaut	Yonggary (1967), film	NSRC (Republic of Korea): Rocket #7X (one-man capsule)	Near Future
Unnamed astronaut	Korean astronaut on reconnaissance flight to monitor mid-East nuclear test.		
Valentina Prokrovna (Russia) Robert Hamilton (USA)	"The Dead Astronaut" (1968), short story	Unknown	Near Future
Valentina Prokrovna (Russia) Robert Hamilton (USA)	Two of twelve dead astronauts left orbiting Earth in their respective spacecraft. Hamilton was carrying atomic weapon on military mission.		
Charles Dreighton [sp.?] Space station: Two unnamed astronauts Supply rocket: Unnamed astronaut	Joe 90; Most Special Astronaut (1968), TV	O.C.T: (Note: The acronym "O.T.C." appears on the space station and rocket models.); Space station Supply rocket/Space module	Early 21st century (February)
Charles Dreighton [sp.?] Space station: Two unnamed astronauts Supply rocket: Unnamed astronaut	After supply rocket launch failure, two astronauts are stranded with dwindling air supply on O.C.T. space station commissioned by World Intelligence Network (WIN). Joe 90 comes to the rescue.		
P One: Morrison, Col. Drew, Maj. Hollis, Capt. (First names not given) P Two: McCullough, Lt. Col. Walters, Maj. Berryman, Capt. (First names not given)	All Judgement Fled (1969), novel	Prometheus Project; P One; P Two	Near Future
P One: Morrison, Col. Drew, Maj. Hollis, Capt. (First names not given) P Two: McCullough, Lt. Col. Walters, Maj. Berryman, Capt. (First names not given)	Astronauts dispatched to make first contact with an alien spacecraft.		
Andros V: Unnamed American astronauts Zond 19: Unnamed Soviet cosmonauts	The Andromeda Strain (1969), novel	Andros Project; Andros V Zond Project; Zond 19	Near Future
Andros V: Unnamed American astronauts Zond 19: Unnamed Soviet cosmonauts	Astronauts killed when the Andromeda organism destroys the heat shields of their spacecraft on re-entry.		
Bunny; Fred Hoffa; Other unnamed astronauts and technicians	The Long Twilight (1969), novel	Unknown	Near Future (c. 1996)
Bunny; Fred Hoffa; Other unnamed astronauts and technicians	Astronauts aboard the United States Weather Satellite, who spot the abrupt beginnings of a hurricane-like storm.		
Remus: Kindle (Captain); Unnamed stewardess Governor (Unnamed) (Passenger); Lavinia Pickerell (Passenger); 11 unnamed passengers Space station: Aceworthy, Prof. (Weather department) (No first name given); Terence (Animal experiments) (no last name given); Unnamed personnel	Miss Pickerell and the Weather Satellite (1971), novel	Tandem Space Shuttle (Booster ship (Note: Not stated to be a crewed booster.)/Remus [Orbital ship]) Space station	Near Future (Late Summer)
Remus: Kindle (Captain); Unnamed stewardess Governor (Unnamed) (Passenger); Lavinia Pickerell (Passenger); 11 unnamed passengers Space station: Aceworthy, Prof. (Weather department) (No first name given); Terence (Animal experiments) (no last name given); Unnamed personnel	Miss Pickerell travels to space station to investigate malfunctioning weather satellite. Sequel to Miss Pickerell Goes to Mars and Miss Pickerell on the Moon (q.v.).		
William J. Lardner	"Light Verse" (1973), short story	Unknown	Future (21st century?)
William J. Lardner	Widow of astronaut Lardner, who sacrificed himself to allow passenger ship to reach Space Station 5, unexpectedly commits murder.		
Beauregard Jackson	Land of the Lost; Hurricane (1974), TV	Hypersonic glider	Near Future (c. 1990s)
Beauregard Jackson	During reentry, Jackson passes through time window into pocket universe.		
William "Buck" Rogers, Capt.	Buck Rogers in the 25th Century (1979–81), TV	Ranger 3	1987
William "Buck" Rogers, Capt.	NASA astronaut whose voyage in a Space Shuttle-like "deep space probe" results in suspended animation.		
Newman; Mathews; Williams (no first names given)	The Aftermath (a.k.a. Zombie Aftermath) (1982), film	United States: Nautilus (spaceplane)	Near Future (20th century)
Newman; Mathews; Williams (no first names given)	Astronauts who return to Earth to discover it devastated by nuclear and biological warfare and infested with mutants.		
Unnamed Mission Specialist/Commander; Vollmer (Engineering/Communications/Weapons) (no first name given)	"Human Moments in World War III" (1983), short story	Colorado Command: Tomahawk II (Recon-Interceptor)	Near Future
Unnamed Mission Specialist/Commander; Vollmer (Engineering/Communications/Weapons) (no first name given)	Astronauts in Earth orbit come under control of Colorado Command rather than Houston after outbreak of World War III.		
Tank Farm: Ralph Rutter, Dr. (Director); Don Ishido, Dr. (Communications/Operations Chief); Susan Sorbanes, Dr. (Business Manager); Emily Testa (Italy); Unnamed chief flight controller Unnamed personnel Pacifica: Robert Bahnz, Col. (DOD); Henry Woke, Dr. (NASA official); Unnamed astronauts	"Tank Farm Dynamo" (a.k.a. "Tank Farm") (1983), short story	Colombo-Carroll Foundation: Colombo Station (a.k.a. Tank Farm) NASA: Space Shuttle; Pacifica	c. 1999
Tank Farm: Ralph Rutter, Dr. (Director); Don Ishido, Dr. (Communications/Operations Chief); Susan Sorbanes, Dr. (Business Manager); Emily Testa (Italy); Unnamed chief flight controller Unnamed personnel Pacifica: Robert Bahnz, Col. (DOD); Henry Woke, Dr. (NASA official); Unnamed astronauts	Orbital platform built from Space Shuttle external tanks and run by American-Italian consortium faces takeover bid by US government.		
Joanne Davis, Maj. (Note: Promoted to Lt Col. at the novel's conclusion.) (USAF)	DEMON-4 (1984), novel	NASA; Space Station	Near Future (Note: Exact year is not specified, but references to extensive orbital infrastructure suggest a time in the late 20th/early 21st C relative to the date of publication.)
Joanne Davis, Maj. (USAF)	NASA astronaut who survived the destruction of her space platform during WWIII, reassigned to help in the destruction of a rogue undersea fortress.		
Evans (Captain); Floyd (Engineer); Grundy (Navigator) (no first names given)	Doctor Who; Search for the Doctor (1986), gamebook	Enterprise 21 space freighter	August 2056
Evans (Captain); Floyd (Engineer); Grundy (Navigator) (no first names given)	Three-man crew returning from satellite servicing mission disappears into Bermuda Triangle.		
Frances Reese; Jan DuToit; Bill Noyes; Mary Xu; Valentina Romanova; Mikhail Savchenko; Chuck Wenzel; Anna Cherneva; Yuri Finnegan; John Jackson; Gerry Wolf; Maria Blixen; Bertorelli; Perez; Saha (First names not given for the last three characters) Hipparchus Base: Roger Bryant; Jim Russell; Hyashi Higuchi; Ben Templeton; Greg Able	Double Planet (1988), novel	Space Shuttles; Ares I Ares II; Discovery; Sir Fred Hoyle; Predpriyatie; Tsiolkovski Moonbase; Hipparchus Base	Near Future
Frances Reese; Jan DuToit; Bill Noyes; Mary Xu; Valentina Romanova; Mikhail Savchenko; Chuck Wenzel; Anna Cherneva; Yuri Finnegan; John Jackson; Gerry Wolf; Maria Blixen; Bertorelli; Perez; Saha (First names not given for the last three characters) Hipparchus Base: Roger Bryant; Jim Russell; Hyashi Higuchi; Ben Templeton; Greg Able	New Aeronautical and Space Administration (NASA) astronauts and scientists on a mission to investigate the possibility of mining the Comet Osaki-Mori for resources the ReUnited Nations (RN) needs to rebuild Earth.		
Wallace	A Grand Day Out (1989)	Get cheese from the moon	1989
Wallace	When Wallace and his dog Gromit run out of cheese the two of them decide to go to the moon for more cheese.		
Wayfarer 1 Theodore Ludendorff, Cmdr; Five unnamed astronauts Wayfarer 2 Jake Ryder; Speed Spencer; Faye McFarland; Boris Mechanov; Ada Lin; Irwin Rote Von Braun; Ki Susato; Unnamed astronauts	Reach (1989), novel	Wayfarer Program; Wayfarer 1 Wayfarer 2 Space Station; Von Braun	2037 – 2040
Wayfarer 1 Theodore Ludendorff, Cmdr; Five unnamed astronauts Wayfarer 2 Jake Ryder; Speed Spencer; Faye McFarland; Boris Mechanov; Ada Lin; Irwin Rote Von Braun; Ki Susato; Unnamed astronauts	When contact is lost with an expedition to a mysterious cluster of objects passing outside the orbit of Pluto a second expedition is sent to investigate.		
Unnamed astronaut	"The Village...the Village...the Earth...the Earth and the Suicide of the Astronaut" (1995), short story	"Space corporation"	Unknown
Unnamed astronaut	After traveling around the Solar System, astronaut is unable to find work back on Earth.		
Meridian: William Clark, Capt. Helene Dufour, Dr. (France) (Medical Officer); Lara Nabakov, Cmdr. (Security Officer); Richard Gordon, Cmdr. (Engineer); Thomas Somerset, Dr. Shuttle: Louis Bidwell (Commander); Unnamed astronauts	The Outer Limits; Bodies of Evidence (1997), TV	International Space Agency: UNAS Meridian (space station); Escape pod Space shuttle	June 20 – July 2037
Meridian: William Clark, Capt. Helene Dufour, Dr. (France) (Medical Officer); Lara Nabakov, Cmdr. (Security Officer); Richard Gordon, Cmdr. (Engineer); Thomas Somerset, Dr. Shuttle: Louis Bidwell (Commander); Unnamed astronauts	Space station commander Clark is accused of murder after Gordon, Somerset and Nabakov die due to hallucinations. Space agency has also attempted to reach outer planets.		
Channing Blythe Knowlton	Eater (2000), novel	NASA	c. 2022 (February–July)
Channing Blythe Knowlton	Former NASA astronaut dying of cancer volunteers to confront sentient black hole.		
Oliver Greenberg; Mike Weissman; Two unnamed astronauts	"Open Loops" (2000), short story	NASA: Ehricke	Near Future
Oliver Greenberg; Mike Weissman; Two unnamed astronauts	On mission to Ra-Shalom, Space Shuttle veteran Greenberg becomes the first human to visit an asteroid. Greenberg later spends one million years living on Ra-Shalom while the universe changes around him.		
Unnamed astronauts	Brando: Carbon Copies (2002), music video	Unknown	Future
Unnamed astronauts	Astronauts building space station to orbit distant planet which resembles Mars.		
Antonio (Mexico) (no last name given); Unnamed astronaut	"Will You Be an Astronaut?" (2002), short story	Space Station Vigilancia	Unknown (Alternate History)
Antonio (Mexico) (no last name given); Unnamed astronaut	In alternate history in which Apollo 11 never returned to Earth, Antonio defends Earth from telepathic entities called Asps.		
Christopher Goszen	The Memory Chamber (2006), short film	SpaceCo	2019
Christopher Goszen	Novelist-turned-astronaut confuses memories, dreams and reality while on mission to asteroid.		
Two unnamed astronauts	An Inconvenient Penguin Death March (2007), short film	Unknown	Near Future
Two unnamed astronauts	Astronauts stranded in space as penguins take over world.		
Carpathia: Richard Jacob Johansenn; Susan Kirmatsu (Pilot); Robbie Hamilton (Co-pilot); Patricia Mattos (Chief archeologist); Heidi Vogt (archeologist); Unnamed astronauts and observers Deep Space Dart: Richard J. Johansenn; Mac McFerson; Greg Yovel; Rachel Saunders (Forensic anthropologist); Helen Dail (Reporter); Unnamed astronauts	"Recovering Apollo 8" (2007), short story	Johansenn Interplanetary: Carpathia (Hawk-class) Deep Space Dart	2007 (Alternate History) 2018 (Alternate History) 2020 (Alternate History)
Carpathia: Richard Jacob Johansenn; Susan Kirmatsu (Pilot); Robbie Hamilton (Co-pilot); Patricia Mattos (Chief archeologist); Heidi Vogt (archeologist); Unnamed astronauts and observers Deep Space Dart: Richard J. Johansenn; Mac McFerson; Greg Yovel; Rachel Saunders (Forensic anthropologist); Helen Dail (Reporter); Unnamed astronauts	In alternate history in which Apollo 8 never returned to Earth, billionaire Johansenn makes it his life's mission to recover the lost spacecraft and its crew. Apollo 20 is mentioned as having crashed into the Moon (no details given).		
Javier Fonseca, Dr. (Astrogeologist) Endurance: Neil Giffords, Dr. (US); Yuri Semyonov, Dr. (Russia); Glen Hosey, Dr. (Ireland) (Astrogeologist)	Spacemen Three (2008), short film	Endurance (space shuttle)	Future
Javier Fonseca, Dr. (Astrogeologist) Endurance: Neil Giffords, Dr. (US); Yuri Semyonov, Dr. (Russia); Glen Hosey, Dr. (Ireland) (Astrogeologist)	Hosey replaces 11-spaceflight-veteran Fonseca on 24-month mission to gray planet that resembles Mars.		
Samuel Sheppard (Captain); Jackson (Pilot); Blake Santos, Dr. (Physician)	The Space Between (2009), short film	Space Shuttle; Lustria	Near Future
Samuel Sheppard (Captain); Jackson (Pilot); Blake Santos, Dr. (Physician)	NASA astronauts on nine-year mission using hibernation technology.		
NASA: Robert Danforth (USN) Freedom: Holly (Traffic control); Unnamed personnel Tri-Star: Jake; Dan; Unnamed personnel	"Space Hero" (2010), short story	NASA: Space Shuttle; Discovery; Mars One Soyuz Freedom (space station); Tri-Star (space station); Orbital shuttle	Near Future
NASA: Robert Danforth (USN) Freedom: Holly (Traffic control); Unnamed personnel Tri-Star: Jake; Dan; Unnamed personnel	NASA astronaut Danforth, who made emergency landing aboard Discovery after launch malfunction, visits commercial space stations, one of which is building spacecraft for first Mars mission.		
Halcyon: Arthur; Robert (no last names given)	Capsule (2011), short film	NASA: Orion/Constellation; Halcyon (lander)	Unknown
Halcyon: Arthur; Robert (no last names given)	Two astronauts in Halcyon have landed (possibly on Venus or Mars) and are running out of oxygen. The ending leaves ambiguous whether or not the story is a daydream.		
Unnamed cosmonaut (US?)	The Cosmonaut (2011), short film	Unknown	Unknown
Unnamed cosmonaut (US?)	Cosmonaut returns from space to find his girlfriend has grown old and died.		
Windermere: David Brock; Craig Swanson, Sqn Ldr (RAF); Joanna Slade Jules Verne: Philippe Lefevre, Commandant; Svenni Nilson	Doctor Who; The Feast of Axos (2011), audio play	Ironclad Industries: Windermere Eurozone Space Agency: Jules Verne (shuttle); Johann Kepler (shuttle)	c. 2020s (Note: The story is set fifty years after The Claws of Axos.)
Windermere: David Brock; Craig Swanson, Sqn Ldr (RAF); Joanna Slade Jules Verne: Philippe Lefevre, Commandant; Svenni Nilson	Ironclad Industries attempts to solve Earth's energy problems by accessing energy from the alien parasite Axos.		
Markus Samuel Ditto, Cmdr.	Imprint (2011), short film	GSI: Eco Mission (Space Shuttle)	Near Future
Markus Samuel Ditto, Cmdr.	Astronaut creates holographic replica of himself rather than his wife as companion for journey beyond Mars.		
Galenka Makarova (Pilot); Dimitri Ivanov (Data acquisition and transmission); Yakov Demin (Flight systems specialist)	Troika (2011), novella	Tereshkova; Soyuz re-entry vehicle	2039
Galenka Makarova (Pilot); Dimitri Ivanov (Data acquisition and transmission); Yakov Demin (Flight systems specialist)	Cosmonauts from revived Soviet Union investigate mysterious artifact in space. Tereshkova has VASIMIR drive.		
Oscar Homeslice	The Ballad of Oscar Homeslice (2012), short film	Unknown	Contemporary
Oscar Homeslice	Legendary astronaut inspires young man to realize he is a hippogriff.		
Phoebe base (2020): Lyman Hsu (Station Chief); Tina "Tiny" Lundgren (Deputy Station Chief); Gabriel Campbell (Geologist); Thaddeus Stankiewicz (Engineer); Bryce Lewis; Alan Childs; Unnamed personnel Phoebe base (2023): Irv Weingart (Station Chief); Thaddeus Stankiewicz (Deputy Station Chief); Dino Agnelli (Electrical engineer); Jarred Finnegan (Base mechanic); Chuck (no last name given); 11 unnamed personnel PS-1 Independent Inspection Team: Marcus Judson (NASA contractor); Olivia Finch, Prof. (Quality assurance engineer); Savannah "Savvy" Morgan (USAF, civilian) (Computer security engineer); Reuben Swenson (Department of Energy) (Power systems engineer)	Energized (2012), novel	NASA: Phoebe base Powersat One (PS-1)	February 22, 2020 April 10 – November 4, 2023
When asteroid Phoebe approaches Earth, NASA captures it and places it in Earth orbit to investigate its resources. Stankiewicz is blackmailed into secret project, leading to his murdering Campbell during EVA on Phoebe to avoid discovery. Three years later, inspection team investigates newly constructed powersat.
Thom (Netherlands?) (no last name given)	Tears of Steel (2012), short film	Unknown	Future
Thom (Netherlands?) (no last name given)	Thom's decision to become an astronaut causes his girlfriend Celia to create killer robots that take over the world. Remade in Chinese in 2013.		
Charlotte Hayden, Dr. (Senior Mission Commander); Jack Overholt, Col. (Military Commander); Gabriel Drum, Maj. (Military Executive Officer); Alberto Gomez, Lt. (Physician); Manesh Kalani, Dr. (Linguist/Computer Specialist); Donald "Pritch" Pritchard, Dr. (Chief Astronomer); Cary Rowan, Dr. (Geologist); Kyoko Takahashi, (Note: Incorrectly named "Kyoko Takamura" in Volume 1 crew portrait caption (p. 155).) Dr. (Physician); John S. Willett, Sgt. (OSCAR Corps) (Chief Engineer)	Letter 44 (2013–2017), comic book series	Project Monolith (US): USS Clarke; Bowman (shuttle)	c. 2009
Charlotte Hayden, Dr. (Senior Mission Commander); Jack Overholt, Col. (Military Commander); Gabriel Drum, Maj. (Military Executive Officer); Alberto Gomez, Lt. (Physician); Manesh Kalani, Dr. (Linguist/Computer Specialist); Donald "Pritch" Pritchard, Dr. (Chief Astronomer); Cary Rowan, Dr. (Geologist); Kyoko Takahashi, Dr. (Physician); John S. Willett, Sgt. (OSCAR Corps) (Chief Engineer)	Astronauts on secret mission to investigate alien artifact in asteroid belt. Drum, Gomez and Pritchard discover lush artificial environment on 730 Athanasia.		
Jack Corben, Capt.	Superman Family Adventures; The Menace of Metallo! (2013), comic book	Unknown (United States)	Contemporary/Near Future
Jack Corben, Capt.	Astronaut transformed into super-villain Metallo by encounter with kryptonite asteroids. (Note: This origin story for Metallo differs from other versions, in which Corben is not an astronaut. See the Metallo article.)		
Katie Sparks; Blair Taylor; Marcus Dawkins Seraphim: Harmon Kryger Seraphim: Molly Woods	Extant (2014–15), TV	International Space Exploration Agency (ISEA): Space Station; Seraphim	Near Future (2030s/2040s)
Katie Sparks; Blair Taylor; Marcus Dawkins Seraphim: Harmon Kryger Seraphim: Molly Woods	Woods returns from 13-month solo mission to find herself pregnant. Sparks, Taylor and Dawkins are deceased; Kryger was believed to have committed suicide after mysterious solar flare incident.		
Walsh, Dr. (Commander); Tom Compton, Ph.D. (Pilot); Bartholomew Alan "Berg" Bergen, Ph.D. (Engineer); Ronald Gibbs, Ph.D. Jane Augusta Holloway, Ph.D. (Linguist); Ajaya Varma, M.D. (Flight Surgeon)	Fluency (2014), novel	NASA; Alpha Mission: Providence	Future (21st century)
Walsh, Dr. (Commander); Tom Compton, Ph.D. (Pilot); Bartholomew Alan "Berg" Bergen, Ph.D. (Engineer); Ronald Gibbs, Ph.D. Jane Augusta Holloway, Ph.D. (Linguist); Ajaya Varma, M.D. (Flight Surgeon)	Astronauts dock with alien spacecraft discovered by Mariner 4 in 1964 and monitored by NASA ever since. Gibbs is an ISS veteran.		
Nebulon "Lon" Innes	"Airtight" (2015), short story	Bezospace: MK212	Future (after 2035)
Nebulon "Lon" Innes	Former lunar ferry pilot stakes claim to minor planet in order to sell it to corporation. MK212 spacecraft described as "second-generation Dragon capsule".		
Dark Sky Station: Felix (Detective); Aouda (Flight Chief); Charlie (Maintenance); Unnamed personnel Orbital ascender: Unnamed pilot Unnamed flight engineer Phil Foggerty (Passenger); John Keyes (Passenger)	"Around The NEO in 80 Days" (2015), short story	Dark Sky Station (DSS) (Inflatable space habitat); 2 orbital ascenders (Space balloons)	Future
Dark Sky Station: Felix (Detective); Aouda (Flight Chief); Charlie (Maintenance); Unnamed personnel Orbital ascender: Unnamed pilot Unnamed flight engineer Phil Foggerty (Passenger); John Keyes (Passenger)	Adventurer Foggerty and valet Keyes attempt to win bet by flying around near-Earth object.		
Chinese spacecraft: Song-li "Song" Chunxi Private spacecraft: Sam Gunn	"Rare (Off) Earth Elements (A Sam Gunn Tale)" (2015), short story	People's Republic of China Private spacecraft (fusion propulsion)	Future
Chinese spacecraft: Song-li "Song" Chunxi Private spacecraft: Sam Gunn	Taikonaut travels to asteroid 94-12 to claim its resources for China, only to find Sam Gunn already there.		
Unnamed astronaut	Re-Entry (2015), short film	NASA: Eon One	Future
Unnamed astronaut	Female astronaut caught in fatal time loop after re-entry.		
Burnsey (no first name given); Unnamed astronaut	"Spacewalk" (2015), short story	N/A	Future
Burnsey (no first name given); Unnamed astronaut	Only survivors of 18-man deep space mission after the rest of the crew die in an EVA accident.		
Kenna Belecky (Outer Space Technician); Nick (Outer Space Technician) (no last name given)	"Ten Days Up" (2015), short story	McCormick-Dewey International: McCormick-Dewey ground-to-orbit lifting conduit ("the EL") (Space elevator)	Future
Kenna Belecky (Outer Space Technician); Nick (Outer Space Technician) (no last name given)	Solar flares hit space elevator train while "ostech" Belecky is performing EVA. Haley Wu is mentioned as having been the first human on Mars.		
Tombaugh One/Tombaugh Station: James Dayton (Commander); Kate Beck (Executive Officer); Tadeo "Cookie" Atsuka, Dr. (Data Analytics and Imaging); Elise Kenyata, Dr. (Geo-planetologist/Medical Officer); Robinson; Tucker (no first names given for last two)	"Tombaugh Station" (2015), short story	Corporate: Tombaugh One; Tombaugh Two; Tombaugh Three; Tombaugh Station	Future
Tombaugh One/Tombaugh Station: James Dayton (Commander); Kate Beck (Executive Officer); Tadeo "Cookie" Atsuka, Dr. (Data Analytics and Imaging); Elise Kenyata, Dr. (Geo-planetologist/Medical Officer); Robinson; Tucker (no first names given for last two)	Mysterious deaths on Pluto prior to completion of Venetia Burney Deep Space Cassegrain Telescope.		
Tyrille Smith	"A Walkabout Amongst The Stars" (2015), short story	Venturer	2035
Tyrille Smith	When Voyager 1 mysteriously reactivates, Aboriginal Australian astronaut is sent on NASA/international mission to investigate. Venturer consists of seven nuclear electric propulsion modules.		
Buck Hartford (Captain)	Umbra (2016), short film	NASA: Umbra	Future
Buck Hartford (Captain)	Son of famous pilot investigates mysterious anomaly.		
Space Now: Malcolm Pennington (Founder) NASA: Dennis Locke (Note: Not explicitly stated to be an astronaut.) (Program Director) Cronus candidates: Barney; Peter Jensen (UK) (Space Now); Meredith Korman (call sign Braniac) (Theoretical physicist); Stephen Miller (EU); Eleven unnamed candidates First Cronus mission: Jason "Ace" McCoy (NASA) (Commander); Hemi "Thor" (NASA) (Second-in-command); Antonio Curzon (call sign Playboy) (Space Now) (Payload Specialist); Isabelle Wolsten (call sign Bombshell) (NASA) (Payload Specialist); Bomber; Vicki Crum; Hennessey (Theoretical physicist); Lourdes; Mike; Dean Winters (call sign Frosty) Second Cronus mission: Velosi (call sign Velocity) (NASA) (Commander); Nine other astronauts	Beyond the Limits (2017), novel	NASA/Space Now/International programs: Cronus program (Shuttle/Space station)	Near Future (April – June)
Astronauts competing for slots on missions to build way station between Earth and Mars. Wolsten and Crum are ISS veterans. Billionaire Pennington attempted rendezvous with satellite aboard solar balloon, then set space diving world record on way down.
Jacob Lawson (Satellite designer); Ute Fassbinder (Space station commander)	Geostorm (2017), film	Space station	Near Future
Jacob Lawson (Satellite designer); Ute Fassbinder (Space station commander)	Engineer Lawson on climate-control satellite repair mission.		
Magellan: Roger Nelson, Capt. (USAF) (Commander) CNSA: Three unnamed taikonauts	Magellan (a.k.a. Messenger) (2017), film	NASA: X-57 (IC Magellan) CNSA: Unknown spacecraft	Future (21st century)
Magellan: Roger Nelson, Capt. (USAF) (Commander) CNSA: Three unnamed taikonauts	NASA astronaut on mission to find alien transmitters on Titan, Triton and Eris. Landing on Titan near Punga Mare. X-57 lander is a VTOL spaceplane.		
Planetary Resources and Exploration: Hiroshi Nevitt Barrick-Vale: Theresa (no last name given)	"To Lose the Stars" (2017), short story	Planetary Resources and Exploration Barrick-Vale Mining and Exploration Corporation	2047 Late 21st century
Planetary Resources and Exploration: Hiroshi Nevitt Barrick-Vale: Theresa (no last name given)	On solo survey expedition in the asteroid belt, Brazilian freelance surveyor Theresa discovers the dead body of legendary surveyor Nevitt.		
Cloverfield Space Station: Kiel (NASA/US) (Commander); Ava Hamilton (ESA/UK) (Com officer); Schmidt (ESA/Germany) (Physicist) "Volky" Volkov (Russia) "Monk" Acosta (Brazilian Space Agency) (Physician); Tam (China) (Shepard engineer); Mundy (ESA/Italy) Alternate universe crew: Mina Jensen (Shepard engineer)	The Cloverfield Paradox (2018), film	Cloverfield Space Station: Helios mission	Future
Cloverfield Space Station: Kiel (NASA/US) (Commander); Ava Hamilton (ESA/UK) (Com officer); Schmidt (ESA/Germany) (Physicist) "Volky" Volkov (Russia) "Monk" Acosta (Brazilian Space Agency) (Physician); Tam (China) (Shepard engineer); Mundy (ESA/Italy) Alternate universe crew: Mina Jensen (Shepard engineer)	Astronauts using Shepard Accelerator in attempt to solve energy crisis find that Earth has disappeared after accelerator test.		
Ferris 6: Amy Seaton (Captain); Unnamed communications tech Lander 1: Henson; Durand (no first names given) Lander 2: Harold "Hal" Jordan; Volkov (no first name given)	Green Lantern: Earth One; Volume One (2018), graphic novel	Ferris Galactic: Ferris 6 Monarcha Energy Palladium Mining Expedition; Lander 1 Lander 2	Contemporary/Near Future (Earth One)
Ferris 6: Amy Seaton (Captain); Unnamed communications tech Lander 1: Henson; Durand (no first names given) Lander 2: Harold "Hal" Jordan; Volkov (no first name given)	Asteroid miners who discover Green Lantern power ring and battery in asteroid belt. Jordan is a former NASA astronaut who worked on the Arrowhead project, an orbital launching station used as a missile platform.		
Stillness: Luckett "Lucky" Newman Cobalt Hill Inc "Cappies": Althea "Thea" (no last name given); Isabella Desrosiers; Hiro (no last name given); Charlotte Pontchartrain; Valer "Val" Simpson	"Shepherd Moon" (2018), short story	NASA: Stillness Cobalt Hill Inc; Capsules: Atlas; Hercules; McQueen; Spacey McSpaceface; Summit	Future (October)
Stillness: Luckett "Lucky" Newman Cobalt Hill Inc "Cappies": Althea "Thea" (no last name given); Isabella Desrosiers; Hiro (no last name given); Charlotte Pontchartrain; Valer "Val" Simpson	On her forty-first mission, "cappy" Thea flies capsule Summit to recover body of NASA astronaut Newman, her ex-boyfriend, killed in EVA accident on spaceflight in geosynchronous orbit. "Capsules" are small spacecraft used by private spaceflight industry.		
Hathor 18: Serizawa, Cmdr. (Commander); Eva Roberts, Cmdr. (Pilot); Unnamed science officer Unnamed technical assistant Outpost 2024 DEC: Troy William Holloway (United States) (Prospector/Engineering Technician); Milton; Harris, Lt.	Solis (2018), film	Orbis Mining Corporation: Hathor 18; Outpost 2024 DEC; EEV Khapera 2 (escape pod)	Future (between November and January)
Hathor 18: Serizawa, Cmdr. (Commander); Eva Roberts, Cmdr. (Pilot); Unnamed science officer Unnamed technical assistant Outpost 2024 DEC: Troy William Holloway (United States) (Prospector/Engineering Technician); Milton; Harris, Lt.	Aten asteroid miner Holloway in escape pod on collision course with Sun.		
Gang Lu (Captain); Unnamed astronauts	Restart (2019), short film	Spaceship Star Zoo	April 12, 2052
Gang Lu (Captain); Unnamed astronauts	Spacecraft is pulled through wormhole that appears in nuclear waste yard at Lagrange point, traveling to April 12 in the year 10,200,003,275. Star Zoo receives a transmission from Jiu Quan Space Command Center. Adapted from short story "Lagrange Cemetery" by Wang Jinkang.		
Melody Adams (NASA) Mission Commander/Astronomer (USA); Ye Zhigang (CNSA) Mission Pilot (China); Gabriella Mancarella (ESA) Engineer (Italy); Rick Worthington (CSA) Engineer (Canada); Dr. Selena Rogerton (NASA) Engineer/Mathematician (USA); Dr. Thomas Ehrmann (ESA) Chemist/Physician (Germany)	The Object (2024), novel	Pangea SpaceX Starship	2024
Melody Adams (NASA) Mission Commander/Astronomer (USA); Ye Zhigang (CNSA) Mission Pilot (China); Gabriella Mancarella (ESA) Engineer (Italy); Rick Worthington (CSA) Engineer (Canada); Dr. Selena Rogerton (NASA) Engineer/Mathematician (USA); Dr. Thomas Ehrmann (ESA) Chemist/Physician (Germany)	A group of astronauts are sent to intercept and research a mysterious extraterrestrial object which turns out to be a biological spaceship that is trying to communicate with them. Adams is an ISS veteran.		

== See also ==
List of fictional astronauts (exploration of outer Solar System)
