= List of fictional astronauts (modern period, works released 1975–1989) =

Lists of fictional astronauts
Early period	Project Mercury	Project Gemini
Project Apollo	1975–1989	1990–1999
2000–2009	2010–2029	Moon
Inner Solar System	Outer Solar System	Other
Far future

The following is a list of fictional astronauts from recent times, mostly using the Space Shuttle, as depicted in works released between 1975 and 1989.

== 1975–1979 ==
Name(s)	Appeared in	Program / Mission / Spacecraft	Fictional date
(1975–1979)
Spacelab Dynostar: Eddie Van Buren, Cmdr. Russ Walters (US); Bob Townsend; Phillip Lyall; Richard Hart (UK); Rene Lasalle; Jean Lucas (France); Theodore Neumann; Otto Sigmund (Germany); Will Patterson (Australia); Mel Freeman Orbiter Four: John Hayward, Cmdr. Eric Fischer; Daniel Sicura, Maj.	The Dynostar Menace (1975), novel	Space Station; Spacelab Dynostar Space Shuttle; Orbiter Four	Near Future
Spacelab Dynostar: Eddie Van Buren, Cmdr. Russ Walters (US); Bob Townsend; Phillip Lyall; Richard Hart (UK); Rene Lasalle; Jean Lucas (France); Theodore Neumann; Otto Sigmund (Germany); Will Patterson (Australia); Mel Freeman Orbiter Four: John Hayward, Cmdr. Eric Fischer; Daniel Sicura, Maj.	A multinational team of astronauts working under the auspices of the United States Space Authority (USSA) to carry out the first test of a nuclear fusion reactor in Earth orbit.		
Ed Tyler	Phoenix (1975), comic book series	Space Station; Threshold I Escape pod	1977
Ed Tyler	Astronaut becomes the superhero Phoenix the Protector after crashing in the Arctic.		
Prometheus: Patrick Winter, Maj. Ely Bron, Dr. Coretta Samuel, Dr. (Medic) (US); Nadya Kalinina, Maj. Vladimir Kuznekov, Col. Gregor Salnikov (USSR) Orbiter: Cooke, Maj. (CDR); Decosta, Capt. (PLT)	Skyfall (1976), novel	Orbital Power Station; Prometheus USAF Space Shuttle; Orbiter	Near Future
Prometheus: Patrick Winter, Maj. Ely Bron, Dr. Coretta Samuel, Dr. (Medic) (US); Nadya Kalinina, Maj. Vladimir Kuznekov, Col. Gregor Salnikov (USSR) Orbiter: Cooke, Maj. (CDR); Decosta, Capt. (PLT)	A series of malfunctions turn an attempt to launch an orbital solar power station into disaster, trapping the payload in a decaying orbit and forcing the use of a military space shuttle to rescue the crew, even as the race to prevent it crashing into a populated area continues.		
Olaf Carlsen Tom Carlsen, Col. (Commander); Eight others	The Space Vampires (1976), novel Lifeforce (1985), film	Hermes ESA Space Shuttle; HMS Churchill, rescue shuttle	Early 21st century Near Future
Olaf Carlsen Tom Carlsen, Col. (Commander); Eight others	Hermes crew finds alien craft adrift in open space; While investigating Halley's Comet an ESA/NASA crew of nine aboard the Churchill find an alien craft. Rescue shuttle returns aliens and Carlsen to Earth.		
Yamaguchi (personal name not given)	"Agoraphobia, A.D. 2000" (1977), short story	Space Agency (Note: The opening of the story implies that this is a test run for a crewed Mars mission.)	2000?
Yamaguchi (personal name not given)	Japanese astronaut sent into the last open space in the Tokyo Megalopolis to see how he responds.		
Shuttle 7: Unnamed CDR; Unnamed PLT Skylab: Unnamed commander Unnamed astronaut	The All-New Super Friends Hour; Space Emergency (1977), TV	USA: Space Shuttle; Shuttle 7 Skylab	Contemporary/Near Future
Shuttle 7: Unnamed CDR; Unnamed PLT Skylab: Unnamed commander Unnamed astronaut	After a docking malfunction cripples the shuttle and Skylab, Wonder Woman, Hawkman and Hawkgirl must save the imperiled astronauts.		
Three unnamed astronaut-scientists	The All-New Super Friends Hour; Planet of the Neanderthals (1977), TV	Skylab 2 (Note: Although called "Skylab", the space station in this episode does not resemble the real Skylab, as does the one in "Space Emergency".)	Contemporary/Near Future
Three unnamed astronaut-scientists	Astronauts assist Super Friends when Earth's civilization is regressed to a primitive state.		
Valery Adanin, Col.	The Dragon (1977), novel	Svoboda	Contemporary/Near Future
Valery Adanin, Col.	Cosmonaut dispatched on a solo orbital reconnaissance mission over China. Killed when his capsule is struck by the beam from a prototype Chinese ASAT/ABM laser.		
Holly Goodhead, Dr. (NASA/CIA) Numerous unnamed US Marine astronauts	Moonraker (1979), film/novel	Space Shuttle Moonraker 1–6 Military Space Shuttle; Marines	Contemporary
Holly Goodhead, Dr. (NASA/CIA) Numerous unnamed US Marine astronauts	James Bond and Goodhead launch to Hugo Drax's space station to thwart his plans. Six shuttles carrying several dozen men and women are also mentioned.		
Unnamed astronauts	Poseidon's Shadow (1979), novel	Space Shuttle (Note: Operated by the United States Air Force.)	Contemporary/Near Future
Unnamed astronauts	Astronauts launched to upgrade a military communications satellite.		
Spacelab 10: Unnamed US astronauts and unnamed cosmonauts Space Shuttle: Chuck Marshall (US); Giorgi (Last name not given) (USSR)	Quatermass (TV serial) (1979), TV/novel	Space Station; Spacelab 10 Space Shuttle; Not named, call-sign is Mother Bird	Near Future
Spacelab 10: Unnamed US astronauts and unnamed cosmonauts Space Shuttle: Chuck Marshall (US); Giorgi (Last name not given) (USSR)	Spacelab Ten is a joint US/Soviet space project.		
Addison "Skip" Carmichael; Melanie Slozar	Salvage 1 (1979), TV	SSTO; Vulture	Early 1980s
Addison "Skip" Carmichael; Melanie Slozar	Privately built rocket/spacecraft constructed by a scrapyard dealer. Used for lunar mission with the goal of salvaging Apollo hardware left on the Moon.		
Mike Bailey; Stacy Macklin	Wonder Woman (1979), comic books	NASA: Skylab; Space Shuttle	Contemporary/Near Future
Mike Bailey; Stacy Macklin	Astronaut trainees working with Diana Prince. Bailey turns out to be the Ten of Spades, a member of the Royal Flush Gang; Macklin later becomes the super-villain Lady Lunar.		

== 1980–1989 ==
Name(s)	Appeared in	Program / Mission / Spacecraft	Fictional date
(1980–1989)
Erhardt (CDR); Jensen (Co-pilot); Halverson; Garcia (First names not given)	A Cold Wind From Orion (1980), novel	Space Shuttle	Contemporary
Erhardt (CDR); Jensen (Co-pilot); Halverson; Garcia (First names not given)	Astronauts of the United States Space Agency (USSA) on a mission to prevent the uncontrolled re-entry of an orbiting bioweapons laboratory. (Note: One crewmember, Erhardt, is described as a veteran of the Apollo Program.)		
Steven Bancroft (CDR); Lewis "Lew" Price (PLT); John Gates, (Note: Listed as Judd Gates in closing credits.) Col. (USAF)	Hangar 18 (a.k.a. The Hangar 18 Cover-Up, Invasion Force) (1980), film	Space Shuttle	Contemporary (from October 25) (Note: According to theatrical release poster.)
Steven Bancroft (CDR); Lewis "Lew" Price (PLT); John Gates, Col. (USAF)	Launch of the first satellite by a Shuttle crew strikes a nearby UFO, killing Gates, who is conducting an EVA in the cargo bay.		
Three unnamed cosmonauts	Death Beam (1981), novel	Soviet Space Shuttle; Space Station	Near Future
Three unnamed cosmonauts	Cosmonauts assigned to assist the assembly of an orbital particle beam weapon aboard the Soviet Union's new permanently crewed space station.		
Soyuz 47; Valentin Karpov (Flight Cmdr.); Boris Tsiolkovsky (Flight Engineer); Shabir Al'Timimi (Pilot) Orbiter 102; Michael Allon, Col. Peter Peabody, Col. David Browne, Col.	The Hunting of Salyut 7 (1981), novel	Soyuz; Soyuz 47 Salyut; Salyut 7 Space Shuttle; Orbiter 102	Near Future
Soyuz 47; Valentin Karpov (Flight Cmdr.); Boris Tsiolkovsky (Flight Engineer); Shabir Al'Timimi (Pilot) Orbiter 102; Michael Allon, Col. Peter Peabody, Col. David Browne, Col.	Palestinian Guest Cosmonaut hijacks an armed Soviet space-station.		
Unnamed American astronauts	The Mahdi (1981), novel	Space Shuttle; Atlantis	Contemporary/Near Future (Alternate 1980s)
Unnamed American astronauts	Astronauts on a mission to place a satellite in geosynchronous orbit over the city of Mecca.		
Columbia: Unnamed pilot Unnamed copilot Unnamed shuttle: Tom Queensbury (CDR); George Wyatt (PLT); Rob Edwards (Backup PLT) Salyut-8: Mendenovich, Maj. (Commander); Petrov; Chan (Mongolia) (no first names given) Soyuz-T3 assigned crew: Zolotov (no first name given); Unnamed cosmonaut Soyuz-T3: Nick Carter [Nicholas J. Huntington Carter] (AXE); Martina Ludonova Dubrovnik (AXE) Soyuz: Gregor Kolakovich, Col. (KGB); Pietr (no last name given); Unnamed cosmonaut	Nick Carter; The Solar Menace (1981), novel	Space Shuttles: Columbia; Unnamed shuttle Salyut-8; Soyuz-T3; Soyuz	Contemporary (Midwinter)
Columbia: Unnamed pilot Unnamed copilot Unnamed shuttle: Tom Queensbury (CDR); George Wyatt (PLT); Rob Edwards (Backup PLT) Salyut-8: Mendenovich, Maj. (Commander); Petrov; Chan (Mongolia) (no first names given) Soyuz-T3 assigned crew: Zolotov (no first name given); Unnamed cosmonaut Soyuz-T3: Nick Carter [Nicholas J. Huntington Carter] (AXE); Martina Ludonova Dubrovnik (AXE) Soyuz: Gregor Kolakovich, Col. (KGB); Pietr (no last name given); Unnamed cosmonaut	Space Shuttle launches are sabotaged by Kolakovich. Carter and Dubrovnik commandeer Soyuz-T3 to fly to Salyut-8, which is equipped with solar mirror used by Soviets to destroy US listening posts. Kolakovich made four previous spaceflights. Delta wing Soviet space shuttle under development is mentioned.		
Vince Torino, Lt. Col; William Cranston Columbia: Christopher "Rusty" Bishop III, Col. (CDR); Richard Merriman, Lt. Col. (PLT) Enterprise: Austin "Tex" Harwood, Col. (CDR); Adrienne Brooks, Dr. (PLT) Atlantis: Lionel Gerber; Gordon Alexander Yorktown: Jack Lewis, Jr., Lt. Cmdr. (USN); Robert D. Clark, Lt. Col. (USAF) Hornet: Noonan; Schacter (First names not given)	Shuttle (1981), novel	Space Shuttles: Columbia; Enterprise; Atlantis Hypersonic Boosters: Yorktown; Hornet	Late 20th Century
Vince Torino, Lt. Col; William Cranston Columbia: Christopher "Rusty" Bishop III, Col. (CDR); Richard Merriman, Lt. Col. (PLT) Enterprise: Austin "Tex" Harwood, Col. (CDR); Adrienne Brooks, Dr. (PLT) Atlantis: Lionel Gerber; Gordon Alexander Yorktown: Jack Lewis, Jr., Lt. Cmdr. (USN); Robert D. Clark, Lt. Col. (USAF) Hornet: Noonan; Schacter (First names not given)	The first attempt to launch a space shuttle using a crewed booster fails, leaving both craft stranded in orbit.		
Joe Marvin Atlantis: Frank King, Col. (USAF), Pilot; Lew Clay, Cmdr. (USN), Co-Pilot; George "Hap" Hazard, P/S; Jacqueline Hart, M/S	Shuttle Down (1980/81), magazine serial, (1981), novel	Space Shuttle; Atlantis	Near Future
Joe Marvin Atlantis: Frank King, Col. (USAF), Pilot; Lew Clay, Cmdr. (USN), Co-Pilot; George "Hap" Hazard, P/S; Jacqueline Hart, M/S	Space Shuttle Atlantis is forced to make an emergency landing on Easter Island after launching from Vandenberg, causing an international crisis.		
Nikolai Federenko, Maj. (USSR); Keith Stoner, Dr. (NASA)	Voyagers (1981), novel	Soyuz	July 1984
Nikolai Federenko, Maj. (USSR); Keith Stoner, Dr. (NASA)	Soviet cosmonaut and American astronaut who rendezvous with an alien spacecraft some 1 million miles from Earth. Craft is a standard Soyuz docked to three other larger modules assembled at Salyut 6 along with a fourth "tanker" module.		
Roger Canfield, Capt. Jennifer Tate; David Ackroyd	The Astronauts (1982), TV	NASA: Scilab (space station)	Near Future
Roger Canfield, Capt. Jennifer Tate; David Ackroyd	Unsold pilot for American remake of British sitcom about astronauts on space station.		
Alvin Hyer, Capt. Dale Wilson, Capt.	The Greatest American Hero; The Shock Will Kill You (1982), TV	Space Shuttle; Columbia	Contemporary
Alvin Hyer, Capt. Dale Wilson, Capt.	Shuttle on a mission to rendezvous with uncrewed Venus probe (Eagle Scoop Explorer) is disabled by electric charge. Ralph Hinkley lands the shuttle safely, but both astronauts are dead.		
Alan Shepley (Pilot); Hinton (Co-Pilot) (no first name given); Unnamed payload specialist	"Memories of the Space Age" (1982), short story	Space Shuttle	Near Future
Alan Shepley (Pilot); Hinton (Co-Pilot) (no first name given); Unnamed payload specialist	Hinton murders former Apollo astronaut Shepley in orbit, causing time to slow in Florida.		
Alvin Kingsbury (CDR); Randy Hull (Co-Pilot)	Orbit (1982), novel	Space Shuttle; 02	Near Future
Alvin Kingsbury (CDR); Randy Hull (Co-Pilot)	When a hypersonic airliner suffers a malfunction that results in it being trapped in orbit NASA prepares a space shuttle for a rescue mission. (Note: The novel may have been the inspiration for the film Starflight One.)		
Dove: Oleg Sedrov, Cmdr. Nicolay Talin (Co-Pilot); Genin (Meteorologist); Vinnikov (First names not given for the last two crew)	The Red Dove (1982), novel	Soviet Space Shuttle; Dove	Near Future May 1983 – January 1984
Dove: Oleg Sedrov, Cmdr. Nicolay Talin (Co-Pilot); Genin (Meteorologist); Vinnikov (First names not given for the last two crew)	Co-pilot of the first Soviet Space Shuttle decides to defect to the United States along with his spacecraft after he discovers that the shuttle is carrying a thermonuclear weapon.		
Unnamed pilot Unnamed replacement pilot (M.A.D.)	Inspector Gadget; Launch Time (1983), TV	Space shuttle (Single-stage-to-orbit)	Contemporary
Unnamed pilot Unnamed replacement pilot (M.A.D.)	M.A.D. agent replaces astronaut pilot for satellite repair mission.		
Columbia: Chuck (Surname not given); Unnamed astronaut	Invasion 1984! (1983), comic book (Note: First published in Battle Picture Weekly between March and December of 1983.)	Space Shuttle; Columbia	1984
Columbia: Chuck (Surname not given); Unnamed astronaut	Astronauts sent to make first contact with a fleet of alien spacecraft.		
Excalibur: White; Hess; Frisch; Carroll (First names not given) Soyuz: Vladimir Sergeevich Danilov; Yuriy Ivanovich Zhukov	Kiev Footprint (1983), novel	Space Shuttle; Excalibur Soyuz	Alternate 1980s
Excalibur: White; Hess; Frisch; Carroll (First names not given) Soyuz: Vladimir Sergeevich Danilov; Yuriy Ivanovich Zhukov	After the space shuttle Excalibur loses contact with Earth while on a military mission, the Soviet Union sends a Soyuz to investigate.		
Kennedy (CDR); Goode (PLT); Jonathan Jaspar, Dr. (Astronomer); Governor (Unnamed) (Passenger); Mayor of Square Toe City (Unnamed) (Passenger); Lavinia Pickerell (Passenger)	Miss Pickerell and the Blue Whales (1983), novel	Space Agency (NASA?): Space Shuttle	Near Future (Early October)
Kennedy (CDR); Goode (PLT); Jonathan Jaspar, Dr. (Astronomer); Governor (Unnamed) (Passenger); Mayor of Square Toe City (Unnamed) (Passenger); Lavinia Pickerell (Passenger)	Miss Pickerell travels aboard space shuttle to investigate declining blue whale population. Sequel to Miss Pickerell Goes to Mars, Miss Pickerell on the Moon and Miss Pickerell and the Weather Satellite (q.v.).		
Christopher Leyland, Lt. Col. William Cooke, Maj. Wren T. Packard, Capt. Janet Caulden, Capt.	Blind Prophet (1984), novel	Space Shuttles: Constitution; Independence	Contemporary/Near Future
Christopher Leyland, Lt. Col. William Cooke, Maj. Wren T. Packard, Capt. Janet Caulden, Capt.	Crews of armed space shuttles sent to destroy Soviet military satellites. The satellites are launched under the guise of the double launch of the space stations Salyut 9 and Salyut 10.		
NASA astronauts: Neil O'Hara; Al Benyon; Jim Bayliss; Mike Pepper Non-NASA payload specialists: Kellinah Assad; David Heinlein	Dominator (1984), novel	Space Shuttle; Dominator (OV-141)	Near Future
NASA astronauts: Neil O'Hara; Al Benyon; Jim Bayliss; Mike Pepper Non-NASA payload specialists: Kellinah Assad; David Heinlein	NASA astronauts assigned to fly the Space Shuttle Dominator.		
Florida Arklab: Billy Hayes; Max Marek Maryland: Eva Thompson; Gregor Vandenburg	The Noah's Ark Principle (1984), film	Space Station; Florida Arklab Space Shuttle; Maryland	Near Future 10 November 1997 – 13 November 1997
Florida Arklab: Billy Hayes; Max Marek Maryland: Eva Thompson; Gregor Vandenburg	Astronauts of the United States/European Space Agency (USESA) who find themselves caught up in a murderous conspiracy.		
Ellen Vale, Dr. John Fitch; Robert Malfi	The Sheriff and the Astronaut (1984), TV	NASA	Contemporary
Ellen Vale, Dr. John Fitch; Robert Malfi	Unsold crime drama pilot about Vale's romance with sheriff of Carrow County.		
Anna Firdova, Maj. Sergi Bustovsky, Maj. Two unnamed cosmonauts	Black Alert (1985), novel	Soviet Space Station; Medusa Soyuz? Minotaur	Contemporary?
Anna Firdova, Maj. Sergi Bustovsky, Maj. Two unnamed cosmonauts	Cosmonauts assigned to crew a nuclear armed space station.		
Yurii Ryumin; Vladimir Malyshev	Cold Sea Rising (1985), novel	Soyuz? Soyuz P7	1999
Yurii Ryumin; Vladimir Malyshev	Cosmonauts on an Earth-sciences mission similar to that of Soyuz 22 who observe a volcanic eruption separate the Ross ice shelf from the Antarctic continent.		
Cecil Howe, Cmdr. Eva Jordan, Dr. Walker (First name not given)	Def-Con 4 (a.k.a. Ground Zero) (1985), film	Space Station; Nemesis	Near Future ("The day after tomorrow")
Cecil Howe, Cmdr. Eva Jordan, Dr. Walker (First name not given)	Military astronauts who become trapped in orbit when World War III breaks out.		
Rick Halman, Maj. (CDR); Jeff Cooper, Capt. (PLT); Brett Hilton (Mission Specialist); Nat Cramer (Project Specialist); Frank Hardy (passenger); Joe Hardy (passenger); Chet Morton [Chester "Chet" Morton Jr.] (passenger)	The Hardy Boys; The Skyfire Puzzle (1985), novel	Space Shuttle; Skyfire; Spacelab	Contemporary (Summer)
Rick Halman, Maj. (CDR); Jeff Cooper, Capt. (PLT); Brett Hilton (Mission Specialist); Nat Cramer (Project Specialist); Frank Hardy (passenger); Joe Hardy (passenger); Chet Morton [Chester "Chet" Morton Jr.] (passenger)	The Hardys and their friend Chet Morton participate in shuttle mission linked to an industrial espionage case.		
Alexis Gnutov	Silent Warriors (1985), novel	Soyuz Salyut; Salyut 27, "Lenin"	Near Future
Alexis Gnutov	Cosmonaut on a solo mission to a Salyut. Killed when the experimental laser weapon he is testing explodes on the first firing attempt.		
Steve Trevor [Steven Rockwell Trevor], Col. (USAF)	The Super Powers Team: Galactic Guardians; The Darkseid Deception (1985), TV	Space Shuttle	Contemporary/Near Future
Steve Trevor [Steven Rockwell Trevor], Col. (USAF)	Wonder Woman's boyfriend on solo Earth orbital mission to retrieve damaged TC-7 defense satellite. He is kidnapped and impersonated by Darkseid.		
Orbit One: Unnamed astronauts Rescue One: Phillip O'Toole, Capt. (CDR); Elizabeth Billings, Capt. (PLT); Daniel Track, Maj. (United States Army/The Consortium) (Mission Specialist)	Track; Revenge of the Master (1985), novel	Space Shuttles: Orbit One; Rescue One	Contemporary
Orbit One: Unnamed astronauts Rescue One: Phillip O'Toole, Capt. (CDR); Elizabeth Billings, Capt. (PLT); Daniel Track, Maj. (United States Army/The Consortium) (Mission Specialist)	NASA mission to launch four satellites and simulate rescue of Orbit One crew is targeted by criminal organization D.E.A.T.H. (Directorate for Espionage, Assassination, Terrorism and Harassment).		
Becky; Don; Gary (no last names given)	The Twilight Zone; Chameleon (1985), TV	Space Shuttle; Discovery	Contemporary
Becky; Don; Gary (no last names given)	NASA astronauts performing EVA when alien intelligence hitches ride on shuttle.		
Digger Reed	The Disney Sunday Movie; Hero in the Family (1986), TV	NASA	Contemporary
Digger Reed	Astronaut who switches minds with chimpanzee during spaceflight.		
Edward Jupp, Maj. Larry Wahlquist; Newman, Col. (First name not given)	The Krone Experiment (1986), novel	Space Shuttle	Contemporary
Edward Jupp, Maj. Larry Wahlquist; Newman, Col. (First name not given)	Crew of a Space Shuttle on a military mission to capture a Soviet military satellite.		
Morrow (Commander); West; Calahan; Lois Joanne Lane (Journalist); Unnamed astronaut (Note: A mission patch appears with the names of all five crewmembers, but the fifth name is cut off by the edge of the panel.)	The Man of Steel #1 (1986), comic book	NASA: Constitution (spaceplane)	Contemporary/Near Future
Morrow (Commander); West; Calahan; Lois Joanne Lane (Journalist); Unnamed astronaut	Superman's rescue of crashing spaceplane leads to his first meeting with Lois Lane in post-Crisis reality.		
First shuttle mission: Paul Hawkins, Cmdr. (USN) (CDR); Tom Young, Maj. (Ph.D.) (USAF) (PLT); Lisa Morrell, Dr. (Mission Specialist); John Richardson, Maj. (USAF) (Payload Specialist) Second shuttle mission: Paul Hawkins (CDR); Tom Young (PLT); Lisa Morrell (Mission Specialist); Nick Carter [Nicholas J. Huntington Carter] (AXE) (impersonating Richard Chappell, Lt. Col., USAF) (Payload Specialist) Salyut: Sergei (no last name given); Unnamed cosmonaut	Nick Carter-Killmaster; Death Orbit (1986), novel	Space Shuttle; Two shuttle missions Soyuz-Salyut	Contemporary/Near Future (September – October)
First shuttle mission: Paul Hawkins, Cmdr. (USN) (CDR); Tom Young, Maj. (Ph.D.) (USAF) (PLT); Lisa Morrell, Dr. (Mission Specialist); John Richardson, Maj. (USAF) (Payload Specialist) Second shuttle mission: Paul Hawkins (CDR); Tom Young (PLT); Lisa Morrell (Mission Specialist); Nick Carter [Nicholas J. Huntington Carter] (AXE) (impersonating Richard Chappell, Lt. Col., USAF) (Payload Specialist) Salyut: Sergei (no last name given); Unnamed cosmonaut	Secret USAF shuttle missions, the first to launch an Air Force satellite, the second to investigate Richardson's murder during EVA. Salyut is stealth-capable and armed with six nuclear missiles.		
Zach Bergstrom Atlantis: Andie Bergstrom	SpaceCamp (1986), film	Space Shuttle; Atlantis Space Station; Daedalus	Contemporary
Zach Bergstrom Atlantis: Andie Bergstrom	Astronaut camp instructor Andie Bergstrom is accidentally launched into space with a bunch of teenagers.		
Jim Hollis, Cdr. (USN) (CDR); Rachel "Rocky" Garvey, Lt. Col. (USAF) (PLT)	The Wild Blue: The Novel of the U.S. Air Force (1986), novel	Space Shuttle; Constitution (simulator)	Contemporary
Jim Hollis, Cdr. (USN) (CDR); Rachel "Rocky" Garvey, Lt. Col. (USAF) (PLT)	Epilogue features astronauts on simulated Space Shuttle mission.		
Antares: Blacky Moran, Cmdr. (USN) (CDR); Susan York (Co-Pilot); Adrienne Cortez, MS (Brazil); Georgi Mikoyan (USSR); Unnamed Japanese astronaut Unnamed Swedish astronaut Unnamed New Zealander astronaut	Zoboa (1986), novel	Space Shuttle; Antares Space Station; Olympus	Near Future
Antares: Blacky Moran, Cmdr. (USN) (CDR); Susan York (Co-Pilot); Adrienne Cortez, MS (Brazil); Georgi Mikoyan (USSR); Unnamed Japanese astronaut Unnamed Swedish astronaut Unnamed New Zealander astronaut	Islamic extremists try to use stolen nuclear weapons to destroy Cape Canaveral.		
NASA; Chuck Samson Valley Forge: Joe Dover, Cmdr. Bob Ortega, Maj. Brian MacFay, Capt. Unnamed pilot Kosmolyot II (1): Andrian E. Bykovsky, Maj. Kosmolyot II (2): Vladimir M. Koidunov, Col.	Alpha Bug (1987), novel	Space Shuttle; Valley Forge Kosmolyot II	Near Future
NASA; Chuck Samson Valley Forge: Joe Dover, Cmdr. Bob Ortega, Maj. Brian MacFay, Capt. Unnamed pilot Kosmolyot II (1): Andrian E. Bykovsky, Maj. Kosmolyot II (2): Vladimir M. Koidunov, Col.	When a Soviet military spaceplane gets into trouble in orbit the United States sends up a shuttle to investigate. The novel also contains reference to Salyut 9 and an aborted joint US/Soviet space project called Spacelab 5.		
Gordon McAfee, Col. Unnamed astronauts	Cthulhu Now "The Killer Out of Space" (1987), role playing game	Space Shuttle; Atlantis	Contemporary/Near Future (Note: The mission is described as "...the most ambitious of shuttle missions since the disastrous Challenger flight of 1986.")
Gordon McAfee, Col. Unnamed astronauts	While on a two-week mission Atlantis encounters something strange in space forcing an emergency landing in Kansas.		
Ben Woods, Adm. (USN); Richard Seedeck, Cmdr. (USN) (Note: Seedeck is described as having been a crewmember on a previous shuttle mission.); Jerrod Bates; Connors; Matsumo (First names not provided for the last two crew)	Flight of the Old Dog (1987), novel	Space Shuttle; Atlantis	1988 (Note: The 1990 edition of the novel does not contain any specific dating information. The later novel Night of the Hawk has an opening chapter revealing the earlier novel is set in 1988.)
Ben Woods, Adm. (USN); Richard Seedeck, Cmdr. (USN); Jerrod Bates; Connors; Matsumo (First names not provided for the last two crew)	Crew of a military mission to deploy SDI satellites.		
Polaris: Jacqueline "Jackie" Devon, Maj. (USAF); Unnamed CDR; Other unnamed crew	Hitchhiker (1987), short story	Space Shuttle; Polaris	Contemporary/Near Future (Note: Refers to the Space Shuttle Challenger disaster in the past tense.)
Polaris: Jacqueline "Jackie" Devon, Maj. (USAF); Unnamed CDR; Other unnamed crew	The first shuttle launched from Vandenberg Air Force Base has a strange event occur while one of the crew is performing an EVA repair.		
Space Shuttle: Peter Venkman, Dr. Raymond Stantz, Dr. Egon Spengler, Dr. Winston Zeddemore Galileo: Kirov, Capt. Irahqua, Lt. McTavish, Lt. Sato, Lt. Whitney, Yeoman
Space Shuttle: Peter Venkman, Dr. Raymond Stantz, Dr. Egon Spengler, Dr. Winston Zeddemore Galileo: Kirov, Capt. Irahqua, Lt. McTavish, Lt. Sato, Lt. Whitney, Yeoman	The Real Ghostbusters; Ain't NASA-sarily So (1987), TV	Space Shuttle; Experimental Space Platform Galileo	Contemporary/Near Future
The Ghostbusters investigate a haunted space station.
Misha; Two other cosmonauts	Superman IV: The Quest for Peace (1987), film	Soyuz; Salyut?	Contemporary
Misha; Two other cosmonauts	Cosmonauts rescued by Superman.		
Atlantis: Wakeman (CDR); Unnamed American astronauts Kutuzov: Three unnamed cosmonauts	Winter Hawk (1987), novel	Space Shuttle; Atlantis Raketoplan*; Kutuzov	Contemporary/Near Future
Atlantis: Wakeman (CDR); Unnamed American astronauts Kutuzov: Three unnamed cosmonauts	Atlantis is in orbit to rendezvous with a Soviet space shuttle, while the Kutuzov deploys a Soviet laser weapon to destroy Atlantis.		
Bob Campbell Victory: Lawrence Joshua "Law" Kincaid, Col. (USN); Unnamed astronauts	Long Time Coming (1988), novel	Space Shuttle; Victory	Contemporary
Bob Campbell Victory: Lawrence Joshua "Law" Kincaid, Col. (USN); Unnamed astronauts	Kincaid, who signed a peace treaty with Russia in space, discovers he has a teenage son.		
Enterprise: Jerrod Will, Col. (USAF) (CDR); Richard Sontag, Col. (USMC) (PLT); Kevin Baker, Dr. (Mission Specialist); Marty Schultz, Capt. (Space Command) (Payload Specialist); Ann Page, Dr. (Mission Specialist) Armstrong Space Station: Jason "Jas" Saint-Michael, Brig Gen (Commander); Jim Walker, Col. (Vice-commander/deputy commander for operations); Wayne Marks, Col. (Deputy commander for engineering); Jake Jefferson, CMSgt (Chief sensor technician); Bayles (Technician); Davis (Technician); Sean Kelly (Technician); John Montgomery, Amn (Technician); Ted Moyer, Amn (Electronics Technician); Wallis; Yemana America: Jason Saint-Michael, Brig Gen (Pilot); Jonathan Hampton, Col. (Co-pilot); Ken Horvath, Maj. (First officer); Marty Schultz, Capt. (Payload Specialist); Ann Page, Dr. (Payload Specialist) Elektron One: Alesander Govorov, General Lieutenant (promoted to Marshal) Elektron Two: Ivan Voloshin, Col. Elektron Two: Andrei Kozhedub, Col. Elektron Three: Yuri Litvyak, Col.	Silver Tower (1988), novel	Space Shuttles: Enterprise; Atlantis United States Space Command: Armstrong Space Station (aka "Silver Tower"); Hypersonic Transportation System America (spaceplane) Soviet Space Defense Command: Three Elektron spaceplanes	February 1992 – January 1993
American personnel aboard military space station during Soviet invasion of Iran. Enterprise was refitted for spaceflight after Challenger disaster. Govorov was the first Soviet space shuttle cosmonaut.
Discovery: Smokey (CDR); Bob (PLT); Chico (Mission Specialist); Ann (Mission Specialist) (no last names given); Mary Two Hawks [O'Sullivan] (Doctoral candidate) (Passenger to Friendship); William Wong (Canada) (Doctoral candidate) (Passenger to Friendship); Wayne Morrison (Doctoral candidate) (Passenger to Friendship) Friendship: Stu Robinson (USAF) (Station Commander); Beth "Dr. T." Tippett, Dr. (Lead life sciences); Dave (Life sciences) (no last name given); Barnaby "Barney" (Note: Also known as "Barn".) Caldwell, Col. (Earth sciences); Edie White, Ph.D. (Materials processing); David Bishop, Dr. (Astrophysics officer); Sean Finnegan, Dr. (Manager of orbital medicine [MOM]); Mitsue (Japan); Shoji (Japan); Unnamed astronauts Homer: Bobby Dalton; Barney Caldwell Mir: Vladimir (no last name given); Unnamed cosmonauts	Space Station Friendship: A Visit with the Crew in 2007 (1988), novel	Space Shuttle; Discovery Space Station Friendship Homer (Orbital transfer vehicle [OTV]) Mir	2007 (Autumn) (Note: Includes 50th anniversary of Sputnik 1 on October 4.) July 20, 2019
Two Hawks, Wong and Morrison are the first doctoral candidates to visit the space station as part of their thesis work. Robinson is a three-time shuttle veteran. Dalton and Caldwell traveled up to GEO platform aboard OTV. Hermes and HOTOL are also operational in this era. Two Hawks later becomes the first human to give birth on the Moon.
Unnamed astronaut	"Astronauts" (1989), short story	Space Shuttle	Late 1980s (September – Summer)
Unnamed astronaut	Astronaut speaks to high school assembly "in the wake of the Challenger disaster".		
Roger Houston (Commander); Buzz Airfields (Pilot); Joy Rider (Scientist)	Chip 'n Dale Rescue Rangers; Out to Launch (1989), TV	Spaceplane (Single-stage-to-orbit)	Contemporary/Near Future
Roger Houston (Commander); Buzz Airfields (Pilot); Joy Rider (Scientist)	The Rescue Rangers must save an experimental spaceplane after a meteor strike.		
Lowell Crawford, Col. (USAF) (CDR); Henry "Hank" Doherty, Lt. Cmdr. (USN) (PLT); Alan Cresottie (PS); Minh Tran, Dr. (PS); Ward Culdrew, Maj. (USMC) (MS)	Defcon One (1989), novel	Space Shuttle; Columbia	Contemporary/Near Future
Lowell Crawford, Col. (USAF) (CDR); Henry "Hank" Doherty, Lt. Cmdr. (USN) (PLT); Alan Cresottie (PS); Minh Tran, Dr. (PS); Ward Culdrew, Maj. (USMC) (MS)	Astronauts assigned to launch SDI satellites.		
Jason "Einstein" Grant, Col. Ray "The Penetrator" Tanner (Co-pilot)	Moontrap (1989), film	Apollo Space Shuttles: Camelot; Intrepid	Contemporary
Jason "Einstein" Grant, Col. Ray "The Penetrator" Tanner (Co-pilot)	Astronauts using remnant Apollo hardware for a trip to the Moon.		
Discovery: Conrad Williams III (CDR); Joey Wells (United States) (PLT); George Evans (UK); Aelita Zakharov; Vladimir Turnov (USSR); Alex Vonberger (GDR) OV-105: Gerald Bingham (CDR); Brad Parker (PLT); Russell Madlinger (Note: NASA administrator and former Apollo/Skylab astronaut.)	Night Launch (1989), novel	Space Shuttles: Discovery; OV-105	c. 1990
Discovery: Conrad Williams III (CDR); Joey Wells (United States) (PLT); George Evans (UK); Aelita Zakharov; Vladimir Turnov (USSR); Alex Vonberger (GDR) OV-105: Gerald Bingham (CDR); Brad Parker (PLT); Russell Madlinger	A sleeper agent for a Neo-Nazi organization hijacks the space shuttle carrying out the first joint US/USSR space mission since the ASTP, forcing NASA to launch the untested replacement for Challenger on a desperate rescue mission.		
Tucker Wilson, Col. (USAF) (CDR); Fred Hagen (USAF) (PLT); Conners, Capt. (USAF) (Mission Specialist); Miller (USAF) (Mission Specialist); Holmquist (USAF) (Payload Specialist) (First names not given for last three)	Phases of Gravity (1989), novel	Space Shuttle	November 1988
Tucker Wilson, Col. (USAF) (CDR); Fred Hagen (USAF) (PLT); Conners, Capt. (USAF) (Mission Specialist); Miller (USAF) (Mission Specialist); Holmquist (USAF) (Payload Specialist) (First names not given for last three)	Classified Space Shuttle mission carrying Department of Defense payload, possibly based on STS-27. Wilson is an Apollo, Skylab and Space Shuttle veteran.		
Space Shuttle; Five unnamed military astronauts Soyuz 881; Nikolai Sitnikov; Three unnamed cosmonauts	Star Shot (1989), novel (First published as Enemy Territory)	Space Shuttle Soviet Space Shuttle? Soyuz 881	Contemporary
Space Shuttle; Five unnamed military astronauts Soyuz 881; Nikolai Sitnikov; Three unnamed cosmonauts	The Soviet Union attempts to destroy, or if that fails, to steal an experimental SDI satellite.		
Mikhail Suslov: Dmitri Bulganin, Lt. Col. Unnamed co-pilot Intrepid: Frank Mulchahey, Maj. Julian Kapuscinski, Col. Jerry Rodriquez, Dr. Constellation: Philip Heitmann, Lt. Col. (USMC); Jack Townsend, Maj. (USAF); Sandford Watkins, Maj. (United States Army) Soyuz: Vasili Lubinin; Sergi Yemitov Kestrel: Leroy "Mad Dog" Monaghan, Cmdr. (USN); Peter "Hot Rod" Lamborghini, Col.	Storming Intrepid (1989), novel	Soviet Space Shuttle; Mikhail Suslov Space Shuttles: Intrepid; Constellation Soyuz Spaceplane; Kestrel	Contemporary
Mikhail Suslov: Dmitri Bulganin, Lt. Col. Unnamed co-pilot Intrepid: Frank Mulchahey, Maj. Julian Kapuscinski, Col. Jerry Rodriquez, Dr. Constellation: Philip Heitmann, Lt. Col. (USMC); Jack Townsend, Maj. (USAF); Sandford Watkins, Maj. (United States Army) Soyuz: Vasili Lubinin; Sergi Yemitov Kestrel: Leroy "Mad Dog" Monaghan, Cmdr. (USN); Peter "Hot Rod" Lamborghini, Col.	The Soviet Union tries to hijack a Space Shuttle.		
Scott Cartwright, Gen. (USAF)	Target Stealth (1989), novel	X-15 Space Shuttle; Atlantis (Note: Cartwright is stated to have been oldest person to fly into space on his shuttle mission which landed at Edwards Air Force Base.)	Contemporary/Near future
Scott Cartwright, Gen. (USAF)	Iran tries to steal a prototype stealth bomber.		
