= When Heaven Fell =

1995 novel by William Barton

- Cover of the first edition
- Author: William Barton
- Cover artist: Sean Beavers
- Genre: military science fiction novel
- Publisher: Warner Aspect
- Publication date: 1 March 1995
- Publication place: United States
- Media type: Print (mass market paperback)
- Pages: 343
- ISBN: 0-446-60166-7

When Heaven Fell is a 1995 military science fiction novel by William Barton.

Human mercenary Athol Morrison returns to Earth after serving in the legions of the Master Race. After 20 years, his friends and Earth have changed.

== Plot summary ==
Earth has been taken over by the Master Race, a galaxy-spanning empire of artificial intelligences, and the best of Earth’s survivors are recruited into the aliens' army. Athol Morrison has served for 20 years, and heads back to Earth for a brief vacation. There, he runs into old friends, and finds it easy to give into his old feelings with his childhood girlfriend, Alexandra (Alix) Moreno.

Alix and the rest of Athol’s friends are involved in a rebellion against Earth’s Master. They ask Athol to help and to join them, and so he helps to train them. Concerned that any rebellion will provoke a genocidal response from the Masters, he betrays the rebellion to the local government, making sure that Alix and Davy Intäke are spared.

Conflicted about what he has done, but feeling as if there was no choice, Athol rejoins up with his new command. Soon afterward comes war with the Hu, the most advanced race yet encountered—they developed hyperspace travel either on their own or stole it from a Master facility. Despite the Hu winning a series of early victories, the Master Race grinds the Hu down in a near-genocidal campaign that leaves the Hu homeworld in ruins.

After that war is over, Athol and one of his concubines visit his alien comrade Shrêhht on her home planet. There, he is invited into another rebellion, one composed of all of the slave races, that has been plotting against the Master Race for over 100,000 years. He returns to Earth a second time and learns that he and Alix have a daughter, Kaye Moreno, and takes her off-planet to be trained as a soldier herself.

Later, the Master Race's empire is attacked by a new foe that the conspirators believe drove the Master Race out of the Andromeda Galaxy and has arrived to finish them off. Athol, now a general, and Kaye ponder whether now would be the right time for the conspirators to revolt against the Master Race and welcome the newcomers, although he worries that if the Masters fall, the subject races will be the "slaves of slaves" forever.

== Characters ==
- Athol Morrison – Human soldier with the Master Race legions
- Alexandra (Alix) Moreno – Earthling, childhood sweetheart of Athol
- Davy Intäke – Childhood friend of Athol, member of Earth rebellion
- Lank Morrison – Priest and brother to Athol
- Shrêhht – Kkhruhhuft soldier and friend of Athol
- Kaye Moreno - Daughter of Athol and Alix

== Major themes ==
- Alien takeover of earth.
- The lesser of two evils principle when Athol has to decide between betraying his rebel friends or letting the whole human race be wiped out.
- Human sexuality and human sexual behavior are key to the main character.
- Death, sex, and violence.
- Athol Morrison as an anti-hero, even though we are shown his childhood and recent adulthood.
- Master/slave relationship between Master Race and subject races

== Release details ==
- 1995, USA, Aspect books, ISBN 0-446-60166-7, Pub date 1 March 1995, Paperback

== Sources, references, external links, quotations ==
- Review of ‘’When Heaven Fell’’ at The Quern
- Paired review by James Nicoll
- Paired review by Peter D. Tillman
- When Heaven Fell title listing at the Internet Speculative Fiction Database
