= Jake Garn =

American politician, general, and astronaut (born 1932)

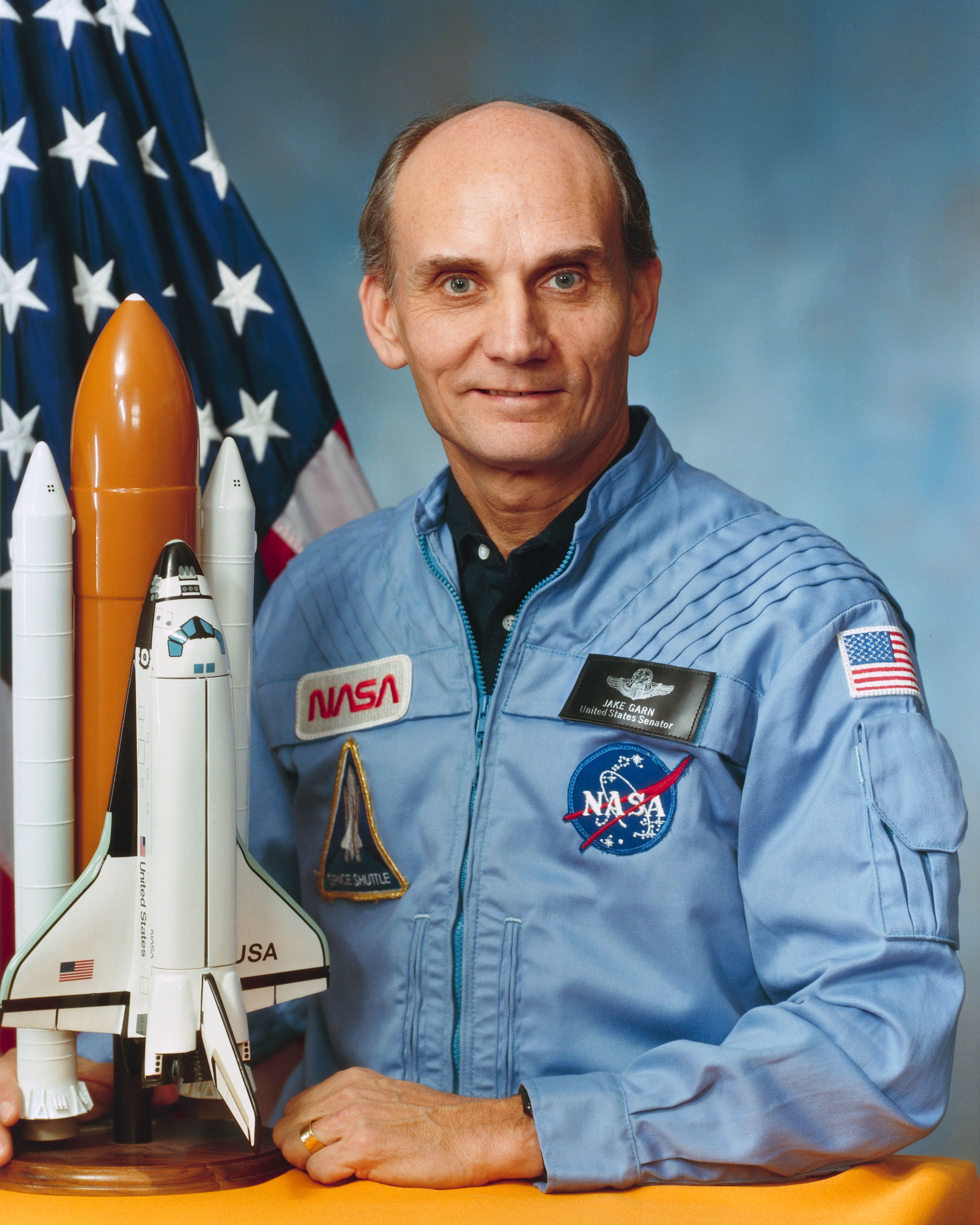

United States Senator from Utah
- In office December 21, 1974 – January 3, 1993
- Preceded by: Wallace F. Bennett
- Succeeded by: Bob Bennett

48th President of the National League of Cities
- In office January 1975 – February 1975
- Preceded by: Tom Bradley
- Succeeded by: Carlos Romero Barceló

28th Mayor of Salt Lake City
- In office December 1972 – December 20, 1974
- Preceded by: J. Bracken Lee
- Succeeded by: Conrad B. Harrison

Personal details
- Born: Edwin Jacob Garn; October 12, 1932 (age 94) Richfield, Utah, U.S.
- Party: Republican
- Spouses: Hazel Thompson (m. 1957; died 1976); Kathleen Brewerton (m. 1977; died 2018)
- Children: 6
- Education: University of Utah (BS)

Military service
- Allegiance: United States
- Branch: United States Navy
- Service years: 1956–1960 (active); 1963–1979 (reserve)
- Unit: Utah Air National Guard
- Space career

NASA payload specialist (Congressional observer)
- Time in space: 6d 23h 55m
- Mission: STS-51-D

Edwin Jacob Garn (born October 12, 1932) is an American military veteran and retired politician from the U.S. state of Utah who served as a member of the United States Senate from 1974 to 1993. Garn became the first sitting member of the United States Congress to fly in space when he flew aboard the Space Shuttle Discovery during STS-51-D in April 1985. Prior to his time in the U.S. Senate, he served as the mayor of Salt Lake City from 1972 to 1974, and is the most recent Republican to serve in the role.

== Early life ==
Garn was born in Richfield, Utah and the son of World War I pilot Ed Garn and the former Agnes Fern Christensen. He is of Danish, English, German, and Norwegian descent.

=== Education ===
He attended East High School, Roosevelt Junior High School, and Uintah Elementary School. He earned a Bachelor of Science degree in business and finance from the University of Utah in 1955, where he was a member of the Sigma Chi fraternity.

== Career ==
Senator Garn is a former insurance executive. He served in the United States Navy as a Martin P5M Marlin pilot. He also served as a pilot of the 151st Air Refueling Group of the Utah Air National Guard, where he flew the Boeing KC-97L and KC-135A. He retired as a colonel in April 1979. He was promoted to brigadier general after his Space Shuttle mission. He had flown 17,000 hours in military aircraft when he flew in space.

=== Early political career ===
Before his election to the Senate, Garn served on the Salt Lake City commission for four years and was elected as the mayor of Salt Lake City in 1971, entering office in 1972. He was the last Republican to hold that office to date. Garn was active in the Utah League of Cities and Towns and served as its president in 1972. In 1974, Garn was the first vice-president of the National League of Cities. The organization, in order to honor Garn, made him its president for the first two months of 1975.

=== U.S. Senate ===
Garn was first elected to the Senate in 1974, succeeding retiring Republican Wallace F. Bennett, father of later U.S. Senate member (and his eventual successor) Bob Bennett. Garn was re-elected to a second term in November 1980 with 74 percent of the vote, the largest victory in a statewide race in Utah history. Garn was re-elected a second time in 1986.

Though strongly pro-life, Garn joined United States House of Representatives member Henry Hyde of Illinois in resigning from the board of the National Pro-Life Political Action Committee when the executive director of the organization, Peter Gemma, issued a "hit list" to target certain lawmakers who supported abortion rights. Garn and Hyde, the author of the Hyde Amendment, which limited abortions financed by Medicaid, said that "hit lists" are counterproductive because they create irrevocable discord among legislators, any of whom can be subject to a "single issue" attack of this kind by one advocacy group or another. Gemma said that he was surprised by the withdrawal of Garn and Hyde from the PAC committee but continued with plans to spend $650,000 for the 1982 elections on behalf of anti-abortion candidates.

Garn was chairman of the United States Senate Committee on Banking, Housing, and Urban Affairs and served on three subcommittees: Housing and Urban Affairs, Financial Institutions, and International Finance and Monetary Policy. He also was a member of the Senate Appropriations Committee and served as chairman of the HUD-Independent Agencies Subcommittee. He served on four other Appropriations subcommittees: Energy and Water Resources, Defense, Military Construction, and Interior. Garn served as a member of the Republican leadership from 1979 to 1984 as secretary of the Republican Conference.

His Institute of Finance has been called a "hot tub of influence peddling".

Garn retired from the Senate in 1992. He is a supporter of the National Popular Vote Interstate Compact.

== Savings and loan ==
As chairman of the Senate Banking Committee, Garn was co-author with U.S. House of Representatives member Fernand St Germain from Rhode Island of the Garn–St. Germain Depository Institutions Act of 1982, the law that partially deregulated the savings and loan industry and attempted to forestall the looming Savings and loan crisis.

== Spaceflight ==
Garn asked to fly on the Space Shuttle because he was head of the Senate appropriations subcommittee that dealt with NASA, and had extensive aviation experience. He had previously flown a Northrop Grumman B-2 Spirit prototype and driven a new Army tank. He began publicly asking NASA about flying on the Shuttle in 1981, and the agency had long planned to fly "citizen passengers" such as artists, journalists, entertainers, and the Teacher in Space Project, but the November 1984 announcement that a member of Congress would go to space surprised most observers. Garn said that flying on the Shuttle would be a fact-finding trip: "I do really think that it is a necessity that Congressmen check things out that they vote for and make certain that funds are being spent adequately. It might be necessary to have a Senator kick the tire".

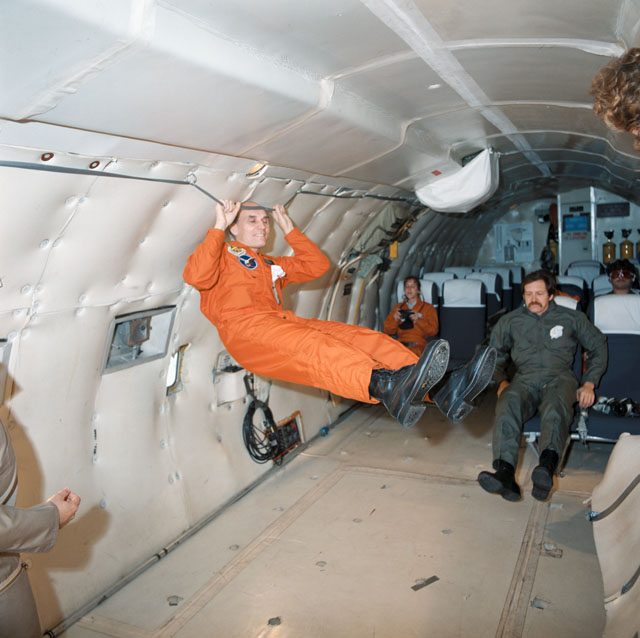
Garn in 1985

STS-51-D was launched from and returned to land at the Kennedy Space Center in the U.S. state Florida in April 1985. Its primary objective was to deploy two communications satellites, and to perform electrophoresis and echocardiograph operations in space in addition to a number of other experiments. As a payload specialist, Garn's role on the mission was as a congressional observer and as a subject for medical experiments on space adaptation syndrome. At the conclusion of the mission, Garn had traveled over 2.5 million miles (4.0 million kilometers) in 108 Earth orbits, logging over 167 hours in space.

The space sickness Garn experienced during the journey was so severe that a scale for space sickness was jokingly based on him, where "one Garn" is the highest possible level of sickness. Some NASA astronauts who opposed the payload specialist program, such as Mike Mullane, believed that Garn's space sickness was evidence of the inappropriateness of flying people with little training. Garn was in excellent physical condition, however, and began flying at the age of 16. Astronaut Charles Bolden described Garn as "the ideal candidate to do it, because he was a veteran Navy combat pilot who had more flight hours than anyone in the Astronaut Office". Fellow 51-D payload specialist Charles Walker—who also suffered from space sickness on the flight despite having flown before—stated that:

He worked out extraordinarily well, and quite frankly, I think the U.S. space program, NASA, has benefited a lot from both his experience and his firsthand relation of NASA and the program back on Capitol Hill. As a firsthand participant in the program, he brought tremendous credibility back to Capitol Hill, and that's helped a lot. He's always been a friend of the agency and its programs.

=== Legacy ===
The Jake Garn Mission Simulator and Training Facility, NASA's prime training facility for astronauts in the Shuttle and Space Station programs, is named after him.

Upon his return, he co-wrote the 1989 novel Night Launch. The book centers around terrorists taking control of the Space Shuttle Discovery during the first NASA–USSR Space Shuttle flight.

== Personal life ==
Garn first married Hazel Rhae Thompson on February 2, 1957 in the town of Biloxi, Mississippi. Together, they had four children: Jacob, Susan, Ellen, and Jeffrey. Hazel was killed in a car crash in Cheyenne County, Nebraska, on August 17, 1976. On April 8, 1977, he then married Kathleen Brewerton, who had a son, Brook, from a previous marriage at Salt Lake Temple. Jake and Kathleen had two children together, Matthew and Jennifer. Kathleen died on May 31, 2018. He is a member of the Church of Jesus Christ of Latter-day Saints.

In 1986, Garn donated a kidney to his 27-year-old daughter, Susan, who was experiencing progressive kidney failure as a result of diabetes.

Political offices
Preceded by J. Bracken Lee	Mayor of Salt Lake City; 1972–1974	Succeeded by Conrad B. Harrison
Party political offices
Preceded by Wallace F. Bennett	Republican nominee for U.S. Senator from Utah (Class 3); 1974, 1980, 1986	Succeeded by Bob Bennett
Preceded by Clifford Hansen	Vice Chair of the Senate Republican Conference; 1979–1985	Succeeded by Thad Cochran
U.S. Senate
Preceded by Wallace F. Bennett	U.S. Senator (Class 3) from Utah; 1974–1993; Served alongside: Frank Moss, Orrin Hatch	Succeeded by Bob Bennett
Preceded by Edward Brooke	Ranking Member of the Senate Banking Committee; 1979–1981	Succeeded by Harrison A. Williams
Preceded by William Proxmire	Chair of the Senate Banking Committee; 1981–1987	Succeeded by William Proxmire
Preceded by William Proxmire	Ranking Member of the Senate Banking Committee; 1987–1993	Succeeded by Al D'Amato
U.S. order of precedence (ceremonial)
Preceded by Larry Craig as Former U.S. Senator	Order of precedence of the United States as Former U.S. Senator	Succeeded by Dennis DeConcini as Former U.S. Senator
