= William Barton (writer) =

American science fiction writer

- Born: September 28, 1950 (age 75); U.S.
- Occupation: Novelist
- Writing career
- Genre: Science fiction
- Notable work: When Heaven Fell

William Renald Barton III (born September 28, 1950) is an American science fiction writer. In addition to his standalone novels, he is also known for collaborations with Michael Capobianco. Many of their novels deal with themes such as the Cold War, space travel, and space opera.

Barton also has written short stories that put an emphasis on sexuality and human morality in otherwise traditional science fiction. His short fiction has appeared in Asimov's and Sci Fiction, and has been nominated for the Hugo Award, the Theodore Sturgeon Award, the Sidewise Award, and the HOMer Award, and three of his novels (The Transmigration of Souls, Acts of Conscience, and When We Were Real) were finalists for the Philip K. Dick Award with Acts of Conscience winning a special citation in 1998.

Barton has recently begun to self-publish his fiction for the Kindle.

== Bibliography ==
- Hunting on Kunderer; August 1973, ISBN 0-441-48245-7. On a jungle world populated by dinosaur-like predators, a group of hunters must deal with deadly beasts, sabotage, and an alien studying human sexuality.
- A Plague of All Cowards; August 1976, ISBN 0-441-66780-5. Zoltan Tharkie, a professional space pirate, is hired by the government of human civilization to track down an assassin.
- Dark Sky Legion; August 1992, ISBN 0-553-29616-7. An eternally young, millennia-old man in a far-future star empire is faced with difficult decisions about whether or not to destroy a planet in order to preserve the status quo.
- Yellow Matter; December 1993, no ISBN. Signed and numbered chapbook published by TAL Publications, Leesburg, VA. A man sexually harassed by an alien creature eventually comes to prefer being treated as a sex object for this species.
- When Heaven Fell; March 1995, ISBN 0-446-60166-7. A human mercenary for powerful alien conquerors returns to an enslaved Earth while on leave, finding a people both apathetic and desperate.
- The Transmigration of Souls; January 1996, ISBN 0-446-60167-5. A portal on the moon leads a team of international scientists—and the American soldiers sent to stop them—to alternate realities.
- Acts of Conscience; January 1997, ISBN 0-446-67251-3. A specialist mechanic acquires an FTL spaceship, discovers ominous signs on a colony world, and plays a part in the decision of whether or not to wipe out humanity for the sake of other species.
- When We Were Real; June 1999, ISBN 0-446-60706-1. Darius Murphy escapes an oppressive religious matriarchy to find love and war in the darkness between the stars.

By Barton and Michael Capobianco

- Iris, February 1990, ISBN 0-385-26727-4. A wandering gas giant and its moons hold awesome alien secrets for a group of dissatisfied colonists.
- Fellow Traveler, July 1991, ISBN 0-553-29115-7. The United States and the USSR squabble over the dangers and rewards of asteroid mining during the Cold War.
- Alpha Centauri, July 1997, ISBN 0-380-79282-6. A terrorist plague endangers an exploration ship; the leavings of ancient aliens suggest it might not matter whether they save themselves or not.
- White Light, October 1998, ISBN 0-380-79516-7. Two families travel to the heart of the universe and find a Tipleresque heaven.
