= Science Fiction and Fantasy Writers Association =

Nonprofit organization

- Science Fiction and Fantasy Writers of America
- Founded: 1965
- Founder: Damon Knight
- Type: Advocacy group, trade association
- Legal status: 501(c)(3)
- Purpose: SFWA informs, supports, promotes, defends and advocates for its members.
- Headquarters: Enfield, Connecticut
- Region served: Worldwide
- Members: Approx. 2,500 members
- President: Kate Ristau
- Website: sfwa.org

The Science Fiction and Fantasy Writers of America, doing business as Science Fiction and Fantasy Writers Association and commonly known as SFWA (/ˈsɪfwə/ or /ˈsɛfwə/) is a nonprofit 501(c)(3) organization of professional science fiction and fantasy writers. While SFWA is based in the United States, its membership is open to writers worldwide. The organization was founded in 1965 by Damon Knight under the name Science Fiction Writers of America.

As of 2025, SFWA has about 2,500 members worldwide.

Active SFWA members may vote for the Nebula Awards, one of the principal English-language science fiction awards.

== Mission ==
SFWA informs, supports, promotes, defends and advocates for its members.

SFWA activities include informing science fiction and fantasy writers on professional matters, protecting their interests, and helping them deal effectively with agents, editors, anthologists, and producers in print and non-print media; encouraging public interest in and appreciation for science fiction and fantasy literature; sponsoring, editing, and disseminating writings, papers, books, pamphlets, and other publications which exemplify science fiction and fantasy literature of high quality; conducting conferences, public discussion groups, forums, lectures, and seminar programs; and furnishing services connected with this stated purpose.

== History ==
Science Fiction Writers of America, Inc. was founded in 1965 by Damon Knight in association with a group of writers connected to the Milford Conference, which he also headed. According to Todd McCaffrey, the organization immediately "acquired great status in its efforts to help J.R.R. Tolkien get fair recompense in America for pirated sales of The Lord of the Rings". In 1991, the name of the organization was changed to Science Fiction and Fantasy Writers of America, to reflect the fact that the organization had always included writers working in multiple genres. After the name change, both SFWA and SFFWA were used as acronyms. The acronym SFWA was re-established officially in 1996.

In 1973, SFWA awarded an honorary membership to Polish author Stanisław Lem. Some SFWA members, notably Philip José Farmer, were incensed by Lem's negative opinions of American science fiction, while others opposed Lem's membership because he lived in a Communist country. As a result, in 1976 SFWA rescinded Lem's membership. Several members protested that decision, notably Ursula K. Le Guin, who resigned her membership and refused the Nebula Award for Best Novelette for The Diary of the Rose.

In 1982, Lisa Tuttle withdrew her short story "The Bone Flute" from the final Nebula ballot, to protest what she saw as excessive campaigning for awards and that voters did not receive copies of nominated works. Her withdrawal was sent after voting had been completed. When informed she had won, she contacted SFWA and told them she refused to accept it. She was told that her reasons for doing so would be announced. Her publisher accepted the award in her place, apparently with no knowledge of her withdrawal, and there was no mention of her objection.

In September 2009, SFWA joined the Open Book Alliance to oppose the Google Book Settlement. As a party to the class action suit, SFWA had recently explained its reservations about the settlement and declared its intention to file an objection.

In 2013, the SFWA Bulletin was the subject of a controversy about sexism (see below). This led to a brief hiatus, followed by a reboot of the magazine.

In 2014, the original Massachusetts corporation was dissolved, and SFWA reincorporated as a California nonprofit 501(c)(3) organization with new bylaws.

In 2022, the organization filed to do business as the Science Fiction and Fantasy Writers Association to reflect the participation of their non-US members.

== Activities ==
SFWA participates in various trade shows and publishing industry events in the United States and abroad, including BookExpo America, the American Library Association Midwinter Conference, the USA Science & Engineering Festival, and several major (and minor) science fiction, fantasy and media conventions. SFWA holds a semi-annual business meeting at the World Science Fiction Convention (Worldcon) when it is held in North America, and at the North American Science Fiction Convention (NASFiC) otherwise.

SFWA also hosts its own events, which include:

- The SFWA Nebula Conference is held annually. The main event is a banquet, during which the Nebula Award winners are announced and presented. Other events include a semi-annual SFWA business meeting and a mass autographing session for member authors, which is open to the public. In recent years, the conference also has also offered an extensive program of panels and workshops for professional writers. Prior to 2014, the conference was known as the Nebula Awards Weekend. It has been held in different cities throughout the United States.
- The SFWA Reception in New York was an annual reception in New York to provide SFWA members the opportunity to meet and socialize with editors, agents, publicists, art directors and other publishing industry professionals. Over the years, the reception went by several names, including Authors and Editors, Mill and Swill, and the NY Reception. The event was put on hold in 2015 because of rising costs.
- The SFWA Reading Series encompasses free local events during which SFWA authors read or discuss their fiction with members of the community. As of 2026, events are held in Baltimore, Brooklyn, and New York City. Previously, events were held in several more cities across the US and Canada, but most were cancelled in 2020 due to the COVID-19 pandemic and have not been revived.

== Advocacy and support ==
As an organization, SFWA acts as an advocate to effect important changes within the publishing industry, especially among publishers of science fiction and fantasy, by promoting author-friendly copyright legislation, equitable treatment of authors, and fair contract terms.

=== Writer Beware ===
SFWA sponsors Writer Beware, whose mission is to track, expose, and raise awareness of the prevalence of fraud and other questionable activities in and around the publishing industry. Writer Beware exists as a subpage of the SFWA website, which provides the latest information on literary schemes, scams, and pitfalls; the Writer Beware blog, which provides the latest information on literary schemes, scams, and pitfalls; the Writer Beware blog, which provides up-to-the-minute information on specific scams and schemes, along with advice for writers and industry news and commentary; and the Writer Beware Facebook page, which posts links to articles, news items, and warnings of interest to writers, and provides a forum for discussion. Writer Beware receives the support of the Mystery Writers of America and the Horror Writers Association.

Writer Beware maintains an extensive database of complaints on questionable literary agents, publishers, independent editors, writers’ services, contests, publicity services, and others, and offers a free research and information service for writers. Writer Beware staff assist law enforcement agencies with investigations of literary fraud, and have been instrumental in the convictions of several literary scammers.

=== Griefcom ===
Griefcom, or the Grievance Committee, is formed of member volunteers who undertake to mediate writer disputes and grievances between member writers and their publishers.

=== Emergency Medical Fund ===
SFWA's Emergency Medical Fund was established to assist eligible writers who have unexpected medical expenses.

=== Legal Fund ===
SFWA's Legal Fund was established to create loans for eligible member writers who have writing-related court costs and other related legal expenses.

=== Estate Project ===
Founded by longtime SFWA member Bud Webster, the Estate Project is now headed by Mishell Baker. It maintains a list of the estates of deceased SFWA member writers and coordinates with living member writers to make arrangements for their future estates. The Estate Project also accumulates information about authors' archives for member writers, living or dead.

== Awards ==
- Nebula Awards: Since 1965, SFWA Active and Lifetime Active members select by vote the Nebula Awards for best short story, novelette, novella, and novel published during the previous year, where the four categories are defined by number of words. In 2018, a fifth category for game writing was added.
- Damon Knight Memorial Grand Master Award: Since 1975, the Damon Knight Memorial Grand Master Award has been awarded for lifetime achievement in science fiction or fantasy.
- Ray Bradbury Award: Since 1992, the Ray Bradbury Award has been selected by a vote and presented for best dramatic presentation. Named in honor of Ray Bradbury.
- Author Emeritus: From 1995 to 2009, the Author Emeritus title was awarded to a senior writer "in the genres of science fiction and fantasy who made significant contributions to our field but who are no longer active or whose excellent work may no longer be as widely known as it once was".
- Andre Norton Award: Since 2005, the Andre Norton Award has been selected by a vote and presented for the best young adult or middle grade novel. Named in honor of Andre Norton.
- Kevin O'Donnell Jr. Award for Service to SFWA: Since 1995, presented to recognize service to the organization. Named in honor of Kevin O'Donnell Jr. in 2009 because of his exemplary service to the organization.
- Kate Wilhelm Solstice Award: Since 2009, SFWA has presented the Solstice Award, which recognizes lifetime contributions to the science fiction and fantasy field. The award can be given to up to three people, but is usually given to one living person and one deceased person. In 2016, the award was renamed the Kate Wilhelm Solstice Award.
- Infinity Award: Since 2023, SFWA has presented the Infinity Award, which posthumously recognizes "acclaimed creators who passed away before they could be considered for a Damon Knight Memorial Grand Master Award".

== Publications ==
=== The SFWA Bulletin ===
Front cover of no. 200 (Winter 2013), the issue that sparked the 2013 controversy

Front cover of SFWA Bulletin no. 203 (Winter 2014), the first issue after reform

The SFWA Bulletin is a quarterly magazine that SFWA members receive as part of their membership, but it is also available (by subscription) to non-members. The Bulletin carries nonfiction articles of general interest to writers, especially science fiction and fantasy writers. It accepts submissions, for which the pay rate is 8 cents a word. The Bulletin editor beginning in 2016 was Neil Clarke.

In 2013, a controversy about sexism in the Bulletin led to the resignation of editor Jean Rabe on June 5, 2013. More than 50 authors wrote blog posts in objection to comments by longtime contributors Mike Resnick and Barry N. Malzberg that included references to "lady editors" and "lady writers" who were "beauty pageant beautiful" or a "knock out", an article by C. J. Henderson praising Barbie for maintaining "quiet dignity the way a woman should", and the "exploitative" cover image of no. 200 of the Bulletin depicting a woman in a chain-mail bikini. Several authors used the occasion to speak out against sexism in science fiction genre circles more broadly. The controversy continued through Bulletin no. 202, which contained another column by Resnick and Malzberg, discussing the response to their earlier column. Their column framed that response as censorship, referring to their critics as "liberal fascists". In February 2014, a proposal to establish an advisory board to oversee content was met by a petition circulated by editor and critic Dave Truesdale supporting freedom of speech in the Bulletin.

As a result of the controversy, SFWA president John Scalzi apologized to members, and the Bulletin was put on hiatus for six months. It reappeared with the Winter 2014 Special Issue, #203, but has been on a reduced schedule, publishing an average of two issues per year.

The special issue was edited by Tansy Rayner Roberts and Jaym Gates and "was specially created to be used as an outreach tool for conventions and other events". The issue's contents and cover were welcomed by some as an antidote to the perceived sexism of past issues though Sue Granquist felt that something looked "suspiciously like a woman in a burka".

=== The Forum Binary ===
The Forum Binary is a biannual publication that functions as SFWA's internal publication of record for members. As such, it is not available to non-members.

=== The SFWA Blog ===
SFWA also publishes short essays and other content relevant to writers on the SFWA Blog.

== Membership ==
Most members live in the United States but membership is open to qualifying writers worldwide. Authors, regardless of nationality or residence, must be professionally published in a qualifying market as listed by SFWA to become SFWA members. At present, all listed qualifying markets publish only in the English language.

- Full Members: For authors whose total catalog of paid work in science fiction, fantasy, or related genres equals or exceeds an industry standard set by the SFWA board. The standard is currently $1000 in total earnings from their fiction.
- Associates: For authors whose total catalog of paid work in science fiction, fantasy, or related genres equals or exceeds $100 in payments.
- Affiliates: for industry professionals in science fiction or fantasy (such as academics, editors, agents, artists, graphic novelists, reviewers, etc.) who are not eligible to become an Active or Associate member, and organizations which have a legitimate interest in science fiction and fantasy (such as high schools, colleges, universities, libraries, and similar institutions, as well as broadcasting organizations, film producers, futurology groups and similar organizations).
- Life: for Active members in good standing who paid lifetime dues. Discontinued new Life memberships in 2008.
- Senior: for Active members who have maintained continuous membership for thirty (30) years or more.
- Family/Group: for two or more Active, Associate, or Affiliate members living at the same address.

Dues for most member categories are $100 annually.

== Presidents ==
SFWA presidents have been:

- Damon Knight (1965–1967)
- Robert Silverberg (1967–1968)
- Alan E. Nourse (1968–1969)
- Gordon R. Dickson (1969–1971)
- James E. Gunn (1971–1972)
- Poul Anderson (1972–1973)
- Jerry Pournelle (1973–1974)
- Frederik Pohl (1974–1976)
- Andrew J. Offutt (1976–1978)
- Jack Williamson (1978–1980)
- Norman Spinrad (1980–1982)
- Marta Randall (1982–1984)
- Charles Sheffield (1984–1986)
- Jane Yolen (1986–1988)
- Greg Bear (1988–1990)
- Ben Bova (1990–1992)
- Joe Haldeman (1992–1994)
- Barbara Hambly (1994–1996)
- Michael Capobianco (1996–1998)
- Robert J. Sawyer (1998)
- Paul Levinson (1998–2001)
- Norman Spinrad (2001–2002)
- Sharon Lee (2002–2003)
- Catherine Asaro (2003–2005)
- Robin Wayne Bailey (2005–2007)
- Michael Capobianco (2007–2008)
- Russell Davis (2008–2010)
- John Scalzi (2010–2013)
- Steven Gould (2013–2015)
- Cat Rambo (2015–2019)
- Mary Robinette Kowal (2019–2021)
- Jeffe Kennedy (2021–2024)
- Kate Ristau (2024-)
