= 1986 United States Senate election in Utah =

- November 4, 1986
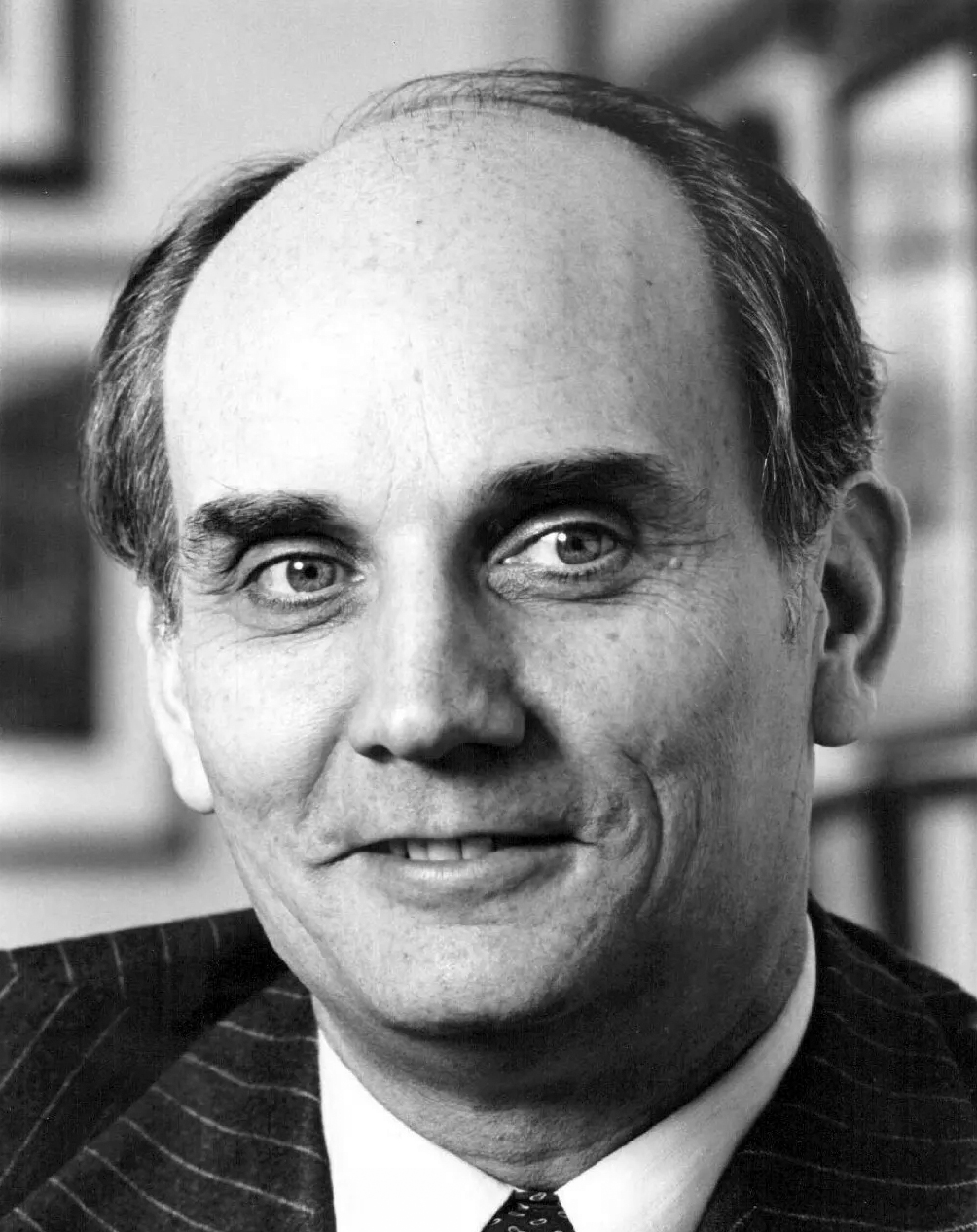

Nominee	Jake Garn	Craig S. Oliver
Party	Republican	Democratic
Popular vote	314,608	115,523
Percentage	72.31%	26.55%
- County results Garn: 60–70% 70–80% 80–90% Oliver: 50–60%
U.S. senator before election
Jake Garn
Republican
Elected U.S. Senator
Jake Garn
Republican

The 1986 United States Senate election in Utah took place on November 4, 1986, concurrently with other elections to the United States Senate and United States House of Representatives as well as various state and local elections. Republican Jake Garn won re-election.

== Major Candidates ==
=== Democratic ===
- Craig S. Oliver, real estate agent

=== Republican ===
- Jake Garn, incumbent Senator

== Results ==
1986 United States Senate election in Utah
Party	Candidate	Votes	%	±%
Republican	Jake Garn (Incumbent)	314,608	72.31%	
Democratic	Craig S. Oliver	115,523	26.55%	
Libertarian	Hugh A. Butler	3,023	0.69%	
Socialist Workers	Mary Zins	1,863	0.43%	
None	Write-Ins	94	0.02%	
Majority		199,085	45.76%	
Turnout		435,111		
Republican hold		Swing		

== See also ==
- 1986 United States Senate elections
