= 1980 United States Senate election in Utah =

- November 4, 1980
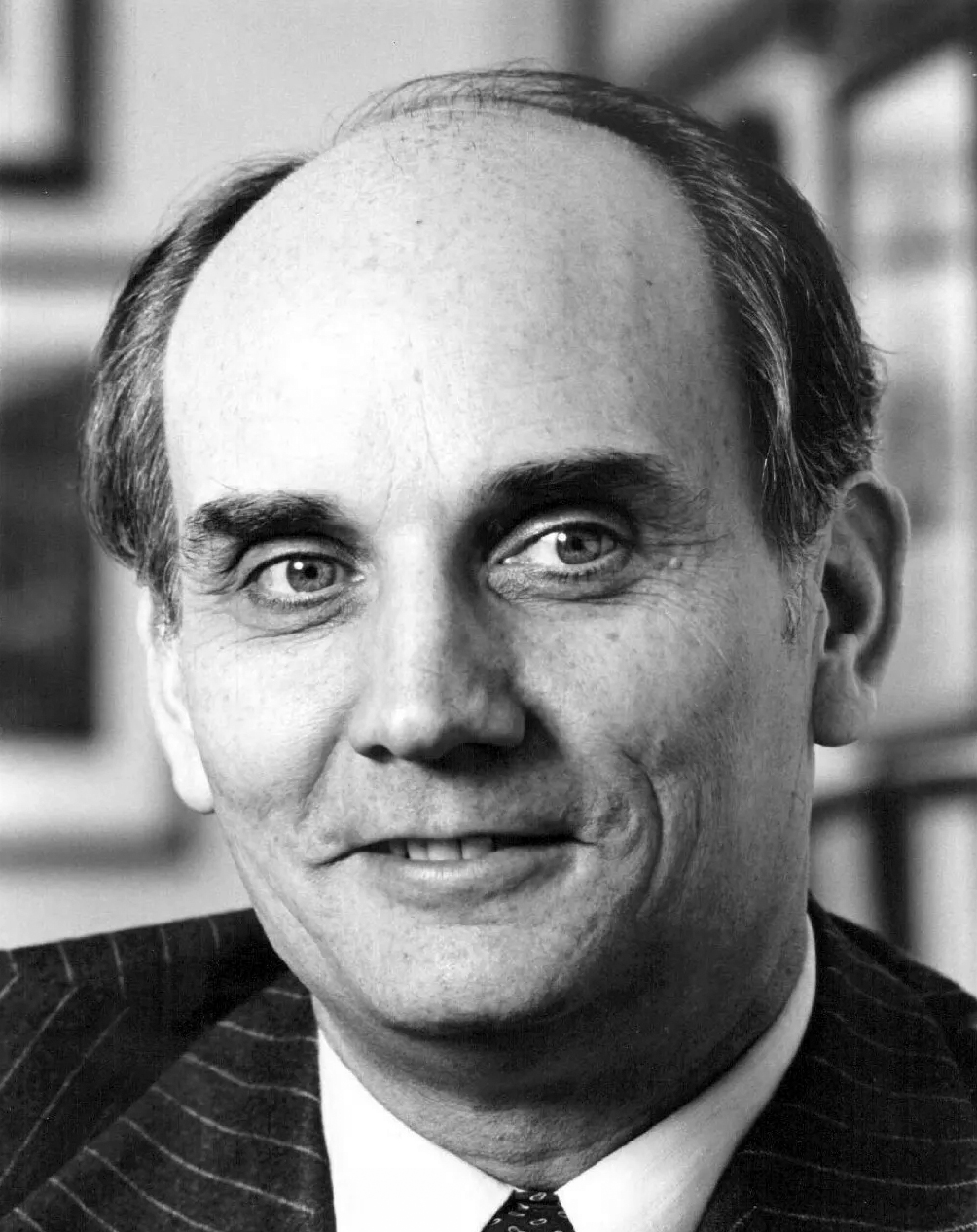

Nominee	Jake Garn	Dan Berman
Party	Republican	Democratic
Popular vote	437,675	151,454
Percentage	73.65%	25.49%
- County results Garn: 60–70% 70–80% 80–90% Berman: 50–60%
U.S. senator before election
Jake Garn
Republican
Elected U.S. Senator
Jake Garn
Republican

American Party primary results by county Batchelor: 50–60%; 60–70%; 70–80%; 80–90%; 100%; Topham: 50–60%; 60–70%; 80–90%; 100%; Tie

Democratic primary results by county Berman: 50–60%; 60–70%; Dirks: 50–60%; 60–70%; 70–80%

The 1980 United States Senate election in Utah took place on November 4, 1980.

Incumbent Republican U.S. Senator Jake Garn won re-election to a second term in a landslide against Democrat Dan Berman.

== American Party primary ==
=== Candidates ===
- George M. Batchelor
- Lawrence Rey Topham

=== Results ===
American Senate primary
Party	Candidate	Votes	%
American	George M. Batchelor	675	54.52%
American	Lawrence Rey Topham	563	45.48%
Total votes		1,238	100.00%

After losing the primary, Topham became the American Party nominee for Governor of Utah.

== Democratic primary ==
=== Candidates ===
- Dan Berman, attorney
- A. Stephen Dirks, Mayor of Ogden

=== Results ===
Democratic Senate primary
Party	Candidate	Votes	%
Democratic	Dan Berman	28,930	50.25%
Democratic	A. Stephen Dirks	28,643	49.75%
Total votes		57,573	100.00%

== General election ==
=== Results ===
1980 United States Senate election in Utah
Party	Candidate	Votes	%	±%
Republican	Jake Garn (incumbent)	437,675	73.65%	▲23.65
Democratic	Dan Berman	151,454	25.49%	▼18.58
Independent	Bruce Bangerter	3,186	0.54%	N/A
American	George M. Batchelor	3,186	0.54%	▼5.50
Total votes		595,501	100.00%	

== See also ==
- 1980 United States Senate elections
