= Night Launch =

1989 novel by Jake Garn

- First edition
- Author: Stephen Paul Cohen and Jake Garn
- Language: English
- Published: 1989 (William Morrow & Co)
- Publication place: United States
- ISBN: 978-0688067175

Night Launch is a 1989 novel co-written by former US Senator and astronaut Jake Garn and Stephen Paul Cohen about terrorists taking over a Space Shuttle.

== Reception ==
Publishers Weekly panned Night Launch and said the book had a weak plot alongside forced character conversations.
