= Michael Capobianco =

American science fiction writer

Michael Victor Capobianco (born November 12, 1950) is an American science fiction writer.

Capobianco wrote four novels jointly with William Barton. The books were published during the 1990s. The books address themes such as the Cold War, space travel, and space opera.

Capobianco served as President of Science Fiction and Fantasy Writers of America (SFWA) from 1996 to 1998 and again from 2007 to 2008. He received the Service to SFWA Award in 2004.

He was married to the late science fiction author, Ann C. Crispin.

== Works ==
- Burster; July 1990. (ISBN 0-553-28543-2). Young man on colony ship sent back to Earth after mysterious radio silence.
- Purlieu; August 2017. (ISBN 978-1947157002).

By William Barton and Capobianco

- Iris, February 1990 (ISBN 0-385-26727-4) SF novel of colonists' lives on a wandering gas giant.
- Fellow Traveler, July 1991 (ISBN 0-553-29115-7). SF novel of U.S./Soviet conflict over space travel.
- Alpha Centauri, July 1997 (ISBN 0-380-79282-6). Terrorists plague a colony ship that is mankind's last hope.
- White Light, October 1998 (ISBN 0-380-79516-7). Two families travel to the heart of the universe and find a Tipleresque heaven.
