= Ellen MacGregor =

American novelist

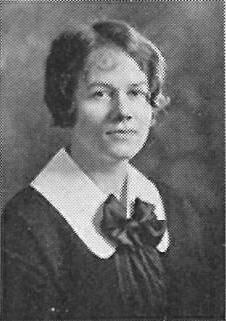
- Born: May 15, 1906; Baltimore
- Died: March 29, 1954; Chicago
- Occupations: Librarian, science fiction writer

Ellen MacGregor (May 15, 1906 – March 29, 1954) was an American children's writer. She is known best for the Miss Pickerell series of children's novels.

== Life ==
She was born in Baltimore, Maryland, to George Malcolm MacGregor and Charlotte Genevieve Noble MacGregor. and was educated in schools in Garfield and Kent, Washington. She attended the University of Washington in Seattle, receiving a Bachelor of Science in library science in 1926. She did postgraduate work in science at the University of California, Berkeley. She worked in numerous libraries and wrote several well-received children's books and magazine articles. She died in 1954 at the age of 47.

== Library career ==
Ellen MacGregor spent part of her career as a librarian. She worked in elementary schools of the Central Hawaii School district and as a cataloguer in the Hilo Library in Hawaii. In Chicago, she supervised the compilation of the Union Catalog of Art, was a research librarian at International Harvester, served as the serials librarian of the Chicago Undergraduate Division of the University of Illinois and was an editor of the Illinois Woman's Press Association monthly bulletin, Pen Points. She worked in Florida as a librarian at the Naval Operating Base in Key West, and organized and administered the library at the Naval Air Technical Training Center. She did research in children's literature for Scott, Foresman, and Company.

== Writing career ==
MacGregor began to write for publication in 1946. A story that she submitted at that time for a class at the Midwestern Writers Conference was later published as the book Tommy and the Telephone. The first appearance of Miss Pickerell, her famous and quirky major character, was in the short story "Swept Her into Space", published in Liberty during 1950. She expanded it to book length, published in 1951 as Miss Pickerell Goes to Mars, a science fiction novel for children. MacGregor's goal was to provide fantasy literature with correct (for the time) scientific facts that would appeal to children. Miss Pickerell was well received by critics, such as Virginia Kirkus, who wrote: "A lively novelty. Fact and fancy in a new venture for this age group." It was also released as the initial selection of the new Weekly Reader Children's Book Club. Three other Miss Pickerell adventures followed before MacGregor's early death.

Besides these books, many of MacGregor's stories appeared in magazines of that period, such as Story World, The Instructor, and Christian Home.

== Published books ==
=== Written by MacGregor ===
- Tommy and the Telephone, illustrated by Zabeth (Chicago: Whitman, 1947)
- Miss Pickerell Goes to Mars, illus. Paul Galdone (New York: McGraw-Hill, 1951); (London: Blackie and Son, 1957)
- Miss Pickerell and the Geiger Counter, illus. Galdone (McGraw Hill, 1953); (Blackie, 1958)
- Miss Pickerell Goes Undersea, illus. Galdone (McGraw Hill, 1953); (Blackie, 1959)

The fourth Miss Pickerell story and three others written by MacGregor were published by McGraw-Hill after her death.

- Miss Pickerell Goes to the Arctic, illus. Galdone (McGraw-Hill, 1954); (Blackie, 1960)
- Theodore Turtle, illus. Galdone (McGraw-Hill, 1955); (London: Faber, 1956)
- Mr. Ferguson of the Fire Department, illus. Galdone (McGraw-Hill, 1956)
- Mr. Pringle and Mr. Buttonhouse, illus. Galdone (McGraw-Hill, 1957)

=== Miss Pickerell extended ===
Eleven Miss Pickerell books were published as by Ellen MacGregor and Dora Pantell; that is, credited to co-authors.

After MacGregor's death in 1954, McGraw-Hill searched unsuccessfully for someone to continue the series until 1964, when they selected Dora Pantell, a social worker, and a writer of publicity and educational curricula. In addition to children's books, Pantell wrote numerous textbooks and manuals, mainly on teaching of English as a second language. Since the later books of the series deal with issues or themes that did not exist or were not apparent during MacGregor's lifetime (energy crisis, computers, artificial satellites), it seems clear that Ms. Pantell was continuing "in the spirit" of Ellen MacGregor and Miss Pickerell.

These 11 books were all published by McGraw-Hill and illustrated by Charles Geer:

- Miss Pickerell on the Moon, by Ellen MacGregor and Dora Pantell, illus. Geer (McGraw Hill, 1965)
- Miss Pickerell Goes on a Dig (1966)
- Miss Pickerell Harvests the Sea (1968)
- Miss Pickerell and the Weather Satellite (1971)
- Miss Pickerell Meets Mr. H.U.M. (1971)
- Miss Pickerell Takes the Bull by the Horns (1976)
- Miss Pickerell to the Earthquake Rescue (1977)
- Miss Pickerell and the Supertanker (1978)
- Miss Pickerell Tackles the Energy Crisis (1980)
- Miss Pickerell on the Trail (1982)
- Miss Pickerell and the Blue Whales (1983)

=== By Dora Pantell ===
A different New York publisher, Franklin Watts, issued the last two stories as by Dora Pantell alone, with the statement "Series originated by Ellen MacGregor."

- Miss Pickerell and the War of the Computers, by Pantell, illus. Charles Geer (F. Watts, 1986)
- Miss Pickerell and the Lost World, by Pantell, illus. Geer. (F. Watts, 1986)

== Miss Pickerell series ==
MacGregor is best known as an author from the Miss Pickerell children's science fiction series. Only four were published in her lifetime. She left sufficient notes on planned future novels to enable Dora Pantell to write and publish Miss Pickerell books, the last one, Miss Pickerell and the Lost World, appearing in 1986.

The series resembles others that are written by other writers long after the deaths of their creators, such as Tom Swift and Nancy Drew. But only one other author has written in the Miss Pickerell "universe" for publication, Dora Pantell, who was also responsible for bringing other Ellen MacGregor-conceived projects to completion.

Later writers who indicated that Miss Pickerell had been either an influence or a favorite include such authors as Harry Turtledove, Susan Page Davis, and Sam Riddleburger.

=== Science in Miss Pickerell ===
MacGregor included valid scientific facts in her Miss Pickerell books. Some of the topics she addressed were weightlessness in space travel, atomic energy and carbon-14 dating, nuclear-powered submarines and the continental shelf, the "bends" affecting divers who surface too rapidly, and many others.

To Mars, to the Arctic, above the ground or below, Miss Pickerell is dauntless, intrepid, and eager. It's all good fun, but with a bonus. The scientific basis of each of the Miss Pickerell stories is scrupulously accurate. Although she was careful not to overburden her fragile plots with didactic passages explaining gravity, radiation, etc. Ellen MacGregor managed very skillfully to incorporate a good deal of information that a child reader could absorb almost without realizing it. With rare judgement, she gauged just how much to present to the 8-12’s who are Miss Pickerell's audience. A clear picture in bald outline, rather than a mass of confusing and discouraging detail, is most apt to appeal to and instruct that active age group.
