= Moonbase =

Long-term human settlement on the Moon

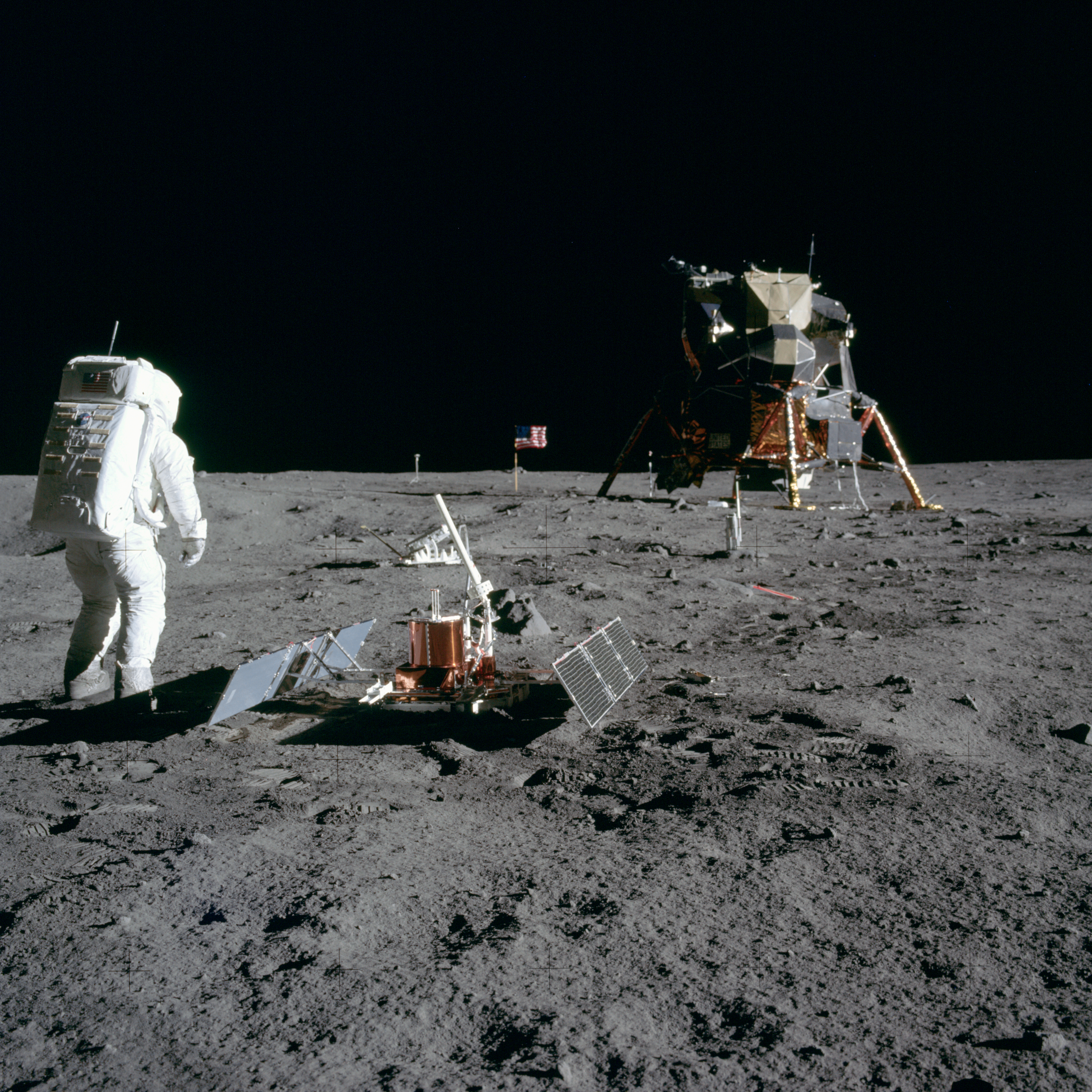
Tranquility Base: (L to R) Astronaut Buzz Aldrin, scientific equipment, Apollo Lunar Module Eagle; US flag and television camera in back (photo by Neil Armstrong)

A moonbase (or lunar base) is a human outpost on or beneath the surface of the Moon. More than a mere site of activity or temporary camp, moonbases are extraterrestrial bases, supporting robotic or human activity, by providing surface infrastructure. Missions to the Moon have realized single-mission bases (Tranquility Base in 1969 being the first), as well as some small permanent infrastructure like lunar laser ranging installations.

Plans for establishing permanent multi-mission moonbases, with surface or sub-surface research stations, are being proposed internationally. As of 2025, the two most advanced projects to establish moonbases have been pursued multilaterally as part of the U.S.-led Artemis program, with its planned Artemis Base Camp and as the China-led International Lunar Research Station. A broad, international infrastructure has been envisioned with the so-called Moon Village concept, and a general international regulatory regime for lunar activity has been called for by the 1979 signed Moon Treaty, and advocated with an implementation agreement since 2020.

The surface infrastructure of a base may consist of pre-integrated basic landers, as supporting stations for robotic rovers, or habitation modules for crewed presence, or of surface assembled or in-situ derived and constructed surface stations for sustained lunar habitation. Lunar bases may work with lunar space stations, which provide supporting infrastructure in lunar orbit.

The development of moonbases into permanent extraterrestrial settlements has been proposed. Broad lunar colonization or space colonization in general, particularly as laying territorial claims, which is prohibited by international space law, has been criticized for perpetuating colonialism.

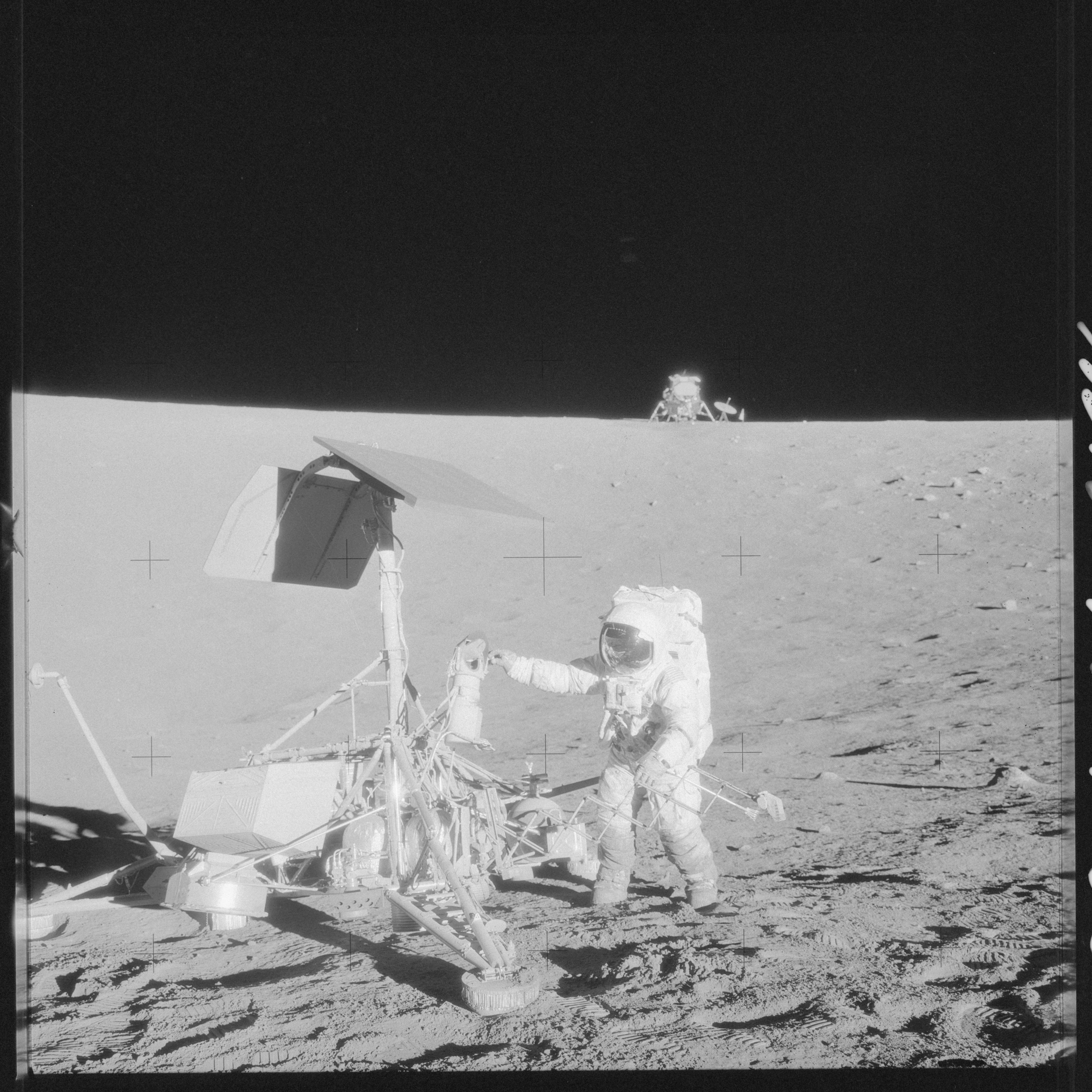
Apollo 12 astronaut Pete Conrad with Surveyor 3 and Apollo 12 Statio Cognitum lunar base with the Intrepid lander and S-band antenna in the background, in a first ever visit of a separate mission beyond Low Earth Orbit

== Past bases ==
The U.S. Apollo Program established the first six temporary bases on the Moon, starting with Tranquility Base (1969).

Later robotic missions set up simple robotic temporary bases, rovers and sample-return missions leaving their landers behind, starting with Luna 16 (1970).

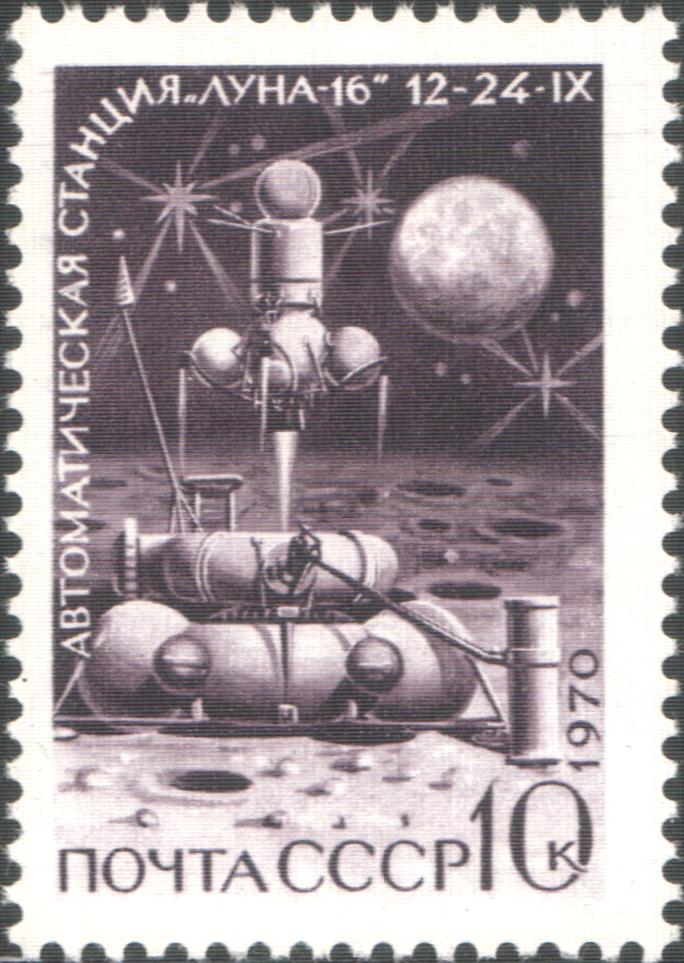
Soviet stamp commemorating Luna 16 (1970), with its return stage separating from its lander.

== Regulation ==
The 1967 Outer Space Treaty defines the Moon and all outer space as the "province of all mankind". It restricts the use of the Moon to peaceful purposes, explicitly banning military installations and weapons of mass destruction. A majority of countries are parties of this treaty.

The 1979 Moon Agreement was created to elaborate on the Outer Space Treaty, restricting the exploitation of the Moon's resources, particularly by any single nation, leaving it to a yet unspecified international regulatory regime. As of January 2020, the Moon Agreement has been signed and ratified by 18 nations, none of which have human spaceflight capabilities.

Current lunar programs are multilateral, with the US-led Artemis program and the China-led International Lunar Research Station. For broad international cooperation and coordination, the International Lunar Exploration Working Group (ILEWG), the Moon Village Association (MVA) and more generally the International Space Exploration Coordination Group (ISECG) have been established.

Since 2020, countries have joined the U.S. in the Artemis Accords, which are challenging the treaty. The U.S. has furthermore emphasized in a presidential executive order ("Encouraging International Support for the Recovery and Use of Space Resources.") that "the United States does not view outer space as a 'global commons'" and calls the Moon Agreement "a failed attempt at constraining free enterprise."

With Australia signing and ratifying both the Moon Treaty in 1986 as well as the Artemis Accords in 2020, there has been a discussion if they can be harmonized. In this light an Implementation Agreement for the Moon Treaty has been advocated for, as a way to compensate for the shortcomings of the Moon Treaty and to harmonize it with other laws and agreements such as the Artemis Accords, allowing it to be more widely accepted.

=== Conservation ===
In the face of such increasing commercial and national interest, particularly prospecting territories, U.S. lawmakers have introduced in late 2020 specific regulation for the conservation of historic landing sites and interest groups have argued for making such sites World Heritage Sites and zones of scientific value protected zones, all of which add to the legal availability and territorialization of the Moon.

== United States concepts ==
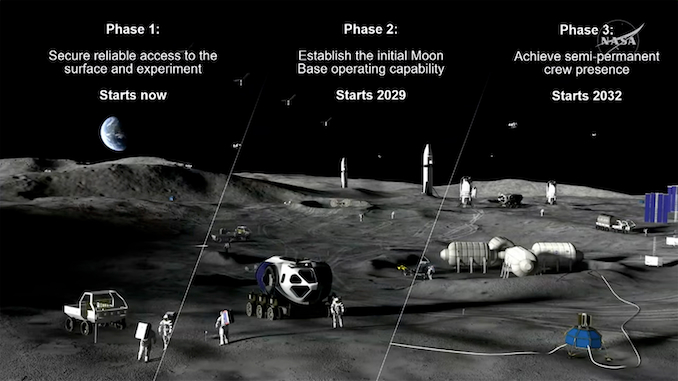
NASA's 2026 presented plan for establishing a permanent lunar base

The United States has run several attempts to design and in some cases develop lunar outposts and the needed missions, the first being from 1959, with the upcoming Artemis missions being the most advanced.

Map of the Artemis Accords present signatory states

=== Current: Artemis Program ===
The US-led Artemis Program has scheduled several crewed landings at the Moon's south polar region, starting with Artemis IV planned for early 2028 at the earliest, setting up five temporary base camps with the Human Landing Systems (HLS) until Artemis VIII is planned to set up the fixed Foundational Surface Habitat (FSH) of the Artemis Base Camp in the 2030s. India was also invited to contribute to the Moonbase project.

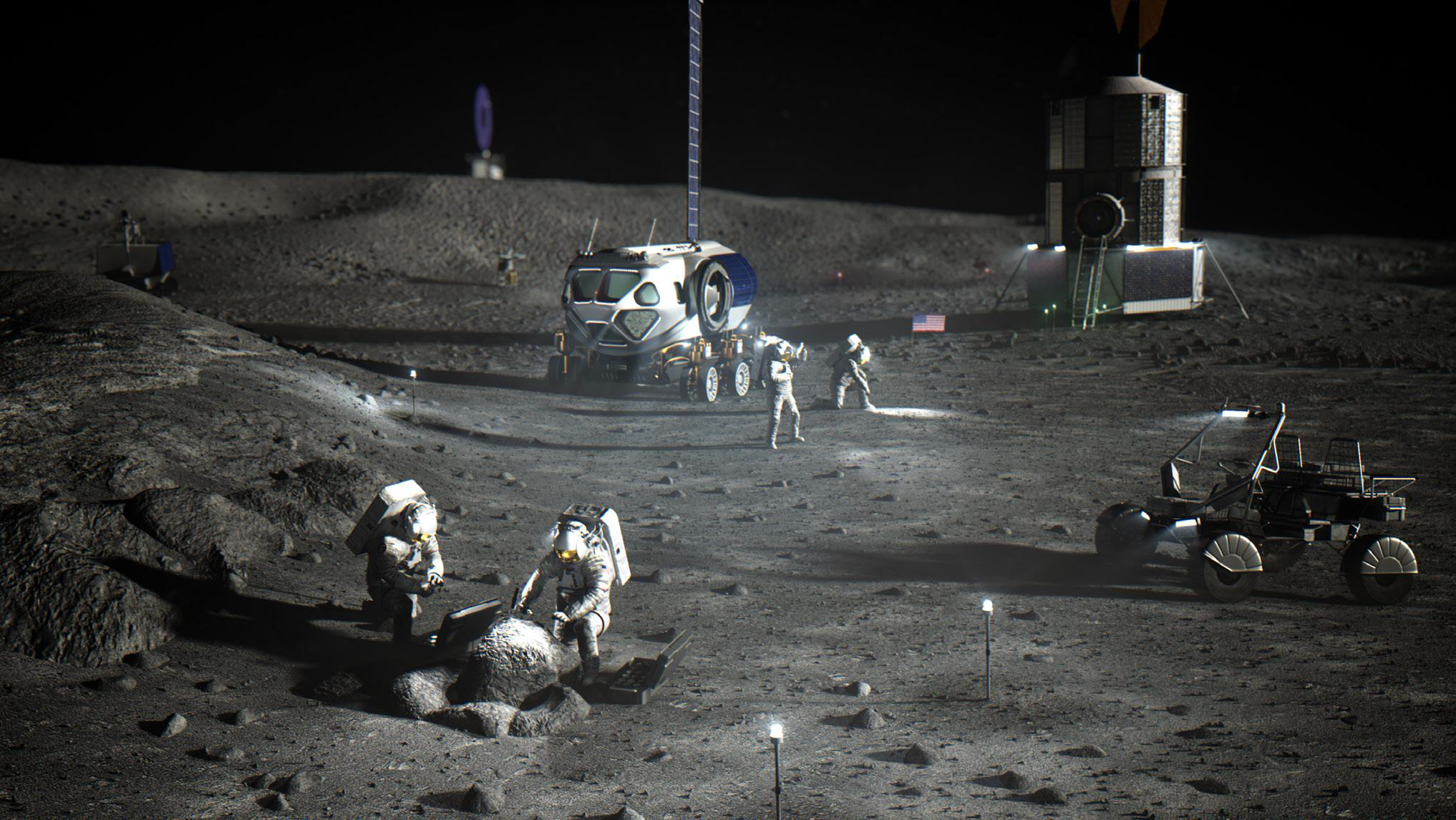
Concept art of Artemis Base Camp at the Lunar south pole with a Foundational Surface Habitat and a Pressurized rover ("Mobile Habitat")

==== Foundational Surface Habitat: Multi-Purpose Habitation module ====
Under a bilateral Moon cooperation agreement between NASA and the Italian Space Agency ( known as ASI) and within the Artemis Accords, Thales Alenia Space is designing a Foundational Surface Habitat, the Multi-Purpose Habitation (MPH) module. The MPH module will host Artemis astronauts and support both surface operations and scientific research experiments. It will operate both with and without the presence of a human crew and will have the ability to move on the surface. In March 2026, ASI president Teodoro Valente indicated, "A long-standing space cooperation, now even deeper, between NASA and ASI will lead to the creation of a base camp on the Moon and an Italian astronaut walking on the lunar surface."

== Moon Village concept ==
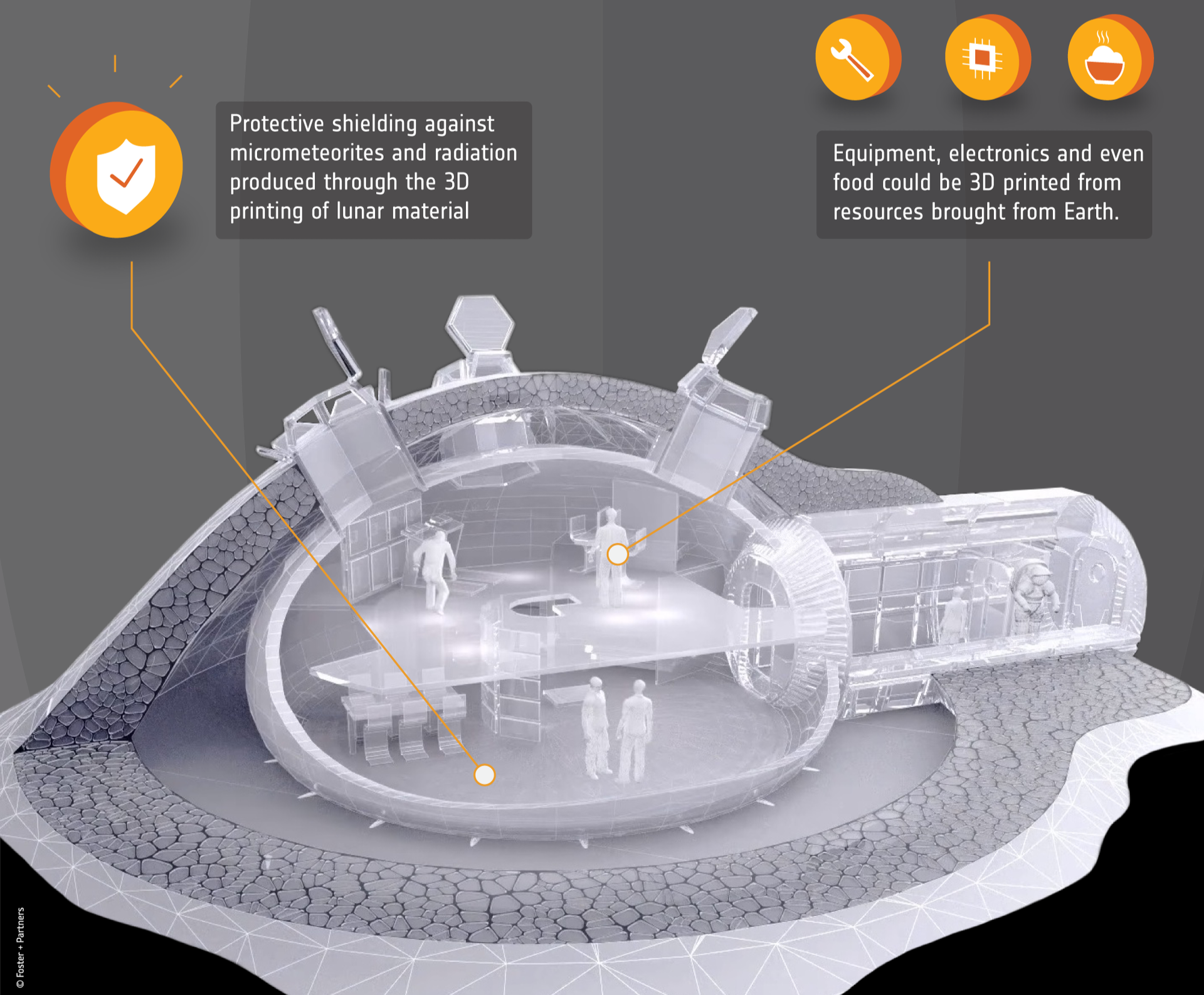
3D-printed lunar habitat (ESA, 2018)

The European Space Agency (ESA) endorsed a Moon Village concept in 2015. The "Village" is an international group of public and private investors, scientists, engineers, universities, and corporate actors coordinating to build and share infrastructure on the Moon and in cislunar space. Moon Village promotes international cooperation and the commercialization of space.

The Moon Village Association is a nonprofit organization established in Vienna, Austria, in November 2017. with the mission to create a global forum to build and maintain a permanent human settlement near the lunar south pole, taking advantage of near-continuous sunlight and nearby deposits of ice and other useful volatiles.

The Moon Village is not one project or one program. It says, "Let's do it together."

— Jan Wörner

According to ESA, the Village's objective is to create a permanent sustainable presence on the surface of the Moon, whether robotic or crewed. In 2017, ESA Director General Jan Wörner, described the Village as "an understanding, not a single facility", and a first step toward Martian exploration. Wörner suggested the Moon Village as a successor to the orbiting International Space Station (ISS).

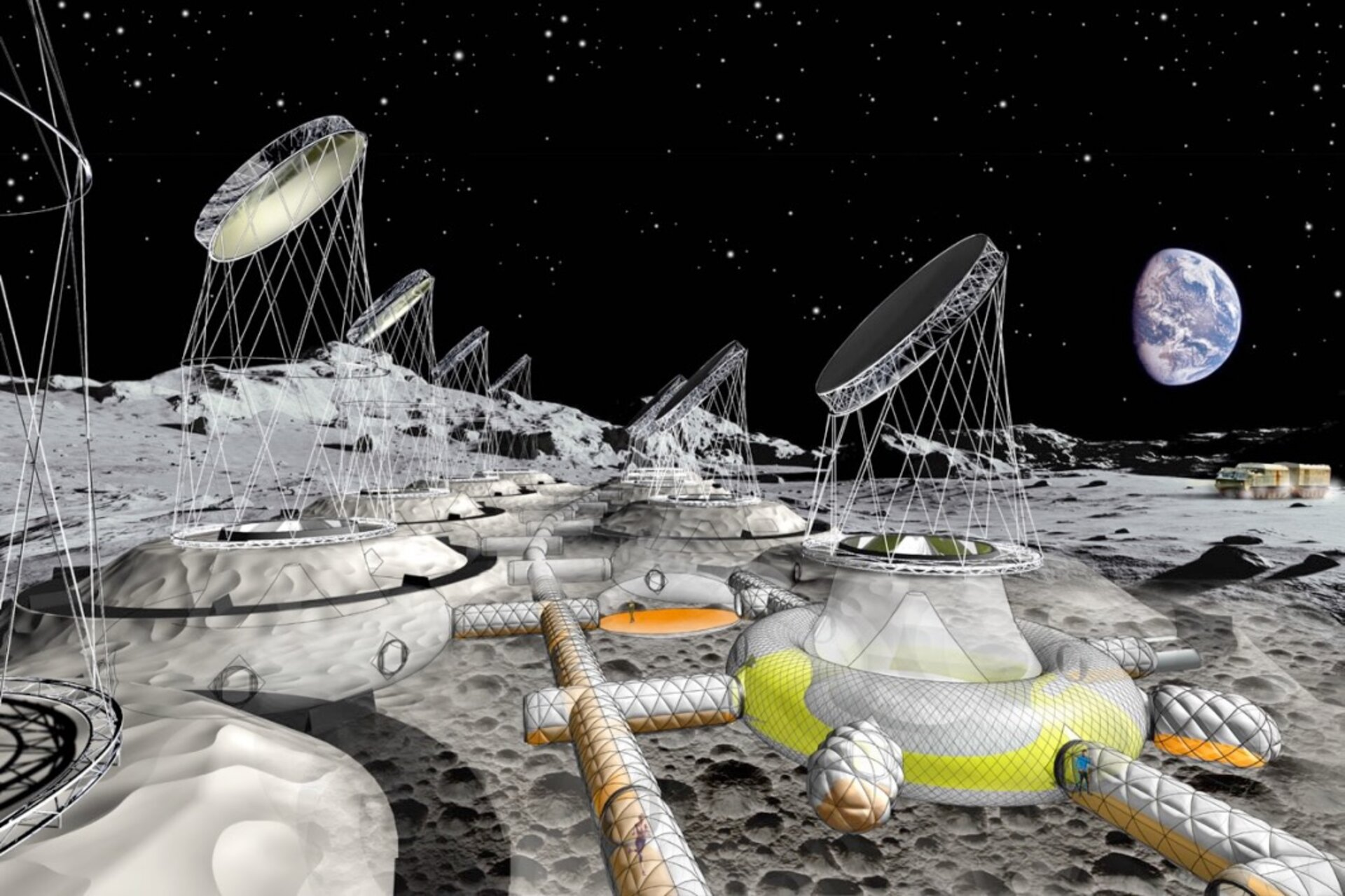
Inflatable lunar base with greenhouses, all radiation shielded through regolith, while sunlight enters through mirrors (ESA, 2022)

China has expressed interest in the Moon Village as has NASA, as the Moon Village relates to NASA's proposed Lunar Gateway space station. The private aerospace company Blue Origin has expressed early interest and offered to develop a cargo lander with a 4,500 kg (9,900 lb) capacity of usable payload.

In 2018, the Vienna University of Technology received sponsorship from ESA for a design workshop on the topic of the Moon Village. 35 master students have developed hypothetical scenarios for a future Moon village. The cooperative concept of the workshop led to a number of new themes, such as multipurpose mobile infrastructure, an astro-scientist training campus on the Moon, an experimental research food lab, and a lunar recycling facility.

== Chinese concept ==
Map of the International Lunar Research Station (ILRS) states

In 2020, China proposed the International Lunar Research Station (ILRS), a somewhat similar proposal to the Moon Village, with the Russian space agency Roscosmos and the ESA showing interest. The first steps toward establishing the ILRS will be taken through Phase IV of the Chinese Lunar Exploration Program, consisting of Chang'e 6, 7, and 8, as well as the Russian missions, Luna 25, 26, and 27. Long-term robotic and short-term crew missions at the ILRS are expected to begin in the early 2030s. Roscosmos signed a memorandum of understanding on cooperation in the creation of the ILRS with CNSA on March 9, 2021. There is a projected timeline stretching from the 2030s to 2045.

The China National Space Administration (CNSA) has commenced the Chang'e program for exploring the Moon to investigate the prospect of lunar mining, specifically for mining isotope helium-3 for use as an energy source on Earth. CNSA director Luan Enjie has stated that humans must learn to leave Earth and "set up a self-sufficient extraterrestrial homeland".

On March 9, 2021, Russia and China signed a memorandum of understanding for the joint construction of the International Lunar Research Station (ILRS) around 2035.

== Soviet Union concepts (defunct) ==
=== Lunny Poligon ===
The Russian Federal Space Agency (Roscosmos) has planned a fully robotic lunar base called Lunny Poligon. The project was planned for 2020, with an expected completion date of 2037. However, on March 9, 2021, Russia turned to cooperate with China and signed a memorandum of understanding for the joint construction of the International Lunar Research Station (ILRS).

=== Zvezda ===
Zvezda moonbase (Russian: звезда, "star") was a Soviet plan and project from 1962 to 1974 to construct a crewed moonbase as successor to the N1-L3 crewed lunar expedition program. The project was ordered by the Soviet space chief Sergei Korolyov to Vladimir Barmin's Spetcmash bureau. The project was named DLB Lunar Base in technical specifications and Zvezda in government documents. Unofficially, the project was called Barmingrad (Barmin's city) by its designers.

The realization of the project depended on key parts of the N1-L3 program – the N-1 superheavy launcher, all 4 launches of which failed between 1969 and 1972. Zvezda moonbase was cancelled with the rest of the Soviet human lunar programs. All crewed Soviet lunar programs, including a Zvezda moonbase, had been classified as top secret and were only published in the glasnost epoch since 1990.

=== Lunar Expeditionary Complex ===
The LEK Lunar Expeditionary Complex was a lunar expedition and Moon base proposed by Valentin Glushko in 1974 as a Soviet response to the United States' Apollo program and as a successor to the Zvezda moonbase, which was based on the cancelled N1-L3 crewed Moon expedition program. If implemented, it was intended to have been operational by 1980 and used for scientific and engineering research.

=== Energia Lunar Expedition ===
The Energia Lunar Expedition was a project that was proposed by Soviet engineer Valentin Glushko in 1988 which would’ve aimed to create a lunar base using the Energia rocket. The lunar base was to then be eventually used for mining helium-3 from the lunar surface.

== Other concepts ==
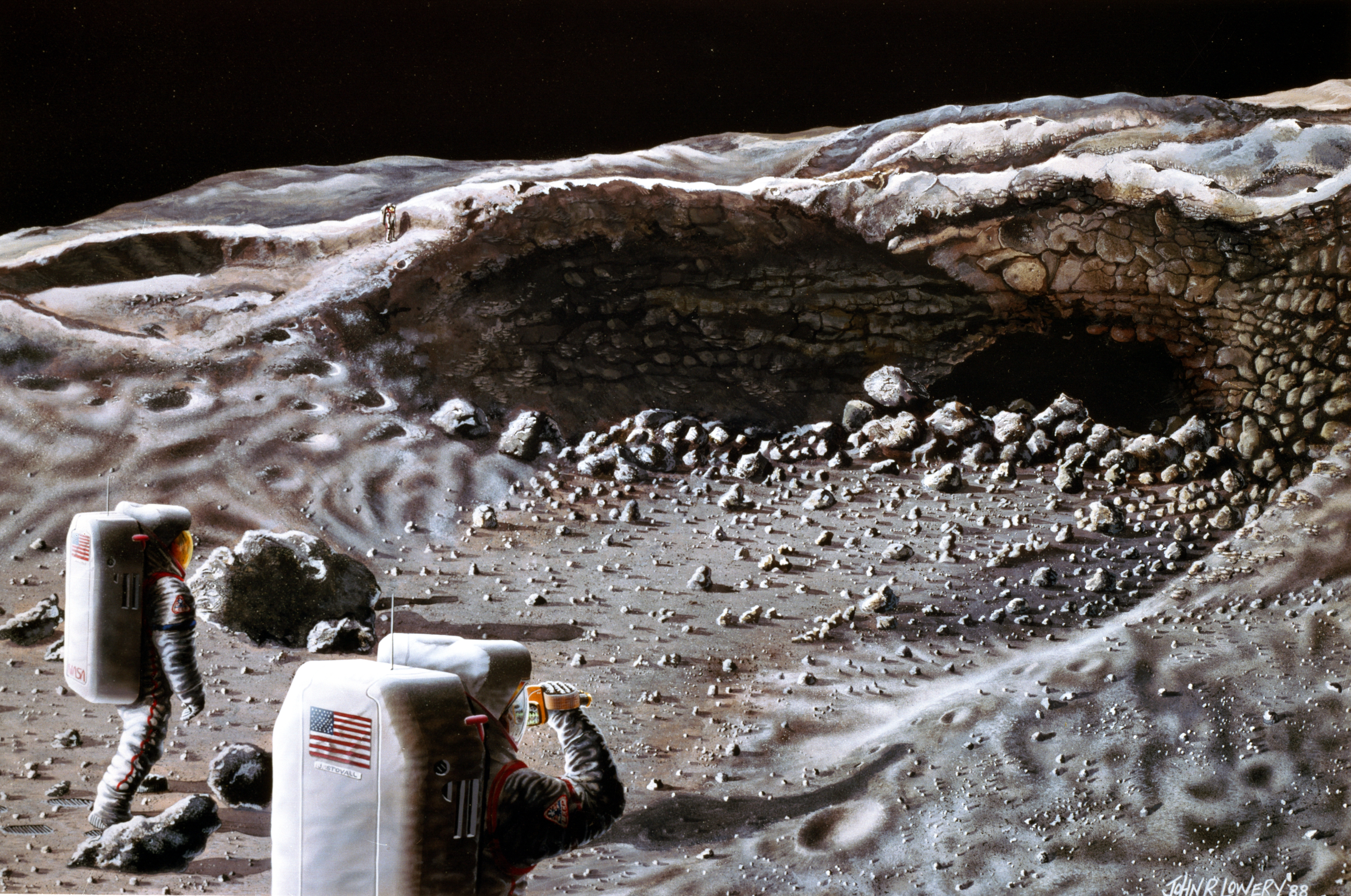
Lunar lava tubes have been envisioned to house humans (NASA concept drawing of astronauts exploring a cave on the Moon, 1988).

In 1954, science fiction writer Arthur C. Clarke proposed a lunar base of inflatable modules covered in lunar dust for insulation. A spaceship assembled in low Earth orbit would launch to the Moon, and astronauts would set up the igloo-like modules and an inflatable radio mast. Subsequent steps would include the establishment of a larger, permanent dome; an algae-based air purifier; a nuclear reactor for the provision of power; and electromagnetic cannons to launch cargo and fuel to interplanetary vessels in space.

In 1959, John S. Rinehart suggested that the safest design would be a structure that could "[float] in a stationary ocean of dust", since there were, at the time this concept was outlined, theories that there could be mile-deep dust oceans on the Moon. The proposed design consisted of a half-cylinder with half-domes at both ends, with a micrometeoroid shield placed above the base.

In 1962, John DeNike and Stanley Zahn published their idea of a sub-surface base located at the Sea of Tranquility. This base would house a crew of 21, in modules placed four meters below the surface, which was believed to provide radiation shielding on par with Earth's atmosphere. DeNike and Zahn favored nuclear reactors for energy production, because they were more efficient than solar panels, and would also overcome the problems with the long lunar nights. For the life support system, an algae-based gas exchanger was proposed.

As of 2006, the Japanese Aerospace Exploration Agency (JAXA) planned a human lunar landing around 2020 that would lead to a crewed lunar base by 2030; however, there was no budget yet for this project.

In 2007, Jim Burke, of the International Space University in France, said people should plan to preserve humanity's culture in the event of a civilization-stopping asteroid impact with Earth. A Lunar Noah's Ark was proposed. Subsequent planning may be taken up by the International Lunar Exploration Working Group (ILEWG).

In 2010, The Moon Capital Competition offered a prize for a design of a lunar habitat intended to be an underground international commercial center capable of supporting a residential staff of 60 people and their families. The Moon Capital is intended to be self-sufficient with respect to food and other material required for life support. Prize money was provided primarily by the Boston Society of Architects, Google Lunar X Prize and The New England Council of the American Institute of Aeronautics and Astronautics.

== Surface infrastructure ==
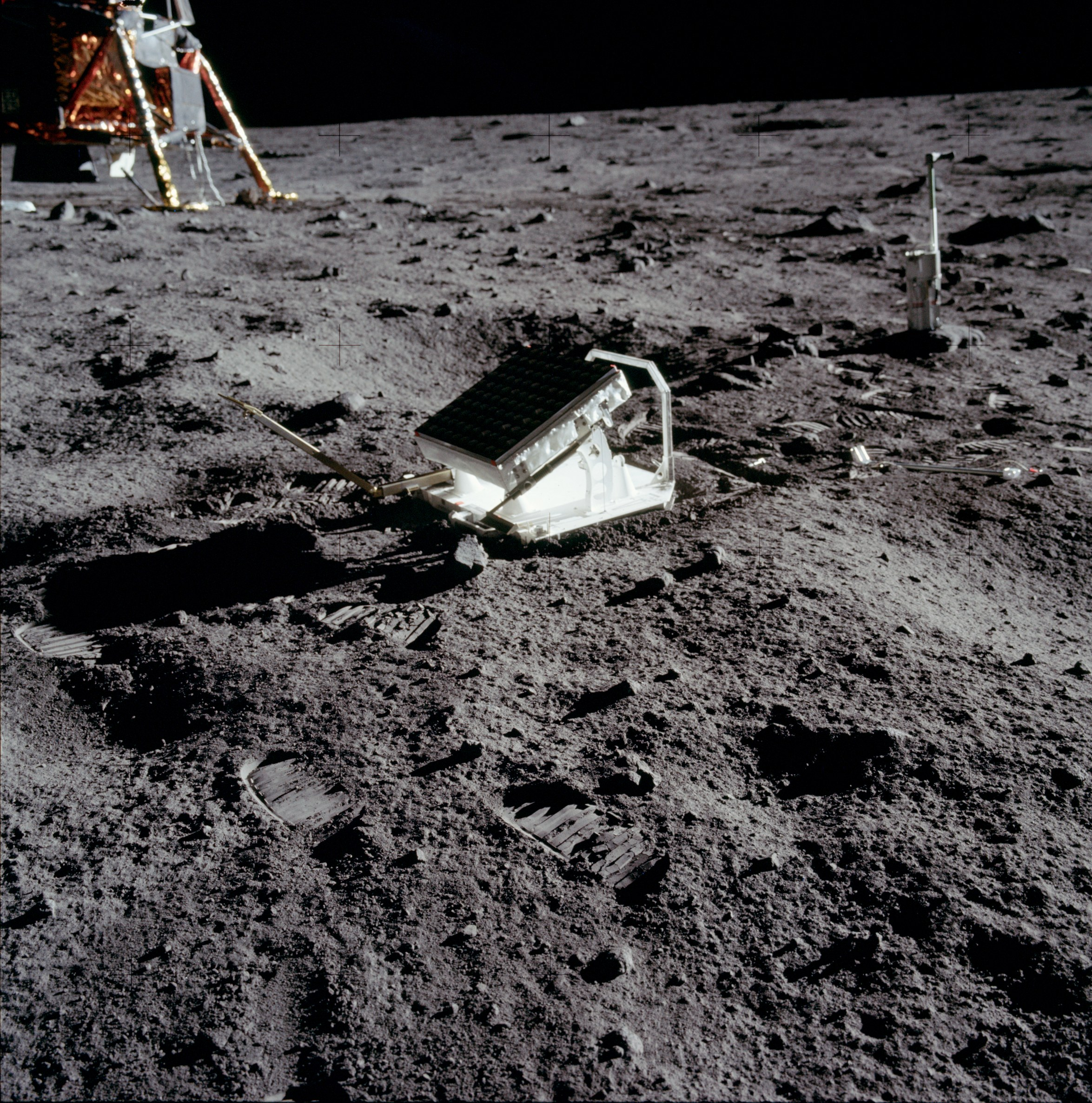
Apollo 11 Lunar Laser Ranging Retroreflector

Besides temporary infrastructure of lunar missions, some of the permanently placed artificial objects on the Moon have already fulfilled long-term purposes. Since 1969, retroreflectors have been installed on the surface of the Moon and are actively used for lunar laser ranging. Equatorial sites have been described as easier for landing and launch and allowing constant communication with Earth, although long lunar nights pose challenges for power.

In the 2010s, the International Lunar Network consisting of robotic instruments placed around the moon was also proposed.

== Orbital infrastructure ==
Lunar orbital spacecraft have been supporting lunar bases since the use of the Apollo command and service module in lunar orbit.

Today an increasing number of lunar satellites provide different services to surface missions and possibly to lunar bases.

The current lunar landing Artemis program was to be supported by the since shelved Lunar Gateway.

== See also ==
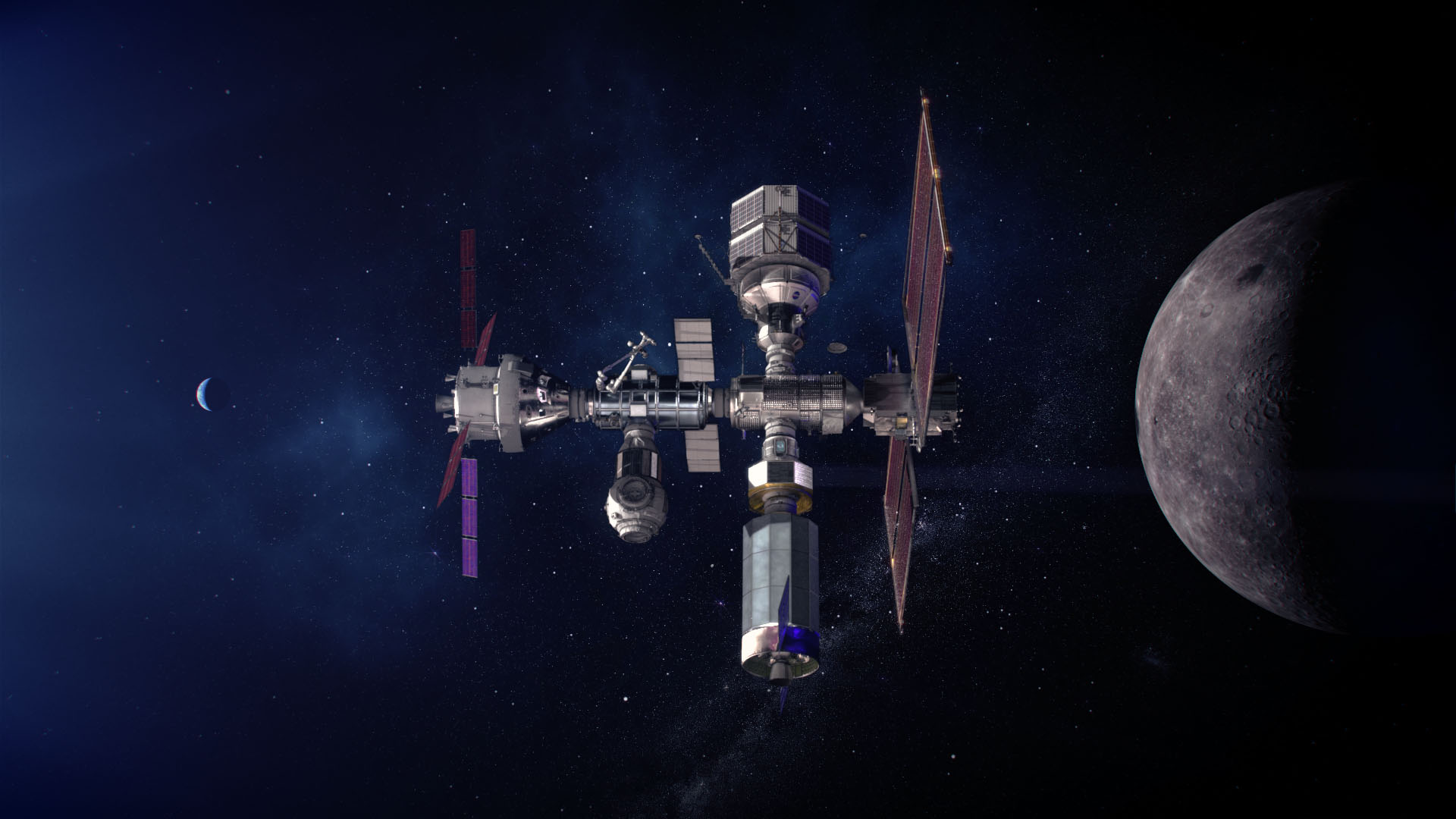
- Concept art of the shelved Lunar Gateway, proposed as a communication hub, science laboratory, short-term habitation for crewed missions and holding area for rovers in Lunar orbit
  Lunar habitation
- Human presence in space
- Human outpost
  - Research station
  - Space station
    - Lunar Gateway
    - Orbital Piloted Assembly and Experiment Complex
  - Space observatory
  - Mars habitat
    - Human mission to Mars
- Lunar lander
  - Lunar module
  - List of crewed lunar landers
- List of artificial objects on the Moon
- Lunar resources
- Moon in fiction
