= List of fictional astronauts (modern period, works released 2010–2029) =

Lists of fictional astronauts
Early period	Project Mercury	Project Gemini
Project Apollo	1975–1989	1990–1999
2000–2009	2010–2029	Moon
Inner Solar System	Outer Solar System	Other
Far future

The following is a list of fictional astronauts from recent times, using the Space Shuttle, the International Space Station and other spaceflight technologies, as depicted in works released between 2010 and 2029.

== 2010–2019 ==
Name(s)	Appeared in	Program / Mission / Spacecraft	Fictional date
(2010–2019)
Astronaut Audrey	The Cat in the Hat Knows a Lot About That! (2010–2019), TV series The Cat in the Hat Knows a Lot About Space! (2017), TV special	Space Station	Contemporary
Astronaut Audrey	Recurring character and friend of The Cat in the Hat.		
Keith Palmer (Founder/CEO); Beau Lendell (Pilot); Dominic Cross (Passenger); Sam Gardner (Passenger)	CSI: Miami; Miami, We Have a Problem (2010), TV	Prime Mover Aerospace: Orbiter	Contemporary
Keith Palmer (Founder/CEO); Beau Lendell (Pilot); Dominic Cross (Passenger); Sam Gardner (Passenger)	Gardner is murdered aboard commercial spacecraft in low Earth orbit and his body dumped from helicopter.		
International Space Station: Krashinsky Space Eagle: Oleg Olesky (Captain); Tyler Kirkpatrick (Co-Pilot); Vladimir Fedorov; Delia Chase (Passenger)	Endgame; Huxley, We Have a Problem (2011), TV	International Space Station Chase Galactic: Space Eagle	Contemporary
International Space Station: Krashinsky Space Eagle: Oleg Olesky (Captain); Tyler Kirkpatrick (Co-Pilot); Vladimir Fedorov; Delia Chase (Passenger)	ISS veteran Olesky, slated to captain first commercial space carrier, is accused of murder. Kirkpatrick is a former NASA astronaut.		
Shenzhou 10: Chaoyang Xie, Lt. Col. Wu Changfeng, Maj. Xue Yimeng, Lt. Shenzhou 11: Zhang Tiancong, Col. Wang Guan San, Lt. Col. Zhou Xiaosu, Lt.	《飞天》 (2011) (English title Flying), Chinese film	Shenzhou program	2008 – 2014
Shenzhou 10: Chaoyang Xie, Lt. Col. Wu Changfeng, Maj. Xue Yimeng, Lt. Shenzhou 11: Zhang Tiancong, Col. Wang Guan San, Lt. Col. Zhou Xiaosu, Lt.	Chinese dramatization of a series of the crewed spaceflights, following the "real" Shenzhou 7, to China's space station. Col. Zhang is a veteran taikonaut, passed over for the earlier crewed missions, while Lieutenants Xue and Zhou are female fighter pilots, competing for the honor of being the first Chinese woman to be launched into space.		
Eric Johnson (USN)	Launch (2011), short film	NASA	Contemporary
Eric Johnson (USN)	Pilot selected for NASA Astronaut Group 21 learns his wife has cancer.		
Lee James Miller, Capt.	Love (2011), film	Space Shuttle; International Space Station	2039 – 2045
Lee James Miller, Capt.	First astronaut in space in almost twenty years is stranded aboard ISS. Miller loses contact with Mission Control on July 7, 2039; he remains on ISS until at least 2045.		
Makarand "Mac" Joshi (India); Five unnamed astronauts	Nothingness (2011), short film	NASA: Ralford 11 (space probe)	November 11, 2011
Makarand "Mac" Joshi (India); Five unnamed astronauts	Astronauts on mission to learn what happens after death.		
Sergei Kushnirov; Three unnamed astronauts/cosmonauts	Phineas and Ferb; Mommy Can You Hear Me? (2011), TV	International Space Station	Contemporary
Sergei Kushnirov; Three unnamed astronauts/cosmonauts	Cosmonaut trying to prove existence of wormholes.		
SCP-1959	SCP-1959 - The Lost Cosmonaut (2011), SCP Foundation, online collaborative-writing	Vostok	1971 – Present
SCP-1959	An unidentified cosmonaut in an unmarked SK-1 spacesuit stuck alternating between Low and High Earth orbit. SCP-1959's invulnerability renders it unimpeded by collisions with other objects and unable to shatter its own visor, and it emits considerable amounts of gamma radiation. Implied to be either Alexei Ledowsky, Andrei Mitkow, or Sergei Shiborin.		
NASA: Jeff Clark, Maj. Colin "Mac" MacAffie Endeavour: Deacon "Deke" Stockard, Cmdr. (USN) (Commander); Kurt Muir, Capt. (Pilot); Janine Harmon, Dr. (Heart surgeon); Two unnamed mission specialists International Space Station: Micah Petrenko (Russia)	Space in His Heart (2011), novel	Space Shuttle; Endeavour International Space Station	November 1999 – January 2000 July 8–21, 2011
NASA: Jeff Clark, Maj. Colin "Mac" MacAffie Endeavour: Deacon "Deke" Stockard, Cmdr. (USN) (Commander); Kurt Muir, Capt. (Pilot); Janine Harmon, Dr. (Heart surgeon); Two unnamed mission specialists International Space Station: Micah Petrenko (Russia)	Stockard is promoted as a sex symbol to enhance NASA's image.		
James Shepard (Navigation); Yuri Hayys (Bioscientist); Jerrie Cobb (Botanist); Thomas Lovell (Commander); Joe Engle (Solar Tech); Alan Brahm (Engineer); Robert Crippen (Engineer)	Vacuity (2011), short film	XOEH: Space station Intrepid (spacecraft)	Near Future
James Shepard (Navigation); Yuri Hayys (Bioscientist); Jerrie Cobb (Botanist); Thomas Lovell (Commander); Joe Engle (Solar Tech); Alan Brahm (Engineer); Robert Crippen (Engineer)	Brahm, trapped in space station airlock, must choose between his own survival and that of his crewmates.		
Four unnamed American astronauts Two unnamed Russian cosmonauts	The Age of Miracles (2012), novel	International Space Station; Orion	Near Future
Four unnamed American astronauts Two unnamed Russian cosmonauts	Astronauts stranded aboard space station when Earth's rotation mysteriously slows.		
Intrepid: Tony Drake (ISA) (Commander); Malory Archer (ISIS); Sterling Malory Archer (ISIS); Cyril Figgis (ISIS); Raymond Q. Gillette (ISIS); Lana Anthony Kane (ISIS); Pamela Poovey (ISIS); Cheryl Tunt (ISIS) Horizon: Kellogg, Capt. (Commander); Dave; Trish; Unnamed astronauts	Archer; Space Race: Part I, Space Race: Part II (2012), TV	International Space Agency (ISA): Space Station Horizon; Space Shuttle Intrepid	Contemporary
Intrepid: Tony Drake (ISA) (Commander); Malory Archer (ISIS); Sterling Malory Archer (ISIS); Cyril Figgis (ISIS); Raymond Q. Gillette (ISIS); Lana Anthony Kane (ISIS); Pamela Poovey (ISIS); Cheryl Tunt (ISIS) Horizon: Kellogg, Capt. (Commander); Dave; Trish; Unnamed astronauts	Agents of International Secret Intelligence Service (ISIS) are hired to take back Horizon from mutineers, but are actually required for a different purpose.		
Nicholas Rice, Cmdr.	The Astro Outlaw (2012), chapter book	NASA	Contemporary
Nicholas Rice, Cmdr.	Moon rock is stolen from astronaut during appearance at Houston Astros game.		
Dimitri Rezinov; Howard Joel "Froot Loops" Wolowitz (Payload Specialist)	The Big Bang Theory; The Countdown Reflection, The Date Night Variable, The Decoupling Fluctuation, The Higgs Boson Observation, The Re-Entry Minimization (2012), TV	Soyuz (possibly Soyuz TMA-04M); International Space Station (Expedition 31)	Summer 2012
Dimitri Rezinov; Howard Joel "Froot Loops" Wolowitz (Payload Specialist)	Astronauts on mission to ISS with Mike Massimino.		
Zach, Cmdr. (no last name given)	Blast Off (2012), short film	International Space Station	20XX [sic]
Zach, Cmdr. (no last name given)	NASA astronaut launches from ISS into thermospheric orbit. Story is probably, but not certainly, a daydream.		
Roger McMillan	The Final Breaths of Astronaut Roger McMillan on the US Glory (2012), web video	U.S. Glory (geosynchronous space station); Orion CM (shown on Glory's computer screens)	Near Future
Roger McMillan	NASA astronaut monitoring orbit of meteor named "Vanessa".		
Chuck Bradshaw, Col. (CDR); Jeremy Wren, Maj. (PLT) Ed Scanlan (CAPCOM)	The Finder; Little Green Men (2012), TV	Space Shuttle	Contemporary
Chuck Bradshaw, Col. (CDR); Jeremy Wren, Maj. (PLT) Ed Scanlan (CAPCOM)	Wren dies in apparent car accident after sighting UFO during Shuttle reentry.		
International Space Station: Bill Eriksson (Mission commander); Keith "Chip" Corcoran, Capt. (Ph.D.) (USAF); Tim Fisher; Petra Gutierrez; Mort Stevens (MS-2) International Space Station: Yoshida; Eichhorn; Jones; Collins (no first names given); Unnamed astronaut	The Infinite Tides (2012), novel	Space Shuttle; International Space Station	Contemporary
International Space Station: Bill Eriksson (Mission commander); Keith "Chip" Corcoran, Capt. (Ph.D.) (USAF); Tim Fisher; Petra Gutierrez; Mort Stevens (MS-2) International Space Station: Yoshida; Eichhorn; Jones; Collins (no first names given); Unnamed astronaut	NASA astronaut Corcoran tries to adjust to suburban life after his daughter dies while he is on ISS.		
Spektr: Vasily Konstantin (FKA); Other unnamed cosmonauts	Juggernaut (2012), novel	Russian Federal Space Agency (FKA): Space Station; Spaceplane Spektr	c. 1990s and 2005
Spektr: Vasily Konstantin (FKA); Other unnamed cosmonauts	Cosmonaut launched on a secret mission to a high-orbit space station covertly constructed at the same time as the Mir space station, returns to Earth years later contaminated with a bio-mechanical parasite.		
Yuri (no last name given) (impersonating Nikolay Anatolyevich "Kolya" Tamantsev (Note: Also spelled "Tamatsev", "Tomantsev" and "Tomatsev" in English subtitles.)); Sergey Sanin (Commander of cosmonaut corps); Grechko; Unnamed cosmonaut trainees	Kosmonavtika (aka Cosmonautics) (2012), film	Rocketspace Corporation; International Space Expedition	c. 2013
Yuri (no last name given) (impersonating Nikolay Anatolyevich "Kolya" Tamantsev); Sergey Sanin (Commander of cosmonaut corps); Grechko; Unnamed cosmonaut trainees	Businessman Yuri assumes identity of alcoholic military pilot to train as a cosmonaut.		
Unnamed commander Unnamed astronauts	Mousetronaut: Based on a (Partially) True Story (2012), picture book	Space Shuttle; Atlantis	Recent Past
Unnamed commander Unnamed astronauts	Mouse named Meteor saves space shuttle mission.		
Fiona MacLeod Starr	Once Upon a Toad (2012), novel	Soyuz; International Space Station	Contemporary
Fiona MacLeod Starr	NASA astronaut's daughter has weird experiences while her mother is in space.		
James Ford	Pantheon (2012), short film	Pantheon (space station) (UK?)	Near Future
James Ford	Astronaut alone on space station at time of catastrophe on Earth.		
Allegra (NASA); Gio (Italy) (no last names given)	Touch; Zone of Exclusion (2012), TV	International Space Station	Contemporary
Allegra (NASA); Gio (Italy) (no last names given)	Italian astronaut loses communications with colleague and Houston during EVA.		
Pete Seabrook, Col. (USMC)	Blue Bloods; No Regrets (2013), TV	Space Shuttle	Contemporary
Pete Seabrook, Col. (USMC)	Retired astronaut who flew on every shuttle except Endeavour is drinking too much after divorce. He is wearing an STS-72 patch on his shirt.		
Gordon McClintock, Cmdr. (NASA); A. Borovsky (Russia); Unnamed astronauts	Defiance; I Just Wasn't Made For These Times (2013), TV	International Space Station Bravery Nine; Soyuz	2013 2046
Gordon McClintock, Cmdr. (NASA); A. Borovsky (Russia); Unnamed astronauts	In 2013, aliens kill space station crew and create double of McClintock with implanted memories. McClintock was a mission specialist on STS-124 in May 2008.		
Unnamed astronaut	Echoes (2013), short film	Unknown	Contemporary
Unnamed astronaut	Spacewalking astronaut catches pink balloon.		
STS-157: Matthew Kowalsky, Lt. (Commander); Ryan Stone, Dr. (Mission Specialist); Shariff Dasari (Mission Specialist); Evans; Thomas	Gravity (2013), film	Space Shuttle; Explorer (STS-157) International Space Station; Soyuz TMA-14M Tiangong; Shenzhou	Near Future
STS-157: Matthew Kowalsky, Lt. (Commander); Ryan Stone, Dr. (Mission Specialist); Shariff Dasari (Mission Specialist); Evans; Thomas	Astronauts stranded in orbit after Kessler syndrome-inspired collision during spacewalk.		
Pysters; Corsi, Col. (no first names given); Keith Clone (Mechanic)	Happy Talk (2013), novel	Skylab	1975
Pysters; Corsi, Col. (no first names given); Keith Clone (Mechanic)	Novel's penultimate epilogue involves NASA mission to repair Skylab's gyroscopes.		
Jerry Martinez	Kickin' It; Seaford, We Have a Problem (2013), TV	Seaford Aeronautics and Space Administration (SASA): Space Shuttle	Contemporary
Jerry Martinez	Teenager Martinez accidentally launches himself into space; returns to Earth by space diving.		
Unnamed commander Unnamed pilot	SKYN Condoms Presents: Naked Astronaut – The Closest Thing To Wearing Nothing (2013), web video	Space Shuttle	Contemporary
Unnamed commander Unnamed pilot	Shuttle astronaut chooses not to wear clothes during lift-off.		
Garrison Sterling	Space in the Heart (2013), novel	Space Shuttle	1999, 2010
Garrison Sterling	STS-107 shuttle mission specialist whose wife is murdered prior to his flight.		
NASA: Andy Hawkins; Roy Manley, Capt. (USN) International Space Station: Yuri Koslov, Cmdr. Michael; Molly (no last names given); 3 unnamed astronauts Soyuz rescue vehicle: Unnamed cosmonaut	Space Warriors (2013), TV movie	International Space Station; Soyuz; Soyuz rescue vehicle	Contemporary
NASA: Andy Hawkins; Roy Manley, Capt. (USN) International Space Station: Yuri Koslov, Cmdr. Michael; Molly (no last names given); 3 unnamed astronauts Soyuz rescue vehicle: Unnamed cosmonaut	United States Space Camp participants, including former astronaut Hawkins' son, compete for ride to space aboard Orion II, but must intervene when crisis strikes ISS.		
Bairn (US); Straus (US) (no first names given)	Superman Unchained #1 (2013), comic book	US/Russia/Japan: The Lighthouse (Space station)	Contemporary/Near Future (June)
Bairn (US); Straus (US) (no first names given)	Crew of secret space station is rescued by Superman.		
Chet Minor, Maj.	George Brown, Class Clown; How Do You Pee in Space? (2014), chapter book	International Space Station	Contemporary
Chet Minor, Maj.	Astronaut interviewed by fourth-grader on school TV station.		
Unnamed janitor Unnamed night watchman Unnamed astronauts	"The Janitor in Space" (2014), short story	Space station	Future
Unnamed janitor Unnamed night watchman Unnamed astronauts	Female ex-convict works as janitor on space station.		
Cash Maddux (Mission Specialist); Herbert Swanschbaum (Note: Named "Swanschbaumer" on p. 137, but "Swanschbaum" on pp. 135-136 and 220.) (Mission Specialist)	Life on Mars (2014), novel	NASA	Contemporary (Summer – April)
Cash Maddux (Mission Specialist); Herbert Swanschbaum (Mission Specialist)	Rival astronauts from the Space Shuttle era. Maddux never flew in space due to high blood pressure.		
Edmund (no last name given)	Once Upon an Alphabet (2014), picture book	Unknown	Contemporary?
Edmund (no last name given)	Astronaut who is afraid of heights.		
Yergey (Maintenance Engineer) (no last name given)	Russian Roulette (2014), short film	Zvybrovnik 188 (sp?) (Deep Space Telescope)	Contemporary/Near Future
Yergey (Maintenance Engineer) (no last name given)	Lone cosmonaut on space telescope encounters London woman on video chat website.		
Commander; Flight Engineer; Two Science Officers; Unnamed doctor (Russian); Unnamed Russian cosmonauts Harrison (Technical Mission Specialist); Wallace (Technical Mission Specialist); Unnamed Technical Mission Specialist	"The Serial Killer's Astronaut Daughter" (2014), short story	Private space station	Future
Commander; Flight Engineer; Two Science Officers; Unnamed doctor (Russian); Unnamed Russian cosmonauts Harrison (Technical Mission Specialist); Wallace (Technical Mission Specialist); Unnamed Technical Mission Specialist	Unnamed Technical Mission Specialist learns her biological father is on Death Row.		
Carol Elizabeth Hall, Ph.D.	"A Short History of the Twentieth Century, or, When You Wish Upon A Star" (2014), novelette	International Space Station	1955 – 2000
Carol Elizabeth Hall, Ph.D.	Hall spends 60 days on ISS, bringing her father's Communist Party membership card with her.		
Unnamed astronaut	Uprooted (2014), short film	Space Shuttle	Unknown
Unnamed astronaut	Female astronaut on one-way journey into space.		
Kev Paciorek (USN)	Your Fathers, Where Are They? And the Prophets, Do They Live Forever? (2014), novel	NASA	Contemporary
Kev Paciorek (USN)	Astronaut kidnapped and questioned by college acquaintance.		
Yuri (no last name given)	Z Nation; Zunami (2014), TV	Soviet Union: (Note: The anachronistic initials "СССР" appear on Yuri's helmet, an indication that he is a hallucination.); International Space Station; Soyuz escape pod	Near Future
Yuri (no last name given)	Mysterious cosmonaut arrives at Citizen Z's outpost, but turns out to be an asphyxia-induced hallucination.		
Cal Bennett, Cmdr. (USN)	"Excalibur" (2015), short story	NASA	Late 2000s
Cal Bennett, Cmdr. (USN)	Retired astronaut discusses secret NASA program with journalist.		
Theo Cooper, Capt. (Commander); Cole Dvorak (Engineer); Bug Kieslowski (Life Systems); Emily McTeer, Dr. (Physician)	400 Days (2015), film	Kepler Industries: 400 Days	Contemporary/Near Future
Theo Cooper, Capt. (Commander); Cole Dvorak (Engineer); Bug Kieslowski (Life Systems); Emily McTeer, Dr. (Physician)	Astronaut hopefuls on simulated 400-day mission.		
International Space Station: Vitaly Simakov; Gennady (no last name given); Rick Farmer, Col. (Ph.D.) (USAF) Tiangong-3: Huan Zhou, Lt. Col./Col. (Commander); Chang Lu, Maj. (Chinese Air Force); Sheng Hu; Two unnamed taikonauts Tallyho: Sir Aeric K. Cavendish (call sign Zorro) (Captain); Aaron Best (Commando); Hook (Commando); Hugger (Commando); Tick (Commando)	Ghost Fleet: A Novel of the Next World War (2015), novel	International Space Station Tiangong-3 Tallyho (formerly named Virgin Galactic 3) (single-stage-to-orbit spaceplane)	Near Future (c. 2020s)
International Space Station: Vitaly Simakov; Gennady (no last name given); Rick Farmer, Col. (Ph.D.) (USAF) Tiangong-3: Huan Zhou, Lt. Col./Col. (Commander); Chang Lu, Maj. (Chinese Air Force); Sheng Hu; Two unnamed taikonauts Tallyho: Sir Aeric K. Cavendish (call sign Zorro) (Captain); Aaron Best (Commando); Hook (Commando); Hugger (Commando); Tick (Commando)	Space station crews are in orbit at outbreak of World War III between China, Russia and United States. Tallyho crew captures Tiangong-3 on privateer mission.		
Clarence "Biff" Barnes, Capt./Maj. (USAF) (Mission Commander); Ray McConnell (Flight Engineer/Second-in-command); Jim Scarelli (Pilot); Steve Skeldon, Capt. (USMC) (Navigator/Co-pilot); Andre Baker, Capt. (USAF) (Weapons Officer); Sue Tillman, Lt. (USN) (Sensor Officer)	Lash-Up (2015), novel	U.S. Space Force: USS Defender (modified VentureStar) (single-stage-to-orbit spaceplane)	September 16, 2017 – March 15, 2018
Clarence "Biff" Barnes, Capt./Maj. (USAF) (Mission Commander); Ray McConnell (Flight Engineer/Second-in-command); Jim Scarelli (Pilot); Steve Skeldon, Capt. (USMC) (Navigator/Co-pilot); Andre Baker, Capt. (USAF) (Weapons Officer); Sue Tillman, Lt. (USN) (Sensor Officer)	Expansion of 2001 novella (q.v.). Defender launches on December 15, 2017.		
Miller	The Last Man on Earth; Screw the Moon (2015), TV	International Space Station	Contemporary
Miller	Phil Miller's brother, a NASA astronaut, is stranded on space station.		
Tom Major; Matt Mason; Stylo, Lt. Col. Caissier, Maj. Independence: Gilbert Grayson Shepard, Col. Finley Alan "Fin" Shepard; April Dawn Wexler Shepard	Sharknado 3: Oh Hell No! (2015), TV movie Sharknado: The 4th Awakens (2016), TV movie	NASA: Space Shuttle; Independence Astro-X	Contemporary Near Future
Tom Major; Matt Mason; Stylo, Lt. Col. Caissier, Maj. Independence: Gilbert Grayson Shepard, Col. Finley Alan "Fin" Shepard; April Dawn Wexler Shepard	Col. Shepard, a former astronaut who never flew in space, takes secret military shuttle into orbit with his son and daughter-in-law to destroy sharknados. He is later rescued from the Moon by unnamed Astro-X astronauts.		
Miller (Ph.D.) International Space Station: Unnamed commander Meg (Ph.D.); Unnamed Russian cosmonauts	"Space" (2015), short story	International Space Station	Contemporary
Miller (Ph.D.) International Space Station: Unnamed commander Meg (Ph.D.); Unnamed Russian cosmonauts	"Manager astronaut" Miller cheats on Meg, his wife, while she is in space.		
Abacha Tunde, Maj. (Nigerian Air Force)	"Afrofuturist 419" (2016), short story	Salyut 6 Soyuz T-16Z/Salyut 8T Spaceflight Services Inc.: Space station	Contemporary
Abacha Tunde, Maj. (Nigerian Air Force)	Tunde, the first African in space, flew to Soviet space station in 1980 and flew on subsequent secret Soviet flights. Stranded aboard private company's space station, he becomes subject of 419 scam.		
Mikhail "Misha" Yurgevich (Retired cosmonaut) NASA: Philippa "Phil" (Note: Also known as "Iron Gut".) Carson, Ph.D. Unnamed ASCANs	All Fixed Up (2016), novel	International Space Station	Contemporary (December)
Mikhail "Misha" Yurgevich (Retired cosmonaut) NASA: Philippa "Phil" Carson, Ph.D. Unnamed ASCANs	Carson is slated for mission to conceive a child in space.		
Unnamed astronaut	The Astronaut Dreamer (2016), short film	United States	Contemporary?
Unnamed astronaut	Astronaut dreams of life on Earth.		
Nate (Canada)	An Astronaut's Tale (2016), short film	NASA	Near Future
Nate (Canada)	Astronaut prepares for spaceflight with the support of Aster, his partner.		
Unnamed astronaut	Before Mars (2016), short film	International Space Station	2016 (August – September) (Note: A newspaper headline refers to the Falcon 9 explosion which occurred on September 1, 2016.)
Unnamed astronaut	Female astronaut speaks by ham radio to future astronaut Hana Seung. Prequel to Mars (2016–2018) (q.v.).		
Space Shuttle: Jenny; Chen; Kim (no last names given) Space station: Two unnamed astronauts	Busy People: Astronaut (2016), picture book	Space Shuttle; Space station	Contemporary
Space Shuttle: Jenny; Chen; Kim (no last names given) Space station: Two unnamed astronauts	Typical space-station mission.		
Infinity: Ruth Christmas, Dr. (US) (Chief of biomedical problems); Cosmonaut X Jane; Uree; Three unnamed crewmembers Self-sufficient mission: Ruth Christmas, Dr. Two unnamed astronauts	Cosmic Hotel (2016), novel	Infinity (space station); Emergency pod Self-sufficient mission	Near Future
Infinity: Ruth Christmas, Dr. (US) (Chief of biomedical problems); Cosmonaut X Jane; Uree; Three unnamed crewmembers Self-sufficient mission: Ruth Christmas, Dr. Two unnamed astronauts	Pregnant astronaut Christmas makes emergency reentry after space station crew begins experiencing panic attacks. Christmas later joins private mission of indefinite duration aboard "self-sufficient craft".		
Five unnamed astronauts	Goodnight Spaceman (2016), picture book	International Space Station	Contemporary
Five unnamed astronauts	While their father is on the space station, two children dream about joining him in space.		
Garry (Note: Spelled both "Gary" and "Garry" in end credits.) Freeman; Mike (no last name given)	Lone Wolves (2016), film	Space Shuttle; Polaris Space station	Near Future ("date 19")
Garry Freeman; Mike (no last name given)	Freeman and soldier James Conroy are stranded in parallel dimension.		
James (US) (Station Commander) (no last name given); Unnamed American astronaut Unnamed Japanese astronaut Lev Krupin (Russia); Two unnamed Russian cosmonauts	Madam Secretary; Unity Node (2016), TV	International Space Station; Soyuz	Contemporary (December)
James (US) (Station Commander) (no last name given); Unnamed American astronaut Unnamed Japanese astronaut Lev Krupin (Russia); Two unnamed Russian cosmonauts	ISS is damaged by exploding North Korean satellite, trapping three astronauts in Kibo module.		
Svetlana Petrova, Capt. Ekaterina Solovyeva, Capt.	Matryoshka (2016), short film	Soyuz; Soyuz-Matryoshka	1983
Svetlana Petrova, Capt. Ekaterina Solovyeva, Capt.	In 1983, the Soviet Union launches a routine Soyuz mission, crewed by two female cosmonauts. Once in orbit, the mission runs into serious problems which leave the crew facing a series of life or death decisions and the possibility that they may not be able to return to Earth.		
Wilson (no first name given) (US); Unnamed astronauts (US)	Milo Murphy's Law; The Note (2016), TV	Space station	Contemporary (May)
Wilson (no first name given) (US); Unnamed astronauts (US)	Wilson has flashback of EVA emergency while riding in ticker-tape parade.		
Walter O'Brien (Scorpion)	Scorpion; It Isn't the Fall That Kills You (2016), TV	Richard Elia Aerospace Division: Vessel XA42p	Contemporary
Walter O'Brien (Scorpion)	Computer genius is accidentally launched into space due to lightning strike.		
Test flights Crew #1: Joseph Kess, Ph.D. (Pilot); Yuri Pelsin, Dr. (Russia) (Pilot) Crew #2: Turner Walker (USAF) (Pilot); Max Biggs (USAF) (Pilot) Trainees: James (United States Navy SEAL); Wallace (United States Navy SEAL); Jonah Melo (United States Navy SEAL); Nyambi (mononym) (unnamed African country); Six unnamed candidates Orbital flight: Bennett Oscar "Boss" Sheraton, Capt. (United States Navy SEAL) (Pilot)	The Soul of a SEAL (2016), novel	Warren Shuttle (spaceplane)	Contemporary
Test flights Crew #1: Joseph Kess, Ph.D. (Pilot); Yuri Pelsin, Dr. (Russia) (Pilot) Crew #2: Turner Walker (USAF) (Pilot); Max Biggs (USAF) (Pilot) Trainees: James (United States Navy SEAL); Wallace (United States Navy SEAL); Jonah Melo (United States Navy SEAL); Nyambi (mononym) (unnamed African country); Six unnamed candidates Orbital flight: Bennett Oscar "Boss" Sheraton, Capt. (United States Navy SEAL) (Pilot)	Sheraton pilots secret shuttle to deploy communications satellite and laser array.		
Four unnamed astronauts	Take My Heart Away (2016), music video	South African Aerospace Corporation: Space Shuttle	Contemporary/Near Future
Four unnamed astronauts	Child plans to stow away on first African space shuttle.		
Benjamin Stokes (Commander); Unnamed astronauts	"Atlantic Deeps" (2017), short story	NASA: USS Frontier	Near Future
Benjamin Stokes (Commander); Unnamed astronauts	Astronauts crewing the replacement for the Space Shuttle. Killed when the vehicle explodes during launch.		
Buzz Caldwell	Charlie Numbers and the Man in the Moon (2017), novel	Space Shuttle	c. 2017 (late January)
Buzz Caldwell	Original Space Shuttle astronaut who flew in space six times runs aerospace company that sponsors paper airplane contest.		
Unnamed astronaut	Descending (2017), short film	Space Shuttle	Contemporary/Near Future
Unnamed astronaut	Astronaut adrift in space after escaping exploding Space Shuttle.		
Byakuya Ishigami, Prof. (JAXA); Shamil Volkov (Russia) (Soyuz Captain); Connie Lee (US/NASA); Yakov Nikitin, Dr. (Russia); Darya Nikitina, Dr. (Russia); Lillian Weinberg (US) (Spaceflight participant)	Dr. Stone (2017), manga	International Space Station; Two Soyuz spacecraft	Contemporary/Near Future
Byakuya Ishigami, Prof. (JAXA); Shamil Volkov (Russia) (Soyuz Captain); Connie Lee (US/NASA); Yakov Nikitin, Dr. (Russia); Darya Nikitina, Dr. (Russia); Lillian Weinberg (US) (Spaceflight participant)	Astronauts aboard ISS when all humans on Earth are turned to stone.		
Ellie (US) (no last name given)	Ellie the Astronaut (2017), short film	International Space Station	Contemporary
Ellie (US) (no last name given)	Astronaut aboard ISS reminisces about her childhood adventures.		
Kim Gonzalez (Mission Specialist); Max; Karen (no last names given for last two)	Escape Velocity (2017), short film	United States: Low Earth Orbit (LEO)	Contemporary
Kim Gonzalez (Mission Specialist); Max; Karen (no last names given for last two)	Karen chokes out fellow astronaut Max to let her escape training exercise. Film originated as a scene in a longer film, Space Bitch, which was only screened once in 2016.		
James (no last name given)	Followed Back (2017), short film	International Space Station	Contemporary
James (no last name given)	NASA astronaut suffering from apparent PTSD.		
Joseph Neumann	Inhumanwich! (2017), film	United States; National Space Command Center: Argo 1	Near Future
Joseph Neumann	Astronaut on Earth-orbital mission is transformed by radiation accident into carnivorous Sloppy Joe sandwich.		
Hayley Collins (UK) ISS: Dan Drake (RAF/ESA) (Commander); Unnamed astronauts	The Jamie Drake Equation (2017), novel	International Space Station; Soyuz; Lux Aeterna (orbital launch platform)	c. 2017 (October 31 – November 3) (Note: November 3 is a Friday (p. 8), as it was in 2017. World War II ended about 70 years earlier (p. 38).)
Hayley Collins (UK) ISS: Dan Drake (RAF/ESA) (Commander); Unnamed astronauts	Commander Drake spacewalks from ISS to Lux Aeterna platform in higher orbit to launch Light Swarm nano-spacecraft to Tau Ceti. Collins was the first British astronaut to walk in space.		
Ekaterina "Kat" Golovkina (Russia) (Mission Commander); Rory Adams (US) (Flight Engineer); Hugh Derry, Dr. (UK) (Exobiologist); David A. Jordan, Dr. (US) (Crew Medical Officer); Sho Murakami (Japan) (Systems Engineer); Miranda North, Dr. (UK) (Centers for Disease Control and Prevention) (Quarantine Officer)	Life (2017), film	International Space Station (Mars Pilgrim 7 Mission); Soyuz; Lifeboat A Lifeboat B	c. 2030
Ekaterina "Kat" Golovkina (Russia) (Mission Commander); Rory Adams (US) (Flight Engineer); Hugh Derry, Dr. (UK) (Exobiologist); David A. Jordan, Dr. (US) (Crew Medical Officer); Sho Murakami (Japan) (Systems Engineer); Miranda North, Dr. (UK) (Centers for Disease Control and Prevention) (Quarantine Officer)	ISS astronauts analyze life-form brought back by Mars sample return mission.		
Samuel Johnson (Commander); Candice (Medic Officer); Darren; Jerry; Shona	The Pull (2017), The Pull Expanse (2017), short films	Space Shuttle; Voyager 707 International Space Station Soyuz	Contemporary
Samuel Johnson (Commander); Candice (Medic Officer); Darren; Jerry; Shona	Astronaut Candice vanishes, then reappears, during spacewalk outside ISS. The same crew later returns to orbit when constellation Cassiopeia and nebula begin moving towards Earth.		
Yuri Cvetko (NASA) (Commander); Laura Ann Hill (NASA) (Mission Specialist); Rodrigo Vargas (USAF/NASA) (Flight Engineer)	Rosewood; Radiation & Rough Landings (2017), TV	International Space Station	Contemporary
Yuri Cvetko (NASA) (Commander); Laura Ann Hill (NASA) (Mission Specialist); Rodrigo Vargas (USAF/NASA) (Flight Engineer)	ISS repair specialist Hill, a three-time space mission veteran, is found dead in an orange tree.		
Valery Shubin (based on Valery Ryumin); Igor Zaytsev Salyut 7: Vladimir Fyodorov (based on Vladimir Dzhanibekov); Svetlana Lazareva (based on Svetlana Savitskaya); Ivanov (no first name given) Salyut 7/Soyuz T-13: Vladimir Fyodorov (Commander); Viktor Alyokhin (Flight Engineer) (based on Viktor Savinykh) Challenger: Patrick de Bonnet (based on Jean-Loup Chrétien)	Salyut 7 (2017), film	Salyut 7 Soyuz T-13 Space Shuttle; Challenger	1985
Valery Shubin (based on Valery Ryumin); Igor Zaytsev Salyut 7: Vladimir Fyodorov (based on Vladimir Dzhanibekov); Svetlana Lazareva (based on Svetlana Savitskaya); Ivanov (no first name given) Salyut 7/Soyuz T-13: Vladimir Fyodorov (Commander); Viktor Alyokhin (Flight Engineer) (based on Viktor Savinykh) Challenger: Patrick de Bonnet (based on Jean-Loup Chrétien)	Russian docudrama film, based on real events but featuring fictional and fictionalized cosmonauts.		
Thomas Lester Musselbaum; Six unnamed astronauts	Superstar (2017), novel	Space Shuttle?	Contemporary
Thomas Lester Musselbaum; Six unnamed astronauts	Five years after Musselbaum died when spacecraft disintegrated on reentry, his son, who is on the autism spectrum, attends school for the first time.		
Sandy (no last name given)	Ada Lace, Take Me to Your Leader (2018), chapter book	International Space Station	Contemporary
Sandy (no last name given)	Astronaut talks to children in San Francisco by ham radio.		
Kerry Atkins, Dr. Unnamed astronauts	Rampage (2018), film	Energyne Industries: Athena-1 (space station); Escape capsule	Contemporary/Near Future
Kerry Atkins, Dr. Unnamed astronauts	Space station crew conducting secret genetic experiments.		
Hall (no first name given); Johnathan Vance; White (no first name given); David Lovelace; Gena Presscot, Dr.	Rumor from Ground Control (2018), film	Space Shuttle; Atlantis (STS-27A)	1989 / Contemporary (September – October, April)
Hall (no first name given); Johnathan Vance; White (no first name given); David Lovelace; Gena Presscot, Dr.	Crew of classified shuttle mission never launched; were instead subjected to radiation experiments simulating solar flare effects.		
Andre "Duracell" Williams (US) (Commander); Mariana Ivanova (Russia); Carla Mendes (US); Hiro Yamamura (Japan)	The Watchers (2018), Can She See Us, Daddy? (2018), short films	International Space Station	Near Future
Andre "Duracell" Williams (US) (Commander); Mariana Ivanova (Russia); Carla Mendes (US); Hiro Yamamura (Japan)	Astronauts on ISS when Earth is struck by extinction-level asteroid.		
SCP-1233	SCP-1233 - The Lunatic (2018), SCP Foundation, online collaborative-writing	Unknown	February 6, 1986 – Present
SCP-1233	An Extravehicular Mobility Unit capable of entering space unassisted by a vehicle, which makes brief and infrequent visits to Earth, with sightings occurring only once per 4-5 years. SCP-1233 identifies itself as "Moon Champion, champion of the Moon, defender of space justice, and destroyer of evil", and is erratic, unpredictable, and occasionally destructive in its proclaimed heroism.		
Mama; Two unnamed astronauts	Astro Girl (2019), picture book	Unknown	Contemporary
Mama; Two unnamed astronauts	Astronaut's daughter wants to be an astronaut herself when she grows up.		
Six unnamed astronauts	Dark Phoenix (a.k.a. X-Men: Dark Phoenix) (2019), film	Space Shuttle; Endeavour	1992
Six unnamed astronauts	Seven of the X-Men — Beast, Cyclops, Jean Grey, Mystique, Nightcrawler, Quicksilver and Storm — fly the X-Jet to rescue the crew of a disabled space shuttle prior to its destruction. Adaptation of the X-Men comics "Dark Phoenix Saga" story arc.		
Apollo 10: Edward Baldwin; Gordo Stevens; Fred Talmadge Unspecified LK mission: Anastasia Belikova Apollo 15: Edward Baldwin; Molly Cobb; Frank Sedgewick Apollo 22: Edward Baldwin; Gordo Stevens; Danielle Poole Apollo 24: Ellen Wilson (née Waverly); Harrison Liu Apollo 25: Molly Cobb; Tracy Stevens; Dennis Lambert Zvezda Base: Mikhail Vasiliev	For All Mankind Season 1 (2019), TV	United States: Apollo 10; Charlie Brown (CSM)/Snoopy (LM) Apollo 15; Endeavour (CSM)/Seahawk (LM) Jamestown Base LSAM (reusable lunar lander) Apollo 22; Excalibur (CSM) Apollo 24; Osprey (CSM) Apollo 25; Unnamed CSM Soviet Union: LK (lunar lander); Zvezda (moonbase)	1969 – 1974 (Alternate History)
Apollo 10: Edward Baldwin; Gordo Stevens; Fred Talmadge Unspecified LK mission: Anastasia Belikova Apollo 15: Edward Baldwin; Molly Cobb; Frank Sedgewick Apollo 22: Edward Baldwin; Gordo Stevens; Danielle Poole Apollo 24: Ellen Wilson (née Waverly); Harrison Liu Apollo 25: Molly Cobb; Tracy Stevens; Dennis Lambert Zvezda Base: Mikhail Vasiliev	In this alternate history timeline, the Soviet Union performs the first crewed landing on the Moon in June 1969 with Alexei Leonov, followed by the first woman on the Moon, pressuring NASA to do the same. Apollo 15 lands near Shackleton Crater, where ice deposits are discovered. A few years later, Jamestown Base and Zvezda Base are built and landed near the same crater. Apollo 22 is the second expedition to Jamestown. Apollo 24 (including Deke Slayton) is a crew rotation mission to Jamestown that has a S-IVB ignition failure. Apollo 25 is sent to repair the flight control computer of that stage.		
Nova Celeste	Miss Bunsen's School for Brilliant Girls; Light as a Feather (2019), novel	Star Village Space Center: Shuttle	Contemporary (June)
Nova Celeste	Celeste, the chief commander of Star Village Space Center, sponsors flying machine contest for science school students. Celeste is a veteran of 17 spaceflights, including 12 orbital flights, and is a former record-holder as the youngest person in space.		
Neil Strongarm	My FANGtastically Evil Vampire Pet; Space Cat-astrophe (2019), novel	Transport shuttle Space ark Secret Space Station Homebase (SSSH)	Contemporary?
Neil Strongarm	Evil astronaut, who was allegedly NASA's original choice to be first man on Moon, plots to kidnap students and counselors at Evil Scientist Summer Camp.		
Two unnamed astronauts	A Space Apart (2019), short film	United Kingdom	Future
Two unnamed astronauts	Male and female British astronauts fall in love from their respective spacecraft in Earth orbit.		
Randolph Witherspoon	The Space Walk (2019), picture book	Unknown	Unknown (Future?)
Randolph Witherspoon	Astronaut who fails to hear Ground Control's order not to talk to strangers during EVA, leading to his befriending an alien.		

== 2020–2029 ==
Name(s)	Appeared in	Program / Mission / Spacecraft	Fictional date
(2020–2029)
Unnamed astronaut	Breathe (2020), short film	Unknown (single-person spacecraft)	Contemporary/Near Future?
Unnamed astronaut	Astronaut has a surreal encounter in Earth orbit.		
Adam Lang (ESA)	Doctor Who; Praxeus (2020), TV	Soyuz	c. 2020
Adam Lang (ESA)	British astronaut returning from ISS crashes in Indian Ocean.		
United States Space Force: Drake Jordon X-37C: Curt Branson, Maj. (USSF) Russian Space Agency: Toporov, Maj. Osinov, Maj.	Whiskey Kilo One Is Down (2020), novel	X-37C (call sign Whiskey Kilo One)	2022
United States Space Force: Drake Jordon X-37C: Curt Branson, Maj. (USSF) Russian Space Agency: Toporov, Maj. Osinov, Maj.	Branson makes an emergency landing in Russia after mission to investigate the Black Knight, an extraterrestrial satellite in polar orbit. X-37C launched from Vandenberg Space Force Base. Jordon is training to fly "the XB-3 prototype". A lost cosmonaut is mentioned as having died on a pre-Gagarin flight to investigate the Black Knight.		
Ted Trammell MSE-Polyphemus: Howard (Captain) (no last name given); Beansy (USN) (Manned Spaceflight Engineer); Hollis (USN) (Manned Spaceflight Engineer) (no first names given for last two)	"The Astronaut" (2021), short story	Manned Spaceflight Engineer Program (MSEP): MSE-Polyphemus	1970s – 1980s
Ted Trammell MSE-Polyphemus: Howard (Captain) (no last name given); Beansy (USN) (Manned Spaceflight Engineer); Hollis (USN) (Manned Spaceflight Engineer) (no first names given for last two)	Unflown Apollo astronaut Howard, implied to be the astronaut character from The Exorcist (1973) (q.v.), takes part in a classified mission launched into retrograde orbit from Guiana Space Centre to deploy Lockheed Martin payload known as Charybdis. Howard and Trammell were members of Flight Group 13.		
Diaz, Cmdr.	Decommissioned (2021), short film	International Space Station	Contemporary/Near Future ("years" after 2006)
Diaz, Cmdr.	ISS astronaut has a chilling encounter with SuitSat.		
Calista "Callie" Rodriguez, Cmdr. Dan Patel (USN) (Mission Specialist)	First Woman: NASA's promise for humanity (2021), graphic novel	Artemis program	Near Future (c. 2030?) (Note: Vegetation lab on Moon base is called "Veggie Maker 2030".)
Calista "Callie" Rodriguez, Cmdr. Dan Patel (USN) (Mission Specialist)	Rodriguez is the first woman on the Moon and the main character in the graphic novel published by NASA. She is apparently also the first Hispanic/Latina person on the Moon. At the start of the graphic novel, Rodriguez lives on the Moon base she built.		
Skylab: D. Campbell (ESA) Jamestown 81: Ellen Wilson (née Waverly); Young; Murphy; Lee; Walker Jamestown 82: Allen; Harris; Heikkinen; Stewart Jamestown 83: Molly Cobb; Miller; Rodriguez; Cartwright Jamestown 84: Davis; Johnson; Pomepanz; Taylor Jamestown 85: Garcia; Hayes; Reed; Powell Jamestown 86: Howard; Kouri; Al Rossi; Tremblay; Williams Jamestown 87: Foster; Jones; Peterson; Price Jamestown 88: Nick Corrado; James; Petersen; Tuzell Jamestown 89: Cook; Deweese; Tracy Stevens; Rogers Jamestown 90: Dubois; Jacobs; DeLeon; O'Brien; Smith Jamestown 91: Bishop; Gatos; Gordo Stevens; Tremblay; White Apollo 75: Danielle Poole (list not complete)	For All Mankind Season 2 (2021), TV	United States: Jamestown Colony; LSAM (reusable lunar lander) Space Shuttle; Atlantis (OV-104); Beagle; Challenger (OV-099); Columbia (OV-102); Constitution; Discovery (OV-103); Endeavour (OV-105); Enterprise (OV-101); Kon-Tiki; Victoria; Pathfinder (OV-201) Skylab Soviet Union: Buran; Zvezda (moonbase)	1983 (Alternate History)
In the continuing alternate history, the lunar Jamestown Base has expanded into a colony with a population of about a dozen people. Space Shuttles are used for military and civilian missions, including crew rotation at Jamestown. Skylab provides an early warning of a solar flare. The US comes into dispute and conflict with the Soviet Union over lithium mining claims on the Moon, sending armed Marines to secure the site. Pathfinder is a next-generation air-launched single-stage to orbit shuttle using a NERVA engine. Apollo 75 is part of the Apollo-Soyuz Test Project, which takes place in 1983 in this timeline.
International Space Station: Dr. Kira Foster (USA); Commander Gordon Barrett (USA); Dr. Alexei Pulov (Russia); Christian Campbell (USA); Weronika Vetrov (Russia); Nikolai Pulov (Russia)	I.S.S. (2023), film	International Space Station Soyuz	Near Future
International Space Station: Dr. Kira Foster (USA); Commander Gordon Barrett (USA); Dr. Alexei Pulov (Russia); Christian Campbell (USA); Weronika Vetrov (Russia); Nikolai Pulov (Russia)	Mixed American-Russian crew in International Space Station during World War III.		
International Space Station: Johanna "Jo" Ericsson (ESA-Sweden); Ilya Andreev (FKA-Russia); Yasmina Suri (ESA-UK); Audrey Brostin (ESA-France); Paul Lancaster (NASA-USA)	Constellation (2024), TV	International Space Station Soyuz	2024
International Space Station: Johanna "Jo" Ericsson (ESA-Sweden); Ilya Andreev (FKA-Russia); Yasmina Suri (ESA-UK); Audrey Brostin (ESA-France); Paul Lancaster (NASA-USA)	An unidentified object collides with the ISS leading to the death of one of the five astronauts aboard and crippling most of the onboard systems and one of the Soyuz spacecraft. When Ericsson returns to earth with the body of her dead crewmate, she finds that parts of her life are missing or not as she remembers them.		
