= Economics of extraterrestrial resource extraction =

Economics of extraterrestrial resource extraction may refer to:

- Asteroid mining § Economics
- Colonization of the Moon § Economic prospecting and development
- Colonization of Mars § Economics
