= International Lunar Exploration Working Group =

The International Lunar Exploration Working Group (ILEWG) is a public forum sponsored by the world's space agencies to support "international cooperation towards a world strategy for the exploration and utilization of the Moon - our natural satellite" (International Lunar Workshop, Beatenberg (CH), June 1994).

ILEWG was founded by several space agencies: Australian Space Agency (ASA), Italian Space Agency (ASI), British BNSC, French CNES, German Aerospace Center, ESA, ISAS, NASA, Japanese NASDA, Roskosmos.

== Operations and conferences ==
ILEWG has been organising since 1994 the ICEUM International Conferences on Exploration & Utilisation of the Moon with published proceedings, and where community declarations have been prepared and endorsed by community participants. ILEWG has co-organised and co-sponsored lunar sessions at EGU, COSPAR, EPSC.

The 8th gathering was held on July 23–27, 2006, in Beijing, China, and agreed on the new Lunar Beijing Declaration.

=== Members ===
ILEWG Executive Director: Prof. Bernard Foing (ILEWG Past-President, 1998 - 2000)

ILEWG Vice-presidents: Prof. Tai Sik Lee (2016 - current), Prof. Jacques Blamont (2010 - 2016), Dr. Simonetta di Pippo (2006 – 2008), Dr Robert Richards (2005 - 2007)

ILEWG Past-Presidents : Dr. Michael Wargo (2008 - 2010), Prof. Wu Ji (2006 - 2008), Prof. Narendra Bhandari (2004 - 2006), Prof Carle Pieters (2002 – 2004), Prof Mike Duke (2000-2002), Prof Bernard Foing (1998 – 2000), Acad. Erik Galimov (1996 – 1998), Dr Hitoshi Mizutani

=== Roadmap ===
The roadmap or timeline envisaged includes a 15-year period of robotic operations before crewed missions. Robots would pilot in-situ resource utilisation and construct habitation for later crew.

== EuroMoonMars ==
As part of research efforts towards the colonization of Moon and eventually, the colonization of Mars, ILEWG founded the EuroMoonMars initiative, which comprises field campaigns in Moon-Mars analogue environments.

The EuroMoonMars field campaigns have been organised in specific locations of technical, scientific and exploration interest. The campaigns started with EuroGeoMars2009 (Utah MDRS, 24 Jan-1 Mar 2009) with ILEWG, ESA ESTEC, NASA Ames, VU Amsterdam and GWU.

=== EMMIHS Campaigns ===
Currently, ILEWG is collaborating with the International Moonbase Alliance (IMA) and the Hawaii Space Exploration Analog and Simulation (HI-SEAS) on a series of EuroMoonMars, IMA and HI-SEAS (EMMIHS) campaigns, at the HI-SEAS analogue facilities in Hawaii.

The Hawaii - Space Exploration Analog and Simulation (HI-SEAS) habitat is located at 8,200’ (2,500 meters) in elevation and IMA's founder, Henk Rogers, is its owner. As of 2018, IMA, an organization dedicated to building sustainable settlements on the Moon, has been organising regular simulated missions to the Moon, Mars or other planetary bodies at HI-SEAS. Dr. Michaela Musilova is the Director of HI-SEAS and she also takes part in missions as a Crew Commander, Flights Director or CAPCOM.

The EuroMoonMars campaigns consist of research activities for data analysis, instruments tests and development, field tests in Moon-Mars analogues, pilot projects, training and hands-on workshops and outreach activities.

=== EMM IgLuna 2019 Campaign ===
IgLuna is the first ESA Lab inter-University demonstrator project, and is hosted by the Swiss Space Centre (SSC) with the vision to create an analogue habitat inside lunar ice caps. The campaigns were held from 17 to 30 June 2019 and involved 18 student teams from 9 countries across Europe. The students developed modular demonstrators and tested them during a field test conducted inside the moon-like extreme environment of the Glacier Palace inside the Matterhorn glacier.

EuroMoonMars Field Campaigns
Year	Campaign	Notes
2009	EuroMoonMars-Eifel	Collaboration between ILEWG, ESA ESTEC, VU Amsterdam, Austrian Space Forum OEWF, GWU, Ecole de l’Air
2010	EuroMoonMars-DOMMEX	Collaboration between ILEWG, ESA ESTEC, NASA Ames, VU Amsterdam, GWU, Ecole de l’Air, FloridaTec, UCL Louvain
2010	EuroMoonMars SALM	La Réunion Island
2011	EuroMoonMars2011 (MDRS)	First EMM-MDRS mission
2012	EuroMoonMars2012 (MDRS)	Crew: Stoker, Battler, v’t Houd, Bruneau, Cross, Maivald, Svendsen, Oltheten, Nebergall, Orgel Support: Foing, Ehrenfreund, Elsaesser, Rammos, Rodrigues, Direito, Roling
2017	LunAres (Poland)	Crew: PMAS SGAC Support @ESTEC/Mission control: Foing, Lillo, Authier, Blanc et al.
2018	EMM-Iceland scouting campaign	Crew: Foing, Heemskerk, Sitnikova et al. Support: 4th Planet Logistics
2018	EMMIHS-0 (scouting campaign)	Crew: Rogers H&A, Foing, Wilhite, Machida Support: BluePlanet: Ponthieux, Cox et al.
2019	EMMIHS-I	Crew: Musilova, Sirikan, Mulder, Weert, Burstein, Pothier Support: BluePlanet: Foing, Ponthieux, Cox, Rogers
2019	EMM-IgLuna campaign	IgLuna SSC support: Benavides, EuroMoonMars VUA/ILEWG Crew: de Winter, Heemskerk, Albers, Clement, Bois, Daeter, Vaessen, Glukhova, Sitnikova, Dimova, Wanske, van der Sanden, Foing Support: Kruijver, Dingemans, Beentjes, Korthouwer, Moritz, Grosjean et al.
2019	EMMIHS-II	Crew: Musilova, Kerber, Castro, Wanske, Pouwels, d’Angelo Support: BluePlanet: Cox et al., support@ESTEC/VUA: Ageli, Foing, Heemskerk, Beniest, Sitnikova, Preusterink
2020	EMMIHS-III	Crew: Musilova M., Brasileiro L., Edison K., Heemskerk M&R, Rajkakati P. Support: BluePlanet & ESTEC/VUA
2020	EMMIHS-IV	Crew: to be confirmed Support: BluePlanet & ESTEC/VUA
2021	CHILL-ICE	Crew I: Kerber, Elwertowska, Poli Crew II: Cardinaux, Smith, Christianen Mission Control: Pouwels, Heemskerk, Kerber, Weert, Downes

== See also ==
- Exploration of the Moon
- International Mars Exploration Working Group
