= International Mars Exploration Working Group =

The International Mars Exploration Working Group (IMEWG) is a forum for space agencies and institutions to exchange ideas and information and discuss common strategy and initiatives for exploration of the planet Mars. The working group meets several times per year. Conceived in 1993, IMEWG's goal is to keep all parties informed and thereby avoid duplication of effort, and to discuss potential areas for collaboration/cooperation during the various phases of exploration.

Founding participants included NASA, ESA, several European national agencies and those of Japan and Russia. IMEWG was initially chartered with the following goals:

- Produce an international strategy for the exploration of Mars beyond the currently approved missions.
- Provide a forum for the coordination of future Mars exploration programmes.
- Examine the possibilities for an international Mars network mission as the next step beyond the 1996 opportunity.

The first IMEWG recommendations on an international strategy for Mars exploration, covering launch opportunities from 1996 to 2003, included an International Mars Network. The recommendations were presented at the COSPAR Symposium in Hamburg, 1994, and published.

The charter was updated in 1996 with the following goals:

- Produce and maintain an international strategy for the exploration of Mars.
- Provide a forum for the coordination of Mars exploration missions.
- Examine the possibilities for the next steps beyond the currently defined missions.

IMEWG meetings have also afforded an opportunity to reflect on the implications of mission losses for future programmes (e.g. in 2000).

Later IMEWG initiatives have covered themes such as exobiology, planetary protection, Mars Sample Return, lower cost missions, common standards and interoperability (e.g. for data relay), radioisotope power systems, terrestrial Mars analogues, and preparations for future human exploration.

The international Mars Architecture for the Return of Samples (iMARS) Working Group was chartered by IMEWG in mid-2006 to develop a potential plan for an internationally sponsored and executed Mars sample return (MSR) mission. An iMARS Phase 2 Working Group was constituted in 2014 for drafting a Mission Architecture and Science Management Plan for the return of samples from Mars.

In 2024 the IMEWG Terms of Reference were updated once more, with the objectives reformulated as follows:

1. Share information and plans relating to the development of national and international Mars exploration programs.
2. Encourage international co-operation and co-ordination in the development of Mars exploration programs.
3. Facilitate the interoperability of Mars exploration systems and minimize duplication.
4. Explore opportunities for collaboration and coordinated missions.

== Agencies Represented ==
- Australia: Australian Space Agency (ASA)
- Austria: Austrian Research Promotion Agency (FFG) (previously Austrian Space Agency (ASA))
- Belgium: Belgian Federal Science Policy Office (BELSPO)
- Brazil: Brazilian Space Agency (AEB)
- Canada: Canadian Space Agency (CSA)
- China: China National Space Administration (CNSA)
- Czech Republic: Czech Space Office (CSO)
- Europe: European Space Agency (ESA)
- Finland: Finnish Space Committee FSC (previously Finnish Meteorological Institute (FMI))
- France: Centre National d'Etudes Spatiales (CNES)
- Germany: German Aerospace Center (DLR) (previously Deutsche Agentur fiir Raumfahrtangelegenheiten (DARA))
- Greece: Hellenic Space Center (HSC)
- Iceland: Iceland Space Agency ISA
- India: Indian Space Research Organisation (ISRO)
- Italy: Agenzia Spaziale Italiana (ASI)
- Japan: Japan Aerospace Exploration Agency (JAXA) (previously Institute of Space and Astronautical Science (ISAS))
- Mongolia: Mars V
- Netherlands: Netherlands Space Agency (NLSA)
- Norway: Norwegian Space Agency (NOSA)
- Poland: Polish Space Agency (POLSA)
- Russia: Roscosmos (previously Russian Space Agency (RKA))
- Saudi Arabia: Saudi Space Agency (SSA) (previously Saudi Space Commission (SSC))
- South Korea: Korea Aerospace Research Institute (KARI)
- Spain: Agencia Espacial Española (AEE) (previously Center for the Development of Industrial Technology (CDTI))
- Sweden: Swedish National Space Agency (SNSA) (previously Swedish National Space Board (SNSB))
- Switzerland: Swiss Space Office (SSO)
- Thailand: Geo-Informatics and Space Technology Development Agency (GISTDA)
- United Arab Emirates: UAE Space Agency (UAESA)
- United Kingdom: UK Space Agency (UKSA) (previously British National Space Centre (BNSC))
- United States: National Aeronautics & Space Administration (NASA)

== See also ==
- International Lunar Exploration Working Group
