= Lunar Expeditionary Complex =

Historical Soviet Lunar base proposal

The LEK Lunar Expeditionary Complex was a lunar expedition and Moon base proposed by Valentin Glushko in 1974 as a Soviet response to the United States' Apollo program and as a successor to the Zvezda moonbase, which was based on the cancelled N1-L3 crewed Moon expedition program. If implemented, it was intended to have been operational by 1980 and used for scientific and engineering research.

== Hardware ==
The Vulkan-LEK project was based on new superheavy launcher developed in Glushko's bureau.

The moonbase design consisted of a number of modules, including:

- Lunokhod, an 8-ton pressurized lunar rover to be used to build the base and for expeditions.
- The LZM ("Laboratory-Factory Module"), a 15.5-ton pressurized module to be used for oxygen production and scientific experiments.
- The LZhM ("Laboratory-Habitation Module"), 21.5-ton habitation module where cosmonauts were to reside.
- A nuclear power station to provide electricity.
- A simple transport vehicle to ferry supplies to and from a lunar orbit.

== Project termination ==
The project was cancelled in 1976 when a Russian Academy of Sciences Commission ruled that resources should be targeted toward projects primarily adding economic value rather than for national prestige.

== See also ==
- Zvezda (moonbase)
- Soviet Moonshot
- Space race
