= Lunar Explorers Society =

Space advocacy organization

The Lunar Explorers Society is an organisation dedicated to achieving permanent presence of humanity on the Moon. The Society is open to all people in the world with an interest in lunar exploration. It hopes to bring the best of humanity to the Moon, and to bring the benefits of the Moon to all people on Earth.

The last human mission to the Moon was in 1972, and though the first exploration efforts provided a huge scientific return, no further human exploration of the Moon has been done. However, several robotic lunar exploration missions have been conducted since the beginning of the 1990s. These missions fuelled the desire to return to the Moon among many lunar enthusiasts, and this was the background for the establishment of the Lunar Explorers Society in 2000.

The founding members saw the need for an organisation where the members could share knowledge, join forces and pursue their ultimate goal: To establish a permanent human presence on the Moon to the benefit of all people on Earth.

== Objectives ==
- To support the establishment of a permanent human presence on the Moon
- To promote international cooperation between scientists working with Lunar exploration by providing a neutral platform for their discussions
- To raise awareness of what could be achieved by returning to the Moon through educational and outreach activities
- To promote the peaceful and fair use of the resources available on the Moon, to the benefit of mankind

== The Young Lunar Explorers Award ==
The Young Lunar Explorers Award is presented to a candidate who has been instrumental in promoting lunar exploration among young lunar explorers once per year, at the annual International Conference on the Exploration and Utilisation of the Moon (ICEUM). The awards have been given to the following winners:

- 2008: The Google Lunar X Prize Foundation
- 2007: The Lunar Explorers Society
- 2005: The SSETI Express team
- 2004: International Space University (ISU)

== History ==
The Lunar Explorers Society was founded 14 July 2000, during the 4th International Conference on the Exploration and Utilisation of the Moon (ICEUM4). There, the 156 ICEUM4 participants signed the founding declaration of the Lunar Explorers Society. The International Lunar Exploration Working Group (ILEWG) has supported the Lunar Explorers Society since the beginning
