= Anne Elizabeth =

American romance novel writer

Anne Elizabeth (Swepston)
- Born: United States
- Occupation: Novelist
- Writing career
- Pen name: Anne Elizabeth
- Period: 2006–present
- Genres: Romance, Military/Romantic Suspense, Comics, Graphic Novels
- Notable awards: L.A. Banks Warrior Woman Award RWA Service Award 2017
- Website: www.anneelizabeth.net

Anne Elizabeth is an American romance novel writer. She also writes graphic novels and comics. Elizabeth is a member of the Authors Guild and Romance Writers of America.

== Biography ==
Anne Elizabeth is from Greenwich, Connecticut. She attended Greenwich Academy and later graduated from Boston University. Her comics and graphic novel series, Pulse of Power, is based in Greenwich, Connecticut, and New York City. She is married to a member of SEAL Team ONE and they are active in the Navy SEAL Community. She lives in the mountains above San Diego, California, with her husband.

== Awards ==
Elizabeth was the second annual winner of the L.A. Banks Warrior Woman Award at the Romantic Times Booklovers Convention. In 2017, she was awarded the RWA Service award at the Romance Writers of America convention.

== Writing ==
Elizabeth writes in three genres: romance, military romance and comics. Her first romance stories were published in anthologies: Zane's Flava series beginning in 2006, Highland Press's military romance series (2007 - 2009): Operation L.O.V.E., Holiday Op, and For Your Heart Only. Her military romance novels primarily focus on U.S. Navy SEALs and Spec Ops Groups. Her first U.S. Navy SEAL based romance novel, A SEAL at Heart, was published by Sourcebooks, Inc. in 2012. The collection, Hot Alpha Seals, with her story "The Kiss of a Seal", reached number 44 on the USA Today book bestseller list and number 23 on the New York Times list. She writes the stories for graphic novels and comics.

== Columnist and Interviewer ==
From 2008 through 2014, Elizabeth was the columnist on comics, manga and graphic novels for Romantic Times, RT Book Reviews. She performed interviews with published writers and graphic artists. She also wrote comic industry news updates and feature columns. Elizabeth is also a frequent presenter at Romance Writers of America conventions as well as Romantic Times.

== Books ==
=== West Coast Navy SEALs ===
1. A SEAL at Heart (2012, Sourcebooks, Inc., ISBN 978-1402268908)
2. Once a SEAL (2013, Sourcebooks, Inc., ISBN 978-1402268939)
3. A SEAL Forever (2014, Sourcebooks, Inc., ISBN 978-1402268960)
4. The Kiss of a SEAL (2015, Bravo Zulu, ASIN B00PKL1ITG)
5. The Soul of a SEAL (2016, Sourcebooks Casablanca, ISBN 978-1-4926-2224-6)

== Short stories ==
=== Navy SEAL stories In anthologies ===
- Operation: L.O.V.E., "Funny Bone" (2009, Highland Press)
- Hot Alpha SEALS Military Romance Megaset, "The Kiss of a SEAL" (2014, Hot Alpha Authors)
- "The Way of the Warrior" (2015, Sourcebooks, Inc.)

=== Other stories ===
- Zane's Caramel Flava, "Sugar & Butter Poured Over Muscle" (2006, Atria/Simon & Schuster)
- Recipe For Love, "A Heart's Hunger" (2007, Highland Press)
- Zane's Honey Flava, "Dragon's Breath" (2008, Atria/Simon & Schuster)
- Holiday Op, "Tied With A Bow", (2009, Highland Press)
- For Your Heart Only, "Good Vibrations" (2010, Highland Press)

== Graphic novels ==
- Pulse of Power, Dynamite, 2010 (with Brett Booth (Cover Design) and Marcio Fiorito (Artist) ) ISBN 978-1606901700
- The Pendulum, Sea Lion Books, 2011 (with Alisa Kwitney (Editor), Siya Oum (Illustrator) ) ISBN 978-0982818633
- The Power Play, A Story From The Pulse of Power World, Bravo Zulu Studios, 2012

== Comics ==
=== Hall of Insides ===
1. Hall of Insides, Volume 1 (2011, Bravo Zulu Studios)
2. The Wizard vs. the Hairy Willets, Volume 2 (2014, Bravo Zulu Studios)
3. Bully Boys, Volume 3 (2014, Bravo Zulu Studios)
4. The Zentopedes, Volume 4 (2014, Bravo Zulu Studios)
5. Truth Man, Volume 5 (2014, Bravo Zulu Studios)
- The Hall of Insides Collection, Truth and Consequences (2015, Bravo Zulu Studios)

=== Zombie Power ===
- Zombie Power, Volume 1 (2012, Bravo Zulu Studios)
- Volume 2 (2014, Bravo Zulu Studios)
- Willie's Journal, Volume 3 (2014, Bravo Zulu Studios)
