= Energia Lunar Expedition =

Proposed Soviet Lunar program

Program overview
- Country: Soviet Union
- Organization: Roscosmos
- Purpose: Soviet manned lunar settlement
- Status: canceled

Program history
- Launch site(s): Baikonur Cosmodrome

Vehicle information
- Launch vehicle(s): Energia

The Energia Lunar Expedition was a project that was proposed by Soviet engineer Valentin Glushko in 1988 which would’ve aimed to create a lunar base using the Energia rocket. The lunar base was to then be eventually used for mining helium-3 from the lunar surface.

== Hardware ==
The Energia expeditions involved at least two sections of hardware, which were placed into a low Earth orbit in separate Energia launches.

== See also ==
- Soviet Moonshot
- Space race
