= Vladimir Barmin =

Soviet scientist

- Владимир Бармин
- V.P. Barmin (1909–93)
- Born: Vladimir Pavlovich Barmin; 4 March [O.S. 19 February] 1909; Moscow, Moscow Governorate, Russian Empire
- Died: July 17, 1993 (aged 84); Moscow, Russia
- Citizenship: Russia
- Education: Bauman Moscow State Technical University
- Engineering career
- Discipline: Engineering (mechanical)
- Employer: GSKB Spetsmash
- Projects: Soviet space program
- Significant design: Site 1/5 at Baikonur Cosmodrome; R-7 rocket

Vladimir Pavlovich Barmin (Russian: Владимир Павлович Бармин; 4 March [O.S. 19 February] 1909 – 17 July 1993) was a Russian engineer in the former Soviet space program who is remembered for being the designer of the first Soviet rocket launch complexes in the Soviet space program.

An asteroid, 22254 Vladbarmin, was named in his honor.

== Biography ==
Barmin was born on 4 March [O.S. 19 February] 1909 in Moscow, Russia. He was educated in mechanical engineering topics involving in thermodynamics, refrigeration, compressor and heat exchangers at the MVTU and later specialized in refrigeration from the Moscow Mechanical Institute. Sponsored by the Soviet politician, Sergo Ordzhonikidze, Barmin paid a visit to the United States in 1935–36 to learn about refrigeration to help develop the production of fridges to be widely used in everyday life in Russia.

Upon returning to Russia in 1936, Barmin helped establish a factory for domestic production compressor construction and refrigeration engineering. In 1942-44, Barmin was involved in war efforts against Germany and worked on a first Katyusha rocket launcher project for the Red Army. Furthermore, he was involved in developing rocket propellents and compressor for Soviet rockets and artillery ammunitions for the Red army during easter front of the World War II.

Over several decades and years of his life, Barmin was associated with the construction of the space launch complexes in the Baikonur Cosmodrome as part of the Soviet space program.

== Honours and awards ==
- Hero of Socialist Labour (1956)
- Lenin Prize (1957)
- Stalin Prize (1943)
- USSR State Prize, three times (1967, 1977, 1985)
- Six Orders of Lenin
- Order of the October Revolution
- Order of Kutuzov 1st class
- Order of the Red Banner of Labour, twice
- Jubilee Medal "In Commemoration of the 100th Anniversary of the Birth of Vladimir Ilyich Lenin"
- Medal "In Commemoration of the 800th Anniversary of Moscow"
