= Colonization of the Moon =

Settlement on the Moon

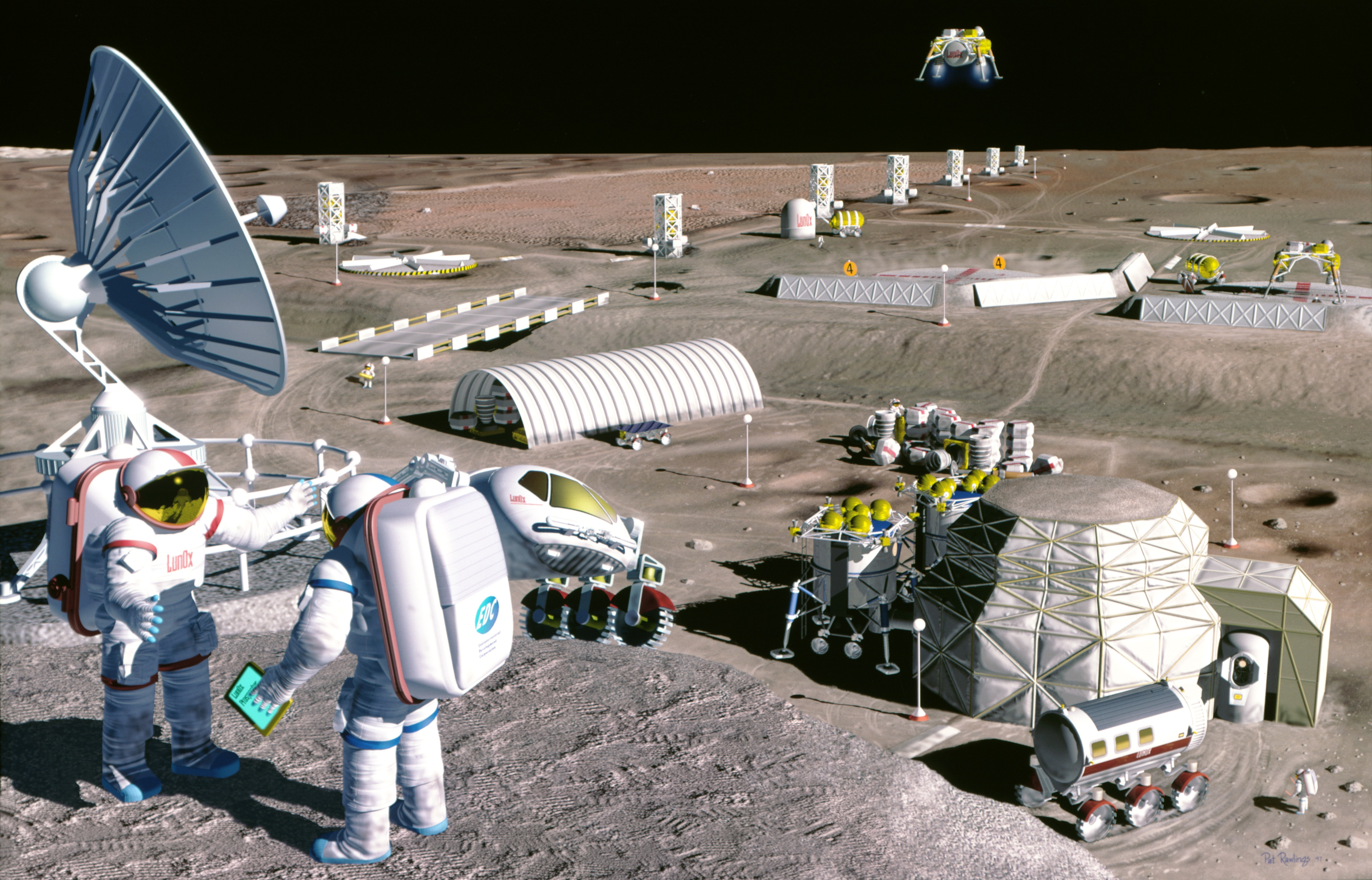
NASA concept art of an envisioned lunar mining facility

The colonization of the Moon is a process or concept employed by some proposals for robotic or human mining and settlement endeavours on the Moon. The use of the term "colonization" has become contested for perpetuating colonial frameworks in space.

Laying claim to the Moon has been declared illegal through international space law and no state has made such claims, despite having a range of probes and artificial remains on the Moon.

While a range of proposals for missions of lunar colonization, exploitation or permanent exploration have been raised, current projects for establishing permanent crewed presence on the Moon are not for colonizing the Moon, but rather focus on building moonbases for exploration and to a lesser extent for exploitation of lunar resources and energy. Overall, there is a greater tendency to shift industrial activities to the Moon.

The commercialization of the Moon is a contentious issue for national and international lunar regulation and laws (such as the Moon treaty).

== History ==
Colonization of the Moon has been imagined as early as the first half of the 17th century by John Wilkins in A Discourse Concerning a New Planet.

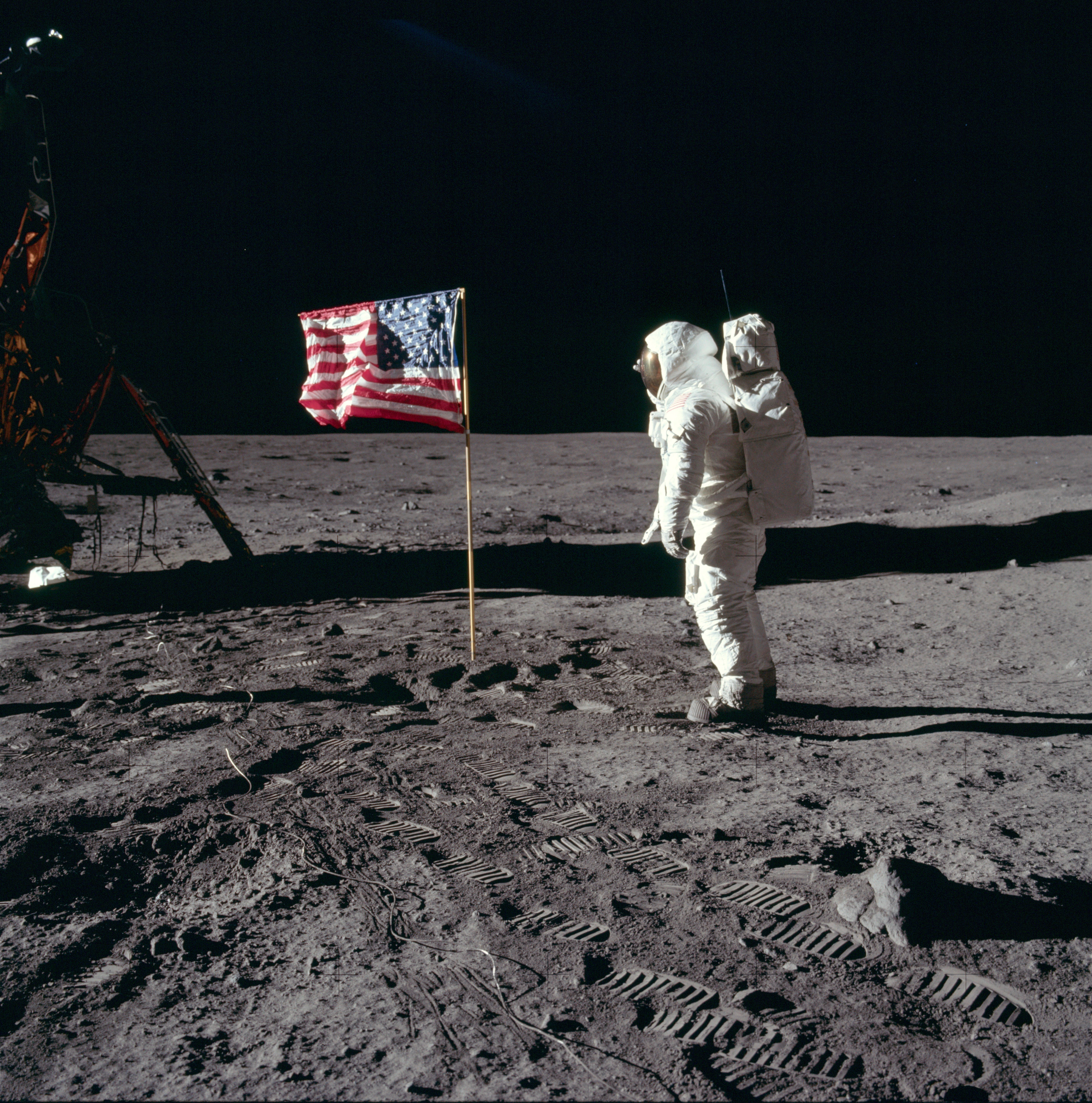
In the early Space Age the USSR and the US engaged in dropping pennants and raising flags on the Moon, like this Lunar Flag Assembly of 1969, but agreed internationally in 1967 with the Outer Space Treaty to not lay any claims over the Moon or any other celestial bodies.

Colonization of the Moon as a material process has been taking place since the first artificial objects reached the Moon after 1959. Luna landers scattered pennants of the Soviet Union on the Moon, and U.S. flags were symbolically planted at their landing sites by the Apollo astronauts, but no nation claims ownership of any part of the Moon's surface. Russia, China, India, and the U.S. are party to the 1967 Outer Space Treaty, which defines the Moon and all outer space as the "province of all mankind", restricting the use of the Moon to peaceful purposes and explicitly banning military installations and weapons of mass destruction from the Moon.

The landing of U.S. astronauts was seen as a precedent for the superiority of the free-market socioeconomic model of the U.S., and in this case as the successful model for space flight, exploration and ultimately human presence in the form of colonization. In the 1970s the word and goal of colonization was discouraged by NASA and funds as well as focus shifted away from the Moon and particularly to Mars. But the U.S. eventually nevertheless opposed the 1979 Moon Agreement which aimed to restrict the exploitation of the Moon and its resources. Subsequently, only 17 states are parties to the treaty as of september 2026, none of which engage in self-launched human space exploration.

After U.S. missions in the 1990s suggested the presence of lunar water ice, its actual discovery in the soil at the lunar poles by Chandrayaan-1 (ISRO) in 2008–2009 renewed interest in the Moon. A range of moonbases have been proposed by states and public actors. Currently the U.S.-led international Artemis program seeks to establish with private contractors a state run orbital lunar way-station in the late 2020s, and China proposed with Russia the so-called International Lunar Research Station to be established in the 2030s and aim for an Earth-Moon Space Economic Zone to develop by 2050.

Current proposals mainly have the goal of exploration, but such proposals and projects have increasingly aimed for enabling exploitation or commercialization of the Moon. This move to exploitation has been criticized as colonialist and contrasted by proposals for conservation (e.g. by the organization For All Moonkind), collaborative stewardship (e.g. by the organization Open Lunar Foundation, chaired by Chris Hadfield) and the Declaration of the Rights of the Moon, drawing on the concept of the Rights of Nature for a legal personality of non-human entities in space.

== Missions ==
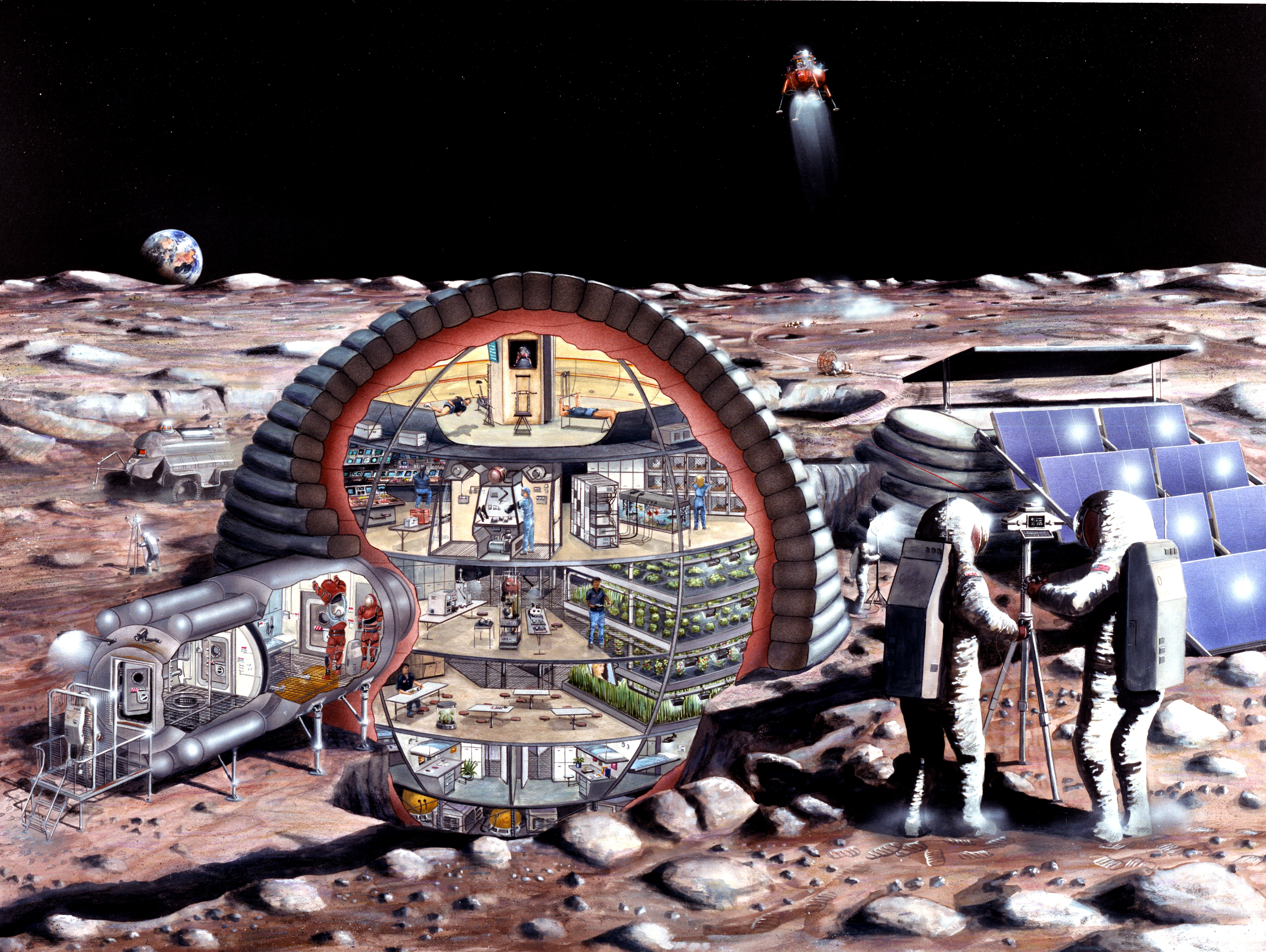
Inflatable module for lunar base.

The colonization of the Moon has been pursued and advocated for by a range of civil actors and space advocacy groups since the advent of spaceflight, mainly to establish a permanent human presence and settlement on the Moon.

States have explicitly refrained from calling for lunar colonization and particularly from laying any claims of territory on the Moon, in accordance with international bans on any such claims.

States though have been pursuing the establishment of moonbases, the first being the temporary Tranquility Base of Apollo 11 in 1969, the first crewed mission on the Moon. Those and contemporary concepts and plans for moonbases have had the purpose to advance spaceflight and space exploration.

Contemporary plans for moonbases, such as the leading Artemis program and International Lunar Research Station projects, have supported in-situ resource utilization and therefore prospecting for lunar resources. To complement the Artemis program, private commercial space enterprise and services have been enabled and contracted.

== Law ==
Although Luna landers scattered pennants of the Soviet Union on the Moon, and U.S. flags were symbolically planted at their landing sites by the Apollo astronauts, no nation claims ownership of any part of the Moon's surface. Likewise no private ownership of parts of the Moon, or as a whole, is considered credible.

The 1967 Outer Space Treaty defines the Moon and all outer space as the "province of all mankind". It restricts the use of the Moon to peaceful purposes, explicitly banning military installations and weapons of mass destruction. A majority of countries are parties of this treaty. The 1979 Moon Treaty was created to elaborate, and restrict the exploitation of the Moon's resources by any single nation, leaving it to a yet unspecified international regulatory regime. As of January 2020, it has been signed and ratified by 18 nations.

Since 2020, countries have joined the U.S. in their Artemis Accords, which are challenging the treaty. The U.S. has furthermore emphasized in a presidential executive order ("Encouraging International Support for the Recovery and Use of Space Resources.") that "the United States does not view outer space as a 'global commons'" and calls the Moon Agreement "a failed attempt at constraining free enterprise".

With Australia signing and ratifying both the Moon Treaty in 1986 as well as the Artemis Accords in 2020, there has been a discussion if they can be harmonized. In this light an Implementation Agreement for the Moon Treaty has been advocated for, as a way to compensate for the shortcomings of the Moon Treaty and to harmonize it with other laws and agreements such as the Artemis Accords, allowing it to be more widely accepted.

In the face of such increasing commercial and national interest, particularly prospecting territories, U.S. lawmakers have introduced in late 2020 specific regulation for the conservation of historic landing sites and interest groups have argued for making such sites World Heritage Sites and zones of scientific value protected zones, all of which add to the legal availability and territorialization of the Moon.

In 2021, the Declaration of the Rights of the Moon was created by a group of "lawyers, space archaeologists and concerned citizens", drawing on precedents in the Rights of Nature movement and the concept of legal personality for non-human entities in space.

== Economic prospecting and development ==
For long-term sustainability, a space colony should be close to self-sufficient. Mining and refining the Moon's materials on-site – for use both on the Moon and elsewhere in the Solar System – could provide an advantage over deliveries from Earth, as they can be launched into space at a much lower energy cost than from Earth. It is possible that large amounts of cargo would need to be launched into space for interplanetary exploration in the 21st century, and the lower cost of providing goods from the Moon might be attractive.

=== Space-based materials processing ===
In the long term, the Moon will likely play an important role in supplying space-based construction facilities with raw materials. Microgravity in space allows for the processing of materials in ways impossible or difficult on Earth, such as "foaming" metals, where a gas is injected into a molten metal, and then the metal is annealed slowly. On Earth, gas bubbles may rise or fall due to their relative density to air, but in a zero gravity environment this does not happen. The annealing process requires large amounts of energy, as a material is kept very hot for an extended period of time (allowing the molecular structure to realign), and this too may be more efficient in space, as the vacuum drastically reduces all heat transfer except through radiative heat loss.

=== Exporting material to Earth ===
Exporting material to Earth in trade from the Moon is problematic due to the cost of transportation, which would vary greatly if the Moon is industrially developed. One suggested trade commodity is helium-3 (^{3}He) which is carried by the solar wind and accumulated on the Moon's surface over billions of years, but occurs only rarely on Earth. Helium-3 might be present in the lunar regolith in quantities of 0.01 ppm to 0.05 ppm (depending on soil). In 2006 it had a market price of about $1,500 per gram ($1.5M per kilogram), more than 120 times the value per unit weight of gold and over eight times the value of rhodium.

In the future ^{3}He harvested from the Moon may have a role as a fuel in thermonuclear fusion reactors. It should require about 100 metric tons (220,000 lb) of helium-3 to produce the electricity that Earth uses in a year and there should be enough on the Moon to provide that much for 10,000 years.

In 2024, an American startup called Interlune announced plans to mine helium on the Moon for export to Earth. The first mission plans to use NASA's Commercial Lunar Payload Services program to arrive on the moon.

=== Exporting propellant obtained from lunar water ===
To reduce the cost of transport, the Moon could store propellants produced from lunar water at one or several depots between the Earth and the Moon, to resupply rockets or satellites to deep space.

==== Lunar water ice ====
Video of the lunar south pole, showing areas of permanent shadow over several months (several lunar days)

Lunar scientists had discussed the possibility of water repositories for decades. They are now increasingly "confident that the decades-long debate is over" a report says. "The Moon, in fact, has water in all sorts of places; not just locked up in minerals, but scattered throughout the broken-up surface, and, potentially, in blocks or sheets of ice at depth." The results from the Chandrayaan mission are also "offering a wide array of watery signals."

It is estimated there is at least 600 million tons of ice at the north pole in sheets of relatively pure ice at least a couple of meters thick.

=== Solar power satellites ===
Gerard K. O'Neill, noting the problem of high launch costs in the early 1970s, proposed building Solar Power Satellites in orbit with materials from the Moon. Launch costs from the Moon would vary significantly if the Moon is industrially developed. This proposal was based on the contemporary estimates of future launch costs of the Space Shuttle.

On April 30, 1979, the Final Report "Lunar Resources Utilization for Space Construction" by General Dynamics Convair Division under NASA contract, NAS9-15560 concluded that the use of lunar resources would be cheaper than terrestrial materials for a system comprising as few as thirty Solar Power Satellites of 10 GW capacity each.

In 1980, when NASA's launch cost estimates for the Space Shuttle were grossly optimistic, O'Neill et al. published another route to manufacturing using lunar materials with much lower startup costs. This 1980s SPS concept relied less on human presence in space and more on partially self-replicating systems on the lunar surface under telepresence control of workers stationed on Earth.

== See also ==
- Aurora programme
- Colonization of Mars
- Lunar Explorers Society
- Lunar Gateway
