= List of fictional astronauts (modern period, works released 2000–2009) =

Lists of fictional astronauts
Early period	Project Mercury	Project Gemini
Project Apollo	1975–1989	1990–1999
2000–2009	2010–2029	Moon
Inner Solar System	Outer Solar System	Other
Far future

The following is a list of fictional astronauts from recent times, mostly using the Space Shuttle and International Space Station, as depicted in works released between 2000 and 2009.

== 2000–2009 ==
Name(s)	Appeared in	Program / Mission / Spacecraft	Fictional date
(2000–2009)
Linda Gardner (Note: Last name given only in Library of Congress Cataloging-in-Publication Data on p. 2.); Unnamed commander Unnamed pilot Unnamed doctor Four other astronauts	Astronaut: Living in Space (2000), picture book	Space Shuttle; Atlantis	Contemporary
Linda Gardner; Unnamed commander Unnamed pilot Unnamed doctor Four other astronauts	On her fourth spaceflight, Linda repairs space telescope.		
Diego Irigayen	DC Comics (2000– )	S.T.A.R. Labs	Contemporary
Diego Irigayen	Astronaut whose mother's murder leads him to become the superhero Imán.		
Mir: Vladimir Kinotskin (Commander); Tsimion Borisovich Vladovka (Note: Patronymic not given; deduced from father's name.); Tufts (USA) (no first name given); Rodya Baklunov (relieves Tufts) Relief crew: Misha Sorokin; Ivan Pkhalaze; Bobchek (no first/last name given)	Fall of a Cosmonaut (2000), novel	Mir; Space Shuttle	Contemporary
Mir: Vladimir Kinotskin (Commander); Tsimion Borisovich Vladovka; Tufts (USA) (no first name given); Rodya Baklunov (relieves Tufts) Relief crew: Misha Sorokin; Ivan Pkhalaze; Bobchek (no first/last name given)	One year after Vladovka returns from Mir, Chief Inspector Porfiry Petrovich Rostnikov investigates his disappearance.		
International Space Station: John Radkowski (USAF) (Commander); Tanisha Yvonne "Tana" Jackson, M.D./Ph.D. (Medical officer/biologist); Ryan Martin (Canada) (Systems engineer); Britta Silverthorne; Brittany; Jasmine (no last names given for last two); Unnamed station physician Unnamed personnel Mirusha: Two unnamed cosmonauts	Mars Crossing (2000), novel	NASA: Space Shuttle; International Space Station; CRV-1 (Crew return vehicle) Russia: Mirusha ("Little Mir") (Space station); Soyuz	2020s
International Space Station: John Radkowski (USAF) (Commander); Tanisha Yvonne "Tana" Jackson, M.D./Ph.D. (Medical officer/biologist); Ryan Martin (Canada) (Systems engineer); Britta Silverthorne; Brittany; Jasmine (no last names given for last two); Unnamed station physician Unnamed personnel Mirusha: Two unnamed cosmonauts	Crew members overlapping on ISS missions. Radkowski attempts rescue of Mirusha crew using CRV.		
NASA: Ted Blackstone; Pete Slendwick, Col. Victor Carlson ShareSpace: Fred Gernsback (Citizen Observer/Journalist); David Calderon (Citizen Observer) Columbia: Billy Kingston (CDR); Wes Packard (PLT); Damian "Damy" Agustino (Military Payload Specialist); Lorena Charette, Maj. (M.D.) (USAF); Marc Akira Clement, Dr. (Astronomy Mission Specialist); Josh Pritkin (Electronics Mission Specialist); Michael Tyree "MJ" James (Citizen Observer) International Space Station: Carl Tanaka, Maj. (Commander); Doris McIntyre (Medical/Biological Mission Specialist); Stephen Tebworthy (UK) (Microgravity welding specialist) StarRescue: Scott Blackstone (USAF) (Pilot); Nick Blackstone (Flight Engineer); Ed Killeret (Engineer)	The Return (2000), novel	American Space Universal (ASU)/ShareSpace: Space Shuttle; Columbia International Space Station; Soyuz Republic Wright (RW): StarRescue (Lifting body)	c. 2003 (October–November, June)
Basketball superstar James is killed in apparent accident aboard Columbia; Pakistan detonates "proton bomb" in space, necessitating rescue of ISS crew. Scott Blackstone is a former NASA astronaut who flew three shuttle missions. Ted Blackstone was Nick and Scott Blackstone's uncle, killed in T-38 crash shortly after becoming astronaut.
Frank Corvin (USAF); William "Hawk" Hawkins, Col. Jerry O'Neill "Tank" Sullivan; Ethan Glance; Roger Hines	Space Cowboys (2000), film	Space Shuttle; Daedalus	Autumn 1999
Frank Corvin (USAF); William "Hawk" Hawkins, Col. Jerry O'Neill "Tank" Sullivan; Ethan Glance; Roger Hines	NASA astronauts on a satellite salvage mission.		
Christopher "Chief" Hart, Col.	The Switch (2000), novel	Space Shuttle	Contemporary
Christopher "Chief" Hart, Col.	Career astronaut accused of murder.		
David Ziegler, Dr. (Payload Specialist); Unnamed astronauts	The West Wing; What Kind of Day Has It Been (2000), TV	Space Shuttle; Columbia	Contemporary
David Ziegler, Dr. (Payload Specialist); Unnamed astronauts	Shuttle crew's reentry is delayed when starboard payload bay door fails to close. Ziegler, the brother of White House Communications Director Toby Ziegler, is on his fourth shuttle mission.		
Gordon Brunswick (CDR); Sarah Drummond-Fournier, Ph.D. (Payload Specialist); Four unnamed astronauts	All Families are Psychotic (2001), novel	Space Shuttle; Discovery	2001
Gordon Brunswick (CDR); Sarah Drummond-Fournier, Ph.D. (Payload Specialist); Four unnamed astronauts	Grown-up thalidomide baby Sarah plans to have sex in orbit with Commander Brunswick.		
International Space Station: Unnamed commander (US); Sergei Viktor "Serg" Dudayev (Russia) (Mission Specialist); Unnamed mission specialist (US/UNSC); Unnamed British astronaut Unnamed Japanese astronaut Endeavour: Diane Williams, Col. (USMC) (CDR); Gary McGregor, Capt. (USAF) (PLT); Frank Ward, Col. (US Army/UNSC) (Space Marine); Three unnamed Space Marines (UNSC) Jake Cohen (CAPCOM); Unnamed astronaut (PROP)	Flight of Endeavour (2001), novella	International Space Station Space Shuttle; Endeavour; Astronaut Maneuvering Vehicle (AMV)	Near Future
International Space Station: Unnamed commander (US); Sergei Viktor "Serg" Dudayev (Russia) (Mission Specialist); Unnamed mission specialist (US/UNSC); Unnamed British astronaut Unnamed Japanese astronaut Endeavour: Diane Williams, Col. (USMC) (CDR); Gary McGregor, Capt. (USAF) (PLT); Frank Ward, Col. (US Army/UNSC) (Space Marine); Three unnamed Space Marines (UNSC) Jake Cohen (CAPCOM); Unnamed astronaut (PROP)	When Chechen sympathizer Dudayev seizes control of ISS weapons systems, three-time space shuttle veteran Williams commands mission to retake control of ISS.		
Clarence "Biff" Barnes, Capt./Maj. (USAF) (Mission Commander); Jim Scarelli (Pilot); Steve Skeldon, Capt. (USMC) (Navigator/Copilot); Andre Baker, Capt. (US Army) (Weapons Officer); Ray McConnell (Flight Engineer); Sue Tillman, Lt. (Note: Service branch specified as USN in 2015 novel, but not in novella.) (Sensor Officer)	Lash-Up (2001), novella	U.S. Space Force: Defender (modified VentureStar) (single-stage-to-orbit spaceplane)	September 16 – December 2, 2010
Clarence "Biff" Barnes, Capt./Maj. (USAF) (Mission Commander); Jim Scarelli (Pilot); Steve Skeldon, Capt. (USMC) (Navigator/Copilot); Andre Baker, Capt. (US Army) (Weapons Officer); Ray McConnell (Flight Engineer); Sue Tillman, Lt. (Sensor Officer)	China destroys GPS satellites using space gun, impairing American military effectiveness. U.S. establishes Space Force and launches Defender to protect satellites. Barnes is a former NASA astronaut who flew one previous mission. Expanded into novel in 2015 (q.v.).		
Phil McCarty (CDR); Five unnamed astronauts Jacob "Jake" Worthy (Civilian)	The Outer Limits; The Vessel (2001), TV	USAS: Space Shuttle; Inspire	Near Future (after 2003)
Phil McCarty (CDR); Five unnamed astronauts Jacob "Jake" Worthy (Civilian)	Worthy, the first author in space, is sole survivor of space shuttle crash at end of 10-day orbital mission.		
Dex Decker	V.I.P. Val in Space (2001), TV	NASA Porter Aerospace	Contemporary
Dex Decker	Astronaut who flew experimental commercial spacecraft to rescue six cosmonauts from Mir comes under threat while guarded by Vallery Irons Protection.		
Grace Street, Dr.	Gloria Rising (2002), chapter book	Space Shuttle; International Space Station	Contemporary
Grace Street, Dr.	Fourth-grader Gloria Jones meets Dr. Street in a supermarket checkout line.		
Tom Banks; Patrick (no last name given) STS-124: Corrine Anne Atkinson (CDR); Mikhail "Mike" Wright (USAF) (PLT); Jimmy Westmoreland (Mission Specialist-One); Frank Smothers (Mission Specialist-Two); Stephen Philips (Payload Specialist)	Her Perfect Stranger (2002), novel	Space Shuttle; STS-124 International Space Station	Contemporary
Tom Banks; Patrick (no last name given) STS-124: Corrine Anne Atkinson (CDR); Mikhail "Mike" Wright (USAF) (PLT); Jimmy Westmoreland (Mission Specialist-One); Frank Smothers (Mission Specialist-Two); Stephen Philips (Payload Specialist)	After one-night stand as strangers, Atkinson and Wright learn they are teamed on next shuttle mission. Atkinson is a four-time shuttle pilot; Wright has two previous spaceflights.		
Ralphy Bird (Note: Not explicitly stated to be an astronaut.); Chip Hornbeck; Waldo Weeks	Kidnapped at the Capital (2002), chapter book	International Space Station	Contemporary
Ralphy Bird; Chip Hornbeck; Waldo Weeks	Astronauts fired by NASA who plot to take over International Space Station.		
Julie Foley	Men with Brooms (2002), film		Contemporary
Julie Foley	Astronaut for the American Space Agency (ASA).		
Chuck Taggart; Kurt Mendel; Neil Taggart; Sarah Forbes; Angela Perry	Odyssey 5 (2002), TV	Space Shuttle; Odyssey	August 7, 2007, time travel to 2002
Chuck Taggart; Kurt Mendel; Neil Taggart; Sarah Forbes; Angela Perry	Crew sent back in time five years by a being called the Seeker to attempt to prevent the destruction of Earth. (Note: Part of the pilot episode's plotline is based on that of Quatermass II.)		
"Mitch" Mitchell (CDR); Unnamed PLT; Stan (no last name given)	Project Viper (2002), TV movie	NASA: Space Shuttle; Olympus (Note: The name Odyssey appears on the shuttle's wing in exterior shots.)	Contemporary/Near Future (October)
"Mitch" Mitchell (CDR); Unnamed PLT; Stan (no last name given)	Astronauts killed by organism designed for terraforming of Mars. The STS number appears on the astronauts' shirts but is difficult to read.		
Enterprise: Sharon Waltham, Capt. Pierre Falawn, Maj. (France) (Relief pilot); George Terhune, Prof. (Com specialist); Susan (no last name given) Atlantis: Unnamed commander Unnamed pilot Unnamed astronauts Discovery: Unnamed astronauts	Stony Man; Sky Killers (2002), novel	Space Shuttles; Enterprise; Atlantis; Discovery	Contemporary
Enterprise: Sharon Waltham, Capt. Pierre Falawn, Maj. (France) (Relief pilot); George Terhune, Prof. (Com specialist); Susan (no last name given) Atlantis: Unnamed commander Unnamed pilot Unnamed astronauts Discovery: Unnamed astronauts	Enterprise is destroyed in orbit by stealth satellite using railgun. Atlantis launch is aborted due to irregular booster firing pattern; crew escapes using slidewire system. Discovery launches successfully with replacements for destroyed satellites.		
Joe (Commander) (USA) (no last name given); Ciba Weber, Dr. (USA); Vladimir (Russia) (no last name given)	Y: The Last Man (2002–2008), comic book series	International Space Station; Soyuz	c. 2002 – 2006
Joe (Commander) (USA) (no last name given); Ciba Weber, Dr. (USA); Vladimir (Russia) (no last name given)	Crew aboard ISS when mysterious plague kills nearly all male mammals on Earth.		
Robert Iverson, Cmdr. Rebecca "Beck" Childs, Maj. Timmins (Flight Engineer)	The Core (2003), film	Space Shuttle; Endeavour (STS-114 (?) / Spacelab)	Contemporary
Robert Iverson, Cmdr. Rebecca "Beck" Childs, Maj. Timmins (Flight Engineer)	Shuttle crew who make an emergency landing on Sepulveda Dam spillway.		
Igor Fedrov	Kosmonaut (aka The Cosmonaut) (2003), short film	Soyuz	1991
Igor Fedrov	Cosmonaut on solo mission is stranded in orbit after fall of Soviet Union.		
NASA: Michelle Robeson, Dr. STS-118: John Cost, Capt. (Commander/Pilot); Muswell (no first name given); Five unnamed astronauts	Orbiter (2003), graphic novel	Space Shuttle; Venture (STS-118)	Near Future
NASA: Michelle Robeson, Dr. STS-118: John Cost, Capt. (Commander/Pilot); Muswell (no first name given); Five unnamed astronauts	Venture disappears from Earth orbit, causing NASA to abandon human spaceflight. Ten years later, Venture mysteriously reappears, technologically altered and with only Cost aboard. Robeson flew on the final flight of shuttle Endeavor (sic); Cost previously flew on STS-109.		
NASA: Unnamed astronaut candidates Atlantis: Unnamed American astronauts Endeavor: Unnamed astronauts Alpha: Lawton, Col. (Station Commander) (no first name given); Heather Charney, Lt. Unnamed cosmonauts and taikonauts	The Orion Protocol (2003), novel	Space Shuttle; Atlantis Space Shuttle; Endeavor (sic) International Space Station Alpha	Near Future (Note: Year implied to be 2005 or 2009.) (January 27 – February 21)
NASA: Unnamed astronaut candidates Atlantis: Unnamed American astronauts Endeavor: Unnamed astronauts Alpha: Lawton, Col. (Station Commander) (no first name given); Heather Charney, Lt. Unnamed cosmonauts and taikonauts	Testing and deployment missions for space weapons system known as Project Orion.		
Jeff Hale, Cmdr. (USAF); Scotty (no last name given)	Riverworld (2003), TV movie	Space Shuttle; Frontier	2009
Jeff Hale, Cmdr. (USAF); Scotty (no last name given)	When meteors strike Frontier during reentry, Hale finds himself in the bizarre afterlife known as Riverworld.		
Marina Potaski	Воры и проститутки (Vory i prostitutki) (2003), Russian film	Soyuz TM	1999
Marina Potaski	TV reporter Marina Potaski travels to Mir to persuade a cosmonaut to return to Earth when he is unwilling to abandon the space station.		
Robert Parker (NASA); Yuri Andropov (FKA); Hideki Kawahara (JAXA)	The Day After Tomorrow (2004), film/novel	International Space Station	2007
Robert Parker (NASA); Yuri Andropov (FKA); Hideki Kawahara (JAXA)	ISS crew observes Earth entering an Ice Age.		
Rick Monroe; Brian Poole	"Falling Star" (2004), short story	International Space Station	2050s (July)
Rick Monroe; Brian Poole	Decades after computer virus devastates human civilization, Monroe reminisces about being one of the last astronauts aboard ISS.		
Rose Siciliano, CMDR (USN)	Force Protection (2004), novel	Space Shuttle	August 1999
Rose Siciliano, CMDR (USN)	US Navy pilot, who has just completed the NASA training program and finds herself under threat of assassination following a terrorist attack in Kenya.		
Musa Khiromanovich Ivanov, Cmdr. (FKA); Anatole Konstantinovich Krivalapov, Flight Engineer (FKA); Sable Jones (NASA)	Time's Eye (2004), novel	Soyuz-TMA	2037
Musa Khiromanovich Ivanov, Cmdr. (FKA); Anatole Konstantinovich Krivalapov, Flight Engineer (FKA); Sable Jones (NASA)	Personnel returning from the International Space Station pass through a temporal discontinuity shortly after undocking.		
Jonas Venture, Dr. Thaddeus S. "Rusty" Venture, Dr. Dean Venture; Henry Allen "Hank" Venture; Brock Samson; Anna Baldavich, Lt. Bud Manstrong, Col.	The Venture Bros. Careers in Science (2004), TV	Gargantua-1 (Space station); Shuttle 2	1971 / Contemporary
Jonas Venture, Dr. Thaddeus S. "Rusty" Venture, Dr. Dean Venture; Henry Allen "Hank" Venture; Brock Samson; Anna Baldavich, Lt. Bud Manstrong, Col.	Decades after Jonas Venture builds space station, his son and teenage grandsons are called in when a malfunction occurs.		
Ron Scott (Flight Commander); Kate (Note: The book is inconsistent about whether Kate's real name is Kathleen or Kathryn. See pp. 8, 85 and 313.) Daniels, Ph.D. (Copilot); Al Murphy; Robert Paxton (Mission Specialist); Terri Schmidt (Mission Specialist); Leo Smith	The Korean Intercept (2005), novel	Space Shuttle; Liberty (Shuttle Flight 72-L)	Near Future (November)
Ron Scott (Flight Commander); Kate Daniels, Ph.D. (Copilot); Al Murphy; Robert Paxton (Mission Specialist); Terri Schmidt (Mission Specialist); Leo Smith	Shuttle crash-lands near North Korean/Chinese border.		
Jo Rodriguez, Dr. (Payload Specialist)	Maya & Miguel; Career Day (2005), TV	Space Shuttle	Contemporary
Jo Rodriguez, Dr. (Payload Specialist)	Miguel Santos spends Career Week with aerospace engineer Rodriguez.		
Viktor Zinchenko	Monarch of the Glen; Series 7, Episode 3 (2005), TV	Soviet Union/Russia	2005
Viktor Zinchenko	Former cosmonaut, a veteran of six spaceflights, is potential investor for turning Scottish estate into luxury resort.		
Lei Dongjin, Lt. Col. Lin Xi, Maj.	Shenzhou (spacecraft) (2005), Chinese TV	Shenzhou	2003
Lei Dongjin, Lt. Col. Lin Xi, Maj.	30-part TV dramatisation about the events leading up to China's first human spaceflight, Shenzhou V, in 2003. Two PLAAF pilots, a man and a woman, are the leading contenders to become the first Chinese nationals to be sent into space.		
Unnamed pilot	"Toy Planes" (2005), short story	Unknown (Caribbean island nation): Spaceplane	Near Future
Unnamed pilot	Caribbean island nation launches spaceplane using balloon platform.		
International Space Station: Robert Iverson (NASA); Harlan Scott (NASA); Sergei Veronkova (Russian Space Agency) Unnamed CAPCOM	The West Wing; Things Fall Apart, 2162 Votes (2005), TV	International Space Station Air Force Space Command: Military Space Shuttle	Contemporary
International Space Station: Robert Iverson (NASA); Harlan Scott (NASA); Sergei Veronkova (Russian Space Agency) Unnamed CAPCOM	Astronauts endangered by ISS oxygen leak could potentially be saved by secret military space shuttle.		
Charles Farmer Doug Masterson, Col. (USAF)	The Astronaut Farmer (2006), film	Mercury; The Dreamer	Contemporary
Charles Farmer Doug Masterson, Col. (USAF)	Ex-USAF pilot with degree in aerospace engineering builds his own Mercury capsule and Atlas launch vehicle for a self-funded flight in Earth orbit. Masterson is a friend of Farmer and a shuttle astronaut.		
NASA: "Shorty" Boudreau (Chief of the Astronaut Office); Cyndi Ludlow; Sam Warden (Mission Specialist) Mir: Brian Kincheloe; Two unnamed Russian cosmonauts STS-106: Bill Kokernot (CDR); Elise Trube (PLT); Brian Kincheloe (Mission Specialist); Lori Primus (Mission Specialist) STS-108: Terry "Surly" Bonds (CDR); Tom "Tom Terrific" Terassky (PLT); Lucy Thorne Kincheloe, Ph.D. (Mission Specialist 1); Buddy Santos (Mission Specialist 2/Flight Engineer); Chuck Nethercott (Mission Specialist 3); Patti Halapeska (Mission Specialist 4)	Challenger Park (2006), novel	Mir Space Shuttle: STS-106 (Atlantis); STS-108 (Endeavour); International Space Station	c. 1998 c. 2002 (from February)
Four years after her husband's troubled mission to Mir, Lucy Kincheloe balances professional and personal responsibilities. Boudreau is a veteran of early shuttle missions in the 1980s. Bonds flew five previous shuttle missions.
Two unnamed astronauts	Curious George; Curious George's Rocket Ride (2006), TV Curious George Discovers Space (2015), picture book (Note: Adaptation of Curious George episodes "Curious George's Rocket Ride" and "Red Planet Monkey".)	International Space Station	Contemporary
Two unnamed astronauts	Curious George brings supplies to astronauts on ISS.		
Steven Wagner; Three unnamed astronauts	Monk; Mr. Monk and the Astronaut (2006), TV	Altman Aerodynamics: Rocket plane Epsilon	November 2010
Steven Wagner; Three unnamed astronauts	Space shuttle veteran Wagner finds a way to kill his ex-lover from orbit.		
Johannes Igby, Prof. (Payload Specialist); Lawrence Fleinhardt, Ph.D. (Prof.) (Alternate Payload Specialist) Discovery (return flight): Unnamed commander and pilot Larry Fleinhardt (Mission Specialist); Mitchell (Mission Specialist); Bradley (Payload Specialist); Garcia-Romero (Payload Specialist); Sullivan (Payload Specialist) (no first names given for last four)	Numb3rs; Brutus, Killer Chat, The Art of Reckoning (2006–2007), TV	Space Shuttle; Discovery International Space Station	2007
Johannes Igby, Prof. (Payload Specialist); Lawrence Fleinhardt, Ph.D. (Prof.) (Alternate Payload Specialist) Discovery (return flight): Unnamed commander and pilot Larry Fleinhardt (Mission Specialist); Mitchell (Mission Specialist); Bradley (Payload Specialist); Garcia-Romero (Payload Specialist); Sullivan (Payload Specialist) (no first names given for last four)	When Igby is forced to pull out of mission, Fleinhardt spends four months and 12 days aboard ISS.		
George Andrews (ASA chief astronaut) Intrepid: Bill Campbell (Pilot/Astronaut); Kip Dawson (Passenger) Soyuz: Sergei Mikhailovich Petrov; Mikhail Rychov	Orbit (2006), novel	American Space Adventures (ASA): Intrepid (Air-launched spacecraft) Soyuz	May 16 – 21, 2009
George Andrews (ASA chief astronaut) Intrepid: Bill Campbell (Pilot/Astronaut); Kip Dawson (Passenger) Soyuz: Sergei Mikhailovich Petrov; Mikhail Rychov	Contest winner Dawson is stranded in low Earth orbit after micrometeor impact kills Campbell. Andrews is a former NASA astronaut.		
Denise Washington	The Space Mission Adventure (2006), chapter book	Space Shuttle (STS-116); International Space Station	Contemporary
Denise Washington	Astronaut (apparently based on Joan Higginbotham) scheduled for mission the following year speaks to Space Camp students.		
Unnamed commander Unnamed pilot Unnamed engineer (Note: Played by Sir Richard Branson.); Unnamed specialist (Note: Played by Sam Branson.)	Superman Returns (2006), film	USAF/Virgin Galactic: Genesis (VRSC 1) (air launch to orbit shuttle)	Contemporary/Near Future
Unnamed commander Unnamed pilot Unnamed engineer Unnamed specialist	Air launch from USAF Boeing 777 goes wrong due to mysterious power outage.		
Calvin Howard, Col. James Adams, Cmdr. Bob Reid, Col.	Bones; Spaceman in a Crater (2007), TV	NASA: Space Shuttle; International Space Station National Space Agency Space Travel Coalition (STC)	Contemporary
Calvin Howard, Col. James Adams, Cmdr. Bob Reid, Col.	Howard's dead body is found in crater in the desert.		
The Man with the Yellow Hat	Curious George; Grease Monkeys in Space (2007), TV	Unknown	Contemporary
The Man with the Yellow Hat	Mission to repair Einstein-Pizza Space Telescope.		
Steve Wilcox, Capt. (Commander); Stan (Co-pilot); William	The Dead Zone; Re-Entry (2007), TV	Go Space Corporation: America's Hope (spaceplane)	Contemporary
Steve Wilcox, Capt. (Commander); Stan (Co-pilot); William	Crew of corporation's first orbiter is endangered by meteor strikes.		
Luke Nelson, Cmdr. Jessica Hart, Lt. (PLT); Sandra Delgado, Lt. Craig Hurley, Maj. (USAF); Mike Dolan	Law & Order: Criminal Intent; Rocket Man (2007), TV	National Space Agency (NSA): Space Shuttle	Contemporary
Luke Nelson, Cmdr. Jessica Hart, Lt. (PLT); Sandra Delgado, Lt. Craig Hurley, Maj. (USAF); Mike Dolan	One month before she is scheduled to become youngest astronaut in space, shuttle pilot Hart is murdered in hotel room. Nelson and Delgado previously flew two missions together. Story partly inspired by Lisa Nowak case.		
Unnamed cosmonaut (Latvia?)	Men in Space (2007), novel	Soyuz?	December 15, 1992 – Spring 1993
Unnamed cosmonaut (Latvia?)	Cosmonaut stranded in orbit due to collapse of Soviet Union.		
NASA; Ruth Goldman, Dr; Bill Wallace; Derek Mills FKA; Nikola Ulinov, Cmdr.	Plague Year: A Novel (2007), novel	International Space Station Space Shuttle; Endeavour	Near Future
NASA; Ruth Goldman, Dr; Bill Wallace; Derek Mills FKA; Nikola Ulinov, Cmdr.	Astronauts trapped in orbit when a nanotech plague renders large parts of the Earth's surface uninhabitable.		
Yukari Morita, Cmdr. Matsuri Morita, Backup Cmdr. Akane Miura, Specialist	Rocket Girls (2007), anime (based on the 1995 light novel of the same name)	Solomon Space Association: Tanpopo; Coconut Mangosteen	Contemporary
Yukari Morita, Cmdr. Matsuri Morita, Backup Cmdr. Akane Miura, Specialist	Teenage pilots of the fictional Solomon Space Association (SSA), a Japanese private space company, are trained to perform orbital repairs on satellites and later assist the Space Shuttle Atlantis in launching the unmanned Orpheus probe to Pluto. Tanpopo and Coconut are single-person capsules, while Mangosteen is designed for two crew.		
Unnamed astronaut	Underdog (2007), film	NASA: Space Shuttle	Contemporary
Unnamed astronaut	Astronaut on EVA who sees Underdog floating through space.		
Atlantis: Benjamin "Tuck" Tucker, Jr., Cmdr. (USN) (CDR); Jessica Ault (PLT); Jared Finn (Canadian Space Agency) (Mission Specialist); Jodie Law (Mission Specialist); Russ Deaver (Senior Payload Specialist); Vincent Pistacchia, Jr. Rick "Raygun" Van Duren (USN) (CAPCOM) Legacy: Benjamin Tucker, Jr. (Commander); Lance Campbell (Pilot); Passengers: Daki Abe; Theodore Burke, Ph.D. (United States Secretary of State); James Donnelly (Journalist); Ginny Lin	Zero-G (2007), novel	NASA: Space Shuttle; Atlantis SpaceVentures, Inc.: Legacy (Air-launched spaceplane)	Contemporary
Atlantis: Benjamin "Tuck" Tucker, Jr., Cmdr. (USN) (CDR); Jessica Ault (PLT); Jared Finn (Canadian Space Agency) (Mission Specialist); Jodie Law (Mission Specialist); Russ Deaver (Senior Payload Specialist); Vincent Pistacchia, Jr. Rick "Raygun" Van Duren (USN) (CAPCOM) Legacy: Benjamin Tucker, Jr. (Commander); Lance Campbell (Pilot); Passengers: Daki Abe; Theodore Burke, Ph.D. (United States Secretary of State); James Donnelly (Journalist); Ginny Lin	Tucker is sole survivor of Atlantis mission when his crewmates are poisoned by adulterated SAS patches. Eighteen months later, Tucker commands first commercial suborbital spaceflight with passengers. Campbell is a former NASA astronaut.		
Four unnamed astronauts	Astronaut Handbook (2008), picture book	Space Shuttle	Contemporary
Four unnamed astronauts	Bug-eyed young astronauts train for spaceflight.		
Daan Sapp (ESA); Unnamed astronauts (China, ESA, JAXA, RKA)	Batman and the Outsiders; The Snare (2008), graphic novel	ESA space shuttle International Space Station	Contemporary
Daan Sapp (ESA); Unnamed astronauts (China, ESA, JAXA, RKA)	Astronauts possessed by aliens in order to build particle weapon in lunar orbit. Dutch astronaut Sapp dies under hypnosis by Looker.		
Kanemoto Akira Takahara Kohei	The Clone Returns Home (aka The Clone Returns to the Homeland) (2008), film	Space Development Society (ASDA) (Japan): Space Station	Near Future
Kanemoto Akira Takahara Kohei	After Kanemoto dies in a space station EVA accident, Takahara agrees to take part in a human cloning experiment, allowing him to be regenerated after he also dies during an EVA.		
Richard Finley, Col. (USMC) ISS/Atlantis: Marga Jannsen (ESA); Lance Corliss (Payload Specialist)	Law & Order: Special Victims Unit; Lunacy (2008), TV	NASA: International Space Station Space Shuttle; Atlantis	October 19 – 21, 2008
Richard Finley, Col. (USMC) ISS/Atlantis: Marga Jannsen (ESA); Lance Corliss (Payload Specialist)	Murdered Belgian astronaut Jannsen is found floating in river. Finley is an X-15, Apollo, Skylab, Approach and Landing Tests and Shuttle veteran.		
Unnamed Captain; Janice (USA) (no last name given); Sledge (USA) (biologist) (no other name given); Keldysh (Russia) (no first name given); Mstislav (Russia) (physician) (no last name given); Zamyatin (Russia) (no first name given)	"Lostronaut" (2008), short story	Northern Lights (space station)	Near Future (November 4 – March 19)
Unnamed Captain; Janice (USA) (no last name given); Sledge (USA) (biologist) (no other name given); Keldysh (Russia) (no first name given); Mstislav (Russia) (physician) (no last name given); Zamyatin (Russia) (no first name given)	Astronauts trapped in Earth orbit by Chinese mines around space station.		
Two unnamed astronauts	NASA Launch Gone Wrong (2008), web video	NASA: Space Shuttle?	Contemporary
Two unnamed astronauts	Astronauts argue about whether they need to bring their own lunch on spaceflight.		
Emerson (Commander); Pritchard, Lt. (no first names given)	Onion News Network; Astronauts Suffer Agonizing, High-Pitched Death After Helium Leak (2008), web video	NASA: International Space Station	Contemporary
Emerson (Commander); Pritchard, Lt. (no first names given)	Astronauts killed by bizarre malfunction aboard ISS.		
Robert Barrett (Mission Specialist/Protective Protocol Engineer); Cheryl; Dan (no last names given for last two)	Onion News Network; Astronaut Suspects NASA Using Him To Test Space's Effects On Fat People (2008), web video	NASA: International Space Station	Contemporary
Robert Barrett (Mission Specialist/Protective Protocol Engineer); Cheryl; Dan (no last names given for last two)	Conversation between Barrett and ground control.		
Shenzhou 6: Xue Zhinuan; Tong Shun; Sun Bai; Jiang Chin Unnamed mission: Zhang Tong	Onion News Network; China Launches First Willing Manned Mission Into Space (2008), web video	China National Space Administration: Shenzhou 6 Unnamed mission	2005 Contemporary
Shenzhou 6: Xue Zhinuan; Tong Shun; Sun Bai; Jiang Chin Unnamed mission: Zhang Tong	Zhang becomes first voluntary taikonaut in Chinese space program previously used to get rid of political prisoners.		
Travis O'Brien	Onion News Network; NASA Simulator Prepares Astronauts For Rigors Of An Interview With Larry King (2008), web video	NASA	Contemporary
Travis O'Brien	ONN reporter tries out NASA's Larry King interview simulator. Astronaut O'Brien recently returned from 18-month space mission.		
Rick "Killer Whale" Robertson (CDR); Bill "Wolverine" White (PLT); Laurel "Condor" Freeman (Payload Commander); Kenai "Nanook" Munro, Ph.D. (Payload Specialist); Mike "Alligator" Williams, Ph.D. (Mission Specialist); Sheik Jilal al-Hussein (Spaceflight participant)	Prepared for Rage (2008), novel	Space Shuttle; Endeavour	November 2006 – July 2008
Rick "Killer Whale" Robertson (CDR); Bill "Wolverine" White (PLT); Laurel "Condor" Freeman (Payload Commander); Kenai "Nanook" Munro, Ph.D. (Payload Specialist); Mike "Alligator" Williams, Ph.D. (Mission Specialist); Sheik Jilal al-Hussein (Spaceflight participant)	Islamic terrorists attempt to shoot down shuttle Endeavour and its "Carnivore Crew".		
Patrick Shane McLanahan, Lt. Gen. (USAF); Hunter "Boomer" Noble, Capt. (USAF) (XR-A9 spacecraft commander); Lisette "Frenchy" Moulain, Lt. Cmdr. (USN) (XR-A9 spacecraft commander); Jim Terranova, Maj. (USMC) (XR-A9 mission commander); Wayne "Whack" Macomber, Maj. (USAF); Chris Wohl, MSgt. (USMC); Charlie Turlock, Capt. (Army National Guard); Valerie "Seeker" Lukas, MSgt. (USAF) (Armstrong Space Station sensor operator); Ann Page, Ph.D. (Skybolt free-electron laser designer/operator); Unnamed Armstrong Space Station personnel	Shadow Command (2008), novel	Armstrong Space Station (aka "Silver Tower"); XR-A9 Black Stallion spaceplane (Single-stage-to-orbit)	February 2009
Space warfare personnel during international crisis involving Russia and Iran. Moulain is a former NASA space shuttle pilot and commander. Armstrong Station introduced in Silver Tower (q.v.).
Dustin "Dusty" Chambers, Lt. Vince "Winger" Patrecchio; Randy "Screwball" (No last name given); Mitch "Brooklyn" (No last name given) Guardian Rescue Mission: Lincoln "Lightning" Ripley, Lt. Col. (USAF) (Commander); Shelly London (Co-Pilot); Paul "Gunner" (Mission Specialist) (No last name given)	Cosmic Rendezvous (2009), novel	NASA; Guardian Rescue Mission (GRM): Draco (air launch to orbit spacecraft)	Contemporary
Dustin "Dusty" Chambers, Lt. Vince "Winger" Patrecchio; Randy "Screwball" (No last name given); Mitch "Brooklyn" (No last name given) Guardian Rescue Mission: Lincoln "Lightning" Ripley, Lt. Col. (USAF) (Commander); Shelly London (Co-Pilot); Paul "Gunner" (Mission Specialist) (No last name given)	Space Shuttle veteran Ripley romances spacecraft designer London while training for secret military mission.		
Sokolov (Flight Engineer)	Cosmonaut (2009), short film	Soyuz-TMA	September 16, 2008
Sokolov (Flight Engineer)	Cosmonaut removed from ISS crew and launched on secret mission.		
S.H.I.E.L.D. orbital station: Abigail Brand, Agt. Peter Corbeau, Agt. Unnamed S.H.I.E.L.D. space force personnel	Iron Man: Armored Adventures "Fun With Lasers" (2009), TV	S.H.I.E.L.D. orbital station	Contemporary
S.H.I.E.L.D. orbital station: Abigail Brand, Agt. Peter Corbeau, Agt. Unnamed S.H.I.E.L.D. space force personnel	S.H.I.E.L.D. agents aboard space station taken over by Arthur Parks, the Living Laser.		
Unnamed astronaut	Land of the Lost (2009), film	Unknown	Contemporary
Unnamed astronaut	Reentering astronaut finds himself in parallel dimension.		
William "Bull" Ellis (USN); Mick Breem	Life; Re-Entry (2009), TV	Space Shuttle	2009
William "Bull" Ellis (USN); Mick Breem	Three-time Shuttle pilot Ellis, who was planning to pay $35 million for flight on Russian spacecraft, is shot to death while flying a small plane.		
Madison (CDR) (no first name given); Miranda Bach, Capt. (Payload Commander); Unnamed astronauts	Lost Tapes; Alien (2009), TV	Space Shuttle; Mission T-258	Spring 2008
Madison (CDR) (no first name given); Miranda Bach, Capt. (Payload Commander); Unnamed astronauts	Bach is infected by alien spores from comet dust during EVA, causing alien creature to grow inside her.		
Chaz Dalton (PLT?); Three unnamed astronauts	My Name Is Earl; Chaz Dalton's Space Academy (2009), TV	Space Shuttle	Contemporary
Chaz Dalton (PLT?); Three unnamed astronauts	Dalton is impersonated by former NASA colleague to run space camp for kids.		
Atlantis: Seven unnamed astronauts	The Right Stuff (2009), novel	Space Shuttle; Atlantis International Space Station	Contemporary (Late April)
Atlantis: Seven unnamed astronauts	Shuttle crew makes transoceanic abort landing at Morón Air Base in Spain.		
London Tipton; Albert Barker	The Suite Life on Deck; The Wrong Stuff (2009), TV	Tipton 1 (space station)	Contemporary
London Tipton; Albert Barker	Teenage heiress Tipton chooses senior citizen Barker to accompany her to her father's space station.		
Astronaut Mike Dexter	30 Rock; Dealbreakers Talk Show#0001, Don Geiss, America and Hope, Emanuelle Goes to Dinosaur Land (2009–2010), TV	N/A	Contemporary
Astronaut Mike Dexter	Imaginary boyfriend of Liz Lemon.		
