= Y: The Last Man (TV series) =

American drama television series

- Genre: Action-adventure; Drama; Post-apocalyptic
- Based on: Y: The Last Man by Brian K. Vaughan and Pia Guerra
- Developed by: Eliza Clark
- Starring: Diane Lane; Ashley Romans; Ben Schnetzer; Olivia Thirlby; Juliana Canfield; Elliot Fletcher; Marin Ireland; Amber Tamblyn; Diana Bang
- Composer: Herdís Stefánsdóttir
- Country of origin: United States
- Original language: English
- No. of seasons: 1
- No. of episodes: 10

Production
- Executive producers: Brian K. Vaughan; Pia Guerra; Melina Matsoukas; Louise Friedberg; Mari Jo Winkler-Ioffreda; Nina Jacobson; Brad Simpson; Eliza Clark
- Producers: Anna Beben; Nellie Reed
- Cinematography: Kira Kelly; Catherine Lutes; Claudine Sauvé
- Editors: Amy Fleming; Melissa Lawson Cheung; Rockie Stephens; Louise A. Innes
- Running time: 47–54 minutes
- Production companies: Future Investigations; Color Force; Witch's Mark Productions; FXP

Original release
- Network: FX on Hulu
- Release: September 13 – November 1, 2021

Y: The Last Man is an American post-apocalyptic drama television series developed by Eliza Clark based on the comic book series of the same name by Brian K. Vaughan and Pia Guerra. In the series, a mysterious cataclysmic event simultaneously kills every mammal with a Y chromosome—except for Yorick Brown and his monkey–and follows him as he traverses the new world.

The series began development at FX in October 2015, with a pilot ordered and filmed in 2018. A first season was greenlit in 2019 with Clark replacing original showrunners Michael Green and Aida Mashaka Croal. Filming began in 2020, with several casting changes, including the lead role of Yorick. It premiered on September 13, 2021, on FX on Hulu, and Star with Disney+ in other territories, and stars Diane Lane, Ashley Romans, Ben Schnetzer, Olivia Thirlby, and Amber Tamblyn. It received generally positive reviews from critics, but was canceled in October 2021, after one season. The series was removed from Hulu and Disney+ on May 26, 2023, making it unavailable to stream on any platform in the United States or anywhere else.

== Premise ==
Y: The Last Man takes place in a post-apocalyptic world where a mysterious cataclysmic event simultaneously killed every mammal with a Y chromosome but for one man – Yorick Brown (Ben Schnetzer) – and his male pet monkey Ampersand. The series follows Yorick as he traverses the new world, as its survivors struggle with their losses and attempt to restore world society—led by Yorick's mother, who is the new U.S. President, Jennifer Brown (Diane Lane).

=== Gender effects ===
In the original comic book series, every animal with a Y chromosome instantaneously dies at the same time, including most mammals. (Birds, reptiles, amphibians, fish, and invertebrates are unaffected because they mostly use different sex chromosomes.) While transgender people did not feature heavily in the original comic, it was mentioned that trans men survived due to not having Y chromosomes.

The producers aimed to update and expand on the ramifications of this, to reflect changing societal attitudes in the West toward gender in the almost two decades since the comic began. The showrunners specified that trans women with Y chromosomes also died, as did women with androgen insensitivity who were unaware they possessed Y chromosomes. The showrunners also added a trans male character to the regular cast (Sam Jordan, played by Elliot Fletcher), who does not have a direct counterpart in the original comic, to expand on this world-building.

Speaking at the August 2021 TCA panel, showrunner Eliza Clark said, "Yorick's maleness is not what sets him apart in this world — it's his Y chromosome that sets him apart. Gender is diverse and chromosomes are not equal to gender. And so, in our world — in the world of the television show — every living mammal with a Y chromosome dies. Tragically, that includes many women; it includes non-binary people; it includes intersex people ... We are making a show that affirms that trans women are women, trans men are men, non-binary people are non-binary, and that is part of the richness of the world we get to play with."

Cast member Fletcher said that, "In this world post the event, gender is somewhat irrelevant. I think one of the hilarious things about this show is that post the event, Yorick can walk around without a mask on because he's assumed to be trans, rather than pre-the-event, people are assumed to be cisgender. And so, I just think it flips the traditional idea of gender completely on its head, and so I was very comfortable joining a project that knew that ahead of time and committed to it fully."

=== Societal effects ===
Showrunner Eliza Clark explained that the writing team tried to analyze the logical ripple effects of what would happen if all people with Y chromosomes died instantaneously. She said she was surprised at how even by 2020, there is still a large gender disparity in many aspects of essential infrastructure, ranging from the electrical power grid to something as basic as trucking to keep supply lines functional: "Basically what I learned is that our entire economy runs on trucks. So, if you're living in a city, you know when you go to a grocery store that grocery store needs two deliveries a day to be stocked for the number of people who are shopping [at] it, and they don't have storage. I think 5% of truck drivers are women."

Clark went on to say, that while all people with Y chromosomes are suddenly killed off, essentially removing the gender binary divide among the survivors, the resulting society that develops over the course of the series is not egalitarian. Other social divisions remain based on race, sexual orientation, politics, or wealth.

=== Governmental effects ===
In the United States, Republican president Ted Campbell dies along with his vice president, most of both houses of Congress, and six out of nine Supreme Court Justices (including men as well as women who died in accidents resulting from the event). The presidential line of succession is killed wholesale, losing the Speaker of the House, President pro tempore of the Senate, and (seemingly) all Cabinet officials. The surviving congresswomen hastily elevate the Chair of the House Intelligence Committee (Jennifer Brown, a Democrat) as Speaker, and in turn (within one hour) swear the new Speaker in as President.

President Campbell's politically active daughter Kimberly Campbell Cunningham begins rallying the surviving Republican congresswomen, urging that they were the lawfully elected party in power before the die-off, while Brown's new Executive branch was not elected but came into power through line of succession. There was also a higher ratio of female Democratic members than Republicans, at least temporarily tipping the balance in the surviving government.

Only two women were Cabinet heads – but Secretary of Education Abbott was born in Antigua and thus not eligible. The only eligible Cabinet head was Regina Oliver, who was visiting Israel at the time of the event and presumed dead. Later, however, it is discovered that Oliver survived: she was injured in a building collapse and left in a coma for several weeks, but recovers. Oliver is described even by moderate Republicans as a far-right radical who President Campbell only appointed to a minor Cabinet position as a concession to far-right swing voters. Even Kimberly Campbell's surviving Republican caucus considers Oliver a fringe lunatic, leaving them conflicted about pushing for her to replace Brown as president.

The effect of the die-off on other countries is not discussed in detail in the first season, in part because the world has been thrown into such chaos that even Jennifer Brown's fragile emergency administration still doesn't know. Other countries with few or no women in leadership positions fared much worse than the United States, which was itself crippled. In the third episode, it is briefly mentioned that the Russian government tried to spread propaganda that their male leadership had survived in isolation, but when rioters stormed the Kremlin and exposed this to be a lie, the Russian government collapsed.

== Cast and characters ==
=== Main ===
- Diane Lane as Jennifer Brown, Yorick and Hero's mother, and a Democratic U.S. Congresswoman who is elevated to the office of President. She was previously the Chair of the House Intelligence Committee.
- Ashley Romans as Sarah Burgin / Agent 355, a member of the secretive Culper Ring organization, Yorick's bodyguard, and a Secret Service agent.
- Ben Schnetzer as Yorick Brown, an amateur escape artist and now the last known cisgender male human left alive; his pet capuchin monkey named Ampersand is the only other surviving male mammal.
- Olivia Thirlby as Hero Brown, Yorick's sister, a paramedic.
- Juliana Canfield as Beth DeVille, Yorick's former girlfriend.
- Elliot Fletcher as Sam Jordan, a trans man and Hero's best friend.
- Marin Ireland as Nora Brady / Victoria, a former press advisor to President Ted Campbell.
- Amber Tamblyn as Kimberly Campbell Cunningham, daughter of deceased President Ted Campbell.
- Diana Bang as Dr. Allison Mann, a Harvard University geneticist.

=== Recurring ===
- Jess Salgueiro as Christine Flores, Chief of Staff to President Brown
- Laura de Carteret as Lisa Murray, a former advisor for the Campbell Administration assisting President Brown
- Yanna McIntosh as General Peggy Reed
- Paris Jefferson as Marla Campbell, wife and former First Lady to the deceased U.S. President Ted Campbell.
- Jennifer Wigmore as Regina Oliver, Secretary of Veterans Affairs and the next in line of succession for U.S. President before Jennifer Brown, who was believed to be dead.
- Missi Pyle as Roxanne, the leader of the Daughters of the Amazon, a misandrist survivalist cult.

=== Guest ===
- Paul Gross as Ted Campbell, the Republican U.S. President who is killed in the global die-off.
- Kristen Gutoskie as Sonia, a former convict living as part of the Marrisville community.
- Sydney Meyer as Nicole, an Amazon member.

== Episodes ==
No.	Title	Directed by	Teleplay by	Original release date
1	"The Day Before"	Louise Friedberg	Eliza Clark	September 13, 2021
Three weeks after the event, Yorick and his pet capuchin monkey Ampersand search for food in an abandoned New York City and leave tagged notes for Beth. The day before the event, male animals begin dying. Yorick, an unemployed magic and escape artist teacher, attends a 12-step meeting with his sister Hero and her trans man boyfriend Sam. He asks Hero for money to propose to his girlfriend Beth. In Oklahoma, Agent 355 infiltrates a domestic terrorist cell and detonates a bomb that kills its members. She is then assigned to protect the President in Washington, D.C., where his assistant Nora Brady works with him. The President meets with Congresswoman Jennifer Brown, Yorick's mother and a figure in the presidential line of succession. Hero, an EMT, has an affair with married Mike. Beth rejects Yorick's proposal and his plan to move to Australia with her. Agent 355 receives a new identity as Sarah Burgin of the Secret Service. Hero discovers Mike lied about telling his wife about their affair and fatally strikes him with a fire extinguisher. The next morning, she finds a dead police officer. In Washington, the President announces a mass-casualty event in Israel before he and the other men in the room die. Nora finds her husband and son dead. Yorick wakes up to find widespread deaths and destruction.
2	"Would the World Be Kind"	Louise Friedberg	Eliza Clark	September 13, 2021
Following the mass die-off, surviving politicians attempt to determine the next President. Jennifer Brown is the only available successor, as Regina Oliver, the director of HUD, is missing in Israel. On Day 8, Agent 355 finds her handler dead in a Culper Ring installation and discovers a note containing a Massachusetts address. As riots erupt in Washington, Jennifer and the remaining officials assess shortages of food, water and power. Agent 355 reveals the Culper Ring to President Brown, who leads the government after rioters overrun the White House. By Day 63, Yorick remains in New York, searching for his pet capuchin monkey, Ampersand, and leaving notes for Beth. The government prepares to evacuate the city because flooding threatens the subway system. Jennifer sends Agent 355 to find her daughter Hero. Hero and Sam live with a group of trans men planning to leave New York. Hero visits a FEMA shelter, where she encounters Mike's widow and reveals that she was having an affair with him but does not admit to his murder. Sam persuades Hero to seek help from her mother, Jennifer. Meanwhile, Yorick enters a flooded subway station to rescue Ampersand but fails; the monkey later returns on his own. Agent 355 finds Yorick in Hero's former apartment and takes him to Washington, detaining the helicopter pilots who have seen him and Ampersand, apparently the only surviving mammals with Y chromosomes.
3	"Neil"	Daisy von Scherler Mayer	Katie Edgerton	September 13, 2021
Nora and Mackenzie are turned away from the home they shared with two other mothers. At the Pentagon, Yorick's presence is discovered by Marla Campbell, but President Jennifer Brown and Agent 355 gaslight her into doubting what she saw. Yorick tells Jennifer that he and Beth are engaged and asks her to find Beth. Jennifer dismisses concerns about preserving sperm banks and scientific research, while Agent 355 warns about the need to keep Yorick's survival secret. She recounts how false reports of male survivors in Russia led to unrest and the collapse of its government. In Israel, Regina Oliver awakens from a coma and declares herself President of the United States, prompting a constitutional crisis. Meanwhile, Nora and Mackenzie leave their home after attempting to bury the bodies of Mackenzie's father and brother. Agent 355 selects Harvard geneticist Allison Mann as the only viable candidate to study Yorick. The political crisis is resolved when the Democrats unite against Regina's claim. Jennifer approves the mission to take Yorick to Mann, and Agent 355 recruits the two detained pilots to assist. Kimberly questions whether Marla could have mistaken Yorick for someone else. To conceal his identity, Yorick is transported out of the Pentagon on a gurney among corpses. During the flight, the helicopter providing air cover explodes, leaving Yorick shaken while Agent 355 remains composed.
4	"Karen and Benji"	Destiny Ekaragha	Donnetta Lavinia Grays	September 20, 2021
Agent 355 sleepwalks while camping with Yorick. On their way to Washington, D.C., Hero and Sam find a working car at a horse barn, but Hero persuades Sam to stay overnight and later sabotages the car. She tells him about her relationship with Mike and her mother's disapproval of the affair. While Sam sleeps, Hero disables the car. They encounter Nora and Mackenzie, and Hero treats Mackenzie's infected wound before inviting them to stay at the ranch house. Meanwhile, Agent 355 prepares to kill two women ransacking their camp, but Yorick's appearance scares them away. They trade a generator and a hand grenade for a motorcycle at a market controlled by police widows. Yorick runs off, is captured and unmasked, revealing that he is a man. Agent 355 rescues him, and they escape under fire after several people see his face. They argue about his recklessness and her methods but reconcile after Yorick performs a card trick. Nora discovers that the ranch house is a domestic violence shelter. When armed women arrive seeking medicine for Kate, who has been shot, Nora negotiates with them using Hero's EMT training. The group is taken to the women's new home in a warehouse store, where their leader Roxanne executes Kate and allows the travelers to stay until Mackenzie recovers.
5	"Mann Hunt"	Mairzee Almas	Tian Jun Gu	September 27, 2021
6	"Weird Al Is Dead"	Destiny Ekaragha	Catya McMullen	October 4, 2021
7	"My Mother Saw a Monkey"	Lauren Wolkstein	Charlie Jane Anders	October 11, 2021
8	"Ready. Aim. Fire."	Karena Evans	Coleman Herbert	October 18, 2021
9	"Peppers"	Cheryl Dunye	Katie Edgerton	October 25, 2021
10	"Victoria"	Daisy von Scherler Mayer	Eliza Clark	November 1, 2021

== Production ==
=== Development ===
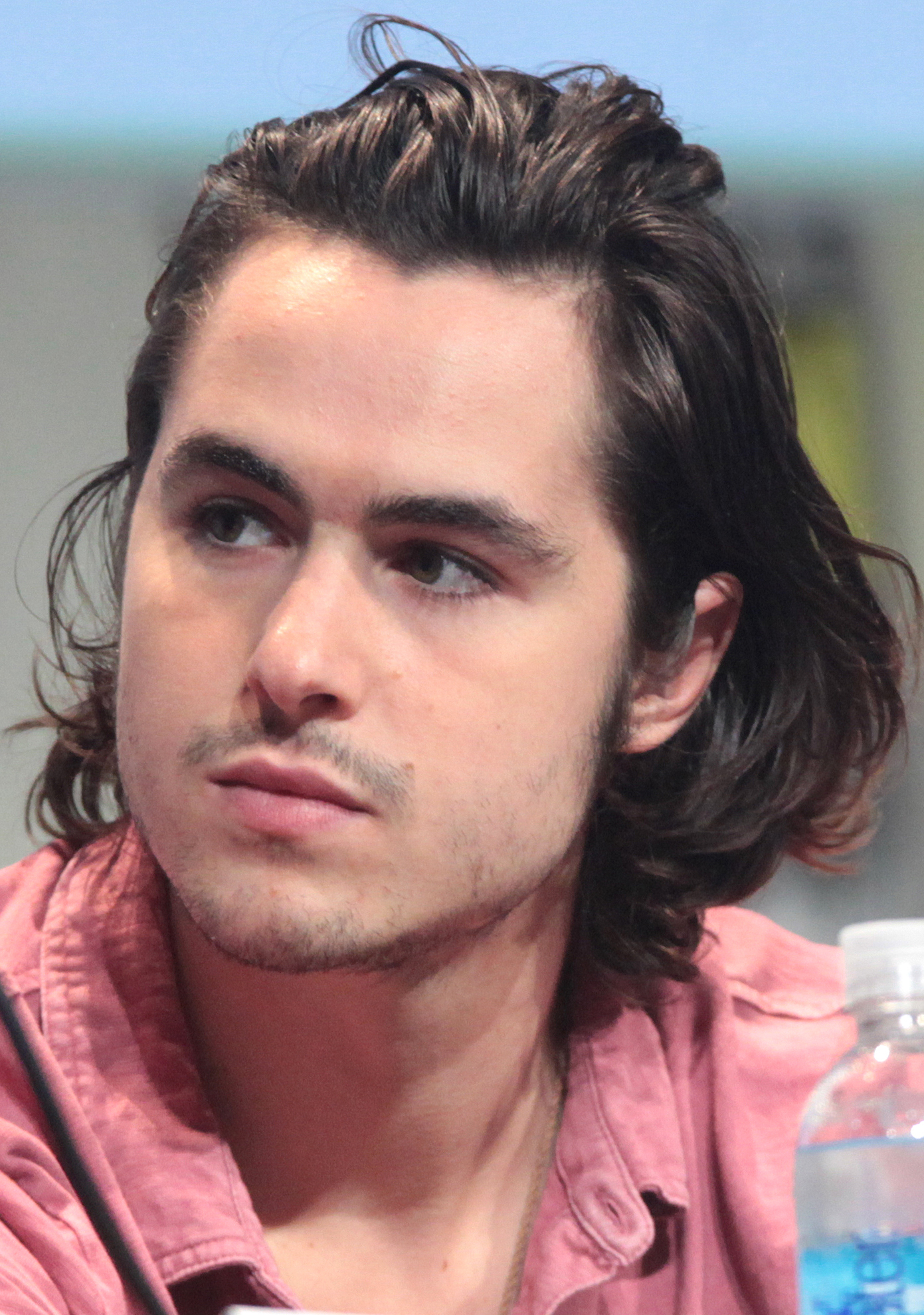
Ben Schnetzer portrays series lead character Yorick Brown

In October 2015, it was reported that FX had begun development on a television series adaptation of Brian K. Vaughan and Pia Guerra's comic book series Y: The Last Man. Vaughan was set to produce alongside Nina Jacobson and Brad Simpson. Production companies involved with the series were expected to include Color Force and FX Productions.

In November 2016, it was announced that Michael Green would serve as showrunner for the potential series in addition to writing a pilot script with Vaughan. In January 2017, it was reported that FX was expecting to receive the script in the next few months. In May 2017, it was clarified that Green had solely written the script and that Vaughan had read and liked it. In July 2017, it was confirmed that FX had received a draft of the script from Green, that they had liked it, and that discussions over the potential series were ongoing. In January 2018, FX CEO John Landgraf commented on the series' status during the annual Television Critics Association winter press tour saying, "[We feel] pretty optimistic, not quite at a final decision point. But we got a script I really like, a draft we really like recently." Landgraf went on to comment that Green was now available for the series following his departure from American Gods.

In April 2018, it was announced that FX had given the production a pilot order. Green was expected to co-showrun the series with Aida Mashaka Croal, both of whom were also set to executive produce alongside Melina Matsoukas, Jacobson, Simpson, and Vaughan. Matsoukas was also slated to direct the pilot episode. In February 2019, it was announced at the Television Critics Association's annual winter press tour that the production had been given a series order for a first season, expected to premiere in 2020.

In April 2019, Green and Croal exited the series, with creative differences cited. In June 2019, it was announced that Eliza Clark would be replacing Croal and Green as the showrunner. In February 2020, it was concluded that Clark, Nina Jacobson and Brad Simpson of Color Force, and Vaughan would executive produce. Matsoukas also serves as executive producer, as does Mari Jo Winkler-Ioffreda. Nellie Reed serves as producer. In May 2020, it was announced that the show's title had been changed from simply Y to Y: The Last Man. In June 2020, it was announced that the series would premiere FX on Hulu instead of FX's linear cable network. In October 2020, it was announced that along with serving as showrunner, Eliza Clark would also be writing the first two episodes, with Louise Friedberg directing those episodes. FX also announced that the entire first season would be directed by women. The series premiered with its first three episodes on September 13, 2021, with subsequent episodes released weekly.

=== Casting ===
In July 2018, it was announced that Diane Lane, Barry Keoghan, Imogen Poots, Lashana Lynch, Juliana Canfield, Marin Ireland, Amber Tamblyn, and Timothy Hutton had been cast in the pilot's main roles. In February 2020, it was announced that Keoghan was no longer portraying Yorick and that a new actor would be cast. Later that month, Ben Schnetzer was cast in the role of Yorick. In March 2020, it was announced that Elliot Fletcher had been cast in the series regular role of Sam Jordan, Hero's best friend. In October 2020, Ashley Romans and Olivia Thirlby joined the cast to replace Lynch and Poots as Agent 355 and Hero Brown, respectively. It was also announced that Hutton was no longer part of the cast list due to series restructuring, and his role would be played by Paul Gross. It was later announced that Diana Bang had been cast as Doctor Allison Mann.

=== Filming ===
Principal photography for the pilot originally commenced in August 2018.

Filming locations reportedly included Pearl River, New York. In February 2020, it was revealed that production for the series was to begin in April. Production was suspended due to the COVID-19 pandemic. Filming for the series began in Mississauga, Ontario, Canada in October 2020, and concluded in July 2021.

=== Cancellation ===
On October 17, 2021, FX on Hulu canceled the series after one season. However, Clark was committed to finding a new outlet or network for the series to continue. Numerous reasons have been provided for the cancellation, including low viewing figures, as well as contractual and budgetary considerations. Due to the showrunner and cast changes as well as the COVID-19 pandemic-related production shutdowns, FX had to pay to extend the contracts for the actors. The contracts were set to expire on October 15, 2021, and FX ultimately decided against spending $3 million to further extend them. In January 2022, Clark revealed that the series was permanently canceled as it failed to find a new network. In February 2022, FX Chairman John Landgraf referred to a "really steep decline" in viewership over the course of the show's run as the reason for its cancellation.

== Reception ==
=== Critical response ===
The review aggregator website Rotten Tomatoes reports a 77% approval rating with an average rating of 6.9/10, based on 60 reviews. The website's critics consensus reads, "Y: The Last Man makes a few key updates to its source material and boasts a number of incredible performances, but this highly anticipated adaptation can't help but feel like a bit of a letdown in a world full of dystopian realities." Metacritic gave the series a weighted average score of 63 out of 100 based on reviews from 26 critics, indicating "generally favorable reviews".

Judy Berman of Time wrote, "Y: The Last Man improves so much over the course of its first six episodes that its potential feels limitless. If audiences can weather its apocalypse, the show might well become something special by the time rebuilding commences." Alan Sepinwall of Rolling Stone gave it 3 out of 5 stars and wrote, "A solid but frustrating show that frequently struggles to embrace what's unique about itself." Darren Franich of Entertainment Weekly gave it a "C" grade and wrote, "there's a basic lack of flair in the storytelling" and "even if you never read the comic book, you've seen this all before." From The Guardian, Joel Golby notes that its "...telling good, human stories against a backdrop of unbelievable sci-fi architecture makes for something utterly gripping" while Lucy Mangan dismissed the series as "a stale, male manbaby mess." Kelly Lawler of USA Today called it a "flawed but vibrant epic" and stated that the show "doesn't quite achieve the mastery and impact of its source material but is certainly a worthy adaptation." Clint Worthington of Consequence considered the series "dated and languid". Caroline Framke of Variety felt that "the real undoing of Y: The Last Man, at least in the first six episodes provided to press ahead of the show's premiere, is that it takes itself too seriously to allow for many other emotions beyond 'desperate' and 'grieving'."

=== Accolades ===
Year	Award	Category	Nominee(s)	Result	Ref.
2022	20th Visual Effects Society Awards	Outstanding Animated Character in an Episode or Real-Time Project	Mike Beaulieu, Michael Dharney, Peter Pi, Aidana Sakhvaliyeva (for "Ampersand")	Nominated	
2022	49th Annie Awards	Outstanding Achievement for Character Animation in a Live Action Production	Industrial Light & Magic Animation Team	Nominated	
2022	33rd GLAAD Media Awards	Outstanding New TV Series	Y: The Last Man	Nominated	
2022	ReFrame Stamp	IMDbPro Top 200 Scripted TV Recipients	Y: The Last Man	Won	

=== Viewership ===
According to market research company Parrot Analytics, which looks at consumer engagement in consumer research, streaming, downloads, and on social media, Y: The Last Man was a key driver of demand for Hulu originals in Austria. There was high Austrian demand for the series in September 2021, which contributed to the overall growth of Hulu's demand share during that month. Whip Media, which tracks viewership data for the more than 18 million worldwide users of its TV Time app, reported that Y: The Last Man was the second most-anticipated new television series of September 2021. It was the ninth most-streamed original television series in the U.S. during the week of September 19, 2021. Parrot Analytics later announced that Y: The Last Man was one of the top-premieres in Q3, ranking among the top 10 with a demand of 16.7 times the average series demand.
