= List of Y: The Last Man story arcs =

This article is a list of story arcs in the Vertigo comic book series Y: The Last Man.

== "Unmanned" (issues #1–5) ==
On July 17, 2002, a mysterious plague kills every male mammal on earth except for Yorick and his monkey Ampersand. Two months later, Yorick arrives in Washington, D.C. and finds his mother, Representative Brown. After dealing with a rogue group of gun-toting Republican widows, the new President assigns Agent 355 to escort Yorick to Boston, the last known location of the geneticist Dr. Mann. They hope that Mann can study Yorick, discover the reasons behind Yorick's survival, and help repopulate the world. Three days later, Alter Tse'elon, the new chief of the general staff for Israel, is informed of Yorick's existence. Israeli soldiers destroy Dr. Mann's lab, forcing her, 355, and Yorick to travel to San Francisco, California, to her backup lab. All the while, Yorick is more concerned with finding his girlfriend Beth, who is conducting research in Australia, to whom he proposed over the phone the instant the plague hit.

== "Cycles" (issues #6–10) ==
The three main characters, Yorick, 355, and Dr. Mann, hop a train and find themselves in a strangely idyllic town in rural Marrisville, Ohio, run by ex-convicts. After a brief rest, Yorick meets and is instantly attracted to Sonia, a convicted drug dealer. The Daughters of the Amazon, including Yorick's older sister Hero, track Yorick to Marrisville and threaten to destroy the town if they can't kill the last man alive. In the end, their leader, Victoria, dies at the hands of Sonia before she can kill Yorick. Hero kills Sonia. Yorick asks the townspeople to lock up the Daughters of the Amazon.

== "One Small Step" (issues #11–15) ==
In Oldenbrook, Kansas, Yorick, 355, and Dr. Mann help a Russian woman named Natalya Zamyatin recover two male and one female astronauts forced to return to Earth after being trapped on the International Space Station the day the plague hit. The four meet twins Heather and Heidi, who are geneticists working in isolation. After Alter Tse'elon acquires Yorick for her nation, 355 tells Alter of the two men coming down in exchange for Yorick. Alter tries to use a surface-to-air missile to kill the astronauts, but is stopped by Yorick. Both male astronauts die, but a pregnant Dr. Ciba Weber survives. The three go back on the road, leaving Natalya and the Twins to look after Weber and her unborn baby.

== "Comedy & Tragedy" (issues #16–17) ==
A traveling group of actresses finds a wayward Ampersand, inspiring them to write a play called The Last Man (The main character's name taken from Mary Shelley's novel The Last Man). On the night of the premiere, the play is interrupted by the local women (who find the play to be offensive) and a disguised Yorick, accompanied by a similarly masked 355 and Dr. Mann, looking for Ampersand. Yorick discovers that the play ends with the eponymous man killing himself to end the fighting over him, contributing to his growing depression.

== "Safeword" (issues #18–20) ==
Yorick and his companions travel to Allenspark, Colorado, where 355 and Dr. Mann fix up Ampersand, while retired Culper Ring agent 711 forces Yorick to confront his survivor's guilt.

== "Widow's Pass" (issues #21–23) ==
The story moves to Queensbrook, set eight months after the One Small Step arc. Eight well-armed women from Arizona block the interstate, making travel to Dr. Mann's lab in California nearly impossible. In Oldenbrook, Kansas, Ciba gives birth to a boy, who is kept in the hot suite until geneticists can confirm there is no remaining trace of the plague in the air.

== "Tongues of Flame" (issues #24–25) ==
Yorick and company finally reach California. Yorick briefly leaves a sleeping Dr. Mann and 355 behind to examine a nearby church. There, he meets a second girl named Beth, to whom he describes the events of "Widow's Pass". After a sexual encounter, they are threatened by Amazons, whom Yorick scares off using parlor tricks. Yorick then leaves Beth to continue his journey to San Francisco.

== "Hero's Journey" (issue #26) ==
The backstory of Yorick's sister Hero is revealed, including the day the Plague hits, how she becomes a member of the Amazons, what happens after "Cycles", and how she has tracked down Yorick to the hot suite, to discover the recently born boy, thinking about how to kill him.

== "Ring of Truth" (issues #27–31) ==
After two years roaming the country, Yorick reaches San Francisco. Dr. Mann discovers the apparent answer to how Yorick and Ampersand survived the Plague (Note that this was not confirmed as definitively true. It is simply Dr. Mann's own conclusion). Yorick's sister, Hero, tracks him to San Francisco. A new adversary swoops in and steals a major key to the cure.

== "Girl on Girl" (issues #32–35) ==
Yorick and company begin a new quest to retrieve the stolen Ampersand. They join a ragtag band of female sailors on a voyage to Australia aboard an old cruise ship named "The Whale". Yorick falls for the ship's captain, and the relationship between Dr. Mann and 355 takes a new turn. Alter Tse'elon, former Chief of General Staff of the IDF, manages to escape court-martial by shooting the judge.

== "Boy Loses Girl" (issue #36) ==
This is the backstory of how Beth Deville met and fell in love with Yorick, and her life before and after the Plague hit. In the end, Beth has a cryptic dream that convinces her that Yorick is alive.

== "Paper Dolls" (issues #37–39) ==
Yorick is caught by a reporter while looking for his girlfriend in Australia. He finds out that Beth left for Paris. Alter Tse'elon shoots and kills Yorick's mother.

== "The Hour of our Death" (issue #40) ==
This shows how Hero delivers a letter from Yorick to Beth II (from "Tongues of Flame"), who is eight months pregnant with Yorick's child. The two women go on the road together back to Kansas.

== "Buttons" (issue #41) ==
This tells the origin of Agent 355, Yorick's loyal protector. This is a stand-alone issue in which the secrets of the mysterious Culper Ring and its most famous female agent are finally revealed.

== "1,000 Typewriters" (issue #42) ==
This explores the past, present, and future of Ampersand, Yorick's missing pet. It includes how the male monkey ended up with Yorick, and where the animal has been since he was kidnapped by the female ninja Toyota.

== "Kimono Dragons" (issues #43–46) ==
Yorick and his companions finally reach Japan in search of Ampersand, the key to mankind's salvation. Dr. Allison Mann and her lover, Rose, come face to face with Toyota, who, before the plague, worked for Dr. Mann's father's lover. Yorick and Agent 355 find and rescue Ampersand with the help of a P.I. from the hands of the new Yakuza boss. Allison's mother is kidnapped by Toyota.

== "The Tin Man" (issue #47) ==
This tells the "secret origin" of Dr. Allison Mann and her quest to clone herself.

== "Gehenna" (issue #48) ==
This is the life story of Alter Tse'elon.

== "Motherland" (issues #49–52) ==
Yorick is confronted by Dr. Mann's father. He believes that mankind outgrew a need for men after the first successful cloning of a human being. He sets out to kill Yorick and himself in an attempt to finish what nature started. 355 and Toyota battle to the death, and the fate of the Australian spy is determined. Many people involved with Yorick's group begin to converge in Paris, as he and 355 separate from Dr. Mann and continue to search for Yorick's fiancée, Beth.

== "The Obituarist" (issue #53) ==
This follows the body collector from issue #2, Waverly, as she develops a relationship with a cross-dressing prostitute named Bobbi and is called to lay Jennifer Brown's body to rest.

== "Tragicomic" (issue #54) ==
The Fish & Bicycle Troupe has turned to filmmaking in an attempt to reach more people than they could by touring their stage production. When that effort fails, Cayce realizes that there's one very popular, cheap to produce method of communication they haven't tried...comic books!

== "Whys and Wherefores" (issues #55–59) ==
Yorick and Agent 355 race toward Paris to find Beth, while the group of women protecting the daughter Yorick never even knew he sired continues to flee the Israeli soldiers led by Alter. Yorick finds Beth, and they make love, but then she confesses that she was about to dump him pre-Plague before seeing how he changed and what he did to find her. 355 sells her gun for a dress and doesn't seem to see Alter's spy following her. Yorick leaves to get some air, and while he is gone, Second Beth and Beth, Jr., with Hero, meet First Beth.

Alter's group captures the three Beths and Hero. Yorick goes to 355 and admits that the only reason he went on living the past few years was because he loved her and was the only person he wanted to be with. He even admits seeing her in an Aphrodite-like pose when 711 nearly drowned him. They decide to give a shot to their relationship, but just as 355 whispers her real name into Yorick's ear, she is shot dead by Alter, leaving Yorick completely devastated.

Hero and the Beths are rescued by Ciba Weber and Natalya. Yorick fights with Alter, who claims that 355's group, the Culper Ring, was responsible for the deaths of all the other men. She says they created a chemical agent designed to prevent women from conceiving male children and introduced it in China, which they thought was a threat. However, something went wrong, and the chemical agent instead killed males of all ages. Yorick doesn't believe her and realizes that Alter wants to die and has been trying to get him, the last man, to kill her. He refuses to do so and gives her to her troops, who leave Paris. In the end, Hero and the Beths are reunited with a devastated Yorick and find out about 355's death.

== "Alas" (issue #60) ==
Set sixty years after issue #59, the final issue shows an elderly Yorick reflecting on scenes from his past that are missing. Yorick the 17th, a 22-year-old clone of Yorick, visits him in an asylum in Paris, France. The real Yorick has been committed to an asylum after apparently trying to kill himself (though Yorick himself claims that he is the victim of his own misconstrued joke) by his daughter Beth Jr., who is now the president of France. It is also revealed that he married her mother, Beth II. He reflects on his visits to Hero (now in a relationship with Beth), Dr. Mann (who died before he had a chance to tell her goodbye), and to the final resting place of 355, where he ends an aging Ampersand's suffering. After reminiscing with his clone, the original Yorick distracts him and escapes from the cell through a second-story window, freeing himself from his straitjacket. As he escapes, a last flashback shows Yorick getting a wound cleaned by Dr. Mann and is then reunited with 355 for the last time. After his escape, nobody can be seen below the window. And the final panel shows the straitjacket soaring in the air, its sleeves flying to make a Y-shape with a single word on the page, "Alas". Throughout his reminiscing it was obvious that the real Yorick was unhappy, as he lost 355 (whom he apparently considered to be the love of his life), Dr. Mann, and Ampersand, and the fact that his daughter, Beth Jr., had him institutionalized reflecting the title of this issue: the name "Alas" is a reference to the "Alas, poor Yorick" speech from Hamlet, for whom the protagonist character was named.
