= Pia Guerra =

American-born Canadian comic book artist and editorial cartoonist

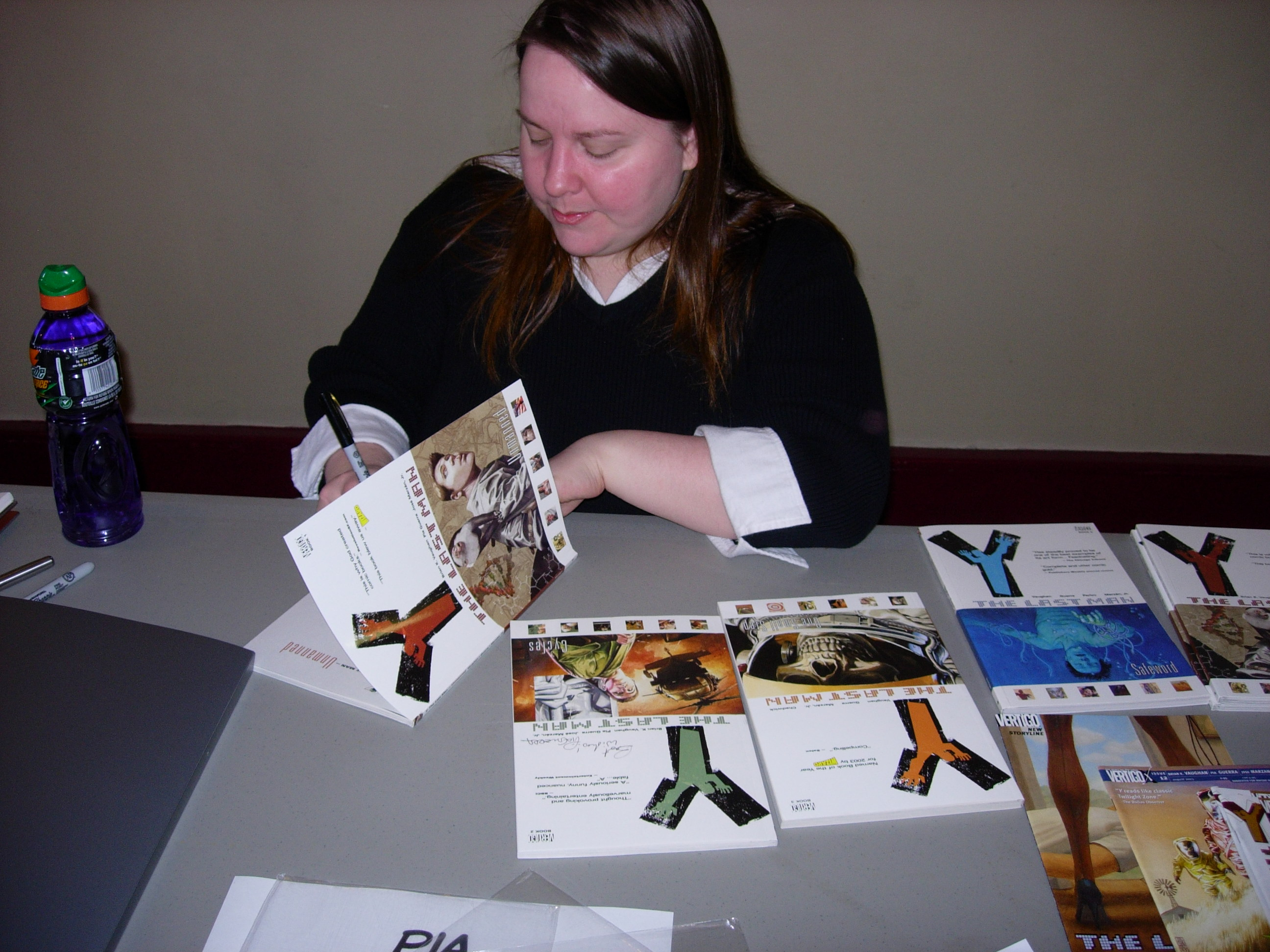
- Pia Guerra at the Vancouver Comicon, March 2006
- Born: Pia Jasmin Guerra Hoboken, New Jersey, U.S.
- Areas: Artist, pencils
- Notable works: Y: The Last Man series
- Awards: Eisner Award, Harvey Award, Joe Shuster Award

Pia Jasmin Guerra is an American-born Canadian comic book artist and editorial cartoonist, best known for her work as co-creator and lead penciller on the Vertigo title Y: The Last Man. She has worked in the comics industry since the 1990s, and has also contributed to Doctor Who: The Forgotten, along with DC and Marvel comics. Guerra regularly does cartoons for The New Yorker, MAD Magazine and The Nib. She is the author of the Image Comics editorial cartoon book, Me The People.

== Early life ==
Guerra was born in Hoboken, New Jersey, to a Finnish mother and Chilean father. At the age of 10, Guerra's cousin visited from Queens and introduced her to comics by leaving his issue of The Uncanny X-Men #129 on a coffee table in her house. After reading the comic, Guerra continued to read comics thereafter. As a self-taught artist, Guerra was always interested in art, but she planned to pursue other careers, such as medicine.

In high school, Guerra attended comic conventions and began to consider pursuing a career in comics. As her plans shifted, Guerra made the decision to forgo secondary education and instead focus on pursuing a career in comics.

== Career ==
During her early career, Guerra did voice over work and worked on many different video games and video game manuals. In 1998, Guerra created storyboards for Boeing Employee's Credit Union and Microsoft Studios. Before creating Y: The Last Man, Guerra contacted Brian K. Vaughan, and they arranged to meet in San Diego.

Guerra's first major project was the Vertigo title Y: The Last Man, which she co-created with Brian Vaughan and pencilled for. Guerra has worked on various independent titles since the mid-1990s, though Y: The Last Man is known as her "big break" in the comics industry.

In 2005, Guerra worked as a penciller on Marvel's Spider-Man: Unlimited. In the late 2000s, Guerra contributed to a Doctor Who comic entitled Doctor Who: The Forgotten (published by IDW Publishing and written by UK writer Tony Lee), and to a Torchwood series (for Torchwood Magazine) written by Gareth David-Lloyd. She has co-written two issues of Simpsons Comics for Bongo Comics with Ian Boothby.

From 2013 to 2015, she worked on five comic book covers, including a variant cover for Black Canary.

In the late 2010s, Guerra turned to editorial cartooning. She has done cartoons for the online page The Nib, The Washington Post and The New Yorker. Following the February 2018 mass shooting at Marjory Stoneman Douglas High School in Parkland, Florida, she posted a widely shared cartoon on Twitter depicting school staffer Aaron Feis, who had died protecting students, being led in the afterlife to a hero's welcome from those who had been killed. Guerra told The Washington Post that the cartoon was a direct response to her feelings of helplessness in the face of yet another mass shooting.

In April 2022, Guerra was reported among the contributors to Operation USA's benefit anthology book, Comics for Ukraine: Sunflower Seeds, a project spearheaded by IDW Publishing Special Projects Editor Scott Dunbier, whose profits would be donated to relief efforts for Ukrainian refugees resulting from the February 2022 Russian invasion of Ukraine.

Guerra was a Pulitzer Prize finalist in the category Illustrated Reporting and Commentary in 2023.

== Personal life ==
Guerra currently resides in Vancouver, Canada, and is married to writer and comedian Ian Boothby, with whom she does cartoons for Go Comics, Instagram, The Washington Post and the New Yorker. Since February 2021, they have collaborated on the daily, one panel comic Mannequin on the Moon.

== Bibliography ==
- Card Illustrator: Rage (White Wolf and Wizards of the Coast, 1998)
- Card Illustrator: Legend of the Five Rings (Paul Allen, Wizards of the Coast, Timm, 2000)
- Co-creator and Penciller:Y: The Last Man (with Brian K. Vaughan, Vertigo, 2002–2008)
- Penciller: Heroes Anonymous #2 (Scott M. Gimple, Bongo Comics, 2003)
- Penciller: Spider-man Unlimited #10 (Maria-Emiko Macuaga and Marc Sumerak, Marvel, 2005)
- Co-writer and Penciller: Bart Simpson's Treehouse of Horror #13 (with Ian Boothby, Bongo Comics, 2007)
- Penciller and Inker: Doctor Who: The Forgotten (Tony Lee, IDW Publishing, 2008–)
- Cover artist: Elephantmen #64 (Richard Starkings, Image Comics, 2015)
- Artist: Black Canary #4 (Brenden Fletcher, DC Comics, 2015)
- Contributor: La BD Est Charlie (Glénat Editions, 2015)

== Awards ==
- 2006 Joe Shuster Award: Outstanding Comic Book Artist
- 2008 Eisner Award: Best Penciller/Inker or Penciller/Inker Team (with inker José Marzán, Jr., for Y: The Last Man)

=== Nominations ===
- 2003 Harvey Award: Best New Series (with Brian K. Vaughan and José Marzán, Jr., for Y: The Last Man)
- 2005 Prix Du Scenario Award from the Angoulême International Comics Festival: Best Script (with Brian K. Vaughan for Y: The Last Man)
- 2008 Spike TV's Scream Award: Best Comic Book Artist
- 2009 Hugo Award: Best Graphic Story (with Brian K. Vaughan and José Marzán, Jr., for Y: The Last Man; Volume 10: Whys and Wherefores)
