= José Marzan Jr. =

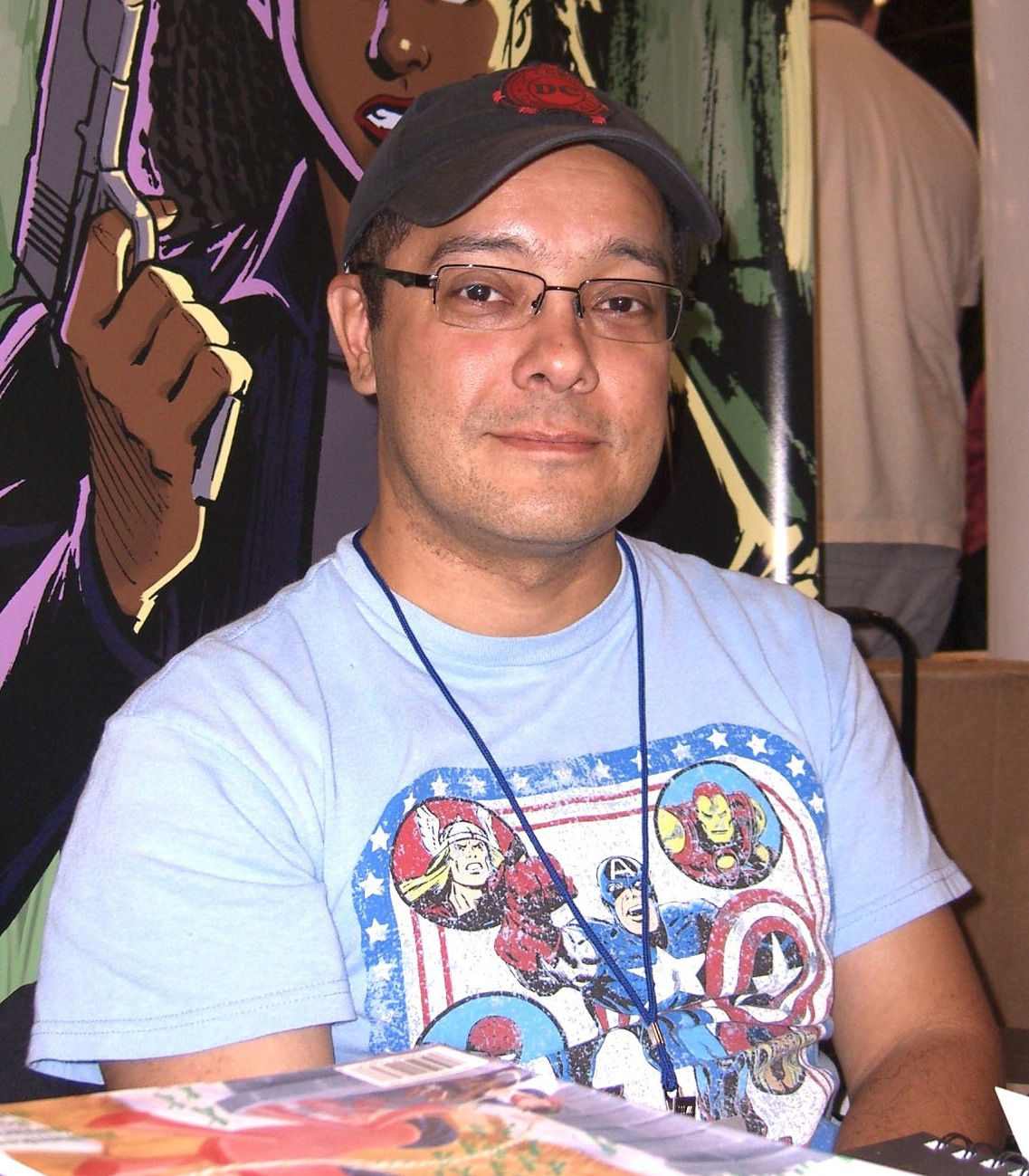
- Marzan at the New York Comic Con in Manhattan, October 10, 2010
- Areas: Penciller, Inker

José Marzán Jr. is an American comic book writer and artist. Over his career he has worked on many titles including Action Comics, Final Night, Marvel Comics Presents, Nightwing and Y: The Last Man.

He was the regular inker on The Flash for over nine years, from issues 38 (May 1990) to #151 (August, 1999), through many penciler changes.
