= Y: The Last Man =

Comic book series

- Cover page of Y: The Last Man #1 by J. G. Jones.

Publication information
- Publisher: Vertigo (2002-2008); DC Black Label
- Schedule: Monthly (issues 1–55); Bimonthly (issues 56–60)
- Format: Ongoing series
- Genre: Post-apocalyptic; Science fiction
- Publication date: September 2002 – March 2008
- Main characters: Yorick Brown; Agent 355; Dr. Allison Mann; Ampersand

Creative team
- Written by: Brian K. Vaughan
- Pencillers: Pia Guerra; Goran Sudžuka; Paul Chadwick
- Inker: Jose Marzan Jr.

Collected editions
- Unmanned: ISBN 1-56389-980-9
- Cycles: ISBN 1-4012-0076-1
- One Small Step: ISBN 1-4012-0201-2
- Safeword: ISBN 1-4012-0232-2
- Ring of Truth: ISBN 1-4012-0487-2
- Girl on Girl: ISBN 1-4012-0501-1
- Paper Dolls: ISBN 1-4012-1009-0
- Kimono Dragons: ISBN 1-4012-1010-4
- Motherland: ISBN 1-4012-1351-0
- Whys and Wherefores: ISBN 1-4012-1813-X

Y: The Last Man is a post-apocalyptic science fiction comic book series by Brian K. Vaughan and Pia Guerra published by Vertigo from 2002 through 2008. The series centers on Yorick Brown and his pet capuchin monkey Ampersand, the only males who survived the apparent global die-off. The series was published in sixty issues by Vertigo and collected in a series of ten paperback volumes and later a series of five hardcover "Deluxe" volumes. The series' covers were primarily by J. G. Jones and Massimo Carnevale. The series received three Eisner Awards.

A ten-episode television series adaptation of the first volume aired on FX on Hulu from September 13 to November 1, 2021.

== Plot summary ==
On July 17, 2002, all living mammals with a Y chromosome—including embryos and sperm—simultaneously die, with the exception of a young amateur escape artist named Yorick Brown and his capuchin monkey, Ampersand. Many women die as a secondary effect of male deaths, such as plane crashes. Society is plunged into chaos as infrastructures collapse, and the surviving women everywhere try to cope with the loss of men, and the belief that, barring a rapid, major scientific breakthrough or other extraordinary event, humanity is doomed to extinction.

Yorick's mother, a member of the U.S. House of Representatives, commissions Agent 355 of the secret Culper Ring organization to protect Yorick. The two travel to meet geneticist and cloning expert Dr. Allison Mann, who works to discover why Yorick survived and find a way to save humankind. Due to damage at Mann's laboratory in Boston, the trio first travel across the country to Mann's other lab in San Francisco, then to Australia and Japan.

During the trip, the group is chased by multiple parties who know of Yorick's existence and want to capture or kill him for their own purposes, including an Israeli army commando named Alter, the militant Daughters of the Amazon, and a ninja. They are aided by Yorick's sister, Hero, a Russian soldier named Natalya, an astronaut named Ciba, a former flight attendant named Beth who becomes pregnant after a one-night stand with Yorick, and Rose, an Australian sailor.

In China, the group learns Mann's father, Dr. Matsumori, is also still alive and has created many clones of Allison Mann. He reveals to Yorick that Ampersand had been one of his lab animals he was experimenting on. He believes Ampersand had been inadvertently shielded by what killed off other Y-chromosome lifeforms as a result of one of his experiments and that this protection was transferred to Yorick via pathogens. He also reveals that Ampersand ended up in Yorick's care by accident. When Mann learns that Matsumori plans to murder Yorick before committing suicide, she kills him. Armed with the samples and information she needs, Mann stays in China to work on cloning.

Yorick and Agent 355 journey to Paris, France, where Yorick is reunited with his ex-girlfriend, whom he wanted to marry before the die-off. After initially celebrating their reconnection, Yorick realizes he actually loves 355. After meeting up with 355, Yorick tells her how he feels and she reveals she feels the same for him. Agent 355 is killed shortly thereafter by Alter, using a sniper rifle. When Alter attempts to capture Yorick, he defeats her and says he believes her dedicated pursuit of him was actually a roundabout way of suicide. He lets her live, and she is remanded into the custody of the Israelis. Yorick and Beth soon become a couple and raise their daughter together.

Decades later, Dr. Mann has succeeded in cloning Yorick seventeen times, along with thousands of copies of a small number of deceased males. Most of the world enjoys peace and prosperity as economic and technological development has resumed. Yorick and Beth's daughter is President of France. Yorick is institutionalized after making a joke interpreted as a suicide attempt. He is visited by one of his clones, who is the same age he was during the die-off event. After imparting advice to his clone, Yorick escapes.

== Main characters ==
- Yorick Brown, a young amateur escape artist who is believed to be the last human male on Earth.
- Agent 355, Yorick's bodyguard who works for the Culper Ring, a mysterious U.S. government agency dating back to the American Revolution.
- Doctor Allison Mann, an expert geneticist seeking to discover the cause of the plague and why Yorick survived.
- Ampersand, Yorick's capuchin monkey and the only other male mammal to survive the plague.
- Beth Deville, Yorick's girlfriend. When the plague hit, she was engaged in anthropological work in Australia.
- Beth 2, Yorick's one night stand and mother of his daughter.
- Hero Brown, Yorick's older sister, who joined the Daughters of the Amazon after the plague.
- Natalya Zamyatin, a Russian soldier who helps Yorick, Agent 355 and Allison Mann.
- Ciba Weber, an astronaut who is saved by Agent 355 and Allison Mann from a burning Soyuz capsule.
- Rose Copen, a spy and demolitions expert for the Australian Navy, and Allison Mann's lover.
- Alter Tse'elon, the new chief of the general staff for Israel.

== The plague ==
The source of the plague that wiped out every living mammal with a Y chromosome except Yorick Brown, Ampersand, and Doctor Matsumori is never fully explained. A number of possible explanations are provided throughout the course of the series, but a definitive answer is left for the reader to decide. Discussing the cause of the plague, Vaughan is quoted as saying:

I feel that there is a definitive explanation, but I like that people don't necessarily know what it is. In interviews we always said that we would tell people exactly what caused the plague. The thing was, we never said when we were going to tell. We weren't going to tell you when we were telling you, I should say. We might have told you in issue #3. There might have been something in the background that only a couple people caught. It might have been Dr. Mann's father's very detailed, scientific explanation. It might have been Alter's off-the-wall conspiracy theory. The real answer is somewhere in those 60 issues, but I prefer to let the reader decide which one they like rather than pushing it on them.

=== Explanations ===
Three explanations are considered by the protagonists:

- Failed clandestine attack on China (propagated by Lt. General Alter): The Culper Ring created a chemical agent designed to prevent women from conceiving male children. This agent was introduced into China to cripple their economy; something went wrong, and the chemical agent instead killed males of all ages.
  - This is stated as the definitive cause of the plague in Brian K. Vaughan's abridged script for Y: The Last Man, penned two years after the completion of the comic book series.
- Dr. Matsumori's theory: viable cloning made males unnecessary, and thus mother nature destroyed them – The Y-chromosome had been "rationally self-destructing for hundreds of millions of years" and thus the birth of Dr. Matsumori's first successful human clone "triggered a time-bomb that had been ticking for millennia." In other words, the moment the Y-chromosome became obsolete "nature righted its course."
  - Matsumori had also discovered a "chemical compound that had an adverse effect on the genome of cloned mammals" which he injected into a capuchin monkey (Ampersand) in an attempt to kill his daughter's unborn clone fetus. Yet, as fate would have it, Ampersand was misdelivered to Yorick and when the plague struck, the compound ended up having the opposite effect on non-cloned mammals, shielding all three of them from "God's wrath."
- Cursed amulet (propagated by ancient mysticism and the Setauket Ring): the plague struck the moment Agent 355 removed the sacred Amulet of Helene from the nation of Jordan. The amulet carried a warning that if it was ever taken from its homeland, it would create a tragedy greater than the Trojan War. It is also suggested that the wedding ring Yorick bought for Beth may have protected him and Ampersand from the effect of this curse.
  - This was the first theory for the plague's cause presented in the series, with Agent 355 being warned about the amulet's curse in the opening pages.
  - Yorick's ring was a similarly supposedly mystical Middle Eastern relic, alleged to muddle the bearer's gender in order to give a married man an aspect of his wife's femininity, and vice versa.

Other explanations put forth in the book include:

- The Earth cleansing herself of the Y chromosome, as believed by the Amazons.
- The Rapture taking all men and leaving women as a punishment for original sin, as believed by an air traffic controller.
- The remaining (female) members of Sons of Arizona were convinced that the government was responsible for the plague, and the top government leaders were lying in wait to take over the country.
- Changes in the Dreamtime affecting normal reality, as believed by some Aboriginal Australians and Beth.
- One member of the "Fish & Bicycle" traveling theater troupe advanced the theory the plague was a direct response to the exclusion of women from true parity in the performing arts, thereby upsetting the natural order. In support of this theory, it was speculated the total exclusion of women from the stage in William Shakespeare's day had resulted in pandemic outbreaks of the Bubonic plague.

== In other media ==
=== Cancelled film adaptation ===
The film rights to the series were acquired by New Line Cinema (a sister company to Vertigo), and in July 2007 screenwriter Carl Ellsworth and director D. J. Caruso were attached to the project with David S. Goyer as a producer.

Caruso intended on finishing the script in the summer and filming during the fall of 2008. The script would be a rewrite of the original draft written by Jeff Vintar. Although Vintar's draft was faithful to the original comic book, the higher-ups at New Line Cinema seemed unable to fully embrace the material. A subsequent draft by Vaughan himself, which departed from his own comic considerably, was also unsuccessful in convincing the studio to proceed.

Caruso maintained that the source material was too much to be told in one film and his team decided to concentrate on the best first film they could, which would end somewhere around issue 14 of the comic series. The entire comic series as a whole would be plotted into three films. Actor Shia LaBeouf, who worked with the writers on the films Disturbia and Eagle Eye, was considered to play the role of Yorick, but the actor considered the role too similar to the character Sam Witwicky, which he portrayed in the Transformers series. Caruso planned to use a real monkey, and not a CGI construct, to play Ampersand. Caruso also said he would like to have Alicia Keys for the part of Agent 355. Zachary Levi, who played the lead in the TV series Chuck, expressed interest in playing Yorick as he is a fan of the comic book series, even going as far as having his character Chuck Bartowski read the Y: The Last Man graphic novel in the episode "Chuck Versus the Nacho Sampler".

Caruso remained "loosely attached" to the project, but New Line refused to acquiesce on its development as a stand-alone movie as opposed to the trilogy Caruso preferred. Caruso, maintaining "I didn't think that you could take Yorick's story and put it in to a two-hour movie and do it justice ... I just feel like it's too much for one screenplay", ultimately walked away from the project.

In March 2012, former Jericho writers Matthew Federman and Stephen Scaia entered final negotiations to write New Line's adaptation of the series, following in the footsteps of Vintar, Vaughan, and Ellsworth. J.C. Spink, Chris Bender and David S. Goyer were attached to produce; Mason Novick and Jake Weiner were named executive producers. Reports in September 2012 suggested New Line was enthusiastic about the draft screenplay produced by Federman and Scaia, and had begun meeting potential directors to hire for the project.

In January 2013, it was announced that Dan Trachtenberg would direct the film. In June 2013, producer David S. Goyer announced having "a script that's as close as it's ever been," and suggested the film could go into production in 2014. However, in January 2014, Brian K. Vaughan stated, "It's my understanding that the rights to Y: The Last Man will revert to co-creator Pia Guerra and me for the first time in a decade if the planned New Line adaptation doesn't start shooting in the next few months." On September 24, Trachtenberg confirmed via Twitter the film was "Not happening. But it's in trusted hands (the creators)." In a subsequent interview he noted that in fact, "The rights reverted back to Brian quite a few months ago."

=== Portuguese adaptation ===
In 2011, a loose adaptation of the graphic novel was made in Portugal by Luís Lobo and Bruno Telésforo as an independent short feature and school film produced by Universidade Lusófona, which was premiered in the Fantasporto film festival on contest.

=== Television adaptation ===
In November 2010 French director Louis Leterrier expressed interest in adapting the series for television. In October 2015, The Hollywood Reporter reported that FX was developing a TV series of Y: The Last Man produced by Nina Jacobson and Brad Simpson alongside Brian K. Vaughan, who would also be a writer for the show. In an interview with Vulture in July 2016, Vaughan commented the FX series was, "very slowly coming to life. No news I can share, other than that it's all chugging along happily." In November 2016, it was reported that Michael Green would be the showrunner for Y: The Last Man.

On April 5, 2018, FX announced it had handed out a formal pilot order and enlisted Aida Mashaka Croal to serve as co-showrunner alongside Green, with Melina Matsoukas as director. On July 11, 2018, FX confirmed the cast list for the lead characters in the TV pilot (titled "Y"), with Barry Keoghan as Yorick Brown, Diane Lane as Yorick's mother Senator Jennifer Brown, Olivia Thirlby as Yorick's sister Hero Brown, and Lashana Lynch as Agent 355. Production commenced on August 20, 2018, and was ordered to series on February 4, 2019.

In April 2019, Green and Croal exited the series due to creative differences. In June 2019, it was announced that Eliza Clark would be replacing Croal and Green as the showrunner. In February 2020, it was reported that Barry Keoghan had exited the role of Yorrick and the character was being recast. Later that month, it was announced that Ben Schnetzer had been cast in the role of Yorick. The role of Agent 355 was also recast, with Ashley Romans replacing Lashana Lynch. The series premiered on September 13, 2021 on FX on Hulu. In October 2021, the series was canceled after one season, with FX citing financial disagreements over requests to extend the cast's contract by $3 million on renewal.

== Reception ==
The comic series attracted wide-spread acclaim during its publication with Comic Book Resources praising it as "a series that transcends the normal restrictions of most comic books" and Publishers Weekly claiming that it was "entirely convincing—and addictive." The Atlantic called it "this wonderful, affecting, intelligent, humane story." Dan Phillips of IGN felt that "the conclusion of Y: The Last Man is as close to a perfect ending as you're likely to see anywhere in the history of comics."

Later reception was more mixed, with SyFy Wire writing that "the premise and execution are lazy, problematic" and "someone's best imitation of what they think a feminist plot would be" and Screen Rant criticizing the series' "problematic treatment of trans men" and unintentional implication that "gender identity is a matter of choice."

The series currently holds a rating of 7.8 on ComicBookRoundup.

== Collected editions ==
Vol	Title	Contents	Pages	Format	Release	ISBN
Trade Paperbacks
1	Unmanned	Y: The Last Man #1–5	128	TPB	Jan 2003	978-1563899805
2	Cycles	Y: The Last Man #6–10	128	TPB	Sep 2003	978-1401200763
3	One Small Step	Y: The Last Man #11–17	168	TPB	May 2004	978-1401236199
4	Safeword	Y: The Last Man #18-23	144	TPB	May 2004	978-1401202323
5	Ring Of Truth	Y: The Last Man #24-31	192	TPB	Aug 2005	978-1401204877
6	Girl On Girl	Y: The Last Man #32-36	128	TPB	23 Nov 2005	978-1401205010
7	Paper Dolls	Y: The Last Man #37-42	144	TPB	May 2006	978-1401210090
8	Kimono Dragons	Y: The Last Man #43-48	144	TPB	22 Nov 2006	978-1401210106
9	Motherland	Y: The Last Man #49-54	144	TPB	9 May 2007	978-1401213510
10	Whys And Wherefores	Y: The Last Man #55-60	168	TPB	18 Jun 2008	978-1401218133
Compact Editions
1	Unmanned	Y: The Last Man #1–10	248	Digest	21 Oct 2025	978-1799502890
Compendiums
1	Compendium One	Y: The Last Man #1–31	728	TPB	10 Nov 2020	978-1779504531
1	Compendium One	Y: The Last Man #1–31	728	TPB	2 Nov 2021	TV tie-in cover: 978-1779516145
2	Compendium Two	Y: The Last Man #32–60	704	TPB	31 Jan 2022	978-1779516084
Deluxe Editions
1	Book One	Y: The Last Man #1-10	256	HC	28 Oct 2008	978-1401219215
1	Book One	Y: The Last Man #1-10	256	TPB	16 Sep 2014	978-1401251512
2	Book Two	Y: The Last Man #11-23	320	HC	12 May 2009	978-1401222352
2	Book Two	Y: The Last Man #11-23	320	TPB	10 Mar 2015	978-1401254391
3	Book Three	Y: The Last Man #24-36	320	HC	27 Apr 2010	978-1401225780
3	Book Three	Y: The Last Man #24-36	320	TPB	29 Sep 2015	978-1401258801
4	Book Four	Y: The Last Man #37-48	296	HC	26 Oct 2010	978-1401228880
4	Book Four	Y: The Last Man #37-48	296	TPB	16 Feb 2016	978-1401261689
5	Book Five	Y: The Last Man #49-60	320	HC	3 May 2011	978-1401230517
5	Book Five	Y: The Last Man #49-60	320	TPB	16 Aug 2016	978-1401263720
Absolute Editions
1	Volume 1	Y: The Last Man #1-20	512	Slipcase HC	7 Jul 2015	978-1401254292
2	Volume 2	Y: The Last Man #21-40	512	Slipcase HC	20 Sep 2016	978-1401264918
3	Volume 3	Y: The Last Man #41-60	544	Slipcase HC	4 Jul 2017	978-1401271008

== Awards and honors ==
Y: The Last Man won the 2003 National Comics Award for Best New Comic.

In 2008, Y: The Last Man won the Eisner Award for Best Continuing Series.

In 2009, Y: The Last Man, Volume 10: Whys and Wherefores was nominated for the first Hugo Award for Best Graphic Story.

== See also ==
- Mary Shelley's novel The Last Man (1826)
- 1924 film: The Last Man on Earth
- Pat Frank's novel Mr. Adam (1946)
- Consider Her Ways (1956)
- 1970 film: Crimes of the Future
- Robert Merle's The Virility Factor (1974)
- James Tiptree, Jr.'s short story "Houston, Houston, Do You Read?" (1976)
- Frank Herbert's novel The White Plague (1982)
- Juliusz Machulski's film Sexmission (1984)
- P. D. James's novel The Children of Men (1992)
- Nintendo 64 games BattleTanx (1998) and BattleTanx: Global Assault
- 1999 film: The Last Man on Planet Earth
- Indie game Lisa: The Painful (2014)
- The Last Man on Earth, which debuted in 2015
- 2017 novel Sleeping Beauties by Stephen and Owen King
- Lauren Beukes's novel Afterland
