= List of Y: The Last Man characters =

Yorick Brown

Alter and Agent 355

Y: The Last Man is a comic book series written by Brian K. Vaughan and published by Vertigo Comics, about one human male (and a male Capuchin monkey) surviving the spontaneous, simultaneous death of all other male mammals on Earth.

== Protagonists ==
=== Yorick Brown ===
Yorick Brown is the last man on Earth. As such, he often has to travel in disguise to avoid drawing attention from groups like the Daughters of the Amazon. One possible reason he survived the plague is because he owned the monkey Ampersand, and handling Ampersand's feces in cleaning him up gave him Ampersand's resistance to the plague. Another is that a mystical ring protected him from the effects of the plague. Neither explanation is made explicitly clear as the reason for his survival. He is the son of Jennifer Brown. His sister is Hero Brown.

After the plague hit, Yorick became suicidal due to survivor's guilt; only intervention by Agent 711 restored his will to live. Yorick is also Beth Deville's boyfriend, and maintains a semi-monogamous relationship with her. During their four years apart, he sleeps with one other woman and kisses two others. Since learning that Beth was still alive, he has become obsessed with trying to reunite with her, often leading to arguments with Agent 355 and Dr. Allison Mann over what their priorities should be.

Eventually, he and Beth finally reunite in Paris. However, Beth shocks Yorick by revealing that she had planned to break up with him just before the plague hit, making Yorick realize his entire quest was for nothing. Beth says she is ready to marry Yorick now that he has matured during his journey, but Yorick leaves, just missing his older sister Hero and the other Beth bringing his daughter. He realizes that the love of his life is actually 355 and goes to find her.

Just as they prepare to start a relationship, 355 is shot dead by Alter, leaving Yorick completely devastated. Alter confronts him, but even though she murdered his mother and the woman he loved, he is unable to kill her. He spent years with Beth 2, apparently never loving her and more and more devastated by 355's death. In issue #60, he reflects on all the things he lost during the previous 60 years (including Dr. Mann and Ampersand) and manages to escape the padded cell to which his daughter committed him in order to prevent him from killing himself. His final fate is uncertain.

In 2011, Yorick Brown was ranked 24th among the top 100 comic book heroes by IGN. Brown was listed in 2008 by Wizard magazine as 23rd among comic book characters.

=== Ampersand ===
Ampersand

Ampersand is Yorick's Capuchin monkey and the only other male mammal to survive the plague. Yorick is raising Ampersand, a helper monkey who will eventually be trained to help an individual with a severe disability (this scenario is based on the real-life Boston organization Helping Hands). Yorick and Ampersand develop a close bond, and the monkey also bonds with other characters as well.

It is suggested in Y: The Last Man #30 that Ampersand is a genetic mutation, and contact with his feces is actually the reason Yorick survived the Plague. Issue 60 shows an aged Ampersand during a flashback when Yorick visits Agent 355's grave. Yorick, not wanting Ampersand to suffer, feeds him a poisoned grape, and Ampersand dies at 355's grave. When the original Yorick is shown in his cell, he is accompanied by many clones of Ampersand, all acting well behaved, and laments, "A hundred monkeys later and they still haven't gotten him right."

=== Agent 355 ===
Agent 355 (pronounced "three fifty-five" and sometimes referred to by the other characters as simply "three-fifty") is a secret agent with the Culper Ring, a mysterious United States government agency. She is at least the tenth agent to have that number, dating back to the original Agent 355 who served under George Washington. She is quite adept with firearms, but her trademark weapon is a collapsible baton. She is reluctant to kill, but becomes more cold-blooded after hearing of the death of her childhood friend Agent 711. During the "Widow's Pass" storyline, 355 reveals that she has total recall, and during the series appears to quickly and easily remember minute details. Her parents and sister were killed in a car accident when she was young and she was recruited while fleeing a foster home following a fight with two racist boys. When the plague struck, she had just removed an artifact called the Amulet of Helene from the nation of Jordan. Because the amulet's deceased owner warned that if it was ever taken from its homeland, it would create a tragedy greater than the Trojan War, she has been blamed by some for the plague. Once Margaret Valentine takes over as United States President, the agent is assigned to be Yorick Brown's bodyguard. She spends the next five years with Yorick and Dr. Mann. She is quickly revealed to have strong feelings for both of them, and goes very far to protect them. When Dr. Mann leaves them, she and Yorick grow even closer. She leaves him to go with Beth, but Yorick eventually comes back to her. Later she and Yorick confess their mutual love for each other. She then whispered her true name to Yorick, only to be killed a second later by Alter, devastating Yorick for the rest of his life.

Although her original name is never explicitly revealed, in an interview with Entertainment Weekly, Brian K. Vaughan revealed that there are clues to her name in the series. The Vertigo website's characters page lists her first name as Peace.

=== Doctor Allison Mann ===
Doctor Allison Mann is an expert geneticist, seeking to discover the cause of the plague and why Yorick survived. When her main lab in Boston is burned down, Yorick and 355 accompany her to her backup lab in California so Mann can recover her notes to help her solve the mystery of the plague. Mann believes she may be responsible for the plague, since it happened the instant she gave birth to her non-viable clone. She is Chinese and Japanese by parentage, and changed her name to Allison Mann from Ayuko Matsumori to annoy her Japanese father. At a young age, she moved to Los Angeles, California with her father. She told her father that she was a lesbian before he left the United States. Her first lover was named Mercedes, and she later develops feelings for Agent 355. Her previous failed relationships (and her parents' unhappy marriage) have given Allison a cynical attitude towards love; she claims at one point that it is a mere biological imperative.

After graduating from UC Berkeley she was given a job at Harvard University. Years later at Harvard, a male student named Sunil helped impregnate Mann with her own clone. While on board the smuggler ship The Whale, Allison meets Rose, a spy for the Australian navy, and later Allison's girlfriend. Her mother learns Allison is gay during the "Kimono Dragons" story arc. Mann later learns her father is still alive, and has multiple clones of her. She kills him to protect Yorick. Allison and Rose decide to stay behind to work on impregnating Rose with the first of Yorick's clones and to help her mother raise the multiple clones of Allison. Due to unforeseen tumors resulting from her attempt to give birth to her own clone, Allison is no longer able to have children herself. She dies several years after parting ways with Yorick and company.

== Family and friends ==
=== Beth Deville ===
Beth is Yorick's girlfriend. When the plague hits, she is engaged in anthropological work in Australia. For a time, she is stranded in the Outback, but leaves for Paris after a hallucination that convinces her Yorick is headed there. Her favorite movie is Miller's Crossing. In issue #56, she and Yorick finally reconnect but, in issue #57, after having sex, Beth reveals that she had been planning to break up with Yorick just before the plague hit. Yorick is shocked that he spent five years searching for a woman planning to dump him. Unwilling to believe Beth's love had reappeared in their time apart, he leaves realizing his love for Agent 355. Before she can go after him, Beth is confronted by Yorick's sister, Hero, who has brought the second Beth and Yorick's daughter. At the end of the series, it is shown that Beth and Hero have begun a romantic relationship.

=== Beth II ===
Beth II is a former flight attendant who was in the air when the plague hit. She was able to land the plane, but most of the passengers were killed in the crash. Feeling guilty over their deaths, she takes up residence in an abandoned Catholic church, where she meets Yorick Brown. The two have unprotected sex, and it is eventually revealed that she is pregnant with his child (an ultrasound shows it to be a girl). Yorick sends Beth a letter by way of his sister Hero, asking Beth to befriend his sister. He feels the two "nutty broads" deserve one another. In issue #44, it is revealed that Beth II has given birth and named her daughter Beth Junior. In issue #60, Beth Jr. reveals that Yorick and Beth attempted to form a relationship for the sake of their daughter, but were never able to hide the fact that their relationship was not based upon love, Yorick only loving the deceased Agent 355.

She is one of the many characters to not receive a legitimate last name.

=== Beth Jr. ===
Beth Junior is the infant daughter of Beth II and Yorick Brown. She eventually becomes the President of France, as shown in the final issue of the series.

=== Yorick Brown "the 17th" ===
Set sixty years after issue #59, the final issue shows an elderly Yorick reflecting on missing scenes from his past. Yorick the 17th, a 22-year-old clone of Yorick, visits him at the Élysée Palace in Paris, France

=== Bonny ===
Bonny is a female capuchin adopted by Yorick and his friends following the apparent death of her former owner, Captain Kilina. She eventually mates successfully with Ampersand.

=== Hero Brown ===
Hero Brown is Yorick Brown's older sister, a paramedic and a Sarah Lawrence graduate who joined the Daughters of the Amazon after the plague. She lives in Boston and, after learning that a surviving male is headed there, volunteers to track and kill him. As a victim of the Amazons' brainwashing, she is extremely angry towards Yorick and tries to kill him, but eventually realizes that she is wrong. Hero is deprogrammed (though she still sometimes hears the voice of the Amazon leader in her head, though this may be a lifelong condition as she talked with a "Queen Victoria" even in her childhood) and agrees to help her mother Jennifer find Yorick. There is a strong implication that Hero was sexually abused by her grandfather as a child (as Yorick was abused by one of his childhood friends). She and Beth II have become friends (thanks to Yorick) and travel together for some time. Hero, Ciba, Natalya, Beth II, Beth Jr., and Vlad travel to Paris to meet up with Yorick. She seems to have largely overcome the anger and resentment that drew her to the Amazons. After Yorick leaves Beth Deville in Paris, Hero, Beth II and Beth Jr. show up only to find that Yorick has already left. In the final issue, it is revealed Hero and Beth Deville became lovers.

=== Representative Jennifer Brown ===
Jennifer Brown is originally the Representative of Ohio's 22nd district (which no longer exists) and mother of Yorick and Hero Brown. From dialog in the first issue, it is indicated that she is in her first term. She is a member of the Democratic Party, but is a strong opponent of the use of abortion as a method of contraception. After the plague, she becomes Secretary of the Interior. Believing Yorick has been kidnapped by the Culper Ring she informs Alter Tse'elon of her son's existence, as Israel has the only organised military force at the time. Later in the series, Alter shoots and kills her as revenge for damaging Alter's reputation.

=== Dr. M/Dr. Matsumori ===
Doctor Allison Mann's father, and also her main rival in cloning research. Mostly seen inside a biohazard suit with an opaque helmet, he seems to be responsible for Ampersand's surviving of the plague, due to testing of a special serum, and the plague itself. When the plague hits, he hires the ninja Toyota to retrieve Ampersand. He is revealed as Dr. Mann's father in issue #50, having also survived the plague. However, his survivor guilt and personal feelings toward the necessity of the male gender leads him to attempt a murder-suicide with Yorick. He is stopped by Allison and killed during the struggle.

=== Doctor Matsumori ===
A skilled Chinese surgeon with a love of agriculture and homeopathy, she is the mother of Dr Allison Mann. She advised President Valentine to send Yorick to Allison. At the end of "Kimono Dragons", she was kidnapped by Toyota. She reappears in the "Motherland" arc in Dr. M/ Dr. Matsumori's lab, having finished operating on Allison. At the end of the arc, she is revealed to be taking care of Allison's clones, now that Dr. M/ Dr. Matsumori is dead. She was originally suspected to be Dr. M.

=== Doctor Ming ===
Dr. Matsumori's lover; died while giving birth to a clone. She is one of four characters in the series who could conceivably have been the Dr. M referred to by Toyota, along with Dr. Alison Mann and both of her parents. She believes in the controversial theory of morphic resonance which may have been a contributing factor to the gendercide.

=== Rose Copen ===
Lieutenant Rose Copen is a spy and demolitions expert for the Australian navy, and is Allison Mann's lover. She wears an eyepatch after losing an eye in a firefight with a Tasmanian woman. She joins Yorick, 355, and Dr. Mann on their quest to rescue Ampersand. Her true agenda becomes clear after Dr. Mann's mother stabs her with a jian: delirious, she confesses that she had been sent to spy on them. However, she maintains that she is in love with Allison, goes AWOL, and later agrees to be impregnated with Yorick's clone for the benefit of Allison's research.

== Others ==
=== Previous Agent 355 ===
Before the current Agent 355, there were 9 others; the current was recruited by the former. The one that recruited the current Agent 355 died by her hand years later after the younger 355 foiled her attempt at assassinating then-U.S. president Bill Clinton after the Monica Lewinsky scandal.

=== Agent 711 ===
Former member of the Culper Ring and childhood friend of Agent 355, she performs a suicide intervention treatment on Yorick after reading 355's journal and realizing the Last Man is suicidal. Her actual name is revealed to be "Jacqueline" in a flashback during issue #41. She is the widow of Agent 1451 who was assassinated by 17 November, and still mourns him. She is killed by Anna Strong and the two Setauket Ring agents under her command.

"711" was the code number used by the Culper Ring to refer to General George Washington during the American Revolutionary War.

=== Agent 1033 ===
Prime and mentor of Agent 355. Agent 355 intended to marry him, but cancelled their engagement a few months before the plague when she realized their common experiences were not enough to base a relationship on. He died in the plague.

=== Alter Tse'elon ===
New chief of the general staff for Israel, Alter is the leader of an Israeli commando unit sent to acquire Yorick Brown for her nation and is one of the story's main antagonists. She faces court martial but manages to escape by convincing her guards to join her and shoot the judge. "Alter" (meaning "old man") is in fact only her nickname; because two of her siblings before her died in childbirth, her parents followed the folk practice of never speaking her real name so that the angel of death would be unable to find her and take her life. When she believes that Yorick is about to kill her, she announces her name as Yedida ("friend"). Alter continuously pursues the last man in an effort to give Israel a strong bargaining position against the rest of the world for what she feels will be an inevitable assault on the Jewish people. She may also be trying to provoke a war in the belief that an external enemy is necessary to avoid internal discord in Israel. However five years after the plague no attacks on Israel have occurred.

She inspires others to follow her in her quest for the last man, going so far as to forge evidence to motivate her troops. She often tells others that her sister was killed by Palestinian terrorists, but it turns out that she was accidentally killed by IDF forces while protesting the destruction of Palestinian homes; when she is questioned about this, she justifies her earlier story by claiming that her sister died because of the Palestinians, thus in a way they did kill her. She kills members of her own unit who question her actions, and is responsible for the murder of Yorick's mother Jennifer Brown and Agent 355. Ultimately, it is revealed that she suffers from survivor's guilt in much the same way as Yorick did, brought about by the death of her sister. Like Yorick, she seeks to end her life through a form of assisted suicide, which she attempts to achieve by joining the military and taking dangerous postings. Following the plague, Alter's quest to find Yorick is shown to be motivated solely by her desire to be killed by him, as she considers him – as the sole remaining man – the only one worthy of doing so. Instead, Yorick knocks her out and leaves her to the IDF troops; her fate following these events remains unknown.

=== Anna Strong ===
One of the senior officials of the Setauket Ring. She was paralyzed and left for dead by Agent 355 after Hero reveals Agent 711's murder, however, she may have been later rescued by other members of the Ring.

=== Bobbi ===
A travelling male impersonator and prostitute who mistakes Yorick for a member of her own profession. Later forms a relationship with Waverly.

=== Captain Belleville ===
Captain of a Collins class submarine (HMAS Williamson) in the Australian navy.

=== Ciba Weber ===
A scientist who was in orbit on the International Space Station when the plague hit. While trapped aboard the station, she falls in love with her two male crewmates (one Russian, one American). The trio crash to Earth in an escape attempt and Ciba is the only survivor. It is revealed she is pregnant but does not know who the father is. She later gives birth to a boy and afterwards names him Vladimir, after his late father. Ciba, Natalya, Hero, Beth II and Beth Jr. flee just in time to avoid capture by Alter and her soldiers. Having heard that Yorick was on his way to Paris to meet Beth Deville, the escapees head to Paris to find him.

=== Daughters of the Amazon ===
The fanatical Daughters of the Amazon believe that Mother Earth cleansed itself of the "aberration" of the Y chromosome. They engage in the arson of sperm-banks, vandalism of 'patriarchal symbols' such as churches and monuments, theft of food and equipment (on the justification that women should be hunters not gatherers) and murder of male impersonators and trans men. Identified by their lack of a breast, which they remove in a rite of initiation, The Daughters spread out from coast to coast and have been a problem for a lot of people. The posse near 711's cabin know of them and make a point that they are not welcome in their area. Although the accusation is often leveled at them, the vast majority of Amazons do not appear to be lesbians. They are, like Hero, victims of Men who buy into the hate and anger spewed forth by the charismatic Victoria, and/or frightened and starving women looking for the security of a gang. After four years the Daughters of the Amazon begin to fade out, but the movement stays strong in New York. Former Amazons are shown working in various legitimate jobs, though they still maintain their misandrist views.

=== Epiphany ===
A former Canadian pop star who is trapped in Japan after the plague, and uses her wealth and popularity among teenage girls to recreate the Yakuza. She acquires Ampersand and treats the monkey as a surrogate child. She is deposed by former policewoman You after she and Agent 355 raid her headquarters. Her fate is unknown.

=== Fish & Bicycle Productions ===
A troupe of actresses who try to raise spirits by going to towns and performing plays, both classic and original. They are jarred that some women insist they act out their favorite soap operas and often clash on their contributions. Some cling to the idea that the plague was payback on how the arts would push out older women. When they find a runaway Ampersand, the leader, Cayce, is inspired to write a play called "The Last Man" in which the only man alive ends up killing himself to prevent bloodshed among the women.

In issue #54, the group has relocated to Los Angeles, trying to make movies as a way to get their message out but end up falling apart, with many of them realizing no one is listening. Cayce, however, ends up inspired to get her message out another way: by creating a comic book called I Am Woman which flips things around to show a world where all women but one died and how she lives in a world of even greater chaos. When Yorick is asked by 355 his opinion on this flip side of his own story, he simply remarks "Meh", but it is revealed that the comic is a bestseller in America, and possibly the rest of the world.

=== Heather and Heidi Hartle ===
Identical twin geneticists who live in Oldenbrook, Kansas (specifically the hot suite hidden under the barn). They are responsible for inoculating Vladimir with the vaccine sample developed (and entrusted to Hero) by Dr. Mann.

=== Joy ===
Joy was the leader of the militia group "Sons of Arizona" that blocked the I-40 in Queensbrook. A former nurse manager in an ER, she was convinced the plague was a plot by the federal government, and beat up Allison Mann in the belief that she was somehow involved. Killed by Agent 355.

=== Kilina ===
Kilina was the captain of The Whale, a former cruise ship taking Yorick and his companions to Japan. She had a fling with Yorick. It turns out her vessel is actually smuggling heroin. Rose, working under the orders of Captain Belleville, gives away her position. Kilina excused her actions on the grounds that she is bringing comfort (through drugs) and adventure to women, but the existence of Yorick makes her realize humanity is not inevitably doomed and she is in fact doing more harm than good. Kilina went missing, presumed dead after a torpedo attack carried out by the Australian Navy.

=== The Last Girls ===
A gang of pre-adolescent girls in Los Angeles who carjack a van belonging to Fish & Bicycle Productions. They paint their guns in bright colors so the police will mistake them for toys. Originally mistaken for Daughters of the Amazon, they deride them as "yesterday's weak sauce".

=== Leah ===
Leah was the teenaged daughter of militia leader Joy. During an armed confrontation, Yorick shoots her in the thigh, but the bullet severs an artery and she bleeds to death.

=== Lefter ===
Lefter appears in Yorick's flashback caused by Agent 711. He knew Yorick when they were kids. While playing an escape game, Lefter molested a bound Yorick.

=== Lucia Ober ===
Sister Lucia Ober is the highest-ranked woman in the Catholic Church. She is on a mission to investigate all reported 'virgin births' in the hope of finding a male child who can be the next pope. She kidnaps Beth II and Hero, but releases them unharmed when an ultrasound reveals Beth's child to be female.

=== President Margaret Valentine ===
Former Secretary of Agriculture and current President of the United States. She becomes president after the other ranking woman on the chain of succession, Secretary of the Interior Richburg, dies in a plane crash (at the time the comic was written, the real Secretary of Agriculture was Ann Margaret Veneman, and the real Secretary of the Interior was the highest woman in the Cabinet). She evidently won election in 2004, although she recognizes it is because she is the most famous woman as "no one knows where Oprah is hiding."

=== Mercedes ===
The first lover of Dr. Allison Mann. She ends their relationship as they are about to graduate, saying it was a game. Allison is devastated by this, and later develops a cynical attitude toward love as a result.

=== Natalya Zamyatin ===
She is a Russian secret agent, sent to retrieve the astronauts who survived the plague on the International Space Station. After they are killed, she remains with the Hartle twins to protect the post-plague's first newborn male. She wears the Gold Star of a Hero of the Russian Federation, and carries a sniper rifle named after her husband killed in the plague. Her poor English is often joked about by the other characters but in the future her English improves beyond anyone's expectation.

=== Paloma West ===
A war correspondent before the plague, Paloma now works for the tabloid newspaper Monthly Visitor. She takes a naked picture of Yorick (holding a current paper) to prove the existence of a living male and, despite threats from Agent 355, refuses to hand over the film.

=== P.J. ===
P.J. lived in Queensbrook and gave shelter to Yorick and his friends. She formerly played bass in a California ska band and ran her late father's garage. Later, she was killed by Leah.

=== Sadie ===
Sadie was part of the Israeli forces, serving under Alter Tse'elon. She was Alter's only friend, and accompanied her on their mission to the United States to capture the last man, but turned against Alter when she tried to kill the male astronauts. Sadie is later seen presiding over Alter's court martial, only to be assassinated by the guards who are loyal to Alter. Alter is often seen feeling incredibly guilty about killing her, but that never stopped her from continuing her quest.

=== Setauket Ring ===
A secret organisation made up of disgruntled secret agents who left the Culper Ring after President Carter restructured it in 1977. They are searching for the Amulet of Heléne, believing that the cause of the plague was the said item being removed from Jordan.

=== Sonia ===
A former methamphetamine addict and inmate at the Marrisville prison. Sonia was sentenced to ten years after her boyfriend, in exchange for a reduced sentence, claimed she was the leader of his drug-dealing ring. She had a brief romantic moment with Yorick. She kills Victoria to stop the Amazon leader from executing Yorick, and is then killed by Hero.

=== Toyota ===
Toyota

A mercenary ninja who stalks and abducts Ampersand and takes him back to Japan on the orders of the mysterious "Doctor M". She is short-tempered and violent, going so far as to cut off a part of Ampersand's tail every time he misbehaves. Her parents were killed in a tsunami in 1983. As a teenager, she was caught breaking into the lab of Dr. Mann's father, who then arranged for her to receive training in the martial arts from The Perfect Circle, an organization formed in the 1940s by Emperor Hirohito as a countermeasure to the Culper Ring. In the "Motherland" arc, she reveals that one of the reasons she stays in Dr. M/Dr. Matsumori's employment is so she would be given a long line of clones, thus "(she) would never really die." She is stabbed in the head with a broken naginata by Agent 355.

=== Velvet ===
A black Daughter of the Amazon who first appears in issue 25. Her group does not practice the mastectomy, so that people encountering her may not believe she is a "real" Amazon. She appears to be the only one who recognizes Yorick's "voice of God" speech as a quote from Pulp Fiction, prompting Beth II to tell her she is "too smart to be running with those airheads." This seems to have made some impression, as when she is next seen in issue #54 she is acting in Fish & Bicycle Pictures ill-fated movie project, and is the ringleader in the walkout of most of the cast.

=== Victoria ===
Victoria was the charismatic and manipulative leader of the Daughters of the Amazon. She claimed to have been a master chess player before the plague, but male sexism kept her from the recognition she deserved. She believes that all men are rapists, serial killers and abusers. She was killed by way of an axe to the head (thrown by Sonia). Victoria still exists, in a way, as an image and voice in Hero's mind. She may have been partly inspired by Marilyn French's character Val.

=== Vladimir and Joe ===
Two male astronauts who survived the plague. During their months trapped on the International Space Station, they both became the lovers of Ciba Weber. When the Soyuz re-entry vessel started to burn on landing, they insisted on pushing her to safety (even though their lives were more valuable for the survival of the human race) as she was pregnant. Both men died in the subsequent explosion.

=== Vladimir Jr. ===
The infant son of Ciba and Vladimir, conceived on the International Space Station and born in the "hot suite" run by the Hartle sisters. Aside from Yorick and Ampersand, the last known living male on the planet. In "Kimono Dragons", Vladimir Jr. is seen running around outside his hot suite, indicating that the twins found a way to turn the generic strain found in Ampersand's feces into a vaccine. In the final issue, it is revealed that he eventually becomes Czar of Russia.

=== Waverly ===
A former supermodel turned disposer of bodies when her former job becomes irrelevant after the plague. She handcuffs Yorick with the intention of selling him, but he escapes. Her garbage truck is later stolen by Agent 355 in order to get Margaret Valentine to the White House. Although her boyfriend, a trans man, was murdered by the Daughters of the Amazon she entices some of their members away from the group by offering them legitimate jobs, though she has to stop them from murdering male impersonator Bobbi. She then forms a relationship with Bobbi, and responds angrily to her wish to return to prostitution by saying that in the post-male world, they can be more than "just bodies".

=== You ===
You was a Ginza-Yonchome Koban. Getting bored of babysitting drunks and dealing with tourists, she quits the police force and became a Wakaresaseya. After the gendercide You purchases and upgrades a male android to provide a personal service in her night club The Love Goddess. She helps Agent 355 raid the headquarters of the Yakuza, and later convinces the followers of Epiphany to accept her as their new leader.
