= Prometheus Award =

Annual award for libertarian science fiction novels

- Awarded for: The best science fiction or fantasy fiction promoting individual freedom and human rights, or critiquing tyranny, slavery, war and other abuses of government power.
- Country: United States
- Presented by: Libertarian Futurist Society
- First award: 1979
- Currently held by: Michael Flynn (In the Belly of the Whale)
- Website: lfs.org

The Prometheus Award is an award for libertarian science fiction given annually by the Libertarian Futurist Society. American author and activist L. Neil Smith established the Best Novel category for the award in 1979; however, it was not awarded regularly until the newly founded Libertarian Futurist Society revived it in 1982. The Society created a Prometheus Hall of Fame Award (for classic works of libertarian and anti-authoritarian science fiction and fantasy, not necessarily novels) in 1983, and also presents occasional one-off Special Awards.

While the Best Novel category is limited to novels published in English for the first time during the previous calendar year, Hall of Fame nominees — which must have been published at least 20 years ago — may be in any narrative or dramatic form, including novels, novellas, stories, films, television series or episodes, plays, musicals, graphic novels, song lyrics, or verse.

The Best Novel winner receives a plaque with a one-ounce gold coin, and the Hall of Fame winner a plaque with a smaller gold coin.

== Prometheus Blog Appreciation Series ==
Since 2019, LFS members have launched an Appreciation series of review-essays honoring all past winners and making clear why each work of fiction fits the distinctive focus of the award – something that was viewed as not necessarily obvious to sf/fantasy fans unfamiliar with the broad scope of libertarian thinking and analysis, which often overlaps with classical liberalism, its philosophical cousin.

Each Appreciation review-essay is published on the Prometheus Blog at https://www.lfs.org/blog/ and then linked next to each winning title on the past-winners list posted on the LFS website's Prometheus Awards page.

== Multiple recipients ==
Some authors have won the award for best novel more than once:

=== Thrice ===
- Cory Doctorow
- Michael F. Flynn
- Victor Koman
- Ken MacLeod
- L. Neil Smith

=== Twice ===
- Travis J. I. Corcoran
- James P. Hogan
- Neal Stephenson
- Vernor Vinge
- F. Paul Wilson
- Daniel Suarez

Five authors have won the Prometheus Hall of Fame award more than once:

- Poul Anderson
- Robert Heinlein
- George Orwell
- Ayn Rand
- F. Paul Wilson

== Process ==
Books published in a given year are eligible (although books from the last few months of the previous year are also eligible if it is felt that they have been overlooked).

1. All members may nominate novels for the award.
2. Members of the Best Novel Committee read all of the nominated novels (typically between 12 and 16) and vote for a slate of typically 5 finalists.
3. Full members, Sponsors and Benefactors (higher membership levels) then vote on the finalists.

Step 2 happens in the first few months of the following year.

Step 3 happens in early summer of the following year.

The awards were historically given at the Annual Worldcon or NASFIC. Since the pandemic, they have been presented live via Zoom and then posted on YouTube and the Videos page of the LFS website (www.lfs.org).

== Prometheus Award winners and finalists ==
* Winners + No winner selected

List of winners and finalists for the Prometheus Award
Year	Author	Novel	Publisher	Ref.
1979	F. Paul Wilson*	Wheels Within Wheels	Doubleday	
1979	Poul Anderson	The Avatar	Berkley Books	
1979	James P. Hogan	The Genesis Machine	Del Rey Books	
1982	L. Neil Smith*	The Probability Broach	Del Rey Books	
1982	J. Neil Schulman	Alongside Night	Crown Publishers	
1982	F. Paul Wilson	An Enemy of the State	Doubleday	
1982	Norman Spinrad	Songs from the Stars	Simon & Schuster	
1982	Samuel R. Delany	Tales of Nevèrÿon	Bantam Books	
1982	Kay Nolte Smith	The Watcher	Ace Books	
1983	James P. Hogan*	Voyage from Yesteryear	Del Rey Books	
1983	Ann Maxwell	Fire Dancer	New American Library	
1983	Robert A. Heinlein	Friday	Holt, Rinehart and Winston	
1983	Julian May	The Many-Colored Land	Houghton Mifflin	
1983	Larry Niven and Jerry Pournelle	Oath of Fealty	Phantasia Press	
1984	J. Neil Schulman*	The Rainbow Cadenza	Simon & Schuster	
1984	Erika Holzer	Double Crossing	Putnam	
1984	L. Neil Smith	The Nagasaki Vector	Del Rey Books	
1984	Poul Anderson	Orion Shall Rise	Phantasia Press	
1984	Marion Zimmer Bradley and Jacqueline Lichtenberg	Thendara House	DAW Books	
1985	(no award)+			
1985	Gordon R. Dickson	The Final Encyclopedia	Tor Books	
1985	G. Harry Stine	Manna	Analog Science Fiction and Fact	
1985	Vernor Vinge	The Peace War	Analog Science Fiction and Fact	
1985	L. Neil Smith	Tom Paine Maru	Del Rey Books	
1985	F. Paul Wilson	The Tomb	Berkley Books	
1986	Victor Milán*	The Cybernetic Samurai	Arbor House	
1986	Kay Nolte Smith	Elegy for a Soprano	Severn House	
1986	L. Neil Smith	The Gallatin Divergence	Del Rey Books	
1986	Glen Cook	A Matter of Time	Ace Books	
1986	Philip K. Dick	Radio Free Albemuth	Arbor House	
1987	Vernor Vinge*	Marooned in Realtime	Analog Science Fiction and Fact	
1987	Melinda M. Snodgrass	Circuit	Berkley Books	
1987	L. Neil Smith	The Crystal Empire	Tor Books	
1987	Joan Slonczewski	A Door into Ocean	Arbor House	
1987	Margaret Atwood	The Handmaid's Tale	McClelland & Stewart	
1988	Victor Koman*	The Jehovah Contract	Franklin Watts	
1988	Melinda M. Snodgrass	Circuit Breaker	Berkley Books	
1988	Thomas T. Thomas	First Citizen	Baen Books	
1988	David Brin	The Uplift War	Phantasia Press	
1988	Gordon R. Dickson	Way of the Pilgrim	Ace Books	
1989	Brad Linaweaver*	Moon of Ice	Arbor House	
1989	Marc Stiegler	David's Sling	Baen Books	
1989	Lois McMaster Bujold	Falling Free	Analog Science Fiction and Fact	
1989	Melinda M. Snodgrass	Final Circuit	Ace Books	
1989	Robert A. Heinlein	To Sail Beyond the Sunset	Ace Books	
1990	Victor Koman*	Solomon's Knife	Franklin Watts	
1990	Poul Anderson	The Boat of a Million Years	Tor Books	
1990	L. Neil Smith	Henry Martyn	Tor Books	
1990	Barry B. Longyear	Infinity Hold	Questar	
1990	James P. Hogan	The Mirror Maze	Bantam Spectra	
1991	Michael F. Flynn*	In the Country of the Blind	Baen Books	
1991	Victor Milán	The Cybernetic Shogun	William Morrow and Company	
1991	F. Paul Wilson	The Tery	Baen Books	
1991	S. M. Stirling	Under the Yoke	Baen Books	
1991	Alan Moore and David Lloyd	V for Vendetta	Warner Books	
1992	Larry Niven, Jerry Pournelle and Michael F. Flynn*	Fallen Angels	Baen Books	
1992	Diane Carey	Distant Drums	Domain	
1992	Joel Rosenberg	D'Shai	Ace Books	
1992	James P. Hogan	The Infinity Gambit	Bantam Books	
1992	Thomas T. Thomas	ME: A Novel of Self-Discovery	Baen Books	
1992	Charles Platt	The Silicon Man	Bantam Spectra	
1992	Peter David	Star Trek#57: The Rift	Pocket Books	
1992	Kay Nolte Smith	A Tale of the Wind	Villard	
1993	James P. Hogan*	The Multiplex Man	Bantam Spectra	
1993	Orson Scott Card	The Memory of Earth	Tor Books	
1993	Neal Stephenson	Snow Crash	Bantam Spectra	
1993	John Varley	Steel Beach	Ace Books	
1993	Robert L. Forward	Timemaster	Tor Books	
1993	Rex Denver Borough	A Woman's Place	American West Books	
1994	L. Neil Smith*	Pallas	Tor Books	
1994	Nancy Kress	Beggars in Spain	AvoNova/William Morrow	
1994	M. J. Engh	Rainbow Man	Tor Books	
1994	Charles Platt	The Silicon Man	Bantam Spectra	
1994	Amy Thomson	Virtual Girl	Ace Books	
1995	Poul Anderson*	The Stars Are Also Fire	Tor Books	
1995	Dean Koontz	Dark Rivers of the Heart	Charnel House	
1995	Richard Fulmer	Deadly Care (novel)	Vantage Press	
1995	F. Paul Wilson	The Select	Headline	
1995	A. A. Attanasio	Solis	Hodder & Stoughton	
1996	Ken MacLeod*	The Star Fraction	Legend Books	
1996	Victor Milán	CLD: Collective Landing Detachment	AvoNova	
1996	Eric Frank Russell and Alan Dean Foster	Design for Great-Day	Tor Books	
1996	Neal Stephenson	The Diamond Age	Bantam Spectra	
1996	Ursula K. Le Guin	Four Ways to Forgiveness	Harper Prism	
1997	Victor Koman*	Kings of the High Frontier	Pulpless.com	
1997	Michael F. Flynn	Firestar	Tor Books	
1997	James P. Hogan	Paths to Otherwhere	Baen Books	
1997	Brad Linaweaver	Sliders: the Novel	Boulevard Books	
1997	Steven Gould	Wildside	Tor Books	
1998	Ken MacLeod*	The Stone Canal	Legend Books	
1998	L. Neil Smith	Bretta Martyn	Tor Books	
1998	C. J. Cherryh	Finity's End	Warner Books	
1998	Poul Anderson	The Fleet of Stars	Tor Books	
1998	Bart Kosko	Nanotime	Avon Books	
1999	John Varley*	The Golden Globe	Ace Books	
1999	F. Paul Wilson and Matthew Costello	Masque	Aspect/Warner Books	
1999	Ben Bova	Moonwar	Hodder & Stoughton	
1999	Michael F. Flynn	Rogue Star	Tor Books	
1999	Don L. Tiggre	Y2K: The Millennium Bug	Xlibris	
2000	Vernor Vinge*	A Deepness in the Sky	Tor Books	
2000	Ken MacLeod	The Cassini Division	Orbit Books	
2000	James P. Hogan	Cradle of Saturn	Baen Books	
2000	Neal Stephenson	Cryptonomicon	Avon Books	
2000	Gregory Benford	The Martian Race	Aspect/Warner Books	
2001	L. Neil Smith*	The Forge of the Elders	Baen Books	
2001	Steve White	Eagle Against the Stars	Baen Books	
2001	Michael F. Flynn	Lodestar	Tor Books	
2001	Ken MacLeod	The Sky Road	Orbit Books	
2001	Terry Pratchett	The Truth	HarperCollins	
2002	Donald Kingsbury*	Psychohistorical Crisis	Tor Books	
2002	L. Neil Smith	The American Zone	Tor Books	
2002	Karen Michalson	Enemy Glory	Tor Books	
2002	Michael F. Flynn	Falling Stars	Tor Books	
2002	F. Paul Wilson	Hosts	Tor Books	
2003	Terry Pratchett*	Night Watch	Doubleday	
2003	Ken MacLeod	Dark Light	Orbit Books	
2003	J. Neil Schulman	Escape from Heaven	Pulpless.com	
2003	F. Paul Wilson	The Haunted Air	Tor Books	
2003	Greg Egan	Schild's Ladder	Gollancz	
2004	F. Paul Wilson*	Sims	Tor Books	
2004	J. K. Rowling	Harry Potter and the Order of the Phoenix	Bloomsbury Publishing	
2004	Terry Goodkind	Naked Empire	Tor Books	
2004	Paul Levinson	The Pixel Eye	Tor Books	
2004	Chris Moriarty	Spin State	Bantam Spectra	
2005	Neal Stephenson*	The System of the World	William Morrow	
2005	Brad Linaweaver and J. Kent Hastings	Anarquia	Sense of Wonder Press	
2005	Elizabeth Moon	Marque and Reprisal	Del Rey Books	
2005	Ken MacLeod	Newton's Wake: A Space Opera	Orbit Books	
2005	Michael Crichton	State of Fear	HarperCollins	
2006	Ken MacLeod*	Learning the World	Orbit Books	
2006	Walter Mosley	47	Little, Brown	
2006	Vin Suprynowicz	The Black Arrow: A Tale of the Resistance	Mountain Media	
2006	Terry Goodkind	Chainfire	Tor Books	
2006	Charles Stross	The Hidden Family	Tor Books	
2006	Claire Wolfe and Aaron S. Zelman	RebelFire: Out of the Gray Zone	Rebelfire Press	
2007	Charles Stross*	Glasshouse	Ace Books	
2007	Orson Scott Card	Empire	Tor Books	
2007	John Scalzi	The Ghost Brigades	Tor Books	
2007	F. Paul Wilson	Harbingers	Tor Books	
2007	Vernor Vinge	Rainbows End	Tor Books	
2008	Harry Turtledove*	The Gladiator	Tor Books	
2008	Jo Walton*	Ha'penny	Tor Books	
2008	Ken MacLeod	The Execution Channel	Orbit Books	
2008	Larry Niven and Edward M. Lerner	Fleet of Worlds	Tor Books	
2008	Tobias S. Buckell	Ragamuffin	Tor Books	
2009	Cory Doctorow*	Little Brother	Tor Books	
2009	Jo Walton	Half a Crown	Tor Books	
2009	Michael F. Flynn	The January Dancer	Tor Books	
2009	Iain M. Banks	Matter	Orbit Books	
2009	Harry Turtledove	Opening Atlantis	Roc Books	
2009	Charles Stross	Saturn's Children	Ace Books	
2010	Dani and Eytan Kollin*	The Unincorporated Man	Tor Books	
2010	Orson Scott Card	Hidden Empire	Tor Books	
2010	Harry Turtledove	Liberating Atlantis	Roc Books	
2010	Cory Doctorow	Makers	Tor Books	
2010	Harry Turtledove	The United States of Atlantis	Roc Books	
2011	Sarah A. Hoyt*	Darkship Thieves	Baen Books	
2011	L. Neil Smith	Ceres	Phoenix Pick	
2011	Cory Doctorow	For the Win	Tor Books	
2011	Kevin MacArdry	The Last Trumpet Project	Lulu	
2011	John Ringo	Live Free or Die	Baen Books	
2012	Ernest Cline*	Ready Player One	Random House	
2012	Delia Sherman*	The Freedom Maze	Big Mouth House	
2012	Vernor Vinge	The Children of the Sky	Tor Books	
2012	Thomas L. James and Carl C. Carlsson	In the Shadow of Ares	Amazon Kindle	
2012	Ken MacLeod	The Restoration Game	Orbit Books	
2012	Terry Pratchett	Snuff	Doubleday	
2013	Cory Doctorow*	Pirate Cinema	Tor Books	
2013	Tobias S. Buckell	Arctic Rising	Tor Books	
2013	Dani and Eytan Kollin	The Unincorporated Future	Tor Books	
2013	Sarah A. Hoyt	Darkship Renegades	Baen Books	
2013	Daniel Suarez	Kill Decision	Dutton	
2014	Cory Doctorow*	Homeland	Tor Books	
2014	Ramez Naam*	Nexus	Angry Robot	
2014	Sarah A. Hoyt	A Few Good Men	Baen Books	
2014	Ramez Naam	Crux	Angry Robot	
2014	Marcus Sakey	Brilliance	Thomas & Mercer	
2015	Daniel Suarez*	Influx	Dutton	
2015	Cixin Liu	The Three-Body Problem	Tor Books	
2015	Terry Pratchett	Raising Steam	Doubleday	
2015	Marcus Sakey	A Better World	Thomas & Mercer	
2016	Neal Stephenson*	Seveneves	William Morrow and Company	
2016	Pierce Brown	Golden Son	Del Rey Books	
2016	Ramez Naam	Apex	Angry Robot	
2016	Jo Walton	The Just City	Tor Books	
2016	Gene Wolfe	A Borrowed Man	Tor Books	
2017	Johanna Sinisalo*	The Core of the Sun	Grove Press	
2017	Ken MacLeod	The Corporation Wars: Dissidence	Orbit Books	
2017	Ken MacLeod	The Corporation Wars: Insurgence	Orbit Books	
2017	Lionel Shriver	The Mandibles: A Family, 2029–2047	HarperCollins	
2017	L. Neil Smith	Blade of p'Na	Phoenix Pick	
2018	Travis J I Corcoran*	The Powers of the Earth	Morlock Publishing	
2018	Doug Casey and John Hunt	Drug Lord: High Ground	High Ground Books	
2018	Karl K. Gallagher	Torchship, Torchship Pilot and Torchship Captain	Kelt Haven Press	
2018	Sarah A. Hoyt	Darkship Revenge	Baen Books	
2018	Ken MacLeod	The Corporation Wars: Emergence	Orbit Books	
2018	Andy Weir	Artemis	Crown Books	
2019	Travis J I Corcoran	Causes of Separation	Morlock Publishing	
2019	Helen Dale	Kingdom of the Wicked	Ligature Pty Limited	
2019	Malka Older	State Tectonics	Tor Books	
2019	J. Neil Schulman	The Fractal Man	Steve Heller Publishing	
2019	Martha Wells	The Murderbot Diaries	Tor Books	
2020	C. J. Cherryh and Jane S. Fancher	Alliance Rising	DAW	
2020	Margaret Atwood	The Testaments	Random House: Nan A. Talese	
2020	Patrick Edwards	Ruin's Wake	Titan Books	
2020	Ian McDonald	Luna: Moon Rising	Tor Books	
2020	Marc Stiegler	Ode to Defiance	LMBPN Publishing	
2021	Barry B. Longyear	The Hook	Enchanteds	
2021	Mackey Chandler	Who Can Own the Stars?	Amazon Kindle	
2021	Karl K. Gallagher	Storm between the Stars	Kelt Haven Press	
2021	Marc Stiegler	Braintrust: Requiem	LMBPN Publishing	
2021	Dennis E. Taylor	Heaven's River	Amazon	
2022	Wil McCarthy	Rich Man's Sky	Baen Books	
2022	Karl K. Gallagher	Between Home and Ruin	Kelt Haven Press	
2022	Karl K. Gallagher	Seize What's Held Dear	Kelt Haven Press	
2022	Kazuo Ishiguro	Klara and the Sun	Faber and Faber	
2022	Lionel Shriver	Should We Stay or Should We Go	HarperCollins	
2023	Dave Freer	Cloud Castles	Magic Isle Press	
2023	C.J. Carey	Widowland	Quercus	
2023	Karl K. Gallagher	Captain Trader Helmsman Spy	Kelt Haven Press	
2023	"Dr. Insensitive Jerk" Gordon Hanka	A Beast Cannot Feign	Amazon	
2023	John Van Stry	Summer's End	Baen Books	
2024	Daniel Suarez	Critical Mass	Dutton	
2024	Howard Andrew Jones	Lord of a Shattered Land	Baen Books	
2024	Karl K. Gallagher	Swim Among the People	Kelt Haven Press	
2024	"Dr. Insensitive Jerk" Gordon Hanka	God's Girlfriend	Amazon	
2024	Devon Eriksen	Theft of Fire: Orbital Space#1	Devon Eriksen LLC	
2025	Michael F. Flynn	In the Belly of the Whale	CAEZIK SF & Fantasy	
2025	C. J. Cherryh and Jane S. Fancher	Alliance Unbound	DAW	
2025	Danny King	Cancelled: The Shape of Things to Come	Annie Mosse Press	
2025	Wil McCarthy	Beggar's Sky	Baen Books	
2025	Lionel Shriver	Mania	HarperCollins	
2026	Dave Freer	Storm Dragon	Raconteur Press	
2026	Karl K. Gallagher	War by Other Means	Kelt Haven	
2026	Sarah Hoyt	No Man's Land	Goldport Press	
2026	J. Kenton Pierce	A Kiss for Damocles	Raconteur Press	
2026	Harry Turtledove	Powerless	CAEZIK SF & Fantasy	

== Hall of Fame Award inductees ==
- 1983: Robert A. Heinlein, The Moon Is a Harsh Mistress | Ayn Rand, Atlas Shrugged
- 1984: George Orwell, Nineteen Eighty-Four | Ray Bradbury, Fahrenheit 451
- 1985: Poul Anderson, Trader to the Stars | Eric Frank Russell, The Great Explosion
- 1986: Cyril Kornbluth, The Syndic | Robert Anton Wilson / Robert Shea, Illuminatus! trilogy
- 1987: Robert A. Heinlein, Stranger in a Strange Land | Ayn Rand, "Anthem"
- 1988: Alfred Bester, The Stars My Destination
- 1989: J. Neil Schulman, Alongside Night
- 1990: F. Paul Wilson, The Healer
- 1991: F. Paul Wilson, An Enemy of the State
- 1992: Ira Levin, This Perfect Day
- 1993: Ursula K. Le Guin, The Dispossessed
- 1994: Yevgeny Zamyatin, We
- 1995: Poul Anderson, The Star Fox
- 1996: Robert A. Heinlein, Red Planet
- 1997: Robert A. Heinlein, Methuselah's Children
- 1998: Robert A. Heinlein, Time Enough for Love
- 1999: H. Beam Piper / John J. McGuire, A Planet for Texans (also known as Lone Star Planet)
- 2000: Hans Christian Andersen, "The Emperor's New Clothes"
- 2001: Jerry Pournelle / John F. Carr (editors), The Survival of Freedom
- 2002: Patrick McGoohan, The Prisoner (TV series)
- 2003: Robert A. Heinlein, "Requiem"
- 2004: Vernor Vinge, "The Ungoverned"
- 2005: A. E. van Vogt, The Weapon Shops of Isher
- 2006: Alan Moore (author) / David Lloyd (illustrator), V for Vendetta (graphic novel)
- 2007: Sinclair Lewis, It Can't Happen Here | Vernor Vinge, True Names
- 2008: Anthony Burgess, A Clockwork Orange
- 2009: J. R. R. Tolkien, The Lord of the Rings
- 2010: Poul Anderson, "No Truce with Kings"
- 2011: George Orwell, Animal Farm
- 2012: E. M. Forster, "The Machine Stops"
- 2013: Neal Stephenson, Cryptonomicon
- 2014: Lois McMaster Bujold, Falling Free
- 2015: Harlan Ellison, "'Repent, Harlequin!' Said the Ticktockman"
- 2016: Donald Kingsbury, Courtship Rite
- 2017: Robert A. Heinlein, "Coventry"
- 2018: Jack Williamson, "With Folded Hands"
- 2019: Kurt Vonnegut, "Harrison Bergeron"
- 2020: Poul Anderson, "Sam Hall"
- 2021: F. Paul Wilson, "Lipidleggin'"
- 2022: Robert A. Heinlein, Citizen of the Galaxy
- 2023: Robert A. Heinlein, "Free Men"
- 2024: Terry Pratchett, The Truth
- 2025: Poul Anderson, Orion Shall Rise
- 2026: Aldous Huxley, Brave New World

== Special Award recipients ==
- 1998: Brad Linaweaver and Edward E. Kramer: editors, Free Space (anthology)
- 2001: Poul Anderson, Special Prometheus Award for Lifetime Achievement
- 2005: Mark Tier and Martin H. Greenberg: editors, Give Me Liberty and Visions of Liberty (anthologies for Baen Books)
- 2005: L. Neil Smith (writer) and Scott Bieser (illustrator), The Probability Broach: The Graphic Novel
- 2006: Joss Whedon (writer-director), Serenity
- 2007: James McTeigue (director) and the Wachowskis (screenplay), V for Vendetta (motion picture)
- 2014: Vernor Vinge, Special Prometheus Award for Lifetime Achievement
- 2014: Leslie Fish, Tower of Horses (novella) and "The Horsetamer's Daughter" (song)
- 2015: F. Paul Wilson, Special Prometheus Award for Lifetime Achievement
- 2016: L. Neil Smith, Special Prometheus Award for Lifetime Achievement
- 2016: Jonathan Luna and Sarah Vaughn, Alex + Ada
- 2017: Mark Stanley, Freefall (webcomic)
- 2026: Dave Freer, Special Award for Young Adult Fiction for Storm-Dragon

== See also ==
- Anarcho-capitalist literature
- Libertarianism
