= Repairman Jack (series) =

Horror/thriller novels by F. Paul Wilson

- The Tomb (1984); Nightworld (1992/2012); Legacies (1998); Conspiracies (1999); All the Rage (2000); Hosts (2001); The Haunted Air (2002); Gateways (2003); Crisscross (2004); Infernal (2005); Harbingers (2006); Bloodline (2007); Secret Histories (2008); By the Sword (2008); Ground Zero (2009); Secret Circles (2010); Fatal Error (2010); Secret Vengeance (2011); Dark at the End (2011); Cold City (2012); Dark City (2013); Fear City (2014); The Last Christmas (2019)
- Author: F. Paul Wilson
- Country: United States
- Language: English
- Genre: Thriller, horror, occult detective fiction
- No. of books: 23

Repairman Jack is a book series by American author F. Paul Wilson, which consists of sixteen horror/thriller novels (as of 2012), several standalone short stories, and two spin-off trilogies.

== Story ==
The series revolves around the adventures of a Manhattan-based "urban mercenary" who calls himself Repairman Jack. Jack is a man with no last name or legal status who makes his living "fixing" situations for people who cannot find help elsewhere. His work has not only led him into violent encounters with the criminal underworld, but also into the midst of a behind-the-scenes cosmic battle for Earth between two supernatural forces: one known as the Ally, which is benign towards humanity, and one as the Otherness, which is hostile towards it and generally considered "evil".

== Timeline ==
The series proper begins with The Tomb and ends with Nightworld. However, those two books are also part of another series of novels by Wilson known as The Adversary Cycle. The Repairman Jack series was restarted with Legacies in 1998. This newer series is following chronologically from the events of The Tomb to the events immediately preceding Nightworld.

== Novels ==
=== Repairman Jack ===
- The Tomb (1984)
- Legacies (1998)
- Conspiracies (1999)
- All the Rage (2000)
- Hosts (Oct 12, 2001)
- The Haunted Air (Oct 18, 2002)
- Gateways (Nov 1, 2003)
- Crisscross (Oct 7, 2004)
- Infernal (Oct 20, 2005)
- Harbingers (Sep 19, 2006)
- Bloodline (Sep 18, 2007)
- By the Sword (Oct 14, 2008)
- Ground Zero (Sep 15, 2009)
- The Last Christmas (2019)
- Fatal Error (Oct 12, 2010)
- Dark at the End (Oct 11, 2011)
- Nightworld (1992 - Extensively revised edition: May 22, 2012)

=== Jack: Young Adult Series ===
- Secret Histories (May 27, 2008)
- Secret Circles (Feb 2, 2010)
- Secret Vengeance (Feb 1, 2011)

=== Repairman Jack: The Early Years ===
- Cold City (Nov 27, 2012)
- Dark City (Oct 15, 2013)
- Fear City (Nov 11, 2014)

== Short fiction ==
- "The Wringer" (in Night Screams)
- "A Day in the Life" (in Stalkers + The Barren & Others)
- "The Last Rakosh" (in The World Fantasy Convention 1990 Program Book, integrated into All The Rage)
- "Home Repairs" (in Cold Blood (Ziesing 6/91), integrated into Conspiracies)
- "The Long Way Home" (in Dark at Heart (Dark Harvest 1992))
- "Interlude at Duane's" (in Thriller anthology, 2006)
- "Piney Power" (in Fear: 13 Stories of Suspense and Horror, anthology, 2010)
