= Camber the Heretic =

1981 novel by Katherine Kurtz

- First Edition
- Author: Katherine Kurtz
- Cover artist: Darrell K. Sweet
- Language: English
- Series: The Legends of Camber of Culdi
- Genre: Fantasy
- Publisher: Del Rey Books
- Publication date: 1981
- Publication place: United States
- Media type: Print (hardback & paperback)
- Pages: 491 (first edition, hardcover)
- ISBN: 0-345-33142-7 (first edition, paperback)
- Preceded by: Saint Camber
- Followed by: The Bishop's Heir (next published), The Harrowing of Gwynedd (literary chronology)

Camber the Heretic is a fantasy novel by American-born author Katherine Kurtz. It was first published by Del Rey Books in 1981. It was the sixth novel of Kurtz' Deryni novels to be published, and the third book in her second Deryni trilogy, The Legends of Camber of Culdi. The Legends trilogy serves as prequels to The Chronicles of the Deryni series that Kurtz wrote from 1970 to 1973, and it details the events that occurred two centuries before the Chronicles trilogy. Kurtz' next Deryni series to be published was The Histories of King Kelson, but the internal literary chronology of the Legends trilogy is continued in The Heirs of Saint Camber trilogy.

== Plot introduction ==
The novel is set in the land of Gwynedd, one of the fictional Eleven Kingdoms. Gwynedd itself is a medieval kingdom similar to the British Isles of the 9th century, with a powerful Holy Church (based on the Roman Catholic Church), and a feudal government ruled by a hereditary monarchy. The population of Gwynedd includes both humans and Deryni, a race of people with inherent psychic and magical abilities. The novel takes place in the early ninth century, beginning ten years after the conclusion of Saint Camber. The plot of the novel centers on the desperate efforts of the Deryni to protect their futures from a rising tide of human anger and discrimination. As the health of aging King Cinhil Haldane begins to fail, a small group of powerful Deryni struggle to save their race from the deadly plots of Cinhil's ambitious nobles.

== Plot summary ==
The events of Camber the Heretic span roughly one year, from January 917 to early January 918. The novel begins as the Deryni Healer Rhys Thuryn and his wife, Evaine MacRorie Thuryn, attempt to treat an injured colleague, Earl Gregory of Ebor. While tending to Gregory's wounds, Rhys accidentally discovers an innate ability to block Gregory's Deryni powers. Stunned and amazed by his discovery, Rhys seeks the advice of his father-in-law, Camber MacRorie, the legendary Deryni adept who has been living in the guise of Bishop Alister Cullen for the past decade. Although equally shocked by Rhys' discovery, Camber is unable to provide any insights, and they soon return to Valoret to tend to the king.

King Cinhil Haldane is dying, a fact which deeply concerns Camber and his family. Although Cinhil himself has never truly overcome his distrust of Deryni powers, he has kept the peace between the races throughout his reign, due largely to his close friendship with the man he believes to be Alister Cullen. However, with Cinhil's death fast approaching, Camber realizes that the ambitious human lords at court will soon be able to wage open war on Deryni throughout the kingdom. Prince Alroy Haldane, Cinhil's eldest son and heir, is a sickly twelve-year-old boy, and Camber knows all too well that the Regency Council that will control the throne during Alroy's minority will not treat Deryni kindly.

Despite his misgivings about his own powers, Cinhil is nonetheless forced to admit that some of his powers are extremely beneficial to a king. Accordingly, he asks Father Joram MacRorie, Camber's son, to assist him in a magical ritual to bestow such powers upon his three sons. The following night, Camber, Joram, Rhys, Evaine, and Jebediah d'Alcara perform the ritual with Cinhil, mirroring the same ritual that gave Cinhil his own powers fourteen years earlier. The ritual is successful, but the strain is too much for the ailing king. Cinhil soon collapses and dies, but not before he finally learns the truth about Camber's secret identity.

With Cinhil dead, the human lords waste no time in making their bid for power. At the first meeting of the Regency Council, Camber is quickly removed by his fellow Regents. Additionally, almost all of the Deryni members of the Royal Council are forced to resign. Only Archbishop Jaffray is spared, as the Archbishop of Valoret is entitled to serve on the council for life. As the Deryni at court begin to make new lives for themselves, the Camberian Council discusses Rhys' discovery. Fearful of the persecutions that will soon be coming against Deryni throughout Gwynedd, Camber suggests a desperate plan to save some of their people. By blocking their powers under the guise of a religious blessing, some Deryni may escape the persecutions by living as normal humans.

Conditions continue to deteriorate for Deryni after Alroy's coronation as king. Prince Javan Haldane's personal Healer, Lord Tavis O'Neill, is attacked and mutilated by a group of Deryni for serving the human prince. An attempt to infiltrate the royal court ends in disaster when Earl Davin MacRorie of Culdi, Camber's grandson, is slain while defending the king's brothers. The Michaelines, a militant religious order with many Deryni members, finally decide to leave Gwynedd completely, and many other Deryni flee the increasingly hostile kingdom. Additionally, Tavis and Javan begin to remember details of the night of Cinhil's death, spurring their curiosity to discover the whole truth of the night's actions. Finally, in late October, Archbishop Jaffray is killed in an anti-Deryni uprising.

The Curia of Bishops meets in Valoret to choose Jaffray's successor. The Regents make no secret that they want Bishop Hubert MacInnis to be elected, and they actively campaign for his selection. Nonetheless, many of the bishops refuse to vote for Hubert, and the deadlocked Curia is unable to choose a new primate. Finally, a group of bishops approaches Camber and asks him to accept their nomination. Although initially unwilling to accept, Camber eventually agrees to their proposal. After his election the following day, Hubert and the other Regents erupt with rage. They order their forces to attack several prominent Deryni religious houses, but Camber and Joram are unable to warn the houses in time. Meanwhile, Tavis summons Rhys to attend to Javan, then drugs him to read his memories of Cinhil's death. In doing so, Tavis discovers that he also has the ability to block Deryni powers.

On Christmas Day of 917, Camber, as Alister Cullen, is enthroned as Archbishop of Valoret and Primate of All Gwynedd. Rhys convinces Tavis to release him, and immediately attempts to warn Camber that the Regents are planning to attack the cathedral itself. A tense stand-off between the bishops and the Regents results in a bloody confrontation as the Regents attempt to arrest the assembled clerics. Although Camber and many of his allies manage to escape, Rhys does not survive the incident and soon dies in Camber's arms.

Having routed the Deryni, the Regents immediately move to press their advantage. Hubert is soon elected Archbishop, and the Regents embark on a ruthless campaign of Deryni suppression. New laws and religious doctrines are quickly passed, forbidding Deryni from holding land or office and banning Deryni from the priesthood. The lands of Deryni nobles are savagely attacked, their people murdered and their estates burned. Camber's sainthood is not only revoked, but the supposedly dead Deryni lord is declared to be a heretic. Additionally, all members of Camber's family are outlawed and sentenced to death.

While attempting to flee to safety, Evaine is stunned by the feeling of Rhys' death. Accompanied by her nephew, Ansel MacRorie, she travels to Trurill to retrieve her eldest son. However, the Regents' forces have reached the castle first, and Evaine and Ansel discover a scene of barbarous destruction. The castle is burned and nearly all the occupants are dead, including Evaine's son. The deaths of her husband and her son send Evaine into premature labor and she soon gives birth to her second daughter, Jerusha. Nonetheless, Evaine and Ansel manage to evade pursuit and reach safety.

Shortly after the beginning of the new year, Camber and Jebediah travel to rendezvous with Evaine, Ansel and Joram. Despite their attempts to remain incognito, they are recognized by several of the Regents' men, who soon attempt to capture the pair. Camber and Jebediah are sorely wounded in the fight, and Jebediah quickly succumbs to his injuries. As he lies bleeding in the snow, Camber ponders his past and his powers, remembering a dangerous spell that may enable him to elude death once again. Weakened and dying, he decides to cast one final spell. Later, as Evaine and Joram gaze at the body of their father, they notice the odd shape of his hands, and they wonder aloud if there might still be a way for Camber MacRorie to live.

== Characters ==
- Camber MacRorie: Patron Saint of Deryni Magic and Defender of Mankind, believed killed in 905 and canonized in 906, disguised as Alister Cullen since 905
  - Bishop Alister Cullen: Bishop of Grecotha, Chancellor of Gwynedd, Lord Regent of Gwynedd, member of the Camberian Council, public identity of Camber MacRorie
- Father Joram MacRorie: Michaeline priest and knight, son of Camber MacRorie, member of the Camberian Council
- Lord Rhys Thuryn: Court Healer, husband of Evaine MacRorie, member of the Camberian Council
- Lady Evaine MacRorie Thuryn: daughter of Camber MacRorie, wife of Rhys Thuryn, member of the Camberian Council
- King Cinhil Haldane: King of Gwynedd
- Prince Alroy Haldane: Prince of Gwynedd, eldest son and heir of King Cinhil, elder twin of Prince Javan
- Prince Javan Haldane: Prince of Gwynedd, second son of King Cinhil, younger twin of Prince Alroy
- Prince Rhys Michael Haldane: Prince of Gwynedd, youngest son of King Cinhil
- Lord Jebediah d'Alcara: Grand Master of the Michaelines and Earl Marshal of Gwynedd
- Lord Tavis O'Neill: personal Healer of Prince Javan
- Earl Gregory MacDinan: Earl of Ebor, member of the Camberian Council
- Archbishop Jaffray: Archbishop of Valoret and Primate of All Gwynedd, member of the Camberian Council
- Earl Davin MacRorie: Earl of Culdi, grandson of Camber MacRorie, elder brother of Ansel MacRorie
- Lord Ansel MacRorie: grandson of Camber MacRorie, younger brother of Davin MacRorie
- Dom Queron Kinevan: former Gabrilite priest and Healer, founder of the Servants of Saint Camber
- Bishop Hubert MacInnis: Auxiliary Bishop of Rhemuth, Lord Regent of Gwynedd, brother of Manfred MacInnis
- Earl Tammaron Fitz-Arthur: Lord Regent of Gwynedd
- Earl Murdoch: Earl of Carthane and Lord Regent of Gwynedd
- Baron Manfred MacInnis: Baron of Marlor, brother of Hubert MacInnis
- Baron Rhun von Horthy: Baron of Horthness and Lord Regent of Gwynedd

== Awards and nominations ==
In 1982, Camber the Heretic was ranked 6th in an annual poll of fantasy novels by Locus magazine readers, placing it between Robert Stallman's The Captive and F. Paul Wilson's The Keep. The poll was won by Gene Wolfe's The Claw of the Conciliator. At the time, it was the highest ranking for a Deryni novel in the annual poll, though Kurtz' The King's Justice would later rank sixth in the 1986 poll.

At Fool*Con V, a science fiction and fantasy convention held in Kansas City in April 1982, the fans selected Camber the Heretic as the winner of the coveted Balrog Award for fantasy novels. The other finalists for the award were Piers Anthony's Centaur Island, Stephen King's Cujo, F. Paul Wilson's The Keep, and John Crowley's Little, Big.

== Release details ==
- 1981, USA, Ballantine Books, Hardcover
- 1985, USA, Del Rey Books ISBN 0-345-33142-7, Pub date 12 September 1985, Paperback
- 1986, UK, Century Publishing ISBN 0-09-948090-5, Paperback
