= Repairman Jack =

Fictional character by F. Paul Wilson

- First appearance: The Tomb
- Last appearance: The Last Christmas
- Created by: F. Paul Wilson

In-universe information
- Gender: Male

Repairman Jack is a fictional character in a series of novels by F. Paul Wilson. The novels are "realistic" in tone and thriller-like, while dealing with the supernatural. It is technically a spin-off branch of the larger, overarching supernatural horror series, The Adversary Cycle.

== Overview ==
Repairman Jack is a self-described "fix-it" man, but not in the common workshop sense. He is something of an underground mercenary, hired by everyday people to fix situations that cannot be dealt with through legal means (e.g. by blackmail). He is careful about who he agrees to do fix-its for, preferring innocent, desperate citizens being victimized with no one else to turn to. Jack adamantly refuses to take murder for hire jobs and almost never becomes involved in cases involving domestic issues between couples, kidnappings or missing persons as he believes officialdom, Jack's personal name for society norms such as the police, is the best option in those situations given their superior resources. These fix-its usually begin simply, but grow into complex problems that begin to involve more and more science-fiction and supernatural elements as the novels continue. The second novel, Legacies, is the only one that is completely free of any overtly supernatural elements.

All of Jack's fix-its are immediately relevant problems in today's world, covering topics such as conspiracy groups, grassroots movements, designer drugs, public shootings, terrorists, legal dealings, and scientific and biological experiments. Jack relies on his brain, wits, experience, and real-life weapons and techniques to do battle, and though he makes increasing use of supernatural sources of information (a spiritual medium), he has so far not used supernatural weapons or abilities in battle.

Jack hides his identity from the government and does his best to not leave behind traces of his identity when out and about. He advertises his services strictly by word of mouth and via an anonymous website.

== Personal life ==
Jack has two older siblings, and over the course of the novels a complex family history is revealed, along with a larger agenda that involves every member of his family. He has a girlfriend with a young daughter, to whom he gives undying loyalty. Jack's best friend is an arms dealer and information specialist, and his other good friend runs a bar that Jack often uses as a checkpoint to meet with potential customers.

== Appearance and personality ==
Jack is a man who carefully keeps himself outside of what he terms "officialdom", refusing to enter the workforce (and claims to have no U.S. Social Security number). Because of this and the fact that he has earned many enemies over the years, his physical appearance embodies the word "average": he is of average height, average build, with brown hair and eyes. Jack's entire outward appearance is cultivated so that he does not draw attention to himself as he's often described as not being the least bit memorable or someone who would not be looked at twice, which is invaluable to him in most of his various fix-it jobs. He is physically fit but not obviously so as his exercise routine consists of a daily routine of rigorous calisthenics; a confident fighter and skilled with guns. Jack has also shown himself to be a capable actor, having successfully portrayed himself in various roles during his fix-it jobs such as an upscale realtor, a reclusive multi-millionaire and a lowlife thug.

Jack is prone to fits of righteous anger in which he will dive into situations rashly, though luck, skill and creative improvisation usually serve him well. Jack prefers to handle his fix-its with cunning and finesse with how he fulfils his customer's request as a matter of personal pride.

Though he generally keeps to himself, Jack is fiercely loyal to and protective of his loved ones. His need to protect his family is what drives much of his actions later in the series, along with an innate sense of righteousness. He enjoys playing mind games with con artists and criminals, and has a wry and sometimes dark sense of humor. Jack can also be described as vengeful and cold-blooded under certain circumstances; he often is indifferent to killing those he deems deserving of death.

== Motivation ==
Jack performed his first "fix-it" as a teenager. A vandal continually destroyed his neighbor's lawn with his car, and he offered his services not only in repairing the damage, but ensuring that it would not recur. Upon agreeing payment, Jack hid a series of reinforced metal spikes in a hedge surrounding the yard, which destroyed the tires and engine of the vandal's car when he again attempted to destroy the lawn. This would describe most of Jack's "fix-its"—simple yet elegant plans that turned the destructive actions of others upon themselves.

When he was in college, Jack's mother was murdered in front of him and his father when a cinder block was thrown off of a bridge through the front window of their car. This compelled Jack to perform his first self-employed fix-it; investigating the murder after police dismissed the crime as unsolvable. Jack eventually found the culprit, a vandal who Jack not only witnesses preparing to throw another cinder block off the bridge, but boasts of having performed the act on the same day and in the same location as the murder.

The culprit is thus identified to Jack's satisfaction, but Jack is left with a quandary; the crime remains unprosecutable due to lack of reproducible evidence, i.e. the spoken confession. Jack thus chooses to disable the vandal, reveal himself as the son of the woman he murdered with the cinder block, then suspend him from the underside of the bridge in a position where he will not be visible, at a height where his body will be repeatedly struck by passing semi trailers but not their cabs. The vandal's body is not found until smears of blood are found on the trailers far from the bridge and traced back to the bridge.

Though he never feels any guilt for his first act as a vigilante, he still felt transformed by it, to the point where he decided that he had no place in his old world. He dropped out and left "officialdom", entering his underground lifestyle in New York where he almost completely severs ties with family and friends, except for very rare telephone calls and even rarer personal visits to his father.

== Series plot ==
Jack lives in what appears to be the normal modern city of New York; he gets involved in many "mundane" fix-its where he deals with gangsters, criminals, cults, con artists and kidnappers, but he also runs into supernatural creatures and beings that are often tied to the illegal dealings.

Typically, Jack gets involved in multiple fix-its in each novel, usually one of those turning into a large issue that leads him to use his skills to battle supernatural forces. Jack also begins to find his loved ones threatened by these forces, and while he struggles to maintain some control over his life, he is also faced with internal challenges, such as facing the possibility of having to give up his entire adult lifestyle.

As the series progresses, the appearance of supernatural beings and situations lead Jack to become entangled in a larger, universal fight. While he protests his involvement, he is dragged deeper with each novel into growing unrest and chaos—the observable effects of a cosmic battle for all existence. The two major forces involved are called (by their earthly agents) the Ally and the Otherness. The Ally "collects" worlds as souvenirs, the Otherness "consumes" worlds as a predator. The conflict is thus not so much a matter of "good and evil" as "indifferent and inimical".

It is stressed repeatedly in the novels that though both forces require control over all of existence, the value of individual worlds is negligible—but it is also stated that Earth is of greater-than-average value as it is a world containing sentient life. Sentience is rare, making this world more attractive to the Ally—much like a stone with a distinct shape or pattern. The Otherness (and its agents) derive sustenance from destruction and thus finds sentient life useful as it can be guided to destroy its surroundings and itself—like self-slaughtering cattle. This is the reason the indifferent force has been dubbed the Ally—but this definition extends to humans only so long as they serve its ends.

The Otherness has a powerful champion dubbed the Adversary—an evil magician once known as Rasalom. Ages past, Rasalom made a deal with the Otherness; in exchange for power and eternal life, he would lead the Otherness's minions—malevolent supernatural entities—in its campaign against the Ally. Jack has met him several times, each time barely surviving the experience.

The Ally once had a corresponding champion dubbed the Sentinel—a warrior known as Glaeken. Soon after Rasalom was empowered, Glaeken was given a magical sword that strengthened and healed him while weakening and harming agents of the Otherness. Thus empowered, he was directed to lead the Yeniçeri—orphaned children raised to fight in the Ally's cause—against Rasalom. At some point more than 1000 years ago, Glaeken became estranged from the Yeniçeri and left them to their own devices.

The battles between the Adversary and the Sentinel continued—to the point of Glaeken temporarily slaying Rasalom multiple times—finally, Glaeken succeeded in overpowering him approximately a thousand years ago. However, Glaeken had grown to enjoy his agelessness, and knew that it would end with Rasalom's death. He thus sealed him in a keep in the Carpathian Mountains by use of the sword's hilt. This imprisonment came to an end during the events of The Keep; Rasalom was (seemingly) destroyed along with the sword and Glaeken began to age as a human. Glaeken has since been aging normally since the late 1940s and is now an old man.

However, Rasalom's demise was purely temporary—he was able to resurrect himself during the events of Reborn in the late 1960s. Shortly thereafter, a pair of superhuman beings known as "The Twins" (responsible for the worldwide sightings of men in black) took leadership over the Yeniçeri. Since his rebirth, Rasalom has been keeping a low profile so as not to attract the attention of Glaeken, The Twins or the Yeniçeri.

In modern times, Jack has found himself chosen, against his knowledge and will, to represent the Ally. The phrase, "a spear has no branches" is applied to him often, as the Ally attempts to hone him into a lone, hardened warrior by killing those he has emotional attachments to. He later finds out the Ally has specified him as the second in line of the Ally's forces. The Twins have been destroyed by the Otherness and the Ally's original champion Glaeken, nicknamed the Sentinel, is old and failing. At this point, Jack is known as the Heir, because should Glaeken die, Jack will become the Ally's new champion—or leave Earth defenseless. The Nightworld series, parent to the Repairman Jack series, already names Jack as a main fighter in the cosmic war.

Several novels in, it is revealed that a third force in the power struggle has been making its presence known through various representatives: The Lady, seemingly a series of different women with nothing in common save strange canine companions and oracular knowledge. The force the Lady and her dog represents is unclear at first, but she dislikes both the Otherness and the Ally. However, as she is openly sympathetic and helpful to Jack, her agenda tends to parallel that of the Ally, though she, like Jack, wishes neither force were present. She can see into the future and command certain superhuman powers. The force she represents appears not to be as powerful as either the Otherness or the Ally: she cannot drive out the Otherness and various forms of hers can be killed by Otherness creatures (though seem immune to any earthly danger), and she cannot over-ride or over-rule the Ally. Rasalom knows her as The Lady, and initially appears to fear her. It was first speculated that The Lady is a representation of "Mother Earth", because she repeatedly calls herself Jack's and other people's "Mother". Also, when an agent of the Otherness was burying supernaturally dark artifacts across the globe, all her forms simultaneously showed a pattern of scarring that mapped the artifacts' locations. Another clue was that her yard, in the midst of a ban on watering, was incredibly lush and verdant. A final clue was that she at one point called herself Herta, an anagram for Earth. In Ground Zero, however, she reveals that this was misleading, and she is in fact the physical manifestation of the noosphere: the emergence of sentience. She, and her dog, are a living (and semi-immortal) beacon proclaiming that Earth is sentient. Should she be extinguished, the Ally will lose interest in the Earth.

In Bloodline, Jack discovers he may be more closely linked to the Otherness than he had previously realized—a scion of an ancient and powerful bloodline with a proven potential for violent conflict. It remains to be seen if Jack will have new abilities bestowed upon him at some point to level the playing ground, or if he will continue to remain a character firmly rooted in the "real world".

In the novel, By The Sword, the cycle is nearing completion as the early events of Nightworld are re-introduced; Jack meets Glaeken for the first time, and the confrontation with The Adversary is drawing near.

== Future of Repairman Jack ==
There has been tentative news of a Repairman Jack movie based on the first novel (The Tomb, or Rakoshi). Plot setting and elements of the original plot most likely will be altered due to filming location.

A trilogy of young adult novels about Jack's teenage years has come out. They do not change the events of the adult Jack's life, but will perhaps elaborate on hints about his past that Jack has dropped in the novels so far. The first, published in 2008, is titled Secret Histories. The second was published in February 2010 and is titled Secret Circles. The final novel in the trilogy, Secret Vengeance, came out in February 2011.

This trilogy finally puts in print Wilson's stated connection between his supernatural and science fiction via the character of Jack's "Uncle Gurney", the protagonist of his drug-war satire short story "Lipidleggin'", and the ancestor of far-future economic revolutionary Peter LaNague.

Wilson, in early 2011, signed a contract to write an additional Repairman Jack trilogy after the completion of the main story arc with The Dark at the End and the heavily revised Nightworld. The new trilogy focuses on the time period immediately following Jack's relocation to New York City. The first book, entitled Cold City, was published in November 2012. The second novel, entitled Dark City, came out in October 2013. The third entry in this last trilogy, entitled Fear City, was released in November 2014.

In 2019, Wilson published another Repairman Jack novel entitled "The Last Christmas" which takes place after the events of "Ground Zero" but before the events of "Fatal Error."

== Novels and stories ==
=== Main ===
- The Tomb (1984; re-released in 1998 with updated cultural references, and again in 2004 in a limited edition under its original title, Rakoshi, by Borderlands Press)
- Legacies (1998)
- Conspiracies (1999)
- All the Rage (2000)
- Hosts (2001)
- The Haunted Air (2002)
- Gateways (2003)
- Crisscross (2004)
- Infernal (2005)
- Harbingers (2006)
- Bloodline (2007)
- By the Sword (2008)
- Ground Zero (2009)
- Fatal Error (2010)
- The Dark at the End (2011)
- Nightworld (1992, though his appearance here happens after all others—updated Borderlands Press edition released in June '06 and a fully revised edition capping off the Repairman Jack and Adversary Cycle series in May 2012)
- Quick Fixes: Tales of Repairman Jack (2012, containing all short stories containing the character)
- The Last Christmas (2019, an interlude that takes place between the events of Ground Zero and Fatal Error.)

=== Young Adult prequel novellas ===
- Jack: Secret Histories (2008)
- Secret Circles (2009)
- Secret Vengeance (2011)

=== Early Repairman Jack Trilogy ===
- Cold City (November 2012)
- Dark City (October 2013)
- Fear City (June 2014)

==== Repairman Jack stories in anthologies ====
- "The Wringer", Night Screams (1996)
- "Day in the Life", The Barrens and Others (1998)
- "Interlude at Duane's", Thriller (2006)
- "Infernal Night", FaceOff (2014), crossover story between Repairman Jack and Heather Graham's Michael Quinn

=== Other ===
- In January 2012 F. Paul Wilson began writing for the tech web site Byte, mostly in the persona of Repairman Jack.
