= Legacies (novel) =

1998 novel by F. Paul Wilson

- First edition (UK)
- Author: F. Paul Wilson
- Cover artist: Chris Moore
- Language: English
- Series: The Repairman Jack Series
- Publisher: Headline (UK); Forge Books (US)
- Publication date: February 1998
- Publication place: United States
- Media type: Print (Hardcover and Paperback)
- Pages: 278 pp
- ISBN: 0-7472-1703-3
- OCLC: 38504472
- Dewey Decimal: 813/.54 21
- LC Class: PS3573.I45695 L44 1998
- Preceded by: The Tomb
- Followed by: Conspiracies

Legacies is the second volume in a series of Repairman Jack books written by American author F. Paul Wilson. The book was first published in 1998 by Headline in England (February) and by Forge Books in the US (August).

== Reception ==
F&SF reviewer Charles de Lint, noting similarities to the Burke novels of Andrew Vachss, described Legacies as the rare sequel "standing as strong as the original work."
