= The Keep (board game) =

1983 board game

The Keep is a board game published by Mayfair Games in 1983 that is based on the identically titled 1983 horror film.

== Description ==
The Keep is a game for 3 to 6 players, in which one player takes the role of the evil Molasar, while the others are a band of adventurers. Only one weapon, hidden somewhere on the board, can kill Molasar, and the adventurers must find it. Molasar sends out his ten Nazi minions, trying to kill the adventurers before they can locate the weapon. If an adventurer succeeds in finding the weapon and confronting Molasar, the game is over and the player wielding the weapon is the winner. Each turn, Molasar must eat one of his minions, gradually reducing his ability to kill adventurers. However, if Molasar eats the final Nazi minion in Turn 12, he gains superhuman strength and destroys the world -- the game is over and Molasar is the winner.

== Publication history ==
In 1981, William Morrow published The Keep, a horror novel by F. Paul Wilson. The novel was turned into a film in 1983 (with a soundtrack by Tangerine Dream), and a board game designed by James D. Griffin was published by Mayfair Games, also in 1983.

Licensed board games published by Mayfair Games in the early history of the company include The Company War, The Forever War, The Keep, Dragonriders of Pern, and Hammer's Slammers.

== Reception ==
Andy Blakeman reviewed The Keep for Imagine magazine, and stated that "The game is well balanced, and usually builds up to an exciting climax (the outcome rarely looks certain), and is enjoyable because of this. However, the levels of bluff and counterbluff make it very much better, as you try to out-think your opponents."

== Reviews ==
- Games #54
- Analog Science Fiction and Fact

== Other recognition ==
A copy of The Keep is held in the collection of the Brian Sutton-Smith Library and Archives of Play at the Strong National Museum of Play (Box 31, Folder 49).
