= Sarah A. Hoyt =

American novelist (born 1962)

- Born: Sarah D'Almeida; November 18, 1962 (age 63); Granja, Águas Santas, Maia near Porto, Portugal
- Occupation: Writer
- Writing career
- Pen name: Sarah D'Almeida; Elise Hyatt; Sarah Marques; Laurien Gardner; Sarah Marques de Almeida Hoyt
- Period: 1997–present
- Genres: Science fiction; Fantasy; Mystery; Historical fiction
- Notable awards: Prometheus Award (2011); Dragon Award (2018)
- Website: www.sarahahoyt.com

Sarah A. Hoyt (born November 18, 1962) is a Portuguese-born American immigrant science fiction, fantasy, mystery, and historical fiction writer. She won the 2011 Prometheus Award for Best Libertarian SF Novel for her science fiction novel Darkship Thieves, and the 2018 Dragon Award for Best Alternate History Novel for Uncharted, which she co-authored with Kevin J. Anderson. She has written under the noms de plume Sarah D'Almeida, Elise Hyatt, Sarah Marques, Laurien Gardner, and Sarah Marques de Almeida Hoyt. She was the leader of the Sad Puppies campaign in the year that it ceased nominating candidates.

== Biography ==
Sarah de Almeida was born on November 18, 1962, in the village of Granja, Águas Santas, Maia and grew up in Porto, Portugal. Educated in both Portugal and the United States, she graduated from University of Porto, with a Master's equivalent in Modern Languages and Literatures with a major in English and a minor in German. She also speaks Swedish, Italian and French, with varying degrees of fluency. Married in 1985 to Dan Hoyt (a science fiction author and mathematician), she has two sons. She became a United States citizen in 1988 in Charlotte, North Carolina.

== Writing ==
Hoyt says "no genre is safe from me". She has more than 30 novels in science fiction, fantasy, mystery, and historical. The first book in her Shakespearean fantasy series, Ill Met by Moonlight was a finalist for the 2002 Mythopoeic Fantasy Award.

Her Musketeers series begins with Death of a Musketeer, a Mystery Book Club selection, and includes three other titles from Berkley Prime Crime.

Her favorite genre, however, remains science fiction, and Hoyt is a prolific writer. Her short stories are in Analog, Asimov's, Weird Tales, and anthologies from DAW and Baen. Her shapeshifter series include Draw One in the Dark and Gentleman Takes a Chance, urban fantasy adventures, from Baen Books. Also from Baen Books is her Darkship series beginning with Darkship Thieves, winner of the Prometheus Award for libertarian science fiction.

The British Empire series takes place in a parallel world, where history from Charlemagne to Queen Victoria parallels ours but is actuated through the workings of magic and not by science and technology. The series consists of three books: Heart of Light, set in Victorian Africa; Soul of Fire unfolds in India; and Heart and Soul in the chaos of 19th century China.

Under the house name Laurien Gardner, she has Plain Jane for Jove Books Historical Fiction. She also edited the anthology Something Magic This Way Comes.

She has a series of mysteries centered on furniture re-finishing under the pen name Elise Hyatt. These stories are set in the same city of Goldport, Colorado as her shifter series, with some characters appearing in both series.

Her novel Uncharted with Kevin J. Anderson won the Dragon Awards for Best Alternate History Novel in 2018. A review in Locus described it as "filled with not only slambang adventures but also a kind of rational optimism... rare in genre works these days."

More recently, she was featured on a podcast, The Future and You. Produced by Stephen Euin Cobb, the show featured Sarah de Almeida Hoyt, David Drake, Alan Dean Foster, Travis Taylor, and Stephen L Antczak. She was Guest of Honor at the 2019 LibertyCon.

Hoyt is a regular contributor to the Instapundit blog and The Libertarian Enterprise (ncc-1776.org).

== Bibliography ==
All works released under the name "Sarah A. Hoyt" unless otherwise noted. Series are listed alphabetically.

=== Arcane America series ===
1. Uncharted with Kevin J. Anderson (Baen, May 2018, ISBN 978-1-4814-8323-0)

=== Darkship series ===
1. Darkship Thieves (Baen, January 2010, ISBN 978-1-4391-3317-0)
2. Darkship Renegades (Baen, December 2012, ISBN 978-1-4516-3852-3)
3. A Few Good Men (Baen, March 2013, ISBN 978-1-4516-3888-2)
4. Through Fire (Baen, May 2016, ISBN 978-1-62579-496-3)
5. Darkship Revenge (Baen, May 2017, ISBN 978-1-4767-8192-1)

=== Furniture Refinishing series ===
Works in this mystery series were released under "Elise Hyatt".

1. Dipped, Stripped, and Dead (Berkley, October 2009, ISBN 9780425230787)
2. French Polished Murder (Berkley, May 2010, ISBN 9780425233467)
3. A Fatal Stain (Berkley, October 2012, ISBN 978-0425255230)

=== Magical British Empire series ===
1. Heart of Light (Bantam Spectra, February 2008, ISBN 978-0-553-58966-5)
2. Soul of Fire (Bantam Spectra, July 2008, ISBN 978-0-553-58967-2)
3. Heart and Soul (Bantam Spectra, October 2008, ISBN 978-0-553-58968-9)

=== Magical Empires series ===
- Witchfinder (Goldport Press, April 2014, ISBN 978-1-63011-015-4)

=== Monster Hunter International series ===
- Monster Hunter Guardian with Larry Correia (Baen, August 2019, ISBN 978-1-4814-8414-5)

=== Musketeers series ===
Works in the Three Musketeers series were released under "Sarah D'Almeida".

1. Death of a Musketeer (Berkley Prime Crime, November 2006, ISBN 0-425-21292-0)
2. The Musketeer's Seamstress (Berkley Prime Crime, April 2007, ISBN 978-0-425-21489-3)
3. The Musketeer's Apprentice (Berkley Prime Crime, September 2007, ISBN 978-0-425-21769-6)
4. A Death in Gascony (Berkley Prime Crime, April 2008, ISBN 978-0-425-22101-3)
5. Dying by the Sword (Berkley, December 2008, ISBN 978-0-425-22461-8)

=== Shakespearean Fantasy series ===
1. Ill Met by Moonlight (Ace, October 2001, ISBN 0-441-00860-7)
2. All Night Awake (Ace, October 2002, ISBN 0-441-00973-5)
3. Any Man So Daring (Ace, November 2003, ISBN 0-441-01092-X)

=== Shifter series ===
1. Draw One in the Dark (Baen, November 2006, ISBN 1-4165-2092-9)
2. Gentleman Takes a Chance (Baen, October 2008, ISBN 978-1-4165-5593-3)
3. Noah's Boy (Baen, July 2013, ISBN 978-1-4516-3904-9)
4. Bowl of Red (Goldport Press, October 2021, ASIN B0BBPS1HWB)
- Night Shifters (omnibus edition of Draw One in the Dark and Gentleman Takes a Chance) (Baen, June 2014, ISBN 978-1-4767-3651-8)

=== Vampire Musketeers series ===
Works in this series were released under "Sarah Marques".

1. Sword & Blood (Prime Books, April 2012, ISBN 978-1-60701-351-8)
2. Royal Blood (Prime Books, October 2012, ISBN 978-1-60701-363-1)

=== Historical romance ===
- Plain Jane (as Laurien Gardner) (Jove Books Historical Fiction, July 2008, ISBN 978-0425220948)
- No Will But His: A Novel of Kathryn Howard (Berkley, April 2010, ISBN 978-0-425-23251-4)

=== Other novels ===
- A Touch of Night: Pride, Prejudice and Dragons with Sofie Skapski (Naked Reader Press, August 2010, ISBN 978-1-61136-001-1)

=== Anthologies ===
- Something Magic This Way Comes with Martin H. Greenberg (DAW, March 2003, ISBN 075640472X)

=== Short story collections ===
- Crawling Between Heaven and Earth (Dark Regions, September 2002, ISBN 1-888993-29-4). Contains the following new stories:
  - "Ariadne's Skein"
  - "Crawling Between Heaven and Earth"
  - "The Green Bay Tree"
  - "Thy Vain Worlds"
- Wings (Dark Regions, May 2008, ISBN 978-1-888993-60-8, ebook ASIN B00E91QT4C)
- Here Be Dragons (Goldport Press, May 2015, ebook only)
- Dragon Blood (Goldport Press, October 2016, ISBN 978-1-63011-020-8)
- So Little and So Light (Goldport Press, July 2018, ebook only)

=== Short stories ===
- "Thirst" (as by Sarah Marques de Almeida Hoyt) in Bloodsongs #4 (Bambada Press, Autumn 1995)
- "Plaudit Cives" in Absolute Magnitude, Summer 1998 (DNA Publications)
- "Not for Thee the Glow" in Pirate Writings #18 (DNA Publications, Summer 1999)
- "Like Dreams of Waking" in Dark Regions/Horror Magazine, Summer 1999 (Dark Regions Press)
- "Elvis Died for Your Sins" in Weird Tales, Spring 2000 (DNA Publications, April 2000)
- "If I Lose Thee..." with Rebecca Lickiss in Star Trek: Strange New Worlds III (Pocket Books, May 2000, ISBN 0-671-03652-1), Grand Prize Winner
- "Another George" in Dark Regions #15 (Dark Regions Press, Winter/Spring 2000)
- "Songs" in Weird Tales, Spring 2001 (DNA Publications/Terminus)
- "Dear John" in Absolute Magnitude, Summer 2001 (DNA Publications)
- "The Blood Like Wine" in Dreams of Decadence #15 (DNA Publications, Autumn 2001)
- "Trafalgar Square" in Analog, November 2001 (Dell Magazines)
- "The Play and the Thing" in Fantastic Stories of the Imagination #22 (DNA Publications, Winter 2001)
- "For Whose Dear Sake" in Dreams of Decadence #17 (DNA Publications, Summer 2002)
- "The Muse's Darling" in Apprentice Fantastic (DAW, November 2002, ISBN 0-7564-0093-7)
- "Never Look Back" in Weird Tales, Winter 2002 (DNA Publications/Terminus)
- "Traveling, Traveling" in Analog, July/August 2003 (Dell Magazines)
- "The Blonde" in Book of Final Flesh (Eden Studios, July 15, 2003, ISBN 1-891153-78-1)
- "The Play Is the Thing" in The DNA Helix (DNA Publications/Wildside Press, July 2003, ISBN 1-59224-197-2)
- "Wings" in Paradox #3 (Paradox Publications, Autumn 2003)
- "What She Left Behind" in Asimov's, March 2004 (Dell Magazines)
- "Yellow Tide Foam" in Faerie Tales (DAW, May 2004, ISBN 0-7564-0182-8)
- "Ganymede" in Oceans of the Mind #12 (Trantor Publications, Summer 2004)
- "After the Sabines" in Amazing Stories, March 2005 (Paizo Publishing)
- "Eighty Letters, Plus One" with Kevin J. Anderson in The Mammoth Book of New Jules Verne Adventures (Carroll & Graf, March 2005, ISBN 0-7867-1495-6)
- "Sugarbush Soul" in Absolute Magnitude, Spring 2005 (DNA Publications)
- "Wait Until the War Is Over" in Gateways (DAW, June 2005, ISBN 0-7564-0285-9)
- "Sea of Darkness" in The Mammoth Book of Historical Whodunnits, Volume 3 (Constable & Robinson, June 2005, ISBN 978-1845290047)
- "Unnatural History" in Bedlam's Edge (Baen, August 2005, ISBN 1-4165-0893-7)
- "Fox Fire" in Illuminated Manuscripts (Double Dragon eBooks, August 2005, ebook only)
- "Something Worse Hereafter" in All Hell Breaking Loose (DAW, October 2005, ISBN 0-7564-0289-1)
- "Touch" in Fantastic Stories of the Imagination #26 (DNA Publications, October 2005)
- "Super Lamb Banana" in Time After Time (DAW, November 2005, ISBN 0-7564-0310-3)
- "A Change of Heart" with Kate Paulk in Crossroads and Other Tales of Valdemar (DAW, December 2005, ISBN 0-7564-0325-1)
- "Go Tell the Spartans" in Millennium 3001 (DAW, February 2006, ISBN 0-7564-0322-7)
- "Stock Management" in Modern Magic (Fantasist Enterprises, April 2006, ISBN 0-9713608-4-7)
- "Hot" in Slipstreams (DAW, May 2006, ISBN 0-7564-0357-X)
- "Titan" in Children of Magic (DAW, June 2006, ISBN 0-7564-0361-8)
- "Girl With the Golden Lute" in Weird Tales, May/June 2006 (Wildside Press / Terminus)
- "With Unconfined Wings" in Cosmic Cocktails (DAW, December 2006, ISBN 0-7564-0398-7)
- "The Blood of Dreams" in The Secret History of Vampires (DAW, April 2007, ISBN 978-0-7564-0410-9)
- "Where Horse and Hero Fell" in Places to Be, People to Kill (DAW, June 2007, ISBN 978-0-7564-0417-8)
- "But World Enough" in Fate Fantastic (DAW, October 2007, ISBN 978-0-7564-0440-6)
- "Waiting for Juliette" in The Future We Wish We Had (DAW, December 2007, ISBN 978-0-7564-0441-3)
- "Whom the Gods Love" in Transhuman: On the Edge of the Singularity (Baen, February 2008, ISBN 978-1-4165-5523-0)
- "Scraps of Fog" in Jim Baen's Universe, April 2008 (Baen)
- "Heart's Fire" in Enchantment Place (DAW, August 2008, ISBN 978-0-7564-0510-6)
- "The Price of Gold" in Witch High (DAW, October 2008, ISBN 978-0-7564-0513-7)
- "A Grain of Salt" in Better Off Undead (DAW, November 2008, ISBN 978-0-7564-0512-0)
- "Heart, Home and Hearth" with Kate Paulk in Moving Targets and Other Tales of Valdemar (DAW, December 2008, ISBN 978-0-7564-0528-1)
- "Bit the Hand" in Space Sirens (Flying Pen Press, February 2009, ISBN 978-0-9818957-3-4)
- "The Incident of the Inferno Grill" in Witch Way to the Mall (Baen, June 2009, ISBN 978-1-4391-3274-6)
- "Created He Them" in Intelligent Design (DAW, September 2009, ISBN 978-0-7564-0568-7)
- "The Case of the Driving Poodle" in Strip Mauled (Baen, October 2009, ISBN 978-1-4391-3320-0)
- "Matters of the Heart" in Changing the World: All-New Tales of Valdemar (DAW, December 2009, ISBN 978-0-7564-0580-9)
- "In the Absence of Light" in Space Horrors (Flying Pen Press, October 2010, ISBN 978-0-9818957-6-5)
- "A Matter of Blood" in Fangs for the Mammaries (Baen, October 2010, ISBN 978-1-4391-3392-7)
- "Heart's Own" in Finding the Way and Other Tales of Valdemar (DAW, December 2010, ISBN 978-0-7564-0633-2)
- "Unawares " in The Wild Side (Baen, August 2011, ISBN 978-1-4391-3456-6)
- "An Answer from the North" in Courts of the Fey (DAW, November 2011, ISBN 978-0-7564-0699-8)
- "Heart's Place" in Under the Vale and Other Tales of Valdemar (DAW, December 2011, ISBN 978-0-7564-0696-7)
- "The Big Ship and the Wise Old Owl" in Going Interstellar (Baen, June 2012, ISBN 978-1-4516-3778-6)
- "Angel in Flight" in A Cosmic Christmas (Baen, November 2012, ISBN 978-1-4516-3862-2)
- "Dog's Body" in Baen Free Stories 2013 (Baen, March 2013, ISBN 978-1-62579-095-8)
- "Dragons" in In Space No One Can Hear You Scream (Baen, October 2013, ISBN 978-1-4516-3941-4)
- "Tarzan and the Martian Invaders" with Kevin J. Anderson in Worlds of Edgar Rice Burroughs (Baen, October 2013, ISBN 978-1-4516-3935-3)
- "Shepherds and Wolves" in A Cosmic Christmas 2 You (Baen, November 2013, ISBN 978-1-4516-3942-1)
- "Around the Bend" in Raygun Chronicles: Space Opera for a New Age (Every Day Publishing, December 2013, ISBN 978-0-9881257-5-9)
- "From Out the Fire" in "The Baen Big Book of Monsters" (Baen, October 2014, ISBN 978-1-4767-3699-0)
- "And Not to Yield" in Five by Five 3: Target Zone (WordFire Press, November 2014, ISBN 978-1-61475-248-6)
- "Dreamcatcher" in Shared Nightmares (Cold Fusion Media, November 2014, ISBN 978-0-692-34270-1)
- "Rising Above" in Shattered Shields (Baen, November 2014, ISBN 978-1-4767-3701-0)
- "So Little and So Light" in As Time Goes By (Baen, February 2015, ISBN 978-1-4767-8052-8)
- "Calling the Mom Squad" in Chicks and Balances (Baen, July 2015, ISBN 978-1-4767-8063-4)
- "Who Goes Boing?" in Future Wars ... and Other Punchlines (Baen, September 2015, ISBN 978-1-4767-8080-1)
- "A Cog in Time" in Onward, Drake! (Baen, October 2015, ISBN 978-1-4767-8096-2)
- "On Edge" in Mission: Tomorrow (Baen, November 2015, ISBN 978-1-4767-8094-8)
- "Her Sister's Keeper" in Worst Contact (Baen, January 2016, ISBN 978-1-4767-8098-6)
- "Do No Harm" in Black Tide Rising (Baen, June 2016, ISBN 978-1-4767-8151-8)
- "And Your Little Dog, Too" in Things from Outer Space (Baen, October 2016, ISBN 978-1-4767-8166-2)
- "Flight to Egypt" in Forbidden Thoughts (Superversive Press, January 2017, ISBN 978-0-9945163-7-4)
- "Tic Toc" in If This Goes Wrong... (Baen, January 2017, ISBN 978-1-4767-8202-7)
- "Freeman's Stand" in Rocket's Red Glare (Rough Edges Press, May 2017, ISBN 978-1-5466-7053-7)
- "Dry Gulch Dragon" in Straight Outta Tombstone (Baen, July 2017, ISBN 978-1-4814-8269-1)
- "Hunter Born" in Monster Hunter Files (Baen, October 2017, ISBN 978-1-4814-8275-2)
- "Home Front" with Jeff Greason in Space Pioneers (Baen, November 2018, ISBN 978-1-4814-8360-5)
- "Father Avenir and the Fire Demons of Yellowstone" with Kevin J. Anderson in Baen Books: Free Stories 2018 (Baen, 2018)
- "Storming the Tower of Babel" in Voices of the Fall (Baen, March 2019, ISBN 978-1-4814-8382-7)
- "Honey Fall" in Noir Fatale (Baen, May 2019, ISBN 978-1-4814-8397-1)

== Awards and honors ==
Hoyt has received the following awards and honors:

Year	Organization	Award title, Category	Work	Result	Refs
2002	Locus	Locus Award, Best First Novel	Ill Met by Moonlight	7	
2002	Mythopoeic Society	Mythopoeic Award, Fantasy Award for Adult Literature	Ill Met by Moonlight	Nominated	
2011	Libertarian Futurist Society	Prometheus Award, Best Libertarian SF Novel	Darkship Thieves	Won	
2013	Libertarian Futurist Society	Prometheus Award, Best Libertarian SF Novel	Darkship Renegades	Finalist	
2014	Libertarian Futurist Society	Prometheus Award, Best Libertarian SF Novel	A Few Good Men	Finalist	
2018	Libertarian Futurist Society	Prometheus Award, Best Libertarian SF Novel	Darkship Revenge	Finalist	
2018	Dragon Con	Dragon Award, Best Alternate History Novel	Uncharted with Kevin J. Anderson	Won	
2026	Libertarian Futurist Society	Prometheus Award, Best Libertarian SF Novel	No Man's Land	Finalist	
