= The Haunted Air =

- First Edition
- Author: F. Paul Wilson
- Cover artist: Harry O. Morris
- Language: English
- Series: The Repairman Jack Series
- Genre: Horror novel
- Publisher: Gauntlet Press
- Publication date: 2002
- Publication place: United States
- Media type: Print (Hardcover and Paperback)
- Pages: 462 pp
- ISBN: 1-887368-57-4
- OCLC: 49894584
- Dewey Decimal: 813/.54 21
- LC Class: PS3573.I45695 H38 2002
- Preceded by: Hosts
- Followed by: Gateways

The Haunted Air is the sixth volume in a series of Repairman Jack books written by American author F. Paul Wilson. The book was first published by Gauntlet Press in a signed limited first edition (June 2002) then later as a trade hardcover from Forge (October 2002) and a mass market paperback from Forge (April 2004).
