= Infernal (novel) =

Repairman Jack series novel by F. Paul Wilson

- First edition
- Author: F. Paul Wilson
- Language: English
- Series: The Repairman Jack Series
- Publisher: Gauntlet Press
- Publication date: July 2005
- Publication place: United States
- Media type: Print (Hardcover and Paperback)
- Pages: 363 pp
- ISBN: 1-887368-78-7
- OCLC: 60822428
- Dewey Decimal: 813/.6 22
- LC Class: PS3573.I45695 I54 2005
- Preceded by: Crisscross
- Followed by: Harbingers

Infernal is the ninth volume in a series of Repairman Jack books written by American author F. Paul Wilson. The book was first published by Gauntlet Press in a signed limited first edition (July 2005) then later as a trade hardcover from Forge (November 2005) and a mass market paperback from Forge (September 2006).
