= Lipidleggin' =

1978 short story by F. Paul Wilson

"Lipidleggin'" is a science fiction short story by American writer F. Paul Wilson. It was first published in Isaac Asimov's Science Fiction Magazine in 1978.

== Plot ==
In a world where the government has outlawed butter and untreated eggs because of their high cholesterol content, Gurney is an antiques dealer in rural New Jersey who discovers farmers who are producing the 'real stuff' and starts dealing in them, thus becoming a 'lipidlegger'.

== Reception ==
In 2021, "Lipidleggin'" won the Prometheus Award Hall of Fame.

Kirkus Reviews considered it "sharp social satire". Eric S. Raymond called it "classic" and an example of Wilson's "excellent" science fiction.
