= Crisscross (novel) =

2004 novel by F. Paul Wilson

- First edition
- Author: F. Paul Wilson
- Language: English
- Series: The Repairman Jack Series
- Genre: Thriller, Horror novel
- Publisher: Gauntlet Press
- Publication date: 2004
- Publication place: United States
- Media type: Print (Hardcover and Paperback)
- Pages: 407 pp
- ISBN: 1-887368-70-1
- OCLC: 55605725
- Dewey Decimal: 813/.54 22
- LC Class: PS3573.I45695 C75 2004
- Preceded by: Gateways
- Followed by: Infernal

Crisscross is the eighth volume in a series of Repairman Jack books written by American author F. Paul Wilson. The book was first published by Gauntlet Press in a signed limited first edition (May 2004) then later as a trade hardcover from Forge (October 2004) and a mass market paperback from Forge (June 2006).
