= The Select =

1993 novel by F. Paul Wilson

- First edition cover
- Author: F. Paul Wilson
- Original title: The Foundation
- Publisher: Headline
- Publication date: 1993

The Select is a novel written by American author and medical doctor F. Paul Wilson. It was first published in England in 1993 as The Foundation under Wilson's pen name Colin Andrews. In the following year, it was released in the US as by F. Paul Wilson.

The book is a suspense thriller in the style of Robin Cook about a student named Quinn Cleary who discovers that her fellow students are being brainwashed in a prestigious medical school named the Ingraham. Campus Security personnel are officially sanctioned, mainly by means of illegal electronic surveillance, to pinpoint potential troublemakers and to assist in neutralizing them. The top administrators are not averse to using extreme countermeasures to protect their sacred charter.
