= Sims (novel) =

2003 novel by F. Paul Wilson

- First edition
- Author: F. Paul Wilson
- Language: English
- Genre: Science fiction
- Publisher: Forge Books
- Publication date: 2003
- Publication place: United States
- Media type: Print
- Pages: 414
- Awards: Prometheus Award
- ISBN: 0-7653-0551-8
- OCLC: 50718076
- Dewey Decimal: 813.54
- LC Class: PS3573.I45695

Sims is a science fiction novel by American writer F. Paul Wilson that explores a near-future event where Humanzees (Human-Chimpanzee hybrids) are created as a de facto slave race.

== Plot summary ==
In the near future, there have been amazing advances in genetics research. Through gene therapy, many deadly diseases have been cured. The SimGen Corporation has created a transgenic species called SIMS, creatures that are part chimpanzee and part human, and are treated as slaves. Suddenly a group of sims working as caddies at a golf course decide they want to unionize. They hire lawyer Patrick Sullivan to represent them, and Sullivan begins to ponder whether or not sims are entitled to equal human rights.

During the course of the novel, Patrick meets activist Romy Cadman and a mysterious man called Zero, who are on a crusade to destroy SimGen and stop the creation of sims. While the three of them try to protect the sims, they come close to uncovering a sinister secret within SimGen, a secret the company will stop at nothing to prevent from getting out.

The story touches on a possible future for genetics research, including the idea of primate hybrids with human DNA, and asks the question: Where would such creatures stand in human society, and would they be considered animal or human?
