= The Rift (David novel) =

1991 novel by Peter David

The Rift is a 1991 novel by American writer Peter David.

== Story ==
The story begins with Captain Pike, seen in the original pilot episode for Star Trek. It then features Captain Kirk and his crew from the future.

Mr. Spock learns his favorite word, "fascinating", from the female first officer known only as Number One, deciding it wasn't too emotional and would be a good word to remember for the future.

== Background ==
David submitted three novel outlines to Paramount, written in three different styles. The two he thought were good were rejected, and the one he said was "simply a conglomeration of old cliches from previous Star Trek episodes" was the only one they liked, and approved. He has said that it was designed to make the other two look good, and wasn't designed to be the one they picked.

The book was one of eight nominees for the 1992 Prometheus Award for Best Novel, presented by the Libertarian Futurist Society to works published in 1991; the award went to Fallen Angels by Larry Niven, Jerry Pournelle and Michael Flynn.
