= Chantecler (play) =

1910 play by Edmond Rostand

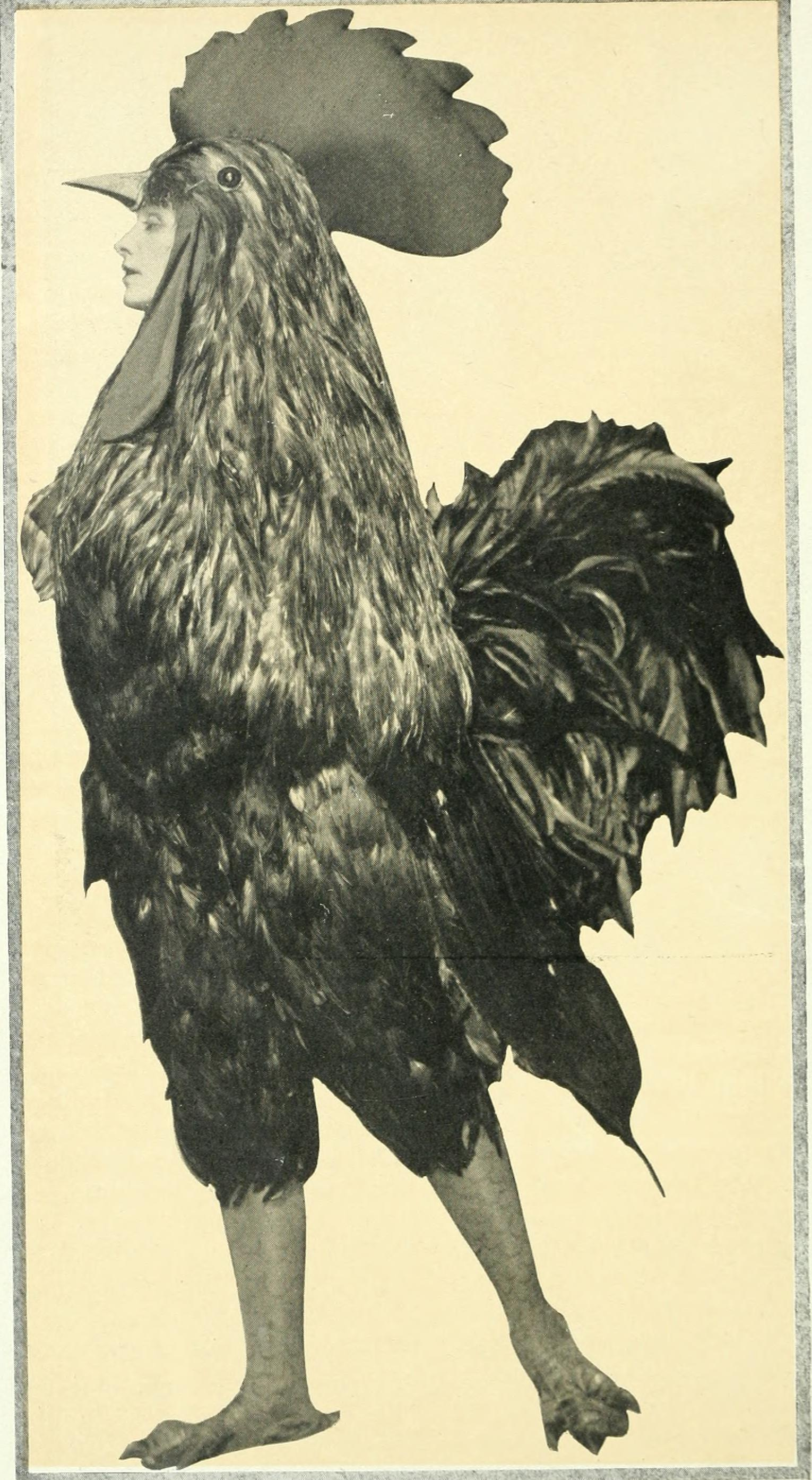
Maude Adams in Chantecler

Chantecler is a verse play in four acts written by Edmond Rostand. The play is notable in that all the characters are farmyard animals including the main protagonist, a chanticleer, or rooster. The play centers on the theme of idealism and spiritual sincerity, as contrasted with cynicism and artificiality. Much of the play satirizes modernist artistic doctrines from Rostand's romanticist perspective.

== Conception and productions ==
Rostand was inspired to write the play after exploring the farming countryside around his new home, Villa Arnaga, in the Basque Country of the French Pyrenees, where he had come to live for health reasons after the phenomenal success of Cyrano de Bergerac and L'Aiglon. Although he began writing the play in 1902, its completion was repeatedly delayed due to Rostand's perfectionism and illnesses. This is Rostand's most personal play, reflecting his deep love for the French countryside and its simple way of life; his disgust at the increasing cynicism and materialism in French society, and the constant anguish he felt as a creative artist. Disillusion and how to overcome it is also a personal theme. Rostand wrote the play for Benoît-Constant Coquelin, known as "Coq" (the French word for a cockerel/rooster), who had created the role of Cyrano de Bergerac in 1897. But Coquelin died of a heart attack in 1909 (clutching, it was said, a copy of the script of Chantecler).

The play finally premiered on 7 February 1910 at the Théâtre de la Porte Saint-Martin in Paris, with Lucien Guitry in the title role, a boulevard actor unsuitable for the idealistic and poetic role intended for Coquelin. The play was not initially successful, partly because of the novelty of animal characters and the long delays (not all the fault of Rostand), but also to Guitry's uninspired performance, and because the sophisticated Parisians in the audience realised their way of life was being criticised. A revival in 1927, starring Victor Francen, was more successful. A notable British production was Terence Gray's final production at the Cambridge Festival Theatre in 1933 before he terminated his ownership of the theatre. Wilfred Walter, an experienced actor, played Chantecler, and the cast included most of the Festival's actors of the day, including Doria Paston, Gilson MacCormnack, Noel Iliff, the dancer Sara Patrick and the next director of the theatre, Joseph Macleod. The design was by Paston with costumes by Hedley Briggs and choreography by Sara Patrick, with music by Walter Leigh.

The play made its American debut on Broadway in 1911, featuring Maude Adams in an adaptation by Louis N. Parker. Chantecler has recently been revived in France, with several acclaimed performances since 1984.

== Plot summary ==
=== Prologue ===
The play begins with a prologue in which the "director" asks the audience to imagine themselves in a barnyard, and calls down a giant magnifying-glass to better see the animals up close.

=== Act I ===
Chantecler is a gallic rooster (a traditional symbol of France) who secretly believes that his crowing causes the sun to rise. The play opens as several other animals are discussing the singing skills of the Blackbird, Rostand’s symbol of sophisticated cynicism and artistic naturalism. The hens and the Blackbird then praise Chantecler's crowing skills until he enters and sings his "Hymn to The Sun" (a poetic set piece that remains a popular recitation in France). Although the hens try to persuade Chantecler to confess the secret of his crowing, he refuses. He converses with Patou, the farmyard dog, about the Blackbird's cynicism and biting wit; while Chantecler considers it of little importance, Patou warns that Blackbird's flippant attitude is a dangerous moral influence because it weakens sincere belief in the potential of heroism. Suddenly, a female golden pheasant (a female who nevertheless has the colorful plumage of a male) arrives in the barnyard, fleeing from a hunter. Chantecler helps hide her in Patou's doghouse.

=== Act II ===
At night, the nighttime birds of prey, along with the cat and the Blackbird, all led by an owl called the Grand Duke plot to kill Chantecler because his crowing interrupts their nefarious plans. They devise a plot to lure Chantecler to the weekly soirée held by the fashionable Guinea Hen, where they will also invite a famous game cock to assassinate Chantecler. The pheasant overhears, but the Blackbird persuades her not to tell Chantecler of the plot. When Chantecler appears to crow for the dawn, the pheasant persuades him to attend the soirée, and also to confess his secret belief that his crowing makes the sun rise. The Blackbird, hiding in a flower pot, eavesdrops through the hole in the pot's bottom, but because his position doesn't allow him to see the sunrise, he assumes Chantecler's confession is only a ruse to seduce the pheasant. After the pheasant leaves, Blackbird tells Chantecler that the game cock will attend Guinea Hen's soirée, and Chantecler insists on attending and confronting him.

=== Act III ===
At the soirée, a series of increasingly fancy-bred roosters are introduced before Chantecler arrives; disgusted by the artificiality of the other birds' plumage, he insists on being introduced simply as "the cock". When the fighting cock appears, he and Chantecler fight, with all the birds except the pheasant and Patou cheering for the fighting cock. Chantecler is badly beaten and nearly killed, but at the last moment, a hawk flies overhead and he and the other birds cower in fear. Chantecler bravely shields the others with his body, and scares the hawk away. When the hawk leaves, the game cock makes a last lunge at Chantecler, but wounds himself instead and is carried away. Chantecler bitterly denounces the Blackbird's soulless cynicism and the crowd's envious rooting for his enemy, and departs for the forest with the pheasant.

=== Act IV ===
In the woods, the pheasant, jealous of Chantecler's single-minded devotion to his ideal, entreats Chantecler to give up his love for the sun and devote himself entirely to her. He cannot bring himself to do so, and secretly calls the barnyard for news updates on a telephone made from vines. (The telephone was a relatively new technology at the time Rostand was writing.) When the pheasant discovers the ruse, she demands that Chantecler prove his love by not crowing, but when he refuses this, she decides to trick him into listening to the nightingale's song, knowing its beauty will distract him long enough for dawn to appear without him. A group of toads arrive, praising Chantecler's song as far prettier than the nightingale's, which he has never heard. When the nightingale begins to sing, Chantecler is awestruck by the beauty of his song, and realizes that the toads' derision paralleled the farm animals' jealous derision of his own crowing. Finding themselves kindred spirits, the nightingale and Chantecler praise each other's songs. At that instant, a hunter (the same man who owns Chantecler's farm) shoots and kills the nightingale. While Chantecler is grieving, the pheasant points out to him that dawn has come without him. Chantecler is at first distraught, but then realizes that the farm still needs his crowing because without it, people and animals will sleep and not realise another day has begun. The spiritual dawn brought about by his singing repels the bleak spiritual night that provides cover for the birds of prey. He decides it is his duty to return to the farm, and when the pheasant demands that he love her more than the dawn, he refuses, and leaves her. Although initially angered, when the pheasant realises that the hunter who shot the nightingale is now aiming at Chantecler, she is overcome by her love and her admiration for Chantecler's idealistic devotion. To save his life, she tries to distract the hunter by flying up herself, but is caught in a net he had set in order to capture her for his farmyard. The shot goes wide; Chantecler returns safely to the farmyard, where he will soon be joined by the captured pheasant, who has resigned herself to taking second place to the cockerel's devotion to his duty of crowing every morning.

== English translations ==
Among published English translations of Chantecler are: Gertrude Hall (1910), Henderson Daingerfield Norman (1923), Clifford Hershey Bissel & William Van Wyck (1947); and Kay Nolte Smith (1987). Parker's adaptation does not appear to have been published. The play has also been adapted into a musical with the dialogue crafted in rhymed verse https://pwcenter.org/plays/chantecler/].

Two modern annotated editions are available: with notes and introduction in French by Philippe Bulinge (GF Flammarion 2006) or with notes and introduction in English by Sue Lloyd (Genge Press, UK, 2010).

== Legacy ==
In June 1960, Disney told the Los Angeles Times that, following the release of One Hundred and One Dalmatians, two animated projects were in development, which were Chanticleer and The Sword in the Stone. Around that same time, Disney's elder brother Roy O. Disney attempted to persuade him to discontinue their feature animation division, as enough films remained to make successful re-releases. The younger Disney refused, but, because of his plans to build another theme park in the United States, he would approve only one animated film to be released every four years. Chanticleer was developed by Ken Anderson and Marc Davis, who aimed to produce a feature animated film in a more contemporary setting. They visited the Disney archives and decided to work on adapting the satirical tale after glancing at earlier conceptions dating back to the 1940s. Anderson, Davis, Milt Kahl, and director Wolfgang Reitherman spent months preparing elaborate storyboards for Chanticleer. Following a silent response to one pitch presentation, a voice from the back of the room said, "You can't make a personality out of a chicken!" When the time came to approve either Chanticleer or The Sword in the Stone, Disney remarked that the problem with making a rooster a protagonist was, "[you] don't feel like picking a rooster up and petting it."

The story of Chantecler was loosely adapted into the 1991 American animated film Rock-a-Doodle, directed by Don Bluth and with the main character inspired by Elvis Presley, set in Tennessee in 1957. The film was a critical and box office failure, though it would achieve greater success during its home video release.

== See also ==
- Reynard the Fox

== Sources ==
- Liberma, Marco Francis, The story of Chantecler, a critical analysis of Rostand's play, New York: Moffat, Yard and Company, 1910
- Lloyd, Sue, The Man who was Cyrano, pp 219–268, UK, Genge Press, 2007 ISBN 978-0-9549043-1-9
- Lloyd, Sue, Chantecler, French text annotated in English, UK, Genge Press, 2010 ISBN 978-0-9549043-4-0
