= Kay Nolte Smith =

American novelist

Kay Nolte Smith (July 4, 1932 – September 25, 1993) was an American novelist, essayist, and translator. She was for a time friendly with the philosopher-novelist Ayn Rand, who was her leading literary and philosophical influence.

Smith was born in Eveleth, Minnesota and grew up in Baraboo, Wisconsin. Smith launched her literary career after her separation from the Ayn Rand circle. In 1981, Smith wrote her first novel The Watcher, mystery story, and was winner of the Edgar Allan Poe Award for Best First Novel. Smith's second novel, Catching Fire, was written in 1982 and is set in the world of the New York theater, with an anti-trade union political stance. Two years later, Mindspell was written to centre on the conflict between science versus religion, with Nolte Smith stating this fiction was written "to challenge strongly the belief in the occult". In 1985, just a year after her third novel, Elegy for a Soprano was written as a roman a clef inspired by Rand, Nathaniel Branden, and the circle around them. Elegy for a Soprano also portrays the life of Jewish Holocaust survivors from Czechoslovakia and Norway. In 1987, Smith wrote her fifth novel, Country of the Heart. Two of her novels—Elegy for a Soprano and A Tale of the Wind—were nominated for Prometheus Awards in 1986 and 1992, respectively.

She published seven novels before her death from cancer at age 61.

== Bibliography ==
=== Novels ===
- The Watcher (1981) — Won the Edgar for Best First [mystery] Novel by an American Author
- Catching Fire (1982)
- Mindspell (1984)
- Elegy for a Soprano (1985) — nominated for 1986 Prometheus Award in Best Novel category
- Country of the Heart (1987)
- A Tale of the Wind (1991) — nominated for 1992 Prometheus Award in Best Novel category
- Venetian Song (1994)

=== Translations ===
Smith translated the play Chantecler: A Play in Four Acts by Edmond Rostand in 1987 into English from the French original.

=== Essays ===
"Truth or the Consequences" in Women without Superstition: No Gods, No Masters.
