= Gateways (novel) =

2003 book by F. Paul Wilson

- First edition
- Author: F. Paul Wilson
- Language: English
- Series: The Repairman Jack Series
- Publisher: Gauntlet Press
- Publication date: 2003
- Publication place: United States
- Media type: Print (hardback & paperback)
- Pages: 355 pp
- ISBN: 1-887368-67-1
- OCLC: 52268953
- Dewey Decimal: 813/.54 21
- LC Class: PS3573.I45695 G38 2003
- Preceded by: The Haunted Air
- Followed by: Crisscross

Gateways is the seventh volume in a series of Repairman Jack books written by American author F. Paul Wilson. The book was first published by Gauntlet Press in a signed limited first edition (2003) then later as a trade hardcover from Forge (November 2003) and a mass market paperback from Forge (February 2006).
