= All the Rage (novel) =

2000 novel by American author F. Paul Wilson

All The Rage
- First edition
- Author: F. Paul Wilson
- Cover artist: Harry O. Morris
- Language: English
- Series: The Repairman Jack Series
- Published: July 2000, Gauntlet Press
- Publication place: United States
- Media type: Print (hardback & paperback)
- Pages: 363 pp
- ISBN: 1-887368-29-9
- OCLC: 44046742
- Dewey Decimal: 813/.54 21
- LC Class: PS3573.I45695 A79 2000
- Preceded by: Conspiracies
- Followed by: Hosts

All The Rage is the fourth volume in a series of Repairman Jack books written by American author F. Paul Wilson. The book was first published by Gauntlet Press in a signed limited first edition (July 2000) then later as a trade hardcover from Forge (November 2000) and as a mass market paperback from Forge (September 2000).

== Critical reception ==
Reviewer Charles de Lint recommended All the Rage as "a hardboiled mystery, with a dash of the supernatural and a good helping of suspense and action."

== Reception ==
- ALL THE RAGE (Book Review). Publishers Weekly. 2000;247(39):93. Accessed August 14, 2025. https://search.ebscohost.com/login.aspx?direct=true&db=lkh&AN=3612998&lang=ru&site=eds-live&scope=site
- Hanson VD. All the rage. New Criterion. 2024;42(10):8-16. Accessed August 14, 2025. https://search.ebscohost.com/login.aspx?direct=true&db=asu&AN=177333370&lang=ru&site=eds-live&scope=site
