= The Keep (film) =

1983 film by Michael Mann

- Original theatrical release poster
- Directed by: Michael Mann
- Screenplay by: Michael Mann
- Based on: The Keep by F. Paul Wilson
- Produced by: Gene Kirkwood; Howard W. Koch, Jr.
- Starring: Scott Glenn; Jürgen Prochnow; Robert Prosky; Ian McKellen
- Cinematography: Alex Thomson
- Edited by: Dov Hoenig
- Music by: Tangerine Dream
- Distributed by: Paramount Pictures
- Release date: 16 December 1983 (U.S.)
- Running time: 96 minutes
- Countries: United Kingdom; United States
- Language: English
- Budget: $6 million
- Box office: $4.2 million (U.S.)

The Keep is a 1983 supernatural horror film written and directed by Michael Mann and starring Scott Glenn, Gabriel Byrne, Jürgen Prochnow, Alberta Watson and Ian McKellen. Set in Romania during World War II, it follows a group of Nazi soldiers who unleash a malevolent supernatural force after setting up camp in an ancient stone fortress in the Carpathian Mountains. It is an adaptation of the 1981 novel of the same title by American writer F. Paul Wilson. The musical score was composed by Tangerine Dream.

Filmed in Wales and at Shepperton Studios during the autumn of 1982, The Keep suffered numerous post-production problems, mainly the death of special effects supervisor Wally Veevers before he completed his work on the film. The film was also subject to significant editing troubles, as Mann's original director's cut was 210 minutes long, which its distributor, Paramount Pictures, required be cut to 120 minutes. After test screenings of the 120-minute version received unfavorable audience responses, the film was truncated to its final 96-minute cut, which was released theatrically in December 1983.

Upon release, The Keep received mixed reviews with many criticizing it for its unclear narrative, though it received some praise for its visual elements. The film performed poorly at the U.S. box office. However, The Keep has gone on to develop a cult following in the years since its release.

== Plot ==
In 1941 Romania, following the commencement of Operation Barbarossa, a motorized Gebirgsjäger unit of the Wehrmacht, under the command of Captain Klaus Woermann, arrives at an uninhabited citadel known as 'the Keep', with the aim of taking control of the Dinu Pass in the Carpathian Mountains. Two soldiers, privates Lutz and Anton, attempt to loot a metallic icon within the Keep, but accidentally unleash a spectral entity who kills them. The being, known as Radu Molasar, kills five more soldiers in the following days and begins to take corporeal form.

Woermann's report of the deaths and request for backup is answered by the arrival of a detachment of SS Einsatzkommandos, under the command of sadistic SD Sturmbannführer Erich Kaempffer. Kaempffer claims the deaths are a result of Soviet partisan activity in the village overlooking the Keep. He executes three civilians as collective punishment and takes another five as hostages, despite Woermann's protests.

The Germans find a mysterious message emblazoned on a wall of the citadel. The local village priest, Father Mihail Fonescu, suggests they retrieve a native of the village, ailing Jewish historian Theodore Cuza, from a concentration camp, to decipher it. Upon arrival, Cuza translates the message and says it's written in Old Slavonic, using the Glagolitic alphabet. He and his daughter, Eva, are given quarters inside the Keep.

Soon after, two Einsatzkommandos attempt to rape Eva. Molasar saves her by obliterating the soldiers, brings her to Cuza and, by touching him, cures his debilitating scleroderma. He, then, demands Cuza remove a talisman, which he claims is his, from the Keep. Molasar states this will allow his escape from the Keep's confines and affirms he will, then, destroy the Nazis as he did Eva's assaulters. Cuza, twice indebted to the entity and relishing the emergence of an anti-Nazi force, agrees.

Having remotely sensed Molasar's presence, a man named Glaeken Trismegestus travels from Axis-occupied Greece to the village, carrying a large case. He seduces Eva and incurs Cuza's ire. Questioned by Eva about his origins and identity, Glaeken says his mission is and always has been to destroy the evil within the Keep and that, when that evil is gone, he will be, too. Learning of the plan to remove the talisman, he tells Cuza the talisman is his, not Molasar's, and that its power is all that is preventing the evil within the Keep from being unleashed upon the World.

The malign influence of Molasar begins to affect the villagers, driving them mad. Kaempffer sends a group of soldiers to arrest Glaeken. When he resists, the soldiers shoot and force him into a ravine. Woermann furiously denounces Kaempffer for his sadistic crimes, claiming that the monster hunting the Nazis is a reflection of their evil. Their conversation is suddenly interrupted by the sound of horrible screams and machine-gun fire from the Keep's inner courtyard. Kaempffer shoots and kills Woermann, then goes to the silent courtyard. He finds all Germans slaughtered and all the military vehicles parked inside disabled.

Molasar appears and kills the terrified Kaempffer, while Cuza retrieves the talisman to remove it from the Keep. After acquiring the talisman, Cuza starts for the outside while Glaeken, having survived the fall, climbs the ravine and goes to the inn, grabbing a staff from his travel case.

Eva enters the Keep and attempts to stop her father. Cuza resists and strikes her down, but, when Molasar commands him to kill her, he stops fighting and starts questioning the entity, instead. As punishment, Molasar returns Cuza to his diseased state. Glaeken arrives, retrieves the talisman, combines it with the staff, forming a weapon, and confronts Molasar. The weapon emits beams that interact with the Keep's icons to disable Molasar, turning him back into mist and banishing him back into the innermost recesses of the Keep. Glaeken is transformed in a storm of light and seals the aperture that freed the entity, containing him within, once more. The villagers, freed from Molasar's maddening influence, escort Eva and Cuza away.

== Cast ==
- Scott Glenn as Glaeken Trismegestus
- Alberta Watson as Eva Cuza
- Jürgen Prochnow as Captain Klaus Woermann
- Robert Prosky as Father Mihail Fonescu
- Gabriel Byrne as Sturmbannführer Erich Kaempffer
- Ian McKellen as Dr. Theodore Cuza
- W. Morgan Sheppard as Alexandru
- Royston Tickner as Tomescu
- Michael Carter as Radu Molasar
- Rosalie Crutchley as Josefa
- Phillip Joseph as Sgt. Dietrich Oster
- John Vine as Private Lutz
- Jona Jones as Private Anton
- Wolf Kahler as Waffen-SS Adjutant
- Yashar Adem as Carlos
- David Cardy as Alexandru's first son
- John Eastham as Alexandru's second son
- Frederick Warder as First border guard
- Bruce Payne as Second border guard
- Stephen Whittaker as Einsatzkommando

== Themes ==
Writer Steven Rybin notes in his book Michael Mann: Crime Auteur that The Keep "does not construct a view of the world in which simple and unambiguous forces such as 'good' and 'evil' do battle. Mann clearly finds human evil in the failure of systems and not in individuals", citing the fact that the Nazi soldiers in the film pillage the metal crosses from the stone fortress for economic gain, unwittingly unleashing the evil spirit of Molasar. Rybin also asserts that, despite the narrative's core thematic elements, Mann is more concerned with crafting a "visual and sonic fairytale".

== Production ==
=== Filming ===
Principal photography began in September 1982 in Wales, with an original shooting schedule of 13 weeks. Filming was gruelling, and once principal photography was finished, additional re-shoots were done which extended the filming for a total of 22 weeks.

The sets for the Romanian village were built at the disused Glyn Rhonwy quarry, a former slate quarry near Llanberis in North Wales. Some interiors of the keep utilised the stonework within the Llechwedd Slate Caverns, near Blaenau Ffestiniog. Due to heavy rain, the film suffered significant delays in its shooting schedule. Shepperton Studios near London was used for interior Keep scenes featuring the demon Molasar. A secondary crew also went to Spain for footage depicting Greece.

English historian and film costume designer Andrew Mollo, brother of John Mollo of Star Wars fame, worked as an historical consultant for the German military costumes. In spite of the fact that war time Waffen-SS members typically wore grey-green (field grey) uniforms, according to Mollo, Michael Mann was insistent that they wear their iconic black uniforms, to let the audience know that Byrne's character and his men were Nazi fanatics.

=== Special effects ===
The appearance of the film's malevolent villain, Molasar, was changed several times during filming because Michael Mann was unsure of how he wanted him to appear. Initially, Molasar was envisioned by Mann as an intangible entity whose appearance would be influenced purely by his surroundings. However, this description as it appeared in Mann's screenplay proved difficult for the special effects team to create. Mann ultimately settled on the entity initially appearing as an amorphous ball of energy which begins to take human shape with each appearance as the film progresses, morphing from a bundle of energy resembling a human nervous system, to a skeletal and then muscular form, and ultimately, a "statuesque Golem-like" body in the film's climax. A mechanical version of Molasar, which was designed early on during production, ultimately went unused due to Mann's shifting ideas about the monster's appearance, and instead the creature was portrayed by an actor in a bodysuit in its later humanoid stages.

The film's special effects were designed by Nick Maley, along with Nick Allder, who had previously worked on Alien and The Empire Strikes Back. Molasar was conceived by Enki Bilal.

=== Post-production troubles ===
Two weeks into post-production, visual effects supervisor Wally Veevers died, which caused enormous problems because nobody knew how he planned to finish the visual effects scenes in the movie, especially the ones that were planned for the original ending. According to Mann, he had to finish 260 shots of special effects himself after Veevers' death.

The original climax that Mann envisioned involved Glaeken and Molasar in an epic effects-laden battle on top of the keep tower, ending with Glaeken opening an energy portal that blasts forth from the ground of the keep. The two were to fall from the keep wall and get sucked into the portal and tumble through a void. After that, Glaeken would materialize in the cavern below the keep by a pool and be reawakened as a mortal man.

With the production extensions and the film already having gone well over budget, Paramount refused to pay for the filming of the additional footage needed for this finale, necessitating that Mann instead opt for the simplified conclusion present in the film's theatrical cut.

==== Original director's cut ====
Mann's original cut of The Keep ran 210 minutes in length. At the demand of Paramount Pictures, this was trimmed to around 120 minutes. Test screenings of the two-hour cut were not favorable so Paramount further cut the film down to 96 minutes, against Mann's wishes. These last-minute cuts resulted in many plot holes, continuity mistakes, obvious "jumps" in soundtrack and scenes, and issues with poor editing. A proper sound mix of the movie could not be completed due to Paramount's interference, causing every version of the movie to suffer from poor sound design. The original 3 June 1983 release date was pushed back to 16 December due to the many problems in post-production.

The original happier ending — which had Eva finding Glaeken inside the keep after he defeated Molasar, and Eva and her father leaving Romania by boat with Glaeken — was cut by Paramount in order for the film to have a shorter running time. Removal of these scenes caused confusion because numerous stills of this ending were shown in magazine coverage. The cast, crew, including Mann, said in interviews that the film had a happy ending. Part of the happy ending, in which Eva goes into the keep and finds Glaeken, was used in 1980s TV versions of the film. Other deleted scenes include more backstory between Glaeken and Molasar, actual explanation for why Eva and Glaeken fell in love, Glaeken killing the captain of the boat (the one who brings him into Romania) who tries to steal his "weapon" which he uses in the end to kill Molasar, more scenes between villagers and with Father Mihail and Alexandru, and Alexandru being killed by his sons when the keep starts to corrupt the village.

Contrary to rumor, there was going to be a scene near the ending showing Molasar killing all the German soldiers inside the keep. Much of the effects for this scene including shots of soldiers heads exploding were filmed but this scene, which would include a lot more complicated effects, was unable to be finished after Veever's death.

== Music ==
The theme and incidental music for The Keep was composed by Tangerine Dream. The band previously worked with Mann on his first theatrical film Thief (1981). The score to The Keep is primarily made up of moody soundscapes, as opposed to straightforward music cues. Most notably, an ambient cover of Howard Blake's "Walking in the Air" was featured during the end sequence of the film. Additionally, Tangerine Dream's arrangement of the "Gloria" from Missa Puer natus est nobis by Thomas Tallis can also be heard in the film. It is credited in the vinyl release as "Puer Natus Est Nobis (Gloria Theme)". However, it is sometimes miscredited as being taken from the Gloria of the Mass for Four Voices, which was written by Tallis during the late reign of Henry VIII some fifteen years before he composed the Gloria of Missa Puer natus for Mary I.

The musical score was released in several different bootleg editions in the years since the film's release.

In 2020, all the music that Tangerine Dream recorded for the 1984 album was officially released in full on the box set compilation Pilots of Purple Twilight (The Virgin Recordings 1980–1983). In July 2021, the score for The Keep was released on a standalone vinyl for Record Store Day by Universal Music Group's Canadian branch. It was subsequently made available for digital download by Universal Music Group on 30 October 2020.

== Release ==
=== Marketing ===
Paramount released a theatrical trailer and television spots in promotion of the film, which include various footage from the extended versions of the film that do not appear in the final cut: Among them are a longer conversation between Woermann and Alexandru in which Woermann says that the keep looks like it was built to keep something in; a longer version of the scene where Molasar is talking with professor Cuza for the first time (also in this scene Cuza asks Molasar "What are you?" one more time); Glaeken talking with Eva asking her if she found what she was looking for and if she expected to find him; Glaeken touching Eva's face while she asks "What's happening to me?"; Glaeken walking inside the keep with his eyes turning white; longer version of the ending where Glaeken is standing at the entrance of the keep looking over Molasar's fog/white smoke; different version of the scene (different visual effects) where Glaeken is walking towards the room where Molasar is waiting for him (in this alternate scene Glaeken's sword is covered with some glowing grey light).

=== Home media ===
Paramount Home Entertainment released The Keep on VHS in 1984, and later on LaserDisc on 22 December 1993.

Although the film has been made available for purchase and/or streaming on YouTube, Amazon Video, Apple TV, Criterion Channel (as part of the 80s Horror series) and Netflix (UK and Ireland), it went unreleased in physical disc format (aside from LaserDisc) in any country until the Australian label Via Vision Entertainment released an official remastered DVD edition on 20 January 2020.

On 29 November 2024, Vinegar Syndrome announced a 4K UHD Blu-ray edition of the film, under license from Paramount, in both limited (12,000 copies) and standard editions which were made available the same day as part of their annual Black Friday web store sale. Both editions sold out within less than 48 hours.

On 10 September 2025 Australian company Via Vision Entertainment released another version, this time a 4k UHD Limited Edition 4 disc boxset of the movie.

== Reception ==
=== Box office ===
The film was given a limited theatrical release in the United States by Paramount Pictures on 16 December 1983 on 508 screens. It earned $1,032,295 during its opening weekend, premiering at number 13 in the national box office, and remained in release until 6 January 1984. It ultimately grossed $4,218,594 during its U.S. theatrical run, and was regarded as a box-office flop.

=== Critical response ===
Gene Siskel, film reviewer for the Chicago Tribune, rated The Keep two out of four stars, complaining that the Tangerine Dream soundtrack tended to overwhelm the dialogue. Siskel wrote, "Stay away from The Keep, one of the most inaudible movies ever made. Oh, sure, you can look at the pictures, but without the dialogue it's going to be most difficult to figure what's going on". Catharine Rambau of the Detroit Free Press also criticized the film, writing: "Michael Mann's gothic horror movie The Keep is a letdown, an unfortunate hybrid mutation of disco horror, rock video, high fashion and imitation art", adding that even its competent special effects and musical score "don't help much".

Siskel & Ebert gave the film largely negative reviews on their syndicated television program. Roger Ebert said Glenn deserved credit for simply delivering his lines with a straight face and added "the visuals and soundtrack are very well done", but he also believed the overall premise was "so absurd we could never take it seriously" outside of a comic book. Gene Siskel said there was "about 15 minutes of a good movie" towards the conclusion, but he felt it was "quite distasteful" how the real-world atrocities of Naziism were used as a backdrop for The Keep.

The Salem, Oregon Statesman Journal's Ron Cowan noted that the film's "murky storytelling" is offset by "some arresting moments", but felt that the film's gore was at times visually excessive. Patrick Taggart of the Austin American-Statesman deemed it "one of the worst films of the year—artily photographed and with nothing to say".

Writing for the Sydney Morning Herald, film reviewer Susie Eisenhuth alternately praised the film, calling it "visually spectacular" and "mesmerising from the opening moments". "The Keep is the sort of movie I expect to see in one of the big cinema centres, being fed to the masses raised on Spielberg and spectacle", Eisenhuth wrote in her review.

==== Retrospective ====
Although a financial and critical failure at the time of its release, The Keep gained a strong fan following and is considered by some to be a cult classic. As of July 2025, the film holds a 42% approval rating on the internet review aggregator Rotten Tomatoes from 19 reviews. Metacritic, which uses a weighted average, assigned the film a score of 34 out of 100, based on 11 critics, indicating "generally unfavorable" reviews. Audiences polled by CinemaScore gave the film an average grade of "C-" on an A+ to F scale.

Michael Nordine of the LA Weekly wrote in a 2013 review that The Keep "can’t always keep its many moving parts in lockstep, what with its hinted-at mythos that obscures more than it elucidates and its cast of enigmatic characters whose precise dealings with one another are never made entirely clear". However Nordine praised Mann's direction, saying it showed "Mann's ... rare ability to elevate ostensibly schlocky material into something dark and majestic".

It has been mentioned that Michael Mann disowned the movie but in a 2009 interview he said that the production design and the form of the film were in better shape than the content, which is why he likes it for those aspects.

== Related works ==
A board game based on the film was designed by James D. Griffin and published by Mayfair Games. Under their Role Aids label, Mayfair Games also produced the role-playing game adventure The Keep based on the film.

IDW Publishing published a 2006 5-issue limited comic book series version of the original novel written by its original author, F. Paul Wilson and drawn by Matthew Dow Smith. The collected series included a foreword where F. Paul Wilson, addressed his reason for scripting a graphic novel version: "Because I consider this visual presentation of THE KEEP my version of the movie, what could have been... what should have been."

== Bibliography ==
- Gaine, Vincent M. (2011). Existentialism and Social Engagement in the Films of Michael Mann. New York City, New York: Palgrave Macmillan. ISBN 9780230348448.
- Rybin, Steven (2013). Michael Mann: Crime Auteur. Lanham, Maryland: Scarecrow Press. ISBN 9780810890848.
