= Bloodline (Wilson novel) =

2007 novel by F. Paul Wilson

- First Edition
- Author: F. Paul Wilson
- Language: English
- Series: The Repairman Jack Series
- Genre: Science fiction Thriller novel
- Publisher: Gauntlet Press
- Publication date: May 2007
- Publication place: United States
- Media type: Print (Hardcover)
- Pages: 421 pp
- ISBN: 1-887368-93-0
- Preceded by: Harbingers
- Followed by: By the Sword (2009)

Bloodline is the eleventh volume in a series of Repairman Jack books written by American author F. Paul Wilson. The book was first published by Gauntlet Press in a signed limited first edition (May 2007) and later as a trade hardcover from Forge (September 2007).

== Plot summary ==
The novel begins a bit after Gia and Vicky recover from the accident brought by the yenceri. Gia, as always persuades Jack to do some fix-its, on the condition that he does not risk too much. The persuasion was followed when a middle-aged woman named Christy Pickering asks for Jack's help. Jack finds that Christy has been having a problem with her daughter Dawn, she is dating a man Jerry Bethlehem, about twice her age (or as Christy puts it: "Old enough to be her father"). The problem is actually with her PI who has just disappeared. Along the way of looking into Bethlehem life, Jack begins to realize a connection between Bethlehem and the leader(Hank Thompson) of a new movement called the Kickers. It seems that both Hank and Jerry went to the same criminal institute known to take extremely violent criminals, the Creighton Institute. Further investigation leads Jack to finding the detective murdered in ways of a water torture. Jack later finds that not only are Hank and Jerry related by Creighton but also by the newfound mysterious oDNA found there. It comes to Jack that the 'o' stands for the wrong side of his life, the Other. He also finds that Jerry is not his real name, it is actually Jeremy Bolton, a sociopath who was captured for a crime far down in Atlanta, GA: the Atlanta Abortion Murders. After getting Dawn pregnant he starts acting differently, showing his true self to her. Upon finding out of her daughters pregnancy, Christy is found dead, presumed suicide by slashing her wrists. Before her death, Jack investigates on the whereabouts of Dawn's father who has never been mentioned by Christy, only to be enlightened with the truth that Dawn is a rape-baby. Further investigation in the oDNA it is realized that Hank, Moonglow(Christy), and Jeremy are all the children of the mysterious oDNA filled Jonah Stevens. As all the pieces come together Jack finds the final piece revealing a dark secret, Jeremy is Dawn's father.
