= Conspiracies (novel) =

1999 novel by F. Paul Wilson

Legacies
- First edition
- Author: F. Paul Wilson
- Cover artist: Harry O. Morris
- Language: English
- Series: The Repairman Jack Series
- Publisher: Gauntlet Press
- Publication date: March 1999
- Publication place: United States
- Media type: Print (Hardcover and Paperback)
- Pages: 327
- ISBN: 1-887368-20-5
- OCLC: 42649785
- Dewey Decimal: 813/.54 21
- LC Class: PS3573.I45695 C66 2000
- Preceded by: Legacies
- Followed by: All The Rage

Conspiracies is the third volume in a series of Repairman Jack books written by American author F. Paul Wilson. The book was first published in March 1999 by Gauntlet Press as a signed, limited edition. A trade hardcover edition by Forge followed in February 2000.

== Reception ==
F&SF reviewer Charles de Lint praised the novel as "an entertaining read, with engaging characters and a plot that twists and turns."
