= The Unincorporated Man =

2009 novel by Dani Kollin and Eytan Kollin

- Cover of first edition (hardcover)
- Author: Dani Kollin and Eytan Kollin
- Cover artist: Chad Baker/Photodisk/Getty Images
- Language: English
- Genre: Science fiction novel, political fiction novel
- Publisher: Tom Doherty Associates
- Publication date: 2009
- Publication place: United States
- Media type: Print, e-Reader, Audio Download, Audio CD, Pre-Loaded Digital Audio Player
- Pages: 480
- ISBN: 978-0765318992

The Unincorporated Man is a science fiction novel by Dani and Eytan Kollin. It was published in 2009. The novel focuses on society, politics and economics.

== Setting ==
It takes place at time after present-day civilization has fallen into complete economic collapse, then been revived. Every individual is incorporated at birth, and spends many years trying to attain control over his or her own life by getting a majority of his or her own shares, a task made difficult given the long life spans now possible.

== Premise ==
Justin Cord, a successful industrialist, was secretly frozen in the early 21st century, is discovered and resurrected. His health is renewed and his vigorous younger body, as well as the promise of wealth and fame. In the future he awakens to, by law everyone is incorporated as a publicly traded corporation at birth, with shares that can be bought or sold like stocks. Having been born before the existence of this law, Cord remains the only unincorporated person in the world. Justin cannot accept only part ownership of himself, even if that places him in conflict with a civilization that extends outside the Solar System, to the Oort Cloud and beyond.

== Criticism ==
A Gizmodo review praised the world building but criticized the writing and one-sided libertarian leanings.

A reviewer argued that the supposed protagonist makes illogical and emotion-based arguments against incorporation while the supposed antagonists and defenders of the incorporation system make sensible and logical economic arguments that the system allows humans to reach their full potential through monetizing human capital, increasing the scope for more voluntary transactions, and gains from trade.

== Recognition ==
The novel won the 2010 Prometheus Award from the Libertarian Futurist Society. It was listed an "essential" book in the category of science fiction by Tor and SyFy.
