= Harbingers (novel) =

2006 novel by F. Paul Wilson

- First Edition
- Author: F. Paul Wilson
- Cover artist: Harry O. Morris
- Language: English
- Series: The Repairman Jack Series
- Publisher: Gauntlet Press
- Publication date: May 2006
- Publication place: United States
- Media type: Print (Hardcover)
- Pages: 359 pp
- ISBN: 1-887368-84-1
- OCLC: 68681215
- Dewey Decimal: 813/.54 22
- LC Class: PS3573.I45695 H37 2006
- Preceded by: Infernal
- Followed by: Bloodline

Harbingers is the tenth volume in a series of Repairman Jack books written by American author F. Paul Wilson. The book was first published by Gauntlet Press in a signed limited first edition (May 2006), later as a trade hardcover from Forge (September 2006), and finally as a mass market paperback from Forge (August 2007).
