= Wheels Within Wheels (novel) =

1978 novel by F. Paul Wilson

First edition (publ. Doubleday) Cover art by David Wilhelmsen

Wheels Within Wheels is a novel by F. Paul Wilson published in 1978.

== Plot summary ==
Wheels Within Wheels is a novel set in the interstellar society called the La Nague Federation.

== Reception ==
Greg Costikyan reviewed Wheels Within Wheels in Ares Magazine #2 and commented that "the author's politics do not dominate the novel – non-libertarians can safely read it without danger to their mental equilibrium."

Kirkus Reviews states "A so-so effort, loosely linked to Wilson's Healer (1976); future volumes will apparently pull together the disparate threads."

The novel won the first Prometheus Award.

== Reviews ==
- Review by Dennis M. Maloney (1979) in Science Fiction & Fantasy Book Review, December 1979
- Review by David Pettus (1980) in Fan Plus, #1 January 1980
- Review by Dave Langford (1980) in Vector 97
- Kliatt
