= The Keep (Wilson novel) =

Horror novel by F. Paul Wilson

- First Edition
- Author: F. Paul Wilson
- Cover artist: Cheryl Asherman
- Language: English
- Series: The Adversary Cycle
- Genre: Horror
- Publisher: William Morrow
- Publication date: August 1981
- Publication place: United States
- Media type: Print (Hardcover and Paperback)
- Pages: 347
- ISBN: 0-688-00626-4
- OCLC: 7279273
- Dewey Decimal: 813/.54 19
- LC Class: PS3573.I45695 K4
- Followed by: The Tomb

The Keep is a 1981 horror novel by American writer F. Paul Wilson. It is also the first volume in a series of six novels known as The Adversary Cycle. It appeared on the New York Times Best Seller list and has been adapted into a film by Michael Mann in 1983 and as a limited series of comics in 2006.

== Plot ==
German soldiers and SS Einsatzkommandos are being slowly killed off in a mysterious castle (the "keep" of the title) high in the Carpathian Mountains of Romania in April 1941. Theodor Cuza, a Jewish history professor living in Bucharest, and his daughter Magda are brought to the keep by SS Sturmbannfuhrer Erich Kaempffer in a desperate attempt to determine what is murdering his men. Cuza is later tasked with defeating the unknown evil that is wreaking havoc. The professor translates a mysterious message written in blood on a wall that uses a forgotten dialect of Old Romanian or Old Slavonic.

The entity responsible for the deaths calls itself "Molasar", and it finds Professor Cuza useful. Molasar procures his services through deception and false promises, and even puts the scleroderma from which he suffers into remission so he can work for Molasar — who is later revealed to be Rasalom, an ancient sorcerer from the "First Age" of humans.

An immortal man calling himself Glenn, whose real name is Glaeken, is a reluctant champion of the ancient Forces of Light. He becomes aware of Rasalom's activity from across the world and travels to the keep. He built the keep as a prison for Rasalom, out of the reluctance to kill him outright. The two beings are mystically linked in a way that binds their destinies together, even though Rasalom's growing mystical powers are vastly greater than Glenn's own. To keep him from ever forgetting his mission, the Forces of Light had taken away his reflection.

Magda and Glenn meet and develop a romantic relationship. Professor Cuza manipulates the Germans into arresting Glenn and bringing him into the keep, where he will be vulnerable to Rasalom. Inside the keep, the German soldiers riddle Glenn's body with bullets. Magda brings Glenn his mystical sword, the source of his power, which enables him to heal his mortal wounds. Rasalom instructs Professor Cuza to remove the talisman that imprisons him and bury it outside the keep.

Magda leaves Glenn to recuperate, and tries to convince her misguided father not to cross the perimeter of the fortress. Glenn arrives and joins the talisman to his sword, enabling him to drive Rasalom back into the depths of the keep. Rasalom then uses his telekinetic abilities to launch an overwhelming assault against Glenn. Rasalom rashly launches himself bodily at his age-old enemy and is reduced to ashes by a single stroke from Glenn's sword. Glenn plummets onto the craggy rocks below. He awakens to discover that he is now mortal, having vanquished his long-time foe, and he and Magda reunite.

== Composition ==
In answer to a claim that Tolkien's The Lord of the Rings was an influence on The Keep, Wilson responded:

First off, I'm not a fan of LotR – I struggled through it once as a teen (skimming a lot) and never looked back. [...] The influences on The Keep were Ludlum, R. E. Howard, and Lovecraft.

== Adaptations ==
Comic book cover art

The book was adapted into a film by Michael Mann for Paramount in 1983. The film was a critical and financial disaster but retains a cult following, partly due to Tangerine Dream's work on the soundtrack, stories surrounding the film's troubled production, and significant studio interference that most notably reduced the film from an unreleased 210-minute cut to a theatrical 96-minute cut. Wilson has publicly expressed his disapproval of the film on several occasions. Wilson has described the film as "visually intriguing, but otherwise utterly incomprehensible." (One critical change in the film was of Glaeken's sword to some sort of quarterstaff.) Another notable difference in the film's conclusion is that Glaeken is pulled into the same illuminated portal as Molasar, implying the end of Glaeken.

A board game adaptation of the film by Mayfair Games was released in 1983.

The film was also adapted into an Advanced Dungeons & Dragons-compatible ("generic universal") module, The Keep, by Mayfair Games in 1984. (Note that it was not an official Advanced Dungeons & Dragons product.)

In 2006 the novel was adapted into comic book form by Wilson himself, with art by Matthew Smith. In contrast to his feelings on the movie, Wilson has stated that he prefers this adaptation and considers it what the movie should have been, which is why he scripted the series for the comics. Comic Book Daily said: "Overall story, pacing, character development are all well done". The comic was re-released in a new edition in 2021.
