= The Adversary Cycle =

Series of seven novels written by American author F. Paul Wilson

The Adversary Cycle is a series of seven novels written by American author F. Paul Wilson. It was originally known as The Nightworld Cycle. John Clute, commenting on F. Paul Wilson's work in The Encyclopedia of Science Fiction, made several references to "the Adversary." Wilson, liking this, renamed the cycle.

== Published series ==
- The Keep, July 1981, ISBN 0-688-00626-4
- The Tomb, November 1984, ISBN 0-425-07295-9
- The Touch, April 1986, ISBN 0-399-13144-2
- Reborn, May 1990, ISBN 0-913165-52-2
- Reprisal, August 1991, ISBN 0-913165-59-X
- Nightworld, May 1992, ISBN 0-450-53665-3
- Signalz, July 2020, ISBN 978-1-951510-43-5

== Series arc ==
Wilson's website suggests an order of The Keep, Reborn, The Touch, The Tomb, Reprisal, Signalz, and Nightworld.

The Tomb and The Touch were initially written as standalone novels. it is only in Nightworld that they were retroactively made part of the Cycle, as their respective protagonists all come together to fight the final battle against the Otherness.

These seven books make up the "core" of "The Adversary Cycle", many more novels and short stories tie into the series. The Tomb, for example, is also the start of the Repairman Jack series of novels, which would become entwined with the Adversary Cycle. These books take place in the last three years before Nightworld and include some of the main characters from the original Adversary Cycle. This is all part of the "Grand Unification" theme of Wilson's works known as The Secret History of the World.
