= Hosts (novel) =

2001 thriller by F. Paul Wilson

- Author: F. Paul Wilson
- Series: Repairman Jack
- Genre: Thriller
- Publisher: Forge
- Publication date: October 12, 2001
- Pages: 384
- ISBN: 978-0-312-87866-5
- Preceded by: All the Rage

Hosts is a 2001 thriller novel by F. Paul Wilson.

Written by F. Paul Wilson, Hosts is a thriller novel in the Repairman Jack series, and follows All the Rage. In it, protagonist Jack investigates the cult that his sister's lover—Jeannette—has joined: the Unity. Jeannette had received a tainted experimental viral vector treatment for a brain tumor; the virus gained sentience, is the driving factor behind the cult, and attempting to spread itself worldwide. Further plots involve Jack's sister's coming out and Jack avoiding a journalist and any ensuing publicity.

Hosts (ISBN 978-0-312-87866-5) was published by Forge on October 12, 2001.

Publishers Weekly anticipated Wilson's fans to enjoy the novel and the further humanization of Jack.
