= F. Paul Wilson =

American author (born 1946)

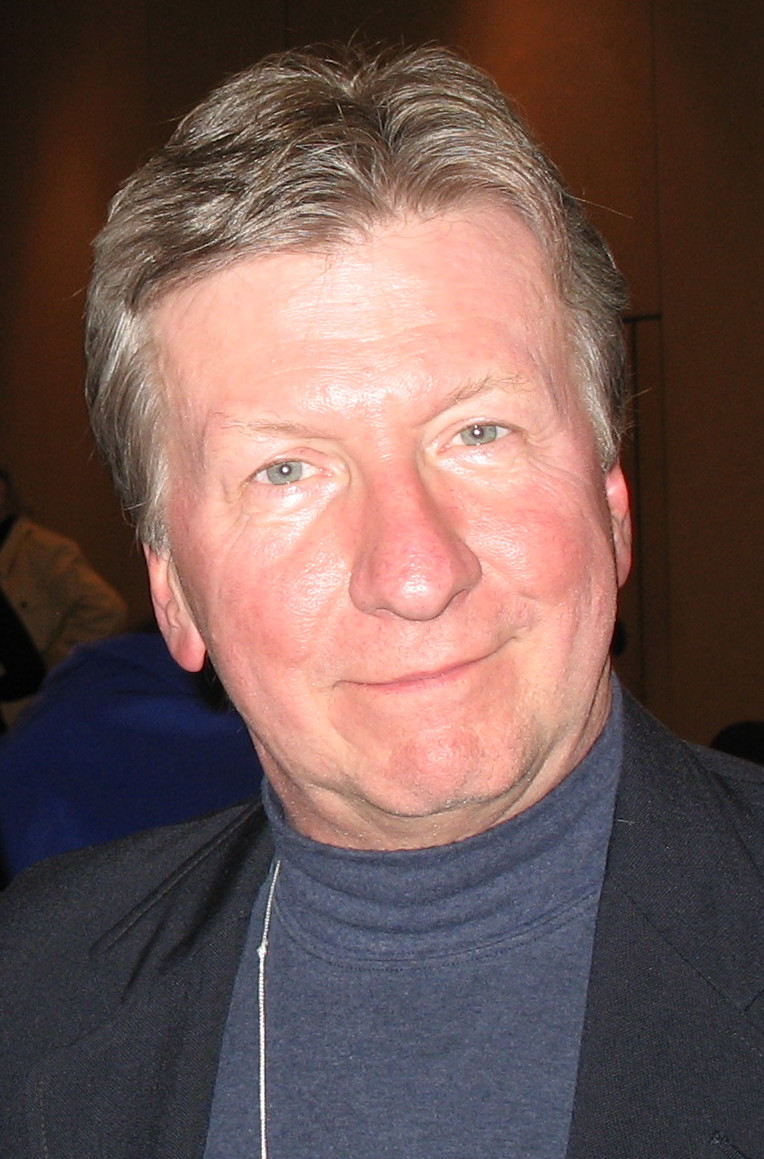
- Wilson in 2007
- Born: Francis Paul Wilson; May 17, 1946 (age 80); Jersey City, New Jersey, U.S.
- Occupation: Writer
- Writing career
- Period: 1976–present
- Genres: Science fiction, horror
- Notable awards: Prometheus Award; 1979 Wheels Within Wheels; Prometheus Award; 2004 Sims; Prometheus Hall of Fame Award; 2004 Lipidleggin'; Inkpot Award; 2007

Francis Paul Wilson (born May 17, 1946) is an American author of horror, adventure, medical thrillers, and science fiction. His books include the Repairman Jack novels—including Ground Zero, The Tomb, and Fatal Error—the Adversary cycle—including The Keep—and a young adult series featuring the teenage Jack. Wilson has won the Prometheus Award, the Bram Stoker Award, the Inkpot Award from the San Diego ComiCon, and the Lifetime Achievement Award of the Horror Writers of America, among other honors. He lives in Wall, New Jersey.

== Career ==
Wilson made his first sales in 1970 to Analog while still in medical school (graduating in 1973), and continued to write science fiction throughout the seventies. His debut novel was Healer (1976). In 1981, he ventured into the horror genre with the international bestseller The Keep, which was adapted into a film in 1983. In the 1990s, he moved from science fiction and horror to medical thrillers and interactive scripting for Disney Interactive and other multimedia companies. He, along with Matthew J. Costello, created and scripted FTL Newsfeed, which ran daily on the Sci-Fi Channel from 1992 to 1996.

Among Wilson's best-known characters is the anti-hero Repairman Jack, an urban mercenary introduced in the 1984 New York Times bestseller The Tomb. Unwilling to start a series character at the time, Wilson refused to write a second Repairman Jack novel until Legacies in 1998. Since then he has written one per year along with side trips into vampire fiction (the retro Midnight Mass), science fiction (Sims), and even a New Age thriller (The Fifth Harmonic). Current book sales are around six million.

Throughout his writing – especially in his earlier science fiction works (most notably An Enemy of the State) – Wilson has included explicitly libertarian political philosophy which extends to his "Repairman Jack" series. He won the first Prometheus Award in 1979 for his novel Wheels Within Wheels and another in 2004 for Sims. The Libertarian Futurist Society has also honored Wilson with their Hall of Fame Award for Healer (in 1990) and An Enemy of the State (in 1991). In 2015 he received the third special Prometheus Award for Lifetime Achievement; the previous two recipients were Poul Anderson and Vernor Vinge. In 2021, his "Lipidleggin'" won the Prometheus Hall of Fame Award.

Wilson is a noted fan of H. P. Lovecraft.

Why? Because HPL is special to me.
Donald A. Wollheim is to blame. He started me on Lovecraft. It was 1959. I was just a kid, a mere thirteen years old when he slipped me my first fix. I was a good kid up till then, reading Ace Doubles and clean, wholesome science fiction stories by the likes of Heinlein, E. E. Smith, Poul Anderson, Fred Pohl, and the rest. But he brought me down with one anthology. He knew what he was doing. He called it The Macabre Reader and slapped this lurid neato cool Ed Emshwiller cover on it. I couldn't resist. I bought it. I read it. And that was it. The beginning of my end.

Like other American science fiction writers directly or indirectly influenced by Campbell's view of the genre as a literature of ideas, Wilson makes use of his work to explore trends and technologies speculatively as they manifest. A prominent example is his novel An Enemy of the State (published in 1980), which was written during the 1970s, an era that saw stagflation develop in the U.S. economy. Throughout the book, Wilson runs chapter headings quoting from economic works such as Fiat Money Inflation in France and KYFHO, a kind of anarchic philosophy that he invented as model for a perfect society. The protagonist La Nague was born on Tolive, where the philosophy led to a government described in detail in "The Healer".

The Keep was later made into a movie. Wilson said in 2003 that there was talk of a film based on a Repairman Jack novel.

Hate to say it (being a devout believer in Murphy's law), but The Tomb looks like it's on its way to being filmed this year. Last October, after seven years of development, numerous options, five screenwriters, and eight scripts, Beacon Films (Air Force One, Thirteen Days, Spy Game, etc.) finally bought film rights. Disney/Touchstone/Buena Vista will be partnering and distributing the film here and abroad. The film will be called Repairman Jack (the idea is to make him a franchise character).

His short stories "Foet", "Traps", and "Lipidleggin'" were filmed as short films and collected on the DVD OTHERS: The Tales of F. Paul Wilson.

His short story "Pelts" was adapted into the season 2 episode of Masters of Horror titled "Pelts".

Short stories "Definitive Therapy" (published in The Further Adventures of The Joker) and "Hunters" (published in Soft and Others) were adapted as short films.

In January 2012, Wilson began writing for the tech website Byte, mostly in the persona of Repairman Jack.

== Personal life ==
Wilson has been a resident of Wall Township, New Jersey. He is a practicing physician as a Doctor of Osteopathic Medicine.

== Bibliography ==
=== The Adversary Cycle ===
- The Keep (1981), ISBN 0-688-00626-4
- The Tomb (1984), ISBN 0-425-07295-9 (re-released in 2004 under its original title, Rakoshi, by Borderlands Press)
- The Touch (1986), ISBN 0-399-13144-2
- Reborn (1990), ISBN 0-913165-52-2 (revised edition in 2009)
- Reprisal (1991), ISBN 0-913165-59-X (revised edition in 2011)
- Nightworld (1992), ISBN 0-450-53665-3 (revised edition in 2012)
- Signalz (2020) (a prelude to Nightworld)

=== Repairman Jack ===
1. "Fix" (novella) (with J.A. Konrath and Ann Voss Peterson)
2. The Tomb (1984), ISBN 0-425-07295-9 (re-released in 2004 under its original title, Rakoshi, by Borderlands Press)
3. "A Day in the Life" (short story) (1989) (available in The Barrens and Others and Quick Fixes- Tales of Repairman Jack)
4. "The Last Rakosh" (1990) (later incorporated into All The Rage, then in 2006 as revised hardcover and paperback editions; also available in Quick Fixes- Tales of Repairman Jack)
5. "The Long Way Home" (short story; available in Quick Fixes- Tales of Repairman Jack) (1992)
6. "Home Repairs" (short story) (1996) (later incorporated into Conspiracies; also available in Quick Fixes- Tales of Repairman Jack)
7. "The Wringer" (short story) (1996) (later incorporated into Fatal Error; also available in Quick Fixes- Tales of Repairman Jack)
8. Legacies (1998), ISBN 0-7472-1703-3
9. Conspiracies (1999), ISBN 0-312-86797-2
10. All The Rage (2000), ISBN 0-312-86796-4
11. Hosts (2001), ISBN 0-312-87866-4
12. The Haunted Air (2002), ISBN 0-312-87868-0
13. Gateways (2003), ISBN 0-7653-0690-5
14. Crisscross (2004), ISBN 0-7653-0691-3
15. Infernal (2005), ISBN 0-7653-1275-1
16. Harbingers (2006), ISBN 0-7653-1276-X
17. "Interlude at Duane's" (short story) (2006) (available in the James Patterson–edited anthology Thriller, Aftershock and Others, and in Quick Fixes- Tales of Repairman Jack)
18. "Infernal Night" (short story) (with Heather Graham) (available in FaceOff, and also independently published)
19. Bloodline (2007), ISBN 0-7653-1706-0
20. "Do-Gooder" (short short) (2007) (a 200-copy limited one-sheet "short short"; available in Quick Fixes- Tales of Repairman Jack)
21. By The Sword (2008), ISBN 0-7653-1707-9
22. Ground Zero (2009), ISBN 978-0-7653-2281-4
23. "Recalled" (short story) (2009) (available in Richard Matheson tribute book He is Legend as a crossover with Matheson's "The Distributor"; also available in Quick Fixes- Tales of Repairman Jack)
24. Fatal Error (2010), ISBN 978-1-934267-18-9
25. The Dark at the End (2011), ISBN 978-0-7653-2283-8
26. Quick Fixes- Tales of Repairman Jack (contains "A Day in the Life", "The Last Rakosh", "Home Repairs", "The Long Way Home", "The Wringer", "Interlude at Duane's", "Do-Gooder", "Recalled", "and "Piney Power") (2011), ISBN 978-1-4611-9074-5
27. The heavily revised (2012) version of Nightworld is styled as "a Repairman Jack novel" and marks the end of the RJ and Adversary cycles.
28. "Santa Jack: (short story) (2013) (excerpted from Legacies)
29. The Last Christmas (2019, an interlude that takes place between Ground Zero and Fatal Error

=== Young Repairman Jack ===
1. Secret Histories (young adult novel) (2008)
2. Secret Circles (young adult novel) (2010)
3. Secret Vengeance (young adult novel) (2011)

=== Early Repairman Jack ===
1. Cold City (2012)
2. Dark City (2013)
3. Fear City (2014)

=== LaNague Federation ===
1. Healer (1976), ISBN 0-385-11548-2 (reprinted in 2005, includes "To Fill the Sea and Air" ISBN 0-9766544-1-5)
2. Wheels Within Wheels (1978), ISBN 0-385-14397-4 (revised/reprinted in 2005, includes "Higher Centers" and "The Man with the Anteater" ISBN 0-9766544-3-1)
3. An Enemy of the State (1980), ISBN 0-385-15422-4 (reprinted in 2005, includes "Lipidleggin'" and "Ratman" ISBN 0-9766544-2-3)
4. Dydeetown World (1989), ISBN 0-671-69828-1
5. The Tery (1990), ISBN 0-671-69855-9 (revised in 2006, ISBN 1-892950-32-4)
- The LaNague Chronicles (1992), ISBN 0-671-72139-9 (includes An Enemy of the State, Wheels Within Wheels and Healer)
- The Complete LaNague (2013) (includes "Lipidleggin’", An Enemy of the State, Dydeetown World, The Tery, "To Fill the Sea and Air", "The Man with the Anteater", "Higher Centers", Wheels Within Wheels, "Ratman", and Healer)

=== Nocturnia Chronicles ===
1. Definitely Not Kansas (2015) (with Thomas F. Monteleone)
2. Family Secrets (2016) (with Thomas F. Monteleone)
3. The Silent Ones (2018) (with Thomas F. Monteleone)

=== The ICE Sequence ===
1. Panacea (2016)
2. The God Gene (2018)
3. The Void Protocol (2019)

=== Other novels ===
- Black Wind (1988)
- Sibs (1991) (U.S.) / Sister Night (1993) (U.K.)
- Select (aka The Foundation) (1993)
- Implant (1995) (writing as Colin Andrews)
- Virgin (1996) (writing as Mary Elizabeth Murphy)
- Mirage (1996) (with Matthew J. Costello)
- Deep as the Marrow (1997) (writing as Colin Andrews)
- Nightkill (1997) (with Steven Spruill) (some editions show "Steve Lyon")
- Masque (1998) (with Matthew J. Costello) (note: ebook release has been retitled DNA Wars)
- The Fifth Harmonic (2003)
- Artifact (2003) (with Kevin J. Anderson, Janet Berlinger and Matthew J. Costello)
- Midnight Mass (2004)
- The Peabody-Ozymandias Traveling Circus & Oddity Emporium (2007) (an expansion to his short fiction version in the FPW-edited anthology Freak Show)
- The Proteus Cure (2013) (with Tracy L. Carbone)
- A Necessary End (2014) (with Sarah Pinborough)
- Duad Series
  - Double Threat (2021)
  - Double Dose (2022)
- Rx series (writing as Nina Abbott)
  - Rx Murder (2021)
  - Rx Mayhem (2022)
- The Hidden series
  - The Upwelling (2024)
  - Lexie (2024)

=== Short story collections ===
- Soft and Others (1989)
- Ad Statum Perspicuum (1990)
- The Barrens and Others (1998)
- Sims (2003)
- A Little Beige Book of Non-Descript Stories (2004)
- Aftershock & Others (2009)
- Secret Stories: Tales from the Secret History (2019)
- Other Sandboxes (2024)

=== Uncollected short fiction ===
- Nyro Fiddles (1992)
- The Lord's Work (1992)
- Winter Quarters (1992)
- The Pine Barrens, NJ (1992)
- Good Friday (1999)
- Feral (2003)
- Sermon (2004) (with John B. Ford)
- The Tapeworm Letters (2004)
- Riding the R (2007)
- The Sound of Blunder (2008)
- Wayward Pines: The Widow Lindley (2013)
- The Dead World (2013)
- Renascence (2014) (with Rhodi Hawk)
- Astraphobia (2015)
- The Adventure of the Abu Qir Sapphire (2018)
- The Compendium of Srem (2018)
- The Long and the Short of It (2018)
- Wardenclyffe (2018)
- To the Lonely Sea and the Sky (2020)
- The Last Bonneville (2023)

=== Anthologies ===
- Freak Show (1992)
- Diagnosis: Terminal (1996)

== Awards ==
| Work | Year & Award | Category | Result | Ref. |
|---|---|---|---|---|
| Wheels Within Wheels | 1979 Prometheus Award | Novel | Won | |
| Green Winter | 1981 Analog Award | Short Story | Won | |
| The Keep | 1982 Balrog Awards | Novel | Nominated | |
| The Keep | 1982 Locus Award | Fantasy Novel | Nominated | |
| An Enemy of the State | 1982 Prometheus Award | Novel | Finalist | |
| An Enemy of the State | 1991 Prometheus Award | Hall of Fame Award | Won | |
| The Tomb | 1985 Prometheus Award | SF Novel | Finalist | |
| Dydeetown Girl | 1987 Locus Award | Novella | Nominated | |
| Dydeetown Girl | 1987 Nebula Award | Novella | Nominated | |
| Day-Tay-Vao | 1987 Bram Stoker Award | Short Fiction | Nominated | |
| Traps | 1987 Bram Stoker Award | Short Fiction | Nominated | |
| Black Wind | 1988 Bram Stoker Award | Novel | Nominated | |
| Wires | 1989 Locus Award | Novella | Nominated | |
| Soft and Others | 1989 Bram Stoker Award | Fiction Collection | Nominated | |
| Pelts | 1990 Bram Stoker Award | Long Fiction | Nominated | |
| Healer | 1990 Prometheus Award | Hall of Fame Award | Won | |
| The Barrens | 1991 World Fantasy Award | Novella | Nominated | |
| The Tery | 1992 Prometheus Award | Novel | Finalist | |
| Freak Show | 1993 World Fantasy Award | Anthology | Nominated | |
| Masque | 1999 Prometheus Award | SF Novel | Finalist | |
| After Shock | 1999 Bram Stoker Award | Short Fiction | Won | |
| Dydeetown World | 1999 Seiun Award | Translated Long Work | Nominated | |
| The Christmas Thingy | 2000 Bram Stoker Award | Work for Young Readers | Nominated | |
| Hosts | 2002 Prometheus Award | Novel | Finalist | |
| The Haunted Air | 2003 Prometheus Award | Novel | Finalist | |
| Sims | 2004 Prometheus Award | Novel | Won | |
| Harbingers | 2007 Prometheus Award | Novel | Finalist | |
| A Necessary End | 2013 Bram Stoker Award | Novel | Nominated | |
| Lipidleggin | 2021 Prometheus Award | Hall of Fame Award | Won | |
| Fear City | 2015 Killer Nashville Awards | Silver Falchion Award - Speculative/Horror/Science Fiction/Fantasy) | Won | |
| Double Dose | 2024 Dragon Awards | Horror Novel | Nominated | |
| | 1999 Inkpot Award | | Won | |
| | 2005 World Horror Convention Grand Master Award | | Won | |
| | 2007 Inkpot Award | | Won | |
| | 2009 Bram Stoker Award | Lifetime Achievement | Won | |
| | 2015 Prometheus Award | Special Prometheus Award for Lifetime Achievement | Won | |
