= Homeland (Doctorow novel) =

2013 novel by Cory Doctorow

HOMELAND
- Author: Cory Doctorow
- Language: English
- Subject: Terrorism, cryptography, computer hackers, Department of Homeland Security, privacy, police state, dystopian young adult fiction
- Genre: Fiction / Cyberpunk
- Publisher: Tor Teen
- Publication date: February 5, 2013
- Publication place: United States
- Media type: Book
- Pages: 400
- ISBN: 978-0-7653-3369-8
- Preceded by: Little Brother
- Followed by: "Lawful Interception" / Attack Surface

Homeland is a novel by Cory Doctorow, published by Tor Books. It is a sequel to Doctorow's earlier novel, Little Brother. It was released in hardback on February 5, 2013, and subsequently released for download under a Creative Commons (CC-BY-NC-ND) license on Doctorow's website two weeks later on February 19, 2013.

The novel includes two afterword essays by computer security researcher and hacker Jacob Appelbaum, and computer programmer and Internet activist Aaron Swartz.

== Characters ==
- Marcus Yallow—Main protagonist, he is a college dropout who previously led the charge against the Department of Homeland Security in Little Brother.
- Angela Carvelli (Ange)—Marcus's girlfriend.
- Joseph Noss—Independent candidate for the California State Senate. After being introduced by Mitch Kapor at Burning Man, Joe eventually employs Marcus as CTO of his campaign.
- Carrie Johnstone—Main antagonist, Johnstone is now head of security at Zyz, a fictional military contractor.
- Masha—Now a friend of Marcus who gives him the documents about Carrie Johnstone's dirty work as leverage against Carrie
- Jolu (José Luis)—One of Marcus's friends who helps him as he attempts to distribute the contents of the USB drive that Masha gives to him.

== Dedications ==
Homeland is dedicated to Doctorow's wife and daughter, Alice and Poesy. As in Little Brother, Doctorow also dedicates each e-book chapter of Homeland to a different bookstore: Chapters/Indigo, BakkaPhoenix Books, Barnes & Noble, Wild Rumpus, University Book Store at the University of Washington, Mysterious Galaxy, Anderson's Bookshops, Borderlands Books, The Tattered Cover, Uncle Hugo's, RiverRun Bookstore, Gibson's Bookstore, Busboys and Poets, Politics and Prose, Books of Wonder, Powell's Books, Amazon, Forbidden Planet.

== DMCA takedown ==
In May 2013, 20th Century Fox sent a DMCA takedown request to Google to remove links to Cory Doctorow's novel Homeland, on the basis that 20th Century Fox owns an unrelated TV series with the same title.

When contacted by TorrentFreak, Doctorow expressed that he was "incandescent with rage" and jokingly added "BRING ME THE SEVERED HEAD OF RUPERT MURDOCH!"

== Influence ==
In 2013, filmmaker Laura Poitras was reading Homeland while communicating with a source that was actually whistleblower Edward Snowden. When she met him in The Mira Hotel in Hong Kong, she gave him a copy that he took in his trip ending with exile in Russia. The book can be seen in his room as he packs in her documentary film CitizenFour.
