= The Masque of the Red Death in popular culture =

Edgar Allan Poe's 1842 short story "The Masque of the Red Death" has been depicted and referenced numerous times in popular culture.

== Literature ==
- In The Phantom of the Opera by Gaston Leroux, Erik appears at the masquerade dressed as the Red Death.
- Jack London's novella The Scarlet Plague (1912) was inspired in part by Poe's story. In the book, much of humanity has been wiped out by a disease sometimes referred to as "Red Death".
- Stephen King's novel The Shining contains allusions to the story. For example, the repeated line "and the red death held sway over all" explicitly references the final line of Poe's story, as noted in the book by the character Jack Torrance. In The Dark Tower series' sixth novel, Song of Susannah, Mia mentions an epidemic called the "Red Death" that ravaged the city of Fedic; Susannah makes the connection to Poe's short story.
- In Tom Wolfe's novel The Bonfire of the Vanities, the story is referenced in a speech given at a socialite's party by an elderly British poet and house guest, rumored to be afflicted with AIDS.
- In the 374th issue of the comic book series "Journey Into Mystery", the story is quoted and referenced while Thor is burning bodies of dead mutants as a way to honor them after learning that he has been banished from Hel and could never die.
- In Neil Gaiman's 1996 novel Neverwhere, a minor character briefly mentions the story "The Masque of the Red Death" when describing a fancy event at a museum.
- Death in Terry Pratchett's Discworld novels references the story several times; in Maskerade (which pastiches Phantom of the Opera, see below), he wears a Red Death costume at the book's climax. In The Light Fantastic, Death consoles himself after being summoned from an enjoyable party, noting that it was going to go downhill at midnight – as that is when everyone would have expected him to take his mask off.
- The Chuck Palahniuk novel Haunted begins with a quote from "The Masque of the Red Death". Also, several of the rooms are colored with themes that reflect the story.
- In the Dan Simmons novel The Terror, an elaborate Carnivale and masque is staged outdoors by the crew of two ice-locked ships. The crew builds a series of multi-colored compartments for the event out on the ice using the ships' rigging and different colored paints. A crew member thinks of this idea from incompletely remembering a story by Poe he read in a magazine.
- The last chapter of Valerio Evangelisti's novel Il corpo e il sangue di Eymerich (The Body and the Blood of Eymerich) shares the story's title and retells its plot almost literally in the context of the book.
- The second installment of the limited comic series Rocket Raccoon, "The Masque of the Red Breath", featured an insidious red cloud, the Red Breath, which attacked a masquerade and "erased" its victims from existence.
- In DC Comics, an alternate version of Bruce Wayne from a dark parallel universe becomes an anti-hero known as the Red Death. He wears a red suit with a stylized skull-like mask. After members of his family die, he steals the powers of the Speed Force from the Flash by absorbing his essence. Using his newfound super speed, the Red Death becomes a ruthless vigilante, murdering his rogues gallery and conquering his world. He is later recruited by The Batman Who Laughs to join the Dark Knights, other alternate evil versions of Bruce Wayne.
- Ray Bradbury's "Usher Two," one of the stories in The Martian Chronicles, is a blatant homage to Poe, and contains multiple references and plot points taken from Poe's works, including "The Fall of the House of Usher," "The Pit and the Pendulum," and "The Masque of the Red Death".
- White Wolf's trilogy Masquerade of the Red Death is named after and has some elements based on the story.
- Masque of the Red Death — an erotic, science-fiction "decadent" re-telling of the original Poe story first in webcomic format, followed by graphic novel publication, by Wendy Pini.
- In Tom Clancy's 2002 novel Red Rabbit, the CIA formulates a long-term plan to destabilize Communism in the Soviet Union and hasten the end of the Cold War, codenamed "Masque of the Red Death".
- Cory Doctorow's 2019 novella collection Radicalized includes a story titled "Masque of the Red Death". Doctorow's story, like Poe's, follows a group of wealthy people attempting to survive a cataclysm by sealing themselves away in an isolated fortress, with disastrous results.

== Stage and screen ==
- A horror film called The Masque of the Red Death was shot in 1964 by Roger Corman. It incorporates a sub-plot based on another Poe tale, "Hop-Frog." The film stars Vincent Price, Hazel Court, Jane Asher and Patrick Magee. The film had a 1989 remake starring Adrian Paul.
- In Gaston Leroux's novel The Phantom of the Opera, Erik, the Phantom, attends a ball dressed as the Red Death with the inscription "Je suis la Mort Rouge qui passe!" ("I am the Red Death that passes") embroidered on his cloak in gold. The Red Death costume appears in the 1925 version, 1986 musical and 2004 film of the same name, though the 1925 movie and stage production are somewhat more accurate regarding his appearance, as he bears a large feathered hat and lengthy cloak as described in the novel, although both stage and screen costume bear skull masks. Neither appearance, however, shows the inscription. The 1987 animated film also shows the Red Death scene. In the 1989 film, starring Robert Englund, Erik is also dressed as the Red Death. On the cover of Sam Siciliano's The Angel of the Opera, Erik is dressed as the Red Death.

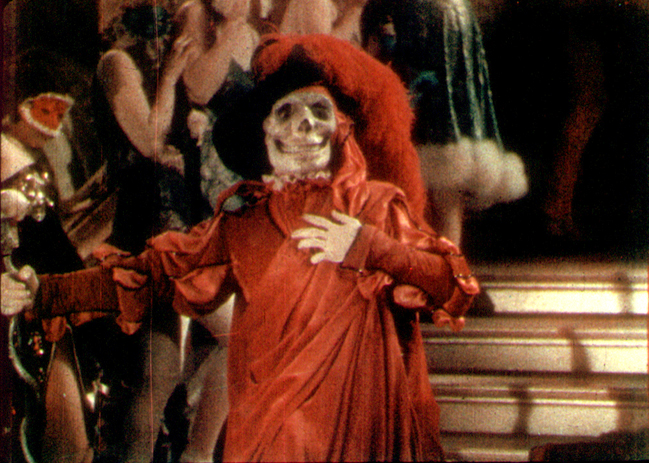
The Phantom of the Opera dressed as the Red Death in the 1925 film.

- The 1992 film Batman Returns directed by Tim Burton features a character dressed as the Red Death in the same fashion as the 1925 Phantom of the Opera at a masquerade ball.
- Thrax, the main antagonist of the 2001 animated/live-action comedy Osmosis Jones, is a virus identified as "La Muerte Rojo" or "The Red Death". He was voiced by Laurence Fishburne.
- In London, a production of The Red Death created by Punchdrunk productions and Battersea Arts Centre (BAC) ran from October 2007 to April 2008.
- Huayi Brothers Media and CKF Pictures in China announced in 2017 plans to produce a film of Akira Kurosawa's posthumous screenplay of "The Mask of the Red Death" for 2020.
- The 2023 Netflix horror television series The Fall of the House of Usher adapts the story for its second episode in a modern setting.

== Music ==
- The music video for Fishbone's "Party at Ground Zero" was directed by Henry Selick, future director of The Nightmare Before Christmas. The video is a homage of "The Masque of the Red Death", with "Death" bringing about a nuclear explosion when he removes his mask.
- Avant-Garde musical artist Diamanda Galás adopted "Masque of the Red Death" as the collective name for a trilogy of work consisting of the albums Saint of the Pit, The Divine Punishment and You Must Be Certain of the Devil.
- The German metal band Stormwitch has a song called "Masque of the Red Death" on their 1985 album "Tales Of Terror".
- The German punk band Feeling B produced the album Die Maske des Roten Todes (German: „The Masque of the Red Death“). It was released in 1993, and is named after a short story by Edgar Allan Poe.
- The American metal band Manilla Road made a song called "Masque of the Red Death" on their 1987 album Mystification.
- The American metal band Crimson Glory made a song called "Masque of the Red Death" on their 1988 album Transcendence.
- On the Norwegian gothic metal group Theatre of Tragedy's 1996 album Velvet Darkness They Fear, the fifth track, "And When He Falleth" includes several sections of Jane Asher and Vincent Price's dialogues from the 1964 film of The Masque of the Red Death.
- The lyrics in Eros Ramazzotti's song "Lettera al futuro" ("Letter to the future"), included on his 1996 album Dove c'è musica, tell the story's plot in a simplified form and compare Poe's plague to AIDS and various 'plagues' affecting today's world.
- The 2002 Thrice album The Illusion of Safety features a song titled "The Red Death", an interpretation of the story.
- Musician Ann Danielewski received her nickname, and later stage name, "Poe" after wearing a Red Death costume to a childhood Halloween party.
- The Swiss black metal band Samael made a song called "Mask of the Red Death" on their album Ceremony of Opposites.
- On the American band Tourniquet's album Vanishing Lessons, the equally named track quotes a passage from the story.
- Producer Winnie Waldron produced a version of Masque of the Red Death for the American radio drama series Radio Tales on National Public Radio; the program featured a full-length musical score by Winifred Phillips, who also narrated the story. In their Fall 1997 Quarterly Edition publication, NPR wrote, "Things get underway on an elegantly macabre note as Winifred Phillips performs Edgar Allan Poe's "Masque of the Red Death" to her original music score." In describing the program Benjamin H. Cheever of AudioFile Magazine wrote, "The music of Poe's text is amplified and clarified with sound effects and an original score."
- American singer Hana Pestle has a song entitled "The Red Death Ball" which contains a lyrical story that was inspired by the events that occur within The Masque of the Red Death.
- Nox Arcana has a song on their 2007 album Shadow of the Raven entitled "Masque of the Red Death", which is an organ and chorus themed musical interpretation of the Edgar Allan Poe story.
- New York shoegaze band Highspire references The Red Death in their song "Joke's On You" on their 2010 album "Aquatic."
- The song Deadly Masquerade by the Japanese visual kei band Sadie tells the story from the perspective of the guests at the ball.
- The French impressionist composer André Caplet composed Etude symphonique pour harpe chromatique principale and orchestra (1908) based upon Masque of the Red Death and revised it in 1923 to Conte fantastique d'après "Le Masque de la Mort Rouge" d'Edgar Allan Poe pour Harpe and string quartet.
- The 2011 orchestral composition Prospero's Rooms by the American composer Christopher Rouse depicts the narrative of the story musically.
- American funeral doom metal band Bell Witch wrote a song for their 2012 album Longing titled "Beneath the Mask", which uses sound clips from the 1964 film The Masque of the Red Death.
- American composer/violinist Edward W. Hardy composed a classical string quartet piece called "A Fantasy" inspired by The Masque of the Red Death.
- The story is the basis of an eponymous track, among other rap interpretations of famous literature, by MC Lars and Mega Ran on their 2019 record The Dewey Decibel System.

== Video games ==
- The 1994 computer game Under a Killing Moon featured interludes in which text slides containing lines of The Masque of the Red Death were narrated by James Earl Jones.
- The 1995 computer game The Dark Eye featured an abstract slide-show segment accompanying a reading of "The Masque of the Red Death" performed by William S. Burroughs. Some parts of the story were left out.
- The 2008 online game "Phantom Mansion: Spectrum of Souls" has the player rescue the trapped souls of the ill-fated masquerade from Poe's story using pushing puzzles and avoiding enemies to reach different areas of each of the colored chambers.
- The 2012 video game Dishonored includes the mission Lady Boyle's Last Party, which is loosely based on The Masque of the Red Death.
- The 2012 video game Crusader Kings II features an event referencing the story when you attempt to seclude your court from the Black Death.
- The 2014 video game Destiny features a weapon called The Red Death.
- The 2017 video game Persona 5 features a song titled "Beneath the Mask", containing the lyrics "I'm a shapeshifter, at Poe's masquerade" and "just a cage of bones, there's nothing inside", a reference to the story.
- Most games in the Persona series have the player visit a place called the "Velvet Room", another reference to the story.
- In one of the comics from the video game Overwatch, heavily making a reference to the novel, the character Reaper wears the Red Death costume.
- The 2020 computer game The Red Death featured the red death and shares the name in its title.
- The 2021 Virtual reality game: "I Expect You To Die 2" features a book in the two levels "Eaves Drop" and "Jet Set" that references the title of the book. There are also posters of the play in the mission "Stage Fright".
- The 2021 video game Vampire Survivors features an unlockable character 'The Mask of The Red Death' resembling a grim reaper with a red cloak and scythe. The character description is 'A blasphemous mockery'.
- In 2021 the 2018 video game Identity V released Essence 3 of Season 17, themed after the story, which features The S tier 'Man in Red' for the character, the Mercenary, along with the A tiers 'Runaway' for the Painter and 'Lurking Heart' for Soul Weaver.
- The video game Genshin Impact features a character named 'Arlecchino' who wields a scythe and has a key attack mechanic called 'Masque of the Red Death'.

== Other media ==
- In 1994, a Dungeons & Dragons role-playing game campaign setting was published under the name Masque of the Red Death as an offshoot of Ravenloft taking place on a version of Earth in the year 1890 with many elements from gothic fiction.
- The 1996 storyline Contagion that ran across Batman comics features a biological weapon unleashed in Gotham City, in response the cities' wealthy citizens seal themselves in an apartment tower only to find that they are trapped inside with the plague, paralleling Poe's story.
- The Paizo Pathfinder Adventure Path Curse of the Crimson Throne's second module, Seven Days to the Grave features a disease called blood veil that shares many features with the Red Death, most notably the sweating of blood. Furthermore, later in the same module, there is a plot of infecting nobles that had isolated themselves inside a manor, that seems heavily inspired by the plot of Masque of the Red Death.
- The October 20, 2008 issue of The New Yorker featured a Red Death character looming over stock traders in the New York Stock Exchange.
- The Warhammer Fantasy Battle setting has the story of the Masque of the Red Death occurring in the city of Mousillon in Bretonnia.
- In the series Beetlejuice, the fourth-season episode "Poe Pourri" has Beetlejuice encountering "The Mask of Dead Breath" a giant floating face mask who coughs upon Beetlejuice. However, instead of red death, he suffers a terrible cold.
- The 2013 Doctor Who episode "The Crimson Horror" features a chemical substance produced by an alien parasite which seems to produce the same effects within humans as that of the actual disease.
- In 2018, IDW Games released a board game titled "Masque of the Red Death" designed by Adam Wyse with art by Gris Grimsley based on Poe's story. In the game, players are guests at the masquerade trying to discover which rooms the Red Death will visit during the midnight hour, and trying to avoid the Red Death when it arrives.
- A Los Angeles Times op-ed noted that the White House COVID-19 outbreak, which was a large gathering at the White House for the nomination of Amy Coney Barrett, bears similarities to the plot of "The Masque of the Red Death".
- The 2022 Father Brown (2013 TV series) episode "The Red Death" features a death threat with the phrase "The Red Death is coming", a masquerade ball, and the murder of the Minister of Defence by a figure wearing a red skull mask.
- In 2023, Four Horsemen Studios released a Masque of the Red Death action figure through their Figura Obscura line.
