= Walkaway (Doctorow novel) =

2017 novel by Cory Doctorow

- Author: Cory Doctorow
- Cover artist: Will Staehle
- Language: English
- Subject: Dystopia, Utopia, oligarchy, surveillance, post-scarcity, alternative lifestyle, war
- Genre: Science fiction
- Publisher: Head of Zeus, Tor Books
- Publication date: April 25, 2017
- Publication place: United States
- Media type: Book (Hardcover, Paperback and E-Book)
- Pages: 384
- ISBN: 0-7653-9276-3
- Preceded by: Homeland
- Website: craphound.com/category/walkaway

Walkaway is a 2017 science fiction novel by Canadian writer Cory Doctorow, published by Head of Zeus and Tor Books.

Set in our near-future, it is a story of walking away from "non-work", and surveillance and control by a brutal, rich oligarchical elite; love and romance; a post-scarcity gift economy; revolution and eventual war; and a means of overcoming death.

== Summary ==
In a world of non-work, ruined by human-created climate change and pollution, and where people are under surveillance and ruled over by a mega-rich elite, Hubert, Etc., his friend Seth, and Natalie, decide that they have nothing to lose by turning their backs and walking away from the everyday world or "default reality", shortened to "Default".

The improvement of 3D printers over current real-world versions, as well as the invention of machines that can search for and reprocess waste or discarded materials, mean the characters no longer have need of Default for the basic essentials of life, such as food, clothing, and shelter.

As more and more people choose to "walkaway", the ruling elite do not take these social changes sitting down. They use the military, police and mercenaries to attack and disrupt the walkaways' new settlements.

One thing that the elite are especially interested in is scientific research that the walkaways are carrying out which could potentially put an end to death, which results in general revolution within Default and eventual war with walkaway settlements.

== Main characters ==
- Hubert Espinoza, better known as "Hubert, Etc" because of his nineteen middle names. Aged 27.
- Seth: A friend of Hubert, Etc., who was "terrified of aging out of the beautiful children demographic and entering the world of non-work."
- Natalie Redwater: Born into an elite family, she convinces Hubert, Etc., and Seth to walk away from the everyday world of "Default".

== Reception ==
Writing on NPR online, Jason Sheehan is of the opinion that Doctorow's writing is "super weird in the best possible way." Sheehan says that Walkaway is a remarkable "story of a utopia in progress, as messy as every new thing ever is, told in the form of people talking to each other, arguing with each other and working together to solve problems. It's all about the deep, disturbing, recognizable weirdness of the future that must come from the present we have already made for ourselves, trying to figure out what went wrong and what comes next."

In The Verge, Adi Robertson writes: "Walkaway imagines a future shaped by the same problems and possibilities Doctorow's been playing with for years: the threat of ubiquitous surveillance and artificial scarcity, and the promise that almost any technology can be repurposed and turned against its creator". Robertson goes on to say that "one of Doctorow's core themes in Walkaway is subverting what he described as the popular 'man against man against nature' pulp plot."

In Ars Technica, Sean Gallagher writes that "the future is open source in this optimistic sci-fi disaster epic full of big ideas." He and Doctorow see Walkaway as a prequel to the author's debut novel Down and Out in the Magic Kingdom. Gallagher concludes that Walkaway "shows us a world trying to make things right after having made all the wrong decisions about how to use technology. But Walkaway executes that move beautifully. And like all great performances, it's worth witnessing over and over again."
