= With a Little Help =

2010 collection of short stories and novellas by Cory Doctorow

- First edition
- Author: Cory Doctorow
- Cover artist: Pablo Defendini
- Language: English
- Genre: Science fiction
- Publication date: October 11, 2010
- Publication place: United States
- ISBN: 1-4565-7634-8

With a Little Help: An Experiment in Publishing (CreateSpace, 2010, ISBN 1-4565-7634-8) is a collection consisting of mostly previously published science fiction short stories and novellas by Cory Doctorow, with one new short story. This is Doctorow's third published collection, following Overclocked: Stories of the Future Present. Each story includes an afterword by the author, and the anthology includes an introduction by Jonathan Coulton and an afterword by Russell Galen.

The book is notable for being published under the author's own imprint, rather than with a traditional book publisher, and for its DRM-free digital audiobook and ebook editions being sold on a name-your-own-price basis, with the revenue from the book being publicly disclosed on the author's website.

== Contents ==
- "Introduction," by Jonathan Coulton
- "The Things That Make Me Weak and Strange Get Engineered Away" (Locus Award Finalist for Novelette, 2009)
- "The Right Book"
- "Other People's Money"
- "Scroogled"
- "Human Readable" (Locus Recommended Reading List (Novellas), 2005)
- "Liberation Spectrum"
- "Power Punctuation!"
- "Visit the Sins"
- "Constitutional Crisis"
- "Pester Power"
- "Chicken Little"
- "Epoch"
- "I'm Only In It For the Money," by Russell Galen
