= Eastern Standard Tribe =

2004 science fiction novel by Cory Doctorow

- Author: Cory Doctorow
- Cover artist: Shelley Eshkar
- Language: English
- Genre: Science fiction
- Publisher: Tor Books
- Publication date: 1 March 2004
- Publication place: Canada
- Media type: Print (Hardback & Paperback)
- Pages: 224
- ISBN: 0-7653-0759-6 (Hardcover), ISBN 0-7653-1045-7 (Paperback)
- OCLC: 52901604
- Dewey Decimal: 813/.6 22
- LC Class: PS3604.O27 E23 2004

Eastern Standard Tribe is a 2004 science fiction novel by Canadian writer Cory Doctorow. Like Doctorow's first two books, the entire text was released under a Creative Commons license on Doctorow's website, allowing the whole text of the book to be read for free and distributed without the publisher's permission.

== Plot summary ==
The novel takes place in a world where online "tribes" form, where all members set their circadian rhythms to the same time zone even though members may be physically located throughout the world.

The protagonist, Art Berry, has been sent to an insane asylum as a result of a complex conspiracy. Told mostly in flashbacks, Art explains that he works in London as a consultant for the Greenwich 0 tribe. In reality, though, both he and his associate Fede are double-agents for the Eastern Standard Tribe. Despite his talents as a human experience engineer, Art delivers subtly flawed proposals to the GMT tribe in order to undermine them and enable his own tribe to get a coveted contract.

He meets a girl, Linda, after he hits her with his car at 3am. Art has an idea for peer-to-peer music sharing between automobiles, and plans to give it to the EST (taking a cut to himself). However, his girlfriend meets his coworker, Fede, and they plan to double cross the EST and sell the idea to another tribe. Knowing Art will not approve of the plan, they do it behind his back.

Fede later claims he would have cut Art in on the deal afterwards. However, Art figures out what is going on, and as a result they have him committed to an insane asylum to protect their plot.

The book alternates between two points of view: Art meeting Linda in London, and Art in the asylum. The London plot culminates in his attack on Fede when he discovers his betrayal. The asylum plot takes place after his attack on Fede, and culminates in his escape from the asylum and founding of a new company to market health care products using his inside knowledge of psychiatric institutions.

== Literary significance and reception ==
Kirkus Reviews described this novel in their review as "A near-future yarn that would have worked better as a piece of speculative nonfiction." Regina Schroeder in reviewing for Booklist said that "Doctorow’s fast, bizarre follow-up to Down and Out in the Magic Kingdom is a reaction to the impact of instant global communication in which it is hard to tell whether the phenomena being reacted to have actually been observed or are the consequences of his imagination."

Don D'Ammassa in his review for Chronicle addressed satire in science fiction saying "There was a time when broad satires had an honored place in SF, but that has changed over the course of years, and now novelists have to slip their satire in around an otherwise serious story most of the time. Cory Doctorow pushes the envelope a bit, because very little of the present story is particularly serious, but the satire is done with so light a touch that it's not intrusive at all." He described the novel as "funny and superficially lightweight, but when you're done, you might find yourself subject to troubling afterthoughts."

== See also ==
- Time zone abolition
