= Information Doesn't Want to Be Free =

2014 non-fiction book by Cory Doctorow

- Author: Cory Doctorow
- Publisher: McSweeney's
- Publication date: 2014

Information Doesn't Want to Be Free is a 2014 non-fiction book by the science fiction writer and Internet activist Cory Doctorow. In the book, he advocates for loosening restrictions on intellectual property on the Internet. He states that "[i]nformation doesn't want to be free, ... people do."

Doctorow disagrees with claims by creators and creative industry representatives that downloading and streaming of content online (e.g., songs) is hurting creators and creative industries. Doctorow argues that a "free and open digital culture" provides a net benefit to society. Movie and music industries have tried to stop online pirated sharing of their content. Similarly, book authors have tried to prevent their texts from being made available on the Internet.

According to Doctorow, "an open Internet is like a musician or street performer busking on the street." If people passing by enjoy the performance, they put money in the hat. While some people will listen and then leave without putting money in the hat, enough fans will put money in the hat. Doctorow claims that this analogy will work on the Internet. He says that just because the Internet and computers facilitate the copying and posting of content online, this doesn't mean that users will pirate content. Doctorow argues that, rather than reducing piracy, digital locks on content provoke it.

== See also ==
- Creator economy
