= Abolition of time zones =

Replacing time zones with UTC

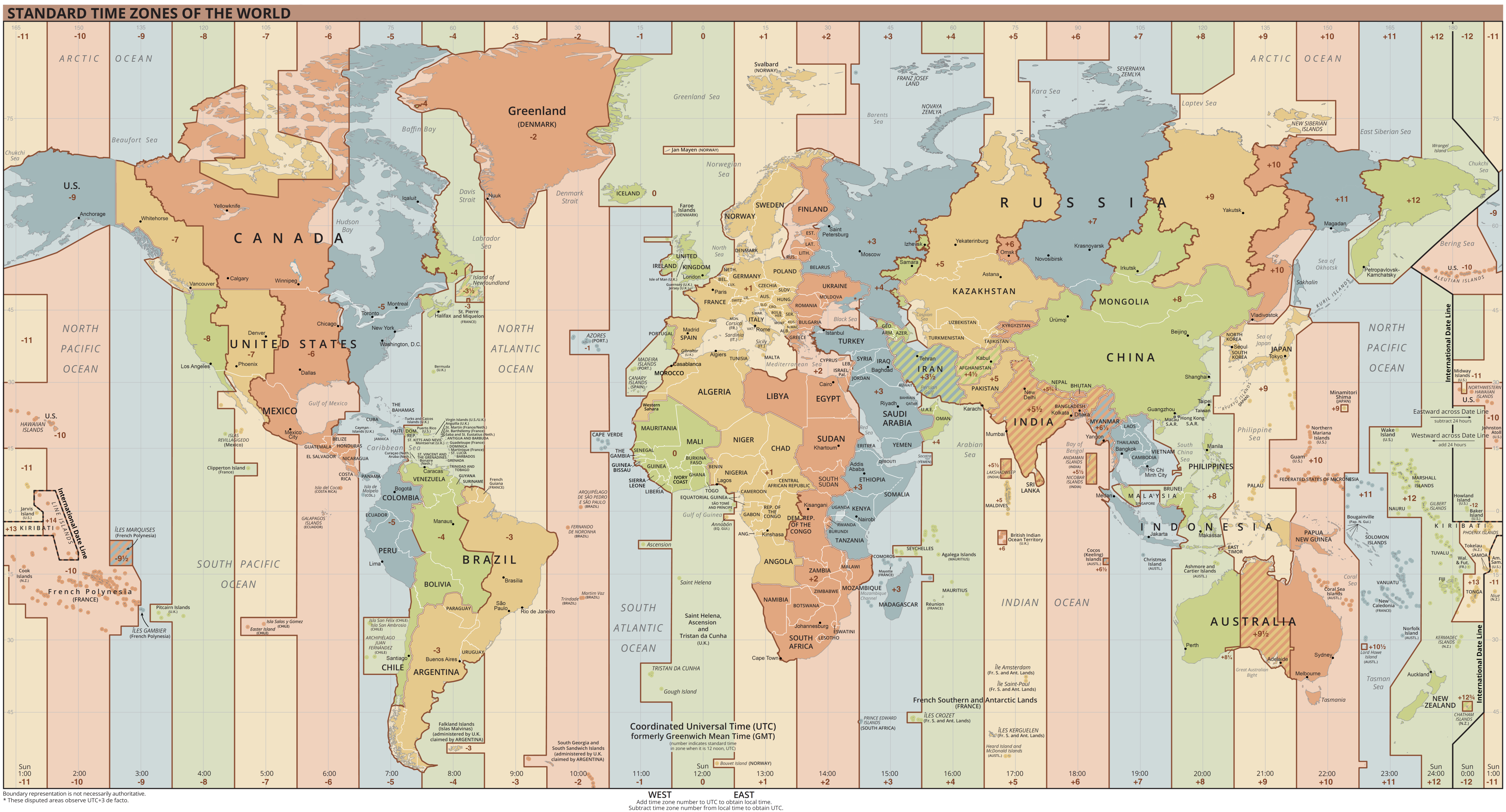
Time zones of the world

Various proposals have been made to replace the system of time zones based on offsets from Coordinated Universal Time (UTC) with UTC+00:00 as a local time globally.

== History ==
For most of history, the position of the sun was used for timekeeping. During the 19th century, most towns kept their own local time. The standardization of time zones started in 1884 in the US.

=== Proposals ===
The time-zone map is a hodgepodge — a jigsaw puzzle by Dalí.

— James Gleick, The New York Times

Arthur C. Clarke proposed the use of a single time zone in 1976. Attempts to abolish time zones date back half a century and include the Swatch Internet Time. Economics professor Steve Hanke and astrophysics professor Dick Henry at Johns Hopkins University have been proponents of the concept and have integrated it in their Hanke–Henry Permanent Calendar.

== Usage ==
UTC+00:00 as a universal time zone is already used by airline operators around the world and other international settings where time coordination is especially critical. This includes military operations, the US National Oceanic and Atmospheric Administration and the International Space Station. Within the United States, some have cited effective international use of UTC in certain industries as evidence that a permanent national time zone would work within the United States, a change the Secretary of Transportation would have the authority to make.

=== Advantages ===
- The same time is used globally, which removes the requirement of calculations between different zones.
- Possible health benefits as people who live on the eastern side of a time zone are out of sync with the circadian rhythms.

=== Disadvantages ===
- The date will change during daylight hours in parts of the Americas and Asia–Pacific.
- Requires changes in linguistic terminology related to time.
- Conceptually, time zones would still be in effect as different regions would still carry out activities such as business hours, lunch, school, etc. at different UTC times, essentially trading one system for a tantamount one.

For example, at 08:00 (8 AM), with UTC±0 as a worldwide standard, the sky in the Eastern United States would look how it normally does at 03:00 (3 AM), and in China would look how it does at 16:00 (4 PM). However, in the United Kingdom, the sky would look the same as it normally does at 08:00 (8 AM).

== See also ==
- Daylight saving time#Opposition to clock changes
- Eastern Standard Tribe
- Calendar reform
- Time in China
