= Makers (novel) =

2009 novel by Cory Doctorow

- Author: Cory Doctorow
- Language: English
- Genre: Fiction
- Publisher: HarperVoyager (UK); Tor Books (US)
- Publication place: United States
- Media type: Book
- ISBN: 978-0-7653-1279-2

Makers is a novel by Canadian-British science fiction author Cory Doctorow released in October 2009. It was nominated for the Prometheus Award.

The book focuses on a near-future imagining of members of the maker culture, a group Doctorow characterizes as being composed of "people who hack hardware, business-models, and living arrangements to discover ways of staying alive and happy even when the economy is falling down the toilet".

The novel is available free on the author's website, as a Creative Commons BY-NC-SA download. It is also published in traditional paper form by HarperVoyager. The UK hardcover is 416 pages long.

== Storyline ==
The book is based on a near-future story of Lester and Perry, two hardware hackers, and Suzanne, a journalist. Lester and Perry rebuild devices or 3D print things to sell. Kettlewell, the CEO of Kodak and Duracell, becomes aware of this and sends the journalist Suzanne on site to report on it in her blog. Lester and Perry's manufactured products are then manufactured and sold in large quantities. Afterwards, Lester and Perry open an interactive museum and are sued by Disney. Since they file a counterclaim, they settle out of court and Lester transfers to Disney to make new products for them.

The story contains numerous side-themes. For instance, extremely fat people like Lester can take a gene-therapy, if they can afford it, and become slim no matter how much they eat. The downside: they must now consume 10,000 or so kilocalories per day just to survive. They call themselves "fatkins" and get special clubs and restaurants.
