= Pirate Cinema (novel) =

2012 novel by Cory Doctorow

- Author: Cory Doctorow
- Language: English
- Genre: Fiction
- Published: Tor Books
- Publication date: 2012
- Publication place: US
- Media type: Book
- Awards: 2013 Prometheus Award
- ISBN: 978-0-765-32908-0

Pirate Cinema is a 2012 novel by Canadian-British writer Cory Doctorow. The novel is licensed under the terms of Creative Commons BY-NC-ND license and is available free on the author's website. The US hardcover is 384 pages long.

The novel is set in a dystopian near-future Britain where the government is effectively controlled by media corporations. The main character, Trent McCauley, has had his internet access cut for reassembling downloaded films on his computer and, living rough on the streets of London, is trying to fight the introduction of a new draconian copyright law.

Pirate Cinema won the 2013 Prometheus Award.

This book was also featured as an e-book in the Humble eBook Bundle. The bundle raised more than $1.2 million, with customers paying an average amount of $14.29 for the bundle.
