= Prospero's Rooms =

Orchestral composition by Christopher Rouse

Prospero's Rooms is a single-movement orchestral composition by the American composer Christopher Rouse. The work was commissioned by the New York Philharmonic, for which Rouse was composer-in-residence, and was completed in 2011. The title comes from the Edgar Allan Poe short story "The Masque of the Red Death," in which the main character Prince Prospero and his fellow aristocrats try to escape the ravages of a plague known as the "Red Death" by locking themselves away from the outside world during a masquerade ball.

Prospero's Rooms had its world premiere on April 17, 2013, at Avery Fisher Hall in New York City, with conductor Alan Gilbert leading the New York Philharmonic; the UK premiere took place at the Barbican Centre in London on April 24, 2015, with Michal Nesterowicz conducting the BBC Symphony Orchestra, with the performance being broadcast live on BBC Radio 3's Radio 3 Live in Concert program.

== Composition ==
On the inception and composition of the work, Rouse wrote in the score program notes:

In the days when I would have still contemplated composing an opera, my preferred source was Edgar Allan Poe's 'Masque of the Red Death.' A marvelous story full of both symbolism and terror, it is only five pages long and would thus require 'padding' instead of the usual brutal cutting of the story. I had contemplated some sort of melding of the Poe story with Leonid Andreyev's symbolist play 'The Black Maskers.' However, I shall not be composing an opera, and so I decided to redirect my ideas into what might be considered an overture to an unwritten opera.

=== Instrumentation ===
Prospero's Rooms is scored for an orchestra comprising two flutes, piccolo, two oboes, cor anglais, two clarinets, bass clarinet, two bassoons, contrabassoon, four horns, three trumpets, three trombones, tuba, timpani, three percussionists, harp, and strings.

== Reception ==
Reviewing the world premiere, Corinna da Fonseca-Wollheim of The New York Times praised Prospero's Rooms, saying, "In Mr. Rouse’s atmospheric work, the story is told with dreamlike speed — 10 minutes from the cadaverous contrabassoon line that opens over quiet string rumblings to the final terrifying crash. Poe’s ball takes place in a sequence of monochrome rooms and the music had a strong sense of motion and spaces being entered and left behind, as well as colors that sometimes seemed eerily disembodied from the instruments that produced them." George Hall of The Guardian called the work "unmemorable," but nevertheless complimented it as "a lively, if frenetic, piece of orchestral writing."

== See also ==
- The Masque of the Red Death in popular culture
- Edgar Allan Poe and music
