= The Lost Cause (novel) =

2023 social fiction novel

- Author: Cory Doctorow
- Genre: Social science fiction
- Publication date: November 14, 2023
- ISBN: 1-035-90224-9
- Website: https://craphound.com/category/lostcause/

The Lost Cause is a 2023 social science fiction novel by Canadian writer Cory Doctorow, published by Tor Books.

The novel is set in near-future California, where rising seas, fires, and floods due to climate change have made millions homeless, and has caused a political sea-change in North America and Europe, shifting towards Green New Deal-style eco-socialism. Its story follows Brooks Palazzo and his friends, in conflict with his grandfather.

== Plot ==
Set in a mid-21st-century Burbank, California, the novel follows 19-year-old Brooks Palazzo, a worker for the federal "Job Guarantee" program. The world is defined by "solarpunk" climate mitigation efforts like the "Miracle of Calgary"—a historical event where government spending and mass labor successfully rebuilt a destroyed city. However, these efforts are opposed by the "Magas", an older generation of climate deniers, and the "Plutes", billionaires living on sovereign offshore Flotillas.

The story begins when Brooks catches a family friend sabotaging the high school's solar panels. Following a fallout with his grandfather over the incident, Brooks is briefly kicked out, only to return and find his grandfather has died. While settling the estate, Brooks discovers a secret cellar containing illegal AR-15 rifles, gold Krugerrands, and a copy of The Walkaway—a "Plute"-funded propaganda novel that radicalizes the Magas by blending ideologies from Atlas Shrugged and The Turner Diaries.

Tension escalates when a caravan of climate refugees ("refus") arrives in Burbank. While Brooks and his "Blue Helmet" peers attempt to build high-density housing for them, the Plutes weaponize the local Historical Society to block construction through "lawfare". They also deploy "hydro-reactive" crosses throughout the town—monuments that ignite when sprayed with water.

After a failed diplomatic mission to the Flotilla—where Brooks is ejected for questioning the billionaires' economic theories—the conflict turns violent. During a catastrophic brush fire, the Magas launch a "January 6th-style" insurrection, wearing gas masks and ghillie suits to seize the refugee sanctuary. Brooks briefly recovers his grandfather's discarded rifles to fight back, but finds the refugees have already liberated themselves through collective action. The police arrest the insurgents, who are trapped by the very fires they ignored.

In the aftermath, Brooks demolishes his inherited home to create a permanent sanctuary for the refugees. The novel ends on the beach, where a Plute representative arrives on a yacht to offer Brooks a deal, mistakenly believing the uprising was a success. Brooks rejects the offer, committing himself to the slow, communal work of the Green New Deal.

== Reception ==
Critical reception for The Lost Cause was mixed to positive, with GeekDad stating that "the 'everyone will pitch in for the good of mankind' mentality found in The Lost Cause, felt pollyannaish" and SFBook stating that "[The] Lost Cause is not the most fun book that you will read, but it is thought provoking."
