= Post-scarcity =

Situation in which most goods are available to everyone at little or no cost

Post-scarcity is a theoretical economic situation in which most goods can be produced in great abundance with minimal human labor, so that they become available to all very cheaply or even freely.

Post-scarcity does not mean that scarcity has been eliminated for all goods and services. Instead it means that all people can easily have their basic survival needs met along with some significant proportion of their desires for goods and services. Writers on the topic often emphasize that some commodities will remain scarce in a post-scarcity society.

== Models ==
=== Speculative technology ===
Futurists who speak of "post-scarcity" suggest economies based on advances in automated manufacturing technologies, often including the idea of self-replicating machines, and the adoption of division of labour, which in theory could produce nearly all goods in abundance, given adequate raw materials and energy.

More speculative forms of nanotechnology such as molecular assemblers or nanofactories, which do not currently exist, raise the possibility of devices that can automatically manufacture any specified goods given the correct instructions and the necessary raw materials and energy, and many nanotechnology enthusiasts have suggested it will usher in a post-scarcity world.

In the more near-term future, the increasing automation of physical labor using robots is often discussed as means of creating a post-scarcity economy.

Increasingly versatile forms of rapid prototyping machines, and a hypothetical self-replicating version of such a machine known as a RepRap, have also been predicted to help create the abundance of goods needed for a post-scarcity economy. Advocates of self-replicating machines such as Adrian Bowyer, the creator of the RepRap project, argue that once a self-replicating machine is designed, then since anyone who owns one can make more copies to sell (and would also be free to ask for a lower price than other sellers), market competition will naturally drive the cost of such machines down to the bare minimum needed to make a profit, in this case just above the cost of the physical materials and energy that must be fed into the machine as input, and the same should go for any other goods that the machine can build.

Even with fully automated production, limitations on the number of goods produced would arise from the availability of raw materials and energy, as well as ecological damage associated with manufacturing technologies. Advocates of technological abundance often argue for more extensive use of renewable energy and greater recycling in order to prevent future drops in availability of energy and raw materials, and reduce ecological damage. Solar energy in particular is often emphasized, as the cost of solar panels continues to drop (and could drop far more with automated production by self-replicating machines), and advocates point out the total solar power striking the Earth's surface annually exceeds our civilization's current annual power usage by a factor of thousands.

Advocates also argue that the energy and raw materials available could be greatly expanded by looking to resources beyond the Earth. For example, asteroid mining is sometimes discussed as a way of greatly reducing scarcity for many useful metals such as nickel. While early asteroid mining might involve crewed missions, advocates hope that eventually humanity could have automated mining done by self-replicating machines. If this were done, then the only capital expenditure would be a single self-replicating unit (whether robotic or nanotechnological). The unit could then replicate at no further cost, limited only by the available raw materials needed to build more.

=== Social ===
A World Future Society report looked at how historically capitalism takes advantage of scarcity. Increased resource scarcity leads to increase and fluctuation of prices, which drives advances in technology for more efficient use of resources such that costs will be considerably reduced, almost to zero. They thus claim that following an increase in scarcity from now, the world will enter a post-scarcity age between 2050 and 2075.

Murray Bookchin's 1971 essay collection Post-Scarcity Anarchism outlines an economy based on social ecology, libertarian municipalism, and an abundance of fundamental resources, arguing that post-industrial societies have the potential to be developed into post-scarcity societies. Such development would enable "the fulfillment of the social and cultural potentialities latent in a technology of abundance".

Bookchin claims that the expanded production made possible by the technological advances of the twentieth century were in the pursuit of market profit and at the expense of the needs of humans and of ecological sustainability. The accumulation of capital can no longer be considered a prerequisite for liberation, and the notion that obstructions such as the state, social hierarchy, and vanguard political parties are necessary in the struggle for freedom of the working classes can be dispelled as a myth.

=== Marxism ===
Karl Marx, in a section of his Grundrisse that came to be known as the "Fragment on Machines", argued that the transition to a post-capitalist society combined with advances in automation would allow for significant reductions in labor needed to produce necessary goods, eventually reaching a point where all people would have significant amounts of leisure time to pursue science, the arts, and creative activities; a state some commentators later labeled as "post-scarcity". Marx argued that capitalism—the dynamic of economic growth based on capital accumulation—depends on exploiting the surplus labor of workers, but a post-capitalist society would allow for:

The free development of individualities, and hence not the reduction of necessary labour time so as to posit surplus labour, but rather the general reduction of the necessary labour of society to a minimum, which then corresponds to the artistic, scientific etc. development of the individuals in the time set free, and with the means created, for all of them.

Marx's concept of a post-capitalist communist society involves the free distribution of goods made possible by the abundance provided by automation. The fully developed communist economic system is postulated to develop from a preceding socialist system. Marx held the view that socialism—a system based on social ownership of the means of production—would enable progress toward the development of fully developed communism by further advancing productive technology. Under socialism, with its increasing levels of automation, an increasing proportion of goods would be distributed freely.

Marx did not believe in the elimination of most physical labor through technological advancements alone in a capitalist society, because he believed capitalism contained within it certain tendencies which countered increasing automation and prevented it from developing beyond a limited point, so that manual industrial labor could not be eliminated until the overthrow of capitalism. Some commentators on Marx have argued that at the time he wrote the Grundrisse, he thought that the collapse of capitalism due to advancing automation was inevitable despite these counter-tendencies, but that by the time of his major work Capital: Critique of Political Economy he had abandoned this view, and came to believe that capitalism could continually renew itself unless overthrown.

=== Surplus economics ===
Surplus economics is a heterodox economic theory that centres on the implications of economic surplus—production beyond essential needs—and its role in shaping modern exchange economies. Contrary to the orthodox economic focus on scarcity, surplus economics argues that the real economic challenge is managing the consequences of abundance, including inequality, consumption, and motivation. The theory proposes that modern capitalism functions not to allocate scarce resources efficiently, but to absorb and destroy surplus through patterns of production and exchange.

== Fiction ==
=== Literature ===
- The 1954 novella The Midas Plague by Frederik Pohl describes a world of cheap energy, in which robots are overproducing the commodities enjoyed by humankind. The lower-class "poor" must spend their lives in frantic consumption, trying to keep up with the robots' extravagant production, while the upper-class "rich" can live lives of simplicity.
- A for Anything by Damon Knight, a 1961 novel. In the near future, a scientist invents the "Gismo", a device that can duplicate anything, even another Gismo, and sends pairs of them to various people around the world. Civilization almost immediately collapses. Since all material objects have become essentially free, the only commodity of value is human labor, and the author suggests that a slave economy (of subhumans copied by Gismos controlled by feudal lords) would be the inevitable result.
- The Mars trilogy by Kim Stanley Robinson charts the terraforming of Mars as a human colony and the establishment of a post-scarcity society.
- Beyond This Horizon, a 1942 Robert Heinlein novella.
- The Culture novels by Iain M. Banks are centered on a post-scarcity economy where technology is advanced to such a degree that all production is automated, and there is no use for money or property (aside from personal possessions with sentimental value). People in the Culture are free to pursue their own interests in an open and socially-permissive society.
  - The society depicted in the Culture novels has been described by some commentators as "communist-bloc" or "anarcho-communist". Banks' close friend and fellow science fiction writer Ken MacLeod has said that The Culture can be seen as a realization of Marx's communism, but adds that "however friendly he was to the radical left, Iain had little interest in relating the long-range possibility of utopia to radical politics in the here and now. As he saw it, what mattered was to keep the utopian possibility open by continuing technological progress, especially space development, and in the meantime to support whatever policies and politics in the real world were rational and humane."
- The Rapture of the Nerds by Cory Doctorow and Charles Stross takes place in a post-scarcity society and involves "disruptive" technology. The title is a derogatory term for the technological singularity coined by SF author Ken MacLeod.
- Con Blomberg's 1959 short story Sales Talk depicts a post-scarcity society in which society incentivizes consumption to reduce the burden of overproduction. To further reduce production, virtual reality is used to fulfill peoples' needs to create.
- Cory Doctorow's novel Walkaway presents a modern take on the idea of post-scarcity. With the advent of 3D printing – and especially the ability to use these to fabricate even better fabricators – and with machines that can search for and reprocess waste or discarded materials, the protagonists no longer have need of regular society for the basic essentials of life, such as food, clothing and shelter.

=== Television and film ===
- The 24th-century human society depicted in the television series Star Trek: The Original Series, Star Trek: The Next Generation, Star Trek: Deep Space Nine, and Star Trek: Voyager is a post-scarcity society brought about by the invention of the "replicator", a machine that converts energy to matter instantaneously. In the film Star Trek: First Contact, Captain Jean-Luc Picard asserts: "The acquisition of wealth is no longer the driving force of our lives. We work to better ourselves and the rest of humanity." In this galaxy (at least the United Federation of Planets), money had been rendered obsolete on Earth by the 22nd century (although it still existed with reference to other species in the Star Trek universe, most notably the Ferengi).

== See also ==
- Affluent society
- Bright green environmentalism
- Commons-based peer production
- Communist society
- Economic problem
- Futures studies
- Jacque Fresco
- Imagination Age
- Information society
- Knowledge economy
- New Frontier
- Post-capitalism
- Post-work society
- Progress
- Radical Abundance, a 2013 book on the potential of nanotechnology
- Scarcity
- Scientism
- Surplus economics
- Technocentrism
- Technocracy movement
- Technological utopianism
- Techno-progressivism
- Universal basic income
