= The Internet Con =

2023 book by Cory Doctorow

The Internet Con: How to Seize the Means of Computation
- Author: Cory Doctorow
- Genre: technology journalism
- Publisher: Verso
- Publication date: 2023
- Pages: 192
- ISBN: 978-1-80429-216-7

The Internet Con: How to Seize the Means of Computation is a 2023 non-fiction book by journalist and internet activist Cory Doctorow.

The central thesis of The Internet Con is that the Big Tech (several largest technological companies) have been able to become near-monopolists and gather an unsustainable amount of power due to the criminalisation of interoperability. These laws make reverse-engineering a crime and lock their customers within heavily surveiled platforms. Doctorow also provides a comparison between the tech and other industries, attempting to undermine the common argument about "tech geniuses" such as Mark Zuckerberg, who ended up monopolising the internet because of their alleged entrepreneurial and technical prowess.

The book is written for both tech-savvy and non-technical audiences and proposes both market-based and policy-based solutions to the lack of interoperability.

== Summary ==
The Internet Con starts from an outlook of the legal and economic reality in the USA and Europe in 1970—1980, when the antitrust laws were weakened to allow monopolisation of many industries; Doctorow blames Robert Bork and the Chicago school of economics for this change. He provides examples of outsized influence of Big Tech companies on the lives of ordinary people, such as the ability of Google to kill a local business by excluding it from the search results. However, the founding principles of computers include universality, so the current situation is exceptional. Chapters 2—4 include the legal history of many technologies and services in the United States:

- Gopher, a predecessor of search engines that connected the internet because of interoperability.
- The 20-year-long USA court case against IBM that, according to Doctorow, resulted in the adoption of a third-party operating system for the IBM PC: MS-DOS.
- A similar case was started in 2020 by FTC against Facebook's parent company, and revealed a concerted effort by executives and engineers to reduce interoperability.
- Another case against the peer-to-peer music sharing service Napster that resulted in its closing down.
- The case against recording TV programmes using home VCRs was ruled in favour of considering it fair use.
- The case against Grokster held the file sharing service liable for copyright infringement.
- The 1998 Digital Millennium Copyright Act allowed the companies to provide services that potentially can be used for copyright infringement if the company satisfies takedown notices from the owner of intellectual property. Doctorow shows that this system is prone to malicious litigation from people who are not IP owners, but who want to delete some undesirable content from the internet.
- Litigation against cover versions of songs broadcast by radio resulted in the introduction of the right to make a cover without asking the composer in the Copyright Act of 1909
- The standardisation of the automobile auxiliary power outlet occurred without resistance from car making companies.
- The so-called UN internet treaties (Note: WIPO Copyright Treaty and WIPO Performances and Phonograms Treaty) made it illegal to circumvent digital locks, which enabled companies to prohibit repair and tinkering as well as artificially shorten the lifespan of their goods.

Chapter 5 discusses standardising organisations and attempts by Big Tech to affect their work. Chapter 6 talks about reverse engineering as competitive interoperability, such as finding and triggering the kill switch of the WannaCry ransomware attack by Marcus Hutchins.

Chapters 7 and 8 advocate for federation, showcase the problems that result from Apple Inc.'s monopoly within the iOS / iPhone ecosystem and detail the attempts to regulate the tech industry by the EU Digital Markets Act and the US ACCESS Act of 2021.

Chapters 9—15 list the arguments about privacy, cyberharassment, algorithmic radicalization, extremist materials, and nonconsensual and child pornography etc; Doctorow concludes that in the world of regulated tech with compulsory interoperability these problems can be dealt with using similar or better tools than in the world dominated by Big Tech.

== Reviews ==
The Internet Con received favourable reviews, with praise to its accessible language and concrete actionable proposals backed by factual narratives. Lauren Goode from the Wired liked the humorous tone of the book and commented that she felt "galvanised" after reading it. The USAToday book reviews shared the same sentiment, calling it "the disassembly manual we need to take back our internet." Andrew Wright from People's World specifically complimented the book's eagerness to engage with the "boring" parts of the industry and policy in his review, because it shields the Big Tech from public scrutiny. Kurt Schiller wrote a positive review, but was sceptical of the idea that restoring interoperability would be enough to revert the trend to monopolisation, calling for a more thorough overhaul of the tech market. The Publishers Weekly review praised the compelling arguments of The Internet Con, but critiqued lack of depth in some aspects. Tim Ribaric and Kurt Schiller also both noted that the second part of the book (chapters 9—15) is less developed than the first, with the exception for the section on blockchain. Ribaric complimented that the text is not hiding the author's clear stance on the questions he discussed.

== Awards ==
The Neil Postman Award for Career Achievement in Public Intellectual Activity (2024)

== Bibliography ==
- Ribaric, Tim (29 February 2024). "Review of Doctorow's The Internet Con: How to Seize the Means of Computation". Surveillance & Society. 22 (1): 68–69. doi:10.24908/ss.v22i1.16847. ISSN 1477-7487.
- Bajak, Frank (2023-09-13). "Cory Doctorow pens a manual for destroying Big Tech". Associated Press. Archived from the original on 2024-11-13.
- "USA Today Booklist". USA Today. 2023-10-04. Archived from the original on 2026-05-17.
- "2024 MEA Awards". Media Ecology Association. 2024. Archived from the original on 2025-04-29.
- Schiller, Kurt (2023-11-15). "Interoperability Won't Save Us. But It Might Help". Blood Knife. Archived from the original on 2025-04-06.
- Wright, Andrew (2024-01-12). "Cory Doctorow's The Internet Con: The long con of boring politics". People's World. Archived from the original on 2025-06-04.
- "The Internet Con: How to Seize the Means of Computation". Publishers Weekly. 2023-07-07. Archived from the original on 2025-08-03.
- Lichfield, Gideon; Goode, Lauren (2023-09-13). "How to Take Back the Internet". Wired. Archived from the original on 2025-05-10.
- Richardson, Tony (2023-11-01). "The Internet Con: How To Seize The Means Of Computation". Anti*Capitalist Resistance. Archived from the original on 2025-06-15.
- "The New York Times Book Review: Newly Published, From a 450-year-old Robot to Annie Ernaux". The New York Times. 2023-09-07. Archived from the original on 2024-07-09.
