= Bakka-Phoenix =

Bookstore in Toronto, Canada

Coordinates: 43°39′46.9″N 79°24′10.2″W

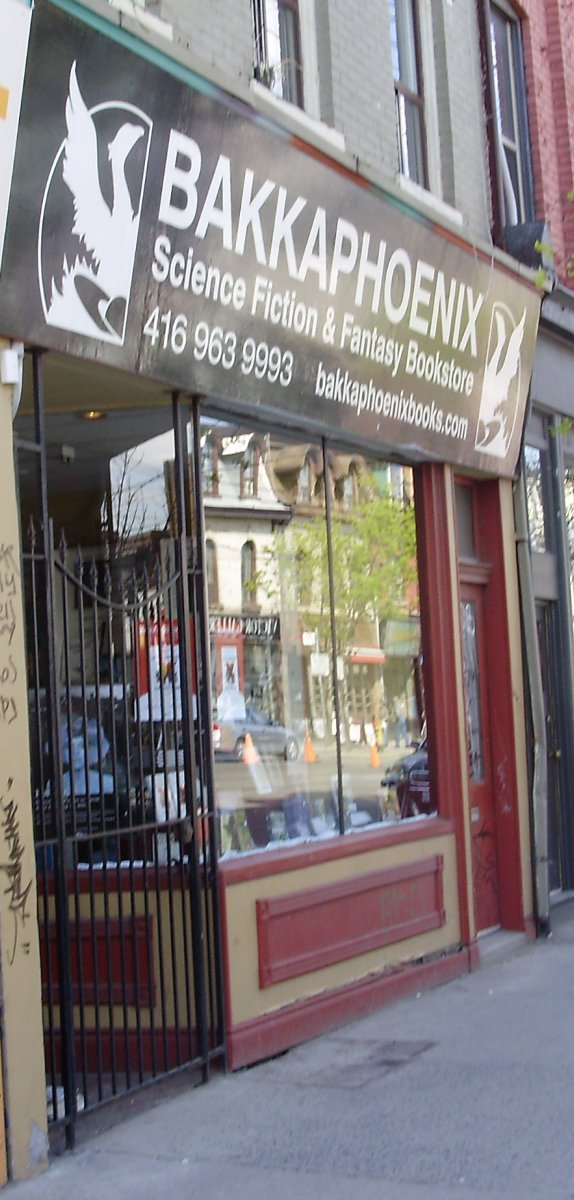
The previous storefront of Bakka-Phoenix Science Fiction & Fantasy Bookstore, at its former 697 Queen Street West location

Bakka-Phoenix Science Fiction & Fantasy Bookstore is an independent bookstore in Toronto, Ontario, which specializes in science fiction and fantasy literature.

== History ==
Bakka was started on Toronto's Queen Street West in May 1972 as a combined science-fiction and comic book store called Bakka, a name taken by founding owner Charles McKee from a Fremen legend in Frank Herbert's novel Dune. The comic book business split off early on, becoming The Silver Snail, originally located on the opposite side of Queen Street West.

Bakka published Bakka Magazine from 1975-77.

The store moved in March 1998 to 598 Yonge Street in Toronto, the same building as the Glad Day Bookshop, and relocated in March 2005 to 697 Queen Street West in Toronto.

In November 2010, the store moved again, this time to larger quarters at 84 Harbord Street, adjacent to the main campus of the University of Toronto, in the Harbord Village neighbourhood. The new building has a ground floor devoted to new books; a downstairs devoted to media tie-ins, related nonfiction, and used books; and an upstairs function room available for book club meetings and similar events. Although the previous locations were rental sites, the store owns the Harbord Street building.

Bakka originally had a substantial stock of used books, but when the store moved to its 1998 location, the reduced space meant that emphasis shifted almost entirely to new books; with the November 2010 move, it went back to having a significant used-book section. Unlike many other science-fiction specialty stores, Bakka has remained almost exclusively a bookstore; it does not sell toys, games, comics, memorabilia, or collectibles.

At the original location, the store styled its name as "Bakka: A Science Fiction Book Shoppe". The signage out front in later years there was a space mural by Toronto artist Kevin Davies. At the 697 Queen Street location, the store styled itself as "BakkaPhoenix Science Fiction & Fantasy Bookstore", with signage graphics by John Rose, owner of the store at the time. The signage at the 84 Harbord location, also with graphics by Rose, adds a hyphen, styling it as "Bakka-Phoenix Books: Science Fiction & Fantasy Bookstore".

Its third owner, Ben Freiman, bought the store in 2003 from Rose; he appended "Phoenix" to the store's name to mark the new ownership, although the clientele still mostly refer to the store as just "Bakka". Freiman made no changes to the staff; Christine Szego was manager until 2018. After retiring, she was replaced with Scott Dagostino, who left in 2020. The current manager is Becca Lovatt.

Several noted Canadian science fiction and fantasy authors, including Robert J. Sawyer, Tanya Huff, Cory Doctorow, and Nalo Hopkinson, have been employed by the store. In honor of the store's 30th anniversary, The Bakka Anthology, containing new stories by all of these writers with an introduction by Spider Robinson, was published in 2002. The anthology was edited by Kristen Pederson Chew, and was the final volume released under the Bakka Books imprint, established by then-owner John Rose.
