= The Rapture of the Nerds =

Novel by Doctorow and Charles Stross

- First US edition cover
- Author: Cory Doctorow & Charles Stross
- Language: English
- Genre: Science fiction
- Published: Tor Books
- Publication date: 2012
- Publication place: US
- Media type: Print (hardcover), ebook
- Pages: 349
- ISBN: 978-0-765-32910-3

The Rapture of the Nerds is a 2012 novel by Cory Doctorow and Charles Stross. It was released on 4 September 2012 through Tor Books and as an ebook, DRM free, under the CC BY-NC-ND. The book can also be downloaded for free.

== Synopsis ==
The novel is a fixup of two novellas, "Jury Duty" and "Appeals Court", along with a new third section, "Parole Board". The book, set in the late 21st century, takes a generally comic look at the technological singularity through the eyes of Huw, a technophobic member of a "Tech Jury Service" tasked with determining the value of various technological innovations and deciding whether to release them.

== Reception ==
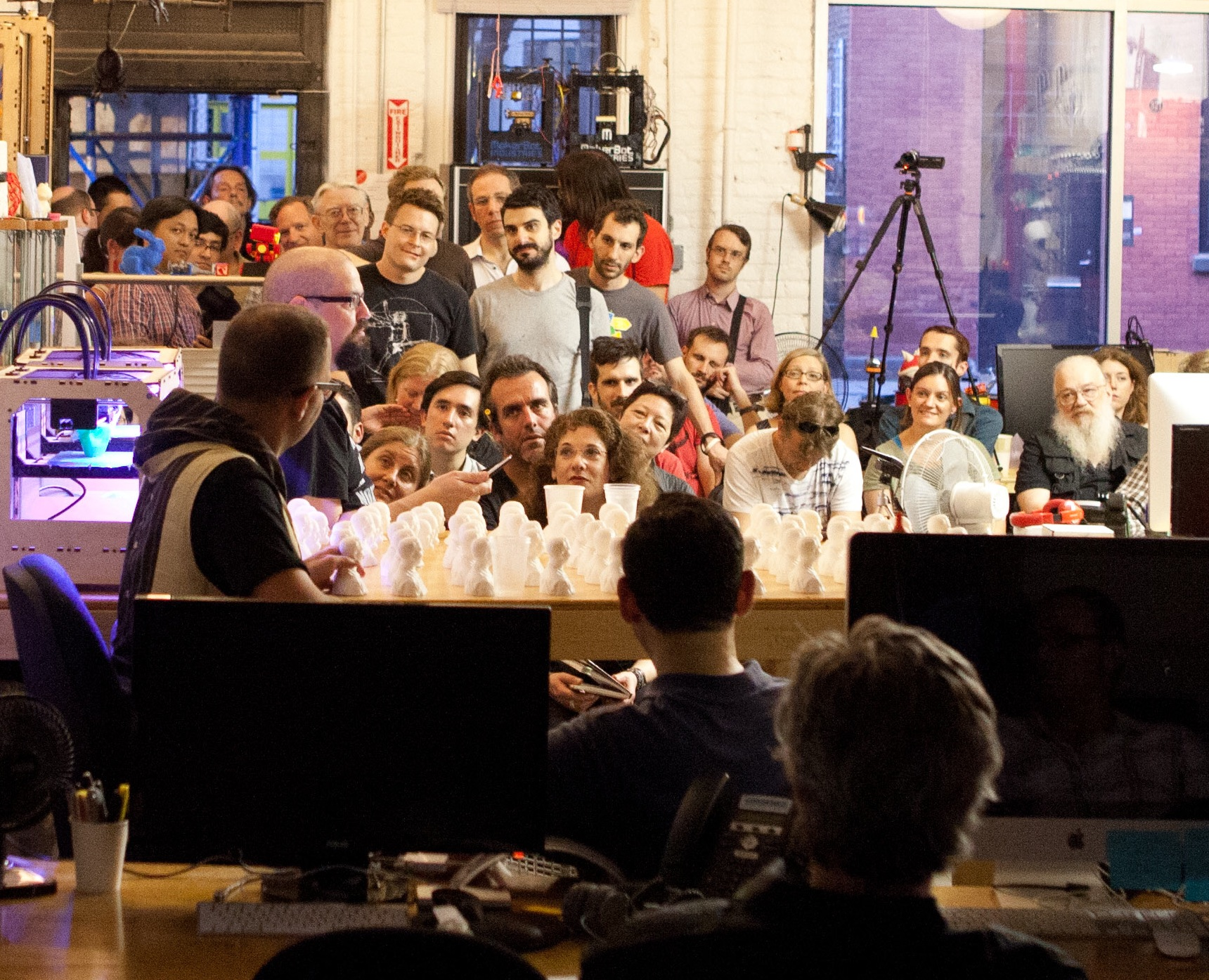
Stross and Doctorow read from the book at Makerbot's former Brooklyn factory on Dean street in 2012.

Critical reception for The Rapture of the Nerds was mixed to positive, with the book gaining a positive review from Quill & Quire. NPR and Kirkus Reviews both gave mixed reviews, with NPR stating that the conclusion, when it "finally comes, feels like a simulation of a satisfying conclusion rather than the real thing".
