= A Place So Foreign and Eight More =

2003 collection of short stories by Cory Doctorow

- First edition
- Author: Cory Doctorow
- Cover artist: Jerry Engelbach
- Genre: Science fiction, Short stories
- Publisher: Four Walls Eight Windows
- Publication date: 8 September 2003
- Pages: 352
- ISBN: 1568582862

A Place So Foreign and Eight More is a collection of short stories by Canadian-British writer Cory Doctorow. Six of these stories were released electronically under a Creative Commons license. A paperback edition was issued in New York by publisher Four Walls Eight Windows in 2003 with ISBN 1-56858-286-2. The collection features an introduction by Bruce Sterling, and includes "0wnz0red", which was nominated for the 2003 Nebula Award for Best Novelette.

== Contents ==
- "The Kingdom of Magic Junk, by Bruce Sterling" (Introduction)
- "Craphound"
- "A Place So Foreign"
- "All Day Sucker"
- "To Market, To Market: The Rebranding of Billy Bailey"
- "Return to Pleasure Island"
- "Shadow of the Mothaship"
- "Home Again, Home Again"
- "The Super Man and the Bugout"
- Doctorow, Cory (August 28, 2002). "0wnz0red". Salon. Archived from the original on December 31, 2011.
