= I, Robot (Cory Doctorow) =

2005 short story by Cory Doctorow

I, Robot is a science-fiction short story by Cory Doctorow published April 15, 2005.

According to Doctorow's website:

In spring 2004, in the wake of Ray Bradbury pitching a tantrum over Michael Moore appropriating the title of Fahrenheit 451 to make Fahrenheit 9/11, I conceived of a plan to write a series of stories with the same titles as famous sf shorts, which would pick apart the totalitarian assumptions underpinning some of sf's classic narratives.

The story is influenced by Isaac Asimov's Robot series and by George Orwell's Nineteen Eighty-Four.

The story is set in the type of police state needed to ensure that only one company is allowed to make robots, and only one type of robot is allowed.

The story is set in a future Toronto, part of the United North American Trading Sphere, and follows single father detective Arturo Icaza de Arana-Goldberg while he tries to track down his missing teenage daughter. The detective is a bit of an outcast because his wife defected to Eurasia, a rival Superpower.

== Reception ==
The story won the Locus Award for Best Novelette and was a finalist for the 2006 Hugo Award for Best Novelette.
