= Borderlands Books =

Independent bookstore based in San Francisco

Coordinates: 37.7590223°N 122.4215054°W

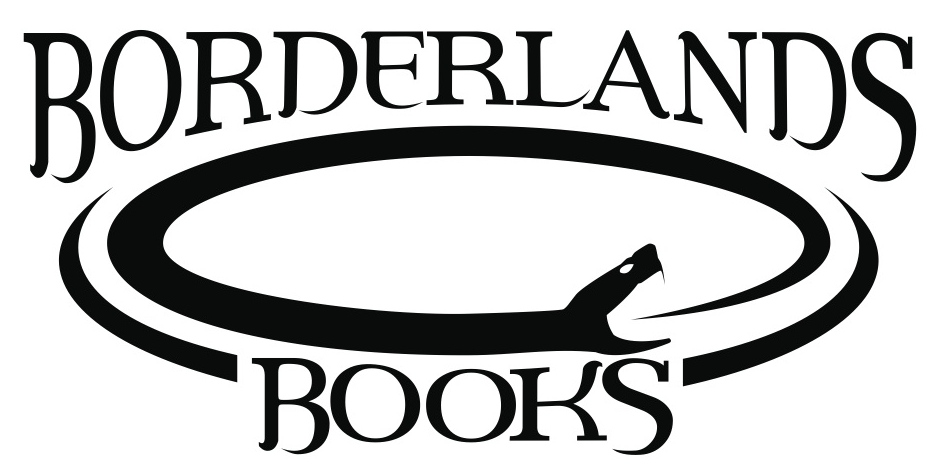

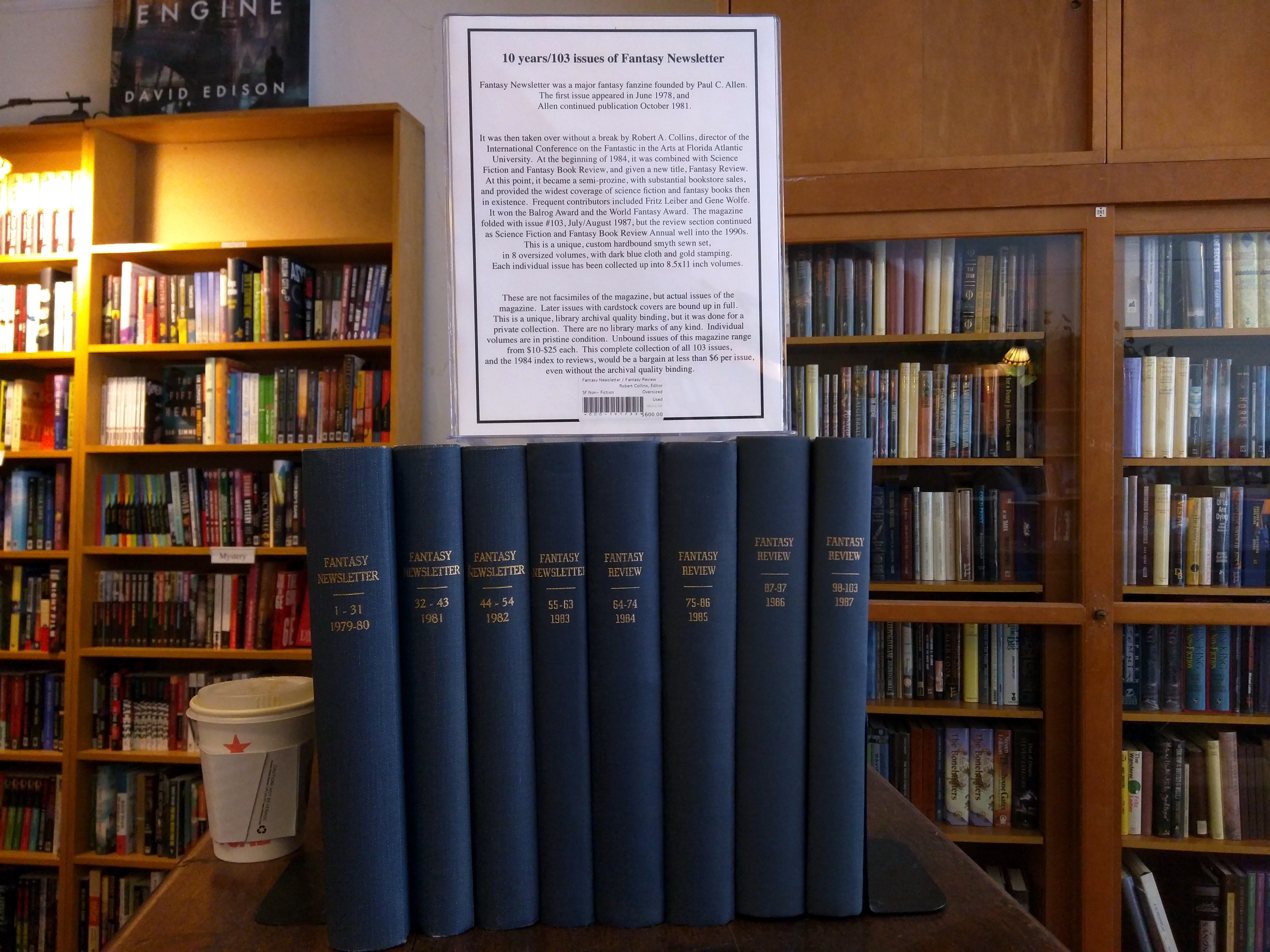
- Company type: Private
- Genre: Science fiction, fantasy and horror
- Founded: 1997
- Headquarters: San Francisco, California
- Owner: Alan Beatts
- Website: borderlands-books.com

Borderlands Books is a San Francisco independent bookstore specializing exclusively in science fiction, fantasy and horror.

== History ==
In 1997 Alan Beatts opened Borderlands in Hayes Valley as a used-only bookstore consisting of his personal collection and a selection of books from Know Knew Books in Palo Alto. In 2001 the store moved to 866 Valencia in the heart of the Mission District where it is currently located. Shortly after opening in the new location, Borderlands Books was awarded the "Best Sign Of De-Gentrification in the Mission" from the SF Bay Guardian.

On February 2, 2015, in an open letter posted on the store's website, the owners Alan Beatts and Jude Feldman, announced they would close the store on March 31, 2015, explaining they could not afford to pay San Francisco's recently enacted $15 minimum wage (a minimum wage that they support). The store later announced a plan to remain open by relying on 300 private sponsors at $100 apiece, and this goal was soon surpassed.

In November 2017, Borderlands Books purchased 1377 Haight St. in San Francisco from Recycled Records, which is slated to become its new permanent home.

== Events ==
The store makes appearances at horror and science-fiction conventions, and has hosted numerous events with authors and other genre visitors including Lou Anders, Chris Roberson, John Varley, Jacqueline Carey, John Picacio, Graham Joyce, Patricia McKillip, Paolo Bacigalupi David Drake, Randall Munroe, Steven Erikson, and Cory Doctorow.

Borderlands also hosted Tachyon Publications' anniversary party between 2001 and 2011 with the associated Emperor Norton Awards, given for “extraordinary invention and creativity unhindered by the constraints of paltry reason”. The first award was given to a single work of science fiction, fantasy, or horror, or to an author in these genres, and the second to any creation, creator, or service relating to those genres.

== Other information ==
In 2008, Borderlands' owner Alan Beatts and general manager Jude Feldman were jointly nominated for a World Fantasy Award under the World Fantasy Special Award: Professional category. In late 2009, Beatts opened Borderlands Cafe adjacent to the bookstore.

Borderlands had three Sphynx cat mascots in 2011, named Frost, Hudson, and Newt. The original Sphynx mascot, named Ripley, died in May 2010.

In June 2020, allegations that Beatts had committed physical and sexual assault, made violent threats, and engaged in an abusive "pattern of behavior" were publicized on social media and became the subject of genre and local reporting. As a result, a number of authors announced they would no longer support the bookstore or use it as a venue for events.
