= Alice Taylor (businesswoman) =

British entrepreneur

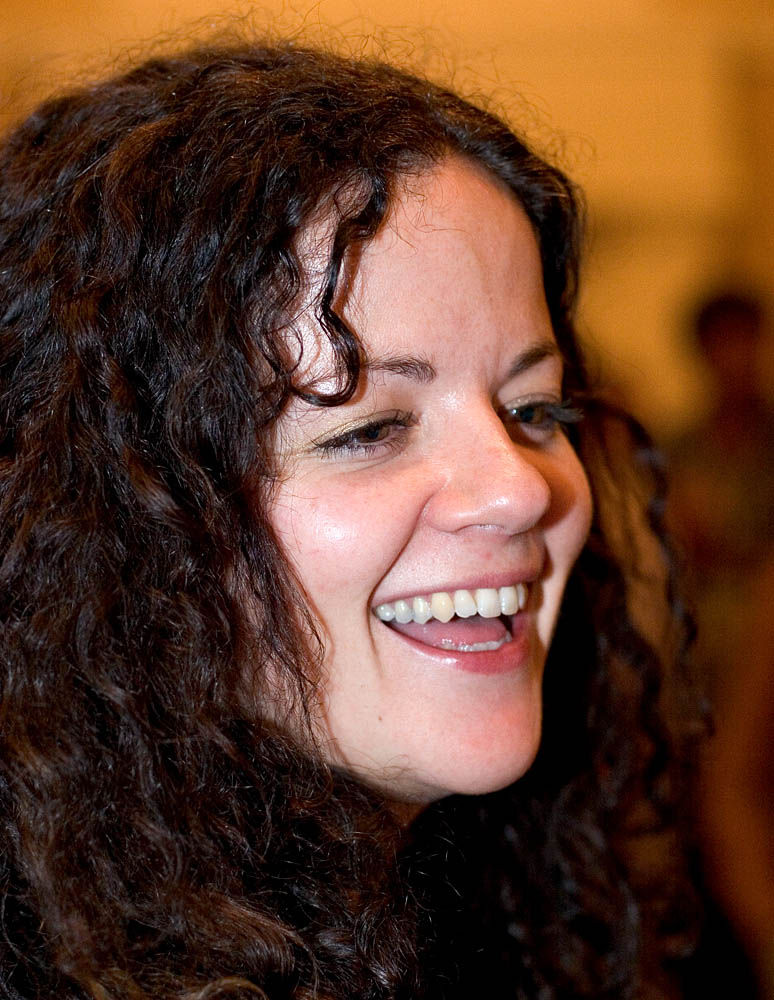
- Taylor in 2005
- Education: University of London
- Occupations: Head of AI Creative Lab, BBC Studios Productions
- Spouse: Cory Doctorow (m. 2008)

Alice Taylor is a British media and tech executive. In 2011 she founded MakieLab, an "'entertainment playspace for young people'" that allowed users to download and print 3D dolls and accessories. In 2017 MakieLab was sold to Disney, and Taylor took up a position there until 2025.

== Career ==
Taylor attended the University of London between 1990 and 1994.

In 1997, she played defense on the first UK Quake team, and a member of the UK's Demonic Core clan. In September 2002 she was an exhibit in the Game On exhibition at the Barbican, and featured in the accompanying book, Game On: The History and Culture of Video Games.

Taylor was Vice President of Digital Content for BBC Worldwide. She then served as commissioning editor for education on the British TV station Channel 4, where she developed a number of informal learning projects involving ARGs, casual gaming and other interactive entertainment formats. In September 2006 she was named one of the Game Industry's 100 Most Influential Women by Next Generation Magazine Online.

After Disney's acquisition of MakieLab, Taylor led StudioLab at The Walt Disney Studios. In November 2025 she left Disney and joined BBC Studios Productions as head of their new AI Creative Lab.

== Personal life ==
Taylor married Cory Doctorow in 2008. The same year their daughter, Poesy Emmeline Fibonacci Nautilus Taylor Doctorow, was born. The family has resided in Los Angeles since the early 2000s.
