= Down and Out in the Magic Kingdom =

2003 science fiction book by Cory Doctorow

- Author: Cory Doctorow
- Language: English
- Genre: Science fiction, Social Science Fiction, Cyberprep
- Publisher: Tor Books
- Publication date: 1 February 2003
- Publication place: Canada
- Media type: Print (hardcover & paperback) & ebook
- Pages: 208
- ISBN: 0-7653-0436-8 (hardcover) ISBN 0-7653-0953-X (paperback)
- OCLC: 50645482
- Dewey Decimal: 813/.6 21
- LC Class: PS3604.O27 D68 2003
- Followed by: Truncat

Down and Out in the Magic Kingdom is a 2003 science fiction book, the first novel by Canadian author and digital-rights activist Cory Doctorow. It depicts people competing over how new technology is being used at Walt Disney World, in a post-scarcity world with an economy based on reputation. Concurrent with its publication by Tor Books, Doctorow released the entire text of the novel under a Creative Commons noncommercial license on his website, allowing the whole text of the book to be freely read and distributed without needing any further permission from him or his publisher.

The novel was nominated for the Nebula Award for Best Novel in 2004.

== Plot summary ==
This future history book takes place in the 22nd century, mostly in Walt Disney World. Disney World is run by rival adhocracies, each dedicated to providing the best experience to the park's visitors and competing for the Whuffie the guests offer. In the post-scarcity world of the novel, Whuffie is a currency-like system that primarily measures the esteem of others, or in the case of extremely low Whuffie, their disdain.

The story is told in first person by Julius. His college friend Dan was rated to be one of the most popular people in the US (as measured by Whuffie). Julius and his girlfriend Lil are working with the committee (called an ad hoc) that oversees the Magic Kingdom's Liberty Square. Dan is at his nadir: he has lost all his Whuffie. He does not believe in rejuvenation and wishes to die, but not while he is so low. He moves in with Julius and Lil in order to rebuild his life. At the park, Julius is murdered and soon refreshed. By the time he awakens, Debra's ad hoc group has taken control of the Hall of Presidents and is planning to replace its old-fashioned animatronic robots with the synthetic memory imprinting of the experience of being the President for a moment.

Julius believes that this rival committee had him killed as a distraction so that they could seize the Hall in the interim. Fearing that they will next try to revamp his favorite ride, The Haunted Mansion, he resolves to take a stand against the virtualization of the park, endangering his relationship with both Lil and Dan. Eventually Lil leaves Julius for Dan. Julius experiences a mental breakdown when he sees his dreams dissolve. He bashes the attractions in the Hall of Presidents, in the process also damaging his own cranial interface, resulting in his inability to make backups of himself. As a result, his Whuffie level is decimated when he is caught, and Debra and her colleagues receive enough "sympathy Whuffie" to take over the Haunted Mansion, by invitation of the same fans that Julius had recruited to work in the Mansion.

Dan leaves Lil. Julius is ousted from the ad hoc. His Whuffie goes so low that others take his possessions with impunity and elevators ignore him. Then comes the revelation: a few days before Dan's planned suicide by lethal injection, Dan reveals that it was in fact he who had arranged to kill Julius, in collusion with Debra, in exchange for the Whuffie that her team could give him. Dan had asked one of his converts from his missionary days, a young girl, to handle the execution. Debra then had herself restored from a backup made before this plan, so that she would honestly believe that she was not involved. He makes this public; Debra is ousted, and Julius receives sympathy Whuffie. He develops a friendly affection for his young murderer. He never restores himself, because doing so would erase his memories of that entire year, his last with Dan, but lives with his damaged interface. The book is his attempt to manually document the happenings of the previous year so that, when this incarnation is eventually killed by age or accident, his restored backup will have a partial record of the transpiring events. Dan decides not to take a lethal injection, but to deadhead (putting oneself into a voluntary coma) till the heat death of the universe.

== Characters ==
Julius (also known as Jules)
the narrator of the book, is more than a century old. His childhood dream is living at Disney World (also known as "The Magic Kingdom").
Lil
Jules' girlfriend, age 23, with long red hair and freckles. She is 15 percent of Jules' age, but outwardly the same age. She was raised in Walt Disney World.
Dan
Jules' best male friend. He is a former missionary for the Bitchun utopia who has lost the will to live now that there are no technophobes left to convert.
Debra
one of the old guard of Disney World; a comrade of Lil's parents before they went deadhead. She spent a decade in Disneyland Beijing, coding sim-rides.
Tim
a programmer of synthetic memories.
Tom and Rita
Lil's parents who were "members of the original ad hoc that had seized power in Walt Disney World, wresting control from a gang of wealthy former shareholders who had been operating it as their private preserve".
Zed (also known as Zoya)
a transhuman who was married to Julius for 18 months, went crazy, and reverted to a backup from before she met Julius.

== Cultural cross references ==
- Chapter five includes a description of a "Snow Crash Spectacular parade" based on Neal Stephenson's book Snow Crash.
- The book contains references to the Beatles song "Rocky Raccoon". Julius' girlfriend leaves him for his friend Dan, just as Lil leaves Rocky Raccoon for a man named Dan in the song. At the beginning of the book, Jules and Lil sing some lyrics from the song.
- "Rangy Lil" is a character from the science fiction novel Time Enough for Love by Robert Heinlein. The character Dan in this book says: "Lil, you are one rangy cowgirl."
- Doctorow's short story "Truncat" is also set in the Bitchun Society, sometime after the events of Down and Out.
- Doctorow's short story "I, Row Boat", a play on words of Isaac Asimov's I, Robot, also appears to be set in the same universe (though more distantly future), with references to artificial uploading and downloading of intelligence, but no explicit mention of the Bitchun Society or Whuffie.
- The title is a reference to George Orwell's Down and Out in Paris and London.

== Licensing ==
On February 12, 2004, Doctorow re-licensed his book under a Creative Commons Attribution-Noncommercial-Share Alike (by-nc-sa) license. Under the new license, one can now make derivative works from the book without permission, provided the license and attribution is retained with each new work and the derivatives are not used commercially. Already, fans of the book have begun Russian and Spanish translations, an audio book version, and several amusing re-arrangements of the text. Doctorow has noted that he is pleased that people are building on his work, and that he hopes that further innovations will follow.

Despite these measures, in 2007 invalid DMCA takedown notices were sent by Science Fiction Writers of America (SFWA) with regard to this novel. Doctorow stated, "Down and Out in the Magic Kingdom was the first novel released under a Creative Commons license, and I've spent the past four years exhorting fans to copy my work and share it. Now I've started to hear from readers who've seen this notice and concluded that I am a hypocrite who uses SFWA to send out legal threats to people who heeded my exhortation."

== See also ==
- Adhocracy
- Liberty Square
- Post scarcity
- Postcyberpunk
- Reputation system
- Subvocal recognition
- Transhumanism
