= Radicalized (book) =

Collection of novellas

- First edition
- Author: Cory Doctorow
- Cover artist: Will Staehle
- Language: English
- Genre: Science fiction, Social Science Fiction, Anthology
- Publisher: TOR
- Publication date: 19 March 2019
- Media type: Print (hardcover and paperback), ebook
- Pages: 304
- ISBN: 9781250228581

Radicalized is a collection of novellas written by Canadian-British-American author Cory Doctorow. The book was initially released on 19 March 2019, by Tor Books. Radicalized explores such issues as digital rights management, police brutality, radicalization in internet communities, and doomsday preppers. Doctorow has stated that the collection was inspired by "dealing with the stress and anxiety of being alive in the Trump era," and that the stories are not meant to be predictive, but rather allegorical.

== Contents ==
- "Unauthorized Bread" – A refugee, Salima, confronts the software controlling her kitchen appliances after the companies who created those appliances suddenly cease operations.
- "Model Minority" – "American Eagle", a superhero resembling Superman, attempts to take on racial violence in the American policing system.
- "Radicalized" – A man becomes embroiled in a dark web network targeting insurance companies after his wife's cancer coverage was declined by their health insurer.
- "Masque of the Red Death" – A wealthy financier builds and manages a doomsday vault, designed to withstand societal collapse.

== Reception ==
John Scalzi, writing for the Los Angeles Times, described Radicalized as "a collection of four novellas that take on political and social themes relevant today — medical care, immigration, white male rage and technological monopolies, among others — [wrapped] in a layer of fiction, thin enough that most of these stories could be happening, if not today then tomorrow at the latest". Annette Lapointe of the New York Journal of Books critiqued that "The stories themselves are simple, and the characters thinly fleshed: no relief there. When we tear ourselves free, we find that we’ve found nothing substantial. Doctorow would have been better served to render his ideas as essays, so that he could give them the complexity they deserve, and release his barely realized characters from their political pantomime."

On 4 December 2024, the CEO of UnitedHealth Group was shot and killed in Manhattan, prompting online discussions about the similarity to "Radicalized."
