= Mysterious Galaxy =

Independent bookstore located in San Diego, California

Coordinates: 32.8194°N 117.1775°W

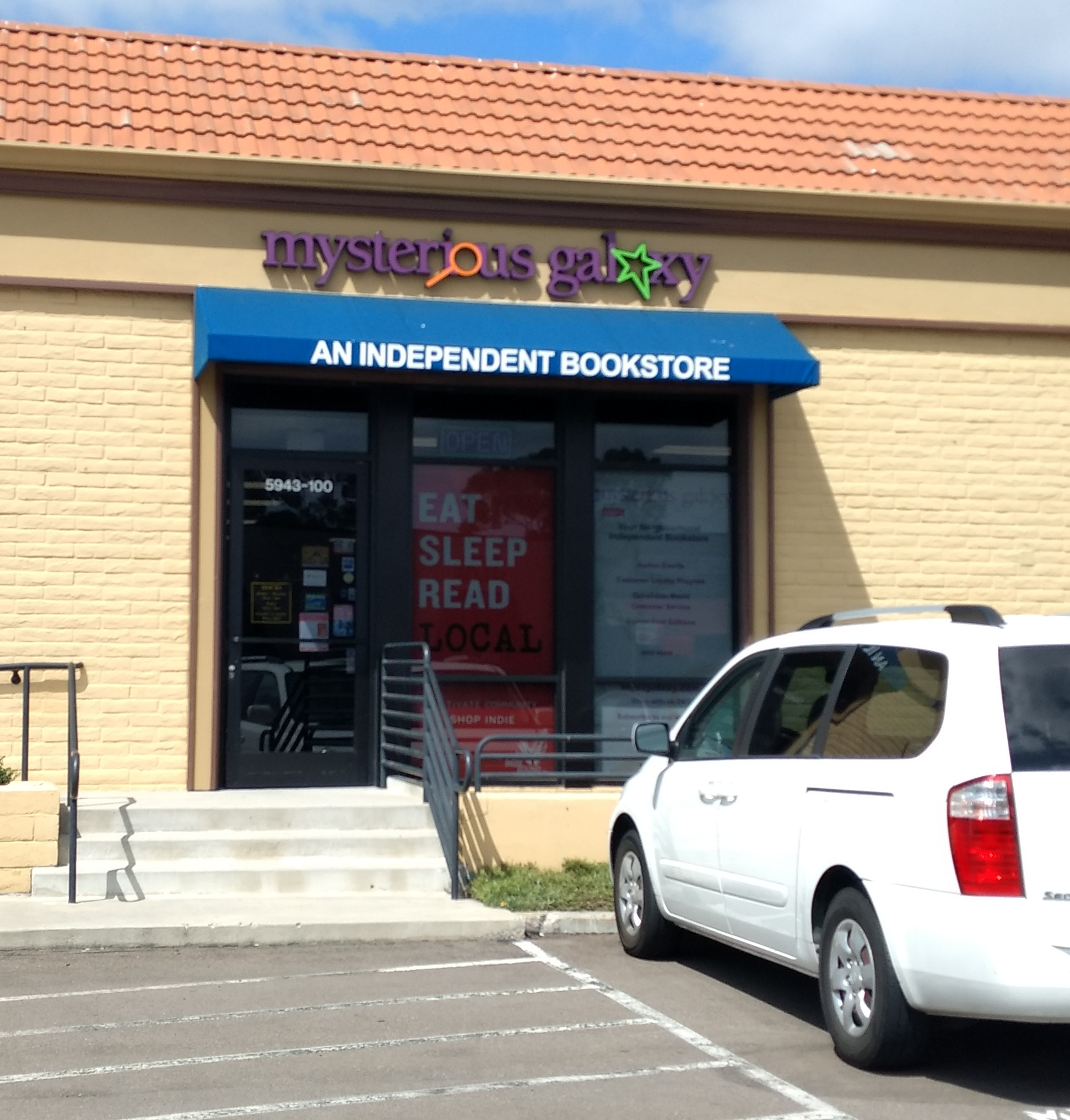
- Image of the store exterior
- Company type: Private
- Industry: Retail
- Founded: May 8, 1993
- Founder: Terry Gilman, Maryelizabeth Hart (Maryelizabeth Yturralde), and Jeff Mariotte
- Headquarters: San Diego
- Products: Books
- Website: Official site

Mysterious Galaxy is an independent bookstore in San Diego, California. It was founded in 1993 and caters mostly to fans of genre fiction, such as mystery, fantasy, science fiction, and horror. It is noted for hosting book signings and readings by numerous authors of the genres.

== History ==
On May 8, 1993 Terry Gilman, Maryelizabeth Hart, and Jeff Mariotte hosted the grand opening of Mysterious Galaxy with prominent authors such as Ray Bradbury, David Brin, and Robert Crais in attendance, as well as many fans of genre fiction. With the tagline "Books of Martians, Murder, Magic and Mayhem" Mysterious Galaxy has filled the niche of San Diego's most prominent genre bookstore.

Mysterious Galaxy opened a second location in Redondo Beach in mid-2011, which closed in 2014.

In 2019, Mysterious Galaxy sought a new owner and new location and was subsequently purchased by Matthew Berger and Jenni Marchisotto.
