= Cory Doctorow =

Canadian-British writer (born 1971)

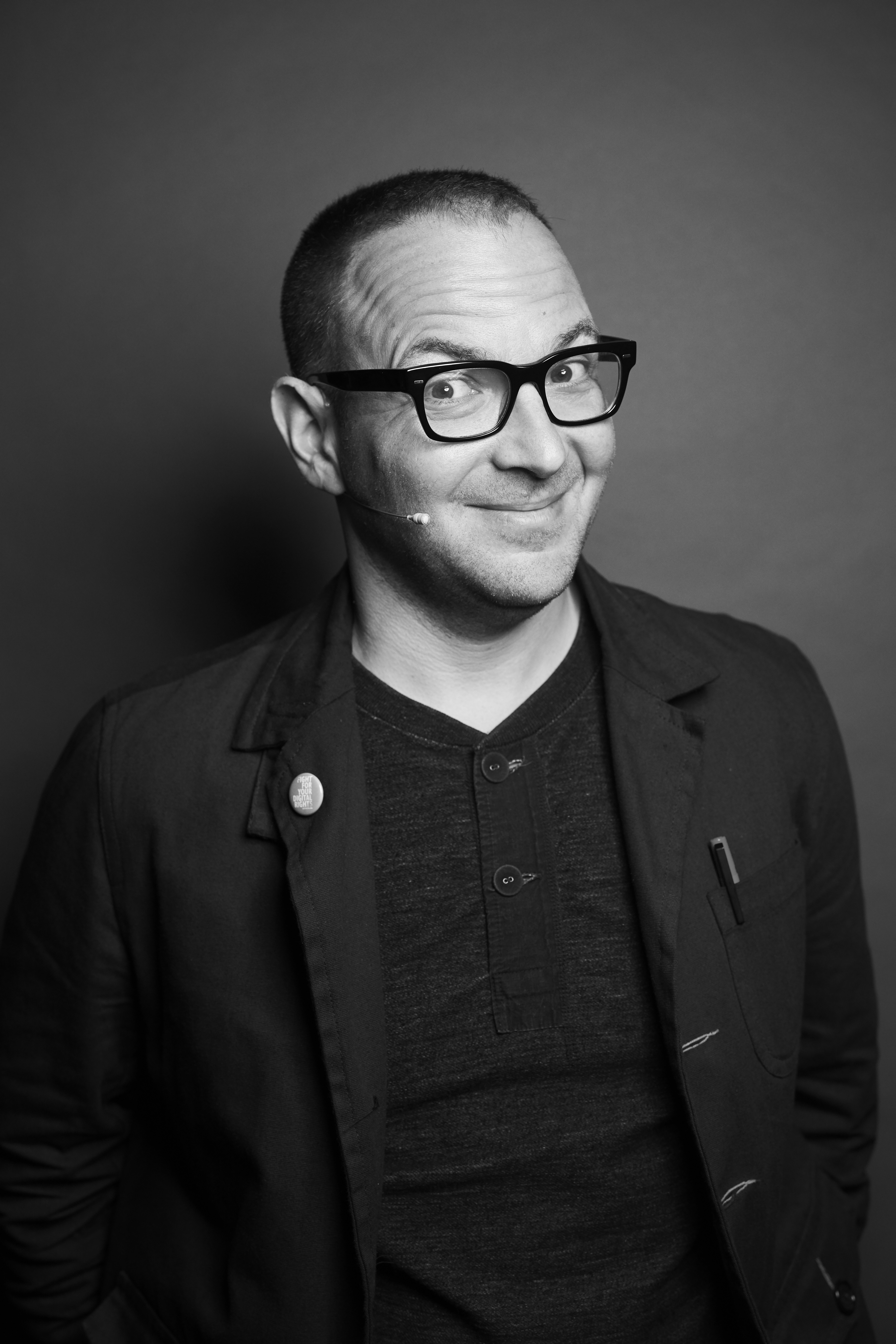
- Doctorow in 2019
- Born: 17 July 1971 (age 55); Toronto, Ontario, Canada
- Occupations: Author, blogger
- Spouse: Alice Taylor (m. 2008)
- Children: 1
- Writing career
- Genres: Science fiction, postcyberpunk
- Notable works: Down and Out in the Magic Kingdom; Little Brother
- Notable awards: John W. Campbell Award for Best New Writer; John W. Campbell Memorial Award; Prometheus Award; Sunburst Award
- Website: pluralistic.net

Cory Efram Doctorow (/ˈdɒktəroʊ/; born 17 July 1971) is a Canadian-British blogger, journalist, and science fiction author who served as co-editor of the blog Boing Boing. He is an activist in favour of liberalising copyright laws and a proponent of the Creative Commons organisation, using some of its licences for his books. Some common themes of his work include digital rights management, file sharing, and post-scarcity economics.

== Life and career ==
Cory Efram Doctorow was born in Toronto, on 17 July 1971. He is of Ashkenazi Jewish descent. His paternal grandfather was born in what became Poland and his paternal grandmother was from Leningrad, Russia (St. Petersburg). Both fled Nazi Germany's advance eastward during World War II, and as a result Doctorow's father was born in a displaced persons camp near Baku, Azerbaijan. His grandparents and father migrated to Canada from the Soviet Union. Doctorow's mother's family were Ukrainian-Russian Romanians.

Doctorow is a friend of Columbia law professor Tim Wu, dating back to their time together in elementary school. Doctorow went to summer camp as a young teenager at what he has described as a "hippy summer camp" at Grindstone Island, near Portland, Ontario, that was influential on his intellectual life and development. He quit high school, received his Ontario Academic Credit (high school diploma) from the SEED School in Toronto.

Cory Doctorow has stated both that he is not related to the American novelist E. L. Doctorow, and that he may be a third cousin once removed of the novelist. Thomas Rankin in Guide to Literary Masters & Their Works (2007) describes Doctorow as "a distant cousin of author E.L. Doctorow".

In June 1999, Doctorow co-founded the free software P2P company Opencola with John Henson and Grad Conn, which was sold to the Open Text Corporation of Waterloo, Ontario, in the summer of 2003. The company used a drink called OpenCola as part of its promotional campaign.

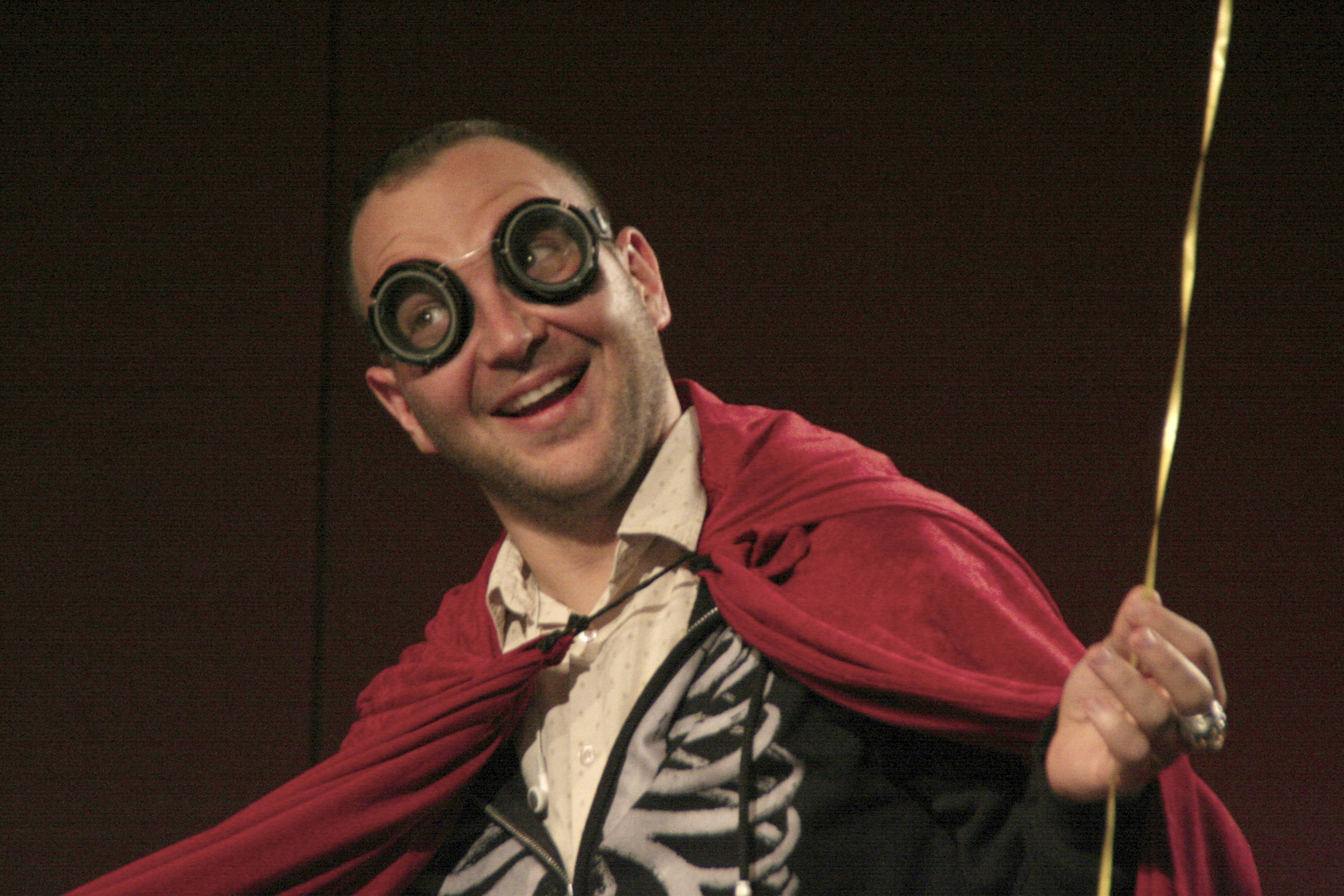
Doctorow at eTech 2007, wearing a cape and goggles in reference to his depiction in webcomic xkcd

Doctorow later relocated to London and worked as European Affairs Coordinator for the Electronic Frontier Foundation (EFF) for four years, helping to establish the Open Rights Group, before leaving the EFF to pursue writing full-time in January 2006; Doctorow remained a Fellow of the EFF for some time after his departure from the EFF Staff. He was named the 2006–2007 Canadian Fulbright Chair for Public Diplomacy at the USC Center on Public Diplomacy, sponsored jointly by the Royal Fulbright Commission, the Integrated Media Systems Center, and the University of Southern California (USC) Center on Public Diplomacy. The professorship included a one-year writing and teaching residency at the University of Southern California in Los Angeles, United States. He then returned to London, but remained a frequent public speaker on copyright issues.

In 2009, Doctorow became the first Independent Studies Scholar in Virtual Residence at the University of Waterloo in Ontario. He had been a student in the program during 1993–94, but had left without completing a thesis. Doctorow was also a visiting professor at the Open University in the United Kingdom from September 2009 to August 2010. In 2012 he was awarded an honorary doctorate from The Open University.

Doctorow married Alice Taylor in October 2008; they have a daughter named Poesy Emmeline Fibonacci Nautilus Taylor Doctorow, who was born in 2008. Doctorow became a British citizen by naturalisation on 12 August 2011.

In 2015, Doctorow decided to leave London and move to Los Angeles, expressing disappointment at what he termed London's "death" after British voters' choice of a Conservative government. He stated at the time: "London is a city whose two priorities are being a playground for corrupt global elites who turn neighbourhoods into soulless collections of empty safe-deposit boxes in the sky, and encouraging the feckless criminality of the finance industry. These two facts are not unrelated." He rejoined the EFF in January 2015 to campaign for the eradication of digital rights management (DRM).

Doctorow left Boing Boing in January 2020, and soon started a solo blogging project titled Pluralistic. The circumstances surrounding Doctorow's exit from the website were unclear at the time, although Doctorow acknowledged that he remained a co-owner of Boing Boing. Given the end of the 19-year association between Doctorow and Boing Boing, MetaFilter described this news as "the equivalent of the Beatles breaking up" for the blog world. Doctorow's exit was not acknowledged by Boing Boing, with his name being quietly removed from the list of editors on 29 January 2020.

In June 2026, he mentioned in an interview on the podcast Dreaming Against the Machine that he was undergoing treatment for cancer. He said about the cancer that ”it seems very treatable”. In a July 2026 interview on The Weekly Show with Jon Stewart, he announced that he was cancer-free.

=== Other work, activism, and fellowships ===
Doctorow served as Canadian Regional Director of the Science Fiction and Fantasy Writers of America in 2000. On 31 October 2005, Doctorow was involved in a controversy concerning digital rights management with Sony-BMG, as told in Wikinomics, a book by Don Tapscott and Anthony D. Williams. In 2007, together with Austrian art group monochrom, he initiated the Instant Blitz Copy Fight project, which asks people from all over the world to take flash pictures of copyright warnings in movie theatres.

As a user of the Tor anonymity network for more than a decade during his global travels, Doctorow publicly supports the network; furthermore, Boing Boing operates a "high speed, high-quality exit node." Doctorow was the keynote speaker at the July 2016 Hackers on Planet Earth conference. He also presented on enshittification at the 2024 conference, HOPE XV. In July 2024 Doctorow was appointed by Cornell University to be an A.D. White Professor-at-large for a six-year term.

In 2026, Doctorow endorsed Avi Lewis in that year's federal NDP leadership race.

== Fiction ==
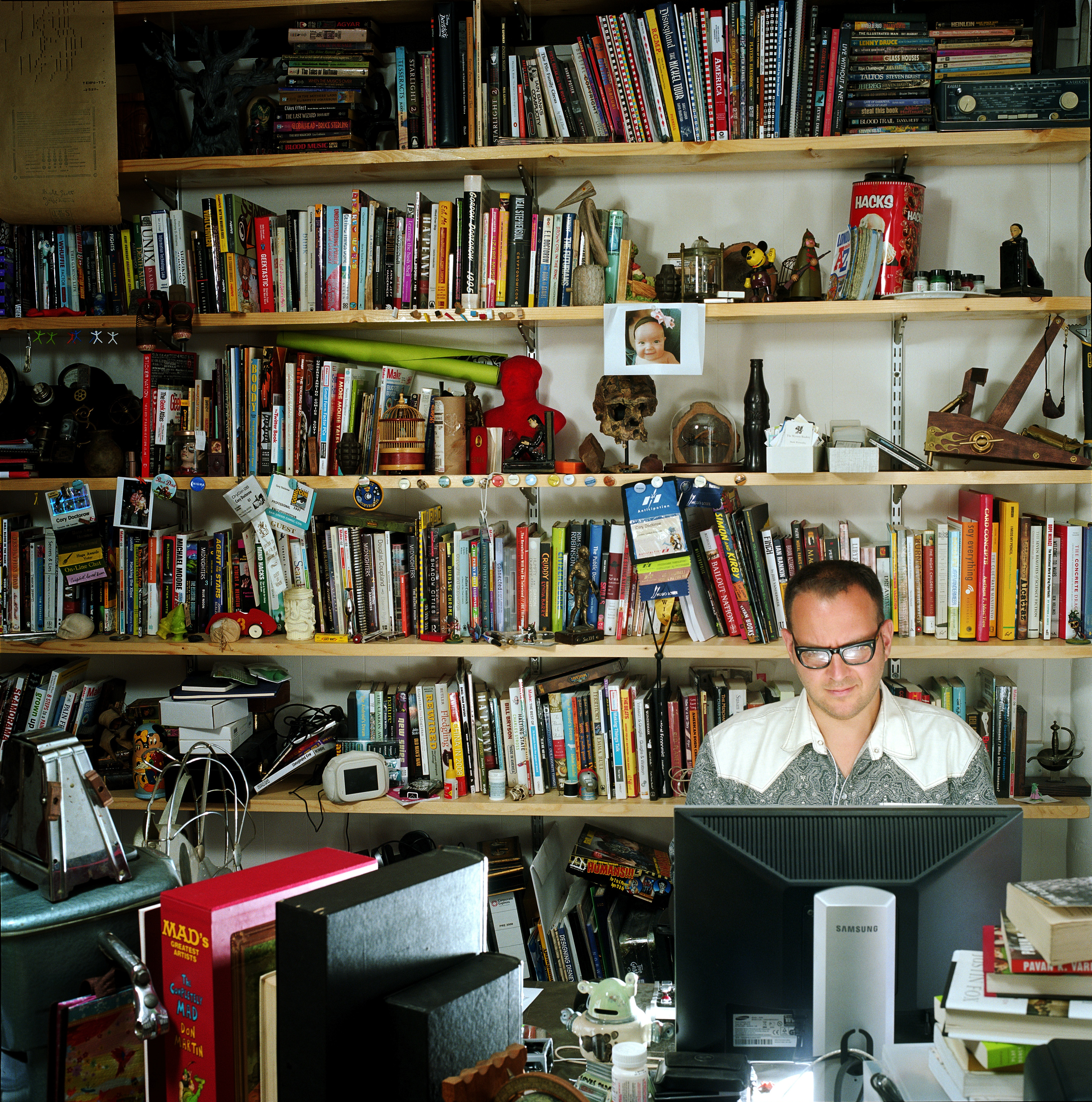
Doctorow in his office, 2009

Doctorow began selling fiction when he was 17 years old, and sold several stories, followed by publication of the story "Craphound" in 1998. Down and Out in the Magic Kingdom, Doctorow's first novel, was published in January 2003, and was the first novel released under one of the Creative Commons licences, allowing readers to circulate the electronic edition as long as they neither made money from it nor used it to create derived works. The electronic edition was released simultaneously with the print edition. In February 2004, it was re-released with a different Creative Commons licence that allowed derivative works such as fan fiction, but still prohibited commercial usage. Down and Out... was nominated for a Nebula Award, and won the Locus Award for Best First Novel in 2004. A semi-sequel short story named Truncat was published on Salon.com in August 2003.

His Sunburst Award-winning short-story collection A Place So Foreign and Eight More was published in 2004: "0wnz0red" from this collection was nominated for the 2004 Nebula Award for Best Novelette. His novel Someone Comes to Town, Someone Leaves Town, published in June 2005, was chosen to launch the Sci-Fi Channel's book club, Sci-Fi Essentials (now defunct).

Doctorow released the bestselling novel Little Brother in 2008 with a Creative Commons Attribution-Noncommercial-ShareAlike licence. It was nominated for a Hugo Award for Best Novel in 2009, and won the 2009 Prometheus Award, Sunburst Award, and the 2009 John W. Campbell Memorial Award. His novel Makers was released in October 2009, and was serialised for free on the Tor Books website.

Doctorow released another young adult novel, For the Win, in May 2010. The novel is available free on the author's website as a Creative Commons download, and is also published in traditional paper format by Tor Books. The book is about "greenfarming", and concerns massively multiplayer online role-playing games. Another short-story collection, With a Little Help, was released in printed format on 3 May 2011. It is a project to demonstrate the profitability of Doctorow's method of releasing his books in print and subsequently for free under Creative Commons.

In September 2012, Doctorow released The Rapture of the Nerds, a novel written in collaboration with Charles Stross. In October of the same year, the young adult novel Pirate Cinema was released in October 2012. It won the 2013 Prometheus Award. In February 2013, Doctorow released Homeland, the sequel to his novel Little Brother. It won the 2014 Prometheus Award (Doctorow's third novel to win this award). His novel Walkaway was released in 2017.

In March 2019, Doctorow released Radicalised, a collection of four self-contained science-fiction novellas dealing with how life in America could be in the near future. The book was selected for the 2020 edition of Canada Reads, in which it was defended by Akil Augustine. Attack Surface, a standalone adult novel set in the "Little Brother" universe, was released on 13 October 2020. His novel called Red Team Blues, a financial thriller about cybersecurity, was released in April 2023. It features a character named Martin Hench. A standalone hopepunk novel The Lost Cause, set in 2050s California about mitigating and surviving climate change impacts amidst the legacy of contemporary political divisions, was published in November 2023.A second novel featuring forensic accountant Martin Hench was published in February 2024.The Bezzle is centred around the financial (mis-)management of privately owned prisons. A third Martin Hench novel, Picks and Shovels, was published by Tor Books in February 2025: the origin story of Martin Hench and the most powerful new tool for crime ever invented: the personal computer.

== Nonfiction and other writings ==
Doctorow's nonfiction works include his first book, The Complete Idiot's Guide to Publishing Science Fiction (co-written with Karl Schroeder and published in 2000), his contributions to Boing Boing (the blog he co-edited), as well as regular columns in the magazines Popular Science and Make. He is a contributing writer to Wired magazine, and contributes occasionally to other magazines and newspapers such as the New York Times Sunday Magazine, The Globe and Mail, Asimov's Science Fiction magazine, and the Boston Globe.

In 2004, he wrote an essay on Wikipedia included in The Anthology at the End of the Universe, comparing Internet attempts at Hitchhiker's Guide-type resources, including a discussion of the Wikipedia article about himself. Doctorow contributed the foreword to Sound Unbound: Sampling Digital Music and Culture (The MIT Press, 2008) edited by Paul D. Miller a.k.a. DJ Spooky. He also was a contributing writer to the book Worldchanging: A User's Guide for the 21st Century.

He popularised the term "metacrap" in a 2001 essay titled "Metacrap: Putting the torch to seven straw-men of the meta-utopia." Some of his nonfiction published between 2001 and 2007 has been collected by Tachyon Publications as Content: Selected Essays on Technology, Creativity, Copyright, and the Future of the Future. In 2016, he wrote the article Mr. Robot Killed the Hollywood-Hacker (published on MIT Technology Review) as a review of the TV show Mr. Robot and argued for a better portrayal and understanding of technology, computers and their risks and consequences in our modern world.

His essay "You Can't Own Knowledge" is included in the Freesouls book project. He is the originator of Doctorow's Law: "Anytime someone puts a lock on something you own, against your wishes, and doesn't give you the key, they're not doing it for your benefit." Writing in The Guardian in 2022, Doctorow listed the many problems confronting Facebook and suggested that its future would be increasingly fraught.

== Opinions ==
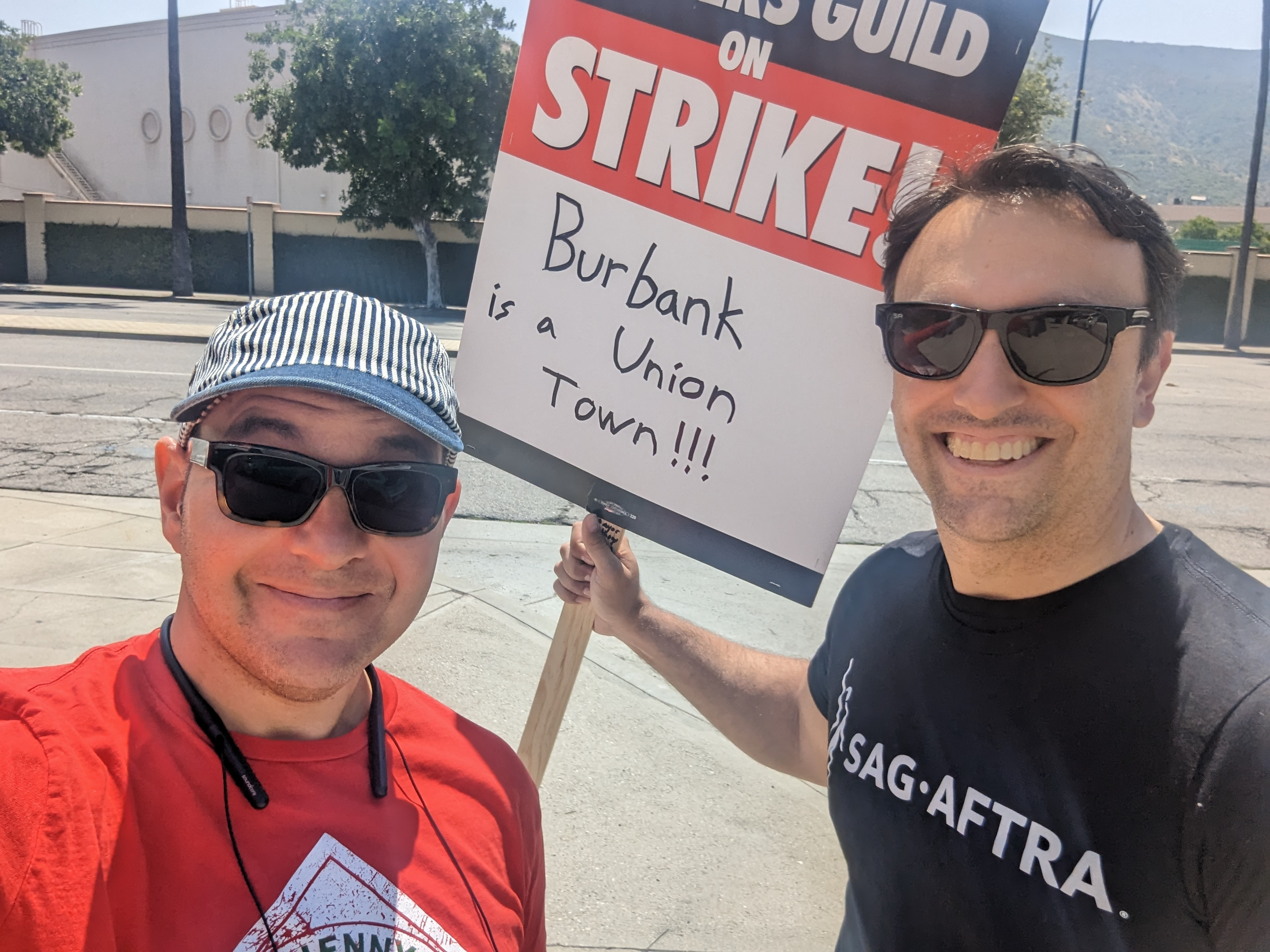
Doctorow (left), alongside Mayor of Burbank, Konstantine Anthony, picketing in support of the 2023 Writers Guild of America strike

=== Intellectual property ===
Doctorow believes that copyright laws should be liberalised to allow for free sharing of all digital media. He has also advocated filesharing. He argues that copyright holders should have a monopoly on selling their own digital media and that copyright laws should not be operative unless someone attempts to sell a product that is under someone else's copyright.

Doctorow is an opponent of digital rights management and claims that it limits the free sharing of digital media and frequently causes problems for legitimate users (including registration problems that lock users out of their own purchases and prevent them from being able to move their media to other devices).

He was a keynote speaker at the 2014 international conference CopyCamp in Warsaw, Poland with the presentation "Information Doesn't Want to Be Free."

=== Enshittification ===
In criticising the decay in usefulness of online platforms, Doctorow in 2022 popularised the neologism enshittification, (which he calls enpoopification on public airwaves) which he defines as a degradation of an online environment caused by greed:

Here is how platforms die: first, they are good to their users; then they abuse their users to make things better for their business customers; finally, they abuse those business customers to claw back all the value for themselves. Then, they die. I call this enshittification, and it is a seemingly inevitable consequence arising from the combination of the ease of changing how a platform allocates value, combined with the nature of a "two-sided market," where a platform sits between buyers and sellers, hold each hostage to the other, raking off an ever-larger share of the value that passes between them.

The word gained traction in 2023, when it was used by a variety of sources in reference to several major platforms discontinuing free features to further their monetisation or taking other actions that were seen to degrade functionality. In its annual vote, the American Dialect Society designated enshittification as 2023's Word of the Year.

In November 2024, the Australian Macquarie Dictionary selected it as its word of the year, defining it as follows:

The gradual deterioration of a service or product brought about by a reduction in the quality of service provided, especially of an online platform, and as a consequence of profit-seeking.

Doctorow expanded upon the term in a full length book entitled Enshittification: Why Everything Suddenly Got Worse and What To Do About It, published in 2025.

== Awards ==
- 2000 John W. Campbell Award for Best New Writer
- 2004 Locus Award for Best First Novel for Down and Out in the Magic Kingdom
- 2004 Sunburst Award for A Place So Foreign and Eight More
- 2006 Locus Award for Best Novelette for "I, Robot"
- 2007 Locus Award for Best Novelette for "When Sysadmins Ruled the Earth"
- 2007 The Electronic Frontier Foundation Pioneer Award
- 2026 Locus Award for Best Non-fiction for Enshittification

=== For Little Brother ===
- 2009 John W. Campbell Memorial Award
- 2009 Prometheus Award
- 2009 Sunburst Award
- 2009 White Pine Award
- 2018 Inkpot Award

=== For Pirate Cinema ===
- 2013 Prometheus Award

=== For Homeland ===
- 2014 Prometheus Award

== Selected bibliography ==
In chronological sequence, unless otherwise indicated:

=== Fiction ===
==== Novels ====
- Down and Out in the Magic Kingdom. Tor. 2003. ISBN 0-7653-0436-8.
- Eastern Standard Tribe. Tor. 2004. ISBN 0-7653-0759-6.
- Someone Comes to Town, Someone Leaves Town. Tor. 2005. ISBN 0-7653-1278-6.
- Makers. Tor. 2009. ISBN 978-0-7653-1279-2.
- For the Win. Tor. 2010. ISBN 978-0-7653-2216-6.
- The Great Big Beautiful Tomorrow, 2011, ISBN 978-1-6048-6404-5
- The Rapture of the Nerds. Tor. September 2012. ISBN 978-0-765-32910-3. (with Charles Stross)
- Pirate Cinema. Tor. 2012. ISBN 978-0-7653-2908-0.
- Walkaway. Tor. 2017. ISBN 978-0-7653-9276-3.
- The Lost Cause. Tor. 2023. ISBN 978-1-0359-0223-1.

===== Little Brother Universe =====
- Little Brother. Tom Doherty Associates. 2008. ISBN 978-0-7653-1985-2.
- Homeland. Tor. 2013. ISBN 978-0-7653-3369-8.
- Attack Surface. Head of Zeus. 2020. ISBN 978-1-8389-3996-0.

===== Martin Hench series =====
- Red Team Blues. Head of Zeus. 2023. ISBN 978-1-8045-4774-8.
- The Bezzle. Tor Books. 2024. ISBN 978-1250865878.
- Picks and Shovels. Tor Books. 2025. ISBN 9781250865908.

==== Graphic novels ====
- In Real Life. Illustrated by Jen Wang. First Second. 2014. ISBN 978-1596436589.
- Poesy the Monster Slayer. Illustrated by Matt Rockefeller. First Second. 2020. ISBN 978-1626723627.

==== Collections ====
- A Place So Foreign and Eight More. Four Walls Eight Windows. 2003. ISBN 1568582862. or ISBN 978-1-5685-8286-3
- Overclocked: Stories of the Future Present. Thunder's Mouth Press. 2007. ISBN 978-1560259817.
- With a Little Help. Cor-Doc Co. 2009. ISBN 9780557943050.
  - Other instance: With a little help. CreateSpace. 2011. ISBN 9781456576349.
- Radicalized. Tor. 19 March 2019. ISBN 978-1-2502-2858-1.

==== Short fiction ====
Title	Year	First published in	Reprinted in
Craphound	1998	Science Fiction Age, March 1998	Northern Suns (Tor, 1999, David Hartwell and Glenn Grant, editors); Year's Best Science Fiction XVI (Morrow, 1999, Gardner Dozois, editor); Hayakawa Science Fiction Magazine (Japan) 2001
The Super Man and the Bugout	1998	DailyLit	
Return to Pleasure Island	2000	Realms of Fantasy	Helgadottir, Margrét, ed. (2019). American Monsters Part 2. Fox Spirit Books. ISBN 978-1910462294.
0wnz0red	2002	?	A Place So Foreign and Eight More. Four Walls Eight Windows. 2003. ISBN 1568582862.
Truncat	2002	?	The Bakka anthology. Bakka Books. 2002. ISBN 0973150831.
I, Row-Boat	2006	Flurb: a webzine of astonishing tales 1 (Fall 2006)	Overclocked: stories of the future present. Thunder's Mouth Press. 2007. ISBN 978-1560259817.
Scroogled	2007	Radar (Sep 2007)	With a Little help. Cor-Doc Co. 2009. ISBN 9780557943050.
The Things that Make Me Weak and Strange Get Engineered Away	2008	Tor.com	
When Sysadmins Ruled the Earth	2008	Jim Baen's Universe (Aug 2006)	Wastelands: Stories of the Apocalypse. Night Shade Books. 2008. ISBN 9781597801058.
True names (with Benjamin Rosenbaum)	2008	Anders, Lou, ed. (2008). Fast forward 2. Pyr. ISBN 9781591026921.	Kessel, John; Kelly, James Patrick, eds. (2012). Digital rapture: the singularity anthology. Tachyon. ISBN 9781616960704.
Chicken Little	2009	With a little help. Cor-Doc Co. 2009. ISBN 9780557943050.	Hull, Elizabeth Anne, ed. (2011). Gateways. Tor. ISBN 9780765326621.
There's a great big beautiful tomorrow / Now is the best time of your life	2010	Doctorow, C. (2010). Strahan, Jonathan (ed.). Godlike machines. Science Fiction Book Club. ISBN 9781616647599.	Doctorow, C. (2011). The great big beautiful tomorrow. PM Press. ISBN 9781604864045.
Clockwork Fagin	2011	Grant, Gavin J. and Link, Kelly, eds. (2011). Steampunk! Candlewick Press. ISBN 9780763660451	
Another Time, Another Place	2011	Van Allsburg (2011). The Chronicles of Harris Burdick: Fourteen Amazing Authors Tell the Tales ISBN 0547548109	
Lawful interception	2013	TOR.COM	
The Man Who Sold The Moon	2014	Boing Boing	
Car Wars	2016	Deakin University	
Party Discipline	2017	Tor.com	
The Canadian Miracle	2023	Reactor Magazine	
Spill	2024	Reactor Magazine	
Vigilant	2024	Reactor Magazine	

=== Non-fiction ===
- Doctorow, Cory; Schroeder, Karl (2000). The Complete Idiot's Guide to Publishing Science Fiction. Alpha. ISBN 0028639189.
- Doctorow, Cory; et al. (2002). Essential blogging. O'Reilly. ISBN 0596003889.
- Doctorow, Cory (1 February 2004). Ebooks : neither E, nor books. Project Gutenberg. Paper for the O'Reilly Emerging Technologies Conference, 2004.
- — (2005). "Wikipedia : a genuine H2G2, minus the editors". In Yeffeth, Glenn (ed.). The anthology at the end of the universe : leading science fiction authors on Douglas Adams' The hitchhiker's guide to the galaxy. BenBella. ISBN 9781932100563.
- — (2008). Content : selected essays on technology, creativity, copyright, and the future of the future. Tachyon. ISBN 9781892391810.
- — (2010). "You can't own knowledge". Freesouls.
- — (January 2010). "Close enough for rock 'n' roll". Locus (588): 29.
- — (2011). Context : further selected essays on productivity, creativity, parenting, and politics in the 21st Century. Tachyon. ISBN 9781616960483.
- — (2014). Information Doesn't Want to Be Free: Laws for the Internet Age. McSweeney's. ISBN 9781940450285.
- — (2 September 2017). "Demon-Haunted World". Locus Online.
- — (21 January 2021). How to Destroy Surveillance Capitalism. Medium Editions. ISBN 9781736205907.
- Giblin, Rebecca; Doctorow, Cory (27 September 2022). Chokepoint Capitalism. Beacon Press. ISBN 978-080700706-8.
- Doctorow, Cory (2023). The Internet Con: How to Seize the Means of Computation. Verso. ISBN 978-1-80429-216-7.
- — (7 October 2025). Enshittification: Why Everything Suddenly Got Worse and What to Do About It. MCD. ISBN 9780374619329.
- Doctorow, Cory (23 June 2026). The Reverse Centaur's Guide to Life After AI: How to Think About Artificial Intelligence—Before It's Too Late. MCD. ISBN 9780374621575.

=== Anthology ===
- Tesseracts Eleven with Holly Phillips (2007)
