= Alongside Night (film) =

- Directed by: J. Neil Schulman
- Screenplay by: J. Neil Schulman
- Based on: Alongside Night (1979 novel) by J. Neil Schulman
- Produced by: J. Neil Schulman
- Starring: Kevin Sorbo; Christian Kramme; Reid Cox; Jake Busey; Tim Russ; Garrett Wang; Gary Graham; Sam Sorbo
- Cinematography: Pat Kerby; Scott MacDonald
- Edited by: J. Kent Hastings; J. Neil Schulman
- Music by: Daniel May
- Production companies: Jesulu Productions; Braeburn Entertainment; Stonegait Pictures
- Distributed by: Tugg
- Release date: July 14, 2014
- Running time: 112 minutes
- Country: United States
- Language: English

Alongside Night is a 2014 political science-fiction film written, produced, directed, and edited by J. Neil Schulman, based on his 1979 novel. It stars Kevin Sorbo, Christian Kramme, Reid Cox, Jake Busey, Tim Russ, Garrett Wang, and Gary Graham.

The novel and film expound the principals of Agorism, a libertarian and anarcho-capitalist political ideology. The film was produced independently by several prominent libertarians, and premiered on July 14, 2014.

== Cast ==
- Kevin Sorbo as Dr. Martin Vreeland
- Christian Kramme as Elliot Vreeland
- Reid Cox as Lorimer
- Said Faraj as Sam Shalhoub
- Tim Russ as General Jack Guerdon
- Garrett Wang as Major Chin
- Gary Graham as Lawrence Powers
- Eric Colton as Philip Gross
- Ethan Keogh as Dr. Murray Konkin
- Sam Sorbo as Cathryn Vreeland
- Jake Busey as The President
- Mara Marini as Candy
- Valence Thomas as Tzigane
- Kyle Leatherberry as Larry Pournelle
- Adam Meir as Morris Gross
- J. Neil Schulman as Al
- Rebekah Kennedy as Marilyn Danforth
- Charlie Morgan Patton as Denise Vreeland
- Tom Slaughter as Monahan Scott
- Susan Smythe as Sharon Tucker
- Darren Robertson as Harry Tucker
- Dan Hewitt Owens as Danny
- Richard Hatch as The Silicon Assassin
- Brad Linaweaver as Curtis H. Landy
- Ann Lippert as Millicent Tobias
- Adam Kokesh as himself
- Dennis Hof as himself
- Ron Paul as himself
- Jordan Page as himself

== Production ==
The film was independently produced by several prominent libertarians, including Austin Petersen and Rich Iott. The film was shot entirely in Las Vegas and Henderson, Nevada, with principal photography lasting two years. Some scenes were shot at area libertarian and sci-fi conventions.

The cast stars Kevin Sorbo as Martin Vreeland, Christian Kramme as Elliot, Reid Cox as Lorimer, Sam Sorbo as Cathryn, and Jake Busey as The President. Several members of the science fiction and libertarian community were involved in the production and make on-screen appearances; including Star Trek actors Tim Russ, Garrett Wang, and Gary Graham, author Brad Linaweaver, and activist Adam Kokesh.

The production completed in 2013.

== Release ==
The film premiered July 14, 2014 at the Lumiere Music Hall in Beverly Hills, California, played in limited theatrical release from Tugg.com, released for streaming on iTunes in 2014, was released July 8, 2015 as a Blu-ray/DVD Combo Pack, and released in 2015 for streaming on Amazon Video and Amazon Prime.
