= 2016 United States presidential election in Nebraska =

- November 8, 2016
- Turnout: 63.80% ▲

Nominee	Donald Trump	Hillary Clinton
Party	Republican	Democratic
Home state	New York	New York
Running mate	Mike Pence	Tim Kaine
Electoral vote	5	0
Popular vote	495,961	284,494
Percentage	58.75%	33.70%

Trump
40–50%
50–60%
60–70%
70–80%
80–90%
90–100%
Clinton
40–50%
50–60%
60–70%
70–80%
80–90%
90–100%
Tie/No Data
President before election
Barack Obama
Democratic
Elected President
Donald Trump
Republican

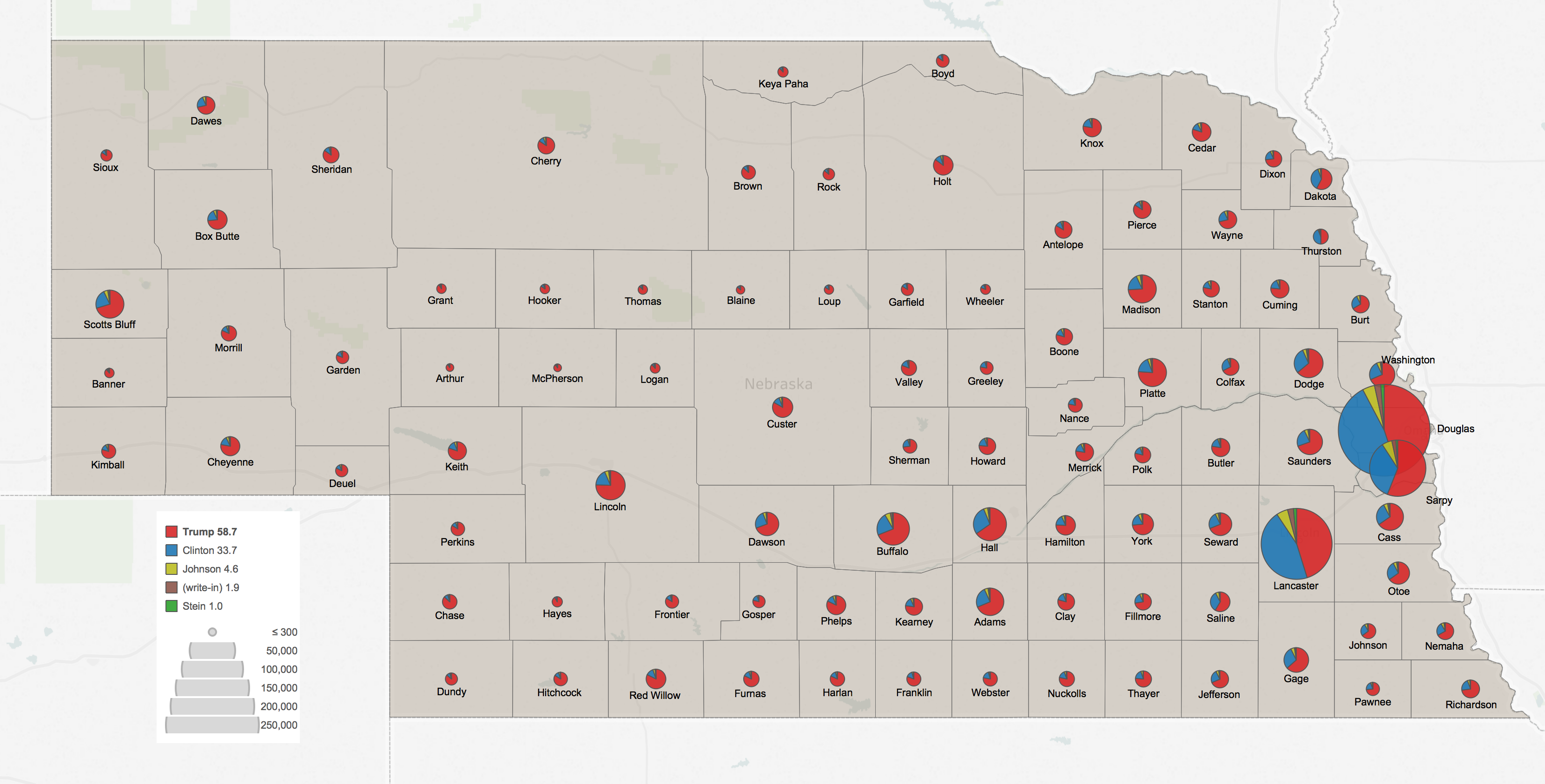
Results by county showing number of votes by size and candidates by color

Treemap of the popular vote by county

The 2016 United States presidential election in Nebraska was held on Tuesday, November 8, 2016, as part of the 2016 United States presidential election in which all 50 states plus the District of Columbia participated. Nebraska voters chose electors to represent them in the Electoral College via a popular vote, pitting the Republican Party's nominee, businessman Donald Trump, and running mate Indiana Governor Mike Pence against Democratic Party nominee, former Secretary of State Hillary Clinton, and her running mate Virginia Senator Tim Kaine. Nebraska has five electoral votes in the Electoral College, two from the state at large, and one each from the three congressional districts.

Prior to the election, Nebraska was considered to be a state Trump would win or a safe red state. The state is located in the heavily conservative Great Plains and was projected to vote for Trump by a wide margin. However, Nebraska is one of the two states (the other being Maine) where electoral votes are split based on congressional districts; the statewide winner receives two electoral votes and the remaining three electoral votes are awarded to the winner of each congressional district.

Trump carried the state with 58.7% of the vote, while Clinton received 33.7%, a margin of 25%. Trump also won all three congressional districts, thus winning all 5 of the state's electoral votes.

Although Trump improved on Romney's margin statewide, his margin in Nebraska's 2nd notably decreased; Trump won NE-02 with a plurality of 47% (137,264 votes) to Clinton's 45% (130,844 votes) with a notable increase in third-party voting. This was the most recent presidential election when Nebraska's 2nd congressional district would vote Republican, and thus, Nebraska's 2nd district was the only electoral vote that voted for Trump in 2016 that did not vote for him in 2024.

== Caucuses and primaries ==
=== Democratic caucus ===
The 2016 Nebraska Democratic caucuses was held on March 15, 2016, as part of a series of primary elections to decide the 2016 Democratic nominee for president. Senator Bernie Sanders won a commanding victory in Nebraska, winning rural areas along with big cities such as Omaha and Lincoln. This was the last Democratic primary in Nebraska held via the caucus method, the state party switched to a standard popular vote to decide the allocation of delegates in future elections including 2020. In 2016, the Nebraska caucuses occurred on the same dates as Kansas and Louisiana, the former being won handily by Sanders, while the latter was won in a landslide by the eventual nominee Hillary Clinton.

Results of the Democratic caucuses by county Bernie Sanders Hillary Clinton

Democratic presidential caucuses

Nebraska Democratic caucuses, March 5, 2016
Candidate	Popular vote		Estimated delegates		
Candidate	Count	Percentage	Pledged	Unpledged	Total
Bernie Sanders	19,120	57.14%	15	1	16
Hillary Clinton	14,340	42.86%	10	3	13
Uncommitted	—N/a		0	1	1
Total	33,460	100%	25	5	30

Democratic presidential primary (non-binding)
The Nebraska Democratic primary was held on May 10, 2016. The primary does not bind delegates. Delegates were bound by the caucuses on March 5, 2016.

Nebraska Democratic primary, May 10, 2016
Candidate	Popular vote		Estimated delegates		
Candidate	Count	Percentage	Pledged	Unpledged	Total
Hillary Clinton	42,692	53.08%	—N/a		
Bernie Sanders	37,744	46.92%	—N/a		
Total	80,436	100%	—N/a		

=== Republican primary ===
Twelve candidates appeared on the Republican presidential primary ballot:

- Ben Carson (withdrawn)
- Ted Cruz (withdrawn)
- John Kasich (withdrawn)
- Marco Rubio (withdrawn)
- Donald Trump

Nebraska Republican primary, May 10, 2016
Candidate	Votes	Percentage	Actual delegate count		
Candidate	Votes	Percentage	Bound	Unbound	Total
Donald Trump	122,327	61.47%	36	0	36
Ted Cruz (withdrawn)	36,703	18.44%	0	0	0
John Kasich (withdrawn)	22,709	11.41%	0	0	0
Ben Carson (withdrawn)	10,016	5.03%	0	0	0
Marco Rubio (withdrawn)	7,233	3.63%	0	0	0
Unprojected delegates:			0	0	0
Total:	198,988	100.00%	36	0	36
Source: The Green Papers

=== Libertarian primary ===
2016 Nebraska Libertarian presidential primary
- May 10, 2016
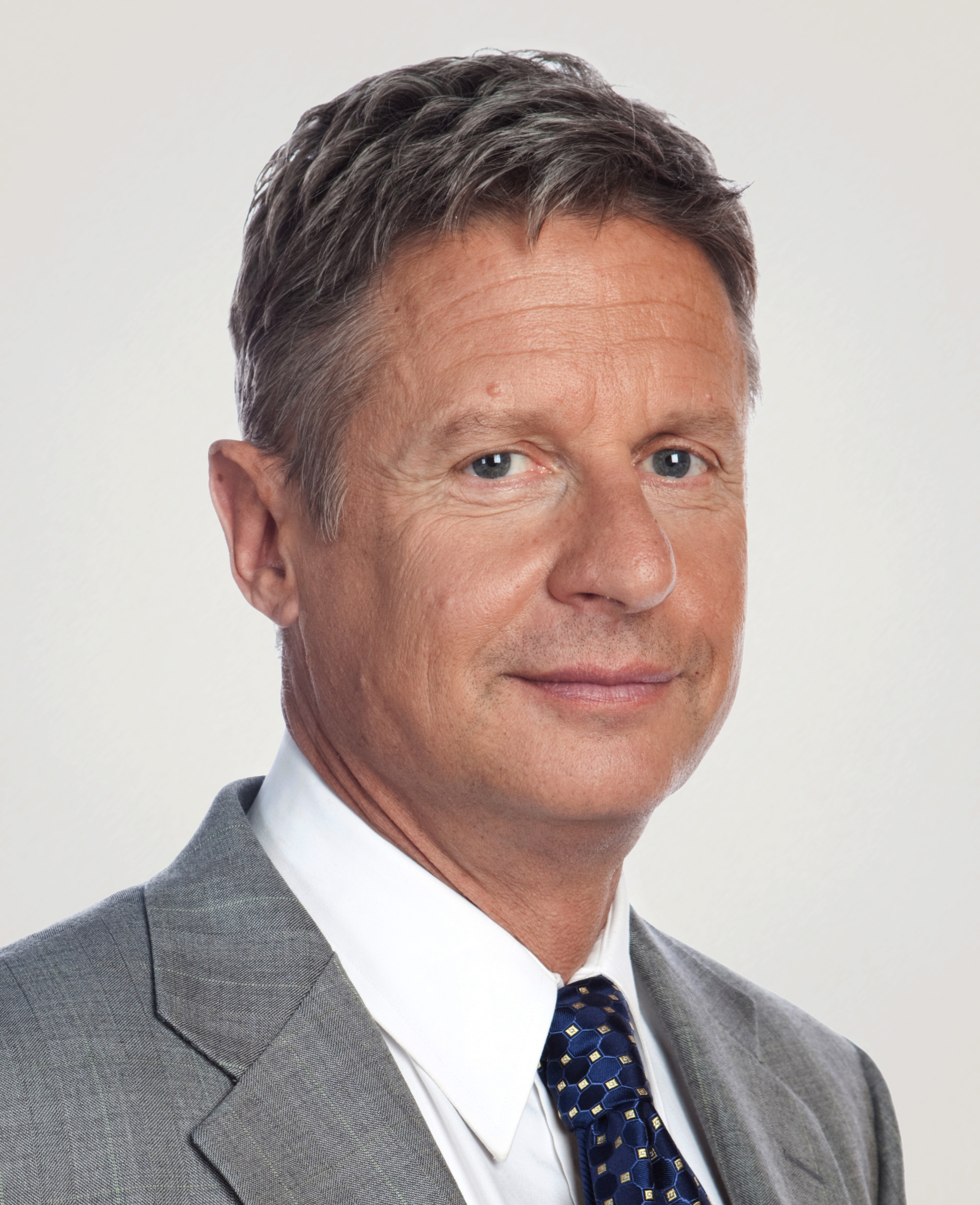

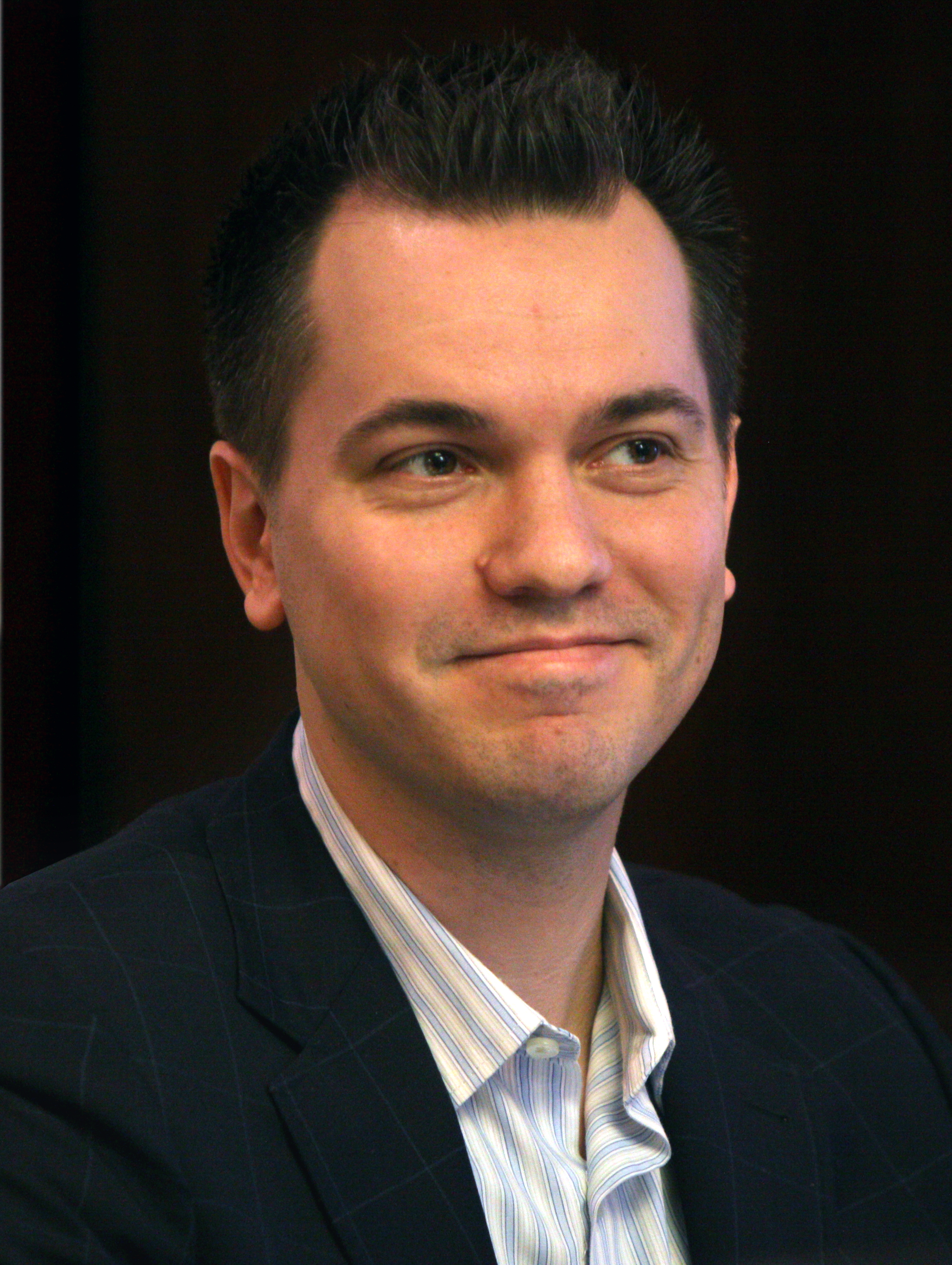

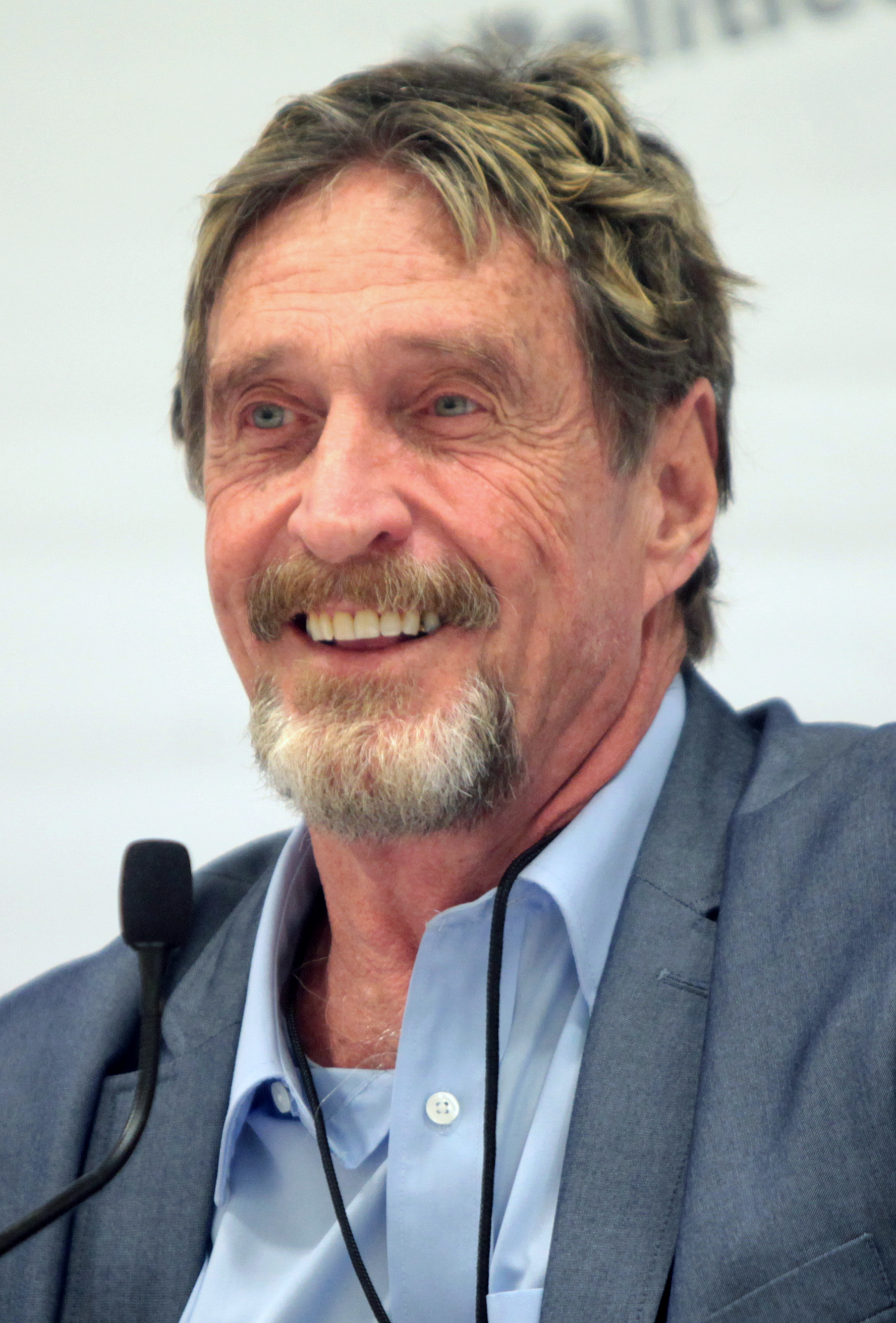

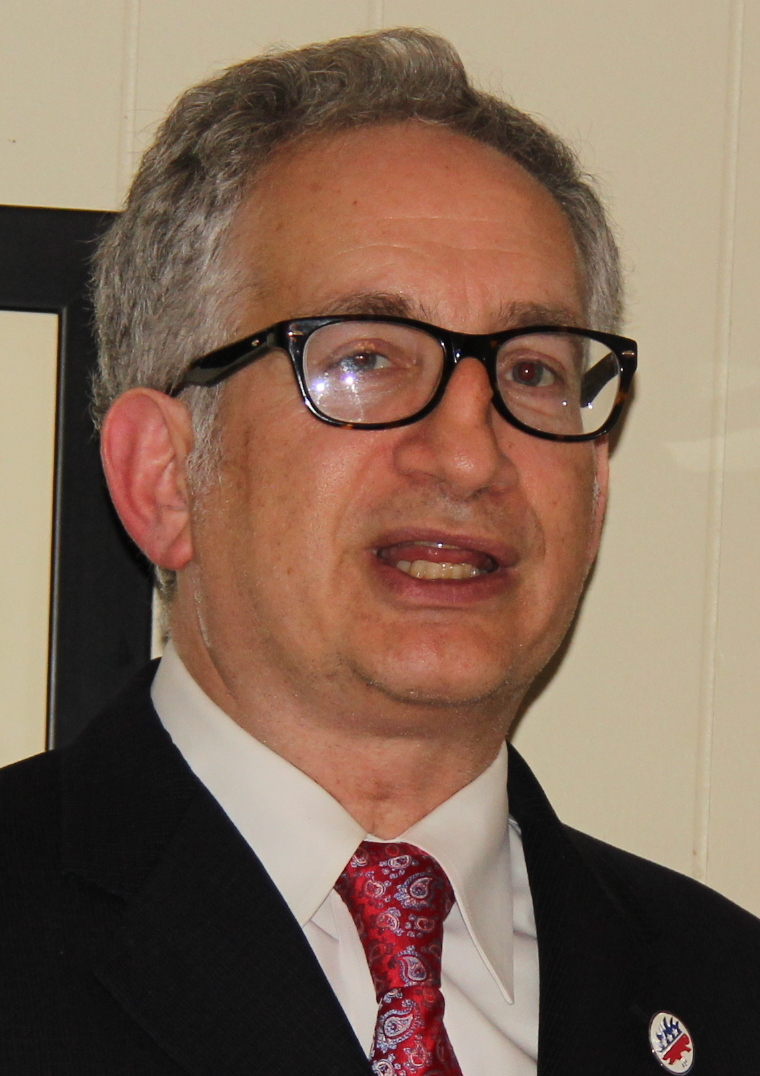
Candidate	Gary Johnson	Austin Petersen
Home state	New Mexico	Missouri
Popular vote	375	135
Percentage	52.08%	18.75%
Candidate	John McAfee	Marc Allan Feldman
Home state	Tennessee	Ohio
Popular vote	124	47
Percentage	17.22%	6.53%
County results
Gary Johnson
Austin Petersen
John McAfee
Marc Allen Feldman
Tie
No votes
(Note: Italicization indicates a withdrawn candidacy)

The Nebraska primary was held on May 10, 2016. Independents and registered Libertarians were allowed to vote in the state's Libertarian primary. The Nebraska Primary marked the third large victory for Gary Johnson in the handful of states that conduct Libertarian presidential primaries. However, since the Libertarian Party does not use such primaries for selecting delegates to its national nominating convention, the results were effectively non-binding.

2016 Nebraska Libertarian primary
Candidate	Popular vote	
Candidate	Count	Percentage
Gary Johnson	375	52.08%
Austin Petersen	135	18.75%
John McAfee	124	17.22%
Marc Allan Feldman	47	6.53%
Steve Kerbel	35	4.86%
Total:	720	100%

== General election ==
=== Polling ===
1st Congressional District

Poll source	Date(s) administered	Sample size	Margin of error	Hillary Clinton (D)	Donald Trump (R)	Gary Johnson (L)	Other	Undecided
Emerson College	September 25–27, 2016	233		29%	53%	—	—	—

2nd Congressional District

Poll source	Date(s) administered	Sample size	Margin of error	Hillary Clinton (D)	Donald Trump (R)	Gary Johnson (L)	Other	Undecided
Emerson College	September 25–27, 2016	233		40%	49%	—	—	—
The Singularis Group, LLC	May 11–12, 2016	1,007	± 3.08%	36%	44%	—	—	20%

3rd Congressional District

Poll source	Date(s) administered	Sample size	Margin of error	Hillary Clinton (D)	Donald Trump (R)	Gary Johnson (L)	Other	Undecided
Emerson College	September 25–27, 2016	234		20%	65%	—	—	—

=== Predictions ===
Source	Ranking	As of
Los Angeles Times	Safe R	November 6, 2016
CNN	Safe R	November 8, 2016
Rothenberg Political Report	Likely R	November 7, 2016
Sabato's Crystal Ball	Safe R	November 7, 2016
NBC	Likely R	November 7, 2016
RealClearPolitics	Safe R	November 8, 2016
Fox News	Safe R	November 7, 2016
ABC	Safe R	November 7, 2016

Source	1st district	2nd district	3rd district	As of
CNN	Safe R	Tossup	Safe R	November 8, 2016
Sabato's Crystal Ball	Safe R	Lean R	Safe R	November 7, 2016
NBC	Safe R	Tossup	Safe R	November 7, 2016
RealClearPolitics	Safe R	Likely R	Safe R	November 8, 2016

=== Results ===
2016 United States presidential election in Nebraska
Party	Candidate	Running mate	Votes	Percentage	Electoral votes
Republican	Donald Trump	Mike Pence	495,961	58.75%	5
Democratic	Hillary Clinton	Tim Kaine	284,494	33.70%	0
Libertarian	Gary Johnson	William Weld	38,946	4.61%	0
Write-Ins			16,051	1.90%	0
Green	Jill Stein	Ajamu Baraka	8,775	1.04%	0
Totals			844,227	100.00%	5

==== By county ====
County	Donald Trump Republican		Hillary Clinton Democratic		Various candidates Other parties		Margin		Total
County	#	%	#	%	#	%	#	%	Total
Adams	9,287	68.73%	3,302	24.44%	924	6.83%	5,985	44.29%	13,513
Antelope	2,732	83.27%	383	11.67%	166	5.06%	2,349	71.60%	3,281
Arthur	244	89.38%	17	6.23%	12	4.39%	227	83.15%	273
Banner	357	88.81%	19	4.73%	26	6.46%	338	84.08%	402
Blaine	276	87.07%	30	9.46%	11	3.47%	246	77.61%	317
Boone	2,299	79.14%	414	14.25%	192	6.61%	1,885	64.89%	2,905
Box Butte	3,617	73.46%	965	19.60%	342	6.94%	2,652	53.86%	4,924
Boyd	983	85.03%	128	11.07%	45	3.90%	855	73.96%	1,156
Brown	1,385	86.73%	153	9.58%	59	3.69%	1,232	77.15%	1,597
Buffalo	14,569	68.95%	4,763	22.54%	1,797	8.51%	9,806	46.41%	21,129
Burt	2,367	66.53%	930	26.14%	261	7.33%	1,437	40.39%	3,558
Butler	3,079	77.34%	691	17.36%	211	5.30%	2,388	59.98%	3,981
Cass	8,452	65.35%	3,484	26.94%	997	7.71%	4,968	38.41%	12,933
Cedar	3,532	79.91%	571	12.92%	317	7.17%	2,961	66.99%	4,420
Chase	1,648	86.83%	171	9.01%	79	4.16%	1,477	77.82%	1,898
Cherry	2,623	84.12%	317	10.17%	178	5.71%	2,306	73.95%	3,118
Cheyenne	3,665	77.80%	711	15.09%	335	7.11%	2,954	62.71%	4,711
Clay	2,422	79.02%	477	15.56%	166	5.42%	1,945	63.46%	3,065
Colfax	2,171	67.55%	859	26.73%	184	5.72%	1,312	40.82%	3,214
Cuming	3,122	76.63%	719	17.65%	233	5.72%	2,403	58.98%	4,074
Custer	4,695	83.07%	641	11.34%	316	5.59%	4,054	71.73%	5,652
Dakota	3,616	57.59%	2,314	36.85%	349	5.56%	1,302	20.74%	6,279
Dawes	2,632	71.60%	801	21.79%	243	6.61%	1,831	49.81%	3,676
Dawson	5,984	69.30%	2,136	24.74%	515	5.96%	3,848	44.56%	8,635
Deuel	809	82.22%	120	12.20%	55	5.58%	689	70.02%	984
Dixon	2,041	73.36%	556	19.99%	185	6.65%	1,485	53.37%	2,782
Dodge	9,933	63.96%	4,544	29.26%	1,052	6.78%	5,389	34.70%	15,529
Douglas	108,077	44.95%	113,798	47.33%	18,558	7.72%	-5,721	-2.38%	240,433
Dundy	823	86.36%	89	9.34%	41	4.30%	734	77.02%	953
Fillmore	2,130	72.42%	613	20.84%	198	6.74%	1,517	51.58%	2,941
Franklin	1,347	80.51%	250	14.94%	76	4.55%	1,097	65.57%	1,673
Frontier	1,110	83.58%	161	12.12%	57	4.30%	949	71.46%	1,328
Furnas	1,921	82.09%	304	12.99%	115	4.92%	1,617	69.10%	2,340
Gage	6,380	63.50%	2,935	29.21%	733	7.29%	3,445	34.29%	10,048
Garden	869	80.84%	153	14.23%	53	4.93%	716	66.61%	1,075
Garfield	821	83.78%	121	12.35%	38	3.87%	700	71.43%	980
Gosper	794	78.61%	166	16.44%	50	4.95%	628	62.17%	1,010
Grant	367	90.62%	20	4.94%	18	4.44%	347	85.68%	405
Greeley	912	77.62%	210	17.87%	53	4.51%	702	59.75%	1,175
Hall	14,408	65.31%	6,282	28.48%	1,370	6.21%	8,126	36.83%	22,060
Hamilton	3,783	75.60%	878	17.55%	343	6.85%	2,905	58.05%	5,004
Harlan	1,496	81.66%	254	13.86%	82	4.48%	1,242	67.80%	1,832
Hayes	472	91.83%	30	5.84%	12	2.33%	442	85.99%	514
Hitchcock	1,232	83.92%	161	10.97%	75	5.11%	1,071	72.95%	1,468
Holt	4,354	85.07%	531	10.38%	233	4.55%	3,823	74.69%	5,118
Hooker	355	85.13%	40	9.59%	22	5.28%	315	75.54%	417
Howard	2,284	76.29%	544	18.17%	166	5.54%	1,740	58.12%	2,994
Jefferson	2,399	68.66%	837	23.96%	258	7.38%	1,562	44.70%	3,494
Johnson	1,355	64.86%	563	26.95%	171	8.19%	792	37.91%	2,089
Kearney	2,531	76.79%	550	16.69%	215	6.52%	1,981	60.10%	3,296
Keith	3,235	80.19%	571	14.15%	228	5.66%	2,664	66.04%	4,034
Keya Paha	460	88.63%	40	7.71%	19	3.66%	420	80.92%	519
Kimball	1,330	79.31%	230	13.71%	117	6.98%	1,100	65.60%	1,677
Knox	3,188	77.47%	720	17.50%	207	5.03%	2,468	59.97%	4,115
Lancaster	61,588	45.21%	61,898	45.44%	12,737	9.35%	-310	-0.23%	136,223
Lincoln	12,164	75.41%	2,913	18.06%	1,054	6.53%	9,251	57.35%	16,131
Logan	400	88.30%	32	7.06%	21	4.64%	368	81.24%	453
Loup	323	83.90%	48	12.47%	14	3.63%	275	71.43%	385
Madison	10,628	74.10%	2,711	18.90%	1,004	7.00%	7,917	55.20%	14,343
McPherson	257	89.55%	14	4.88%	16	5.57%	243	84.67%	287
Merrick	2,926	77.24%	602	15.89%	260	6.87%	2,324	61.35%	3,788
Morrill	1,802	81.58%	284	12.86%	123	5.56%	1,518	68.72%	2,209
Nance	1,261	77.79%	281	17.33%	79	4.88%	980	60.46%	1,621
Nemaha	2,116	66.94%	785	24.83%	260	8.23%	1,331	42.11%	3,161
Nuckolls	1,726	78.28%	353	16.01%	126	5.71%	1,373	62.27%	2,205
Otoe	4,860	65.17%	2,025	27.16%	572	7.67%	2,835	38.01%	7,457
Pawnee	974	73.40%	279	21.02%	74	5.58%	695	52.38%	1,327
Perkins	1,217	83.64%	161	11.07%	77	5.29%	1,056	72.57%	1,455
Phelps	3,849	81.98%	572	12.18%	274	5.84%	3,277	69.80%	4,695
Pierce	3,052	84.08%	382	10.52%	196	5.40%	2,670	73.56%	3,630
Platte	10,965	75.97%	2,646	18.33%	822	5.70%	8,319	57.64%	14,433
Polk	2,028	78.54%	413	16.00%	141	5.46%	1,615	62.54%	2,582
Red Willow	4,258	82.28%	645	12.46%	272	5.26%	3,613	69.82%	5,175
Richardson	2,769	72.77%	818	21.50%	218	5.73%	1,951	51.27%	3,805
Rock	687	86.09%	70	8.77%	41	5.14%	617	77.32%	798
Saline	3,004	58.49%	1,733	33.74%	399	7.77%	1,271	24.75%	5,136
Sarpy	45,143	56.02%	28,033	34.79%	7,404	9.19%	17,110	21.23%	80,580
Saunders	7,555	69.57%	2,523	23.23%	782	7.20%	5,032	46.34%	10,860
Scotts Bluff	10,076	70.38%	3,207	22.40%	1,034	7.22%	6,869	47.98%	14,317
Seward	5,454	68.85%	1,875	23.67%	593	7.48%	3,579	45.18%	7,922
Sheridan	2,211	84.78%	287	11.00%	110	4.22%	1,924	73.78%	2,608
Sherman	1,150	73.11%	340	21.61%	83	5.28%	810	51.50%	1,573
Sioux	616	83.70%	81	11.01%	39	5.29%	535	72.69%	736
Stanton	2,187	78.08%	417	14.89%	197	7.03%	1,770	63.19%	2,801
Thayer	2,051	76.25%	499	18.55%	140	5.20%	1,552	57.70%	2,690
Thomas	344	87.53%	30	7.63%	19	4.84%	314	79.90%	393
Thurston	1,043	49.95%	919	44.01%	126	6.04%	124	5.94%	2,088
Valley	1,780	80.73%	339	15.37%	86	3.90%	1,441	65.36%	2,205
Washington	7,424	68.54%	2,623	24.22%	785	7.24%	4,801	44.32%	10,832
Wayne	2,693	71.32%	835	22.11%	248	6.57%	1,858	49.21%	3,776
Webster	1,330	77.87%	306	17.92%	72	4.21%	1,024	59.95%	1,708
Wheeler	377	81.08%	62	13.33%	26	5.59%	315	67.75%	465
York	4,700	73.66%	1,186	18.59%	495	7.75%	3,514	55.07%	6,381
Totals	495,961	58.75%	284,494	33.70%	63,777	7.55%	211,467	25.05%	844,232

Counties that flipped from Democratic to Republican

- Thurston (largest village: Pender)

Counties that flipped from Republican to Democratic

- Douglas (largest city: Omaha)
- Lancaster (largest city: Lincoln)

==== By congressional district ====
Trump won all of the state's three congressional districts, winning all of the state's electoral votes.

District	Trump	Clinton	Representative
1st	56%	35%	Jeff Fortenberry
2nd	47%	45%	Brad Ashford
2nd	47%	45%	Don Bacon
3rd	74%	20%	Adrian Smith

== Analysis ==
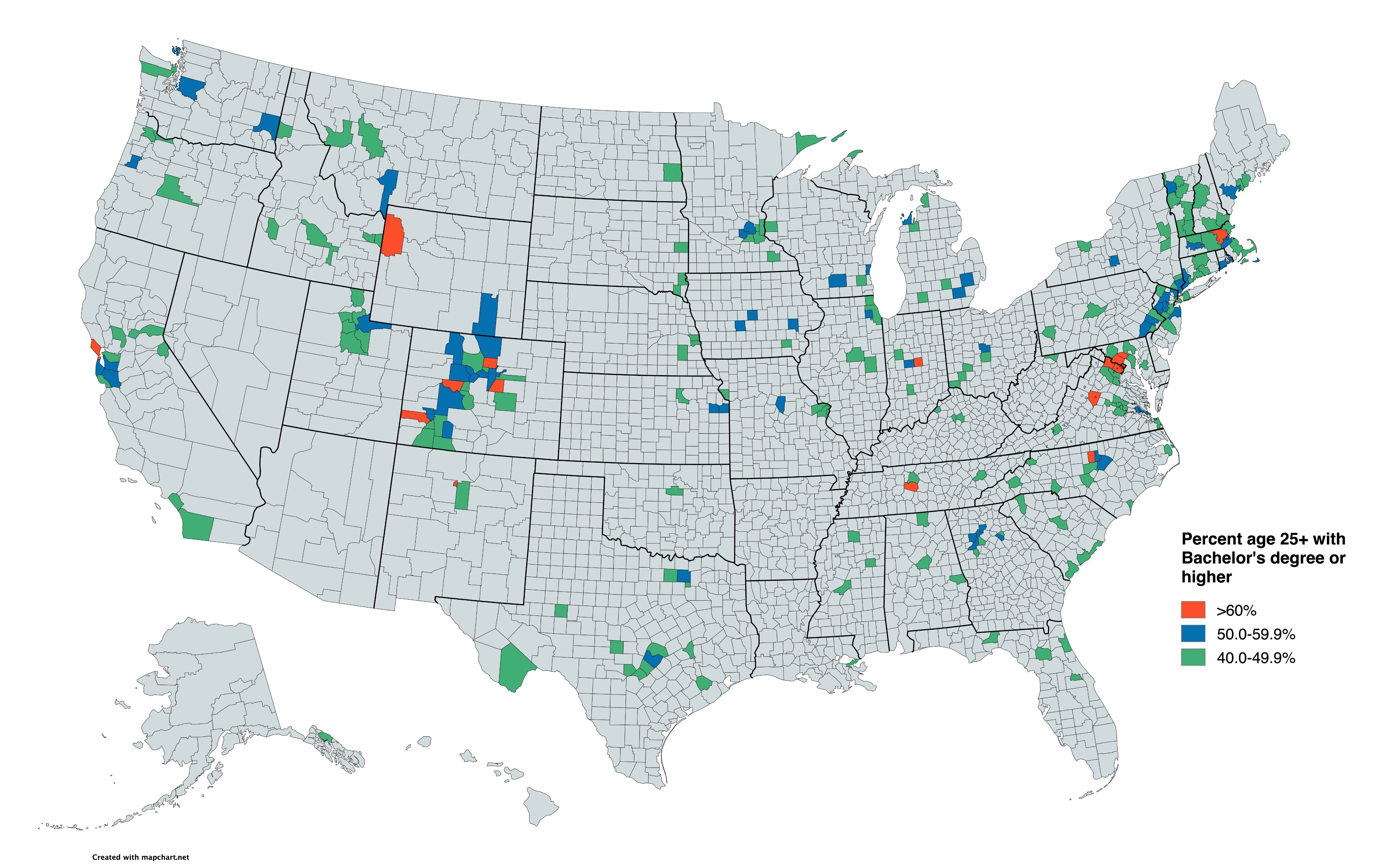
A map of the most college-educated counties in the United States

Although Trump won Nebraska's 2nd congressional district in 2016, the district shifted significantly leftward, and Clinton lost it by just 2%. Trump became the first Republican to win the White House without carrying Douglas or Lancaster County since William Howard Taft in 1908.

This was because Douglas and Lancaster counties, which are in the district, are two of the most highly educated counties in Nebraska. Trump underperformed among white voters with college degrees in 2016. In 2020 and 2024 Democrats won a majority of white voters with college degrees, and were thus able to win the district in those elections.

== See also ==
- United States presidential elections in Nebraska
- First presidency of Donald Trump
- 2016 Democratic Party presidential debates and forums
- 2016 Democratic Party presidential primaries
- 2016 Republican Party presidential debates and forums
- 2016 Republican Party presidential primaries
