= Victor Koman =

American novelist

Victor Koman (born August 9, 1954) is an American science fiction and fantasy writer and agorist. A three-time winner of the Prometheus Award, Koman is mainly popular in the libertarian community. He is the owner of the publishing house KoPubCo. His Ph.D. in Information Technology was conferred by Capella University in 2016. He also possesses a BSIS (with honors, summa cum laude) from University of Redlands (2001) and an MBA from Pepperdine University (2004).

Koman's short stories have appeared in such publications as The Magazine of Fantasy & Science Fiction, Galaxy Science Fiction, and the anthologies Weird Menace, The King is Dead: Tales of Elvis Post-Mortem, the second and third Dark Destiny collections set in the White Wolf World of Darkness, and the libertarian short-story collection Free Space.

In the early 1980s, Koman collaborated with Andrew J. Offutt on Offutt's Spaceways series for Playboy Press (which was sold to Berkley Books in mid-stride). Koman wrote two novels in the series, to which Offutt added his own scenes, then edited and published the novels under the series name "John Cleve". These paperbacks are long out of print. Covers for both novels were painted by Ken Barr.

A community activist, Koman was instrumental in preventing the 1988 destruction of the Disneyland Monorail System's last bubble-topped Mark III monorail (Old Red), generating a one-man public-relations campaign that resulted in nationwide news coverage. The Walt Disney Company subsequently saved, restored, and converted the historic monorail fuselage into a street-legal promotional vehicle.

Koman's 1995 story collaboration with Brad Linaweaver, "The Light That Blinds", features an occult battle between Aleister Crowley and Adolf Hitler.

Koman has appeared as an extra in several films, including Star Trek: The Motion Picture, CyberZone, Rapid Assault, Fugitive Rage, Mom’s Outta Sight, Billy Frankenstein, KidWitch (in which his daughter, Vanessa Koman, played the title role), Red Dragon, The Hot Chick, and A-List (film). On November 15, 1998, he was the winner on the game show Inquizition.

Koman has made available the body of work of Samuel Edward Konkin III through KoPubCo. He is the pseudonymous author of the Gloamingerism pamphlets published as afterwords in the 1999 trade paperback edition of J. Neil Schulman's novel Alongside Night.

== Selected bibliography ==
- Starship Women (1980)
- Spaceways #13: Jonuta Rising! (1983)
- Spaceways #17: The Carnadyne Horde (1984)
- The Jehovah Contract (1987)
- Solomon's Knife (1989)
- Kings of the High Frontier (1996)
- Millennium: Weeds (1997)
- Death's Dimensions: A Psychotic Space Opera (1999)
- Captain Anger Adventure#1: The Microbotic Menace (1999)
