= Counter-economics =

Economic theory and method

Counter-economics is an economic theory and revolutionary method consisting of direct action carried out through the black market or the gray market. As a term, it was originally used by American libertarian activists and theorists Samuel Edward Konkin III and J. Neil Schulman. The former defined it as the study or practice "of all peaceful human action which is forbidden by the State".

The term is short for counter-establishment economics and may also be referred to as counter-politics. Counter-economics was integrated by Schulman into Konkin's doctrine of agorism, a left-libertarian social philosophy and branch of market anarchism that advocates creating a society in which all relations between people are voluntary exchanges.

Within libertarianism in the United States, counter-economics has been adopted by anarcho-capitalists, left-wing market anarchists, as well as more anti-capitalist anarchists.

== Origins ==
The first presentation of the theory of counter-economics was made by Samuel Edward Konkin III at a conference organized by J. Neil Schulman in 1974 held in Cheshire, Massachusetts. The first book to portray counter-economics as a strategy for achieving a libertarian society was Schulman's novel Alongside Night (1979).

== Relationship with agorism ==
Konkin's agorism, as exposited in his New Libertarian Manifesto, postulates that the correct method of achieving a voluntary society is through advocacy and growth of the underground economy or "black market" – the "counter-economy" as Konkin put it – until such a point that the State's perceived moral authority and outright power have been so thoroughly undermined that revolutionary market anarchist legal and security enterprises are able to arise from underground and ultimately suppress government as a criminal activity (with taxation being treated as theft, war being treated as mass murder, et cetera).

According to Konkin's pamphlet Counter-Economics:

The Counter-Economy is the sum of all non-aggressive Human Action which is forbidden by the State. Counter-economics is the study of the Counter-Economy and its practices. The Counter-Economy includes the free market, the Black Market, the "underground economy," all acts of civil and social disobedience, all acts of forbidden association (sexual, racial, cross-religious), and anything else the State, at any place or time, chooses to prohibit, control, regulate, tax, or tariff. The Counter-Economy excludes all State-approved action (the "White Market") and the Red Market (violence and theft not approved by the State).

According to Konkin, counter-economics also allows for immediate self-liberation from statist controls, to whatever degree practical, by applying entrepreneurial logic to rationally decide which laws to discreetly break and when. The fundamental principle is to trade risk for profit, although profit can refer to any gain in perceived value rather than strictly monetary gains (as a consequence of the subjective theory of value).

Voluntary practices of counter-economics include:

- Bartering and alternative currency use
- Illegal migration or hiring illegal immigrants
- Drug trafficking
- Exchange of food stamps
- Mutual credit
- Smuggling
- Subsistence farming
- Tax evasion
- Prostitution

== Strategy ==
According to Per Bylund, counter-economics applies two basic strategies to liberate people from the state, vertical or introverted and horizontal or extroverted, arguing:

The first recipe provides instructions for how to break free vertically through building a decentralized infrastructure for free communities avoiding the State and its centralized "solutions" altogether. The other recipe advocates breaking free horizontally through making use of one's personal network of friends and colleagues, and doing business out of the State's reach. One might also call these recipes or strategies the introvert and extrovert solutions to our methodological problem.

=== Vertical or introverted ===
The vertical or introverted strategy is aimed towards individuals concentrating on decentralized local infrastructure as opposed to expansive state foundations and explained as such:

What this means in real terms is to create local or neighborhood networks for self-reliance, where people in the vicinity get together to find ways to produce whatever is necessary for survival and a good life. It means creating local production facilities and markets with no effective State regulations and without the State's knowledge.

Voluntary association among those in a community is essential to this concept. Bylund believes developing means to refuse dependency on state services and become self-reliant can be an effective course of action to achieve free market processes. Community technology is an example of this strategy. Bylund mentions Karl Hess's efforts to transform a Washington, D.C. neighborhood which reflects these principles as a primary example. Hess set up green houses on top of available rooftops and using old washing machine parts to build a fish-breeding facility in a building basement.

=== Horizontal or extroverted ===
The horizontal or extroverted strategy applies individuals actively creating black market networks and structures which can be stretched beyond neighborhood communities focus in the vertical strategy, with Bylund arguing as follows:

What it basically proposes is to trade with people you know and people who are recommended to you. This can all be done at whatever scale one finds appropriate, using available technology such as the Internet and e.g. eBay for communication and money transactions. A first step could be to hire the children next-door to mow the lawn or baby-sit. It does not have to be very sophisticated at first. This approach should come naturally to libertarians, since it simply means exercising trade without bothering with State regulations or paying taxes. Most people are willing to exchange goods and services without registering the sales tax, which is a good start. Some of them will also find it in their interest to do this on a larger scale, producing and distributing goods and services without ever paying taxes or following unnecessary government regulations and controls. And most people don't really care about government standards if they trust their supplier.

== See also ==
- Civil disobedience
- Illegalism
- Informal sector
- The Other Path: The Economic Answer to Terrorism
