= 2016 Libertarian National Convention =

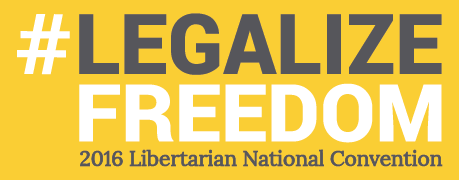
- 2016 presidential election

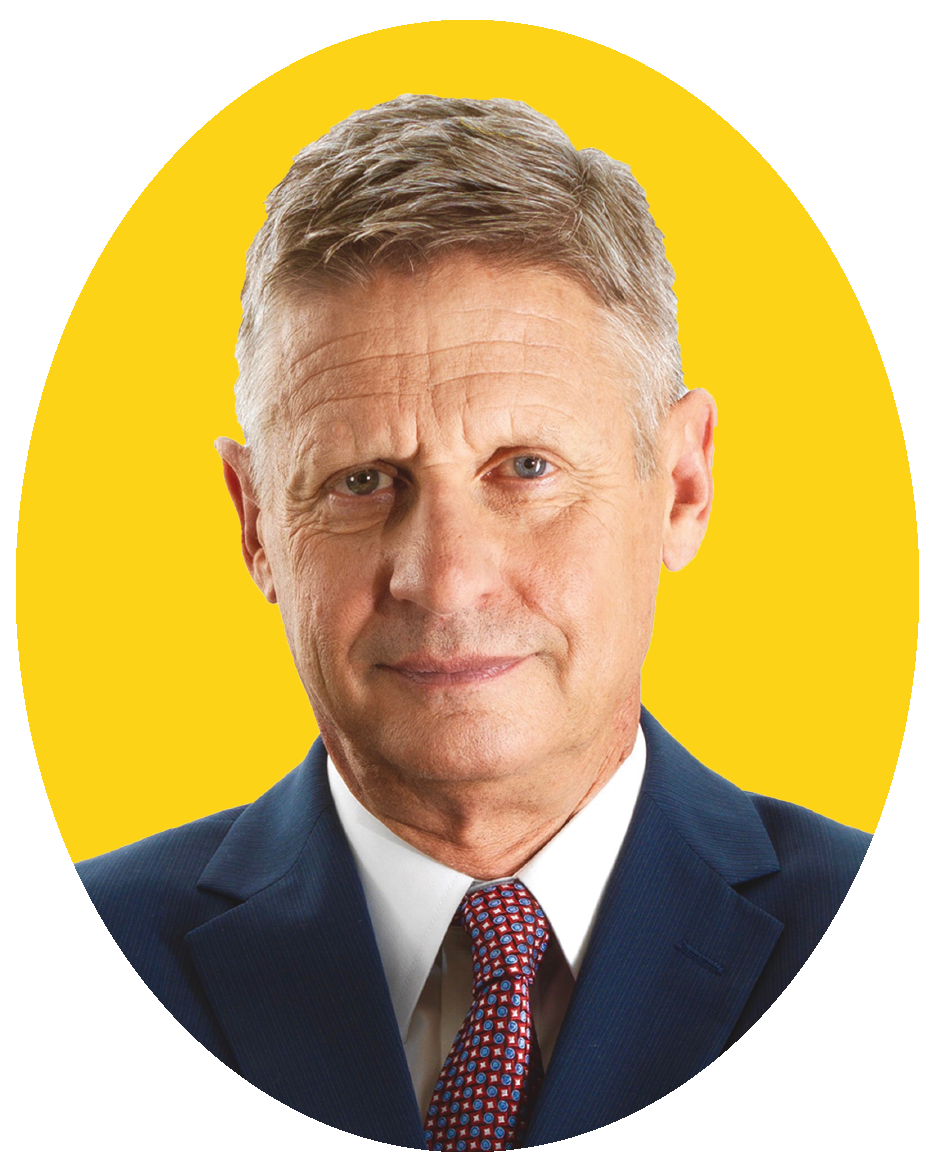
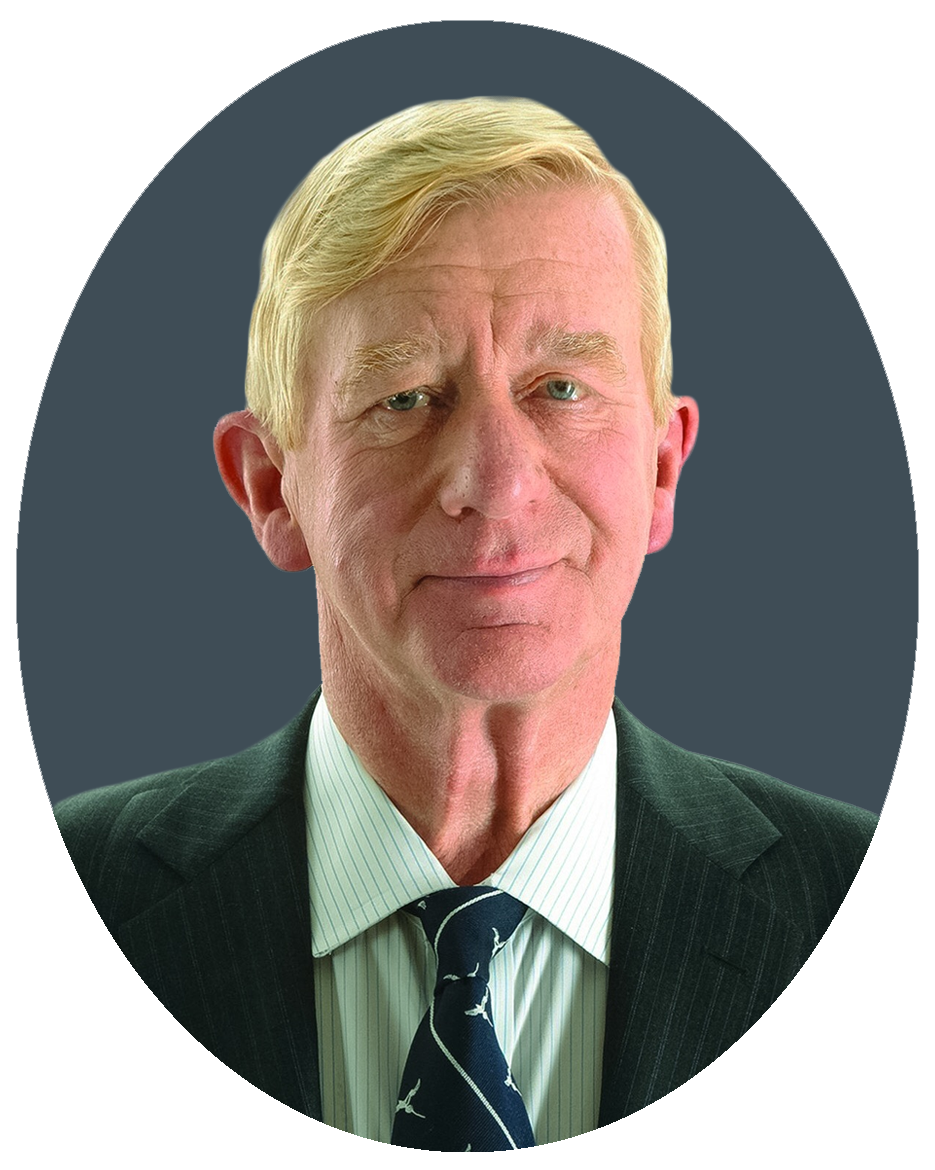
- Nominees; Johnson and Weld

Convention
- Dates: May 26–30, 2016
- City: Orlando, Florida, United States
- Venue: Rosen Centre Hotel & Resort
- Keynote speaker: Ruth Bennett

Candidates
- Presidential nominee: Gary Johnson of New Mexico
- Vice-presidential nominee: Bill Weld of Massachusetts
- Other candidates: Austin Petersen of Missouri; John McAfee of Tennessee; Darryl W. Perry of New Hampshire

Voting
- Total delegates: 911 delegates 76 alternates 928 votes
- Votes needed for nomination: 464 (Majority)
- Results (president): Johnson (NM): 518 (55.8%); Petersen (MO): 203 (21.8%); McAfee (VA): 131 (14.1%); Perry (NH): 52 (5.6%); Feldman (OH): 18 (1.9%); Other candidates (including NOTA): 6 (0.6%)
- Ballots: President: 2 Ballots; Vice President: 2 Ballots

The 2016 Libertarian National Convention was the gathering at which delegates of the Libertarian Party chose the party's nominees for president and vice president in the 2016 national election. The party selected Gary Johnson, a former Governor of New Mexico, as its presidential candidate, with Bill Weld, a former Governor of Massachusetts as his running mate. The convention was held from May 26–30, 2016, in Orlando, Florida.

== Theme ==
The theme of the 2016 convention was #LegalizeFreedom.

== Events ==
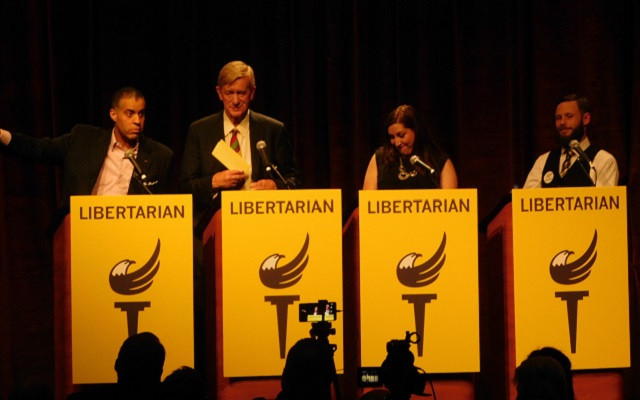
VP debate

Sites of the 2016 national presidential nominating conventions. Blue, red, green, and yellow indicate the conventions for the Democratic, Republican, Green, and Libertarian parties, respectively.
- May 26 – The presidential candidates Marc Allan Feldman, Gary Johnson, John McAfee, Darryl W. Perry, and Austin Petersen participated in a political debate at the convention.
- May 27 – A debate between the Libertarian candidates seeking the vice presidential nomination was held. On the same day, the candidates for chairperson of the LNC debated.
- May 28 – A debate between the Libertarian presidential candidates was held. The debate was televised live by C-SPAN. It was moderated by Larry Elder.
- May 29 – The vote and nomination of the Libertarian presidential and vice-presidential candidates was held and televised by C-SPAN. Multiple ballots extended this.
  - In addition to the announcement of the Party's presidential ticket, a chairperson for the LNC was elected at the convention. Incumbent chairman of the Libertarian National Committee, Nicholas Sarwark was re-elected to the position.

== Presidential delegate count ==
Libertarian National Convention Presidential vote, 2016 – 1st Ballot
| Candidate | First Ballot | Percentage |
|---|---|---|
| Gary Johnson | 458 | 49.5% |
| Austin Petersen | 197 | 21.3% |
| John McAfee | 131 | 14.2% |
| Darryl Perry | 63 | 6.8% |
| Marc Allan Feldman | 58 | 6.3% |
| Kevin McCormick | 9 | 1.0% |
| None of the above | 5 | 0.5% |
| Ron Paul (Write-in) | 1 | 0.1% |
| Vermin Supreme (Write-in) | 1 | 0.1% |
| Heidi Zemen (Write-in) | 1 | 0.1% |
| Derrick Grayson (Write-in) | 1 | 0.1% |
| Totals | 925 | 100% |

No candidate achieved the majority on the first ballot, so there was a second ballot vote. Due to finishing last of the six nominated candidates, McCormick was excluded from the second ballot.

Libertarian National Convention Presidential vote, 2016 – 2nd Ballot
| Candidate | Second Ballot | Percentage |
|---|---|---|
| Gary Johnson | 518 | 55.8% |
| Austin Petersen | 203 | 21.9% |
| John McAfee | 131 | 14.1% |
| Darryl Perry | 52 | 5.6% |
| Marc Allan Feldman | 18 | 1.9% |
| None of the above | 2 | 0.2% |
| Derrick Grayson (Write-in) | 1 | 0.1% |
| Michael Shannon (Write-in) | 1 | 0.1% |
| Kevin McCormick (Write-in) | 1 | 0.1% |
| Rhett Smith (Write-in) | 1 | 0.1% |
| Totals | 928 | 100% |

=== State by state delegate count ===
First place by delegate votes. Gary Johnson (36) Austin Petersen (9) No vote (1) John McAfee (3) Tie (4)

Libertarian National Convention Presidential vote, 2016 – 1st Ballot
| State / District | Candidate | | | | | | | Write-in | | | | Abstentions |
| State / District | Marc Allan Feldman | Gary Johnson | John McAfee | Kevin McCormick | Darryl W. Perry | Austin Petersen | N.O.T.A. | Derrick Grayson | Ron Paul | Vermin Supreme | Heidi Zemen | Abstentions |
|---|---|---|---|---|---|---|---|---|---|---|---|---|
| Alabama | | 7 | 3 | | 2 | 1 | | | | | | |
| Alaska | 1 | | | | | 5 | | | | | | |
| Arizona | 2 | 11 | 7 | 2 | 2 | 2 | | | | | | |
| Arkansas | 1 | 4 | 3 | | | | 1 | | | | | |
| California | 4 | 48 | 21 | 3 | 4 | 33 | | | | 1 | 1 | |
| Colorado | | 17 | 1 | | 2 | 2 | | 1 | | | | |
| Connecticut | | 3 | 3 | | | 4 | | | | | | |
| Delaware | | 1 | | 1 | | 1 | | | | | | |
| District of Columbia | | 3 | | | | | | | | | | |
| Florida | 4 | 28 | 3 | | 5 | 13 | | | | | | |
| Georgia | 5 | 9 | 8 | | 4 | 5 | | | | | | |
| Hawaii | | 4 | | | | 1 | | | | | | |
| Idaho | | 6 | | | | 1 | | | | | | |
| Illinois | | 19 | 3 | | 1 | 4 | | | | | | |
| Indiana | 1 | 18 | 4 | | 2 | 9 | | | | | | |
| Iowa | 2 | 3 | 1 | 1 | | 3 | | | | | | |
| Kansas | | 2 | | | 1 | 2 | | | | | | |
| Kentucky | 1 | 7 | 3 | | | | | | | | | |
| Louisiana | | 4 | | | | 8 | 1 | | | | | |
| Maine | | 2 | | | | 5 | | | | | | |
| Maryland | 4 | 10 | | | 2 | 2 | | | | | | |
| Massachusetts | | 8 | 3 | | | | | | | | | |
| Michigan | 2 | 15 | 5 | | 1 | 1 | 1 | | | | | |
| Minnesota | | 5 | | | 2 | 2 | | | | | | |
| Mississippi | | 6 | 1 | | | 1 | | | | | | |
| Missouri | 1 | 7 | 1 | 1 | 1 | 12 | 1 | | | | | |
| Montana | 1 | 1 | 2 | | 1 | 2 | | | | | | |
| Nebraska | | 2 | | | | 6 | | | | | | |
| Nevada | | 11 | | | | 1 | 1 | | | | | |
| New Hampshire | | 1 | 2 | | 5 | 1 | | | | | | |
| New Jersey | 2 | 9 | 5 | | 2 | 3 | | | | | | |
| New Mexico | | 11 | | | 2 | | | | | | | |
| New York | 1 | 16 | 3 | | 3 | 16 | | | | | | |
| North Carolina | 4 | 18 | 2 | 1 | 1 | 3 | | | | | | |
| North Dakota | | 1 | 2 | | | 2 | | | | | | |
| Ohio | 8 | 21 | 3 | | | 9 | | | | | | |
| Oklahoma | 1 | 2 | 1 | | 1 | 1 | | | | | | |
| Oregon | | | | | | | | | | | | |
| Pennsylvania | 3 | 16 | 4 | | 12 | 6 | | | | | | 1 |
| Rhode Island | | 3 | | | | | | | | | | |
| South Carolina | | 9 | | | | 4 | | | | | | |
| South Dakota | | 1 | | | | | | | | | | |
| Tennessee | | 14 | 3 | | 1 | | | | | | | |
| Texas | 7 | 26 | 15 | | 2 | 10 | | | | | | |
| Utah | 1 | 2 | 2 | | | 2 | | | 1 | | | |
| Vermont | | | 3 | | | | | | | | | |
| Virginia | 1 | 19 | 2 | | 2 | 6 | | | | | | 1 |
| Washington | 1 | 13 | 10 | | | 3 | | | | | | |
| West Virginia | | | | | | 5 | | | | | | |
| Wisconsin | | 13 | 2 | | 1 | | | | | | | |
| Wyoming | | 2 | | | 1 | | | | | | | |
| Totals | 58 | 458 | 131 | 9 | 63 | 197 | 5 | 1 | 1 | 1 | 1 | 2 |
| Percentages | 6.3% | 49.5% | 14.2% | 1.0% | 6.8% | 21.3% | 0.5% | 0.1% | 0.1% | 0.1% | 0.1% | —N/a |

No candidate achieved the majority on the first ballot, so there was a second ballot vote. Due to receiving less than 5% of the votes, McCormick was excluded from the second ballot.

Libertarian National Convention Presidential vote, 2016 – 2nd Ballot
| State / District | Candidate | | | | | | Write-in | | | |
| State / District | Marc Allan Feldman | Gary Johnson | John McAfee | Darryl W. Perry | Austin Petersen | N.O.T.A. | Derrick Grayson | Kevin McCormick | Michael Shannon | Rhett Smith |
|---|---|---|---|---|---|---|---|---|---|---|
| Alabama | | 9 | 2 | 1 | 1 | | | | | |
| Alaska | 1 | | | | 5 | | | | | |
| Arizona | | 11 | 8 | 2 | 3 | 1 | | | | |
| Arkansas | | 5 | 4 | | | | | | | |
| California | 1 | 56 | 25 | 2 | 33 | | | | | |
| Colorado | 1 | 17 | 1 | 3 | 1 | | 1 | | | |
| Connecticut | | 4 | | 1 | 4 | | | 1 | | |
| Delaware | | 1 | | | 2 | | | | | |
| District of Columbia | | 3 | | | | | | | | |
| Florida | 2 | 31 | 5 | 3 | 12 | | | | | |
| Georgia | 1 | 10 | 10 | 2 | 8 | | | | | |
| Hawaii | | 4 | | | 1 | | | | | |
| Idaho | | 6 | | | 1 | | | | | |
| Illinois | | 19 | 3 | 1 | 4 | | | | | |
| Indiana | 1 | 24 | 1 | | 8 | | | | | |
| Iowa | | 4 | 2 | | 5 | | | | | |
| Kansas | | 2 | | | 4 | | | | | |
| Kentucky | | 8 | 3 | | | | | | | |
| Louisiana | | 4 | | 1 | 8 | | | | | |
| Maine | | 2 | | | 5 | | | | | |
| Maryland | 2 | 10 | 1 | 2 | | | | | | |
| Massachusetts | | 8 | 3 | | | | | | | |
| Michigan | 1 | 16 | 4 | 2 | 1 | 1 | | | | |
| Minnesota | | 8 | | 1 | 1 | | | | | |
| Mississippi | | 6 | 1 | | 1 | | | | | |
| Missouri | | 10 | | 1 | 13 | | | | | |
| Montana | | 2 | 3 | | 2 | | | | | |
| Nebraska | | 2 | | | 5 | | | | 1 | |
| Nevada | | 11 | | | 2 | | | | | |
| New Hampshire | | 2 | 4 | 3 | 1 | | | | | |
| New Jersey | 1 | 11 | 4 | 2 | 3 | | | | | |
| New Mexico | | 12 | | | 1 | | | | | |
| New York | | 20 | 1 | 3 | 15 | | | | | |
| North Carolina | 1 | 19 | 3 | 1 | 5 | | | | | |
| North Dakota | | 2 | 2 | | 1 | | | | | |
| Ohio | 3 | 21 | 7 | | 9 | | | | | |
| Oklahoma | | 3 | | | 3 | | | | | |
| Oregon | | | | | | | | | | |
| Pennsylvania | | 18 | 4 | 12 | 7 | | | | | |
| Rhode Island | | 3 | | | | | | | | |
| South Carolina | | 8 | | 1 | 4 | | | | | |
| South Dakota | | 1 | | | | | | | | |
| Tennessee | | 14 | 3 | 1 | | | | | | |
| Texas | 2 | 34 | 12 | 3 | 8 | | | | | 1 |
| Utah | | 5 | | | 3 | | | | | |
| Vermont | | | 3 | | | | | | | |
| Virginia | | 21 | 2 | 2 | 5 | | | | | |
| Washington | 1 | 13 | 10 | | 3 | | | | | |
| West Virginia | | 1 | | | 4 | | | | | |
| Wisconsin | | 15 | | 1 | | | | | | |
| Wyoming | | 2 | | 1 | | | | | | |
| Totals | 18 | 518 | 131 | 52 | 203 | 2 | 1 | 1 | 1 | 1 |
| Percentages | 1.9% | 55.8% | 14.1% | 5.6% | 21.9% | 0.2% | 0.1% | 0.1% | 0.1% | 0.1% |

== Vice-presidential delegate count ==
Prior to vice presidential balloting, Marc Allan Feldman endorsed Gary Johnson's running mate Bill Weld, and Austin Petersen endorsed Alicia Dearn. Judd Weiss, whom John McAfee had selected as his running mate, withdrew his name from consideration and endorsed William Coley, who had been Darryl Perry's running mate. Consequently, McAfee endorsed Derrick Grayson, who received a write-in vote in each round of the presidential contest but had not campaigned for either the presidency or vice presidency prior to the convention.

Libertarian National Convention Vice Presidential vote, 2016 – 1st Ballot
| Candidate | First Ballot | Percentage |
|---|---|---|
| Bill Weld | 426 | 49.0% |
| Larry Sharpe | 264 | 30.4% |
| William Coley | 93 | 10.7% |
| Derrick Grayson | 48 | 5.5% |
| Alicia Dearn | 29 | 3.3% |
| None of the above | 6 | 0.7% |
| Daniel Hogan (Write-in) | 1 | 0.1% |
| Austin Petersen (Write-in) | 1 | 0.1% |
| Gary Johnson (Write-in) | 1 | 0.1% |
| Totals | 869 | 100% |

No candidate achieved the majority on the first ballot, so there was a second ballot vote. Due to finishing last of the five nominated candidates, Dearn was excluded from the second ballot. Dearn then endorsed Weld. Additionally, both Coley and Grayson withdrew their names and endorsed Sharpe. However, Grayson withdrew his candidacy after the second ballots had been handed out, and therefore his name remained on the ballot as a valid candidate.

Libertarian National Convention Vice Presidential vote, 2016 – 2nd Ballot
| Candidate | Second Ballot | Percentage |
|---|---|---|
| Bill Weld | 441 | 50.6% |
| Larry Sharpe | 409 | 46.9% |
| None of the above | 12 | 1.4% |
| Derrick Grayson | 9 | 1.0% |
| Mary Ruwart (Write-in) | 1 | 0.1% |
| Totals | 872 | 100% |

== Speakers ==
Notable speakers included:

- Craig Bowden, 2016 candidate for the U.S. House of Representatives from Utah's 1st congressional district
- William Coley, 2016 Libertarian vice presidential candidate
- Judge Jim Gray, 2012 Libertarian Vice Presidential nominee
- Larry Elder, lawyer, writer and radio and television personality who calls himself the "Sage of South Central," a district of Los Angeles, California
- Bruce Fein, lawyer specializing in constitutional and international law
- Sharon Harris, libertarian political activist and president of the Advocates for Self-Government, author
- Carla Howell, political activist and small government advocate
- Adam Kokesh, Iraq War veteran, anti-war and libertarian activist, and author
- Tim Moen, Leader of the Libertarian Party of Canada since May 2014, firefighter, paramedic, business owner, filmmaker, and volunteer
- John Moore, former member of the Nevada Assembly representing District 8, realtor
- Jordan Page, singer-songwriter and musician
- Jim Rogers, Chairman of Rogers Holdings and Beeland Interests, Inc., Co-founder of the Quantum Fund, businessman, investor and author
- Jeffrey Tucker, economics writer of the Austrian School, advocate of anarcho-capitalism and Bitcoin, publisher of libertarian books, conference speaker, and internet entrepreneur
- Dr. Thomas Woods, historian, author, and senior fellow of the Mises Institute

== James Weeks' dance and expulsion ==
On May 29, candidate for chairman of the LNC James Weeks took stage and stripped down to a thong, saying "I thought we could use a little bit of fun." He danced on the stage before announcing the suspension of his bid for chairperson. He was booed loudly by the delegates and removed from the convention. The incident was streamed live on C-SPAN. This took place during the tabulation of votes on the second ballot for vice president, and many delegates attempted to make a motion to expel Weeks from the party. This was cut short when chairman Nicholas Sarwark moved to set the matter aside and announce the results of the vice presidential nomination. Weeks was later expelled from the Libertarian Party of Michigan, which disavowed all support for his candidacy for county Sheriff.

== See also ==
- Libertarian National Convention
- Libertarian Party presidential debates and forums, 2016
- Libertarian Party presidential primaries, 2016
- United States Libertarian Party
- Other U.S. political parties' presidential nominating conventions of 2016:
  - Constitution Party National Convention
  - Democratic National Convention
  - Green National Convention
  - Republican National Convention
- 2016 United States presidential election
