= Kings of the High Frontier =

1996 novel by Victor Koman

- Cover of the 1998 hardcover edition
- Author: Victor Koman
- Cover artist: Rob Prior
- Language: English
- Subject: NASA, civilian exploration of space
- Genre: Hard science fiction
- Publisher: Pulpless.com, then Bereshith Publishing, then KoPubCo
- Publication date: June 1996 (ebook); October 1998 (hardcover); November 2017 (ebook)
- Publication place: United States of America
- Media type: ebook, hardcover
- Pages: 576
- ISBN: 0-9665662-5-4 (slipcased); ISBN 0-9665662-0-3 (hardcover)

Kings of the High Frontier is a hard science fiction novel by American writer Victor Koman, first published (electronically) in 1996.

== Summary ==
The story is a polemic about NASA. The thesis is that NASA, far from helping space exploration, actually prevents it from going forth. The narrative follows disparate engineering efforts, ranging from New York University engineering students working out of a warehouse in the Bronx to full-fledged commercial rocket operations, to create a single-stage to orbit reusable launch vehicle.

All of the science and equipment used in the story was based on technology that existed at the time of writing, like the space activity suit.

== Editions ==
The novel was first published electronically by J. Neil Schulman's pulpless.com in 1996. It has since been published in hardcover by Bereshith Publishing in 1998, first in a "deluxe edition" of 250, then as a regular hardcover in a small print-run of 1250 copies. As of 2016, there is no paperback edition. KoPubCo released an ebook edition in 2017, with significant changes by the author.
