= Austin Petersen =

American writer, political activist, and producer (born 1981)

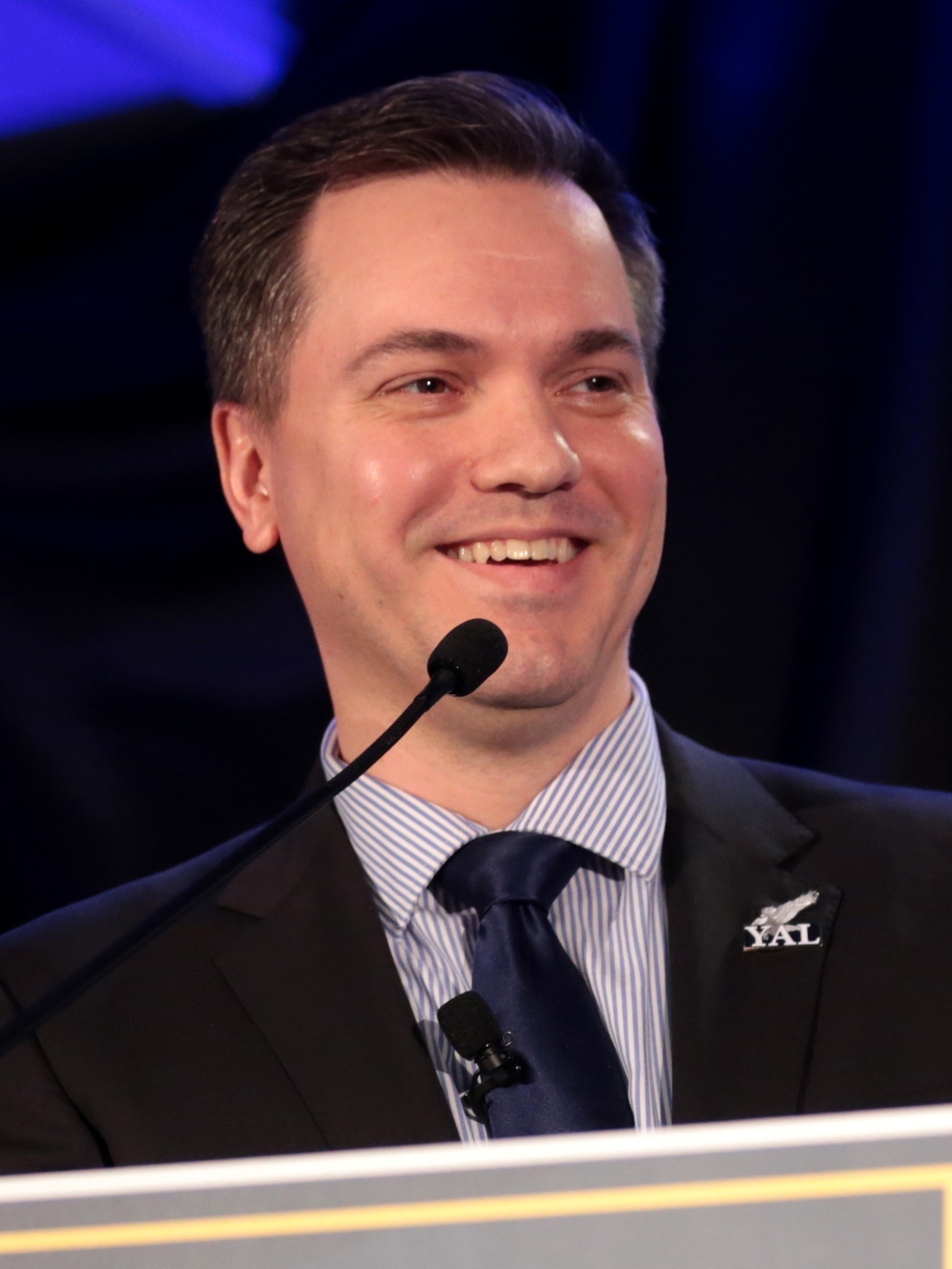
- Petersen in 2018
- Born: Austin Wade Petersen; February 19, 1981 (age 45); Independence, Missouri, U.S.
- Education: Southwest Missouri State University
- Occupations: Political activist, radio show host, writer, publisher, political commentator, film and television producer
- Political party: Libertarian (before 2017); Republican (2017–present)
- Spouse: Stephanie Cole (m. 2021)
- Website: Official website

Austin Wade Petersen (born February 19, 1981) is an American nonfiction writer, politician, activist, commentator, and broadcaster. He is the host of the Wake Up America show daily newscast. He was the runner-up for the Libertarian Party's nomination for President of the United States in 2016, finishing second place to Gary Johnson with 21.9% of the vote.

On August 7, 2018, he finished third in the U.S. Senate Republican primary in Missouri with 8.3% of the vote, behind winner Josh Hawley and runner-up Tony Monetti.

== Early life and education ==
Petersen was raised on a farm in Peculiar, Missouri, the son of Donna and John D. Petersen. He attended Southwest Missouri State University, where he graduated with a degree in musical theater.

== Career ==
=== Early work ===
Petersen's early career included stints as a model and as a product demonstrator at FAO Schwarz; at the latter position, he briefly appeared during a Late Night with Conan O'Brien sketch filmed at the store.

In 2008 Petersen worked for the Libertarian National Committee and the Atlas Network, assisting on the 2008 and 2012 presidential bids of former U.S. Representative from Texas, Ron Paul. He was an associate producer at the Fox Business program Freedom Watch with Judge Napolitano, which aired from 2010 to 2012, and later went to work as director of production at the conservative advocacy group FreedomWorks. Petersen has also been a frequent guest on the RT program The Big Picture with Thom Hartmann.

Petersen served as an executive producer of the 2014 film Alongside Night, an adaptation of the novel of the same name which promoted agorism, an anarcho-capitalist political philosophy. Several prominent Libertarian figures, such as Ron Paul and Adam Kokesh, appeared in the film.

=== Post 2016-activities ===
As of 2018, Petersen was the owner and CEO of a photo and video consulting firm called Stonegait LLC and is the founder of The Libertarian Republic and Liberty Viral – both libertarian news and commentary websites. He ran for the United States Senate as a Republican in 2018, but was defeated in the primary by Missouri's Attorney General Josh Hawley. In 2019, Austin Petersen took over as the host of the KWOS Morning Show on Jefferson City but stepped down to host the Wake Up America show in September 2022.

== 2016 presidential campaign ==
By 2015, Petersen was living in Kansas City, Missouri, "behind a midtown QuikTrip" when he announced his candidacy in the 2016 Libertarian Party nominating convention for President of the United States. Writing in the Los Angeles Times, he was described by Reason editor Matt Welch as "an eager libertarian dudebro on the make".

Petersen called himself the Bernie Sanders of the Libertarian Party due to his grassroots fundraising strategy. After Ted Cruz terminated his campaign for the Republican Party's nomination for president, Petersen received the backing of Mary Matalin and Erick Erickson. In many polls, he placed in the top three presidential choices for his party, along with opponents John McAfee and Gary Johnson. On May 29, 2016, at the Libertarian National Convention, Petersen lost the nomination to Johnson, getting second place on the second ballot. Petersen congratulated Johnson on the win and gave him a replica of George Washington's pistol. Petersen then criticized Johnson's vice presidential pick Bill Weld, in response to which Johnson placed the replica into a garbage can.

Petersen, thereafter, endorsed Johnson for president.

== 2018 Senate campaign ==
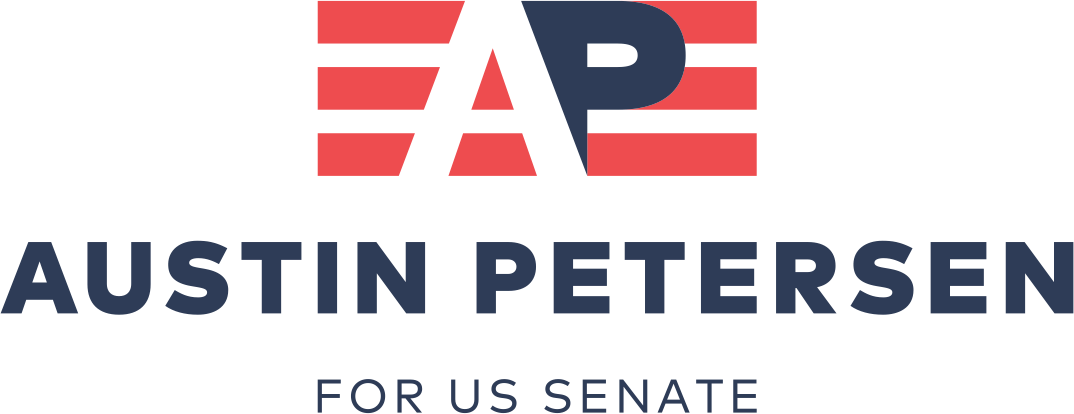
Campaign logo

In late June 2017, Petersen filed an exploratory committee to consider running for the U.S. Senate seat in Missouri. On July 4, 2017, Petersen formally announced his bid for the Republican nomination in the 2018 Missouri Senate race.

In September 2017, Petersen was banned from Facebook during his senate campaign for giving away an AR-15 style rifle as a promotion and criticizing his Democratic opponent Claire McCaskill's positions on gun rights. The ban was lifted after Fox News and the New York Post reported that Facebook's COO Sheryl Sandberg had made max donations to McCaskill's campaign. The raffle drew renewed controversy in February 2018 when the school shooting in Parkland, Florida caused the Springfield News-Leader to investigate. KMOV in St. Louis scrutinized Petersen over his views on gun control in light of the shooting.

Petersen also reportedly received the national record for the largest Bitcoin donation in American campaign history. Fox News reported in January 2018 that Petersen was one of two "potential general election challengers" in the election.

Petersen officially filed with the Missouri Secretary of State for the US Senate seat as a Republican on February 28, 2018.

On March 6, Petersen announced a new AR-15 raffle on Facebook. His personal page was banned after the livestream was recorded. In July he announced a raffle for a machine, similar to a 3D printer, that can produce "untraceable gun parts". His campaign said 3D printing technology has been described as the "end of gun control".

In the runup to the Republican primary election in August, President Donald Trump endorsed Petersen's rival Josh Hawley and campaigned for him. Petersen expressed displeasure about Trump's involvement in the primary. In the August 7 primary Petersen came in third with 8.3% of the vote.

Endorsements
- Republican Liberty Caucus

== Political positions ==
Petersen has voiced and published his rejection of the non-aggression principle. Petersen describes himself as a minarchist. During his presidential campaign, he maintained that he had a "consistent pro-life ethic," meaning he is both pro-life and anti-death penalty. He opposes the war on drugs. He is a non-interventionist on most matters of foreign policy and applies a free-market capitalist approach to economics.

== Personal life ==
On social media and in interviews, Petersen has described himself variously as an agnostic and an atheist. He grew up as a Christian, though in a 2016 interview with Glenn Beck, Petersen spoke about how the death of his mother changed his religious views: "When I was a young man my mother died, and she was victimized by a pharmacist who diluted her chemotherapy drugs. I lost my faith and I never went back."

Petersen resides in Jefferson City, Missouri.

Petersen married Stephanie Renee Cole on October 23, 2021.

== Electoral history ==
Republican primary results, Missouri 2018
Party	Candidate	Votes	%
Republican	Josh Hawley	389,878	58.6%
Republican	Tony Monetti	64,834	9.8%
Republican	Austin Petersen	54,916	8.3%
Republican	Kristi Nichols	49,640	7.5%
Republican	Christina Smith	35,024	5.3%
Republican	Ken Patterson	19,579	3.0%
Republican	Peter Pfeifer	16,594	2.5%
Republican	Courtland Sykes	13,870	2.1%
Republican	Fred Ryman	8,781	1.3%
Republican	Brian Hagg	6,871	1.0%
Republican	Bradley Krembs	4,902	0.7%
Total votes		664,889	100%

== Filmography ==
- Alongside Night (2014) – Executive Producer
- Freedom Watch with Judge Napolitano (2010–12, 19 episodes) – Associate Producer

== See also ==
- Libertarian Party presidential primaries, 2016
- United States presidential election in Missouri, 2016
- United States Senate election in Missouri, 2018
- Stossel Libertarian presidential forum, 2016
