= 2000 West Virginia Democratic presidential primary =

- May 9, 2000

42 delegates to the Democratic National Convention (30 pledged, 12 unpledged) The number of pledged delegates received is determined by the primary vote

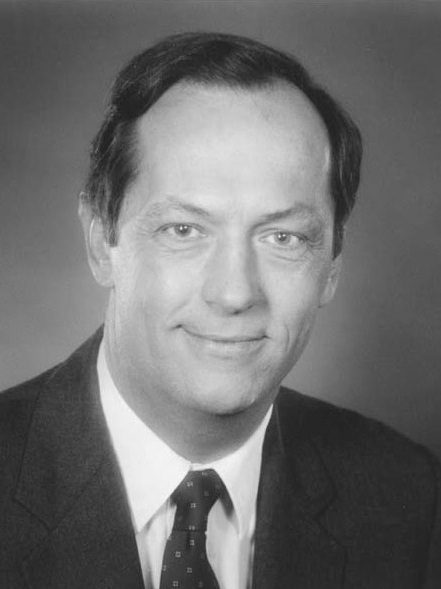
			AM
Candidate	Al Gore	Bill Bradley (withdrawn)	Angus W. McDonald
Home state	Tennessee	New Jersey	West Virginia
Delegate count	27	3	0
Popular vote	182,403	46,710	19,374
Percentage	72.01%	18.44%	7.65%
- County results Gore: 50–60% 60–70% 70–80% 80–90%

Pledged national convention delegates
Type	Del.
CD1	6
CD2	6
CD3	7
PLEO	4
At-large	7
Total pledged delegates	30

The 2000 West Virginia Democratic presidential primary took place on May 9, 2000 alongside the Nebraska primary, as part of the Democratic Party primaries for the 2000 presidential election. The West Virginia primary was a semi-closed primary, with the state awarding 42 delegates to the 2000 Democratic National Convention, of whom 30 were pledged delegates allocated on the basis of the primary results.

Vice president and recently determined presumptive nominee Al Gore swept the state and won 27 delegates with 72% of the vote, winning all 55 counties. Former senator Bill Bradley made the delegate threshold with little more than 18%, and Angus Wheeler McDonald, a farmer and resident of Charles Town, West Virginia, who did not appear on the ballot in any other state, received 7%.

== Procedure ==
West Virginia's Democratic primary took place on May 9, 2000, the same date as the Nebraska primary.

Voting took place throughout the state from 6:30 a.m. until 7:30 p.m.

In the semi-closed primary, candidates had to meet a threshold of 15 percent at the congressional district or statewide level in order to be considered viable. The 42 pledged delegates to the 2000 Democratic National Convention were allocated proportionally on the basis of the results of the primary. Of these, between 6 and 7 were allocated to each of the state's 3 congressional districts and another 4 were allocated to party leaders and elected officials (PLEO delegates), in addition to 7 at-large delegates.

The delegation included 11 unpledged PLEO delegates: 6 members of the Democratic National Committee and 5 members of Congress, two senators (Robert Byrd and Jay Rockefeller, and 3 representatives (Alan Mollohan, Bob Wise, and Nick Rahall).

== Candidates ==
The following candidates appeared on the ballot:

- Al Gore
- Angus W. McDonald
- Lyndon LaRouche Jr.

Withdrawn

- Bill Bradley

There was also an uncommitted option.

== Results ==
2000 West Virginia Democratic presidential primary
Candidate	Votes	%	Delegates
Al Gore	182,403	72.01	27
Bill Bradley (withdrawn)	46,710	18.44	3
Angus McDonald	19,374	7.65	
Lyndon LaRouche Jr.	4,823	1.90	
Uncommitted	-	-	12
Total	253,310	100%	42
