= 2000 Nebraska Democratic presidential primary =

- May 9, 2000

32 delegates to the Democratic National Convention (26 pledged, 6 unpledged) The number of pledged delegates received is determined by the popular vote

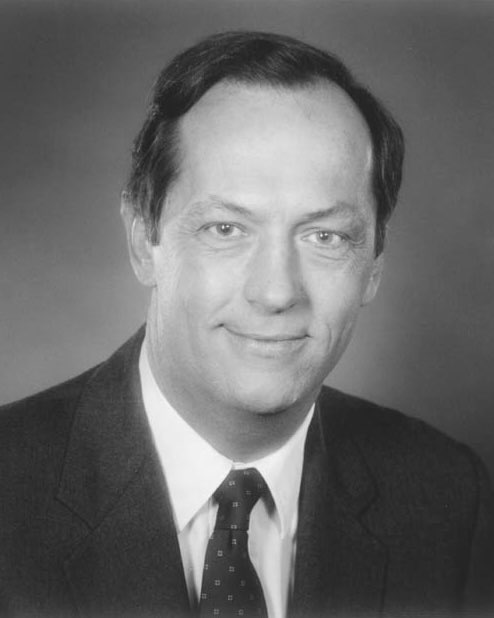
Candidate	Al Gore	Bill Bradley (withdrawn)
Home state	Tennessee	New Jersey
Delegate count	21	5
Popular vote	73,639	27,884
Percentage	69.38%	26.27%
- County results Gore: 40–50% 50–60% 60–70% 70–80% 80–90% Bradley: 50–60%

Pledged national convention delegates
Type	Del.
CD1	6
CD2	6
CD3	5
PLEO	3
At-large	6
Total pledged delegates	26

The 2000 Nebraska Democratic presidential primary took place on May 9, 2000, as part of the Democratic Party primaries for the 2000 presidential election. The Nebraska primary was a semi-closed primary and awarded 32 delegates to the 2000 Democratic National Convention, of which 26 were pledged delegates allocated on the basis of the results of the primary, and was one of two contests on that date.

Vice president Al Gore as the presumptive Democratic nominee won nearly 70% of the vote and 21 delegates, with senator Bill Bradley getting an overall statewide result of around 26% and won 5 delegates, although he had withdrawn 2 months prior. Lyndon LaRouche Jr. won just 3% of the vote but remained in the race.

== Procedure ==
Nebraska's Democratic primary took place on May 9, 2000, the same date as the West Virginia primary.

Voting started and ended simultaneously throughout the state, with polling places in the Central Time Zone open from 8:00 a.m. until 8:00 p.m. and those in the Mountain Time Zone open between 7:00 a.m. and 7:00 p.m. In the semi-closed primary, candidates had to meet a threshold of 15 percent at the congressional district or statewide level in order to be considered viable. The 26 pledged delegates to the 2000 Democratic National Convention were allocated proportionally on the basis of the results of the primary. Of these, between 5 and 6 were allocated to each of the state's 3 congressional districts and another 3 were allocated to party leaders and elected officials (PLEO delegates), in addition to 6 at-large delegates.

The 6 National Convention delegates consist of 5 Unpledged PLEOs and 1 Unpledged "add-on"s; these 6 delegates will go to the Democratic National Convention officially "Unpledged." The breakdown of unpledged delegates is 4 Democratic National Committee members, 1 Member of Congress (Senator Ben Nelson), and 1 add-on.

== Candidates ==
The following candidates appeared on the ballot:

- Al Gore
- Lyndon LaRouche Jr.

Withdrawn

- Bill Bradley

There was also an Uncommitted option.

== Results ==
2000 Nebraska Democratic presidential primary
Candidate	Votes	%	Delegates
Al Gore	73,639	69.38	21
Bill Bradley (withdrawn)	27,884	26.27	5
Lyndon LaRouche Jr.	3,191	3,191	
Write-in votes	1,431	1.35	
Uncommitted	-	-	6
Total	105,271	100%	32
