= The Rainbow Cadenza =

1983 book by J. Neil Schulman

- Author: J. Neil Schulman
- Language: English
- Genre: Science fiction
- Publisher: Simon & Schuster
- Publication date: May 16, 1983
- Publication place: United States
- Pages: ~400
- ISBN: 0-671-42003-8
- OCLC: 48610159

The Rainbow Cadenza is a science fiction novel by J. Neil Schulman which won the 1984 Prometheus Award for libertarian science fiction.

== Plot summary ==
The novel tells the story of Joan Darris, a laser art composer and performer, and her interactions with her society.

The novel portrays a future nominally-libertarian world government, in which many social taboos of the middle-twentieth century have been eliminated—for instance, gay marriage, drug use, sex work, and Wicca are all deemed socially acceptable. However, women, greatly outnumbered by men, are required to perform a three-year term of sexual servitude, and the "Touchables" underclass can be hunted for sport.

The main themes of the novel are social libertarianism vs. societal control, freedom of self, and what is permissible for the greater good.

== Legacy ==
It was published two years before Margaret Atwood's similarly themed The Handmaid's Tale.

Upon the 1986 publication of the Avon mass-market paperback Laserium coordinated an all-classical-music Rainbow Cadenza show which played at the Griffith Observatory and other planetarium venues in the United States and Canada.

== Reception ==
Beth Wickenberg writing for the Arizona Daily Star praised the novel's feminist content coming from a male writer:

"(Joan Darris) is a reminder that women in her future world still need liberation. It strikes me as strange – and fills me with hope – that a man would write a novel, especially a science-fiction novel, with such a feminist message. ... 'The Rainbow Cadenza' is imaginative and stylishly written, well worth its price for the moral questions it raises, even to those who are not science-fiction buffs. Schulman manipulates his words and characters much as the lasegrapher controls the colors and shapes of a composition. Each climaxes with a sign of hope: a rainbow."

Greg Costikyan reviewed The Rainbow Cadenza in Ares Magazine #16 and commented that "The Rainbow Cadenza is a personal novel of an artist attempting to survive and grow despite the oppression of the state, and attempting to discharge obligations to friends despite all legal and emotional obstacles. Jan Darris is, to my mind, one of the most appealing heroines of modern science fiction."
