= Garrett Wang =

American actor (born 1968)

- Wang at Dragon Con in 2026
- Born: Garrett Richard Wang; December 15, 1968 (age 57); Riverside, California, U.S.
- Other name: Wang Yi Jahn (王以瞻)
- Education: University of California, Los Angeles (BA)
- Years active: 1994–present

Chinese name
- Chinese: 王以瞻
Transcriptions
Standard Mandarin
- Hanyu Pinyin: Wáng Yǐzhān
- IPA: [wǎŋ ì.ʈʂán]
Southern Min
- Hokkien POJ: Ông Í-chiam

Garrett Richard Wang (/ˈwɑːŋ/; Chinese: 王以瞻; born December 15, 1968) is an American actor best known for his role of Ensign Harry Kim in Star Trek: Voyager.

== Early life and education ==
Wang was born in Riverside, California, to Taiwanese American immigrant parents. He has one sister. Growing up, Wang moved often. He attended kindergarten in Indiana before moving to Bermuda, then to Memphis, Tennessee, and then back to California.

In the summer of 1990, he attended a Taiwanese-state sponsored cultural exchange program. One of the reasons he decided to become an actor was to be a role model for other Asian-Americans seeking work in the entertainment industry, a predominantly non-Asian environment. Wang graduated from Harding Academy High School in Memphis.

Wang's parents did not support his acting ambitions. His father emigrated from Taiwan to attend graduate school in the States and did not view acting as a stable career choice. His mother was accepted to the Taiwan School of Drama in her youth, but did not attend it due to her father's objections. When his parents met actress Bonnie Franklin at an airport in Hawaii, she told them that Wang would never make it in the business. His mother eventually even suggested that he join the military to learn some discipline.

Wang attended college at the University of California, Los Angeles. He switched majors multiple times, going from biology to political science to history to economics and finally Asian studies, with all his upper-division electives in theater.

== Career ==
When Wang decided to become a full-time actor, he made a deal with his parents that, if he was not successful within two years, he would quit, on the condition that they helped finance his expenses. After finding no work for months, he managed to book a few roles in commercials. This exposure got him a guest-star role in 1994 on the episode "Submission:Impossible" of Margaret Cho's All-American Girl as Raymond Han, a financially stable single doctor.

Wang starred in Eric Koyanagi's MFA thesis film at USC film school, Angry Cafe (1995). He subsequently came back to star in Koyanagi's feature directorial debut, hundred percent (1998), which also was Wang's feature debut. Both films were written and directed by, and starred Asian Americans.

A year and a half after his wager with his parents, Wang landed his best-known role, that of Ensign Harry Kim in Star Trek: Voyager, which ran from 1995 to 2001.

In 2005, Wang played Chow Ping in the TV miniseries Into The West, which was executive produced by Steven Spielberg.

He played Garan in the 2007 fan production Star Trek: Of Gods and Men, saying, "it’s always more challenging for an actor to play the bad guy."

=== Theatre ===
In 1993, while a student at UCLA, Wang portrayed John Lee, a gay British Chinese teenager who kills his Irish lover, in Chay Yew's play, Porcelain, at the now defunct Burbage Theater in Sawtelle, Los Angeles.

== Star Trek ==
From early childhood on, actor Garrett Wang was a science-fiction fan, in particular of Star Wars and Battlestar Galactica.

He watched all the Star Trek films that came out in the theaters, but didn't follow Star Trek: The Next Generation (TNG) prior to working on Voyager. The first season-one TNG episode he saw was "Code of Honor", which he said all Trek writers considered "the worst episode ever produced". On three occasions, within a year and a half, he tried to watch TNG again, and it was always a repeat of "Code of Honor".

On a convention panel in 2015, Wang said of this: "I realized God was telling me ‘Don’t become a fan of TNG!’ Because I would have been too nervous to audition for Voyager. So really, God helped me get on Voyager."

At Star Trek Las Vegas in 2014, Wang was announced to be reprising his role as Harry Kim in "Delta Rising", the second expansion of the massively multiplayer online role-playing game, Star Trek Online.

=== Conventions ===
Wang has been a celebrity moderator interviewing other celebrities at various conventions around the world since 2008.

In 2010, he was named the director of the Trek Track for Dragon Con, becoming the first actor to work behind the scenes at a convention.

Wang has participated in the Calgary Comic and Entertainment Expo, in 2012 interviewing Stan Lee and being present at a booth among other exhibitors, and as a surprise speaker at TNG Exposed.

== Personal life ==
Through November 2017, Wang hosted a weekly podcast on Twitch. He discussed his post-Star Trek work as a convention moderator, and other anecdotes of his life.

He currently co-hosts The Delta Flyers Podcast with Robert Duncan McNeill, who portrayed Tom Paris in Voyager.

He is a Baptist.

== Filmography ==
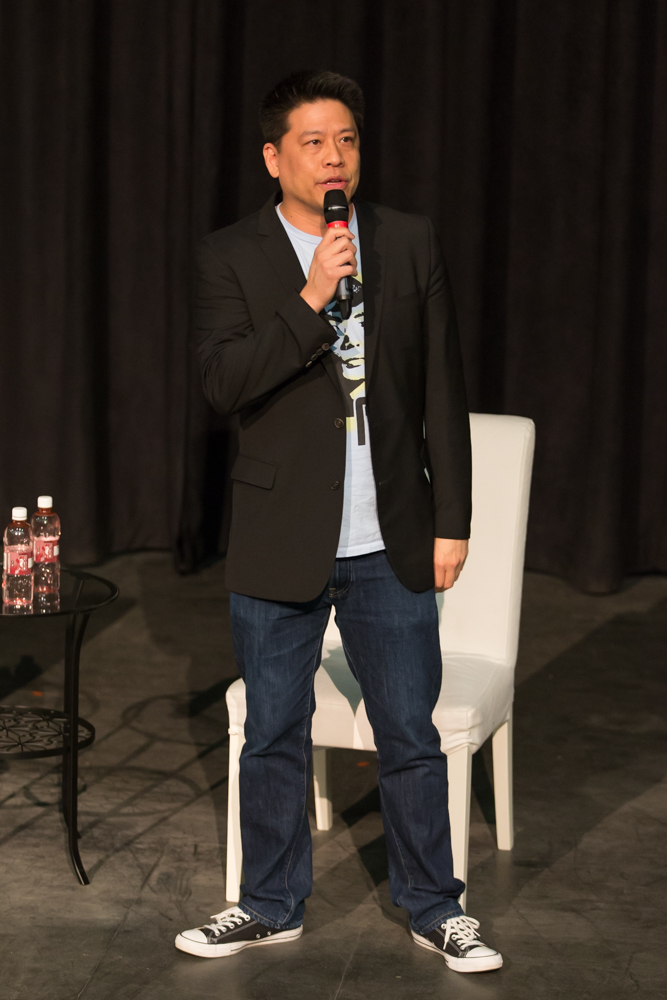
Garrett Wang interacts with the audience at his panel at the Calgary Expo 2015.

=== Film ===
Year	Title	Role	Notes
1995	Flesh Suitcase		
1995	Angry Cafe	No Name	Short film
1998	Hundred Percent	Troy Tashima	
1998	Ivory Tower	Mark	
1999	The Auteur Theory	Mike Wong/God	
2002	Demon Island	Paul	
2005	Deja Vu		Short video film
2006	The Money Spread	Taylor Vin	Short film
2009	Why Am I Doing This?	Vic Vu	
2009	The Ride	Henry	Short film
2014	Alongside Night	Major Chin	Based on the book of the same name
2020	Unbelievable!!!!!	Dr. Charles Hunter	
2020	Monster Force Zero		

=== Television ===
Year	Title	Role	Notes
1994	All-American Girl	Raymond Han	Episode: "Submission Impossible"
1995–2001	Star Trek: Voyager	Harry Kim	TV series; main role 172 episodes
2002	Into the West	Chow-Ping Yen	TV miniseries Episode: "Hell on Wheels"
2007	Star Trek: Of Gods and Men	Commander Garan	Miniseries; 3 episodes
2015	American Dad!	Chinese Man	Episode: "American Fung"
2024	Star Trek: Lower Decks	Alternate Harry Kims	Episode: "Fissure Quest"

=== Video games ===
Year	Title	Role	Notes
2002	Star Trek: Voyager – Elite Force	Harry Kim	Voice role
2014	Star Trek Online	Harry Kim	Voice role
2023	Truth	Host	
