= Alongside Night =

1979 novel by J. Neil Schulman

- First edition
- Author: J. Neil Schulman
- Cover artist: Lydia Rosier
- Language: English
- Subject: Agorism
- Genre: Science fiction
- Publisher: Crown Publishers
- Publication date: October 16, 1979
- Publication place: United States
- ISBN: 978-1-58445-120-4
- OCLC: 43026939

Alongside Night is a dystopian novel by science fiction writer J. Neil Schulman intended to articulate the principles of Agorism, a political philosophy created by Samuel Edward Konkin III, to whom Schulman dedicated the work. It was first published in 1979 by Crown Publishers, with subsequent paperback editions released by Ace Books in 1982, Avon Books in 1987, Pulpless.com in 1999, and Amazon Kindle in 2009.

The novel received endorsements from Anthony Burgess and Milton Friedman and was entered into the Libertarian Futurist Society's Prometheus Hall of Fame in 1989. Ross Ulbricht credited the novel and Konkin's writings as inspirations for the creation of the online marketplace Silk Road.

A film adaptation, written and directed by Schulman, was released in 2014 via Tugg and later on Amazon Prime and home video. It was accompanied by an audiobook version of the novel as well as a graphic novel adaptation of the screenplay.

== Plot summary ==
The story begins with the United States collapsing economically and the government's agents struggling to keep their power after central banks over-inflated the money supply. Trading in foreign currency is illegal and businesses are subject to rationing. As a result, there is a growing black market for everything.

Elliot Vreeland, son of Nobel Laureate Austrian School economist Dr. Martin Vreeland, learns of his father's apparent death, and is rushed home from school. Elliot learns his father has faked his death to escape arrest by the government agents who are detaining "radicals" accused of worsening the economic crisis. Elliot is sent by his father to collect some gold coins stored in case the family has to escape.

Upon returning home, Elliot finds his family missing. Government agents enter the house searching for Elliot, who manages to escape.

Elliot becomes acquainted with the Revolutionary Agorist Cadre, an organization plotting the end of the government agents by means of counter-economics. The cadre is strong and organized, and has its militia. Elliot enlists their help, and meets Lorimer, a girl hiding from the government agents; they develop a relationship.

As the government agents weaken, they tighten controls on communication, travel, and trade. This fails to avert economic collapse, causing the private sector – unions, syndicates, and individuals outside of these organizations – to control the old infrastructure.

== Film adaptation ==
In 2013, Schulman completed production on a feature-film adaptation of the book, Alongside Night.
