= Freedom Watch with Judge Napolitano =

US television program

- Genre: Talk show, Political commentary
- Presented by: Andrew Napolitano
- Country of origin: United States
- Original language: English

Production
- Running time: 60 minutes (original series); 6 minutes (revival series)

Original release
- Network: Fox Business Network
- Release: February 11, 2009
- Release: June 12, 2010 – February 13, 2012
- Release: May 24, 2016 – November 7, 2018

Freedom Watch with Judge Napolitano is a television show hosted by Judge Andrew Napolitano, on Fox Business Network. The show aired from 2009 to 2012, focusing mainly on libertarian issues and perspectives.

== The show ==
Freedom Watch was created in February 2009 as an online show and originally webcast once a week. In September 2009, the show began webcasting three or four times a week. Frequent guests of the online show included Congressman Ron Paul, Lew Rockwell, and Peter Schiff.

In May 2010, it was announced that the show would be televised on the Fox Business Network. The first televised episode, dubbed the "Tea Party Summit," aired on June 12, 2010 at 10:00 A.M., and featured then-Congressman Ron Paul; former Alaska Governor Sarah Palin; then-U.S. Senate Republican candidate, now-U.S. Senator Rand Paul of Kentucky; Pennsylvania Governor Ed Rendell; U.S. Senator Jim DeMint; Congresswoman Michele Bachmann; and former U.S. House Majority Leader Dick Armey.

On Monday, 15 November 2010, Freedom Watch with Judge Napolitano began to air new episodes every weeknight at 8:00 P.M. ET. Initially described as "the top-rated show on Fox Business," its ratings apparently began to slip in 2011.

=== Format ===
Judge Napolitano followed a pattern on the show:

Each episode started with a short description of a liberty-oriented issue, laid out specifically as a segue into the phrase

... upheld [or undermined, or needs to learn] these principles:

- That government is best which governs least.
- The people are entitled to a government that stays within the confines of the Constitution.
- The Constitution was written to keep the government off the people's backs.

Napolitano would then have guests with whom he discussed various issues of the day.

In the next segment of each episode, which he called the Freedom Files, he would itemise some violations or victories of freedom.

The second to last segment in each episode was a round table with a group of people of various political inclinations, anointed his Freedom Fighters. He would always have one person of a generally "liberal" outlook, one person of a generally "conservative" outlook, and one person of a generally "libertarian" outlook in this round table.

Each episode was then summed up with a monologue given by Napolitano, describing how the principles of liberty and justice applied to the issues at hand. This final segment was called The Plain Truth.

=== Cancellation ===
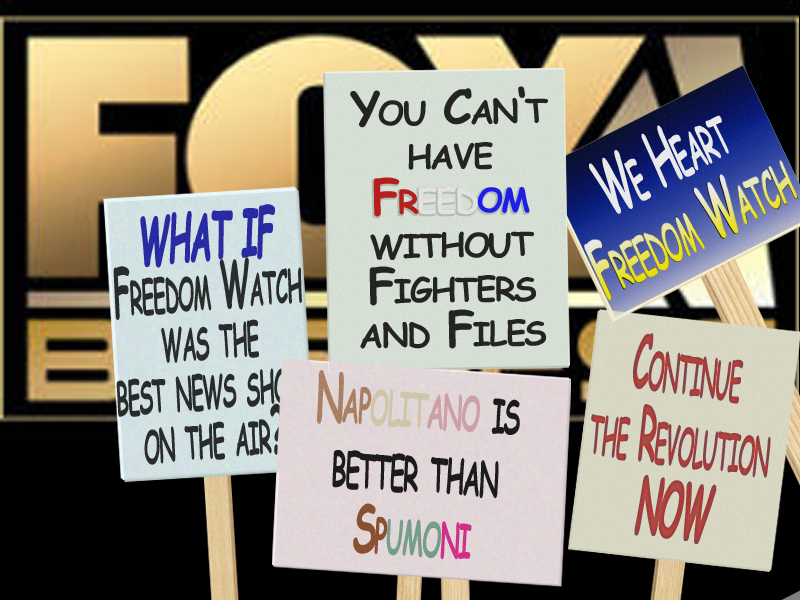
Satirical graphic advocating the return of Freedom Watch, using catch phrases from the show, integrated into each protest sign

In February 2012, Fox Business announced that while Napolitano would remain a network contributor, Freedom Watch (along with two other shows) was cancelled, in preference for a new lineup that would simply re-run popular episodes of other Fox Business shows each day. The final episode was aired on Monday, 13 February 2012.

=== Return ===
On May 24, 2016 Fox News posted an approximate five-minute episode of Freedom Watch, and a second one on June 7, 2016. In an interview with Reason's Nick Gillespie posted on July 18, 2018, Napolitano announced that the show would be returning to the air "probably before Thanksgiving" in 2018. On November 27, 2018 Napolitano began the show on Fox Nation, with the show re-titled Liberty File with Judge Napolitano.
