= Marc Allan Feldman =

American politician (1959–2016)

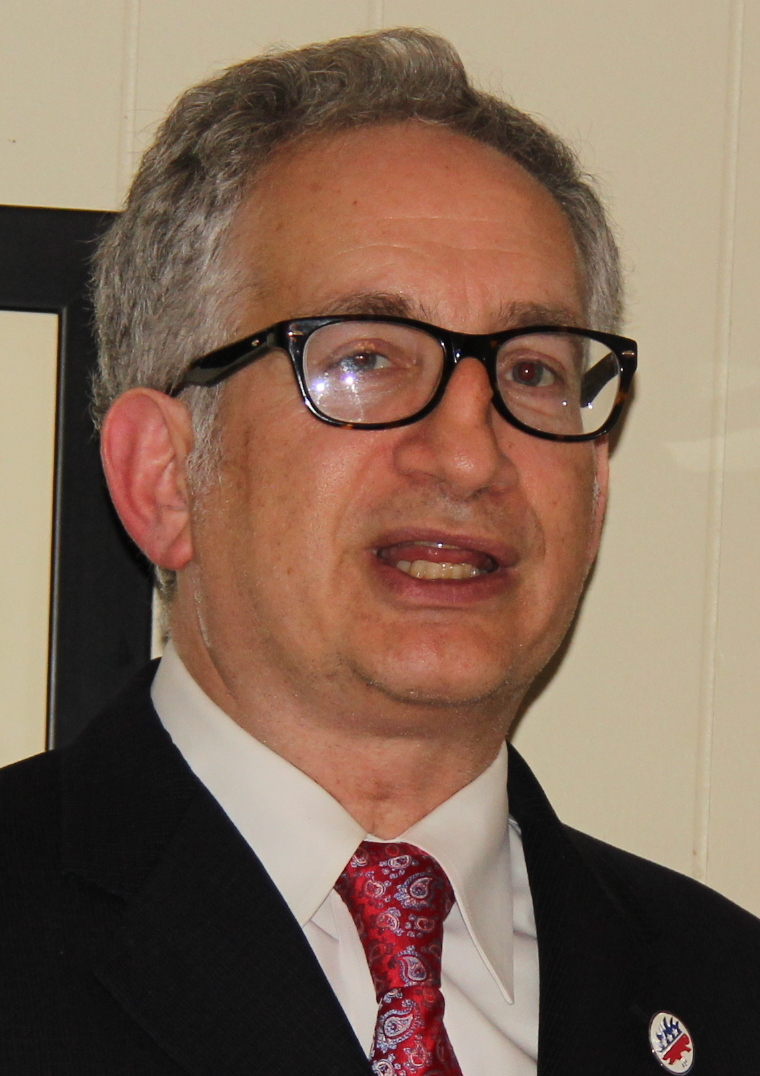
- Feldman in 2015
- Born: October 7, 1959; Washington, D.C.
- Died: June 22, 2016 (aged 56); Brook Park, Ohio
- Citizenship: United States
- Education: Johns Hopkins School of Medicine
- Occupations: Physician, political commentator, activist
- Known for: 2016 presidential candidate
- Political party: Libertarian Party

Marc Allan Feldman (October 10, 1959 – June 22, 2016) was an American physician, political commentator, and activist. He had been employed at the Cleveland Clinic from 1998 to 2016. He was also the owner of a small business called Openivo, Inc. Feldman had also served as the president of the Ophthalmic Anesthesia Society.

On January 13, 2015 Feldman announced that he was running for President of the United States in the 2016 election as a Libertarian. His main goal in running was to address how much money influences the political system. He had called his campaign "Votes Not For Sale" and wouldn't take any donations over $5. On May 26, 2016, Feldman participated in a political debate at the 2016 Libertarian National Convention, alongside Gary Johnson, Austin Petersen, John McAfee, and Darryl W. Perry. Feldman would place fifth on the second nominating ballot, losing to Gary Johnson.

On June 22, 2016, Dr. Feldman was found unresponsive at the America's Best Value Inn in Brook Park, Ohio. He was pronounced dead at the scene a short time later. The cause of death was atherosclerotic cardiovascular disease.
