= 2020 Nebraska Democratic presidential primary =

- May 12, 2020

33 delegates (29 pledged, 4 unpledged) to the Democratic National Convention The number of pledged delegates won is determined by the popular vote

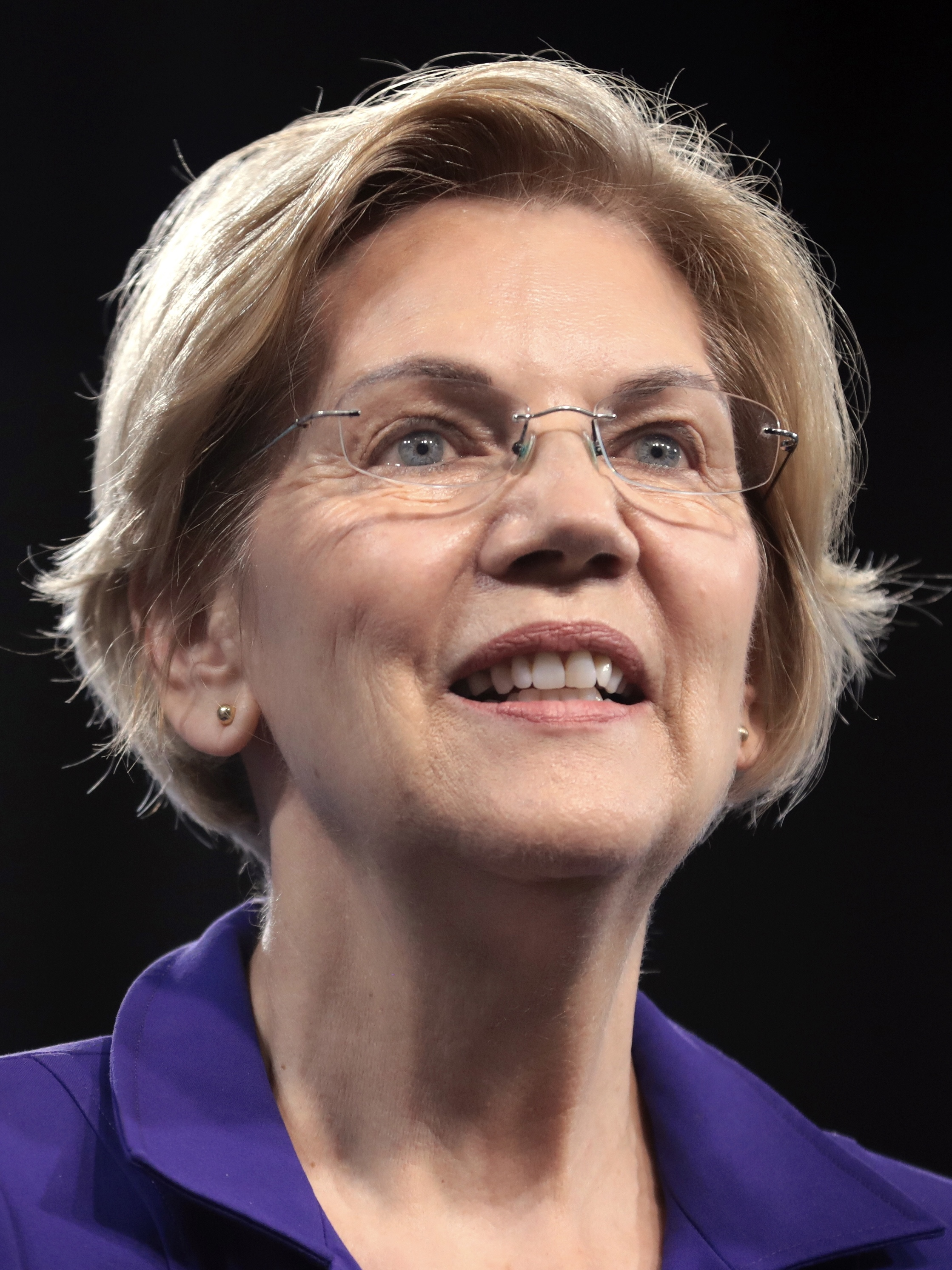
Candidate	Joe Biden	Bernie Sanders (withdrawn)	Elizabeth Warren (withdrawn)
Home state	Delaware	Vermont	Massachusetts
Delegate count	29	0	0
Popular vote	126,444	23,214	10,401
Percentage	76.83%	14.10%	6.32%
- County results Joe Biden

Pledged national convention delegates
Type	Del.
CD1	7
CD2	9
CD3	4
PLEO	3
At-large	6
Total pledged delegates	29

The 2020 Nebraska Democratic presidential primary took place on May 12, 2020, as part of the Democratic Party primaries for the 2020 presidential election. The Nebraska primary was a semi-closed primary and awarded 33 delegates to the 2020 Democratic National Convention, of which 29 were pledged delegates allocated on the basis of the results of the primary, and was the only contest on that date.

Former vice president Joe Biden as the sole remaining Democratic candidate won nearly 77% of the vote and all 29 delegates, with senator Bernie Sanders getting an overall statewide result of around 14% and very narrowly missing out on winning a delegate in the 2nd congressional district, and senator Elizabeth Warren as one of only two other withdrawn candidates on the ballot receiving 6%. Nebraska was the first state in the Democratic primaries to hand all of its delegates to one candidate.

== Procedure ==
While the Democratic Party of Nebraska previously had used caucuses as their nominating process, the party's central committee decided on December 8, 2018 to return to a primary system after the proposal had been "overwhelmingly" supported in a voice vote.

Voting started and ended simultaneously throughout the state, with polling places in the Central Time Zone open from 8:00 a.m. until 8:00 p.m. and those in the Mountain Time Zone open between 7:00 a.m. and 7:00 p.m. In the semi-closed primary, candidates had to meet a threshold of 15 percent at the congressional district or statewide level in order to be considered viable. The 29 pledged delegates to the 2020 Democratic National Convention were allocated proportionally on the basis of the results of the primary. Of these, between 4 and 9 were allocated to each of the state's 3 congressional districts and another 3 were allocated to party leaders and elected officials (PLEO delegates), in addition to 6 at-large delegates. Originally planned with 25 delegates, the final number included a 20% bonus of 4 additional delegates on the 17 district and 5 at-large delegates by the Democratic National Committee due to the May date, which belonged to Stage III on the primary timetable.

County conventions were subsequently held between May 17 and May 31, 2020 to elect delegates to the state convention, which was held between June 13 and June 14, 2020. The state convention voted on June 13, 2020 to designate all pledged national convention delegates. The delegation also included 4 unpledged PLEO delegates: 4 members of the Democratic National Committee.

== Candidates ==
The following candidates were on the ballot in Nebraska:

- Joe Biden
- Tulsi Gabbard (withdrawn)
- Bernie Sanders (withdrawn)
- Elizabeth Warren (withdrawn)

Michael Bloomberg, Pete Buttigieg, Amy Klobuchar and Tom Steyer had also qualified but had withdrawn before the deadline on March 10 and were taken off the ballot.

== Results ==
2020 Nebraska Democratic presidential primary
Candidate	Votes	%	Delegates
Joe Biden	126,444	76.83	29
Bernie Sanders (withdrawn)	23,214	14.10	
Elizabeth Warren (withdrawn)	10,401	6.32	
Tulsi Gabbard (withdrawn)	4,523	2.75	
Total	164,582	100%	29

Results by county
County	Joe Biden		Tulsi Gabbard		Bernie Sanders		Elizabeth Warren	
County	Votes	%	Votes	%	Votes	%	Votes	%
Adams	1,483	77.60%	65	3.40%	242	12.66%	121	6.33%
Antelope	216	77.42%	22	7.89%	22	7.89%	21	7.53%
Arthur	9	90.00%	1	10.00%	0	0.00%	0	0.00%
Banner	12	92.31%	0	0.00%	0	0.00%	1	7.69%
Blaine	14	93.33%	0	0.00%	0	0.00%	1	6.67%
Boone	246	74.55%	28	8.48%	29	8.79%	27	8.18%
Box Butte	442	79.21%	24	4.30%	57	10.22%	35	6.27%
Boyd	60	78.95%	3	3.95%	6	7.89%	7	9.21%
Brown	57	69.51%	5	6.10%	14	17.07%	6	7.32%
Buffalo	1,900	76.74%	91	3.68%	331	13.37%	154	6.22%
Burt	477	82.38%	15	2.59%	52	8.98%	35	6.04%
Butler	352	78.22%	20	4.44%	47	10.44%	31	6.89%
Cass	1,584	81.52%	77	3.96%	183	9.42%	99	5.10%
Cedar	358	71.31%	46	9.16%	46	9.16%	52	10.36%
Chase	84	73.68%	8	7.02%	8	7.02%	14	12.28%
Cherry	147	74.24%	10	5.05%	23	11.62%	18	9.09%
Cheyenne	313	78.45%	14	3.51%	45	11.28%	27	6.77%
Clay	266	74.72%	19	5.34%	49	13.76%	22	6.18%
Colfax	354	77.80%	28	6.15%	41	9.01%	32	7.03%
Cuming	304	80.21%	22	5.80%	23	6.07%	30	7.92%
Custer	327	80.94%	27	6.68%	28	6.93%	22	5.45%
Dakota	664	80.10%	29	3.50%	98	11.82%	38	4.58%
Dawes	389	71.12%	20	3.66%	91	16.64%	47	8.59%
Dawson	562	77.52%	26	3.59%	98	13.52%	39	5.38%
Deuel	44	80.00%	1	1.82%	4	7.27%	6	10.91%
Dixon	270	76.49%	26	7.37%	31	8.78%	26	7.37%
Dodge	2,016	80.10%	88	3.50%	275	10.93%	138	5.48%
Douglas	43,383	77.23%	1,157	2.06%	8,236	14.66%	3,401	6.05%
Dundy	35	68.63%	2	3.92%	6	11.76%	8	15.69%
Fillmore	325	78.13%	23	5.53%	37	8.89%	31	7.45%
Franklin	137	86.71%	7	4.43%	7	4.43%	7	4.43%
Frontier	80	87.91%	5	5.49%	5	5.49%	2	2.20%
Furnas	120	75.00%	11	6.88%	19	11.88%	10	6.25%
Gage	1,558	82.09%	73	3.85%	170	8.96%	97	5.11%
Garden	67	82.72%	4	4.94%	6	7.41%	4	4.94%
Garfield	52	92.86%	0	0.00%	2	3.57%	2	3.57%
Gosper	73	82.95%	2	2.27%	9	10.23%	4	4.55%
Grant	10	76.92%	1	7.69%	0	0.00%	2	15.38%
Greeley	155	75.24%	20	9.71%	14	6.80%	17	8.25%
Hall	2,633	78.29%	116	3.45%	418	12.43%	196	5.83%
Hamilton	393	79.88%	23	4.67%	46	9.35%	30	6.10%
Harlan	119	73.01%	14	8.59%	19	11.66%	11	6.75%
Hayes	17	85.00%	2	10.00%	0	0.00%	1	5.00%
Hitchcock	86	76.79%	3	2.68%	13	11.61%	10	8.93%
Holt	289	76.25%	21	5.54%	43	11.35%	26	6.86%
Hooker	28	75.68%	0	0.00%	6	16.22%	3	8.11%
Howard	327	78.61%	26	6.25%	37	8.89%	26	6.25%
Jefferson	438	81.41%	23	4.28%	51	9.48%	26	4.83%
Johnson	281	80.75%	17	4.89%	33	9.48%	17	4.89%
Kearney	305	83.56%	17	4.66%	28	7.67%	15	4.11%
Keith	255	81.73%	12	3.85%	27	8.65%	18	5.77%
Keya Paha	28	82.35%	3	8.82%	1	2.94%	2	5.88%
Kimball	103	80.47%	3	2.34%	18	14.06%	4	3.13%
Knox	436	78.14%	31	5.56%	51	9.14%	40	7.17%
Lancaster	27,239	75.23%	757	2.09%	5,659	15.63%	2,552	7.05%
Lincoln	1,480	78.68%	108	5.74%	193	10.26%	100	5.32%
Logan	10	71.43%	1	7.14%	0	0.00%	3	21.43%
Loup	33	80.49%	0	0.00%	7	17.07%	1	2.44%
Madison	1,062	75.37%	66	4.68%	170	12.07%	111	7.88%
McPherson	9	75.00%	0	0.00%	2	16.67%	1	8.33%
Merrick	299	74.38%	24	5.97%	45	11.19%	34	8.46%
Morrill	173	89.64%	3	1.55%	10	5.18%	7	3.63%
Nance	153	81.38%	8	4.26%	16	8.51%	11	5.85%
Nemaha	388	79.35%	17	3.48%	56	11.45%	28	5.73%
Nuckolls	218	84.82%	10	3.89%	15	5.84%	14	5.45%
Otoe	882	80.99%	36	3.31%	112	10.28%	59	5.42%
Pawnee	179	84.04%	8	3.76%	18	8.45%	8	3.76%
Perkins	84	83.17%	7	6.93%	1	0.99%	9	8.91%
Phelps	329	76.87%	23	5.37%	48	11.21%	28	6.54%
Pierce	155	74.52%	12	5.77%	26	12.50%	15	7.21%
Platte	1,099	77.67%	90	6.36%	145	10.25%	81	5.72%
Polk	217	86.11%	11	4.37%	9	3.57%	15	5.95%
Red Willow	325	74.71%	27	6.21%	54	12.41%	29	6.67%
Richardson	487	81.17%	25	4.17%	52	8.67%	36	6.00%
Rock	30	73.17%	1	2.44%	5	12.20%	5	12.20%
Saline	824	80.47%	37	3.61%	103	10.06%	60	5.86%
Sarpy	12,244	78.64%	367	2.36%	2,154	13.83%	805	5.17%
Saunders	1,160	78.06%	80	5.38%	160	10.77%	86	5.79%
Scotts Bluff	1,249	81.32%	65	4.23%	158	10.29%	64	4.17%
Seward	900	79.30%	48	4.23%	117	10.31%	70	6.17%
Sheridan	112	78.32%	7	4.90%	13	9.09%	11	7.69%
Sherman	197	73.78%	16	5.99%	37	13.86%	17	6.37%
Sioux	38	79.17%	3	6.25%	4	8.33%	3	6.25%
Stanton	185	73.12%	17	6.72%	29	11.46%	22	8.70%
Thayer	247	82.06%	8	2.66%	25	8.31%	21	6.98%
Thomas	24	88.89%	0	0.00%	3	11.11%	0	0.00%
Thurston	259	64.75%	13	3.25%	107	26.75%	21	5.25%
Valley	199	81.56%	12	4.92%	20	8.20%	13	5.33%
Washington	1,153	83.25%	41	2.96%	134	9.68%	57	4.12%
Wayne	310	77.31%	13	3.24%	45	11.22%	33	8.23%
Webster	172	79.63%	9	4.17%	18	8.33%	17	7.87%
Wheeler	30	85.71%	2	5.71%	0	0.00%	3	8.57%
York	493	81.35%	23	3.80%	56	9.24%	34	5.61%

== See also ==
- 2020 Nebraska Republican presidential primary
