= Tugg Inc. =

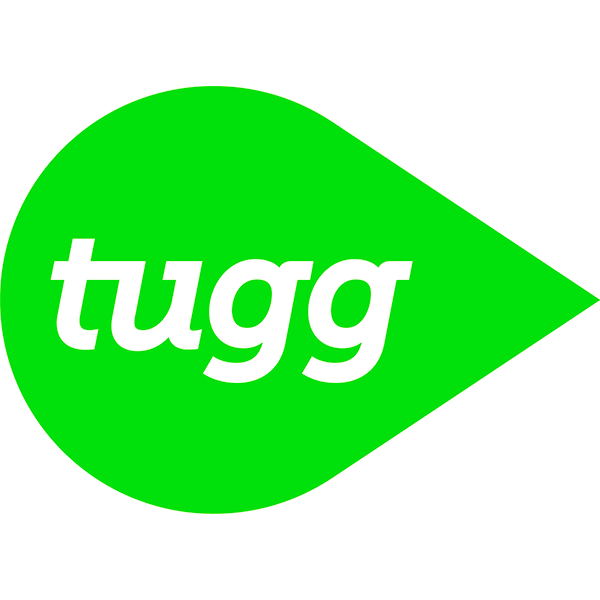
- Company type: Private company
- Industry: Film industry
- Founded: 2011
- Founders: Nicolas Gonda and Pablo Gonzalez
- Defunct: January 2020
- Fate: Bankrupt
- Headquarters: Austin, Texas, United States
- Area served: United States
- Products: On demand cinema
- Website: tugg.com

Tugg was an American film-based crowdsourcing platform that enabled individuals to create film screenings at their local cinema. Tugg ceased operations in January 2020.

Incorporated in 2011, Tugg was officially launched in 2012 at SXSW by co-founders Nicolas Gonda and Pablo Gonzalez. Headquartered in Austin, Texas, it offered services for promoters, filmmakers, and theaters.

== Services ==
=== Promoters ===
Screening "hosts" selected a movie from Tugg's library of studio and independent films, chose from available theaters, dates, timeslots, and set other event details like ticket price; then, a set number of people needed to commit to attend before the event was actually on, in order to crowdsource the viewing. Tugg provided promotional resources and tips, but the promoter was responsible for publicity.

Tugg allowed filmmakers to show their films in movie theatres, allowing consumers to select the movies they wanted to see. This distribution method, credited to Gonda, was "supposed to complement existing distribution methods".

Tugg, Inc closed shortly after Distribber. With these avenues gone, independent filmmakers must seek other way to get their films out to the world.

=== Education ===
Tugg had a department focused on Educational and Non-Theatrical communities, TuggEDU. It sold screening licenses to "effectively monetize the non-theatrical interest in a film".

In 2016 Tugg launched the film The Last Gold in partnership with USA Swimming,"
