= J. Neil Schulman =

American novelist (1953–2019)

- Born: Joseph Neil Schulman; April 16, 1953; New York City, U.S.
- Died: August 10, 2019 (aged 66); Colorado Springs, Colorado, U.S.
- Occupations: Novelist; filmmaker; actor; journalist; composer; publisher
- Writing career
- Genre: Libertarian science fiction
- Movement: Libertarianism
- Website: jneilschulman.com

Joseph Neil Schulman (/ˈʃuːlmən/; April 16, 1953 – August 10, 2019) was an American novelist who wrote Alongside Night (published 1979) and The Rainbow Cadenza (published 1983), which both received the Prometheus Award, a libertarian science fiction award. His third novel, Escape from Heaven, was also a finalist for the 2002 Prometheus Award. His fourth and last novel, The Fractal Man, was a finalist for the 2019 Prometheus Award.

== Biography ==
Schulman was born in Forest Hills, Queens, New York City on April 16, 1953. He was the author of nine other books, including a short story collection, Nasty, Brutish, and Short Stories, Stopping Power: Why 70 Million Americans Own Guns, and The Robert Heinlein Interview and Other Heinleiniana.

He wrote the Twilight Zone episode "Profile in Silver", first broadcast on CBS March 7, 1986. Schulman died on August 10, 2019, at the age of 66, three days after suffering a pulmonary embolism.

== Filmmaking ==
Schulman was the writer, director, executive producer (along with Nichelle Nichols) of the movie Lady Magdalene's, which was produced by Schulman's own company Jesulu Productions. The movie won three film-festival awards: "Best Cutting Edge Film" at the 2008 San Diego Black Film Festival, "Audience Choice – Feature-Length Narrative Film" at the 2008 Cinema City International Film Festival held at Universal CityWalk Hollywood, and "Special Jury Prize for Libertarian Ideals" at the 2011 Anthem Film Festival/FreedomFest held at Bally's Las Vegas.

In 2013, Schulman completed production on a feature-film of Alongside Night, starring Kevin Sorbo, Jake Busey, Tim Russ, Garrett Wang, Mara Marini, and Gary Graham. The movie premiered in 2014 and had a limited theatrical release. It was released for streaming on iTunes, Amazon Video and Amazon Prime and as a Blu-ray/DVD combo pack.

== Views ==
Schulman was a known proponent of the anarcho-capitalist, libertarian philosophy agorism, which was developed by Samuel Edward Konkin III. Though originally a supporter of the war on terror, he was opposed to U.S. military occupations or operations in the Middle East. Schulman also supported free trade and was against tariffs.

== Books ==
Schulman is author of:

- Alongside Night (Crown Publishers, 1979; Pulpless.Com 1999) Libertarian Futurist Society gold medallion winner, 1989
- The Rainbow Cadenza (Simon & Schuster, 1983; Pulpless.Com, 2017) 1984 Prometheus Award winner for Best Libertarian SF Novel
- Self Control Not Gun Control (Synapse-Centurion, 1995; Pulpless.Com 1999)
- Profile in Silver and Other Screenwritings (Pulpless.Com, 1999)
- The Frame of the Century? (Pulpless.Com, 1999)
- Escape from Heaven (Pulpless.Com, 2002) 2003 Prometheus Award finalist for Best Libertarian SF Novel
- The Heartmost Desire (Pulpless.Com, 2013)
- Unchaining the Human Heart – A Revolutionary Manifesto (Pulpless.Com, 2017)
- I Met God – God without Religion, Scripture, or Faith (Pulpless.Com, 2017)
- Atheist to Believer (Pulpless.Com, 2017)
- J. Neil Schulman's The Book of Words (Pulpless.Com, 2017)
- The Fractal Man (Steve Heller Publishing, 2018) 2019 Prometheus Award finalist for Best Libertarian SF Novel
- Origitent: Why Original Content Is Property (Steve Heller Publishing, 2018)
- Why Original Content Is Property – Kindle edition by J. Neil Schulman, Wendy McElroy, Samuel Edward Konkin III, Stephan Kinsella, Steve Heller.
