= Samuel Edward Konkin III =

Canadian-American anarchist (1947–2004)

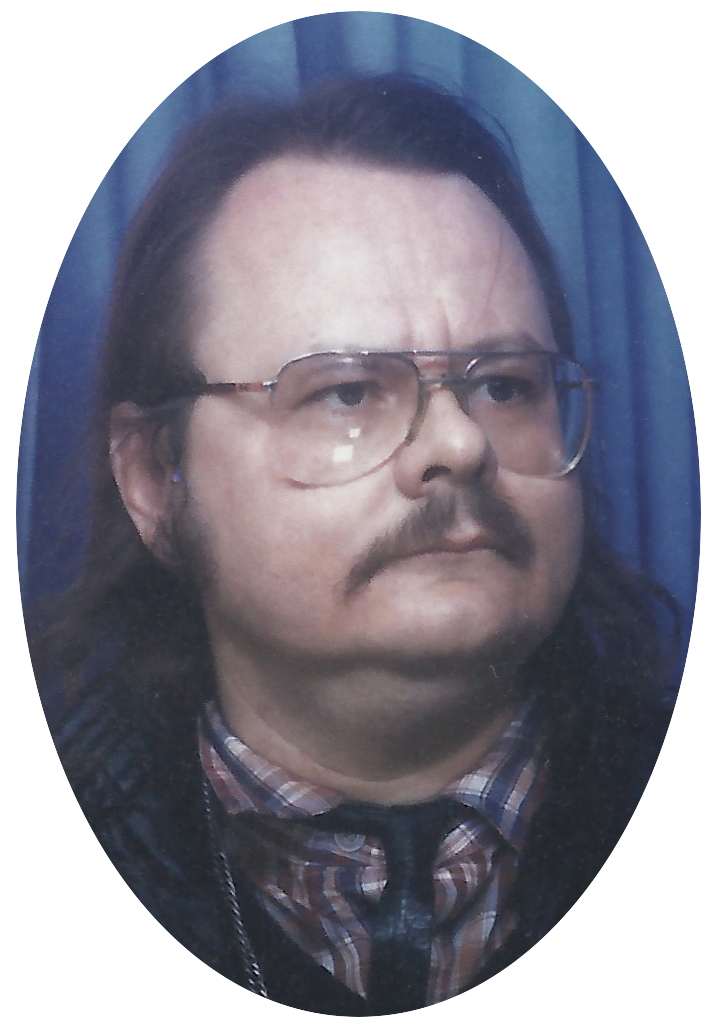
- Born: July 8, 1947; Edmonton, Alberta, Canada
- Died: February 23, 2004 (aged 56); West Los Angeles, California, U.S.
- Other name: SEK3
- Education: University of Alberta
- Spouse: Sheila Wymer

Samuel Edward Konkin III (July 8, 1947 – February 23, 2004), also known as SEK3, was a Canadian-American libertarian writer. As the author of the publication New Libertarian Manifesto, he was a proponent of a political philosophy he named agorism.

== Personal life ==
Konkin was born on July 8, 1947, in Edmonton, Alberta, to Samuel Edward Konkin II and Helen Konkin. He had one brother named Alan. He married Sheila Wymer in 1990 and had one son named James Eaton-Konkin. The marriage ended soon afterward. Konkin was an atheist. Konkin was also noted for his style of dress: "To show his anarchist beliefs, he dressed completely in black, a color associated with that movement since the late nineteenth century".

On February 23, 2004, Konkin died of natural causes in his apartment in West Los Angeles, California. He was buried alongside his father in Edmonton, Alberta.

== Fanzine contributions ==
Konkin was a lifelong fan of C. S. Lewis and J. R. R. Tolkien and an avid fanzine contributor. He was a known figure among science fiction/fantasy fans for his writing on Alarums and Excursions and the like. In a 1976 issue of Alarums and Excursions, Konkin published a drawing depicting Dungeons & Dragons writers Gary Gygax, Len Lakofka and Tim Kask being hanged by a group of women. This came in the wake of community backlash after Lakofka had suggested new rules for women that would have rated their "beauty" and made them weaker in combat against male characters.

Konkin himself attempted to propose a new character archetype, the damsel, which he depicted as a chaste character in search of love, in the vein of a Disney Princess. Konkin's proposal was criticized for upholding gender stereotypes, in which chastity promoted the character to a "consort" while promiscuity demoted them to the role of "courtesan". He was also criticized for victim blaming in scenarios where the damsel is sexually assaulted, as he implied that suicide was a woman's only moral response. Writer Aaron Trammell described Konkin's proposal as an objectification of women because it defined them by their sexuality. Other D&D fans wrote to Konkin in objection to his character proposal, with many describing it as the work of a "male chauvinist pig" while one re-characterized it as satire. Trammell characterized the letters as an act of restorative justice, where the writers attempted to privately explain to Konkin the problems they had with the character, rather than publicly denouncing him.

== Political opinions ==
Konkin considered libertarianism radical. He was an initiator of the Agorist Institute.

Konkin rejected voting, believing it to be inconsistent with libertarian ethics. He likewise opposed involvement with the Libertarian Party, which he regarded as a statist co-option of libertarianism. He was an opponent of influential minarchist philosopher Robert Nozick, and referred to Nozick's devotees as "Nozis".

Konkin presents his strategy for achieving a libertarian society in his manifesto, New Libertarian Manifesto. Since he rejected voting and other means by which people typically attempt social change, he encouraged people to withdraw their consent from the state by devoting their economic activities to black market and grey market sources, which would not be taxed or regulated. Konkin called "transactions on these markets, as well as other activities that bypassed the State, 'counter-economics.' Peaceful transactions take place in a free market, or agora: hence his term 'agorism' for the society he sought to achieve."

Konkin was editor and publisher of the irregularly-produced New Libertarian Notes (1971–1975), the New Libertarian Weekly (1975–1978), and finally New Libertarian magazine (1978–1990), the last issue of which was a special science fiction tribute featuring a Robert A. Heinlein cover (issue 187, 1990).

Additionally, Konkin opposed wage labour, intellectual property, imperialism and interventionism.

=== Agorism ===
Konkin proposed a social political philosophy known as agorism, which advocates for a society in which all relations between people are voluntary exchanges by means of counter-economics, engaging with aspects of nonviolent revolution. Most agorists strictly oppose voting as a strategy for achieving their desired outcomes.

The goal of agorism is the agora ["αγορά" or "market" in Greek]. The society of the open marketplace as near to untainted by theft, assault, and fraud as can be humanly attained is as close to a free society as can be achieved. And a free society is the only one in which each and every one of us can satisfy his or her subjective values without crushing others' values by violence and coercion.

— Samuel Edward Konkin III

=== Accusations of historical revisionism ===
In her book Anarchism: Left, Right, and Green, political theorist and anarcho-syndicalist Ulrike Heider accused Konkin of endorsing historical negationism in his dealing with the Institute for Historical Review (IHR), at which he was a member of the board of directors; this included allotting advertisement space to the IHR in New Libertarian, and writing a positive review of James J. Martin's book on Raphael Lemkin, which was published by the IHR. Konkin personally rejected Holocaust denial, but defended the IHR because he believed its freedom of speech was being suppressed. However, Konkin's appraisal of Martin's book, specifically the second chapter (in which Martin labelled the claims of the mass murder of Jews as "a well coordinated and orchestrated propaganda assault") as "a summary of Martin's libertarian-revisionist views of the Second World War" and "the highlight of the book and a valuable booklet on its own" for "the libertarian and the hard-core revisionist", calls that framing into question.

== See also ==
- Victor Koman
- J. Neil Schulman
