= Revolutionary Wealth =

2006 book by Alvin and Heidi Toffler

- Cover of the hardcover edition
- Author: Alvin Toffler
- Language: English
- Subjects: Social Science, history, futurology
- Publisher: Knopf
- Publication date: 25 April 2006
- Publication place: United States
- Media type: Print (hardcover)
- Pages: 512 pp.
- ISBN: 0-375-40174-1

Revolutionary Wealth is a book written by futurists Alvin Toffler and his wife Heidi Toffler, first published in 2006 by Knopf. It is a continuation of The Third Wave (1980), which itself is a sequel to Future Shock (1970).

Revolutionary Wealth significantly expands on the Third Wave. As in the older volume, the book argues that institutions—public, private, and social—left over from an era of mass production are unsuited to a new civilization being built throughout the world. Only now, further detail is provided on what will constitute the Third Wave society.

== Deep Fundamentals ==
Toffler looks at the many ways the "Third Wave" is revolutionizing our relationships to three "deep fundamentals" and, therefore, to wealth systems in general.

- time relationships are being transformed with respect to the continually increasing amount of changes and synchronization required for businesses and individuals to accumulate wealth.
- space relationships are being transformed with respect to the former geographic limitations of market transactions. Never before has it been possible for businesses and individuals to accumulate wealth from around the globe with the ease that today's internet brings.
- knowledge relationships are being transformed with respect to availability. As Toffler states, never before have we been able to instantly access virtually unlimited amounts of any kind of information for virtually zero cost. Unlike the foundations of past wealth revolutions, the Third Wave's foundation defies traditional economics in that knowledge is not scarce; knowledge is infinite and exponentiates itself. An economy based on knowledge also defies classical economics due to the non-rival property of knowledge.

Two important elements, absent from The Third Wave, are (1) the explicit tie-in to Cyberspace and the surge of new technologies that have cropped up since the time of The Third Wave (e.g. YouTube, social networking, cyber-economies, the Internet, itself, etc.), (2) the beginnings of an account of just what kind of economy may come to replace the monetary system.

The authors go as far as toying with the idea of a world without money, raising (probably for the first time) a third kind of economic transaction that is neither one-on-one barter nor monetary exchange. In the end, they settle on the idea that the newer non-monetary economy (the one first termed the "prosumer economy" in the 1980 volume) will exist side-by-side with the monetary sector in the near term, though the latter may come to be eclipsed by the former over the long term.

Both the name of the book and the term "Deep Fundamentals" refer to the shifting of the much deeper layer that lies at the foundation of all monetary economies, both capitalist and socialist. What both The Third Wave and Revolutionary Wealth call into question is the very premise of monetary exchange.

Other elements are brought up in the 2006 volume which were notably absent from the 1980 volume and even the 1990 sequel Powershift. The question of world political unification is returned to: here, the authors make clear that the idea itself is not being dismissed, but rather the notion that such a unification will be a united states of the presently-existing nation-states, e.g. world government. As they point out, there are other kinds of entities (religious organizations, NGOs, businesses, labor unions) that would have to be included in a world as heterogeneous as ours.

More significantly, the idea of a mass settlement into outer space is finally entertained.
