= Anticipatory democracy =

Anticipatory democracy is a theory of civics relying on democratic decision making that takes into account predictions of future events that have some credibility with the electorate. The phrase was coined by Alvin Toffler in his book Future Shock and was expanded on in the 1978 book Anticipatory Democracy, edited by Clement Bezold.

Other well-known advocates of the anticipatory approach include Newt Gingrich, Heidi Toffler, K. Eric Drexler, and Robin Hanson. They all advocate approaches in which the public, not just experts, participates in this "anticipation."

The FutureMAP program of the Information Awareness Office program of the United States government proposed a prediction market before it was canceled on July 29, 2003.

== Variants ==
Bioregional democracy can appear as a variant of anticipatory democracy in that it anticipates (using a similar scientific process) the ecological health outcomes of any given action. However, it usually relies more on far less fragile means and less on compared measures and quantities.

An alternative, deliberative democracy, may combine with either the anticipatory or the bioregional model. It relies less on formal models and a market system for betting on future events and more on discussion.

Deliberative, anticipatory, and bioregional approaches can all be considered variants of participatory democracy with different thresholds of ease of participation, legal burden of proof, concern for non-human life or future generations, and reflection of participants' tolerances versus preferences or ideals of truth. A deliberative model may be considered a left-leaning model, and an anticipatory one is right-wing. Those who wish to avoid this debate and see merits to both approaches (e.g., Greens, who usually prefer the generic term "participatory democracy"). This term has become fundamental to green politics itself.

Other terms that likewise have more specific associations with advocates or methods include grassroots democracy, semi-direct democracy, consensus democracy.

== See also ==
- Democracy (varieties)
- List of politics-related topics

== Bibliography ==
- Future Shock - Alvin Toffler
- Anticipatory Democracy: People in the Politics of the Future, Clement Bezold, Random House, 1978. ISBN 0-394-41236-2.
