= Thrice Upon a Time =

1980 novel by James P. Hogan

Thrice Upon A Time
- First edition cover.
- Author: James P. Hogan
- Cover artist: Rowena Morrill
- Language: English
- Subject: Time travel
- Genre: Hard science fiction
- Publisher: Del Rey Books
- Publication date: March 1980
- ISBN: 978-0-345-32386-6
- OCLC: 6205441
- Preceded by: The Two Faces of Tomorrow
- Followed by: Giants' Star

Thrice Upon A Time is a science fiction novel by British writer James P. Hogan, first published in 1980. Unlike most other time travel stories, Thrice Upon A Time considers the ramifications of sending messages into the past and/or receiving messages from the future, rather than the sending of physical objects through time.

== Plot summary ==
In December 2009, Murdoch Ross and his friend Lee Francis Walker visit Murdoch's grandfather, Sir Charles Ross, in his castle in Storbannon, Scotland. Sir Charles is a Nobel Prize winner for his work in particle physics — more specifically the isolation of free quarks.

In this novel, when a nucleon decays into three quarks, the first two quarks appear immediately and the third quark appears on the order of a few millionths of an yoctosecond later. A widely accepted theory is that the original decay produces two quarks and also a third unknown particle, dubbed the "quason". This is subsequently transformed into a third quark.

Sir Charles offers a different and radical explanation: all three of the quarks are created at once, but the first two are "propagated back in time". Charles dubs the energy which had allowed the propagation through time as "tau waves". Although his theory is seemingly valid and consistent, the physicists of his time refuse to accept it because of its implications — namely the failure of some of the physical laws of conservation. Sir Charles then retreats to his family's castle in Scotland to continue his research in private. There, he succeeds in building a time machine capable of sending messages to the future and the past.

When the two young men arrive, Sir Charles takes them down into the basement, where the machine is found. As they enter the basement, a computer attached to the machine produces data on a sheet of paper, which Sir Charles hides from the other men. He asks Murdoch to type in a six-character random message into the computer. Sir Charles next activates his machine and transmits the message one minute back in time. Finally, he shows the paper printed out previously, and Murdoch and Lee are amazed: the printout contained exactly the same random characters that Murdoch typed, and these were printed before Murdoch had typed them in.

After Murdoch and Lee have gotten over their initial amazement, they decide to experiment with the machine. Murdoch tries to fool the machine into creating a causality paradox, by deliberately receiving a message from the future, and not sending the message back at the due time. Suddenly, the entire system turns bizarre, and they are flooded with messages from all over the ten-minute range of the machine. Then they abruptly turn off the machine and leave.

While outside, Murdoch and Lee talk about the implications of the machine's existence and how the space-time continuum could allow for time travel without introducing a paradox. They formulate theories similar to the many-worlds interpretation, finally deciding that none of the theories they discuss fit their previous observations.

The next day, Ted Cartland, a friend of Charles and a former Royal Air Force officer, arrives to examine the machine he had helped build. They repeat the experiment, and Ted is bewildered as well. Ted, however, has a trick up his sleeve. He writes a computer program to do what Murdoch had done the day before, to remove the human element from the experiment.

The machine picks up an unexpected message, telling the experimenters that a glass jar had been broken. True enough, Lee was on the verge of accidentally pushing a jar off a shelf. However, they are unable to contact their future selves with the broken jar, since they apparently no longer exist. Sir Charles decides that upon sending the message back, the copies of themselves in the future had changed their past and thus had been erased from existence. The altered timeline, with its unbroken jar, overwrote the old one rather like recording over an old TV program on a videotape. Thus causality had been preserved. The fear of being erased chills them, and so they quickly disable the machine again.

As time goes by, they establish an experimental protocol, and they set up automated tests to gain more information about the physics behind the machine. The machine is upgraded to allow for more data throughput and a time range of about 24 hours. Murdoch also meets a young woman named Anne Patterson when she trips over Sir Charles's kitten while she was out shopping in Kingussie.

They immediately fall in love. It turns out later that she is a physicist at the site of the new fusion reactor in Burghead. Elizabeth Muir, another close friend of Sir Charles, works there as well, and he invites her to his castle to investigate the peculiar machine.

=== Burghead and black holes ===
The (fictional) European Fusion Consortium (EFC) has commissioned a large thermonuclear fusion reactor in Burghead to compete with the technologies located in the United States and the Soviet Union. The colossal energy obtained from fusion meant that huge amounts of power might someday be available at low costs. All three parties used inertial confinement technology, with the EFC opting to use ion beams.

During this time, Murdoch and Lee get to tour the large Burghead facility through Elizabeth, who is a principal physicist there, and Murdoch builds a relationship with Anne. One day, while still in the testing phases of power production, the reactor is shut down when apparent erosion is detected in the fusion chamber. Two days before, the team at Storbannon had experienced an apparent failure in its time machine, with Lee asserting that the failure had to be due to interference.

Their time machine then suddenly resumes operation again, and they elect to ignore the problem. Shortly after the incident, strange events start occurring around the world, with so-called bugophants (a blend of bug and elephant) drilling tiny, long, straight holes through a myriad of objects, from human bodies to telescope mirrors.

Finally, the team finds out the cause of the erosion in the Burghead plant, the interference with the machine, and the bugophants themselves: the repeated fusion tests at the plant had, over the course of two days, produced some two million microscopic black holes, which then tunnelled through the basement of the plant and concentrated around the core of the Earth. As the black holes annihilated matter, they emitted tau waves and caused interference even before the reactor tests. Although conventional theory stated that black holes could not form from the comparatively low pressure produced in the reactor, and small black holes could not survive long anyway, the conventional theory had failed to take into account the existence of tau waves and their effects.

Lee suddenly goes into spasms and loses consciousness during a dinner with Murdoch and Anne. He is rushed to a local hospital, and then he is transferred to a special unit created to deal with a new outbreak, which had apparently affected him and several others in Burghead.

While the rest of the team is away, Murdoch finds that the machine is about to be swamped with interference, and may soon be unusable. He decides to take matters into his own hands and transmit a message far back into the past to remedy the situation. To get around the 24-hour limit of the machine, he asks Anne, who had learned machine code programming at her university, to write a program that would repeatedly bootstrap itself back in time until it reached the date desired. Anne complies, despite her deep misgivings. They manage to send the message, knowing they will be reset into the new timeline, and that anything could be different.

Their selves in the past receive the message, and they act on it immediately. They have no choice but to tell the bewildered managing committee at Burghead of their findings, including revealing their time machine. Given the necessary investigations, the thermonuclear reactor is shut down indefinitely. And although neither Murdoch nor Anne is aware of it, the flood of tau particles accompanying the message upset delicate quantum probabilities. She did not trip over the kitten and then begin a relationship with Murdoch.

=== Centurion ===
In the new timeline, word of the time machine spreads to the EFC headquarters in Brussels and to other places. Lee turns ill in the castle one day and suddenly collapses. As a doctor, Anne contacts Murdoch, who is away, and suggests that Lee has succumbed to a new outbreak of a disease, apparently a version of multiple sclerosis, but progressing much faster, taking only a few weeks rather than years, and also very deadly.

Murdoch pressures Anne to reveal more information about the outbreak, which appears to be highly classified. Anne does not know much, either. However, Murdoch finds out that a distinguished medical specialist, Sir Giles Fennimore, has arrived from London to investigate the outbreak. He learns that the disease is somehow connected to the West Coast of the United States, where Lee had been residing in September 2009, and his suspicions are raised further.

Ted and Elizabeth help Murdoch investigate. After interrogating Ralph Courtney, chairman at the Burghead facility, and a chance meeting by Ted with a young R.A.F. pilot, they eventually find out (Ted knowing much of this from his previous R.A.F. experience) that Anglo-American authorities had wished to establish an advanced laboratory for potentially dangerous research into viruses, genetic manipulation, and similar subjects. Naturally, this project stirred up a large controversy over public fears of containment failures and contamination and was eventually scrapped. However, the possible scientific advancements offered were simply too great to pass up. Thus a satellite, the QX-37, was constructed and launched into outer space, purporting to be an astronomical observatory. The QX-37 continued the experiments secretly.

In August 2009, the satellite passed right through the path of the Perseids meteor shower, and it was hit by a meteor. It broke up and disintegrated into the Earth's atmosphere. After the breakup and fallout, to prevent public panic, the entire effort was tightly classified and codenamed Centurion. Again, surpassing the odds, a single mutant strain of multiple sclerosis survives on its way back to the Earth, and infects the entire population of the West Coast, with an incubation period of nine months. It was during this time that Lee was infected, since he was on the West Coast at the time.

The West Coast of the United States is one of the most densely populated areas on the planet, and soon thousands of people start reporting symptoms and being hospitalized. The new strain is named omnisclerosis Californians. A vaccine is announced and vaccinations begin in California. However they are stopped after 811 of the people treated die from neurological disorders triggered by one of the production batches, which had not been manufactured properly. Even though the vaccine worked, members of the public would not trust it anymore, and there are now left with no defense against the virus.

The members of the team decide to contact Fennimore through the Minister of Advanced Technology and Science Graham Cuthrie. Although he is initially skeptical, he is convinced of the machine's authenticity after a demonstration. They propose a pilot test: instead of changing many months of history, they offer to reset the events leading to the vaccine mishaps that had caused Fennimore much distress, five days ago. Cuthrie reluctantly agrees. He is asked to prepare a comprehensive document detailing the manufacturing problem, with additional measures taken to ensure its authenticity.

In the new reset timeline, the faulty vaccine batch is retracted and the 811 deaths do not occur. Fennimore becomes a spokesman for the team, convincing world governments to take action. It is decided that the information needed to produce and distribute the vaccine will be sent back several months in time, as well as other current events, to help their past selves to make better decisions.

=== Epilogue ===
The message is sent to the afternoon of January 16, 2010, from July 28, 2010, shortly after the message about the black holes is received. The message is split up into two parts, a header announcing the message, and then the message body itself to arrive an hour later, to allow the team to attach more computer memory to the machine for the message to be received completely.

That very day, in this third iteration of the timeline, Murdoch and Lee go out shopping in Kingussie, and a certain young woman named Anne trips over Sir Charles's kitten... This is the origin of the story's title, Thrice Upon A Time.

== Reception ==
Greg Costikyan reviewed Thrice Upon a Time in Ares Magazine #3 and commented that "Thrice Upon a Time for its faults is still a book rich in ideas."

== Reviews ==
- Review by Bob Mecoy (1980) in Future Life, August 1980
- Review by Tom Easton (1980) in Analog Science Fiction/Science Fact, October 1980
- Review by Gene DeWeese (1980) in Science Fiction Review, Winter 1980

== Real World ==
A paper published in March 2011 suggests a theory similar to the one underlying the plot of this novel—and directly connected to the Large Hadron Collider, mentioned above—but using the Higgs singlet (a companion to the Higgs boson) to carry information back in time.

== See also ==
- Timescape, by Gregory Benford
- Steins;Gate
