= The Genesis Machine =

1978 science fiction novel by James P. Hogan

- First edition
- Author: James P. Hogan
- Cover artist: Darrell K. Sweet
- Language: English
- Genre: Science fiction
- Publisher: Del Rey Books
- Publication date: April 1978
- Publication place: United States
- Media type: Print (Hardcover and Paperback)
- Pages: 299
- ISBN: 0-345-27231-5

The Genesis Machine is a 1978 science fiction novel by James P. Hogan.

== Background ==
Hogan discussed the background of the novel in his essay "Discovering Hyperspace". While developing the setting for Inherit the Stars, Hogan found himself dissatisfied with the use of superluminal travel in science fiction as a plot device, in particular finding that he could not think of a story where the invention of the hyperdrive is central to the plot. The idea for the novel arose when he combined this idea with the concept that the hyperdrive would emerge as a byproduct of other research, in this case military research into superweapon technology.

== Summary ==
The protagonist Bradley Clifford is a scientist drafted into military research for the American government. Finding the establishment repressive, he leaves and forms a team to develop his methods to create a means of controlling gravity. As this research is also of military importance, the team soon find themselves back under state control. They reluctantly agree to use their methods to create a new and devastating super weapon, though Clifford's ultimate product, while indeed being capable of producing a devastating quantity of energy, is designed with a less mercenary ambition: to give humanity the stars and permanently prevent the use of the new super weapons.

== Reception ==
John Clute characterised the book as playing to Hogan's strengths, in particular "his hard-edged sense of how scientists think."

Kirkus Reviews was mixed in its reception, complaining that "[t]he style often suffers from ... tone-deafness, and the political analysis is not penetrating enough to support all the noises of moral outrage" but concluded that "Hogan succeeds where so many science-fiction writers fail: in creating and skillfully developing a scientific premise with enough teeth in it to be a source of pleasure rather than embarrassment."

The Genesis Machine won the Seiun Award for Best Foreign Language Novel of the Year in 1982.
