= Chryse =

Chryse (Greek: Χρύση, Khrýsē) may refer to:

== Ancient Greece and Rome ==
- Chryse (mythology), several figures in Greek mythology
- Chryse (ancient Greek placename), various places in ancient Greek geography
- Chryse, Greek name for Aurea of Ostia (died mid-3rd century), Christian martyr and saint in the Roman Empire
- Chryse and Argyre, a pair of legendary islands, mentioned by ancient writers

== Other uses ==
- Chryse Planitia, a plain on Mars
- Chryse, a fictional planet in the novel The Legend That Was Earth
- Chryse Autonomous Region, a city on Mars in the anime Mobile Suit Gundam: Iron-Blooded Orphans

== See also ==
- Chryses, father of Chryseis
- Chryses (mythology), various mythological figures named Chryses
