= Confessional society =

Confessional society describes the emerging trend of people to share daily life and thoughts with strangers through new information and communication tools. The term has been coined by Polish sociologist Zygmunt Bauman. He defined it as a society which is 'notorious for effacing the boundary which once separated the private from the public'. One of the examples used by Bauman is the social media platform Facebook, which he likens to an online "confessional… where inner-truths [about its users] are revealed"; he also described mobile phones and similar portable communication devices as "portable electronic confessionals".

Bauman sees this a form of a pervasive marketing strategy in which consumers became producers, and are encouraged by social media platforms to advertise or market themselves to others, to increase their own visibility (and corresponding platform visibility and ad revenue). In the modern society, therefore, fame and celebrity status, associated with and sometimes achieved through extreme display of one's private life on the Internet, are "an ultimate goal or dream" for many, although Bauman at the same time observes that such a summary risks oversimplification of a more nuanced system. The concept of the marketing society has been analyzed in the context of market research studies, with David Beer observing this trend means that increasingly, people are sharing data about themselves that previously, marketing companies had to struggle to acquire, and concluding that "If Bauman’s vision is correct, then the market researcher operating in this confessional society will be researching people marketing themselves." In 2013 Beer would describe the term "confessional society" as "increasingly influential".
