= The Third Wave (Toffler book) =

1980 book by Alvin Toffler

- First edition
- Author: Alvin Toffler
- Language: English
- Subjects: Social science, history, futurology
- Publisher: William Morrow (US)
- Publication date: 1980
- Publication place: United States
- Media type: Print (hard and paperback)
- ISBN: 0-517-32719-8 (hardcover), ISBN 0-553-24698-4 (paperback)
- Preceded by: Future Shock
- Followed by: Powershift

The Third Wave is a 1980 book by Alvin Toffler. It is the sequel to Future Shock (1970), it is followed by Powershift: Knowledge, Wealth and Violence at the Edge of the 21st Century in 1990.

Toffler's book describes the transition in developed countries from Industrial Age society, which he calls the "Second Wave", to Information Age "Third Wave" society which he gives many predictions about.

== Toffler's wave theory ==
In the book Toffler describes three types of societies, based on the concept of 'waves'—each wave pushes the older societies and cultures aside. The First Wave is the settled agricultural society which prevailed in much of the world after the Neolithic Revolution, which replaced hunter-gatherer cultures. The Second Wave is Industrial Age society. The Second Wave began in Western Europe with the Industrial Revolution, and subsequently spread across the world. Key aspects of Second Wave society are the nuclear family, a factory-type education system and the corporation. Toffler writes:

The Second Wave Society is industrial and based on mass production, mass distribution, mass consumption, mass education, mass media, mass recreation, mass entertainment, and weapons of mass destruction. You combine those things with standardization, centralization, concentration, and synchronization, and you wind up with a style of organization we call bureaucracy.

The Third Wave is the post-industrial society. Toffler says that since the late 1950s most countries have been transitioning from a Second Wave society into a Third Wave society. He coined many words to describe it and mentions names invented by others, such as the Information Age.

== Key characteristics of the third wave society ==
Though the society foreseen is still emerging, several distinguishing features were posed as characteristic of this new society. Toffler predicts a rolling back of the Industrial-Era creed of "standardization", as exemplified in the one-size-fits-all approach typical of institutions of the second wave, such as the education system, factories, governments, mass media, and high volume mass production.

Toffler also predicts attacks on the nation-state from above and below and progressive obsolescence of the nation-state itself. These may include a gradual loss of people's willingness to use the nation-state to solve problems, the rise of regional interests. Third Wave mentions an expected transformation of the democratic information exchange from periodic polling toward a more direct and frequent interaction between the government and its populace. Toffler begins to indicate that knowledge and information rather than industrial capacity will be the primary determinant of power and its distribution. This is discussed more fully in the sequel Powershift.

His concept of an "electronic cottage" where a large demographic works from home using fast communication devices to interact with the economy. These individuals are termed "prosumers" when they both produce and consume a product. An example, not included in the book, is individuals who work from home, purchase solar panels, and then use the electricity they generate to produce goods they sell. Discussing the book in a later interview, Toffler said that industrial-style, centralized, top-down bureaucratic planning would be replaced by a more open, democratic, decentralized style which he called "anticipatory democracy".

== Kim Dae-jung ==
While imprisoned under military rule in South Korea, the future president of South Korea, Kim Dae-jung was handed this book by his wife. In his autobiography, Kim said The Third Wave was the inspiration that gave him a dream of making Korea an "ICT (information and communications technology) powerhouse". Today, South Korea's cyberinfrastructure is considered to be his great legacy.

== Reviews ==
The book was reviewed by Maciej Parowski for Polish magazine "Fantastyka" (3/87, p.53).
