= War and Anti-War =

War and Anti-War is a 1993 book by the futurist Alvin Toffler and his wife Heidi Toffler. The topic of the book is the future of war.
