= Code of the Lifemaker =

1983 science fiction novel by James P. Hogan

- First edition (publ. Del Rey/Ballantine); Cover art by David B. Mattingly
- Author: James P. Hogan
- Publisher: Del Rey Books / Ballantine Books
- Publication date: January 1, 1983
- ISBN: 978-0-345-30925-9
- Followed by: The Immortality Option (1995)

Code of the Lifemaker is a 1983 novel by British science fiction author James P. Hogan. NASA's report Advanced Automation for Space Missions was the direct inspiration for this novel detailing first contact between Earth explorers and the Taloids, clanking replicators who have colonized Saturn's moon Titan.

A sequel titled The Immortality Option was published in 1995.

== Plot summary ==
About 1,000,000 B.C., an unidentified alien race sent out robotic factories to many worlds in their part of the galaxy to prepare for future settlement. One of those factory ships suffers severe radiation damage from a near-miss by a supernova and goes off course, drifting in space for a hundred thousand years before landing on the Saturnian moon Titan. Due to a malfunction in its database, it begins producing imperfect copies that begin to evolve on their own. (The description of this background is presented in a prologue that proved sufficiently popular among readers that it was later anthologized on its own in a collection of Hogan's short fiction.) The resulting machine ecosystem eventually gives rise to humanoid robots with human-like intellects, who develop a civilization similar to early civilization of Earth. Almost all of them have reverence for their mythical creator, a being they call the "Lifemaker".

Early in the 21st century, the North Atlantic Space Organization (combining NASA and NATO) dispatched the Orion with a cover story of terraforming Mars for human habitation. Karl Zambendorf, a con artist who is present on this expedition to verify ESP over interplanetary distances, prematurely learns that the Orion and its crew of researchers is headed for Titan, where the discovery of the Taloids has been kept need-to-know on Earth.

When the Orion arrives, the first landing party sets down in a freethinking state where Thirg, a Taloid who was cast out of his home state Kroaxia, has fled. They are mistaken for the Lifemaker because they have come from the sky, which the Taloids cannot see out of due to Titan's atmosphere. But Thirg becomes more discerning as he and the humans begin to understand more of each other's speech. Thirg's brother Groork has come from Kroaxia to apprehend him, but Zambendorf intercepts him and sends him back to Kroaxia as a prophet.

Zambendorf learned that NASO plans to exploit Titan's natural resources and use the Taloids to build the factories they need, reducing them to slaves. The NASO business administrators on the Orion are already in agreement with the Kroaxian government to use human (the Taloids call humans "Lumians" because they glow brightly in their infrared vision) weapons to conquer Titan, believing the Kroaxian leadership buttressed by priests will be the easiest to control. Zambendorf, in his unanticipated role as Messenger for the Lifemaker, has given Groork guidelines akin to the Ten Commandments for his people to prevent a war from starting. "All Taloids are brothers" and "No Taloid is to enslave or be a slave" does not sit well with the ruling establishment of Kroaxia, and Groork is saved by the Orion crew not working for NASO. There will be use of Titan's resources, but the partnership between humans and Taloids will be one of equals.

== Reception ==
Dave Langford reviewed Code of the Lifemaker for White Dwarf #73, and stated that "Lifemaker never comes to terms with its own absurdity, but if you survive the stodgy opening it has its charms."

== Reviews ==
- Review by Dan Chow (1983) in Locus, #269 June 1983
- Review by Chris Henderson (1983) in Dragon Magazine, November 1983
- Review by Robert Coulson (1983) in Amazing Science Fiction, November 1983
- Review by Tom Easton (1983) in Analog Science Fiction/Science Fact, December 1983
- Review by Baird Searles (1983) in Isaac Asimov's Science Fiction Magazine, December 1983
- Review by Don D'Ammassa (1984) in Science Fiction Chronicle, #61 October 1984
- Review by W. Ritchie Benedict (1984) in Thrust, #21, Fall 1984/Winter 1985
- Review by Ken Lake (1986) in Paperback Inferno, #60
- Review [French] by Hervé Hauck (1990) in A&A, #132

== See also ==
- Self-replicating machines in fiction
