= Realtime Interrupt =

1995 novel by James P. Hogan

- First edition
- Author: James P. Hogan
- Cover artist: Peter Gudynas
- Language: English
- Genre: Novel
- Publisher: Bantam Books
- Publication date: 1995
- Publication place: United States
- Media type: Print (Paperback)
- Pages: 324 pp
- ISBN: 0-553-37454-0
- OCLC: 30892721
- Dewey Decimal: 823/.914 20
- LC Class: PR6058.O348 R4 1995

Realtime Interrupt is a 1995 science fiction novel by James P. Hogan set in a near-future Pittsburgh, Pennsylvania, United States.

It tells the story of Joe Corrigan, who awakens in a Pittsburgh hospital without memory. As director of the supersecret Oz Project, he had worked on a virtual reality software project, and as he slowly recalls his past, he sets out on a quest to pick up the pieces of his past life. He discovers that the virtual reality is still going on.

== Simulated reality ==
- Simulated reality
