= Voyage from Yesteryear =

1982 novel by James P. Hogan

- First edition
- Author: James P. Hogan
- Cover artist: Tom Miller
- Language: English
- Genre: Science fiction
- Publisher: Nelson Doubleday
- Publication date: April 1982
- Publication place: United States
- Media type: Print (Hardcover and Paperback)
- Pages: 377
- ISBN: 0-345-29472-6

Voyage from Yesteryear is a 1982 science fiction novel by British writer James P. Hogan.

== Origins ==
According to Hogan, the idea for the book originated around 1976 when he was asked by a friend about whether there was a solution to "the Troubles" in Northern Ireland. He said that there was no solution that he could see and that the only thing that might work was separating the children and the adults to prevent the prejudices from being taught at an early age. However, some years later he returned to the concept of a society free from conditioning, which formed part of the basis for Voyage from Yesteryear.

== Plot summary ==
The story opens early in the 21st century, as an automated space probe is being prepared for a mission to explore habitable exoplanets in the Alpha Centauri system. However, Earth appears destined for a global war which the probe designers fear that humanity may not survive. It appears that the only chance for the human species is to reestablish itself far away from the conflict but there is no time left for a crewed expedition to escape Earth. The team, led by Henry B. Congreve, change their mission priority and quickly modify the design to carry several hundred sets of electronically coded human genetic data. Also included in this mission of embryo space colonization is a databank of human knowledge, robots to convert the data into genetic material and care for the children and construct habitats when the destination is reached, and a number of artificial wombs. The probe's designers name it the Kuan-Yin after the bodhisattva of childbirth and compassion.

Shortly after the launch, global war indeed breaks out and several decades later, Earthbound humanity is united under an authoritarian government. It is this government that receives a radio message from the fledgling "Chironian" civilization revealing that the probe found a habitable planet (Chiron) and that the first generation of children have been raised successfully.

As the surviving power blocs of Earth before the conflict are still evident, North America, Europe and Asia each send a generation ship to Alpha Centauri to take control of the colony. By the time that the first generation ship (the American Mayflower II) arrives after 20 years, Chironian society is in its fifth generation.

The Mayflower II has brought with it thousands of settlers, all the trappings of the authoritarian regime along with bureaucracy, religion, fascism and a military presence to keep the population in line. However, the planners behind the generation ship did not anticipate the direction that Chironian society took: in the absence of conditioning and with limitless robotic labor and fusion power, Chiron has become a post-scarcity economy. Money and material possessions are meaningless to the Chironians and social standing is determined by individual talent, which has resulted in a wealth of art and technology without any hierarchies, central authority or armed conflict.

In an attempt to crush this anarchist adhocracy, the Mayflower II government employs every available method of control; however, in the absence of conditioning the Chironians are not even capable of comprehending the methods, let alone bowing to them. The Chironians simply use methods similar to Gandhi's satyagraha and other forms of nonviolent resistance to win over most of the Mayflower II crew members, who had never previously experienced true freedom, and isolate the die-hard authoritarians.

Frustrated with their lack of success, the authoritarian faction stages a military coup on board the Mayflower II and launches the ship's heavily armed "battle module", threatening to attack unless they submit to a military dictatorship. Having isolated the authoritarians, the Chironians destroy the module with an antimatter particle beam weapon. The remainder of the crew dissolve their government and join Chironian society. The week after, the laser communications beam to the Mayflower II cuts off, having been destroyed in another global war that had taken place 4.5 years ago.

The epilogue is set five years after these events and shows that the Chironians also assimilated the crews of the Asian and European starships. Now united, the Chironians refit and recommission the Mayflower II with an advanced antimatter drive and rename it the Henry B. Congreve. The Henry B. Congreve is sent back to Earth to rebuild human civilization (with the new drive, this journey will only take eight years), fulfilling the Kuan-Yin's mission of preserving humanity.

== Reception and influences ==
Dave Langford reviewed Voyage from Yesteryear for White Dwarf #57, and stated that "Solid and quite worthy stuff, but practically devoid of characterization."

Colin Greenland reviewed Voyage from Yesteryear for Imagine magazine, and stated that "The clash of worlds is a clash of world-views, the peaceful anarchy of Chiron against the new authoritarian regimes of Earth. It's unfortunate Hogan couldn't have made it just a little less obvious which side's going to win."

Much of the reaction to the novel has been related to the creation of the Chironian society. Ken MacLeod praised the "attractive and ... plausible depiction of a communist anarchy" while John Clute compared it with the work of Eric Frank Russell. The strong libertarian themes in the novel led to it winning the Prometheus Award in 1983, the first of Hogan's two wins.

Hogan's essay "What Really Brought Down Communism?" explains the reception given to the book in the Soviet Union. In the mid-1980s, Hogan was informed that the novel had been serialized in a Polish science fiction magazine Fantastyka, and, in the absence of a functioning exchange mechanism, paid for it in Polish złotys credited to an account taken out in Hogan's name. The story was republished in other Eastern European countries where its depiction of nonviolent resistance against authority proved popular. In 1989, Hogan attended a convention in Kraków before travelling to Warsaw to meet the publishers of the magazine serial and draw out the money he had been paid. However, inflation following the collapse of the communist regime had reduced the value of the money in the account to just $8.43. Hogan concluded: "So after the U.S. had spent trillions on its B-52s, Trident submarines, NSA, CIA, and the rest, that was my tab for toppling the Soviet empire. There's always an easy way if you just look."
