= The Proteus Operation =

1985 science fiction novel by James P. Hogan

- First edition
- Author: James P. Hogan
- Cover artist: Bob Larkin and Jim Warren
- Language: English
- Genre: Alternate history
- Publisher: Spectra
- Publication date: 1985
- Publication place: United States
- Media type: Print (Hardcover)
- Pages: 403 (first edition)
- ISBN: 978-0-553-05095-0

The Proteus Operation is a science fiction alternate history novel written by James P. Hogan. The plot focuses on an Anglo-American team of soldiers and civilians sent back in time from the Nazi-dominated world of 1975 to prevent an Axis victory in World War II that was engineered by more advanced time travelers from the 21st century.

Historical figures in the book include Isaac Asimov, Wilhelm Canaris, Winston Churchill, Duff Cooper, Anthony Eden, Albert Einstein, Enrico Fermi, Reinhard Heydrich, Adolf Hitler, Heinrich Himmler, John F. Kennedy, Frederick Lindemann, George Pegram, Franklin D. Roosevelt, Leo Szilard, and Edward Teller. Of these, only Asimov and Teller were still alive when the novel was published in 1985.

== Plot ==
After the Great War, humanity, shaken by the horrors of the war, adopts a "Never Again" spirit in the 1920s that leads to greater internationalism and cooperation between global alliances and blocs. By the 2020s, the League of Nations oversees a peaceful, cooperative world. However, dissent grows among sections of the aristocracy and corporate elite, who believe the increased equality and cooperation over the past century have taken their opportunities to lead luxurious, hedonistic lives at the top of society. The "Uptime" initiative forms among these elites to develop a time machine to travel back 100 years and alter history to create an oligopolist timeline where they rule unopposed. They identify the Soviet Union as their greatest enemy and the Nazi Party, a fledgling German fascist movement that fell apart after the 1923 Beer Hall Putsch, as the perfect tool for defeating them.

The Uptime initiative sends 21st century advisors, armaments, and nuclear weapons back to the 1920s to support the Nazis and enable Adolf Hitler's rise to power. With help from his time-traveling sponsors, Hitler exploits knowledge about the original timeline to swiftly defeat the Western Allies, and uses provided nuclear weapons against the Soviet Union, winning World War II. However, he then destroys his end of the "time conduit" and declares independence from his former sponsors. By 1975, Nazi Germany and the Empire of Japan have conquered everything other than North America, Australasia, and parts of South America. Africa has suffered an enormous genocide every bit as complete as the one inflicted upon the Jews, and the Axis powers stand poised to start a final war that the remaining Allies, led by the United States, are bound to lose.

In this Nazi-dominated 1975, the Allies discover the true cause of the Nazi successes and decides to build its own time machine to prevent the Axis victory. This 1975 time machine is not as advanced or powerful as the original 2020s time machine and is only able to reach 1939. The plan is to establish a military alliance between the 1975 America of President John F. Kennedy and the 1939 America of President Franklin D. Roosevelt.

While in 1939, the 1975 agents start noticing that events they had no hand in are different (such as the Joe Louis versus John Henry Lewis fight and the death of Pope Pius XI), and with Albert Einstein's help they discover that all possible outcomes already exist and that all time travel does is create links between one of these other outcomes. Realizing why things have gone wrong, the 1975 agents, cut off in 1939, attempt to keep the Allies intact while working to close off Hitler's gateway to the alternate 2020s before he gets the knowledge and weapons to win the war.

In the end, the agents succeed, and this second timeline they create turns out to be our real world. They also realize that the United States of their Nazi-dominated timeline knew they could not change their situation, and was instead planning to escape to our timeline in the same way the 2020s elites hoped to escape to theirs. To prevent any further incursions and timeline alterations, they have the gateway destroyed.

== See also ==
- Axis victory in World War II (an extensive list of other Wikipedia articles regarding works of Nazi Germany/Axis/World War II alternate history)
