= James P. Hogan (writer) =

British science fiction author (1941–2010)

James Patrick Hogan
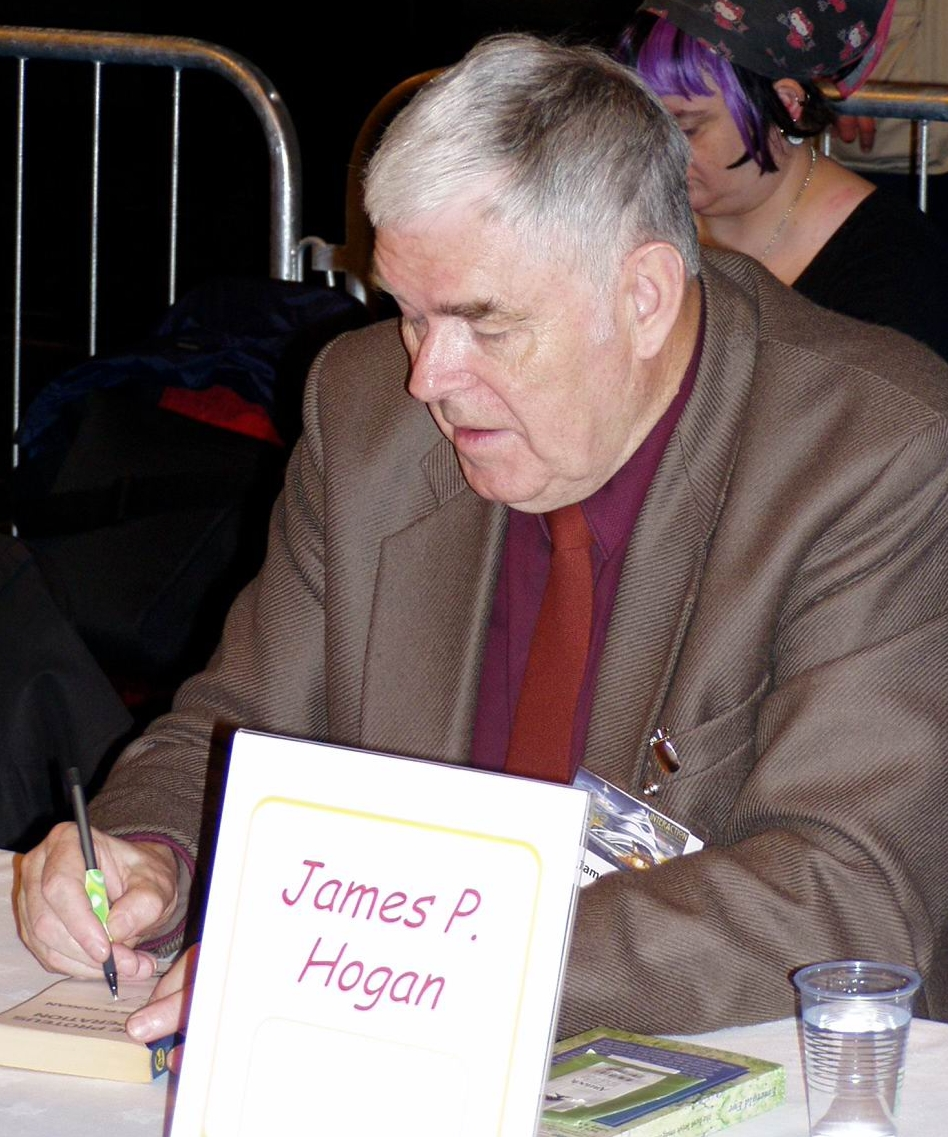
- At the 63rd World Science Fiction Convention in Glasgow, August 2005.
- Born: James Patrick Hogan; 27 June 1941; London, England
- Died: 12 July 2010 (aged 69); Dromahaire, County Leitrim, Ireland

James Patrick Hogan (27 June 1941 – 12 July 2010) was a British science fiction author. His major works include the Giants series of five novels published between 1977 and 2005.

== Biography ==
Hogan was born in London, England. He was raised in the Portobello Road area on the west side of London. After leaving school at the age of sixteen, he worked various odd jobs until, after receiving a scholarship, he began a five-year program at the Royal Aircraft Establishment at Farnborough studying the practice and theory of electrical, electronic, and mechanical engineering. He was married four times and fathered six children.

Hogan worked as a design engineer for several companies and eventually began working with sales during the 1960s, traveling around Europe as a sales engineer for Honeywell. During the 1970s he joined the Digital Equipment Corporation's Laboratory Data Processing Group and during 1977 relocated to Boston, Massachusetts to manage its sales training program. He published his first novel, Inherit The Stars, during the same year to win an office bet.

He quit DEC during 1979 and began writing full-time, relocating to Orlando, Florida, for a year where he met his third wife Jackie. They later relocated to Sonora, California.

During his later years, Hogan adopted a number of contrarian opinions. He was a proponent of Immanuel Velikovsky's version of catastrophism, arguing Velikovsky's critics were part of "an entrenched priesthood" who refused to seriously examine Velikovsky even when some of his predictions were validated (such as Venus's extremely high surface temperature which was contrary to prevailing scientific opinion in the 1950s); and as of 1999 Hogan accepted the Peter Duesberg hypothesis that AIDS is caused by pharmaceutical use rather than HIV (see AIDS denialism). He criticized the idea of the gradualism of evolution, though he did not propose theistic creationism as an alternative. Hogan was skeptical of scientific consensus about climate change and ozone depletion.

Hogan believed that the Holocaust did not happen in the manner described by mainstream historians, writing that he found the work of Arthur Butz and Mark Weber to be "more scholarly, scientific, and convincing than what the history written by the victors says". In March 2010, in an essay defending Holocaust denier Ernst Zündel, Hogan stated that the mainstream history of the Holocaust includes "claims that are wildly fantastic, mutually contradictory, and defy common sense and often physical possibility".

Hogan died of heart failure at his home in Ireland on Monday, 12 July 2010, aged 69.

== Bibliography ==
=== Novels ===
- The Genesis Machine (ISBN 978-0-7434-3597-0) – April 1978.
- The Two Faces of Tomorrow (ISBN 978-1-59307-563-7) – June 1979.
- Thrice Upon a Time (ISBN 978-0-345-32386-6) – March 1980.
- Voyage from Yesteryear (ISBN 978-0-671-57798-8) – July 1982 (also (ISBN 0-345-29472-6 or ISBN 0-671-57798-0) (Paperbacks)).
- Code of the Lifemaker (ISBN 978-0-345-30925-9) – June 1983 (exploring ideas of a Clanking replicator robotic system).
- The Proteus Operation (ISBN 978-0-553-05095-0) – October 1985.
- Endgame Enigma (ISBN 978-0-671-87796-5) – August 1987.
- The Mirror Maze (ISBN 978-0-553-27762-3) – March 1989.
- The Infinity Gambit (ISBN 978-0-553-28918-3) – March 1991.
- The Multiplex Man (ISBN 978-0-553-56363-4) – December 1992.
- The Immortality Option (ISBN 978-0-345-37915-3) – February 1995 (sequel to Code of the Lifemaker).
- Realtime Interrupt (ISBN 978-0-671-57884-8) – March 1995.
- Paths To Otherwhere (ISBN 978-0-671-87710-1) – February 1996.
- Bug Park (ISBN 978-0-671-87773-6) – April 1997.
- Outward Bound (ISBN 978-0-8125-7191-2) – March 1999 (A Jupiter Novel).
- Cradle of Saturn (ISBN 978-0-671-57866-4) – June 1999.
- The Legend That Was Earth (ISBN 978-0-671-31840-6) – October 2000.
- The Anguished Dawn (ISBN 978-0-7434-9876-0) – June 2003 (sequel to "Cradle of Saturn").
- Echoes of an Alien Sky (ISBN 978-1-4165-2108-2) – February 2007.
- Moon Flower (ISBN 978-1-4165-5534-6) – April 2008.
- Migration (ISBN 978-1-4391-3352-1) – 18 May 2010.

==== Giants series ====
1. Inherit the Stars (ISBN 978-0-345-28907-0) – May 1977.
2. The Gentle Giants of Ganymede (ISBN 978-0-345-01933-2) – May 1978.
3. Giants' Star (ISBN 978-0-345-32720-8) – July 1981.
4. Entoverse (ISBN 978-0-517-09778-6) – October 1991.
5. Mission to Minerva (ISBN 978-1-4165-2090-0) – May 2005.

=== Short stories ===
- "Assassin" (May 1978, Stellar #4, recollected in Minds, Machines & Evolution).
- "Silver Shoes for a Princess" (October 1979, Destinies, October-December 1979, collected in Minds, Machines & Evolution and reworked as the first section of Star Child).
- "The Sword of Damocles" (May 1980, Stellar #5, an adapted version appears in Catastrophes, Chaos & Convolutions).
- "Neander-Tale" (December 1980, The Magazine of Fantasy & Science Fiction, collected in Minds, Machines & Evolution).
- "Till Death Us Do Part" (January 1981, Stellar #6, collected in Minds, Machines & Evolution).
- "Making Light" (August 1981, Stellar #7, collected in Minds, Machines & Evolution).
- "Identity Crisis" (August 1981, Stellar #7, collected in Rockets, Redheads & Revolution).
- "The Pacifist" (June 1988, Minds, Machines & Evolution).
- "Code of the Lifemaker: Prologue" (June 1988, Minds, Machines & Evolution (the first segment of the novel of the same name)).
- "Merry Gravmas" (June 1988, Minds, Machines & Evolution).
- "Generation Gap" (June 1988, Minds, Machines & Evolution).
- "Rules Within Rules" (June 1988, Minds, Machines & Evolution).
- "The Absolutely Foolproof Alibi" (June 1988, Minds, Machines & Evolution).
- "Down To Earth" (June 1988, Minds, Machines & Evolution).
- "Leapfrog" (August 1989, Alternate Empires, collected in Rockets, Redheads & Revolution).
- "Last Ditch" (December 1992, Analog Science Fiction and Fact, collected in Rockets, Redheads & Revolution).
- "Out of Time" (December 1993, chapbook (ISBN 978-0-553-29971-7), collected in Rockets, Redheads & Revolution).
- "Zap Thy Neighbor" (September 1995, How to Save the World, collected in Rockets, Redheads & Revolution).
- "Madam Butterfly" (July 1997, Free Space, collected in Rockets, Redheads & Revolution).
- "Silver Gods from the Sky" (June 1998, Star Child (second part)).
- "Three Domes and a Tower" (June 1998, Star Child (third part)).
- "The Stillness Among the Stars" (June 1998, Star Child (fourth part)).
- "His Own Worst Enemy" (October 2001, Martian Knightlife (a Kieran Thane story)).
- "The Kahl of Tadzhikstan" (October 2001, Martian Knightlife (a Kieran Thane story)).
- "Convolution" (October 2001, Past Imperfect, collected in Catastrophes, Chaos & Convolutions).
- "Take Two" (December 2001, Silicon Dreams, collected in Catastrophes, Chaos & Convolutions).
- "Jailhouse Rock" (June 2004, Cosmic Tales: Adventures in Sol System (a Kieran Thane story)).
- "The Colonizing of Tharle" (July 2004, Visions of Liberty).
- "The Tree of Dreams" (February 2005, Cosmic Tales II: Adventures in Far Futures, collected in Catastrophes, Chaos & Convolutions).
- "The Falcon" (June 2005, Apex Science Fiction and Horror Digest, Summer 2005, collected in Catastrophes, Chaos & Convolutions).
- "Decontamination Squad" (July 2005, Challenger #22, collected in Catastrophes, Chaos & Convolutions).
- "The Guardians" (December 2005, Catastrophes, Chaos & Convolutions).
- "Murphy's War" (August 2007, Jim Baen's Universe).
- "Escape" (February 2008, Transhuman).

=== Short story collections and fixups ===
- Minds, Machines & Evolution (ISBN 978-0-553-27288-8) – June 1988 (Bantam Spectra, republished by Baen, December 1999, short stories and essays).
- Star Child (ISBN 978-0-671-87878-8) – June 1998 (expansion of "Silver Shoes for a Princess" to a four-story cycle: "Silver Shoes for a Princess", "Silver Gods from the Sky", "Three Domes and a Tower" and "The Stillness Among the Stars")
- Rockets, Redheads & Revolution (ISBN 0-671-57807-3) – April 1999 (Baen, short stories and essays)
- Martian Knightlife (ISBN 978-0-7434-3591-8) – October 2001 (two novellas, "His Own Worst Enemy" and "The Kahl of Tadzhikstan", both featuring the Simon Templar-influenced Kieran Thane)
- Catastrophes, Chaos & Convolutions (title as published; was to be Catastrophes, Creation & Convolutions) (ISBN 978-1-4165-0921-9) – December 2005 (Baen, short stories and essays)

=== Omnibus editions ===
Compilations of novels in the "Giants series".

- The Minervan Experiment (ISBN 978-1-125-44892-2) – November 1982 (an omnibus edition of the first three books of the Giants series)
- The Giants Novels: Inherit the Stars, The Gentle Giants of Ganymede, and Giants' Star (ISBN 978-0-345-38885-8) – March 1994 (republication of The Minervan Experiment)
- The Two Moons (ISBN 978-1-4165-0936-3) - April 2006 (omnnibus of the first two Giants novels)
- The Two Worlds (ISBN 978-1-4165-3725-0) - September 2007 (omnibus of the third and fourth Giants novels)

=== Non-fiction ===
- Mind Matters – Exploring the World of Artificial Intelligence (ISBN 978-0-614-28202-3) – March 1997
- Kicking the Sacred Cow: Heresy and Impermissible Thoughts in Science (ISBN 978-1-4165-2073-3) – July 2004
