= Powershift (book) =

Book by Alvin Toffler

Powershift: Knowledge, Wealth, and Violence at the Edge of the 21st Century
- Author: Alvin Toffler
- Language: English
- Subjects: Futurology, power politics
- Publisher: Bantam Books
- Publication date: 1990
- Publication place: United States
- Media type: Print (Hardcover)
- Pages: 585
- ISBN: 0-553-05776-6
- Preceded by: The Third Wave

Powershift: Knowledge, Wealth and Violence at the Edge of the 21st Century is the third book in a trilogy written by the futurist Alvin Toffler, following Future Shock (1970) and The Third Wave (1980). The hardcover first edition was published October 1, 1990.

== The Trinity of Power ==
The combination of knowledge, wealth and force is described by Toffler as providing individuals or other entities power. Knowledge is the most powerful form of power, considering we are now living in a Knowledge-based civilization. Wealth is another form of power, and is flexible in nature, since it can be used as punishment (like a stick) or reward (as a carrot). Finally force, in lay terms violence, is noted as another element of power. It isn't as flexible as the other elements of power, since you can't exactly "take back" shooting someone or punching them in the face. However, the psychological capability that you have force available, like a cowboy or police man with a gun in his holster is often all it takes to ensure compliance.

== Transformation of Elements of Power ==
Toffler emphasizes that any of the elements of power can be transformed from one to another such that the individual has the Trinity no matter where they started from. For example, force, like a gun/knife (or silent threat of a gun/knife) can be used to obtain Knowledge (information) or Wealth (money). Wealth can be used to obtain Force, like hiring a hit man or buying poison. Wealth can be used to obtain knowledge, like bribing or buying a book. But ultimately, knowledge is emphasized as the most effective (efficient) way to start off. Through knowledge, like the knowledge in this article or other sources on the internet, methods can be found to obtain Force (ex. connections to the "under world") and Wealth (ex. stock tips). A Wealth of Knowledge is now available on the internet and at the disposal of the user through the finger tips. In particular, information related to cybernetics, the modern word for things like casting voodoo spells is freely found on YouTube and other sources. Cybernetics also relates to other fields like numerology and symbology which are powerful tools for obtaining Force and Wealth. Considering Toffler refers to our civilization and economy based upon symbology, or a "symbolic economy", then this is indeed powerful for any individual.

== The Power of Knowledge ==
Toffler emphasizes that of the trinity of power, the use of wealth and force is available to the elite, however, knowledge is something available to even the non-elite. What's interesting about Knowledge is that it can be generated infinitely as we all try to reach an understanding of "The Truth" if there is one. In Toffler's words, "Knowledge is the most democratic source of Power".
