= The Legend That Was Earth =

2000 novel by James P. Hogan

- First edition
- Author: James P. Hogan
- Cover artist: Dru Blair
- Language: English
- Publisher: Baen Publishing Enterprises
- Publication date: 2000

The Legend That Was Earth is a novel by science fiction author James P. Hogan; it was published in 2000 by Baen Publishing Enterprises. It includes several themes common to science fiction, such as dystopias, alien encounters, and the distinctions of personhood. It has been called a "political fantasy."

== Plot ==
At the onset of the story, aliens called Hyadeans have established contact and friendly business relations with Earth. They think Earth is fascinating because it so different from their own bleak, austere culture. Though they are highly interested in studying the planet and its cultures, Hyadeans are far more technologically advanced and have a more accurate knowledge of science. Many humans accept this alien presence, but there are many who do not trust the Hyadeans and believe they are plotting to take control of Earth. One group that espouses this belief is CounterAction, which the American government lists as a terrorist organization. When a flyer (advanced aircraft) carrying both Hyadean visitors and Terran politicians is shot down, CounterAction is blamed and the Internal Security Service (ISS) is intent on shutting down their organization by any methods necessary.

The action follows savvy Roland Cade who gives up his comfortable life when he is pulled into CounterAction. Because he was formerly married to Marie Cade, a political activist who plays a strong role in CounterAction, the ISS uses him to trace her. His mistress Julia is secretly an ISS agent, and convinces him to use his contacts with CounterAction to take in her friend, a supposed political dissident. He takes the friend to Chattanooga, where he unexpectedly runs into Marie. Julia's friend turns out to be an ISS plant and he is forced to flee with Marie; the government believes he is a part of CounterAction because of his wife’s association with the group. They both use their connections to get aid in dodging the government, and these connections form an unlikely bond. CounterAction has been strongly anti-Hyadean, but they find allies in Cade’s Hyadean friend Vrel and some of his comrades.

For much of the story, the action switches between Cade’s group of friends’ attempt to escape capture and the actions of the ISS as more information is revealed. While Cade and his friends learn that states and regions of the country are seceding, the Hyadean officials take over the increasingly impotent government and use military force to subdue resistance. However, a pro-Terran alien interviews Cade and Marie and films footage of Hyadean and government cruelty. This interview gets broadcast to both Earth and the aliens’ planet Chryse. As a result, many Hyadeans pledge their support and Terrans are given courage to fight for their freedom. The struggle stops being an Earth vs. alien skirmish, and becomes a fight for the rights of both Terran and Hyadean.

While Cade, Marie, and their posse travel from country to country to gain new allies and to find shelter, the Hyadean military steps ups its campaign and CounterAction comes under more attacks. They are attacked everywhere they flee, and their Hyadean allies suffer a massive defeat when a Hyadean mission is bombed. Finally, it appears the organization is done for entirely when a formation of giant airships appears. The ships are believed to be both Hyadean and capable of mass destruction. However, the ships belong to a friendly third party of a different alien civilization, the Querl; these aliens have come to help Terrans. CounterAction gets the news that the Hyadean government has just crumpled from popular indigenous support for Earth, and the war is over. New governments form and a stronger, benevolent union between Earth and Chryse begins.

== Major characters ==
- Roland Cade, a popular, influential, wealthy man who lives in Newport, California. He is known as a "Fixer", or a go-between for people. Though he is not interested in politics at the start of the book, he is thrown into the world of intrigue after his ex-wife Marie's political organization called CounterAction is accused of shooting down a Hyadean aircraft. His mistress Julia tricks him into getting touch with CounterAction in order to track down Marie. Because Cade helps Marie escape from her pursuers, the government considers him a terrorist as well. As he is forced to stick with CounterAction for survival, he learns that the government is really a puppet to Hyadean rulers, who want to colonize Earth. The desperate nature of his situation also makes him realize the relative shallowness of his former life, and he becomes a deeper, charismatic leader. He also realizes he is still in love with Marie after she is temporarily presumed to be dead in a helicopter crash. After the war is over, he and Marie become celebrities due to their war heroics and set off on a diplomatic trip to Chryse.
- Marie Cade, Roland’s ex-wife, and an avid political activist and belongs to the group CounterAction. Her political obsession was a factor that led to their divorce, but Cade comes to respect it and even starts to embrace some of those qualities himself. Even though the two are divorced, Marie has never stopped loving Cade.
- Vrel, a Hyadean and one of Cade’s friends from the beginning of the book. He is an economist and political commentator working on Earth. During his stay, he has developed more 'human' feelings. For instance, he is in a relationship with a Terran, something very avant-garde in both cultures. He also becomes altruistic; this is seen in the way he helps Cade. After Cade has been labeled a terrorist, Vrel uses his political influence to smuggle Cade and Marie out of the country. He then accompanies them on their mission to stop the Hyadean government from taking over Earth.
- Brezc Hudro, a Hyadean military officer who has switched loyalties from Chryse to Earth after observing the brutality the Hyadean military is forcing Terran soldiers to inflict on their own people. He knows the Hyadean military's goal is to use the Terran troops to clear the land of people so Hyadean businessmen can use it. Hudro states that he wants to save lives instead of destroying them. He and his girlfriend Yassem have also recently adopted Terran religious beliefs.

== Reviews ==
The reviews have been mixed. The Historical Dictionary of Science Fiction reviewed the book simply as just a "political fantasy." Don D'Ammassa, in his Encyclopedia of Science Fiction, called it "less than impressive" and "frequently lethargic," but the alien/human relationships "overcome the ponderous plot."
