= Future Shock =

1970 book by Alvin Toffler

- Author: Alvin Toffler
- Language: English
- Subject: Social Sciences
- Publisher: Random House
- Publication date: 1970
- Publication place: United States
- Media type: Print (hardback & paperback)
- ISBN: 0-394-42586-3 (original hardcover)
- Followed by: The Third Wave

Future Shock is a 1970 book by American futurist Alvin Toffler, written together with his wife Adelaide Elizabeth “Heidi” Farrell Toffler, in which the authors define the term "future shock" as a certain psychological state of individuals and entire societies, and a personal perception of "too much change in too short a period of time". The book, which became an international bestseller, has been widely translated.

The book grew out of the article "The Future as a Way of Life" in Horizon magazine, Summer 1965 issue.

== Major themes ==
=== Future shock ===
Alvin Toffler argued that society is undergoing an enormous structural change, a revolution from an industrial society to a "super-industrial society". This change, he states, overwhelms people. He argues that the accelerated rate of technological and social change leaves people disconnected and suffering from "shattering stress and disorientation"—future shocked. Toffler stated that the majority of social problems are symptoms of future shock. In his discussion of the components of such shock, he popularized the term "information overload."

This analysis of the phenomenon of information overload is continued in later publications, especially The Third Wave and Powershift.

In the introduction to an essay titled "Future Shock" in his book, Conscientious Objections, Neil Postman wrote:

Sometime about the middle of 1963, my colleague Charles Weingartner and I delivered in tandem an address to the National Council of Teachers of English. In that address we used the phrase "future shock" as a way of describing the social paralysis induced by rapid technological change. To my knowledge, Weingartner and I were the first people ever to use it in a public forum. Of course, neither Weingartner nor I had the brains to write a book called Future Shock, and all due credit goes to Alvin Toffler for having recognized a good phrase when one came along. (p. 162)

=== Development of society and production ===
Toffler distinguished three stages in the development of society and production: agrarian, industrial, and post-industrial.

Each of these waves develops its own "super-ideology” to explain reality. This ideology affects all the spheres that make up a civilization phase: technology, social patterns, information patterns, and power patterns.

The first stage began in the period of the Neolithic Era with the advent of agriculture, thereby passing from barbarity to civilization. A large number of people acted as prosumers (eating their grown food, hunting animals, building their own houses, making clothes,....). People traded by exchanging their own goods for commodities of others. The second stage began in England with the Industrial Revolution with the invention of the machine tool and the steam engine. People worked in factories to make money they could spend on goods they needed (it means they produced for exchange, not for use). Countries also created new social systems. The third stage began in the second half of the 20th century in the West when people invented automatic production, robotics, and the computer. The services sector attained great value.

Toffler proposed one criterion for distinguishing between industrial society and post-industrial society: the share of the population occupied in agriculture versus the share of city labor occupied in the services sector. In a post-industrial society, the share of the people occupied in agriculture does not exceed 15%, and the share of city laborers occupied in the services sector exceeds 50%. Thus, the share of the people occupied with brainwork greatly exceeds the share of the people occupied with physical work in post-industrial society.

The third wave led to the Information Era (now). Homes are the dominant institutions. Most people carry produce and consume in their homes or electronic cottages, as they produce more of their own products and services markets become less important for them. People consider each other to be equally free as vendors of prosumer-generated commodities.

=== Features of post-industrial society ===
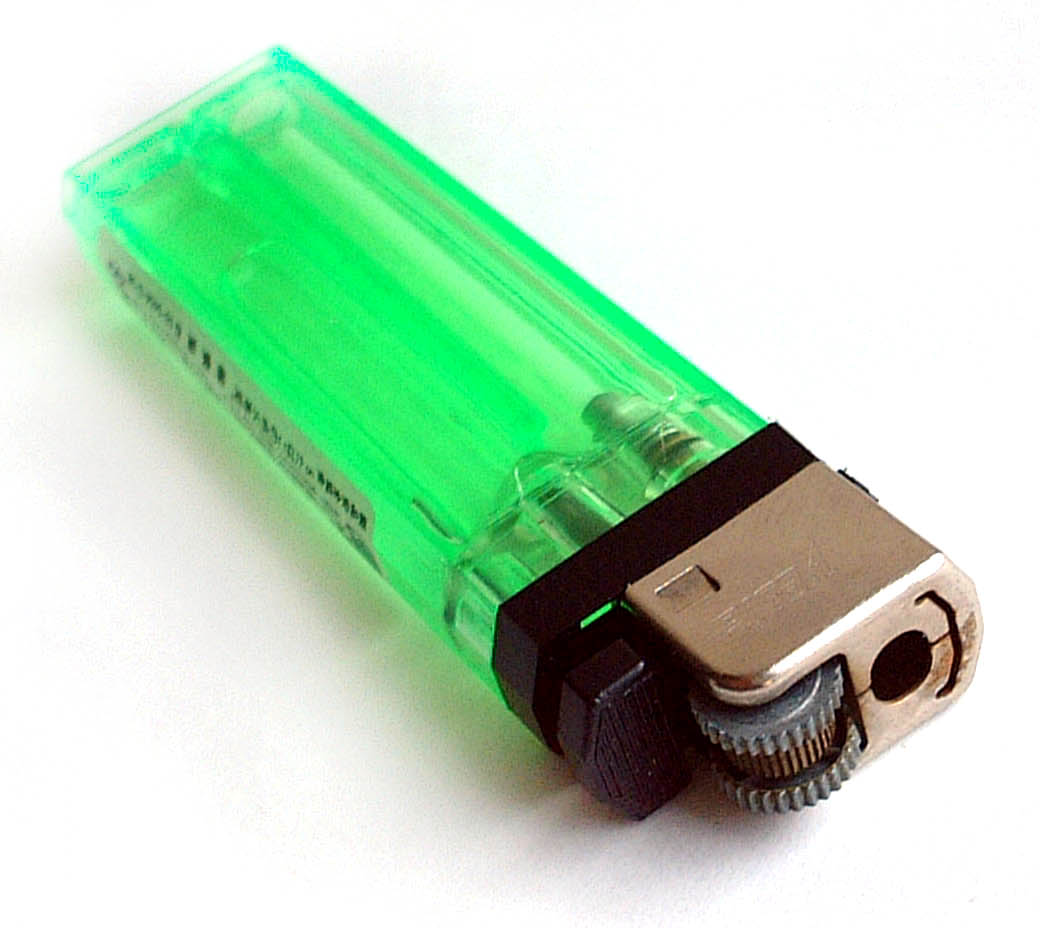
A generic, disposable lighter

- Many goods have become disposable as the cost of manual repair or cleaning has become greater than the cost of making new goods due to mass production. Examples of disposable goods include ballpoint pens, lighters, plastic bottles, and paper towels.
- The overall production of goods and services doubles every 50 years in developed countries. Society experiences an increasing number of changes with increasing rapidity, while people are losing the familiarity that old institutions (religion, family, national identity, profession) once provided.
- "Brain drain," or Human capital flight, is both an indicator of the changes in society and also one of their causes.
- The design of goods becomes outdated quickly. (And so, for example, a second generation of computers appears before the end of the expected period of usability of the first generation.)
- It is possible to rent almost everything (from a ladder to a wedding dress), thus eliminating the need for ownership.
- Whole branches of industry die off and new branches of industry arise. This affects unskilled workers who are compelled to change their residence to find new jobs. The constant change in the market also poses a problem for advertisers who must deal with moving targets.
- People of post-industrial society change their profession and their workplace often. People have to change professions because professions quickly become outdated. People of post-industrial society thus have many careers in a lifetime. The knowledge of an engineer becomes outdated in ten years. People look more and more for temporary jobs.
- To follow transient jobs, people have become nomads. For example, immigrants from Algeria, Turkey, and other countries go to Europe to find work. Transient people are forced to change residence, phone number, school, friends, car license, and contact with family often. As a result, relationships tend to be superficial with a large number of people, instead of being intimate or close relationships that are more stable. Evidence for this is tourist travel and holiday romances.
- The driver's license, received at age 16, has become the teenager's admission to the world of adults because it symbolizes the ability to move independently.
- Death of Permanence. The post-industrial society will be marked by a transient culture where everything ranging from goods to human relationships will be temporary.

== Significance and reception ==
The book sold over 6 million copies within five years and has been widely translated (it had translations into twenty foreign languages as of 2003). It has been described as "an international bestseller within weeks of publication".

A documentary film based on the book was released in 1972 with Orson Welles as the on-screen narrator.

Wang Huning, a distinguished member of the CCP Politburo Standing Committee mentioned the book in his 1991 travelogue America Against America.

== See also ==
- Accelerating change – Increase in the rate of technological change through history
- Adhocracy – Organization type characterized by minimal structure
- Culture shock – Experience of a person moving to a different cultural environment
- Population decline
- Electric Dreams (BBC TV series) – BBC television documentary series
- Paradigm shift – Fundamental change in ideas and practices within a scientific discipline
- Post-industrial society – Service and knowledge-based society
- Social alienation – Disconnection in social relationships
- Technological singularity – Hypothetical event
