= Clement Bezold =

American political scientist and author

Clement Bezold is a political scientist, author, futurist and a founder of the Institute for Alternative Futures (IAF) as well as its for-profit subsidiary Alternative Futures Associates.

Bezold received a Ph.D. in political science from the University of Florida.

In 1977, Bezold established the Institute for Alternative Futures in Alexandria, Virginia. Its goal was to encourage "Anticipatory Democracy". In 1982, Bezold started Alternative Futures Associates as a consulting firm on corporate strategic planning.

Bezold has written or edited books related to the future, particularly on the future of health care. He serves as the Consulting Editor for the Journal of Futures Studies and sits on the editorial advisory boards of the journals Foresight: The International Journal of Applied Forecasting, Technology Forecasting and Social Change and World Future Review.

== Books, Reports & Selected Articles ==
- Anticipatory Democracy: People in Politics of the Future (1978)
- The Future of Work and Health (1985)
