= Alvin Toffler =

American writer, futurist and businessman (1928–2016)

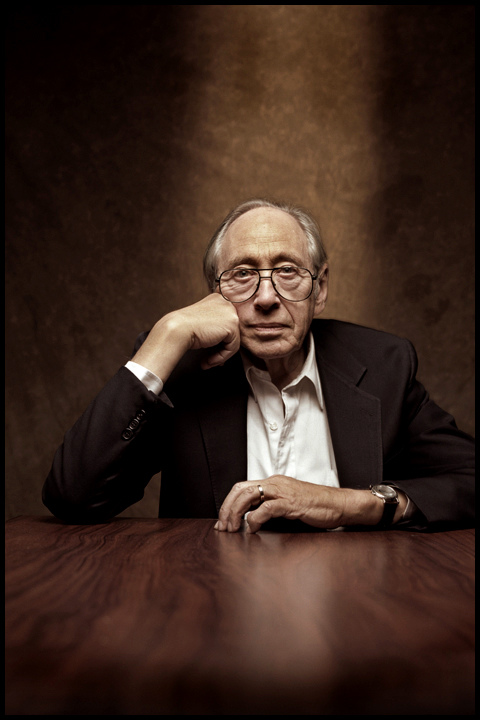
- Toffler in 2006
- Born: Alvin Eugene Toffler; October 4, 1928; New York City, U.S.
- Died: June 27, 2016 (aged 87); Los Angeles, California, U.S.
- Resting place: Pierce Brothers Westwood Village Memorial Park and Mortuary, Westwood, Los Angeles
- Education: New York University (BA)
- Occupations: Futurist; author; journalist; educator
- Spouse: Heidi Farrell (m. 1950)
- Children: 1
- Writing career
- Notable works: Future Shock; The Third Wave; Powershift
- Notable awards: McKinsey Foundation Book Award; Ordre des Arts et des Lettres

Alvin Eugene Toffler (October 4, 1928 – June 27, 2016) was an American writer, futurist, and businessman known for his works discussing modern technologies, including the digital revolution and the communication revolution, with emphasis on their effects on cultures worldwide. He is regarded as one of the world's outstanding futurists.

Toffler was an associate editor of Fortune magazine. In his early works he focused on technology and its impact, which he termed "information overload". In 1970, his first major book about the future, Future Shock, became a worldwide best-seller and has sold over 6 million copies.

He and his wife Heidi Toffler (1929–2019), who collaborated with him for most of his writings, moved on to examining the reaction to changes in society with another best-selling book, The Third Wave, in 1980. In it, he foresaw such technological advances as cloning, personal computers, the Internet, cable television and mobile communication. His later focus, via their other best-seller, Powershift, (1990), was on the increasing power of 21st-century military hardware and the proliferation of new technologies.

He founded Toffler Associates, a management consulting company, and was a visiting scholar at the Russell Sage Foundation, visiting professor at Cornell University, faculty member of the New School for Social Research, a White House correspondent, and a business consultant. Toffler's ideas and writings were a significant influence on the thinking of business and government leaders worldwide, including China's Zhao Ziyang, and AOL founder Steve Case.

== Early life ==
Alvin Toffler was born on October 4, 1928, in New York City, and raised in Brooklyn. He was the son of Rose (Albaum) and Sam Toffler, a furrier, both Polish Jews who had migrated to America. He had one younger sister. He was inspired to become a writer at the age of 7 by his aunt and uncle, who lived with the Tofflers. "They were Depression-era literary intellectuals," Toffler said, "and they always talked about exciting ideas."

Toffler graduated from New York University in 1950 as an English major, though by his own account he was more focused on political activism than grades. He met his future wife, Adelaide Elizabeth Farrell (nicknamed "Heidi"), when she was starting a graduate course in linguistics. Being radical students, they decided against further graduate work and moved to Cleveland, Ohio, where they married on April 29, 1950.

== Career ==
Seeking experiences to write about, Alvin and Heidi Toffler spent the next five years as blue collar workers on assembly lines while studying industrial mass production in their daily work. He compared his own desire for experience to other writers, such as Jack London, who in his quest for subjects to write about sailed the seas, and John Steinbeck, who went to pick grapes with migrant workers. In their first factory jobs, Heidi became a union shop steward in the aluminum foundry where she worked. Alvin became a millwright and welder. In the evenings Alvin would write poetry and fiction, but discovered he was proficient at neither.

His hands-on practical labor experience helped Alvin Toffler land a position at a union-backed newspaper, a transfer to its Washington bureau in 1957, then three years as a White House correspondent, covering Congress and the White House for a Pennsylvania daily newspaper.

They returned to New York City in 1959 when Fortune magazine invited Alvin to become its labor columnist, later having him write about business and management. After leaving Fortune magazine in 1962, Toffler began a freelance career, writing long form articles for scholarly journals and magazines. His 1964 Playboy interviews with Russian novelist Vladimir Nabokov and Ayn Rand were considered among the magazine's best. His interview with Rand was the first time the magazine had given such a platform to a female intellectual, which as one commentator said, "the real bird of paradise Toffler captured for Playboy in 1964 was Ayn Rand."

Toffler was hired by IBM to conduct research and write a paper on the social and organizational impact of computers, leading to his contact with the earliest computer "gurus" and artificial intelligence researchers and proponents. Xerox invited him to write about its research laboratory and AT&T consulted him for strategic advice. This AT&T work led to a study of telecommunications, which advised the company's top management to break up the company more than a decade before the government forced AT&T to break up.

In the mid-1960s, the Tofflers began five years of research on what would become Future Shock, published in 1970. It has sold over 6 million copies worldwide, according to the New York Times, or over 15 million copies according to the Tofflers' Web site. Toffler coined the term "future shock" to refer to what happens to a society when change happens too fast, which results in social confusion and normal decision-making processes breaking down. The book has never been out of print and has been translated into dozens of languages.

He continued the theme in The Third Wave in 1980. While he describes the first and second waves as the agricultural and industrial revolutions, the "third wave," a phrase he coined, represents the current information, computer-based revolution. He forecast the spread of the Internet and email, interactive media, cable television, cloning, and other digital advancements. He claimed that one of the side effects of the digital age has been "information overload". Yet another term he coined is "prosumer", which describes a person who is simultaneously a producer and consumer.

In 1990, he wrote Powershift, also with the help of his wife, Heidi.

In 1996, with American business consultant Tom Johnson, they co-founded Toffler Associates, an advisory firm designed to implement many of the ideas the Tofflers had written on. The firm worked with businesses, NGOs, and governments in the United States, South Korea, Mexico, Brazil, Singapore, Australia, and other countries. During this period in his career, Toffler lectured worldwide, taught at several schools and met world leaders, such as Mikhail Gorbachev, along with key executives and military officials.

=== Ideas and opinions ===
"A new civilization is emerging in our lives, and blind men everywhere are trying to suppress it. This new civilization brings with it new family styles; changed ways of working, loving, and living; a new economy; new political conflicts; and beyond all this an altered consciousness as well...The dawn of this new civilization is the single most explosive fact of our lifetimes."

— Alvin Toffler, from The Third Wave (1980)

Toffler stated many of his ideas during an interview with the Australian Broadcasting Corporation in 1998. "Society needs people who take care of the elderly and who know how to be compassionate and honest," he said. "Society needs people who work in hospitals. Society needs all kinds of skills that are not just cognitive; they're emotional, they're affectional. You can't run the society on data and computers alone."

His opinions about the future of education, many of which were in Future Shock, have often been quoted. An often misattributed quote, however, is that of psychologist Herbert Gerjuoy: "Tomorrow's illiterate will not be the man who can't read; he will be the man who has not learned how to learn."

Early in his career, after traveling to other countries, he became aware of the new and myriad inputs that visitors received from these other cultures. He explained during an interview that some visitors would become "truly disoriented and upset" by the strange environment, which he described as a reaction to culture shock. From that issue, he foresaw another problem for the future, when a culturally "new environment comes to you ... and comes to you rapidly." That kind of sudden cultural change within one's own country, which he felt many would not understand, would lead to a similar reaction, one of "future shock", which he wrote about in his book by that title. Toffler writes:

We must search out totally new ways to anchor ourselves, for all the old roots—religion, nation, community, family, or profession—are now shaking under the hurricane impact of the accelerative thrust.

In The Third Wave, Toffler describes three types of societies, based on the concept of "waves"—each wave pushes the older societies and cultures aside. He describes the "First Wave" as the society after agrarian revolution and replaced the first hunter-gatherer cultures. The "Second Wave," he labels society during the Industrial Revolution (ca. late 17th century through the mid-20th century). That period saw the increase of urban industrial populations which had undermined the traditional nuclear family, and initiated a factory-like education system, and the growth of the corporation. Toffler said:

The Second Wave Society is industrial and based on mass production, mass distribution, mass consumption, mass education, mass media, mass recreation, mass entertainment, and weapons of mass destruction. You combine those things with standardization, centralization, concentration, and synchronization, and you wind up with a style of organization we call bureaucracy.

The "Third Wave" was a term he coined to describe the post-industrial society, which began in the late 1950s. His description of this period dovetails with other futurist writers, who also wrote about the Information Age, Space Age, Electronic Era, Global Village, terms which highlighted a scientific-technological revolution. The Tofflers claimed to have predicted a number of geopolitical events, such as the collapse of the Soviet Union, the fall of the Berlin Wall and the future economic growth in the Asia-Pacific region.

== Influences and popular culture ==
Toffler often visited with dignitaries in Asia, including China's Zhao Ziyang, Singapore's Lee Kuan Yew and South Korea's Kim Dae Jung, all of whom were influenced by his views as Asia's emerging markets increased in global significance during the 1980s and 1990s. Although they had originally censored some of his books and ideas, China's government cited him along with Franklin D. Roosevelt and Bill Gates as being among the Westerners who had most influenced their country. The Third Wave along with a video documentary based on it became best-sellers in China and were widely distributed to schools. The video's success inspired the marketing of videos on related themes in the late 1990s by Infowars, whose name is derived from the term coined by Toffler in the book. Toffler's influence on Asian thinkers was summed up in an article in Daedalus, published by the American Academy of Arts & Sciences:

Where an earlier generation of Chinese, Korean, and Vietnamese revolutionaries wanted to re-enact the Paris Commune as imagined by Karl Marx, their post-revolutionary successors now want to re-enact Silicon Valley as imagined by Alvin Toffler.

U.S. House Speaker Newt Gingrich publicly lauded his ideas about the future, and urged members of Congress to read Toffler's book, Creating a New Civilization (1995). Others, such as AOL founder Steve Case, cited Toffler's The Third Wave as a formative influence on his thinking, which inspired him to write The Third Wave: An Entrepreneur's Vision of the Future in 2016. Case said that Toffler was a "real pioneer in helping people, companies and even countries lean into the future."

In 1980, Ted Turner founded CNN, which he said was inspired by Toffler's forecasting the end of the dominance of the three main television networks. Turner's company, Turner Broadcasting, published Toffler's Creating a New Civilization in 1995. Shortly after the book was released, the former Soviet president Mikhail Gorbachev hosted the Global Governance Conference in San Francisco with the theme, Toward a New Civilization, which was attended by dozens of world figures, including the Tofflers, George H. W. Bush, Margaret Thatcher, Carl Sagan, Abba Eban and Turner with his then-wife, actress Jane Fonda.

Mexican billionaire Carlos Slim was influenced by his works, and became a friend of the writer. Global marketer J.D. Power also said he was inspired by Toffler's works.

Since the 1960s, people had tried to make sense out of the effect of new technologies and social change, a problem which made Toffler's writings widely influential beyond the confines of scientific, economic, and public policy. His works and ideas have been subject to various criticisms, usually with the same argumentation used against futurology: that foreseeing the future is nigh impossible.

Techno music pioneer Juan Atkins cites Toffler's phrase "techno rebels" in The Third Wave as inspiring him to use the word "techno" to describe the musical style he helped to create

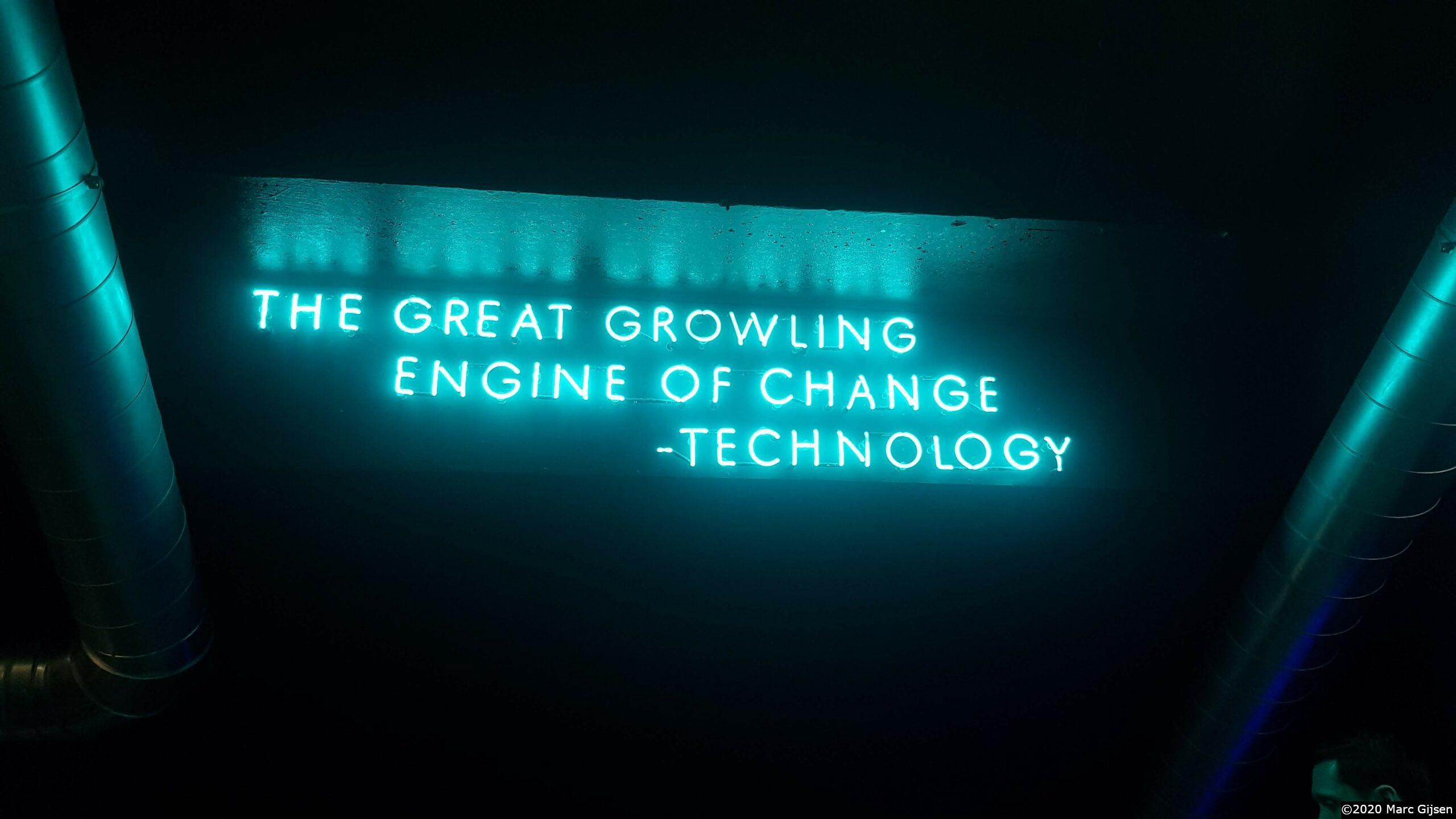
A quote of Alvin Toffler at the entrance of the club named after him in Rotterdam, the Netherlands

Musician Curtis Mayfield released a disco song called "Future Shock," later covered in an electro version by Herbie Hancock. Science fiction author John Brunner wrote "The Shockwave Rider," from the concept of "future shock."

The nightclub Toffler, in Rotterdam, is named after him.

In the song "Victoria" by The Exponents, the protagonist's daily routine and cultural interests are described: "She's up in time to watch the soap operas, reads Cosmopolitan and Alvin Toffler".

== Critical assessment ==
Accenture, the management consultancy firm, identified Toffler in 2002 as being among the most influential voices in business leaders, along with Bill Gates and Peter Drucker. Toffler has also been described in a Financial Times interview as the "world's most famous futurologist". In 2006, the People's Daily classed him among the 50 foreigners who shaped modern China, which one U.S. newspaper notes made him a "guru of sorts to world statesmen." Chinese Premier and General Secretary Zhao Ziyang was greatly influenced by Toffler. He convened conferences to discuss The Third Wave in the early 1980s, and in 1985 the book was the No. 2 best seller in China.

Author Mark Satin characterizes Toffler as an important early influence on radical centrist political thought.

Newt Gingrich became close to the Tofflers in the 1970s and said The Third Wave had immensely influenced his own thinking and was "one of the great seminal works of our time."

== Selected awards ==
Toffler has received several prestigious prizes and awards, including the McKinsey Foundation Book Award for Contributions to Management Literature, Officier de L'Ordre des Arts et Lettres, and appointments, including Fellow of the American Association for the Advancement of Science and the International Institute for Strategic Studies.

In 2006, Alvin and Heidi Toffler were recipients of Brown University's Independent Award.

== Personal life ==
Toffler was married to Heidi Toffler (born Adelaide Elizabeth Farrell), also a writer and futurist. They lived in the Bel Air section of Los Angeles, California, and previously lived in Redding, Connecticut.

The couple's only child, Karen Toffler (1954–2000), died at age 46 after more than a decade suffering from Guillain–Barré syndrome.

== Death ==
Alvin Toffler died in his sleep on June 27, 2016, at his home in Los Angeles. While no cause of death was available, it has been reported that he was ill before he died. He was buried at Westwood Memorial Park.

== Bibliography ==
Alvin Toffler co-wrote his books with his wife Heidi.

- The Culture Consumers (1964) St. Martin's Press, ISBN 1-199-15481-4
- The Schoolhouse in the City (1968) Praeger (editors), ISBN 0-275-67145-3
- Future Shock (1970) Bantam Books, ISBN 0-553-27737-5
- The Futurists (1972) Random House (editors), ISBN 0-394-31713-0
- Learning for Tomorrow (1974) Random House (editors), ISBN 0-394-71980-8
- The Eco-Spasm Report (1975) Bantam Books, ISBN 0-553-14474-X
- The Third Wave (1980) Bantam Books, ISBN 0-553-24698-4
- Previews & Premises (1983) William Morrow & Co, ISBN 0-688-01910-2
- The Adaptive Corporation (1985) McGraw-Hill, ISBN 0-553-25383-2
- Powershift: Knowledge, Wealth and Violence at the Edge of the 21st Century (1990) Bantam Books, ISBN 0-553-29215-3
- War and Anti-War (1993) Warner Books, ISBN 0-446-60259-0
- Creating a New Civilization (1995) Turner Pub, ISBN 1-57036-224-6
- Revolutionary Wealth (2006) Knopf, ISBN 0-375-40174-1

== See also ==
- Daniel Bell
- Norman Swan
- Human nature
- John Naisbitt
