= Giants (series) =

Group of five science fiction novels by James P. Hogan

Giants series
- Cover of Inherit The Stars, the first book in the series
- Author: James P. Hogan
- Cover artist: Darrell K. Sweet
- Genre: Science fiction
- Publisher: Del Rey Books, Baen Books
- Published: 1977–2005
- Media type: Print
- No. of books: 5 (List of books)

The Giants series (also known as the Minerva series) is a quintet of science fiction novels by James P. Hogan, published between 1977 and 2005. The series began with Inherit the Stars, published by Del Rey Books in May 1977.

== Overview ==
In the introduction to the omnibus The Two Moons, Hogan revealed that Inherit the Stars, his first novel, was inspired by the 1968 film 2001: A Space Odyssey, which he had enjoyed until the ending. After Hogan complained to his work colleagues about the confusing and effects-heavy nature of the conclusion, they bet him five pounds that he could not write and publish a science-fiction novel. Hogan later met Arthur C. Clarke and took the opportunity to chide him about the ending of 2001, to which Clarke replied that while the ending of Hogan's Inherit the Stars made more sense, the ending of 2001 had made more money.

Inherit the Stars is a scientific mystery with no antagonist or conflict as such. Instead, it followed a group of researchers who found themselves faced with a seemingly insuperable paradox: the discovery that an advanced human civilization had flourished in the Solar System fifty thousand years ago, despite having left no traces on Earth. Hogan's plots made heavy use of Velikovskian catastrophism and Dänikean ancient-astronaut theory, but attempted to base them on a rigorous natural-sciences foundation.

== Series ==
Hogan originally intended to write a closely-linked trilogy. He returned to the setting with two additional follow-ons.

1. Inherit the Stars, May 1977, ISBN 0-345-30107-2
2. The Gentle Giants of Ganymede, May 1978, ISBN 0-345-29048-8
3. Giants' Star, July 1981, ISBN 0-345-28771-1
4. Entoverse, October 1991, ISBN 1-85723-002-7
5. Mission to Minerva, January 2005, ISBN 0-7434-9902-6

These were assembled in several omnibus editions and collections:

- The Minervan Experiment (ISBN 978-1-125-44892-2)—November 1982 (omnibus edition of the first three books)
- The Giants Novels: Inherit the Stars, The Gentle Giants of Ganymede, and Giants' Star (ISBN 978-0-345-38885-8)—March 1994 (republication of The Minervan Experiment)
- The Two Moons (ISBN 978-1-4165-0936-3)—April 2006 (omnibus of the first two books)
- The Two Worlds (ISBN 978-1-4165-3725-0)—September 2007 (omnibus of the third and fourth books)

In his introduction to The Two Worlds, Hogan mentioned the possibility of a sixth book, but added that there was "nothing definite in the works"; there were no further additions to the series before his passing in 2010.

== Story ==
=== Inherit the Stars ===
In 2027, humanity is experiencing a minor golden age. The world is at peace, and the Cold War has wound down amid a trend of détente and general disarmament. A lunar survey crew stumbles upon a space-suited body in a small cavern on the moon, a minor mystery which becomes a major one when testing reveals that the corpse (nicknamed "Charlie") is 50,000 years old. The technology level of the spacesuit is broadly similar to that of Earth in the late 2020s, but it is clearly the product of a completely different technological base. For convenience, scientists label "Charlie's" hypothetical people "Lunarians" (though they do not believe they originated on the Moon).

The UN Space Arm discovers additional evidence of Lunarian occupancy on the Moon 50,000 years ago, including ruined bases, more human remains, and enough examples of Lunarian writing; the latter is used to decipher their language. The translated materials demonstrate that the Lunarians were—despite being genetically indistinguishable from humans—not native to Earth; records of their homeworld depict a much colder world, with a year lasting 1,700 days, enormous ice caps, and completely unfamiliar continental outlines. Additionally, it is discovered that the Lunarian bases on the moon were all simultaneously destroyed 50,000 years ago in an enormous paroxysm of violence, which included the widespread use of nuclear weapons.

Meanwhile, a Space Arm expedition to the asteroid belt establishes that it comprises the remnants of an Earth-sized planet, which is given the name "Minerva," and seems to match surviving records of the Lunarians' homeworld. 50,000 years ago, Minerva was being slowly strangled by an ice age; its people formed two totalitarian regimes, which engaged in constant warfare while attempting to evacuate their elites to the much more habitable Pleistocene Earth. Charlie's diary includes a description of the last of these wars, which was sufficiently cataclysmic in nature to have destroyed not only Lunarian civilization, but (via widespread use of antimatter-based energy weapons) destabilized the inner structure of Minerva so badly that the planet disintegrated.

These data points serve as the foundation for the central mysteries of the novel: how could identically human beings evolve independently on both Earth and Minerva? Secondarily, as the Lunarians had transported an enormous amount of military material to Earth's moon, why had they failed to take the trivial step of landing on Earth itself?

An enormous spaceship is found buried beneath the ice of Ganymede. Far more advanced than Lunarian technology, the ship proves to be twenty-five million years old and to have been crewed by three-meter-tall beings who are clearly completely unrelated to terrestrial life. However, these so-called "Ganymeans" can be evolutionarily related to samples of canned fish found in ruined Lunarian lunar bases, suggesting they were both part of the same line of descent; meaning that the Ganymeans must have been the true natives of Minerva. Biological samples found in the ship additionally demonstrate that the Ganymeans had introduced terrestrial plant and animal life to Minerva, which they hypothesize was part of an unsuccessful geoengineering project, and that the Lunarians must have evolved on Minerva from higher primates transplanted there by the Ganymeans.

The two foremost scientists of the investigation team are physicist Victor Hunt and biologist Christian Danchekker. Each develops a competing theory to explain the paradox, and they therefore find themselves initially at odds; however, they are also both deeply committed to the scientific method and the pursuit of truth, and eventually develop a rapport and a deep mutual respect for one another. They each wind up solving one half of the mystery: Hunt realizes that the Lunarians did not have reliable interplanetary capabilities at the time of their destruction, and had only made it as far as Minerva's moon, which they had fortified heavily due to their interminable wars. During their final conflict, Minerva was destroyed, and its now gravitationally unbound moon spiraled towards the inner system, where it was—by a freakish coincidence—gravitationally captured by the Earth, entering into a stable orbit (meaning that Earth's present moon is actually the former moon of Minerva.) A very small number of Lunarian survivors of both the final war and the meteoric bombardment of the Moon by the debris of Minerva managed to descend to the Earth, in as few as one remaining spaceship.

Danchekker solves the other half of the mystery: the uncanny genetic similarity between Lunarians and humans is accounted for by the fact that all modern humans are descended entirely from these Lunarian survivors. Endowed with a vicious survival instinct by the unforgiving environment of Minerva and further whetted by their history of warfare, the Lunarians had, after landing on Earth, descended into barbarism and exterminated their less advanced and aggressive cousins, the Neanderthals.

=== The Gentle Giants of Ganymede ===
The sequel concerns the return to the Solar System of an ancient Ganymean spaceship, which had been trapped in a bubble of time dilation by a malfunction in its Alcubierre drive. The novel shares the first volume's scientific-mystery structure, but this time the theme is predominantly biological, as Hunt, Danchekker, and other humans join the Ganymean survivors in untangling the confusing evolutionary history of Minerva between its abandonment by the Ganymeans and the emergence of the Lunarians.

=== Giants' Star ===
The story begins months after the Ganymeans have left the Solar System in search of survivors of their kind, at a possible colony identified in ancient Lunarian star maps. Shortly after their departure, strange faster-than-light messages begin being transmitted to Earth—in English, revealing that humanity has been under surveillance for some time. Confusingly, the messages also reveal that their senders' understanding of the situation on Earth is seriously flawed, and that they are not the surveilling party, whose notice they are attempting to avoid. Earth governments react to the messages with a reversion to factionalism, with the US and USSR attempting to establish separate lines of communication with the senders in hopes of obtaining advanced technology. Unlike the preceding entries in the series, this is something of a thriller, with political subterfuge and a seeming resurrection of the Cold War.

== Timeline ==
The series presents a prehistory of the Solar System, stretching back millions of years. This was further expanded in later books to include an alternate timeline version of the setting, which included an elaborate fictional chronology:

- 25 million years ago: Intelligence arises in the Solar System on the planet Minerva (see Phaeton (hypothetical planet) for discussion of a similar idea), in the form of the "Giants". Minerva is orbited by one moon and orbits the Sun between Mars and Jupiter.
- Between 25 million and 4 million years ago: Carbon dioxide levels in the Minervan atmosphere begin to rise. As the Giants have a low tolerance for carbon dioxide, they send a scientific team to the star called Iscaris to perform experiments to aid in their understanding of the situation. The experimentation destabilizes the star, causing a nova. The team attempts to flee on their starship Shapieron which is unable to decelerate due to a malfunction, forcing them to orbit the Solar System at relativistic velocities, experiencing one year for every million that pass. After the events at Iscaris, the Ganymeans bring in animals and hominids from Earth in the hope of isolating the gene responsible for carbon dioxide tolerance. However, they fear the effects of using this gene in themselves and are forced to flee to the distant planet of Thurien, in orbit around the "Giants' Star". They leave behind relays so that they can continue to observe Minerva and their evacuation is mostly successful, though one of their ships crashes on Ganymede.
- Approximately 100,000 years ago: hominids left behind on Minerva after genetic experimentation evolve into the Minervans—modern humans.
- Between 100,000 and 50,000 years ago: An ice age begins on Minerva, threatening to destroy the new human civilization. Humanity begins a space program in an attempt to escape the planet and migrate to Earth. This leads to conflict and an arms race between the inhabitants of Minerva's two continents, democratic Cerios and autocratic Lambia, over control of the program.
- From 50,020 to 50,000 years ago: The Jevlenese Imares Broghuilio and his generals appear via a time loop from the future in a fleet of five starships. Cerian president Harzin and Lambian king Perasmon declare the end of the arms race and the demilitarization of the two continents. Prince Freskel-Gar Engred is secretly aided by the Jevlenese in his plan to assassinate Perasmon and Harzin, and ascends the throne of Lambia. Under his rule, military development is restarted with contributions from Jevlenese technology. Broghuilio removes Freskel-Gar and installs himself as dictator, renaming himself Zargon. In turn, he too is replaced by Xerasky.
- 50,000 years ago: After years of hostilities, total nuclear warfare finally breaks out between Cerios and Lambia on Minerva and at the Cerian base on Minerva's moon. The Thuriens intervene but are too late: Minerva is shattered, forming Pluto and the asteroid belt while its moon is captured by Earth—which originally had no moon—becoming the planet's familiar satellite. The Cerian survivors ask to be transported down onto Earth but the gravitational stresses of the Moon being captured by Earth throw their civilization back to the Stone Age and, to survive, they are forced to wipe out the native Neanderthals before attempting to rebuild. The Lambian survivors are resettled on the planet of Jevlen, near Thurien, in an attempt to reintegrate them into society. They set up the supercomputer of JEVEX to run their affairs, modelled after the Thurien computer VISAR.
- C. 50,000 years to the 19th century: The Jevlenese move JEVEX to the planet of Uttan so that their researchers can increase its power without the knowledge of the Thuriens. Unknown to both parties, a pocket universe forms within JEVEX, the Entoverse. Some of its sapient inhabitants ("Ents"), who go by the title of ayatollahs, devise the ability to pass over to the original universe by taking over the minds of the Jevlenese. The Thuriens begin to trust the Jevlenese and contract them with the task of observing human civilization. Still driven by hatred of their old rivals, the Jevlenese set about hindering human progress.
- 19th century: In their attempt to destroy humanity, the Jevlenese begin to promote weapons research. In 1831, the Ent Sykha founds the Spiral of Awakening cult.
- From 1939 to 1945: The Jevlenese orchestrate World War II, believing that it will result in mutual nuclear annihilation.
- Post 1945: Earth begins a nuclear arms race after World War II, in accordance with the Jevlenese plan. Meanwhile, the Jevlenese leaders secretly build up their own stocks of weapons.
- 1979: Birth of Joseph B. Shannon.
- 1992: Birth of Victor Hunt.
- 1999: Birth of Lyn Garland and Duncan Watt.
- 2002: Birth of Hans Baumer.
- 2015: With the looming threat of the Nucleonic bomb, the Cold War ends and the United Nations Space Arm (UNSA) is formed to promote peace and stability. Jevlenese agents help to demilitarize Earth, though to isolate Thurien they continue to claim that Earth is on the brink of World War III.
- 2027: Humanity begins to explore space once more. A UNSA mission finds a 50,000-year-old Cerian corpse, nicknamed Charlie, on the Moon. Scientists Victor Hunt and Christian Danchekker investigate the "Lunarians" (beginning of Inherit the Stars).
- 2028: The former existence of Minerva is deduced. UNSA Expedition Jupiter 4 discovers the crashed Giants' starship on Ganymede and name the race the "Ganymeans".
- 2029: Humanity reconstructs the full story of the Lunarians and the Ganymeans, discovers that the Moon was once Minerva's moon and finally realizes that Earthmen are the descendants of the Lunarians originating on Minerva (end of Inherit the Stars).
- 2030: The crew of the Shapieron have slowed down and re-enter the Solar System where they contact Humanity. They stay for six months but, rather than be alone in the universe, they set out once more to find the "Giant's Star". Humanity learns that their intelligence was an unintentional byproduct of the unsuccessful genetic experimentation of the Giants. The Jevlenese observers decline to inform Thurien of the reappearance of the Shapieron. Thurien learns of the Shapieron from a radio message sent by Earth (events of The Gentle Giants of Ganymede).
- 2031: Unbeknownst to Jevlen, the Thuriens make radio contact with Earth and uncover the Jevlenese deception. Earth and Thurien unite against Jevlen, switching off JEVEX. Imares Broghuilio and his generals attempt to escape from Jevlen but are accidentally transferred into the past of another segment of the Multiverse, near the Minerva of 50,020 years before, in the process proving the Many-worlds interpretation. This discovery allows the Thuriens to begin to investigate the possibility of cross-Multiversal transfer. The now free Jevlen is on the brink of becoming a peaceful society when the deactivation of JEVEX causes the Ents to attempt an escape from the Entoverse. The ayatollah Eubeleus travels to Uttan, planning to switch JEVEX back on so that the Ents can flood into Jevlenese minds but is stopped by a coalition of humans and Thuriens, who isolate JEVEX on Uttan, preserving the Entoverse (events of Giant's Star and Entoverse).
- 2033: Victor Hunt is contacted by a version of himself from another segment of the Multiverse. A group of Terran and Thurien scientists invent the Multiporter, enabling cross-multiversal travel. (beginning of Mission to Minerva)
- 2034: The Terrans and Thuriens on the Shapieron multiport to the 50,020-year past of the alternate universe in the Minerva Mission, an attempt to prevent the destruction of Minerva in that segment of the Multiverse and to initiate a new line of history. The Mission to Minerva proves successful and the Shapieron returns to its own universe (end of Mission to Minerva).

Events in the alternate chronology are identical up to 50,020 years ago. In this chronology, the Minerva Mission used timeline lensing generated by the Shapieron to cause the Jevlenese to disappear from the alternate timeline universe without a trace. Cerios and Lambia gave up the conflict and disarmed to concentrate on a space program for their mutual benefit. The Shapieron then returned to its own universe.

== Reception ==
The reception of the series has been divided; the original trilogy is generally well received, while the later books have been seen as unnecessary additions, suffering from many of the faults of Hogan's later work. In John Clute's article on Hogan's work, he first considered Inherit the Stars, noting "the exhilarating sense it conveys of scientific minds at work on real problems and ... the genuinely exciting scope of the sf imagination it deploys." However, he described the magical aspects of the Entoverse as "nonsense" and complained that the attempted rescue of Minerva was unsatisfying, adding that there was a "willingness on Hogan's part to re-activate sequences that had come to a natural halt." However, he concluded that "the sequence as a whole remains his best work."

James Nicoll remembered enjoying Inherit the Stars when he was a teenager but he had stopped reading the sequence after the first three books, as "[n]othing I have heard about Entoverse (the one I missed) makes me want to hunt it down." He went on to write a derisive early review of Mission to Minerva, where he concluded that "[o]verall, there was an ok novella trying to escape from this. Nothing in this book beyond the identity of the author required it to be so very, very bad."

In 1981, Inherit the Stars won the Seiun Award for Best Foreign Language Novel of the Year and Entoverse went on to win the 1994 Seiun Award in the same category. A manga adaptation by Yukinobu Hoshino was published in 2011–2012 in Japan, which won the Seiun Award of Comics category in 2013.

Shusuke Kaneko and Kazunori Ito, the director and the writer of the "Heisei Gamera Trilogy", were impressed by the series, and their Gamera: Guardian of the Universe (1995) was presumably influenced by the Hogan's work.
