= Prosumer =

Person who consumes and produces a product

A prosumer is an individual who both consumes and produces. The term is a portmanteau of the words producer and consumer. Research has identified six types of prosumers: DIY prosumers, self-service prosumers, customizing prosumers, collaborative prosumers, monetised prosumers, and economic prosumers.

== Definitions and contexts ==
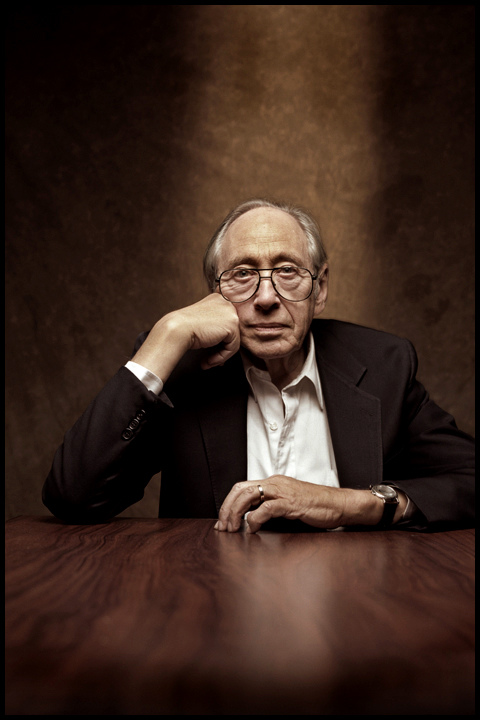
Alvin Toffler, coiner of the term "prosumer"

Alvin Toffler coined the phrase "prosumption" to describe the practice of people producing their own goods and services in the digital age, thereby functioning as both the producer and the consumer. For example, the prosumption of internet literature is often based in a community whose members participate as readers, provide feedback for writers, and write themselves, as in the instance of Morning Star of Lingao.

In the field of renewable energy, prosumers are households or organisations which at times produce surplus fuel or energy and feed it into a national (or local) distribution network; whilst at other times (when their fuel or energy requirements outstrip their own production of it) they consume that same fuel or energy from that grid. This is widely done by households by means of photovoltaic panels on their roofs generating electricity. Such households may additionally make use of battery storage to increase their share of self-consumed PV electricity, referred to as prosumage in the literature.

The sharing economy is another context where individuals can act as prosumers. For example, in the sharing economy, individuals can be providers (e.g., Airbnb hosts, Uber drivers) and consumers (e.g., Airbnb guests, and Uber passengers). Prosumers are one avenue to grow the sharing economy.

Scholars have connected prosumer culture to the concept of McDonaldization, as advanced by sociologist George Ritzer. Referring to the business model of McDonald's, which has emphasized efficiency for management while getting customers to invest more effort and time themselves (such as by cleaning up after themselves in restaurants), McDonaldization gets prosumers to perform more work without paying them for their labor.

== Origins and development ==
To reach a high degree of customization, consumers would have to take part in the production process especially in specifying design requirements. In a sense, this is merely an extension or broadening of the kind of relationship that many affluent clients have had with professionals like architects for many decades. However, in many cases architectural clients are not the only or even primary end-consumers.

Toffler has extended these and many other ideas well into the 21st century. Along with more recently published works such as Revolutionary Wealth (2006), one can recognize and assess both the concept and fact of the prosumer as it is seen and felt on a worldwide scale. That these concepts are having a global impact and reach, however, can be measured in part by noting in particular, Toffler's popularity in China. Discussing some of these issues with Newt Gingrich on C-SPAN's After Words program in June 2006, Toffler mentioned that The Third Wave is the second ranked bestseller of all time in China, just behind a work by Mao Zedong.

Toffler's Prosumption was well described and expanded in economic terms by Philip Kotler, who saw them as a new challenge for marketers. Kotler anticipated that people will also want to play larger role in designing certain goods and services they consume, furthermore modern computers will permit them to do it. He also described several forces that would lead to more prosumption like activities, and to more sustainable lifestyles, that topic was further developed by Tomasz Szymusiak in 2013 and 2015 in two marketing books.

In July 2020, an academic description reported on the nature and rise of the "robot prosumer", derived from modern-day technology and related participatory culture, that, in turn, was substantially predicted earlier by science fiction writers.

== Criticism ==
Prosumer capitalism has been criticized as promoting "new forms of exploitation through unpaid work gamified as fun".

Academic Christian Fuchs writes that prosumption can be used to outsource work to users and consumers, who work without payment.

== See also ==
- Cost the limit of price – Version of the labor theory of value
- Creative consumer
- Electronics industry – Industry that focuses in the electronics production
- Participatory culture – Cultural production made through social interactions of different communities and groups
- Power user – User of advanced features in electronics
- Produsage – User-led content creation that takes place in a variety of online environments
- Read/write culture – Culture encouraging the creation of derivative works
