= Scarlet (color) =

Color shade of bright red

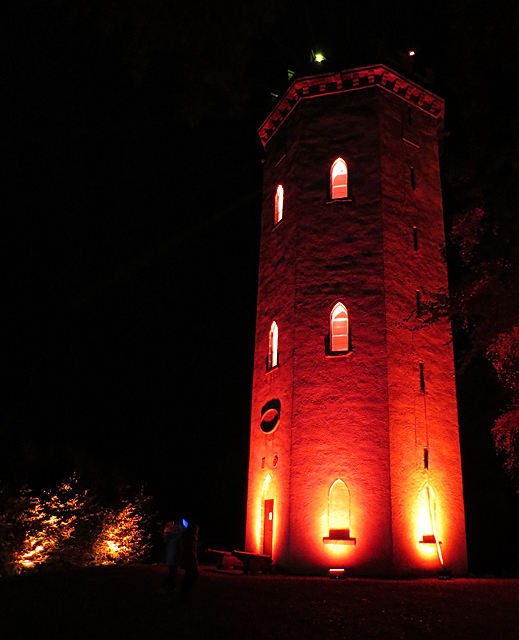
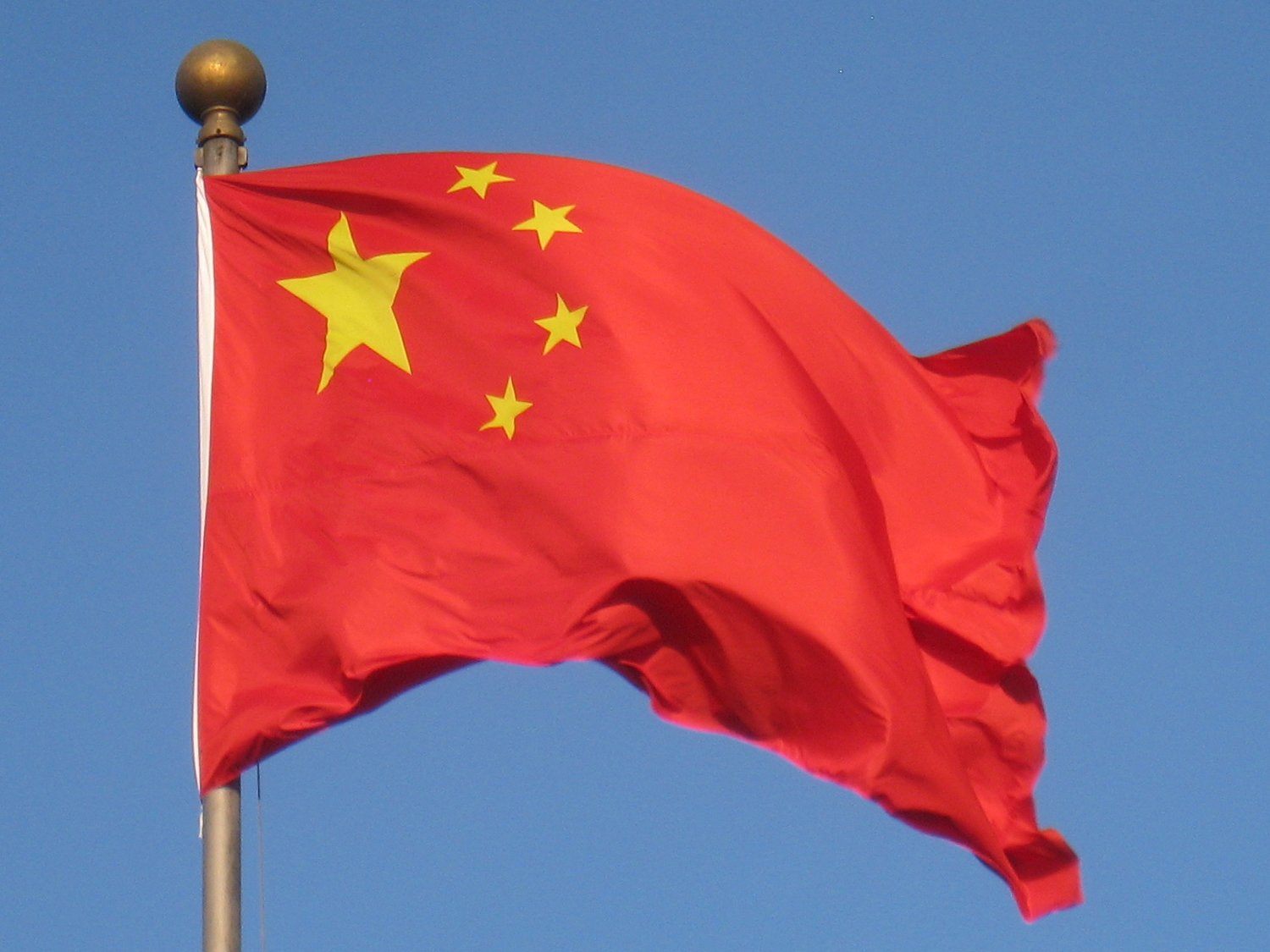
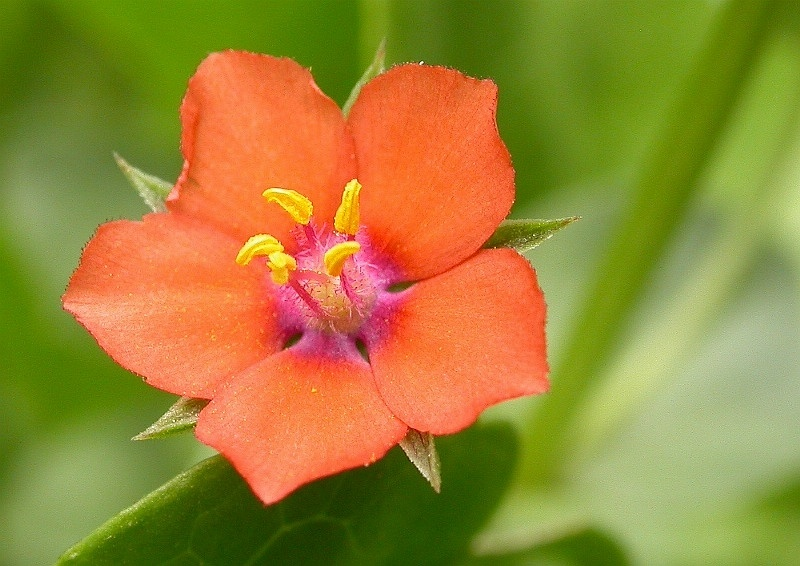
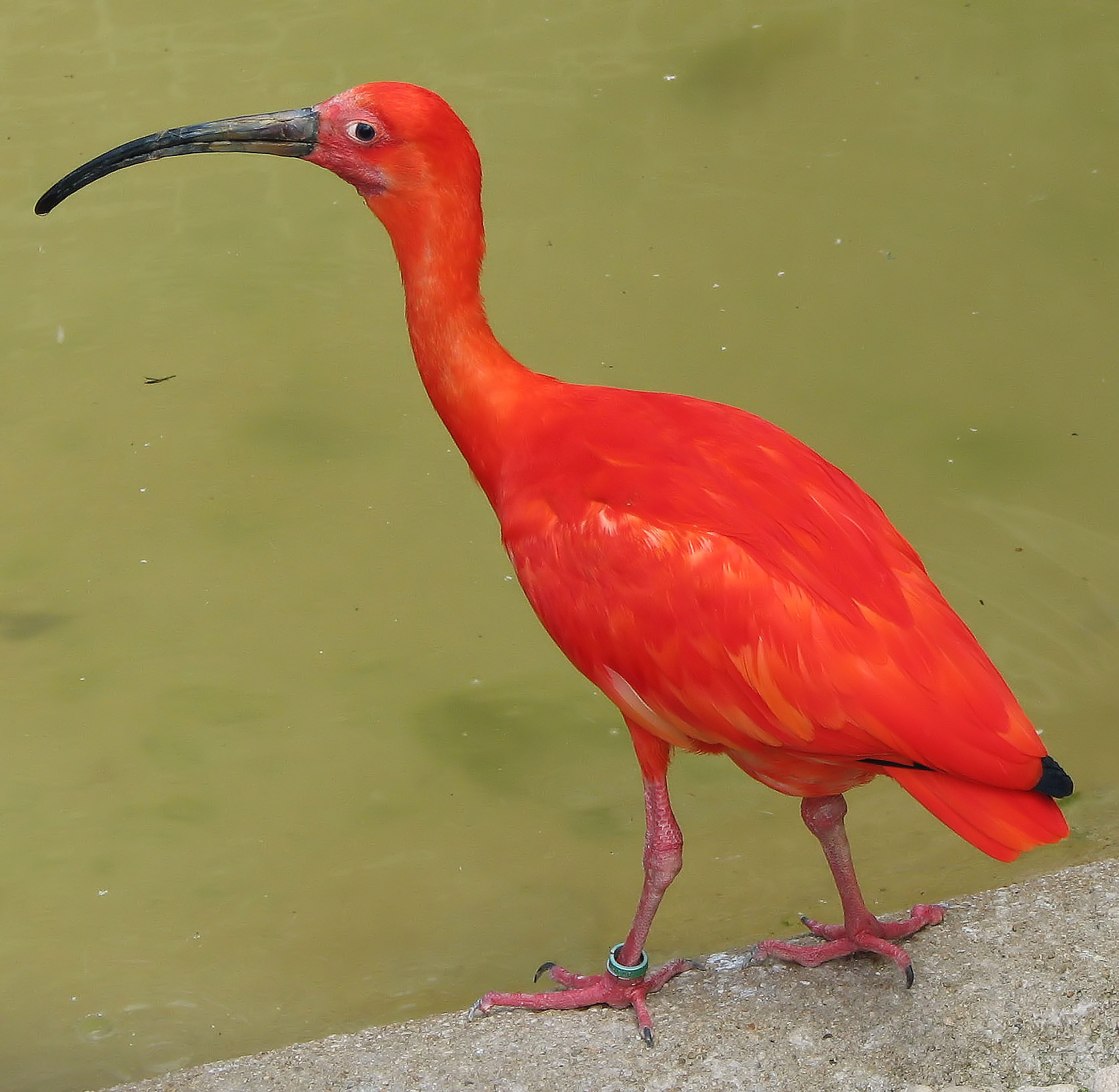
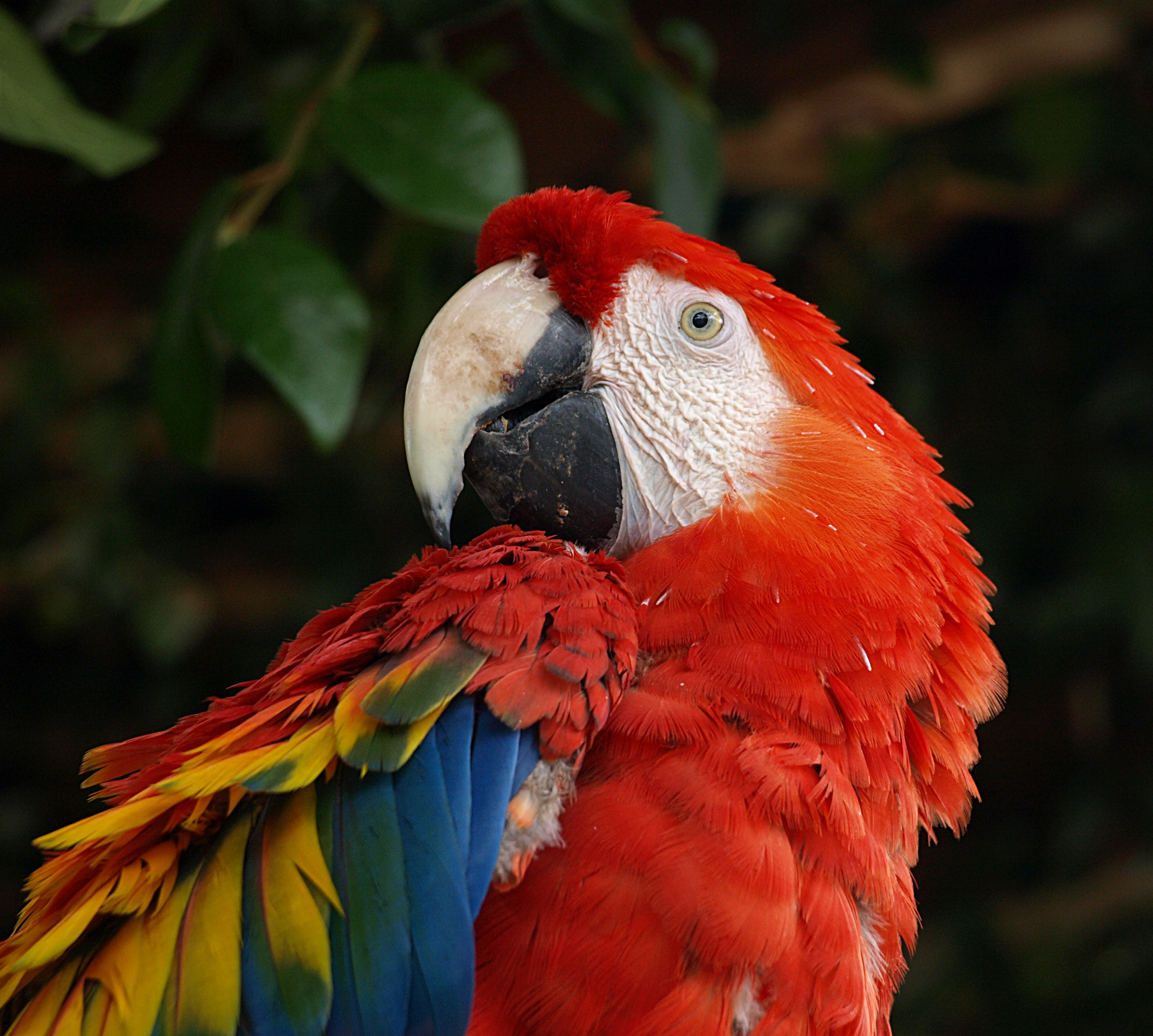
- Clockwise, from top left: An officer of the RCMP; Nelson's Tower in Forres; Scarlet pimpernel; Scarlet macaw; Scarlet ibis; The flag of China.

Color coordinates
- Hex triplet: #FF2000
- sRGB^{B} (r, g, b): (255, 32, 0)
- HSV (h, s, v): (8°, 100%, 100%)
- CIELCh_{uv} (L, C, h): (54, 173, 13°)
- Source: X11
- ISCC–NBS descriptor: Vivid reddish orange
- B: Normalized to [0–255] (byte)

Scarlet is a bright red color, sometimes with a slightly orange tinge. In the spectrum of visible light, and on the traditional color wheel, it is one-quarter of the way between red and orange, slightly less orange than vermilion.

According to research in Europe and the United States, scarlet and other bright shades of red are the colors most associated with courage, force, passion, heat, and joy. In the Roman Catholic Church, scarlet is the color worn by a cardinal, and is associated with the blood of Christ and the Christian martyrs, and with sacrifice.

Scarlet is also associated with immorality and sin, particularly prostitution or adultery, largely because of a passage referring to the "Great Harlot", "dressed in purple and scarlet", in Revelation 17:1–6 in the Bible.

== Etymology ==
The word comes from the Middle English "scarlat", from the Old French escarlate, from the Latin "scarlatum", from the Persian سقرلات saqerlât. The term scarlet was also used in the Middle Ages for a type of cloth that was often bright red. An early recorded use of scarlet as a color name in the English language dates to 1250.

== History ==
=== Ancient world ===
Scarlet has been a color of power, wealth, and luxury since ancient times. Scarlet dyes were first mentioned in the 8th century BC under the name Armenian Red, and they were described in Persian and Assyrian writings. The color was exported from Persia to Rome. During the Roman Empire, it was second in prestige only to the purple worn by the emperors. Roman officers wore scarlet cloaks called paludamenta, and persons of high rank were referred to as the coccinati ('people of red').

The color is also mentioned several times in the Hebrew Bible and the Christian Bible's Old and New Testaments. In the Latin Vulgate version of the book of Isaiah (1:18) it says, "If your sins be as scarlet (si fuerint peccata vestra ut coccinum) they shall be made white as snow", and the Christian book of Revelation (17:1-6) describes a "Great Harlot" (meretricius magnus) dressed in scarlet and purple (circumdata purpura et coccino) and riding a scarlet beast (besteam coccineam).

The Latin term for scarlet used in the Hebrew Bible comes from coccus ('tiny grain'). The finest scarlets in ancient times were made from a tiny scale insect (called a kermes), which fed on specific oak trees in Turkey, Persia, Armenia, and parts of the Middle East. The insects contained a very strong natural dye (also called "kermes"), which produced the scarlet color. The insects were so small they were historically thought to be a kind of grain. This was the origin of the expression "dyed in the grain."

=== Middle Ages and Renaissance ===
The early Christian church adopted many of the symbols of the Roman Empire, including the importance of the color scarlet. The flag of the Crusades was a scarlet cross on a white background, symbolizing blood and sacrifice. By a Roman Catholic edict in 1295, Cardinals of the church, second in authority to the Pope, wore red robes, albeit a red closer in color to the purple of the Byzantine Emperors—a color coming from the murex, a type of mollusk. After the Fall of Constantinople to the Turks in 1453, however, the imperial purple was no longer available, and Cardinals began instead to wear scarlet made from kermeses.

During the Middle Ages and the Renaissance, scarlet was the color worn by kings, princes, and the wealthy, partly because of its color and partly because of its high price. The exact shade, which varied widely, was less important than the brilliance and richness of the color. The finest scarlet, called scarlatto or Venetian scarlet, came from Venice, where it was made from kermes by a specific guild which closely guarded the formula. Cloths dyed scarlet cost as much as ten times as much as cloth dyed blue.

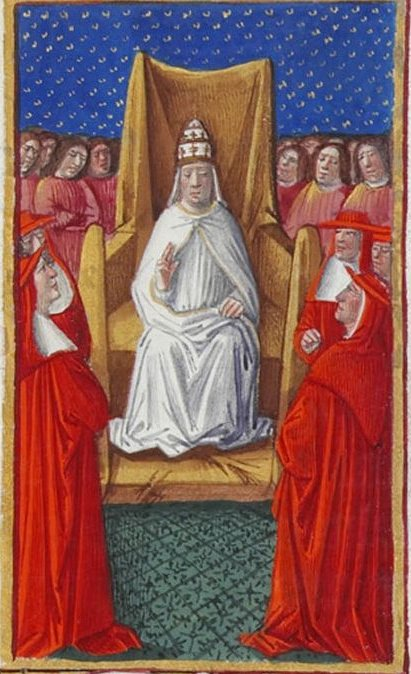
In the 15th century, Cardinals of the Roman Catholic Church wore scarlet robes dyed with kermes. Illustration from Les Tres Riches Heures du duc de Berry (1412–1416).

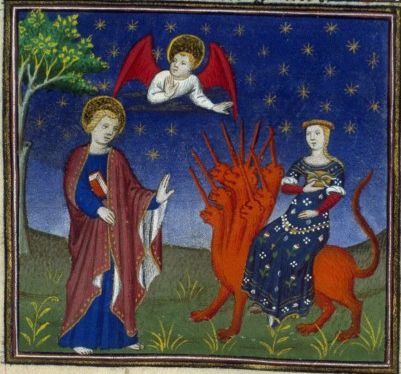
In the Middle Ages, scarlet also symbolized sin. The Whore of Babylon, depicted in a 14th-century French illuminated manuscript riding a scarlet beast. The woman appears attractive, but she is wearing a scarlet undergarment under her blue garment.

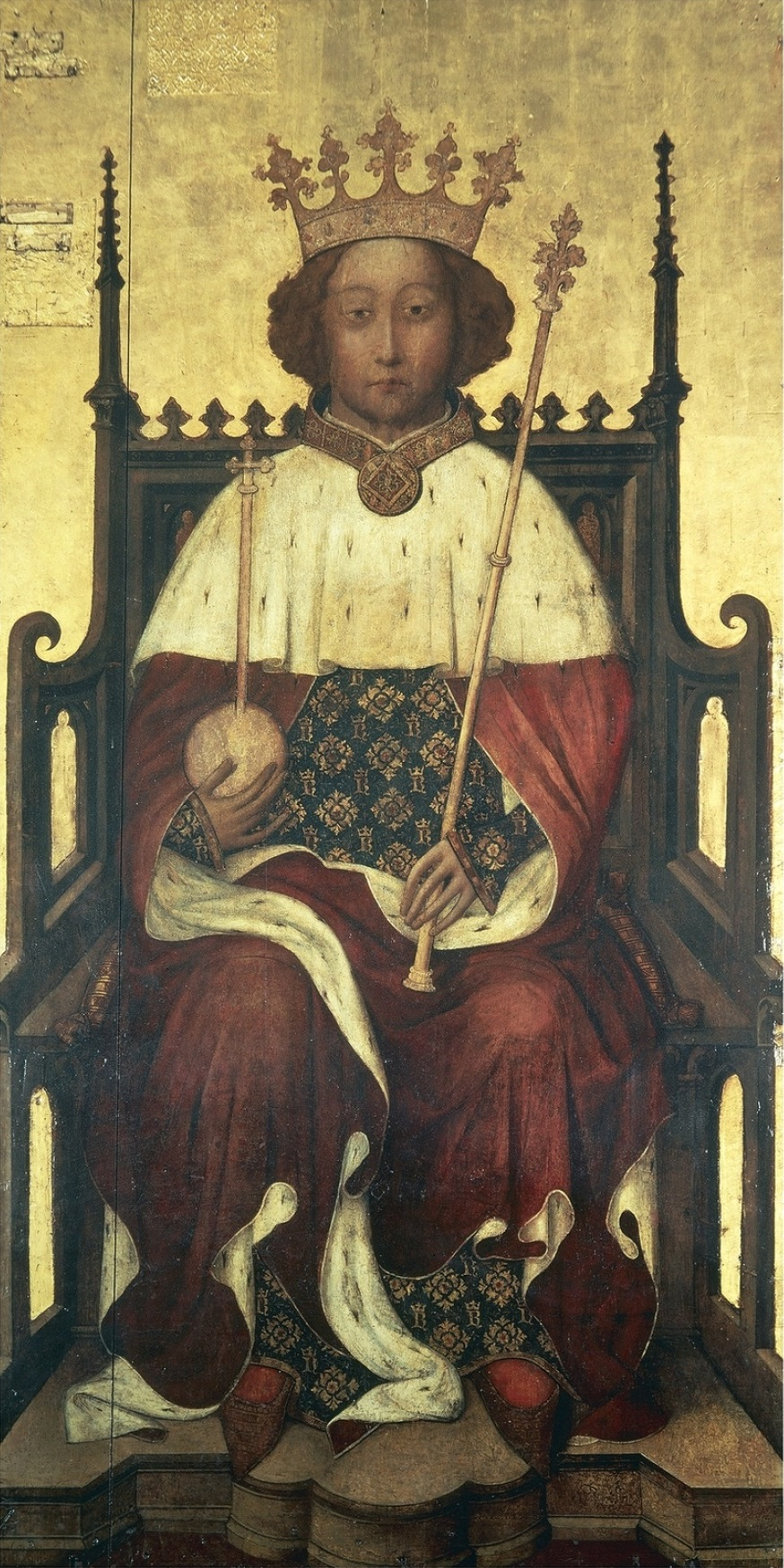
Scarlet was the color of royalty. Portrait of King Richard II of England (1390s).

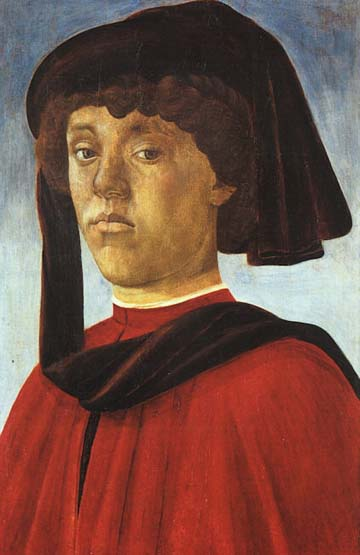
In the Renaissance, scarlet was the color of the Italian nobility. Portrait of a young man by Sandro Botticelli (1469).

=== 16th to 19th century ===
In the Assumption by Titian (1516–1518), the figures of God, the Virgin Mary and two apostles are highlighted by their scarlet costumes, painted with vermilion pigment from Venice. The young Queen Elizabeth I (here in about 1563) liked to wear bright reds, before she adopted the more sober image of the "Virgin Queen". Her satin gown was probably dyed with kermes. In the 16th century, an even more vivid scarlet began to arrive in Europe from the New World. When the Spanish conquistadores conquered Mexico, they found that the Aztecs were making brilliant red shades from another variety of scale insect called cochineal, similar to the European kermes vermiilo, but producing better shades of red at lower costs. The first shipments were sent from Mexico to Seville in 1523. The Venetian guilds at first tried to block the use of the cochineal in Europe, but before the century was over, it was being used to make scarlet dye in Spain, France, Italy, and Holland, and almost all the fine scarlet garments of Europe were made with cochineal.

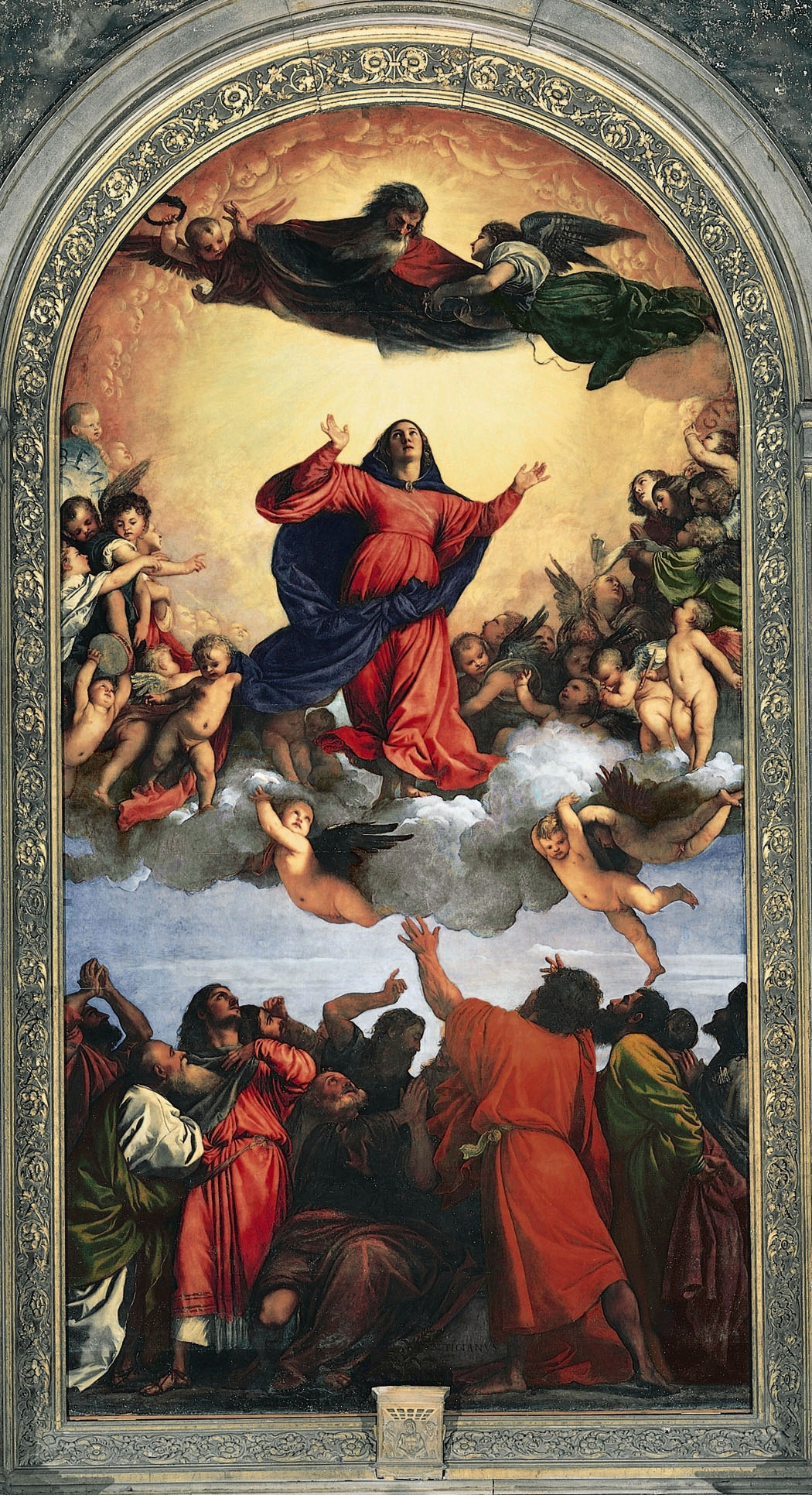
The Assumption, by Titian (1516–1518).

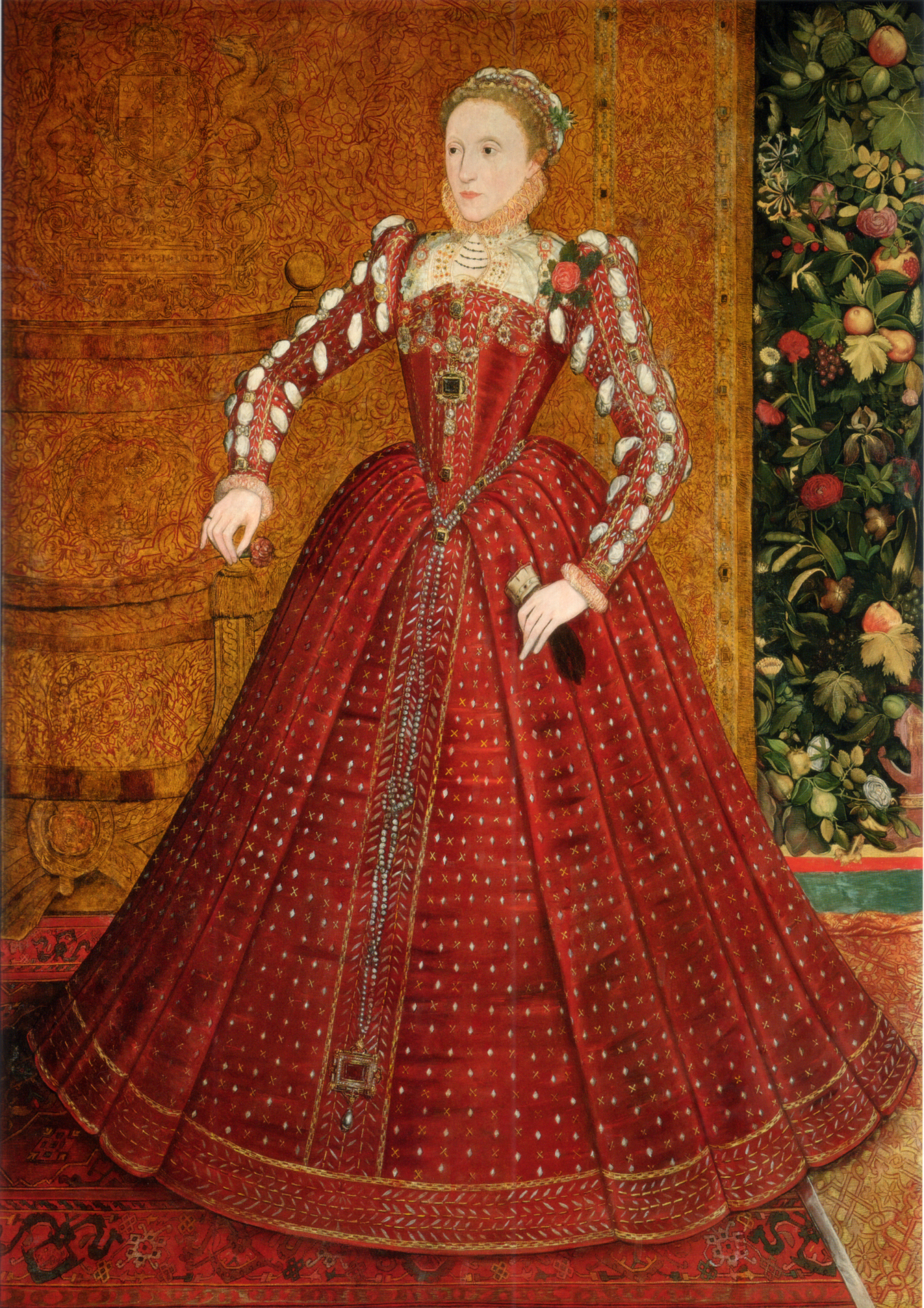
The young Queen Elizabeth I (here in about 1563)

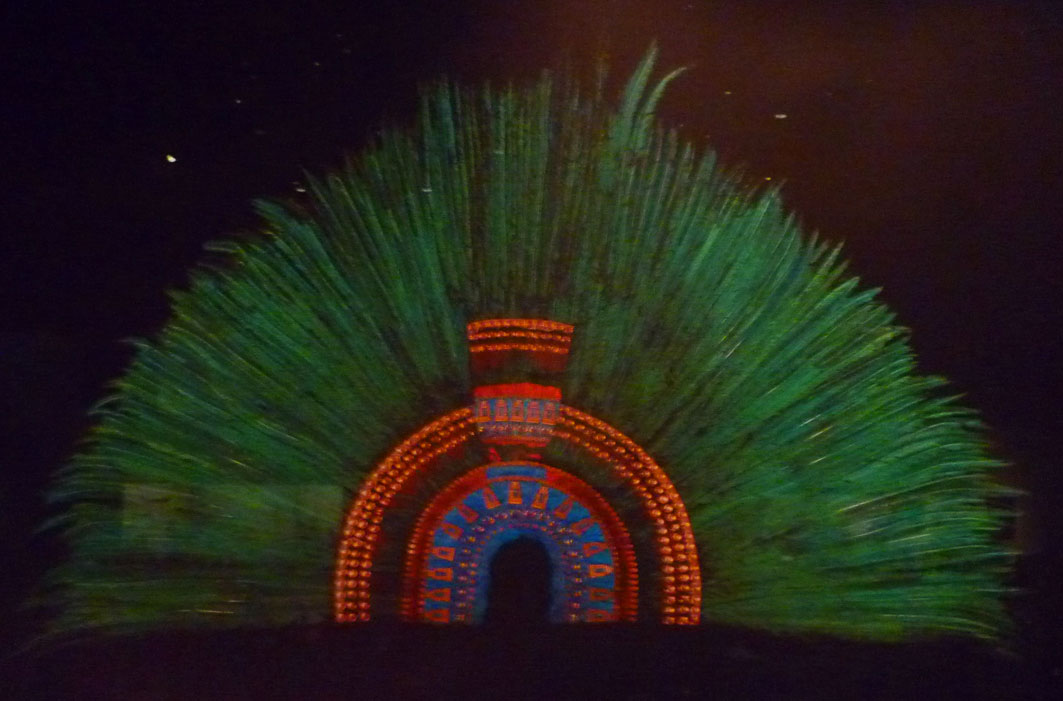
Dyed feather headdress from the Aztec people of Mexico and Central America. For red, they used cochineal, a brilliant scarlet dye made from insects.

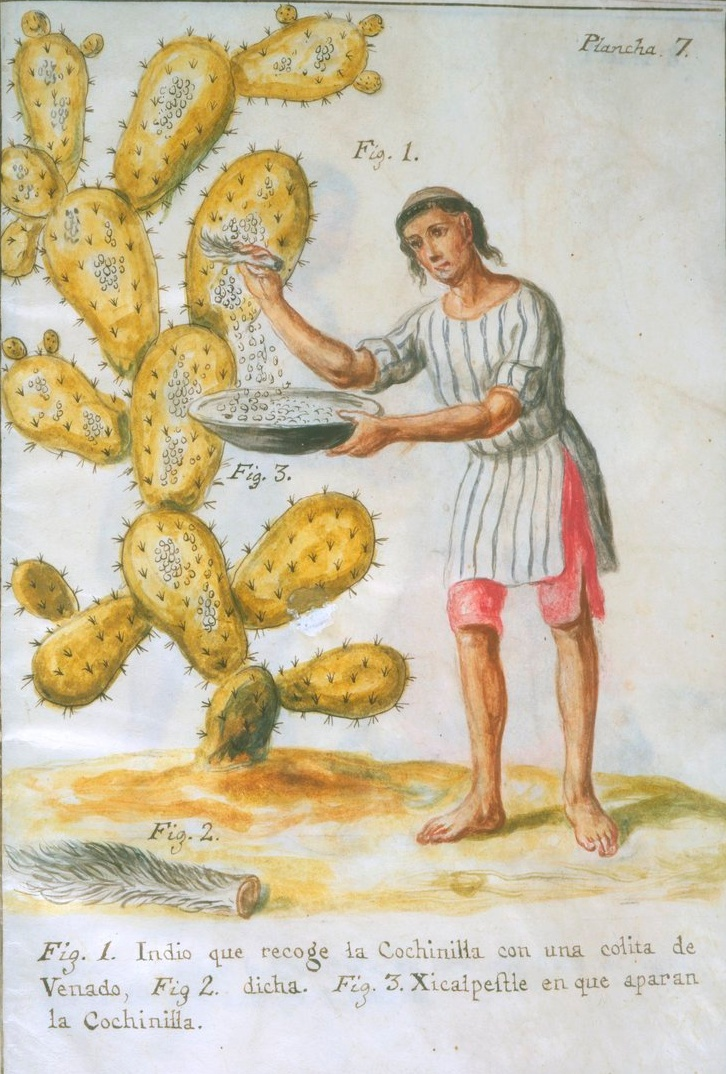
A native of Central America collecting cochineal insects from a cactus to make red dye (1777).

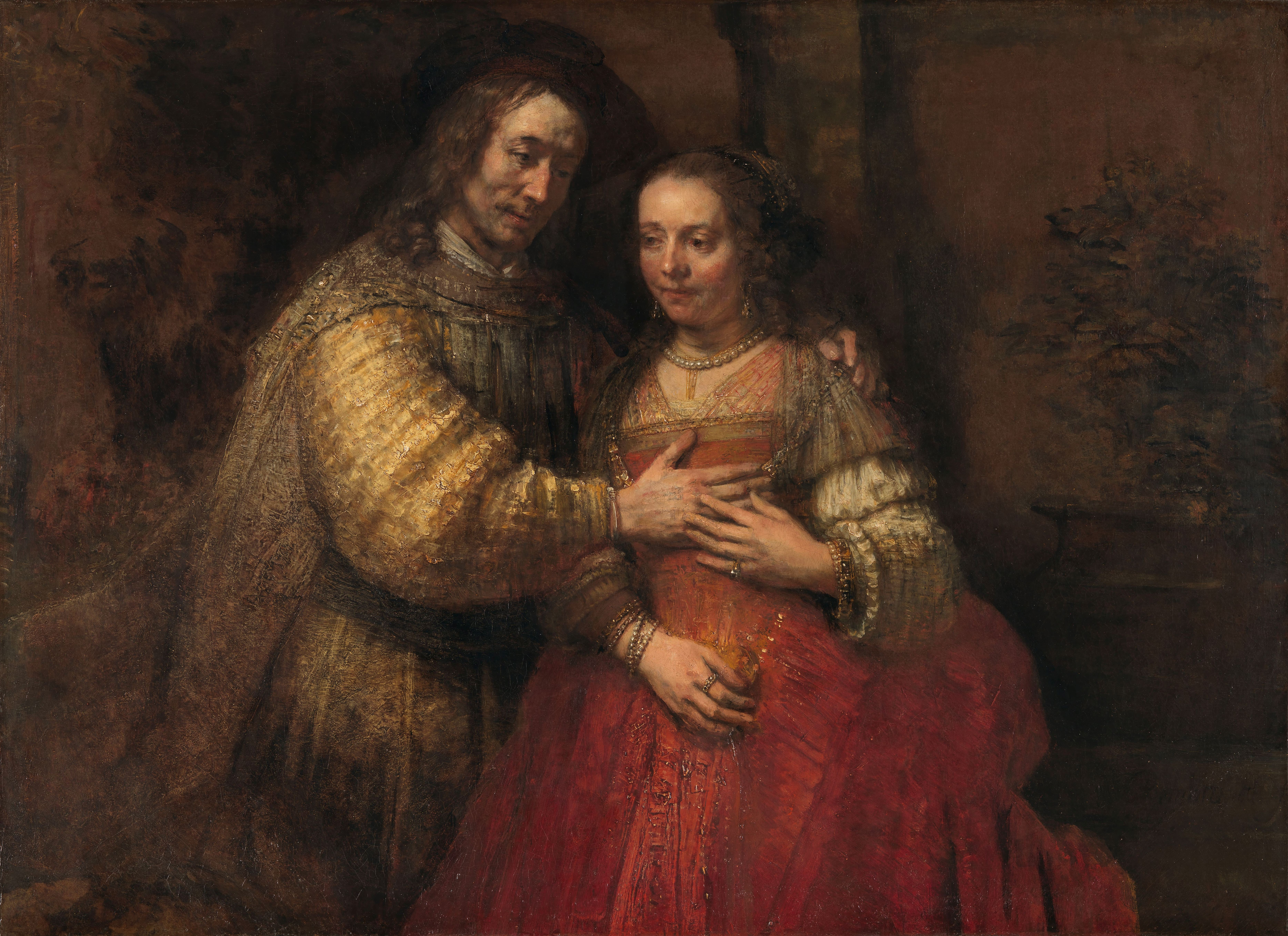
Rembrandt used carmine lake, made of cochineal, to paint the skirt of the bride in the painting known as "The Jewish bride" (1665–1669).

Scarlet was the traditional color of the British nobility in the 17th and 18th centuries. The members of the House of Lords wore red ceremonial gowns for the opening of Parliament, and today sit on red benches.

The red military uniform was adopted by the English New Model Army in 1645, and was still worn as a dress uniform until the outbreak of the First World War in August 1914. Ordinary soldiers wore red coats dyed with madder, while officers wore scarlet coats dyed with the more expensive cochineal. This led to British soldiers being known as red coats. After 1873, all ranks of the regiments wearing red tunics changed to the more vivid shade of scarlet.

The scarlet heels of the shoes of King Louis XIV of France were symbols of his royal status.

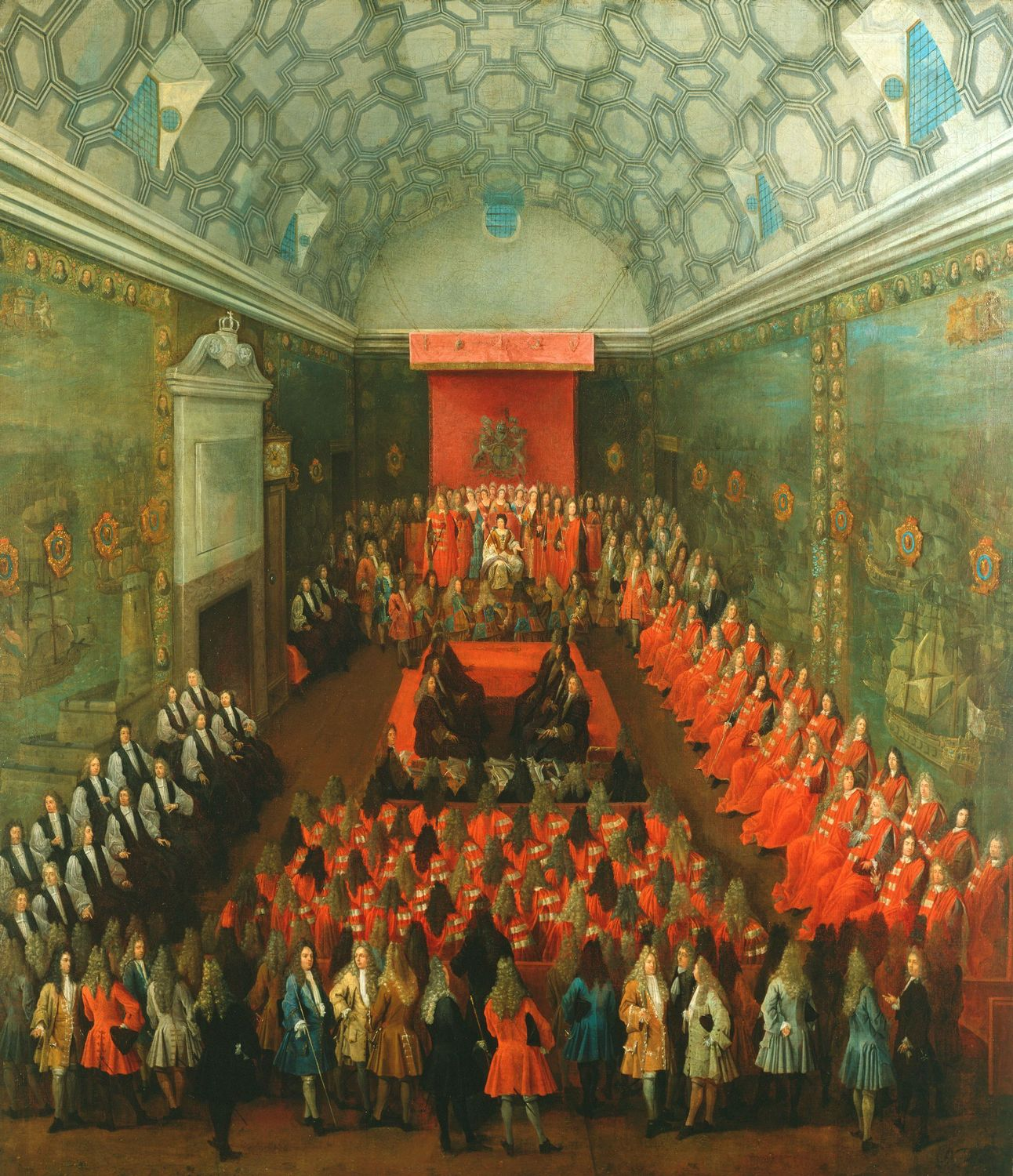
Scarlet is the traditional color of the British nobility. Queen Anne addresses the House of Lords (1708–1714), whose members wear their red ceremonial robes.

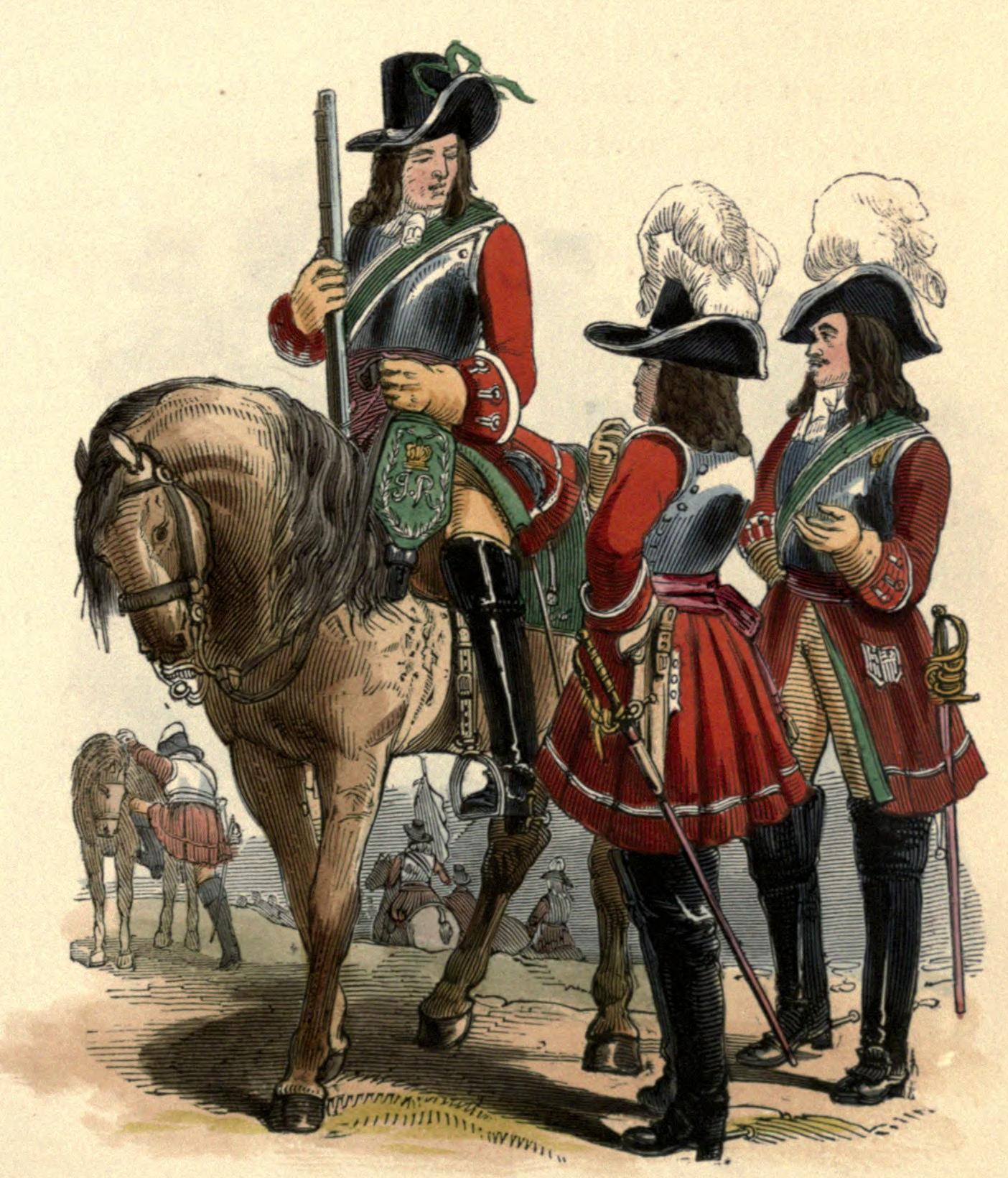
The uniform of the 4th Regiment of Horse (1687)

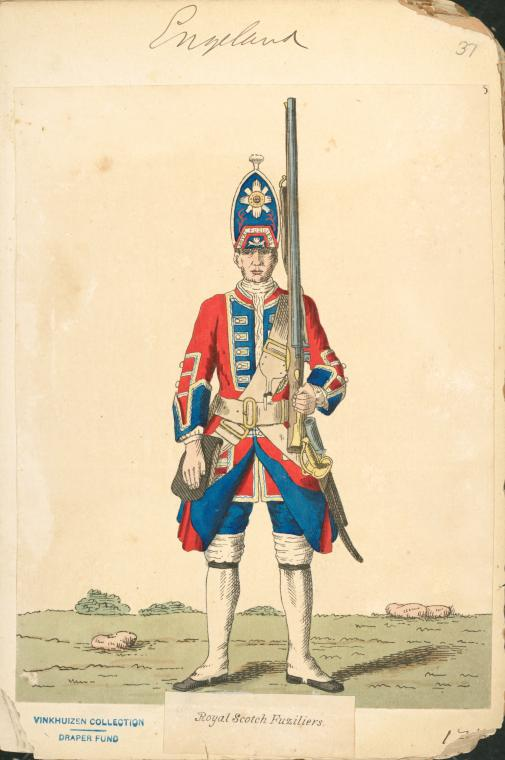
Uniform of the Royal Scotch Fusiliers (1742)

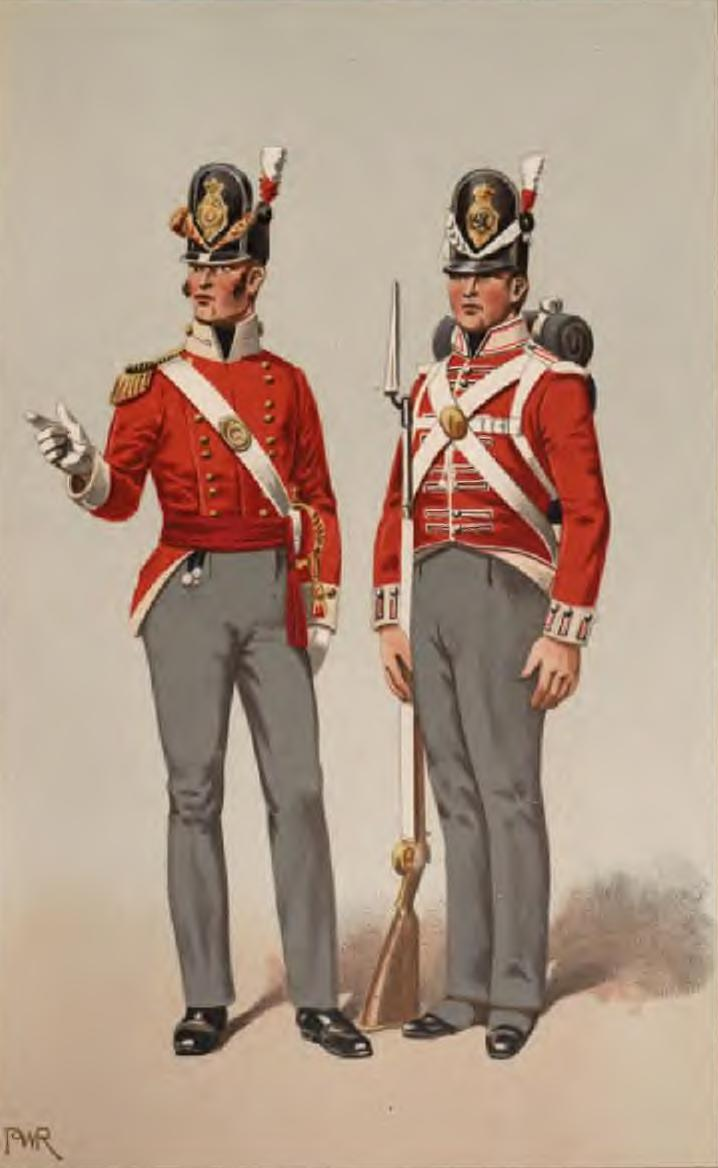
Officer and soldier of the British Army (1815).

=== 20th and 21st century ===
From the 8th century until the early 20th century, the most important scarlet pigment used in Western art was vermilion, made from the mineral cinnabar. It was used, along with red lake pigments, by artists from Botticelli and Raphael to Renoir. However, in 1919, commercial production began of an intense new synthetic pigment, cadmium red, made from cadmium sulfide and selenium. The new pigment became the standard red of Henri Matisse and the other important painters of the 20th century.

In the 20th century, scarlet also became associated with revolution. Red flags were first used as revolutionary emblems, symbolizing the blood of martyrs, during the French Revolution and the Paris uprisings in 1848. Red became the color of socialism, then communism, and became the color of the flags of both the Soviet Union and Communist China. China still uses a scarlet flag; in Chinese culture, red is also the color of happiness. Since the fall of the Soviet Union, the flag of Russia consists of red, blue, and white, the colors of the historic Russian flag from the time of Peter the Great, which he adapted from the colors of the flag of the Netherlands.

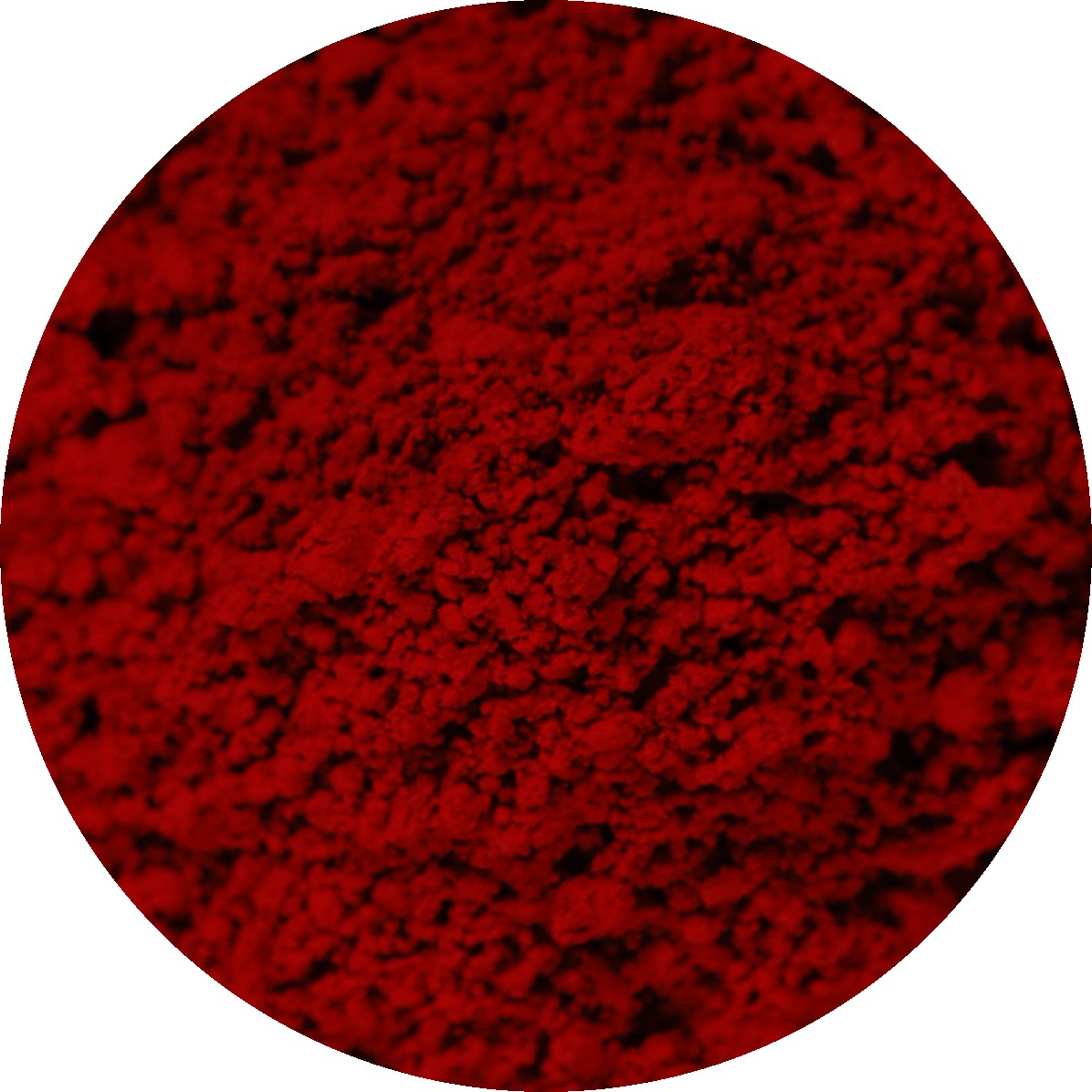
In the early 20th century, the vivid synthetic scarlet pigment cadmium red became the standard red of Henri Matisse and other Western artists.

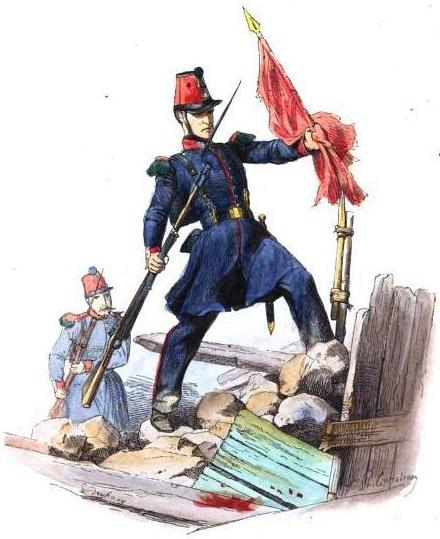
A French soldier takes down a red flag from the barricades during the Paris uprising of 1848.

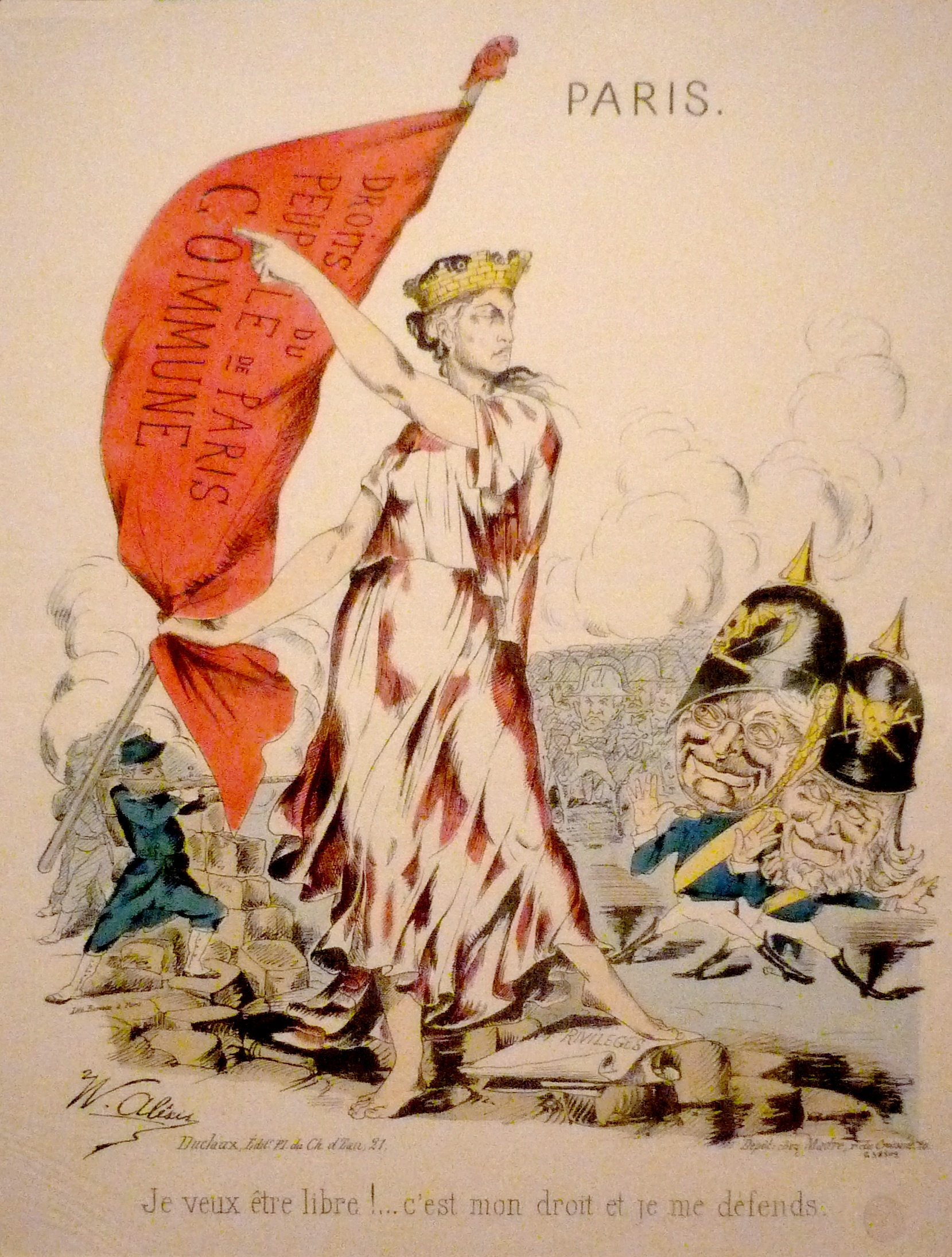
A poster from the Paris Commune (1871)

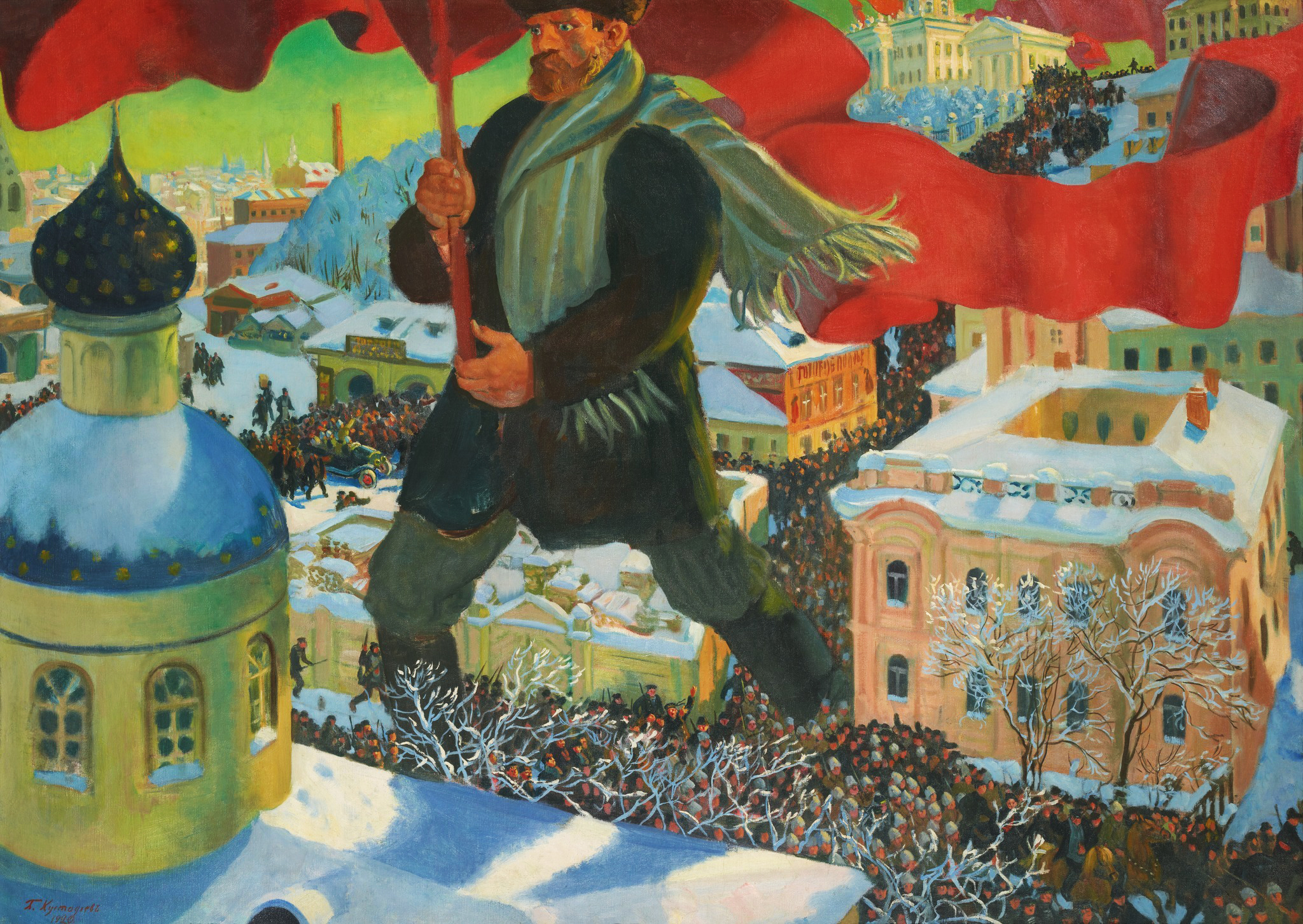
Red was the color of the Russian Revolution in 1917. The Bolshevik, painting by Boris Kustodiev (1920).

The flag of the Soviet Union (1923–1991). The hammer symbolized workers, the sickle represented peasants, and the red star symbolized the Communist Party.

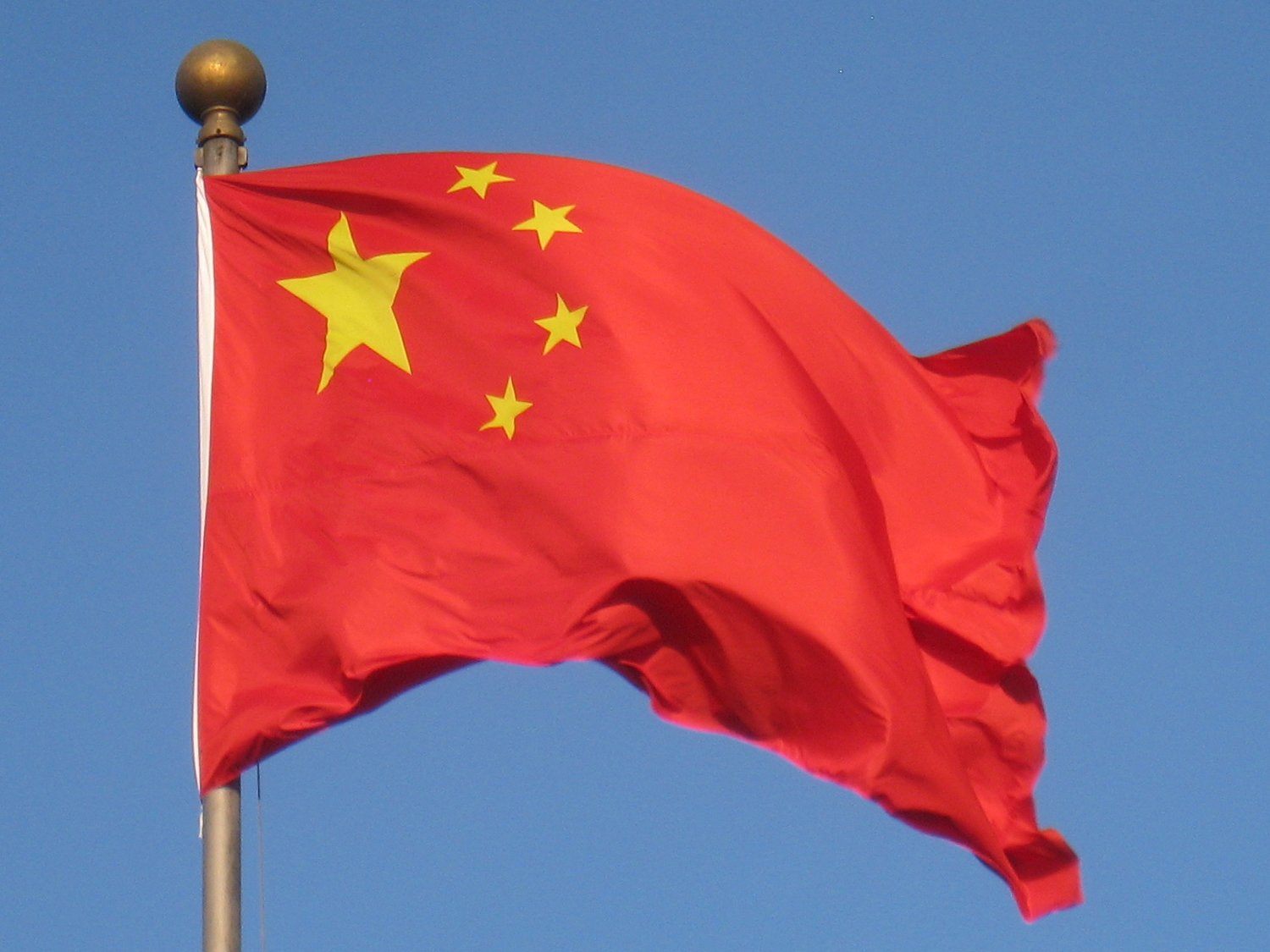
In China, scarlet is the color of both communism and happiness.

== In science and nature ==
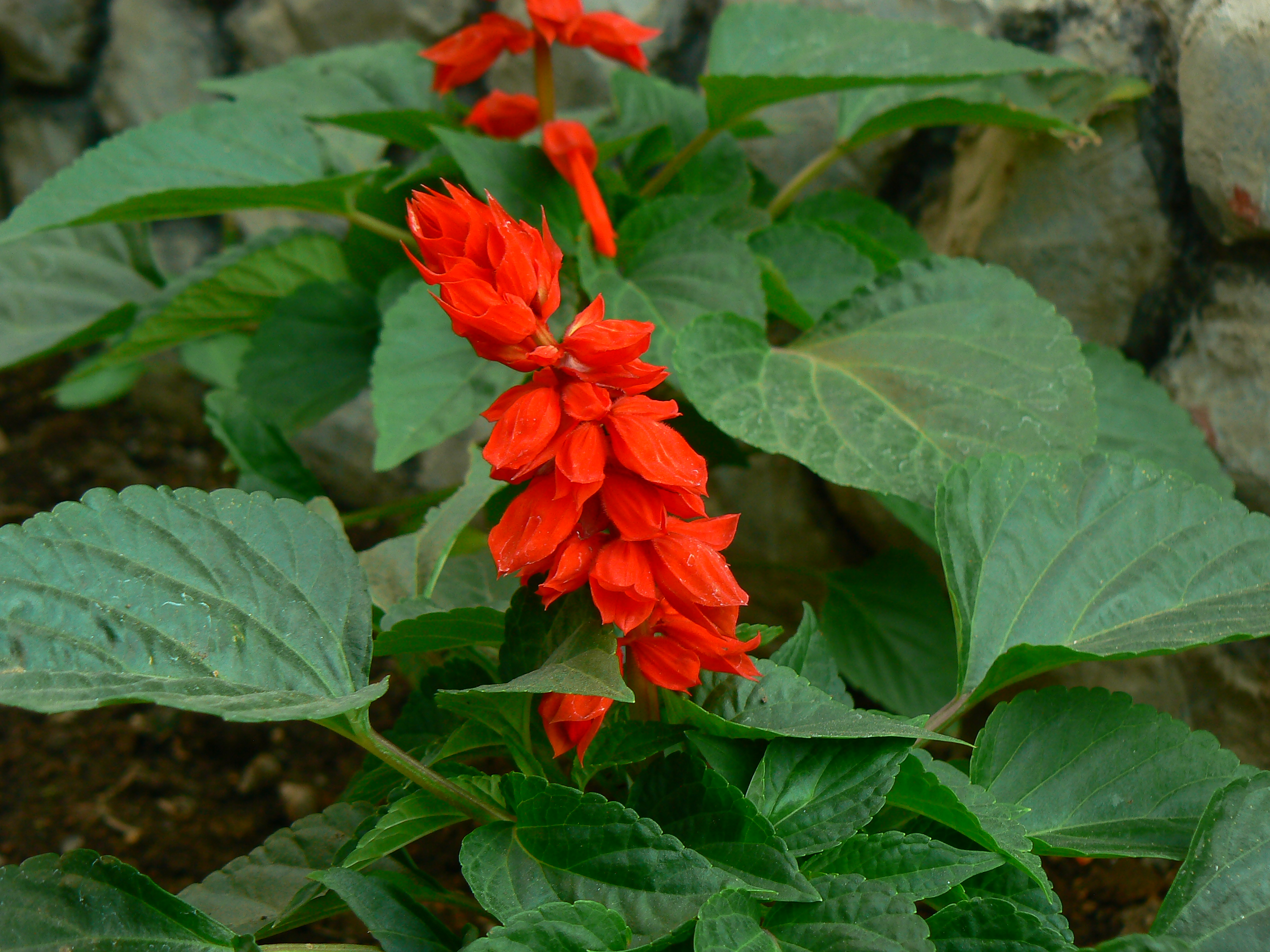
A salvia splendens Scarlet Sage

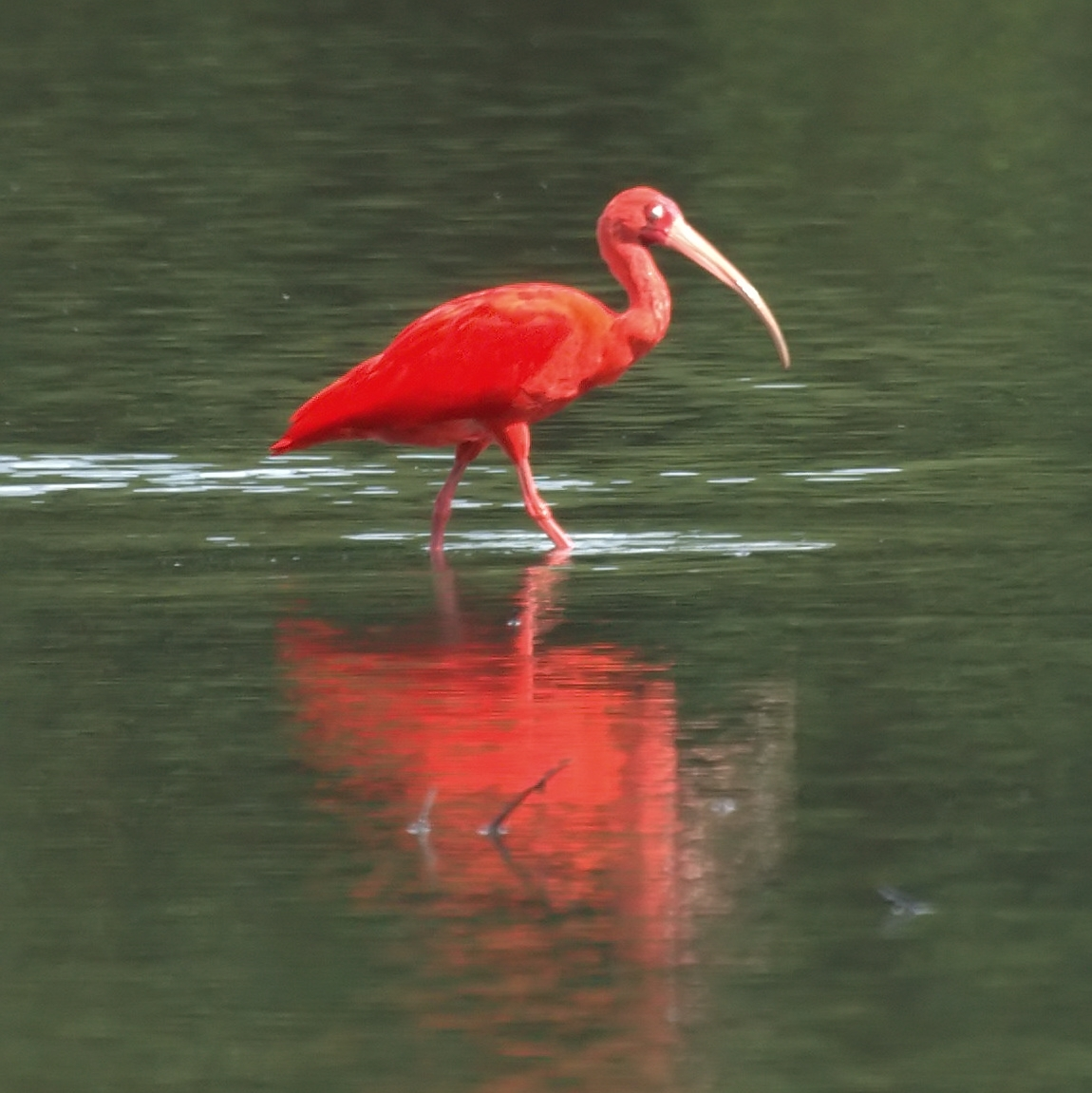
A scarlet ibis in Trinidad.

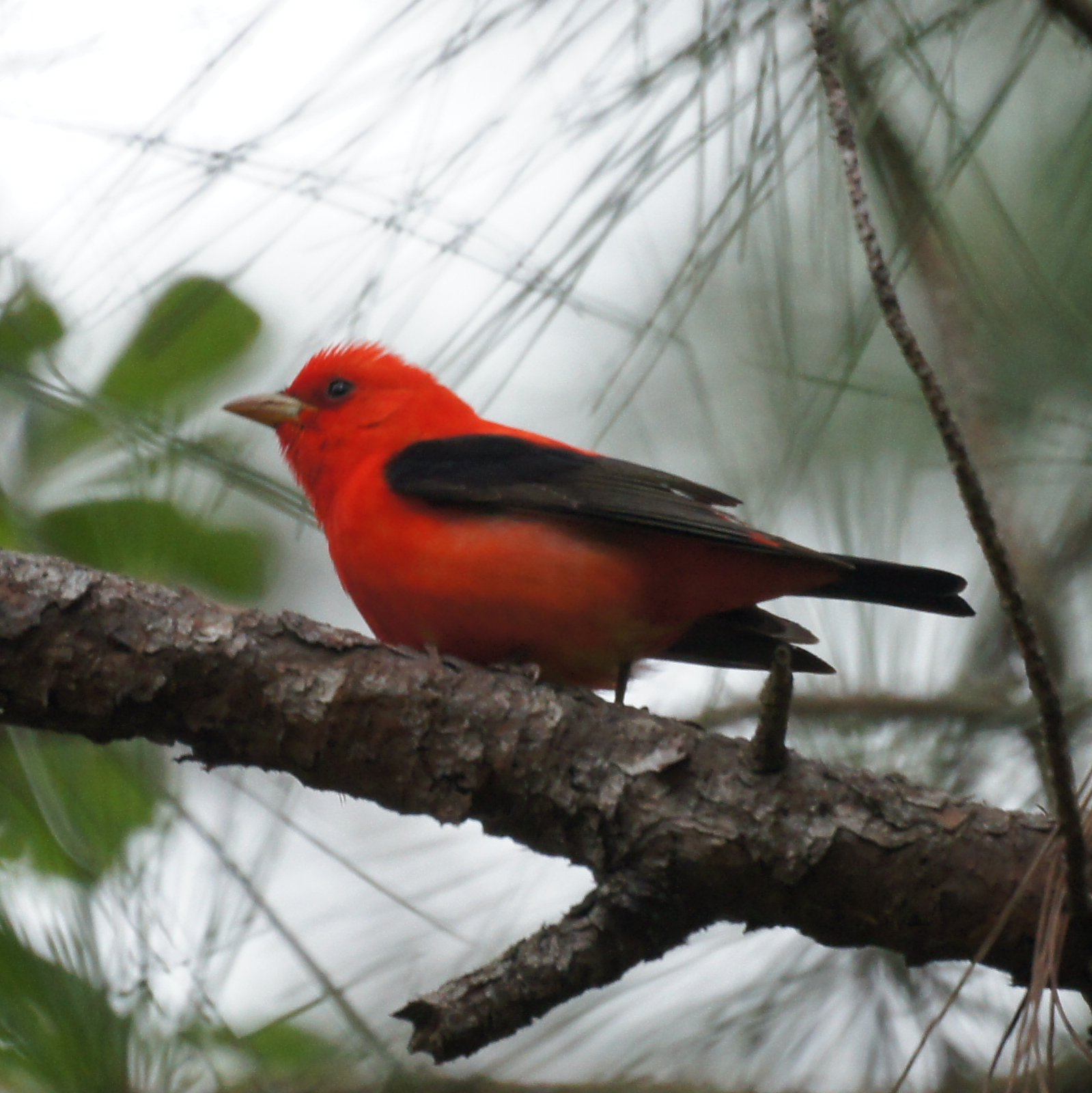
A scarlet tanager.

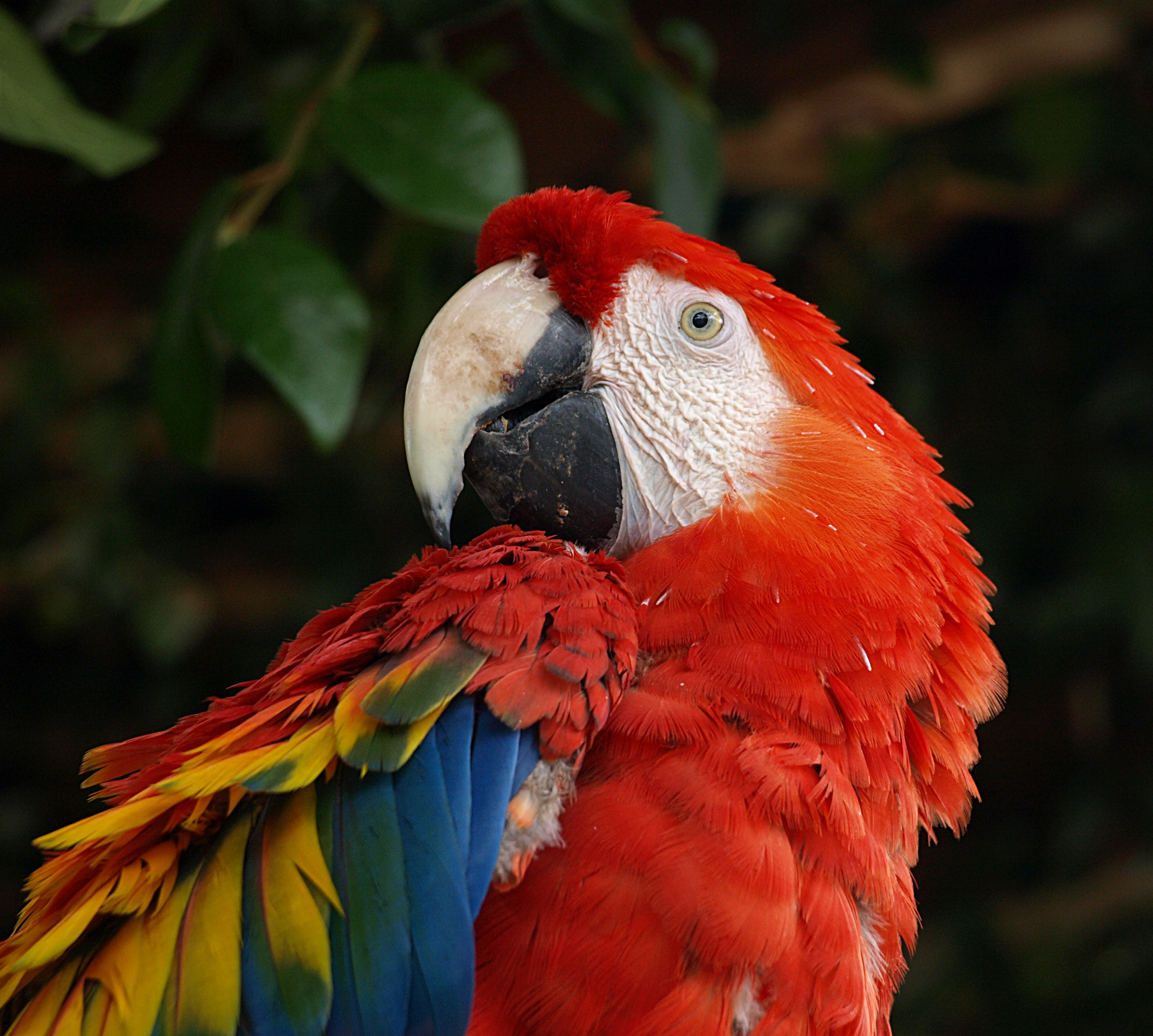
A scarlet macaw.

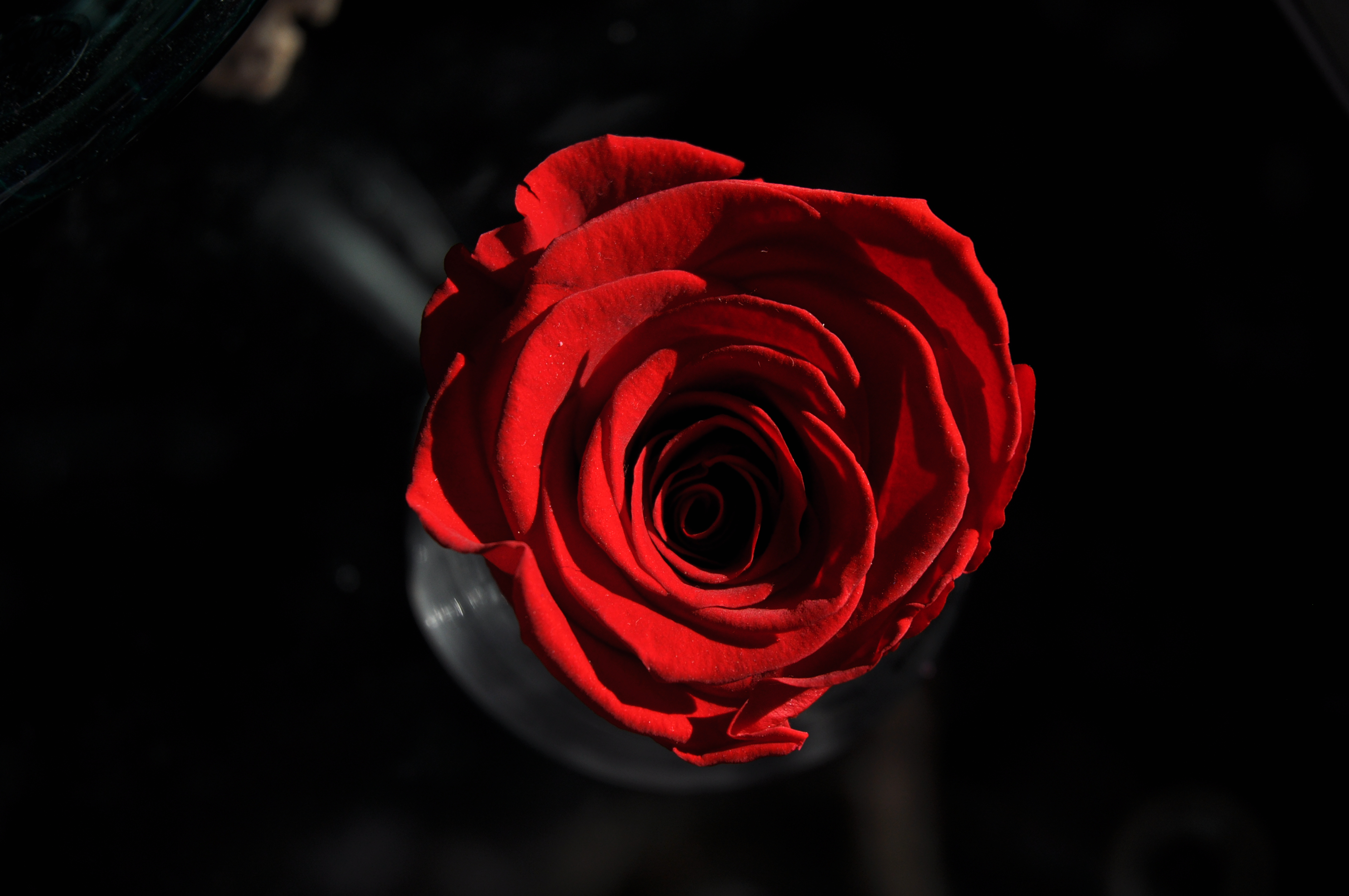
Scarlet rose

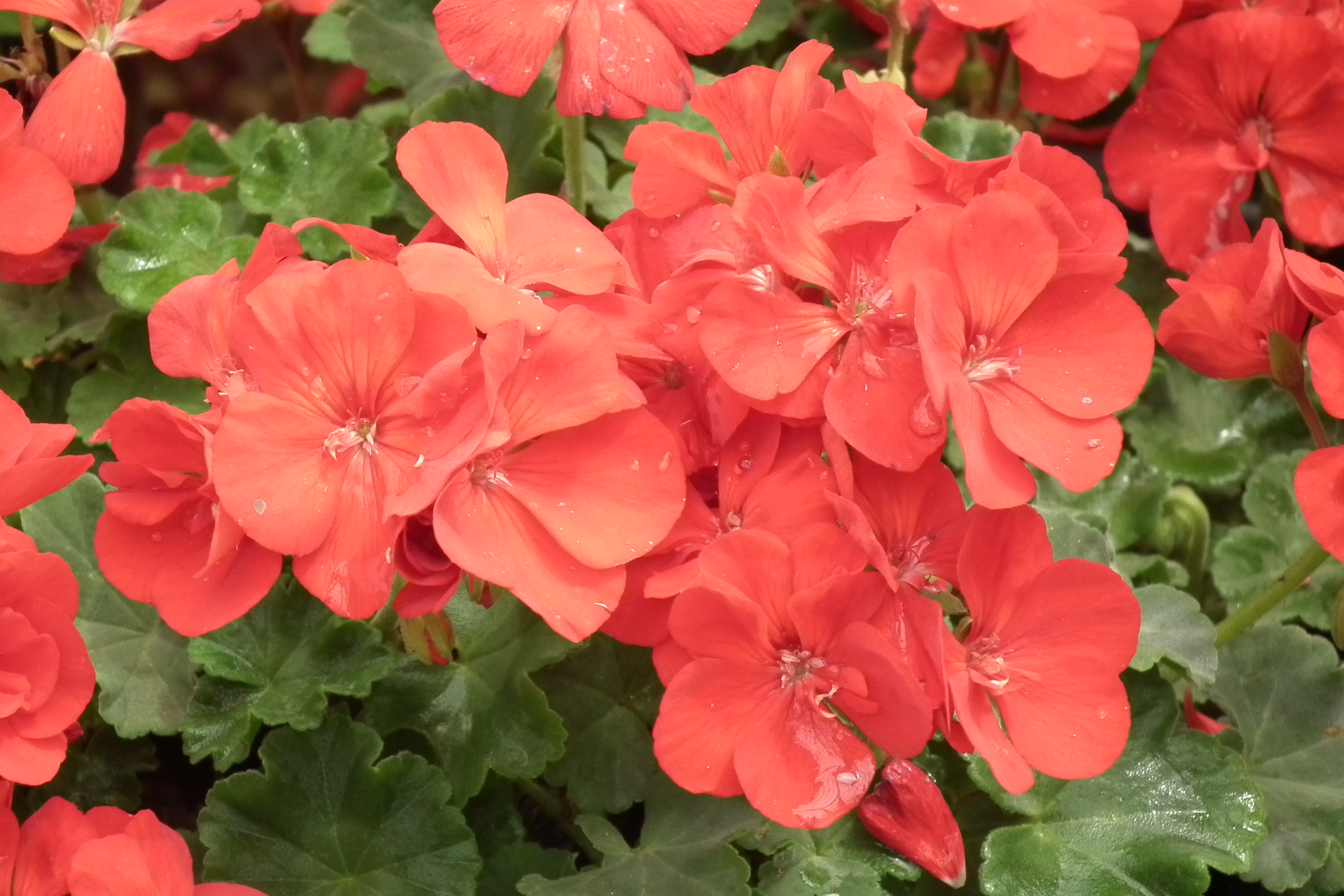
Garden geraniums scarlet flowers

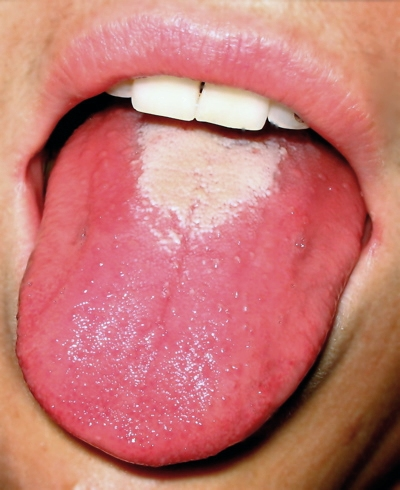
Scarlet fever is an infectious illness common among children between four and eight. It was once a major cause of death, but now can be treated with antibiotics. One symptom is a scarlet-colored tongue.

== Scarlet in culture ==
=== Academic dress ===
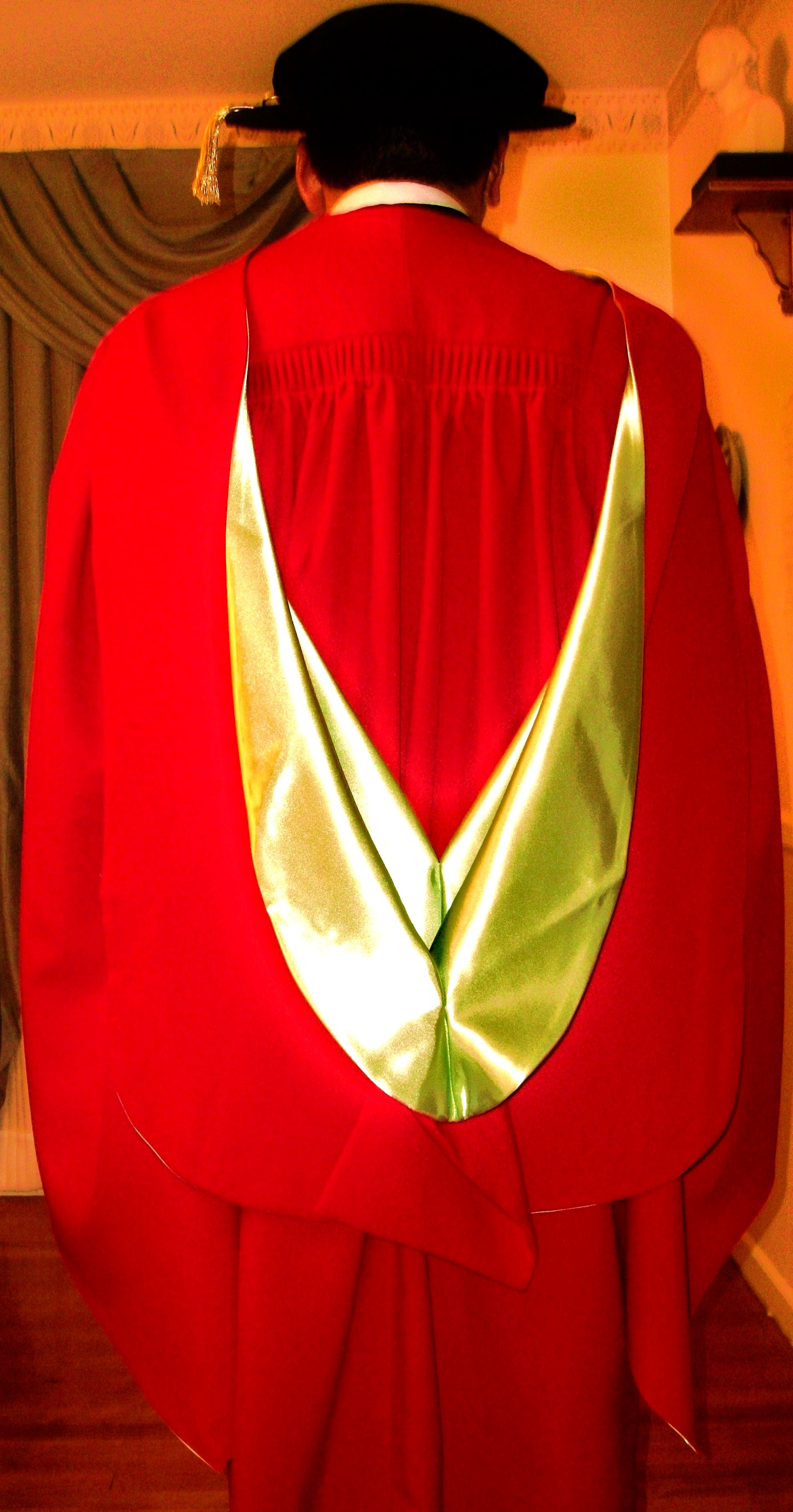
Traditional academic dress of a PhD candidate receiving his degree at McGill University

Scarlet is the color worn in traditional academic dress in the United Kingdom for those awarded doctorates. It is also the color of many of the undergraduate gowns worn by students of the ancient universities of Scotland.

In academic dress in the United States, scarlet is used for hood bindings (borders) and, depending on the university or school, other parts of the dress (velvet chevrons, facings, etc.) to denote a degree in some form or branch of Theology (e.g., Sacred Theology, Canon Law, Divinity, Ministry).

In the French academic dress system, the five traditional fields of study (Arts, Science, Medicine, Law and Divinity) are each symbolized by a distinctive color, which appears in the academic dress of the people who graduated in this field. Scarlet is the distinctive color for Law. As such, it is also the color worn on their court dress by French high magistrates.

=== Film and television ===
- Captain Scarlet and the Mysterons was a British 1960s science-fiction marionette TV series. The captains are all named after a color, including Scarlet, Magenta, White and Grey.
- The Scarlet Pumpernickel is a 1950 Looney Tunes short starring Daffy Duck, a parody of The Scarlet Pimpernel.
- Wanda Maximoff aka Scarlet Witch is the protagonist of WandaVision, the 2021 Marvel Television miniseries.

=== Literature ===
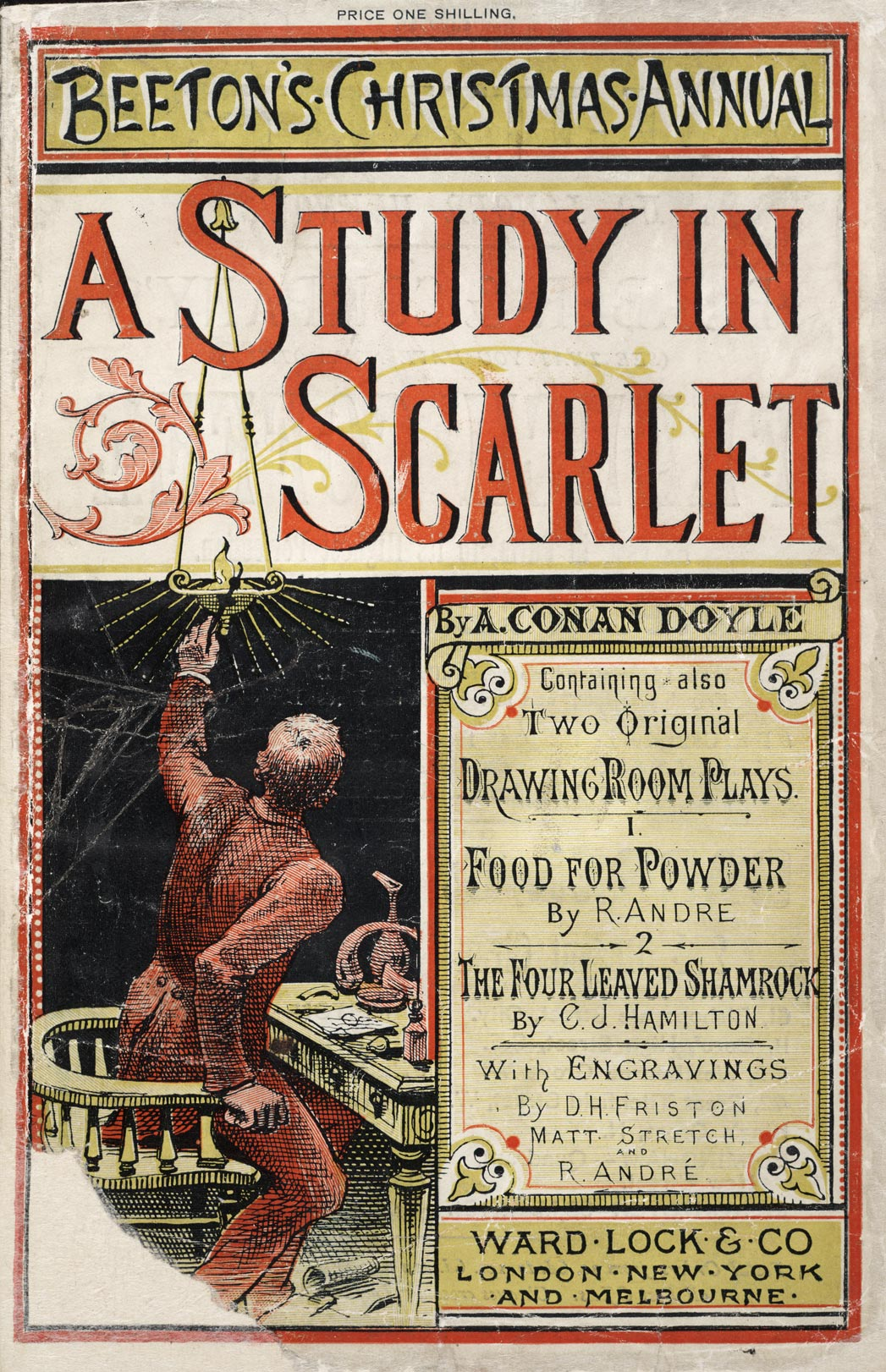
A Study in Scarlet by Arthur Conan Doyle (1887)

- The novel The Scarlet Letter by 19th-century American writer Nathaniel Hawthorne depicts the life of the fictional character Hester Prynne, who wears a prominent scarlet letter "A" (for "adulteress") on her chest as a punishment for adultery.
- A Study in Scarlet was an 1888 detective-mystery novel by Sir Arthur Conan Doyle, introducing and featuring Sherlock Holmes, solving a baffling mystery whose main clue was a message painted on a wall in blood.
- The Scarlet Pimpernel was a popular play and novel about intrigue and adventure during the French Revolution, written by Baroness Emmuska Orczy. The play was first staged in London in 1903, about an English lord, Sir Percy Blakely (Blakeney), who wore a disguise and rescued French nobles from the guillotine during the French Revolution. He was supported by a secret club, the League of the Scarlet Pimpernel, and left the red flower of that name as his calling card. The Baroness later converted her play into a highly successful novel, upon which several movies were based. The hero, who lived a double life as a foppish British aristocrat by day and a disguised fighter for justice by night, inspired later heroes such as Batman and Superman.
- The novel The Scarlet Plague by Jack London tells of a terrible epidemic, which had decimated mankind in the future world of 2073.
- In the novel Scarlet Sails by Russian writer Alexander Grin the protagonist, an imaginative young girl Assol, dreams of a beautiful ship with scarlet sails to come and take her away from the dismal fishing village. Partly due to the association with this novel, scarlet had become viewed as the color of hope and passion in Russian and related cultures.

=== Military ===
- In the modern British army, scarlet is still worn by the Foot Guards, the Life Guards, and by some regimental bands or drummers for ceremonial purposes. Officers and NCOs of those regiments which previously wore red retain scarlet as the color of their "mess" or formal evening jackets. The Royal Gibraltar Regiment has a scarlet tunic in its winter dress.
- Scarlet is worn for some full dress, military band or mess uniforms in the modern armies of a number of the countries that made up the former British Empire. These include the Australian, Jamaican, New Zealand, Fijian, Canadian, Kenyan, Ghanaian, Indian, Singaporean, Sri Lankan and Pakistani armies.
- The musicians of the United States Marine Corps Band wear red, following an 18th-century military tradition that the uniforms of band members are the reverse of the uniforms of the other soldiers in their unit. Since the US Marine uniform is blue with red facings, the band wears the reverse.
- The Brazilian Marine Corps wears a red dress uniform.
- Red Serge is the uniform of the Royal Canadian Mounted Police, created in 1873 as the North-West Mounted Police, and given its present name in 1920. The uniform was adapted from the tunic of the British Army. Cadets at the Royal Military College of Canada also wear red dress uniforms.
- Scarlet is the branch color of the United States Army Field Artillery Corps.
- Scarlet and gold are the colors of the United States Marine Corps.
- Scarlet is the color of the beret given to United States Air Force Combat Controllers, after completion of Combat Control School at Pope Air Force Base.
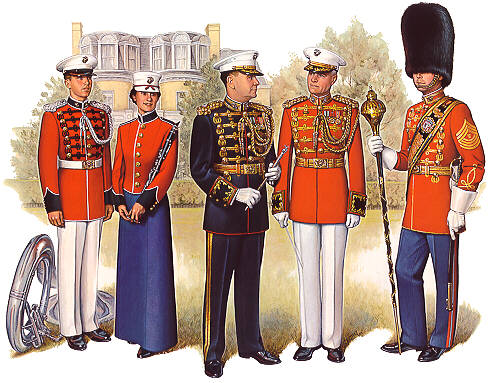
Musicians of the United States Marine Corps Band

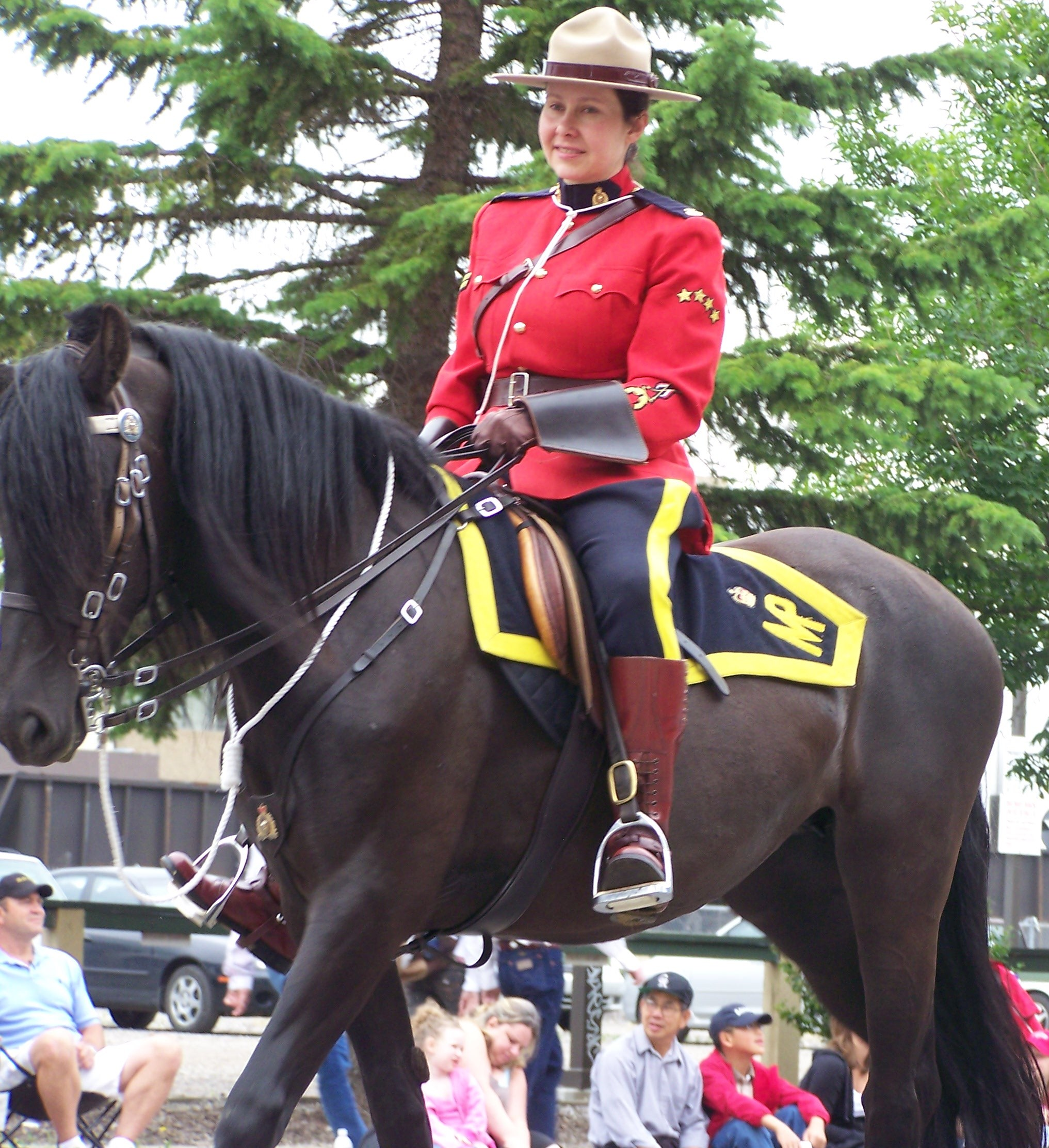
Officer of the Royal Canadian Mounted Police

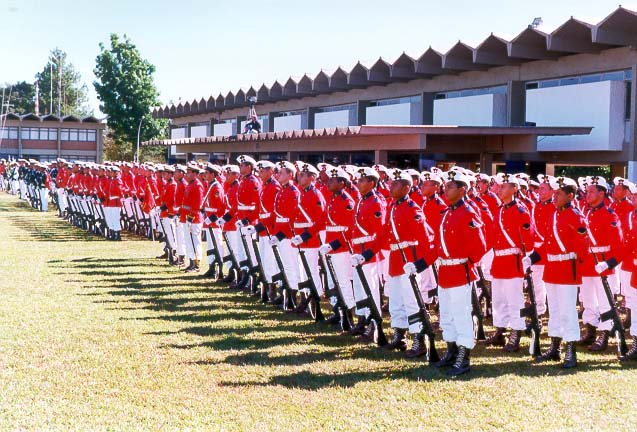
The Brazilian Marine Corps wears a dress uniform called A Garança.

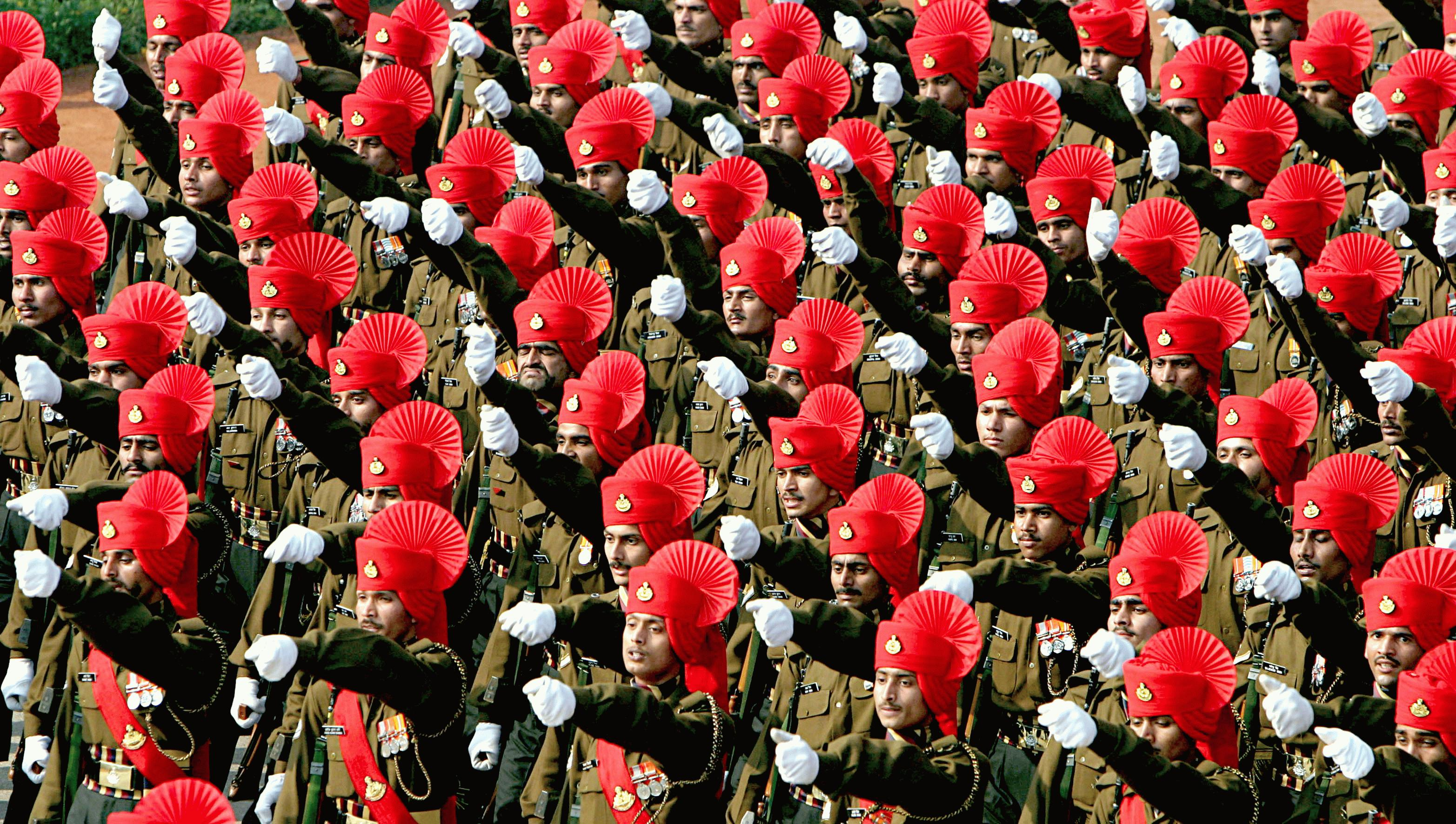
Soldiers of the Rajput Regiment of the Indian Army

=== Orders and decorations ===
- Scarlet is the color of the robes and sash of the Order of the Bath in the United Kingdom, and the Order has a Gentleman Usher of the Scarlet Rod.

=== Religion ===
In the Roman Catholic Church, scarlet robes—symbolizing the color of the blood of Christ and the Christian martyrs—are worn by cardinals as a symbol of their willingness to defend their faith with their own blood. Scarlet red, with or without the use of gold stripes, is the proper color in the Catholic church's liturgy for Palm Sunday, for Good Friday, for Pentecost, for memorials and feasts of saints who were martyred, and for funerals of the Pope or for cardinals. In the Lutheran tradition, scarlet is the color for paraments for Palm or Passion Sunday, and for all of Holy Week through Maundy Thursday.

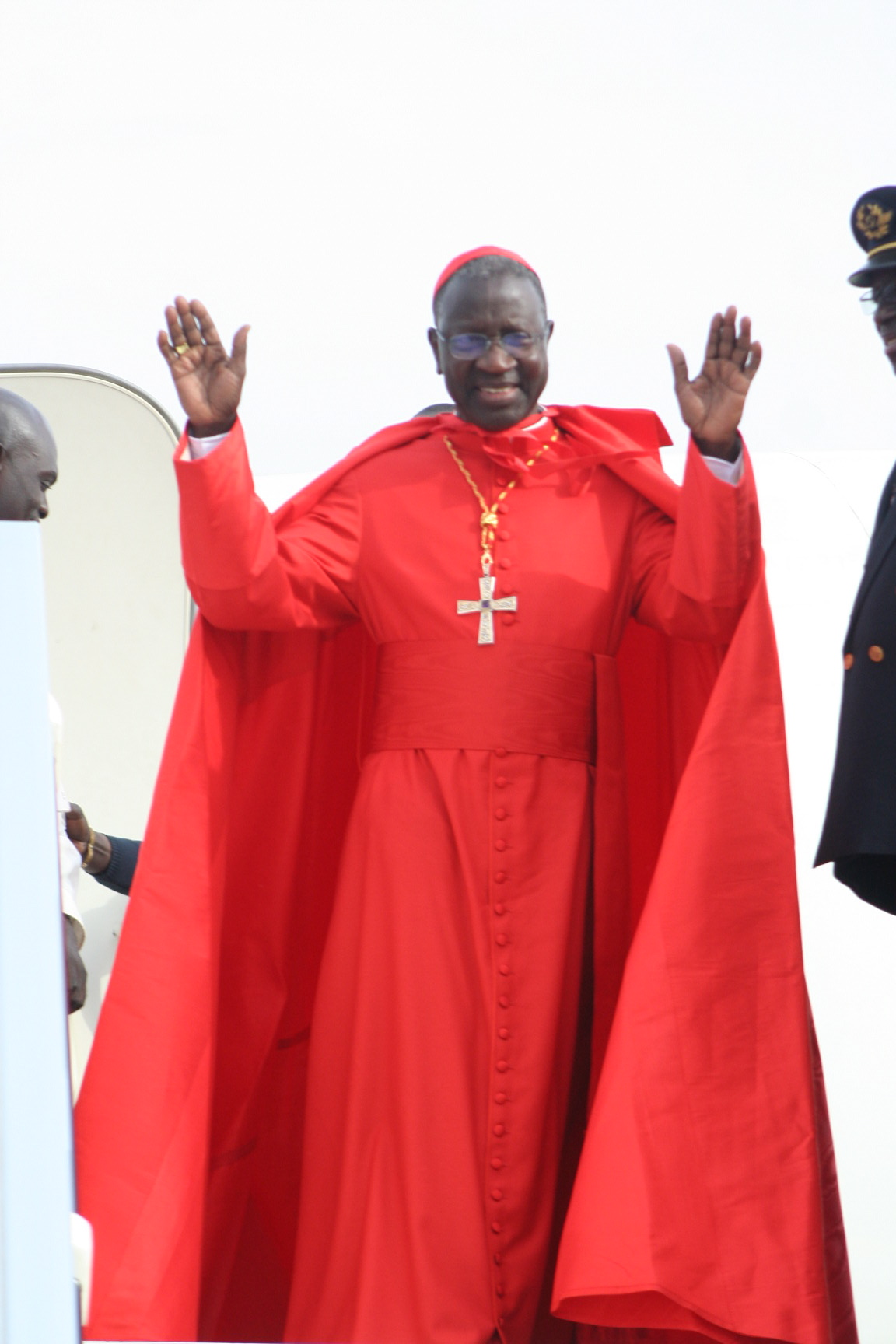
Cardinal Théodore Adrien Sarr, Archbishop of Dakar, Senegal

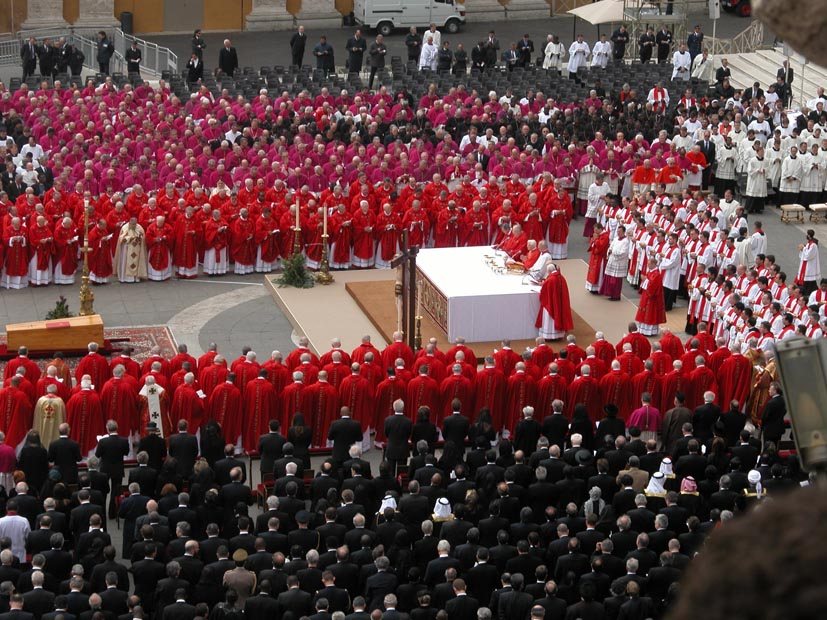
Roman Catholic cardinals together at the funeral of Pope John Paul II. The cardinals in scarlet stand ahead of the bishops in purple.

=== Prostitution ===
In countries that have traditionally been dominated by Christian ideas, scarlet is associated with prostitution. The Book of Revelation refers to the Whore of Babylon riding upon a "scarlet beast" and dressed in purple and scarlet. The phrase Great Scarlet Whore has been used by Puritans in the 17th century, and the phrase The Scarlet Woman was used by many Protestants and later Mormons in North America well into the 20th century. Scarlet and crimson are also linked to the Judeo-Christian concept of sin in the Book of Isaiah, rendered in the King James Version "though your sins be as scarlet, they shall be as white as snow; though they be red like crimson, they shall be as wool."

The connection of red or scarlet with prostitution was very common in Europe and America. Prostitutes were obliged to wear red in some European cities, and even today areas in European cities where prostitutes can work legally are known as red-light districts. Sex worker advocacy groups like the Scarlet Alliance use the striking color to associate themselves with prostitution.

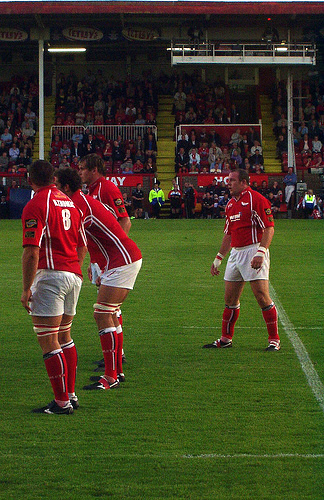
The Scarlets, a professional rugby team in Wales

=== Sports ===
- The Scarlets are the name of a Welsh professional rugby union team, and play in scarlet.
- Scarlet is the sole official color of Rutgers University as an institution. The NCAA Division I athletic teams for its main campus, Rutgers University–New Brunswick, are called the Scarlet Knights, while the NCAA Division III teams for its satellite campuses at Newark and Camden are called the Scarlet Raiders and Scarlet Raptors, respectively.
- The Atlanta Braves has scarlet red as one of the team colors.
- The official colors of the University of Nebraska–Lincoln athletic teams are scarlet and cream.
- The official colors of Ohio State University athletic teams are scarlet and gray.
- The official colors Illinois Institute of Technology athletic teams are scarlet and gray.
- The official colors of Texas Tech University athletic teams are scarlet and black as noted in the fight song.
- The official colors of the Boston University athletic teams are scarlet and white.
- The official color of the Scuderia Ferrari is scarlet red.
- The official color of Toluca FC is scarlet red, from which the club derives its nickname Los Escarlatas (The Scarlets)

== Variations of scarlet ==
=== Websafe scarlet ===
Scarlet (Websafe)

Color coordinates
- Hex triplet: #FF3300
- sRGB^{B} (r, g, b): (255, 51, 0)
- HSV (h, s, v): (12°, 100%, 100%)
- CIELCh_{uv} (L, C, h): (56, 166, 15°)
- ISCC–NBS descriptor: Vivid reddish orange
- B: Normalized to [0–255] (byte)

This is a variation on the standard RGB or Hex combination that produces a truer Scarlet color on some monitors. It is slightly more orange than the standard Scarlet RGB value of 255, 36, 0, but does give a truer color on displays where the red dominates over the orange and would otherwise make the color appear more as a normal red rather than a genuine Scarlet.

=== Torch red ===
Scarlet (Crayola)

Color coordinates
- Hex triplet: #FC2847
- sRGB^{B} (r, g, b): (252, 40, 71)
- HSV (h, s, v): (351°, 84%, 99%)
- CIELCh_{uv} (L, C, h): (55, 155, 9°)
- Source: Crayola
- ISCC–NBS descriptor: Vivid red
- B: Normalized to [0–255] (byte)

This is the color now called scarlet in Crayola crayons. It was originally formulated as torch red in 1998 and then renamed scarlet by Crayola in 2000.

=== Flame ===
Flame

Color coordinates
- Hex triplet: #E25822
- sRGB^{B} (r, g, b): (226, 88, 34)
- HSV (h, s, v): (17°, 85%, 89%)
- CIELCh_{uv} (L, C, h): (55, 121, 21°)
- Source: ISCC-NBS
- ISCC–NBS descriptor: Vivid reddish orange
- B: Normalized to [0–255] (byte)

The first recorded use of flame as a color name in English was in 1590.

The source of this color is the ISCC-NBS Dictionary of Color Names (1955), a color dictionary used by stamp collectors to identify the colors of stamps. A sample of the color "Flame" (color sample #34) is also displayed in the Dictionary online version.

=== Fire brick ===
Fire brick

Color coordinates
- Hex triplet: #B22222
- sRGB^{B} (r, g, b): (178, 34, 34)
- HSV (h, s, v): (0°, 81%, 70%)
- CIELCh_{uv} (L, C, h): (39, 110, 12°)
- Source: X11
- ISCC–NBS descriptor: Vivid red
- B: Normalized to [0–255] (byte)

Displayed below is the web color fire brick, a medium dark shade of scarlet/red.

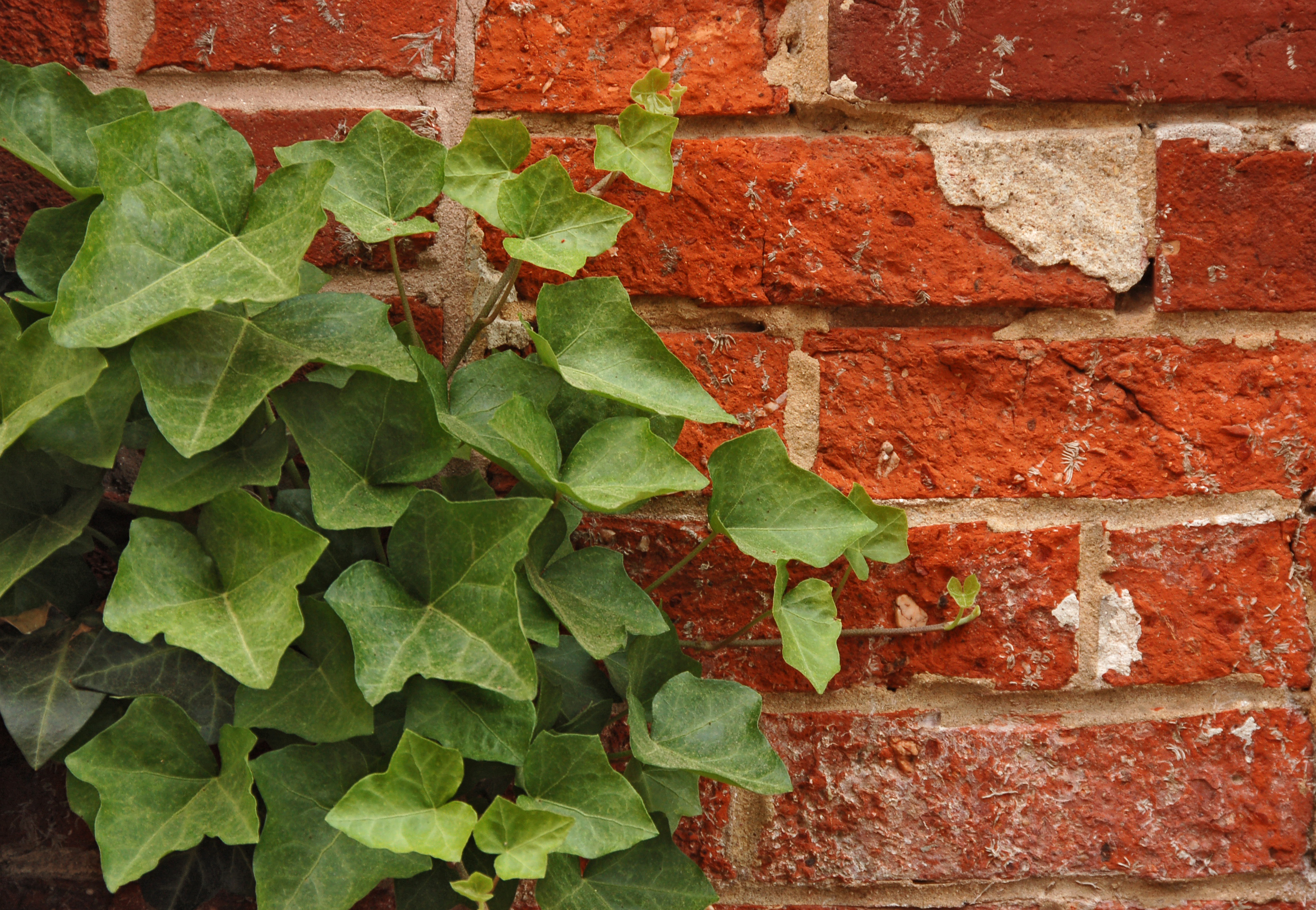
A brick wall

=== Boston University Scarlet ===
Boston University Scarlet

Color coordinates
- Hex triplet: #CC0000
- sRGB^{B} (r, g, b): (204, 0, 0)
- HSV (h, s, v): (0°, 100%, 80%)
- CIELCh_{uv} (L, C, h): (43, 143, 12°)
- Source: Boston University Brand Identity Standards
- ISCC–NBS descriptor: Vivid red
- B: Normalized to [0–255] (byte)

Displayed adjacent is the color Boston University Scarlet, the color which, along with white, is symbolic of Boston University. The color is identical to Utah Crimson.

== Gallery ==
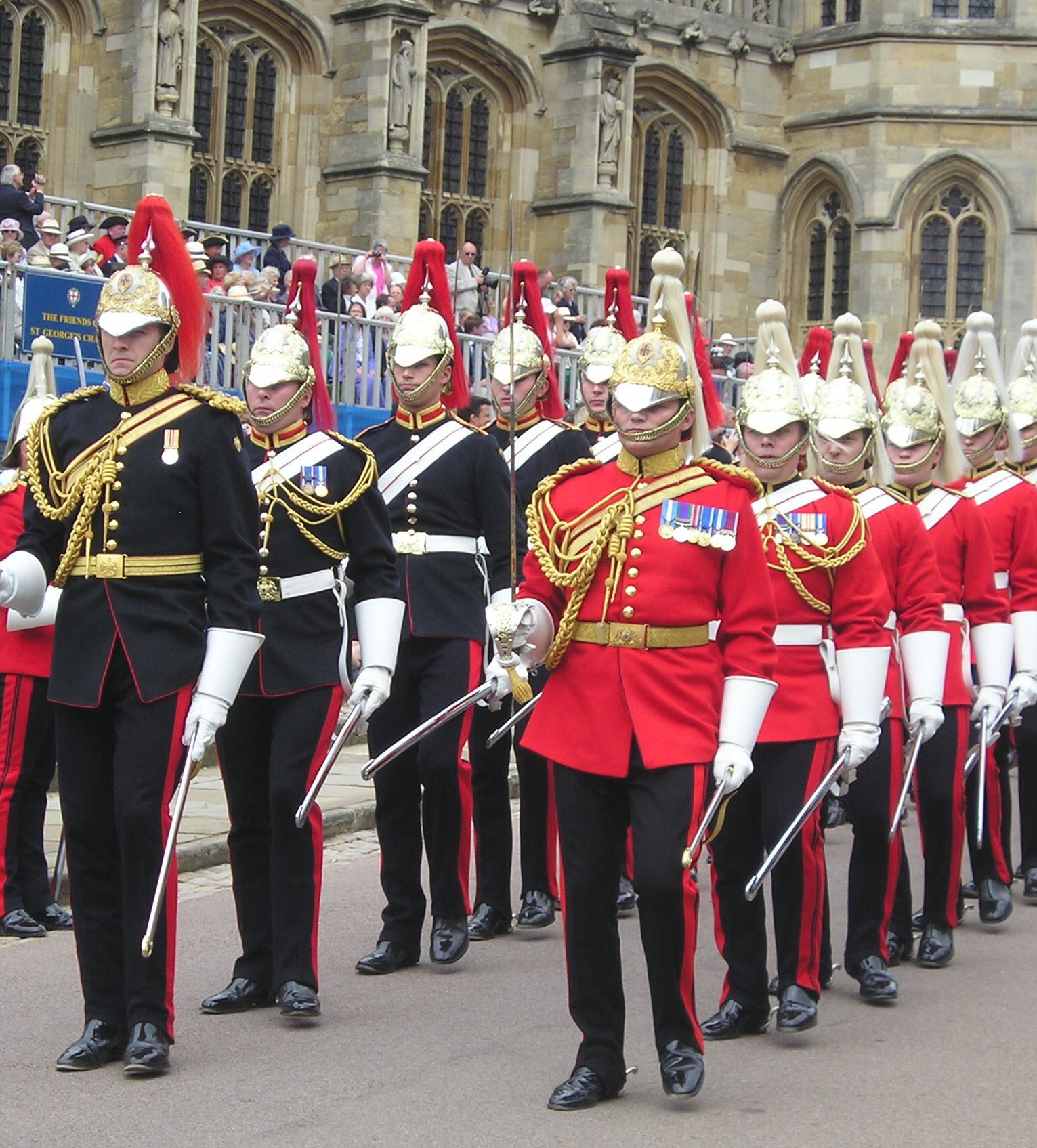
The traditional scarlet uniforms of the Household Cavalry, London

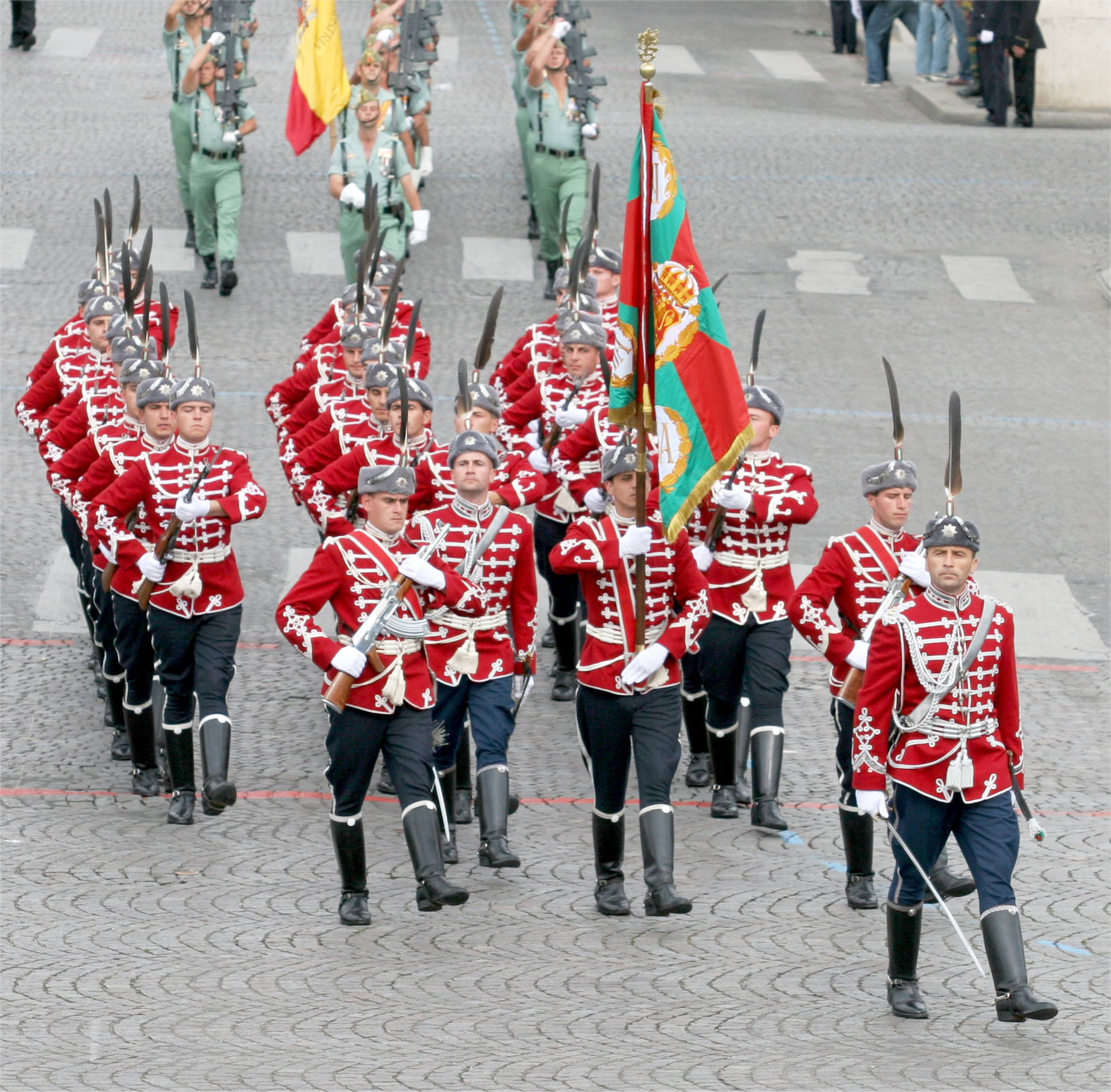
The scarlet uniform of the National Guards Unit of Bulgaria in Paris, France

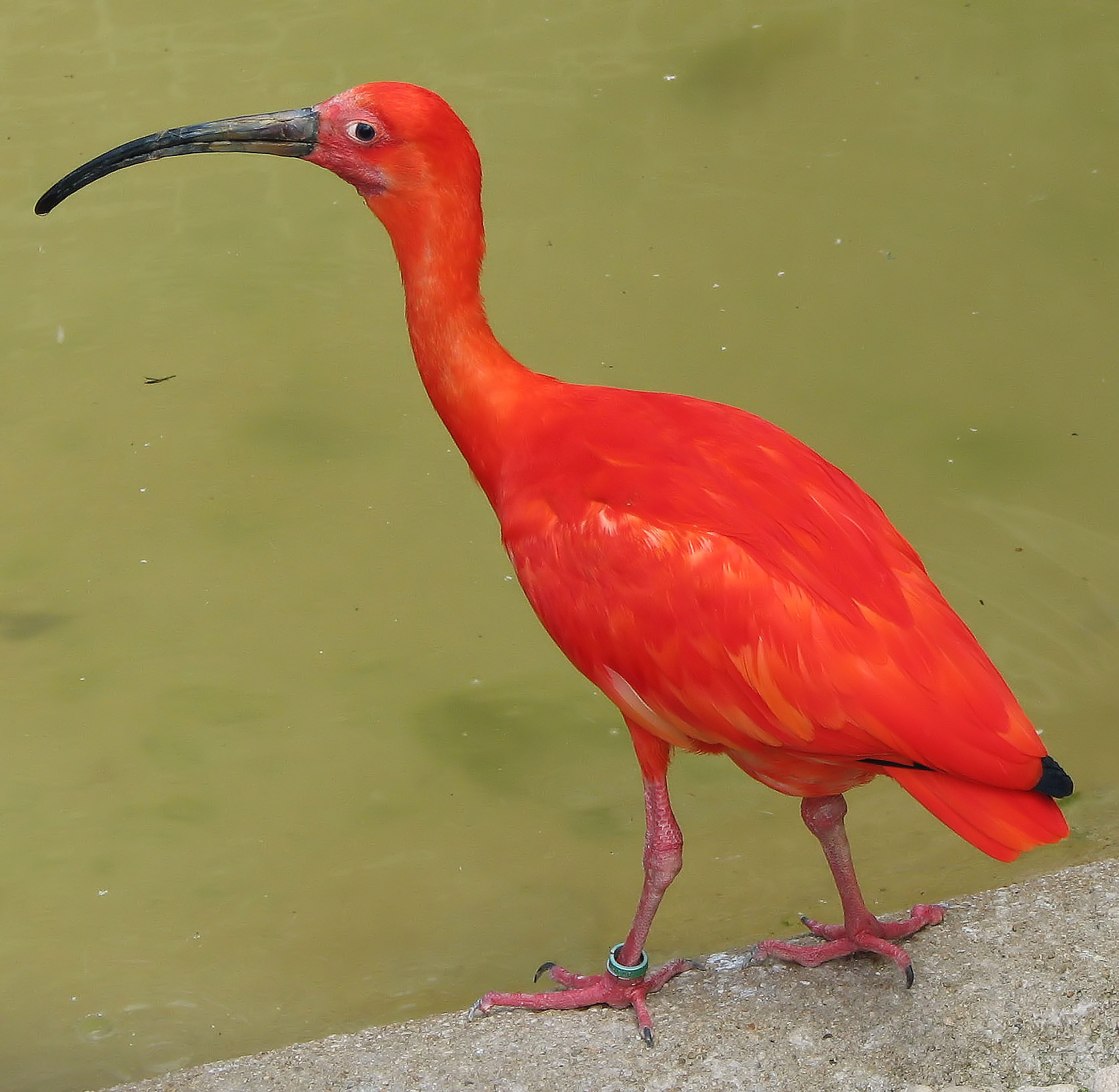
A scarlet ibis in Cotswolds Wildlife Park, Oxfordshire, England

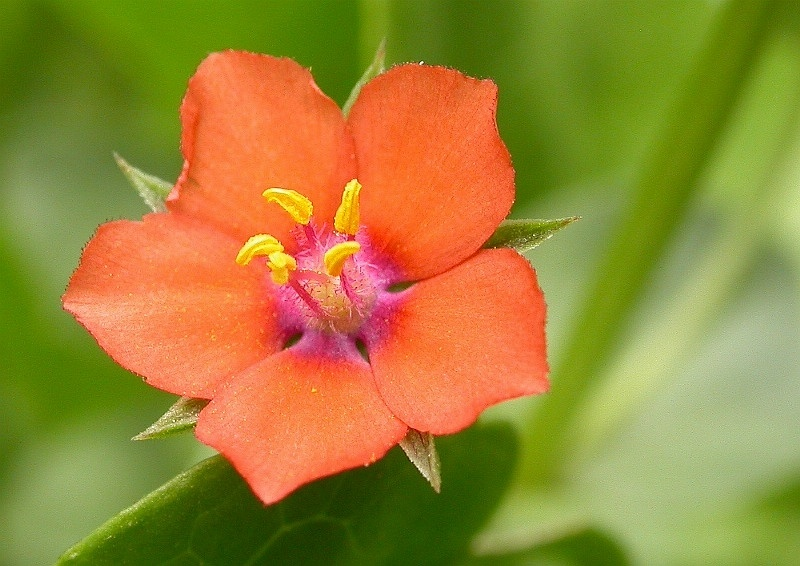
Anagallis arvensis, the scarlet pimpernel flower, gave its name to a popular 1905 adventure novel and series of films.

== See also ==
- Crimson
- Kermes (dye)
- List of colors
- Red pigments
- Vermilion
