= 1913 in science fiction =

The year 1913 was marked, in science fiction, by the following events.

== Births ==
- July 11 : Cordwainer Smith, American writer (died 1966)
- December 18 : Alfred Bester, American writer (died 1987)

== Awards ==
The main science-fiction Awards known at the present time did not exist at this time.

== Literary releases ==
=== Novels ===
- Lesabéndio, novel by Paul Scheerbart
- Der Tunnel, novel by Bernhard Kellermann
- The Poison Belt, novel by Arthur Conan Doyle

== See also ==
- 1913 in science
- 1912 in science fiction
- 1914 in science fiction
