= 1919 in science fiction =

The year 1919 was marked, in science fiction, by the following events.

== Births and deaths ==
=== Births ===
- October 3 : John Boyd, American writer (died 2013)
- October 15 : Edwin Charles Tubb, British writer (died 2010)
- November 26 : Frederik Pohl, American writer (died 2013)

== Events ==
- Creation of the French review Sciences et Voyages.

== Awards ==
The main science-fiction Awards known at the present time did not exist at this time.

== Literary releases ==
=== Novels ===
- First publication of (in French) Out of the Silence, by Erle Cox.

== Audiovisual outputs ==
=== Movies ===
The Harry Houdini serial The Master Mystery featured the first robot in film, called the Automaton.

== See also ==
- 1919 in science
- 1918 in science fiction
- 1920 in science fiction
