= 1914 in science fiction =

The year 1914 was marked, in science fiction, by the following events.

== Births and deaths ==
=== Births ===
- November 7 : Raphael Aloysius Lafferty, American writer (died 2002)

== Awards ==
The main science-fiction Awards known at the present time did not exist at this time.

== Literary releases ==
=== Novels ===
- (in French) Paris in Fire, novel by Henri Barbot.

== See also ==
- 1914 in science
- 1913 in science fiction
- 1915 in science fiction
