= 1915 in science fiction =

The year 1915 was marked, in science fiction, by the following events.

== Births and deaths ==
=== Births ===
- April 7 : Henry Kuttner, American writer (died 1958)
- June 24 : Fred Hoyle, American writer and astronomer (died 2001)
- August 24 : James Tiptree, Jr., American writer (died 1987)
- November 6 : David I. Masson, Scottish writer (died 2007)
- November 15 : Raymond F. Jones, American writer (died 1994)
- December 7 : Leigh Brackett, American writer (died 1978)
- December 29 : Charles L. Harness, American writer (died 2005)

=== Deaths ===
- October 15 : Paul Scheerbart, German writer (born 1863)

== Awards ==
The main science-fiction Awards known at the present time did not exist at this time.

== See also ==
- 1915 in science
- 1914 in science fiction
- 1916 in science fiction
