= 1916 in science fiction =

The year 1916 was marked, in science fiction, by the following events.

== Births and deaths ==
=== Births ===
- August 28 : Jack Vance, American writer (died 2013)

== Awards ==
The main science-fiction Awards known at the present time did not exist at this time.

== Audiovisual outputs ==
=== Movies ===
- The End of the World, by August Blom.
- 20,000 Leagues Under the Sea, by Stuart Paton.
- Homunculus, series of six German movies, by Otto Rippert.

== See also ==
- 1916 in science
- 1915 in science fiction
- 1917 in science fiction
