= 1918 in science fiction =

The year 1918 was marked, in science fiction, by the following events.

== Births and deaths ==
=== Births ===
- January 26 : Philip José Farmer, American writer (died 2009)
- February 26 : Theodore Sturgeon, American writer (died 1985)
- November 29 : Madeleine L'Engle, American writer, (died 2007)

== Awards ==
The main science-fiction Awards known at the present time did not exist at this time.

== Audiovisual outputs ==
=== Movies ===
- Alraune, die Henkerstochter, genannt die rote Hanne, by Jenő Illés and Josef Klein.

== See also ==
- 1918 in science
- 1917 in science fiction
- 1919 in science fiction
