= 1912 in science fiction =

The year 1912 was marked, in science fiction, by the following events.

== Births and deaths ==
=== Births ===
- February 17 : Andre Norton, American writer (died 2005)
- February 20 : Pierre Boulle, French writer (died 1994)
- April 8 : John Carnell, British editor (died 1972)
- April 26 : A. E. van Vogt, Canadian writer (died 2000)

== Awards ==
The main science-fiction Awards known at the present time did not exist at this time.

== Literary releases ==
=== Novels ===
- Das Menschenschlachthaus. Bilder vom kommenden Krieg, novel by Wilhelm Lamszus.
- The Scarlet Plague, novel by Jack London.
- The Lost World, novel by Arthur Conan Doyle.

== See also ==
- 1912 in science
- 1911 in science fiction
- 1913 in science fiction
