= 1917 in science fiction =

The year 1917 was marked, in science fiction, by the following events.

== Births and deaths ==
=== Births ===
- February 25 : Anthony Burgess, British writer (died 1993)
- March 17 : Charles Fontenay, American writer and journalist (died 2007)
- April 5 : Robert Bloch, American writer (died 1994)
- August 28 : Jack Kirby, American scenarist and illustrator (died 1994)
- November 1 : Zenna Henderson, American writer (died 1983)
- December 16 : Arthur C. Clarke, British writer (died 2008)

== Awards ==
The main science-fiction Awards known at the present time did not exist at this time.

== Literary releases ==
=== Novels ===
- A Princess of Mars, by Edgar Rice Burroughs.

== See also ==
- 1917 in science
- 1916 in science fiction
- 1918 in science fiction
