= The Scarlet Plague =

1912 novel by Jack London

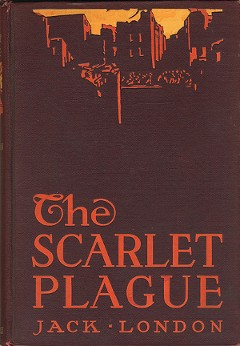
- Cover of the first book edition
- Author: Jack London
- Language: English
- Publisher: Macmillan
- Publication date: 1912
- Publication place: United States
- Media type: Print

The Scarlet Plague is a post-apocalyptic fiction novel by American writer Jack London, originally published in The London Magazine in 1912.

== Plot summary ==
The story takes place in 2073, sixty years after an uncontrollable epidemic, the Red Death, has depopulated the planet. James Smith is one of the survivors of the era before the scarlet plague hit and is still left alive in the San Francisco area, and he travels with his grandsons Edwin, Hoo-Hoo, and Hare-Lip. His grandsons are young and live as primeval hunter-gatherers in a heavily depopulated world. Their intellect is limited, as are their language abilities. Edwin asks Smith, whom they call "Granser", to tell them of the disease alternately referred to as scarlet plague, scarlet death, or red death.

Smith recounts the story of his life before the plague, when he was an English professor. The then future year of 2013 is described as a plutocratic society reminiscent of London's other books such as the Iron Heel with Smith recalling "Morgan the Fifth was appointed President of the United States by the Board of Magnates". The Scarlet Plague came about and spread rapidly across the globe. Sufferers would turn scarlet, particularly on the face, and become numb in their lower extremities. Victims usually died within 30 minutes of first seeing symptoms. Despite their efforts doctors and scientists can find no cure, and those who attempted to do so were also killed by the disease. The grandsons question Smith's belief in "germs" causing the illness because they cannot be seen.

Smith witnesses his first victim of the scarlet plague while teaching when a young woman's face turns scarlet. She dies quickly, and a panic soon overtakes the campus. He returns home, but his family refuses to join him because they fear he is infected. Soon, an epidemic overtakes the area and residents begin rioting and killing one another. Smith meets with colleagues at his college's chemistry building, where they hope to wait out the problem. They soon realize they must move elsewhere for safety and begin trekking northward.

Shortly, Smith's entire party dies out and he is left as the sole survivor. He lives for three years on his own with the company of a pony and two dogs. Eventually, his need for social interaction compels him back to the San Francisco area in search of other people. He finally discovers a sort of new society has been created with a few survivors, who have broken into tribes.

Smith worries that he is the last to remember the times before the plague. He reminisces about the quality of food, social classes, his job, and technology. As he realizes his time grows short, he tries to impart the value of knowledge and wisdom to his grandsons. His efforts are in vain, however, as the children ridicule his recollections of the past, which sound totally unbelievable to them.

== Publication history ==
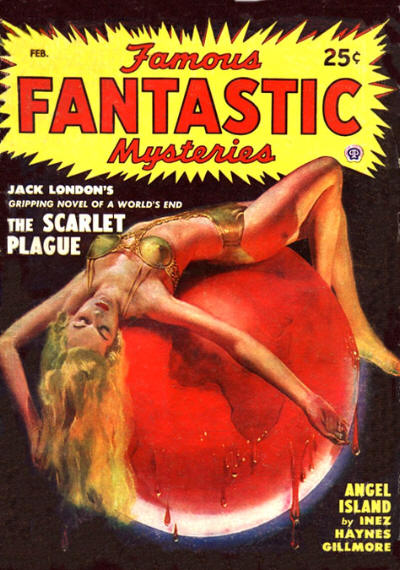
The Scarlet Plague was reprinted in the February 1949 issue of Famous Fantastic Mysteries.

The Scarlet Plague was written in 1910 but not serialized until the May–June 1912 issue of London Magazine. It was published as a book in 1915 by Macmillan.

The Scarlet Plague was later reprinted in the February 1949 issue of Famous Fantastic Mysteries. Readers were impressed that London seemed to have anticipated the anxieties of the Atomic Age.

Jack London was inspired in part by Edgar Allan Poe's 1842 short story "The Masque of the Red Death", though the virus itself has different symptoms. Both Poe's story and London's fall into a genre of apocalyptic fiction featuring a universal plague that nearly wipes out humanity. Other examples include Mary Shelley's The Last Man (1826), René Barjavel's Ravage (1943), George R. Stewart's Earth Abides (1949), Michael Crichton's The Andromeda Strain (1969), and Stephen King's The Stand (1978).

== Criticism ==
London published The Scarlet Plague in book form at a point in his career that biographers and critics have called a "professional decline", from September 1912 to May 1916. In this period, he stopped writing short works and shifted to longer works including The Abysmal Brute (1913), John Barleycorn (1913), The Mutiny of the Elsinore (1914), The Star Rover (1915), among others.

In The World Beyond the Hill: Science Fiction and the Quest for Transcendence, the authors quote the last old man who remembers the world as it was, as he ponders the wisdom of saving or destroying the last remaining books:

It were just as well that I destroyed those cave-stored books—whether they remain or perish, all their old truths will be discovered, their old lies lived and handed down. What is the profit—

The authors write, "London was never able to decide whether civilization was a surpassing wonder worth the price of fire and blood and fifty thousand years of effort, or whether it was a profitless futility."

== See also ==
- 1912 in science fiction
