= 1955 in science fiction =

The year 1955 was marked, in science fiction, by the following events.

== Births and deaths ==
=== Births ===
- Catherine Asaro
- Bruce Bethke
- Pierre Bordage
- Steven Brust
- Sue Burke
- Richard Chwedyk
- Massimo Citi
- Brenda Clough
- Julie E. Czerneda
- Jeffrey Ford
- James Alan Gardner
- Steven Gould
- Simon R. Green
- Karen Haber
- Geoffrey Landis
- Paul J. McAuley
- Pat Murphy
- Richard Parks
- Nisi Shawl
- Jack Skillingstead
- Suzanne Weyn

=== Deaths ===
- Nat Schachner (b. 1895)

== Literary releases ==
=== First editions ===
- Address: Centauri by F. L. Wallace, a group of disabled outcasts escape to Alpha Centauri and encounter butterfly-like aliens.
- Alien Minds by E. Everett Evans, a secret service agent has the ability to read minds.
- The Big Jump by Leigh Brackett, about humanity's first faster-than-light space mission.
- The Chrysalids by John Wyndham, set in a post-apocalyptic world where telepathic children must hide their abilities.
- Earthlight by Arthur C. Clarke, centers on political tensions and a scientific mystery on the Moon.
- The End of Eternity by Isaac Asimov, time manipulators struggle with the ethical implications of altering history.
- Gladiator-At-Law by Frederik Pohl and Cyril M. Kornbluth, critiques corporate control and social inequality in a future society.
- Hell's Pavement by Damon Knight, about dealing with asocial behavior by giving everyone a mental imprint of an authority figure that intervenes whenever violent or otherwise harmful acts are contemplated. (Note: See also bicameral mind.)
- The Long Tomorrow by Leigh Brackett, post-nuclear war society regresses to agrarian life, shunning technology.
- The Magellanic Cloud by Stanisław Lem (in Polish), depicts a space expedition and the challenges of interstellar travel.
- Not This August by C. M. Kornbluth, explores a Cold War scenario where the U.S. is occupied by Soviet forces.
- The Other Side of Here by Murray Leinster, tells the story of an invasion from the fourth dimension, foiled by an insurrection against the invaders' home government. (Note: Originally serialized in Astounding Stories in 1936.)
- Revolt on Alpha C by Robert Silverberg, colonists on a distant planet rebel against an oppressive government.
- Solar Lottery by Philip K. Dick, a dystopian future where leaders are chosen by random lottery and face constant assassination threats.
- Star Bridge by Jack Williamson and James E. Gunn, an adventure story.
- Star Guard by Andre Norton, mercenaries from Earth serve alien civilizations in a galactic federation.
- This Fortress World by James E. Gunn, concerns a man's fight against the power of a future church.
- Timeliner by Charles Eric Maine, a scientist travels forward in time by repeatedly replacing the consciousness of other men.
- Under the Triple Suns by Stanton A. Coblentz, the survivors of the destruction of the earth attempt to settle a new planet.

=== Short stories ===
- "The Star" by Arthur C. Clarke, Infinity Science Fiction (November).

=== Short story collections ===
- The Martian Way and Other Stories by Isaac Asimov.

=== Juveniles ===
- Godzilla and Godzilla Raids Again by Shigeru Kayama, a novelization of the first two films in the Godzilla franchise produced by Toho, Godzilla (1954) and Godzilla Raids Again (1955), both of which were based on story outlines by Kayama.
- The Secret of the Martian Moons by Donald A. Wollheim (juvenile), a Teenager believes to have found Martians
- Tunnel in the Sky by Robert A. Heinlein (juvenile), students must survive on a hostile planet after a survival test goes wrong.

=== Children's books ===
- Mission to Mars by Patrick Moore, a young man joins a rescue mission to Mars, saves a stranded expedition, and encounters intelligent alien creatures.

== Movies ==
Title	Director	Cast	Country	Subgenre/Notes
The Beast with a Million Eyes	David Kramarsky	Paul Birch, Lorna Thayer, Dona Cole, Dick Sargent	United States	Horror (Note: Uncredited. There is no hint of other directors on the reel, on air or on AMC TV. Co-directed by Lou Place and Roger Corman.)
Bride of the Monster	Edward D. Wood Jr.	Bela Lugosi, Tor Johnson, Tony McCoy, Loretta King	United States	Horror
Creature with the Atom Brain	Edward L. Cahn	Richard Denning, Angela Greene, S. John Launer	United States	Crime Horror Thriller
Conquest of Space	Byron Haskin	Walter Brooke, Eric Fleming, Mickey Shaughnessy	United States	
The Phantom from 10,000 Leagues	Dan Milner	Kent Taylor, Cathy Downs, Michael Whalen	United States	Horror
Day the World Ended	Roger Corman	Richard Denning, Lori Nelson, Paul Birch, Touch Connors	United States	Horror
Godzilla Raids Again (a.k.a. Gigantis, the Fire Monster)	Motoyoshi Oda	Hiroshi Koizumi, Minoru Chiaki	Japan	Horror Kaijū (released in U.S. in 1959)
It Came from Beneath the Sea	Robert Gordon	Kenneth Tobey, Faith Domergue, Donald Curtis	United States	Horror
Journey to the Beginning of Time	Karel Zeman	Josef Lukáš, Petr Herrmann, Zdeněk Husták, Vladimír Bejval	Czechoslovakia	Dinosaurs
King Dinosaur	Bert I. Gordon	Josef Lukáš, Petr Herrmann, Zdeněk Husták, Vladimír Bejval	United States	Adventure
Half Human	Ishirō Honda	Akira Takarada, Akemi Negishi	Japan	Horror. Japanese version. See 1958 for USA version
The Quatermass Xperiment	Val Guest	Brian Donlevy, Jack Warner, Richard Wordsworth, Margia Dean	United Kingdom	Horror (Note: U.S. title: The Creeping Unknown.)
Revenge of the Creature	Jack Arnold	John Agar, Lori Nelson, John Bromfield, Nestor Paiva	United States	Horror
Tarantula	Jack Arnold	John Agar, Mara Corday, Leo G. Carroll, Nestor Paiva	United States	Horror
This Island Earth	Jack Arnold, Joseph Newman	Jeff Morrow, Faith Domergue, Rex Reason	United States	Horror Mystery
Timeslip (a.k.a. The Atomic Man (USA))	Ken Hughes	Gene Nelson, Faith Domergue	United Kingdom	

== Awards ==
- They'd Rather Be Right (also known as The Forever Machine) by Mark Clifton and Frank Riley won the Hugo Award for Best Novel.

== See also ==
- 1955 in science
