= 1925 in science fiction =

The year 1925 was marked, in science fiction, by the following events.

== Births ==
- January 22: Katherine MacLean, American writer
- February 14: J. T. McIntosh, Scottish writer (died 2008)
- March 12: Harry Harrison, American writer (died 2012)
- June 9:
  - Bob Ottum, American writer (died 1986)
  - Keith Laumer, American writer (died 1993)
- August 18: Brian Aldiss, British writer (died 2017)
- Arkady Strugatsky, Russian writer (died 1991)

== Awards ==
The main science-fiction Awards known at the present time did not exist at this time.

== Literary releases ==
=== Novels ===
- (in French) Les Hommes frénétiques, by Ernest Pérochon
- (in French) Les Navigateurs de l'infini, by J.-H. Rosny aîné.
- (in French) Out of the Silence, by Erle Cox (publication as book; the novel had been published in a magazine, each week during six months, in 1919).
- (in Russian) Heart of a Dog by Mikhail Bulgakov.
- (in Russian) The Fatal Eggs by Mikhail Bulgakov.
- (in Russian) Professor Dowell's Head by Alexander Belayev.

== Audiovisual outputs ==
=== Movies ===
- The Crazy Ray, by René Clair.
- Luch Smerti, by Lev Kuleshov.

== See also ==
- 1925 in science
- 1924 in science fiction
- 1926 in science fiction
