= 1936 in science fiction =

The year 1936 was marked, in science fiction, by the following events.

== Births and deaths ==
=== Births ===
- April 19 : Tom Purdom, American writer
- June 11 : (in French) Bernard Dufossé, French illustrator (died 2016)
- November 18 : Suzette Haden Elgin : American writer (died 2015)
- November 19 : Wolfgang Jeschke, German writer (died 2015)

== Events ==
- First publication of the British magazine Novae Terrae; the magazine will be named New Worlds in 1939.

== Literary releases ==
=== Serialized novels ===
- The Cometeers by Jack Williamson, Astounding Stories, published in book form in 1950.
- The Incredible Invasion by Murray Leinster, Astounding Stories, published in book form as The Other Side of Here in 1955.

=== Short stories ===
- (in French) Les Mains et la machine (Stenographer's Hands, 1928), translate by Régis Messac.
- (in French) La Nourrice automatique (The Psychophonic Nurse, 1928), translate by Régis Messac.
- (in French) Les Mains et la machine (The Ivy War, 1930), translate by Régis Messac.

== Movies ==
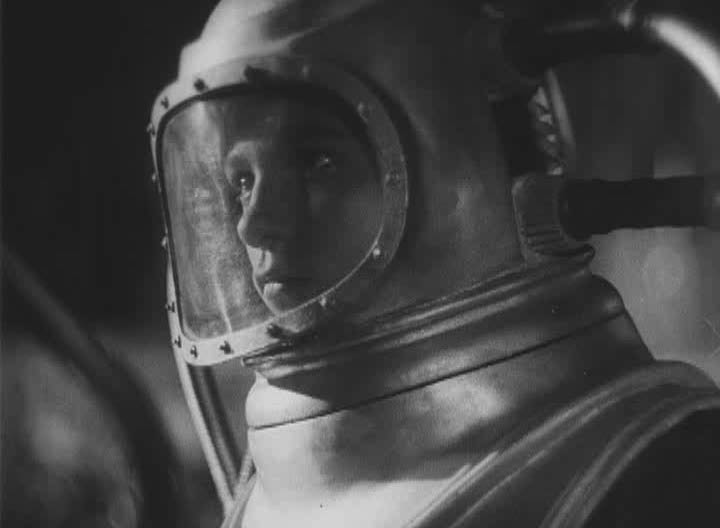
Ksenia Moskalenko as a cosmonaut in Soviet film Cosmic Voyage

- Flash Gordon, by Frederick Stephani and Ray Taylor.
- Things to Come, by William Cameron Menzies.
- Kosmicheskiy reys (Cosmic Voyage), by Vassili Jouravlev.

== Awards ==
The main science-fiction Awards known at the present time did not exist at this time.

== See also ==
- 1936 in science
