= 2012 in science fiction =

The year 2012 is marked, in science fiction, by the following events.

== Events ==
- George Lucas sold Lucasfilm, with all its property, including Star Wars franchise, to Disney for $4 billion.
- Esli magazine closed down.

=== Deaths ===
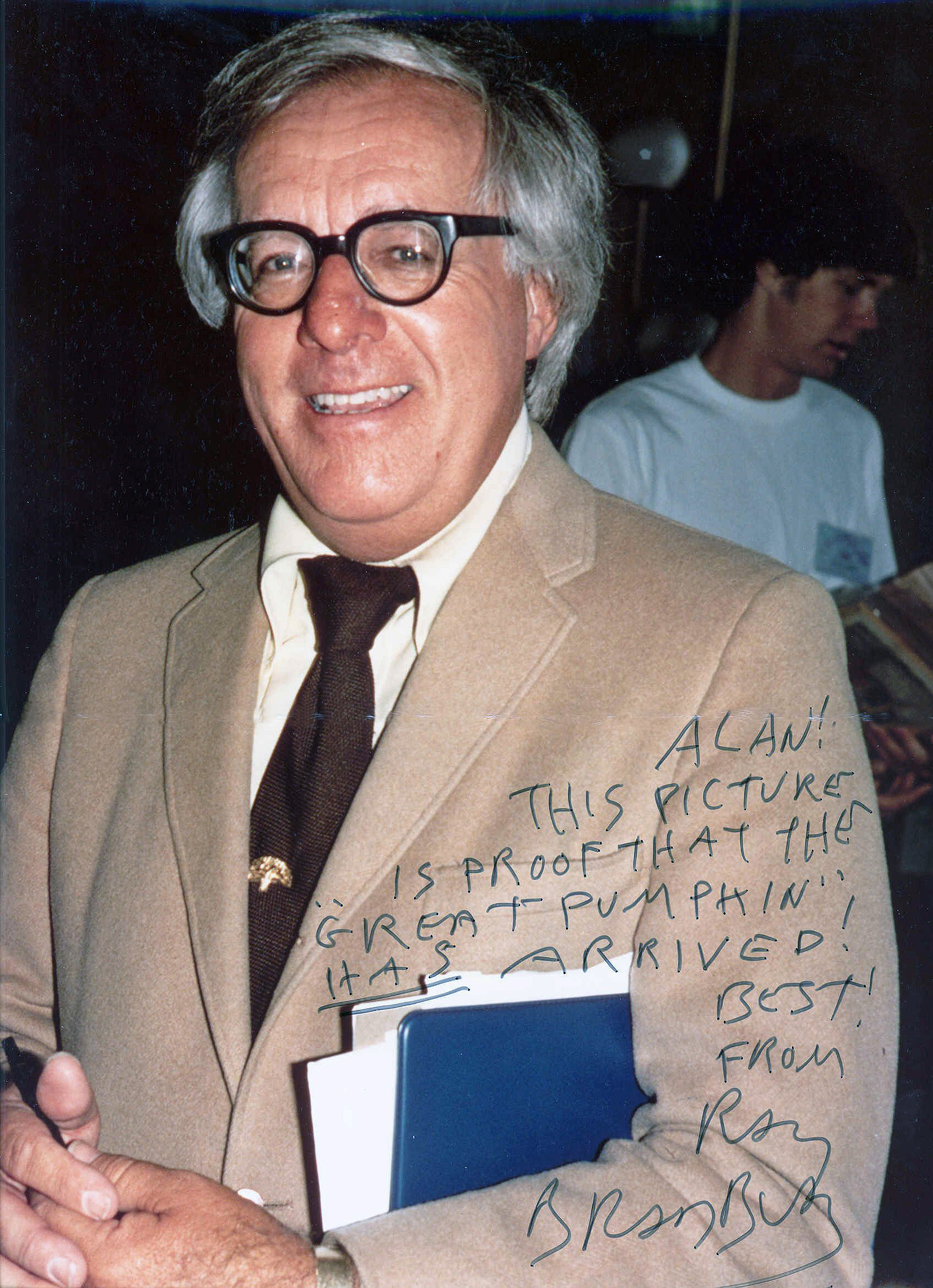
Ray Bradbury, a famous science fiction writer, died in 2012

- February 3 – John Christopher, British writer (born 1922)
- May 8 – Jean Giraud, aka Moebius, French artist and writer (born 1938)
- June 5 – Ray Bradbury, American writer (b. 1920)
- August 15 – Harry Harrison, American writer (b. 1925)
- November 19 – Boris Strugatsky, Russian writer (b. 1933)

== Films ==
- Antiviral
- Battleship
- Chronicle
- Cloud Atlas
- Evangelion: 3.0 You Can (Not) Redo
- Dredd
- The Hunger Games
- Iron Sky
- John Carter
- John Dies at the End
- Lockout
- Looper
- Men in Black 3
- Prometheus
- Resident Evil: Retribution
- Robot & Frank
- Total Recall
- Universal Soldier: Day of Reckoning
- Upside Down
- The Watch

== Literature ==
- Earth Unaware by Orson Scott Card and Aaron Johnson
- Shadows in Flight by Orson Scott Card
- Caliban's War by James S.A. Corey

== Awards ==
=== Saturn Award ===
- Best science fiction film: Rise of the Planet of the Apes
- Best Network Television Series: Fringe

=== Locus Award ===
- Best Science Fiction Novel - Embassytown by China Miéville

Preceded by 2011	Science fiction by year 2012	Succeeded by 2013
