= 1934 in science fiction =

The year 1934 was marked, in science fiction, by the following events.

== Births ==
- January 23 : Michel Jeury, French writer, (died 2015).
- March 5 : Jacques Sadoul, French writer and editor, (died 2013)
- May 31 : Jacques Goimard, French writer and editor, (died 2012).
- August 16 : Andrew J. Offutt, American writer, (died 2013)
- November 9 : Carl Sagan, American astronomer and writer, (died 1996).

== Literary releases ==
=== Novels ===
- Legion of Space Series, by Jack Williamson.
- (in French) Triplanetary, by Edward Elmer Smith.

=== Short stories ===
- Night on the Galactic Railroad, by Kenji Miyazawa.

== Awards ==
The main science-fiction Awards known at the present time did not exist at this time.

== See also ==
- 1934 in science
