= 1926 in science fiction =

The year 1926 was marked, in science fiction, by the following events.

== Births and deaths ==
=== Births ===
- February 20 – Richard Matheson, American writer (died 2013)
- March 19 – Jimmy Guieu, French writer (died 2000)
- March 29 – Lino Aldani, Italian writer (died 2009)
- April 1 – Anne McCaffrey, American writer (died 2011)
- May 9 – John Middleton Murry, Jr., British writer (died 2002)
- August 9 – Frank M. Robinson, American writer (died 2014)
- August 12 - Chan Davis, American writer (died 2022)
- November 25 – Poul Anderson, American writer (died 2001)

== Events ==
- April – first publication of Amazing Stories, which ran until 1995 (and again from 1998–2000, 2004–2005 and 2012–present)

== Awards ==
The main science-fiction Awards known at the present time did not exist at this time.

== Literary releases ==
=== Novels ===
- Metropolis, by Thea von Harbou
- The Land of Mist, by Arthur Conan Doyle
- (in Russian) The Lord of the World, by Alexander Belayev

=== Short stories ===
- (in French) The Coming of the Ice, by Green Peyton Wertenbaker

== See also ==
- 1926 in science
- 1925 in science fiction
- 1927 in science fiction
