= Kumudini =

Kumudini may refer to

- Kumudini boat massacre, on 15 May 1985 in a ferry.
- Kumudini College, located in Tangail, Bangladesh

People

- Kumudini Basu, Bengali writer and social reformer
- Kumudini Lakhia, Indian dancer
- Kumudini Mohapatra, Indian writer
- Kumudini Patnaik, Indian politician
- Kumudini Tyagi, Indian aviator
