= 2015 in science fiction =

The year 2015 was marked, in science fiction, by the following events.

== Events ==
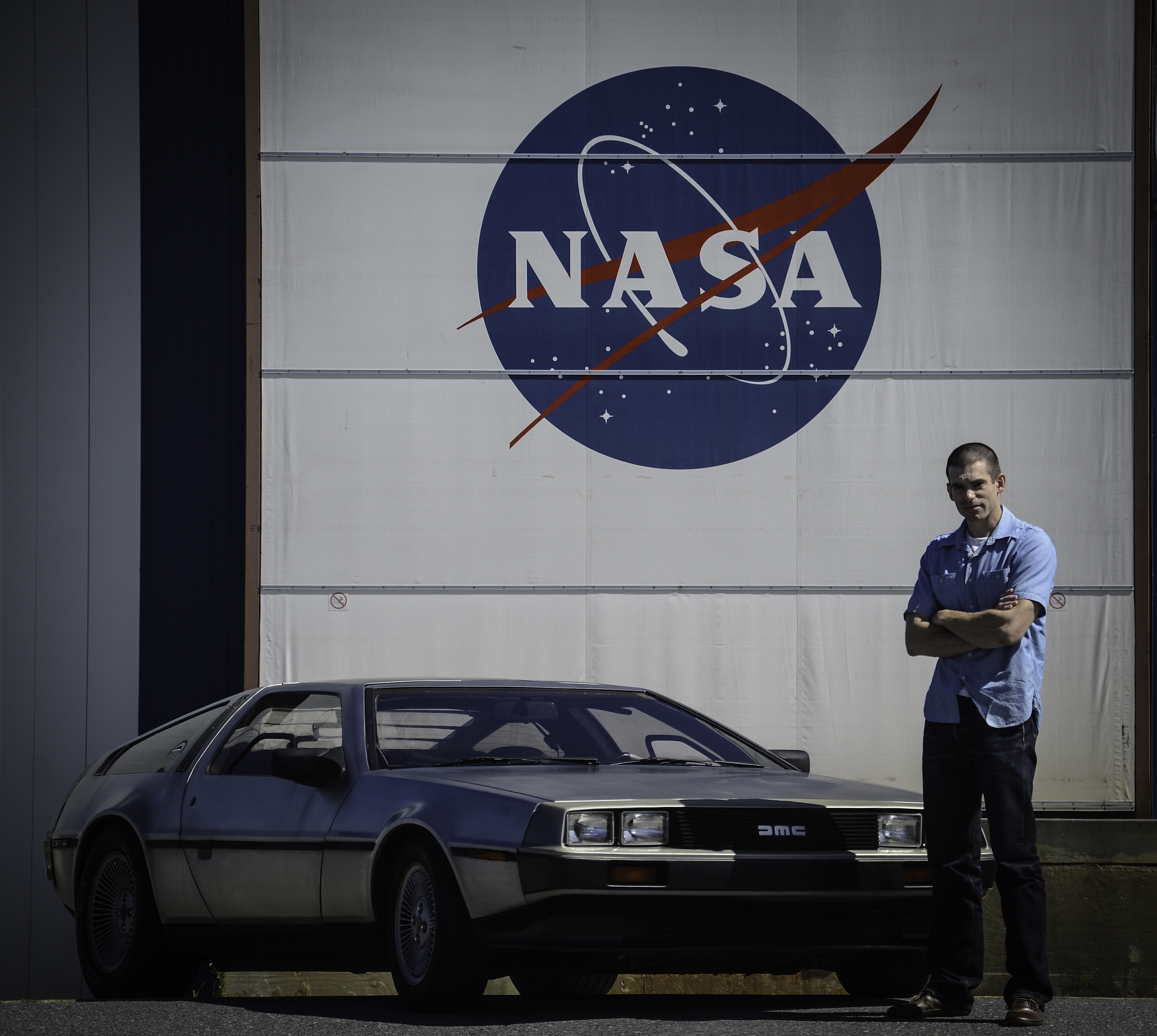
A NASA photo of original DeLorean time machine, bought by Goddard's Office of Communications as part of celebration of the Back to the Future day

- April 2015 : last publication of the French magazine (in French) Fiction, founded in 1953.
- October 21, 2015: worldwide celebration of the Back to the Future Part II Day. It coincided with the release of two working hoverboard prototypes by Hendo and Lexus; release of a Back to the Future documentary Back in Time and various other related fan events.

=== Deaths ===
- January 9 : Michel Jeury, French writer (born 1934).
- January 27 : Suzette Haden Elgin, American writer (born 1936)
- February 27 : Leonard Nimoy American actor, director, writer and playwright. (born 1931)
- March 12 : Terry Pratchett, British writer (born 1948)
- May 24 : Tanith Lee, British writer (born 1947)
- May 30 : Joël Champetier, Canadian writer (born 1957)
- June 7 : Christopher Lee, British actor (born 1922)
- June 10 : Wolfgang Jeschke, German writer (born 1936)
- October 27 : Ayerdhal, French writer (born 1959)
- December 25 : George Clayton Johnson, American writer (born 1929)

== Literary releases ==
=== Novels ===
- (in French) Léviathan, by Jack Campbell.
- Metro 2035, by Dmitry Glukhovsky.
- Nemesis Games, by James S. A. Corey
- (in French) The Produceurs, by Antoine Bello.
- Golden Son by Pierce Brown
- Aurora by Kim Stanley Robinson
- Killing Titan by Greg Bear
- Luna: New Moon by Ian McDonald
- Star Wars: Aftermath by Chuck Wendig.

=== Novellas ===
- The Vital Abyss by James S.A. Corey

=== Stories collections ===
- (in French) La Ménagerie de papier, by Ken Liu.

== Films ==
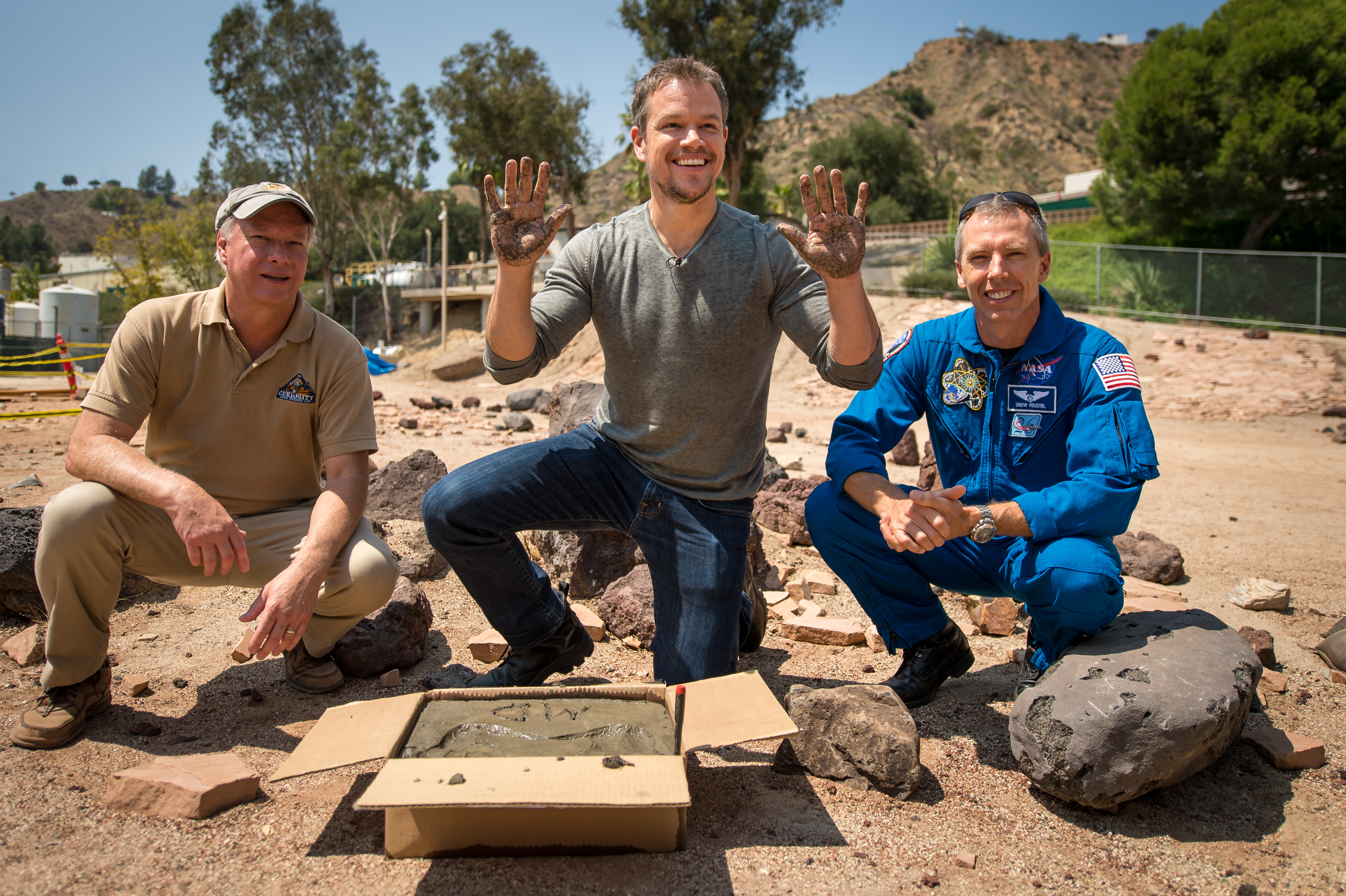
The Martian lead actor Matt Damon visits NASA Jet Propulsion Laboratory

=== Original/new franchise ===
- Area 51, by Oren Peli.
- Avril et le Monde truqué, by Franck Ekinci and Christian Desmares.
- Chappie, by Neill Blomkamp.
- Ex Machina, by Alex Garland.
- Impossible by Sun Zhou
- Jupiter Ascending, by The Wachowskis.
- The Martian, by Ridley Scott.
- Project Almanac, by Dean Israelite.
- Self/less, by Tarsem Singh.
- Tomorrowland, by Brad Bird.
- (in French) Subconscious, by Georgia Hilton.
- Z for Zachariah, by Craig Zobel.

=== Sequels, spin-offs and remakes ===
- The Divergent Series: Insurgent, by Robert Schwentke.
- Mad Max: Fury Road, by George Miller.
- Maze Runner: The Scorch Trials, by Wes Ball.
- Star Wars: The Force Awakens, by J. J. Abrams
- Terminator Genisys, by Alan Taylor.

== Television ==
=== New series ===
- 12 Monkeys
- Childhood's End
- Dark Matter
- The Expanse
- Humans
- Killjoys
- Minority Report
- Other Space

=== Returning series ===
- Doctor Who: series 9 and special episode The Husbands of River Song
- Rick and Morty (season 2)
- Star Wars Rebels (season #2).
- Steven Universe (season 2)

== Video games ==
- Halo 5: Guardians

== Awards ==
=== Hugo Award ===
- Best dramatic presentation (long form) - Guardians of the Galaxy
- Best dramatic presentation (short form) - Orphan Black: "By Means Which Have Never Yet Been Tried"

=== Nebula Award ===
Best novel: Annihilation by Jeff VanderMeer

Ray Bradbury Award: George Miller, Brendan McCarthy and Nico Lathouris for Mad Max: Fury Road

=== Locus Award ===
Best Science Fiction Novel: Ancillary Sword by Ann Leckie

=== Saturn Award ===
- Best science fiction film: Interstellar

=== Academy Award ===
- Interstellar for best visual effects.
- Big Hero 6 for best animated feature film.

== See also ==
- 2015 in science

Preceded by 2014	Science fiction by year 2015	Succeeded by 2016
