= 2013 in science fiction =

The year 2013 was marked in science fiction by the following events.

== Events ==
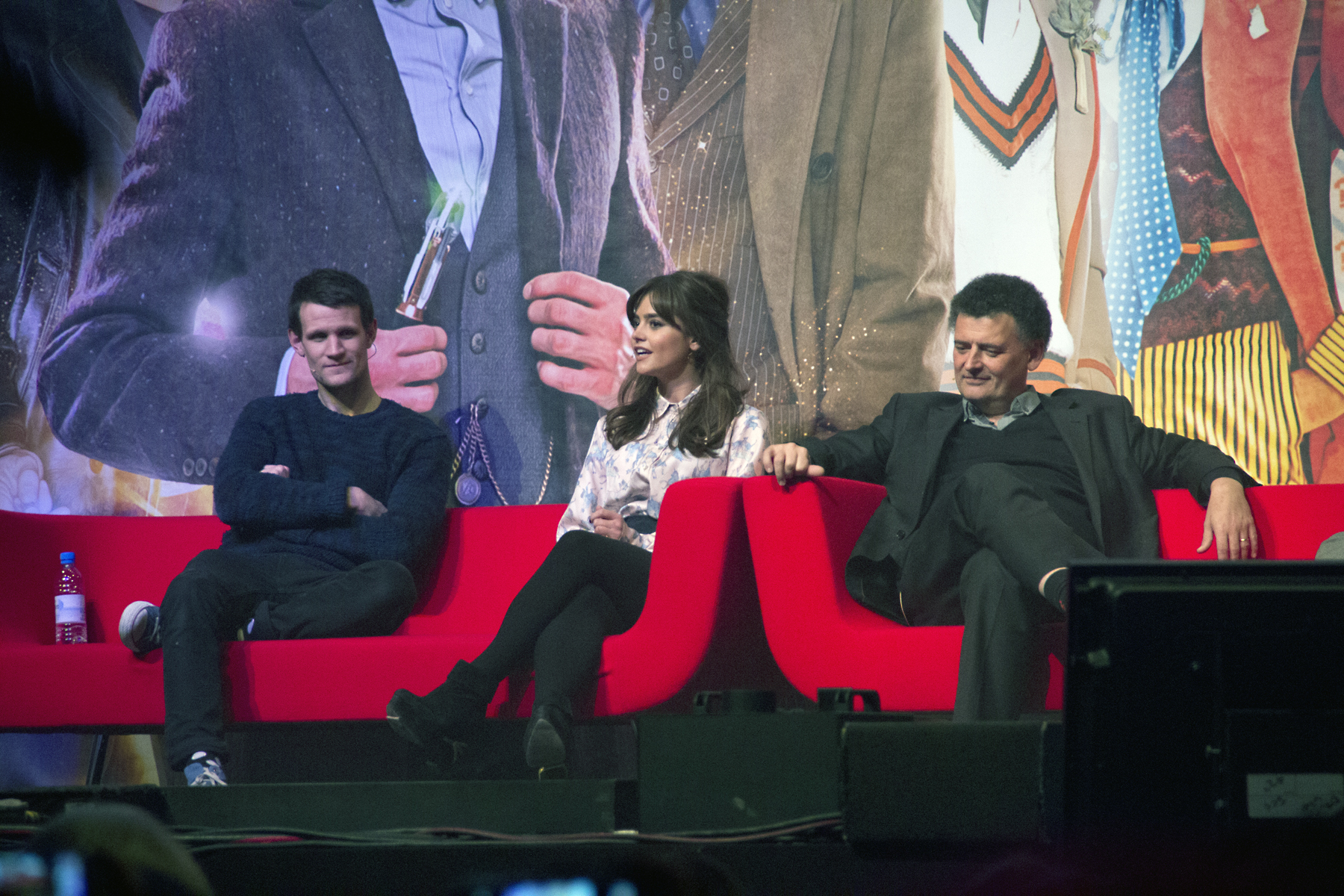
Actors Matt Smith and Jenna Coleman and producer Steven Moffat celebrating the 50th anniversary of Doctor Who

- November, 23: 50th anniversary of the Doctor Who franchise. It was highlighted by the release of The Day of the Doctor special episode, Doctor Who 50 years trailer, and fan celebrations worldwide.

== Deaths ==
- May 26 – Jack Vance, American writer (b. 1916 in science fiction)
- June 8 – John Boyd, American writer (b. 1919)
- June 9 – Iain M. Banks, Scottish writer (b. 1954)
- June 23 – Richard Matheson, American writer (b. 1926)
- July 10 – Gokulananda Mahapatra, Indian writer (b. 1922)
- September 2 – Frederik Pohl, American writer (b. 1919)

== Literature ==
- Earth Afire by Orson Scott Card
- Abaddon's Gate by James S.A. Corey
- Nichts von euch auf Erden by Reinhard Jirgl
- The Long War by Terry Pratchett and Stephen Baxter

== Films ==
- After Earth
- Coherence
- The Colony
- The Congress
- Dark Skies
- Elysium
- Ender's Game
- Europa Report
- Gravity
- Her
- The Hunger Games: Catching Fire
- The Last Days on Mars
- Pacific Rim
- Oblivion
- Riddick
- Snowpiercer
- Star Trek Into Darkness

== TV ==
- Defiance, season 1
- Doctor Who 2013 specials
- Falling Skies, season 3
- Orphan Black, season 1
- Revolution, season 2
- Rick and Morty
- Steven Universe
- The Tomorrow People
- Under the Dome, season 1

== Awards ==
=== Locus Award ===
- Best Science Fiction Novel - Redshirts by John Scalzi

=== Nebula Award ===
- Best novel: 2312 by Kim Stanley Robinson
- Ray Bradbury Award: Alfonso Cuarón and Jonás Cuarón for Gravity

=== Saturn Award ===
Best science fiction film: The Avengers

Preceded by 2012	Science fiction by year 2013	Succeeded by 2014
