= 1927 in science fiction =

The year 1927 was marked, in science fiction, by the following events.

== Births and deaths ==
=== Births ===
- June: Lynn Venable
- July 19 : Richard E. Geis, American writer (died 2013)
- July 25 : (in French) Pierre-Jean Brouillaud, French writer
- August 9 : Daniel Keyes, American writer (died 2014)
- October 3 : Donald R. Bensen, American writer and editor (died 1997)

== Awards ==
The main science-fiction Awards known at the present time did not exist at this time.

== Literary releases ==
=== Novels ===
- (in French) Radiopolis, by Otfrid von Hanstein.
- (in French) Dix mille lieues dans les airs, by Otfrid von Hanstein.
- (in Russian) The Garin Death Ray by Alexey N. Tolstoy.

=== Short stories ===
- The Colour Out of Space, by Howard Phillips Lovecraft.

== Audiovisual outputs ==
=== Movies ===
- Metropolis, by Fritz Lang.

== See also ==
- 1927 in science
- 1926 in science fiction
- 1928 in science fiction
