= Nanda Nandan Mahapatra =

Indian writer (born 1959)

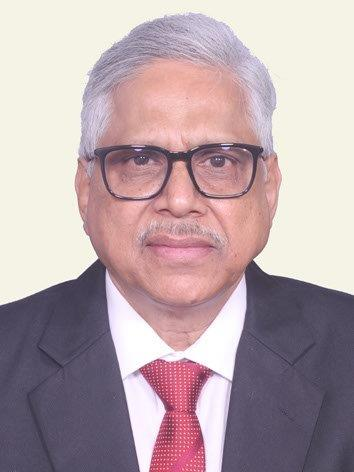
- Born: 14 March 1959 (age 67); Cuttack, Odisha, India
- Education: MSc, Phd
- Alma mater: Mumbai University; Utkal University
- Occupation: Textile Technocrat
- Spouse: Seemani Mahapatra
- Children: Nittisha Mahapatra; Sanchitta Mahapatra
- Parents: Gokulananda Mahapatra; Kumudini Mohapatra

Nanda Nandan Mahapatra (born 14 March 1959) is an Indian textile technocrat and author of books on textiles.

== Early life and education ==
N. N. Mahapatra was born in Cuttack, Odisha. He went on to do B.Sc. Tech in Textile Chemistry from University Department of Chemical Technology (UDCT) now it is ICT (Institute of Chemical Technology), Mumbai University and M.Sc. in Applied Chemistry from Ravenshaw College under Utkal University and was honored with PhD from the Utkal University. He also pursued M.B.A from Institute of Modern Management, Kolkata.

== Career ==
Mahapatra has authored over 10 books on textile fiber, dyes and dyeing. He is also popular as a speaker at various national and international seminars and conferences. He was the chairman of the Textile Institute (Manchester) Western Indian Section, and he was the vice-chairman of the Textile Association of India and was responsible for organising workshops, seminars and conferences related to Technology, Innovation, Sustainability and Environment. He received Textile Association of India award for the best book on Textiles for his book "Textile Processing."

== Honours and awards ==
- Mahapatra was awarded C Col. FSDC from Society of Dyers and Colourists (England) for his prestigious in the field of Wet Processing
- C Text FTI award received from The Textile Institute, Manchester, England
- FICS award received from Indian Chemical Society (India)
- FTA award received from The Textile Association (India)
- F.I.C award received from The Institution of Chemists (India)
- F.I.E award received from The Institution of Engineers (India) on 30 September 2009
- Received the CENTURY MILLS' Best Technical Book in Textiles Award for the book "Textile Processing"
- Received the Life Time Achievement Award for positive contributions in the field of Textile Engineering Area by Institution of Engineers (India),
- Received Award for Specialised services for Textile & Garment Industry from Garmek and Igmatex organization
- Received the Fellowship Award (FIIChE) from Indian Institution of Chemical Engineers (India)
- Received the Fellowship Award (FAIC) from The American Institute of Chemists,
- He has been admitted Council to The Royal Society of Chemistry as a FELLOW (FRSC, UK) His name is published in The Times (London) newspaper.

== Publications ==
- Energy Crisis and its solution
- Textile Dyes & Dyeing
- Textile Technology
- Textile Processing
- Textiles and Environment
- Textile Dyes
- Sarees of India
- Textile Dyeing
- Modern Textile Processing
- Textile Printing
- Processing of Fibres in Textile Industries
- Sarees of Odisha
- Functional Finishing of Textiles
