= The Crazy Ray =

1925 film by René Clair

Paris Qui Dort The Crazy Ray
- Directed by: René Clair
- Written by: René Clair
- Produced by: Henri Diamant-Berger (producer)
- Starring: Henri Rollan
- Cinematography: Maurice Desfassiaux; Paul Guichard
- Edited by: René Clair
- Music by: Jean Wiener
- Distributed by: Film Arts Guild
- Release date: 26 December 1924
- Running time: 65/55/35 minutes
- Country: France
- Languages: Silent film French intertitles

Paris Qui Dort (literally "Paris which sleeps") is a 1924 French science fiction comedy silent feature film (65 minutes) directed by René Clair. Also released as Le rayon de la mort (55 minutes), its international English-language titles were The Crazy Ray and Paris Asleep (usually 55 minutes). It has also been released in the US as a 35-minute short subject called At 3:25. by Red Seal Pictures.

== Plot summary ==
The film is about a mad doctor who uses a magic ray on citizens which causes them to freeze in strange and often embarrassing positions. People who are unaffected by the ray begin to loot Paris.

== Cast ==
- Henri Rollan as Albert
- Charles Martinelli as The scientist
- Louis Pré Fils as the detective
- Albert Préjean as The pilot
- Madeleine Rodrigue as Hesta, the airline passenger
- Myla Seller as The niece / daughter of the scientist
- Antoine Stacquet as The rich man
- Marcel Vallée as the thief

== Home media ==
The film is available on the Region 1 Criterion DVD release of another Clair film, Under the Roofs of Paris (1930). It is also available for free at the Internet Archive.

== See also ==
- 1924 in science fiction
