= 1933 in science fiction =

The year 1933 was marked, in science fiction, by the following events.

== Births and deaths ==
=== Births ===
- April 14 : Boris Strugatsky, Russian writer (died 2012)
- May 26 : Edward Whittemore, American writer (died 1995)
- August 7 : Jerry Pournelle, American writer (died 2017)
- August 15 : Alain Dorémieux, French writer (died 1998)

== Literary releases ==
=== Short stories ===
- The Horror in the Museum, by H. P. Lovecraft.
- Shambleau, by C. L. Moore.

== Movies ==
- The Invisible Man, by James Whale.
- The Tunnel, by Curtis Bernhardt.

== Awards ==
The main science-fiction Awards known at the present time did not exist at this time.

== See also ==
- 1933 in science
