= 2017 in science fiction =

The year 2017 was marked, in science fiction, by the following events.

== Events ==
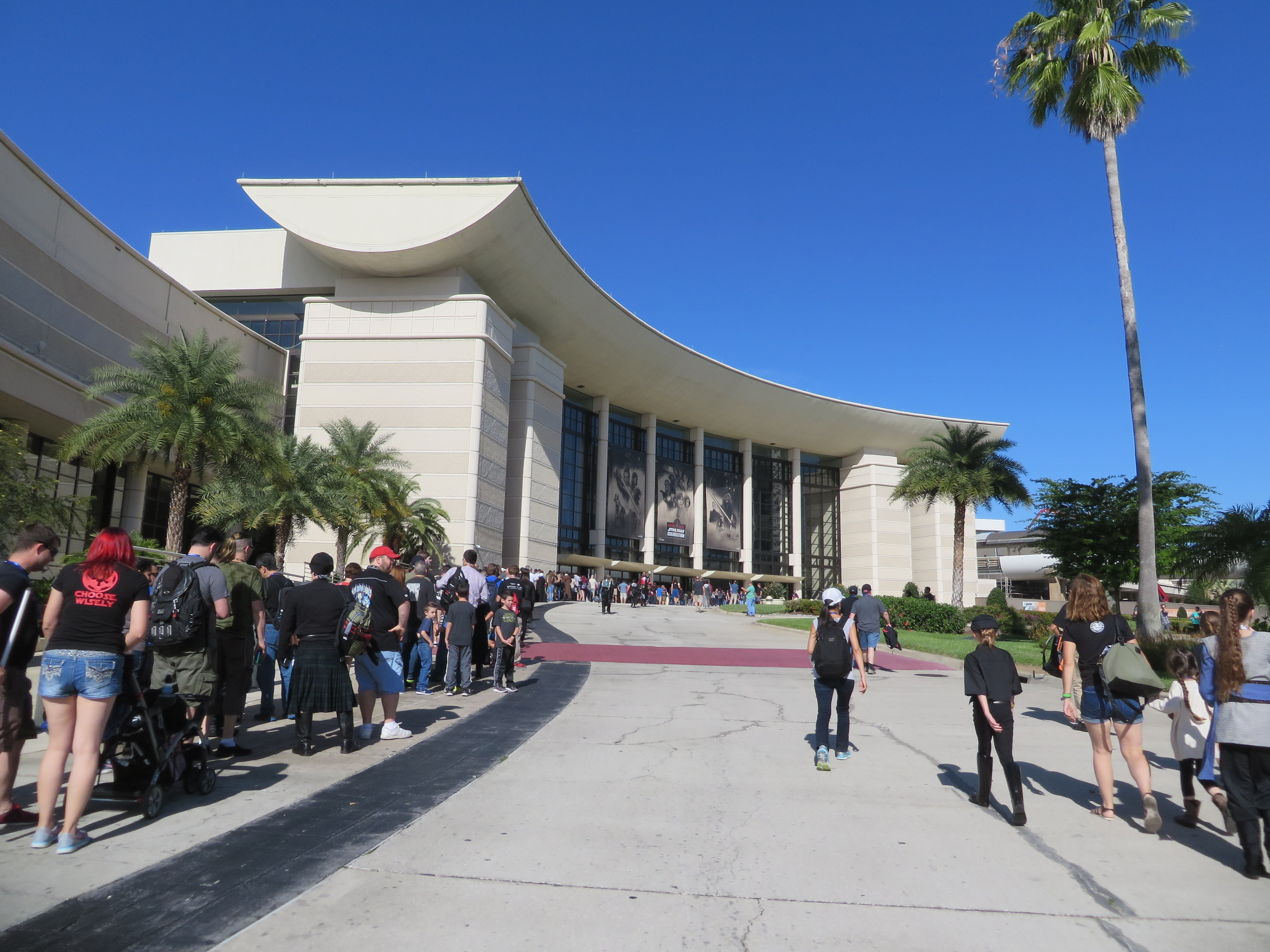
Fans line up at the entrance to Star Wars Celebration in Orlando to celebrate 40 years of Star Wars

- May 25 – 40th anniversary of Star Wars was celebrated by fans worldwide. The 2017 Star Wars Celebration convention in Orlando was dedicated to this date, and several anniversary collectibles were released.
- December 14 – Disney announced it would acquire 21st Century Fox for $52.4 billion. The deal includes rights for many science fiction franchises, such as Avatar, Alien, Futurama, Firefly, among others.

=== Deaths ===
- January 19 – Hilary Bailey, writer, critic and editor (The Fall of Frenchy Steiner, Frankenstein's Bride, Mrs Rochester, Fifty-First State)
- January 25 – John Hurt, English actor (Alien, Contact, Snowpiercer, Nineteen Eighty-Four, V for Vendetta)
- February 7 – Richard Hatch, American actor (Battlestar Galactica)
- February 10 – Edward Bryant, writer
- February 25 – Bill Paxton, American actor (The Terminator, Weird Science, Aliens, Predator 2, Edge of Tomorrow)
- March 22 – Daisuke Satō, writer (Highschool of the Dead, Imperial Guards, Seito, Red Sun Black Cross)
- March 26 – Marie Jakober, writer (The Mind Gods, The Black Chalice)
- April 5 – Huang Yi, writer (A Step into the Past)
- April 22 – William Hjortsberg, writer (Gray Matters, Legend)
- April 28 – Grania Davis, writer and editor (The Boss in the Wall, a.o.)
- June 9 – Adam West, American actor (Batman, Robinson Crusoe on Mars)
- July 15 – Martin Landau, American actor (Space: 1999)
- July 27 – H. A. Hargreaves, writer, professor
- August 3 – Jack Wodhams, writer (Ryn, Mostly Meantime)
- August 13 – Victor Pemberton, scriptwriter, television producer (Doctor Who)
- August 19 – Brian Aldiss, English writer (Super-Toys Last All Summer Long)
- August 31 – Richard Anderson, American actor (The Six Million Dollar Man, The Bionic Woman, Forbidden Planet)
- September 8 – Jerry Pournelle, writer, scientist, journalist
- September 10 – Len Wein, American comic book writer (Swamp Thing, Wolverine)
- September 15 – Harry Dean Stanton, American actor (Alien, Escape from New York, Repo Man, The Avengers)
- September 24 – Kit Reed, writer (The Attack of the Giant Baby, Thinner Than Thou, The Night Children, The Baby Merchant)
- October 9 – ElizaBeth Gilligan, author, former secretary for the Science Fiction Writers of America board of directors
- October 9 – Yoji Kondo aka. Eric Kotani, writer, editor and astrophysicist (Star Trek: Death of a Neutron Star, Requiem)
- October 17 – Julian May, writer (Saga of Pliocene Exile, Galactic Milieu Series)
- November 25 – Rance Howard, American actor (Independence Day, Cocoon, Mars Attacks!)

== Literary releases ==
- The Collapsing Empire by John Scalzi
- The Delirium Brief by Charles Stross
- Empire Games by Charles Stross
- Forgotten Worlds, The Silence #2 by D. Nolan Clark
- Martians Abroad by Carrie Vaughn
- New York 2140 by Kim Stanley Robinson
- Persepolis Rising by James S.A. Corey
- Seek and Destroy, America Rising #2 by William C. Dietz
- The Stone Sky, The Broken Earth #3 by N. K. Jemisin
- Vanguard: The Genesis Fleet by Jack Campbell
- Children of the Fleet by Orson Scott Card

== Films ==
=== Original ===
- Attraction, by Fyodor Bondarchuk
- Battle of Memories, by Leste Chen
- Before We Vanish, by Kiyoshi Kurosawa
- Dance to Death, by Andrei Volgin
- Life, by Daniel Espinosa
- Orbita 9 by Hatem Khraiche
- OtherLife, by Ben C. Lucas
- Valerian and the City of a Thousand Planets, by Luc Besson

=== Sequels, spin-offs and remakes ===
- Alien Covenant, by Ridley Scott
- Blade Runner 2049, by Denis Villeneuve
- Ghost in the Shell, by Rupert Sanders
- Star Wars: The Last Jedi, by Rian Johnson
- War for the Planet of the Apes, by Matt Reeves

== Television ==
- 12 Monkeys (season 3)
- Adventure Time (seasons 9+10)
- Agents of S.H.I.E.L.D. season 5
- Big Hero 6: The Series
- Colony (TV series) (season 2)
- The Defenders
- Dimension 404
- The Expanse (season 2)
- Extinct
- The Flash season 4
- The Gifted
- Gotham (season 4)
- The Handmaid's Tale
- Home: Adventures with Tip & Oh (season 2)
- I'm Not a Robot
- Infini-T Force
- Inhumans
- Iron Fist
- Kamen Rider Amazons Season 2
- Kamen Rider Build
- The Last Ship (season 4)
- Legends of Tomorrow season 3
- Legion
- Marvel Super Hero Adventures
- Miles from Tomorrowland (season 3)
- The Orville
- Philip K. Dick's Electric Dreams
- Power Rangers Ninja Steel
- The Punisher
- Rick and Morty (season 3)
- Runaways
- Salvation
- See You in Time
- Sense8 (season 2)
- Star Trek: Discovery
- Star Wars Rebels (season 3)
- Steven Universe (season 5)
- Stitch & Ai
- Supergirl season 3
- Time After Time
- Timeless
- Travelers (season 2)
- Uchu Sentai Kyuranger
- Voltron: Legendary Defender (seasons 2–4)

== Video games ==
- Destiny 2
- Endless Space 2
- Horizon Zero Dawn
- Mass Effect: Andromeda
- Nier Automata
- Prey
- Star Wars: Battlefront II

== Awards ==
=== Hugo Award ===
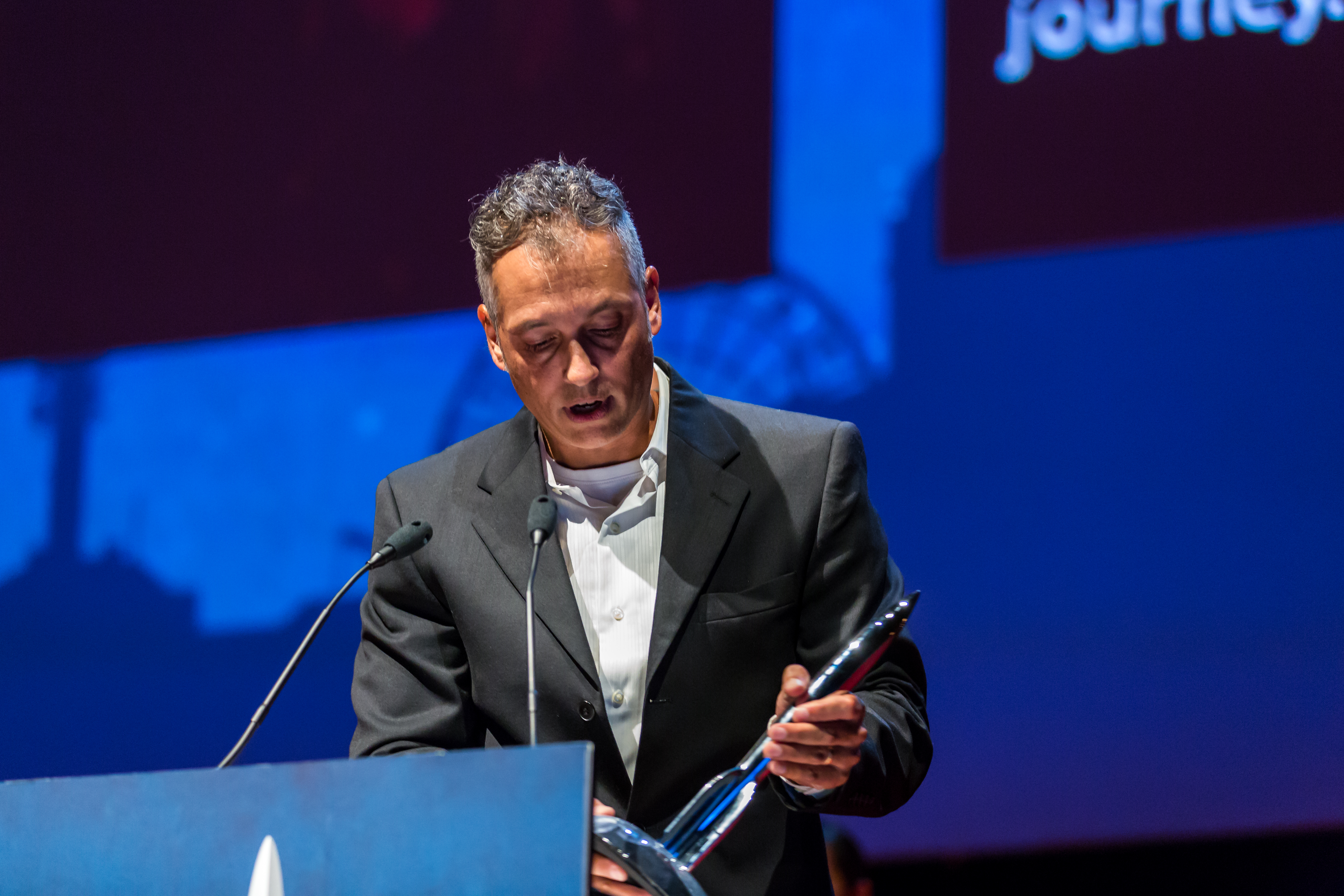
Producer of The Expanse Hawk Ostby accepting his Hugo Award

- Best dramatic presentation (long form) – Arrival
- Best dramatic presentation (short form) – The Expanse

=== Locus Award ===
Best Science Fiction Novel – Death's End by Liu Cixin

=== Saturn Award ===
- Best science fiction film: Rogue One: A Star Wars Story
- Best Science Fiction Television Series: Westworld

=== Academy Award ===
- Arrival for Best Sound Editing.

=== Nobel Award for literature ===
- Kazuo Ishiguro, author of 2005 science fiction novel Never Let Me Go.

== See also ==
Preceded by 2016	Science fiction by year 2017	Succeeded by 2018
