= 1923 in science fiction =

The year 1923 was marked, in science fiction, by the following events.

== Births and deaths ==
=== Births ===
- January 12: Pierre Versins, American writer (died 2001)
- April 17: Lloyd Biggle, Jr., American writer (died 2002)
- April 23: Avram Davidson, American writer (died 1993)
- July 12: James E. Gunn, American writer (died 2020)
- July 23: Cyril M. Kornbluth, American writer (died 1958)
- August 20: Henri Bessière, French writer (died 2011)
- November 1: Gordon R. Dickson, American writer (died 2001)

== Events ==
- March: first publication of Weird Tales, American pulp magazine.

== Awards ==
The main science-fiction Awards known at the present time did not exist at this time.

== Literary releases ==
=== Novels ===
- Aelita, by Aleksey Nikolayevich Tolstoy.
- (in French) La Poupée sanglante (The Bloody Doll), by Gaston Leroux.

== See also ==
- 1923 in science
- 1922 in science fiction
- 1924 in science fiction
