= Things to Come =

1936 film by William Cameron Menzies

- Theatrical release poster
- Directed by: William Cameron Menzies
- Screenplay by: H. G. Wells
- Based on: The Shape of Things to Come by H. G. Wells
- Produced by: Alexander Korda
- Starring: Raymond Massey; Edward Chapman; Ralph Richardson; Margaretta Scott; Cedric Hardwicke; Maurice Braddell; Sophie Stewart; Derrick De Marney; Ann Todd
- Cinematography: Georges Périnal
- Edited by: Charles Crichton; Francis D. Lyon
- Music by: Arthur Bliss
- Production company: London Films Productions
- Distributed by: United Artists
- Release date: 20 February 1936
- Running time: Cut: 93 minutes Restored: 97 minutes Original: 130 minutes (see below)
- Country: United Kingdom
- Language: English
- Budget: £300,000

Things to Come is a 1936 British science fiction film produced by Alexander Korda, directed by William Cameron Menzies, and written by H. G. Wells. It is a loose adaptation of Wells' book The Shape of Things to Come. The film stars Raymond Massey, Edward Chapman, Ralph Richardson, Margaretta Scott, Cedric Hardwicke, Maurice Braddell, Sophie Stewart, Derrick De Marney, and Ann Todd. Things to Come became a landmark in production design.

== Plot ==
In 1940, businessman John Cabal, living in the city of Everytown in Southern England, cannot enjoy Christmas Day as the news speaks of possible war. His guest, Harding, shares his worries, while another friend, the over-optimistic Pippa Passworthy, believes that it will not come to pass, and if it does, it will accelerate technological progress. An aerial bombing raid on the city that night results in general mobilisation and then global war with the unnamed enemy. Cabal becomes a Royal Air Force pilot and serves bravely, even attempting to rescue an enemy pilot he has shot down.

The war continues into the 1960s, long enough for the people of the world to have forgotten why they are fighting. Humanity enters a new dark age. Every city in the world is in ruins, the economy has been devastated by hyperinflation, and there is little technology left other than greatly depleted air forces. A pestilence known as "wandering sickness" is inflicted by aerial bombing and causes its victims to walk around aimlessly in a zombie-like state before dying. The plague kills half of humanity and extinguishes the last vestiges of government.

By 1970, the warlord Rudolf, known as the "Boss", has become the chieftain of what is left of Everytown and eradicated the pestilence by shooting the infected. He has started yet another war, this time against the "hill people" of the Floss Valley to obtain coal and shale to render into oil for his ragtag collection of prewar biplanes.

On May Day that year, a sleek new monoplane lands in Everytown, startling the residents, who have not seen a new aircraft in many years. The pilot, a now elderly John Cabal, emerges and proclaims that the last surviving band of engineers and mechanics have formed an organisation called "Wings Over the World". They are based in Basra, Iraq, and have outlawed war and are rebuilding civilisation throughout the Near East and the Mediterranean. Cabal offers the Boss the opportunity to join Wings, but he immediately rejects the offer and takes Cabal prisoner, forcing him to repair the obsolete biplanes.

With the assistance of Cabal, the Boss's disillusioned mechanic Gordon contacts Wings Over the World. Gigantic flying wing aircraft arrive over Everytown and saturate its population with a "Gas of Peace" that temporarily renders them unconscious. The people awaken to find themselves under the control of Wings Over the World and the Boss dead from a fatal allergic reaction to the gas. Cabal promises them that Wings Over the World will usher in a new age of progress and peace.

Under Cabal's guidance, Wings Over the World quickly rebuilds civilisation to even greater heights. By 2036, a stable mankind is now living in modern underground cities, including the new Everytown, and civilisation is at last devoted to peace and scientific progress. All is not well, however. The sculptor Theotocopulos incites the populace to demand a "rest" from all the rush of progress, symbolised by the coming first crewed flight around the Moon. When the mob threatens to destroy the space gun that will launch the ship to the Moon, Oswald Cabal, the grandson of John Cabal and current head of government, is forced to move the launch ahead of schedule.

Oswald Cabal's daughter Catherine and fellow scientist Maurice Passworthy are the passengers. After the projectile is launched and just a tiny light in the night sky, Cabal debates the desirability of human progress with Passworthy's anxious father. To Passworthy's concern that humanity shall never be able to rest, Cabal retorts that humans have no choice but to conquer the universe and its mysteries: "All the universe or nothingness — which shall it be?"

== Cast ==
=== Main cast ===
- Raymond Massey as John Cabal / Oswald Cabal
- Edward Chapman as Pippa Passworthy and Raymond Passworthy
- Ralph Richardson as Rudolf, "The Boss"
- Margaretta Scott as Roxana Black / Rowena Cabal
- Cedric Hardwicke as Theotocopulos
- Maurice Braddell as Dr. Edward Harding
- Sophie Stewart as Mrs Cabal
- Derrick De Marney as Richard Gordon
- Ann Todd as Mary Gordon
- Pearl Argyle as Catherine Cabal
- Kenneth Villiers as Maurice Passworthy
- Ivan Brandt as Morden Mitani
- Anne McLaren as The Child (2036)
- Patricia Hilliard as Janet Gordon
- Charles Carson as Great Grandfather (2036)

=== Uncredited ===
- Patrick Barr as World Transport official
- John Clements as enemy pilot
- Anthony Holles as Simon Burton
- Allan Jeayes as Mr. Cabal (1940)
- Pickles Livingston as Horrie Passworthy
- Abraham Sofaer as Wadsky

=== Notes ===
- Theotocopulos's scenes were originally shot with Ernest Thesiger. Wells found his performance unsatisfactory, so he was replaced with Hardwicke and the footage reshot.
- Terry-Thomas, who would become known for his comic acting, has an uncredited appearance as an extra in the film, playing a "man of the future".
- In some prints, Margaretta Scott is still credited with the dual role of Roxana Black and Rowena Cabal, but the latter character does not appear in the extant footage.

== Production ==
H.G. Wells described The Shape of Things to Come (1933) as more of a "discussion" than a novel. The book is presented as a series of notes by Dr. Philip Raven, a diplomat in the League of Nations. Alexander Korda deeply admired Wells and asked him to adapt the book into a film. Korda promised Wells complete control over the script.

Wells wrote a screenplay which abridges the book and introduces new elements. It also draws on Wells' "A Story of the Days to Come" (1897) and his work on society and economics The Work, Wealth and Happiness of Mankind (1931). Wells developed his theory of human progress through The Outline of History (1919–20) and its abridgement. In his mind, humanity was destined to proceed towards the stability of a world government.

The first draft of Wells' film treatment was titled "Whither Mankind?". By all accounts, it was terrible. Wells was too wedded to the ideas of his book and could not create sufficient incident to make a compelling screenplay. Lajos Bíró wrote a detailed memo to Korda about the flaws of Wells' treatment. Korda mused that Things to Come was his "most difficult film to make".

Wells' involvement in the film was heavily promoted during production, with photos of him on the set distributed to the media. The film was billed as "H. G. Wells' Things to Come". Korda spent lavishly on the film. Its budget was reported between £260–300,000.

After attending one of Arthur Bliss' lectures at the Royal Institution, Wells asked the composer to collaborate with him on the film score. Wells gave Bliss explicit instructions on the score's structure because he saw music as part of the film's design. Things to Come was edited to fit the score. Bliss turned his music into a concert suite which was widely performed and recorded. He also used the music from the film's machine sequence in his ballet Checkmate.

Wells wrote a memo to the production staff about the costumes. The technocrats of the future bear a striking resemblance to the samurai who benevolently rule the planet in his 1905 novel A Modern Utopia. The production memo also singles out Fritz Lang's Metropolis as completely antithetical to Wells' vision. He previously ridiculed the film in a 1927 New York Times review. Wells' visions of the future are feasible projections from existing technology like the Boyce Thompson Institute's plant science and Robert H. Goddard's rocketry.

Filming of exteriors began in July 1935 at Denham Film Studios, while the site was still under construction. The film was shot at Elstree Studios and Worton Hall.

After filming had already begun, the Hungarian abstract artist and experimental filmmaker László Moholy-Nagy was commissioned to produce some of the effects sequences for the re-building of Everytown. Moholy-Nagy's approach was partly to treat it as an abstract light show, but only some 90 seconds of material was used, e.g. a protective-suited figure behind corrugated glass. The footage was displayed independently. In the autumn of 1975 a researcher found a further four sequences which had been discarded.

The art design in the film is by Vincent Korda, brother of the producer. The futuristic city of Everytown in the film is based on London: a facsimile of St Paul's Cathedral can be seen in the background.

== Reception ==
Things to Come was voted the ninth best British film of 1936 by Film Weekly's readers. The film earned £350,000 and was the 16th most popular British film in 1935–36. Korda's extravagant budget made recouping his costs difficult, but the film's quality was widely seen as worth the investment. Over time, Things to Come did eventually turn a profit through reissues.

The Times remarked, "It is usually not until they have extinguished the present civilization of the world by war, famine...or some such spectacular catastrophe that our Utopian writers can settle down comfortably to planning new fashions in asbestos clothing." They had high praise for the concepts of the film and its production, "Even Mr. Raymond Massey, though always dignified, can hardly distract the attention from the incomparable scenery which is the real triumph of this film."

In his review for The Spectator, Graham Greene felt the first third was magnificent but lamented the "smug and sentimental" dialogue. Greene cited Wells' The War in the Air while praising the terrifying air raid in Things to Come. Frank Nugent reviewed the film for The New York Times and felt some passages "read like direct quotations from last week's newspapers." He grimly concluded, "There's nothing we can do now but sit back and wait for the holocaust."

Science fiction historian Gary Westfahl felt, "Things to Come qualifies as the first true masterpiece of science fiction cinema...the film's episodic structure and grand ambitions make it the greatest ancestor of Stanley Kubrick's 2001: A Space Odyssey".

Arthur C. Clarke was perplexed that Wells would be aware of rocket technology yet choose to depict Jules Verne's space gun in the movie. Nevertheless, he had Kubrick watch Things to Come early in the development phase of 2001. Clarke cited it as an example of grounded science fiction, but Kubrick disliked it. After seeing 2001, Frederik Pohl quipped, "...it's a disgrace that the most recent science-fiction movie made with a big budget, good actors and an actual sf writer preparing the script, not aimed at a juvenile market and uncontaminated by camp, is Things to Come...produced in 1936."

Cultural historian Christopher Frayling called Things to Come "a landmark in cinematic design." On the review aggregator website Rotten Tomatoes, 91% of 33 critics' reviews are positive. The website's consensus reads: "Eerily prescient in its presentation of a dystopian future, Things to Come's special effects may be somewhat dated, but its potent ideas haven't aged at all." In 2005, it was nominated for the AFI's 100 Years of Film Scores, a list of the top 25 film scores unveiled by the American Film Institute.

== Forecasts ==
In 1935, H.G. Wells adapted his screenplay into the book Things to Come, which includes production details and photos. It was reprinted in 1940 and 1975. In 2007, Things to Come was edited by Leon Stover and published as volume 9 in The Annotated H.G. Wells. The book spells out things that are left vague in the movie. The conflict in the first act is explicitly called "The Second World War" in the book.

The aerial bombardment of Everytown directly forecasted The Blitz of London from 1940–1. Michael Korda reports that when Adolf Hitler saw Things to Come, he instructed Hermann Göring to use it as inspiration for the Luftwaffe. Contrarily, it inspired Neville Chamberlain's appetite for peace. Wells' work was sometimes blamed as the inspiration for the appeasement policy that led to the Munich Agreement.

Wells describes the "walking sickness" of Things to Come as analogous to sheep afflicted with gid. Though zombie films had already been established, Wells clearly anticipates the post-apocalyptic scenario that would dominate the genre.

A helicopter is also shown in the film before the design had been stabilized. Although the one seen onscreen does have a tail rotor, it is not a conventional tail rotor by modern-day standards.

== Duration, releases, and surviving versions ==
The rough cut of the film was 130 minutes in length, while the version submitted for classification by the British Board of Film Censors (BBFC) was 117m 13s. By the time of the 21 February 1936 UK premiere and initial release, this had been reduced to 108m 41s, while the American print premiered on 18 April 1936 was further cut to 96m 31s. By late 1936, a 98m 07s print was on general release in the UK, and a 76m 07s print was resubmitted for classification by the BBFC and was passed – after further cuts – at 72m 13s for a reissue in 1943 by Exclusive Films, a film distribution company co-founded by William Hinds.

The 96m 31s American print was cut down to 93m 19s by the removal of three sections of footage for a reissue by British Lion Films in 1948, and subsequently to 92m 44s by the removal of one more segment. A continuity script exists for a version of approximately 106m 04s, which contains all the material in the 96m 31s and 92m 44s versions, plus a number of other sequences. It is not known if a version of this duration was actually in circulation at any time, or if it was simply an intermediate stage between the premiere and general release versions.

For many years, the principal surviving version of the film was the 92m 44s print (in countries using PAL or SECAM video systems, it runs to 89m exactly). From at least the late-1970s until 2007, this was the only version "officially" available from the rights holders in the UK. In the United States, although the 92m 44s version was most prevalent, a version was also in circulation that included the four pieces of footage that were in the 96m 31s print, but not the 92m 44s version, although due to other cuts, actually ran shorter than the latter.

== Home media ==
A cut version of the 93-minute print was digitally restored and colourised by Legend Films, under the supervision of Ray Harryhausen and released on DVD in the United States in early 2007.

In May 2007, Network DVD in the UK released a digitally restored 97-minute version, the longest version remaining of the film. The two-disc set also contains a "Virtual Extended Version" with most of the missing and unfilmed parts represented by production photographs and script extracts. In 2011 Network released an updated and expanded version of this edition on Blu-ray in HD.

The Criterion Collection released the 97-minute print on DVD and Blu-ray in North America in 2013. Moholy-Nagy's footage - including unused shots - was included as an extra.

== Copyright status ==
The current copyright holder is ITV Global Entertainment Ltd., and while the longest surviving original nitrate print is held by the BFI National Archive, a copy of the 97-minute print was donated by London Films to the newly formed National Film Library in March 1936.

== See also ==
- The Man Who Could Work Miracles, a 1937 film based on Wells' short story of the same name, which Wells co-wrote with Lajos Bíró
- H. G. Wells' The Shape of Things to Come, a 1979 Canadian space opera film
- List of incomplete or partially lost films
- 1936 in science fiction
