= Revolt on Alpha C =

1955 novel by Robert Silverberg

- First edition
- Author: Robert Silverberg
- Language: English
- Genre: Young adult science fiction
- Publisher: Thomas Y. Crowell Co.
- Publication date: 1955
- Publication place: United States
- Media type: Print (hardcover; later paperback)
- Pages: 148 pp (first edition)
- OCLC: 1211870
- LC Class: PZ7.S5858 Re

Revolt on Alpha C is a juvenile science fiction novel by American writer Robert Silverberg, published by Crowell in 1955. It was Silverberg's first published book.

== Plot summary ==
The story takes place in the year 2363. The protagonist is Cadet Larry Stark, a 20-year-old, fresh graduate of the Space Patrol Academy who comes from a long line of Space Patrol commanders. As the story begins, he is embarking on the customary final training cruise on the interstellar ship Carden. At the end of this cruise, he will be awarded a commission as officer of the Space Patrol. The ship makes the four and a half light-year journey to the star Alpha Centauri in a span of 15 days using the faster-than-light overdrive. The fourth planet orbiting Alpha C, an earth-like planet inhabited by dinosaurs, has been colonized 125 years earlier.

Cadet Stark, who has been taught to obey orders and to trust the infallibility of Earth and the Space Patrol, arrives at planet IV of Alpha C just as the colonists are voting to declare, and possibly fight for, their independence from Earth. The arrival of the Carden and its crew can potentially affect the course of events in this revolution. The young cadet, for the first time in his life, must choose the proper and honorable course of action in a situation where there is no clear right and wrong. The consequences of his actions may place in jeopardy his career with the Space Patrol and the love of his father.

== Characters ==
The character named Harl Ellison was named after science fiction writer Harlan Ellison, who was a neighbor of Silverberg in New York at the time he was writing the book. This was confirmed in a special edition on the occasion of Silverberg's 35th year in the business.

== Reception ==
Galaxy reviewer Floyd C. Gale praised the novel as "a fast-moving story ... that I would have liked when I was a youngster."

Kirkus Reviews also called it "fast moving science fiction".

== See also ==
- 1955 in science fiction
