= The Secret of Saturn's Rings =

1954 novel by Donald A. Wollheim

- First edition
- Author: Donald A. Wollheim
- Cover artist: Alex Schomburg
- Language: English
- Genre: science-fiction novel
- Published: 1954 (John C. Winston Co.)
- Publication place: United States
- Pages: 207
- OCLC: 1279359

The Secret of Saturn's Rings is a science-fiction novel by Donald A. Wollheim and was first published in the United States by the John C. Winston Company in 1954. This is the first of three novels that Wollheim wrote for the Winston Company, the other two being The Secret of the Martian Moons (1955) and The Secret of the Ninth Planet (1959).

This is also one of the thirty-five juvenile novels that comprise the Winston Science Fiction set, which novels were published in the 1950s for a readership of teen-aged boys. The typical protagonist in these books was a boy in his late teens who was proficient in the art of electronics, a hobby that was easily available to the readers. It was his proficiency in that art that enabled Bruce Rhodes to detect an act of sabotage on his father's rocket ship.

== Plot ==
On the day of his graduation from high school Bruce Rhodes finds his classmates shunning him. He discovers that his father, Dr. Emanuel Rhodes, who has worked for the Terraluna Corporation for thirty years, most of that time as head of research, has been fired and the corporation is now smearing him. With a borrowed United Nations exploration ship, Dr. Rhodes intends to lead an expedition to Saturn, farther from Earth than anyone has ever gone.

Dr. Rhodes explains that he has discovered that a nuclear-explosion-driven mining machine that he invented for Terraluna will actually blast the moon apart, sending debris raining down onto Earth and destroying civilization. Terraluna's executives had dismissed him (in both senses of the term) as a crackpot, so he went to the United Nations. Requiring additional proof of his hypothesis, the United Nations has loaned him a ship so that he can go to Saturn to determine whether the planet's rings are the remains of an exploded moon.

With the other three members of the crew – able spaceman Arpad Benz (who will work with Bruce), astrogator Frank Garcia, and pilot Kurt Jennings – Bruce and his father board the ship and prepare for liftoff. The ship is launched up the side of a mountain, much of the initial boost being provided by a series of magnetic rings (similar to the ringroad that Robert Heinlein described in Starman Jones). Soon they're on their way to the moon to top off their fuel tanks, knowing that Terraluna intends to use every filthy, vile trick in the corporate playbook to stop them. In spite of those tricks, they land on Mimas, Saturn's innermost moon, and set up camp. Immediately Dr. Rhodes takes one of the rocketship's two lifeboats and flies it into the rings. Radio contact is lost as the signal is lost in intense static. While waiting for radio contact to resume, Bruce and the others find artefacts, signs that an alien city once occupied the ground on which they stand and has since crumbled into the gravel on which their ship and camp sit.

When radio contact still has not been reestablished and only one day remains before the expedition must leave Saturn to return to Earth, Bruce takes the other lifeboat and flies into the rings. With some effort and luck he finds his father, whose rocketboat had broken down, and the two men return to Mimas just in time to see Garcia and Benz take off in their rocketship and head for Hidalgo. So intent are Garcia and Benz on running the ship that they don't notice the lifeboat landing behind them.

Marooned, the Rhodeses decide to write down descriptions of their discoveries for future explorers to find. While the Rhodeses are exploring, two of the villains arrive, but an old Saturnian cannon destroys their ship and kills them. In the wreckage of the ship Bruce and his father find three fuel tanks, intact and full. With nothing to lose, they fuel up an old Saturnian rocket and blast off. Shedding parts as it goes, the rickety craft barely gets the men to the asteroid Hidalgo, where Garcia and Benz run to greet them and the four men settle down for a long and successful journey to Earth.

== Publication history ==
- 1954, US, John C. Winston Co., Feb 1954, Hardback (xi+207 pp)
- 1955, Italy, Arnoldo Mondadori Editore (I Romanzi di Urania #70), Feb 1955, Paperback Digest (128 pp), as Il Mistero di Saturno (The Mystery of Saturn)
- 1956, Germany, Pabel (Utopia Grossband #45), Dec 1956, Paperback Digest (89 pp), as Das Geheimnis der Saturnringe (The Secret of Saturn's Rings)
- 1958, Sweden, Wennerberg (Rymd-böckerna #9), Paperback, as Planetringarnas Gåta (The Ringed Planet's Riddle)
- 1959, US, John C. Winston Co., Jun 1959, Hardback (xi+207 pp)
- 1960, France, Les Editions Daniber (Daniber-Science Fiction-Suspense #5), Apr 1960, Paperback (190 pp), as Le Secret des Anneaux de Saturne (The Secret of Saturn's Rings)
- 1966, US+Canada, Paperback Library (#52-996), Aug 1966, Paperback (159 pp)
- 1978, Italy, Libra Editrice (Saturno. Collana de fantascienza #9), Jun 1978, Hardback (176 pp), as Il Mystero di Saturno (The Mystery of Saturn)

== Reviews ==
The book was reviewed by

- Groff Conklin at Galaxy Science Fiction (Nov 1954)
- The Editor at The Magazine of Fantasy and Science Fiction (Dec 1954)
- P. Schuyler Miller at Analog Science Fiction/Science Fact (May 1967)
- an unnamed reviewer in Library Journal (Vol. 79, 1954) – "excitement and suspense... recommended".

== Listings ==
The book is listed at

- The Library of Congress as http://lccn.loc.gov/54005068
- The British Library as UIN = BLL01003965634
