= 2016 in science fiction =

The year 2016 is marked, in science fiction, by the following events.

== Events ==
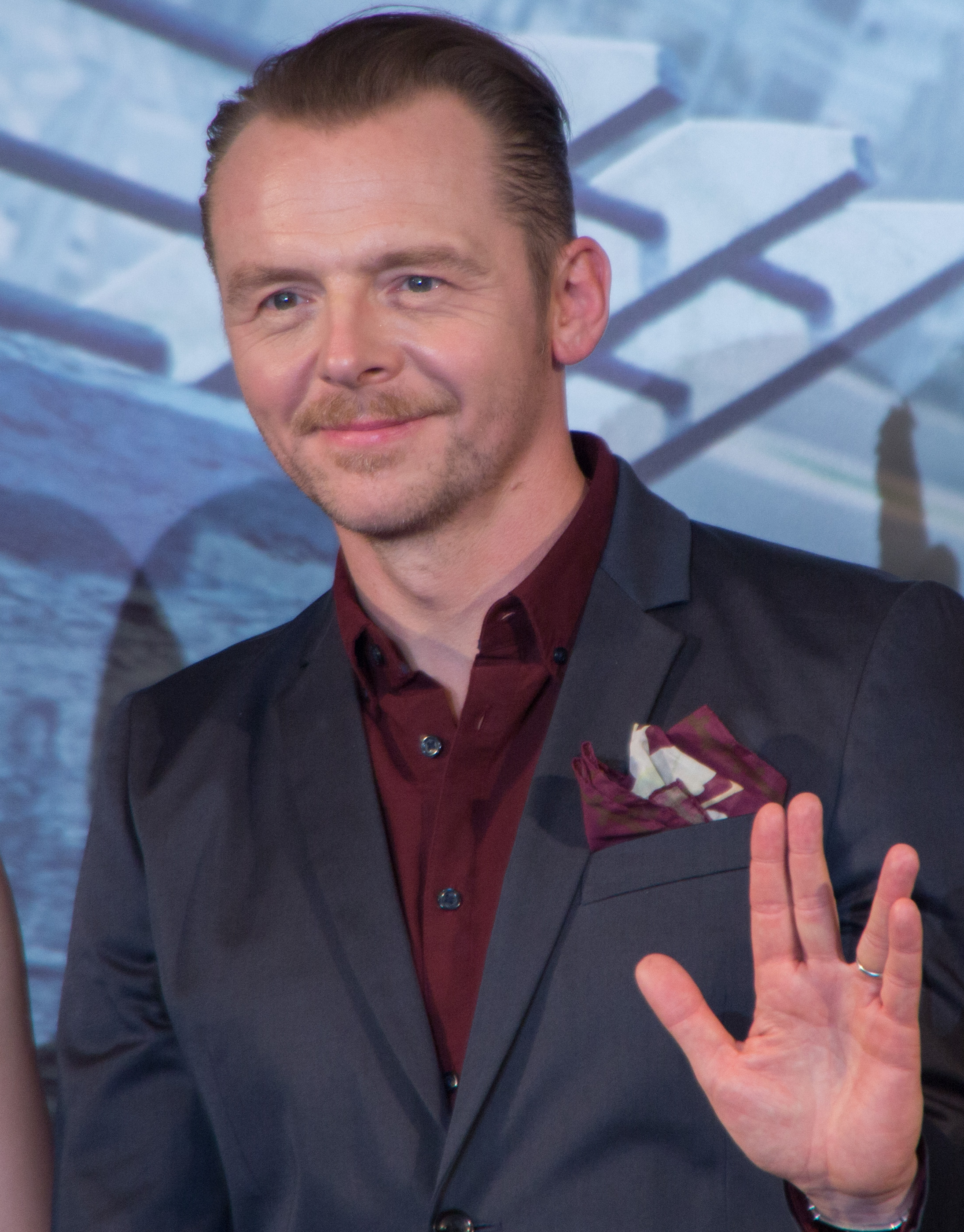
Star Trek writer and actor Simon Pegg giving a Vulcan salute in 2016

- September 8: worldwide celebration of the 50th anniversary of Star Trek franchise.

=== Deaths ===
- January 10 – David Bowie – English actor (The Man Who Fell to Earth, The Prestige) and rock singer who composed multiple science fiction-themed songs, including Space Oddity and the whole Ziggy Stardust album (born 1947)
- January 14 – Alan Rickman – British actor (Galaxy Quest, The Hitchhiker's Guide to the Galaxy) (born 1946)
- June 19 – Anton Yelchin – Russian-American actor, played Pavel Chekov in the Star Trek reboot film series (born 1989)
- July 26 – Jerry Doyle – American actor, known for his work as Michael Garibaldi in show Babylon 5 (born 1956)
- August 13 – Kenny Baker – English actor, known for playing R2-D2 in Star Wars (born 1934)
- September 25 – Robert Weinberg – Science fiction writer (born 1946)
- November 25 – Ron Glass – American actor (Firefly) (born 1945)
- December 24 – Richard Adams, British writer (born 1920)
- December 27 – Carrie Fisher – American actress, known for playing Princess Leia in Star Wars (born 1956)

== Literary releases ==
=== Novels ===
- Version Control, by Dexter Palmer
- Sleeping Giants, by Sylvain Neuvel
- The Everything Box, by Richard Kadrey
- Join, by Steve Toutonghi
- The Swarm by Orson Scott Card and Aaron Johnson
- Babylon's Ashes by James S.A. Corey
- Take Back the Sky by Greg Bear
- 71 by David Brin
- 2140 by Kim Stanley Robinson
- Raithe of the Boedecken by Matthew Stover
- Morning Star by Pierce Brown
- All the Birds in the Sky by Charlie Jane Anders

=== Short stories ===
Dissolution of the Sovereign: A Time Slide Into the Future (Or: A Non-Abled Offender's Exercise in Jurisprudence) by Elysia Crampton

== Movies ==
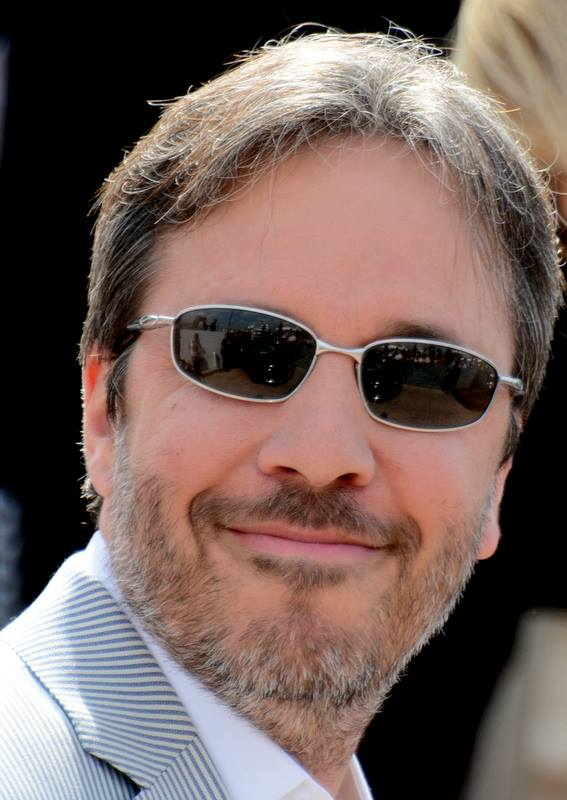
Denis Villeneuve directed Arrival, the most critically acclaimed sci-fi film of 2016

=== Original/new franchise ===
- The 5th Wave, by J Blakeson
- 24, by Vikram Kumar
- Arrival, by Denis Villeneuve and Eric Heisserer
- Assassin's Creed, by Justin Kurzel
- Equals, by Drake Doremus
- The Girl with All the Gifts, by Colm McCarthy
- The Glass Fortress, by Alain Bourret
- Midnight Special, by Jeff Nichols
- Morgan, by Luke Scott
- Passengers, by Morten Tyldum

=== Sequels, spin-offs and remakes ===
- 10 Cloverfield Lane, by Dan Trachtenberg
- The Divergent Series: Allegiant, by Robert Schwentke
- Independence Day: Resurgence, by Roland Emmerich
- Rogue One: A Star Wars Story, by Gareth Edwards
- Star Trek Beyond, by Justin Lin

== Television ==
- 11.22.63, by Bridget Carpenter
- 12 Monkeys, season 2, by Terry Matalas and Travis Fickett
- 3%, by Pedro Aguilera
- Adventure Time, season 8, by Pendleton Ward
- Colony, by Carlton Cuse and Ryan J. Condal
- Daredevil, season 2, by Drew Goddard
- The Expanse by Mark Fergus, Hawk Ostby
- Future-Worm!, by Ryan Quincy
- Home: Adventures with Tip & Oh, by Ryan Crego and Thurop Van Orman
- The Last Ship, season 3, by William Brinkley
- Macross Delta
- Miles from Tomorrowland, season 2, by Sascha Paladino
- The OA, by Brit Marling and Zal Batmanglij
- Sonic Boom, season 2
- Star Wars Rebels, season 2, by Simon Kinberg, Dave Filoni, Carrie Beck
- Steven Universe, seasons 3+4, by Rebecca Sugar
- Stranger Things, by The Duffer Brothers
- Timeless, by Eric Kripke and Shawn Ryan
- Travelers, by Brad Wright
- (in French) Trepalium, by Antarès Bassis, Sophie Hiet and (in French) Vincent Lannoo
- Westworld, by Jonathan Nolan
- The X-Files (season 10), by Chris Carter

== Video games ==
- Stellaris, a 4X Strategy game by Paradox
- No Man's Sky, by Hello Games
- The Technomancer, by Spiders (company)
- Destiny: Rise of Iron, by Bungie
- Overwatch, by Blizzard Entertainment
- Deus Ex: Mankind Divided, by Eidos Montréal

== Awards ==
=== Hugo Award ===
- Best novel: N. K. Jemisin The Fifth Season
- Best dramatic presentation (long form) – The Martian

=== Locus Award ===
Best Science Fiction Novel: Ancillary Mercy by Ann Leckie

=== Saturn Award ===
- Best science fiction film: Star Wars: The Force Awakens
- Best Science Fiction Television Series: Continuum

=== Academy Award ===
- Mad Max: Fury Road: 6 Oscars for Best Film Editing, Best Sound Editing, Best Sound Mixing, Best Production Design, Best Costume Design, Best Makeup and Hairstyling.
- Ex Machina for best visual effects

== See also ==
- 2016 in science

Preceded by 2015	Science fiction by year 2016	Succeeded by 2017
