= 1921 in science fiction =

The year 1921 was marked, in science fiction, by the following events.

== Births and deaths ==
=== Births ===
- January 14: Kenneth Bulmer, British writer (died 2005)
- January 25: Russell Braddon, Australian writer (died 1995)
- May 23: James Blish, American writer (died 1975)
- May 31: Arthur Sellings, British writer (died 1968)
- June 6: Francis G. Rayer, British writer (died 1981)
- August 11: (in French) Henri Viard, French writer (died 1989)
- August 19: Gene Roddenberry, American television screenwriter, producer and creator of the original Star Trek television series (died 1991)
- September 12: Stanisław Lem, polish writer (died 2006)
- October 7: H. H. Hollis, American writer (died 1977)
- November 9: Alfred Coppel, American writer (died 2004)
- Vladimir Colin, writer (died 1991)

== Awards ==
The main science-fiction Awards known at the present time did not exist at this time.

== Literary releases ==
=== Short stories ===
- (in French) L'Homme truqué, by (in French) Maurice Renard

== See also ==
- 1921 in science
- 1920 in science fiction
- 1922 in science fiction
