= 2014 in science fiction =

The year 2014 was marked by the following events in science fiction.

== Events ==
- April - Lucasfilm announced that Star Wars expanded universe is no more considered Star Wars canon.
- End of the British magazine SciFiNow.

=== Deaths ===
- February 16 : Michael Shea, American writer (born in 1946).
- March 18 : Lucius Shepard, American writer (born in 1943).
- May 12 : H. R. Giger, Swiss artist (born 1940)
- May 30 : Michael Szameit, German writer (born in 1950).
- June 1 : Jay Lake, American writer (born in 1964).
- June 15 : Daniel Keyes, American writer (born in 1927).
- June 30 : Frank M. Robinson, American writer (born in 1926).
- July 13 : Thomas Berger, American writer (born in 1924).

== Literary releases ==
=== Novels ===
- Annihilation, by Jeff VanderMeer.
- Ancillary Sword, by Ann Leckie.
- (in French) Imperfect Sword, by John G. Hemry.
- (in French) Steadfast, by John G. Hemry.
- (in French) Involution, by Johan Heliot.
- (in German) Der Jesus-Deal, by Andreas Eschbach.
- (in French) Maul: Lockdown, by Joe Schreiber.
- Mentats of Dune, by Brian Herbert and Kevin J. Anderson.
- Catacombes and Hooligans, the two first novels of the trilogy (in French) Les Particules réfractaires, by Mikhaïl W. Ramseier.
- Cibola Burn by James S.A. Corey
- Earth Awakens by Orson Scott Card
- War Dogs by Greg Bear

=== Novellas ===
- The Churn by James S.A. Corey

=== Comics ===
- Brane Zéro, tome 1, first volume of the serie (in French) Brane Zéro, written and drawn by (in French) Mathieu Thonon.
- Réalité, second volume of the serie (in French) Entre-Monde, by Yanouch.

== Films ==
=== Original ===
- The Anomaly, by Noel Clarke.
- Area 51, by Oren Peli.
- Bugs, by Yan Jia
- Divergent, by Neil Burger.
- Edge of Tomorrow, by Doug Liman.
- Extraterrestrial, by Colin Minihan.
- The Giver, by Phillip Noyce.
- Guardians of the Galaxy, by James Gunn.
- Interstellar, by Christopher Nolan.
- The Maze Runner, by Wes Ball.
- Lucy, by Luc Besson.
- Predestination, by the Spierig brothers.
- Project Almanac, by Dean Israelite.
- The Last Druid: Garm Wars, by Mamoru Oshii.
- Schnitzel, by Asaf Epstein.
- Space Station 76, by Jack Plotnick.
- Transcendence, by Wally Pfister.
- Zero Theorem, by Terry Gilliam.

=== Sequels, spin-offs and remakes ===
- Dawn of the Planet of the Apes, by Matt Reeves.
- Monsters: Dark Continent, by Tom Green.
- RoboCop, by José Padilha.
- Transformers: Age of Extinction, by Michael Bay.

== Television ==
- The 100, by Kass Morgan and Jason Rothenberg.
- 2Day, created by Ben Wiener and Manu De Maleprade, directed by Ben Wiener.
- Ascension, by Philip Levens and Adrian A. Cruz.
- Star Wars Rebels : season #1.

== Video games ==
- Elite: Dangerous, developed and edited by Frontier Developments.
- Wasteland 2, developed and edited by inXile Entertainment and Obsidian Entertainment.
- Destiny

== Awards ==
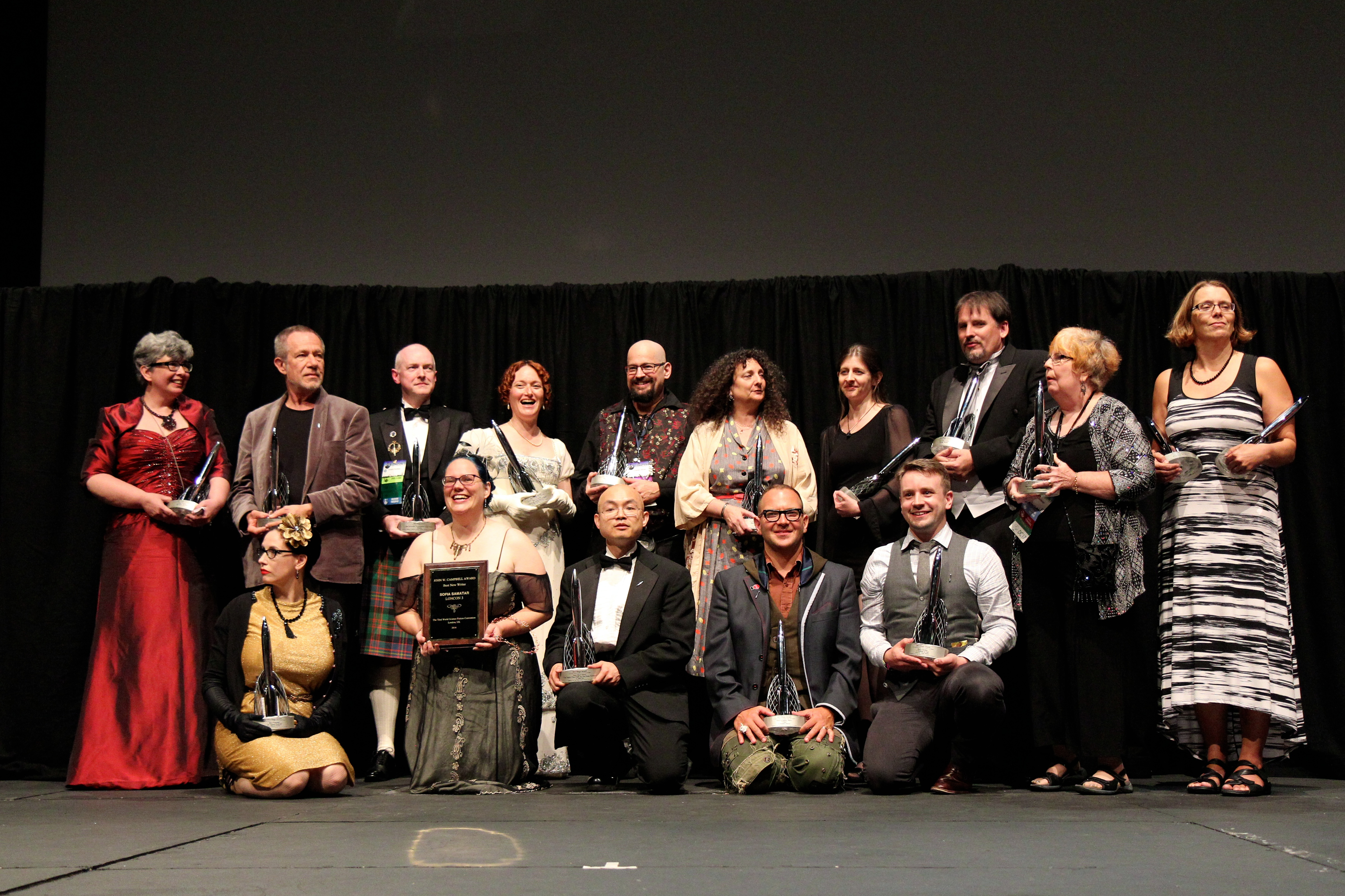
Hugo Award winners in 2014

=== Hugo Award ===
- Best dramatic presentation (long form) - Gravity

=== Nebula Award ===
- Best novel: Ancillary Justice by Ann Leckie
- Ray Bradbury Award: James Gunn and Nicole Perlman for Guardians of the Galaxy

=== Locus Award ===
Best Science Fiction Novel: Abaddon's Gate by James S. A. Corey

=== Saturn Award ===
- Best science fiction film: Gravity

=== Academy Award ===
- Gravity: 7 Oscars for best visual effects, Best Director, Best Original Score, Best Cinematography, Best Film Editing, Best Sound Editing, and Best Sound Mixing.
- Her for Best Original Screenplay.

== See also ==
- 2014 in science

Preceded by 2013	Science fiction by year 2014	Succeeded by 2015
