= Esli =

Russian science fiction magazine

- Editor: Nikolai Yutanov
- Categories: Science fiction short stories, futurology
- Frequency: Monthly (1991-2012), bimonthly (2015-2016)
- Publisher: Corvus
- Founded: 1991
- Final issue: 2016
- Country: Russia
- Based in: Moscow
- Language: Russian
- Website: http://www.esli.ru/
- ISSN: 1680-645X

Esli (Russian: Если, Russian for "If") was a Russian science fiction literary magazine. It was started in 1991 in Moscow, as a publisher of foreign SF stories, but soon broadened its format to include Russophone writers as well. In the 2000s, Esli also started publishing fantasy short stories and articles on futurology.

The magazine won the European Science Fiction Award (Eurocon award) for best science fiction magazine in 2000.

Esli closed down by the end of 2012 due to retailing problems. In late 2015, the magazine was relaunched with a new team and a new, futurology-centered subject. It was suspended again in the late 2016.

== See also ==
- If, American science fiction magazine launched in March 1952
