= Otfrid von Hanstein =

German actor and writer (1869–1959)

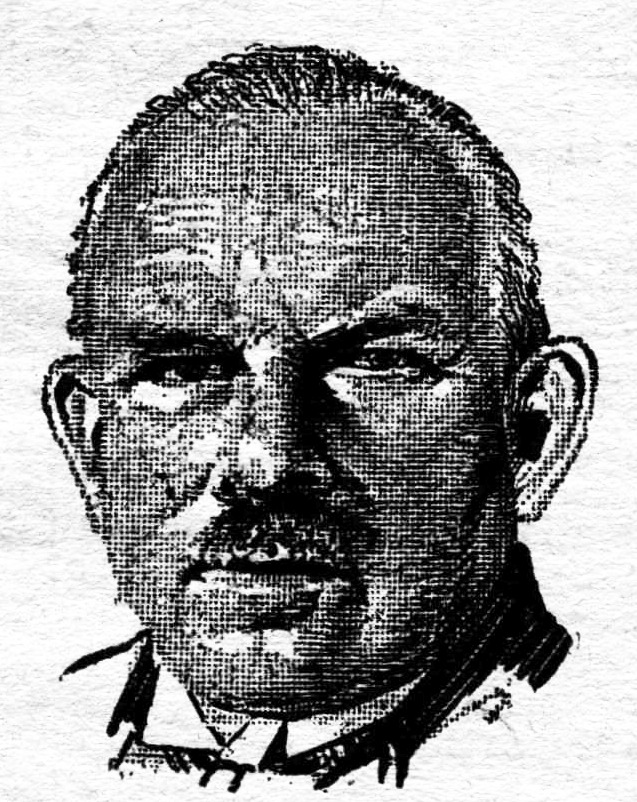
Otfrid von Hanstein, as pictured in Wonder Stories Quarterly, 1930

Otfrid von Hanstein (1869–1959) was a German actor and writer. As a novelist, he was prolific in various genres; his best-known works in English-language translation are science fiction novels published in various magazines by Hugo Gernsback. John Clute describes von Hanstein's science fiction as "technophilic and space-oriented, crude but competent". E. F. Bleiler reports that his SF novels were suppressed by the Nazi government.

== Translated works ==
- The Hidden Colony (1924 as Die Farm des Verschollenen, Wonder Stories, January–March 1935, tr. Fletcher Pratt). Clute classifies the novel as Utopian; E. F. Bleiler noted von Hanstein's focus on "technology as a way of improving efficiency and life" and wrote that "The frame situation is somewhat confusing, and the characterizations are weak, but the technology is at times fascinating. Like Hanstein's other stories, stodgy, but readable". He also commented that "a closer reading reveals considerable ambivalence in Hanstein's vision.
- Utopia Island (1927 as Ein Flug um die Welt und die Insel der seltsam Dinge, Wonder Stories, May–June 1931, tr. Francis M. Currier). Clute characterizes the novel as "another ambivalently-described Utopia"; Bleiler writes that "The author is obviously fascinated by his technology, which he describes well. The plot line, as might be seen from the conspiracy, is on the naive side. Hanstein displays a little nationalism, but his science of peace is international". He also notes that the identification of the German-language original has been questioned, but that no plausible alternative has been identified.
- Electropolis (1928, Wonder Stories Quarterly, Summer 1930, tr. Francis M. Currier). Clute classifies the novel as Utopian; Bleiler described it as "competent work, but with no special appeal. Even so, certainly superior to most of the other longer works in pulp science-fiction of the day". He also noted that Electropolis was "Negligible as fiction, but interesting for its extreme faith in technology and technocracy."

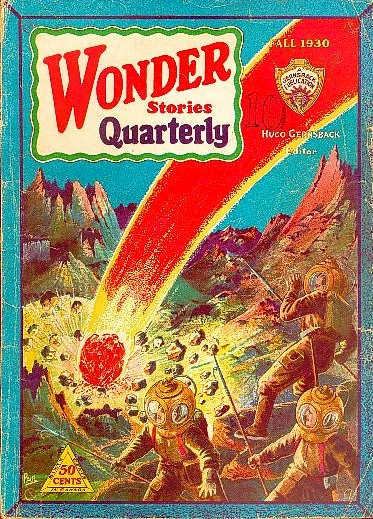
Frank R. Paul's cover illustration for Between Earth And Moon

- Between Earth And Moon (1929 as Mond-Rak 1. Eine Fahrt ins Weltall, Wonder Stories Quarterly, Fall 1930, tr. Francis M. Currier). Bleiler compares this near-future novel of the early stages of space exploration unfavorably to the similar work of Otto Willi Gail, saying "The development is fairly realistic, based on German rocket research of the time, but not as valid as Gail's comparable work". He finds the novel "On the dull side, although in context, back in 1928, it was probably more exciting". Amazing Stories reviewer C. A. Brandt wrote that "The book is convincingly written, the illustrations [in the German first edition] are good, and the lover of scientific fiction will find a veritable mine of proven and possible inventions, which will stimulate the imagination and provide good entertainment."
- In the Year 8000 (1932, no published German-language original, Wonder Stories, July–September 1932, tr. Laurence Manning & Konrad Schmidt). Gernsback claimed that In the Year 8000 "was written exclusively for Wonder Stories", in response to American readers' enthusiasm for Utopia Island. Clute classified the story as dystopian. Bleiler found it "Much less pleasant than the other Hanstein stories, with some elements of early racism", as well as derivative of Thea von Harbou's Metropolis. He places the novel in the "sentimental stages of German Expressionism", and comments that "By now Hanstein has moved away from unrestrained enthusiasm for technology, and is working toward humane controls. As in Hanstein's other work, the background detail is more important than the plot or characterizations, which are clichéd."
