= Jacques Goimard =

French writer (1934–2012)

Jacques Goimard (May 31, 1934, in La Couronne, France – October 25, 2012) was a French writer of science fiction and fantasy anthologies. He was also an essayist.

He taught at Henri-IV, a secondary school, before teaching history and cinema as well as running a literary seminar at the University of Paris I and the University of Paris VII.

Goimard wrote several anthologies, essays, and novels. He also wrote several movie reviews, and his writing appeared in the magazines Fiction and Métal Hurlant and in the newspaper Le Monde.
