= ElizaBeth Gilligan =

American novelist

Elizabeth Gilligan
- Born: August 16, 1962; Fort Benning, Georgia, U.S.
- Died: October 9, 2017 (aged 55); Newark, California, U.S.
- Education: Kent State University
- Occupation: Author
- Spouse: Douglas Archer Gilligan
- Children: 2
- Writing career
- Genre: Fantasy

ElizaBeth Ann Gilligan (August 16, 1962 – October 9, 2017) was an American fantasy author who lived in San Francisco, California.

== Biography ==
Gilligan was born in Fort Benning, Georgia, and was raised and lived in the San Francisco Bay Area. She studied journalism at Kent State University.

Gilligan published articles, essays and poetry. Her short story Iron Joan was a preliminary ballot nominee for the 2002 Nebula Award in the category of Best Short Story. Gilligan served as the secretary for the Science Fiction Writers of America (SFWA) board of directors from 2002 to 2003, and she frequently attended OryCon and BayCon.

Gilligan died from cancer on October 9, 2017, aged 55, in her sleep at her home in Newark, California. She was survived by her husband, Douglas Archer Gilligan, two children, and two grandchildren.

== Bibliography ==
=== Short works ===
- Taking Back the Night (1994)
- Demon Calling (2000)
- Iron Joan (2002, published in Black Gate: Adventures in Fantasy Literature)
- Chasing Time (2003)
- Brownie Points (2004)
- Off Key (2004)
- Tete-tete (2015)

=== Novels ===
- Magic's Silken Snare (2003, Daw Books; ISBN 0-7564-0127-5)
- The Silken Shroud (2004, DAW Books; ISBN 0-7564-0179-8)
- Sovereign Silk (2017, DAW Books; ISBN 978-0756402587)

=== Anthologies ===
Gilligan's works have appeared in the following anthologies.

- Witch Fantastic (1994, Daw Books, ISBN 0-88677-640-6)
- Sword And Sorceress XVII (2000, Daw Books, ISBN 0-88677-891-3)
- The Sorcerer's Academy (2003, Daw Books, ISBN 0-7564-0157-7)
- Little Red Riding Hood in the Big Bad City (2004, Daw Books, ISBN 0-7564-0233-6)
- The Magic Shop (2004, Daw Books, ISBN 0-7564-0173-9)
- First Contact Cafe (2015, SkyWarrior Publications)

Anthologies edited by Gilligan.

- Alterna-Teas (2017, Createspace Independent Publishing Platform, ISBN 9781520478395
