= 1938 in science fiction =

The year 1938 was marked, in science fiction, by the following events.

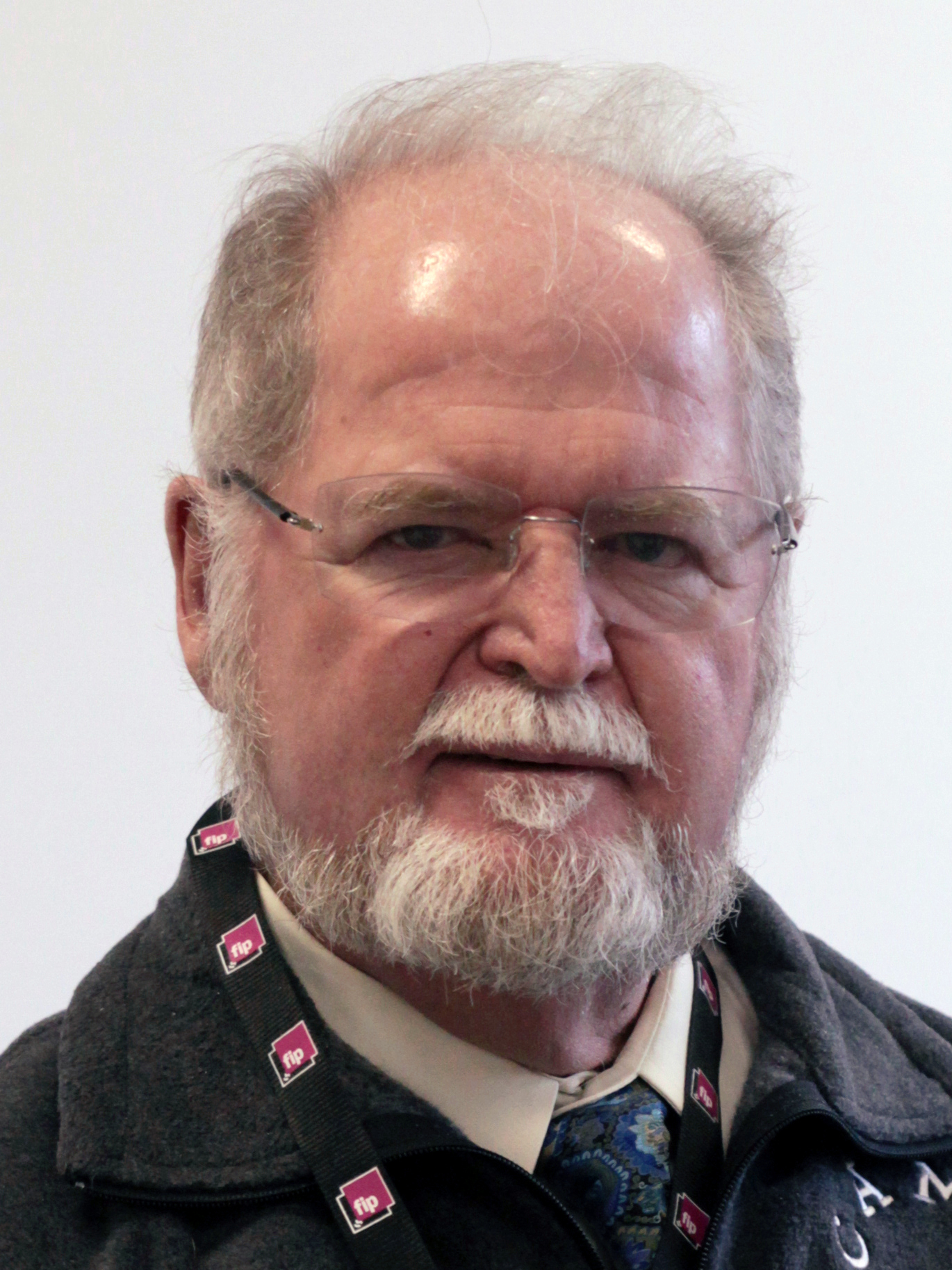
Larry Niven

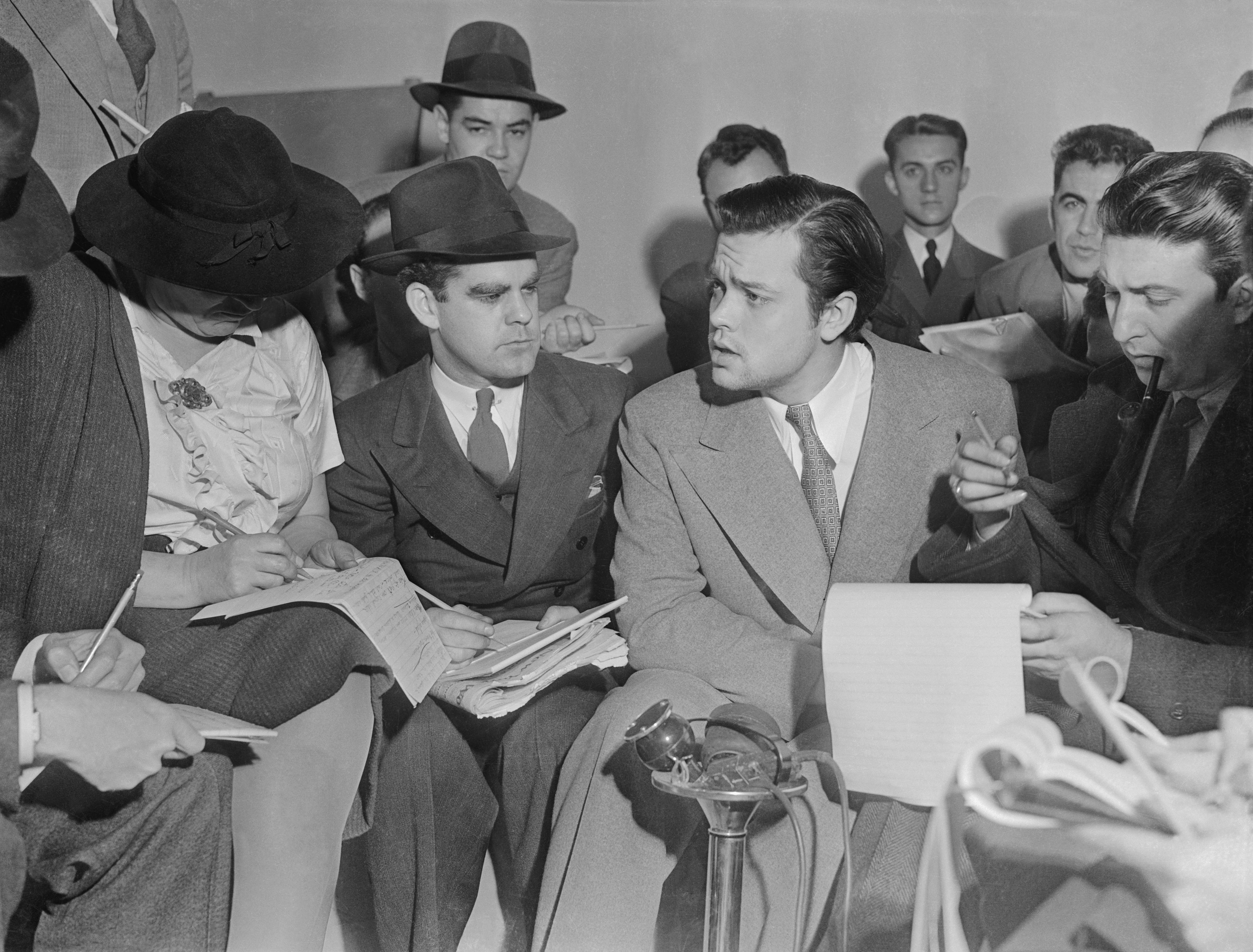
Orson Welles tells reporters that no one connected with the broadcast had any idea that it would cause panic (October 31, 1938).

== Births and deaths ==
=== Births ===
- Jean Giraud, a.k.a. Moebius (d. 2012)
- Michael Kurland
- Justin Leiber (d. 2016)
- Larry Niven. His best-known work is Ringworld (1970)
- Paul van Herck (d. 1989)
- Ted White
- M. K. Wren (d. 2016)
- Janusz A. Zajdel (d. 1985)

=== Deaths ===
- Karel Čapek (b. 1890)
- Frigyes Karinthy (b. 1887)

== Events ==
- October 30 - The War of the Worlds, radio drama directed and narrated by actor and future filmmaker Orson Welles as an adaptation of H. G. Wells's novel The War of the Worlds (1898). The episode became famous for allegedly causing panic among its listening audience, though the scale of that panic is disputed, as the program had relatively few listeners.

== Literary releases ==
=== Novels ===
- For Us, The Living: A Comedy of Customs by Robert A. Heinlein
- Galactic Patrol by E. E. Smith
- Out of the Silent Planet by C. S. Lewis

=== Short stories ===
- "Azathoth" by H. P. Lovecraft
- "The Command" by L. Sprague de Camp
- "Helen O'Loy" by Lester del Rey
- "Hollerbochen's Dilemma" by Ray Bradbury
- "How We Went to Mars" by Arthur C. Clarke
- "Hyperpilosity" by L. Sprague de Camp
- "The Men and the Mirror" by Ross Rocklynne
- "The Merman" by L. Sprague de Camp
- "Rule 18" by Clifford D. Simak
- "Tidal Moon" by Stanley G. Weinbaum and Helen Weinbaum
- Who Goes There?, novella by John W. Campbell, Jr.

== Movies ==
Title	Director	Release	Primary cast	Production country	Notes	Ref(s)
Flash Gordon's Trip to Mars	Ford Beebe, Robert F. Hill	31 March 1938	Larry "Buster" Crabbe, Jean Rogers, Charles B. Middleton	United States	Film serial with 15 chapters	
Flight to Fame	C. C. Coleman Jr.	12 October 1938	Charles Farrell, Jacqueline Wells, Hugh Sothern	United States		

== Awards ==
The main science-fiction awards known at the present time did not exist at this time.

== See also ==
- 1938 in science

== Sources ==
- Hardy, Phil, ed. (1984). Science Fiction. New York : Morrow. ISBN 0-688-00842-9.
- Kinnard, Roy; Crnkovich, Tony; Vitone, R. J. (2008). The Flash Gordon Serials, 1936–1940. McFarland. ISBN 978-0786455003.
