= The Secret of the Martian Moons =

1955 novel by Donald A. Wollheim

- Author: Donald A. Wollheim
- Cover artist: Alex Schomburg
- Language: English
- Genre: science-fiction novel
- Published: 1955 (John C. Winston Co.)
- Publication place: United States of America
- Media type: Print (Hardcover)
- Pages: 206 (Hardcover edition)
- OCLC: N/A

The Secret of the Martian Moons is a science-fiction novel by Donald A. Wollheim. It was first published in 1955 by the John C. Winston Company. This is the second novel that Wollheim wrote for Winston, the other two being The Secret of Saturn's Rings (1954) and The Secret of the Ninth Planet (1959).

This is also one of the thirty-five juvenile novels that comprise the Winston Science Fiction set, which novels were published in the 1950s for a readership of teen-aged boys. The typical protagonist in these books was a boy in his late teens who was proficient in the art of electronics, a hobby that was easily available to the readers.

== Plot ==
Returning to Mars from a four-year stay on Earth, sixteen-year-old Nelson Parr feels anger toward all the talk he hears about the possibility of the Earth authorities shutting down the Martian colony and bringing all of the colonists back to Earth. For a century the colonists had tried to make a living on Mars and, more importantly, to unlock the secrets of the abandoned cities that they found on the planet and now some people just wanted to give up. He’s distracted from his anger when he’s attacked by an intruder in his sleep cubicle. The assailant gets away but leaves behind, on the mirror over the wash basin, the evaporating print of a three-fingered hand. Nelson assumes that the burglar was looking for the letter that Leroy Perrault, a scientist with the Interplanetary Bureau, had given to him to pass on to his father, John Carson Parr.

After arriving on Mars Nelson learns from his father that the planet is indeed being abandoned and over the next few days the remaining three hundred colonists are put on ships and sent to Earth. But Nelson, his father, his father’s assistant (Jim Worden), and three other men secretly stay behind. Perrault’s letter has authorized this clandestine group because certain anomalous events noticed over the previous century indicate that the Martians are still present, hiding in their impenetrably sealed cities. To catch out the hidden Martians the six men ride a small rocketship to Phobos, the larger and innermore of Mars’s moons, and set up camp with their telescopes.

Weeks go by, but then Nelson sees a light in one of the cities. Over the following days the men see more signs of activity in the city and one day they see a collection of crates lying in a plaza. To keep a longer watch on the crates Nelson and Jim take their rocketship’s lifeboat to Deimos and set up the spare telescope some distance from their landing site. Jim goes back to the lifeboat to get the telescope’s other lens and when he doesn’t come back after some time Nelson goes to see what’s taking him so long. He finds that Jim has been murdered: someone bashed in the back of Jim’s helmet to let the air out of his spacesuit and then sabotaged the lifeboat and its radio.

Trying to spot the murderers while at the same time evading them, Nelson crosses the surface of Deimos in long, gliding bounds, hoping, in some desperation, to find the killers’ spaceship and somehow take it. Feeling that he’s being followed, he hides in a small, narrow canyon and, believing he’s under active pursuit, goes to its dead end and takes refuge in a cave that ends at a door. He hides in a side tunnel and watches five humanoid aliens come to the door, open it, and pass through. A few minutes later he goes through the door, through the airlock beyond, and into a large alien base under the surface of Deimos.

As he’s exploring the base he’s confronted by one of the three-fingered aliens, who introduces himself as Kunosh, the leader of the Deimosians. Hearing of Jim Worden’s murder, the timid Kunosh enlists Nelson’s help in ridding Deimos of certain bad men who, Kunosh assures Nelson, killed his friend. In the control room of the hollow moon Nelson knocks out the five aliens who he believes killed Jim, enabling Kunosh’s people to tie them up. Then he finds out that the five came from Phobos, where his father and three other men are at risk.

In response to Nelson’s demand and the taunts of one of the Phobosians, Kunosh tells Nelson that his people, both Deimosians and Phobosians, are not Martians. These aliens had originated on a planet revolving around the star Vega, where they had evolved a perfect society with a perfect culture. They want nothing to do with alien cultures, which they regard as absolutely inferior to theirs. But then they learned that the Marauders, an immense horde of interstellar pirates in a vast armada of huge, black ships, were headed their way. They responded by building two giant, spherical spaceships, loading their entire population into them, and fleeing into interstellar space for a three thousand-year journey to Sol, where they arrived and went into orbit around Mars sometime in the 1600s.

Suddenly realizing that the Phobosian spaceship must still be available, Nelson coerces Kunosh into taking him to it. They arrive in the hangar just in time to see the five Phobosians that Nelson helped capture boarding the craft and leaving Deimos in it. Returning to the Deimos control room, Nelson is put into television contact with the Phobos control room and the leaders there. The Phobosian leader demands that the Deimosians capture Nelson so that his men can pick him up and bring him to Phobos, where the Deimosians cannot secretly murder him as they did Jim Worden. Before the Deimosians can act panic breaks out – the lead elements of the Marauder fleet have been detected crossing the orbit of Pluto.

In the panic Nelson drags Kunosh back to the spaceship hangar and compels him to explain the controls of a cube-shaped vehicle. Once alone he lifts the ship off Deimos, which has thrust itself out of its orbit to head into interstellar space, where it will never be found. Phobos has also left its orbit and is headed toward Earth. Trying to keep up, Nelson is captured by the Marauders.

It turns out that the Marauders are the Martians, descendants of people taken from Earth to Mars half a million years ago by unknown visitors from the stars. Having learned the technology and techniques of interstellar flight, they tell Nelson, they pack up their entire population every ten generations or so, seal their cities, and take off on a millennia-long interstellar road trip. They have just returned from their latest adventure and find that they must now prevent a war with Earth. A single fast cruiser takes Nelson to Earth, lands at the Capitol, and Nelson and the Martian representatives convince Earth authorities that peace is best.

== Publication history ==
- 1955, USA, John C. Winston Co., Hardback (xi + 206 pp)
- 1955, Denmark, Winthers Forlag, Rumfart-Serien #7, Paperback, as Mysteriet på Mars (The Mystery on Mars)
- 1957, Germany, Erich Pabel Verlag (Rastatt, Germany), Utopia-Kriminal #21, Paperback, as Das Marsrätsel (The Mars Mystery)
- 1958, Sweden, Wennerberg, Rymd-böckerna #7, Paperback (160 pp), as Marsianernas Gåta (The Martians’ Riddle)
- 1960, France, Daniber, L’Alouette #7, 1960 Jan 01, Hardback (189 pp), as Le Mystère des Lunes de Mars (The Mystery of the Moons of Mars)
- 1963, USA, Tempo Books, Mar 1963, Paperback (191 pp)
- 1965, USA, Tempo Books/Grosset & Dunlap, Dec 1965, Paperback (191 pp)

== Listings ==
The book is listed at

- The Library of Congress as http://lccn.loc.gov/55005741
- The British Library as UIN = BLL01003965635
