= 1924 in science fiction =

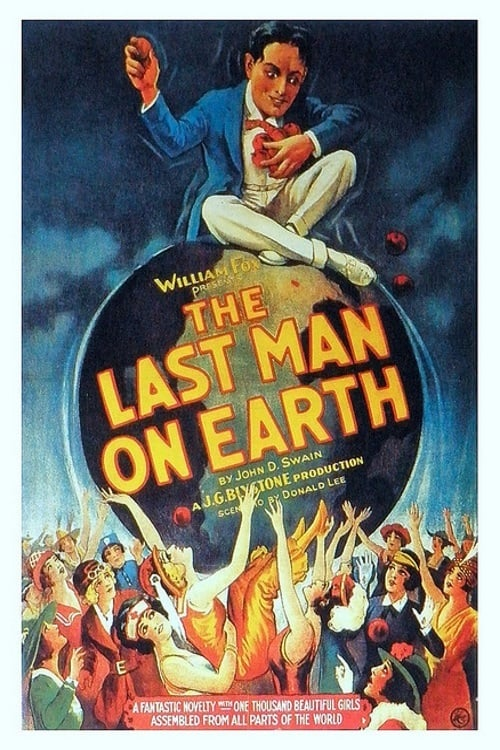
The Last Man on Earth (1924).

The year 1924 was marked, in science fiction, by the following events.

== Births and deaths ==
=== Births ===
- June 6 : Robert Abernathy, American writer (died 1990)
- July 20 : Thomas Berger, American writer (died 2014)
- André Caroff, French writer (died 2009)

== Literary releases ==
=== Novels ===
- Berge Meere und Giganten, by Alfred Döblin.
- The City of Light, a novel by Mieczysław Smolarski in genres of dystopia and catastrophism. The novel's themes include antimilitarism and pacifism, prevalent after World War I.

=== Short stories ===
- (in French) Deux mille ans sous la mer, by (in French) Léon Groc.

== Movies ==
- Aelita, by Yakov Protazanov.

== See also ==
- 1924 in science
- 1923 in science fiction
- 1925 in science fiction
