= Lino Aldani =

Italian science fiction writer

Lino Aldani (29 March 1926 – 31 January 2009) was an Italian science fiction writer.

== Biography ==
Aldani was born in San Cipriano Po in 1926. He lived in Rome, where he worked as a mathematics teacher until 1968, when he returned to his native San Cipriano Po and devoted his life to writing.

He published science fiction stories starting in the 1960s (his first published short story being "Dove sono i vostri Kumar?", in 1960) and published his first novel, Quando le radici, in 1977. In 1962 he wrote the first Italian critical essay about science fiction, La fantascienza. In 1963 Aldani founded the SF magazine Futuro with Massimo Lo Jacono; the magazine lasted eight issues.

His works have been translated into several languages. He died in Pavia on 31 January 2009.

== Bibliography ==
- La Fantascienza (1963), essay;
- Aleph 3 (1963), his first novel, first published in 2007;
- Quarta Dimensione (1964);
- Quando le radici (1977), a novel whose main character, Arno, looks for his past in a future, disturbing Italy;
- Eclissi 2000 (1979), a novel about the impossibility of creating a government without resorting to lies and deceit;
- Nel segno della luna bianca (1980; also known as Febbre di luna, with Daniela Piegai), a left-wing inspired fantasy novel;
- La croce di ghiaccio (1989), novel;
- Aria di Roma andalusa (2003), collection of stories;
- Febbre di luna (2004), collection of stories;
- Themoro Korik (2007), a novel about Romani people.
