= 1922 in science fiction =

The year 1922 was marked, in science fiction, by the following events.

== Births and deaths ==
=== Births ===
- April 16: John Christopher, British writer (died 2012)
- May 24: Gokulananda Mahapatra, Indian writer (died 2013)
- May 30: Hal Clement, American writer (died 2003)
- September 19: Damon Knight, American writer (died 2002)
- November 11: Kurt Vonnegut, American writer (died 2007)
- December 28: Stan Lee, American comic book writer and editor (died 2018)
- Bob Leman, American writer (died 2006)

== Awards ==
The main science-fiction Awards known at the present time did not exist at this time.

== Audiovisual outputs ==
=== Movies ===
- Dr. Mabuse the Gambler, by Fritz Lang.

== See also ==
- 1922 in science
- 1921 in science fiction
- 1923 in science fiction
