= Gokulananda Mahapatra =

Indian writer and scientist

- Born: 24 May 1922; Bhadrak, Odisha, India
- Died: 10 July 2013 (aged 91); Ahmedabad, Gujarat, India
- Education: MSc, Phd
- Alma mater: University of Calcutta, Utkal University
- Occupation: Scientist
- Spouse: Kumudini Mohapatra
- Children: Jyotshna Mahapatra, Girija Mahapatra, Rashmi Mohanty, Snigdha Patnaik, Nanda Nandan Mahapatra
- Writing career
- Language: Odia
- Genre: Science fiction
- Notable awards: Kalinga Samman (2011)
- Website: gnmfoundation.org/PresidentsPage.html

Gokulananda Mahapatra (24 May 1922 – 10 July 2013) was an Indian scientist and science fiction writer, who popularized science in the Odia language. Mahapatra has authored over 95 science fiction and children science books. Some of his notable contributions are Krutrima Upagraha, Prithibi bahare Manisha, Chandra ra Mrutyu, Nishabda Godhuli, Madam Curie and Nila Chakra Bala Sapare. He was the founding member of Orissa Bigyana Prachar Samhiti with the objective of making science popular in the state of Orissa. He received Orissa Sahitya Akademy Award for his book E juga ra sreshtha abiskara.

== Early life and career ==
Mahapatra was born in Bhadrak, Odisha. He went on to do MSc from the University of Calcutta and was honored with PhD from the Utkal University. He also pursued FIC (Fellow in Chemistry) degree at Brandeis University (Boston, MA). He retired as the Head of the Department of Ravenshaw University.

== Honours and awards ==
Mahapatra was awarded the Kalinga Samman in 2011, the Orissa Sahitya Akademy Award in 1986, and R K Parija Samman Saala Samman for his contribution to science literature in Odia.

== Publications ==
=== Science fiction ===
- Pruthibi bahare manisha
- Krutrima Upagraha
- Chandrara Mrutyu
- Nishabda Godhuli
- Sunara Odisha
- Mrutyu eka matrutwa ra
- Nishchala pruthibi
- Mrutyu rashmi

=== Stories ===
- Udanta thalia
- Chaturtha parisara
- Bigyana bichitra
- Bigyanara srestha abiskara
- E jugara srestha abiskara
