= The Other Side of Here =

1936 novel by Murray Leinster

- Cover of the first edition
- Author: Murray Leinster
- Illustrator: Stanley Meltzoff
- Language: English
- Genre: Science fiction
- Publisher: Ace Books
- Publication date: 1955
- Publication place: United States
- Media type: Print (Paperback)
- Pages: 134
- OCLC: 1943211

The Other Side of Here is a science fiction novel by American writer Murray Leinster, first published as a five-part Astounding Stories serial in 1936, under the title "The Incredible Invasion". It was first published in book form, in a "thorough revision", as one side of an Ace Double, in 1955. While no further American editions have been issued, the novel has been translated into Italian (L'altra dimensione, 1955), Spanish (Ataque desde la Cuarta Dimensión, 1956), French (L'autre côté du monde, 1958) and German (Invasion aus einer anderen Welt, 1959). The novels tells the story of "an invasion from the fourth dimension", foiled by an insurrection against the invaders' home government.

== Reception ==
Groff Conklin praised Other Side on its 1956 publication, as "a vivid, galloping melodrama based on his favorite theme of alternate worlds". P. Schuyler Miller's review was more tepid, saying "It would have been great stuff twenty years ago; it's merely smooth stuff now." Anthony Boucher dismissed the novel as "for completists only".

E. F. Bleiler wrote that the novel, in its original form as The Incredible Invasion, was "Good in [the] beginning, but the perpetual chase and backtracking lose conviction after a time. The characterizations are not as strong as is usual with Leinster. . . All in all, not worth reading except as a period piece. Academic critic David Seed praised Leinster for "cleverly the ambiguous role of the media in selectively reporting the news and also in juggling the popular interpretations of the invasion".
