= Kumudini Mohapatra =

- Born: 1930; Odisha
- Died: 2006 (aged 75–76)
- Occupation: Author
- Spouse: Gokulananda Mahapatra
- Writing career
- Language: Odia
- Genre: Science fiction

Kumudini Mohapatra (1930–2006) was an Odia-language Indian author and translator from the state of Odisha. Her travelogue Americara Ghara O Gharani and science fiction Chandra Abhimukhe Abhijaan are a few of her popular works. Mohapatra was married to Gokulananda Mahapatra. She was active in Science-writing during 1947–1948.

== Early life ==
Mohapatra was married to Gokulananda Mahapatra. The couple had five children; Jyotshna, Girija, Rashmi, Snigdha, and Nanda Nandan.
