= Forgotten Futures =

1993 role-playing game

- Cover
- Designers: Marcus L. Rowland
- Publishers: Heliograph Inc. (in print), author (CD-ROM and web site)
- Publication: 1993, revised 1998,2005
- Genres: Victorian / Edwardian science fiction and fantasy
- Systems: Custom

Forgotten Futures is a role-playing game created by Marcus Rowland to allow people to play in settings inspired by Victorian and Edwardian science fiction and fantasy (i.e., steampunk). Most of its releases begin with these stories then add background material to explain the settings (often as alternate worlds, whose history diverges from our own), adventures, and other game material.

== Game system ==
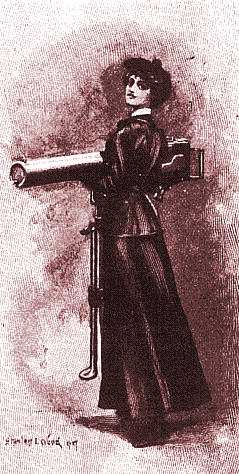
Image by Stanley L. Wood often used in Forgotten Futures advertising

The base system uses three characteristics (Body, Mind, and Soul) and a range of skills; points are used to purchase characteristics and skills based on one or more of the characteristics. Skills and characteristics are used by opposing them to a target (such as a difficulty number, an opponent's skill or characteristics, etc.) using a 2D6 dice roll. Subsequent revisions to the rules add options including a Magic characteristic, melodramatic character traits, and other complications, but the core system remains unchanged.

Rowland is believed to have pioneered the concept of shareware tabletop role-playing games with this system, although there were earlier shareware computer games with role-playing elements. Users can download the rules from his web site, buy a subscription that entitles them to Forgotten Futures CDs, or buy a copy of the published version of this game. The CDs are also good sources for science fiction books and other period material whose copyright has expired. A proportion of his income from the game is donated to cancer research charities.

Currently several versions of the rules are on line (complete and summary versions in HTML and PDF, and a German translation in PDF), along with a sample adventure set in a Victorian Channel Tunnel, plus eleven game collections (source material plus background worldbook, adventures, etc.), with an expanding collection of additional resources on line and on the CD-ROM. The rules and sample adventure have twice been published in print; in brief form as a booklet given away with Arcane Magazine in 1997, and at full length by Heliograph Inc. in 1999.

In May 2016 Rowland announced that due to delays in the next release and changes in European tax law he would end shareware distribution of the game. Instead he intends to put all of the existing material on line, including the full contents of the CD, with a tip jar for voluntary contributions, and hopes to add more material. Users with current shareware registrations were offered a partial refund or the option to donate it to Cancer Research UK.

== Versions ==
Forgotten Futures I: The A.B.C. Files
Set in Kipling's 21st century airship utopia. Contains the text of "With the Night Mail" and "As Easy as ABC", a worldbook, an adventure, a spreadsheet of airship data, and numerous illustrations. This was the first and by far the smallest of these collections, since at that time the game was distributed on 720k disks; subsequent releases were on 1.44mb disks then CD-ROM.
Forgotten Futures II: The Log of the Astronef
A comprehensive guide to the exploration of the Solar System in 1900 AD. Based on George Griffith's Stories of Other Worlds, it contains six stories, the illustrations from their original publication, a worldbook taking the story forward to 1920, a spaceship design spreadsheet, five adventures, plus the novelisation A Honeymoon in Space. The fiction and worldbook were briefly available in print from Heliograph Inc.
Forgotten Futures III: George E. Challenger's Mysterious World
Adventures with Sir Arthur Conan Doyle's scientific hero, including the full text of The Lost World, "The Poison Belt", "When the World Screamed", The Land of Mist, "The Horror of the Heights", and "The Disintegration Machine", a worldbook, four adventures, and a wargames scenario.
Forgotten Futures IV: The Carnacki Cylinders
Horror and the supernatural in Edwardian England, including the original text and illustrations for William Hope Hodgson's Carnacki, the Ghost-Finder, a worldbook with rules for magic and the Ab-natural, three adventures and two long outlines, a story-telling card game, etc. Re-released as PDFs with additional material December 2022.
Forgotten Futures V: Goodbye Piccadilly…
The destruction of London, as seen by a variety of authors around the end of the 19th century. Contents include two long adventures, numerous adventure outlines, ten stories and articles, etc.
Forgotten Futures VI: Victorian Villainy
A source collection for melodramatic adventures, including three plays, the novel A Bid for Fortune by Guy Boothby, some of E.W. Hornung's Raffles stories, and more.
Forgotten Futures VII: Tsar Wars
Based on the late 19th-century novels of George Griffith, Tsar Wars is a setting for the struggle between the anarchist Terror and the forces of oppression in the early 20th century, and the return of the Tsar's heir to the utopia of 2030 AD. The novels were briefly in print from Heliograph Inc.
Forgotten Futures VIII: Fables and Frolics
Based on the fantasies of E. Nesbit, FF8 is a role-playing game set in a world of childhood magical adventures. Includes three novels, 23 short stories and some autobiographical articles by Nesbit, also rules for magic, life as a Victorian/Edwardian child, adventures, etc.
Forgotten Futures IX: It's My Own Invention
Adventures in the worlds of weird science and engineering. Includes two novels by George Griffith, articles and stories by several authors, and game worlds based on flight (and a war on the supernatural), automata and calculating engines, space travel, and time travel.
Forgotten Futures X: The Tooth and Claw Role Playing Game
A licensed RPG based on the novel Tooth and Claw by Jo Walton, set in a world with Victorian-equivalent technology which has a separate dragon nation. Player characters are dragons. The game is published in PDF and HTML versions, and is illustrated by Sue Mason and the author. It includes background material, revised rules catering for dragon characters, two adventures, and adventure outlines.
The Forgotten Futures Compendium
Two long adventures, Curse of the Leopardmen by Alex Stewart and The League of Extraordinary Geometers (a crossover with The Original Flatland RPG) by Marcus Rowland, plus adventure outlines based on Victorian and Edwardian advertising by Marcus Rowland. PDF only.
Forgotten Futures XI: Planets of Peril
A 1930s pulp SF setting based on the stories of Stanley Weinbaum, sent to registered users on November 20, 2010, on line from December 20, 2010. Published in PDF and HTML versions and including most of Weinbaum's SF, three long adventures, and details of the worlds and technology of the setting.
In Preparation - Forgotten Futures XII: Empire of Earth
Announced with the release of FF XI, FF XII will be a setting based on Victorian stories of interplanetary and interstellar travel and warfare, primarily "The Struggle for Empire" by Robert W. Cole.
The Original Flatland Role Playing Game
Originally published in 1998 as an 'extra' on the Forgotten Futures CD-ROM, and relaunched as a stand-alone PDF with additional material in 2006, this game uses a streamlined version of the Forgotten Futures rules adapted to the setting of Edwin A. Abbott's Flatland. Characters are living 2D shapes such as triangles and hexagons. The game includes rules, three adventures and four adventure outlines, a wargame by Matthew Hartley, a long section on the 'science' of Flatland which attempts to explain aspects of the world and its natives, and the original book. It is sold as a charity project in aid of Médecins Sans Frontières (Doctors Without Borders).

== Reception ==
In the November 1994 edition of Pyramid (Issue #10), Ken and Jo Walton liked both the content of Forgotten Futures 2 and the shareware concept, saying, "This is an excellent, atmospheric, roleplaying game, made slightly unapproachable by its unusual distribution method. It is available only on disk; you unzip the file and print out the book for yourself. All text files are ASCII format, all pictures are GIFs."

In the March 1998 edition of Dragon (Issue 245), Allen Varney called Forgotten Futures "A very substantial and admirable shareware RPG from one of Britain's top designers, based on the British 'scientific romances' popular a century ago." Varney also complimented Marcus Rowland for trying to keep those old 'scientific romance' stories in circulation, saying, "Aside from the game's real virtues, this worthy mission makes Forgotten Futures a must for any fan of science fiction's early history."

== Reviews ==
- Pyramid - CD-ROM version

== See also ==
- Space 1889
- Steampunk
