= Professor Challenger =

Fictional character by Sir Arthur Conan Doyle

- The Lost World character
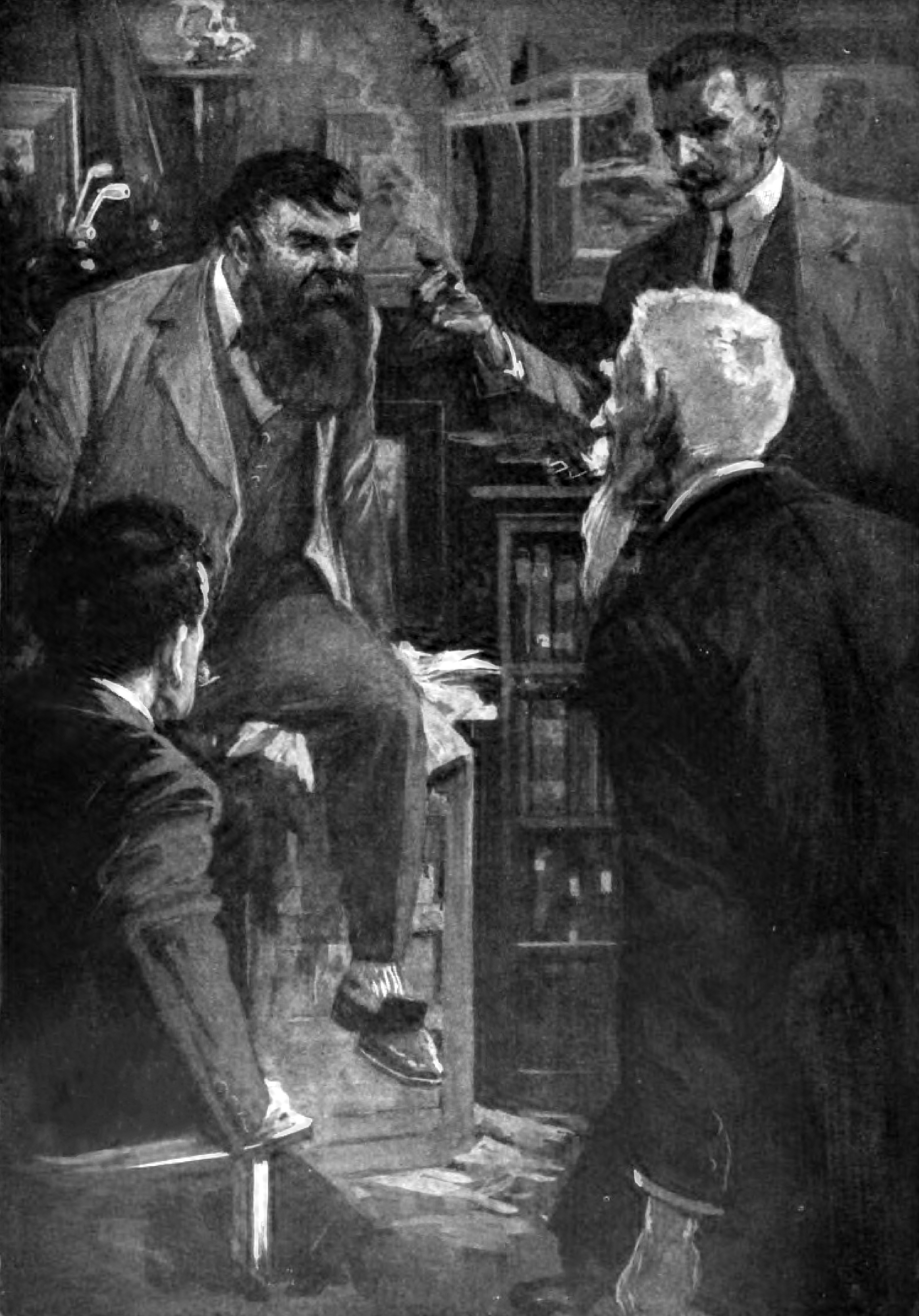
- Professor Challenger (seated) as illustrated by Harry Rountree in Arthur Conan Doyle's novella The Poison Belt in The Strand Magazine
- Created by: Arthur Conan Doyle
- Portrayed by: Wallace Beery; Claude Rains; John Rhys-Davies; Patrick Bergin; Peter McCauley; Bob Hoskins; Bruce Boxleitner; Martin W. Payne

In-universe information
- Gender: Male
- Nationality: Scottish

George Edward Challenger is a fictional character in a series of fantasy and science fiction stories by Sir Arthur Conan Doyle. Unlike Doyle's self-controlled, analytical character, Sherlock Holmes, Professor Challenger is an aggressive but virtuous figure.

Like Sherlock Holmes, Professor Challenger was based on a real person—in this case, two people: an explorer, Percy Fawcett, who was Doyle's friend; and a professor of physiology named William Rutherford, who had lectured at the University of Edinburgh while Conan Doyle studied medicine there.

Professor Challenger first appeared in the novel The Lost World (1912) by Arthur Conan Doyle.

== Fictional character biography ==
George Edward Challenger, FRS, MD, DSc, is born in Largs, Ayrshire in 1863 and educated at Largs Academy before studying at the University of Edinburgh. Dr Challenger is appointed to an assistant position at the British Museum in 1892 and is promoted within a year to assistant keeper in the Comparative Anthropology Department. He holds a professorship in Zoology and is elected President of the Zoological Institute in London. Several of his inventions are successfully applied in industry and bring him additional income.

Edward Malone, the narrator of The Lost World, the 1912 novel in which Challenger first appears, describes his first meeting with the character:

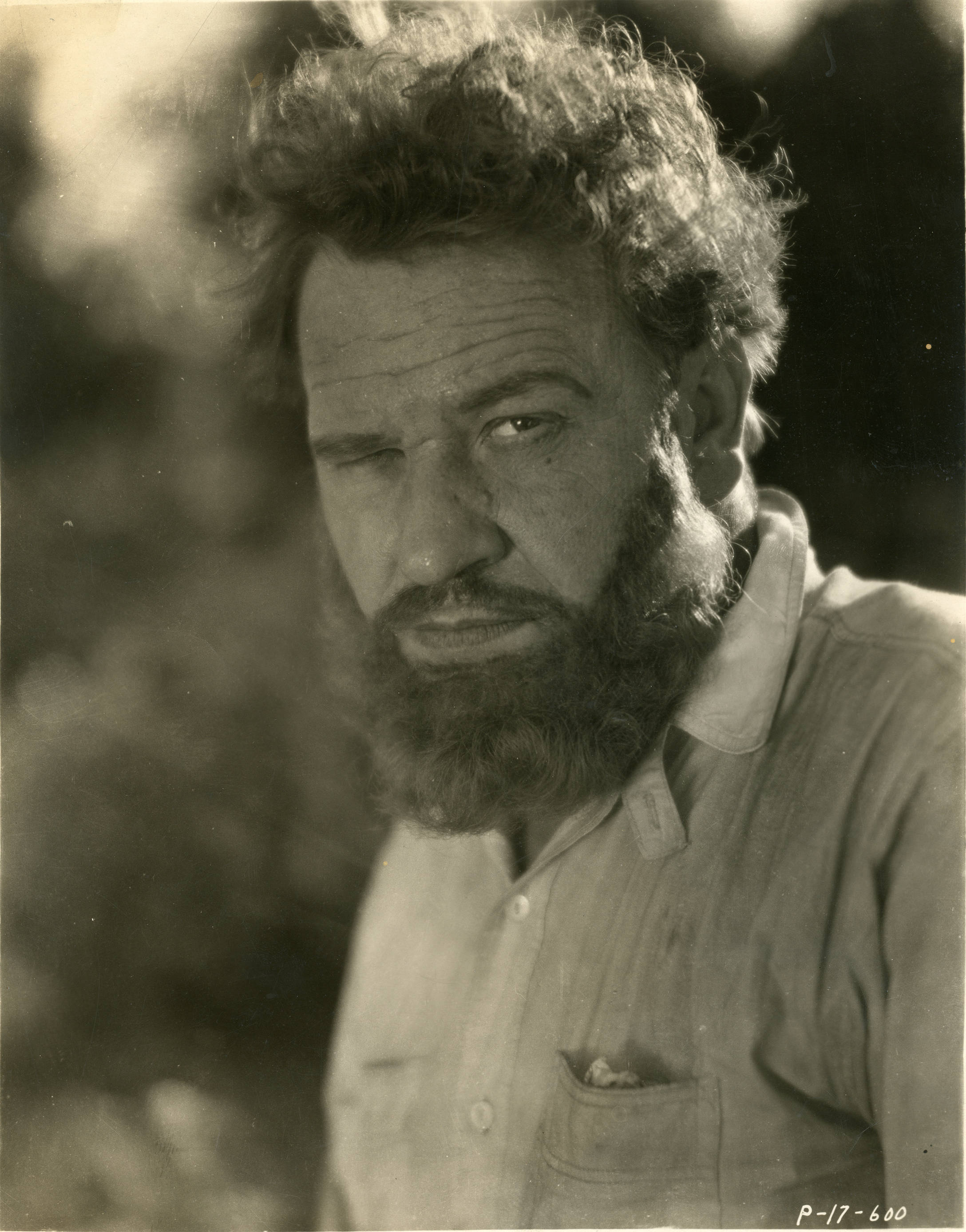
Wallace Beery as Challenger in the film version of The Lost World (1925)

His appearance made me gasp. I was prepared for something strange, but not for so overpowering a personality as this. It was his size, which took one's breath away – his size and his imposing presence. His head was enormous, the largest I have ever seen upon a human being. I am sure that his top hat, had I ventured to don it, would have slipped over me entirely and rested on my shoulders. He had the face and beard, which I associate with an Assyrian bull; the former florid, the latter so black as almost to have a suspicion of blue, spade-shaped and rippling down over his chest. The hair was peculiar, plastered down in front in a long, curving wisp over his massive forehead. The eyes were blue-grey under great black tufts, very clear, very critical, and very masterful. A huge spread of shoulders and a chest like a barrel were the other parts of him which appeared above the table, save for two enormous hands covered with long black hair. This and a bellowing, roaring, rumbling voice made up my first impression of the notorious Professor Challenger.

Challenger is a scientific jack-of-all-trades. Although considered by Malone's editor, Mr McArdle, to be "just a homicidal megalomaniac with a turn for science", his ingenuity can be counted upon to solve any problem or get out of any unsavoury situation; and be sure to offend and insult many people in the process. He is also seen as extremely vain by his colleagues: Edward Malone says that "he is convinced, of course, that he is destined for Westminster Abbey" (i.e. famous enough to be buried there), and later speculates that "in his fancy, may he see himself sometimes, gracing the vacant pedestal in Trafalgar Square". Challenger is, in many ways, rude, crude, and without social conscience or inhibition. Yet he is a man capable of great virtue and his love of his wife is all-encompassing.

Challenger marries Jessica—'Jessie'—and the couple settles at 14 Enmore Gardens, Enmore Park, Kensington, London. After his adventures in South America, Challenger and his wife purchase The Briars, in Rotherfield, Sussex, as a second home. Later, following his wife's death from influenza, Challenger sells his London home and rents an apartment on the third floor in Victoria West Gardens, London. Challenger's friend and biographer, the journalist Edward 'Ted' Dunn Malone, marries Enid Challenger, the Professor's daughter, in the summer of 1927. Malone was born in Ireland and achieved some fame in rugby football at international level for Ireland before a career in journalism at the Daily Gazette. Enid Challenger is a freelance reporter at the same newspaper.

In July 1908 Malone joins Challenger, the 66-year-old Mr Summerlee (c. 1842–1925), Professor of Comparative Anatomy, and the explorer and mountaineer Lord John Roxton, third son of the Duke of Pomfret and then in his mid-forties, on an expedition to the Amazon Basin, where Challenger claims to have observed creatures from prehistory two years previously. On reaching the mouth of the Amazon River in Pará state, the expedition hires local guides and servants Mojo, José, Fernando, Gomez, Manuel and Zambo. From Manaus the expedition continues up-river to reach an unnamed tributary, which they follow by canoe until by late August the explorers arrive in the Guiana Highlands and the great plateau that is the Lost World. The expedition camps at the foot of the basalt cliffs of the mountain, which they name Maple White Land in honour of the plateau's discoverer some four years earlier. The isolated plateau is home to numerous prehistoric animals, previously known only from the fossil record, including dinosaurs, pterosaurs, sauropterygians, Cenozoic megafauna, ichthyopterygians, and an early species of hominid. A group of indigenous people also occupy the plateau, and the explorers aid them to subjugate the predatory 'ape-men'. The expedition returns to London, bringing with them diamonds worth £200,000. Professors Challenger and Summerlee present their findings to the Zoological Institute on 7 November 1908 at the Queen's Hall, Regent Street, London. They claim to have discovered over 150 new species.

Three years later the friends re-assemble in Challenger’s Sussex home to witness The Poison Belt incident of 27 to 28 August 1911. Challenger interprets a shift in Fraunhofer's light diffraction lines to predict that the Earth is passing through a deadly interstellar cloud of ether. By breathing oxygen from cylinders brought to the house earlier, Challenger, his wife and friends avoid falling into catalepsy over the several hours the event lasted. It appears as though all animal life on the planet expired but within 28 hours all recovered.

Challenger is able to pursue his scientific interests independently as a result of a bequest by the rubber millionaire Betterton. He purchases an estate on Hengist Down near to his Sussex home and engages construction firm Morden & Company to begin sinking a vertical shaft to a depth of eight miles. In the spring of 1921 American specialist in artesian wells Mr Peerless Jones is engaged to plunge his drilling rod a further hundred feet into the apparently-living protoplasmic substance that was revealed at the bottom of the shaft. Challenger hopes through this experiment to prove that the Earth is a living organism that sustains its vitality from the ether of outer space. Preparations are ready by Tuesday 21 June 1921, and the drill breaches the tissue, producing a loud scream and unleashing a geyser of a protective tar-like secretion, accompanied by global volcanic activity. It is the day "When the World Screamed".

Some months later Challenger and Malone are the last people to meet the Latvian inventor Theodore Nemor, who claimed to have discovered the physics of disintegrating and then reassembling matter. Nemor apparently seeks competing bids from the British and Soviet governments to buy "The Disintegration Machine" at the time of his unexplained disappearance from London.

The death of Jessica Challenger affects her husband profoundly. Professor Challenger undertakes an investigation into psychic phenomena after Ted Malone and Enid Challenger's reports on spiritualism appear in the Daily Gazette in October 1926. Lord John Roxton, Malone, and the Reverend Charles Mason, a former Church of England exorcist who took up Spiritualism, visits a haunted house at Dryfont in Derbyshire. An apparition at the house convince the two friends of the reality of the spirit world and they set out to explore The Land of Mist further. Challenger joins the investigation ostensibly to demonstrate the fallacies of psychic research but becomes convinced of the reality of intercourse with the spirits of the dead and announces his conversion in a polemic carried by The Spectator magazine.

== Stories ==
=== By Arthur Conan Doyle ===
==== Novels ====
- 1912 – The Lost World, which describes an expedition to a plateau in South America where prehistoric creatures including dinosaurs, pterosaurs, and Pleistocene megafauna still survive.
- 1913 – The Poison Belt, in which the Earth passes through a cloud of poisonous ether.
- 1926 – The Land of Mist, a story of the supernatural, reflecting the strong belief in spiritualism which Conan Doyle developed later in life.

==== Short stories ====
- 1928 – "When the World Screamed", on Challenger's World Echinus theory.
- 1929 – "The Disintegration Machine", concerning the potentially dangerous new invention by a scientist named Theodore Nemor.

=== By other authors ===
- "The Footprints on the Ceiling": Jules Castier in his 1919 anthology of pastiches Rather Like. In the story, Edward Malone recounts how Sherlock Holmes was called upon to locate the vanished, seemingly kidnapped, Professor Challenger. The story also was reprinted in the anthology, The Misadventures of Sherlock Holmes (1944), edited by Ellery Queen.
- Sherlock Holmes's War of the Worlds: Manly Wade Wellman and Wade Wellman. A slightly anachronistic romp, in which Sherlock Holmes and Challenger oppose H. G. Wells' Martian hordes and one of Holmes' old enemies. Holmes is the hero, but Challenger plays a major part. It is mentioned that Challenger helped Holmes solve the case of the Giant Rat of Sumatra.
- Osamu Tezuka published a manga version of Sir Arthur Conan Doyle's The Lost World in 1948. Tezuka's manga is a complete re-imagining of the original story set on an alien planet.
- There have been several other comic adaptations of Professor Challenger's exploits, but none that were particularly widespread and well known. A descendant of Professor Challenger, named Darwin Challenger, is a minor character in Valiant's Turok: Dinosaur Hunter comics, first appearing in issue #7. He bears a strong resemblance to his ancestor and makes numerous references to events in the Lost World. Professor Challenger and his companions are also referenced in The League of Extraordinary Gentlemen series. According to writer Alan Moore, Challenger had a lifelong friendship with the zoologist Dr. Dolittle. Arguably the most notable appearance is the Dell Comics adaptation of the 1960 movie version of The Lost World, as an issue of their Four Color series.
- Return to the Lost World: Nicholas Nye. A sequel set a year later than The Lost World, which almost ignores the dinosaurs in favour of a plot involving parapsychology, an extremely odd version of evolutionary theory, and ancient technology in the style of Chariots of the Gods?. While Conan Doyle's Challenger is a foe of scientific fraud, this novel begins with him preparing a scientific fake.
- Challenger, alongside Nikola Tesla, plays a major role in two of Ralph Vaughan's four Sherlock Holmes/H. P. Lovecraft crossovers, The Adventure of the Dreaming Detective (1992) and Sherlock Holmes and the Terror Out of Time (2001).
- "Sherlock Holmes in the Lost World" (2008) by Martin Powell in anthology Gaslight Grimoire (reprinted in Sherlock Holmes: The Crossover Casebook), in which Challenger is lost in the Lost World again and rescued by Sherlock Holmes. Challenger has a daughter who is also "Professor Challenger".
- Dinosaur Summer: Greg Bear. Thirty years after Professor Challenger discovered dinosaurs in Venezuela, dinosaur circuses have become popular and are slipping out of the spotlight. The one remaining dinosaur circus makes a bold move to return their dinosaurs to the plateau. Challenger himself never appears, but the protagonist's son attended Challenger High School.
- Theaker, Stephen (2000). Professor Challenger in Space. Silver Age Books. ISBN 0-9537650-0-8. In this sequel Professor Summerlee, Lord Roxton and the narrator Malone accompany Challenger on a journey to the moon, in a desperate bid to save the people of Ell Ka-Mar, who have crowned Challenger their king.
- Challenger makes a guest appearance in the 3rd Plateau of Gilles Deleuze & Félix Guattari's post-structuralist philosophical text A Thousand Plateaus: Capitalism and Schizophrenia, in which he gives a lecture.
- The Gorilla Comics series Section Zero, written by Karl Kesel, featured a scientific genius named Titania "Doc" Challenger, implied to be Professor Challenger's descendant.
- Cult Holmes: The Lost World: In this BBC 7 Cult Holmes story, Holmes is investigating the damage done by Challenger in bringing dinosaurs over from the plateau. Malone's account of events is referred to as if it had been the version of events in the BBC TV adaptation of The Lost World, rather than the novel.
- In Los Sabios en Salamanca (The Sages in Salamanca), a Spanish short novel by Alberto López Aroca, included in the book Los Espectros Conjurados (ISBN 978-84-607-9866-8), Challenger and his friend Lord John Roxton meet Professor Abraham Van Helsing (from Bram Stoker's Dracula) in Salamanca, and attend a meeting of the Sociedad Hermética Española (a Spanish esoteric society). In the story also appear other characters, as H.P. Lovecraft's Randolph Carter, and Spanish writers Francisco de Quevedo and Diego de Torres Villarroel.
- In the 1960 novel World of the Gods by Pel Torro (a pseudonym of Lionel Fanthorpe), a malevolent shapeshifting alien takes on the physical form of Professor Challenger, believing him to be a real-life Earth scientist, and is then forced to remain in this form for the rest of the novel.
- The third book in the Iris Wildthyme series by Obverse Books, Miss Wildthyme and Friends Investigate, begins with a novella entitled The Found World by Jim Smith, a pseudo-sequel to The Lost World featuring Challenger, Dr. John H. Watson and Dracula, among others.
- The third supplement for the Forgotten Futures role playing game is George E. Challenger's Mysterious World (1994), based on and including the Challenger novels and stories.
- Professor William Rutherford, the real-life model for Challenger, is portrayed by actor John Sessions in one of the series of BBC Films titled Murder Rooms: The Dark Beginnings of Sherlock Holmes. The episode by Stephen Gallagher opens with the young Conan Doyle's attendance at a lantern slide lecture by famed explorer Everard im Thurn featuring the 'Lost World' plateau of Mount Roraima. The story goes on to hint at experiences that Doyle would later draw upon for the novel.
- Professor Challenger is a major supporting character in the novel Sherlock Holmes im Reich des Ctulhu ("Sherlock Holmes in the Realm of Cthulhu") by Klaus-Peter Walther and the audio play after that novel.

== Portrayals ==
Sir Arthur Conan Doyle was the first person to portray Professor Challenger, dressing and making up as the professor for a photograph he wanted included in The Lost World's initial serialized publication in the Strand Magazine. The editor refused, feeling that such hoaxes were potentially damaging. Hodder & Stoughton had no such qualms and featured the image in the first book edition.

Since then, the following actors have played the role:

- Wallace Beery in the 1925 film The Lost World.
- Francis L. Sullivan in the 1944 BBC radio adaptations of The Lost World and The Poison Belt.
- Claude Rains in the 1960 film The Lost World.
- Basil Rathbone in Dinosaurs!, a 1966 radio-style audio adaptation of The Lost World released on MGM/Leo the Lion Records.
- Francis de Wolff in a 1975 BBC Radio 4 broadcast of The Lost World.
- John Rhys-Davies in the 1992 film The Lost World and its 1992 sequel Return to the Lost World.
- Armin Shimerman in a radio-style audio cassette/compact disc adaptation from Alien Voices in 1997.
- Patrick Bergin in the 1998 film The Lost World.
- Peter McCauley in the early 1999 cable-TV movie adaptation and the subsequent 1999–2002 television series Sir Arthur Conan Doyle's The Lost World.
- Bob Hoskins in the 2001 film The Lost World. Airing in the UK in two parts over Christmas Day and Boxing Day in 2001, it was the first British film adaptation.
- Bruce Boxleitner played a modernised version of Challenger as a United States Air Force lieutenant colonel in the 2005 film King of the Lost World.
- Bill Paterson in the 2011 BBC Radio adaptations of When the World Screamed and The Disintegration Machine.
- David Robb in the 2011 Classic Serial BBC Radio 4 adaptation of The Lost World.
- Martin W. Payne in the 2019 short film Professor Challenger & The Disintegration Machine.
