= Lord John Roxton =

Fictional character, introduced 1912

Lord John Roxton (a fictional title derived from the English parish of Roxton, Bedfordshire) is a supporting character in the Professor Challenger series of stories by Arthur Conan Doyle. He makes his initial appearance in the first entry of this series, The Lost World (1912), wherein he is a member of the expedition to the titular land, and is a prominent character in some of the subsequent stories as well, specifically The Poison Belt and The Land of Mist.

== Description ==
The narrator of The Lost World, Edward D. Malone, describes him as being tall and thin, with peculiarly rounded shoulders, "dark ginger hair," skin which is "a rich flower-pot red from sun and wind" and cool, masterful blue eyes. Malone compares him to Don Quixote and Napoleon III as well as to the quintessential English sporting gentleman. Roxton greets the prospect of visiting the Lost World with delight, largely because of the prospect of bringing home a dinosaur as a hunting trophy:

"...a sportin' risk, young fellah, that's the salt of existence. Then it's worth livin' again. We're all gettin' a deal too soft and dull and comfy. Give me the great waste lands and the wide spaces, with a gun in my fist and somethin' to look for that's worth findin'. I've tried war and steeplechasin' and aeroplanes, but this huntin' of beasts that look like a lobster-supper dream is a brand-new sensation."—The Lost World, ch. 6

The third son of the Duke of Pomfret, Roxton has travelled the world, as a big game hunter in addition to his pursuits as an explorer in the main bodies of the novels. Being an enemy of slavery, he made enemies in Brazil in his campaign against that institution, a fact which comes into play over the course of the plot of The Lost World.

The titular "lost world" is located on a remote South American plateau, accessed by using a felled tree as a bridge across a vast sheer drop. When Lord John Roxton and the other members of his expedition use this makeshift bridge to enter the Lost World, Roxton is the only one who takes the easier but more dangerous option of walking across it; all the others sit astride the tree trunk and inch their way across.

The character was based on Conan Doyle's friend, the British Consul and Irish nationalist Roger Casement.

== Other appearances ==
- John Roxton is also the name of a character used by Michael Crichton in his 1995 novel The Lost World. Roxton is mentioned on page 19 as an "enthusiastic fund-raiser" looking for fossils in Mongolia.
- Roxton features in Philip José Farmer's fictional biography of Tarzan, Tarzan Alive, where it is claimed that he is a descendant of Lord Byron.
- Roxton is a supporting character in the novelette The Found World in the collection Miss Wildthyme and Friends Investigate by Jim Smith.
- Roxton appears briefly as a supporting character in the Doctor Who New Adventures novel All-Consuming Fire by Andy Lane
- a Ser Jon Roxton, aka Bold Jon Roxton, (also spelled John) appears in George R. R. Martin's The Princess and the Queen, Fire & Blood (novel) and The Rise of the Dragon as a knight and the head of House Roxton during the civil war known as the Dance of the Dragons.

== Actor portrayals ==
The following actors have portrayed Roxton in adaptations of The Lost World:

- Lewis Stone in the 1925 silent film, in which Roxton was a knight instead of a lord.
- Michael Rennie in the 1960 film.
- John de Lancie in the 1997 radio-style drama of released by Alien Voices.
- David Nerman in the 1998 film.
- William Snow in the 1999 television series.
- Tom Ward in the 2001 BBC miniseries.
- Rhett Giles in the 2005 loose adaptation King of the Lost World.
