= The Lost World (1960 film) =

American film directed by Irwin Allen

- Theatrical release poster
- Directed by: Irwin Allen
- Screenplay by: Irwin Allen; Charles Bennett
- Based on: The Lost World; 1912 novel by Arthur Conan Doyle
- Produced by: Irwin Allen; Cliff Reid
- Starring: Michael Rennie; Jill St. John; David Hedison; Claude Rains; Fernando Lamas
- Cinematography: Winton C. Hoch
- Edited by: Hugh S. Fowler
- Music by: Paul Sawtell; Bert Shefter
- Distributed by: 20th Century Fox
- Release date: July 13, 1960 (U.S.)
- Running time: 97 minutes
- Country: United States
- Language: English
- Budget: $1,515,000
- Box office: $2,500,000 (US/ Canada)

The Lost World is a 1960 American fantasy adventure film directed by Irwin Allen, loosely based on the 1912 novel of the same name by Arthur Conan Doyle. Shot in De Luxe Color and CinemaScope, the film's plot revolves around the exploration of a plateau in Venezuela inhabited by cannibals, dinosaurs, carnivorous plants, and giant spiders. The cast includes Claude Rains, David Hedison, Fernando Lamas, Jill St. John, and Michael Rennie.

== Plot ==
Professor Challenger, a celebrated biologist and anthropologist, reports to the London Zoological Society that he has discovered living specimens of supposedly extinct animals, including dinosaurs, on an expedition to the Amazon Basin and up a barely known plateau. He challenges the Society to sponsor a second expedition to the plateau.

Much to Challenger's dismay, he attracts a few very unscientific people to join him on his second journey to the Amazon. This expedition group includes big-game hunter Lord John Roxton, and newsman Ed Malone whose publisher advances $100,000 to pay for the expedition. The journey from London is depicted via aerial views of Rio de Janeiro, and Angel Falls. The publisher's adventurous daughter Jennifer and son David join the group at the head of the Amazon. Also in the group is Zoological Society bigwig Professor Summerlee, helicopter pilot Manuel Gomez, and his sidekick Jose Costa.

During the first night on the plateau, a Brontosaurus wrecks the helicopter. As the expedition proceeds, Malone chases a primitive jungle girl through cobwebs to a giant spider, killing it and bringing her back to camp. The native girl later falls for David. Roxton argues with the others, and jealousies over Jennifer lead to a fistfight between Malone and Roxton.

They discover the diary of a previous explorer, Burton White, who was lost on the plateau. Roxton is mentioned several times in the diary. Roxton reveals that he had visited the plateau three years before, and claims the plateau holds a bounty of diamonds. This motivates Jose to stay with the party instead of striking out on his own to escape from the plateau.

At one point, Malone and Jennifer are separated from the others and have a near-death encounter during a fight involving a Brontosaurus and another dinosaur. Cannibals capture the party, but before they can become dinner the jungle girl leads them to an underground passage that leads down off the plateau. Along the way, they encounter Burton White, now living as a blind hermit. (The cannibals have a taboo against killing the blind.)

They encounter more obstacles — pursuit by the cannibals, spiders, plants, the "Graveyard of the Damned", and a dinosaur in a lava pit guarding the diamonds, which kills Costa. Gomez sacrifices himself while breaking a rock dam which holds back the lava, killing the dinosaur.

During a volcanic eruption, the survivors of the Challenger party escape from the plateau, Challenger carrying the egg of a Tyrannosaurus rex. The financial security of the party is secure because Lord Roxton filled a couple of the bellows pockets of his hunting jacket with diamonds, and shares them with everyone. The dinosaur egg hatches when it is dropped by accident, and Professor Challenger decides to take the infant T. Rex back to London with them.

== Cast ==
- Michael Rennie as Lord John Roxton — An experienced big-game hunter who joins the expedition.
- Jill St. John as Jennifer Holmes — The daughter of the owner of the Global News.
- David Hedison as Ed Malone — A journalist at the Global News who volunteers to join the expedition.
- Claude Rains as Professor George Edward Challenger — The short-tempered leader of the expedition.
- Fernando Lamas as Manuel Gomez — The expedition's helicopter pilot.
- Richard Haydn as Professor Summerlee — A rival of Challenger's who joins the expedition.
- Ray Stricklyn as David Holmes — The brother of Jennifer Holmes and the son of Malone's boss Stuart Holmes.
- Jay Novello as Costa — Gomez's assistant who also guides the expedition into the plateau.
- Ian Wolfe as Burton White — a professor who visited the Amazon Plateau before Challenger's expedition.
- John Graham as Stuart Holmes — Edward Malone's employer and the father of Jennifer and David Holmes.
- Colin Campbell as Prof. Waldron who organises the expedition.
- Vitina Marcus as the Native Girl.

== Production ==
In 1959, Allen purchased the rights to Doyle's novel for $100,000. He wanted to make the film with Trevor Howard and Peter Ustinov in support of Rains, as well as Victor Mature and Gilbert Roland (who had been in the 1925 film). None of these plans came to fruition. He hired Charles Bennett to help him adapt the book into a script and commissioned Willis O'Brien, who worked on the 1925 film, to do the models. He said he wanted to start filming on 15 October 1959.

Allen eventually received financing to make the film from Buddy Adler, head of production at 20th Century Fox.

Special effects for the film were rather basic and involved monitor lizards, iguanas, and young crocodiles affixed with miniature horns, and fins. Director Allen later stated that though he wanted stop motion models, he could only work with live animals in accordance with the studio's budget.

== Reception ==
Film critic Dana M. Reemes registered this assessment of the film in 1988:

It is a regrettable fact that an awful modern sound and color version of The Lost World has been made. Indeed, many people have never heard of the silent version (much less Arthur Conan Doyle’s book), and the negative qualities of this later film have done much to obscure the importance of the classic story…Irwin Allen’s version of The Lost World is an abominable travesty in every respect…”

Reemes added this caveat: “On the positive side, one might regard this film’s mere existence as a powerful incentive to create a new and definitive version of Conan Doyle’s original story.”

== Legacy ==
Irwin Allen utilized stock footage from this film for episodes of his various TV series, including Land of the Giants, Lost in Space, The Time Tunnel, and Voyage to the Bottom of the Sea. In 1966, Irwin Allen even tried to sell a TV series based on the film, as he had done with Voyage to the Bottom of the Sea, but was unsuccessful.“Producer Allen later recycled footage of Hedison battling the giant spider in his early juvenile Voyage to the Bottom of the Sea television series.”

== Comic book adaptation ==
- Dell Four Color #1145 (August 1960)

== See also ==
- List of American films of 1960
- List of films featuring dinosaurs
- Journey to the Beginning of Time (1967)

== Bibliography ==
- Reemes, Dana M. 1988. Directed by Jack Arnold. McFarland & Company, Jefferson, North Carolina 1988. ISBN 9780899503318
