= When the World Screamed =

- Short story by Arthur Conan Doyle
- Country: United Kingdom
- Language: English
- Genre: Science fiction

Publication
- Publication date: 1928

Chronology
- Series: Professor Challenger
The Land of Mist	The Disintegration Machine

"When the World Screamed" is a science fiction short story by British writer Arthur Conan Doyle, featuring his character Professor Challenger. It was first published in Liberty magazine, from 25 February to 3 March 1928.

It is narrated in the first person by Mr Peerless Jones, an expert in artesian borings who is seen for the first time.

It is the fourth Professor Challenger story and retains only Challenger and Malone from the first novel.

== Plot summary ==
Professor Challenger, with the help of Mr Edward Malone and Mr Peerless Jones, drills into the earth until he reaches the mantle, convinced that it is a sentient being, and that by doing so he will be the first person to alert it to mankind's presence. He awakens the giant creature, which then proceeds to destroy his excavation, covering the spectators with a noxious liquid in the process.

== Reception ==
Arthur C. Clarke noted the story's similarities to Jack Williamson's 1934 novelette, "Born of the Sun," and the irony in naming of the later Glomar Challenger which drew deep-sea core samples from the Earth's crust.

== See also ==
- 1928 in science fiction
- The Lost World (1912 Conan Doyle novel)
- The Poison Belt
- The Land of Mist
- "The Disintegration Machine"
