= King of the Lost World =

- DVD cover art
- Directed by: Leigh Scott
- Written by: David Michael Latt; Carlos De Los Rios; Leigh Scott
- Produced by: David Michael Latt; David Rimawi; Paul Bales
- Starring: Bruce Boxleitner; Jeff Denton; Rhett Giles; Steve Railsback; Thomas Downey
- Cinematography: Steven Parker
- Edited by: David Michael Latt
- Music by: Ralph Rieckermann
- Distributed by: The Asylum
- Release date: December 15, 2005
- Running time: 80 minutes
- Country: United States
- Language: English
- Budget: $1,000,000

King of the Lost World is a 2005 American fantasy monster adventure film produced by The Asylum. The film is adapted loosely from the 1912 novel The Lost World by Arthur Conan Doyle, the creator of Sherlock Holmes, but the film bears a closer resemblance to the remake of King Kong released in the same year, particularly as both stories center on a giant ape. Hence, King of the Lost World is a mockbuster of that film, a tradition that The Asylum usually undertakes.

== Plot ==
A plane crashes in a remote jungle. Many survive, but the front end of the plane and the cockpit are nowhere to be found. The only way to seek help is to find the cockpit and radio a message.

Ed Malone (Jeff Denton) climbs a small hill and sees the cockpit about a mile distant. A group decides to leave the plane to search for the radio. John Roxton (Rhett Giles) leads the group through the jungle. The remaining survivors stay at the crash site in case a plane passes by.

The group arrives at the fuselage to learn that it's not part of the plane they crashed in. In addition, the radio and critical instruments have been stripped and removed. They are startled by the arrival of Lieutenant Colonel Challenger (Bruce Boxleitner), who managed to travel alone to the downed plane, carrying a briefcase he doesn't seem to want to part with.

The group continues to look for the cockpit with some individuals being killed or lost along the way. They encounter a military plane. Challenger tries to rig a missile as a signal gun, but fails. The group finds a cavern for shelter that night, and are attacked by giant prehistoric scorpions (Brontoscorpio). John and Tianka are killed, while a desperate Ed, Challenger, Rita, Dana, and Natalie flee for safety. As they escape from the stream, they are captured by natives living on a plateau. It is learned that the natives have been stripping the planes to avoid outsiders. The natives are discovered to be survivors from a crash long ago, and have developed a sacrificial rite to appease the creatures of the jungle. Dana and Natalie are brainwashed into joining them, while Ed is chosen as the sacrifice.

However, the sacrificial ceremony fails when a giant ape (Gigantopithecus) attacks a swarm of flying dragon-like lizards, and Dana (who faked being brainwashed) saves Ed. They meet up with Challenger and Rita, then spot military jets overhead, moving in to attack the giant ape, but are destroyed. Challenger kills a native, but dies during the ape's rampage, leaving Ed to fight it alone.

Ed detonates a nuclear bomb from a crashed plane and successfully kills the ape, but also destroys their cockpit, trapping Ed, Rita, and Dana in the jungle. They contemplate dying, to which Ed tersely replies, "Not today," as they stare in the distance. However, one of the Flying giant lizards survived the nuclear bomb detonation.

== Cast ==
- Bruce Boxleitner as Lieutenant Colonel Challenger
- Jeff Denton as Ed Malone
- Rhett Giles as John Roxton
- Sarah Lieving as Rita Summerlee
- Christina Rosenberg as Dana
- Steve Railsback as Larry
- Chriss Anglin as Olo
- Amanda Ward as Natalie
- Boni Yanagisawa as Tianka
- Andrew Lauer as Steven
- Thomas Downey as Reggie
- Amanda Barton as Taylor
- James Ferris as Yuri
- Jennifer Lee Wiggins as Etienne
- Angela Horvath as Chrissy
- Eliza Swenson as Gloria

== Differences from The Lost World ==
- The setting is the 21st century rather than the early 20th century.
- In the novel by Arthur Conan Doyle, it was made clear that Ed Malone was Irish. In this film he is American.
- In the novel, the character of Professor Challenger was a misanthropic scientist. In this film, he is a lieutenant colonel in the United States Air Force.
- The character of Professor Summerlee is now a woman named Rita Summerlee.
- The expedition in the novel originally journeyed to the Lost World to prove Prof. Challenger's claims that dinosaurs lived in modern times. In the film, the expedition accidentally crash-land into the Lost World.
- There was no giant ape in the novel, the original antagonists were a race of ape-men living in the Lost World.
- In the film, the characters are stranded on an island, however, in the novel and previous film adaptions, the story takes place on a plateau.
- There are Brontoscorpios (giant scorpions), giant spiders, man-eating vines and giant winged lizards in the film. In the novel there are only dinosaurs and other prehistoric creatures.
- In the movie many characters, including Challenger and John Roxton die. However they survive in the original novel.

== Reception ==
HorrorTalk found the movie to be one of the Asylum's best, stating "The bottom line is King is a fun romp through the jungle from beginning to end."

Dread Central agreed it was a better work, but criticized the third act as convoluted, as well as lacking the titular ape.
