= 1929 in science fiction =

The year 1929 was marked, in science fiction, by the following events.

== Births and deaths ==
=== Births ===
- January 28 : Parke Godwin, American writer, (died 2013)
- July 9 : Zheng Wenguang, Chinese writer, (died 2003)
- July 10 : George Clayton Johnson, American writer, (died 2015)
- August 27 : Ira Levin, American writer, (died 2007)
- October 1 : (in French) Demètre Ioakimidis, French writer and anthologist, (died 2012)
- October 21: Ursula K. Le Guin, American writer, (died 2018)
- December 27 : Philippe Curval, French writer, (died 2023)

== Events ==
- Creation of the American magazine Wonder Stories, edited by Hugo Gernsback.

== Literary releases ==
=== Novels ===
- (in French) Mond-Rak 1, by Otfrid von Hanstein.
- (in Russian) The Air Seller by Alexander Belayev.

=== Short stories ===
- (in French) The last man, by Wallace West.
- (in French) The Killing Flash, by Hugo Gernsback.
- The Disintegration Machine, by Arthur Conan Doyle.

== Audiovisual outputs ==
=== Movies ===
- Woman in the Moon, by Fritz Lang.
- High Treason, by Maurice Elvey.

== Awards ==
The main science-fiction Awards known at the present time did not exist at this time.

== See also ==
- 1929 in science
- 1928 in science fiction
- 1930 in science fiction
