= The Land of Mist =

1926 novel by Arthur Conan Doyle

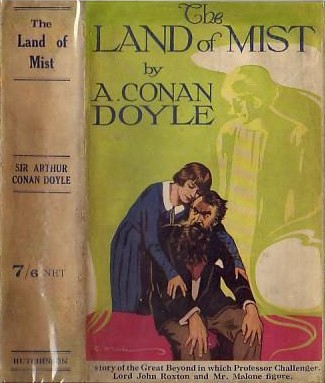
- First edition cover
- Author: Arthur Conan Doyle
- Language: English
- Series: Professor Challenger
- Genre: Science fiction
- Publisher: Hutchinson & Co
- Publication date: 1926
- Publication place: United Kingdom
- Media type: Print (Hardback)
- Pages: 294
- Preceded by: The Poison Belt
- Followed by: "When the World Screamed"

The Land of Mist is a novel by British writer Arthur Conan Doyle, published in 1926.

Although this is a Professor Challenger story, it centres more on his daughter Enid and his old friend Edward Malone who later marry. Another friend from the 1912 novel The Lost World, Lord John Roxton, is also involved in the novel's second half. Professor Summerlee, who has died of old age around this time, is referred to by the mediums (much to the anger of Professor Challenger).

== Plot ==
Reporter Ned Malone (who was one of the main characters in Arthur Conan Doyle's The Lost World) returns in this novel, in which he and Professor Challenger's daughter Enid are assigned to cover the current spiritualist phenomenon. They discover there really is something to a seance, and they try to convince Challenger to get interested in their investigations.

== Spiritualism ==
Heavily influenced by Doyle's growing belief in Spiritualism after the death of his son, brother, and two nephews in World War I, the book focuses on Edward Malone's at first professional, and later personal interest in Spiritualism.

There is a suggestion in chapter two that the deaths of "ten million young men" in World War I was punishment by the "Central Intelligence" (that is, God) for humanity's laughing at the evidence for life after death.

== See also ==
- 1926 in science fiction
