= The Lost World (1998 film) =

1998 film by Bob Keen

- Directed by: Bob Keen
- Screenplay by: Jean LaFleur; Leopold St-Pierre
- Based on: The Lost World; 1912 novel by Arthur Conan Doyle
- Produced by: Danny Rossner; Murray Shostak
- Starring: Patrick Bergin; Jayne Heitmeyer
- Cinematography: Barry Gravelle
- Edited by: Isabelle Levesque
- Music by: Milan Kymlicka
- Production company: Fries Film Group
- Distributed by: Trimark Pictures
- Release date: October 13, 1998
- Running time: 97 minutes
- Country: United States
- Language: English

The Lost World is a 1998 adventure film, loosely based on the 1912 novel of the same name by Arthur Conan Doyle. The film includes the characters Professor George Challenger and Lord John Roxton, who also feature in Conan Doyle's other Doctor Challenger novels. It is a mockbuster of the 1997 film The Lost World: Jurassic Park.

== Plot ==
In 1934, the researcher Maple White and his assistant Azbek discover a world populated by dinosaurs situated on a Mongolian plateau. Soon after the pair are attacked by Eudimorphodons who kill Azbek, though White survives. White seeks out his friend, George Challenger, giving an account of his adventures, proposing a further expedition to fully explore the plateau.

In London, Challenger organizes a lecture in an attempt to convince his colleagues, Professor Summerlee and Lord Thomas, to finance the further expedition with the goal of proving dinosaurs exist on the plateau. Lord Thomas grants permission for the expedition on the condition Summerlee accompanies Challenger. Oscar Perreault, a spectator at the lecture, proposes to pay for the expedition's expenses if the scientists capture a living dinosaur and sends his associate, John Roxton, to represent his interests.

Challenger also invites journalist Arthur Malone and White's daughter Amanda, on the expedition as well. In Mongolia, the team meets their guides, Myar and Djena. En route, their transportation suffers a breakdown and the journey continues on foot, after which one of the guides is killed by a prehistoric insect. On reaching the foot of the plateau, Amanda is abducted by Neanderthals, prompting a search. Challenger and Roxton find Amanda suspended from a ritual framework. During the rescue, they face the Neanderthals, who they quickly defeat. The team attempts to escape the plateau in a hot air balloon. Summerlee observes nearby Quetzalcoatlus, and they attack the balloon, causing Myar to fall. The balloon also suffers a large tear and drops back to the plateau.

They discover symbols on a cave wall, portraying a tribe, the Kerraks, who interacted with prehistoric creatures and fought the Neanderthals. The Neanderthals eventually defeating the Kerraks to avoid the destruction of the 'Lost World'. A second larger cave is then discovered, where Roxton attempts to explode a dynamite charge to kill the team and escape alone; he is foiled by Challenger, however. An escape attempt is then made by fashioning a parachute using the remains of the balloon and after suffering a further attack by the creatures which inhabit the plateau, they manage to escape.

Returning to London, Challenger communicates the death of his companions to the students and, in an attempt to discourage further expeditions, he chooses to state his expedition found nothing. It is revealed Malone has survived and adapted to life on the plateau.

== Cast ==
- Patrick Bergin as Professor George Challenger
- Jayne Heitmeyer as Amanda White
- Julian Casey as Arthur Malone
- David Nerman as John Roxton
- Michael Sinelnikoff as Professor Summerlee
- Gregoriane Minot Payeur as Djena
- Jack Langedijk as Maple White
- Russell Yuen as Azbek/Myar/Neanderthal
- James Bradford as Lord Thomas
- Jacques Lessard as Oscar Perreault
- Martin Sims as Student

== Home video ==
The film was released direct to VHS in several countries and on DVD in the UK and Australia.

== See also ==
- List of films featuring dinosaurs
