= The Lost World (2001 film) =

2001 British television film by Stuart Orme

- Based on: The Lost World by Arthur Conan Doyle
- Screenplay by: Tony Mulholland; Adrian Hodges
- Directed by: Stuart Orme
- Starring: Bob Hoskins; James Fox; Matthew Rhys; Tom Ward; Elaine Cassidy; Peter Falk
- Composer: Robert Lane
- Country of origin: United Kingdom
- Original language: English

Production
- Executive producers: Kate Harwood; Jane Tranter
- Producer: Christopher Hall
- Cinematography: David Odd
- Editor: David Yardley
- Running time: 75 minutes per episode 145 minutes total
- Production companies: BBC; A&E Network; RTL

Original release
- Network: BBC One
- Release: 25 December – 26 December 2001

The Lost World is a 2001 British made-for-television film adaptation of Arthur Conan Doyle's 1912 novel The Lost World, directed by Stuart Orme and adapted by Tony Mulholland and Adrian Hodges. It was filmed at various locations on the West Coast of New Zealand. The 145-minute film was divided into two 75-minute episodes when broadcast on BBC One on 25 and 26 December 2001, receiving 8.68 million and 6.98 million viewers respectively. Bob Hoskins stars as Professor Challenger, with James Fox, Peter Falk, Matthew Rhys, Tom Ward and Elaine Cassidy in supporting roles.

== Plot ==
=== Part 1 ===
While in the Amazon rainforest, Professor George Challenger shoots an animal he believes to be a pterosaur. On returning to England, Challenger crashes a lecture at the Natural History Museum held by his rival, Professor Leo Summerlee. Challenger proposes an expedition to discover the home of the pterosaur, but is dismissed by the science community. However, big game hunter Lord John Roxton and Daily Gazette reporter Edward Malone volunteer to join and finance the expedition; the latter because his love interest, Gladys, says she will only marry a man of adventure. A sceptical, pompous Summerlee also joins.

On the voyage to South America, Challenger reveals a map created by a Portuguese man, Father Luis Mendoz, leading to a remote Brazilian plateau. Upon this plateau he encountered dinosaurs, which he mistook for dragons, during a previous expedition. They travel to a Christian mission in the Amazon, meeting Agnes Clooney and her uncle Reverend Theo Kerr, who condemns Charles Darwin's theory of evolution. Roxton immediately takes a liking to Agnes' tomboyish behaviour and flirts with her. Agnes volunteers to join the expedition as a translator. However, in the jungle, the expedition's porters flee out of superstition, but Kerr arrives, repeatedly trying to convince Challenger to turn back.

They reach the edge of the plateau and find a cave concealing a pathway to the plateau, but discover a blockage caused by explosives. They later find a gorge leading straight to the plateau, using a tree as a substitute for a bridge. However, when all but Kerr make it across, he suddenly knocks the tree into the gorge and leaves Challenger and the others stranded. Venturing into the plateau's jungle, they find Iguanodons, Hypsilophodons, Pteranodons, Allosaurus, and a strange species of aggressive ape-men. Malone finds a lake which he names after Gladys. Malone and Agnes are chased by an Allosaurus, but evade it after it falls into a large pitfall trap with spikes.

=== Part 2 ===
Escaping the trap, Malone and Agnes find Roxton at the lake; learning the ape-men kidnapped Challenger and Summerlee. Warriors from an indigenous tribe appear in order to help them rescue the professors, as well as the son of their chieftain, Achille. Roxton plays a leading role in the rescue, shooting many of the ape-men. Per Challenger's request, the surviving ape-men are taken captive by the tribe, despite the protests of Achille and Roxton. Arriving at the village, the tribe is revealed to be descendants of surviving members from Mendoz's expedition and mistake Challenger for Mendoz, who taught them Christianity. The chief shows the other end of the cave and reveals that it was blocked by a man who visited the tribe and trapped them within the plateau.

The travelers explore the plateau and see more prehistoric life, including Brachiosaurus and Diplodocus. Agnes grows closer to Malone and realises she does not love Roxton due to his love of hunting and indifference to the prehistoric inhabitants. Meanwhile, Summerlee repeatedly attempts to escape with no success. Roxton falls in love with the chief's daughter, Maree, a woman who is quite similar to him. He earns the chieftain's permission to marry her after killing an Entelodon for the tribe.

Later, after having buried one of their children, the ape-men howl and attract two Allosaurus who attack the village. In the chaos, the chief is killed saving his daughter and several villagers. Malone and Agnes release the captured ape-men before Roxton and Malone manage to kill both dinosaurs with an elephant gun. At the same time, Summerlee reopens the cave using a home-made explosive using guano and gunpowder. The explorers use the open cave to flee as Achille and his tribe attack them, blaming them for their village's destruction. Roxton is stabbed by one of the ape-men with his hunting knife, but uses his pistol to buy time against the Indians. Roxton seemingly dies from his wound, and the tribe does not follow the explorers.

Challenger, Summerlee, Malone, and Agnes return to the Amazon and encounter Kerr who seems to have gone mad. He confesses he was the one who sealed the cave and that he stranded them to prevent the plateau's exposure—believing it to be the work of Satan due to the presence of the ape-men. When Kerr produces a revolver, Summerlee wrestles him for it, only for Kerr to be accidentally shot and killed. The expedition porters later find the survivors, allowing them to return to London and the safety of civilisation. Malone discovers Gladys has become engaged to another man who is, counter to their past discussions, quite dull. This helps a grateful Malone realise that he actually loves Agnes. At Challenger's press event, he unveils a juvenile Pteranodon he picked up as an egg. However, the excited crowd scares the Pteranodon out of a window. Malone and Summerlee convince Challenger to pretend the whole expedition was a hoax to protect the plateau's inhabitants from further destruction, sacrificing his reputation and success.

Challenger sets off to find Atlantis while Summerlee remains in London with his family. Malone and Agnes admit their love for each other, and Malone decides to pursue a career as a novelist. As the Pteranodon flies over the Atlantic Ocean, Roxton is revealed to be alive and living with Maree and the villagers in peace.

== Cast ==
- Bob Hoskins as Professor George Challenger
- James Fox as Professor Leo Summerlee
- Tom Ward as Lord John Roxton
- Matthew Rhys as Edward Malone
- Elaine Cassidy as Agnes Clooney
- Peter Falk as Reverend Theo Kerr
- Nathaniel Lees as Chief
- Tamati Te Nohotu as Achille
- Nicole Whippy as Maree
- Inia Maxwell as Indian Leader
- Tessa Peake-Jones as Mrs Summerlee
- Tim Healy as McArdle
- Joanna Page as Gladys
- Tom Goodman-Hill as Arthur Hare
- Robert Hardy as Professor Illingworth
- Malcom Shields as Lead Ape (and Ape Choreography)

== Home media ==
The Lost World was released on VHS and DVD in the United Kingdom on 3 June 2002; the DVD version is presented as a single 145-minute instalment, and contains a 5.1 Dolby Digital soundtrack, audio commentary with Stuart Orme and Christopher Hall, and the 29-minute documentary Inside The Lost World. A budget version of the DVD with fewer features was released in early 2005, bundled with The Times newspaper and sold exclusively at WHSmith. In the United States, The Lost World was released on DVD on 29 October 2002, presented in 4:3 pan and scan format with a stereo soundtrack. This release also contained the 90-minute History Channel documentary Dinosaur Secrets Revealed and an alternative 21-minute documentary on the making of the series.

== Reception ==
John Leonard, TV critic for New York magazine praised the special effects for the time, saying "New Zealand looks like Brazil, and the beasts are the best on a small screen." Writing for DVD Talk, Holly E. Ordway described the series as "a straightforward and entertaining adventure story", praising the modernised changes made to the book's storyline but calling the characters "caricatures". Writing for Moria Reviews, Richard Scheib noted that the production was intended as a follow-up to the BBC documentary series Walking with Dinosaurs (1999), using the same visual effects company Framestore, and that the mini-series was largely faithful to the Arthur Conan Doyle novel. The DVD box art for the region 2 release has a quote from The Saturday Times which states "Mix one part animated dinosaurs with two parts breeches and bonnets and an instant BBC classic is born".

== See also ==
- List of films featuring dinosaurs
