= 1928 in science fiction =

The year 1928 was marked, in science fiction, by the following events.

== Births ==
- March 6 : William F. Nolan, American writer
- June 8 : Kate Wilhelm, American writer (died 2018)
- July 3 : Georges-Jean Arnaud, French writer (died 2020).
- July 16 : Robert Sheckley, American writer, (died 2005)
- July 28 : Angélica Gorodischer, Argentine writer.
- August 11 : Alan E. Nourse, American writer (died 1992)
- December 16 : Philip K. Dick, American writer (died 1982)

== Literary releases ==
=== Novels ===
- The Skylark of Space, by Edward Elmer Smith.
- (in Russian) Amphibian Man, by Alexander Beliaev.
- The Rocket to the Moon, by Thea von Harbou.
- (in French) Hans Hardts Mondfahrt, by Otto Willi Gail.

=== Short stories ===
- When the World Screamed, by Arthur Conan Doyle.

== Awards ==
The main science-fiction Awards known at the present time did not exist at this time.

== See also ==
- 1928 in science
- 1927 in science fiction
- 1929 in science fiction
