= Alien Voices =

- Founder: John de Lancie; Leonard Nimoy
- Status: Inactive
- Distributor: Simon & Schuster Audio
- Genre: Audio Books
- Country of origin: United States
- Official website: http://www.alienvoices.net/

Alien Voices was a project set up by John de Lancie and Leonard Nimoy which specialized in audiobooks of science fiction novels in the style of radio plays. The productions were distributed by Simon & Schuster Audio, but the project was shut down following pressure from the distributor for greater sales and the dissatisfaction of de Lancie and Nimoy at this direction. The productions featured a number of cast members from the various Star Trek series. Digital editions of the plays were released in 2012.

== History ==
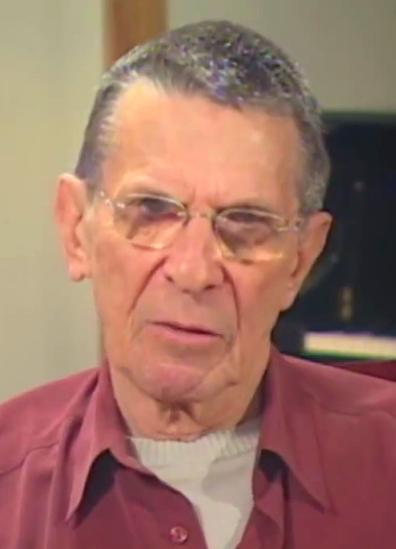
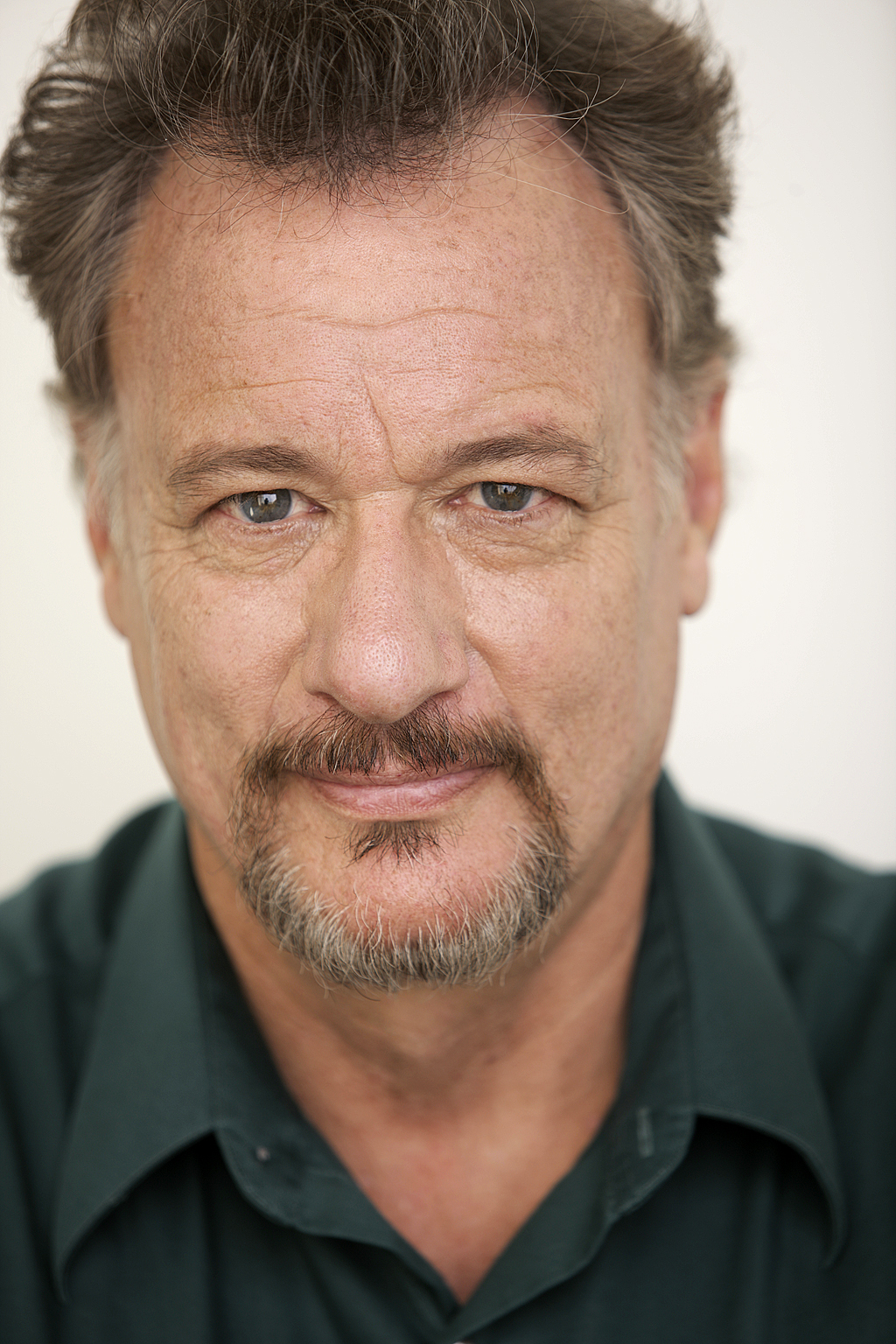
Leonard Nimoy and John de Lancie were the co-founders of Alien Voices

John de Lancie approached fellow Star Trek actor Leonard Nimoy with a proposal to record radio plays productions of classic science fiction novels. Nimoy later said that he had always had a love for radioplays since he was a child, and so he was quite enthusiastic. The pair proposed the project to the audio division of Simon & Schuster who agreed to back it.

Productions included Spock vs. Q, which was recorded in person at a Star Trek convention. A sequel was produced later in 2000. An attempt was made to turn the Alien Voices version of The First Men in the Moon into a live-action Disney production. However, de Lancie later explained that they wanted to modify the story itself such as adding a teenage girl to the cast and setting it in modern times, even suggesting that the story be relocated from the Moon to Mars. Specials were created for the Sci Fi Channel of The First Men in the Moon and The Lost World.

The radio plays featured a variety of Star Trek actors, including William Shatner as the Moon Emperor in The First Men in the Moon. Other Star Trek alumni who appeared in the productions included Armin Shimerman, Roxann Dawson and Andrew Robinson in the production of Journey to the Center of the Earth, and Kate Mulgrew, Nana Visitor and Ethan Phillips in The Invisible Man.

The Alien Voices project ran for four years until there was increased pressure from Simon & Schuster to sell more units. De Lancie later explained that he thought at the time, "Oh my God, what am I doing? I’m going around peddling audio books! This is not what I want to do." Sales had been around 25,000 for each book, but the cost of producing the plays had required sales to have been three or four times that to re-coup those costs. Whilst he enjoyed the creative aspect of Alien Voices, de Lancie said that he simply wasn't interested in the selling aspect. Nimoy said in an interview in 2003 that he and de Lancie had "done what we've set out to do" and that he did not expect there to be any further installments of the Spock vs. Q productions, saying that they "did that quite successfully, [and] had a wonderful time doing it". The productions were released in digital formats in 2012.

== Productions ==
- The First Men in the Moon
- Journey To The Center Of The Earth
- The Invisible Man
- The Lost World
- The Time Machine
- Spock vs. Q (subtitled Armageddon Tonight)
- Spock vs. Q: The Sequel (subtitled Did I Say That?)
