= The Disintegration Machine =

- Short story by Arthur Conan Doyle
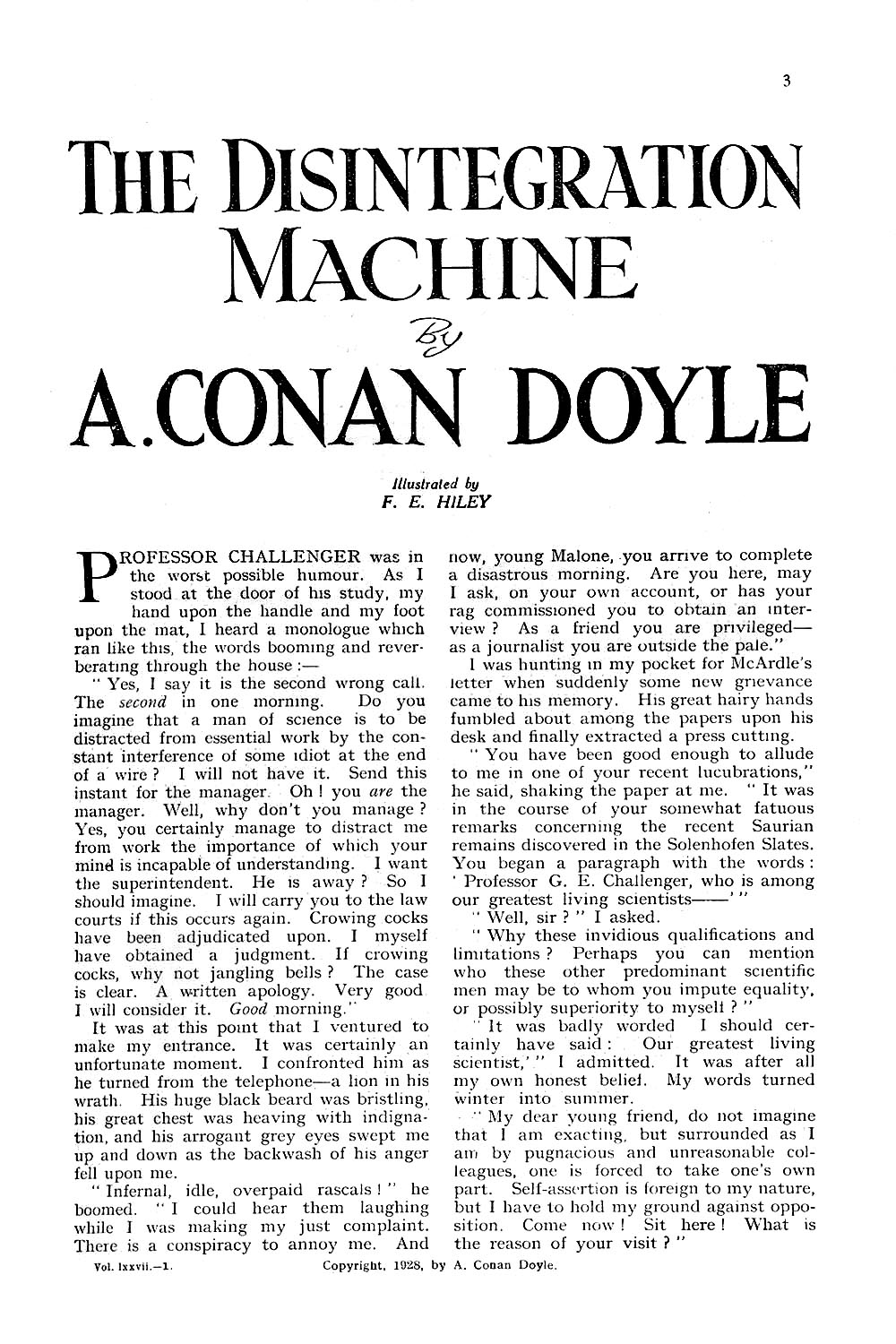
- Country: United Kingdom
- Language: English
- Genre: Science fiction

Publication
- Publication date: 1929

Chronology
- Series: Professor Challenger
When the World Screamed	—

"The Disintegration Machine" is a science fiction short story by British writer Arthur Conan Doyle. It was first published in The Strand Magazine in January 1929. The story centres on the discovery of a machine capable of disintegrating objects and reforming them as they were. This short story is a part of the "Challenger series", a collection of stories about the wealthy eccentric adventurer Professor Challenger.

== Plot summary ==
Professor Challenger, a big burly man, is arguing with people who are persistently calling him on the telephone when his young friend Malone, a reporter for The Daily Gazette, enters and requests Challenger accompany him to inspect the discovery of Theodore Nemor, who claims to have invented a machine capable of disintegrating objects. Skeptical of the invention, Challenger accepts Malone's proposal and accompanies him to the house of Nemor.

At first Nemor offers to disintegrate Challenger and put him back together to demonstrate the machine, but Malone convinces Challenger that should the machine fail to restore him, his scientific work would go unfinished, and thus Malone nominates himself to be disintegrated.

Malone is successfully disintegrated and put back together and Challenger then undergoes the same treatment. As punishment for Challenger's lack of faith in the invention and lack of courtesy to Nemor, the inventor restores the professor without any hair. In a fury, Challenger assaults Nemor, throws him to the floor and threatens his life should he not restore the professor to his previous state. Nemor restores Challenger's hair and Challenger congratulates him on his machine and inquires as to its practical application. Nemor boasts that in the hands of the Russians, who were the highest bidder for the rights to the invention, London and its millions of inhabitants could be destroyed.

After ascertaining whether any others know the secret of the machine, Challenger inspects it. Challenger claims that a small amount of electricity is leaking from the chair on which he sat when he was disintegrated. Nemor refutes this and sits himself in the chair in an attempt to feel this electricity. Challenger then disintegrates him and, considering it is for the greater good, he and Malone leave without restoring Nemor.

== See also ==
- 1929 in science fiction
