= Nicholas Nye =

1931 poem by Walter de la Mare

- by Walter De la Mare
- Country: Great Britain
- Language: English
- Subject: Memories
- Publisher: Walter de la mare
- Publication date: 1931
- Lines: 40

Nicholas Nye is a poem by British poet Walter de la Mare. It first appeared in 1913 when it was published in the collection Peacock Pie. In 1927 it was included in the anthology Poetry's Plea for Animals. It has a total of 40 lines. It is written for children aged around 9–10 years. It is a six stanza poem in which the poet is the first person from view and visits an orchard and finds a donkey named 'Nicholas Nye'. He observes and describes the donkey and discovers that he and the donkey are very similar. He explains the miseries and difficulties the donkey has to face for example being unwanted and alone.
