= Forgotten Futures II: The Log of the Astronef =

Forgotten Futures II: The Log of the Astronef is a 1994 role-playing game supplement designed by Marcus L. Rowland.

== Contents ==
Forgotten Futures II: The Log of the Astronef is a supplement in which a Victorian and Edwardian science fiction role-playing game is based on George Griffith's "Stories of Other Worlds." The game includes the complete rulebook, the original stories, a detailed worldbook, and a full campaign. It spans over 400 pages and features 31 illustrations—some from Pearson's Magazine, others crafted by Rowland himself—alongside Lotus 1-2-3 templates for spaceship design and currency conversion. The narrative centers on Rollo Lenox Smeaton Aubrey, Earl of Redgrave, who invents antigravity in 1901 and builds a spaceship, the Astronef, to explore the solar system with his American wife. Each planet offers distinct cultures and challenges: Mars hosts warlike humanoids, Venus is home to peaceful avians, and Ganymede boasts advanced technology. The worldbook extrapolates what Earth might look like by 1920 under such conditions, blending historical detail with speculative fiction. The campaign, Masters of the Graviton, includes five adventures ranging from lunar archaeology to airship competitions and villainous plots. The rules are streamlined, using three core stats—Mind, Body, and Soul—and broad skill categories like "Scientist" and "Marksman." The game also provides guidance on writing adventures and includes stats for genre-appropriate NPCs, including Sherlock Holmes.

== Publication history ==
Forgotten Futures II: The Log of the Astronef was distributed digitally as ASCII text and GIF images and available via FTP.

== Reception ==
Ken & Jo Walton reviewed Forgotten Futures II: The Log of the Astronef for Pyramid magazine and stated that "This an excellent, atmospheric, roleplaying game, made slightly unapproachable by its unusual distribution method. It is available only on disk; you unzip the file and print out the book for yourself. All text files are ASCII format, all pictures are GIFs. If you haven't got a Babbage Engine, find someone who has, and persuade them to print it out for you. This may be the wave of the future for individual writers and small companies wishing to produce good quality but uncommercial games. Or it may just be an anomaly. But don't be put off from an excellent game just because it has no cover art and is only 3.5 inches square!"

== Reviews ==
- Anduin (Issue 78 - Nov 2002)
