= The Lost World (1925 film) =

1925 silent film by Harry O. Hoyt

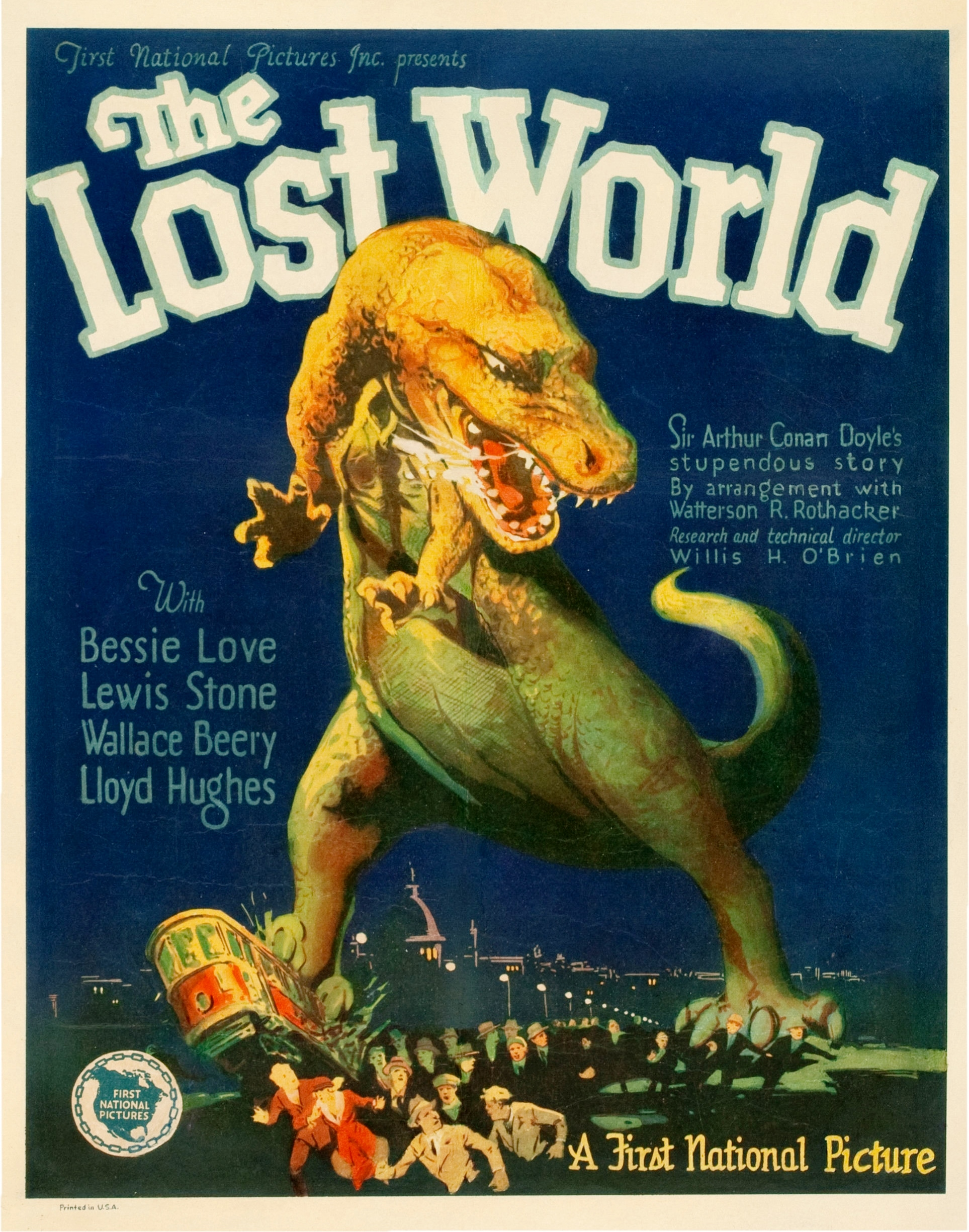
- Theatrical release poster
- Directed by: Harry O. Hoyt
- Screenplay by: Marion Fairfax
- Based on: The Lost World (1912 novel) by Arthur Conan Doyle
- Produced by: Earl Hudson
- Starring: Bessie Love; Lewis Stone; Wallace Beery; Lloyd Hughes
- Cinematography: Arthur Edeson
- Edited by: George McGuire
- Production company: First National Pictures
- Distributed by: First National Pictures
- Release date: February 8, 1925
- Running time: 106 minutes
- Country: United States
- Language: Silent (English intertitles)
- Budget: $700,000
- Box office: $1.3 million

The Lost World (1925)

The Lost World is a 1925 American silent fantasy giant monster adventure film, directed by Harry O. Hoyt and written by Marion Fairfax, adapted from Arthur Conan Doyle's 1912 novel of the same name.

Produced and distributed by First National Pictures, a major Hollywood studio at the time, the film stars Wallace Beery as Professor Challenger and features pioneering stop motion special effects by Willis O'Brien, a forerunner of his work on King Kong (1933). Conan Doyle appears in a frontispiece to the film, absent from some extant prints.

In 1998, The Lost World was deemed "culturally, historically or aesthetically significant" by the Library of Congress and selected for preservation in the United States National Film Registry. Due to U.S. public domain laws, the film is now in the public domain.

== Plot ==
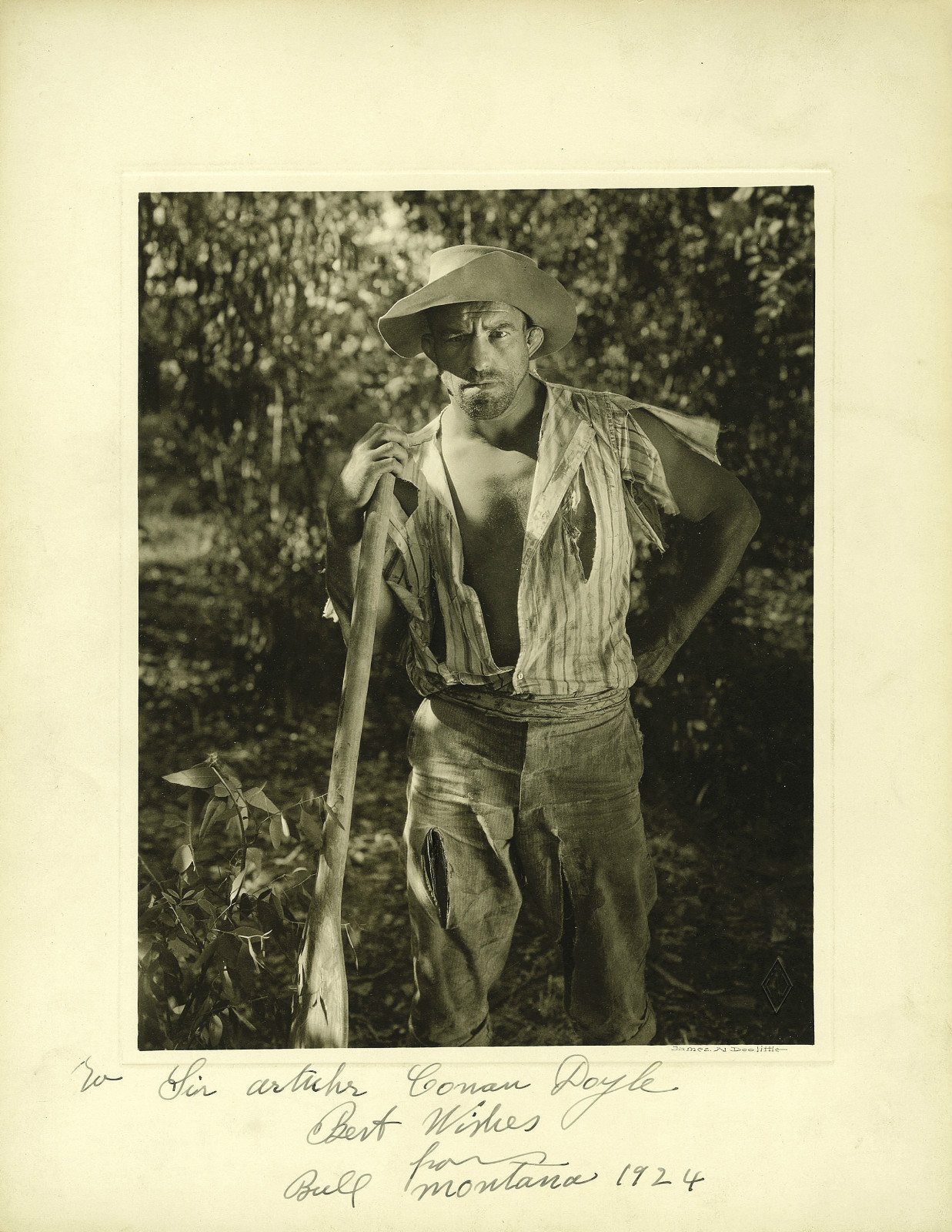
Montana Inscribed Photo to Doyle

From a lost expedition to a plateau in the Amazon basin, Paula White brings the journal of her father, explorer Maple White, to the eccentric Professor Challenger in London. The journal features sketches of dinosaurs which is enough proof for Challenger to publicly announce that dinosaurs still walk the earth. Met with ridicule, Challenger reluctantly accepts a newspaper's offer to finance a mission to rescue Maple White. Professor Challenger, Paula White, sportsman Sir John Roxton, news reporter Edward Malone (who wishes to go in order to impress his fiancée), skeptical professor Summerlee, Indian servant Zambo, and Challenger's butler Austin leave for the plateau.

At their campsite at the base of the plateau, the explorers are shocked when a large rock falls, sent their way by an Apeman perched on top of an overhead ledge. As the crew look up to see their attacker, Challenger spies overhead a Pteranodon eating a young Toxodon which proves that the statements in Maple White's diary are true. Leaving Zambo and Austin at the camp, they cross a chasm onto the plateau by cutting down a tree and using it as a bridge, but it is knocked over by a Brontosaurus, leaving them trapped.

The explorers witness various life-and-death struggles between the prehistoric beasts of the plateau. An Allosaurus makes its way to the campsite and attacks the exploration party. It is finally driven off by Ed who tosses a torch into its mouth. Convinced that the camp is not safe, Ed climbs a tree to look for a new location, but is attacked by the apeman. Roxton succeeds in shooting the apeman, but the creature is merely wounded and escapes before he can finish him off.

The explorers then make preparations to live on the plateau potentially indefinitely. During a search for Maple White, Roxton finds his remains, confirming his death. It is at this time that Ed confesses his love for Paula and the two declare their intention to be wed by Summerlee who used to be a minister.

Soon afterwards, a volcano erupts causing a mass stampede among the giant creatures of the lost world. The crew is saved when Paula's pet monkey Jocko climbs up the plateau carrying a rope. The crew use the rope to pull up a rope ladder constructed by Zambo and Austin and then climb down.

As Ed makes his descent, he is again attacked by the apeman who pulls the rope ladder. The apeman is again shot and finally killed by Roxton. They discover the Brontosaurus, which had fallen off the plateau and landed softly in a mud bank, trapped but still alive, and Challenger manages to bring it back to London, as he wants to put it on display as proof of his story.

However, while being unloaded from the ship, the spooked and disoriented animal escapes and causes havoc until it reaches Tower Bridge, where its massive weight causes a collapse, and it swims down the River Thames. Challenger is morose as the creature leaves. Ed discovers that the love he left in London has married in his absence, allowing him and Paula to be together. Roxton morosely but gallantly hides his love for Paula as Paula and Ed leave together, while two passersby note: "That's Sir John Roxton – sportsman."

== Cast ==
- Sir Arthur Conan Doyle as himself (appears in a frontispiece to the film, missing from some prints)
- Bessie Love as Paula White
- Lewis Stone as Sir John Roxton
- Lloyd Hughes as Edward Malone
- Wallace Beery as Professor Challenger
- Arthur Hoyt as Professor Summerlee
- Alma Bennett as Gladys Hungerford
- Virginia Brown Faire as Marquette the half-caste girl (uncredited)
- Bull Montana as Apeman/Gomez
- Francis Finch-Smiles as Austin
- Jules Cowles as Zambo
- Margaret McWade as Mrs. Challenger
- George Bunny as Colin McArdle
- Charles Wellesley as Major Hibbard
- Nelson MacDowell as Attorney (uncredited)
- Chrispin Martin as Bearer/Cannibal (scenes deleted)
- Jocko the monkey as himself
- Mary the chimpanzee as herself (uncredited)

== Production ==
This was the first feature-length film made in the United States, possibly the world, to feature model animation as the primary special effect, or stop motion animation in general. Willis H. O'Brien had previously, in 1918, worked on a film called The Ghost of Slumber Mountain that used stop motion photography. In The Lost World, he combined animated dinosaurs with live-action footage of human beings, but at first he was able to do this only by separating the frame into two parts (also known as split screen). As work went on, O'Brien's technique grew better and he could combine live-action and stop-motion footage in the same part of the screen.

For the live action scenes, an open sewer behind the MGM studio in Los Angeles was used as a river.

The dinosaurs of this film were based on the artwork of Charles R. Knight. Some of the dinosaur models used in the film came into the possession of collector Forrest J Ackerman.

Doyle frequently mentioned that Professor Challenger, not Sherlock Holmes, was his favorite character among his creations.

== Reception ==
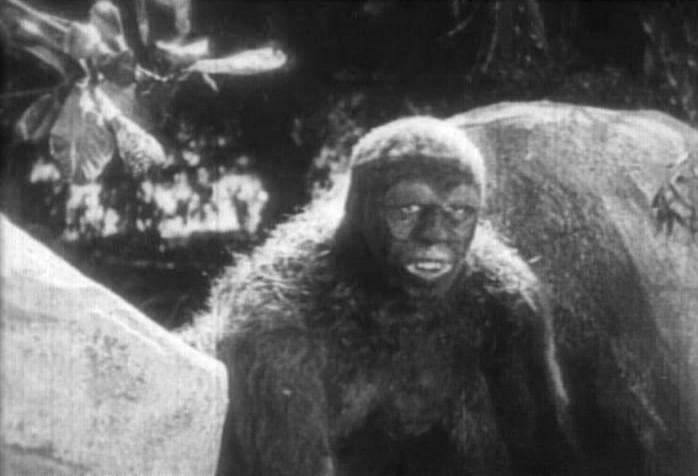
The infamous clip from the film featuring the apeman looking back, which would become a running gag in the adult animated "reality" television series Drawn Together.

The Lost World received acclaim. It holds a 100% score on review aggregator website Rotten Tomatoes, based on 18 reviews and an average rating of 7.5/10.

In 1922, Conan Doyle screened O'Brien's test reel to a meeting of the Society of American Magicians, which included Harry Houdini. The astounded audience watched footage of a Triceratops family, an attack by an Allosaurus and some Stegosaurus footage. Doyle refused to discuss the film's origins. On the next day, The New York Times ran a front-page article about it, saying "(Conan Doyle's) monsters of the ancient world, or of the new world which he has discovered in the ether, were extraordinarily lifelike. If fakes, they were masterpieces".

The film received its world premiere at the Astor Theatre in New York City on February 8, 1925. In April 1925, on a London-Paris flight by Imperial Airways, The Lost World became the first film to be shown to airline passengers. As film stock of the era was nitrate and highly flammable, this was a risky undertaking on a wood and fabric-hulled plane such as this converted First World War bomber, the Handley-Page O 400.

This is the first dinosaur-oriented film hit, and it led to other dinosaur films, from King Kong to the Jurassic Park series. Michael Crichton's sequel to Jurassic Park was named The Lost World, in homage to Doyle's novel and film.

James Lowder reviewed The Lost World in White Wolf Inphobia #56 (June, 1995), rating it a 4 out of 5 and stated that "The real stars of The Lost World are O'Brien's dinosaurs. The stampede scene, complete with an exploding volcano, is terrific. The film's most lasting legacy originates in the brilliant 'brontosaurus rampage' sequence that closes the film [...] It's impossible to watch the stop-motion beast stomp the city and not recognize its influence on later monster epics."

=== American Film Institute recognition ===
- AFI's 100 Years...100 Thrills – Nominated
- AFI's 10 Top 10 – Nominated Fantasy Film

== Restorations ==
- George Eastman House – 1997 Laserdisc preservation with stills showing missing scenes
- George Eastman House – Film restoration using materials from Czech National Film Archive. Some sequences still missing and some inadvertently left out
- David Shepard, Serge Bromberg – DVD version using Kodascope prints, Czech archive materials and trailers. Like the George Eastman House restoration, some sequences are still missing and some inadvertently left out
- Flicker Alley – Blu-ray version of new 2K restoration (from various sources – original 35 mm nitrate copy, safety print, various 16 mm copies, etc.) with around eight min. of recently discovered footage and a new full orchestra score by Robert Israel (produced by Serge Bromberg of Lobster Films and dedicated to David Shepard of Film Preservation Associates)

== Copyright ==
The Lost World entered the public domain on January 1, 1954, after 28 years of protection plus the remainder of the final calendar year. Although 95 years of protection was possible for works published in 1925, protection beyond 28 years required, at the time, a renewal with the US copyright office during the 28th year. The film's copyright was not renewed.

Any elements unreleased in 1925, and unreleased during the lifetime of the producer, have 70 years of copyright protection after the death of the producer. Producer Earl Hudson died in 1959, so any such film elements will enter the public domain on January 1, 2030.

== See also ==
- List of films featuring dinosaurs
- List of stop-motion films
- List of rediscovered films
- List of incomplete or partially lost films

== Bibliography ==
- Gilberto Neri, Silent Dinosaurs. Prehistoric Creatures in Early Cinema, 2026, pp. 167, ISBN 979-8180737540
