= The Poison Belt =

1913 novella by Arthur Conan Doyle

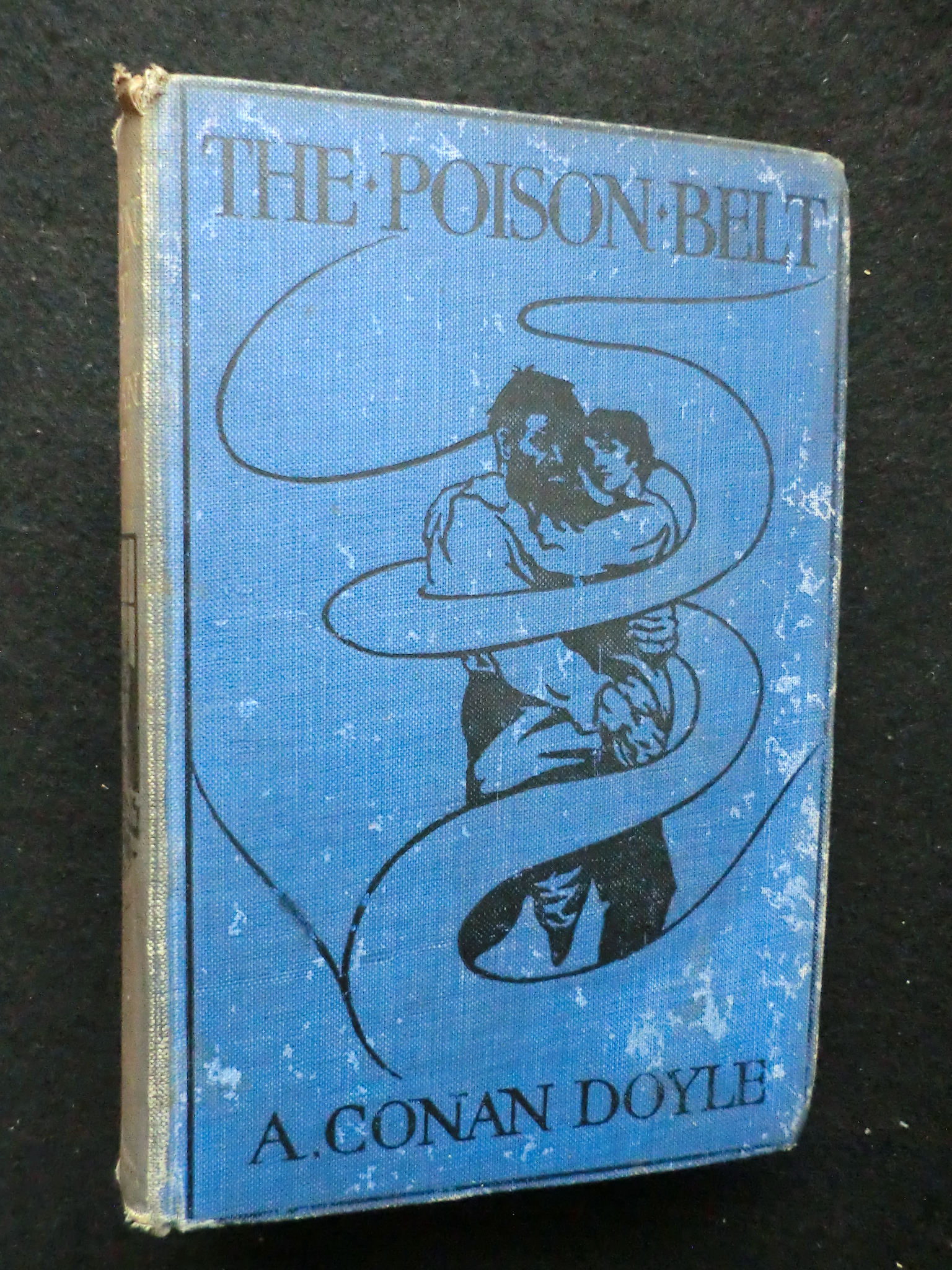
- Cover of the first edition of The Poison Belt
- Author: Arthur Conan Doyle
- Illustrator: Harry Rountree
- Language: English
- Series: Professor Challenger
- Genre: Science fiction
- Publisher: Hodder & Stoughton
- Publication date: 1913
- Publication place: United Kingdom
- Media type: Print (hardback)
- Pages: 199
- Preceded by: The Lost World
- Followed by: The Land of Mist

The Poison Belt is a science fiction novella by British writer Arthur Conan Doyle, the second book about Professor Challenger. Written in 1913, much of it takes place in a single room in Challenger's house in Sussex. This would be the last story written about Challenger until the 1920s, by which time Doyle's spiritualist beliefs had begun to influence his writing.

== Plot summary ==
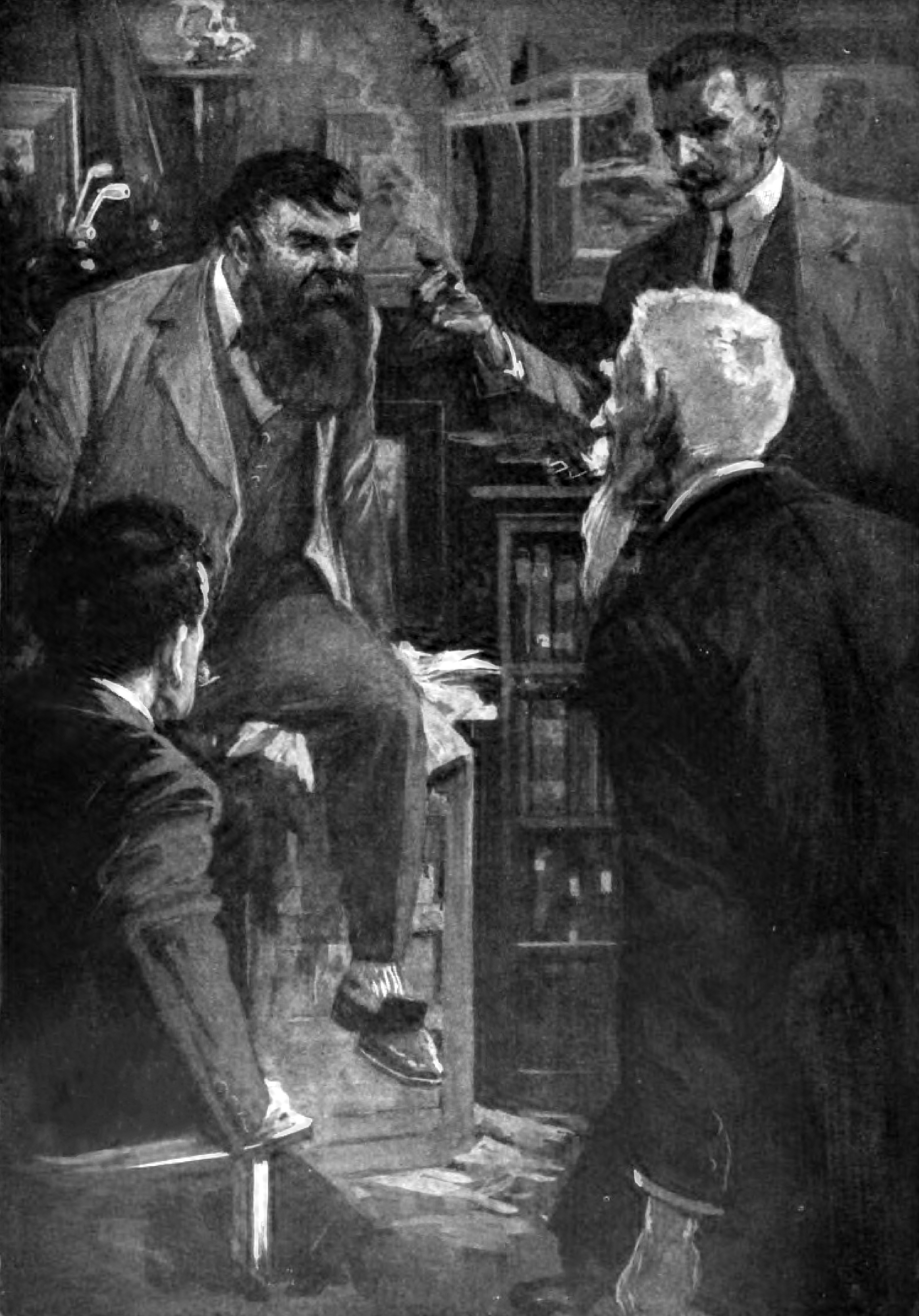
Illustration of The Poison Belt in The Strand Magazine (March 1913)

Challenger sends telegrams asking his three companions from The Lost World—Edward Malone, Lord John Roxton, and Professor Summerlee—to join him at his home outside London, and instructs each of them to 'bring oxygen'. During their journey there, they see people's behaviour become excitable and erratic. On arrival, they are ushered into a sealed room, along with Challenger and his wife. In the course of his research into various phenomena, Challenger has predicted that the Earth is moving into a belt of poisonous ether which, based on its effect on the people of Sumatra earlier in the day, he expects to stifle humanity. Challenger seals them in the room with cylinders of oxygen, which he (correctly) believes will counter the effect of the ether.

Cover of a later printing of the Arthur Conan Doyle novella The Poison Belt

The five wait out the Earth's passage through the poison belt as they watch the world outside, human and animal, die and machines run amok. (Challenger's servants are left outside the sealed room, and they continue to perform their duties until the ether overtakes them.) Finally, the last of the oxygen cylinders are emptied, and they open a window, ready to face death. To their surprise, they do not die and conclude the Earth has now passed through the poison belt. They journey through the dead countryside in Challenger's car, finally arriving in London. They encounter only one survivor, an elderly, bed-ridden woman prescribed oxygen for her health.

After returning to Challenger's house, they discover that the effect of the ether is temporary, with it instead acting like an anaesthetic. Everyone who had seemingly died from the poison during the incident awakens with no memory of what had happened. Eventually, Challenger and his companions manage to convince the world what happened—a task made easier by the tremendous amount of death and destruction caused by runaway machines and fires that took place while the world was asleep. Shocked by what has taken place, humanity places a greater value on life.

== Dramatic adaptations ==
The BBC aired a radio drama version of the story in 1944, as a sequel to their well-received adaptation of The Lost World that spring.

A five-part reading was dramatised over the Christmas period on BBC Radio 4 in 1983. It was read by Peter Pacey.

An audio recording of The Poison Belt, recorded by Mark F. Smith, is available on the Internet Archive.
