= The Lost World (Doyle novel) =

1912 novel by Arthur Conan Doyle

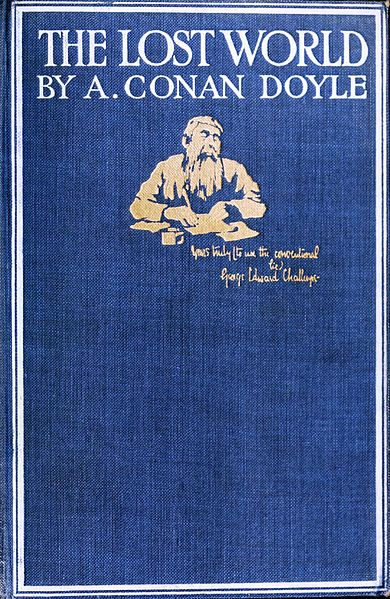
- Cover of the first edition of The Lost World
- Author: Sir Arthur Conan Doyle
- Language: English
- Series: Professor Challenger
- Genre: Adventure, Science fiction, Lost world
- Publisher: Hodder & Stoughton
- Publication date: 1912
- Publication place: United Kingdom
- Media type: Print
- Pages: 280
- Followed by: The Poison Belt
- Text: The Lost World at Wikisource

The Lost World is an adventure and science fiction novel by British writer Sir Arthur Conan Doyle recounting an expedition to a remote plateau in the Amazon basin of South America where dinosaurs and other prehistoric animals still survive, along with a tribe of vicious ape-like creatures that are in conflict with a group of indigenous Indians. The work introduces the character of Professor Challenger, who leads the expedition (and who would appear in later Conan Doyle stories), and is narrated in the first person by the journalist member (Edward Malone) of the exploration party. The Lost World appeared in serial form in the Strand Magazine, illustrated by New-Zealand-born artist Harry Rountree, during the months of April to November 1912 and also was serialized in magazines in the United States from March to November 1912. Hodder & Stoughton published the first book edition in October 1912 in Great Britain (London), with printings as well in the United States (New York) and in Canada (Toronto).

When he was working on The Lost World, Doyle explained to his editor Herbert Greenhough Smith: "My ambition is to do for the boys' book what Sherlock Holmes did for the detective story". Doyle cast the novel in the mode of the popular 19th century "boy’s adventure story" genre of Robert Louis Stevenson and H. Rider Haggard, but written to appeal to adults as well, as declared in his opening epigraph:

I have wrought my simple plan
If I give one hour of joy
To the boy who’s half a man,
Or the man who’s half a boy.

In developing the novel, Doyle drew on factual sources such as zoologist Ray Lankester's book Extinct Animals and the accounts of explorers, most notably his friend Percy Fawcett. He also took direct inspiration from earlier fictional works by Jules Verne (in particular, Journey to the Center of the Earth, in which humans encounter prehistoric creatures living deep inside the planet), and British adventure fantasies about finding lost kingdoms and mysterious ancient civilizations in faraway locations such as Haggard's King Solomon's Mines and She: A History of Adventure. Adding to the mix, Doyle skillfully integrated humor into the story, satirizing, among other things, academic rivalries and sensational journalism—including a Foreword announcing withdrawal of a supposed injunction and libel suit against publication of the book by Professor Challenger.

The public success of The Lost World (which was translated into multiple languages soon after), boosted by the popularity of the silent motion picture version from 1925, led to the term "lost world" being extended to an entire subgenre of earlier and later adventure, fantasy, and science fiction works set in distant or hidden locations where ancient creatures, races, or civilizations continue to exist in modern times. The Lost World is widely considered one of Conan Doyle’s best novels for its exciting narrative, imaginative setting, and vivid characters, setting a standard for similar later adventure stories. It has never been out of print.

== Plot summary ==
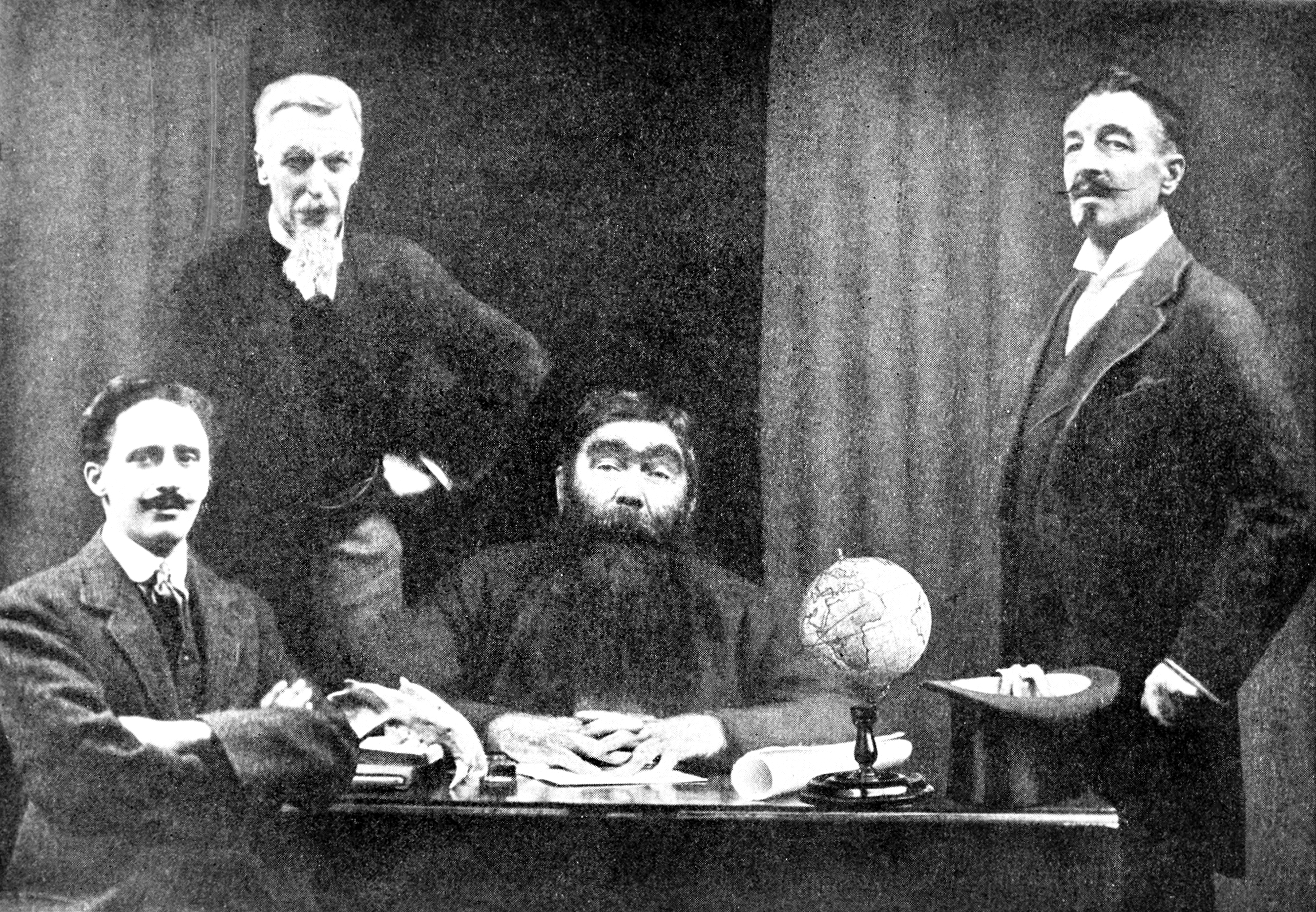
Frontispiece photo from the 1912 edition of The Lost World, showing the fictional members of the expedition, left to right: E. D. Malone; Professor Summerlee; Professor G. E. Challenger; Lord John Roxton (Challenger was impersonated by Conan Doyle himself)

Edward Malone, a young reporter for the Daily Gazette, asks his editor for a dangerous assignment to impress the woman he loves, Gladys, who wishes for a great man capable of brave deeds and actions. His task is to approach the notorious Professor Challenger. The subject is to be his recent South American expedition which is surrounded by controversy. Malone masquerades as an earnest student to get in with the professor. However, Challenger sees through the masquerade, and after confirming Malone’s scientific knowledge is non-existent, erupts in anger and forcibly throws him out.

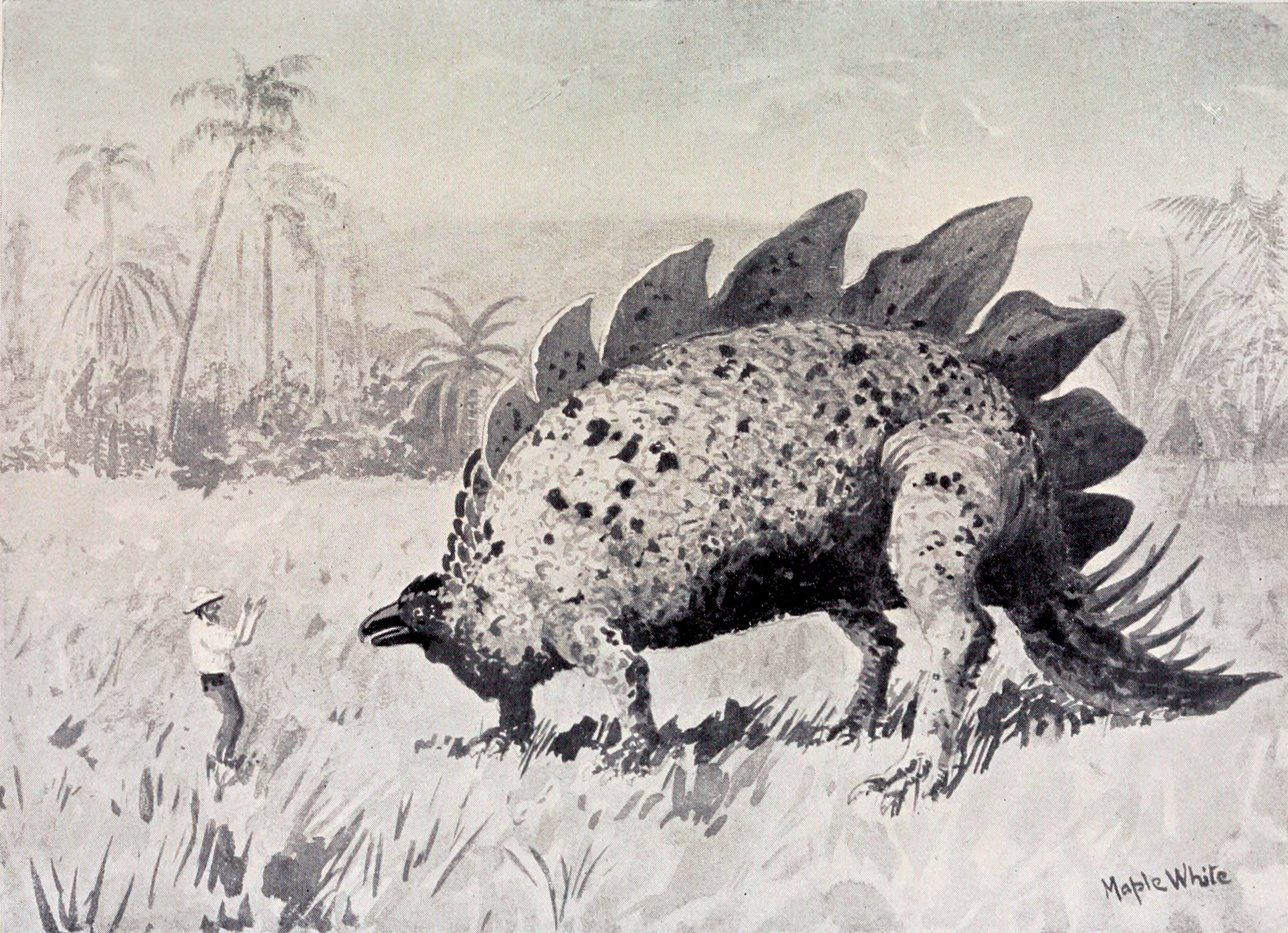
Maple White's sketch of a living Stegosaurus

However, Malone earns his respect by refusing to press charges with a policeman who saw his violent ejection into the street. Challenger ushers him back inside and, extracting promises of confidentiality, eventually reveals he has discovered living dinosaurs in South America, following up an expedition by a now-deceased previous American explorer named Maple White. At a tumultuous public meeting in which Challenger experiences further ridicule (most notably from a professional rival, Professor Summerlee), Malone volunteers for an expedition to verify the discoveries. His companions are to be Professor Summerlee, and Lord John Roxton, an adventurous hunter who helped end slavery on the Amazon; the notches on his rifle showing how many slavers he killed doing so.

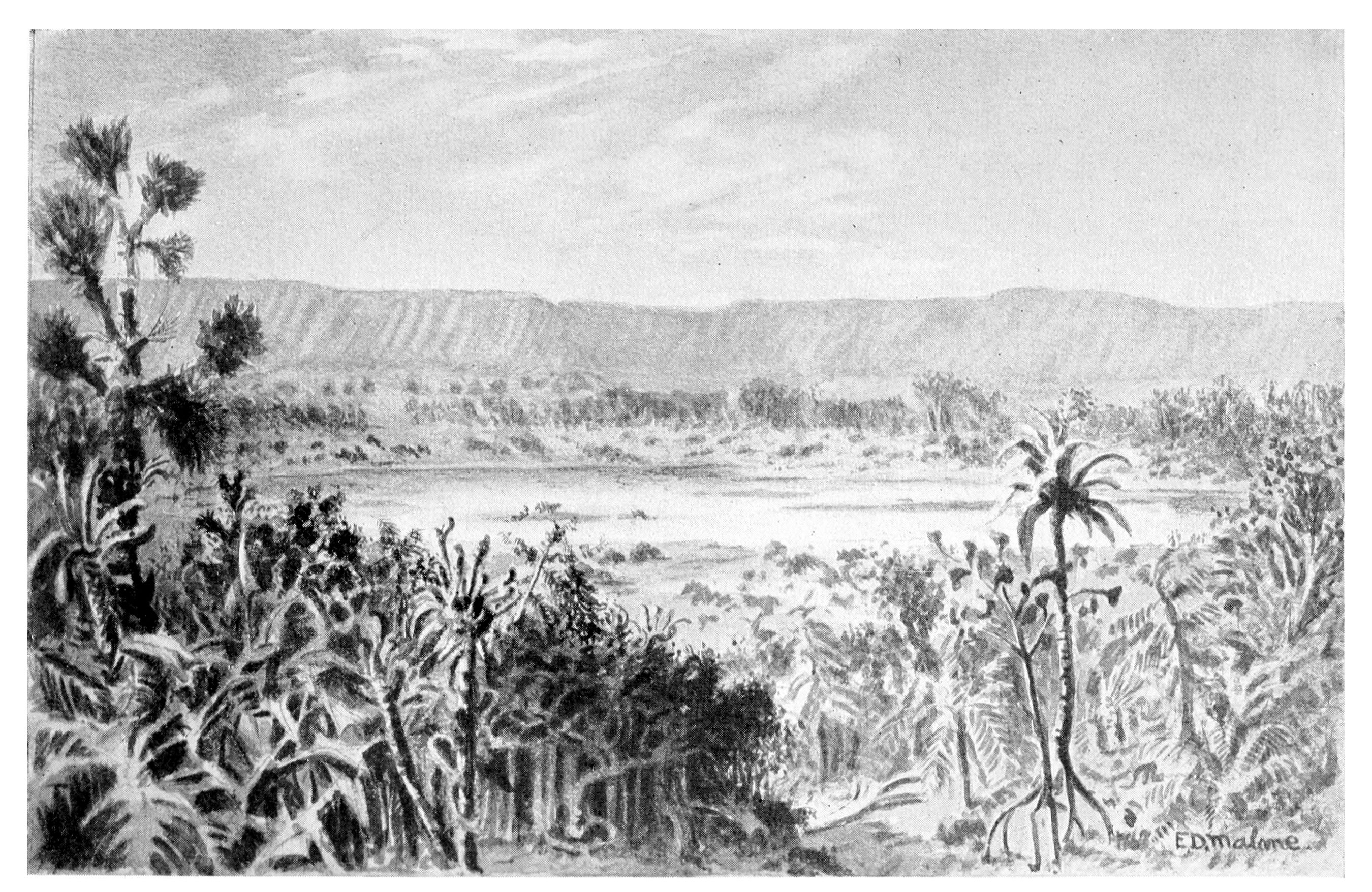
View of the plateau that isolates the lost world

Running the gauntlet of hostile tribes, the expedition finally reaches the lost world with the aid of indigenous guides, who are superstitiously scared of the area. Summerlee retains his arrogance and his skepticism, until a pterodactyl flies down and is seen by all at close range, as it steals the companions’ dinner. After this, Summerlee apologises to Challenger.

A pterodactyl steals the explorers' dinner, illustration from French serial version, 1914

The group explores the entire base of the plateau to find a way to the top and discover that a former route up is now blocked by a rock slide. They also encounter human bones at one spot at the base of the cliff, identified as James Colver, Maple White’s companion, who, it would seem, somehow fell to his death. With the cliffs to the plateau apparently unscalable, an adjacent pinnacle is climbable but separated by a wide gap. Challenger determines that a tall tree on the pinnacle can be cut down and used as a bridge, which allows the four explorers to cross over to the plateau. However, they are almost immediately trapped on the other side, thanks to the treachery of one of their hired porters, Gomez—who, as it turns out, is a former slaver whose brother had previously been killed by Roxton during his anti-slavery activities. He takes his revenge by dropping the tree off the cliff, stranding the explorers on the plateau. Roxton shoots and kills Gomez, and the other guide is subsequently killed by another porter, a formerly enslaved black man named Zambo, who remains loyal to the party: but the latter is unable to do much more to help, other than send some of the company's supplies over by rope.

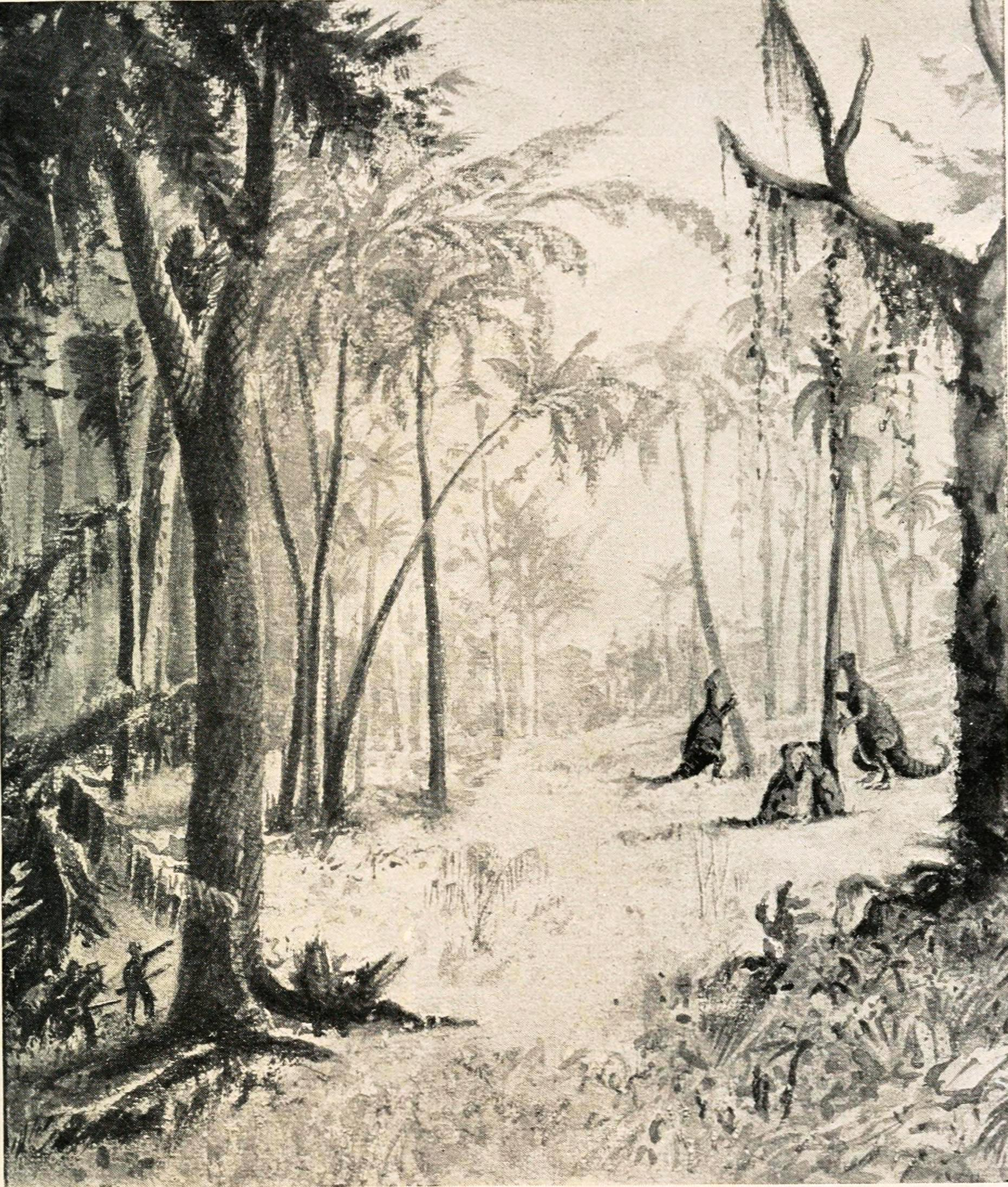
The group encountering Iguanodon

The explorers investigate the wonders of the lost world, finding a herd of Iguanodons in a glade. They narrowly escape an attack from pterodactyls after the party comes upon a rookery around a swampy pit in a former volcanic blow-hole. Although barely escaping with their lives, Roxton takes great interest in nearby blue clay deposits.

Pterodactyls attack the explorers, illustration from French serial version, 1914

At night a ferocious theropod is about to break through the protective fence of thorn bushes built around their camp; Roxton averts disaster by bravely dashing at it, thrusting a blazing torch at its face to scare it away.

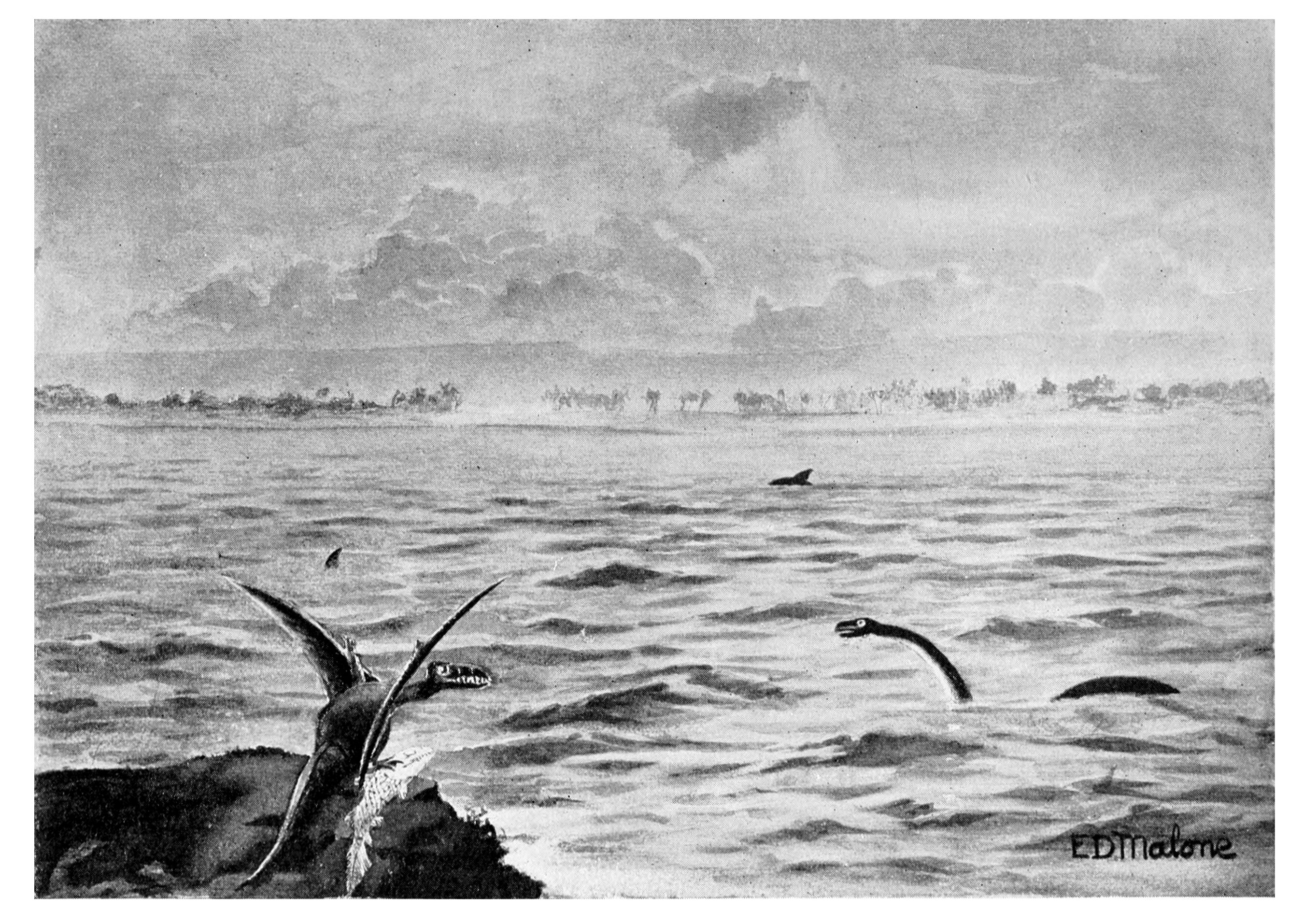
The central lake on the plateau

The night after, Malone ventures out alone and studies fauna near the central lake; including Glyptodons, Irish elks, and a Stegosaurus. He barely escapes a Megalosaurus and falls into a deep pit dug to trap and impale animals while running in the dark; proof of humans on the plateau.

Professor Challenger's life spared because of his resemblance to the king of the ape-men, illustration from French serial version, 1914

After climbing out of the pit, Malone returns to the camp to find the others missing and signs of a violent attack. The following morning, Roxton arrives after escaping the race of "ape-men" that captured the party on the night that Malone visited the central lake. While in captivity, they discovered that a tribe of indigenous people, with whom the "ape-men" are at war, inhabit the other side of the plateau.

Roxton and Malone take their rifles to mount a rescue. They arrive at the village of the ape-men and see an Indian hurled off the cliff to the delight of the hairy creatures. Professor Challenger apparently enjoys special status as a captive because of his physical resemblance to the king of the ape-men, and tries in vain to save Summerlee from a similar death. Lord Roxton shoots the king dead at the start of the rescue attack, and he and Malone fire repeatedly, preventing the ape-men from throwing Summerlee and the remaining captured tribe members over the edge.

One of the saved Indians is a young prince of the tribe and the surviving tribe members take the party back to their village. With the help of the explorers’ firepower, they return to defeat the "ape-men", slaughtering all the adult males, with most being driven off the cliff. After witnessing the power of their guns, the tribe wishes to keep the explorers on the plateau. During their time with the tribe, Roxton plans how to capture a pterodactyl chick at Challenger's request, using a protective wooden cage against the adult pterodactyls. Wanting to leave and return to civilization, the explorers are helped by the young prince they saved, who gives them a crude map of the caves in the hillside near the tribe. With the map, the explorers are able to find a tunnel leading back to the outside world. They escape by night, descending on a rope.

Upon return to England, many detractors continue to dismiss the expedition's account, until, at a public meeting at Queen's Hall Challenger produces the young pterodactyl as proof, transfixing the audience and leaving them in no doubt of the truth. The explorers are instantly feted as heroes, and on a wave of adulation find themselves carried shoulder-high from the hall by cheering crowds. The pterodactyl, in the confusion, makes its escape and is witnessed several times at different locations around London, causing consternation wherever it goes, but is last seen heading off to the southwest in the probable direction of its home.

At a private celebratory dinner, Roxton reveals to the others that the blue clay contained diamonds. He had been tipped off to the possibility, by the recollection of a similar feature in South Africa, and managed to extract about £200,000 worth (£23 million in 2021), which is to be split between them. Challenger plans to open a private museum with his share. Summerlee plans to retire and categorise fossils. Malone returns to his love, Gladys, hoping she will recognise his achievements. Instead, he finds she has now changed her mind and married a very ordinary man instead, an insignificant clerk. Astonished at this turn of events, and with nothing to keep him in London, he decides to accompany Roxton back to the lost world, which the explorers earlier had named "Maple White Land" in honour of the American who found it.

== Characters ==
- Professor George Edward Challenger – An energetic British zoologist with a volatile temper; his hairy, burly body and his thick beard are a source of humor in the story, including a resemblance to the king of the ape-men, who treats him like a brother after he is captured
- Edward D. Malone – A reporter at the Daily Gazette of Irish background; an athletic rugby player
- McArdle – Malone's editor at the Daily Gazette
- Professor Summerlee – An older British zoologist who is skeptical of Challenger’s claims
- Lord John Roxton – A widely traveled adventurer and skilled big-game hunter, an opponent of slavery
- Gomez – Brother to an enslaver whom Roxton killed
- Manuel – Gomez's friend
- Zambo – South American black man loyal to the explorers
- Gladys Hungerton – Edward Malone's love interest
- Jessie Challenger – Challenger's wife, who objects to his belligerent behavior
- Maple White – Deceased explorer who discovered the lost world
- The Accala Indians – The native human inhabitants of the lost world plateau

== Prehistoric animals encountered ==
- Iguanodon – large plant-eating dinosaurs: "they looked like monstrous kangaroos, twenty feet in length, and with skins like black crocodiles"; treated like cattle by the tribe of Indians living on the plateau.
- Unidentified theropod – large meat-eating dinosaurs: Challenger and Summerlee debate if they are Megalosaurus or Allosaurus; oddly described as "In shape they were like horrible toads, and moved in a succession of springs, but in size they were of an incredible bulk, larger than the largest elephant"; their "blotched and warty skins were of a curious fish-like iridescence."
- Stegosaurus – armoured plant-eating dinosaur, sketched by Maple White in his notebook, sighted by Malone near the lake at night.
- Pterodactyls – pterosaurs or flying reptiles; Challenger and Summerlee debate if they were Pterodactylus or Dimorphodon.
- Plesiosaurus – long-necked swimming reptile seen on the shore of the lake, much to Summerlee's delight
- Ichthyosaurus – fish-like aquatic reptile caught in a net in the lake by the tribe.
- Megaloceros – described as a huge deer resembling the "Irish elk" but without using a scientific name.
- Glyptodon – described as like large armadillos, but without using a scientific name.
- Toxodon – described as a "giant ten-foot guinea pig, with projecting chisel teeth."
- Smilodon – mentioned to be a possible candidate for the attack of the Iguanodon.
- Phorusrhacos – a giant flightless predatory bird called "phororacos" that chases and attacks Challenger; killed by Lord Roxton, who takes the skull as a trophy.
- Giant snake – described as a giant 50-foot snake in the central lake, large enough to snatch a human off the boat in a single strike, but without a scientific name.
- Ape-men – anthropoid apes covered in reddish hair, described as "an advance upon the pithecanthropus of Java, and as coming therefore nearer than any known form to that hypothetical creation, the missing link."

== References in other works ==
In addition to lending its title to this subgenre, the title of Doyle's work was reused by Michael Crichton in his 1995 novel The Lost World, a sequel to Jurassic Park, and its film adaptation, The Lost World: Jurassic Park.

Greg Bear's 1998 novel Dinosaur Summer is a sequel to The Lost World, set in an alternate history 1947. In the context of Bear's novel, The Lost World was a nonfiction work published by Doyle as recounted to him by Professor Challenger.

== References to actual history, geography and current science ==
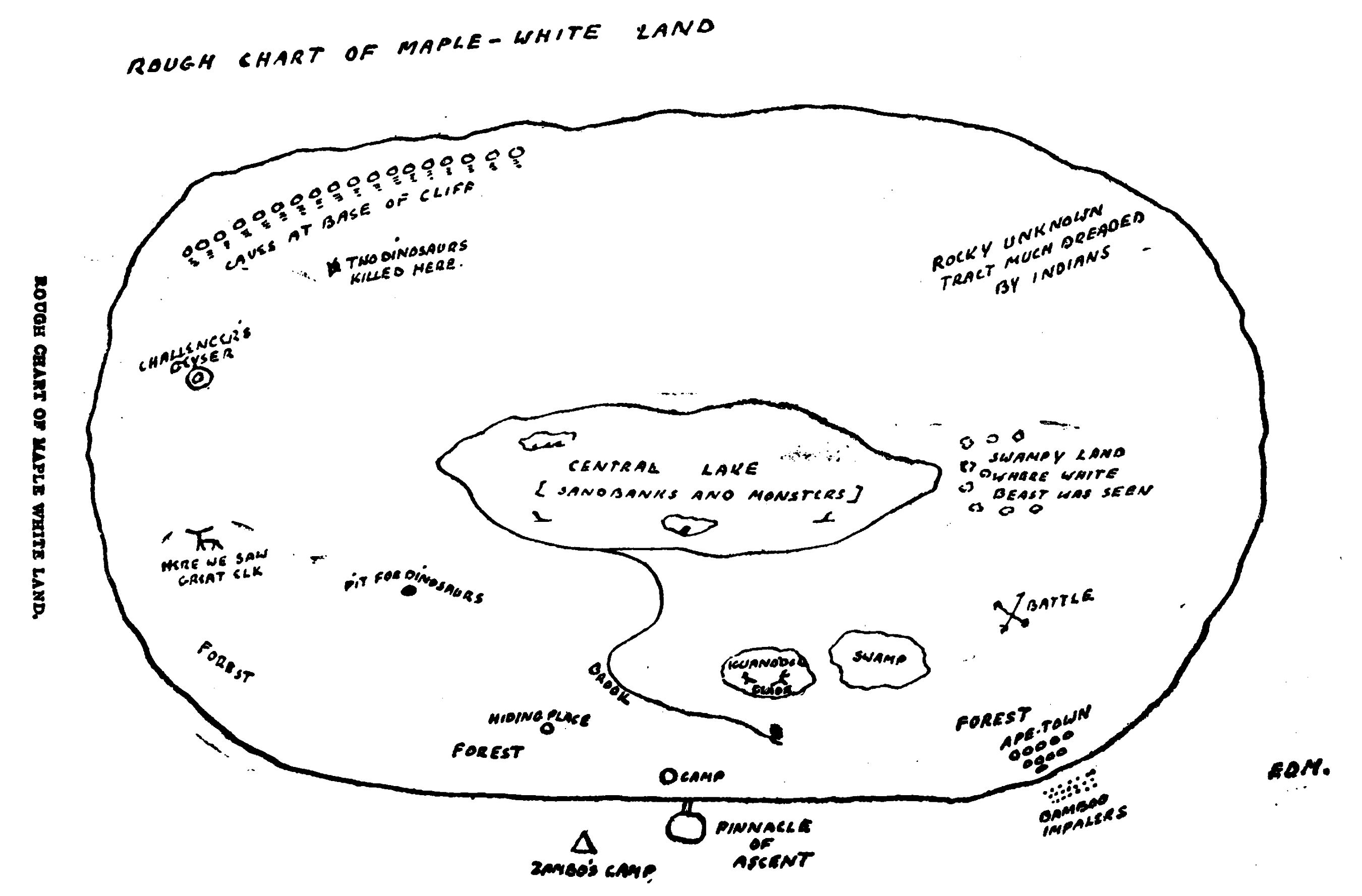
Map of Maple-White Land

Doyle was aware of his good friend Percy Harrison Fawcett's expedition to the Huanchaca Plateau in Noel Kempff Mercado National Park, Bolivia. Fawcett organised several expeditions to delimit the border between Bolivia and Brazil – an area of potential conflict between both countries. Doyle attended Fawcett's lecture to the Royal Geographical Society on 13 February 1911 and was impressed by the tale about the remote "province of Caupolican" (present day Huanchaca Plateau) in Bolivia – a dangerous area with impenetrable forests, where Fawcett saw "monstrous tracks of unknown origin".

The characters of Ed Malone and Lord John Roxton were modelled, respectively, on the journalist E. D. Morel and the diplomat Roger Casement, leaders of the Congo Free State reform campaign (the Congo Reform Association), which Doyle supported. In 1911, just when Doyle was writing the book, Casement made a second such anti-slavery reform campaign in the Amazonian part of Peru. It is possible that Malone was also based on Bertram Fletcher Robinson, a close friend of Doyle's, because like Robinson, Malone was raised in the West Country, exceeded six feet in height, became an accomplished rugby union player, worked as a London-based journalist, and he loved a woman called Gladys. Furthermore, Fletcher Robinson and Fawcett both attended Newton Abbot Proprietary School between 1882 and 1885, which was a small institution, so they were likely acquainted with each other.

Fawcett wrote in his posthumously published memoirs: "Monsters from the dawn of Man's existence might still roam these heights unchallenged, imprisoned and protected by unscalable cliffs. So thought Conan Doyle when later in London I spoke of these hills and showed photographs of them. He mentioned an idea for a novel on Central South America and asked for information, which I told him I should be glad to supply. The fruit of it was his Lost World in 1912, appearing as a serial in the Strand Magazine, and subsequently in the form of a book that achieved widespread popularity."

A 1996 Science Fiction Studies review of an annotated edition of the novel suggested that another inspiration for the story may have been the 1890s contested political history of the Pacaraima Mountains plateaux, and Mount Roraima in particular.

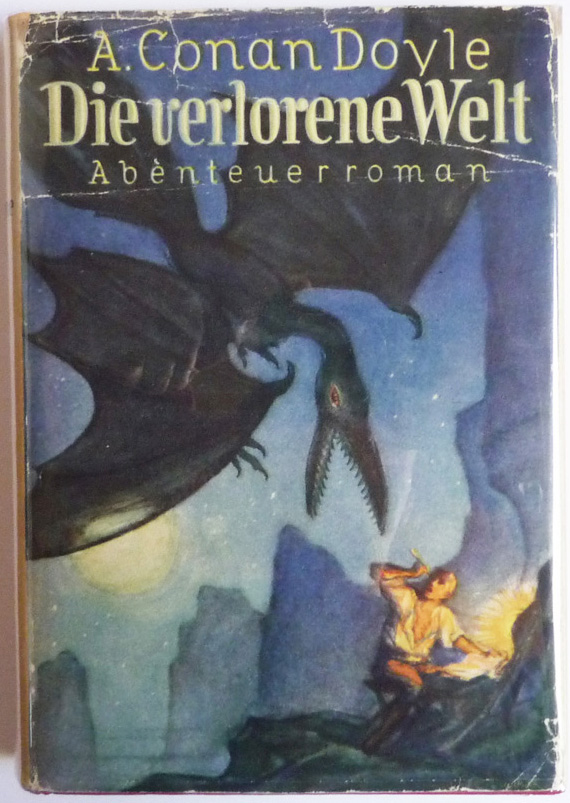
Cover of the German translation of The Lost World from 1926

Article in Science and Invention on the making of the film The Lost World (1925)

== Film, television, and radio adaptations ==
=== Film ===
Theatrical films:

- The Lost World (1925; film)
- The Lost World (1960; film)

Direct-to-video films:

- The Lost World (1992; film)
  - Return to the Lost World (1992; sequel film)
- The Lost World (1998; film)
- King of the Lost World (2005)

=== Television ===
- Sir Arthur Conan Doyle's The Lost World (1999–2002; TV series)
- The Lost World (2001; television film)
- Dinosaur Island (2002 animated film)
- Adventures in Sir Arthur Conan Doyle's The Lost World (2002) (Canadian-French-Luxembourger animated series)

=== Documentary ===
- The Real Lost World (2006)

=== Audio ===
- The Lost World (1944; radio)
  - John Dickson Carr as Narrator (all characters)
- The Lost World (1949; BBC Light Programme radio serial)
  - With Abraham Sofaer, Ivor Barnard, Lewis Stringer, Cyril Gardiner
- Dinosaurs! (1966, an audio dramatic version of The Lost World adapted and directed by Ronald Liss and recorded by permission of the Estate of Sir Arthur Conan Doyle; MGM/Leo the Lion Records C/CH-1016)
  - Basil Rathbone as Professor Challenger
  - Leo Marion as Dr. Summerlee
  - Peter Fernandez as Edward Malone
    - (The character of Lord John Roxton was not included in this adaptation.)
- The Lost World (1975 BBC Radio 4 Classic Serial)
  - Francis de Wolff as Professor Challenger
  - Gerald Harper as Lord John Roxton
  - Kevin McHugh as Edward Malone
  - Carleton Hobbs as Professor Summerlee
- The Lost World (2011; BBC Radio 4 Classic Serial)
  - David Robb as Professor Challenger
  - Jamie Glover as Lord John Roxton
  - Jonathan Forbes as Edward Malone
  - Jasmine Hyde as Dr. Diana Summerlee (a female substitute for Professor Summerlee in the original novel)
  - Jane Whittenshaw as Edith Challenger
  - Nyasha Hatendi as Maple White
  - Vinicius Salles as Querioz

== See also ==
- Lost world
- 1912 in science fiction
- Up (2009 film)
