= List of Friday the 13th: The Series episodes =

The following is a list of episodes of the horror series Friday the 13th: The Series. Starring John D. LeMay, Chris Wiggins, Louise Robey and Steve Monarque. Friday the 13th: The Series aired from October 3, 1987 to May 26, 1990 in first-run syndication, for a total of 72 episodes.

== Overview ==
| Season | Episodes | Originally released | |
| Season | Episodes | First released | Last released |
|---|---|---|---|
| 1 | 26 | October 3, 1987 | July 30, 1988 |
| 2 | 26 | September 30, 1988 | June 17, 1989 |
| 3 | 20 | October 7, 1989 | May 26, 1990 |

== Episodes ==
=== Season 1 (1987–88) ===
| No. overall | No. in season | Title | Directed by | Written by | Original release date |
|---|---|---|---|---|---|
| 1 | 1 | "The Inheritance" | William Fruet | William Taub | October 3, 1987 |
When Micki Foster and her cousin, Ryan Dallion, inherit an antique shop from their late Uncle Lewis Vendredi, they soon meet an old friend of Lewis' named Jack Marshak. He reveals to them that their inheritance comes with a devil's curse. Cursed Antique: A doll that kills people for its owner. Villain and Fate: Mary (Sarah Polley): survives, but speculated to suffer severe psychological trauma.
| 2 | 2 | "The Poison Pen" | Timothy Bond | Durnford King | October 10, 1987 |
After reading a news story, the cousins and Jack track an antique quill pen to a monastery famous for its "Oracle of Death". In order to enter, all three have to disguise themselves as monks. Cursed Antique: A quill pen that kills people by writing about them using their real name. Villain and Fate: Rupert Seldon a.k.a. Brother LeCroix (Colin Fox), struck in the back by a flying guillotine blade.
| 3 | 3 | "Cupid's Quiver" | Atom Egoyan | Stephen Katz | October 17, 1987 |
Jack, Micki and Ryan search for a cursed statuette in the houses of a local college. When they finally find it, it's in the hands of a lonely misfit, Eddie Monroe, with an unrequited love for a popular girl. Cursed Antique: The Cupid of Malek that makes people fall in love with the owner, then forces the owner to kill them. Villain and Fate: Eddie Monroe (Denis Forest), slips off a high pipe while being pursued by Ryan, landing on a table, killing him.
| 4 | 4 | "A Cup of Time" | Harvey Frost | Barbara Sachs | October 24, 1987 |
When a series of deaths of homeless people is brought to their attention, Micki and Ryan discover the murders are connected to a popular singer, Lady Die - previously Sarah Berelle. Meanwhile, Jack must deal with unwanted attention from a social worker with a crush on him. Cursed Antique: A tea cup decorated with Swapper's Ivy that strangles the drinker and trades their life for the owner's youth (albeit temporarily). Villain and Fate: Sarah Berelle (a.k.a. Lady Die), aged to death.
| 5 | 5 | "Hellowe'en" | Timothy Bond | William Taub | October 31, 1987 |
The evil spirit of Uncle Lewis crashes a Halloween party at the shop and seeks to re-enter the living world. Cursed Antique: The Amulet of Zohar that can transfer a spirit into a deceased body (as long as the body died of natural causes). Villain and Fate: Uncle Lewis's ghost, returned to Hell when he runs out of time; Evil Greta, returns to Hell after being stabbed.
| 6 | 6 | "The Great Montarro" | Richard Friedman | Durnford King | November 7, 1987 |
In order to find out who is using a set of deadly magician boxes, Jack enters a magic competition under his old alias, "Mad Marshak". Cursed Antique: A pair of Houdin boxes that transfer damage from someone performing a deadly magic trick to a trapped victim. Villain and Fate: Lyla, unknown (presumably imprisoned); Harvey Ringwald, murdered by his own deadly illusion rig.
| 7 | 7 | "Doctor Jack" | Richard Friedman | Marc Scott Zicree | November 14, 1987 |
A series of slashings leads the group to a surgeon, Dr. Vincent Howlett (Cliff Gorman), who loves the limelight. To complicate matters, a woman seek revenge on the doctor for her daughter's murder. Cursed Antique: A scalpel believed to have belonged to Jack the Ripper that guarantees a successful surgery after it is used to kill. Villain and Fate: Dr. Vincent Howlett, electrocuted and stabbed.
| 8 | 8 | "Shadow Boxer" | Timothy Bond | Josh Miller | November 21, 1987 |
A punchy, broken-down fighter, Tommy Dunn, gets in touch with his dark side. Cursed Antique: A pair of boxing gloves that allow the owner to win in the ring while his animated shadow beats someone to death. Villain and Fate: Tommy Dunn, died of accumulated head trauma.
| 9 | 9 | "Root of All Evil" | Allan King | Rob Hedden | November 28, 1987 |
Micki must decide whether to continue tracking down cursed objects or to go marry her fiance, Lloyd the lawyer, while Ryan and Jack look for a hexed mulcher. Cursed Antique: A portable garden mulcher that turns chewed up bodies into money. Villain(s) and Fate(s): Harley O'Connor, institutionalized; Adrian the gardener, shredded by the mulcher.
| 10 | 10 | "Tales of the Undead" | Lyndon Chubbuck | Teleplay by : William Taub, Marc Scott Zicree; Story by : Paul Monette, Alfred Sole | January 30, 1988 |
Ryan witnesses an attack by a character from his favorite comic book. To learn more, Ryan tracks down the comics creator, a bitter man, Jay Star (Ray Walston) with a vendetta against his former business partners. Cursed Antique: A comic book that transforms the owner into a killer robot. Villain(s) and Fate(s): Cal Rawitz and Jay Star, both impaled.
| 11 | 11 | "Scarecrow" | William Fruet | Teleplay by : Marc Scott Zicree; Story by : Larry B. Williams, Marc Scott Zicree | February 6, 1988 |
Micki and Ryan head to a small farming town where three people turn up dead each harvest. While investigating, Ryan becomes attached to a young boy who witnessed his father's death. Cursed Antique: An animated scarecrow that guarantees good crops after it beheads three victims. Villain and Fate: Marge Longacre, decapitated by the scarecrow.
| 12 | 12 | "Faith Healer" | David Cronenberg | Christine Cornish | February 13, 1988 |
A debunked faith-healer, Stewart Fishoff, acquires real healing-powers, but gets debunked again, and worse, by one of Jack's peculiar old friends, Jerry Scott (Robert A. Silverman). Cursed Antique: The Sforza glove that transfers a magnified ailment from one person to another. Villain(s) and Fate(s): Stewart Fishoff, shot; Jerry Scott, dies of skin cancer amplified by the curse of the glove.
| 13 | 13 | "The Baron's Bride" | Bradford May | Larry Gaynor | February 20, 1988 |
Micki and Ryan are thrown back in 19th century London along with a murderous, hypnotic vampire, Frank Edwards, who has his eyes on Micki. Cursed Antique(s): A black cape with a diamond clasp. The cape makes the wearer irresistible to women and the clasp allows time travel when touched by blood. Villain(s) and Fate(s): Frank Edwards, staked; Marie Simmons, impaled.
| 14 | 14 | "Bedazzled" | Alexander Singer | Paul Monette, Alfred Sole | February 27, 1988 |
After Jack and Ryan recover a cursed lantern, the owner, Jonah, tries to get it back by terrorizing Micki and her young guest at Curious Goods. Cursed Antique: A brass lantern that reveals sunken treasure as long as the lantern burns to death the diver who recovered it. Villain(s) and Fate(s): Jonah, burned by the lantern when Micki reflects its light back at him; David, shot.
| 15 | 15 | "Vanity's Mirror" | William Fruet | Teleplay by : Roy Sallows; Story by : Ira Levant, Roy Sallows | March 5, 1988 |
An unattractive girl, Helen Mackie (Ingrid Veninger), uses a magic compact to make boys who insult her fall in love with her, then kills them to make them stop pestering her. Cursed Antique: A gold compact that makes men fall in love with the owner, but they must be killed later. Villain and Fate: Helen Mackie, leaps off a building (together with her brainwashed prom date).
| 16 | 16 | "Tattoo" | Lyndon Chubbuck | Dan DiStefano, Stephen Katz | March 12, 1988 |
A compulsive gambler in Chinatown, Tommy Chen, acquires tattoo needles that enable him to win big as long as someone else loses their life. Cursed Antique: A set of Chinese tattoo needles. The tattoos come to life and kill their wearers, and the user of the needles gets certain victory in a game of chance. Villain and Fate: Tommy Chen, shot in the head during a game of Russian roulette.
| 17 | 17 | "The Electrocutioner" | Rob Hedden | Rob Hedden | April 23, 1988 |
An innocent survivor of an electric chair, Eli Pittman, uses the chair's magic powers to get revenge on those who put him in it. Cursed Antique: An electric chair that grants the owner electric powers after it is used to kill. Villain and Fate: Eli Pittman, electrocuted.
| 18 | 18 | "Brain Drain" | Lyndon Chubbuck | Josh Miller | April 30, 1988 |
A mentally impaired man (Denis Forest) uses a cursed trepanator to steal brain-power from smart people, and his next target is Jack's bride-to-be (Carrie Snodgress). Cursed Antique: A trepanator that takes the intelligence from one person who dies and gives it to another. Villain and Fate: Stewart Pangborn, remains alive but brain dead by the trepanator.
| 19 | 19 | "The Quilt of Hathor" | Timothy Bond | Janet MacLean | May 7, 1988 |
While searching for a cursed quilt in a reclusive, anti-modern religious community, Ryan falls in love and joins a religious sect. Cursed Antique: The Quilt of Hathor that lets the owner kill others in their dreams.
| 20 | 20 | "The Quilt of Hathor: The Awakening" | Timothy Bond | Janet MacLean | May 14, 1988 |
Ryan is framed by the town leader, Josiah Grange, as the mastermind of all the killings. Villain(s) and Fate(s): Josiah Grange, falls to his death; Effie Stokes, neck and back broken.
| 21 | 21 | "Double Exposure" | Neill Fearnley | Durnford King | May 21, 1988 |
Ryan sees a famous television newscaster, Winston Knight, hack someone to death with a machete at the same time he was on the air live. Cursed Antique: A camera that produces a murderous double of the person whose picture was taken. The original will die if the negative and double aren't destroyed. Villain(s) and Fate(s): Winston Knight, vanished from existence; Knight's duplicate, bleeds to death after being stabbed by Ryan, and becoming human after the real Knight dies.
| 22 | 22 | "The Pirate's Promise" | Bill Corcoran | Carl Binder | July 2, 1988 |
Ryan and Micki visit a small seaside town which is haunted by the ghost of a murderous, long-dead pirate Angus McBride. Joe Fenton murders the innocent descendants of McBrides mutinous crew in order to be "rewarded" by the ghost of pirate McBride Cursed Antique: A foghorn that summons the murderous spirit of a pirate who claims he will trade his treasure for the lives of the descendants of his mutinous crew. Villain and Fate: Joe Fenton, hooked alive by the ghost of Angus McBride and dragged away to the other world.
| 23 | 23 | "Badge of Honor" | Michelle Manning | Teleplay by : Roy Sallows; Story by : Jim Henshaw, Roy Sallows | July 9, 1988 |
A bitter, burnt-out cop Russ Sharko (Val Avery) uses a cursed badge to get revenge on the mobsters, led by Victor Haas, who put his dying wife into a brain dead coma. Meanwhile, an old boyfriend of Micki's comes for an extended visit. Cursed Antique: A sheriff star which violently kills anyone it is pinned to. Villain(s) and Fate(s): Russ Sharko, mortally wounded; Victor Haas (David Proval), killed by the dying Sharko with the badge .
| 24 | 24 | "Pipe Dream" | Zale Dalen | Marc Scott Zicree | July 16, 1988 |
Ryan is invited to his father's wedding, but learns that his father, Ray (Michael Constantine), has been using a magic pipe to murder his business rivals in the military industry. Cursed Antique: A tobacco pipe that emits smoke that incinerates a victim. Villain and Fate: Ray Dallion, killed by the pipe.
| 25 | 25 | "What a Mother Wouldn't Do" | Neill Fearnley | Bruce Martin | July 23, 1988 |
A cursed cradle from the RMS Titanic compels the parents of a sick baby to drown people, in order to save their baby's life. Cursed Antique: A cradle that keeps an ill baby alive and cures them after the parents kill seven people in water. Villain and Fate: Leslie Kent, falls into a fountain after leaping from a balcony.
| 26 | 26 | "Bottle of Dreams" | Mac Bradden | Roy Sallows | July 30, 1988 |
Micki and Ryan are trapped inside the vault with a cursed urn that conjures up a wave of nightmare flashbacks. Cursed Antique: An Egyptian canopic jar that emits a mist that traps its victims in their worst memories. Villain & Fate: Lewis Vendredi's spirit, disappears when he fails. Rashid mentions his spirit still wanders the netherworld, teasing that he'd still attempt to return.

=== Season 2 (1988–89) ===
| No. overall | No. in season | Title | Directed by | Written by | Original release date |
|---|---|---|---|---|---|
| 27 | 1 | "Doorway to Hell" | William Fruet | Jim Henshaw | September 30, 1988 |
Uncle Lewis's ghost is back and he lures Ryan and Micki to an abandoned home in hopes of eliminating them and returning to the living world. Cursed Antique: A mirror that acts as a portal to the Realm of Darkness. Though magical, it is technically not one of the cursed antiques.
| 28 | 2 | "The Voodoo Mambo" | Timothy Bond | Agy Polly | October 7, 1988 |
A disinherited man, Carl Walters, uses, and is used by, a bloodthirsty voodoo priestess Laotia who is connected to an old friend of Jack. Cursed Antique: A voodoo mask of Ghede Nibo that contains the evil spirit of a voodoo priestess and steals the souls of others by ripping out their throats. Villain[s] & Fate: Carl Walters, killed by Laotia. Laotia is killed when, after returning to the living, the mask rips her throat out.
| 29 | 3 | "And Now the News" | Bruce Pittman | Richard Brenner | October 14, 1988 |
Just as an ambitious psychiatrist, Dr. Avril Carter's (Kate Trotter's) patients are enjoying miraculous cures, other doctors' patients are being frightened to death, literally. Cursed Antique: A cathedrals type radio that transmits valuable information to the owner after it frightens its listeners to death. Villain and Fate: Dr. Avril Carter, electrocuted to death by the radio.
| 30 | 4 | "Tails I Live, Heads You Die" | Mark Sobel | Marilyn Anderson, Billy Riback | October 21, 1988 |
The leader of a Satanic cult, Sylvan Winters (Colin Fox), brings powerful, long-dead magicians, Carl Naft and Tiriel, back to life. Together, they plan to summon Satan himself, and to "rule the world, in His name". Cursed Antique: The Coin of Zioclese that can bring others back to life after it kills someone, leaving a ram's head branded on their forehead. Villain(s) and Fate: Sylvan Winters, his cult-members, and two reanimated dead magicians Carl Naft and Tiriel, all buried under tons of rubble.
| 31 | 5 | "Symphony in B-Sharp" | Francis Delia | Teleplay by : Carl Binder; Story by : Peter Mohan | November 4, 1988 |
Ryan falls for a talented young violinist (Ely Pouget) who is being haunted by her supposedly dead mentor and lover, Janos Korda. Cursed Antique: A violin that temporarily restores its owner's crippled hands after killing someone with a blade hidden in the bow. Villain and Fate: Janos Korda, leaps to his death.
| 32 | 6 | "Master of Disguise" | Tom McLoughlin | Bruce Martin | November 11, 1988 |
While providing antiques to a film set, Micki catches the eye of an up-and-coming actor, William Pratt, whose good looks mask an ugly agenda. Cursed Antique: A makeup case belonging to John Wilkes Booth, that temporarily grants its deformed owner good looks, after it is covered with blood from a murder victim. Villain and Fate: William Pratt, incarcerated. Trivia: This episode reveals Jack knew Boris Karloff.
| 33 | 7 | "Wax Magic" | William Fruet | Carl Binder | November 18, 1988 |
Ryan gets close to the wife of a jealous wax sculptor, Alwen Chase, while investigating a series of axe-murders at a local carnival. Cursed Antique: A handkerchief belonging to Louis XVI that gives life to wax statues, but one must kill for the other to live. Villain and Fate: Alwen Chase, never revealed (presumably incarcerated).
| 34 | 8 | "Read My Lips" | Francis Delia | Peter Lauterman, Angelo Stea | November 25, 1988 |
An old friend of Micki's is about to marry a ventriloquist, Edgar van Horne, whose sharp-humored dummy does not approve. Cursed Antique: Adolf Hitler's pink silk boutonniere that brings a ventriloquist's dummy to life and compels people (Billy Drago, John Byner) to kill. Villain(s) and Fate(s): Edgar van Horne, driven insane and locked up in a mental institution; Travis Plunkett, stabbed to death by the dummy.
| 35 | 9 | "13 O’Clock" | Rob Hedden | Rob Hedden | January 7, 1989 |
A rich man, Henry Wilkerson's ambitious trophy-wife, Reatha Wilkerson, (Gwynyth Walsh) murders him for his magical stopwatch. Two street-kids witness the murder, and appeal to Curious Goods for help. Cursed Antique: A pocket watch that stops time for an hour at 1 a.m. (the 13th hour), allowing the user to plunder the motionless world, after the owner kills someone. Villain(s) and Fate(s): Reatha Wilkerson and Eric (David Proval), frozen in time; Henry Wilkerson, stabbed to death.
| 36 | 10 | "Night Hunger" | Martin Lavut | Jim Henshaw | January 14, 1989 |
Curious Goods neighbor Dominic Fiorno asks the group to help his son Michael, who has been driving in illegal amateur car-races. Cursed Antique: A silver chain with a blank car key that magically upgrades its owner's car after its dipped in the blood of a run over victim and gives them telepathic control over their car after it wraps itself around their heart. Villain and Fate: Michael Fiorno, caught in a car crash and burned to death.
| 37 | 11 | "The Sweetest Sting" | David Winning | Teleplay by : Rick Butler, Roy Sallows; Story by : Rick Butler | January 21, 1989 |
A beekeeper Elroy McCabe (Art Hindle) uses a swarm of vampiric bees to provide terminal patients with new bodies, and to extort money and services from them afterwards. Cursed Antique: A transport beehive which causes the bees to become vampires, able to transfer life-force from one person to another by stinging. Villain and Fate: McCabe, killed by the bees.
| 38 | 12 | "The Playhouse" | Tom McLoughlin | Tom McLoughlin | January 28, 1989 |
Two abused children, Mike and Janine Carlson, are connected with a mysterious rash of disappearing children. Cursed Antique: A playhouse that grants children a fantasy world, but they must lure other children into it as prisoners. Villain & Fate: Mike and Janine Carlson, placed into foster care. The children are not true villains, more along the lines of anti-heroes. Trivia: The only episode with no deaths.
| 39 | 13 | "Eye of Death" | Timothy Bond | Peter Jobin, Timothy Bond, Roy Sallows | February 4, 1989 |
Another antique dealer and formerly one of Jack's business rivals, Atticus Rook, is time-traveling and getting collectible Civil War artifacts straight from the battlefields. While trying to stop him, Ryan becomes trapped in the past. Cursed Antique: The Eye of Death Civil War Era magic lantern that allows its owner to travel back to the time shown in the slide, requiring a murder for each leg of the trip. Villain and Fate: Atticus Rook, materialized inside a solid wall because of a time-travel mishap.
| 40 | 14 | "Face of Evil" | William Fruet | Jim Henshaw | February 11, 1989 |
An aging super-model, Tabitha Robbins, uses the cursed compact to revive her career, at the cost of her competition's lives. Cursed Antique: The gold compact, lost at the end of "Vanity's Mirror", is found, but now it restores a model's beauty by killing others or mutilating their faces. Villain and Fate: Tabitha Robbins, killed by the power of the compact.
| 41 | 15 | "Better Off Dead" | Armand Mastroianni | Bruce Martin | February 18, 1989 |
A doctor, Warren Voss, (Neil Munro) has been abducting prostitutes in order to experiment on them and find a cure for "hyper-violence syndrome". Jack, Micki, and Ryan learn that Dr. Voss is also willing to experiment on women who are not prostitutes. Cursed Antique: A silver syringe that extracts part of the soul from others, allowing him to temporarily cure his daughter of her hyper-violence, but the "donors" become hyper-violent themselves. Villain and Fate: Dr. Warren Voss, killed by his own hyper-violent daughter.
| 42 | 16 | "Scarlet Cinema" | David Winning | Rob Hedden | February 25, 1989 |
A film student with a thing for werewolf films, Darius Pogue, uses a cursed movie camera to bring the beast to life, and, eventually, to become a werewolf himself. Cursed Antique: A movie camera that brings film characters to life, and grants wishes after the character kills three people. Villain and Fate: Darius Pogue, killed in werewolf form, not by a silver bullet, but by a length of film coated with silver nitrate.
| 43 | 17 | "The Mephisto Ring" | Bruce Pittman | Teleplay by : Marilyn Anderson, Billy Ryback; Story by : Peter Largo | April 15, 1989 |
An indebted gambler, Donald Wren (Denis Forest), may have struck it rich with a ring that provides betting tips at the cost of a person's life. Cursed Antique: A 1919 World Series ring that predicts the outcome of sporting events after killing someone who puts it on. Villain(s) and Fate(s): Donald Wren, shot to death; Anthony Macklin, killed by the ring.
| 44 | 18 | "A Friend to the End" | David Morse | Teleplay by : Scott Schneid, Tony Michelman; Story by : David Morse, Scott Schneid, Tony Michelman | April 22, 1989 |
While Micki and Ryan track down a sculptor, DeJager, who turns her models into stone statues, Micki's lonely nephew, J.B, finds a new, dangerous playmate, Ricky. Cursed Antique: A stone fragment called the Shard of Medusa that turns people to stone, and a child's coffin that resurrects a dead child, but the child must kill to stay alive. Villain(s) and Fate(s): DeJager, reclaims the Shard of Medusa and escapes to Europe; Ricky, allows himself to decay to death after J.B. persuades him not to kill Micki. (Only episode where a cursed artifact is not recovered by Micki and Ryan)
| 45 | 19 | "The Butcher" | Francis Delia | Francis Delia, Ron Magid | April 29, 1989 |
Jack's past comes back to haunt him in the form of a resurrected Nazi officer, Rausch (Nigel Bennett) whom he killed and must kill again. Cursed Antique: The silver Thule Amulet, which allows a Nazi criminal to resurrect a dead warrior and communicate telepathically with him. Villain[s] and Fate: Rausch, posing as Karl Steiner. Strangled with barb wire and finally dies when the amulet is taken from him and placed in the vault. However, the events are masterminded by Horst Mueller (Colin Fox), who is incarcerated throughout most of the episode.
| 46 | 20 | "Mesmer's Bauble" | Armand Mastroianni | Joe Gannon | May 6, 1989 |
A lonely man, Howard Moore, uses a cursed bauble to get close to a beautiful popular singer, Angelica (Vanity) - very, very close. Cursed Antique: A hypnotist's crystal bauble that grants wishes after it is used to kill a hypnotized victim. Villain and Fate: Moore transformed into Angelica, however without the crystal he is exposed as himself and is electrocuted.
| 47 | 21 | "Wedding in Black" | Rodney Charters | Peter Lauterman, Angelo Stea | May 13, 1989 |
The Devil (Satan) sends three dead souls, Calvin Collier, Maya Zedler, and Brother Antonio, back into the living world, with orders to lure Ryan, Micki, and Jack out of it. Cursed Antique: A snow globe that traps its victims in a fantasy landscape. Though magical, it is technically not one of the cursed antiques and is destroyed. Villain and Fate: Calvin Collier, Maya Zedler, and Brother Antonio sent by Satan. All three were technically souls sent back after failing their task.
| 48 | 22 | "Wedding Bell Blues" | Jorge Montesi | Nancy Ann Miller | May 20, 1989 |
With help from Johnny Ventura, Micki hunts down a hexed pool cue, which is being used by Jennifer Carpenter, a woman with terrible taste in love. Cursed Antique: A cue stick that grants unbeatable skill at pool after it is used to kill someone. Villain and Fate: Jennifer Carpenter, unknown after murdering her fiancé, Danny (presumably either incarcerated or died from her injuries).
| 49 | 23 | "The Maestro" | Timothy Bond | Karen Janigan | May 27, 1989 |
Jack's niece, Grace, comes to town to dance for a prestigious choreographer Anton Pascola (Colm Feore), whose dancers seem prone to suicide and deadly accidents. Cursed Antique: A Victorian symphonia (music box) that provides new choreographic material, but kills the dancers in the process. Villain and Fate: Anton Pascola, literally dances to death, taking Grace with him.
| 50 | 24 | "The Shaman's Apprentice" | William Fruet | Michael Michaelian | June 3, 1989 |
A Native American doctor, John Whitecloud, uses a magic rattle to cure terminally ill patients, and to kill people who disrespect his Shamanist faith. Cursed Antique: A Native American shaman's ceremonial rattle that can cure any disease, but only after it is used to kill. Villain and Fate: Dr. John Whitecloud, presumably dragged off into the afterlife.
| 51 | 25 | "The Prisoner" | Armand Mastroianni | Jim Henshaw | June 10, 1989 |
An invisible burglar kills Johnny's father, and sets Johnny up as the killer. While in prison awaiting trial, Johnny recognizes the murderer, Dayton Railsback, by smell. Cursed Antique: A Japanese kamikaze pilot jacket that renders the wearer invisible after it is smeared with blood from a murder victim. Villain and Fate: Dayton Railsback, burned to death.
| 52 | 26 | "Coven of Darkness" | George Bloomfield | Wendy Rodriguez | June 17, 1989 |
Uncle Lewis's old witches coven, led by Lysa Redding, wants a powerful witch's ladder that will enhance their powers, and they hex Ryan to get it for them. Meanwhile, Micki discovers her new potential. Cursed Antique: A witch's ladder that can greatly enhances the owner's magic powers. Also a sculptor's tool that enchants victims by shaping their likeness in clay. Villain and Fate: Lysa Redding, killed by a bolt of psychic energy sent by Micki through Ryan that sends her through a window. Ryan uses this power to destroy the entire coven.

=== Season 3 (1989–90) ===
| No. overall | No. in season | Title | Directed by | Written by | Original release date |
|---|---|---|---|---|---|
| 53 | 1 | "The Prophecies" | Tom McLoughlin | Tom McLoughlin | October 7, 1989 |
| 54 | 2 | "The Prophecies" | Tom McLoughlin | Tom McLoughlin | October 7, 1989 |
Jack heads to France to investigate strange events that are connected to a prophecy that will bring about the antichrist. During the investigation, Ryan is turned into a servant of the devil and the only hope he has is a young girl who believes in God's love. Cursed Antique: One of three Books of Lucifer that makes the prophecies written in it real. Though magical, it is not one of Vendredi's antiques. Villain and Fate: Asteroth in human form (Fritz Weaver). He burns up when he fails and disappears after exploding. Trivia: The last episode with the appearance of John D. Lemay.
| 55 | 3 | "Demon Hunter" | Armand Mastroianni | Jim Henshaw | October 14, 1989 |
A family of ex-cultists is being hunted by a demon, and they have tracked paranormal activity right to the shop. Cursed Antique: A golden ritual dagger that allows one to summon a demon. Villain(s) and Fate(s): Bonnie Cassidy, stabbed with the dagger; Ahriman, sent back to Hell.
| 56 | 4 | "Crippled Inside" | Timothy Bond | Brian Helgeland | October 21, 1989 |
While fleeing from a gang-assault, a girl is hit by a car and paralyzed. She then uses a magical wheelchair to reverse her paralysis and to kill her assailants. Cursed Antique: A wheelchair that heals crippling neurotraumatic injuries by killing others, and projects a dangerous ghostly double of the owner. Villain[s] and Fate: Rachel Horn, killed when the final assailant pushes her down the stairs in the cursed wheelchair. She manages to take him with her.
| 57 | 5 | "Stick It in Your Ear" | Douglas Jackson | Jon Ezrine | October 28, 1989 |
A stage-performer with a bad mind-reading act acquires genuine telepathic powers and murderous compulsions. Cursed Antique: A hearing aid that allows the wearer to read minds, but the thoughts build up and must be transferred to another person, killing them. Villain and Fate: Adam Cole, killed by the absorbed thoughts.
| 58 | 6 | "Bad Penny" | William Fruet | Marilyn Anderson, Billy Ryback | November 11, 1989 |
A crooked cop finds the hexed coin and uses it for his own ends until Johnny steals it and uses it to restore his father to life. Meanwhile, the coin's return has Micki terrified. Cursed Antique: The coin of Zioclese from season two. Villain[s] and Fate: Edward Briggs (twice-once in the line of duty, then returned using the coin. The resurrected Briggs is bludgeoned by Micki) and Romeo Koslow, betrayed by the resurrected Briggs.
| 59 | 7 | "Hate on Your Dial" | Allan Eastman | Nancy Ann Miller | November 18, 1989 |
Johnny carelessly sells a cursed car radio to the brother of a racist man. The racist travels back in time and tries to prevent his father, a member of "The Clan", from being convicted of murder. Cursed Antique: A 1954 Chevy car radio that allows time travel when it is smeared with blood. Villain and Fate: Ray Pierce, burned alive by "the Clan".
| 60 | 8 | "Night Prey" | Armand Mastroianni | Peter Mohan | November 25, 1989 |
A vampire hunter steals a golden cross that kills vampires, in order to get revenge on the vampire that turned his wife into a vampire. Cursed Antique: The Cross of Fire, which can destroy vampires after the owner kills someone with a blade hidden in the cross. Villain[s] and Fate: Vampire Eric Van Hellier, killed after being staked by Kurt Bachman; Kurt Bachman, turned into a vampire by his wife and killed when Jack splashes him with holy water after. His vampire wife escapes.
| 61 | 9 | "Femme Fatale" | Francis Delia | Jeffrey Bernini | December 2, 1989 |
An aging director Desmond Williams (Gordon Pinsent) frolics with the female lead character Gllenda from one of his classic noir movies, who convinces him to kill his wife. Cursed Antique: A 16 mm movie print that releases a character for the duration of the film, as long as a live person takes their place in the deadly action. Villain(s) and Fate(s): Williams, shot; Glenda, burned.
| 62 | 10 | "Mightier Than the Sword" | Armand Mastroianni | Brian Helgeland | January 20, 1990 |
An author (Colm Feore) gets rich by turning innocent people into homicidal maniacs, and writing true-crime thrillers about them. While tracking him, Micki becomes his next victim. Cursed Antique: A fountain pen that injects people with "evil" that forces them to do whatever the owner writes. Villain and Fate: Alex Dent, slashed with a razor by Micki.
| 63 | 11 | "Year of the Monkey" | Rodney Charters | R. Scott Gemmill | January 27, 1990 |
A samurai instructor offers the group the return of a cursed tea set if they help him retrieve three cursed monkey statues. Cursed Antique: A set of statuettes of the three wise monkeys that tests the honor of their owner and his heirs. (Though magical, they are technically not Vendredi's antiques. Also a Japanese tea set that turns ordinary tea into poison.) The statues owner Tanaka (Robert Ito) keeps himself alive for centuries by tricking a new generation of his children to commit "Dishonor" and then be killed by the statues power Villain and Fate: Tanaka Falls victim to two of the monkey statues after committing "Dishonor"
| 64 | 12 | "Epitaph for a Lonely Soul" | Allan Kroeker | Carl Binder | February 3, 1990 |
A mortician (Neil Munro), desperate for companionship, acquires a tool that brings back the dead. When he resurrects a young woman, her fiance seeks help from the shop. Cursed Antique: A mortician's aspirator that drains the life from one person and then transfers it to a dead body, bringing it back to life. Villain and Fate: Eli Leonard, impaled on the aspirator after falling down a flight of stairs, then burned to death.
| 65 | 13 | "Midnight Riders" | Allan Eastman | Jim Henshaw | February 10, 1990 |
Jack, Micki, and Johnny visit a small town haunted by the evil ghosts of bikers who were wrongly accused of rape and lynched. Meanwhile, Jack meets his spirit of his deceased father for the first time in years. Cursed Antique: None. However Jack, Micki, and Johnny manage to lay the evil ghosts to rest, while as a reward for helping them Jack's father goes to heaven
| 66 | 14 | "Repetition" | William Fruet | Jennifer Lynch | February 17, 1990 |
A newspaper columnist Walter Cromwell goes mad after running over a girl, and kills a series of people, each in order to resurrect the previous victim with the help of the deceased victims locket. Cursed Antique: A cameo pendant that resurrects the previous wearer if someone else wearing it is killed. However the user is haunted by the voices of those killed. Villain and Fate: Cromwell goes mad from the voices he hears and commits suicide; The Locket ends up in the hands of Micki's Friend social worker Annie, who gives it to Micki
| 67 | 15 | "The Long Road Home" | Allan Kroeker | Carl Binder | February 24, 1990 |
After recovering a cursed charm in another city, Micki and Johnny run into a family of nasty rural degenerates while driving home. Cursed Antique: A small yin-yang charm that enables the owner to transfer their consciousness into the body of someone they've killed. Villain(s) and Fate(s): Jerry, electrocuted during a fight with Johnny after transferring his mind into someone else's body; Eddie, stabbed; Mike, mind transferred into stuffed corpse, stabbed, then caught in a bear trap as storm winds blow in, scattering the sawdust in his body. (Loosely based on the Edward Gein murders)
| 68 | 16 | "My Wife as a Dog" | Armand Mastroianni | Jim Henshaw | March 3, 1990 |
A firefighter (Denis Forest) in the middle of a drawn-out divorce uses a cursed leash to turn his wife into a dog, and his dog into his wife. Cursed Antique: The Aboriginal Leash of Dreams that makes its owner's dream come true after they strangle others with it. Villain and Fate: Aubrey Ross, incarcerated for killing several people in his effort to put his dog's mind into his wife's body, which survives. His dog's body is killed with his wife's mind.
| 69 | 17 | "Jack-in-the-Box" | David Winning | Dennis Foon | May 5, 1990 |
After her father is murdered, a young girl Megan uses a jack-in-the-box to exact revenge and to see her father's spirit. Cursed Antique: The Drowned Sailor jack-in-the-box that allows its owner to see the spirit of her dead father after it drowns people. Villain(s) and Fate(s): Megan Garrett, stopped from committing suicide; Mike Reilly, drowned.
| 70 | 18 | "Spirit of Television" | Jorge Montesi | Bob Holbrook | May 12, 1990 |
The trio investigates a terminally ill psychic Zandt/Robinson (Marj Dusay) whose celebrity clients are all getting killed in "accidents" involving television sets. Cursed Antique: An old television set that summons the spirits of the deceased that kill those who wronged them, then it prolongs its owners life. Villain[s] and Fate: Ilsa Van Zandt/Elly Robinson, with her henchman pulled into the spirit world through the television.
| 71 | 19 | "The Tree of Life" | William Fruet | Christine Foster | May 19, 1990 |
A grieving mother claims that an all-female cult run by Dr Sybil Oakwood is keeping her daughter as their own. Cursed Antique: A Druidic fertility (Cernunnos) idol, that guarantees the birth of fraternal twins of the opposite gender at the cost of the father's life. Villain and Fate: Dr Oakwood ends up killed
| 72 | 20 | "The Charnel Pit" | Armand Mastroianni | Jim Henshaw | May 26, 1990 |
A history professor (Vlasta Vrána) sends Micki back in time into the dungeons of the Marquis de Sade (Neil Munro), who shows her new ways to enjoy life. Cursed Antique: A double sided painting that acts as a time portal when it is touched by blood. One person is sent to the past alive and another person, carrying gifts, is sent forward dead. Villain and Fate: Webster Eby, stabbed, and Marquis de Sade.

== See also ==
- List of Friday the 13th media
