= Tamara Gorski =

Canadian actress

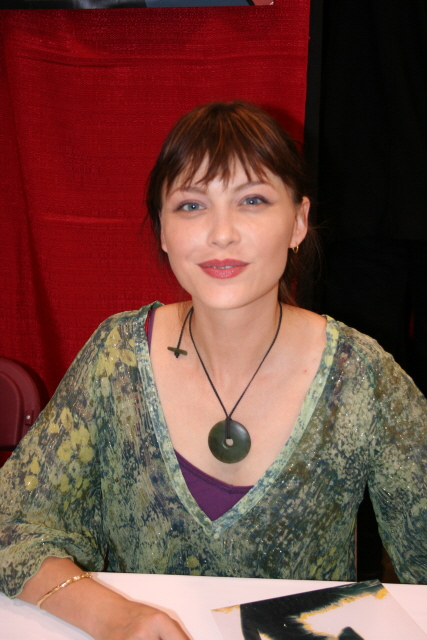
- Tamara Gorski, 2005
- Born: 21 November 1968 (age 57); Winnipeg, Manitoba, Canada
- Occupations: Actress, writer, singer, dancer and director
- Years active: 1989–present

Tamara Gorski is a Canadian actress. She is of Ukrainian descent.

== Filmography ==
Year	Title	Role	Notes
1989	Friday the 13th: The Series	Hooker	Episode: "Night Prey"
1990	My Secret Identity	Alison Ritchie	Episode: "Trading Places"
1991	The Kids in the Hall	Bruce's 'Special Friend'	Episode: "2.14"
1991	Dracula: The Series	Alexa Singleton	Episode: "Sophie, Queen of the Night"; Episode: "My Girlfriend's Back and There's Gonna Be Trouble"
1992	The Lost World	Jenny Nielson	
1992	Return to the Lost World	Jenny Nielson	
1992	Kung Fu: The Legend Continues	Det. Carrie Egstrom	TV movie
1992	Mrs. 'Arris Goes to Paris	Natasha Petitpierre	TV movie
1993	The Hidden Room	Janet / Mandy	Episode: "Happily Ever After"
1993	JFK: Reckless Youth	Emma	TV movie
1993	The Kids in the Hall	The New Girl	Episode: "4.2"
1994	The Kids in the Hall	Lorraine	Episode: "5.13"
1994	Street Legal	Christine Miller	Episode: "The Long and Winding Road"'
1994	Danielle Steel's A Perfect Stranger	Sarah	TV movie
1994	Broken Lullaby	Daria	TV movie
1994	Picture Windows	Anna Martin	TV series
1995	Highlander	Peggy McCall	Episode: "Vendetta"
1995	To Die For	Chick #2 at Bar	
1995	Forever Knight	Claire Gibson	Episode: "Black Buddha: Part 1"
1996	Psi Factor: Chronicles of the Paranormal	Dr. Alexandra Corliss	3 episodes
1997	A Taste of Shakespeare	Nerissa	Episode: "The Merchant of Venice"
1997	Murder at 1600	Young Woman in Bar	
1997	Once a Thief	Droog / Rita Pratt	Episode: "Wang Wang Doodle"
1998	Straight Up	Corey	Episode: "Pudding"; Episode: "Bomb"
1998–1999	Hercules: The Legendary Journeys	Morrigan	8 episodes
1999	Hercules: The Legendary Journeys	Norma Bates	Episode: "For Those of You Just Joining Us..."
1999	Striking Poses	Casey Roper	
1999	Poltergeist: The Legacy	Megan Torrance	4 episodes
2000	Twice in a Lifetime	Young Louise	Episode: "Birds of Paradise"
2000	Now and Again	Vanessa	Episode: "Disco Inferno"
2000	Earth: Final Conflict	Hanna Klein	Episode: "Subterfuge"
2000	Angel	Rebecca Lowell	Episode: "Eternity"
2001	Haven	Manya Hartmeyer-Breuer	
2002	The Job	Nun	Episode: "Sacrilege"
2002	Witchblade	Adrienne / Dr. Anna Granger	Episode: "Static"
2002	Soul Food	Brenda Caffey	Episode: "Empty Spaces"
2003	Veritas: The Quest	Sylvie	Episode: "Mummy Virus"
2003	The In-Laws	Yadira	
2004	Anonymous Rex	Circe	TV movie
2005	Missing	Dr. Ellen Strayhorne	Episode: "We Are Coming Home"
2005	Man with the Screaming Brain	Tatoya	
2006	Angela's Eyes	Marla Saffer	Episode: "The Camera's Eye"
2006	Without a Trace	Odeta Marku	Episode: "The Damage Done"
2007	Ocean Without a Shore		
2007	Jeff Ltd.	Lenka	Episode: "The Accidental Hero: Part 1"; Episode: "The Accidental Hero: Part 2"
2008	Brothers & Sisters	Yvonne Kalo	Episode: "The Missionary Imposition"
2008	In Plain Sight	Mina	Episode: "To Serge with Love"
2009	Flashpoint	Allison	Episode: "Never Let You Down"
2010	Cell 213	Lynn	
2010	The Next Three Days	Hospital Nurse	
2011	Getting Past the Bull	Meg	Short film
2011	Murdoch Mysteries	Ava Moon / Constance Gardiner	Episode: "Murdoch in Wonderland"
2012	Verdict	Tavia Booth	
2012	Less Than Kind	Tanya	Episode: "Lawyers and Cougars and Bankers, Oh My!"
2012	My Awkward Sexual Adventure	Tanya	
