= The Man Who Wouldn't Die =

The Man Who Wouldn't Die may refer to:

- "The Man Who Wouldn't Die", a short story by Ruth Sawyer, published in the April 1917 issue of The Ladies’ Home Journal
- The Man Who Wouldn't Die (1942 film), starring Lloyd Nolan
- The Man Who Wouldn't Die (1995 film), a made-for-television movie featuring Roger Moore
- "The Man Who Wouldn't Die", an episode of the western television series Death Valley Days

== See also ==
- "The Man Who Couldn't Die", an episode of the western television series The Virginian
- The Man Who Would Not Die
- The Woman Who Wouldn't Die, an alternate title for the 1965 British film Catacombs
