= Steve Monarque =

American actor (born 1959)

- Born: April 2, 1959 (age 66); Pompton Lakes, New Jersey, U.S.
- Occupations: Actor; director; writer; musician

Steve Monarque (born April 2, 1959) is a New York-based actor, director, writer and musician.

== Life and career ==
Monarque was born and raised in the suburban New Jersey community of Pompton Lakes.

Monarque has appeared in films including No Small Affair and Sixteen Candles. In 1985, he was the lead in a special MTV video for the song "25 or 6 to 4" by the rock band Chicago. He also starred in the late eighties romantic comedy film Under the Boardwalk. Monarque starred in two award-winning TV movies, ABC Afterschool Specials: Stoned (1980), co-starring with Scott Baio, and CBS Schoolbreak Special: The Day the Senior Class Got Married (1985), co-starring with Paul Dooley.

In 1989, he joined the syndicated sci-fi horror series Friday the 13th: The Series, as regular cast member Johnny Ventura, a streetwise kid and freelance writer who works part-time at an antiques store and who helped his store partners collect special items that had been previously cursed by the Devil. The series, also starring Chris Wiggins, Louise Robey, and John D. LeMay, is known in Europe under the title Friday's Curse. It has a loyal cult following and remains a favorite program for many horror TV fans worldwide.

After landing a role in a Chris Carter movie entitled Fencewalker, Monarque then went on to work on ER, Close to Home and Law & Order: Criminal Intent.

Monarque is also a director, writer, musician and composer. Monarque’s play That's Life was produced at the Egyptian Theater in Los Angeles in 2002. Monarque’s writing-directing effort Free Country won best play in the 2009 Strawberry One Act Festival and won best short film at the New York City International Film Festival (2011). "Free Country" has been published and can be found in the Drama Book Shop NYC and online. The founder of MonaVision Films, Monarque’s latest writing-directing project, Simpler Times, a 33-minute made-for-TV short film starring Jerry Stiller, was completed in 2014. "Simpler Times" festival screenings and awards include: HollyShorts Film Festival, the Nevada International Film Festival (Platinum Reel Award); the Lighthouse International Film Festival, NJ (Audience Choice Award, Best Short Film); the Columbia Gorge International Film Festival (Best Director); WorldFest Houston (Gold Remi Award); the Manhattan Film Festival (Winner); the Big Apple Film Festival (Golden Apple Award presented to Jerry Stiller); the Fort Lauderdale International Film Festival (Spirit of the Independent Award); the International Family Film Festival, Hollywood, CA (Best Short Comedy); the San Diego Jewish Film Festival; the New Jersey International Film Festival (Honorable Mention) and the Los Angeles International Short Film Festival (LA Shorts Fest). In 2013, he was interviewed in a documentary film Crystal Lake Memories: The Complete History of Friday the 13th.
