= Nathania =

Nathania may refer to:

- Netanya, city in Israel
- Nathania Stanford, actor in The Lost World (1992 film)
