= Eric McCormack =

Canadian actor (born 1963)

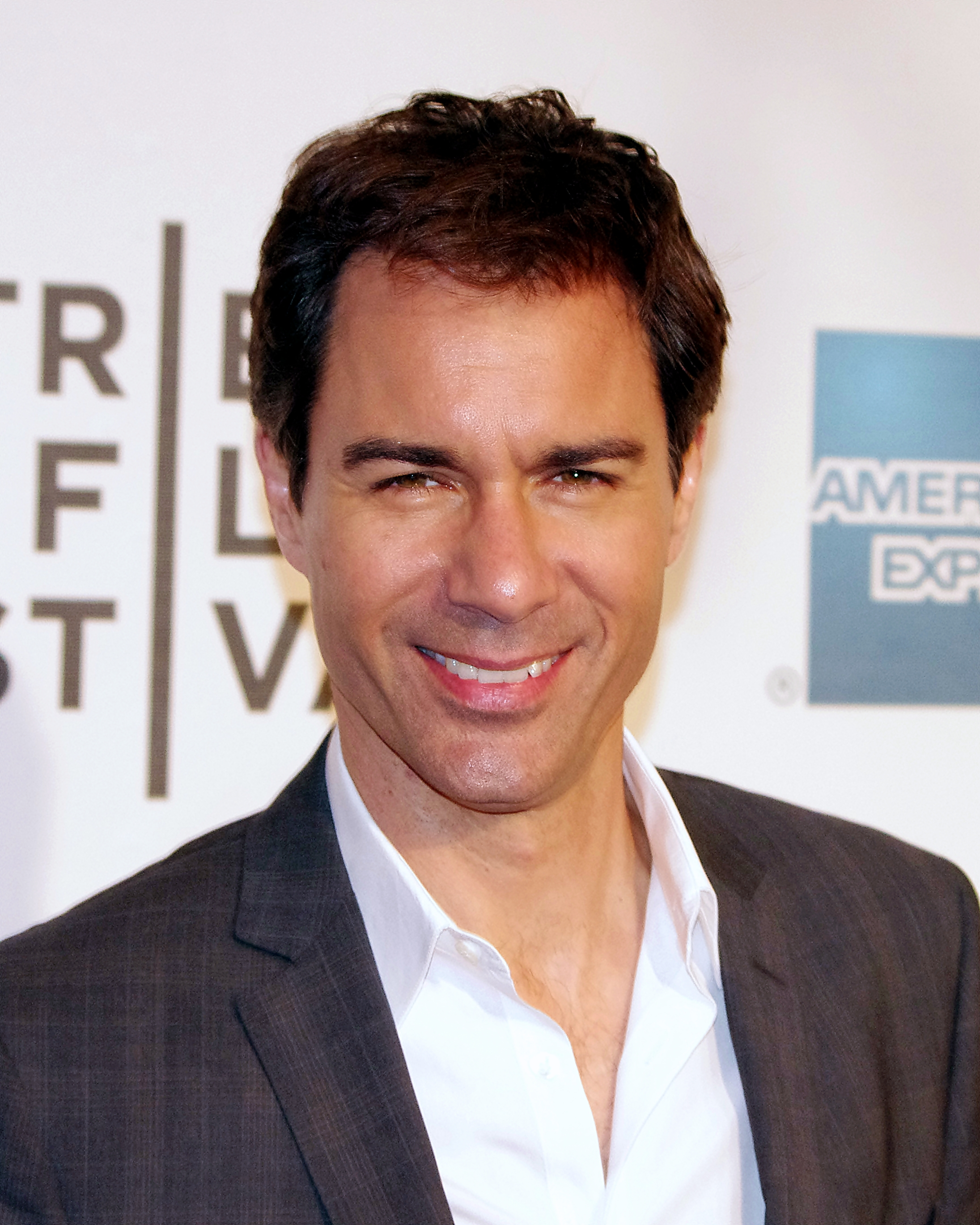
- McCormack at the 2012 Tribeca Film Festival premiere of Knife Fight
- Born: Eric James McCormack; April 18, 1963 (age 63); Toronto, Ontario, Canada
- Citizenship: Canadian (1963–present); American (1999–present)
- Occupations: Actor; singer; producer; writer
- Years active: 1986–present
- Spouse: Janet Holden (m. 1997; div. 2025)
- Children: 1

Eric James McCormack (born April 18, 1963) is a Canadian-American actor and singer. He is known for his roles as Will Truman in the NBC sitcom Will & Grace, Grant MacLaren in Netflix's Travelers, and Dr. Daniel Pierce in the TNT crime drama Perception. Born in Toronto, McCormack started acting by performing in high school plays. He left Ryerson Polytechnical Institute in 1985 to accept a position with the Stratford Shakespeare Festival, where he spent five years performing in many stage productions.

During the late 1990s, he lived in Los Angeles and had minor roles. He made his feature film debut in the 1992 science-fiction adventure film The Lost World. McCormack appeared in several television series including Top Cops, Street Justice, Lonesome Dove: The Series, Townies, and Ally McBeal. He later gained worldwide recognition for playing Will Truman in Will & Grace, which premiered in September 1998. His performance has earned him six Golden Globe nominations and four Emmy nominations, winning the Primetime Emmy Award for Outstanding Lead Actor in a Comedy Series in 2001.

Aside from appearing in television, he made his Broadway debut in the 2001 production of The Music Man and starred in the 2005 film The Sisters. Following the series conclusion of Will & Grace in 2006, McCormack starred as the leading role in the New York production of Some Girl(s). He starred in the television miniseries The Andromeda Strain (2008) and returned to television in 2009 in the TNT drama Trust Me, which was cancelled after one season.

Also in 2009, McCormack was cast in the science-fiction movie Alien Trespass. In addition, he starred as Dr. Daniel Pierce for three seasons of the TNT crime drama Perception and provided the voice of "Lucky" on The Hub's Pound Puppies. From 2009 to 2010 he starred as Dr. Max Kershaw, the psychiatrist turned boyfriend of Julia Louis-Dreyfus' title character in The New Adventures of Old Christine. In 2021, McCormack joined the cast of Departure. In 2023, he performed on Broadway in The Cottage.

== Early life ==
McCormack was born in Toronto, Ontario, the son of Doris (1932–2006), a homemaker, and James "Keith" McCormack, an oil company financial analyst who died from cancer in 2008. He is the eldest of three siblings. McCormack has Scottish ancestry. While he was growing up, he was shy and did not play sports but was involved in theatre from an early age: "I was a bit of an outsider, but I discovered theatre very early on, which got me through." He later attended Sir John A. Macdonald Collegiate Institute in Scarborough, Ontario, where he was a classmate of both Mike Myers and David Furnish. He enrolled in theatre classes there and performed in high school productions of Godspell and Pippin. McCormack recalls that after performing in Godspell, his feelings toward becoming an actor solidified and he decided to pursue a career in acting. "I remember after the first performance of that... I knew where to fit in. That was the beginning of my life as an actor. It changed me in that the concept of any other options disappeared. From that moment there was no question. I knew exactly what I was going to do. I'm lucky that way."

McCormack graduated from high school in 1982 and enrolled at Ryerson University School of Theatre in Toronto to further develop as an actor. He left Ryerson in 1985, several months before graduating, to accept a position with the Stratford Shakespeare Festival in Stratford, Ontario where he spent five seasons performing. "It was all I wanted, to be a classical actor for the rest of my life, but during the last couple of years I was there, I started to realise that it wasn't for me. Perhaps I didn't have to give my Hamlet before I died, that the world might be an OK place without my Hamlet, in fact." He appeared in productions of A Midsummer Night's Dream, Henry V, Murder in the Cathedral and Three Sisters. He later performed with the Manitoba Theatre Centre in a production of Burn This, as well as with Toronto's Royal Alexandra Theatre in Biloxi Blues.

== Career ==
=== Early work ===
McCormack made his Canadian television debut in the 1986 movie The Boys from Syracuse. McCormack moved to Los Angeles and made his television debut in the United States in a 1991 episode of the CBS crime series Top Cops. He appeared in the 1992 theatrical films The Lost World, based on Conan Doyle's novel of the same name and in its sequel, Return to the Lost World, also released in 1992. By 1993, he landed a recurring role as a detective in the crime drama Street Justice. Also in 1993, McCormack appeared in the television movie Double, Double, Toil and Trouble, playing Mary-Kate and Ashley Olsen's father.

He played the role of Colonel Francis Clay Mosby in 42 episodes of the Western television series Lonesome Dove: The Series (1994), which was later renamed Lonesome Dove: The Outlaw Years (1995). McCormack commented that it was a "fantastic role". In an interview with The Guardian in 2003, he admitted to auditioning "two or three times" for the part of Ross Geller for the situation comedy Friends, which ultimately went to David Schwimmer. In 1995, he appeared in the television film The Man Who Wouldn't Die. He was cast in the 1997 made-for-television movie Borrowed Hearts, where he portrayed a selfish businessman who learns to love, and in the HBO film Exception to the Rule, in which he played a cheating husband.

Also in 1997, he had minor roles in the comedy shows Townies, Veronica's Closet, and Ally McBeal. Originally, McCormack was scheduled to appear as a series regular in the NBC sitcom Jenny, but was fired after the pilot due to the network cutting his character. In addition McCormack had a recurring role in season five of the comedy series The New Adventures of Old Christine, in which he played a therapist and love interest for Julia Louis-Dreyfus's character, Christine.

=== Will & Grace ===
McCormack received his breakthrough role in 1998 when he was cast as gay lawyer Will Truman on the NBC sitcom Will & Grace. McCormack said that when the part came along, he was convinced he was right for the role. "At the end of the audition, Max Mutchnick, co-creator and executive producer of the show said 'That was perfect. Just to let you know, you never have to be more gay than that.'" He explained that when he first read the script, "what hit me immediately was that this was me. I mean, sexual orientation aside, Will was so much like me. He's a great host, he's relatively funny and he has great friends and he's a good friend to them... the gay issue just wasn't really a big thing." The show debuted on September 21, 1998, and was watched by almost 8.6 million American viewers. Will & Grace quickly developed a loyal audience, with the show and McCormack receiving strong reviews. John Carman of the San Francisco Chronicle commented that McCormack and costar Debra Messing (who played Will's best friend Grace Adler) worked "nicely" together. Kay McFadden of The Seattle Times also praised McCormack, Messing, and the supporting cast as "very funny". For the performance, he earned four Emmy Award nominations (2000, 2001, 2003, 2005), one of which resulted in a win (2001), for Outstanding Lead Actor in a Comedy Series. In addition, he received five Golden Globe Award nominations.

Also in 1998, McCormack appeared in Stephen Herek's comedy film Holy Man. The film was critically and financially unsuccessful. The next year he starred in the comedy movie Free Enterprise (1999), a movie about two filmmakers (McCormack and Rafer Weigel) obsessed with actor William Shatner and Star Trek. Film critic Kevin Thomas of the Los Angeles Times wrote that McCormack and Weigel "both make a strong impression". In 2000, McCormack appeared in the ABC television movie The Audrey Hepburn Story, portraying actor Mel Ferrer.

During the 2001 Broadway season, McCormack briefly portrayed Professor Harold Hill (replacing Craig Bierko) in the Susan Stroman revival of The Music Man at the Neil Simon Theatre. In August 2002, as part of the Hollywood Bowl's summer concert series, he reprised the role of Harold Hill for a one-night only appearance in which he and other actors recreated the songs from the production. McCormack hosted the fourth episode of the 28th season of the sketch comedy show Saturday Night Live on November 2, 2002. In 2004, he had a recurring role as Ray Summers on Showtime's comedy drama Dead Like Me. The following year, McCormack starred in the film The Sisters, based on Anton Chekhov's play Three Sisters. The film premiered at the 2005 Tribeca Film Festival.

Will & Grace's eighth season ended with the series finale on May 18, 2006. The finale garnered 18 million American viewers. In January 2017, NBC closed a deal for a new, 10-episode season of Will & Grace during the 2017–18 season. The new show has been branded as a "reboot", or "revival", taking place 11 years after the original series' finale episode, with McCormack reprising his role of Truman. In August 2017 it was extended again to 16 episodes, and a second 13-episode season was ordered. In March 2018, NBC ordered five more episodes for the revival's second season, bringing the total to 18 episodes, and also renewed the show for an 18-episode third season. Eric McCormack continued his role of Will Truman for all of the announced seasons of the revival.

=== After Will & Grace ===
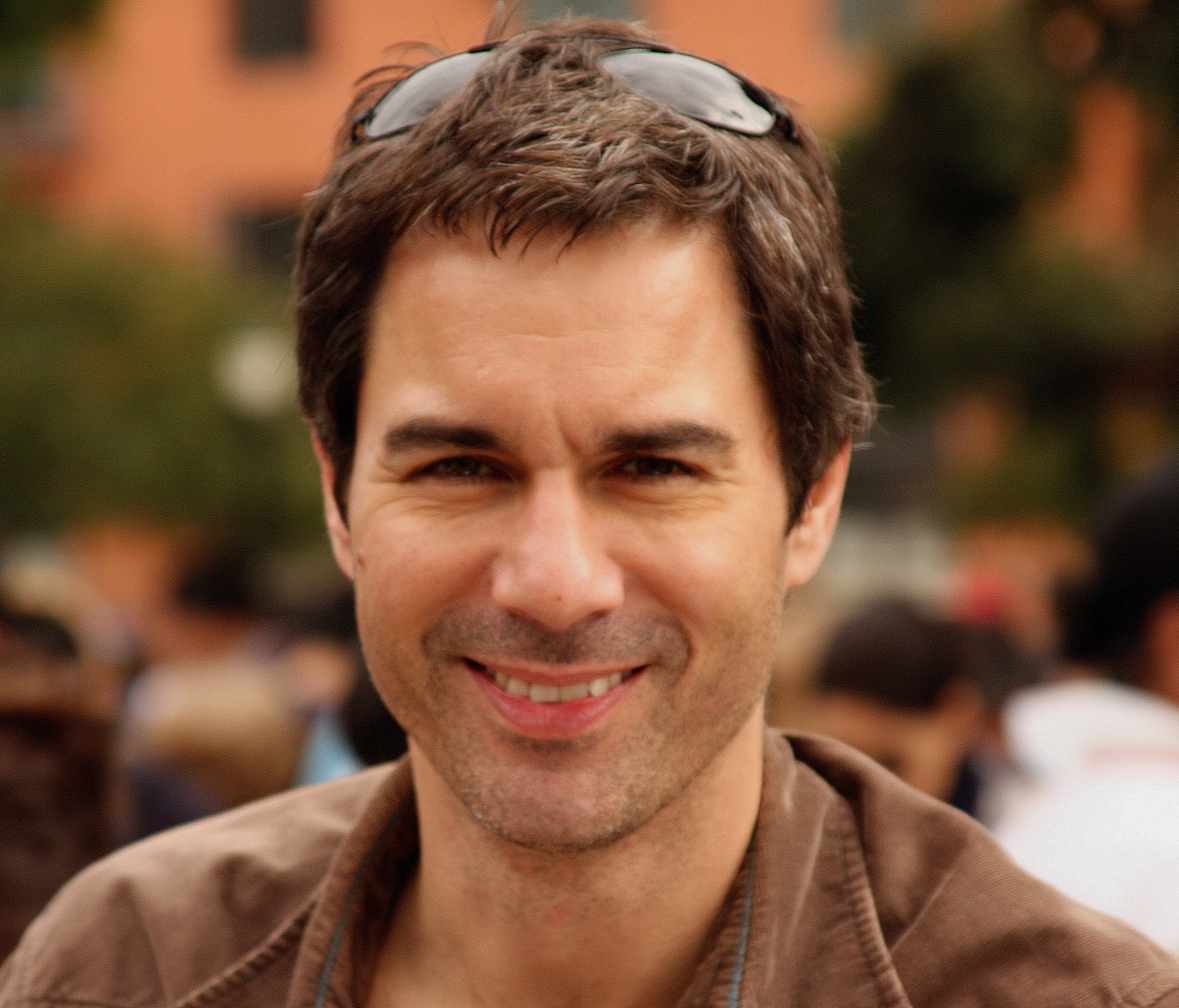
McCormack in November 2008

After Will & Grace ended McCormack starred on the New York stage opposite Fran Drescher, Judy Reyes, Brooke Smith, and Maura Tierney in Neil LaBute's off-Broadway play Some Girl(s) at the Lucille Lortel Theatre. For his performance, McCormack received critical reviews. New York Times contributor Ben Brantley, in review of the production, wrote: "Playing a thoughtless, woman-despising heterosexual, Mr. McCormack isn't much different from when he was playing a thoughtful, woman-worshiping homosexual. As in Will & Grace, he italicizes every other line for maximum comic spin and punctuates his dialogue by earnestly furrowing his features". Brantley went on to say that McCormack's interpretation of the character is "certainly a more slickly sustained performance" than the one delivered by David Schwimmer in 2005. Melissa Rose Bernardo of Entertainment Weekly commented that McCormack and Tierney "have incredible chemistry".

In the same year, McCormack produced the Lifetime comedy Lovespring International, a show that revolves around six employees at Lovespring International, a dating agency located in California as an "elite Beverly Hills" company. The series debuted to ambivalent reviews, with Matthew Gilbert of The Boston Globe commenting that Lovespring International is "a lively little cable exercise in over-the-top characters, bad taste, satire, and political incorrectness." The show was cancelled that same year.

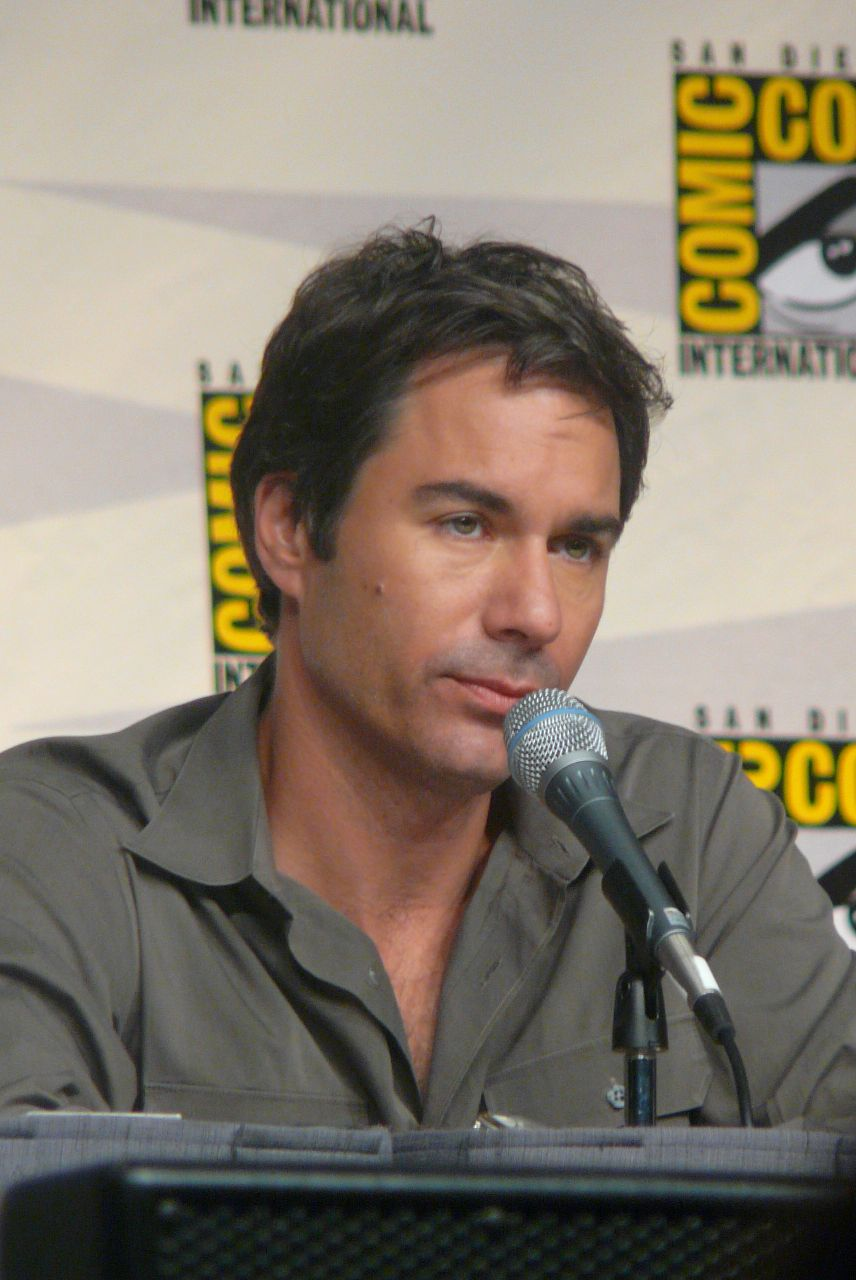
McCormack at San Diego Comic-Con in 2009

In 2008, McCormack co-starred in the A&E television miniseries The Andromeda Strain, a remake of the 1971 movie based on the novel by Michael Crichton. The Andromeda Strain received mixed reviews, and McCormack's performance was criticized. Joanna Weiss of the Boston Globe wrote, "The presence of Eric McCormack, as an intrepid TV reporter, is especially extraneous (no disrespect to intrepid reporters)." Robert Bianco of USA Today commented, "The central cast is completed by... poor Eric McCormack as a crusading, coke-addicted journalist who spends the second half of the movie playing Rambo in the desert. Let's just say McCormack does the best he can with what he's given, and leave it at that." On September 5, 2008, McCormack made a guest appearance in the seventh season and 100th episode of the television series Monk, where he played an unctuous host of a television crime docudrama.

In January 2009, McCormack returned to television in the TNT drama Trust Me, co-starring Tom Cavanagh. The series, set around a fictional advertising firm, starred McCormack as Mason McGuire who is the firm's newly promoted creative director, and deals with his best friend's (Cavanagh) unpredictable behavior. In an interview with USA Weekend, McCormack revealed he was not afraid of being typecast. His decision to do the show, he said, was due to "great writing". The show debuted on January 26, 2009, and was watched by almost 3.4 million viewers. Trust Me debuted to very positive reviews, with Tim Goodman of the San Francisco Chronicle writing that "the series is surprisingly solid." Mary McNamara of the Los Angeles Times wrote that McCormack and Cavanagh "manage to keep their characters sharply defined but low-key. They are opposites but not in an ash-smudged, Windex-wielding Felix and Oscar way." The series, however, was cancelled after one season due to poor ratings.

McCormack starred in the science-fiction film Alien Trespass (2009); he played Doctor Ted Lewis, who gets possessed by an alien marshal, Urp, after he crash-lands on Earth. When asked about his interpretation on the character, McCormack commented that his first instinct was to make Ted Lewis more alien, sounding like Spock. The film was critically and financially unsuccessful.

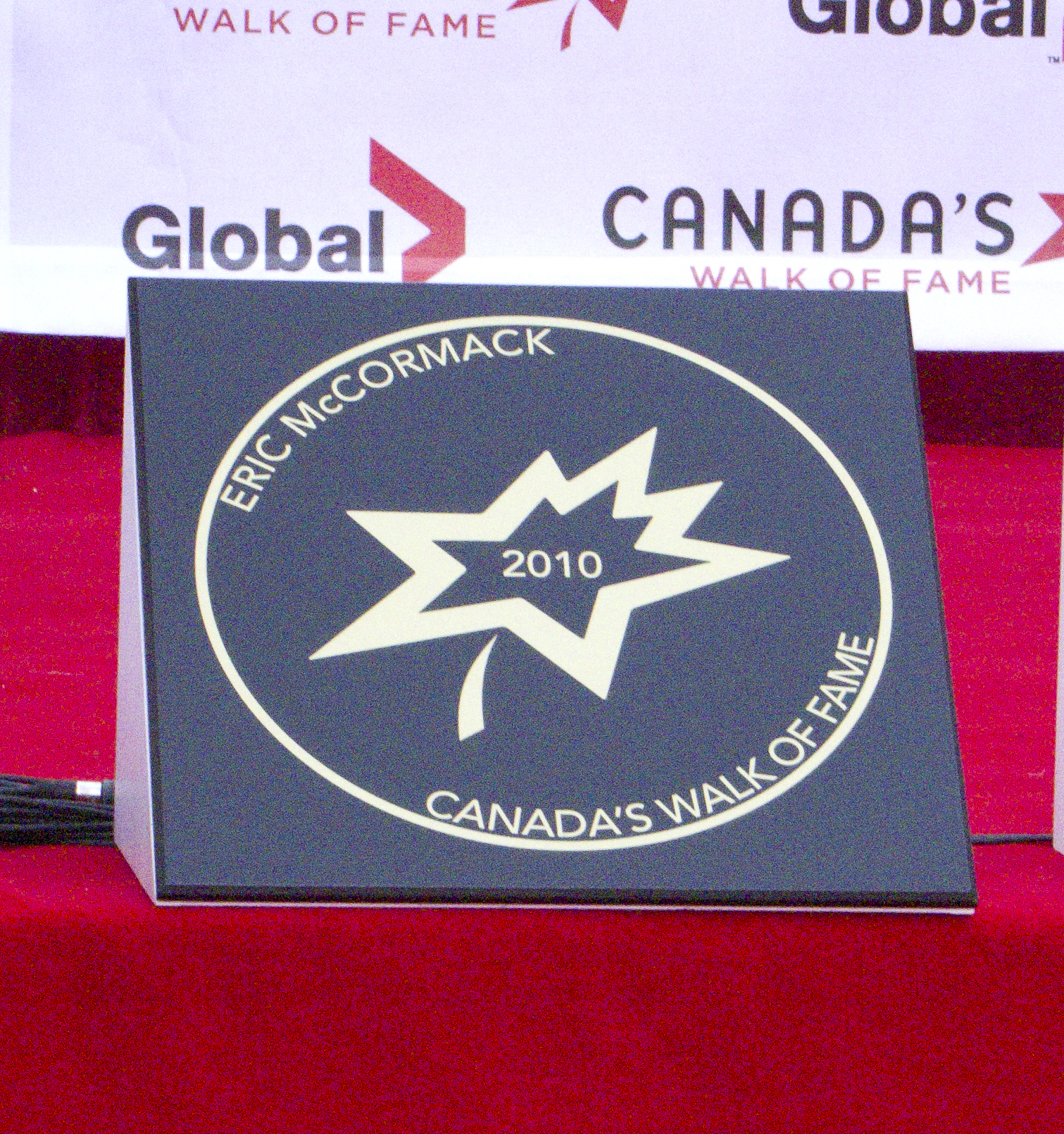
McCormack's star on Canada's Walk of Fame

In May 2009, he portrayed "El Gallo" in Reprise Theatre Company's revival of the 1960s musical The Fantasticks at UCLA's Freud Playhouse. McCormack had a supporting role in Richard Loncraine's comedy My One and Only, which was released in August 2009. On September 30, 2009, he guest-starred on the police procedural drama Law & Order: Special Victims Unit in the second episode of its 11th season playing an owner of a dating website.

McCormack portrayed con artist Clark Rockefeller in the Lifetime television movie Who Is Clark Rockefeller?, which premiered on March 13, 2010. Preparing for the role he read everything on the case, including coverage of the case and Rockefeller's jailhouse interview. Who Is Clark Rockefeller? received mixed reaction, but McCormack's performance was favored by critics, with Variety's Brian Lowry concluding that "the real kitsch factor resides in Eric McCormack's performance as the suave charmer, which adds an element of high camp to the proceedings."

In June 2010, McCormack received the NBC Universal Canada Award of Distinction at the Banff TV Festival. In October 2010, he received a star on Canada's Walk of Fame. In 2018, he received a star on the Hollywood Walk of Fame for his contributions to the television industry. In October 2010, it was reported that he would star in a new TNT television drama, Perception, playing a crime-solving neuroscientist named Dr. Daniel Pierce, who works with the federal government to solve cases using his knowledge and imaginative view of the world. Perception premiered on July 9, 2012. McCormack also serves as producer for the show. He also provides the voice of "Lucky" on The Hub's Pound Puppies series, which premiered October 10, 2010.

From March 6 through July 8, 2012, he played the role of Senator Joseph Cantwell in the Broadway revival of Gore Vidal’s The Best Man. In February 2015, he guest-starred on an episode of NBC's The Mysteries of Laura which stars Debra Messing, his former co-star on Will & Grace. He starred in Travelers, a science fiction drama which first aired in October 2016 and ran for three seasons.

In 2020, he narrated a portion of the 8th Canadian Screen Awards. In 2022, McCormack was cast in the fifth season of the Shudder horror series Slasher and the first season of the Hulu mystery thriller series The Other Black Girl, which both premiered the following year.

In 2025, he guest-starred in the season 2 premiere of NBC's The Hunting Party as serial killer Ron Simms. His son, Finnigan McCormack, played a younger version of the character.

== Other projects ==
McCormack has set up his own production company called Big Cattle Productions to develop ideas for television. The projects produced by the company include Lovespring International and Imperfect Union. In 2003, it was confirmed that he would write, direct, and star in the romantic comedy What You Wish For.

McCormack recorded a song, "The Greatest Discovery", which was written by Elton John and Bernie Taupin in 1970, for the 2006 album Unexpected Dreams – Songs from the Stars. He also wrote and sang a song called "Living with Grace" for the 2004 soundtrack to Will & Grace with piano music provided by Barry Manilow.

== Personal life ==
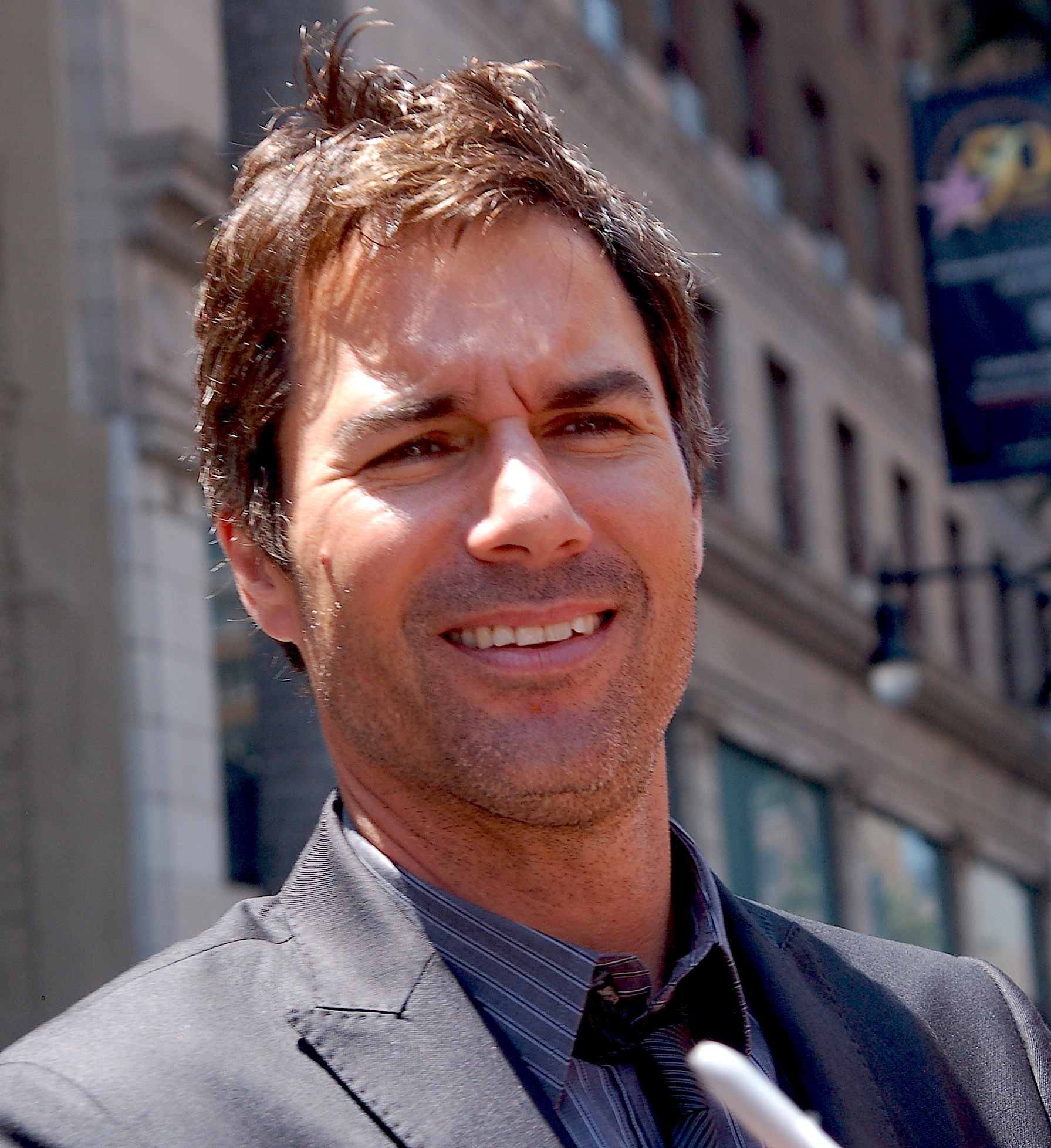
McCormack in May 2010

In August 1997, McCormack married Janet Leigh Holden, whom he met on the set of Lonesome Dove. On November 26, 2023, the couple filed for divorce. Their divorce was finalized in November 2025. In February 2025, McCormack began dating Sue Conder.

They have a son named Finnigan (born 2002), a nod to Mr. Dressup, as Eric states in the documentary, Mr. Dressup: The Magic of Make Believe (2023) airing on Prime Video. McCormack maintains residences in Los Angeles and Vancouver. He became an American citizen in 1999 and holds dual Canadian and American citizenship.

McCormack is involved in many Los Angeles and Canadian-based charitable organizations including Project Angel Food. The Wellness Community West Los Angeles Tribute to the Human Spirit Awards dinner presented an award to McCormack for his breast cancer awareness advocacy. He shared with the audience how his comedy helped his mother, Doris McCormack, endure her breast cancer treatments. Doris McCormack was honored at the Lifetime's Breast Cancer Heroes Luncheon in 2004. He serves as an honorary board member of the Multiple Myeloma Research Foundation (MMRF) and was given the MMRF Spirit of Hope Award in October 2006.

McCormack sang both the American and Canadian national anthems at the 2004 NHL All-Star game in St Paul, Minnesota. He is a supporter of same-sex marriage and attended a march in Fresno, California, on May 30, 2009, after the Supreme Court of California upheld a ban on same-sex marriage approved by voters in November by ballot Proposition 8. McCormack is a Democrat.

== Filmography ==
=== Film ===
Year	Title	Role	Notes
1992	The Lost World	Edward Malone	
1992	Return to the Lost World	Edward Malone	
1992	Giant Steps	Jack Sims	
1993	Double, Double, Toil and Trouble	Don Farmer	
1993	Call of the Wild	Hal	
1993	Family of Strangers	Sam	
1993	Miracle on I-880	Tony	
1997	Exception to the Rule	Timothy Bayer	
1997	Borrowed Hearts	Sam Field	
1998	Holy Man	Scott Hawkes	
1999	Free Enterprise	Mark	
2000	Here's to Life!	Owen Rinard	
2005	Break a Leg	Dark Haired Actor	
2005	The Sisters	Gary Sokol	
2008	Immigrants	Vlad	
2009	Best Thing Ever	Dean	
2009	Alien Trespass	Ted Lewis/Urp	
2009	My One and Only	Charlie	
2010	Who Is Clark Rockefeller?	Clark Rockefeller	
2011	Textuality	Clive	
2012	Barricade	Terrence Shade	
2012	Knife Fight	Larry Becker	
2013	Romali Series	Rufus, Erskine I and the Principal	
2016	Considering Love and Other Magic	Uncle Jasper	
2016	The Architect	Colin	
2016	A Heavenly Christmas	Max Wingford	
2021	Drinkwater	Hank	

=== Television ===
Year	Title	Role	Notes
1986	The Boys from Syracuse	Tailor's Apprentice	Television film
1987	Hangin' In	Jody	Episode: "Li'l Devil"
1988	Much Ado About Nothing	Balthasar	Television film
1990–1991	E.N.G.	Consultant	2 episodes
1990–1991	Street Legal	Cal/Barry Taylor	2 episodes
1991	Rin Tin Tin: K-9 Cop	David Baxter	Episode: "The Fugitive"
1992	The Hat Squad	Reg Flynn	Episode: "Ten"
1992	Call of the Wild	Hal	Television film
1992	Neon Rider	Derek	Episode: "A Perfect 10"
1992–1993	The Commish	Ted Eckels/Officer Danny Nolan	2 episodes
1992–1993	Street Justice	Det. Eric Rothman	12 episodes
1993	Relentless: Mind of a Killer	Stu Feltzer	Television film
1993	Family of Strangers	Sam	Television film
1993	Miracle on Interstate 880	Tony	Television film
1993	Double, Double, Toil and Trouble	Don Farmer	Television film
1993	Cobra	Blake Devaroe	Episode: "I'd Die for You"
1993	Silk Stalkings	Michael O'Hara	Episode: "Ladies Night Out"
1994	Island City	Greg 23	Television film
1994	The Man Who Wouldn't Die	Jack Sullivan	Television film
1994–1996	Lonesome Dove: The Series	Col. Francis Clay Mosby	Main cast; 43 episodes
1996	Highlander: The Series	Matthew McCormick	Episode: "Manhunt"
1996	Diagnosis: Murder	Boyd Merrick	Episode: "An Explosive Murder"
1996	Townies	Scott	4 episodes
1997	The Outer Limits	John Virgil	Episode: "Tempests"
1997	Jenny	Jason Slade	Episode: "Pilot"
1997	Borrowed Hearts	Sam Field	Television film
1997	Veronica's Closet	Griffin	Episode: "Veronica's Brotherly Love"
1998	Ally McBeal	Kevin Kepler	Episode: "Being There"
1998	A Will of Their Own	Pierce Peterson	2 episodes
1998–2006, 2017–2020	Will & Grace	Will Truman	Main cast; 246 episodes
2000	The Audrey Hepburn Story	Mel Ferrer	Television film
2002	Saturday Night Live	Host	Episode: "Eric McCormack/Jay-Z"
2003	Primetime Glick	Himself	Episode: "Eric McCormack/Jack Black"
2004	Dead Like Me	Ray Summers	3 episodes
2006	Lovespring International	Roman	Episode: "Lydia's Perfect Man"
2008	The Andromeda Strain	Jack Nash	4 episodes
2008	Monk	James Novak	Episode: "Mr. Monk's 100th Case"
2009	Trust Me	Mason McGuire	Main cast; 13 episodes
2009	Law & Order: Special Victims Unit	Vance Shepard	Episode: "Sugar"
2009–2010	The New Adventures of Old Christine	Max Kershaw	6 episodes
2009, 2022	Hell's Kitchen	Himself	2 episodes
2010	Who Is Clark Rockefeller?	Clark Rockefeller	Television film
2010–2013	Pound Puppies	Lucky/Various (voice)	Main cast; 65 episodes
2012	American Dad!	Swinger	Episode: "Killer Vacation"
2012–2015	Perception	Dr. Daniel Pierce	Main cast; 39 episodes
2013	Robot Chicken	Various (voice)	Episode: "Robot Fight Accident"
2013	Romeo Killer: The Chris Porco Story	Detective Joe Sullivan	Television film
2015	The Mysteries of Laura	Andrew Devlin, M.D.	Episode: "The Mystery of the Exsanguinated Ex"
2015	Full Circle	Ken Waltham	7 episodes
2016	A Heavenly Christmas	Max	Television film
2016–2018	Travelers	Grant MacLaren	Main cast; 34 episodes
2018	The Joel McHale Show with Joel McHale	Himself	Episode: "Roller Coaster?"
2019	Atypical	Professor Shinerock	3 episodes
2023	Slasher	Basil Garvey	Main cast; 8 episodes
2023	The Other Black Girl	Richard Wagner	Main cast; 10 episodes
2023	Guiding Emily	Garth (voice)	Television film
2025	Elsbeth	Tom Murphy	Episode: "Unalive and Well"
2025	Nine Bodies in a Mexican Morgue	Kevin Anderson	Main cast; 6 episodes
2025	Hell Motel	Hemmingway	2 Episodes
2026	The Hunting Party	Ron Simms	Episode: "Ron Simms"
2026	Love, Again	Leo	Television film
2026	The Dressing Room	Himself	Episode: "The Telephone Hour"

== Stage ==
Year	Title	Role(s)	Company/Venue(s)	Notes	Ref.
1985	Murder in the Cathedral	performer	Stratford Festival		
1985	Twelfth Night	understudy	Stratford Festival		
1986	Pericles	3rd Knight, 2nd Gentleman	Stratford Festival		
1986	Cymbeline	1st Lord to Cloten, 2nd Jailer	Stratford Festival		
1986	The Boys from Syracuse	Tailor's Apprentice	Stratford Festival		
1987	Troilus and Cressida	Helenus	Stratford Festival		
1987	Much Ado About Nothing	Balthasar	Stratford Festival		
1988	Richard III	Messenger	Stratford Festival		
1988	All's Well That Ends Well	Dumain (Younger)	Stratford Festival		
1988	Measure for Measure	performer	Stratford Festival		
1989	Henry V	Orleans	Stratford Festival		
1989	Three Sisters	Tuzenbach	Stratford Festival		
1989	A Midsummer Night's Dream	Demetrius	Stratford Festival		
2001	The Music Man	Harold Hill (replacement)	Neil Simon Theatre	Broadway debut	
2006	Some Girl(s)	Guy	Lucille Lortel Theatre		
2009	The Fantasticks	El Gallo	Reprise Theatre Company		
2012	The Best Man	Sen. Joseph Cantwell	Gerald Schoenfeld Theatre		
2023	The Cottage	Beau	Helen Hayes Theatre		
2024	Wild About You	Michael	Theatre Royal, Drury Lane		

== Podcast series ==
Year	Title	Role	Notes
2023-present	Just Jack and Will	Himself	Main cast; 45 episodes
2024	Still Here Hollywood Podcast	Himself	1 Episode
2025-present	Middlebridge Mysteries	Professor Bellows	Main cast; 12 episodes

== Awards and nominations ==
Year	Award	Category	Series	Result	Ref.
1999	Viewers For Quality Television Awards	Best Actor in a Quality Comedy Series	Will & Grace	Nominated	
1999	OFTA Awards	Best Actor in a New Comedy Series	Will & Grace	Nominated	
1999	OFTA Awards	Best Actor in a Comedy Series	Will & Grace	Won	
2000	Leo Awards	Leo Award for Best Actor – Motion Picture Drama	Here's to Life!	Nominated	
2000	Emmy Awards	Outstanding Lead Actor in a Comedy Series	Will & Grace	Nominated	
2000	Golden Globe Award	Best Actor in a Television Series Musical or Comedy	Will & Grace	Nominated	
2000	Satellite Awards	Best Actor in a Television Series Musical or Comedy	Will & Grace	Nominated	
2000	Viewers For Quality Television Awards	Best Actor in a Quality Comedy Series	Will & Grace	Nominated	
2000	OFTA Awards	Best Actor in a Comedy Series	Will & Grace	Nominated	
2001	Emmy Awards	Outstanding Lead Actor in a Comedy Series	Will & Grace	Won	
2001	Golden Globe Award	Best Actor in a Television Series Musical or Comedy	Will & Grace	Nominated	
2001	Screen Actors Guild Award	Screen Actors Guild Award for Outstanding Performance by an Ensemble in a Comedy Series	Will & Grace	Won	
2001	Teen Choice Award	Television Choice Actor	Will & Grace	Nominated	
2001	TV Guide Awards	Actor of the Year in a Comedy Series	Will & Grace	Nominated	
2001	OFTA Awards	Best Actor in a Comedy Series	Will & Grace	Won	
2002	Golden Globe Award	Best Actor in a Television Series Musical or Comedy	Will & Grace	Nominated	
2002	Satellite Awards	Best Performance by an Actor in a Series, Comedy or Musical	Will & Grace	Nominated	
2002	Screen Actors Guild Award	Outstanding Performance by an Ensemble in a Comedy Series	Will & Grace	Nominated	
2002	OFTA Awards	Best Actor in a Comedy Series	Will & Grace	Nominated	
2003	Emmy Awards	Outstanding Lead Actor in a Comedy Series	Will & Grace	Nominated	
2003	Golden Globe Award	Best Actor in a Television Series Musical or Comedy	Will & Grace	Nominated	
2003	Satellite Awards	Best Performance by an Actor in a Series, Comedy or Musical	Will & Grace	Nominated	
2003	Screen Actors Guild Award	Outstanding Performance by an Ensemble in a Comedy Series	Will & Grace	Nominated	
2003	OFTA Awards	Best Actor in a Comedy Series	Will & Grace	Nominated	
2003	GLAAD Media Awards	Vanguard Award		Won	
2004	Golden Globe Award	Best Actor in a Television Series Musical or Comedy	Will & Grace	Nominated	
2004	Satellite Awards	Best Performance by an Actor in a Series, Comedy or Musical	Will & Grace	Nominated	
2004	Screen Actors Guild Award	Outstanding Performance by an Ensemble in a Comedy Series	Will & Grace	Nominated	
2005	Emmy Awards	Outstanding Lead Actor in a Comedy Series	Will & Grace	Nominated	
2005	Screen Actors Guild Award	Outstanding Performance by an Ensemble in a Comedy Series	Will & Grace	Nominated	
2005	Gold Derby TV Awards	Comedy Lead Actor	Will & Grace	Nominated	
2005	Dixie Film Festival	Festival Prize	The Sisters	Won	
2006	Gold Derby TV Awards	Comedy Lead Actor	Will & Grace	Nominated	
2014	Prism Awards	Performance in a Drama Series Episode	Perception	Nominated	
2014	Behind the Voice Actors Awards	Best Vocal Ensemble in a Television Series - Children's/Educational	Pound Puppies	Nominated	
2018	Golden Globe Award	Best Actor in a Television Series Musical or Comedy	Will & Grace	Nominated	
2018	Gold Derby Awards	Comedy Lead Actor	Will & Grace	Nominated	
2024	Broadway.com Audience Awards	Favorite Lead Actor in a Play	The Cottage	Nominated	
