= Return to the Lost World =

- DVD cover
- Directed by: Timothy Bond
- Written by: Harry Alan Towers
- Produced by: Frank Agrama; Norman Siderow; Daniele Lorenzano
- Starring: John Rhys-Davies; Eric McCormack; David Warner; Nathania Stanford
- Cinematography: Paul Beeson
- Edited by: Stephen Lawrence
- Music by: Isaiah Sanders; Gerard Shadrick; Lawrence Shragge; Larry Wolff
- Distributed by: Harmony Gold; Silvio Berlusconi Communications
- Release date: March 9, 1992
- Running time: 99 minutes
- Country: Canada
- Language: English

Return to the Lost World is a 1992 film directed by Timothy Bond and starring John Rhys-Davies, Eric McCormack, David Warner, Nathania Stanford, Darren Peter Mercer, and Tamara Gorski. It is a sequel to the film The Lost World, which was released the same year.

== Plot ==
Belgian scientist Bertram Hammonds, along with Gomez, who survived being injured in the first film, arrives in the Lost World to drill for crude oil. He and his men begin capturing the natives for slave labor, throwing Chief Palala off the top of the plateau. He survives and is rescued by Malu and taken to a nearby village. Word reaches Edward Malone and Jenny Nielson in England, who remind Professors Challenger and Summerlee of the promise they made to Palala: that they would return to the Lost World should they be needed.

However the professors are having a feud. Challenger recently discredited Summerlee on a theory and now they aren't on speaking terms. With help from Jim, Malone and Jenny manage to bamboozle Challenger and Summerlee into coming along with each mistakenly believing they are commanding the expedition while the other is remaining in England. When they encounter one another aboard the steamship bound for Africa, they nearly come to blows. Upon arriving they are led to the base of the plateau by Malu, where she found Chief Palala.

Above, attacks by dinosaurs have set back Hammonds' work. His drilling crews accidentally tap into a volcanic pipe during a tyrannosaurus' visit, triggering a volcanic eruption that threatens to destroy the whole plateau. The initial eruption destroys the plane they arrived in. Fleeing, Hammonds and Gomez take Chief Palala's daughter hostage and threaten to kill her unless the natives show them how to leave. Suddenly Challenger and the others arrive, having come the same way they left last time, through the caves.

Challenger shoots and kills Gomez, and Hammonds is taken prisoner. After several adventures including clashes with the hostile drilling crew members, the group struggles to stop the erupting volcano. Challenger creates a new explosive, "Challengerite," with which to seal the volcano. Boxes of the explosive are put into a cave nearby but Hammonds chases Jim inside, not wanting them to set off the explosives. He tries to ply Jim with promises of wealth but Jim sets off the explosives, stopping the eruption and seemingly killing Hammonds in the process.

Afterward, Summerlee congratulates Challenger on the Challengerite, and they muse on how much longer they can keep the Lost World safe from human intervention.

== Cast ==
- John Rhys-Davies as Professor George Edward Challenger
- David Warner as Professor Summerlee
- Eric McCormack as Edward Malone
- Nathania Stanford as Malu
- Darren Peter Mercer as Jim
- Tamara Gorski as Jenny Nielson
- Sala Came as Dan
- Fidelis Cheza as Chief Palala
- John Chinosiyani as Witch Doctor
- Innocent Choda as Pujo
- Brian Cooper as Policeman
- Charles David as Mojo Porter
- Kate Egan as Kate Crenshaw
- Mike Grey as Mojo Porter
- Robert Haber as Maple White
- Ian Yule as Peterson

== Production ==
=== Filming ===
Filming for Return to the Lost World took place simultaneously with its predecessor The Lost World. The movie was filmed during 1991 in Zimbabwe.

== Reception ==
The movie was released on March 9, 1992 in Canada.

=== Critical reception ===
The film Return to the Lost World was generally negative reviews upon release.

TV Guide called it " essentially a retread of the slightly superior first picture".

== Relation to novel ==
The films 1992 predecessor The Lost World was based on the 1912 book of the same name by Sir Arthur Conan Doyle. The sequel Return to the Lost World is a continuation from The Lost World and contains its own story elements and plot that was not in the original novel.

== See also ==
- List of films featuring dinosaurs
