= A Heavenly Christmas =

- Written by: Gregg McBride
- Directed by: Paul Shapiro
- Starring: Kristin Davis; Eric McCormack; Shirley MacLaine
- Theme music composer: Michael Richard Plowman
- Country of origin: United States
- Original language: English

Production
- Producer: Harvey Kahn
- Cinematography: Randal Platt
- Editor: Jesse Lyon
- Running time: 93 minutes

Original release
- Network: Hallmark Channel
- Release: November 26, 2016

A Heavenly Christmas is a 2016 American television film starring Kristin Davis, Eric McCormack and Shirley MacLaine.

== Plot ==
Eve Morgan is a work-focused woman who has pushed aside most other aspects of her life to focus on a successful career. When she is killed in a fall close to Christmas, she is greeted by Pearl, an angel who reveals that Eve has been chosen to become a Christmas angel and help Max, a musician working as a fry cook who has been taking care of his niece since her parents died a few years ago. Eve is able to inspire Max to try out for an audition he recently missed, and even falls for him, but is taken away by Pearl who reveals that Eve's time as an angel was only temporary; Eve has been in a coma since the fall, Pearl explaining that she gave Eve the chance to be an angel to save her own life as well as give Eve a chance to help others. Eve wakes up with no conscious memory of her time as an angel, and those she has helped only remember her influence on them rather than remembering her specifically, but she takes the lessons she learnt to heart and works to be more connected to her brother and his family, even meeting Max under new circumstances. As Max and Eve "resume" their relationship, Pearl is shown watching them with Max's sister, who reveals that they arranged this to give Max a chance at happiness.

== Cast ==
- Kristin Davis as Eve Morgan
- Eric McCormack as Max
- Shirley MacLaine as Pearl
