= Stoned (ABC Afterschool Special) =

- ABC Afterschool Special episode
- Episode no.: Season 9 Episode 4
- Directed by: John Herzfeld
- Written by: John Herzfeld
- Original air date: November 12, 1980

"Stoned" is a 1980 episode of the American television anthology series ABC Afterschool Special, which aired on November 12, 1980 and starring Scott Baio. It was featured as the fourth episode in the program's ninth season.

== Plot ==
Jack Melon (Scott Baio) is a gangling and awkward teenage freshman who doesn't fit in at his local high school. Distracted by a new girl in school named Felicity (Largo Woodruff), Jack bumps into Teddy (Jeffrey Frichner), a classmate who is a reputed marijuana user and pusher. Teddy's drug habit is outed in the Spanish class that Jack and Teddy share. Mr. David (John Herzfeld in his major TV acting debut), the teacher, orders Teddy to stand up after catching him sleeping at his desk. Mr. David tells him "Don't come to class stoned!"

Later, Jack catches Teddy and Alan (Steve Monarque also in his major TV acting debut) smoking pot in the boys' room. Teddy offers him a chance to try it. Jack refuses. Alan teases him about his straight-laced older brother Mike (Vincent Bufano). Jack, asks Mike if he had ever tried pot. Mike says he didn't like it.

Jack looks up to his older brother, but is often ignored by their father (who heads a single parent household, who praises Mike for his athletic abilities while ignoring Jack.

An argument between the normally close brothers happens the day before a swim meet. Mike explodes and tells him to stop hanging around him.

The next day at school, Jack is again approached by Teddy, who takes the joint. He doesn't feel its effects. Teddy invites him to his home for the next morning, where he presents Jack with a bong. Jack gets high after a couple of hits. The experience leads to a friendship. Mr. David, noticing Jack's change in behavior, conducts class outside one day to teach his students about the dangers of marijuana. As with Teddy Mr. David outs Jack's obvious use of marijuana.

Felicity, who has noticed Jack's newfound sense of humor, now brushes him off. She recognize this isn't the real Jack. Jack's relationship deteriorates. Mike begins to notice the changes in his brother's behavior. Jack intercepts a letter from school addressed to his father about Jack's absenteeism. A confrontation erupts between the pair. Mike tries to mend fences.

Jack accepts the offer of a swim with his brother but smokes a joint prior to the outing. A boating accident occurs and endangers Mike. Jack jumps in the lake to rescue his now-unconscious brother.

Mike wakes up in the hospital with a broken nose and no memory of what had happened. Jack confesses that he had been stoned and accepts responsibility. His brother is furious at him for ruining his career as a competitive swimmer. Their father, bursting in, demands to know what happened. As Jack gets ready to tell their father the truth, Mike interrupts him. He lies about the accident to protect his brother and says that Jack saved his life.

The next day while walking to school, Jack refuses Teddy's offer of "dynamite new smoke", then approaches Felicity and lets her know that he's off pot for good, which she is happy to see. They walk down the path together in this final scene as friends.

== Tagline ==
"Jack is down and depressed. Getting stoned seems like the answer. Until someone almost gets killed."

== Awards ==
Scott Baio won a 1982 Young Artist Award for Best Young Actor in a Television Special for this work.
