= The Lost World (1992 film) =

1992 Canadian film

- DVD cover
- Directed by: Timothy Bond
- Written by: Marion Fairfax; Harry Alan Towers; Tim Kirk
- Based on: The Lost World; 1912 novel by Arthur Conan Doyle
- Produced by: Harry Alan Towers; Frank Agrama; Daniele Lorenzano; Norman Siderow
- Starring: John Rhys-Davies; Eric McCormack; David Warner; Nathania Stanford
- Cinematography: Paul Beeson
- Edited by: Stephen Lawrence
- Music by: Isaiah Sanders; Gerard Shadrick; Lawrence Shragge; Larry Wolff
- Release date: 9 February 1992
- Running time: 99 minutes
- Country: Canada
- Language: English

The Lost World is a 1992 film, based on the 1912 novel The Lost World by Sir Arthur Conan Doyle. The movie is set in Africa rather than the book's setting of South America, and the character of Lord John Roxton has been replaced with a female character played by Tamara Gorski (in her film debut). It was followed by a sequel the same year, Return to the Lost World, with the same director and main cast.

== Filming ==
The movie was filmed on location in the Mashonaland region of Zimbabwe. Ngoma kurira in Mashonaland East played the edge of the plateau. Many local actors were hired to play the native characters.

== Plot ==
The film opens on Edward Malone, a junior reporter looking for an adventurous assignment. Malone is sent to interview Professor Challenger, an explorer and researcher who believes he is on the trail of the "lost world," a mysterious place in Central Africa. Challenger has a picture of a cliff and a strange beast resembling a pterodactyl that is his only evidence of the place.

The British scientific community finds his claims laughable. After receiving funding from the family of Jenny Nielson, a wildlife photographer and the daughter of a rich American contributor to the sciences, the "scientific community" agrees to organise an exploratory expedition under the leadership of the antagonistic Professor Summerlee. Summerlee agrees to Malone and Nielson coming on the expedition, but refuses to allow Challenger to be part of the expedition. With obvious reluctance, Challenger gives Summerlee a "map" to be opened at a road-end village in Africa at a particular date and time. The expedition departs. A newsboy associate of Malone named Jim stows away on the trip.

The expedition arrives in Africa where they are joined by a female guide named Malu and a Portuguese called Gomez. Summerlee opens the map from Challenger, finding it blank, at which point Challenger appears from nowhere leaving Summerlee no option but to accept his guidance on the expedition. Under Challenger's guidance they find the cliff in the picture and reach the top, but Gomez (who turns out to be the brother of a Portuguese who was killed on Challenger's first journey here) strands them with no way back down. Exploring the Lost World to find another way home, the team finds dinosaurs, from a pair of Anatotitan to a pterodactyl rookery.

Jim, Malone, and Malu narrowly avoid being eaten by a dinosaur (presumably a Herrerasaurus), only to find that their camp was attacked and the rest of the team is gone. The three discover a gathering of native tribesmen (painted with symbolic skeletons) who regularly sacrifice humans off a cliff to the carnivorous dinosaurs. While the 'skeleton men' sacrifice a man to a Tyrannosaurus rex, Malone distracts the tribe while the other explorers and captured natives escape, and they retreat to the safety of a second tribe nearby (who use clothes, not paint). During these events, Summerlee notes some oddities about the "ritual" vegetation necklaces that the sacrifices (themselves) were dressed in. The second tribe's members, through Malu's translation, tell the explorers about a time long ago when the shamans of their tribe convinced some to worship the carnivorous dinosaurs, splitting the tribe in two.

Summerlee deduces that the vegetation necklaces placed on the sacrifices provided some necessary nutrient or immunisation to the dinosaurs which had protected these dinosaurs from the extinction that the rest of the dinosaurs suffered globally (this being a theory Summerlee had espoused previously). The expedition team uses their modern knowledge and research to benefit the tribe with irrigation and horticultural benefits, to produce the antidote to a prehistoric plague. The skeleton tribe's leader is killed, and the two tribes reunite. The chief shows the team a hidden cave that will lead them back to their world, and has them promise that they will come back if they are ever needed.

Returning to the river, the team is ambushed by Gomez. Gomez is shot and wounded, but instead of killing him, Challenger leaves him behind, saying, "Let the jungle have him." Malu stays in Africa, and the others return home. The Royal Zoological Society in London rules that Challenger and Summerlee have insufficient evidence of their tale, until Jim reveals that he brought back a baby pterodactyl. The team is celebrated for their achievements, but when Malone, Jenny, and Jim discover the pterodactyl (named Percival), is unhappy being kept in a zoo, they release him, allowing him to fly back to the "lost world".

== Cast ==
- John Rhys-Davies as Professor George Challenger
- David Warner as Professor Summerlee
- Eric McCormack as Edward Malone
- Nathania Stanford as Guide Malu
- Darren Peter Mercer as Jim
- Tamara Gorski as Jenny Nielson
- Sala Came as Dan
- Fidelis Cheza as Chief Palala
- John Chinosiyani as Witch Doctor
- Innocent Choga as Pujo
- Brian Cooper as Policeman
- Charles David as Mojo Porter
- Kate Egan as Kate Crenshaw
- Mike Grey as Mojo Porter
- Robert Haber as Maple White
- Geza Kovacs as Portuguese Gomez
- Ian Yule as Peterson

=== Dinosaurs ===
- Edmontosaurus (named Anatosaurus)
- Brachiosaurus
- Unknown predatory theropod (possibly Herrerasaurus)
- Pteranodon
- Tyrannosaurus rex

== See also ==
- List of films featuring dinosaurs
