= Houdin =

Houdin is a French surname. Notable people with the surname include:

- Jean Eugène Robert-Houdin (1805–1871), French watchmaker, magician, and illusionist
- Jean-Pierre Houdin (born 1951), French architect

== See also ==
- Houdini
