= Friday the 13th: The Series =

Fantasy horror television series (1987–1990)

- Also known as: Friday's Curse
- Genre: Supernatural horror
- Created by: Frank Mancuso Jr.; Larry B. Williams
- Directed by: David Winning
- Starring: John D. LeMay; Louise Robey; Steve Monarque; Chris Wiggins
- Composer: Fred Mollin
- Country of origin: United States
- Original language: English
- No. of seasons: 3
- No. of episodes: 72 (list of episodes)

Production
- Executive producer: Frank Mancuso Jr.
- Producer: Iain Paterson
- Cinematography: Rodney Charters
- Camera setup: Single-camera
- Running time: 45-46 minutes
- Production companies: Lexicon Productions; Triumph Entertainment Corporation; Variety Artists International; Hometown Films; Paramount Domestic Television

Original release
- Network: Syndication
- Release: October 3, 1987 – May 26, 1990

Related
- Friday the 13th (franchise)

Friday the 13th: The Series is an American television series that ran for three seasons, from October 3, 1987, to May 26, 1990, in first-run syndication. The series follows Micki (Louise Robey, simply credited as "Robey") and Ryan (John D. LeMay), cousins who inherit an antiques store; after selling all the antiques, they learn from Jack Marshak (Chris Wiggins) that the items are cursed. The trio then work together to recover the objects and return them to the safety of the shop's vault.

Originally, the series was to be titled The 13th Hour, but producer Frank Mancuso Jr. thought this would turn away viewers and instead took the name Friday the 13th to deliberately draw in audiences. Despite this title and the fact that it is officially considered a part of the franchise, the series has no story connections to the film series of the same title, as Jason Voorhees does not make an appearance, nor does any character connected to the films.

The series and the films have several cast and crew ties, however. Mancuso also produced the film series from Friday the 13th Part 2 (1981) until the final installment distributed by Paramount (Friday the 13th Part VIII: Jason Takes Manhattan in 1989, a year before the TV series ended). LeMay went on to star in Jason Goes to Hell: The Final Friday, guest star John Shepherd played Tommy Jarvis in Friday the 13th: A New Beginning, and episode director David Cronenberg appeared in Jason X. Fred Mollin, Rob Hedden, and Tom McLoughlin worked behind the scenes of both series.

== Premise ==
Season	Episodes	Originally released	
Season	Episodes	First released	Last released
1	26	October 3, 1987	July 30, 1988
2	26	September 30, 1988	June 17, 1989
3	20	October 7, 1989	May 26, 1990

Lewis Vendredi made a deal with the devil to sell cursed antiques. But he broke the pact, and it cost him his soul. Now, his niece Micki, and her cousin Ryan have inherited the store... and with it, the curse. Now they must get everything back, or the real terror begins.

— prologue that opened the first episode of the third season

An antique dealer named Lewis Vendredi (played by R. G. Armstrong; "Vendredi" means "Friday" in French) has made a deal with the Devil to sell cursed antiques out of his shop, "Vendredi's Antiques", in exchange for wealth, magic powers, and immortality. In the show's first episode ("The Inheritance"), tired of being merely an obedient puppet for the Devil, Lewis rebels against the Devil and breaks the deal, resulting in him being killed and having his soul claimed by the Devil.

After Lewis's death, his shop is inherited by his niece, Micki Foster (played by Louise Robey, credited without her first name, as "Robey") and her cousin, Ryan Dallion (played by John D. LeMay). They decide not to keep the store, and sell off many of the cursed antiques before being stopped by Jack Marshak (played by Chris Wiggins). Jack was Lewis's childhood friend, a retired stage magician, world traveller, and occultism expert who originally collected many of the antiques for Vendredi before they became cursed.

The series follows the protagonists as they hunt down the cursed antiques, which are usually in the possession of people who have discovered their magic powers and are unwilling to give them up. In some cases the object is in the possession of the one who originally discovers its magic power ("The Inheritance", "What a Mother Wouldn't Do"), while in others (e. g. "Tales of the Undead", "A Cup of Time", "Vanity's Mirror", "Read My Lips", "The Mephisto Ring", "The Prisoner") another person has learned of the object's power and obtained it before the object is recovered. Since the cursed antiques are completely indestructible, they must be locked away in the antique store's vault designed to magically render the objects inert. A manifest, written by Lewis, holds the records of all the cursed objects sold by him.

Most of the stories in the series deal with people using the cursed objects' magic for personal gain or for revenge. To use the objects' magic powers, a human sacrifice is required, and the victim must be killed by the object itself or in some particular manner related to the object's history. In many episodes, the benefits are only temporary and owner is forced to keep using the object to regain or retain them ("A Cup of Time", "Master of Disguise", "Spirit of Television", "Face of Evil", "Better Off Dead", "The Sweetest Sting"). In some cases, attempting to abandon the object subjects the owner to some unendurable or fatal affliction ("Stick It in Your Ear", "Read My Lips"). Some objects are sentient and intelligent, such as the doll ("The Inheritance") and the radio ("And Now the News"). Others do not actually speak but demonstrate intelligence and awareness in other ways ("Spirit of Television", "The Playhouse") or confer intelligence on other inanimate things ("Read My Lips", "Double Exposure", "Wax Magic"), or summon intelligent, malevolent entities ("The Pirate's Promise", "Femme Fatale", "Shadow Boxer", "Demon Hunter"). Still others function without intelligence, mechanically dispensing a certain benefit in response to human sacrifice ("Root of All Evil", "The Mephisto Ring", "The Prisoner", "Brain Drain"). Occasionally, there would be an object-free episode in which the trio would confront their uncle's spirit or some other Satanic evildoer ("The Prophecy", "Hellowe'en", "Wedding in Black").

Like other sci-fi/horror shows in syndication in the late 1980s (such as War of the Worlds and Freddy's Nightmares), Friday the 13th: The Series pushed the limits of "acceptable content", featuring violence on par with that of the R-rated horror movies of the time. Certain episodes such as "Night Prey" also depicted a level of sexuality that was taboo for network television.

The second season saw the introduction of Johnny Ventura (played by Steve Monarque). He helps recover the relics and eventually replaces Ryan permanently in the third season. A romantic interest between Johnny and Micki is hinted at, but not realized.

== Characters ==
=== Main ===
- Jack Marshak (played by Chris Wiggins)

Jack Marshak is a former stage magician and an expert in the occult. He has travelled all over the world and he has diverse skills including bartending ("Cupid's Quiver"), picking locks ("Root of All Evil", "Pipe Dream", "Brain Drain"), ornamental metalwork ("Poison Pen"), and forgery (ibid.). He has a great many peculiar old friends. In so far as the trio has a leader, he is it; the cousins often try to work without him but have to turn to him for aid ("Read My Lips", "Pipe Dream") and moral support ("Root of All Evil", "Face of Evil", "The Quilt of Hathor"). He renames the store "Curious Goods" ("The Inheritance").
Jack had been married once and had a clairvoyant son, Peter, who died in a young girl's dream plane ("Bottle of Dreams"). When Jack was younger, his father disappeared, only to return ten years later. However, the man who came back was a spirit ("Midnight Riders"). Jack served in World War II and nearly died in a Nazi death camp ("The Butcher"). He was engaged to a scientist, who left him to do field research in Kenya. She shows up in his life years later, but gets killed shortly after they get re-engaged ("Brain Drain").

- Micki Foster (played by Louise Robey)

Michelle "Micki" Foster inherits the store, which she co-owns with her cousin by marriage, Ryan Dallion. At first, Micki is a bit of a snob, a fashion plate, and fairly vulnerable. As the series progresses, Micki becomes stronger-willed, more independent, less materialistic, and darker in character.
Both her parents are still alive ("The Long Road Home"). Her mother, Catherine, is Irish and her father is English ("Shadow Boxer"). She has an irresponsible sister and a nephew, J.B., who is often left in Micki's care ("A Friend to the End"). She is engaged at the beginning of the show, but breaks it off in order to continue recovering cursed antiques ("Root of All Evil"). Her fiance, Lloyd, was not her first love ("Badge of Honor"), nor her last ("Master of Disguise"). Micki gets killed once when a cursed coin is used on her ("Tails I Live, Heads You Die"), but Ryan and Jack eventually trick the episode's antagonists into bringing her back to life.

- Ryan Dallion (played by John D. LeMay)

Ryan Dallion is Micki's cousin by marriage, and he also inherited the store. In the beginning he is portrayed as a failed art student and comics fan who obviously has ever-growing feelings for Micki as the series progresses in spite of her firm, consistent rejection. He is excited about fixing up the store, but Micki talks him into selling off the inventory, a decision they come to regret. Over time and experience, while maintaining his enthusiastic, cheerful and upbeat attitude, Ryan matures a great deal, evolving into a strong-willed, resourceful and independent young man who also has his own dark and sinister moments, not unlike Micki. Their relationship at first is cool but they grow to be very special to each other over time, especially after Micki's death in the beginning of the second season ("Tails I Live, Heads You Die").
Ryan's relationship with his father, Raymond, was not a good one ("Pipe Dream"). His younger brother Jimmy died when Ryan was 10, and his mother, Elizabeth, ran out on them shortly after ("Scarecrow", "The Prophecies"). She returned just before Ryan went to France with Micki to help a comatose Jack. At the beginning of the third season, he is removed from the show by being transformed into a small child ("The Prophecies").

- Johnny Ventura (played by Steve Monarque)

The naïve "kid" Jonathan "Johnny" Ventura is introduced toward the end of season two and replaces Ryan in the main trio in season three. He is first introduced as a vain, sleazy skirt-chaser with an eye for Micki ("Wedding Bell Blues"). The interest begins to wane, but briefly heats up again after he has matured through hard experience, when the two take a road trip to retrieve a cursed object and end up in a countryside house inhabited by a family of rural degenerates. ("The Long Road Home").
Johnny's mother died before his introduction into the show; his father, Vince, was a security guard who got shot and killed on the job ("The Prisoner"). Johnny has been arrested three times: once for having "boosted a six-pack of beer" and once for breaking and entering (both in "Wedding Bell Blues"), and finally as a suspect in his father's murder ("The Prisoner"). He has useful friends (from his father) in the police force. His unsophisticated, easily tempted character contrasts with Jack and Micki, and the third season includes several "Johnny screws up" episodes ("Crippled Inside", "Bad Penny", "Hate on Your Dial"), even though he eventually learns from his mistakes and proves to be a valuable ally and loyal friend to them.

=== Supporting ===
- Rashid (played by Elias Zarou)

Rashid is an Egyptian mystic who helps the trio when they are dealing directly with Lewis' ghost, who tries constantly to re-enter the world of the living ("Bottle of Dreams", "Doorway to Hell"). Though mentioned more than actually appearing in the series, Rashid is very much competent in helping his old friend Jack and the cousins one way or another.
Always knowledgeable in occult, sometimes even more so than Jack, Rashid is most capable as Jack's psychic-link during his first trial against Lewis. The second would be more guidance as to help Jack enter a cursed mirror and lead the cousins out of Lewis' possessed house.
Rashid was the one to help Jack bring back Ryan and Micki from Lewis' clutches twice, and even revealed to them the fate of Jack's son. During the series run, Rashid only appeared in two episodes though there are several others where he was mentioned ("Vanity's Mirror" and "Voodoo Mambo" are examples).

- Lewis Vendredi ("Uncle Lewis") (played by R. G. Armstrong)

Lewis Vendredi is an antiques dealer who sells his soul to the Devil (Satan) in exchange for immortality, wealth, and magic powers, including the power to heal wounds ("Pipe Dream"). His agreement with the Devil requires him to sell cursed antiques from his store "Vendredi's Antiques" (later renamed "Curious Goods"). In the series' first episode ("The Inheritance"), having grown tired of being a puppet for the Devil, he breaks the pact and is killed and taken to Hell. His niece Micki and nephew Ryan inherit his store and are soon joined by Jack. His name, "Vendredi", is French for "Friday".
Except for the first episode, Uncle Lewis is always a pure-evil character, the principal recurring villain of the series. He appears in occasional flashbacks (for example, in "What a Mother Wouldn't Do", "Night Hunger") and as a malevolent ghost ("Hellowe'en", "Bottle of Dreams", "Doorway to Hell"). He is alleged to have been the leader of a witches' coven while he was alive ("Coven of Darkness").

== Production ==
Friday the 13th: The Series was created by Frank Mancuso Jr. and Larry B. Williams originally under the title of The 13th Hour; the series ran for 72 episodes. Mancuso Jr. never intended to link the television show directly to the Friday the 13th film series, but utilize "the idea of Friday the 13th, which is that it symbolizes bad luck and curses". The creators wanted to tie-in Jason Voorhees' trademark hockey mask to the series, but the idea was discarded so that the show could have a chance to exist on its own. Mancuso Jr. was afraid that mentioning any events from the films would take the audience away from "the new world that we were trying to create". The decision to name the show Friday the 13th, over the original title, was made because Mancuso Jr. believed a "Friday the 13th" moniker would better help to sell the show to networks. Filming took place in Toronto, Canada. Friday the 13th: The Series aired in first-run syndication, initially in a late-night spot; the success of the series as a late-night show prompted some broadcasting stations to move it to prime time. Produced on a budget estimated below $500,000 per episode, the first season placed second in the male 18-to-49-year-old demographic, just behind Paramount's Star Trek: The Next Generation. In addition, the first season placed fifth in the female 18-to-49-year-old demographic. The composer Fred Mollin wrote the music for the series. Friday the 13th The Series – Music from the Original Television Scores was released in 1989 by GNP Crescendo Records.

== Cancellation ==
The first two seasons had 26 episodes apiece. The third was cut short due to the abrupt decision to cancel the show, when only 20 episodes had been broadcast. Ratings began to decline as the final season continued (due to John D. LeMay's character Ryan being written out from the show), and the introduction of new character Johnny Ventura was not popular (perhaps because he was seen mostly as "Ryan's replacement" instead of a character of his own).

The cast and crew were informed about the cancellation while filming the 20th episode of the third season, which ended up being the series finale. The decision was so sudden that they were unable to film more episodes or scenes to provide a kind of closure.

== International broadcasts ==
The series was broadcast on Tele 5 in Spain in 1991 under the title of Misterio para tres. In Greece, the series was broadcast on ANT1 and Makedonia TV under the title To mystirio tis Paraskevis (The mystery of Friday) and in Germany under the title Erben des Fluchs (Heirs to the Curse). It was also broadcast in Indonesia on TVRI from 1990 to 1991 every Thursday night and on RCTI from 1992 to 1996 every Friday night. In Finland, the series was known as Aaveita ja kummituksia (Ghosts and Ghoulies) and broadcast by MTV3.

== Home media ==
All three seasons have been issued on DVD in the US (CBS/Paramount, region 1, later repackaged and reissued as "The Complete Series"), Germany (CBS/Paramount, region 2) and Australia (Umbrella Entertainment, region 4). The first season has also been issued as a Spanish bootleg DVD set (Resen, regions 1–6).

In the UK, the episodes The Inheritance and Cupid's Quiver were released together on a single home video, titled Friday the 13th: The Legacy, in 1988. The video was classified 18 by the BBFC.

== Awards and nominations ==
Friday the 13th: The Series was nominated for two Emmy Awards in 1988 and 1989 for Visual and Graphic Effects. The series won two silver plaques in Chicago for the episodes Scarlet Cinema and The Sweetest Sting. In 1990 the series was nominated by the Academy of Science Fiction, Fantasy & Horror Films as Best Series. The series was nominated twelve times for writing, editing, directing, production design, acting, sound and music by the Gemini Awards in Canada.

== Influence ==
A popular rumor says the last episode was to unite the movie and television franchises by having the final item recovered be Jason' hockey mask. This remains unfounded and while there was talk about having a hockey mask on one of the sets as an in-joke, there was never any serious intention to mix the film series into the television series.

The series' plot about a group of individuals rooting out evil supernatural occurrences created a mold into which many later series fit. Buffy the Vampire Slayer, Angel and The X-Files all have many episodes that revolve around a team recovering cursed artifacts. The 2009 Syfy original series Warehouse 13 has been accused of "borrowing" much from Friday the 13th: The Series. The show stars two agents, Myka Bering (Joanne Kelly) and Peter Lattimer (Eddie McClintock), led by the older and wiser Arthur "Artie" Nielsen (Saul Rubinek) as they collect artifacts, powerful items "imbued with human energy" and supernatural powers. These artifacts are stored in the warehouse, safely hidden from both the public and those who would exploit them for evil or selfish purposes. However, the artifacts featured in the Warehouse 13 series are neither evil by nature nor cursed, require no human sacrifice to function and can be destroyed.

== Documentary book ==
Curious Goods: Behind the Scenes of Friday the 13th: The Series by Alyse Wax, a retrospective focusing on the television series, was released in October 2015 by BearManor Media.

== See also ==
- Crystal Lake, a television series based on the Jason Voorhees film franchise
- Halloween III: Season of the Witch
