= Timothy Bond =

Canadian director and screenwriter

- Born: 1942 (age 83–84); Ottawa, Ontario, Canada

Timothy Bond (born 1942) is a Canadian director and screenwriter. He normally does television, but has done films as well. He has done episodes of Due South, The New Alfred Hitchcock Presents, Star Trek: The Next Generation, Sliders and others.

== Partial filmography ==
- 1985
  - Oakmount High
- 1992
  - The Lost World
  - Return to the Lost World
- 1994
  - Christy (TV Series)
- 1995
  - The Outer Limits
  - Goosebumps
- 1996
  - Night of the Twisters (TV movie)
  - Goosebumps
- 1997
  - The New Ghostwriter Mysteries
  - The Shadow Men
  - Goosebumps
- 1998
  - Perfect Little Angels (TV movie)
- 2001
  - High Explosive
  - She
- 2011
  - The Case for Christmas (TV movie)
- 2012
  - Christmas Song (TV movie)
