= The Man Who Wouldn't Die (1995 film) =

- Roger Moore and Nancy Allen
- Genre: Crime; Drama; Fantasy
- Written by: Don Shroll; David Amann
- Directed by: Bill Condon
- Starring: Roger Moore; Nancy Allen; Malcolm McDowell; Eric McCormack
- Music by: David Shire
- Country of origin: United States
- Original language: English

Production
- Executive producers: Roger Moore; Alan Barnette; Mark Gordon
- Producer: Alex Beaton
- Production locations: Vancouver; Victoria, British Columbia
- Cinematography: Stephen M. Katz
- Editor: Virginia Katz
- Running time: 98 minutes
- Production companies: Alan Barnette Productions; Universal Television

Original release
- Network: ABC
- Release: May 29, 1995

The Man Who Wouldn't Die is a 1995 action mystery film by director Bill Condon. The film, which aired as a movie of the week during the May Sweeps in 1995, stars Roger Moore, Nancy Allen and Malcolm McDowell. The Man Who Wouldn't Die premiered on ABC on May 29, 1995. Internationally, it received either a theatrical or direct-to-video release.

== Synopsis ==
In The Man Who Wouldn't Die art imitates life for Thomas Grace (Roger Moore), a famous British ex-novelist who wrote a series of acclaimed crime stories featuring a villain patterned after real-life criminal Bernard Drake (Malcolm McDowell). Now living in America, Grace works as a hack reporter for a city newspaper. After reading one of Grace's books, Jessie Gallardo (Nancy Allen), a waitress with burgeoning psychic abilities, predicts several murders—with Grace as one of the victims. Her visions identify the enemy as Drake, who has escaped from prison by faking his own death in a fire. As Drake sets out to frame the author for a series of grisly murders based around his novels, it is up to Thomas and Jessie to clear their names, stop him, and stay alive in the process. Eric McCormack co-stars as a doubtful newspaper colleague.

== Cast ==
- Roger Moore as Thomas Grace / Inspector Fulbright
- Nancy Allen as Jessie Gallardo
- Malcolm McDowell as Bernard Drake / Ian Morrissey
- Jackson Davies as Sgt. Powers
- Eric McCormack as Jack Sullivan
- Roman Podhora as Walter Tilley
- Gillian Barber as Art Sycophant
- Roger R. Cross as McKinnon
- Kevin McNulty as Curruthers

== Reception ==
BBC's Radio Times gave the movie 3 stars, saying it had a "dark sense of fun" that was "surely worth an hour and a half of anyone's time."

The Youngstown Vindicator said the film was "thoroughly enjoyable" and "as polished and as surprising as any good mystery drama can provide".
