= Louise Robey =

Canadian actress and singer

- Born: Louise Anne Beris Fiona Robey; Montreal, Quebec, Canada
- Other names: Louise Ann Robey; Robey; Lady Burford; Louise Burford; Louise, Countess of Burford; Louise Beauclerk
- Education: St Leonards School
- Occupations: Singer; songwriter; actress; model
- Years active: 1979–present
- Spouse: Lord Burford (m. 1994; div. 2001)
- Children: 1

Louise Anne Beris (Note: aka "Beatrice") Fiona Robey is a French Canadian actress, songwriter, singer, children's book writer/illustrator, and property developer. During much of her career, she used only her last name Robey as a stage name. She is best known for her role as Micki Foster in the television series Friday the 13th: The Series (1987–1990).

== Early life and education ==
Robey was born in Montreal, Quebec. Her father, Colonel Malcolm Vernon Robey, was a pilot in the Royal Canadian Air Force then NATO diplomat and her mother was a former London stage actress.

Robey was raised and educated in France, Italy, Norway, Scotland, Canada and West Germany, learning to speak four languages. She attended St Leonards School in St Andrews, Fife, Scotland. She is a graduate of Elmwood School in Ottawa.

== Career ==
=== Singing and modelling ===
After high school, Robey travelled to Aix-en-Provence. French photographer Jacques Henri Lartigue spotted her sunbathing at a hotel pool, took her photograph, and invited her to become a model. Lartigue photographed Robey for Paris Match and Vogue Paris. Robey moved to Paris, where she swiftly attained success as a fashion model. She also began a music career, busking in the streets and fronting the ska-punk band Louise and the Creeps signed to CBS France and UK by president Alain Levy. In the early 1980s, Robey moved to New York City, where she worked as a catwalk model earning $5,000 a day and appeared in advertising campaigns for Maybelline, Jordache, Revlon, L'Oreal and Clairol amongst many others. She has appeared in many magazines from Vogue to Cosmopolitan internationally.

Although Louise and the Creeps were signed to a record deal with CBS France/UK by CBS head Alain Levy, under the wing of Andy Warhol and Michael Butler [producer of the musical Hair], and offered a signing by Chris Blackwell of Island Records, they broke up in New York before recording an album. In 1984, Robey landed a solo record deal with CBS/Sony and recorded a self-titled album. Six singles from the album were released. One single, a cover of the song "One Night in Bangkok" from the musical Chess, became an international hit. Robey's version of the song spent three weeks on the Billboard Hot 100 in March 1985, peaking at No. 77. It fared much better on the Billboard Hot Dance Club Play chart, peaking at No.3. She signed to Chrysalis records in 1986 and had a hit dance record "I Surrender/Hungry For You Boy".

=== Acting ===
While working as a musician, Robey continued to model and also became involved in improvisational comedy, performing with the famed troupe M.I.C.E.[Mike's improv comedy experiment] in theatres and clubs throughout California. She also appeared in stage roles in dinner theater. In 1986, Robey had small roles in the films The Money Pit and Raw Deal. The following year, she beat out 300-plus other actresses for the role of Michelle "Micki" Foster, niece of antiques dealer Lewis Vendredi, on the syndicated science-fiction series Friday the 13th: The Series, which Frank Mancuso Jr. produced. Foster is a young woman who inherits an antique shop from Lewis Vendredi (R. G. Armstrong), her estranged uncle. When the antiques in the shop prove to have been cursed by the devil, Foster, Ryan Dallion (John D. LeMay), her cousin by marriage, and family friend Jack Marshak (Chris Wiggins) begin to hunt down and recover the antiques before they can kill or cause the damnations of the souls of anyone else. The show, which was filmed in Toronto, was received positively by audiences and became one of the top-three syndicated dramas airing at the time, second only to Star Trek. She was nominated for best actress by the Saturn Awards.

== Personal life ==
In 1993, Robey began dating Charles Beauclerk, Earl of Burford, direct descendant of King Charles II and his mistress, actress Nell Gwynn. The two met after Beauclerk gave a lecture about one of his relatives, the 17th Earl of Oxford, who is one of several authors named in the Shakespeare authorship question. The couple married on 29 December 1994 at St Winifreds Church in Manaton, Dartmoor. At the time of the marriage, Robey was pregnant with the couple's child. The couple lived in Ipswich and Hadleigh, Suffolk, before divorcing in 2001.

== Filmography ==
Year	Title	Role	Notes
1986	The Money Pit	Female Vocalist	Credited as Robey
1986	Raw Deal	Lamanski's Girl	Credited as Robey
1987–1990	Friday the 13th: The Series	Micki Foster	70 episodes Credited as Robey
1992 2026	Play Nice Lobo hombre en París (Florihan) vídeo Clip	Jill Crane / Rapunzel Micki Foster 1987 tribute	Credited as Robey (final film role) Credited as Robey (1987 IA versión homenaje )

== Discography ==
=== Albums ===
- Robey (1985, CBS/Sony)
- Music Anthology... Part 1: 1979-2009 (2011, Amazon/TuneCore Records)

=== Singles ===
Year	Title	US	Dance
1984	"One Night in Bangkok"	77	3
1985	"Moth to a Flame"	–	–
1985	"Killer Instinct"	–	34
1986	"I Surrender"	–	47
1987	"Tighter, Tighter"	–	–
1988	"Flight of the Phoenix" (with Cerrone)	–	–
2009	"Pure Love/Baby Insane" (with Lima Djari)	–	–
2011	"Like a Woman Scorned"	–	–
2013	"Take it to the Top" (with Lovari)	–	–

=== Soundtracks ===
- "Web of Desire" (with White Lion) (1986, The Money Pit soundtrack)
