= John D. LeMay =

American actor and filmmaker (born 1962)

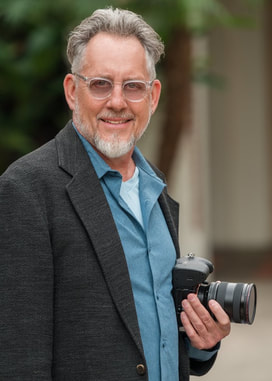
- John D. LeMay headshot from his business website.
- Born: May 29, 1962 (age 64); Saint Paul, Minnesota, U.S.
- Occupation: Actor
- Years active: 1985–present
- Children: 1

John David LeMay (born May 29, 1962) is an American actor and documentary filmmaker. He has starred in numerous TV shows, films, and theatre productions.

== Biography ==
John D. LeMay was born in St. Paul, Minnesota on 29 May 1962. In 1970, the LeMay family relocated to Normal, Illinois. LeMay grew up wanting to be a professional football quarterback and played with the Normal Might Mites in the eighth grade. LeMay considered himself to be a class clown that enjoyed being in front of people and making them laugh.

== Early life and education ==
As a public school student in the second grade, LeMay got his first taste in theatrical productions by playing the part of Sneezy in his class production of Snow White and the Seven Dwarfs. Playing a "ham" at cub scouts, he discovered that not only could he sing but he was also able to make people laugh. After winning first place in a high school talent contest for his singing, LeMay joined the Normal Parks and Recreation Department's High School theater program to participate in musical comedy. He decided to further his education in Vocal Performance and enrolled at Illinois State University's Theatre Department, during which time he interned with the Theatre Building Chicago and also landed a role in the Bailiwick Repertory Theatre production of Room Service and the Blind Parrot production of American Gothic. After graduating with a Bachelor of Science degree in Music, combined with a contract major in Musical Theatre in 1984 (the contract allowed him to receive credit in other performance classes such as theatre & dance), LeMay earned his Screen Actors Guild card the following year, and then moved out west to Los Angeles, California. He also added a middle initial "D" to his name so as not to be confused with another actor by the same name.

== Career ==
For the next two years, LeMay worked with an agent who kept him busy doing commercials and guest spots on television series. His first gig was on Remington Steele in 1985, followed by appearances in The Facts of Life and the 1985 revival of The Twilight Zone. He also appeared as a medical intern in the 1987 comedy film The Couch Trip just prior to winning the lead role as Ryan Dallion on the horror gothic anthology series Friday the 13th: The Series.

A few weeks before his audition, LeMay had accompanied a friend on a Thursday evening to a "spiritualist centre" in Hollywood. Visitors were asked to submit a handwritten question on a piece of paper and place it into a bowl. A middle-aged seer pulled LeMay's question and he was told that he would be expecting a job offer from "back East". LeMay interpreted this as meaning New York City. Shortly afterwards, he received a call to audition for a series in Toronto. Says LeMay, "I convinced myself that the job was mine -- that the great beyond was taking care of me. That being said, I prepared myself for every audition ... I remember us (he and his co-star, Robey) going over the sides near a dumpster in the Paramount lot. It all seemed glamorous at the time."

Following his departure from the series, LeMay racked up more television credits with guest spots on the historical war drama series Tour Of Duty, Gabriel's Fire, Eddie Dodd, and Over My Dead Body. In 1993, LeMay starred in part nine of the Friday the 13th film series Jason Goes to Hell: The Final Friday. Playing the heroic role of Steven Freeman who battled the hockey-masked maniacal killer Jason Voorhees to save his infant daughter. LeMay worked under the guidance of director Adam Marcus for New Line Cinema.

In 2014 LeMay moved to Boise, Idaho and started his own video production company called FEAT1STFILMS. The company produces branded video content for websites and social media, helping business and individuals share their stories visually with a broader audience.

== Selected filmography ==
Year(s)	Title	Role	Notes
1986	The Twilight Zone	Ted	"Aqua Vita"
1986	The Twilight Zone	Gay Man	"Dead Run"
1987	Highway to Heaven	Pete Lowell	TV series; guest role
1988	The Couch Trip	Dr. Smet's Resident	Feature film
1989	The Freeway Maniac	Lover in Truck	
1987–1989	Friday the 13th: The Series	Ryan Dallion	TV series; main role
1990	Over My Dead Body	Murray	TV series; guest role
1990	Tour of Duty	SP4 Michael Kelman	TV series; guest role
1991	Eddie Dodd		TV series; guest role
1993	Jason Goes to Hell: The Final Friday	Steven Freeman	Feature film
1996	Without a Map	Paul	
2001	Three Shots	Robert	
2001	Totally Blonde	Guy in Bar	Feature film; minor role
2009	His Name Was Jason: 30 Years of Friday the 13th	Himself	Documentary film
2013	Crystal Lake Memories: The Complete History of Friday the 13th	Himself	Documentary film
2025	Hearts of Darkness: The Making of the Final Friday	Himself	Documentary film
