= Arthur Conan Doyle bibliography =

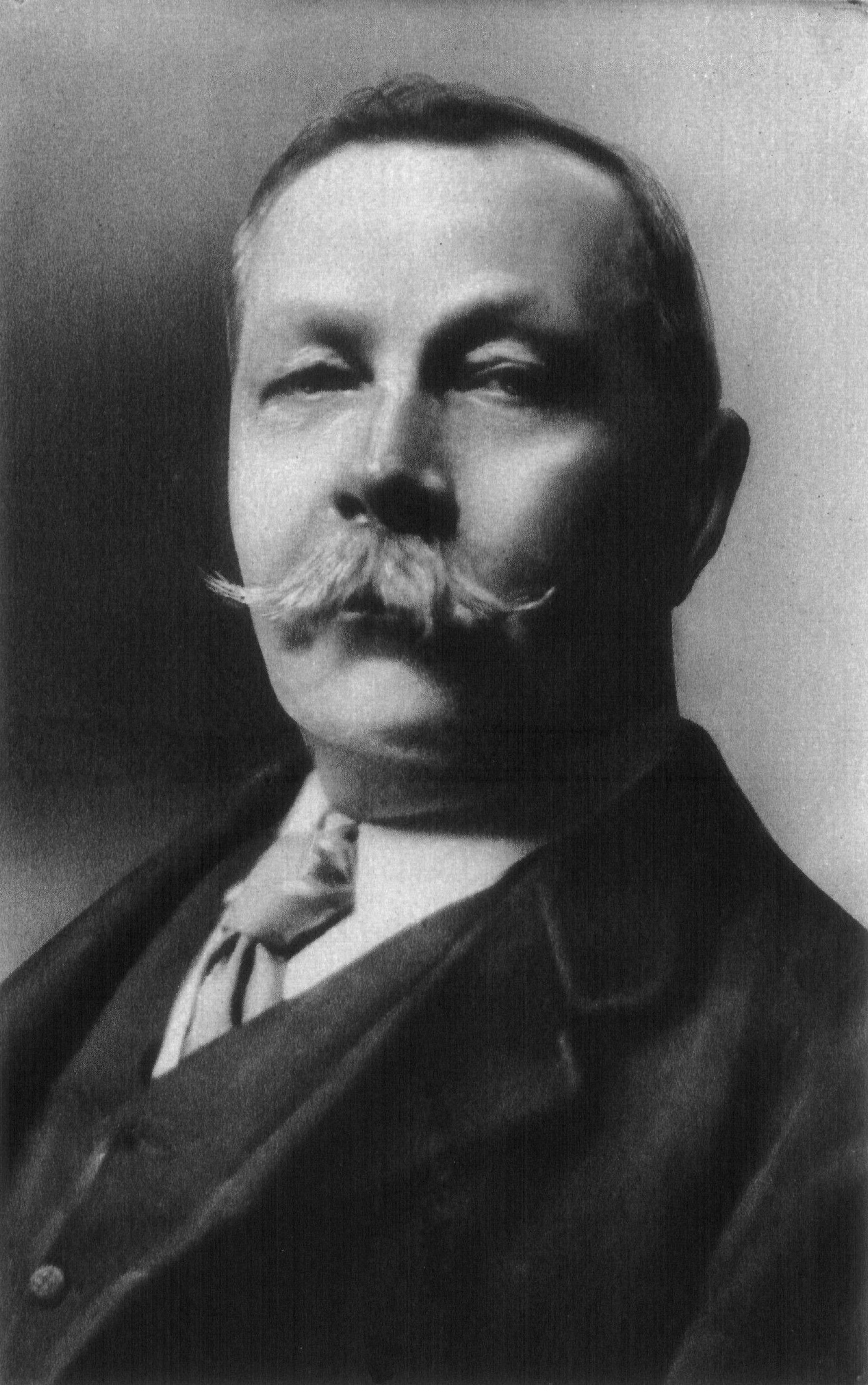
- Arthur Conan Doyle, 1914
- Books↙: 10
- Novels↙: 22
- Stories↙: 204
- Collections↙: 16
- Poems↙: 4
- Plays↙: 14
- Spiritualist and paranormal books↙: 13
- Spiritualist and paranormal pamphlets↙: 10
- Operettas↙: 1

Sir Arthur Conan Doyle (1859–1930) was a Scottish writer and physician. In addition to the series of stories chronicling the activities of Sherlock Holmes and his friend Dr John Watson for which he is well known, Doyle wrote on a wide range of topics, both fictional and non-fictional. In 1876 Doyle entered the University of Edinburgh Medical School, where he became a pupil of Joseph Bell, whose deductive processes impressed his pupil so much that the teacher became the chief model for Holmes. Doyle began writing while still a student, and in October 1879 he had his first work—"The Mystery of the Sasassa Valley"—published in Chambers's Journal. He continued writing short works—both fictional and non-fictional—throughout his career, and had over 200 stories and articles published.

In July 1891 Doyle published the short story "A Scandal in Bohemia" in The Strand Magazine—a "story which would change his life", according to his biographer, Andrew Lycett, as it introduced Holmes and Watson to a wide audience; the duo had provided the subject of Doyle's first novel, A Study in Scarlet, which was published in Beeton's Christmas Annual in 1887. The story in The Strand was one in a series of six, published in successive months. They were well received by the public, and the editors of the magazine commissioned a further six stories, and then another series of twelve. Doyle, fearful of having his other work overshadowed by his fictional detective, killed his creation off in December 1893 in "The Adventure of the Final Problem". He also wrote four full-length Holmes works, as well as adventure novels and nine historical works of fiction. In 1912 he began the adventure series featuring Professor Challenger, who first appeared in The Lost World—both in short stories and novels.

Doyle also wrote four volumes of poetry and a series of stage works—his first was Jane Annie, an unsuccessful attempt at a libretto to an operetta, which he wrote with J. M. Barrie. Doyle was an enthusiastic supporter of the Boer War, and wrote two histories of the events. During the First World War he also wrote extensively on that conflict, both short articles and a six-volume history. Following the close successive deaths of his son and his brother, Doyle turned to spiritualism and wrote extensively on the subject; his biographer Owen Dudley Edwards writes that at the time of Doyle's death in July 1930, while the writer "most wanted to be remembered as a champion of spiritualism and as a historical novelist, it is Sherlock Holmes who has continued to capture the imagination of the public".

== Publications in periodicals ==
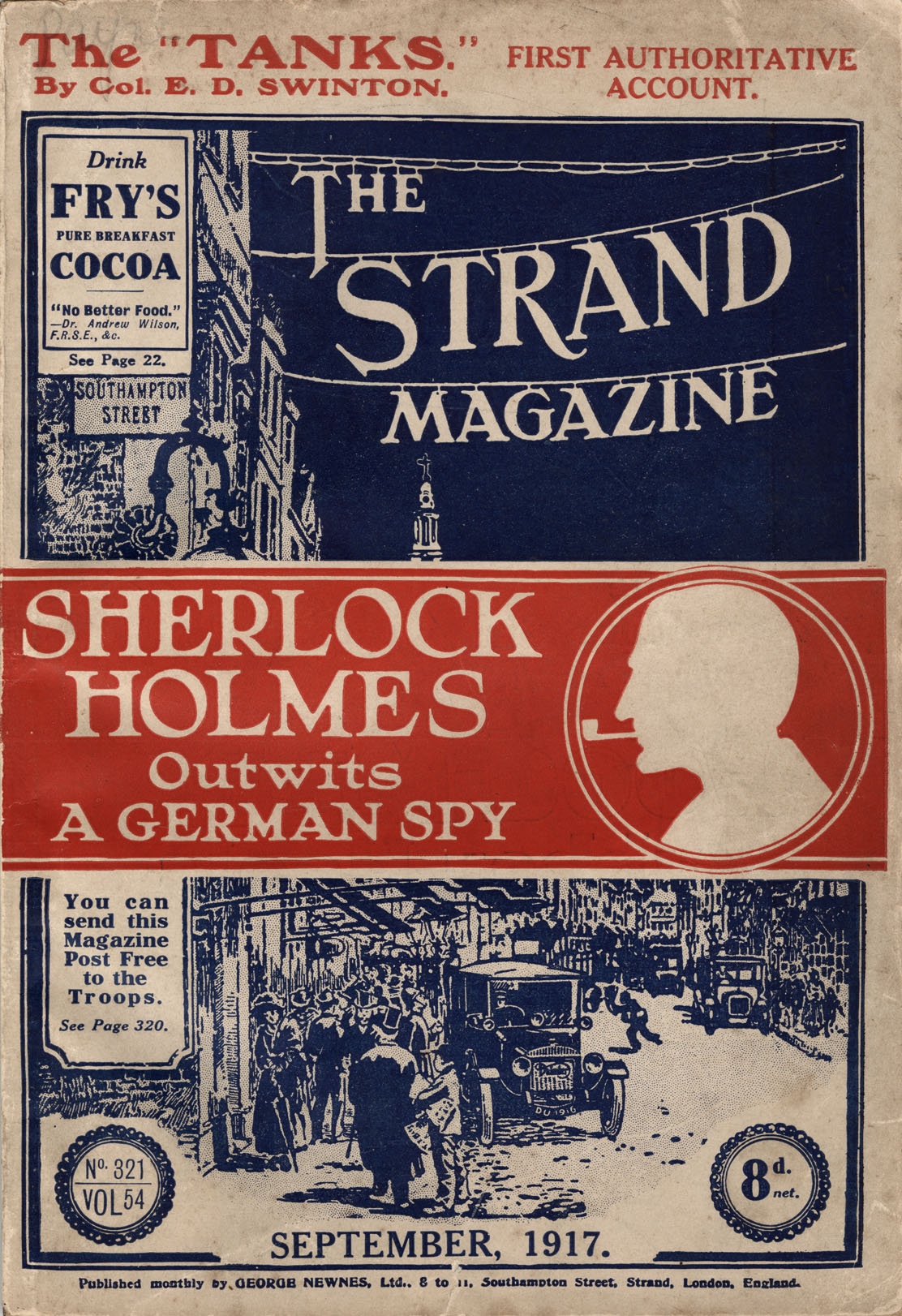
1917 cover of The Strand Magazine, containing a morale-boosting story from Doyle

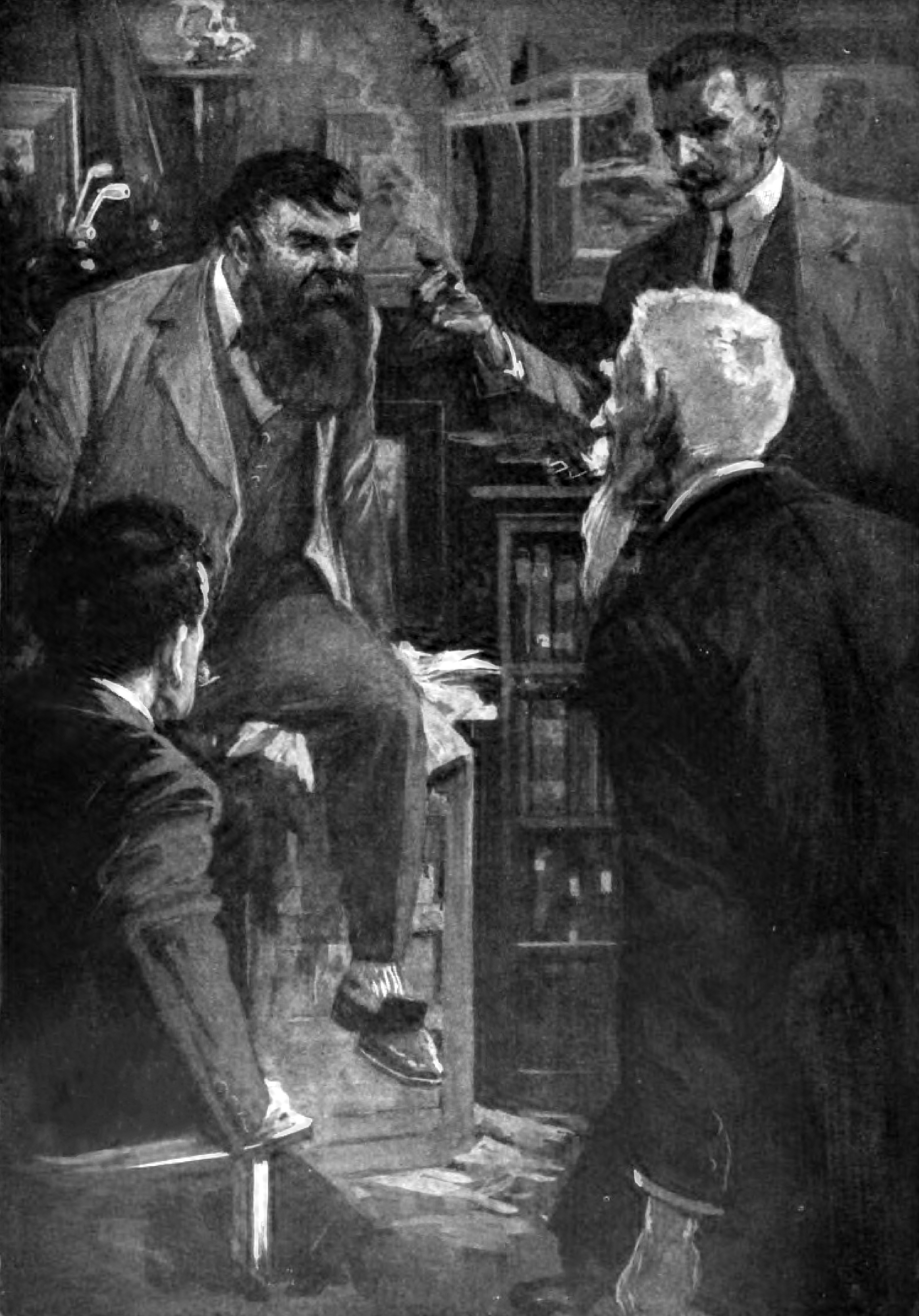
Professor Challenger (seated) as illustrated by Harry Rountree in Doyle's novella The Poison Belt in The Strand Magazine

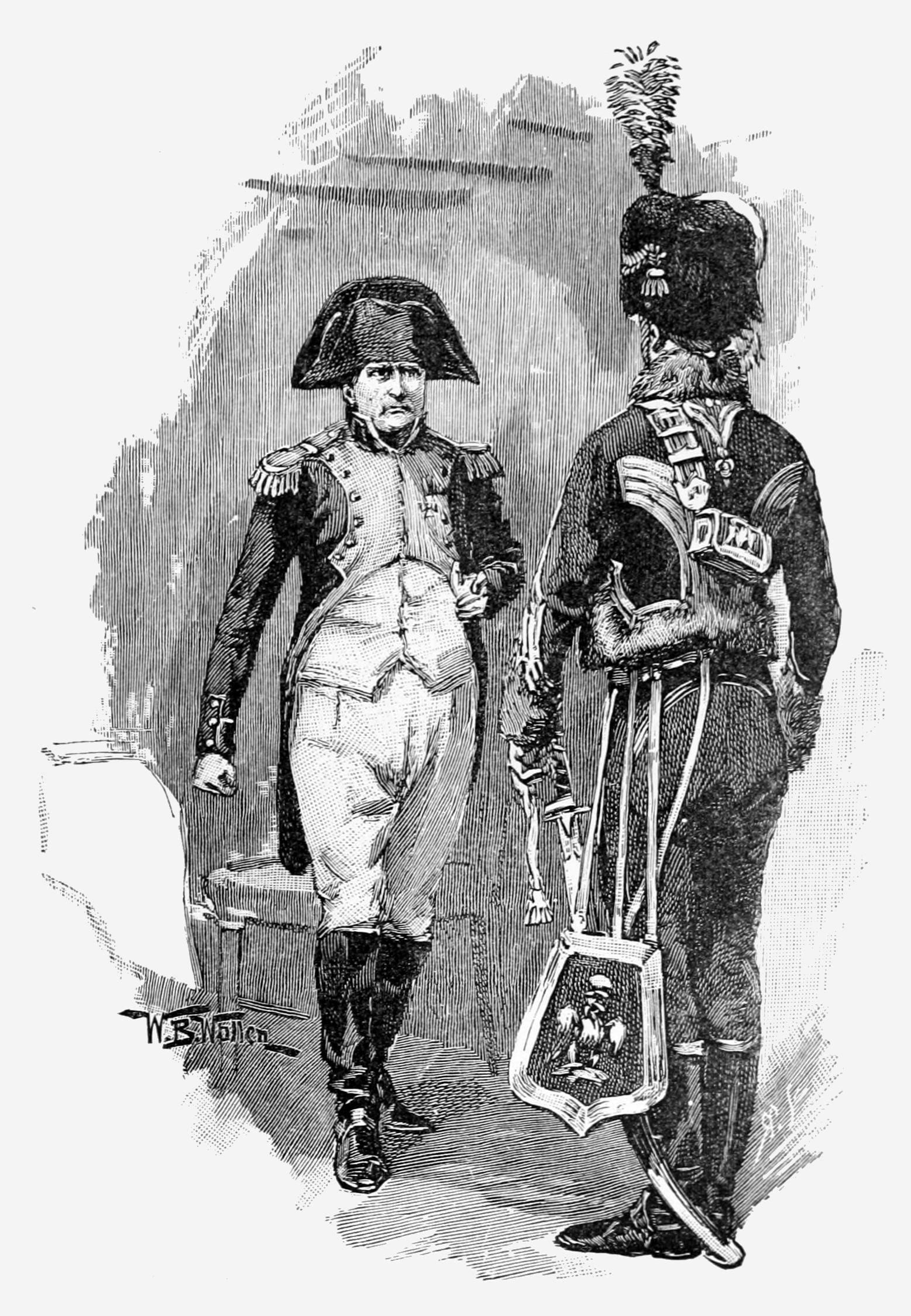
Brigadier Gerard receiving his medal from Napoleon Bonaparte in "The Medal of Brigadier Gerard"; from The Strand Magazine, December 1894.

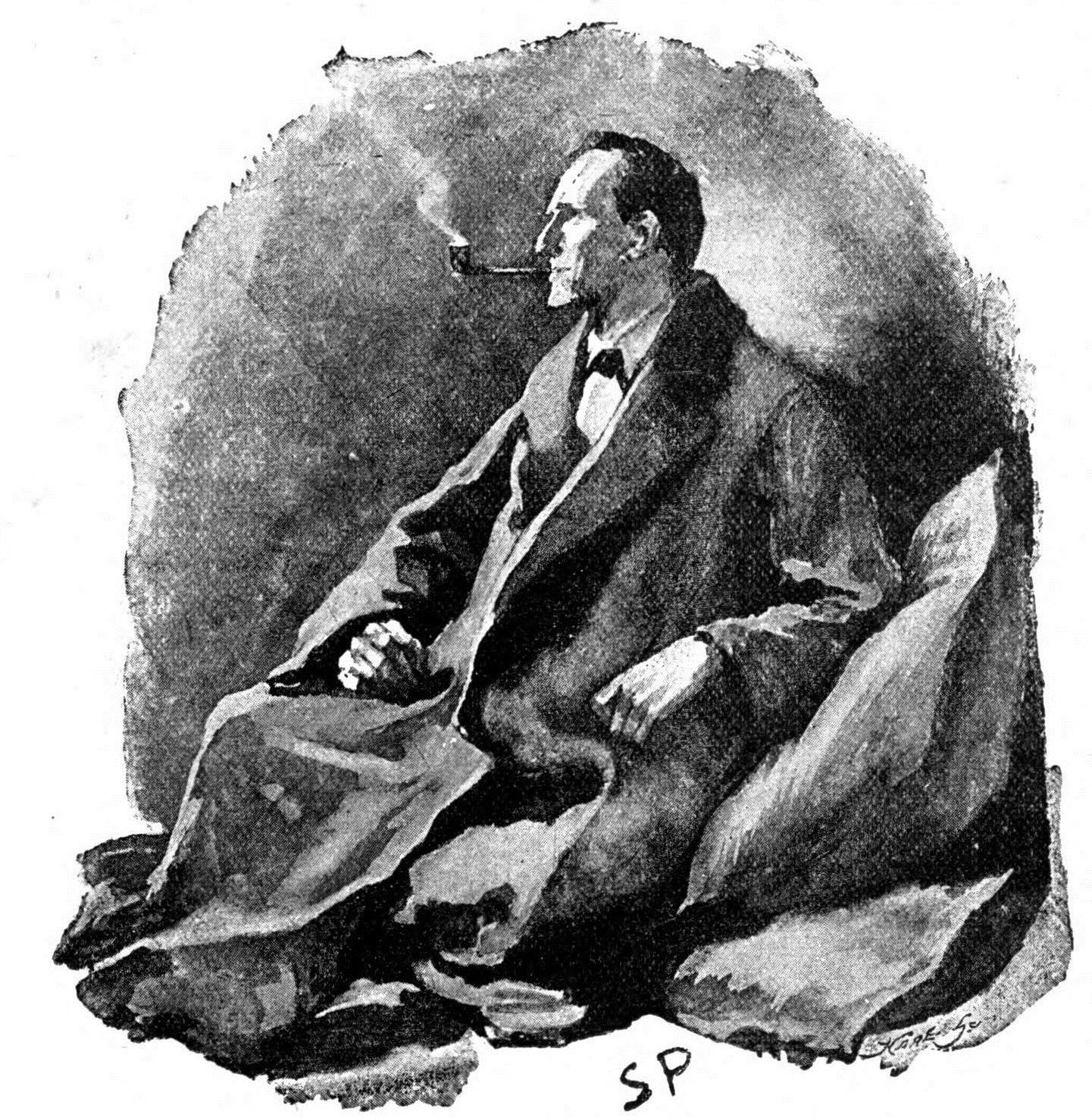
Sherlock Holmes thinks through a problem in "The Man with the Twisted Lip", which appeared in The Strand Magazine in December 1891

Title	Date of publication	Periodical	Notes
"The Mystery of Sasassa Valley"	October 1879	Chambers's Journal	published anonymously
"Gelseminum as a Poison"	20 September 1879	British Medical Journal	
"The American's Tale"	December 1880	London Society	Christmas issue
"A Night Among the Nihilists"	April 1881	London Society	
"The Gully of Bluemansdyke"	December 1881	London Society	published as by "A.C.D."
"That Little Square Box"	December 1881	London Society	published anonymously
"Bones"	April 1882	London Society	
"Our Derby Sweepstakes"	May 1882	London Society	
"That Veteran"	2 September 1882	All the Year Round	published anonymously
"My Friend the Murderer"	December 1882	London Society	
"The Captain of the Pole-Star"	January 1883	Temple Bar	
"Gentlemanly Joe"	31 March 1883	All the Year Round	published anonymously
"The Winning Shot"	11 July 1883	Bow Bells	
"The Silver Hatchet"	December 1883	London Society	
"Selecting a Ghost"	December 1883	London Society	
"An Exciting Christmas Eve"	December 1883	The Boy's Own Paper	Christmas issue
"Life and Death in the Blood"	1884	Good Words	semi-scientific article
"J. Habakuk Jephson's Statement"	January 1884	The Cornhill Magazine	
"The Heiress of Glenmahowley"	January 1884	Temple Bar	
"The Blood-Stone Tragedy"	16 February 1884	Cassell's Saturday Journal	
"John Barrington Cowles"	12 April 1884	Cassell's Saturday Journal	serialised in two instalments
"The Cabman's Story"	17 May 1884	Cassell's Saturday Journal	
"The Tragedians"	20 August 1884	Bow Bells	
"Crabbe's Practice"	December 1884	The Boy's Own Paper	Christmas issue
"The Man from Archangel"	January 1885	London Society	
"The Lonely Hampshire Cottage"	2 May 1885	Cassell's Saturday Journal	
"The Great Keinplatz Experiment"	July 1885	Belgravia	
"The Fate of the Evangeline"	December 1885	The Boy's Own Paper	Christmas issue
"The Parson of Jackman's Gulch"	December 1885	London Society	
"A Midshipman's Story"	December 1885	Cassell's Magazine	
"Cyprian Overbeck Wells, or A Literary Mosaic"	December 1886	The Boy's Own Paper	Christmas issue
"Uncle Jeremy's Household"	1887	The Boy's Own Paper	serialised over seven issues
"The Stone of Boxman's Drift"	1887	The Boy's Own Paper	
A Study in Scarlet	1887	Beeton's Christmas Annual	Sherlock Holmes novel
"John Huxford's Hiatus"	June 1888	The Cornhill Magazine	
The Mystery of Cloomber	30 August 1888	The Pall Mall Budget	novel serialised in The Pall Mall Budget and The Pall Mall Gazette
"The Geographical Distribution of British Intellect"	August 1888	The Nineteenth Century	
"The Bravoes of Market Drayton"	August 1889	Chambers's Journal	
The Firm of Girdlestone	27 October 1889	The People	novel serialised from October 1889 to April 1890
"The Ring of Thoth"	January 1890	The Cornhill Magazine	
The Sign of the Four	February 1890	Lippincott's Magazine	Sherlock Holmes novel
"A Physiologist's Wife"	September 1890	Blackwood's Magazine	
"The Surgeon of Gaster Fell"	December 1890	Chambers's Journal	
"The Duello in France"	December 1890	The Cornhill Magazine	
"A Pastoral Horror"	21 December 1890	The People	published anonymously
The White Company	January – December 1891	The Cornhill Magazine	serialised throughout the year
"A Forgotten Tale"	January 1891	Scribner's Magazine	verse
"Our Midnight Visitor"	February 1891	Temple Bar	
"The Voice of Science"	March 1891	The Strand Magazine	credited in the table of contents but not on the story itself
"A Straggler of '15"	21 March 1891	Black and White	
"A Scandal in Bohemia"	July 1891	The Strand Magazine	Sherlock Holmes story
"The Colonel's Choice"	26 July 1891	Lloyd's Weekly Newspaper	
"The Red-Headed League"	August 1891	The Strand Magazine	Sherlock Holmes story
"A Case of Identity"	September 1891	The Strand Magazine	Sherlock Holmes story
"The Boscombe Valley Mystery"	October 1891	The Strand Magazine	Sherlock Holmes story
"The Five Orange Pips"	November 1891	The Strand Magazine	Sherlock Holmes story
"A Sordid Affair"	21 November 1891	The People	
"The Man with the Twisted Lip"	December 1891	The Strand Magazine	Sherlock Holmes story
"The Fate of Fenella"	19 December 1891	The Gentlewoman	
"A False Start"	1891	The Gentlewoman	Christmas issue
Beyond the City	1891	Good Words	Christmas issue
"The Adventure of the Blue Carbuncle"	January 1892	The Strand Magazine	Sherlock Holmes story
"Out of the Running	2 January 1892	Black and White	
"The Adventure of the Speckled Band"	February 1892	The Strand Magazine	Sherlock Holmes story
"The Adventure of the Engineer's Thumb"	March 1892	The Strand Magazine	Sherlock Holmes story
"De Profundis"	March 1892	The Idler	
"The Adventure of the Noble Bachelor"	April 1892	The Strand Magazine	Sherlock Holmes story
"The Adventure of the Beryl Coronet"	May 1892	The Strand Magazine	Sherlock Holmes story
"The Adventure of the Copper Beeches"	June 1892	The Strand Magazine	Sherlock Holmes story
"A Day with Dr Conan Doyle"	August 1892	The Strand Magazine	
"Lot No. 249"	September 1892	Harper's Magazine	
"Jelland's Voyage"	12 November 1892	Harper's Weekly	
"The Adventure of Silver Blaze"	December 1892	The Strand Magazine	Sherlock Holmes story
The Refugees	January – June 1893	Harper's Magazine	serial
"The Adventure of the Cardboard Box"	January 1893	The Strand Magazine	Sherlock Holmes story
"The Adventure of the Yellow Face"	February 1893	The Strand Magazine	Sherlock Holmes story
"The Adventure of the Stockbroker's Clerk"	March 1893	The Strand Magazine	Sherlock Holmes story
"The Adventure of the Gloria Scott"	April 1893	The Strand Magazine	Sherlock Holmes story
"The Adventure of the Musgrave Ritual"	May 1893	The Strand Magazine	Sherlock Holmes story
"The Adventure of the Reigate Squire"	June 1893	The Strand Magazine	Sherlock Holmes story
"The Green Flag"	June 1893	The Pall Mall Magazine	
"The Adventure of the Crooked Man"	July 1893	The Strand Magazine	Sherlock Holmes story
"The Adventure of the Resident Patient"	August 1893	The Strand Magazine	Sherlock Holmes story
"Pennarby Mine"	August 1893	The Pall Mall Magazine	verse
"The Adventure of the Greek Interpreter"	September 1893	The Strand Magazine	Sherlock Holmes story
"Sherlock Holmes Examination Paper"	21 October 1893	Tit-Bits	quiz about the Sherlock Holmes stories; published anonymously but shown in 2024 to have been written by Doyle
"The Adventure of the Naval Treaty"	October – November 1893	The Strand Magazine	Sherlock Holmes story
"The Case of Lady Sannox"	November 1893	The Idler	
"The Adventure of the Final Problem"	December 1893	The Strand Magazine	Sherlock Holmes story
The Stark Munro Letters	October 1894–November 1895	The Idler	novel in epistolary form
"Sweethearts"	June 1894	The Idler	
"The Lord of Chateau Noir"	July 1894	The Strand Magazine	
"The Medal of Brigadier Gerard"	December 1894	The Strand Magazine	Brigadier Gerard story
"An Alpine Pass on Ski"	December 1894	The Strand Magazine	
"The Recollections of Captain Wilkie"	19 January 1895	Chambers's Journal	serialised in two parts
"How the Brigadier Held the King"	April 1895	The Strand Magazine	Brigadier Gerard story
"How the King Held the Brigadier"	May 1895	The Strand Magazine	Brigadier Gerard story
"How the Brigadier Slew the Brothers of Ajaccio"	June 1895	The Strand Magazine	Brigadier Gerard story
"How the Brigadier Came to the Castle of Gloom"	July 1895	The Strand Magazine	Brigadier Gerard story
"How the Brigadier Took the Field Against the Marshal Millefleurs"	August 1895	The Strand Magazine	Brigadier Gerard story
"How the Brigadier was Tempted by the Devil"	September 1895	The Strand Magazine	Brigadier Gerard story
"How the Brigadier Played for a Kingdom"	December 1895	The Strand Magazine	Brigadier Gerard story
Rodney Stone	January – December 1896	The Strand Magazine	serialised in 12 parts
"The Three Correspondents"	October 1896	The Windsor Magazine	
"The Debut of Bimbashi Joyce"	January 1897	Punch	
"The Governor of St. Kitts"	January 1897	Pearson's Magazine	"Tales of the High Seas"/Captain Sharkey story
"Life on a Greenland Whaler"	January 1897	The Strand Magazine	
Uncle Bernac	January – March 1897	The Queen	Brigadier Gerard novel; serialised weekly
"The Two Barques"	March 1897	Pearson's Magazine	"Tales of the High Seas"/Captain Sharkey story
The Tragedy of the Korosko	May – December 1897	The Strand Magazine	serialised over eight instalments
"The Voyage of Captain Banks"	May 1897	Pearson's Magazine	"Tales of the High Seas"/Captain Sharkey story
"The Striped Chest"	July 1897	Pearson's Magazine	"Tales of the High Seas" story
"Burger's Secret"	1898	The Sunlight Year-Book	later published as "The New Catacomb"
"Cremona"	January 1898	The Cornhill Magazine	
"The Confession"	17 January 1898	The Star	
"The Groom's Story"	April 1898	The Cornhill Magazine	
"The Story of the Beetle Hunter"	June 1898	The Strand Magazine	Round the Fire story
"The Story of the Man With the Watches"	July 1898	The Strand Magazine	Round the Fire story
"The King of the Foxes"	July 1898	The Windsor Magazine	
"The Story of the Lost Special"	August 1898	The Strand Magazine	Round the Fire story
"The Story of the Sealed Room"	September 1898	The Strand Magazine	Round the Fire story
"The Story of the Black Doctor"	October 1898	The Strand Magazine	Round the Fire story
"The Fiend of the Cooperage"	1 October 1898	The Manchester Weekly Times	also published in Ainslee's Magazine, October 1898
"The Story of the Club-Footed Grocer"	November 1898	The Strand Magazine	Round the Fire story
"The Retirement of Signor Lambert"	December 1898	Pearson's Magazine	
"A Shadow Before"	December 1898	The Windsor Magazine	
"The Story of the Brazilian Cat"	December 1898	The Strand Magazine	Round the Fire story
"The Story of the Japanned Box"	January 1899	The Strand Magazine	Round the Fire story
"The Story of the Jew's Breast-Plate"	February 1899	The Strand Magazine	Round the Fire story
"The Story of B.24"	March 1899	The Strand Magazine	Round the Fire story
"The Story of the Latin Tutor"	April 1899	The Strand Magazine	Round the Fire story
"The Story of the Brown Hand"	May 1899	The Strand Magazine	Round the Fire story
"The Croxley Master"	October – December 1899	The Strand Magazine	serialised in three parts
"The Crime of the Brigadier"	January 1900	The Strand Magazine	Brigadier Gerard story
Hilda Wade, 11	January 1900	The Strand Magazine	completion of novel by Grant Allen
Hilda Wade, 12	February 1900	The Strand Magazine	completion of novel by Grant Allen
"Playing with Fire"	March 1900	The Strand Magazine	
"An Impression of the Regency"	August 1900	Frank Leslie's Popular Monthly	
"A Glimpse of the Army"	September 1900	The Strand Magazine	
"Some Military Lessons of the War"	October 1900	The Cornhill Magazine	
"The Military Lessons of the War, a Rejoinder"	January 1901	The Cornhill Magazine	
"The Holocaust of Manor Place"	March 1901	The Strand Magazine	"Strange Studies From Life" article
"The Love Affair of George Vincent Parker"	April 1901	The Strand Magazine	"Strange Studies From Life" article
"The Debatable Case of Mrs Emsley"	May 1901	The Strand Magazine	"Strange Studies From Life" article
"A British Commando"	June 1901	The Strand Magazine	
The Hound of the Baskervilles	August 1901 – April 1902	The Strand Magazine	Sherlock Holmes novel; serialised over nine months
"How Brigadier Gerard Lost an Ear"	August 1902	The Strand Magazine	Brigadier Gerard story
"How the Brigadier Saved the Army"	November 1902	The Strand Magazine	Brigadier Gerard story
"How the Brigadier Rose to Minsk"	December 1902	The Strand Magazine	Brigadier Gerard story
"Brigadier Gerard at Waterloo"	January – February 1903	The Strand Magazine	Brigadier Gerard story
"The Brigadier in England"	March 1903	The Strand Magazine	Brigadier Gerard story
"How the Brigadier Joined the Hussars at Conflans"	April 1903	The Strand Magazine	Brigadier Gerard story
"How Etienne Gerard Said Goodbye to his Master"	May 1903	The Strand Magazine	Brigadier Gerard story
"The Leather Funnel"	June 1903	The Strand Magazine	
"The Adventure of the Empty House"	October 1903	The Strand Magazine	Sherlock Holmes story
"The Adventure of the Norwood Builder"	November 1903	The Strand Magazine	Sherlock Holmes story
"The Adventure of the Dancing Men"	December 1903	The Strand Magazine	Sherlock Holmes story
"The Adventure of the Solitary Cyclist"	January 1904	The Strand Magazine	Sherlock Holmes story
"The Adventure of the Priory School"	February 1904	The Strand Magazine	Sherlock Holmes story
"The Adventure of Black Peter"	March 1904	The Strand Magazine	Sherlock Holmes story
"The Adventure of Charles Augustus Milverton"	April 1904	The Strand Magazine	Sherlock Holmes story
"The Adventure of the Six Napoleons"	May 1904	The Strand Magazine	Sherlock Holmes story
"The Adventure of the Three Students"	June 1904	The Strand Magazine	Sherlock Holmes story
"The Adventure of the Golden Pince-Nez"	July 1904	The Strand Magazine	Sherlock Holmes story
"The Adventure of the Missing Three-Quarter"	August 1904	The Strand Magazine	Sherlock Holmes story
"The Adventure of the Abbey Grange"	September 1904	The Strand Magazine	Sherlock Holmes story
"The Adventure of the Second Stain"	December 1904	The Strand Magazine	Sherlock Holmes story
"The Great Brown-Pericord Motor"	January 1905	The Pictorial Magazine	
Sir Nigel	December 1905 – December 1906	The Strand Magazine	serialised over 13 issues
"An Incursion into Diplomacy"	June 1906	The Cornhill Magazine	
"Through the Magic Door"	November 1906 – October 1907	Cassell's Magazine	
"The Pot of Caviare"	March 1908	The Strand Magazine	
"The Silver Mirror"	August 1908	The Strand Magazine	
"The Singular Experience of Mr. John Scott Eccles"	September 1908	The Strand Magazine	Sherlock Holmes story; published in book form as first part of "The Adventure of Wisteria Lodge"
"The Tiger of San Pedro"	October 1908	The Strand Magazine	Sherlock Holmes story; published in book form as second part of "The Adventure of Wisteria Lodge"
"The Adventure of the Bruce-Partington Plans"	December 1908	The Strand Magazine	Sherlock Holmes story
"Shakespeare's Expostulation"	March 1909	The Cornhill Magazine	
"Bendy's Sermon"	April 1909	The Strand Magazine	story in verse
"The Lord of Falconbridge"	August 1909	The Strand Magazine	
"Some Recollections of Sport"	September 1909	The Strand Magazine	
"The Home-Coming"	December 1909	The Strand Magazine	
"The Terror of Blue John Gap"	August 1910	The Strand Magazine	
"The Marriage of the Brigadier"	September 1910	The Strand Magazine	Brigadier Gerard story
"The Last Galley"	November 1910	The London Magazine	
"The Coming of the Huns"	November 1910	Scribner's Magazine	"Through the Mists" story
"The Adventure of the Devil's Foot"	December 1910	The Strand Magazine	Sherlock Holmes story
"The Passing of the Legions"	December 1910	The London Magazine	
"The First Cargo"	December 1910	Scribner's Magazine	"Through the Mists" story
"The Red Star"	January 1911	Scribner's Magazine	"Through the Mists" story
"The Adventure of the Red Circle"	March – April 1911	The Strand Magazine	Sherlock Holmes story
"The Contest"	March 1911	Pearson's Magazine	
"The Blighting of Sharkey"	April 1911	Pearson's Magazine	Captain Sharkey story
"The Giant Maximin"	July 1911	The Literary Pageant	
"One Crowded Hour"	August 1911	The Strand Magazine	
"What Reform is Needed?"	September 1911	The Strand Magazine	
"The Disappearance of Lady Frances Carfax"	December 1911	The Strand Magazine	Sherlock Holmes story
The Lost World	April – November 1912	The Strand Magazine	Professor Challenger story
"The Fall of Lord Barrymore"	December 1912	The Strand Magazine	
The Poison Belt	March – July 1913	The Strand Magazine	Professor Challenger story
"England and the Next War"	1913	The Fortnightly Review	
"How it Happened"	September 1913	The Strand Magazine	
"'Borrow'-ed Scenes"	September 1913	The Pall Mall Magazine	Pastiche of the writing style of linguist/philologist, pedestrian and author George Borrow
"The Horror of the Heights"	November 1913	The Strand Magazine	
"The Adventure of the Dying Detective"	December 1913	The Strand Magazine	Sherlock Holmes story
"Essays Upon Phases of the Great War"	1914	The Fortnightly Review	
"Danger!"	July 1914	The Strand Magazine	
The Valley of Fear	September 1914 – May 1915	The Strand Magazine	Sherlock Holmes novel; serialised over nine issues
"Western Wanderings"	January – April 1915	The Cornhill Magazine	
"An Outing in War Time"	October 1915	The Strand Magazine	
"Stranger than Fiction"	December 1915	The Strand Magazine	
"The Prisoner's Defence"	February 1916	The Strand Magazine	
"The British Campaign in France"	April 1916 – June 1917	The Strand Magazine	serialised over fifteen months
"Is Sir Oliver Lodge Right that the Dead Can Communicate with the Living?"	July 1917	The Strand Magazine	
"What Will England be Like in 1930?"	August 1917	The Strand Magazine	
"His Last Bow"	September 1917	The Strand Magazine	Sherlock Holmes story
"Some Personalia about Mr Sherlock Holmes"	December 1917	The Strand Magazine	Sherlock Holmes-related article
"A Chat About Children, Snakes and Zebus"	April 1918	The Strand Magazine	"Three of Them" story
"About Cricket"	April 1918	The Strand Magazine	"Three of Them" story
"The Battle of the Somme"	May – June 1918	The Strand Magazine	
"Speculations"	July 1918	The Strand Magazine	"Three of Them" story
"The Leatherskin Tribe"	July 1918	The Strand Magazine	"Three of Them" story
"The British Campaign in France"	October – November 1918	The Strand Magazine	
"About Naughtiness and Frogs and Historical Pictures"	December 1918	The Strand Magazine	"Three of Them" story
"The Battle of Cambrai"	January – February 1919	The Strand Magazine	
"Life After Death"	March 1919	The Strand Magazine	interview by Hayden Church
"The Uncharted Coast"	December 1919, January, May, September and November 1920	The Strand Magazine	
"The Sideric Pendulum"	August 1920	The Strand Magazine	
"Fairies Photographed"	December 1920	The Strand Magazine	
"The Evidence for Fairies"	March 1921	The Strand Magazine	
"The Uncharted Coast"	May 1921	The Strand Magazine	
"The Adventure of the Mazarin Stone"	October 1921	The Strand Magazine	Sherlock Holmes story
"The Bully of Brocas Court"	November 1921	The Strand Magazine	
"The Nightmare Room"	December 1921	The Strand Magazine	
"The Problem of Thor Bridge"	February – March 1922	The Strand Magazine	Sherlock Holmes story
"The Book I Most Enjoyed Writing"	March 1922	The Strand Magazine	contribution to symposium
"The Lift"	June 1922	The Strand Magazine	
"Now Then, Smith!"	July 1922	The Strand Magazine	
"A Point of Contact"	October 1922	The Story-Teller	
"Billy Bones"	December 1922	The Strand Magazine	
"The Centurion"	December 1922	The Story-Teller	
"The Cottingley Fairies"	February 1923	The Strand Magazine	
"The Adventure of the Creeping Man"	March 1923	The Strand Magazine	Sherlock Holmes story
"Haunting Dreams"	April 1923	The Strand Magazine	
"The Forbidden Subject"	August 1923	The Strand Magazine	
Memories and Adventures	October 1923 – July 1924	The Strand Magazine	autobiography; serialised over ten issues
"The Adventure of the Sussex Vampire"	January 1924	The Strand Magazine	Sherlock Holmes story
"How Our Novelists Write Their Books"	December 1924	The Strand Magazine	contribution to symposium
"The Adventure of the Three Garridebs"	January 1925	The Strand Magazine	Sherlock Holmes story
"The Adventure of the Illustrious Client"	February – March 1925	The Strand Magazine	Sherlock Holmes story
The Land of Mist	July 1925 – March 1926	The Strand Magazine	Professor Challenger story
"The Adventure of the Three Gables"	October 1926	The Strand Magazine	Sherlock Holmes story
"The Adventure of the Blanched Soldier"	November 1926	The Strand Magazine	Sherlock Holmes story
"The Adventure of the Lion's Mane"	December 1926	The Strand Magazine	Sherlock Holmes story
"The Adventure of the Retired Colourman"	January 1927	The Strand Magazine	Sherlock Holmes story
"The Adventure of the Veiled Lodger"	February 1927	The Strand Magazine	Sherlock Holmes story
"The Adventure of Shoscombe Old Place"	April 1927	The Strand Magazine	Sherlock Holmes story
"How I Made My List"	June 1927	The Strand Magazine	Sherlock Holmes-related essay
"W.G. Grace—A Memory"	July 1927	The Strand Magazine	
"Houdini the Enigma"	August – September 1927	The Strand Magazine	
"The Maracot Deep"	October 1927 – February 1928	The Strand Magazine	
"When the World Screamed"	April – May 1928	The Strand Magazine	Professor Challenger story
"The Dreamers—Notes from a Strange Mail Bag"	June 1928	The Strand Magazine	
"The Story of Spedegue's Dropper"	October 1928	The Strand Magazine	
"The Disintegration Machine"	January 1929	The Strand Magazine	Professor Challenger story
"The Lord of the Dark Face"	April – May 1929	The Strand Magazine	published in book form as the last two chapters of The Maracot Deep
"The Death Voyage"	October 1929	The Strand Magazine	
"The Parish Magazine"	August 1930	The Strand Magazine	
"The Last Resource"	8 August 1930	Liberty	also published in The Strand Magazine, December 1930
"The End of Devil Hawker"	23 August 1930	The Saturday Evening Post	also published in The Strand Magazine, November 1930

== Novels ==
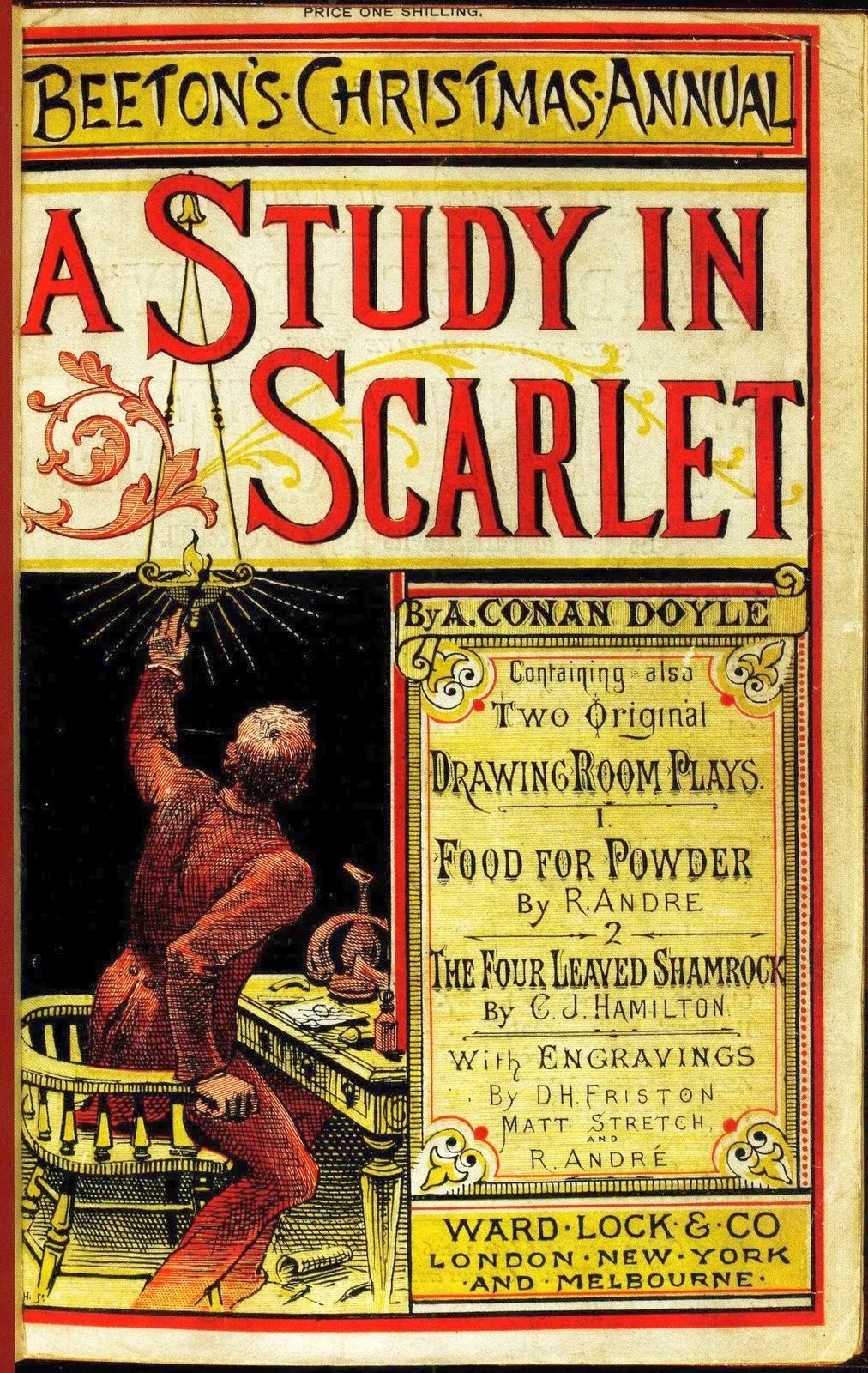
The cover page of the 1887 edition of Beeton's Christmas Annual, which contains Doyle's novel A Study in Scarlet

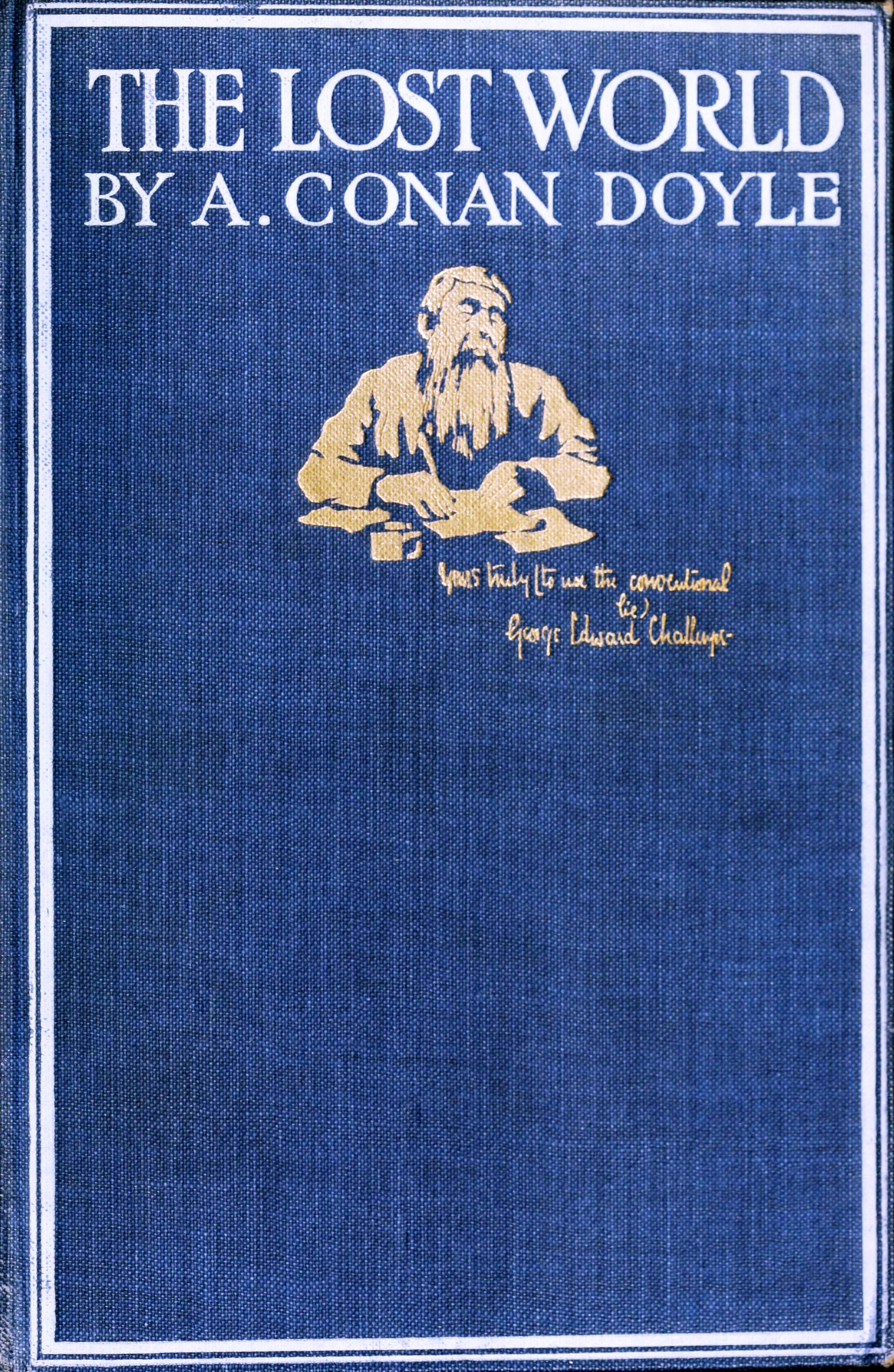
The cover page of the 1912 novel The Lost World

Novels by Doyle
Title	Year of first publication	First edition publisher (London, unless otherwise stated)	Series or genre	Notes
The Narrative of John Smith	1883 (2011)	British Library Publishing		Written in 1883, but lost. Found and published for the first time in 2011.
A Study in Scarlet	1887	Beeton's Christmas Annual	Sherlock Holmes	
Micah Clarke	1889	Longmans, Green & Co.	Historical fiction	
The Mystery of Cloomber	1889	Ward and Downey	Horror / adventure	
The Sign of the Four	1890	Spencer Blackett	Sherlock Holmes	Also appeared in Lippincott's Monthly Magazine in February 1890
The Firm of Girdlestone	1890	Chatto & Windus	Romance/adventure	
The White Company	1891	Smith, Elder & Co.	Historical fiction	First of three volumes
The Doings of Raffles Haw	1891	Cassell & Co	Social science fiction	
The Great Shadow	1892	J. W. Arrowsmith, Bristol	Historical fiction	In 1893 the second edition was published that also included Beyond the City
The Refugees	1893	Longmans, Green & Co.	Historical fiction	First of three volumes
The Parasite	1894	Constable & Co.	Horror/adventure	
The Stark Munro Letters	1895	Longmans, Green & Co.	–	
Rodney Stone	1896	Smith, Elder & Co.	Historical fiction	
Uncle Bernac	1897	Horace Cox	Historical fiction	
The Tragedy of the Korosko	1898	Smith, Elder & Co.	Historical fiction	
A Duet, with an Occasional Chorus	1899	Grant Richards	–	
The Hound of the Baskervilles	1902	George Newnes	Sherlock Holmes	
Sir Nigel	1906	Smith, Elder & Co.	Historical fiction	
The Lost World	1912	Hodder & Stoughton	Professor Challenger	
The Poison Belt	1913	Hodder & Stoughton	Professor Challenger	
The Valley of Fear	1915	Smith, Elder & Co.	Sherlock Holmes	
The Land of Mist	1926	Hutchinson & Co	Professor Challenger	
The Maracot Deep	1929	J. Murray & Sons	Horror / adventure	Novel with three short stories

== Short story collections ==
The Adventures of Sherlock Holmes, first published in 1892

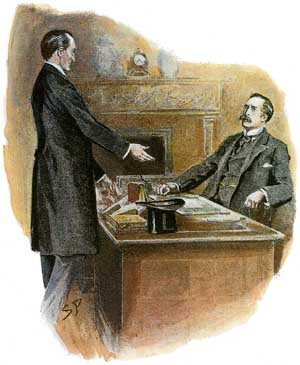
Sherlock Holmes and his biographer Dr. Watson

Short story collections by Doyle
Title	Year of first publication	First edition publisher (All London)	Series or genre
Mysteries and Adventures	1890	Scott	Mysteries
The Captain of the Polestar and Other Tales	1890	Longmans, Green	–
The Adventures of Sherlock Holmes	1892	George Newnes	Sherlock Holmes
The Gully of Bluemansdyke	1893	Scott	Mysteries
The Memoirs of Sherlock Holmes	1894	George Newnes	Sherlock Holmes
Round the Red Lamp: Being Facts and Fancies of Medical Life	1894	Methuen	–
Strange Secrets	1895	R.F. Fenno and Company	Mysteries
The Exploits of Brigadier Gerard	1896	George Newnes	Brigadier Gerard
The Green Flag and Other Stories of War and Sport	1900	Smith, Elder & Co.	–
The Adventures of Gerard	1903	George Newnes	Brigadier Gerard
The Return of Sherlock Holmes	1905	George Newnes	Sherlock Holmes
Round the Fire Stories	1908	Smith, Elder & Co.	–
The Last Galley	1911	Smith, Elder & Co.	–
His Last Bow	1917	John Murray	Sherlock Holmes
Danger! and Other Stories	1918	John Murray	–
Tales of Terror and Mystery	1922	John Murray	–
Three of Them	1923	John Murray	–
The Case-Book of Sherlock Holmes	1927	John Murray	Sherlock Holmes

== Stage works ==
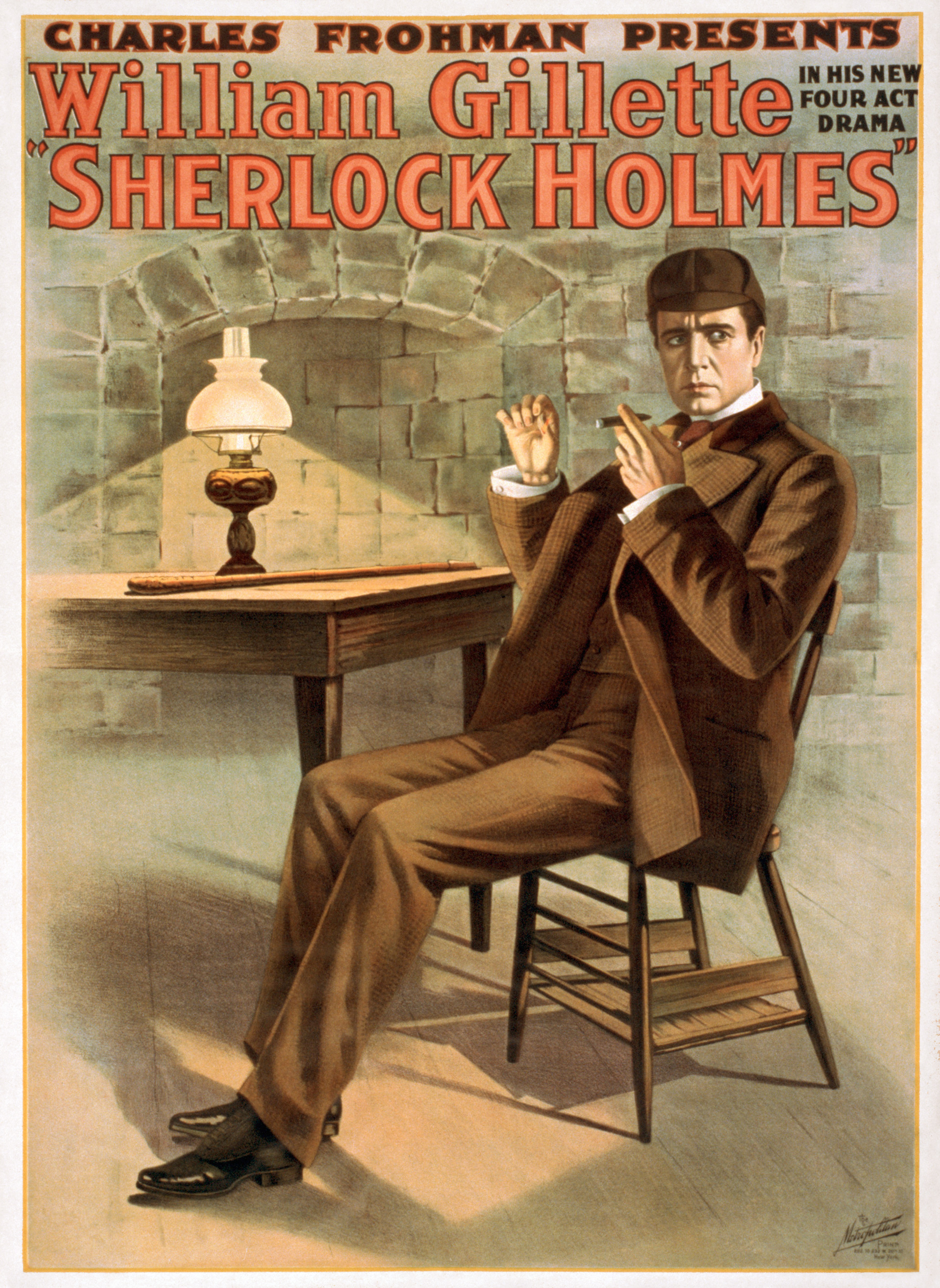
Poster for Sherlock Holmes

Stage works of Doyle
Title	Location of first performance	Date of first performance	Year of publication	Publisher (London, unless otherwise stated)	Notes
Jane Annie; or, The Good Conduct Prize	London	1893	1893	Chappell & Co.	Libretto to operetta, with J.M. Barrie; music by Ernest Ford
Foreign Policy	London	1893	–	–	Based on A Question of Diplomacy
The Story of Waterloo	Bristol	1894	1907	Samuel French Ltd.	A one-act play written for Sir Henry Irving
Brothers	Aberdeen	1899		–	Based on novel Halves by James Payn
Sherlock Holmes	London	1899	1922	Samuel French Ltd.	With William Gillette
A Duet	London	1902	1903	Samuel French Ltd.	
Brigadier Gerard	London	1906	1986	Gaslight, Bloomington, IN	
The Fires of Fate	Liverpool	1909	–	–	
The House of Temperley	London	1910	–	–	
A Pot of Caviare	London	1910	–	–	
The Speckled Band	London	1910	1912	Samuel French Ltd.	
The Crown Diamond	Bristol	1921	1958	Privately printed	
Angels of Darkness: A Drama in Three Acts	–	–	2001	The Baker Street Irregulars in cooperation with the Toronto Public Library, New York, NY	

== Poetry ==
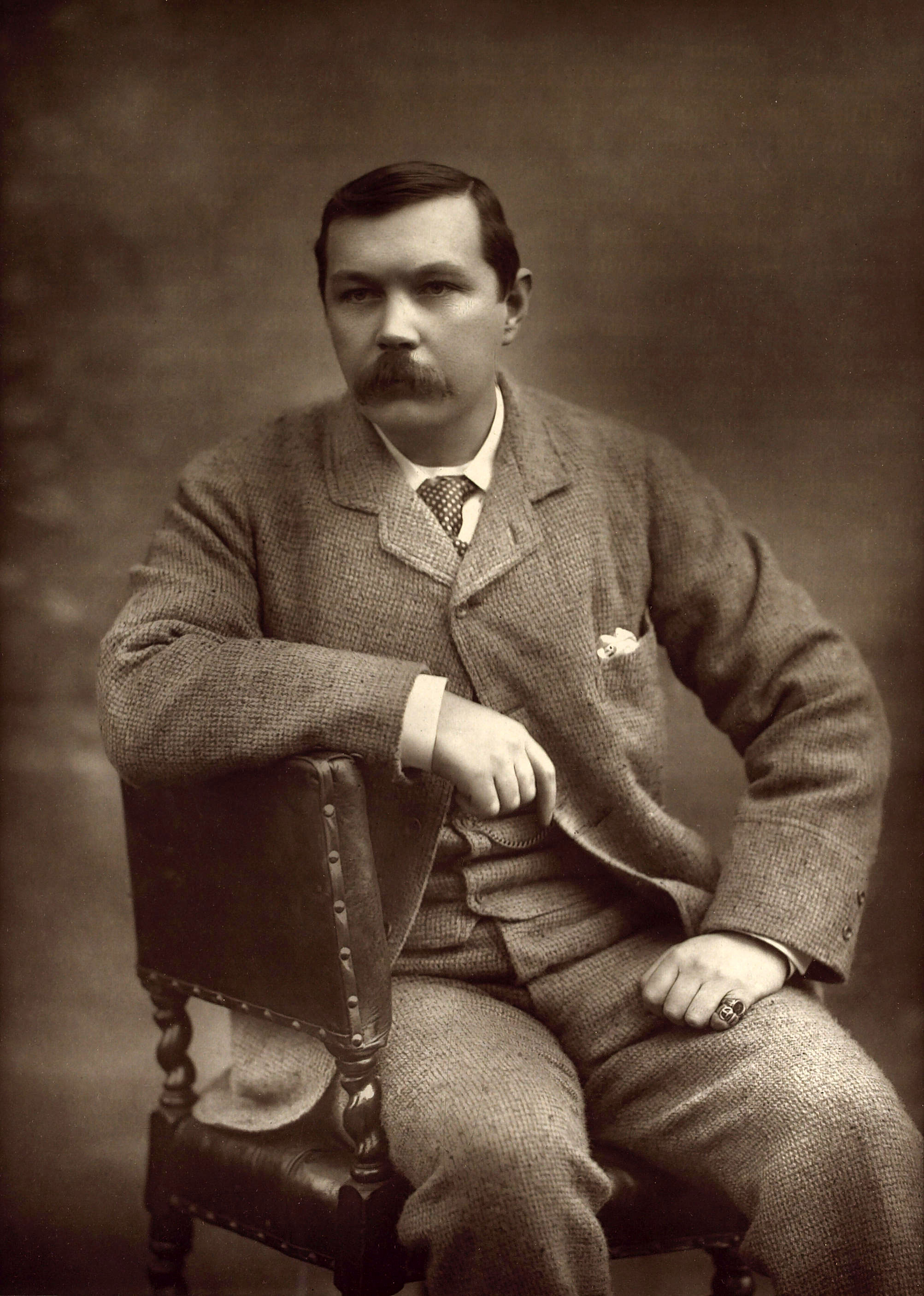
Doyle in 1893

The majority of Doyle's poetry falls into the genre of war poetry.

Doyle's poetry
Title	Year of first publication	First edition publisher (All London)
Songs of Action	1898	Smith, Elder & Co.
Songs of the Road	1911	Smith, Elder & Co.
The Guards Came Through, and Other Poems	1919	J. Murray
The Poems of Arthur Conan Doyle: Collected Edition	1922	J. Murray

== Non-fiction ==
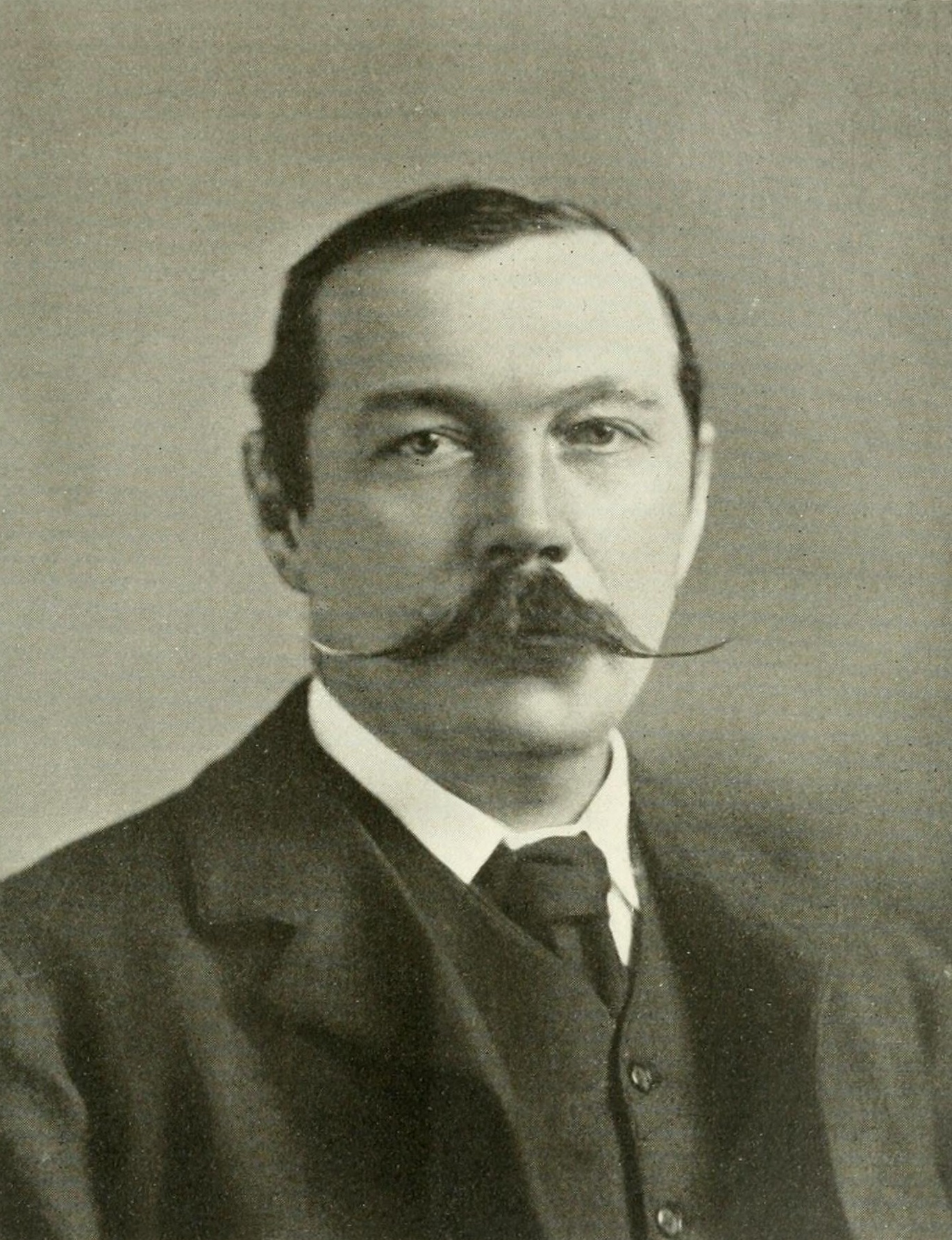
Doyle, c. 1904

Non-fiction books by Doyle
Title	Year of first publication	First edition publisher (All London)	Topic
The Great Boer War	1900	Smith, Elder & Co.	Military history
The War in South Africa – Its Cause and Conduct	1902	Smith, Elder & Co.	Military history
Through the Magic Door	1907	Smith, Elder & Co.	Memoir of the books in Doyle's library
The Crime of the Congo	1909	Hutchinson	History
The Case of Oscar Slater	1912	Hodder & Stoughton	Crime
The German War: Some Sidelights and Reflections	1914	Hodder & Stoughton	Military history
A Visit to Three Fronts	1916	Hodder & Stoughton	Military history
The British Campaign in France and Flanders	1916–20 (Note: Six volume work published over two years.)	Hodder & Stoughton	Military history
Memories and Adventures	1924	Hodder & Stoughton	Autobiography
Dangerous Work: Diary of an Arctic Adventure	2012	The British Library Publishing Division	Autobiography

== Spiritualist and paranormal works ==
=== Books ===
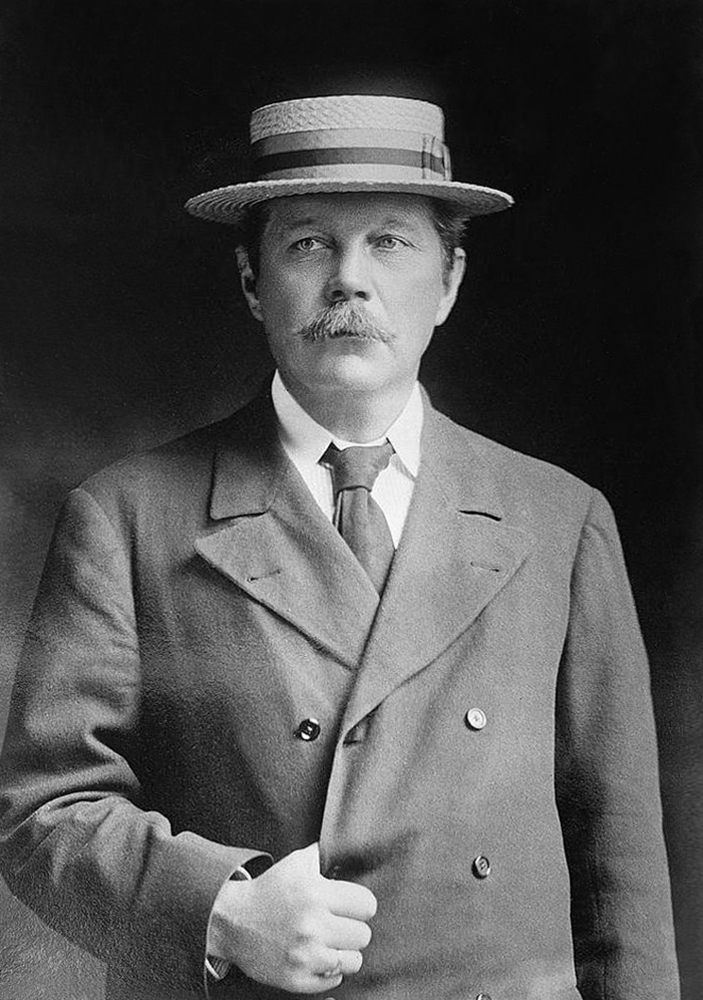
Doyle in 1913

Spiritualist and paranormal books by Doyle
Title	Year of first publication	First edition publisher (All London)
The New Revelation	1918	Hodder & Stoughton
The Vital Message	1919	Hodder & Stoughton
Verbatim Report of a Public Debate on 'The Truth of Spiritualism' between Sir Arthur Conan Doyle and Joseph McCabe	1920	Watts & Co
The Wanderings of a Spiritualist	1921	Hodder & Stoughton
The Coming of the Fairies	1922	Hodder & Stoughton
The Case for Spirit Photography	1922	Hutchinson
Our American Adventure	1923	Hodder & Stoughton
Our Second American Adventure	1924	Hodder & Stoughton
The Spiritualist's Reader	1924	Two Worlds Publishing Company
The History of Spiritualism	1926	Cassell
Pheneas Speaks	1927	Psychic Press
Our African Winter	1929	John Murray
The Edge of the Unknown	1930	John Murray

=== Pamphlets ===
Spiritualist and paranormal pamphlets by Doyle
Title	Year of first publication	First edition publisher (London, unless otherwise stated)	Pages
A Full Report of a Lecture on Spiritualism Delivered by Sir Arthur Conan Doyle at the Connaught Hall, Worthing on Friday July 11th 1919	1919	The Worthing Gazette	11
Our reply to the Cleric: Sir Arthur Conan Doyle's Lecture in Leicester, October 19th 1919	1920	Spiritualists' National Union, Halifax	16
Spiritualism and Rationalism	1920	Hodder & Stoughton	32
The Early Christian Church and Modern Spiritualism	1925	Psychic Bookshop and Library	12
Psychic Experiences	1925	G. P. Putnam's Sons, New York	12
A Word of Warning	1928	Psychic Bookshop and Library	19
What Does Spiritualism Actually Teach and Stand For?	1928	Psychic Bookshop and Library	16
The Roman Catholic Church: A Rejoinder	1929	Psychic Press	72
An Open Letter to Those of My Generation	1929	Psychic Press	12
The New Revelation	1997	Rupert Books, Cambridge	32

== Notes and references ==
=== Sources ===
- Ashley, Mike (April 2008). "Sherlock Holmes in The Strand". The Book and Magazine Collector (295). Diamond Publishing Group.
- Dalby, Richard (July 1992). "The Horror and Adventure Stories of Sir Arthur Conan Doyle". The Book and Magazine Collector (100). Diamond Publishing Group.
- Dalby, Richard (February 1995). "The Historical Fiction of Sir Arthur Conan Doyle". The Book and Magazine Collector (131). Diamond Publishing Group.
- Dalby, Richard (March 1998). "Arthur Conan Doyle and the Paranormal". The Book and Magazine Collector (168). Diamond Publishing Group.
- Dudley Edwards, Owen (2004). "Doyle, Sir Arthur Ignatius Conan (1859–1930)". Oxford Dictionary of National Biography (online ed.). Oxford University Press. doi:10.1093/ref:odnb/32887. (Subscription, Wikipedia Library access or UK public library membership required.)
- Grella, George; Dematteis, Philip B. (1983). "Sir Arthur Conan Doyle". In Fredeman, William E.; Nadel, Ira B. (eds.). Dictionary of Literary Biography: Victorian Novelists after 1885. Detroit: Gale Research. ISBN 978-0-8103-1143-5.
- Locke, Harold (1928). A Bibliographical Catalogue of the Writings of Sir Arthur Conan Doyle MD, LLD. Tunbridge Wells: D Webster. OCLC 3698003.
- Lycett, Andrew (2008). Conan Doyle: The Man Who Created Sherlock Holmes. London: Phoenix. ISBN 978-0-7538-2428-3.
- Meer, Michael (Winter 2024). "The Methods of Sherlock Holmes: The 'Examination Paper' of 1893's Author Revealed". The Baker Street Journal. The Baker Street Irregulars.
