= The Merchants Daughter of Bristow =

Song

The Merchants Daughter of Bristow is an English broadside ballad from the 17th century about a young woman who defies her father and follows her lover to Italy, where she saves him from religious persecution and execution. Also known as Maudlin the Merchants Daughter. Copies of the broadside can be found in the British Library, the University of Glasgow Library, and Magdalene College, Cambridge.

== Synopsis ==
The narrator begins by introducing the ballad as a "touchstone of true love." Maudlin, the merchant's daughter of Bristow, falls in love with a young man even though her friends don't like him and her father sends him away to Italy. He sings to her from below her balcony before he leaves, but she doesn't reply because she's afraid of her father's anger. The man leaves for Padua, and she vows to follow him. She wakes up early and sneaks downstairs, where she finds sailors in her parlor. She asks one of the sailors to take her to Padua, where she says she has a brother who is sick. She desperately wants to see her brother, she says, but her father won't let her go. She asks for some ship boy's garments and dresses up. Her mother realizes that she's gone and comes downstairs. She gives the "youth" money to find her daughter, not recognizing that the boy is actually her daughter in disguise.

In the second part of the ballad, she arrives in Italy. Her lover has been condemned to die by the Inquisition unless he converts to Catholicism. He says goodbye to his friends, especially Maudlin. Maudlin takes her boy's clothes off and her master falls in love with her, telling her that he will do anything for her. She asks him to free her lover, who she is still pretending is her brother, and to send him to an English friar, who is actually the sailor in costume. She uses this ploy to get herself condemned to die with him in the same fire. When the judges see how much they love each other, they agree to let them live and send them back to England. When they get back to Bristow, her father is dead and they are free to be married.

== Cultural and historical significance ==
Dianne Dugaw cites The Merchants Daughter of Bristow as one of the earliest "Female Warriors of English balladry"

=== In popular culture ===
A play by the same name is mentioned in Sir Arthur Conan Doyle's adventure novel Micah Clarke (1889). The eponymous narrator mentions the play as the best of all the plays in Portsdown Hill he saw when he was a boy.

A version of the song was recorded by Dave & Toni Arthur on The Lark in the Morning (2009)
