= The Firm of Girdlestone =

1890 novel by Arthur Conan Doyle

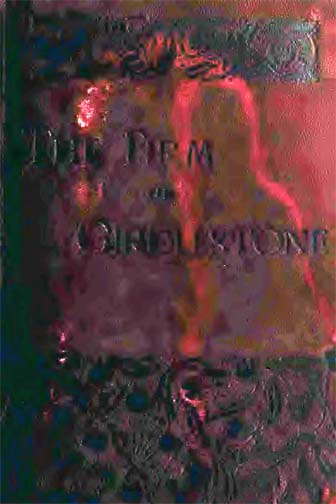
- Cover of the first edition of The Firm of Girdlestone
- Author: Arthur Conan Doyle
- Language: English
- Genre: novel
- Publisher: Chatto and Windus
- Publication date: 1890
- Publication place: United Kingdom
- Media type: Print (Hardback)
- Pages: 399
- Preceded by: The Mystery of Cloomber
- Followed by: The Captain of the Polestar, and other tales
- Text: The Firm of Girdlestone at Wikisource

The Firm of Girdlestone is a novel by British author Sir Arthur Conan Doyle. It was first published in 1890 by Chatto and Windus in London, England. In 1915 a silent film adaptation The Firm of Girdlestone was made. A 1958 BBC television adaptation The Firm of Girdlestone was also produced.

== Plot summary ==
John Girdlestone owns the firm of Girdlestone. It is a very lucrative business and John Girdlestone and his son Ezra Girdlestone are respected by everyone. Both father and son are cynics and have no other thought but for their business; after giving a donation of £25 for charity, John Girdlestone remarks to himself that it is not a bad "investment", as it will make a favourable impression on the collector, who is a Member of Parliament, whose influence he hopes to use some day. Ezra, his son, is even more of a cynic, as the elder Girdlestone's cynicism is mitigated by his supposed religiosity. However, he manifests a great acumen for business, sometimes even surpassing his father's sharpness in business matters. A series of disastrous speculations by the elder Girdlestone financially ruins the firm. After keeping the impending bankruptcy a secret from everyone for a time, he tells his son (whom he has fooled with a dummy ledger) about it. The son is disgusted by his father's rashness.

They resort to chicanery to save the firm. They plan to send an agent to the Ural Mountains who will claim to have found diamond mines. They speculate that the resulting plunge in the prices of diamonds in England and South Africa will force the dealers to get rid of their diamonds quickly at absurdly cheap rates to avoid total financial ruin, which would eventually fall on them if diamonds from the Urals start pouring in the market. They will then step in and buy as many diamonds as their remaining money would allow them. Once their capital is exhausted, their agent will disappear and the discovery that the Ural diamond mines were a hoax would skyrocket the prices of diamonds once again, leaving them rich men.

Their plan works perfectly and the prices go down just as they had expected. Ezra Girdlestone travels to South Africa to buy from the dealers there while John Girdlestone starts buying in London. After they spend all their money on diamonds and get ready to call their agent back from the Urals, their plan collapses with the discovery of bona fide diamond mines in South Africa. As a fellow conspirator tells Ezra in South Africa: "Russia or no Russia, the prices will not go up!" He goes back to England and both of them sell their diamonds cheaply, which leaves them in an even more precarious situation than they already were in.

A very old friend of John Girdlestone had entrusted his daughter to him before dying. She was heir to £40,000 which she would inherit upon coming of age. John Girdlestone persuades his son to seduce the girl and marry her so that they could get their hands on the money. Ezra fails miserably not only because he is totally inept in romance, but because the girl is already in love with another man. Having exhausted all their means, John Girdlestone decides on a sinister plan. His friend's will provides that if the girl dies before coming of age, John Girdlestone becomes the sole heir. He plans to murder the girl. His son does not favour this plan, but his father persuades him, telling him that it will make the firm rich again.
