= The Narrative of John Smith =

2011 novel by Arthur Conan Doyle

The Narrative Of John Smith
- Title page, The Narrative of John Smith
- Author: Arthur Conan Doyle
- Language: English
- Genre: Narrative fiction novel
- Published: 2011 The British Library
- Media type: Print (Hardback)
- Pages: 120
- ISBN: 978-0-7123-5841-5

The Narrative of John Smith (2011) is a novel written in 1883 by Arthur Conan Doyle, published posthumously by The British Library. In a work of narrative fiction, Doyle writes from the perspective of a middle-aged bachelor named John Smith recovering from rheumatic gout. Unlike his later work in detective fiction, fantasy, and science fiction, this novel unfolds through a series of tangential, essay-like thoughts stemming from observations on everyday life. The subjects are of a “personal-social-political complexion”.

== Synopsis ==
=== Plot ===
Each day is represented by a chapter.

Beginning with John Smith's diagnosis of rheumatic gout, the doctor confines him to bed rest for one week; Smith conveys his dismay, then reluctantly accepts. Dr. Turner encourages Smith that the mind can “make a heaven of hell” and that he should set to work writing a book. They begin to debate the circumstances which might drive talent out of a man, and after the doctor exits, Smith considers the immense service a doctor contributes to the world. After many short, uncorrelated thoughts, Smith dwells on his surroundings as stimulants and companions (and his particular affinity for knick-knacks). This leads the internal conversation towards personal anecdotes and various thoughts on a broad spectrum. Smith describes his landlady, Mrs. Rundle, and observes her three children on their way home fighting over a penny. Because of this, he notes, “Remember that the era of civilization is but the narrow golden border which trims the dense blackness of primeval history.”

The second chapter begins with the Doctor, discussing current medical topics with Smith. Left to his own devices alone again, Smith expresses hopes for Lamarckism: the eradication of disease and eventually of the perfection of the human race through education and invention. He introduces his neighbors, the Olivers: an old man and his daughter, a painter about the age of thirty. The two have fallen on hard times and Smith secretly commissions Miss Oliver through Mrs. Rundle. Smith debates Roman Catholicism as the Doctor defends Anglican Protestantism upon his return. Afterwards, a veteran known as “the Major” enters with a limp and grey eyes—they converse on the tragedy of war, condemning Imperialism.

Smith reveals himself as an art enthusiast, while he observes Miss Oliver paint. He then tells a joke about his poverty during the gold rush in Australia—his friends having bought scrap meat claiming it was for dogs. This leads Smith to analyze humor, then genius, and instinct, after which he writes about the labors of writing, including instruction as well as opinion on popular literature.

Looking for something to debate, Smith asks the Doctor about the ideal conditions for human life and if eternal life can be attained. This leads into his thoughts about evolution leaving the human race hairless and toothless, eventually becoming demigods. Smith briefly mourns the present plagued condition of humanity, grieving and dying. The Major enters, suited for war claiming able-bodiedness at age sixty, ready to fight the Russians advancing towards China, at which the narrator is greatly alarmed and internally states the Major's uncharacteristic over eagerness for war. Smith reflects on the medicinal goal of lengthening human life compared to war, slaying for the greater good, and which is true philanthropy.

Without prior notice, Miss Oliver visits Smith, revealing her knowledge of his commission through Mrs. Rundle and thanking him. Showing him the drawings, he approves cordially, though he detests them. She notes that his room is decorated with masterpieces, to which he responds that he is speculating about her impending fame. He requests another picture, but she declines on the grounds of her wedding the next month. Upon her departure, Smith considers marriage “the great female destiny—to become the supplement of a man”. His thoughts continue onto Britain's political standing among the nations of the world, the unpredictability of literary success, and the creation of man. A curate visits, listening to Smith's opinions about Jesus Christ, Creation, and organized religion, questioning if he is a “dissenter”, then determining that he is a prideful infidel, leaving insulted.

The final chapter is of Smith and the doctor discussing disease as a battle; the doctor pronounces Smith's victory. They begin to discuss leucocytes in the bloodstream when the manuscript ends.

=== Characters ===
The introduction describes the novel's loosely developed characters as “extensions of [the narrator]”. Their purpose in many scenarios seems to be to probe the inner workings of John Smith through action or dialogue. Some of the characters, however, became prototypes for more developed characters in the Sherlock Holmes stories.

John Smith is a fifty-year-old man confined to bed rest for one week on account of rheumatic gout. The novel, being told from his point of view, consists of conscious thought as well as dialogue on contemporary topics with external figures. He characterizes himself by his activeness (a continuous reminder of his physical state) and identity as an art enthusiast and writer.

A photograph of Arthur Conan Doyle in The Narrative of John Smith.

The doctor begins as Dr. Turner, but midway through chapter two changes to Dr. Pontiphobus, in chapter four becomes Dr. Julep, and in chapter six loses his name to simply “doctor”. The morphing of his name may suggest his various purposes throughout. Noted by the editors, “In the name ‘Dr. Pontiphobus’ Conan Doyle may have been suggesting ‘aversion to Pontiffs,’ or Popes—i.e., the Roman Catholic Church, which he had renounced without having embraced Dr. Pontiphobus's Anglican Church instead.’ Julep is supposedly a Middle English slang term for a syrupy substance used to sweeten medicine. This is his name during a debate between Roman Catholicism, of which Smith becomes an advocate, and Anglican Protestantism, defended by the doctor. In other scenarios, the doctor humors Smith in short-lived discussions oscillating between religion and disease, one example being medical research on splenic fever in cattle. He functions primarily as a friend to John Smith.

Mrs. Rundle, John Smith’s landlady, is a minor caretaker of John. More than once, John equates her behavior to generalizations about the female sex. In chapter two, he recounts her insisting on using mustard to remedy his gout, relating this tendency to “the average woman”. Later on, he remarks after Mrs. Rundle has talked with him about her life as a widow, “Strange how women love to talk of what has been saddest in their loves. Even in the lowest orders a man usually keeps his past griefs to himself while a woman cackles them forth to anyone who will listen to her.” Smith, though at times frustrated, generally appreciates Mrs. Rundle's company and service. She acts as a motherly figure to Smith. Mrs. Rundle is a preliminary character of Arthur Conan Doyle, later developed into Mrs. Hudson in the Sherlock Holmes series.

Smith is visited by his neighbor, an unnamed army Major, who expresses the need for war in order to exert power over England's formidable neighbor, China. Smith thinks, “I suppose that every country is afflicted with ultra-patriots of this explosive type. Jingoism, Chauvinism, Panslavism, Spread-eagleism, it breaks out in nasty blotches all over the globe, and a very unhealthy irritative condition it is.” This character is contrasted by a previous conversation with the same character about the negative effects and lightheartedness of statesmen declaring war.

Miss Oliver is an artist whom Smith observes through his window. Although there is no personal relation, he secretly commissions her to give her a source of income due to her father's unemployment. She is an object of attention for John Smith.

The Curate makes a brief appearance, drawing out Smith's opinions on the person of Jesus Christ and organized religion, exiting hotly and offended.

Mrs. Rundle's three children are used in the second chapter to illustrate the nature of mankind as they fight over a penny outside Smith's window.

=== Genre ===
The Narrative of John Smith is Conan Doyle's first attempt to make the transition from short story writer to novelist. Conan Doyle expressed uncertainty in his developing abilities as a novelist as well in 1884. The introduction prefaces the style of his first writing: “There is very little in the way of plot or characterisation: the work is essentially a series of lengthy reflections on contemporary debates occupying the young Conan Doyle in his early twenties.”

In The Narrative, observations of neighbors outside Smith's window fuel some internal conversations, others are initiated between him and his doctor, and others by unexpected guests. Smith expresses thoughts on a variety of topics ranging from the innate goodness of mankind to then current literature. These many scattered reflections are reassembled in a number of other works throughout Conan Doyle's career.

=== Themes ===
A recurring theme in The Narrative is the idealization of science and the forces working in opposition. Smith praises the doctor for his altruistic work and discusses emerging theories for the betterment of mankind. He hopes for the near eradication of disease and criminal activity through invention and human moralistic evolution over time. This hope, from the perspective of a plagued man, becomes a continual source of hope.

War and imperial power exemplifies a threat to the well-being of humanity in The Narrative. Smith's neighbor, the Major, appears a man of sixty in poor condition because of the past war, humbled by circumstances. A few days later, the old man enters Smith's room hotly, declaring war on the Russians for an event of little consequence. The event strikes Smith as one who has little regard for human life and too much patriotic ambition. This mindset is set as the enemy of medicine, a force working to revive humanity.

The role and value of women appears through Smith's observation of and interaction with the characters Mrs. Rundle and Miss Oliver. Smith consistently admirers Miss Oliver from his window, commissioning her based on her observed character rather than merit. His estimation of her (and as he reveals of womankind) is based primarily upon her sexuality and place within marriage, terming marriage “the great female destiny”. Mrs. Rundle, on the other hand, is valuable to Smith because of her friendship and service, though she is widowed with children.

Religion is a topic of debate both between Smith and the doctor and Smith and the curate. Though the doctor tends to disagree with some of Smith's assertions regarding Anglican Protestantism, he nevertheless listens and interacts respectfully. The curate, on the other hand, readily condemns Smith, leaving offended by his opinions. The disjunction between the characters reflects and describes Smith's complications with organized religion.

== Literary and historical background ==
=== Publication ===
Originally written and submitted for publication in 1883, the manuscript was lost in the mail and never recovered. Conan Doyle reminisced ten years after the fact: "Alas for the dreadful thing that happened! The publishers never received it, the Post Office sent countless blue forms to say that they knew nothing about it, and from that day to this no word has ever been heard of it."

Conan Doyle attempted to rewrite the novel, but failed to bring this attempt to completion. Although the final chapter begins with a point of recovery and conclusion, a conversation between two men breaks mid-page, as noted in the published copy. The index notes that the rewritten manuscript of the novel is part fair copy and part working document; the first half contains copious visible editing while the latter pages are mostly unmarked.

In Conan Doyle's retrospective article about The Narrative, he also wrote, "I must confess that my shock at its disappearance would be as nothing to my horror if it were suddenly to appear again – in print." Though he would not have considered publishing this work, he continued to use quotes, character frames, and themes of The Narrative of John Smith in many of his other works, such as The Stark Munro Letters, "Through the Magic Door", A Study in Scarlet, and The Hound of the Baskervilles.

In 2004, the then untitled manuscript of Arthur Conan Doyle's rewritten unpublished first novel was purchased at auction by The British Library. It was first published in 2011 by The British Library, edited by Jon Lellenberg, Daniel Stashower, and Rachel Foss.

=== Biographical context ===
At the age of twenty-three when Conan Doyle wrote The Narrative of John Smith, the narrator expressed opinions on various contemporary topics. While some of the opinions of John Smith closely mimic those of Conan Doyle, some vary significantly.

John Smith reminisces about his days in the Australian gold-rush, claiming a “Bohemian disposition.” The editors note, “Young Conan Doyle was convinced that, despite his profession and his conformity to its cannons, his was a Bohemian disposition. Recounting his first visit to London, staying with his uncles and aunts, he wrote in Memories and Adventures: ‘I fear that I was too Bohemian for them and they too conventional for me.’ He felt he was Bohemian by nature, living a Bohemian life in Southsea, and transferred this posture to Sherlock Holmes, who Dr. Watson said ‘loathed every form of society with his whole Bohemian soul.’”

Image on the cover of The Narrative of John Smith.

Smith defines women by their value to a man and in marriage through Miss Oliver. “So she is going off to fulfil the great female destiny—to become the supplement of a man.” He writes that unmarried women are “still full of vague unrests, of dim ill-defined dissatisfaction, of a tendency to narrow ways and petty thoughts.” Though this one of the many sexist opinions of Smith, Conan Doyle most likely did not reflect these sentiments. After his father collapsed into alcoholism, his older sister's wages allowed the furthering of his education; he also maintained a strong relationship with his highly educated mother through letters. Editors note, “…in later years [he] became president and spokesman of the Divorce Law Reform Union, to make divorces easier and less disadvantageous for women to obtain.”

Many of Smith's thoughts are preoccupied with the labor of and attitudes toward writing, which seem to strongly echo personal experience of Arthur Conan Doyle. Smith writes about toiling over chapters, “If the secret history of literature could be written, the blighted hopes, the heart-sickening disappointments, the weary waiting, the wasted labour, it would be the saddest record ever penned…Very slowly and very laboriously, with much knitting of brows and burning of oil, the chapter is added to chapter…The articles which I sent forth came back to me at times with a rapidity and accuracy which spoke well for our postal arrangements.” Conan Doyle writes in his article My First Book, “Fifty little cylinders of manuscript did I send out during eight years, which described irregular orbits among publishers, and usually came back like paper boomerangs to the place that they had started from.” In A Life in Letters, he shares the difficulty of becoming an established author. Smith writes, “Robert Louis Stevenson appears to be one of the few who are capable of producing a first-class tale and who can still excel in a more sustained effort.” When Conan Doyle published his short story “ J. Habakuk Jephson’s Statement” anonymously in 1884 in The Cornhill, critics accredited the work to Robert Louis Stevenson, a comparison by which Conan Doyle was proud and flattered.

Though Conan Doyle was raised in the Roman Catholic tradition and attended a Jesuit school for his education, he became an agnostic before returning to spiritualism in 1916. The period in which this book was written may allude to some of Conan Doyle's personal opinions through Smith.

=== Criticism ===
In 2004, Tim Cornwell reports the purchase of Arthur Conan Doyle’s notebooks by the British Library in literary publication, The Scotsman. Cornwell notes the difficulty with which it was obtained from disputing descendants and the cultural significance of the work explained by professor Owen Dudley Edwards of the University of Edinburgh, “the book [is] a missing link in the Conan Doyle canon… It will tell an awful lot about the road to his becoming the author of the most famous literary characters of his time.”

In 2011, many newspapers around the world reported on the publication of Conan Doyle's first novel, including The New York Times, The Daily Star, Los Angeles Times, and more.

Many reviews of The Narrative of John Smith were written in 2011 and onward. James Kidd of the South China Morning Post writes, “The story behind The Narrative of John Smith is more compelling than the story contained within.” Kidd goes on to explain the purpose of the novel in relation to the beginning of Conan Doyle's career. Many of the early reactions to Conan Doyle's novel are exactly this: the critical purpose for The Narrative is in its relationship to him as an author, not particularly the work itself.

In 2012, Colin Fleming wrote in the Times Literary Supplement, “There are no henchmen afoot, nor lost worlds to escape from, but what one will find, on occasion, is that balance between place and voice that marks Conan Doyle’s later, and better, fiction… The drama of this novel is of a quiet kind.” The Narrative shows an author's rough work—a slur of ideas, later organized into cohesive stories with compelling plotlines.

== Footnotes ==
=== References ===
- Conan Doyle, Arthur (2011). The Narrative of John Smith. 96 Euston Road, London: The British Library. ISBN 978-0-7123-5841-5.
- Conan Doyle, Arthur. "My First Book". The Idler.
- Kidd, James (31 October 2011). "The Narrative of John Smith". South China Morning Post.
- Fleming, Colin (6 January 2012). "The Narrative of John Smith". Times Literary Supplement (5675): 20.
- Lebanon, Beirut (9 June 2011). "Conan Doyle's First Novel to See the Light of Day". The Daily Star.
- "QUICK TAKES; Conan Doyle Novel Due in Fall". Los Angeles Times. 8 June 2011.
- Cornwell, Tim (2 December 2004). "Conan Doyle's Lost First Novel Reveals Clues to His Success". The Scotsman.
