= The Mystery of Sasassa Valley =

- Short story by Arthur Conan Doyle
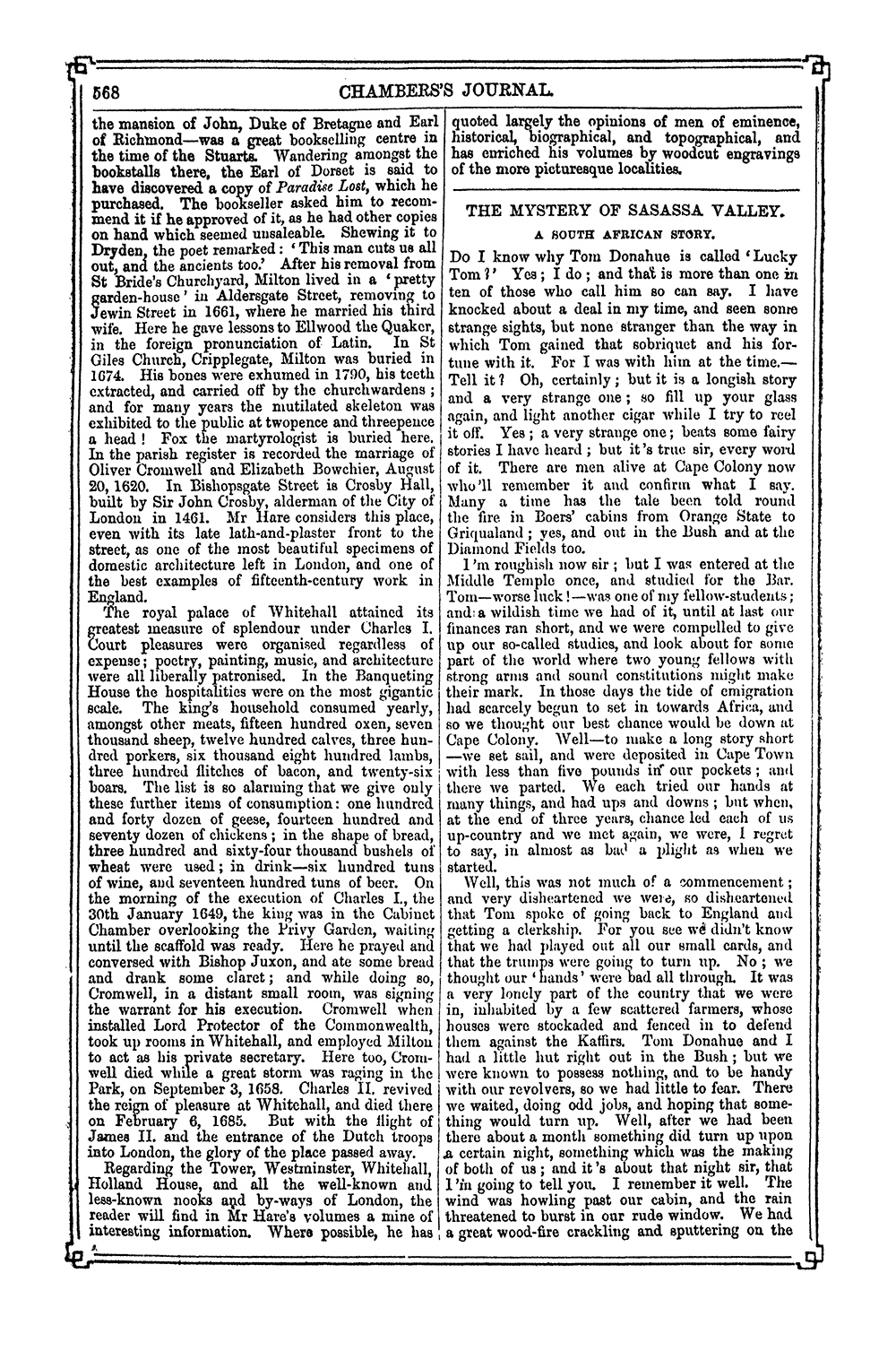

Text available at Wikisource
- Country: United Kingdom
- Language: English
- Genre: Short story

Publication
- Published in: Chambers's Edinburgh Journal
- Media type: Print, magazine
- Publication date: 6 September 1879

"The Mystery of Sasassa Valley" is a short story by Arthur Conan Doyle. Doyle's first published work of fiction, written while he was a student, it originally appeared anonymously in Chambers's Edinburgh Journal on 6 September 1879. The story is set in a valley in South Africa reputed to be inhabited by a demon with glowing eyes.

== Plot summary ==
Jack Turnbull and Tom Donahue are forced to give up studying to become lawyers after running out of money; they relocate to the Cape Colony in South Africa to seek their fortunes. Three years later, they have made little progress, and begin to consider returning to England. One night, they are visited in their cabin by their friend Dick Wharton, who has visited Sasassa Valley to retrieve a stray cow. Dick tells them that Sasassa Valley is rumoured to be haunted by a "frightful fiend", and that visitors who see its eyes glowing are said to have their "after-life blighted by the malignant power of this creature". While searching for the cow, Dick saw a "strange, lurid glare, flickering and oscillating" on the cliffside. Tom is inexplicably excited by the story, and asks Dick not to share it with anyone else for the next week.

During the night, Tom fashions a "cross-stick". The following night, he convinces Jack to set off for Sasassa Valley, which is around 10 miles away from their cabin, on the way to Kaffirland. Reaching the valley, the two men move along the valley until they see a red glow at the base of the cliff; the glow is only visible from a specific angle, and cannot be seen in the daylight. Using Tom's cross-stick, the two men ascertain the exact location of the glowing object. Searching the cliffside, they find "a roughish, brownish mass about the size of a man's closed fist, and looking like a bit of dirty glass let into the wall of the cliff", which Tom identifies as a diamond.

The two men remove the diamond using a protruding knob as a fulcrum and set off home, with plans to sell the diamond in Cape Town or London. They visit their friend Madison to seek advice; Madison identifies the "diamond" as being worthless rock salt. Tom is initially crestfallen, but later insists on returning to Sasassa Valley, surmising that, as rock salt does not glow, they have removed the wrong object. Reaching the cliffside once again, they find the knob that was used as a fulcrum; projecting from the knob is "something like a glass eye; but [with] a depth and brilliancy about it such as glass never exhibited".

Thanks to the diamond, Jack and Tom become prosperous, and set Dick Wharton up in business, with Jack now the owner of "Sasassa Farm".
