= A Duet, with an Occasional Chorus =

1899 novel by Arthur Conan Doyle

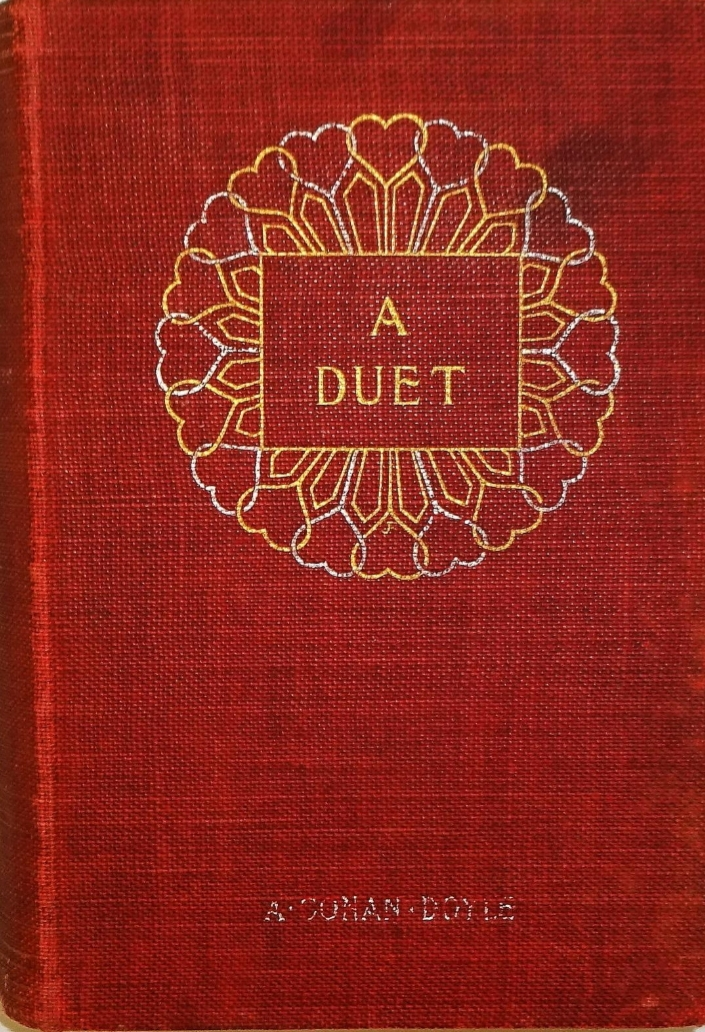
First US edition

A Duet, with an Occasional Chorus is a novel by British author Sir Arthur Conan Doyle, published in 1899 by Grant Richards in the UK and D. Appleton in the US. The novel features the story of a happily married couple which is threatened by a previous lover of the husband. Conan Doyle hoped that this would be his most successful novel to date, but the novel was widely panned for being banal and inane.
