= Brigadier Gerard =

Character by Arthur Conan Doyle

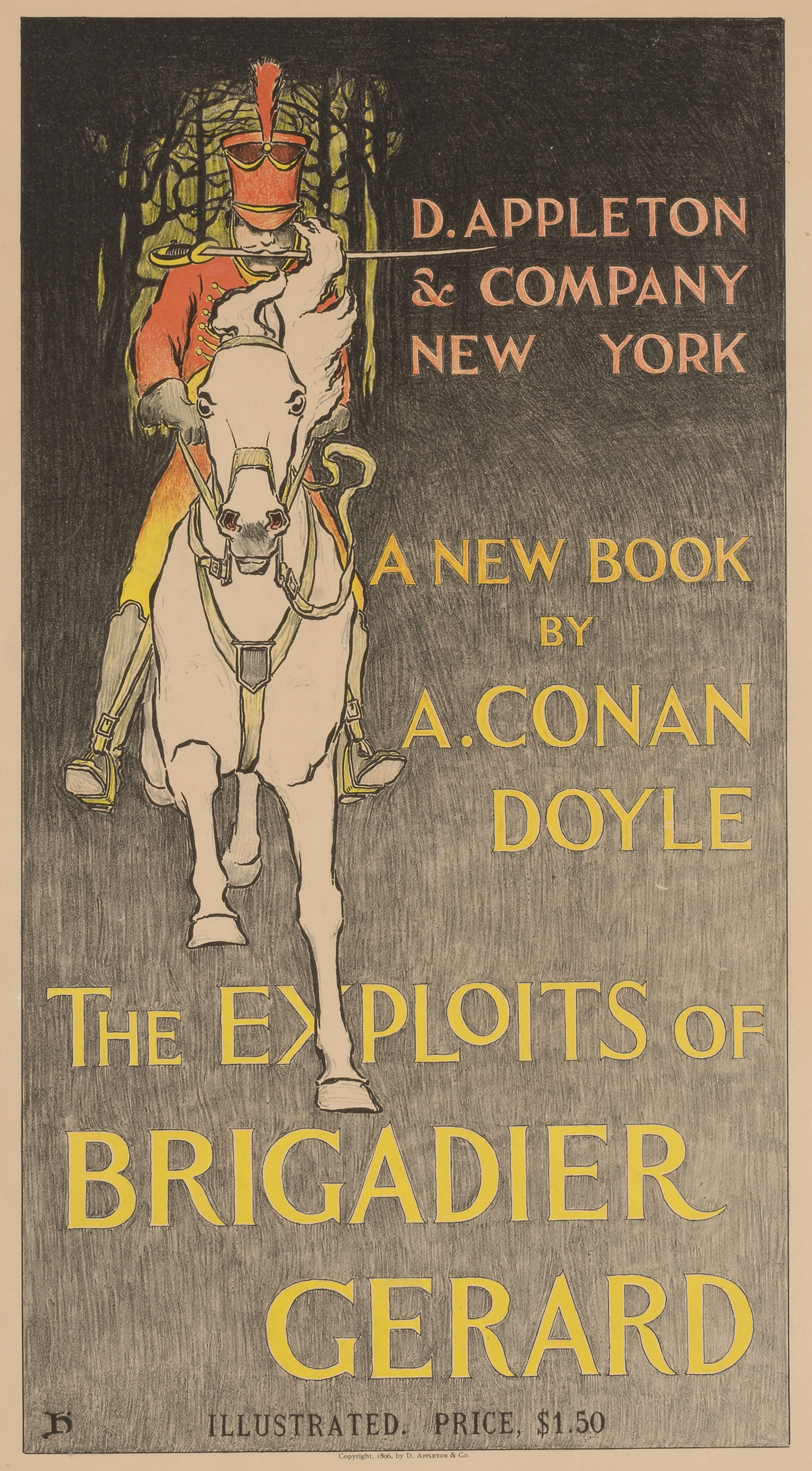
- Poster for the original book.
- First appearance: "How the Brigadier Won His Medal"
- Created by: Arthur Conan Doyle

In-universe information
- Full name: Etienne Gerard
- Gender: Male
- Occupation: Soldier
- Nationality: French

Brigadier Gerard is the hero of a series of 17 historical short stories, a play, and a major character in a novel by the British writer Arthur Conan Doyle. Brigadier Etienne Gerard is a Hussar officer in the French Army during the Napoleonic Wars. Gerard's most notable attribute is his vanity – he is utterly convinced that he is the bravest soldier, greatest swordsman, most accomplished horseman and most gallant lover in all France. Gerard is somewhat virtuous, since he displays notable bravery on many occasions, but his self-satisfaction undercuts this quite often. Obsessed with honour and glory, he is always ready with a stirring speech or a gallant remark to a lady.

== Biography ==
Gerard tells the stories from the point of view of an old man now living in retirement in Paris. We discover that he was born in Gascony in the early 1780s (he is 25 in "How the Brigadier Captured Saragossa"). In "How the Brigadier Slew the Brothers of Ajaccio", he states that he is 'in my sixtieth year', indicating that he is narrating the story in the early 1840s. In "How the Brigadier Rode to Minsk" he attends a review of troops about to depart for the Crimea (1854–1855), and this is the last identifiable date in his life, although "The Last Adventure of the Brigadier" and "The Marriage of the Brigadier" have still later settings: in the former Gerard is about to return to his Gascon homeland, and in the latter he apparently has returned there, since he states that he lives in a cottage by the Garonne. We learn in the introduction to "How the Brigadier Slew the Fox" that Gerard died of old age, but no further details are provided.

Gerard first joins the 2nd Hussars – the Hussars of Chamborant (now the Second Hussars based in Haguenau, Alsace) – around 1799, serving as a lieutenant and junior captain. He first sees action at Marengo in Italy in 1800. He transfers to the 3rd Hussars of Conflans in 1807 as a senior captain. There are, however, some discrepancies regarding which regiments Gerard is supposed to have served in: in "How the Brigadier Came to the Castle of Gloom" and "How the Brigadier Slew the Brothers of Ajaccio", he is serving in the 10th Hussars in 1807; in Uncle Bernac, he is in the 1st Hussars in 1805; and in "The Marriage of the Brigadier" he is already in the 3rd Hussars in 1802. Gerard speaks somewhat idiosyncratic English, having learned it from an officer of the Irish Brigade of the French Army. By 1810 he is colonel of the 3rd Hussars. He serves in Spain, Portugal, Italy, Germany and Russia. He is awarded the Grand-Cross of the Légion d'honneur by Napoleon in 1814. There are various discrepancies in the accounts of his life, not the least that in none of the stories except the last is he married.

Conan Doyle modelled the character of Gerard on a number of real-life sources from the Napoleonic era, writing in his author's preface that "readers of Marbot, de Gonneville, Coignet, de Fenezac, Bourgogne (fr), and the other French soldiers who have recorded their reminiscences of the Napoleonic campaigns will recognise the fountain from which I have drawn the adventures of Etienne Gerard." Conan Doyle enthusiasts have noted that although Gerard is a fictional character, he may have been inspired in particular by the real-life Baron Marcellin de Marbot (1782–1854), a noted French light cavalry officer during the Napoleonic Wars. Marbot's memoirs depicting the Napoleonic age of warfare had become very popular prior to the publication of Doyle's series about Brigadier Gerard and were praised by Doyle as being the best soldier's book known to him.

The fictional Gerard is not to be confused with the real Napoleonic officer Étienne Maurice Gérard (1777–1852), who rose to become a Marshal and later Prime Minister of France. In "How the Brigadier Was Tempted by the Devil", Gerard refers to the real Étienne Gérard as his cousin.

== Stories ==
The stories were originally published in the Strand Magazine between December 1894 and September 1903. They were later issued in two volumes: The Exploits of Brigadier Gerard in February 1896 and The Adventures of Gerard in September 1903. Some of the titles were changed on re-publication. The last story, "The Marriage of the Brigadier", was published in September 1910. All the stories were published in The Complete Brigadier Gerard in 1995, which includes the story "A Foreign Office Romance" (1894) – a precursor to the stories, but not actually featuring Gerard.

George McDonald Fraser cited Brigadier Gerard as a major inspiration for his own fictional comedic adventurer Harry Flashman, and wrote the introduction to a 2001 collection of Gerard stories. Although rare, the Brigadier Gerard stories are still in print. Twin Engine Publishing HB, Barnes & Noble Books, Echo Library and New York Review Books are some contemporary publishers. In May 2008, Penguin Classics published the complete short stories as The Exploits and Adventures of Brigadier Gerard as part of their Read Red series.

=== The Exploits of Brigadier Gerard ===
Title	Published	Notes
How the Brigadier Won His Medal ("The Medal of Brigadier Gerard")	December 1894	France, March 1814. Gerard is sent by Napoleon with an important message, via enemy territory, and only narrowly avoids capture by marauding Russian and Prussian troops.
How the Brigadier Held the King	April 1895	Spain, July 1810. Gerard is captured by Spanish partisans but is saved from certain death by British dragoons.
How the King Held the Brigadier	May 1895	England, August 1810. Gerard mounts an escape from Dartmoor Prison and is initiated in the mysteries of pugilism.
How the Brigadier Slew the Brothers of Ajaccio	June 1895	Paris, late 1807. Gerard assists Napoleon in a vendetta.
How the Brigadier Came to the Castle of Gloom	July 1895	Poland, February 1807. While on a mission to procure horses, Gerard becomes involved in an affair of honour.
How the Brigadier Took the Field Against the Marshal Millefleurs	August 1895	Portugal, March 1811. Gerard finds himself temporarily allied with the English against a notorious brigand.
How the Brigadier Was Tempted by the Devil	September 1895	Paris, April 1814. Gerard and Napoleon carry out a secret mission.
How the Brigadier Played for a Kingdom	December 1895	Germany, March 1813. Gerard encounters German nationalists and a deceitful woman.

=== The Adventures of Gerard ===
Title	Published	Notes
How the Brigadier Slew the Fox ("The Crime of the Brigadier")	January 1900	Portugal, December 1810. While on a reconnaissance behind British lines, Gerard inadvertently joins a fox-hunt with unpardonable results.
How Brigadier Gerard Lost His Ear	August 1902	Venice, c.1805. Gerard gets involved with a lovely lady and some murderous Italians.
"How the Brigadier Saved the Army"	November 1902	Portugal, March 1811. Gerard has an unpleasant encounter with Portuguese partisans.
How the Brigadier Rode to Minsk	December 1902	Russia, November 1812. On the retreat from Moscow, Gerard is sent to collect food from a depot. A lovely woman and a murderous Cossack intervene.
How the Brigadier Bore Himself at Waterloo ("The Brigadier at Waterloo")
I. "The Adventure of the Forest Inn"	January 1903	Belgium, 18 June 1815. While delivering an important message, Gerard finds himself trapped in enemy territory.
II. "The Prussian Horsemen"	February 1903	Belgium, 18 June 1815. On the retreat from Waterloo, Gerard decoys the enemy, allowing Bonaparte to escape.
"How the Brigadier Triumphed in England" ("The Brigadier in England")	March 1903	England, October 1810. Gerard shows the English how to box and fight a duel.
"How the Brigadier Captured Saragossa" ("How the Brigadier Joined the Hussars of Conflans")	April 1903	Spain, 1809. Gerard infiltrates a besieged town to carry out a dangerous mission.
"The Last Adventure of the Brigadier" ("How Etienne Gerard Said Goodbye to His Master")	May 1903	May 1821. Gerard takes a sea-voyage and plays a major role in a plan to rescue Napoleon from St. Helena. In a brief preface the elderly Brigadier farewells his drinking companions in Paris as he prepares to depart for Gascony where he was born.

=== Other stories ===
Title	Published	Notes
"A Foreign Office Romance"	November 1894	England, October 1801. A resourceful French agent ensures that the Treaty of Amiens is signed on favourable terms. (This is not a Gerard story but clearly prefigures the series in structure, character, and theme.)
"The Marriage of the Brigadier"	September 1910	France, 1802. Gerard has an unfortunate encounter with a fierce bull, which results in a proposal of marriage. (This story was written too late to be included in the first two collections but is included in The Complete Brigadier Gerard.)
Uncle Bernac	1897	France, 1805. Gerard appears as a major supporting character in this short novel, which is narrated by Louis de Laval, a young aristocrat who fled France with his parents during the French Revolution but who returns at the invitation of his uncle (the eponymous Uncle Bernac) to enter the service of Napoleon. Gerard, de Laval, Bernac and Bernac's daughter Sibylle become involved in defeating a conspiracy to assassinate Napoleon, but much of the novel consists of a series of scenes illustrating life at Napoleon's court and barely related to the plot. De Laval states at the end that Gerard married Sibylle many years after the events described in the novel, but this is not referred to in other stories. Uncle Bernac does not appear in The Complete Brigadier Gerard.
The Adventures of Brigadier Gerard' (play)	1906	March 1814. The play is not included in The Complete Brigadier Gerard.

== Chronology ==
1. "A Foreign Office Romance" (Unnamed) (October 1801)
2. "The Marriage of the Brigadier" (1802)
3. Uncle Bernac: A Memory of the Empire (Novel, major supporting character) (1805)
4. "How Brigadier Gerard Lost His Ear" (c. 1805)
5. "How the Brigadier Came to the Castle of Gloom" (February 1807)
6. "How the Brigadier Slew the Brothers of Ajaccio" (Late 1807)
7. "How the Brigadier Captured Saragossa" ("How the Brigadier Joined the Hussars of Conflans") (1809)
8. "How the Brigadier Held the King" (July 1810)
9. "How the King Held the Brigadier" (August 1810)
10. "How the Brigadier Triumphed in England" (October 1810)
11. "How the Brigadier Slew the Fox" ("The Crime of the Brigadier") (December 1810)
12. "How the Brigadier Took the Field Against the Marshal Millefleurs" (March 1811)
13. "How the Brigadier Saved the Army" (March 1811)
14. "How the Brigadier Rode to Minsk" (November 1812)
15. "How the Brigadier Played for a Kingdom" (March 1813)
16. "How the Brigadier Won His Medal" ("The Medal of Brigadier Gerard") (March 1814)
17. The Adventures of Brigadier Gerard (Play) (March 1814)
18. "How the Brigadier Was Tempted by the Devil" (April 1814)
19. "How the Brigadier Bore Himself at Waterloo" ("The Brigadier at Waterloo") (18 June 1815)
20. "The Last Adventure of the Brigadier" ("How Etienne Gerard Said Goodbye to His Master") (May 1821)

== Adaptations ==
In 1915 a silent film Brigadier Gerard was made, directed by Bert Haldane with Lewis Waller in the title role.

The French film Un drame sous Napoléon (1921), directed by Gérard Bourgeois, was a film version of the short novel Uncle Bernac.

A 1927 film with Rod La Rocque as Gerard had the title The Fighting Eagle.

Eight radio plays adapted from the stories aired on BBC radio in 1954. James McKechnie played Gerard.

In 1954, How the Brigadier Won His Medals was adapted for the Schlitz Playhouse of Stars with Claude Dauphin as Gerard.

In 1970 The Adventures of Gerard was directed by Jerzy Skolimowski with Peter McEnery playing Gerard.

Simon Russell Beale read a five-part adaptation on BBC Radio 4 in July 2000.
