= London Society =

British magazine from the Victorian era

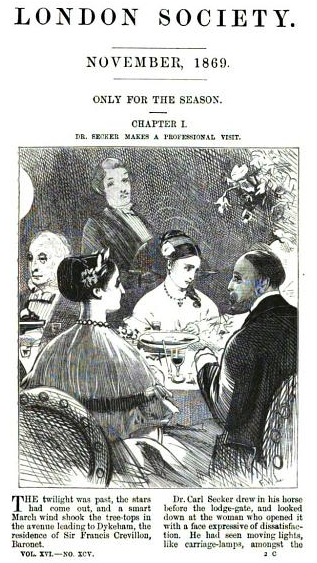
London Society 1869

London Society was a Victorian era illustrated monthly periodical, subtitled "an illustrated magazine of light and amusing literature for the hours of relaxation". It was published between 1862 and 1898 by W. Clowes and Sons, London, England. The magazine published miscellaneous articles, short fiction (mostly anonymous), and serialized novels. The Stanford Companion to Victorian Fiction called it "an inferior imitator of Smith's Cornhill".

Literary contributors included Charlotte Riddell, whose novels Above Suspicion (1874) and The Senior Partner (1881-2) were serialized; Florence Marryat (Open Sesame); and a pre-Sherlock Holmes Arthur Conan Doyle. Illustrators included Mary Ellen Edwards, Randolph Caldecott, Harry Furniss, F. A. Fraser, and George Cruikshank.
