= The Maracot Deep =

1929 short novel by Arthur Conan Doyle

- First edition (UK)
- Author: Arthur Conan Doyle
- Language: English
- Genre: Fantasy-science fiction novel
- Publisher: John Murray (UK); Doubleday Doran (US)
- Publication date: 1929
- Publication place: United Kingdom
- Media type: Print (Hardback)
- Pages: 310 pp
- Text: The Maracot Deep online

The Maracot Deep is a short 1929 novel by Arthur Conan Doyle about the discovery of a sunken city of Atlantis by a team of explorers led by Professor Maracot. He is accompanied by Cyrus Headley, a young research zoologist and Bill Scanlan, an expert mechanic working with an iron works in Philadelphia who is in charge of the construction of the submersible which the team takes to the bottom of the Atlantic.

The novel first appeared in October 1927 as a serial in The Saturday Evening Post. It also appeared as a serial in The Strand Magazine from October 1927 to February 1928. In 1929, it was followed by a sequel, The Lord of the Dark Face, beginning with the April issue of The Strand. The same year, the novel was published in The Maracot Deep and Other Stories from John Murray in London, and was released in the U.S. by Doubleday Books of New York.

== Plot ==
The novel revolves around the legend of Atlantis, mentioned as an ancient city or continent which was drowned by the sea due to divine intervention. The novel is narrated by Headley, who first writes a letter to his friend Sir James Talbot. On his subsequent rescue, he completes his story, giving details on his escape and how they fought off possibly the greatest danger to humanity, the Devil himself.

The novel begins with preparations for the dive, off the coast of Africa. Prof. Maracot claims to have located the deepest trench in the Atlantic and is vehement that he shall go down in the specially prepared submersible (actually a bathysphere) along with Headley and Scanlan. On reaching the edge of the trench, a description of the undersea world is presented. The team comes face to face with a giant crustacean who cuts off their line and hurls them down into the trench. Down in the trench, the team is rescued by the Atlanteans who are the last survivors of the land that was Atlantis.

At this point, one device in particular is often made use of: a thought projector, which visualizes the thoughts of a person for others to see. This helps the team and the Atlanteans to communicate.

Descriptions of work habits, culture and various sea creatures are provided. The Atlanteans forage for their food from the sea bed and their slaves, Greek descendants of Atlantis's original slaves, work in undersea mines. This is made possible thanks to an exceptionally strong and light transparent material Atlanteans fashion into helmets to enable people to work underwater.

The team eventually uses the levity of these spheres to escape to the surface. Headley elopes with the daughter of Manda, leader of the Atlanteans.

In the later part of the novel, Headley describes the encounter with the Lord of the Dark Face, a supernatural being who led the Atlanteans to their doom and was the cause of untold miseries to humanity ever since. This being is likened to the Phoenician god Baal, who was demonized by later religions and cultures. The being is defeated by Prof. Maracot who becomes possessed by the spirit of Warda, the man who managed to convince a handful of Atlanteans to prepare for the worst and thus built an Ark which saved them from the cataclysm which destroyed their land.

== See also ==
- List of underwater science fiction works
- The City in the Sea, a poem by Edgar Allan Poe
