= Beyond the City =

1892 novel by Arthur Conan Doyle

- Author: Sir Arthur Conan Doyle
- Publication date: 1892

Beyond the City: The Idyl of a Suburb is an 1892 novel by the Scottish author Sir Arthur Conan Doyle.

The novel is set in a quiet commuter district outside London and follows the lives and relationships of several neighbouring families. Themes include social change, the contrast between traditional values and modern attitudes, and the evolving roles of women in Victorian society, explored through the interactions of characters such as the outspoken Mrs. Westmacott and the retired Admiral Hay Denver.

The story centers on the everyday lives of three suburban families — the Denvers, the Walkers and the Westmacotts — as they confront personal and financial difficulties and adjust to social changes within their community. Mrs. Westmacott’s unconventional ideas and assertive personality challenge traditional attitudes, leading to evolving relationships and mutual support among the neighbours.
