= Micah Clarke =

1889 novel by Arthur Conan Doyle

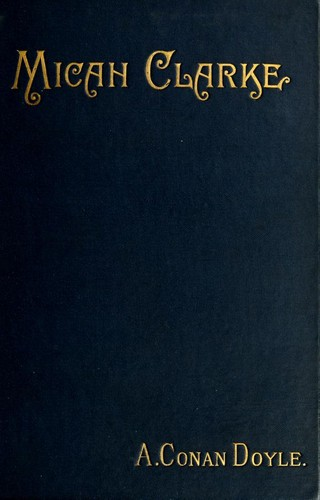
- First edition
- Author: Arthur Conan Doyle
- Genre: Historical novel
- Publisher: Longmans, Green & Co.
- Publication date: 1889
- Publication place: United Kingdom
- Media type: Print (hardback)
- Pages: vi, 424 pp
- Preceded by: A Study in Scarlet
- Followed by: The Mystery of Cloomber
- Text: Micah Clarke at Wikisource

Micah Clarke is a historical adventure novel by British author Arthur Conan Doyle, published in 1889 and set during the Monmouth Rebellion of 1685 in England. The book is a bildungsroman whose protagonist, Micah Clarke, begins as a boy seeking adventure in a rather romantic and naive way, falls under the influence of an older and vastly experienced, world-weary soldier of fortune, and becomes a grown up after numerous experiences, some of them very harrowing. At the conclusion he must go into exile as a hunted outlaw, becomes a soldier of fortune himself and is launched on a lifetime military career. In the process the book also records much of the history of the Monmouth Rebellion, from the point of view of someone living in 17th century England.

Much of the focus is upon the religious dimension of the conflict. The Rebellion was prompted by the desire of many to replace the Catholic King James with a Protestant rival. Micah is the son of a committed Protestant father who sends Micah to fight in the same cause that he himself had fought in during the English Civil War. Micah fights at the Battle of Sedgemoor, which in a narrative aside Doyle obliquely acknowledges to be the last clear-cut pitched battle on open ground between two military forces fought on English soil. Micah also witnesses the bloodletting and indiscriminate hangings in the aftermath, is prosecuted along with many others in the Bloody Assizes of the notorious Judge Jeffreys, is condemned to be sold to slavery in Barbados and is at the last moment saved from the very hold of the slave ship.

Much is made of the role of Protestant ministers in recruiting the rebel army and in motivating its soldiers. Micah Clarke himself becomes increasingly disillusioned with religious extremism and ultimately expresses the view that toleration is a great good. Conan Doyle had himself been brought up as a Catholic and it is likely that Micah expresses Doyle's own thoughts on the subject.

== Main characters ==
- Micah Clarke
- Reuben Lockarby
- Decimus Saxon
- Sir Gervas Jerome

== Historical figures who appear in the novel ==
- Archibald Campbell
- John Churchill
- James II
- James Scott
- Judge Jeffreys
- Lord Grey of Warke
- Robert Ferguson

== Adaptations ==
A radio play adaptation by John Holloway was broadcast on BBC Radio on 15 July 1937.

A seven-part adaptation by John Hale was broadcast on the BBC Home Service 16 March - 27 April 1966. The cast included Brian Jackson as Micah Clarke, Patrick Troughton as Decimus Saxon and David Jackson as Reuben Lockarby.

BBC Radio 4 broadcast a five-part adaptation by Constance Cox and directed by David Johnstone 31 March - 3 May 1985. The cast included Martyn Read as Micah Clarke, Patrick Troughton as Decimus Saxon, James Bryce as Reuben Lockarby and Nicholas Courtney as Joseph Clarke.

== Conan Doyle and Oscar Wilde ==
In 1889, shortly after the publication of Micah Clarke, Conan Doyle and Oscar Wilde were both invited for a dinner party in London with Joseph Marshall Stoddart of the American Lippincott's Monthly Magazine. As a result of the dinner, both authors agreed to write novels to be published by Lippincott's. Conan Doyle's novel was his second Sherlock Holmes novel, The Sign of the Four (1890). Wilde's was The Picture of Dorian Gray (1891). During the dinner party the two authors chatted, and Wilde disclosed that he had read Micah Clarke and liked it.

Conan Doyle mentioned the incident in his 1924 autobiography, Memories and Adventures. He explained that he and Wilde became friendly, but that the friendship remained a distant one at best, and that it grew more distant as Wilde's reputation became questionable. The actual friendly relationship appears to be true, but that Wilde liked Micah Clarke remains at issue. In the 1999 biography of Conan Doyle, Teller of Tales, author Daniel Stashower suspects that Wilde would never have liked such a novel. But Conan Doyle claimed in his autobiography that what Wilde liked was the characterization of Judge George Jeffreys in the novel. Jeffreys, the notorious bully of the law courts of his day, was shown as a handsome, brilliant man with a flaw in his character – a fallen angel type, such as figured in some of Wilde's writing.

(...)It hath ever been the custom, since his [Jeffreys'] wickedness hath come to be known to all men, to picture him as a man whose expression and features were as monstrous and as hideous as was the mind behind them. This is by no means the case. On the contrary, he was a man who, in his younger days, must have been remarkable for his extreme beauty. He was not, it is true, very old, as years go, when I saw him, but debauchery and low living had left their traces upon his countenance, without, however entirely destroying the regularity and the beauty of his features. He was dark, more like a Spaniard than an Englishman, with black eyes and olive complexion. His expression was lofty and noble, but his temper was so easily aflame that the slightest cross or annoyance would set him raving like a madman, with blazing eyes and foaming mouth. I have seen him myself with the froth upon his lips and his whole face twitching with passion, like one who hath the falling sickness. Yet his other emotions were under as little control, for I have heard say that a very little would cause him to sob and to weep, more especially when he had himself been slighted by those who were above him. He was, I believe, a man who had great powers either for good or for evil, but by pandering to the darker side of his nature and neglecting the other, he brought himself to be as near a fiend as it is possible for a man to be.

Claire Deftstone remarked that "Whether or not Doyle's characterization fits with the kind of the person that the historical Judge Jeffreys really was, it is not completely implausible that it had some influence or bearing on how Wilde shaped the main character of 'Dorian Grey'".
