= The Stark Munro Letters =

1895 novel by Arthur Conan Doyle

- First edition
- Author: Arthur Conan Doyle
- Language: English
- Publisher: Longmans, Green & Co., London
- Publication date: 1895
- Publication place: United Kingdom
- Media type: Print (Hardback)

The Stark Munro Letters is a novel by British author Sir Arthur Conan Doyle first published in 1895 by Longmans, Green & Co. in London, England.

== Background ==
The book is heavily autobiographical, depicting Conan Doyle's relationship with his parents and his emerging interest in spirituality. It incorporates material he wrote early in 1891 on his rejection of Catholicism in favour of spiritualism. The book was rewritten and collated at the Swiss health spa of Davos, where his wife was recuperating from an illness. This was shortly after he had published "The Final Problem", the story in which he killed off Sherlock Holmes; in writing The Stark Munro Letters he was attempting to expand his career in a more literary direction. In a letter to his mother dated 23 January 1894, he wrote that "It will make a religious sensation if not a literary - possibly both. I really don't think a young man's life has been gone into so deeply in English literature before."

== Synopsis ==
As an epistolary novel it takes the form of twelve long letters written by J. Stark Munro between March 1881 and November 1884 and sent to his friend Herbert Swanborough of Lowell, Massachusetts. Stark Munro is a recent graduate from medical school, and the letters, in part, detail his attempts to create a medical practice in partnership with the brilliant but unorthodox James Cullingworth—a narrative based on Doyle's experiences in Plymouth with Doctor George Turnavine Budd (medical doctor), before he set up his own practice in Southsea, Portsmouth in 1882.

== Mention in James Joyce's Ulysses ==
The Stark-Munro Letters by A. Conan Doyle is mentioned in the "Ithaca" chapter of Ulysses.
