= The Refugees (novel) =

1893 novel by Arthur Conan Doyle

The Refugees A Tale of Two Continents
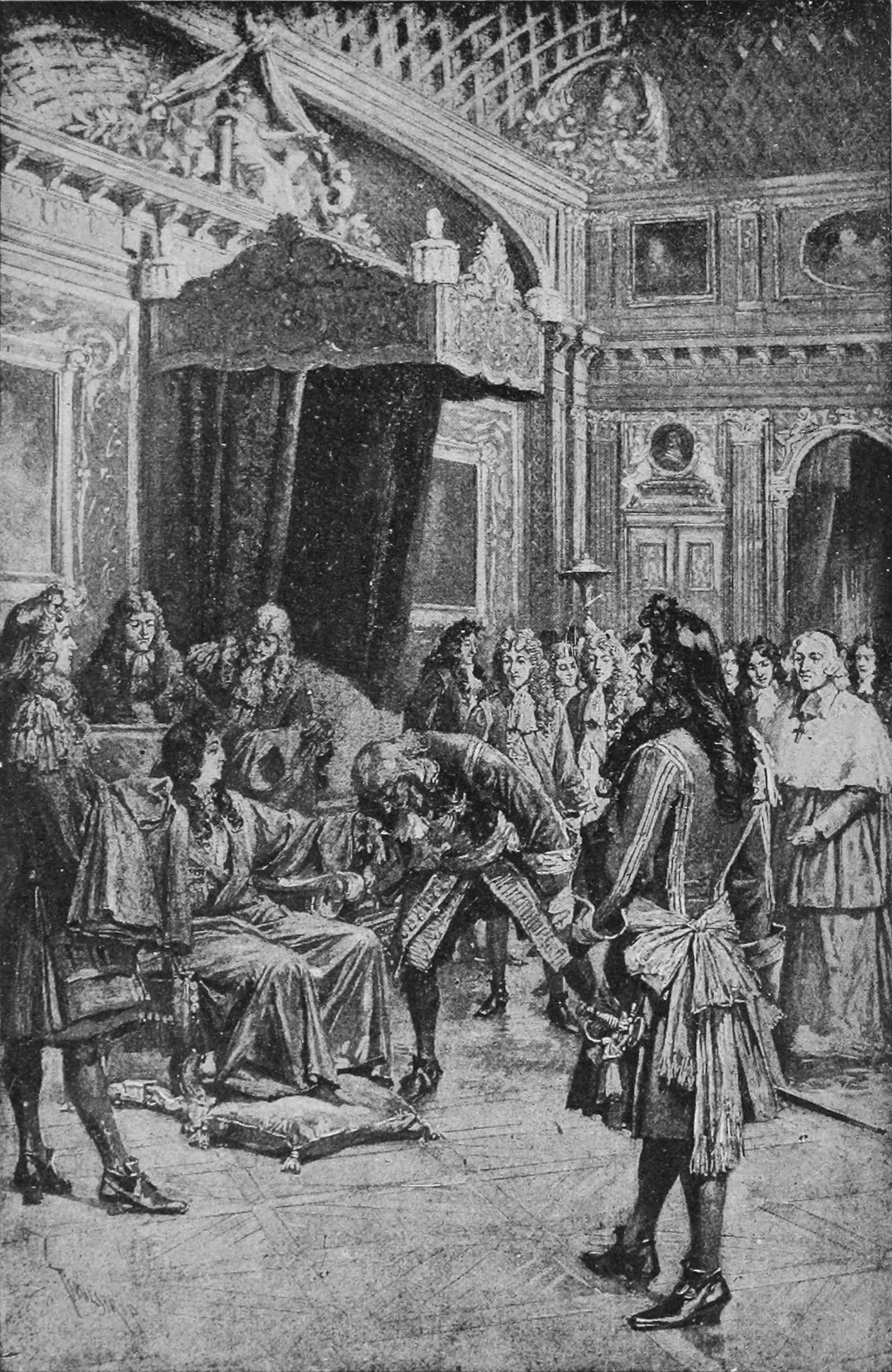
- Frontispiece: The "Grand Lever" of the King
- Author: Arthur Conan Doyle
- Illustrator: T. de Thulstrup
- Language: English
- Genre: Historical novel
- Publisher: Harper & Brothers
- Publication date: 1893
- Publication place: United Kingdom
- Media type: Print (Hardback)
- Pages: 366
- Preceded by: "Lot No. 249"
- Followed by: Jane Annie, or the Good Conduct Prize

The Refugees (1893) is a historical novel by British writer Sir Arthur Conan Doyle.

== Plot ==
It revolves around Amory de Catinat, a Huguenot guardsman of Louis XIV, and Amos Green, an American who comes to visit France. Major themes include Louis XIV's marriage to Madame de Maintenon, retirement from court of Madame de Montespan, the revoking of the Edict of Nantes (1685) and the subsequent emigration of the Huguenot de Catinats to America.
