= Josiah Pittman =

British composer (1816–1886)

Josiah Pittman (3 September 1816 – 23 April 1886) was a British organist, composer of church music, music editor, and accompanist at opera rehearsals.

== Life ==
Pittman was born on 2 September 1816, the son of a musician. He studied the organ under Goodman and S. S. Wesley. He later took lessons in the piano from Ignaz Moscheles, and in 1836 and 1837 at Frankfurt am Main he studied composition with Franz Xaver Schnyder von Wartensee. He was organist successively at the parish church of Sydenham from 1831, at Tooting from 1833, and at Spitalfields from 1835 to 1847. From 1852 to 1864 he was organist at Lincoln's Inn.

In 1865, he became accompanist at Her Majesty's Opera, and from 1868 until his death, he filled the same office at Covent Garden. The value of his musical work at the opera was best understood by those behind the scenes, while his literary abilities fitted him to assist in the translation of libretti.

For several years, he delivered the annual course of lectures on music at the London Institution.

Pittman died suddenly, in his seventieth year, on 23 April 1886.

== Publications ==
A close study of the requirements of the established church with regard to congregational singing or chanting led Pittman to the conclusion that the Book of Common Prayer was made "for song and naught else." He deplored the absence of music from the psalter as originally framed, and the consequent discouragement of the people from active participation in church services. In 1858, he set forth these views in The People in Church. This was followed in 1859 by The People in the Cathedral, mainly a historical treatise.

He composed many services and much sacred music, some of which he published in 1859.

He edited the series of operas in piano score published as The Royal Edition by Messrs. Boosey, ranging from Auber through the alphabet to Weber, and in co-operation with Arthur Sullivan, he selected the operatic songs for the popular Royal Edition albums issued by the same publishers.

Pittman also edited a volume of Bach's Fugues, and the musical portions of theoretical works by Cherubini, Marx, Callcott, and others. Songs of Scotland, compiled by Colin Brown and Pittman, was published in 1873.
