= The Masque at Kenilworth =

Cantata by Arthur Sullivan and Henry Fothergill Chorley

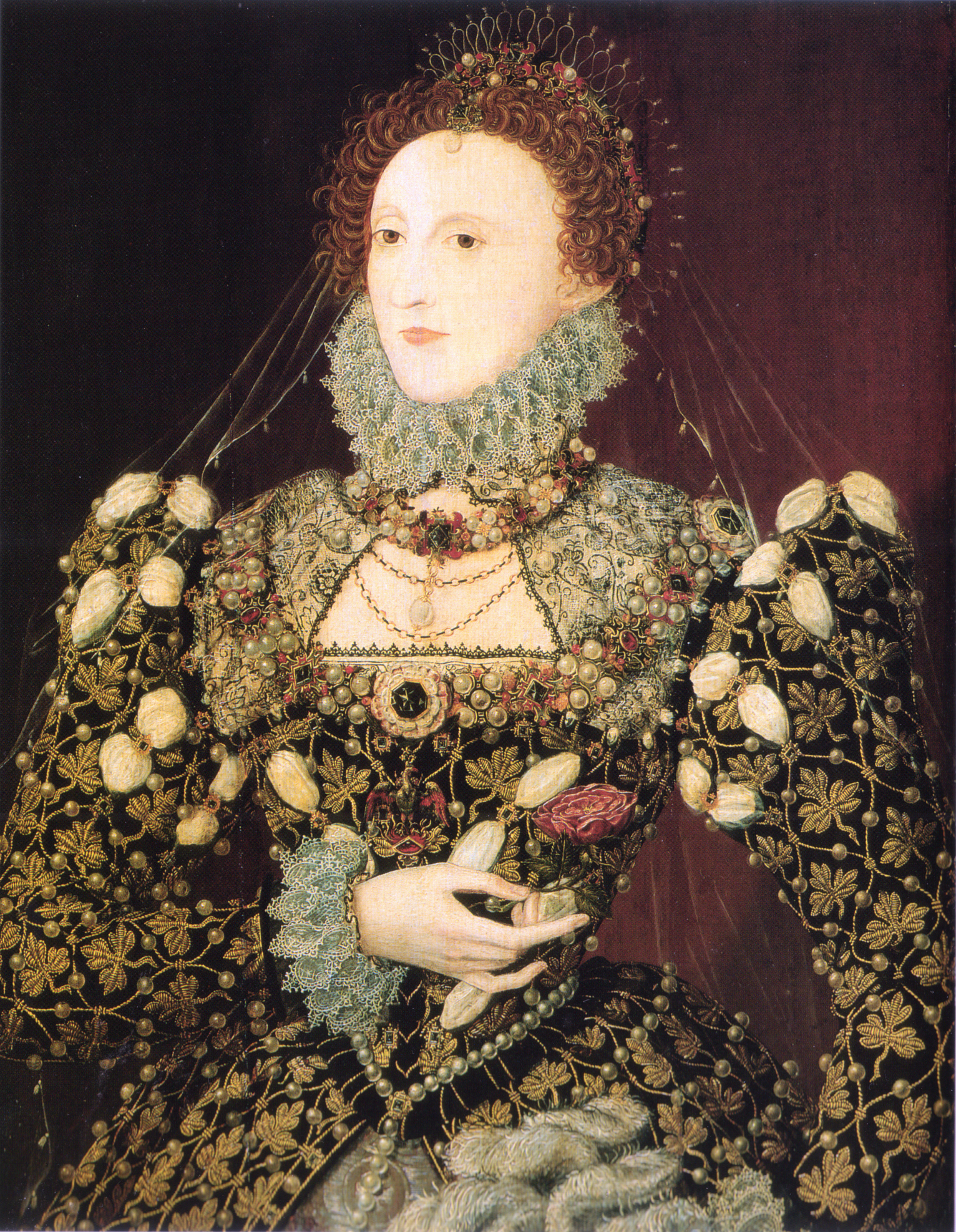
Queen Elizabeth I

Kenilworth, A Masque of the Days of Queen Elizabeth (commonly referred to as "The Masque at Kenilworth"), is a cantata with music by Arthur Sullivan and words by Henry Fothergill Chorley (with an extended Shakespeare quotation) that premiered at the Birmingham Festival on 8 September 1864.

In 1575, Queen Elizabeth visited Robert Dudley at Kenilworth Castle, where he presented her with lavish entertainments over a period of 19 days in an attempt to persuade her to marry him. This piece attempts to recreate the sort of masque that might have been performed for the queen's pleasure. The text is based partly on the description of the queen's visit in the 1821 novel Kenilworth, by Sir Walter Scott and on other contemporary accounts and fiction.

== Background ==
Kenilworth is one of Arthur Sullivan's earliest choral works, coming only three years after he completed his studies. Early in 1862, the critic Henry Fothergill Chorley, who served on the committee that had awarded the Mendelssohn Scholarship to Sullivan, had hosted a private performance of Sullivan's incidental music to Shakespeare's The Tempest at his home, where George Grove, at that time Secretary to The Crystal Palace, heard the piece. Grove was sufficiently impressed to arrange for a performance of the work at The Crystal Palace This piece was a hit and launched Sullivan's reputation.

Henry Fothergill Chorley

Sullivan and Chorley then began collaborating on songs and other works. In 1863, Sullivan and Chorley were collaborating on an opera, The Sapphire Necklace, that they had hoped would be produced by the Royal Italian Opera House at Covent Garden. Sullivan met the music director of the opera house, Sir Michael Costa, seeking to cultivate a relationship with the important conductor. He expressed his eagerness to learn all that he could about opera and asked to attend rehearsals. Costa hired Sullivan as an organist at Covent Garden.

Costa also began to send composing commissions to Sullivan. In 1864, at the recommendation of Costa, who was also chief conductor of the triennial Birmingham Musical Festival, Sullivan received a commission to write a cantata for the Festival. At the time, Sullivan and Chorley had submitted The Sapphire Necklace to the Royal Opera House, but the opera was turned down. Instead, Costa, perhaps in consolation for rejecting the opera, arranged for Chorley to write the libretto for the masque. Chorley's libretto draws on the description in the 1821 novel Kenilworth, by Sir Walter Scott, of the visit of Queen Elizabeth and her 400-member entourage to Kenilworth Castle in 1575. The libretto also draws on other contemporary accounts and fiction. Chorley noted in his preface to the libretto that his "fancy was directed" to the subject matter not only for its "local interest" (Kenilworth is near Birmingham), but because he had long enjoyed Scott's "wondrously musical, but as wondrously simple" description of Elizabeth's arrival for the masque. Chorley does not allude to it, but Michael Costa had composed a ballet on the subject of Kenilworth in 1831.

The 22-year-old Sullivan composed the piece over the summer of 1864 and travelled to Birmingham in early September for the first rehearsal. He conducted the première of the cantata on 8 September 1864, which was generally well received. However, The Times was disappointed in the young composer's missing so "golden a chance" to provide something of "more dignity" for such a grand event and dismissed the music as merely "trivial prettiness". It noted, however, that had the piece been written for a less exceptional occasion, it "would be welcomed as a very agreeable work, unambitious in plan, unpretending in style, but at the same time lively, tuneful, fresh, and extremely well-written both for voices and instruments."

After two further performances (at The Crystal Palace on 12 November 1864; and by the Dublin Philharmonic Society in 1868), Sullivan withdrew the piece and refused to allow it to be performed. There were also three known complete performances of the masque around the first anniversary of the composer's death and additional performances in 1903 and 1907. The "Shakespeare Duet" and "Brisk Dance" were performed independently, with the composer's permission, on many occasions and continued to be performed well into the 20th century.

== Description ==
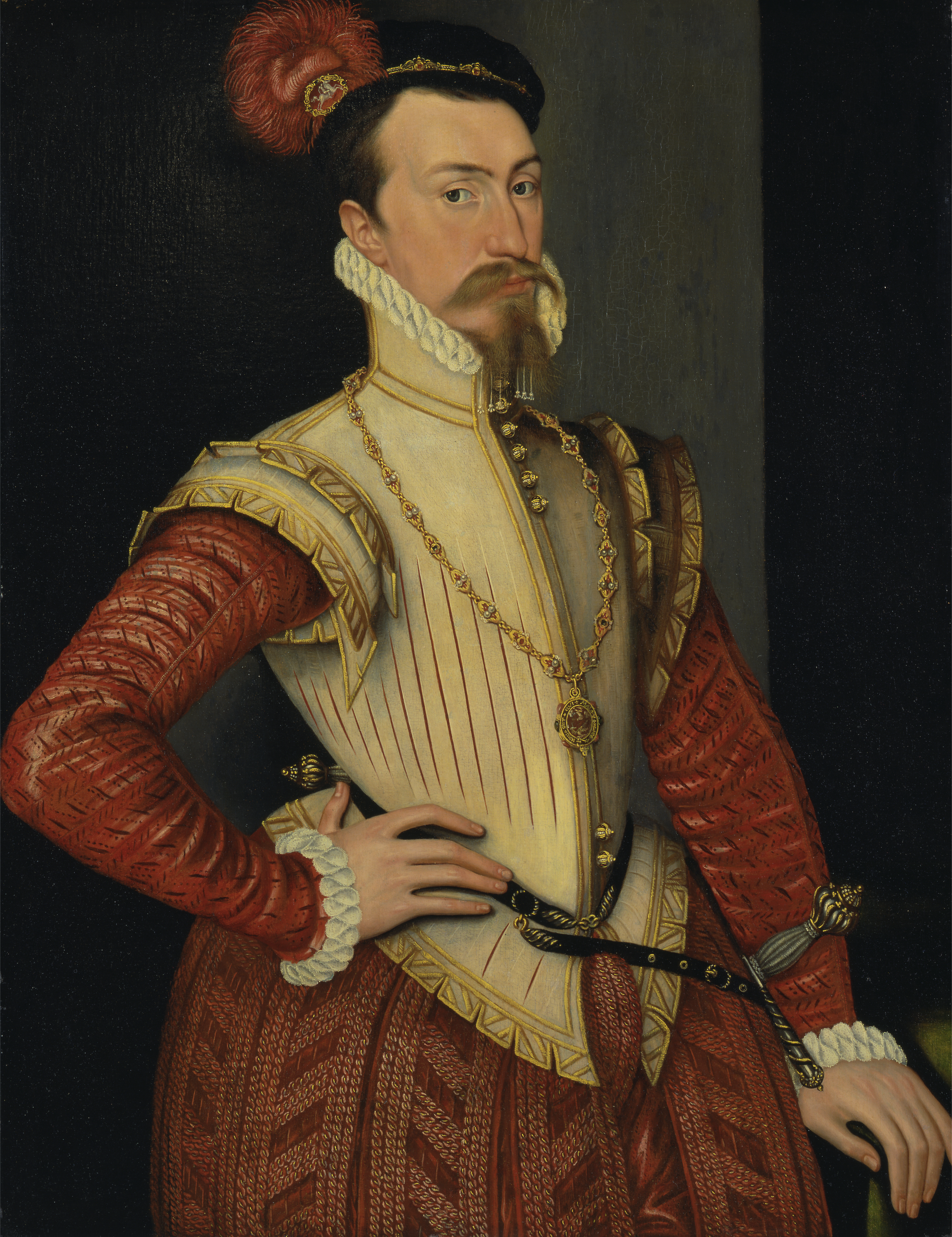
Robert Dudley, Earl of Leicester

Kenilworth is a conjectural reconstruction of a masque by the dramatist George Gascoigne that was planned to be performed for the pleasure of Queen Elizabeth on her fourth and last visit, in 1875, to Kenilworth Castle, which she had gifted in 1563 to her favourite courtier, Robert Dudley. Dudley entertained the Queen for 19 days, at a cost of £1000 per day, with entertainments, pageants, fireworks and banquets that surpassed anything ever before seen in England. "The final entertainment should have been a masque urging Elizabeth to marry her host", but when it was rained off, the queen rode away, ignoring pleas to stay.

The text of Kenilworth consists of descriptions of various mythical entities, creatures and people joyfully praising Elizabeth, singing and dancing to her after her arrival in Kenilworth on a summer's night. These include the Lady of the Lake, who rises from the water to greet her, and the ancient Greek poet Arion, who arrives astride a dolphin. A performance of the "summer night" scene from The Merchant of Venice is given, and then the Queen is sung lovingly to sleep. The Merchant of Venice scene is anachronistic, since Shakespeare was a young boy in 1575, but Chorley notes in his preface that Scott had also anachronistically used Shakespeare material. Chorley's effort was ridiculed as "trivial". In addition, Chorley faced much criticism over a misquote of The Merchant of Venice in No. 7, "Scene from The Merchant of Venice". Chorley's line reads: "Still quiring to the young-eyed cherubum, / Such harmony is in immortal sounds." Shakespeare wrote "immortal souls".

Nevertheless, the young Sullivan's effort showed promise. Its most successful movement was the duet, "How sweet the Moonlight sleeps." The soloists at the premiere were Helen Lemmens-Sherrington (soprano), Elizabeth Annie "Bessie" Palmer (contralto), Charles Santley (baritone) and William Hayman Cummings (tenor), a last-minute substitution for the ailing Mario. The Times particularly praised the performances of Lemmens-Sherrington and Santley

== Original soloists ==
- Helen Lemmens-Sherrington (soprano): Lady of the Lake, Quartet, Jessica
- Elizabeth Annie "Bessie" Palmer (contralto): Connecting recitatives, Quartet.
- William Hayman Cummings (tenor): Quartet, Lorenzo
- Charles Santley (baritone): Quartet, Arion

== List of musical numbers and descriptions ==
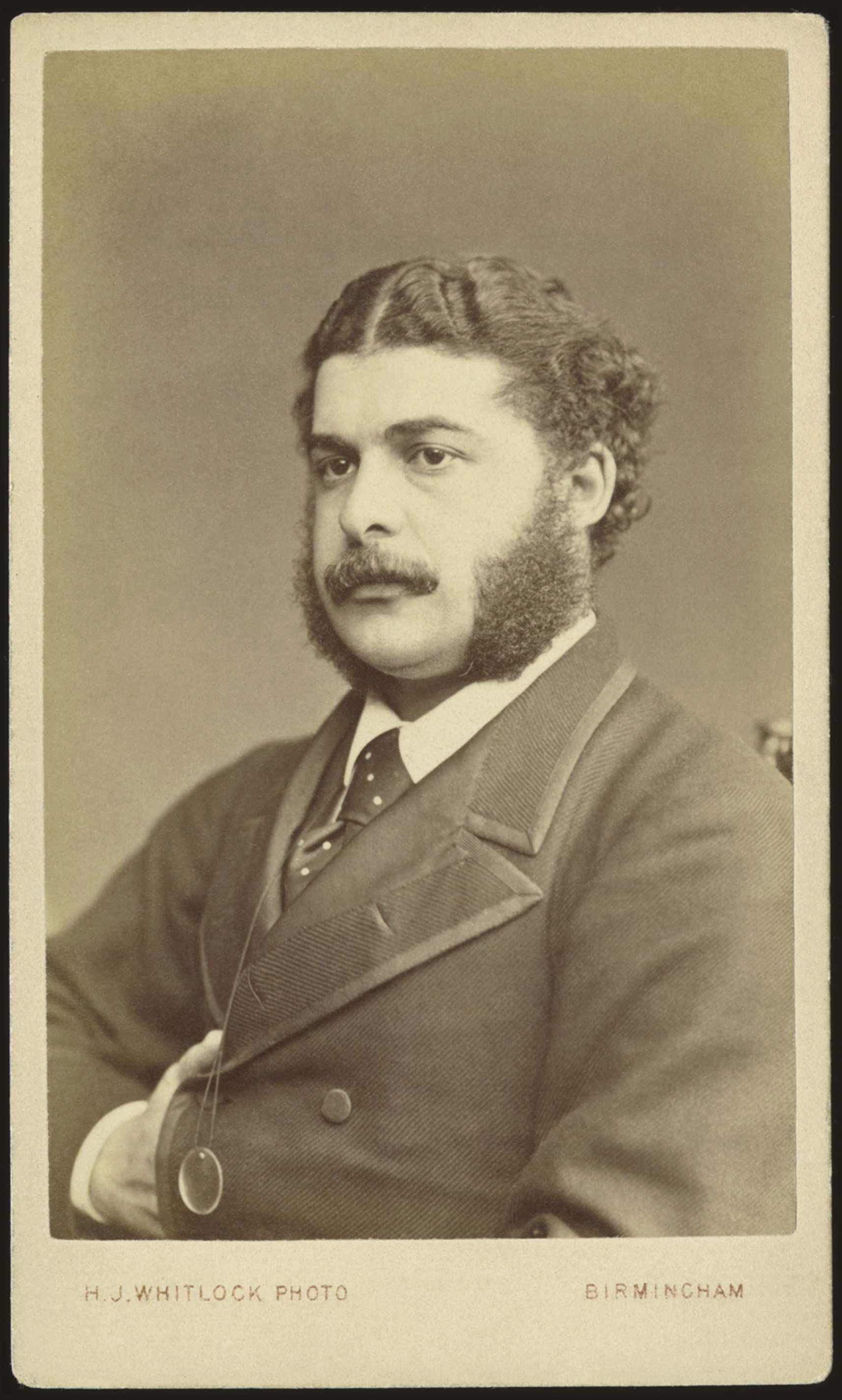
Sullivan in about 1870

1. Introduction: A Summer Night - Instrumental
2. "Hark! The Sound that Hails a King" - Contralto solo (Palmer) and chorus

A soloist hails the arrival of Queen Elizabeth. The chorus then summarizes the entertainments to come and welcomes the queen.

3. Song, "I have slept beneath the water" - The Lady of the Lake (Lemmens-Sherrington)

The Lady of the Lake describes awakening after centuries, to the merry, golden present, and rising to meet the queen.

4. "Let Fauns the cymbal ring" - Quartet (Lemmens-Sherrington, Palmer, Cummings, and Santley) and male chorus of sylvans

The Fauns, Sylvans and Dryads welcome Oriana (a nickname for Elizabeth) with music and tribute, and celebrate her bravery and beauty.

5. Slow Dance with a Burthen (Women's Chorus)
6. Song, "I am a ruler on the sea" - Arion (Santley)

The Greek poet Arion sings of Britain's mastery of the sea and praises the mariners who guard her glorious crown. He says "threatening Spain" could not touch one blade of grass in Britain, as the land itself would rise up against them.

6a. Contralto recitative: "Place for the Queen our show to see, Now speak Immortal Poetry." (Palmer)
7. Scene from The Merchant of Venice (Act V, scene i): "How sweet the moonlight sleeps" (Lemmens-Sherrington and Cummings)

Lorenzo speaks to his new bride, Jessica, comparing the moon and stars in the quiet night to harmony of their souls. He jokingly compares the soundless night to the one when Troilus committed a romantic act of daring for his lover Cressida. Jessica counters in kind, comparing the night to that on which Thisbe fled from the shadow of the lion. They agree that, on such a night, Dido stood upon the sea banks and waved for her love to return to Carthage.

8. A Brisk Dance - Instrumental
9. Contralto solo and Chorus: "After banquet, play, and riot" (Palmer)... "Sleep, great Queen!" (Chorus)

Now that the banquet and play are over, it is time for the queen to sleep. The masque is not yet ended, and the next day will bring new delights. The people bless and hail the queen in a happy, but subdued ending.

== Recordings ==
The piece has received two complete professional recordings. The first, in 1999, was on a disk called Sullivan: 'The Masque at Kenilworth' – Music for Royal and National Occasions, by the Oxford Company of Musicians and Oxford Pro Musica Singers, conducted by Michael Smedley (Symposium CD 1247). A second recording, by Victorian Opera Northwest, conducted by Richard Bonynge, was released in 2014 (Dutton Vocalion CDLX 7310). A review notes that Kenilworth and its companion piece, On Shore and Sea, "emerge in good heart under veteran Richard Bonynge's life-ebullient conviction. The singers, solo and ensemble and orchestra deliver fully satisfactory results ... and more."
