= On Shore and Sea =

Dramatic cantata composed by Arthur Sullivan

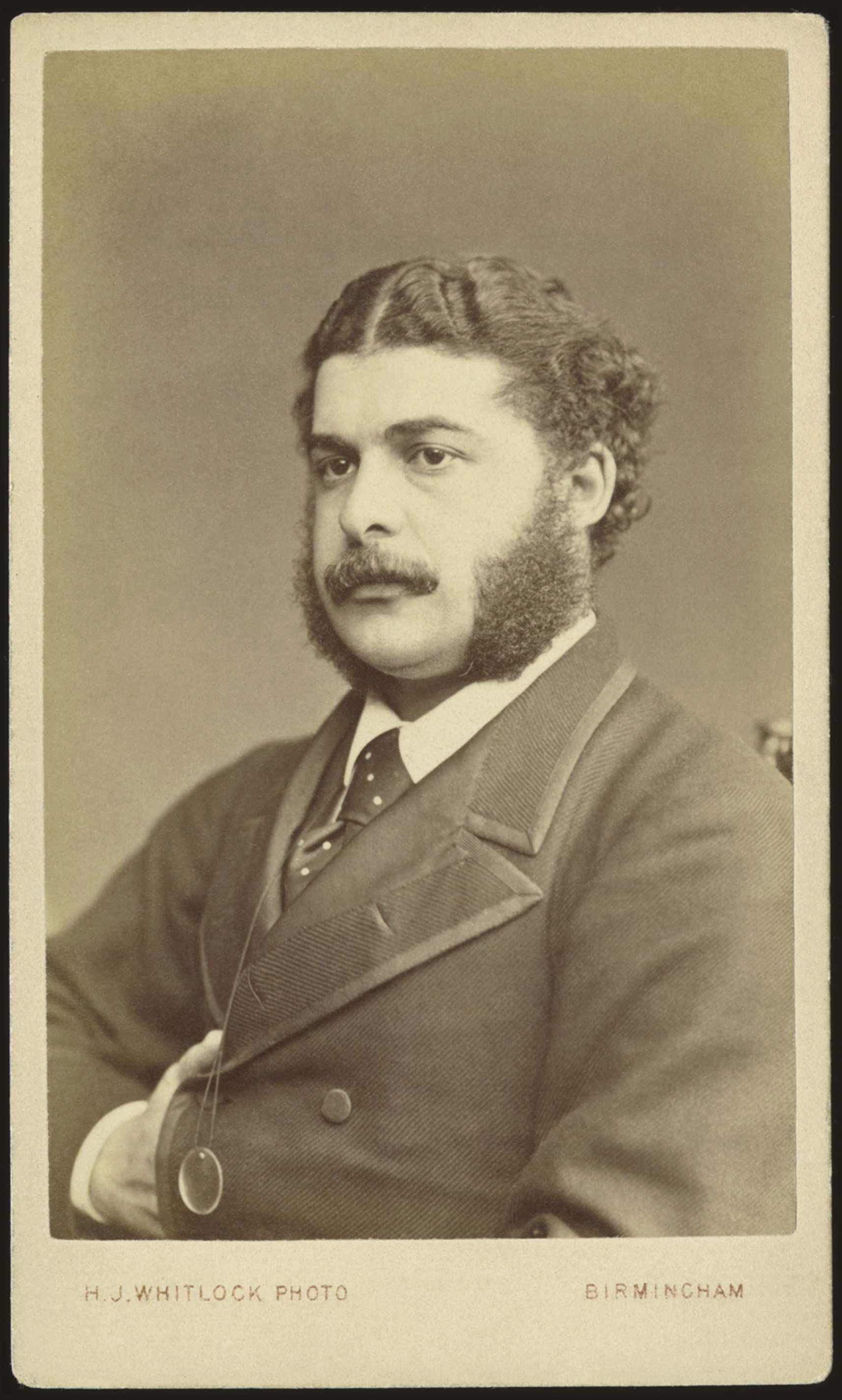
Sullivan in about 1870

On Shore and Sea is a "dramatic cantata" composed by Arthur Sullivan, with words by Tom Taylor. Sullivan completed this work to open the Royal Albert Hall, and it was performed at the opening of the London International Exhibition of art and industry on 1 May 1871. The concert featured works commissioned from Italy, France, Germany, and Great Britain. Charles Gounod was the French representative.

== Background ==
The cantata has an appropriately international flavour, telling of war and reunion, based on a 16th-century conflict between Christians and Moors at a time when conflict raged between the Saracen settlements in Northern Africa and the Christian states of the Mediterranean, especially Genoa. The theme is the sorrows and separations that are always incidental to war. The central characters are a sailor and his love, who are separated when he goes to battle, and later reunited. The final chorus, "Sink and Scatter, Clouds of War," was later renamed "The Song of Peace" and was played separately as a concert item.

The same year as On Shore and Sea premiered, W. S. Gilbert first worked together with Sullivan, on a burleque-style comic opera, Thespis. Four years later, in 1875, Gilbert and Sullivan's second work together, Trial by Jury, would also be described as "a dramatic cantata," and this was Sullivan's only work, other than On Shore and Sea to be so described.

The whereabouts of the composer's autograph score were not publicly known until Terence Rees purchased it at auction in 1966. On Shore and Sea was finally professionally recorded in 2014, by Victorian Opera Northwest, conducted by Richard Bonynge. A review of the recording notes that the cantata and a companion piece, The Masque at Kenilworth, "emerge in good heart under veteran Richard Bonynge's life-ebullient conviction. The singers, solo and ensemble and orchestra deliver fully satisfactory results ... and more."

== Synopsis ==
Near a small seaport on the Italian Riviera near 16th century Genoa, the fleet weighs anchor to the sounds of a joyous song of the sailors as they heave at the windlass and spread the sail. Their brave declaration of their determination to sweep the Saracens from the sea is contrasted with the lament of the wives and mothers, sisters and sweethearts, left sorrowing on the shore. At sea, aboard one of the galleys, in the midnight watch, the thoughts and prayers of Il Marinajo go back to the loved ones left behind and invoke for them the protection of our Lady, Star of the Sea. "What doth now the maid I love?" he wonders. "Does she sleep and dream of me? / Or prays she her aint above Shield of her sailor to be? / Sending her heart, like a dove, / Hither across the sea!" Months pass. The fleet appears on the horizon, and the crowd flocks to the port to greet its triumphant return. La Sposina faithfully awaits the return of Il Marinajo, her lover. She looks for him hopefully, but the galley aboard which her sailor served is missing: it has been taken by Moorish sea rovers. Her beloved is captive, or slain. She gives expression to her desolation, amid the sympathizing sorrow of her companions.

Her lover, however, is not slain, but a slave, toiling at the oar, under the lash of his Moorish captors. While the Moors are celebrating their triumphs with song and feasting, he obtains the key to the chain securing all the prisoners and exhorts his fellow prisoners to strike for their liberty. The galley slaves rise up against their captors bolstered by their Christian faith and their love for their wives and mothers ashore. They overwhelm their captors, master the galley and steer homewards. Re-entering the port, they are welcomed by their beloved ones. The sorrow of separation is turned to rejoicing; La Sposina and Il Marinajo will live and die in each other's arms. The cantata ends with a paean to the blessedness of Peace, inviting all nations to her temple.

== Characters ==
- La Sposina (A Riviera Woman)
- Il Marinajo (A Genoese Sailor)
- Chorus of Riviera Women
- Chorus of Genoese Sailors
- Chorus of Moorish Sea-Rovers

== Musical numbers ==
- No.1. Choruses of sailors and women – "The windlass ply, the cable haul"
- No.2. Recitative, Song and Chorus – Il Marinajo and Sailors – "'Tis the mid-watch of night … The wave at her bows is afire"
- No.3. Recitative – La Sposina – "From spring-time on to summer draws the year"
- No.4. Song and Chorus – La Sposina and Women – "Soft and sadly sea-wind swell"
- No.5. Moresque – Instrumental
- No.6. Recitative and Chorus – Il Marinajo – "The Crescent o'er the Cross is hoisted high ... Alla'hu ak'bar"
- No.7. Recitative – Il Marinajo v "They chain not Christian souls that chain their limbs!"
- No.8. Chorus of Sailors (prisoners) at the oar – "With a will, oh brothers, with one will for all"
- No.9. Recitative and Duet – Il Marinajo and La Sposina – "Hark! on the night - the clash of falling chains … Here on thy heart, where I ne'er hoped to rest"
- No.10. Chorus – "Sink and scatter, clouds of war"
