= Arthur Sullivan =

British composer (1842–1900)

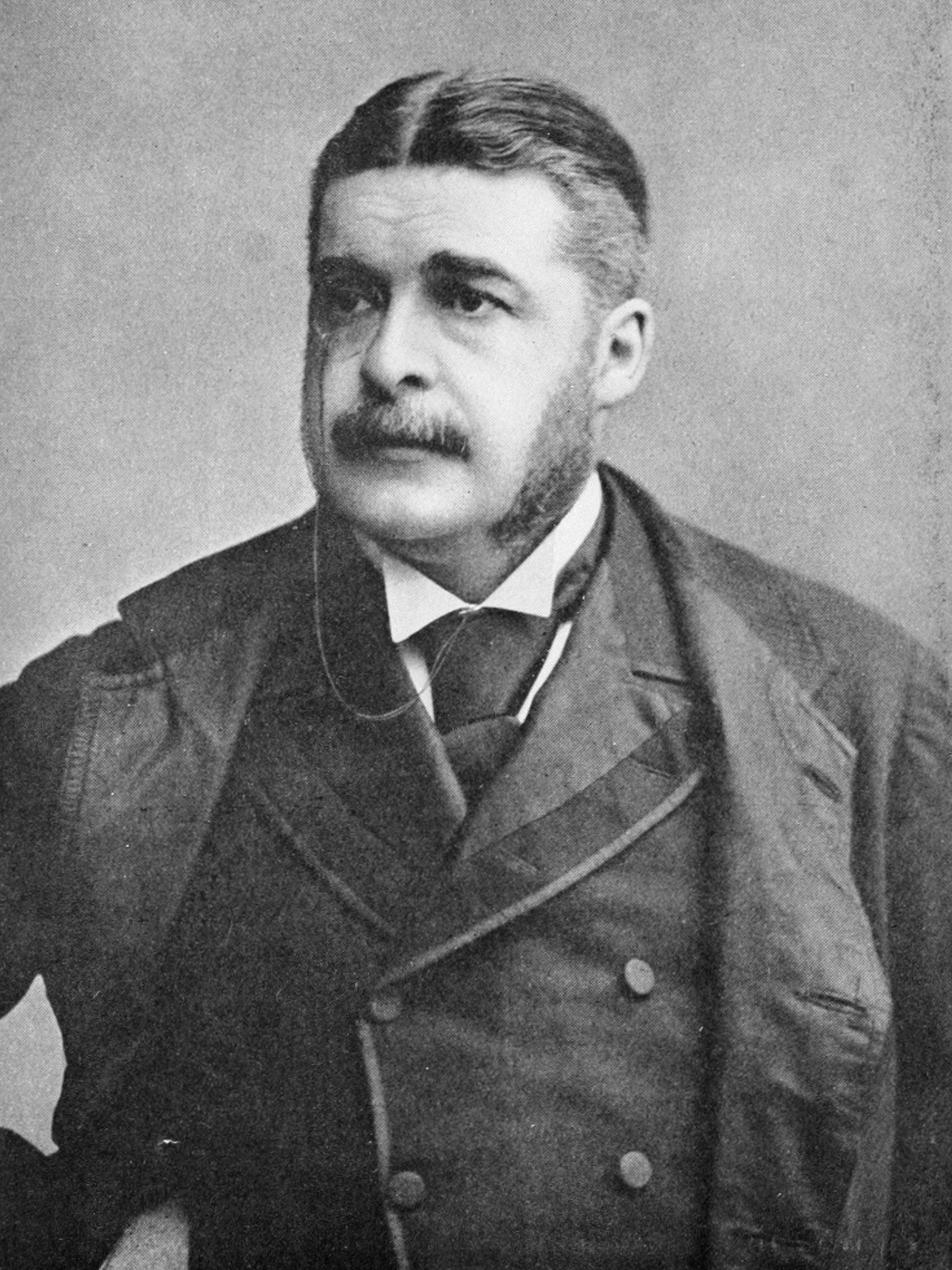
Sullivan in 1888

Sir Arthur Seymour Sullivan (13 May 1842 – 22 November 1900) was an English composer. He is best known for 14 comic opera collaborations with the dramatist W. S. Gilbert, including H.M.S. Pinafore, The Pirates of Penzance and The Mikado. His works include 24 operas, 11 major orchestral works, ten choral works and oratorios, two ballets, incidental music to several plays, and numerous church pieces, songs, and piano and chamber pieces. His hymns and songs include "Onward, Christian Soldiers" and "The Lost Chord".

The son of a military bandmaster, Sullivan composed his first anthem at the age of eight and was later a soloist in the boys' choir of the Chapel Royal. In 1856, at 14, he was awarded the first Mendelssohn Scholarship by the Royal Academy of Music, which allowed him to study at the academy and then at the Leipzig Conservatoire in Germany. His graduation piece, incidental music to Shakespeare's The Tempest (1861), was received with acclaim on its first performance in London. Among his early major works were a ballet, L'Île Enchantée (1864), a symphony, a cello concerto (both 1866), and his Overture di Ballo (1870). To supplement the income from his concert works he wrote hymns, parlour ballads and other light pieces, and worked as a church organist and music teacher.

In 1866 Sullivan composed a one-act comic opera, Cox and Box, which is still widely performed. He wrote his first opera with W. S. Gilbert, Thespis, in 1871. Four years later, the impresario Richard D'Oyly Carte engaged Gilbert and Sullivan to create a one-act piece, Trial by Jury (1875). Its box-office success led to a series of twelve full-length comic operas by the collaborators. After the extraordinary success of H.M.S. Pinafore (1878) and The Pirates of Penzance (1879), Carte used his profits from the partnership to build the Savoy Theatre in 1881, and their joint works became known as the Savoy operas. Among the best known of the later operas are The Mikado (1885) and The Gondoliers (1889). Gilbert broke from Sullivan and Carte in 1890, after a quarrel over expenses at the Savoy. They reunited in the 1890s for two more operas, but these did not achieve the popularity of their earlier works.

Sullivan's infrequent serious pieces during the 1880s included two cantatas, The Martyr of Antioch (1880) and The Golden Legend (1886), his most popular choral work. He also wrote incidental music for West End productions of several Shakespeare plays, and held conducting and academic appointments. Sullivan's only grand opera, Ivanhoe, though initially successful in 1891, has rarely been revived. In his last decade Sullivan continued to compose comic operas with various librettists and wrote other major and minor works. He died at the age of 58, regarded as Britain's foremost composer. His comic opera style served as a model for generations of musical theatre composers that followed, and his music is still frequently performed, recorded and pastiched.

== Life and career ==
=== Early life ===
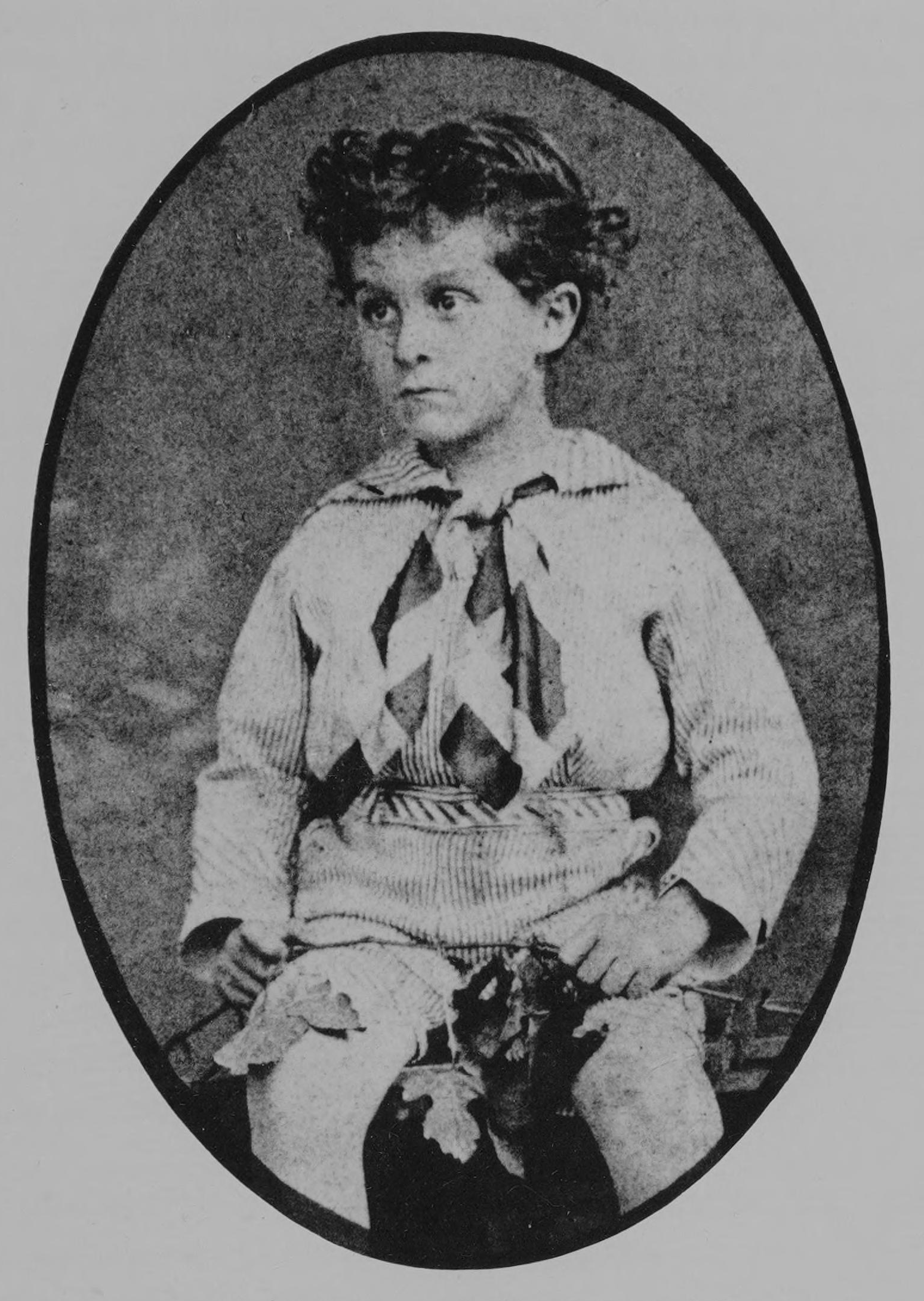
Aged four or five

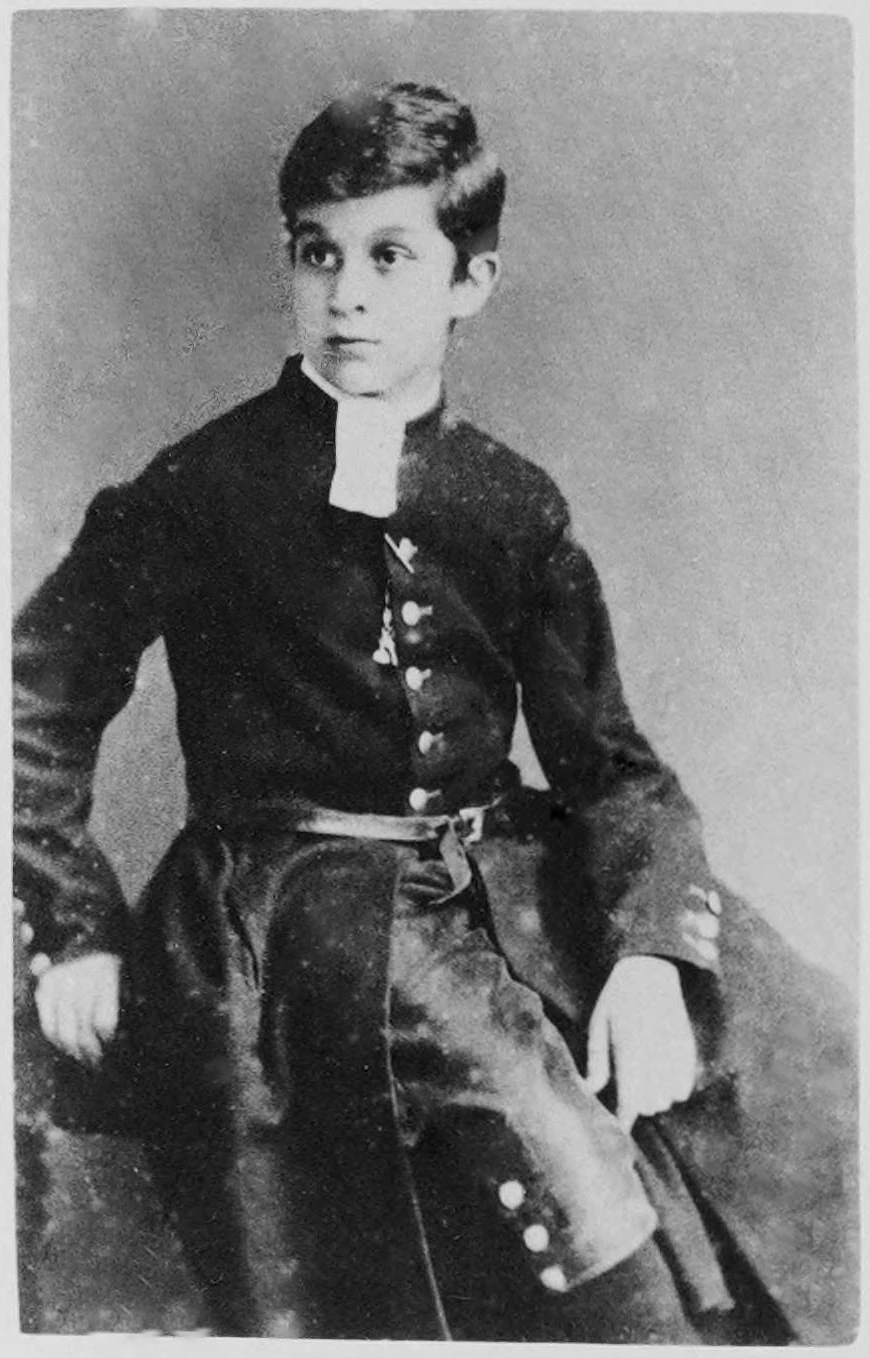
Aged twelve

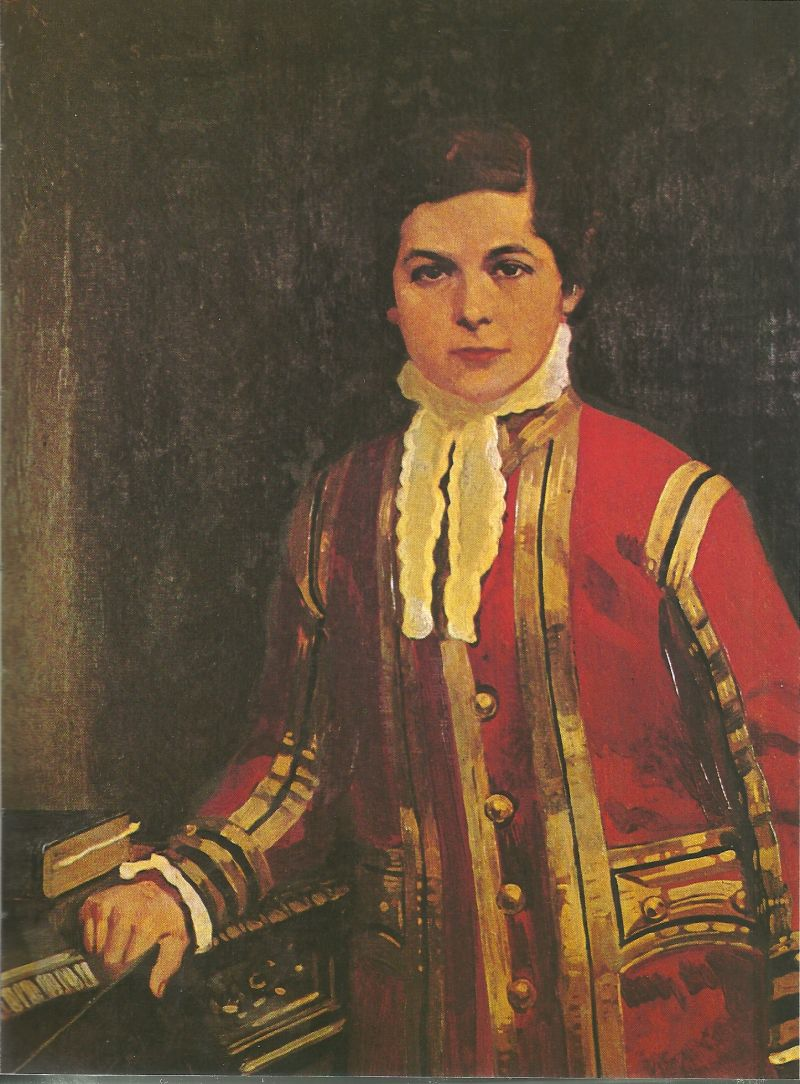
As Chapel Royal chorister

Sullivan was born on 13 May 1842 in Lambeth, London, the younger of the two children, both boys, of Thomas Sullivan (1805–1866) and his wife, Mary Clementina (née Coghlan; 1811–1882). His father was a military bandmaster, clarinettist and music teacher, born in Ireland and raised in Chelsea, London; his mother was English born, of Irish and Italian descent. Thomas Sullivan was based from 1845 to 1857 at the Royal Military College, Sandhurst, where he was the bandmaster and taught music privately to supplement his income. Young Arthur became proficient with many of the instruments in the band and composed an anthem, "By the Waters of Babylon", when he was eight. He later recalled:

I was intensely interested in all that the band did, and learned to play every wind instrument, with which I formed not merely a passing acquaintance, but a real, life-long, intimate friendship. I gradually learned the peculiarities of each ... what it could do and what it was unable to do. I learned in the best possible way how to write for an orchestra.

While recognising the boy's obvious talent, his father knew the insecurity of a musical career and discouraged him from pursuing it. Sullivan studied at a private school in Bayswater. In 1854 he persuaded his parents and the headmaster to allow him to apply for membership in the choir of the Chapel Royal. Despite concerns that, at nearly 12 years of age, Sullivan was too old to give much service as a treble before his voice broke, he was accepted and soon became a soloist. By 1856, he was promoted to "first boy". Even at this age, his health was delicate, and he was easily fatigued.

Sullivan flourished under the training of the Reverend Thomas Helmore, Master of the Children of the Chapel Royal, and began to write anthems and songs. Helmore encouraged his compositional talent and arranged for one of his pieces, "O Israel", to be published in 1855, his first published work. Helmore enlisted Sullivan's assistance in creating harmonisations for a volume of The Hymnal Noted and arranged for the boy's compositions to be performed; one anthem was performed at the Chapel Royal in St James's Palace under the direction of Sir George Smart.

=== Mendelssohn scholar ===
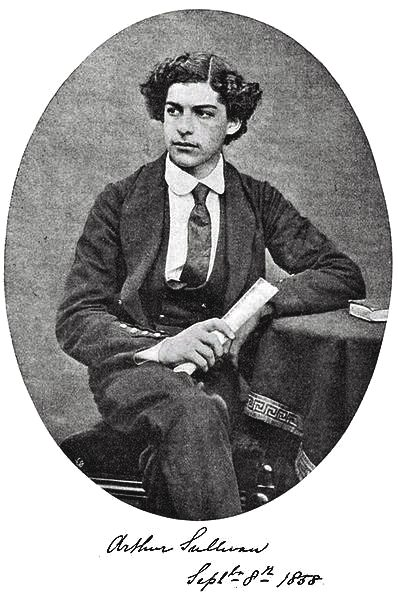
Sullivan aged 16, in his Royal Academy of Music uniform

In 1856 the Royal Academy of Music awarded the first Mendelssohn Scholarship to the 14-year-old Sullivan, granting him a year's training at the academy. (Note: In 1848, Jenny Lind performed the soprano part to Felix Mendelssohn's oratorio Elijah, which he had written for her. The concert raised £1,000 to fund a scholarship in his name. After Sullivan became the first recipient of the scholarship, Lind encouraged him in his career.) His principal teacher there was John Goss, whose own teacher, Thomas Attwood, had been a pupil of Mozart. He studied piano with William Sterndale Bennett (the future head of the academy) and Arthur O'Leary. During this first year at the academy Sullivan continued to sing solos with the Chapel Royal, which provided a small amount of spending money.

Sullivan's scholarship was extended to a second year, and in 1858, in what his biographer Arthur Jacobs calls an "extraordinary gesture of confidence", the scholarship committee extended his grant for a third year so that he could study in Germany, at the Leipzig Conservatoire. There, Sullivan studied composition with Julius Rietz and Carl Reinecke, counterpoint with Moritz Hauptmann and Ernst Richter, and the piano with Louis Plaidy and Ignaz Moscheles. He was trained in Mendelssohn's ideas and techniques but was also exposed to a variety of styles, including those of Schubert, Verdi, Bach and Wagner. Visiting a synagogue, he was so struck by some of the cadences and progressions of the music that thirty years later he could recall them for use in his grand opera, Ivanhoe. He became friendly with the future impresario Carl Rosa and the violinist Joseph Joachim, among others.

The academy renewed Sullivan's scholarship to allow him a second year of study at Leipzig. For his third and last year there, his father scraped together the money for living expenses, and the conservatoire assisted by waiving its fees. Sullivan's graduation piece, completed in 1861, was a suite of incidental music to Shakespeare's The Tempest. Revised and expanded, it was performed at the Crystal Palace in 1862, a year after his return to London; The Musical Times described it as a sensation. He began building a reputation as England's most promising young composer.

=== Rising composer ===
Colleagues and collaborators: clockwise from top left, George Grove, F. C. Burnand, Richard D'Oyly Carte, W. S. Gilbert

Sullivan embarked on his composing career with a series of ambitious works, interspersed with hymns, parlour songs and other light pieces in a more commercial vein. His compositions were not enough to support him financially, and between 1861 and 1872 he worked as a church organist, which he enjoyed; as a music teacher, which he hated and gave up as soon as he could; and as an arranger of vocal scores of popular operas. (Note: Between 1861 and 1872 Sullivan worked as an organist at two fashionable London churches: St Michael's Church, Chester Square, Pimlico, and St Peter's, Cranley Gardens, Kensington. He taught, among other places, at the Crystal Palace School. Between 1860 and 1870 he arranged seven vocal scores of operas for Boosey and Co: Beethoven's Fidelio, Bellini's La sonnambula, Flotow's Martha, Gounod's Faust, Mozart's Don Giovanni, Rossini's The Barber of Seville and Verdi's Il trovatore, and he collaborated with Josiah Pittman in arranging 25 other operas by some of the above and Auber, Balfe, Donizetti, Meyerbeer, Wagner and Weber.) He took an early opportunity to compose several pieces for royalty in connection with the wedding of the Prince of Wales in 1863.

With The Masque at Kenilworth (Birmingham Festival, 1864), Sullivan began his association with works for voice and orchestra. While an organist at the Royal Italian Opera, Covent Garden, he composed his first ballet, L'Île Enchantée (1864). His Irish Symphony and Cello Concerto (both 1866) were his only works in their respective genres. In the same year, his Overture in C (In Memoriam), commemorating the recent death of his father, was a commission from the Norwich Festival. It achieved considerable popularity. In June 1867 the Philharmonic Society gave the first performance of his overture Marmion. The reviewer for The Times called it "another step in advance on the part of the only composer of any remarkable promise that just at present we can boast." In October, Sullivan travelled with George Grove to Vienna in search of neglected scores by Schubert. They unearthed manuscript copies of symphonies and vocal music, and were particularly elated by their final discovery, the incidental music to Rosamunde. (Note: They were permitted to copy the Rosamunde score and two of the symphonies – the Fourth and Sixth – and inspected four others (the First, Second, Third and Fifth), to the existence of which they quickly drew the attention of the musical world. Grove described their final discovery: "I found, at the bottom of the cupboard and in its farthest corner, a bundle of music books two feet high, carefully tied round, and black with the undisturbed dust of nearly half-a-century. ... There were the part books of the whole of the music in Rosamunde, tied up after the second performance, in December 1823, and probably never disturbed since. Dr. Schneider [Schubert's nephew] must have been amused at our excitement ... at any rate, he kindly overlooked it, and gave us permission to ... copy what we wanted.")

Sullivan's first attempt at opera, The Sapphire Necklace (1863–64) to a libretto by Henry F. Chorley, was not produced and is now lost, except for the overture and two songs that were separately published. His first surviving opera, Cox and Box (1866), was written for a private performance. It then received charity performances in London and Manchester, and was later produced at the Gallery of Illustration, where it ran for an extraordinary 264 performances. W. S. Gilbert, writing in Fun magazine, pronounced the score superior to F. C. Burnand's libretto. Sullivan and Burnand were soon commissioned by Thomas German Reed for a two-act opera, The Contrabandista (1867; revised and expanded as The Chieftain in 1894), but it did not do as well. Among Sullivan's early part songs is "The Long Day Closes" (1868). Sullivan's last major work of the 1860s was a short oratorio, The Prodigal Son, first given in Worcester Cathedral as part of the 1869 Three Choirs Festival to much praise.

=== 1870s: first collaborations with Gilbert ===
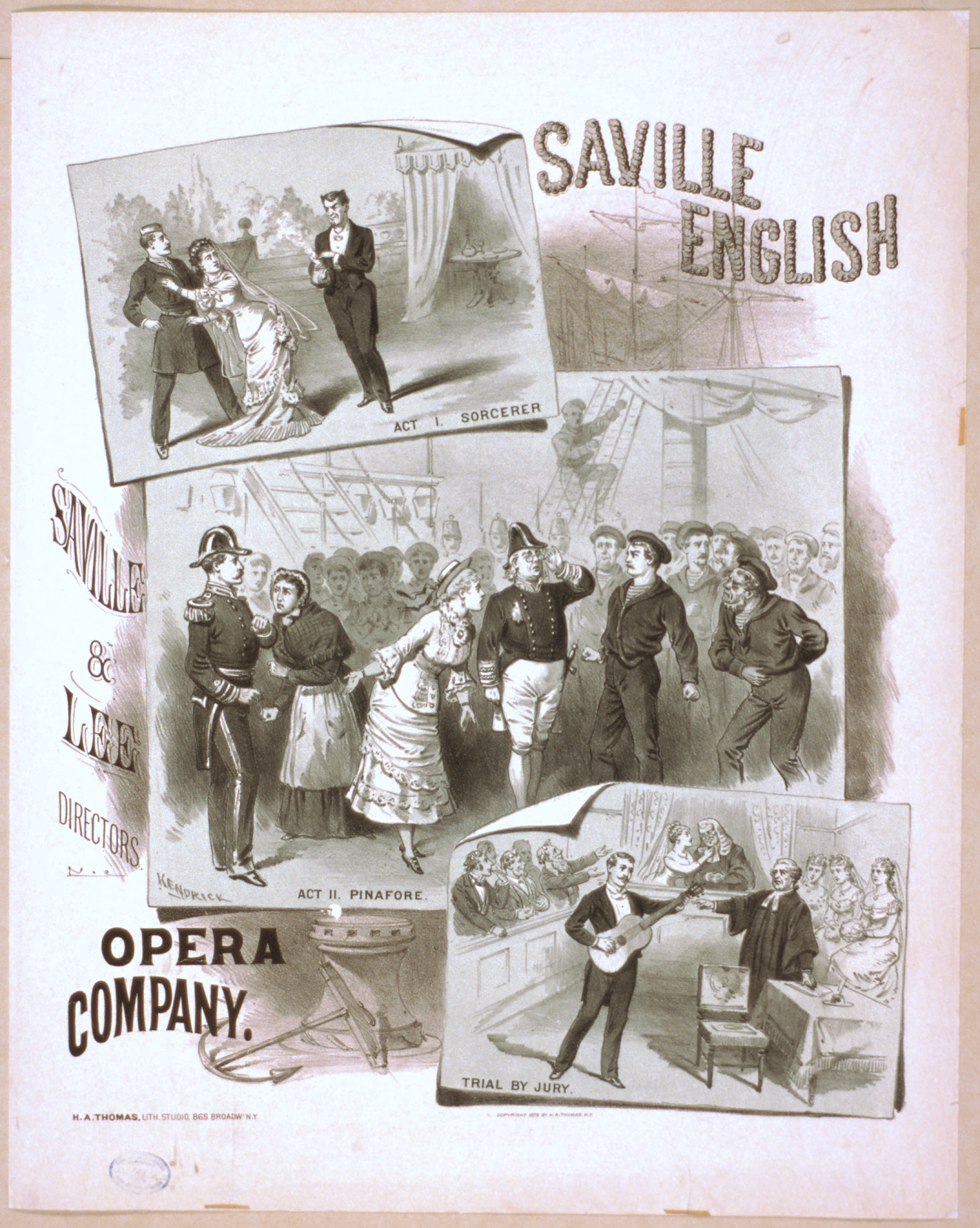
Poster: scenes from The Sorcerer, H.M.S. Pinafore and Trial by Jury

Sullivan's most enduring orchestral work, the Overture di Ballo, was composed for the Birmingham Festival in 1870. (Note: The work received an enthusiastic public reception, but The Musical Times printed an early example of critical censure of Sullivan for his accessibility: "The applause which it received was general and spontaneous [but] it may be a question whether, if Mr. Sullivan could not be requested to furnish a higher class of work, he should not have been passed over altogether until a more fitting opportunity presented itself.") The same year, Sullivan first met the poet and dramatist W. S. Gilbert. (Note: They met at a rehearsal for a second run of Gilbert's Ages Ago at the Gallery of Illustration, probably in July 1870. Gilbert was then known for his light verse, especially his Bab Ballads; his theatre reviews; and his two dozen plays, including operatic burlesques (such as Robert the Devil, 1868), his German Reed Entertainments, and blank verse comedies such as The Palace of Truth (1870) and Pygmalion and Galatea (1871).) In 1871 Sullivan published his only song cycle, The Window, to words by Tennyson, and he wrote the first of a series of incidental music scores for productions of Shakespeare plays. (Note: This was for Merchant of Venice at the Prince's Theatre, Manchester. Sullivan's earlier Tempest music was composed for the concert hall, rather than theatrical performance, although it was later used for at least one stage production.) He also composed a dramatic cantata, On Shore and Sea, for the opening of the London International Exhibition, and the hymn "Onward, Christian Soldiers", with words by Sabine Baring-Gould. The Salvation Army adopted the latter as its favoured processional, and it became Sullivan's best-known hymn.

At the end of 1871 John Hollingshead, proprietor of London's Gaiety Theatre, commissioned Sullivan to work with Gilbert to create the burlesque-style comic opera Thespis. (Note: With a classical story and a mixture of political satire and grand opera parody, Thespis was reminiscent of Orpheus in the Underworld and La belle Hélène by Offenbach, whose operettas were extremely popular on the English stage in both French and English. La belle Hélène entered the Gaiety's repertory eight weeks before the premiere of Thespis. Sullivan may have been encouraged to write the music for Thespis by Hollingshead's offer of the role of Apollo to the composer's elder brother, the comic actor and singer Fred Sullivan.) Played as a Christmas entertainment, it ran through to Easter 1872, a good run for such a piece. (Note: Its run was extended beyond the length of a normal run at the Gaiety. The musical score of Thespis was never published and is now lost, except for one song that was published separately, a chorus that was re-used in The Pirates of Penzance, and the Act II ballet.) Gilbert and Sullivan then went their separate ways until they collaborated on three parlour ballads in late 1874 and early 1875.

Sullivan's large-scale works of the early 1870s were the Festival Te Deum (Crystal Palace, 1872) and the oratorio The Light of the World (Birmingham Festival, 1873). He provided incidental music for productions of The Merry Wives of Windsor at the Gaiety in 1874 and Henry VIII at the Theatre Royal, Manchester, in 1877. He continued to compose hymns throughout the decade. (Note: Sullivan composed 72 hymns, including two settings of "Nearer, My God, to Thee", of which the "Propior Deo" is the better known.) In 1873 Sullivan contributed songs to Burnand's Christmas "drawing room extravaganza", The Miller and His Man.

In 1875 the manager of the Royalty Theatre, Richard D'Oyly Carte, needed a short piece to fill out a bill with Offenbach's La Périchole. Carte had conducted Sullivan's Cox and Box. (Note: Carte conducted Cox and Box and some operettas on a tour, in 1871, managed by the composer's brother, Fred, who played Cox. Cox and Box, again with Fred as Cox, had been revived in 1874, and Arthur Sullivan may have been considering a return to comic opera.) Remembering that Gilbert had suggested a libretto to him, Carte engaged Sullivan to set it, and the result was the one-act comic opera Trial by Jury. (Note: The title page of the libretto describes Trial as "A Dramatic Cantata"; Gilbert and Sullivan insisted on calling the rest of their joint works "operas", often with a descriptive adjective, such as a "nautical comic opera" (Jacobs, p. 118), an "aesthetic opera" or a "Japanese opera" (Jacobs, Preface).) Trial, starring Sullivan's brother Fred as the Learned Judge, became a surprise hit, earning glowing praise from the critics and playing for 300 performances over its first few seasons. The Daily Telegraph commented that the piece illustrated the composer's "great capacity for dramatic writing of the lighter class", and other reviews emphasised the felicitous combination of Gilbert's words and Sullivan's music. One wrote, "it seems, as in the great Wagnerian operas, as though poem and music had proceeded simultaneously from one and the same brain." A few months later, another Sullivan one-act comic opera opened: The Zoo, with a libretto by B. C. Stephenson. It was less successful than Trial, and for the next 15 years Sullivan's sole operatic collaborator was Gilbert; the partners created a further twelve operas together.

"The Lost Chord"
1913 recording of "The Lost Chord" (1877) by Arthur Sullivan and Adelaide Anne Procter, sung by Reed Miller

Sullivan also turned out more than 80 popular songs and parlour ballads, most of them written before the end of the 1870s. His first popular song was "Orpheus with his Lute" (1866), and a well-received part song was "Oh! Hush thee, my Babie" (1867). The best known of his songs is "The Lost Chord" (1877, lyrics by Adelaide Anne Procter), written at the bedside of his brother during Fred's last illness. The sheet music for his best-received songs sold in large numbers and was an important part of his income. (Note: Later, songs from the Gilbert and Sullivan operas were adapted and sold as dance pieces.)

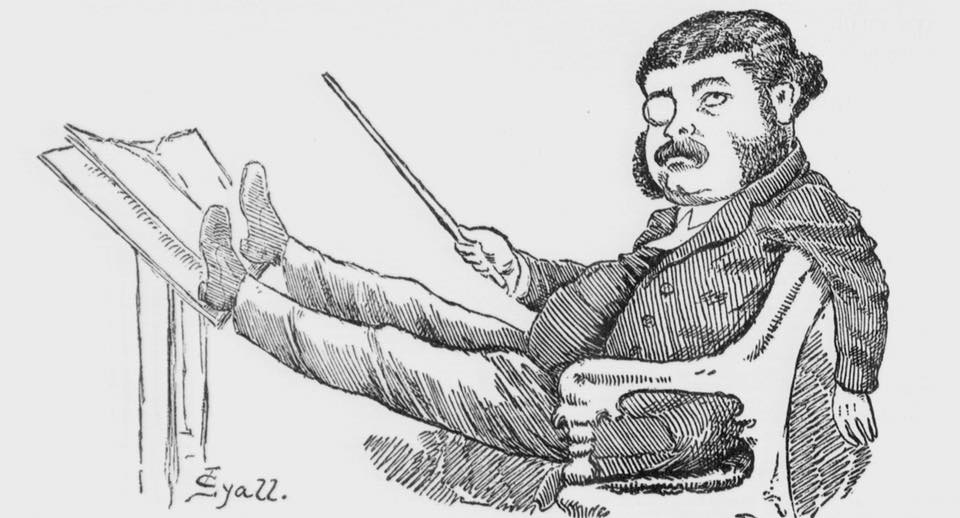
Caricature of Sullivan as a conductor, c. 1879

In this decade, Sullivan's conducting appointments included the Glasgow Choral Union concerts (1875–77) and the Royal Aquarium Theatre, London (1876). In addition to his appointment as Professor of Composition at the Royal Academy of Music, of which he was a Fellow, he was appointed as the first Principal of the National Training School of Music in 1876. He accepted the latter post reluctantly, fearing that discharging the duties thoroughly would leave too little time for composing; in this he was correct. (Note: His successor Hubert Parry also discovered this to be true.) He was not effective in the post, and resigned in 1881. (Note: In a study of the School and its successor, the Royal College of Music, David Wright comments on Sullivan: "He lacked any fresh perspective on musical training and any vision of what the NTSM needed to achieve if it was to make a mark. ... Neither did Sullivan have real sympathy with the Society of Arts' progressive social ideals of scholarship education regardless of social origin, despite having himself gained his education through scholarship support.")

Sullivan's next collaboration with Gilbert, The Sorcerer (1877), ran for 178 performances, a success by the standards of the day, but H.M.S. Pinafore (1878), which followed it, turned Gilbert and Sullivan into an international phenomenon. Sullivan composed the bright and cheerful music of Pinafore while suffering from excruciating pain from a kidney stone. Pinafore ran for 571 performances in London, then the second-longest theatrical run in history, and more than 150 unauthorised productions were quickly mounted in America alone. (Note: Gilbert, Sullivan and Carte tried for many years to control the American performance copyrights over their operas, but they were unable to do so.) Among other favourable reviews, The Times noted that the opera was an early attempt at the establishment of a "national musical stage" free from risqué French "improprieties" and without the "aid" of Italian and German musical models. The Times and several of the other papers agreed that although the piece was entertaining, Sullivan was capable of higher art, and frivolous light opera would hold him back. This criticism would follow Sullivan throughout his career.

In 1879 Sullivan suggested to a reporter from The New York Times the secret of his success with Gilbert: "His ideas are as suggestive for music as they are quaint and laughable. His numbers ... always give me musical ideas." Pinafore was followed by The Pirates of Penzance in 1879, which opened in New York and then ran in London for 363 performances.

=== Early 1880s ===
Scenes from The Golden Legend at the Leeds Music Festival, 1886

In 1880 Sullivan was appointed director of the triennial Leeds Music Festival. He had earlier been commissioned to write a sacred choral work for the festival and chose, as its subject, Henry Hart Milman's 1822 dramatic poem based on the life and death of St Margaret of Antioch. The Martyr of Antioch was first performed at the Leeds Festival in October 1880. Gilbert adapted the libretto for Sullivan, who, in gratitude, presented his collaborator with an engraved silver cup inscribed "W.S. Gilbert from his friend Arthur Sullivan." (Note: Gilbert replied, "it most certainly never occurred to me to look for any other reward than the honour of being associated, however remotely and unworthily, in a success which, I suppose, will endure until music itself shall die. Pray believe that of the many substantial advantages that have resulted to me from our association, this last is, and always will be, the most highly prized.") Sullivan was not a showy conductor, and some thought him dull and old-fashioned on the podium, (Note: The Viennese music critic Eduard Hanslick wrote of Sullivan's conducting of a Mozart symphony: "Sullivan presides on the podium from the comfortable recesses of a commodious armchair, his left arm lazily extended on the arm-rest, his right giving the beat in a mechanical way, his eyes fastened on the score. ... Sullivan never looked up from the notes; it was as though he was reading at sight. The heavenly piece plodded along for better or for worse, listlessly, insensibly." Bernard Shaw, who praised Sullivan as a composer ("They trained him to make Europe yawn, and he took advantage of their teaching to make London and New York laugh and whistle."), commented: "Under his bâton orchestras are never deficient in refinement. Coarseness, exaggeration, and carelessness are unacquainted with him. So, unfortunately, are vigor and earnestness." Vernon Blackburn of the Pall Mall Gazette thought that Sullivan conducted Mendelssohn's Elijah "quite extraordinarily well. This is a rather subtle conductor who makes his effects almost unexpectedly, so reticent is his manner and so quiet his method. Yet effects are there, and … are marked by a great smoothness in the linking of phrase with phrase, and in consequence by a wonderful fluent continuousness of melody.") but Martyr had an enthusiastic reception and was frequently revived. Other critics and performers had favourable reactions to Sullivan's conducting, and he had a busy conducting career in parallel with his composing career, including seven Leeds Festivals among many other appointments. Sullivan invariably conducted the opening nights of the Gilbert and Sullivan operas.

Carte opened the next Gilbert and Sullivan piece, Patience, in April 1881 at London's Opera Comique, where their past three operas had played. In October, Patience transferred to the new, larger, state-of-the-art Savoy Theatre, built with the profits of the previous Gilbert and Sullivan works. The rest of the partnership's collaborations were produced at the Savoy, and are widely known as the "Savoy operas". (Note: The term came to be applied to all 13 surviving Gilbert and Sullivan operas, and extended, by some writers, to the other comic operas and companion pieces produced at the Savoy Theatre until 1909. The Oxford English Dictionary defines the phrase as: "Designating any of the Gilbert and Sullivan operas originally presented at the Savoy Theatre in London by the D'Oyly Carte company. Also used more generally to designate any of the Gilbert and Sullivan operas, including those first presented before the Savoy Theatre opened in 1881, or to designate any comic opera of a similar style which appeared at the theatre".) Iolanthe (1882), the first new opera to open at the Savoy, was Gilbert and Sullivan's fourth hit in a row. Sullivan, despite the financial security of writing for the Savoy, increasingly viewed the composition of comic operas as unimportant, beneath his skills, and also repetitious. After Iolanthe, Sullivan had not intended to write further Savoy operas. He suffered a serious financial loss when his broker went bankrupt in November 1882, and his biographers have speculated that this loss contributed to his decision to continue collaborating with Gilbert. In February 1883, he and Gilbert signed a five-year agreement with Carte requiring them to produce new comic operas on six months' notice.

On 22 May 1883 Sullivan was knighted by Queen Victoria for his "services ... rendered to the promotion of the art of music" in Britain. The musical establishment, and many critics, believed that this should end his career as a composer of comic opera – that a musical knight should not stoop below oratorio or grand opera. Having just signed the five-year agreement, Sullivan suddenly felt trapped. The next opera, Princess Ida (1884, the duo's only three-act, blank verse work), had a shorter run than its four predecessors; Sullivan's score was praised. With box office receipts lagging in March 1884, Carte gave the six months' notice, under the partnership contract, requiring a new opera. Sullivan's close friend, the composer Frederic Clay, had recently suffered a career-ending stroke at the age of 45. Sullivan, reflecting on this, on his own long-standing kidney problems, and on his desire to devote himself to more serious music, replied to Carte, "[I]t is impossible for me to do another piece of the character of those already written by Gilbert and myself."

Programme for The Mikado, 1885

Gilbert had already started work on a new opera in which the characters fell in love against their wills after taking a magic lozenge. Sullivan wrote on 1 April 1884 that he had "come to the end of my tether" with the operas: "I have been continually keeping down the music in order that not one [syllable] should be lost. ... I should like to set a story of human interest & probability where the humorous words would come in a humorous (not serious) situation, & where, if the situation were a tender or dramatic one the words would be of similar character." In a lengthy exchange of correspondence, Sullivan pronounced Gilbert's plot sketch (particularly the "lozenge" element) unacceptably mechanical, and too similar in both its grotesque "elements of topsyturveydom" and in actual plot to their earlier work, especially The Sorcerer. (Note: Even after Gilbert made changes (but retained a magic lozenge that changed people into what they pretended to be), Sullivan did not accept it.) He repeatedly requested that Gilbert find a new subject. The impasse was finally resolved on 8 May when Gilbert proposed a plot that did not depend on any supernatural device. The result was Gilbert and Sullivan's most successful work, The Mikado (1885). The piece ran for 672 performances, which was the second-longest run for any work of musical theatre, and one of the longest runs of any theatre piece, up to that time. (Note: The longest-running piece of musical theatre was Robert Planquette's 1877 opéra-comique Les cloches de Corneville, which held the record until Alfred Cellier's operetta Dorothy ran for 931 performances beginning in 1886.)

=== Later 1880s ===
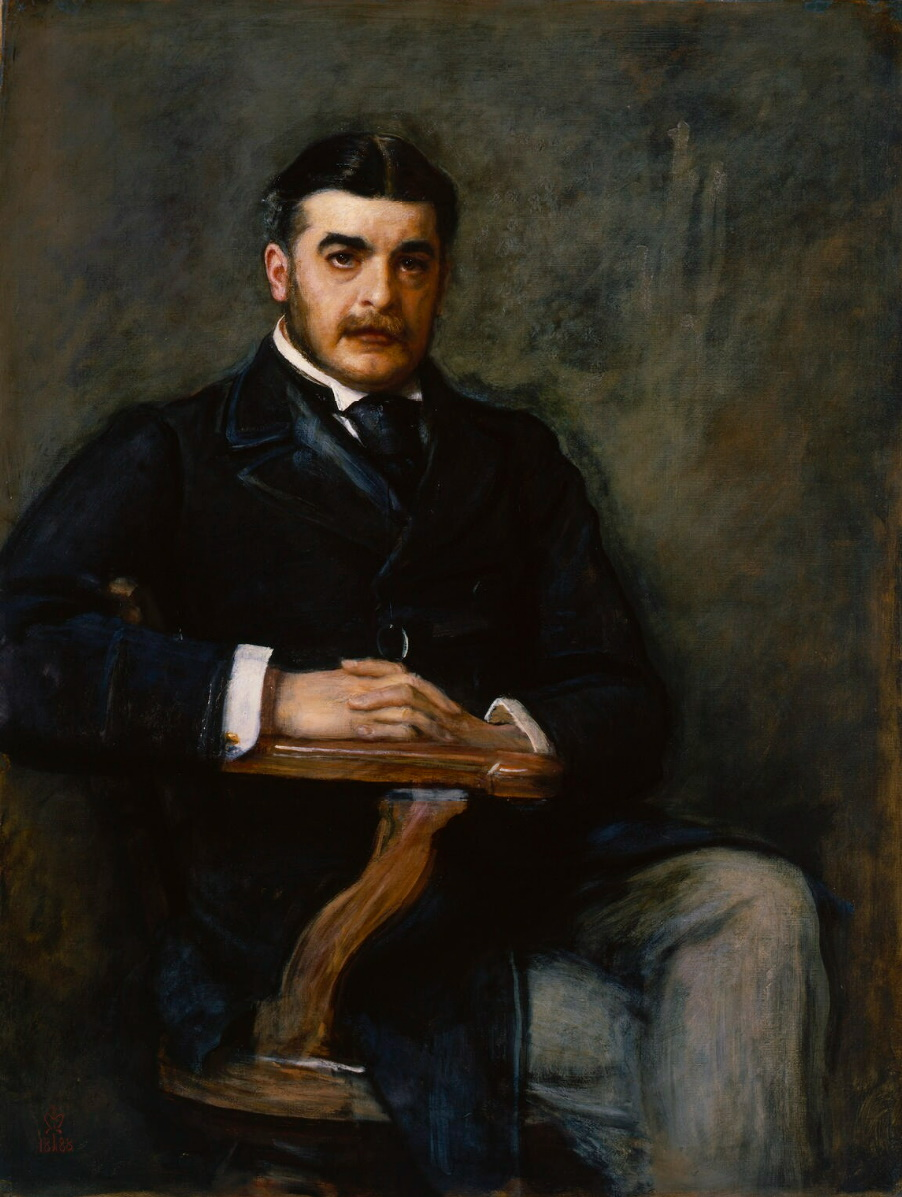
Portrait by Millais (1888) in the National Portrait Gallery, London

In 1886 Sullivan composed his second and last large-scale choral work of the decade. It was a cantata for the Leeds Festival, The Golden Legend, based on Longfellow's poem of the same name. Apart from the comic operas, this proved to be Sullivan's best received full-length work. It was given hundreds of performances during his lifetime, and at one point he declared a moratorium on its presentation, fearing that it would become over-exposed. Only Handel's Messiah was performed more often in Britain in the 1880s and 1890s. It remained in the repertory until about the 1920s, but since then it has seldom been performed; it received its first professional recording in 2001. The musical scholar and conductor David Russell Hulme writes that the work influenced Elgar and Walton. (Note: "King Olaf, Caractacus and Gerontius owe much to The Golden Legend – as, via them, does Walton's Belshazzar's Feast.")

Ruddigore followed The Mikado at the Savoy in 1887. It was profitable, but its nine-month run was disappointing compared with most of the earlier Savoy operas. For their next piece, Gilbert submitted another version of the magic lozenge plot, which Sullivan again rejected. Gilbert finally proposed a comparatively serious opera, to which Sullivan agreed. Although it was not a grand opera, The Yeomen of the Guard (1888) provided him with the opportunity to compose his most ambitious stage work to date. As early as 1883 Sullivan had been under pressure from the musical establishment to write a grand opera. In 1885 he told an interviewer, "The opera of the future is a compromise [among the French, German and Italian schools] – a sort of eclectic school, a selection of the merits of each one. I myself will make an attempt to produce a grand opera of this new school. ... Yes, it will be an historical work, and it is the dream of my life." After The Yeomen of the Guard opened, Sullivan turned again to Shakespeare, composing the incidental music for Henry Irving's Lyceum Theatre production of Macbeth (1888).

Sullivan wished to produce further serious works with Gilbert. He had collaborated with no other librettist since 1875. But Gilbert felt that the reaction to The Yeomen of the Guard had "not been so convincing as to warrant us in assuming that the public want something more earnest still". He proposed instead that Sullivan should go ahead with his plan to write a grand opera, but should continue also to compose comic works for the Savoy. (Note: Gilbert wrote, "We have a name, jointly, for humorous work, tempered with occasional glimpses of earnest drama. I think we should do unwisely if we left, altogether, the path which we have trodden together so long and so successfully. I can quite understand your desire to write a big work, well, why not write one? But why abandon the Savoy business? Cannot the two things be done concurrently? If you can write an oratorio like The Martyr of Antioch while you are occupied by pieces like Patience and Iolanthe, can't you write a grand opera without giving up pieces like The Yeomen of the Guard?") Sullivan was not immediately persuaded. He replied, "I have lost the liking for writing comic opera, and entertain very grave doubts as to my power of doing it." (Note: Sullivan continued, "I have lost the necessary nerve for it, and it is not too much to say that it is distasteful to me. The types used over and over again (unavoidable in such a company as ours), the Grossmith part, the middle-aged woman with fading charms, cannot again be clothed in music by me. Nor can I again write to any wildly improbable plot in which there is not some human interest. ... You say that in serious opera, you must more or less sacrifice yourself. I say that this is just what I have been doing in all our joint pieces, and, what is more, must continue to do in comic opera to make it successful. Business and syllabic setting assume an importance which, however much they fetter me, cannot be overlooked. I am bound, in the interests of the piece, to give way. Hence the reason of my wishing to do a work where the music is to be the first consideration – where words are to suggest music, not govern it, and where music will intensify and emphasize the emotional effects of the words.) Nevertheless, Sullivan soon commissioned a grand opera libretto from Julian Sturgis (who was recommended by Gilbert), and suggested to Gilbert that he revive an old idea for an opera set in colourful Venice. The comic opera was completed first: The Gondoliers (1889) was a piece described by Gervase Hughes as a pinnacle of Sullivan's achievement. It was the last great Gilbert and Sullivan success.

=== 1890s ===
Ivanhoe, 1891

The relationship between Gilbert and Sullivan suffered its most serious breach in April 1890, during the run of The Gondoliers, when Gilbert objected to Carte's financial accounts for the production, including a charge to the partnership for the cost of new carpeting for the Savoy Theatre lobby. Gilbert believed that this was a maintenance expense that should be charged to Carte alone. Carte was building a new theatre to present Sullivan's forthcoming grand opera, and Sullivan sided with Carte, going so far as to sign an affidavit that contained erroneous information about old debts of the partnership. Gilbert took legal action against Carte and Sullivan, vowing to write no more for the Savoy, and so the partnership came to an acrimonious end. Sullivan wrote to Gilbert in September 1890 that he was "physically and mentally ill over this wretched business. I have not yet got over the shock of seeing our names coupled ... in hostile antagonism over a few miserable pounds".

Sullivan's only grand opera, Ivanhoe, based on Walter Scott's novel, opened at Carte's new Royal English Opera House on 31 January 1891. Sullivan completed the score too late to meet Carte's planned production date, and costs mounted; Sullivan was required to pay Carte a contractual penalty of £3,000 (equivalent to £333,000 in 2025) for his delay. The production lasted for 155 consecutive performances, an unprecedented run for a grand opera, and earned good notices for its music. Afterwards, Carte was unable to fill the new opera house with other opera productions and sold the theatre. Despite the initial success of Ivanhoe, some writers blamed it for the failure of the opera house, and it soon passed into obscurity. Herman Klein called the episode "the strangest comingling of success and failure ever chronicled in the history of British lyric enterprise!" Later in 1891 Sullivan composed music for Tennyson's The Foresters, which ran well at Daly's Theatre in New York in 1892, but failed in London the following year. (Note: Sullivan's biographers and scholars of his work have censured Tennyson's text. Gervase Hughes called it "puerile rubbish". Percy Young found it "Devoid of any kind of merit whatsoever." Sullivan's music was initially well-received, but Sullivan's biographers were not impressed: "One of Sullivan's lamest ... resourceless in magic" (Young); "[not] even one memorable number" (Jacobs). More recent critics have praised Sullivan's contribution.)

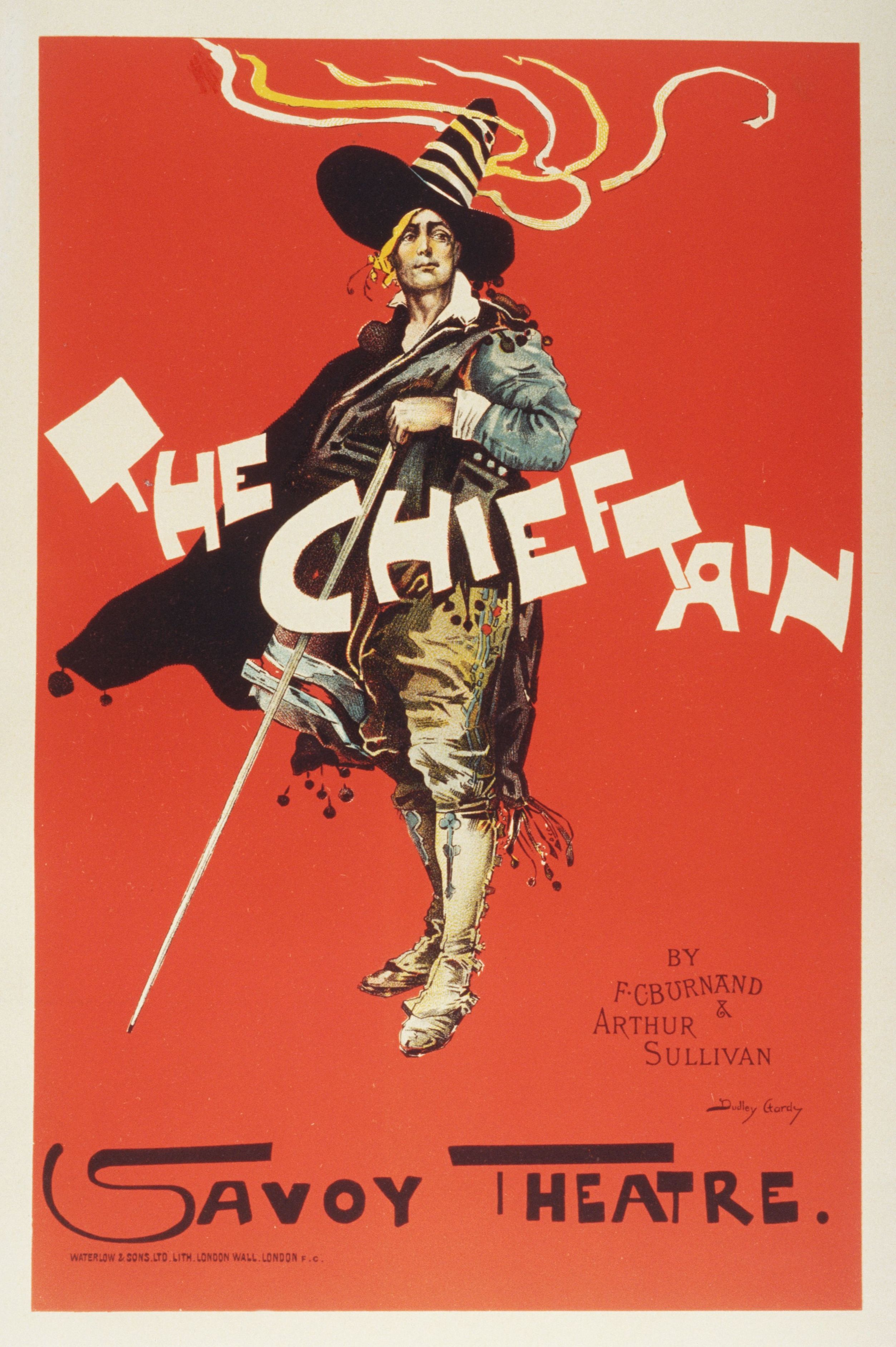
Poster for The Chieftain (1894)

Sullivan returned to comic opera, but because of the fracture with Gilbert, he and Carte sought other collaborators. Sullivan's next piece was Haddon Hall (1892), with a libretto by Sydney Grundy based loosely on the legend of the elopement of Dorothy Vernon with John Manners. Although still comic, the tone and style of the work was considerably more serious and romantic than most of the operas with Gilbert. It ran for 204 performances, and was praised by critics. In 1895 Sullivan once more provided incidental music for the Lyceum, this time for J. Comyns Carr's King Arthur.

With the aid of an intermediary, Sullivan's music publisher Tom Chappell, the three partners were reunited in 1892. Their next opera, Utopia, Limited (1893), ran for 245 performances, barely covering the expenses of the lavish production, although it was the longest run at the Savoy in the 1890s. Sullivan came to disapprove of the leading lady, Nancy McIntosh, and refused to write another piece featuring her; Gilbert insisted that she must appear in his next opera. Instead, Sullivan teamed up again with his old partner, F. C. Burnand. The Chieftain (1894), a heavily revised version of their earlier two-act opera, The Contrabandista, flopped. Gilbert and Sullivan reunited one more time, after McIntosh announced her retirement from the stage, for The Grand Duke (1896). It failed, and Sullivan never worked with Gilbert again, although their operas continued to be revived with success at the Savoy.

In May 1897 Sullivan's full-length ballet, Victoria and Merrie England, opened at the Alhambra Theatre to celebrate the Queen's Diamond Jubilee. The work celebrates English history and culture, with the Victorian period as the grand finale. Its six-month run was considered a great achievement. The Beauty Stone (1898), with a libretto by Arthur Wing Pinero and J. Comyns Carr, was based on mediaeval morality plays. The collaboration did not go well: Sullivan wrote that Pinero and Comyns Carr were "gifted and brilliant men, with no experience in writing for music", and, when he asked for alterations to improve the structure, they refused. The opera, moreover, was too serious for the Savoy audiences' tastes. It was a critical failure and ran for only seven weeks.

In November 1899, to benefit "the wives and children of soldiers and sailors" on active service in the Boer War, Sullivan composed the music of a song, "The Absent-Minded Beggar", to a text by Rudyard Kipling, which became an instant sensation and raised an unprecedented £300,000 (equivalent to £33,300,000 in 2025) for the fund from performances and the sale of sheet music and related merchandise. In The Rose of Persia (1899), Sullivan returned to his comic roots, writing to a libretto by Basil Hood that combined an exotic Arabian Nights setting with plot elements of The Mikado. Sullivan's tuneful score was well received, and the opera proved to be his most successful full-length collaboration apart from those with Gilbert. Another opera with Hood, The Emerald Isle, quickly went into preparation, but Sullivan died before it was completed. The score was finished by Edward German, and produced in 1901.

=== Death, honours and legacy ===
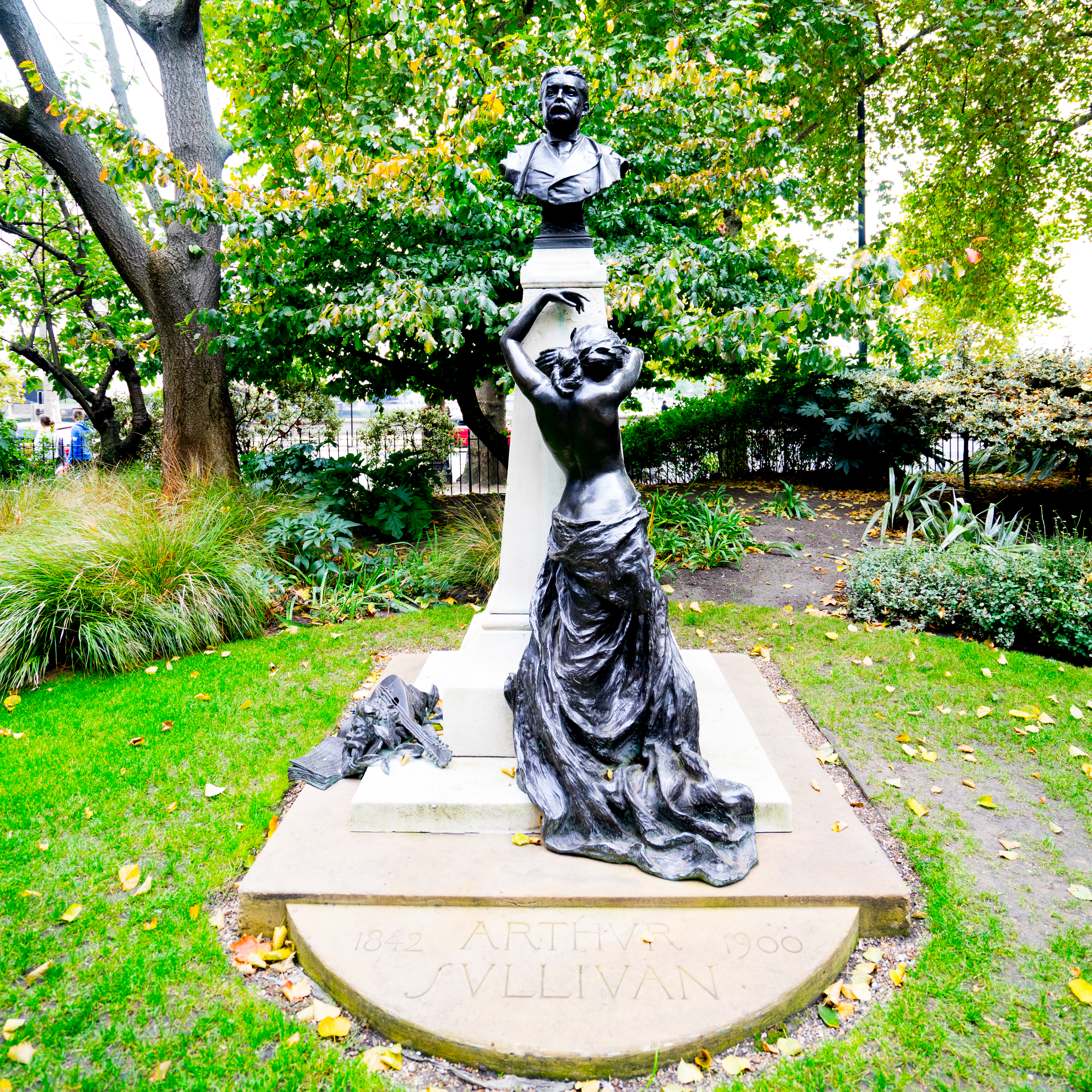
Arthur Sullivan Memorial, Victoria Embankment Gardens

Sullivan's health was never robust – from his thirties his kidney disease often obliged him to conduct sitting down. He died of heart failure, following an attack of bronchitis, at his flat in Westminster on 22 November 1900 at the age of 58. His Te Deum Laudamus, written in expectation of victory in the Boer War, was performed posthumously.

A monument in the composer's memory featuring a weeping Muse was erected in the Victoria Embankment Gardens in London and is inscribed with Gilbert's words from The Yeomen of the Guard: "Is life a boon? If so, it must befall that Death, whene'er he call, must call too soon". Sullivan wished to be buried in Brompton Cemetery with his parents and brother, but by order of the Queen he was buried in St Paul's Cathedral. In addition to his knighthood, honours awarded to Sullivan in his lifetime included Doctor in Music, honoris causa, by the Universities of Cambridge (1876) and Oxford (1879); Chevalier, Légion d'honneur, France (1878); Order of the Medjidie conferred by the Sultan of Turkey (1888); and appointment as a Member of the Fourth Class of the Royal Victorian Order (MVO) in 1897.

Sullivan's operas have often been adapted, first in the 19th century as dance pieces and in foreign adaptations of the operas themselves. Since then, his music has been made into ballets (Pineapple Poll (1951) and Pirates of Penzance – The Ballet! (1991)) and musicals (The Swing Mikado (1938), The Hot Mikado (1939) and Hot Mikado (1986), Hollywood Pinafore and Memphis Bound (both 1945), The Black Mikado (1975), etc.). His operas are frequently performed, and also parodied, pastiched, quoted and imitated in comedy routines, advertising, law, film, television, and other popular media. He has been portrayed on screen in The Story of Gilbert and Sullivan (1953) and Topsy-Turvy (2000). He is celebrated not only for writing the Savoy operas and his other works, but also for his influence on the development of modern American and British musical theatre.

== Personal life ==
=== Romantic life ===
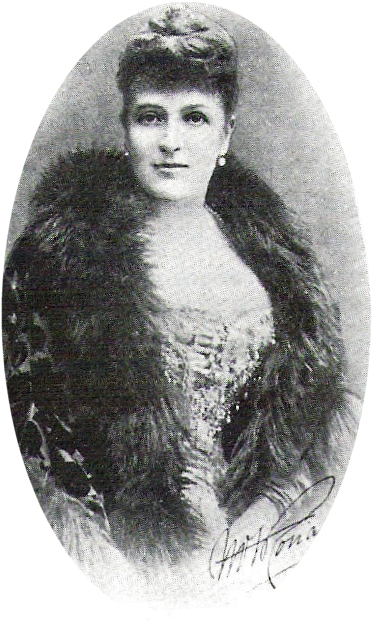
Fanny Ronalds

Sullivan never married, but he had serious love affairs with several women. The first was with Rachel Scott Russell (1845–1882), the daughter of the engineer John Scott Russell. Sullivan was a frequent visitor at the Scott Russell home in the mid-1860s, and by 1865 the affair was in full bloom. Rachel's parents did not approve of a possible union with a young composer of uncertain financial prospects, but the two continued to see each other covertly. At some point in 1868 Sullivan started a simultaneous (and secret) affair with Rachel's sister Louise (1841–1878). Both relationships ended by early 1869. (Note: Some two hundred love letters from the two Scott Russell women survive and are excerpted in detail in Wolfson.)

Sullivan's longest love affair was with the American socialite Fanny Ronalds, a woman three years his senior, who had separated from her American husband and was raising her children in Europe. He met her in Paris around 1867, and the affair began in earnest soon after she moved to London in 1871. According to a contemporary description of Ronalds, "Her face was perfectly divine in its loveliness, her features small and exquisitely regular. Her hair was a dark shade of brown – châtain foncé [deep chestnut] – and very abundant ... a lovely woman, with the most generous smile one could possibly imagine, and the most beautiful teeth." Sullivan called her "the best amateur singer in London". She often performed Sullivan's songs at her famous Sunday soirées. She became particularly associated with "The Lost Chord", singing it both in private and in public, often with Sullivan accompanying her. When Sullivan died, he left her the autograph manuscript of that song, along with other bequests.

Ronalds never divorced. Social conventions of the time compelled Sullivan and Ronalds to keep their relationship private. (Note: In Sullivan's diary, she appears as "Mrs. Ronalds" when he refers to their meetings in public, and "L. W." (for "Little Woman") or "D. H." (possibly "Dear Heart") for when they were alone together. When noting their private meetings, Sullivan indicated with tick marks the number of sexual acts completed. After the relationship with Ronalds had ceased to be sexual the tick marks no longer appeared alongside mentions of her, but continued to be used for his relationships with other women who have not been identified, and who were always referred to by their initials.) She apparently became pregnant at least twice and procured abortions in 1882 and 1884. Sullivan had a roving eye, and his diary records the occasional quarrels when Ronalds discovered his other liaisons, but he always returned to her. (Note: One such flirtation was with "Anna", whom he met in Paris in 1878.) Around 1889 or 1890 the sexual relationship evidently ended – he started to refer to her in his diary as "Auntie" – but she remained a constant companion for the rest of his life.

In 1896 the 54-year-old Sullivan proposed marriage to the 22-year-old Violet Beddington (1874–1962), but she refused him. (Note: Beddington later married Sydney Schiff, who used elements of her relationship with Sullivan in his 1925 novel Myrtle. She was the younger sister of Ada Beddington.)

=== Leisure and family life ===
Sullivan and his nephew Herbert ("Bertie")

Sullivan loved to spend time in France (both in Paris and on the Riviera), where his acquaintances included European royalty and where the casinos enabled him to indulge his passion for gambling. He enjoyed hosting private dinners and entertainments at his home, often featuring famous singers and well-known actors. In 1865 he was initiated into Freemasonry and was Grand Organist of the United Grand Lodge of England in 1887 during Queen Victoria's Golden Jubilee. Sullivan's talent and native charm gained him the friendship of many, not only in the musical establishment, such as Grove, Chorley and Herman Klein, but also in society circles, such as Alfred, Duke of Edinburgh. Sullivan enjoyed playing tennis; according to George Grossmith, "I have seen some bad lawn-tennis players in my time, but I never saw anyone so bad as Arthur Sullivan".

Sullivan was devoted to his parents, particularly his mother. He corresponded regularly with her when away from London, until her death in 1882. Henry Lytton wrote, "I believe there was never a more affectionate tie than that which existed between [Sullivan] and his mother, a very witty old lady, and one who took an exceptional pride in her son's accomplishments." Sullivan was also very fond of his brother Fred, whose acting career he assisted whenever possible, (Note: In 1871 Fred appeared as Cox in his brother's Cox and Box at the Alhambra Theatre, and he toured as Cox in his own production that summer. Later that year, he played Apollo in Gilbert and Sullivan's Thespis at the Gaiety Theatre, remaining at the Gaiety thereafter. He took his own company on tour in the summer of 1874, appearing in Cox and Box and The Contrabandista, and later that year he again played Cox, this time at the Gaiety. The next year, he created the role of the Learned Judge in Trial by Jury, a role that he would play in London and on tour for the rest of his career.) and of Fred's children. After Fred died at the age of 39, leaving his pregnant wife, Charlotte, with seven children under the age of 14, Sullivan visited the family often and became guardian to the children.

In 1883 Charlotte and six of her children emigrated to Los Angeles, California, leaving the oldest boy, "Bertie", in Sullivan's sole care. Despite his reservations about the move to the United States, Sullivan paid all the costs and gave substantial financial support to the family. A year later, Charlotte died, leaving the children to be raised mostly by her brother. (Note: One of the children, Frederic Richard Sullivan, went on to become a well-known film director.) From June to August 1885, after The Mikado opened, Sullivan visited the family in Los Angeles and took them on a sightseeing trip of the American west. Throughout the rest of his life, and in his will, he contributed financially to Fred's children, continuing to correspond with them and to be concerned with their education, marriages and financial affairs. Bertie remained with his uncle Arthur for the rest of the composer's life.

Three of Sullivan's cousins, the daughters of his uncle John Thomas Sullivan, performed with the D'Oyly Carte Opera Company: Rose, Jane ("Jennie") and Kate Sullivan, the first two of whom used the stage surname Hervey. Kate was a chorister who defected to the Comedy Opera Company's rival production of H.M.S. Pinafore, where she had the opportunity to play the leading soprano role, Josephine, in 1879. Jennie was a D'Oyly Carte chorister for fourteen years. Rose took principal roles in many of the companion pieces that played with the Savoy operas.

== Music ==
Sullivan's works comprise 24 operas, 11 full orchestral works, ten choral works and oratorios, two ballets, one song cycle, incidental music to several plays, more than 70 hymns and anthems, over 80 songs and parlour ballads, and a body of part songs, carols, and piano and chamber pieces. The operatic output spanned his whole career, as did that of his songs and religious music. The solo piano and chamber pieces are mostly from his early years, and are generally in a Mendelssohnian style. With the exception of his Imperial March, composed for a royal occasion in 1893, the large-scale orchestral concert works also date from early in the composer's career.

=== Influences ===
Reviewers and scholars often cite Mendelssohn as the most important influence on Sullivan. The music for The Tempest and the Irish Symphony, among other works, was seen by contemporary writers as strikingly Mendelssohnian. Percy Young writes that Sullivan's early affection for Mendelssohn remained evident throughout his composing career. Hughes remarks that although Sullivan emulated Mendelssohn in certain ways he seldom "lapsed into those harmonic clichés which mar some of Mendelssohn's more sentimental effusions". When The Tempest music was first presented the Neue Zeitschrift für Musik identified Schumann as a stronger influence, and Benedict Taylor, writing in 2017, concurs. In a 2009 study Taylor adds Schubert as another major influence on Sullivan in his orchestral works, although "from the beginning ... there is the peculiar, intangible stamp of Sullivan emerging confidently". Meinhard Saremba notes that from Sullivan's first meeting with Rossini in Paris, in 1862, Rossini's output became a model for Sullivan's comic opera music, "as evidenced in several rhythmic patterns and constructions of long finales".

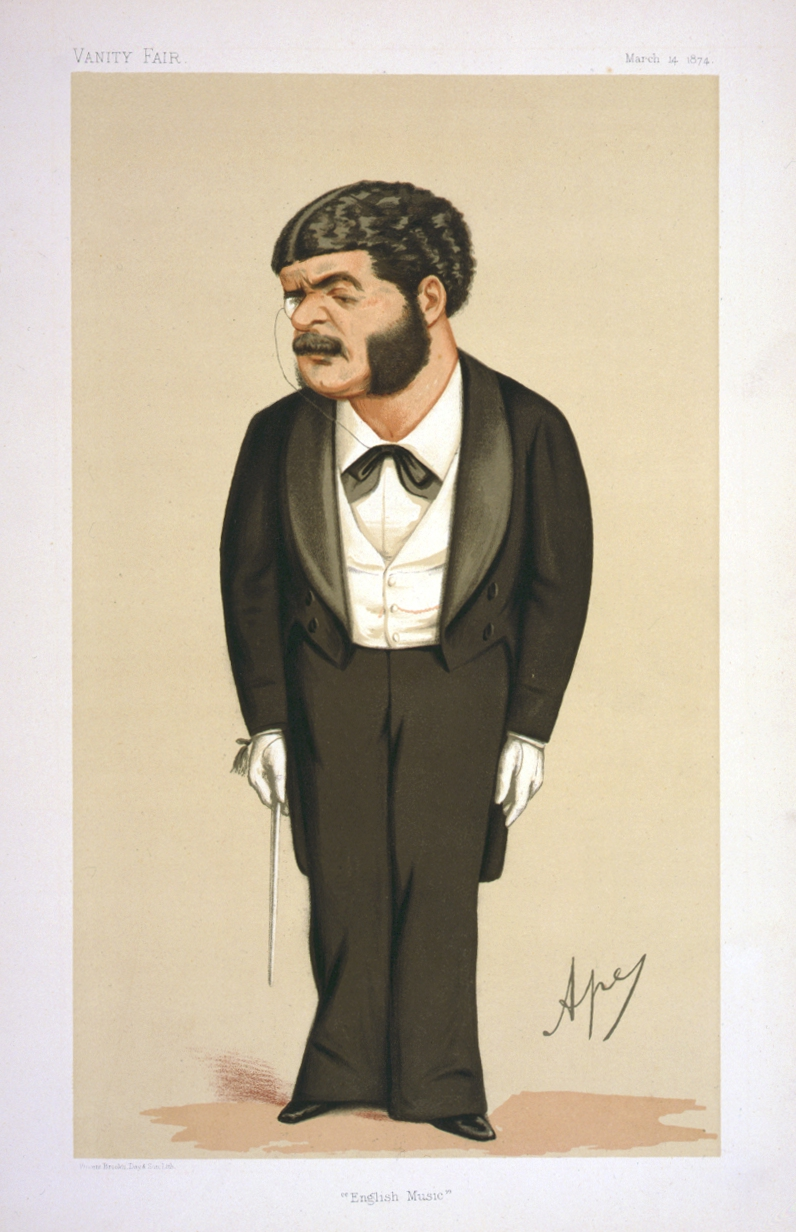
Sullivan by the cartoonist "Ape", 1874

As a young man, Sullivan's conservative musical education led him to follow in the conventions of his predecessors. Later he became more adventurous; Richard Silverman, writing in 2009, points to the influence of Liszt in later works – a harmonic ambiguity and chromaticism – so that by the time of The Golden Legend Sullivan had abandoned a home key altogether for the prelude. Sullivan disliked much of Wagner's Musikdrama, but he modelled the overture to The Yeomen of the Guard on the prelude of Die Meistersinger, which he described as "the greatest comic opera ever written". Saremba writes that in works from his middle and later years, Sullivan was inspired by Verdi's example both in details of orchestration, and in la tinta musical – the individual musical character of a piece – ranging from the "nautical air of H.M.S Pinafore" to "the swift Mediterranean lightness of The Gondoliers" and "the bleakness of Torquilstone in Ivanhoe".

=== Method of composition and text setting ===
Sullivan told an interviewer, Arthur Lawrence, "I don't use the piano in composition – that would limit me terribly". Sullivan explained that his process was not to wait for inspiration, but "to dig for it. ... I decide on [the rhythm] before I come to the question of melody. ... I mark out the metre in dots and dashes, and not until I have quite settled on the rhythm do I proceed to actual notation." Sullivan's text setting, compared with that of his nineteenth-century English predecessors or his European contemporaries, was "vastly more sensitive. ... Sullivan's operatic style attempts to create for itself a uniquely English text-music synthesis", and, in addition, by adopting a conservative musical style, he was able to achieve "the clarity to match Gilbert's finely honed wit with musical wit of his own".

In composing the Savoy operas, Sullivan wrote the vocal lines of the musical numbers first, and these were given to the actors. He, or an assistant, improvised a piano accompaniment at the early rehearsals; he wrote the orchestrations later, after he had seen what Gilbert's stage business would be. He left the overtures until last and sometimes delegated their composition, based on his outlines, to his assistants, often adding his suggestions or corrections. Those Sullivan wrote himself include Thespis, Iolanthe, Princess Ida, The Yeomen of the Guard, The Gondoliers, The Grand Duke and probably Utopia, Limited. Most of the overtures are structured as a pot-pourri of tunes from the operas in three sections: fast, slow and fast. Those for Iolanthe and The Yeomen of the Guard are written in a modified sonata form.

=== Melody and rhythm ===
The Musical Times noted that Sullivan's tunes, at least in the comic operas, appeal to the professional as much as to the layman: his continental contemporaries such as Saint-Saëns and the Viennese critic Eduard Hanslick held the Savoy operas in high regard. Hughes writes, "When Sullivan wrote what we call 'a good tune' it was nearly always 'good music' as well. Outside the ranks of the giants there are few other composers of whom the same could be said." Although his melodies sprang from rhythm, some of his themes may have been prompted by his chosen instrumentation or his harmonic techniques.

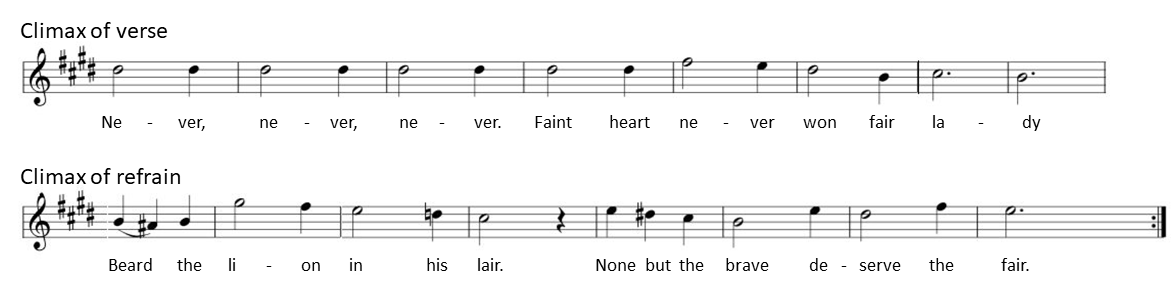
Climaxes of verse and refrain of "If You Go In" (Iolanthe)

In the comic operas, where many numbers are in verse-plus-refrain form, Sullivan shaped his melodies to provide a climax for the verse, capped by an overall climax in the refrain. Hughes cites "If you go in" (Iolanthe) as an example. He adds that Sullivan rarely reached the same class of excellence in instrumental works, where he had no librettist to feed his imagination. Even with Gilbert, on those occasions when the librettist wrote in unvaried metre, Sullivan often followed suit and produced phrases of simple repetition, such as in "Love Is a Plaintive Song" (Patience) and "A Man Who Would Woo a Fair Maid" (The Yeomen of the Guard).

Sullivan preferred to write in major keys, overwhelmingly in the Savoy operas, and even in his serious works. Examples of his rare excursions into minor keys include the long E minor melody in the first movement of the Irish Symphony, "Go Away, Madam" in the Act I finale of Iolanthe (echoing Verdi and Beethoven) and the execution march in the Act I finale of The Yeomen of the Guard.

=== Harmony and counterpoint ===
Sullivan was trained in the classical style, and contemporary music did not greatly attract him. Harmonically his early works used the conventional formulae of early 19th-century composers including Mendelssohn, Auber, Donizetti, Balfe and Schubert. Hughes comments that harmonic contrast in the Savoy works is enhanced by Sullivan's characteristic modulation between keys, as in "Expressive Glances" (Princess Ida), where he negotiates smoothly E major, C♯ minor and C major, or "Then One of Us will Be a Queen" (The Gondoliers), where he writes in F major, D♭ major and D minor.

When reproached for using consecutive fifths in Cox and Box, Sullivan replied "if 5ths turn up it doesn't matter, so long as there is no offence to the ear." Both Hughes and Jacobs in Grove's Dictionary of Music and Musicians comment adversely on Sullivan's overuse of tonic pedals, usually in the bass, which Hughes attributes to "lack of enterprise or even downright laziness". Another Sullivan trademark criticised by Hughes is the repeated use of the chord of the augmented fourth at moments of pathos. In his serious works, Sullivan attempted to avoid harmonic devices associated with the Savoy operas, with the result, according to Hughes, that The Golden Legend is a "hotch-potch of harmonic styles".

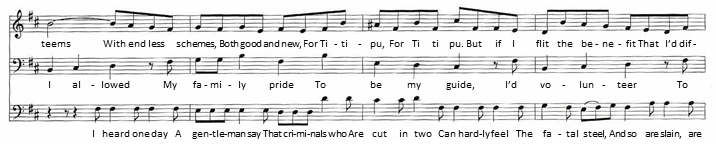
Characteristic "counterpoint of characters" from The Mikado, Act 1

One of Sullivan's best-known devices is what Jacobs terms his "'counterpoint of characters': the presentation by different personages of two seemingly independent tunes which later come together" simultaneously. He was not the first composer to combine themes in this way, (Note: An earlier exponent of the device was Hector Berlioz, who called it the réunion de deux thèmes. The article on Berlioz in Grove cites examples including the finale of the Symphonie fantastique, where the "witches' sabbath" theme is combined with the Dies irae.) but in Jacobs's phrase it became almost "the trademark of Sullivan's operetta style". Sometimes the melodies were for solo voices, as in "I Am So Proud" (The Mikado), which combines three melodic lines. Other examples are in choruses, where typically a graceful tune for the women is combined with a robust one for the men. Examples include "When the Foeman Bares his Steel" (The Pirates of Penzance), "In a Doleful Train" (Patience) and "Welcome, Gentry" (Ruddigore). In "How Beautifully Blue the Sky" (The Pirates of Penzance), one theme is given to the chorus (in 2/4 time) and the other to solo voices (in 3/4).

Sullivan rarely composed fugues. Examples are from the "Epilogue" to The Golden Legend and Victoria and Merrie England. In the Savoy operas, fugal style is reserved for making fun of legal solemnity in Trial by Jury and Iolanthe (e.g., the Lord Chancellor's leitmotif in the latter). Less formal counterpoint is employed in numbers such as "Brightly Dawns Our Wedding Day" (The Mikado) and "When the Buds Are Blossoming" (Ruddigore).

=== Orchestration ===
Hughes concludes his chapter on Sullivan's orchestration: "[I]n this vitally important sector of the composer's art he deserves to rank as a master." Sullivan was a competent player of at least four orchestral instruments (flute, clarinet, trumpet and trombone) and technically a most skilful orchestrator. (Note: Sullivan could also play the oboe and bassoon, but less proficiently.) Though sometimes inclined to indulge in grandiosity when writing for a full symphony orchestra, he was adept in using smaller forces to the maximum effect. Young writes that orchestral players generally like playing Sullivan's music: "Sullivan never asked his players to do what was either uncongenial or impracticable."

Overture di Ballo
The Overture di Ballo (1870) is regarded as Sullivan's most successful orchestral work. This military band arrangement is performed by the U.S. Marine Band.

Sullivan's orchestra for the Savoy operas was typical of the theatre orchestra of his era: 2 flutes (+ piccolo), oboe, 2 clarinets, bassoon, 2 horns, 2 cornets, 2 trombones, timpani, percussion and strings. According to Geoffrey Toye, the number of players in Sullivan's Savoy Theatre orchestras was a "minimum" of 31. Sullivan argued hard for an increase in the pit orchestra's size, and, starting with The Yeomen of the Guard, the orchestra was augmented with a second bassoon and a second tenor trombone. He generally orchestrated each score at almost the last moment, noting that the accompaniment for an opera had to wait until he saw the staging, so that he could judge how heavily or lightly to orchestrate each part of the music. For his large-scale orchestral pieces, which often employed very large forces, Sullivan added a second oboe part, sometimes double bassoon and bass clarinet, more horns, trumpets, tuba, and occasionally an organ and/or a harp.

One of the most recognisable features in Sullivan's orchestration is his woodwind scoring. Hughes especially notes Sullivan's clarinet writing, exploiting all registers and colours of the instrument, and his particular fondness for oboe solos. For instance, the Irish Symphony contains two long solo oboe passages in succession, and in the Savoy operas there are many shorter examples. In the operas, and also in concert works, another characteristic Sullivan touch is his fondness for pizzicato passages for the string sections. Hughes instances "Kind Sir, You Cannot Have the Heart" (The Gondoliers), "Free From his Fetters Grim" (The Yeomen of the Guard) and "In Vain to Us You Plead" (Iolanthe).

=== Musical quotations and parodies ===
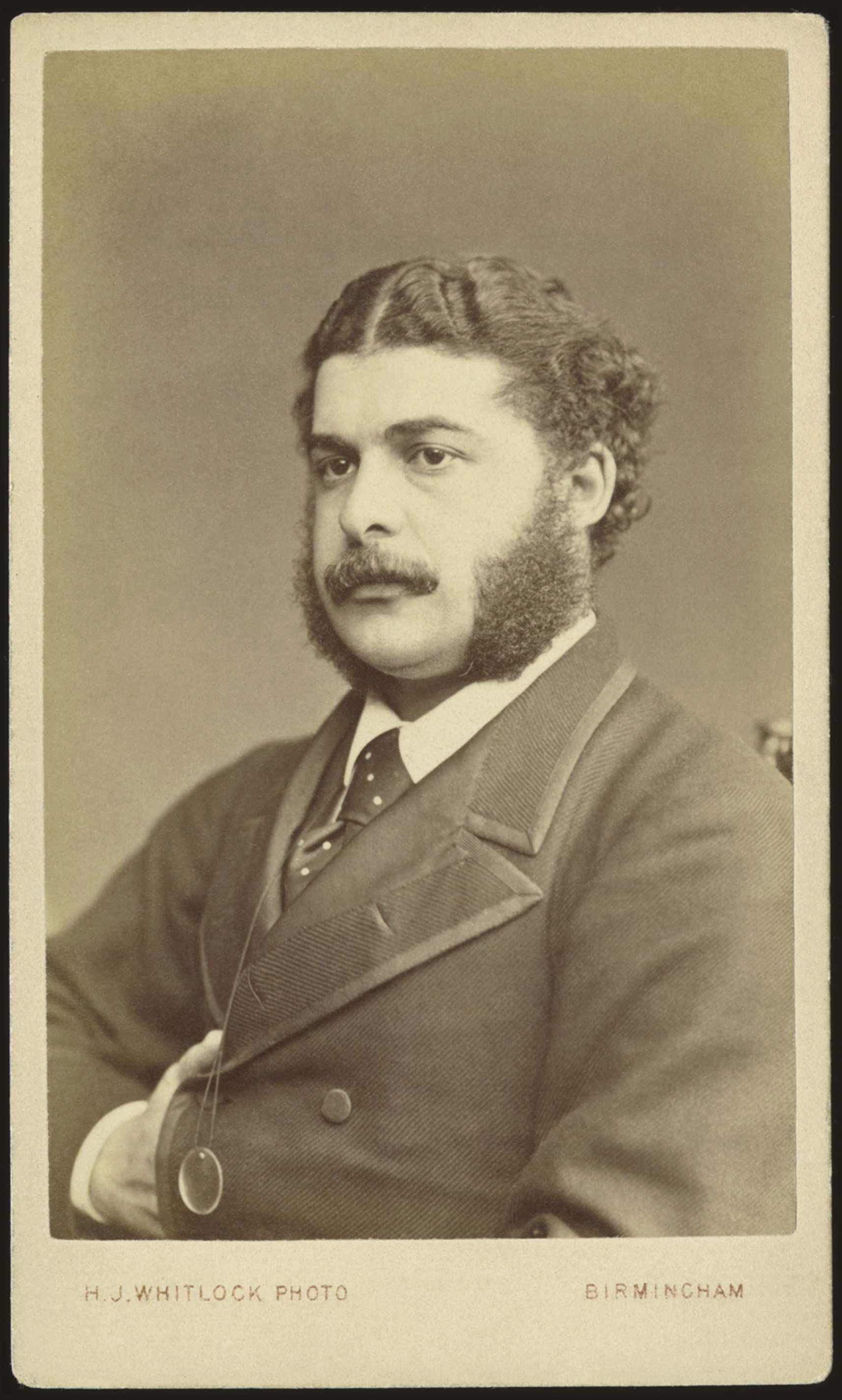
Sullivan in about 1870

Throughout the Savoy operas, and occasionally in other works, Sullivan quotes or imitates well-known themes or parodies the styles of famous composers. On occasion he may have echoed his predecessors unconsciously: Hughes cites a Handelian influence in "Hereupon We're Both Agreed" (The Yeomen of the Guard), and Rodney Milnes called "Sighing Softly" in The Pirates of Penzance "a song plainly inspired by – and indeed worthy of – Sullivan's hero, Schubert". Edward Greenfield found a theme in the slow movement of the Irish Symphony "an outrageous crib" from Schubert's Unfinished Symphony. In early pieces, Sullivan drew on Mendelssohn's style in his music for The Tempest, Auber's in his Henry VIII music and Gounod's in The Light of the World. The influence of Mendelssohn pervades the fairy music in Iolanthe. The Golden Legend shows the influence of Liszt and Wagner.

Sullivan adopted traditional musical forms, such as madrigals in The Mikado, Ruddigore and The Yeomen of the Guard and glees in H.M.S. Pinafore and The Mikado, and the Venetian barcarolle in The Gondoliers. He made use of dance styles to enhance the sense of time or place in various scenes: gavottes in Ruddigore and The Gondoliers; a country dance in The Sorcerer; a nautical hornpipe in Ruddigore; and the Spanish cachucha and Italian saltarello and tarantella in The Gondoliers. Occasionally he drew on influences from further afield. In The Mikado, he used an old Japanese war song, and his 1882 trip to Egypt inspired musical styles in his later opera The Rose of Persia.

Elsewhere, Sullivan wrote undisguised parody. Of the sextet "I Hear the Soft Note" in Patience, he said to the singers, "I think you will like this. It is Dr Arne and Purcell at their best." In his comic operas, he followed Offenbach's lead in lampooning the idioms of French and Italian opera, such as those of Donizetti, Bellini and Verdi. Examples of his operatic parody include Mabel's aria "Poor Wand'ring One" in The Pirates of Penzance, the duet "Who Are You, Sir?" from Cox and Box, and the whispered plans for elopement in "This Very Night" in H.M.S. Pinafore, parodying the conspirators' choruses in Verdi's Il trovatore and Rigoletto. The mock-jingoistic "He Is an Englishman" in H.M.S. Pinafore and choral passages in The Zoo satirise patriotic British tunes such as Arne's "Rule, Britannia!". The chorus "With Catlike Tread" from The Pirates parodies Verdi's "Anvil Chorus" from Il trovatore.

Hughes calls Bouncer's song in Cox and Box "a jolly Handelian parody" and notes a strong Handelian flavour to Arac's song in Act III of Princess Ida. In "A More Humane Mikado", at the words "Bach interwoven with Spohr and Beethoven", the clarinet and bassoon quote the fugue subject of Bach's Fantasia and Fugue in G minor. Sullivan sometimes used Wagnerian leitmotifs for both comic and dramatic effect. In Iolanthe, a distinctive four-note theme is associated with the title character, the Lord Chancellor has a fugal motif, and the Fairy Queen's music parodies that of Wagner heroines such as Brünnhilde. In The Yeomen of the Guard the Tower of London is evoked by its own motif. This use of the leitmotif technique is repeated and developed further in Ivanhoe.

== Reputation and criticism ==
=== Early reception ===
Sullivan's critical reputation has undergone extreme changes since the 1860s when critics, struck by his potential, hailed him as the long-awaited great English composer. His incidental music to The Tempest was received with acclaim at the Crystal Palace, just before his 20th birthday, in April 1862. The Athenaeum commented:

It ... may mark an epoch in English music, or we shall be greatly disappointed. Years on years have elapsed since we have heard a work by so young an artist so full of promise, so full of fancy, showing so much conscientiousness, so much skill, and so few references to any model elect.

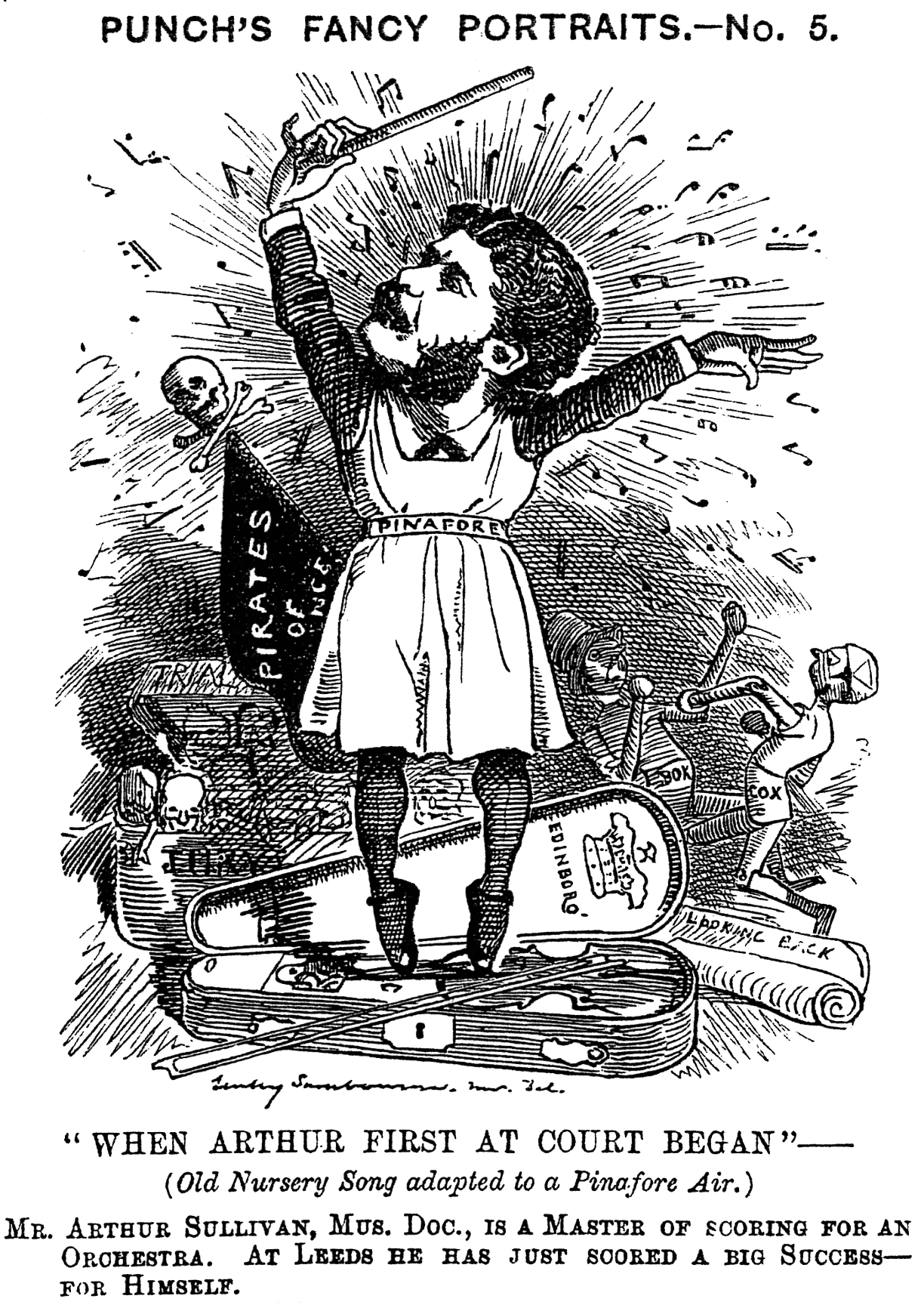
Cartoon from Punch (1880) (Note: The cartoon was accompanied by a parody of "When I, good friends" from Trial by Jury that summarised Sullivan's career to that date. It prematurely carried a caption stating "It is reported that after the Leeds Festival Dr. Sullivan will be knighted" and was accompanied by a punny parody version of "When I, good friends" from Trial by Jury that summarised Sullivan's career to that date.)

His Irish Symphony of 1866 won similarly enthusiastic praise, but as Arthur Jacobs notes, "The first rapturous outburst of enthusiasm for Sullivan as an orchestral composer did not last." A comment typical of those that followed him throughout his career was that "Sullivan's unquestionable talent should make him doubly careful not to mistake popular applause for artistic appreciation."

When Sullivan turned to comic opera with Gilbert, the serious critics began to express disapproval. The music critic Peter Gammond writes of "misapprehensions and prejudices, delivered to our door by the Victorian firm Musical Snobs Ltd. ... frivolity and high spirits were sincerely seen as elements that could not be exhibited by anyone who was to be admitted to the sanctified society of Art." As early as 1877 The London Figaro commented that Sullivan "wilfully throws his opportunity away. ... He possesses all the natural ability to have given us an English opera, and, instead, he affords us a little more-or-less excellent fooling." Few critics denied the excellence of Sullivan's theatre scores. The Theatre commented, "Iolanthe sustains Dr. Sullivan's reputation as the most spontaneous, fertile, and scholarly composer of comic opera this country has ever produced." (Note: Sullivan received honorary doctorates of music from the University of Cambridge in 1876, and Oxford in 1879.) Comic opera, no matter how skilfully crafted, was viewed as an intrinsically lower form of art than oratorio. The Athenaeum's review of The Martyr of Antioch declared: "[I]t is an advantage to have the composer of H.M.S. Pinafore occupying himself with a worthier form of art."

=== Knighthood and later years ===
Sullivan's knighthood in 1883 gave the serious music critics further ammunition. The Musical Review of that year observed:

[S]ome things that Mr. Arthur Sullivan may do, Sir Arthur ought not to do. In other words, it will look rather more than odd to see announced in the papers that a new comic opera is in preparation, the book by Mr. W. S. Gilbert and the music by Sir Arthur Sullivan. A musical knight can hardly write shop ballads either; he must not dare to soil his hands with anything less than an anthem or a madrigal; oratorio, in which he has so conspicuously shone, and symphony, must now be his line. Here is not only an opportunity, but a positive obligation for him to return to the sphere from which he has too long descended [and] do battle for the honour of English art ... against all foreign rivals, and arouse us thoroughly from our present half-torpid condition.

Even Sullivan's friend George Grove wrote: "Surely the time has come when so able and experienced a master of voice, orchestra, and stage effect – master, too, of so much genuine sentiment – may apply his gifts to a serious opera on some subject of abiding human or natural interest." Sullivan finally redeemed himself in critical eyes with The Golden Legend in 1886. The Observer hailed it as a "triumph of English art". The World called it "one of the greatest creations we have had for many years. Original, bold, inspired, grand in conception, in execution, in treatment, it is a composition which will make an 'epoch' and which will carry the name of its composer higher on the wings of fame and glory. ... The effect of the public performance was unprecedented."

Hopes for a new departure were expressed in The Daily Telegraph's review of The Yeomen of the Guard (1888), Sullivan's most serious opera to that point: "[T]he music follows the book to a higher plane, and we have a genuine English opera, forerunner of many others, let us hope, and possibly significant of an advance towards a national lyric stage." Sullivan's only grand opera, Ivanhoe (1891), received generally favourable reviews, although J. A. Fuller Maitland, in The Times, expressed reservations, writing that the opera's "best portions rise so far above anything else that Sir Arthur Sullivan has given to the world, and have such force and dignity, that it is not difficult to forget the drawbacks which may be found in the want of interest in much of the choral writing, and the brevity of the concerted solo parts." Sullivan's 1897 ballet Victoria and Merrie England was one of several late pieces that won praise from most critics:

Sir Arthur Sullivan's music is music for the people. There is no attempt made to force on the public the dullness of academic experience. The melodies are all as fresh as last year's wine, and as exhilarating as sparkling champagne. There is not one tune which tires the hearing, and in the matter of orchestration our only humorist has let himself run riot, not being handicapped with libretto, and the gain is enormous. ... All through we have orchestration of infinite delicacy, tunes of alarming simplicity, but never a tinge of vulgarity.

Although some members of the musical establishment disapproved of Sullivan writing music that was both comic and accessible, he was, nevertheless, "the nation's de facto composer laureate". (Note: Gian Andrea Mazzucato wrote this summary of Sullivan's career in The Musical Standard of 16 December 1899: "[T]he English history of the 19th century could not record the name of a man whose 'life work' is more worthy of honour, study and admiration than the name of Sir Arthur Sullivan ... it is a debatable point whether the universal history of music can point to any musical personality since the days of Haydn, Mozart and Beethoven, whose influence is likely to be more lasting than the influence the great Englishman is slowly, but surely, exerting. ... I make no doubt that when ... Sullivan's life and works have become known on the continent, he will, by unanimous consent, be classed among the epoch-making composers, the select few whose genius and strength of will empowered them to find and found a national school of music, that is, to endow their countrymen with the undefinable, yet positive means of evoking in a man's soul, by the magic of sound, those delicate nuances of feeling which are characteristic of the emotional power of each different race.") His obituary in The Times called him England's "most conspicuous composer ... the musician who had such power to charm all classes. ... The critic and the student found new beauties at every fresh hearing. What ... set Sullivan in popular esteem far above all the other English composers of his day was the tunefulness of his music, that quality in it by which ... [it] was immediately recognized as a joyous contribution to the gaiety of life. ... Sullivan's name stood as a synonym for music in England." (Note: The obituary also stated: "Many who are able to appreciate classical music regret that Sir Arthur Sullivan did not aim consistently at higher things, that he set himself to rival Offenbach and Lecocq instead of competing on a level of high seriousness with such musicians as Sir Hubert Parry and Professor Stanford. If he had followed this path, he might have enrolled his name among the great composers of all time. ... That Sir Arthur Sullivan could aim high and succeed he proved by The Golden Legend and by a good deal of Ivanhoe".)

=== Posthumous reputation ===
"Favorite airs from The Mikado"
A 1914 Edison Records recording of selections from The Mikado. Includes parts of the overture, "A Wand'ring Minstrel", "Three Little Maids", "Tit-willow" and the Act II finale.

In the decade after his death, Sullivan's reputation sank considerably among music critics. In 1901 Fuller Maitland took issue with the generally laudatory tone of the obituaries: "Is there anywhere a case quite parallel to that of Sir Arthur Sullivan, who began his career with a work which at once stamped him as a genius, and to the height of which he only rarely attained throughout life? ... It is because such great natural gifts – gifts greater, perhaps, than fell to any English musician since ... Purcell – were so very seldom employed in work worthy of them." Edward Elgar, to whom Sullivan had been particularly kind, rose to Sullivan's defence, branding Fuller Maitland's obituary "the shady side of musical criticism ... that foul unforgettable episode". (Note: Fuller Maitland was later discredited when it was shown that he had invented a banal lyric, passing it off as genuine and condemning Sullivan for supposedly setting such inanity. In 1929 Fuller Maitland admitted that he had been wrong in earlier years to dismiss Sullivan's comic operas as "ephemeral".)

20th-century audiences

Fuller Maitland's followers, including Ernest Walker, also dismissed Sullivan as "merely the idle singer of an empty evening". As late as 1966 Frank Howes, a music critic for The Times, condemned Sullivan for a "lack of sustained effort ... a fundamental lack of seriousness towards his art [and] inability to perceive the smugness, the sentimentality and banality of the Mendelssohnian detritus ... to remain content with the flattest and most obvious rhythms, this yielding to a fatal facility, that excludes Sullivan from the ranks of the good composers". Thomas Dunhill wrote in 1928 that Sullivan's "music has suffered in an extraordinary degree from the vigorous attacks which have been made upon it in professional circles. These attacks have succeeded in surrounding the composer with a kind of barricade of prejudice which must be swept away before justice can be done to his genius."

Sir Henry Wood continued to perform Sullivan's serious music. In 1942 Wood presented a Sullivan centenary concert at the Royal Albert Hall, but it was not until the 1960s that Sullivan's music other than the Savoy operas began to be widely revived. In 1960 Hughes published the first full-length book about Sullivan's music "which, while taking note of his weaknesses (which are many) and not hesitating to castigate his lapses from good taste (which were comparatively rare) [attempted] to view them in perspective against the wider background of his sound musicianship." The work of the Sir Arthur Sullivan Society, founded in 1977, and books about Sullivan by musicians such as Young (1971) and Jacobs (1986) contributed to the re-evaluation of Sullivan's serious music. The Irish Symphony had its first professional recording in 1968, and many of Sullivan's non-Gilbert works have since been recorded. Scholarly critical editions of an increasing number of Sullivan's works have been published.

In 1957 a review in The Times explained Sullivan's contributions to "the continued vitality of the Savoy operas": "Gilbert's lyrics ... take on extra point and sparkle when set to Sullivan's music. ... [Sullivan, too, is] a delicate wit, whose airs have a precision, a neatness, a grace, and a flowing melody". A 2000 article in The Musical Times by Nigel Burton noted the resurgence of Sullivan's reputation beyond the comic operas:

[Sullivan] spoke naturally to all people, for all time, of the passions, sorrows and joys which are forever rooted in the human consciousness. ... It is his artistic consistency in this respect which obliges us to pronounce him our greatest Victorian composer. Time has now sufficiently dispersed the mists of criticism for us to be able to see the truth, to enjoy all his music, and to rejoice in the rich diversity of its panoply. ... [L]et us resolve to set aside the "One-and-a-half-hurrahs" syndrome once and for all, and, in its place, raise THREE LOUD CHEERS.

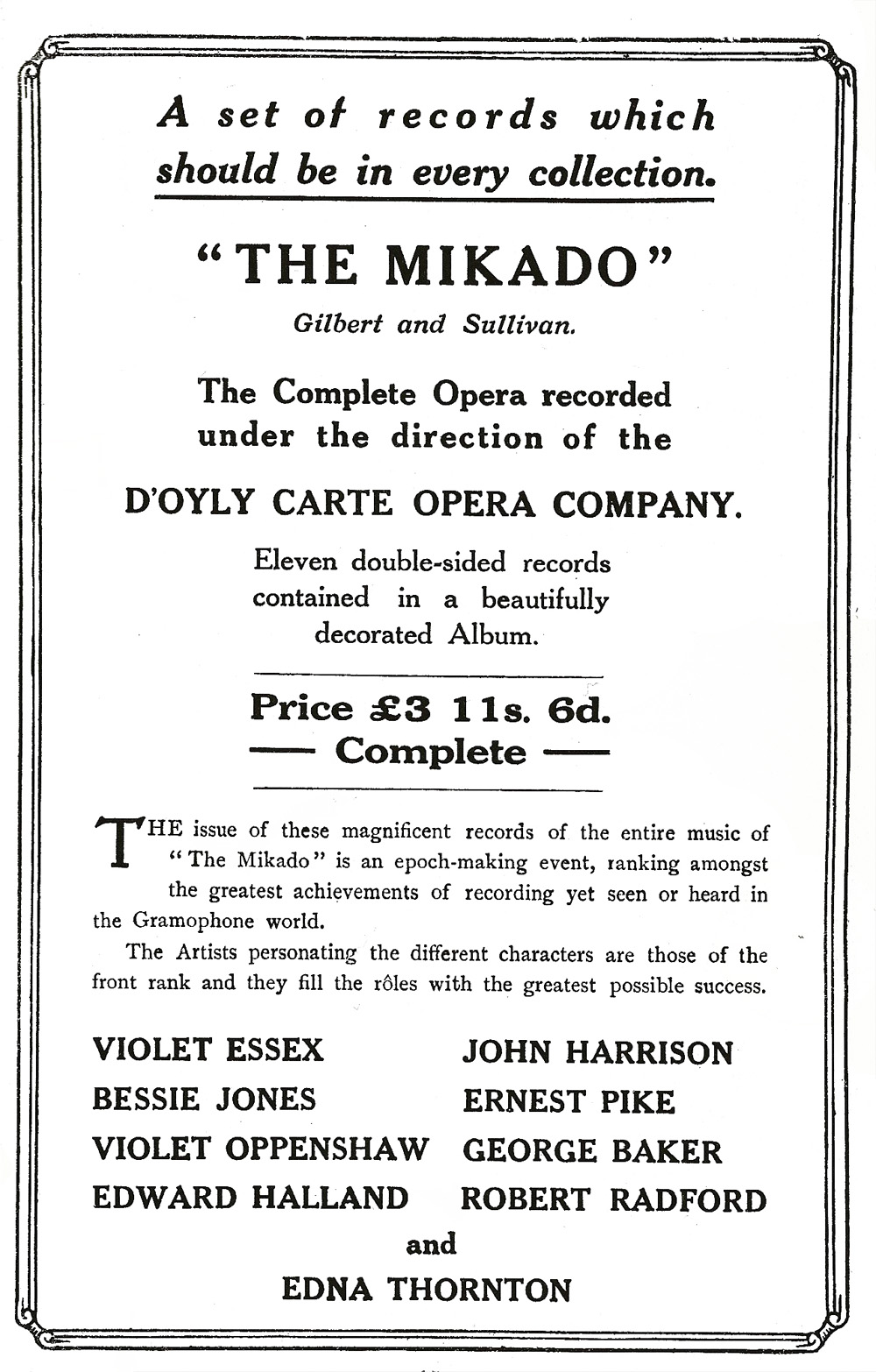
Advertisement for the first recording of The Mikado, 1917

== Recordings ==
On 14 August 1888 George Gouraud introduced Thomas Edison's phonograph to London in a press conference, including the playing of a piano and cornet recording of Sullivan's "The Lost Chord", one of the first recordings of music ever made. At a party on 5 October 1888 given to demonstrate the technology, Sullivan recorded a speech to be sent to Edison, saying, in part: "I am astonished and somewhat terrified at the result of this evening's experiments: astonished at the wonderful power you have developed, and terrified at the thought that so much hideous and bad music may be put on record forever. But all the same I think it is the most wonderful thing that I have ever experienced, and I congratulate you with all my heart on this wonderful discovery." These recordings were found in the Edison Library in New Jersey in the 1950s:

"The Lost Chord"
One of the recordings played at the press conference on 14 August 1888

After-dinner speech at the Little Menlo
Sullivan's phonographic letter to Thomas Edison, 5 October 1888

The first commercial recordings of Sullivan's music, beginning in 1898, were of individual numbers from the Savoy operas. (Note: The first was "Take a pair of sparkling eyes", from The Gondoliers.) In 1917 the Gramophone Company (HMV) produced the first album of a complete Gilbert and Sullivan opera, The Mikado, followed by eight more. Electrical recordings of most of the operas issued by HMV and Victor followed from the 1920s, supervised by Rupert D'Oyly Carte. The D'Oyly Carte Opera Company continued to produce recordings until 1979. After the copyrights expired, recordings were made by opera companies such as Gilbert and Sullivan for All and Australian Opera, and Sir Malcolm Sargent and Sir Charles Mackerras each conducted audio sets of several Savoy operas. Since 1994, the International Gilbert and Sullivan Festival has released professional and amateur CDs and videos of its productions and other Sullivan recordings, and Ohio Light Opera has recorded several of the operas in the 21st century.

Sullivan's non-Savoy works were infrequently recorded until the 1960s. A few of his songs were put on disc in the early years of the 20th century, including versions of "The Lost Chord" by Enrico Caruso and Clara Butt. The first of many recordings of the Overture di Ballo was made in 1932, conducted by Sargent. The Irish Symphony was first recorded in 1968 under Sir Charles Groves. Since then, much of Sullivan's serious music and his operas without Gilbert have been recorded, including the Cello Concerto by Julian Lloyd Webber (1986); and The Rose of Persia (1999); The Golden Legend (2001); Ivanhoe (2009); and The Masque at Kenilworth and On Shore and Sea (2014), conducted by, respectively, Tom Higgins, Ronald Corp, David Lloyd-Jones and Richard Bonynge. In 2017 Chandos Records released an album, Songs, which includes The Window and 35 individual Sullivan songs. Mackerras's Sullivan ballet, Pineapple Poll, has received many recordings since its first performance in 1951. In 2020 Dutton Epoch issued the first professional recording of Haddon Hall, with the BBC Concert Orchestra and BBC Singers conducted by John Andrews.

== See also ==
- List of compositions by Arthur Sullivan
- People associated with Gilbert and Sullivan

== Notes and references ==
=== Sources ===
- Ainger, Michael (2002). Gilbert and Sullivan – A Dual Biography. Oxford: Oxford University Press. ISBN 978-0-19-514769-8.
- Allen, Reginald (1976). The First Night Gilbert and Sullivan. London: Chappell. ISBN 978-0-903443-10-4.
- Bradley, Ian C (2005). Oh Joy! Oh Rapture! The Enduring Phenomenon of Gilbert and Sullivan. Oxford and New York: Oxford University Press. ISBN 978-0-19-516700-9.
- Crowther, Andrew (2000). Contradiction Contradicted – The Plays of W. S. Gilbert. London and Madison, New Jersey: Associated University Presses and Fairleigh Dickinson University Press. ISBN 978-0-8386-3839-2.
- Crowther, Andrew (2011). Gilbert of Gilbert & Sullivan: his Life and Character. London: The History Press. ISBN 978-0-7524-5589-1.
- Dailey, Jeff S. (2008). Sir Arthur Sullivan's Grand Opera Ivanhoe and its Theatrical and Musical Precursors. Lewiston, New York: Edwin Mellen Press. ISBN 978-0-7734-5068-4.
- Dunhill, Thomas (1928). Sullivan's Comic Operas – A Critical Appreciation. London: Edward Arnold. OCLC 409499.
- Eden, David; Meinhard Saremba (2009). The Cambridge Companion to Gilbert and Sullivan. Cambridge Companions to Music. Cambridge: Cambridge University Press. ISBN 978-0-521-88849-3.
- Farrell, Scott (2009). The C. H. Workman Productions: A Centenary Review of the Final Savoy Operas. Loves Park: Scott Farrell. ISBN 978-1-257-34089-7.
- Findon, Benjamin William (1904). Sir Arthur Sullivan – His Life and Music. London: James Nisbet. OCLC 499660152.
- Fitz-Gerald, S. J. Adair (1924). The Story of the Savoy Opera. London: Stanley Paul & Co. OCLC 711957498.
- Fitzsimons, Bob (2008). Arthur O'Leary & Arthur Sullivan: Musical Journeys from Kerry to the Heart of Victorian England. Tralee: Doghouse. ISBN 978-0-9558746-1-1.
- Gammond, Peter (1980). Offenbach. London: Omnibus Press. ISBN 978-0-7119-0257-2.
- Gaye, Freda, ed. (1967). Who's Who in the Theatre (fourteenth ed.). London: Sir Isaac Pitman and Sons. OCLC 5997224.
- Goodman, Andrew (1988). Gilbert and Sullivan's London. Tunbridge Wells: Spellmount. ISBN 978-0-946771-31-8.
- Hanslick, Eduard (1988) [1950]. Hanslick's Music Criticisms. Henry Pleasants (ed and trans). New York: Dover. ISBN 978-0-486-25739-6.
- Harding, James (1965). Saint-Saëns and his Circle. London: Chapman and Hall. OCLC 60222627.
- Harris, Roger, ed. (1986). The Golden Legend. Chorleywood: R Clyde. OCLC 16794345.
- Hayes, Scott (2003). Uncle Arthur: The California Connection. Saffron Walden: Sir Arthur Sullivan Society. OCLC 52232815.
- Howes, Frank (1966). The English Musical Renaissance. London: Secker and Warburg. OCLC 460655985.
- Hughes, Gervase (1959). The Music of Sir Arthur Sullivan. London: Macmillan. OCLC 500626743.
- Jacobs, Arthur (1984). Arthur Sullivan: A Victorian Musician. Oxford and New York: Oxford University Press. ISBN 978-0-19-315443-8.
- Klein, Herman (1903). Thirty Years of Musical Life in London, 1870–1900. London: Heinemann. OCLC 5346607.
- Kreissle von Hellborn, Heinrich (1869). The Life of Franz Schubert. Vol. 2. Translated by Arthur Duke Coleridge. Appendix by George Grove. Longmans, Green, and Co.
- Lawrence, Arthur (1899). Sir Arthur Sullivan, Life Story, Letters and Reminiscences (1907 ed.). London: Duffield. OCLC 1303888.
- Lycett, Andrew (2000). Rudyard Kipling. London: Phoenix. ISBN 978-0-7538-1085-9.
- Musgrave, Michael (1995). The Musical Life of the Crystal Palace. Cambridge: Cambridge University Press. ISBN 978-0-521-37562-7.
- Palmer, Fiona M. (2017). Conductors in Britain 1870–1914: Wielding the Baton at the Height of Empire. Woodbridge, Suffolk: Boydell and Brewer. ISBN 978-1-783-27145-0.
- Rees, Terence (1964). Thespis – A Gilbert & Sullivan Enigma. London: Dillon's University Bookshop. OCLC 220047638.
- Rodmell, Paul (2017). Charles Villiers Stanford. London: Routledge. ISBN 978-1-138-26903-3.
- Rollins, Cyril; R. John Witts (1961). The D'Oyly Carte Opera Company in Gilbert and Sullivan Operas. London: Michael Joseph, Ltd. OCLC 1317843.
- Rust, Brian (1975). Gramophone Records of the First World War: An HMV Catalogue 1914–18. Newton Abbot: David and Charles. ISBN 978-0-7153-6842-8.
- Shaw, Bernard (1981). Dan Laurence (ed.). Shaw's Music: The Complete Music Criticism of Bernard Shaw, Volume 1 (1876–1890). London: The Bodley Head. ISBN 978-0-370-30247-8.
- Shaw, Bernard (1981). Dan Laurence (ed.). Shaw's Music: The Complete Music Criticism of Bernard Shaw, Volume 2 (1890–1893). London: The Bodley Head. ISBN 978-0-370-31271-2.
- Stanford, Charles Villiers (1908). Studies and Memories. London: Constable. OCLC 238881659.
- Stedman, Jane W. (1996). W. S. Gilbert, A Classic Victorian & His Theatre. Oxford and New York: Oxford University Press. ISBN 978-0-19-816174-5.
- Taylor, Benedict (2017). Arthur Sullivan: A Musical Reappraisal. Abingdon and New York: Routledge. ISBN 978-1-4094-6910-0.
- Tillett, Selwyn (1998). The Ballets of Arthur Sullivan. Coventry: Sir Arthur Sullivan Society. OCLC 227181926.
- Williams, Carolyn (2010). Gilbert and Sullivan: Gender, Genre, Parody. New York: Columbia University Press. ISBN 978-0-231-14804-7.
- Wolfson, John (1984). Sullivan and the Scott Russells: A Victorian love affair told through the letters of Rachel and Louise Scott Russell to Arthur Sullivan, 1864–1870. Chichester: Packard Publishing. ISBN 978-0-906527-14-6.
- Young, Percy M. (1971). Sir Arthur Sullivan. London: J. M. Dent & Sons. ISBN 978-0-460-03934-5.
