= 1887 in the United Kingdom =

Events from the year 1887 in the United Kingdom. This year was the Golden Jubilee of Queen Victoria.

== Incumbents ==
- Monarch – Victoria
- Prime Minister – Robert Gascoyne-Cecil, 3rd Marquess of Salisbury (Conservative)

== Events ==
- 12 January – Stafford Northcote, 1st Earl of Iddesleigh, while waiting to discuss his resignation from the office of Secretary of State for Foreign Affairs, dies at 10 Downing Street.
- 20 January – Emigrant ship Kapunda sinks after a collision off the coast of Brazil, killing 303 with only 16 survivors.
- 18 February – National Colliery disaster at Cwtch in the Rhondda: an underground explosion kills thirty miners.
- 7 March–18 April – The Times publishes a series of articles on "Parnellism and Crime" quoting letters, subsequently confessed to be forgeries, intended to discredit Charles Stewart Parnell by appearing to show him as implicated in illegal activities, in particular, support for the 1882 Phoenix Park Murders.
- 28 March – Irish Crimes Act suspends trial by jury in Ireland.
- 31 March – St. John Ambulance Brigade formed.
- 3 May – Royal Jubilee Exhibition, Manchester, is opened by Princess Alexandra.
- 9 May – Buffalo Bill's Wild West Show opens in London.
- 11 May – First female victim of the Thames Torso Murders found.
- 28 May – Udston mining disaster in Hamilton, South Lanarkshire, Scotland: 73 coal miners die in a firedamp explosion at Udston Colliery.
- 17 June – Hammersmith Bridge opens in London.
- 20 June – Jubilee coinage first issued, including the only issue of a double florin.
- 20–21 June – Queen Victoria and the country celebrate a Golden Jubilee, the 50th year of her reign.
- 21 June – Jubilee Plot: Clan na Gael supporters land in Britain from the United States to commit terrorist offences.
- 22 June – Zululand becomes a British colony.
- 26 July — Blackpool F.C. founded.
- 5 September – Theatre Royal, Exeter burns down, and 186 people die.
- 1 October – British Empire takes over Balochistan.
- 6 October – the Hōvis process for manufacture of breadmaking flour is patented.
- 6 November – the Association football club Celtic F.C. is formed in Glasgow by Irish Marist Brother Walfrid to help alleviate poverty in the city's East End by raising money for his charity, the Poor Children's Dinner Table.
- 11 November – construction of the Manchester Ship Canal begins.
- 13 November – Bloody Sunday: Police in London clash with radical and Irish nationalist protesters.
- 17 December – English adventurer Thomas Stevens concludes the first circumnavigation by bicycle in Yokohama, having set out on his penny-farthing from San Francisco in 1884.
- 25 December – Glenfiddich single malt Scotch whisky first distilled.

=== Undated ===
- The Hospitals Association establishes the first (non-statutory and voluntary) register of nurses in the UK.
- Sir John Everett Millais' painting Bubbles is acquired for advertising purposes by Pears soap.

== Publications ==
- Arthur Conan Doyle's first Sherlock Holmes novel A Study in Scarlet (in Beeton's Christmas Annual, November).
- H. Rider Haggard's novels She and Allan Quatermain.
- Thomas Hardy's novel The Woodlanders.

== Births ==
- 10 February – E. V. Rieu, classicist and poet (died 1972)
- 5 March – Herbert Farjeon, man of the theatre (died 1945)
- 9 March – Phil Mead, cricketer (died 1958)
- 1 May – Alan Cunningham, World War II general (died 1983)
- 5 May – Geoffrey Fisher, Archbishop of Canterbury (died 1972)
- 24 May – Mick Mannock, World War I flying ace (killed in action 1918)
- 4 June – Ray Strachey, born Rachel Costelloe, feminist campaigner (died 1940)
- 21 June – Hastings Ismay, army officer (died 1965)
- 22 June – Julian Huxley, biologist (died 1975)
- 29 July – William Graham, Scottish politician (died 1932)
- 3 August – Rupert Brooke, war poet (died 1915)
- 16 August – Hugh Dalton, politician (died 1962)
- 22 August – Walter Citrine, trade unionist (died 1983)
- 31 August – William McMillan, sculptor (died 1977)
- 7 September – Edith Sitwell, poet (died 1964)
- 26 September – Edwin Keppel Bennett, writer (died 1958)
- 26 September – Barnes Wallis, scientist, engineer and inventor (died 1979)
- 11 October – Henry Montgomery Campbell, Bishop of London (died 1970)
- 1 November – L. S. Lowry, painter (died 1976)
- 11 November – Maurice Elvey, born William Folkard, film director (died 1967)
- 17 November – Bernard Montgomery, World War II commander (died 1976)
- 23 November – Boris Karloff, born William Pratt, film actor (died 1969)
- Isabel Emslie Hutton, Scottish nurse in Serbia during World War I and psychiatrist (died 1960)

== Deaths ==
- 12 January – Stafford Northcote, 1st Earl of Iddesleigh, politician (born 1818)
- 22 January – Sir Joseph Whitworth, mechanical engineer (born 1803)
- 10 February – Mrs Henry Wood, novelist (born 1814)
- 13 February – Philip Bourke Marston, poet (born 1850)
- 4 March – Mrs W. H. Foley, actor, singer, director and manager (born 1821)
- 23 April – John Ceiriog Hughes, Welsh poet (born 1832)
- 7 May – Samuel Cousins, engraver (born 1801)
- 8 May – Thomas Stevenson, Scottish lighthouse engineer and meteorologist (born 1818)
- 21 May – Sir Horace Jones, architect (born 1819)
- 10 June – Richard Lindon, inventor (born 1816)
- 8 July – John Wright Oakes, landscape painter (born 1820)
- 25 July – Henry Mayhew, writer (born 1812)
- 16 August – Webster Paulson, civil engineer (born 1837)
- 12 October – Dinah Craik, novelist and poet (born 1826)
- 5 December – Richard Lyons, 1st Viscount Lyons, diplomat (born 1817)
- 14 December – William Garrow Lettsom, diplomat, mineralogist and spectroscopist (born 1805)
- 23 December – Adolphus Frederick Alexander Woodford, parson (born 1821)
