= The Zoo =

Comic opera by Arthur Sullivan and B.C Stephenson

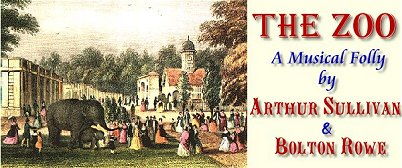

The Zoo is a one-act comic opera, with music by Arthur Sullivan and a libretto by B. C. Stephenson, writing under the pen name of Bolton Rowe. It premiered on 5 June 1875 at the St James's Theatre in London (as an afterpiece to W. S. Gilbert's Tom Cobb), concluding its run five weeks later, on 10 July 1875, at the Haymarket Theatre. There were brief revivals in late 1875, and again in 1879, before the opera was shelved.

The farcical story concerns two pairs of lovers. First, a nobleman, who goes to the zoo to woo the girl who sells snacks there. He tries to impress her by buying and eating all of the food. The other couple is a young chemist who believes that he has poisoned his beloved by mixing up her father's prescription with peppermint that he had meant for her.

The score was not published in Sullivan's lifetime, and the whereabouts of the composer's autograph score were not publicly known until Terence Rees purchased it at auction in 1966 and arranged for publication. The opera is in one act without spoken dialogue, running about 40 minutes. Like Trial by Jury and Cox and Box, it has been staged as a curtain-raiser to the shorter Gilbert and Sullivan operas. Triple-bills of Sullivan's three one-act operas have also proved successful.

== Background ==
=== Genesis of the work ===
How Sullivan came to collaborate with Stephenson is uncertain. Just ten weeks before The Zoo opened, Trial by Jury premiered at the Royalty Theatre, with a libretto by Sullivan's more famous collaborator, W. S. Gilbert. But in 1875, Gilbert and Sullivan were not yet a permanent team. Sullivan had already written two operas with F. C. Burnand, and in late 1874 he had travelled to Paris to see one of Offenbach's librettists, Albert Millaud, although it is not known if anything came of that meeting.

In late January 1875, The Times ran advertisements for the Royalty Theatre: "In preparation, a new comic opera composed expressly for this theatre by Mr. Arthur Sullivan, in which Madame Dolaro and Nelly Bromley will appear." Reginald Allen and other writers took this as an advertisement for Trial by Jury. However, as George McElroy noted, the advertisement does not mention a librettist, a peculiar omission if it was to have been W. S. Gilbert, since Gilbert was, at that point, better known to London theatregoers than Sullivan. Moreover, Trial has no place for two principal ladies, but The Zoo does. McElroy demonstrated that the January advertisement definitely was not for Trial, when he discovered a further advertisement in The Era of 14 March 1875, which noted that "In consequence of the continued success of La Périchole, the production of Mr. Sullivan's two-act opera is postponed." That two-act work must have been something entirely different from Trial by Jury, which is in one act, and which opened just eleven days later.

Commentators have suggested that The Zoo was mounted hastily to capitalize on the success of Trial. For instance, Hughes writes, "Sullivan was so bitten by the stage bug that at the request of another manager he dashed off The Zoo, with a librettist whose identity it would be kinder not to reveal since he afterwards did good work under a nom-de-plume." But McElroy wonders "how Sullivan came to discover and set this libretto, by a relative beginner, so quickly?" He notes that a 13 March 1875 gossip column in the Athenæum said that Sullivan was working on new music for a piece at the St. James's, although for a different opera. From this, McElroy speculates that Stephenson was already working on the libretto of The Zoo for the St. James, while Sullivan was still busy preparing for the opening of Trial:

It would seem strange (though, indeed, possible) for Sullivan to have undertaken a completely new opera while rushing to get Trial by Jury on stage. But if it had been finally decided that The Zoo would never make a two-act opera, while Sullivan had, perhaps, already composed numbers for it, this would have been a logical time to salvage them by telling Stephenson to boil the libretto down to one act and transferring the project to another theatre.

David Russell Hulme provides further evidence that the music of The Zoo, or at least part of it, was already in existence before Trial by Jury opened. He notes that Sullivan's sketch manuscript for Trial contains the first sixteen bars of a solo for the Usher that was deleted before the opera's premiere, called "His Lordship's always quits". Aside from a key change, it is the same tune that Sullivan would use for Carboy's aria in The Zoo, "I loved her fondly." But because Sullivan entered only a bit of the tune in his sketch, Hulme concluded that the composer "needed only a few notes to remind him of his intentions. (Nowhere else in the sketches do we find similar curtailment.) It is reasonable to suggest that he was able to do this because he intended drawing on ready-made material."

=== Early productions ===
The opera opened on 5 June 1875 at the St. James's Theatre in London under the management of Marie Litton, sharing the bill with a W. S. Gilbert comic play, Tom Cobb. Henrietta Hodson starred as Eliza Smith. Trial by Jury was still running at the Royalty Theatre with La Périchole. Terence Rees observed:

[T]here are two seemingly explicit references to Offenbach's La Périchole, for both Carboy's comic attempt at suicide and the efforts of the chorus to revive the swooning nobleman have their parallels in the Offenbach work. The particular point of this imitation seems to lie in the fact that La Périchole was at that time sharing the bill with Sullivan's own Trial by Jury at a theatre not too distant from the St James', and the audience at The Zoo might reasonably be expected to know this."

The Zoo ran for three weeks until the end of Litton's season, then transferred to the Haymarket Theatre on 28 June 1875, and closed on 10 July 1875. Its five-week run, between the two theatres, was not the hit that Trial by Jury had been, although Kurt Gänzl says that it "achieved a certain degree of success." There was a second production of The Zoo at the Philharmonic Theatre, Islington, from 2–30 October 1875, with Richard Temple (the future principal bass-baritone in the Savoy Operas) starring as the nobleman-in-disguise at the zoo, Thomas Brown. There it ran together with Offenbach's Les géorgiennes.

Sullivan then prevented the opera from being produced, for several years, although other producers were interested in reviving it. Allen quotes a letter of 22 June 1877, in which the composer wrote in the third person, "Mr. Sullivan begs to inform Mr. Cowper that the 'Zoo' has not yet been published, nor will it until considerable alterations have been made." In a letter to his friend Alan Cole on 22 November 1877, he wrote, "They want to revive the 'Zoo' at the Strand. Will you rewrite it with me?" Both letters suggest that the composer was less than satisfied with what he had done in 1875. The final production of the piece during Sullivan's lifetime was at the Royalty Theatre from 14 April 1879 to 3 May 1879, with Lottie Venne as Eliza and W. S. Penley as Mr. Grinder. Sullivan is not known to have made any of the revisions he had contemplated in 1877.

It was once believed that Sullivan had re-used the music of The Zoo in his later compositions. In 1927, Herbert Sullivan and Newman Flower wrote, "The Zoo was a trifle composed by Sullivan in 1875. ... It was never printed, and much of the music was used up again by the composer in his later Savoy operas." This statement turned out to be one of many misleading statements in Sullivan and Flower's book: when the score of The Zoo was rediscovered, and since then, no re-use of music from The Zoo has been identified.

=== Modern productions ===
Herbert Sullivan inherited the manuscript of The Zoo, and with the death of his widow, Elena, in 1957, the score became available. In 1966, Dr. Terence Rees bought the score of The Zoo at auction and commissioned the creation of orchestra parts and a vocal score. The modern premiere was given by the amateur Fulham Light Opera in 1971, broadcast by BBC Radio 3 in 1972 and first recorded professionally by the D'Oyly Carte Opera Company in 1978 with the Royal Philharmonic Orchestra; this was conducted by Royston Nash, and Geoffrey Shovelton voiced a narration.

Many productions of the show have been given since the 1970s. A professional production in the US was given by the Light Opera of Manhattan off-Broadway in New York City in 1980 (together with Trial and Cox and Box), repeated in 1981. Other professional productions have been given in North America, most notably by the 1995 Shaw Festival in Canada, when it was given 92 performances over a period of five months. Ohio Light Opera performed the piece in 1999. There was a single modern-dress performance of the work by Scottish Opera about 1982 at the Theatre Royal in Glasgow, Scotland. The first professional full production in Britain since 1879 was given in the spring of 2007 at the Finborough Theatre in London. In 2007, Charles Court Opera first performed The Zoo at Cirencester. In February 2009, the same company performed the opera at the Riverhouse Barn in London and at the International Gilbert and Sullivan Festivals in Buxton, England, in each of 2009 and 2010. They performed it again at the same Festival both in Gettysburg, Pennsylvania, and Buxton in 2011, as part of a triple bill with Trial and Cox, which has become a popular grouping of an evening of Sullivan's one-act operas. A 2015 production in Boston, Massachusetts, was paired with The Bear.

== Roles and casts ==
The following list shows the names of the original cast members, followed by those of the singers on the 1978 D'Oyly Carte recording.

- Æsculapius Carboy (tenor) – Carlos Florentine; Meston Reid
- Thomas Brown (baritone) – Edgar Bruce; Kenneth Sandford
- Mr. Grinder (baritone) – Charles Styne; John Ayldon
- Lætitia Grinder (soprano) – Gertrude Ashton; Julia Goss
- Eliza Smith (mezzo-soprano) – Henrietta Hodson; Jane Metcalfe

== Synopsis ==
At a zoological gardens, the proud and opinionated British Public gather to look at the animals. Æsculapius Carboy is discovered standing on a chair with a rope around his neck. The chorus insist that if he is going to commit suicide, he must first tell them the reason why. Carboy happily obliges. He had wooed Lætitia Grinder, the daughter of a prosperous grocer. Her father, Mr. Grinder, disapproved of their relationship, but Carboy, an apothecary (pharmacist), was able to communicate with her "in prescriptions." But one day, the labels for a dose of peppermint for Lætitia and a lotion for her father's back were mixed up. Carboy, believing that he has killed his love, has despaired of all hope. He intends to kill himself, but Eliza Smith, the no-nonsense keeper of the refreshment stall at the zoo, forbids it.

Eliza's beau, Thomas Brown, appears, and they spend a romantic moment. Thomas begins to purchase and rapidly eat an astonishing amount of Eliza's refreshments. Lætitia enters, looking for Carboy. He is surprised to find her alive, but she explains that she did not drink the lotion as he had feared. They too describe their everlasting love and then combine with Thomas and Eliza as Eliza lists the remarkable catalogue of the food that Thomas has just eaten. Thomas explains that he has eaten all of her wares to prove his affection for her.

Thomas then faints, and the male zoogoers argue with their wives about how to revive him. Carboy, explaining that he is a physician, asks the crowd to stand back and steps in to help. After making a quick examination, he writes a prescription, which Eliza takes to be filled. Thomas now revives briefly, and before passing out again, makes a delirious comment that implies that he is of noble birth. Carboy unfastens his patient's jacket, and the crowd are shocked to find that Thomas is a Knight of the Garter. Thomas revives, and it turns out that he is the Duke of Islington (a joke reference, since Islington was then a working-class Cockney neighbourhood). He had disguised himself as a commoner so that he could search for a humble, virtuous wife without revealing his true rank. Now that his secret is discovered, Thomas makes a garbled but well-received speech and, taking the perceptive crowd's advice, resolves to propose marriage to Eliza as soon as he can change into his "native guise." He exits.

Mr. Grinder arrives looking for Carboy and Lætitia, but no one will help him. Eliza returns and is upset to find that Thomas has disappeared. The amused crowd tell her, mysteriously, that he will return soon. Still upset, Eliza laments that she is a simple little child who cannot understand why wealthy men have always showered her with gifts and invitations. Grinder returns, confronting his disobedient daughter and her beloved apothecary. Lætitia begs her father to let her marry Carboy, but Grinder once again refuses. Hearing this, Carboy asks the crowd for a rope with which to hang himself. Failing at that, and after bidding Lætitia a lengthy farewell, he heads for the bear pit in the hopes of being killed by the fearsome creatures.

Thomas Brown re-enters, now dressed as befits the Duke of Islington, and he grandly proposes to make Eliza his Duchess. She bursts into tears, reluctant to leave her beloved animals behind, but Thomas tells her not to worry: he has bought them all! Carboy now returns. His suicide attempt has failed, this time because the bear pit is being renovated, and the bears have been moved. He vows to head for the lion's den, but the Duke stops him. Thomas has reached a financial settlement with Mr. Grinder, who is now willing to accept Carboy as his son-in-law. The two pairs of lovers are united, and all ends happily, with the public proudly declaring that "Britons never, never will be slaves!"

== Musical numbers ==
- No. 1. "The British Public" (Chorus)
- No. 2. "I Loved Her Fondly" (Carboy and Chorus)
- No. 3. "And Now Let's Go Back... Ah Maiden Fair" (Carboy and Chorus, then Tom and Eliza)
- No. 4. "Laetitia's Song" (Laetitia)
- No. 4b. "Where Is He?" (Laetitia, Eliza, Tom, Carboy)
- No. 5. "Once More The Face" (Carboy, Laetitia, Eliza, Tom)
- No. 6, "Help! Ah Help!" (Tom and Chorus)
- No. 7. "Ho Guards! Minions!" (Tom, solos and Chorus)
- Nos. 8 & 9. "Ladies and Gentlemen...We Gather From What You Have Said" (Tom and Chorus)
- No. 10. "Where Is My Daughter?" (Grinder and Chorus)
- No. 11. "I'm A Simple Little Child" (Eliza)
- No. 12 "My Father!" (Laetitia, Carboy, Grinder and Chorus)
- No. 13. "What Do I See In This Disguise?" (Finale)
