= Frances Notley =

British novelist (1820–1912)

- Born: January 13, 1820; Liskeard
- Died: 1912
- Occupation: Novelist

Frances Eliza Millett Notley (January 13, 1820 – 1912) was a British sensation novelist who published under her own name and the pseudonym Francis Derrick. She was best known for the book Olive Varcoe (1868).

Frances Eliza Millett Thomas was born on January 13, 1820, at Landager in Liskeard, Cornwall, the daughter of William Millett Thomas, a promotor for a mining company. In 1843, she married George Notley. They had four daughters and a son, the Rev. James Thomas Benedictus Notley, future rector of Diptford, Devon.

She began her literary career with the novels Pique (1850) and Agatha Beaufort (1852). After her husband died in 1855, she relied on publishing to support herself and her children. She published numerous stories and serialized novels in publications including The Englishwoman's Domestic Magazine, The Family Herald, Beeton's Christmas Annual, The New Quarterly Magazine, Argosy, Temple Bar, and Belgravia.

She published Olive Varcoe (1868) under her pseudonym Francis Derrick. The title character is a mixed-race woman, the daughter of an English father and a women who might have been enslaved. Her father dies in Smyrna, so she is sent to Cornwall to live under the care of her father's cousin, Lady Trewavas. As an adult, she becomes involved in a love rectangle with Trewavas' sons. Olive is passionately in love with Sir Hilton Trewavas, who proposes to Eleanor Maristowe, with whom John Trewavas is in love. John Trewavas kills Eleanor and dies in prison following a confession. Hilton Trewavas then proposes to Olive, but she is engaged to Charles Vigo, but eventually Hilton and Olive marry. The novel was initially serialized in The Family Herald and its popularity prompted several translations and attempts at stage adaptations.

One of her last novels, From the Other Side (1887), features an intricate plot revolving around the engaged couple Estrild Carbonellis and Harold Olver. The Carbonellis estate in Cornwall has been cursed for generations by the Black Crusader, a horse-bound specter who precedes the death of a Carbonellis family member. Estrid's brother Tristram dies and Estrid refuses to marry in order to not perpetuate the curse for future generations. Olver travels from England to France to India in an effort to prove that Tristam was actually murdered and thus the curse does not exist. Meanwhile, other relatives covet Estrild's fortune: her uncle attempts insurance fraud to claim her fortune while Gilbert induces visions in Estrid in order to convince her to marry him. Eventually, these plots as well as the curse are foiled and the couple marries. The novel is noted for its use of Cornish dialect.

Frances Notley died at Totnes, Devon.

== Bibliography ==
1. Pique: A Novel. 3 vol. London: Smith, Elder, 1850.
2. Agatha Beaufort: or, Family Pride. 3 vol. London: Smith, Elder, 1852.
3. The Kiddle-a-Wink: or, Ghostly Stories on the Western Coast. 1 vol. London: S. O. Beeton, 1864.
4. Mildred's Wedding: A Family History. 3 vol. London: Frederick Warne, 1865.
5. Olive Varcoe. 3 vol. London: Saunders and Otley, 1868.
6. Simple as a Dove: A Novel. 3 vol. London: Tinsley Brothers, 1869.
7. Beneath the Wheels: A Romance. 3 vol. London: Tinsley Brothers, 1870.
8. Patience Caerhydon: A Story. 3 vol. London: Tinsley Brothers, 1870.
9. Family Pride: A Novel. 3 vol. London: Tinsley Brothers, 1871.
10. Forgotten Lives: A Novel. 3 vol. London: Tinsley Brothers, 1875.
11. Love's Young Dream: A Novel. 3 vol. London: Tinsley Brothers, 1877.
12. Love's Crosses: A Novel. 3 vol. London: Bentley, 1878.
13. Time Shall Try: A Novel. New York: Harper & Brothers, 1878.
14. Cordelia: A Novel. 3 vol. London: Bentley, 1879.
15. The History of an Opal-Ring. 1 vol. London: William Stevens, 1880.
16. In the House of a Friend. London: 1881.
17. Red Riding Hood. 3 vol. London: Hurst and Blackett, 1883.
18. Mind, Body, and Estate. And Sea Maidens. 3 vol. London: Ward and Downey, 1885.
19. From the Other Side. J. W. Lovell Company, 1887.
20. The Power of the Hand: A Romance. 3 vol. London: Ward and Downey, 1888.
