= A Study in Scarlet =

1887 detective novel by Arthur Conan Doyle

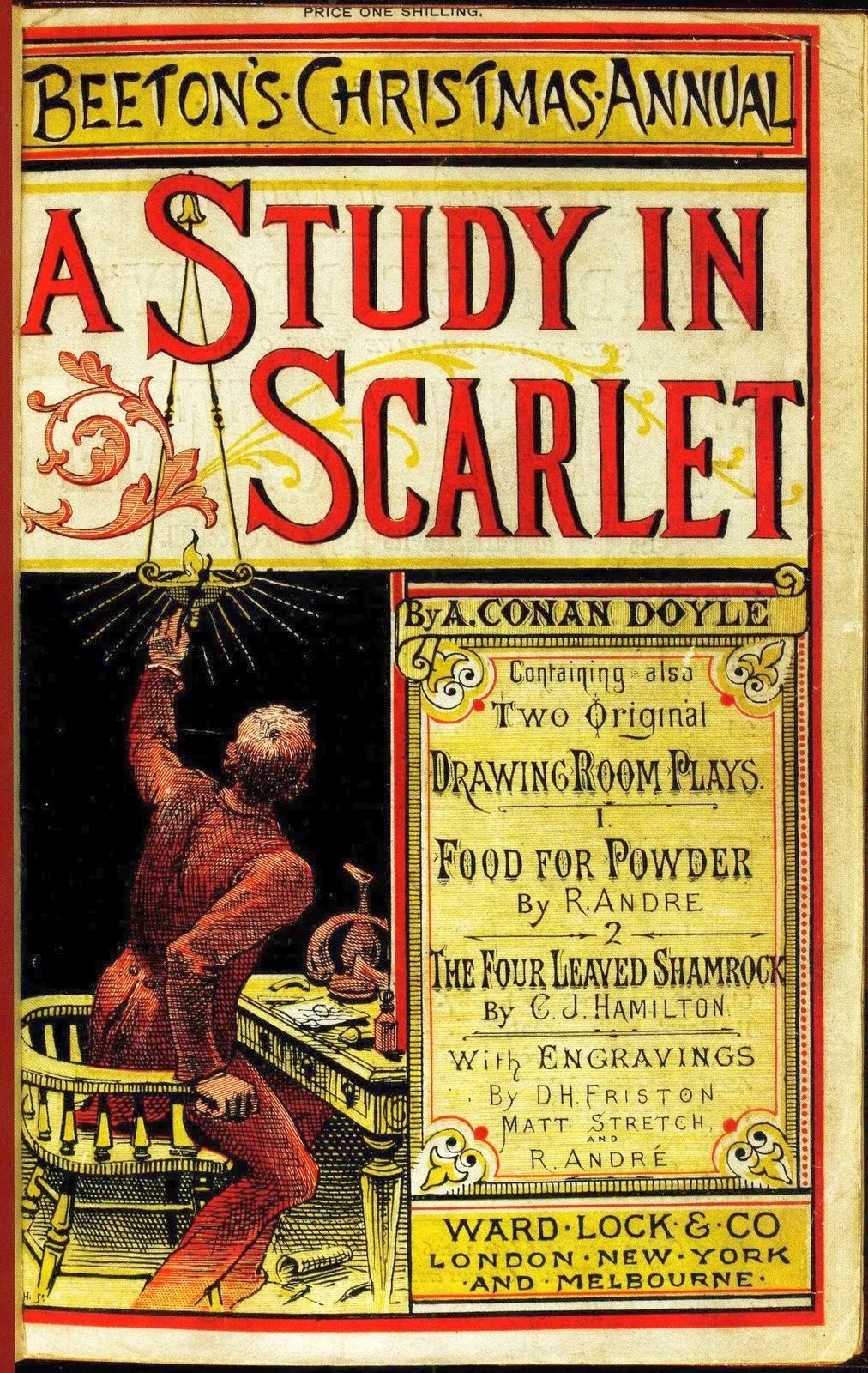
- First edition in annual cover, 1887
- Author: Arthur Conan Doyle
- Language: English
- Series: Sherlock Holmes
- Genre: Detective fiction
- Publisher: Ward Lock & Co
- Publication date: December 1887 in annual; July 1888 as book
- Publication place: United Kingdom
- Followed by: The Sign of the Four
- Text: A Study in Scarlet at Wikisource

Sample
The first chapter of A Study in Scarlet read by LibriVox volunteer David Clarke.

A Study in Scarlet is a detective novel by British author Arthur Conan Doyle. Published in 1887, the story marks the first appearance of Sherlock Holmes and Dr. Watson, who would go on to become one of the most well-known detective duos in literature.

The book's title derives from a speech given by Holmes, a consulting detective, to his friend and chronicler Watson on the nature of his work, in which he describes the story's murder investigation as his "study in scarlet": "There's the scarlet thread of murder running through the colourless skein of life, and our duty is to unravel it, and isolate it, and expose every inch of it."

The story, and its main characters, attracted little public interest when it first appeared. Eleven complete copies of the magazine in which the story first appeared, Beeton's Christmas Annual for 1887, are known to exist now, which have considerable value. Although Conan Doyle wrote 56 short stories featuring Holmes, A Study in Scarlet is the first of only four full-length novels in the original canon. It was followed by The Sign of the Four, published in 1890.

A Study in Scarlet was the first work of detective fiction to incorporate the magnifying glass as an investigative tool.

== Plot ==
=== Part I: The Reminiscences of Watson ===
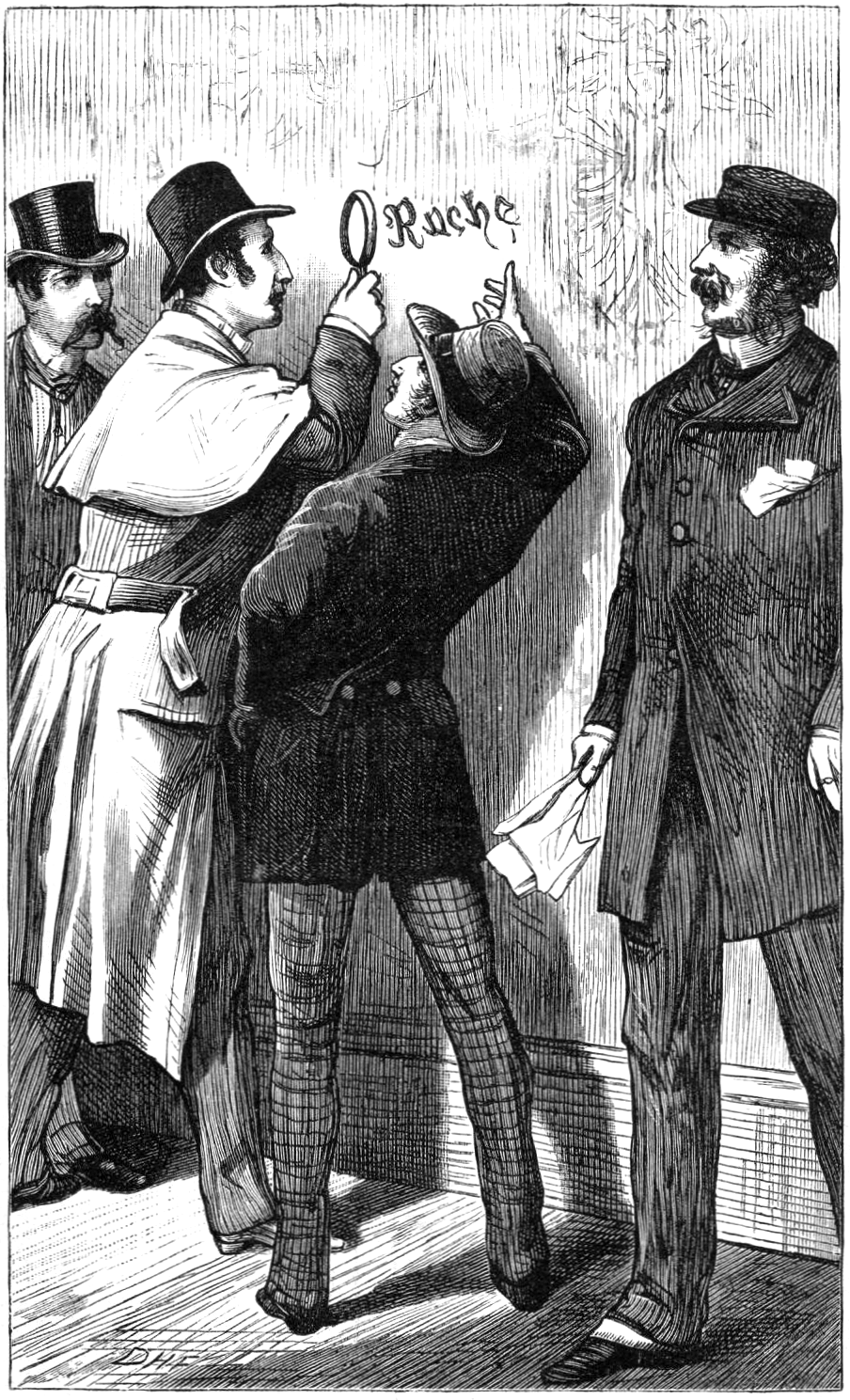
Watson, Holmes, Lestrade and Gregson analysing the "rache" clue

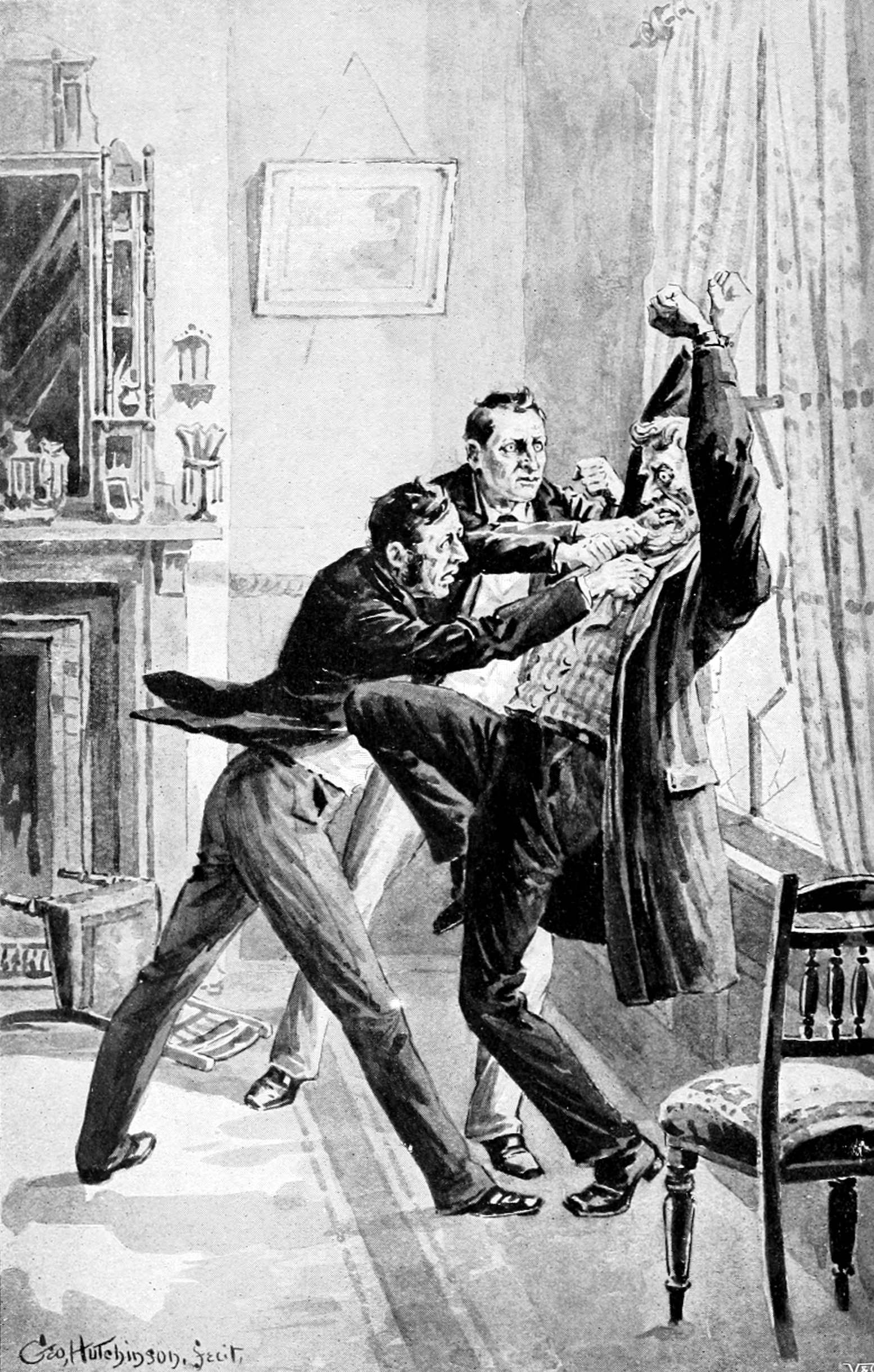
Hope being arrested

In 1881, Doctor John Watson returns to London after serving in the Second Anglo-Afghan War and starts looking for a place to live. An old friend of his named Stamford tells him that Sherlock Holmes is looking for someone to split the rent at a flat at 221B Baker Street but cautions Watson about Holmes' eccentricities. Holmes and Watson meet and, after assessing each other and the rooms, they move in. Holmes is a "consulting detective", and his frequent guests are clients. After a demonstration of Holmes' deductive skills, Watson's disbelief turns into astonishment. A telegram requests a consultation in a murder case. Watson accompanies Holmes to the crime scene, an abandoned house on Brixton Road. Inspectors Gregson and Lestrade are already on the scene. The victim is Enoch Drebber of Cleveland, Ohio, and documents found on his person reveal that he has a secretary, Joseph Stangerson. The room is splashed in blood, and the word "RACHE" (German for "revenge") is written in it on one wall; however, Drebber's body shows no wounds. Dismissing the message as a ploy to mislead the police, Holmes deduces that Drebber was poisoned and supplies a description of the murderer. Upon moving Drebber's body, they discover a woman's gold wedding ring.

Holmes places notices in several newspapers about the ring and buys a facsimile of it, hoping to draw the murderer – who has apparently already tried to retrieve the ring – out of hiding. An old woman answers the advertisement, claiming that the ring belongs to her daughter. Holmes gives her the duplicate and follows her, but she evades him in a way that leads Holmes to believe that "she" was actually a young man in disguise, an accomplice to the murderer. A day later, Gregson visits Holmes and Watson, telling them that he has arrested a suspect. He went to Madame Charpentier's Boarding House where Drebber and Stangerson stayed before the murder. Drebber, a drunk, attempted to kiss Mrs. Charpentier's daughter, Alice, which caused their immediate eviction. He, however, came back later that night and attempted to grab Alice, prompting her older brother to attack him. He attempted to chase Drebber with a cudgel but claimed to have lost sight of him. Gregson has him in custody on this circumstantial evidence.

Stangerson is later found dead in his hotel room, stabbed through the heart and with the word "RACHE" written in blood on the wall. The only things Stangerson had with him were a novel, a pipe, a telegram saying "J.H. is in Europe", and a small box containing two pills. Holmes tests the pills on an old and sickly Scottish Terrier in residence at Baker Street. The first pill produces no evident effect, but the second kills the terrier. A young street urchin named Wiggins then arrives. He is the leader of the Baker Street Irregulars, a group of street children Holmes employs to help him occasionally. Wiggins has summoned a cab Holmes wanted. Holmes sends him down to fetch the cabby, claiming to need help with his luggage. When the cabby comes upstairs, Holmes handcuffs and restrains him. The captive cabby is Jefferson Hope, the murderer of Drebber and Stangerson.

=== Part II: "The Country of the Saints" ===
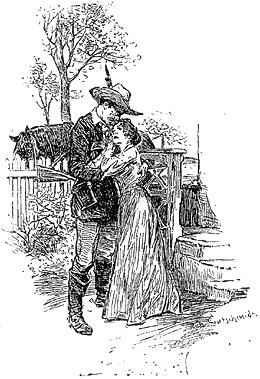
Jefferson Hope and Lucy Ferrier

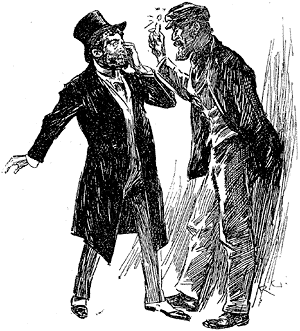
Drebber and Hope

In Utah's Salt Lake Valley in 1847, John Ferrier and a little girl named Lucy, the only survivors of a small party of pioneers, are rescued from death by a party of Latter-day Saints led by Brigham Young, but only on the condition that they adopt and live under the Mormon faith. Years later in 1860, a now-grown Lucy befriends and falls in love with Jefferson Hope. However, Young forbids her from marrying outside the faith and demands that she marry either Joseph Stangerson or Enoch Drebber, both sons of members of the church's Council of Four. Ferrier, who has adopted Lucy and sworn never to marry his daughter to a Mormon, sends word to Hope in order to help them escape.

Lucy is given one month to choose between her suitors. Hope arrives on the eve of the last day, and they all escape under cover of darkness. While Hope is hunting in the mountains, the Mormons catch up to the escapees; Stangerson kills Ferrier, while Lucy is taken back to the Mormons' settlement and forced to marry Drebber. She dies of a broken heart less than a month later. Hope breaks into Drebber's house the night before Lucy's funeral to kiss her body and remove her wedding ring. He swears vengeance on Drebber and Stangerson but begins to suffer from an aortic aneurysm, causing him to leave the mountains to earn money and recuperate. After returning years later, he learns Drebber and Stangerson have fled Salt Lake City after a schism between the Mormons. Drebber is now wealthy from Lucy's estate and Stangerson has become his secretary. For over 20 years Hope pursues them; in Cleveland, Hope recognizes Drebber who has Hope imprisoned for a few months as a "rival in love". After being released, Hope tracks them to Europe through France, Russia, Denmark and to England.

In London, Hope becomes a cabby and eventually finds Drebber and Stangerson. After the altercation with Madame Charpentier's son, Drebber gets into Hope's cab and spends hours drinking. Hope then takes him to the house on Brixton Road and forces Drebber to recognize him and to choose between two pills, one of which is harmless and the other poison. Drebber takes the poisoned pill, and as he dies Hope shows him Lucy's wedding ring. The excitement coupled with his aneurysm causes his nose to bleed; he uses the blood to write "RACHE" on the wall above Drebber to confound the investigators. Stangerson, on learning of Drebber's murder, refuses to leave his hotel room. Hope climbs in through the window and gives Stangerson the same choice of pills. However, Stangerson attacks him and Hope stabs him in the heart as an act of self-defence.

Hope dies from his aneurysm on the night after his capture. Holmes reveals to Watson how he deduced the murderer's identity, including a telegram inquiry he had sent to Cleveland in order to gain information about Drebber's background; the reply to it led him to focus on Hope. Outraged at the fact that the newspapers give Lestrade and Gregson full credit for solving the cases, Watson suggests that Holmes publish his own account of the investigation. When Holmes declines, Watson decides to write one himself.

== Publication ==
Arthur Conan Doyle wrote the novel at the age of 27 in less than three weeks. As a doctor in general practice in Southsea, Hampshire, he had already published short stories in several magazines of the day, such as the periodical London Society. The story was originally titled A Tangled Skein and was eventually published by Ward, Lock & Co. in the 1887 edition of Beeton's Christmas Annual, after many rejections. Conan Doyle had pressed for royalty but instead received £25 in return for the full rights (equivalent to £3,371.95 considering inflation). It was illustrated by David Henry Friston.

The novel was first published as a book in July 1888 by Ward, Lock & Co, and featured drawings by the author's father, Charles Doyle. In 1890, J. B. Lippincott & Co. released the first American version. Another edition published in 1891 by Ward, Lock & Bowden Limited (formerly Ward, Lock & Co.) was illustrated by George Hutchinson. A German edition of the novel published in 1902 was illustrated by Richard Gutschmidt. Numerous further editions, translations and dramatisations have appeared since.

== Depiction of Mormonism ==
According to a Salt Lake City newspaper article, when Conan Doyle was asked about his depiction of the Latter-day Saints' organisation as being steeped in kidnapping, murder and enslavement, he said: "all I said about the Danite Band and the murders is historical so I cannot withdraw that, though it is likely that in a work of fiction it is stated more luridly than in a work of history. It's best to let the matter rest." Conan Doyle's daughter has stated: "You know, father would be the first to admit that his first Sherlock Holmes novel was full of errors about the Mormons." Historians speculate that "Conan Doyle, a voracious reader, would have access to books by Fannie Stenhouse, William A. Hickman, William Jarman, John Hyde and Ann Eliza Young, among others", in explaining the author's early perspective on Mormonism.

Years after Conan Doyle's death, Levi E. Young, a descendant of Brigham Young and a Mormon general authority, stated that the author had privately apologised, saying that "He [Conan Doyle] said he had been misled by writings of the time about the Church" and had "written a scurrilous book about the Mormons."

In August 2011, the Albemarle County, Virginia, school board removed A Study in Scarlet from the district's sixth-grade required reading list following complaints from students and parents that the book was derogatory toward Mormons. It was moved to the reading lists for the tenth-graders, and remains in use in the school media centres for all grades.

== Adaptations ==
=== Film ===
As the first Sherlock Holmes story published, A Study in Scarlet was among the first to be adapted to the screen. In 1914, Conan Doyle authorised a British silent film be produced by G. B. Samuelson. In the film, titled A Study in Scarlet, Holmes was played by James Bragington, an accountant who worked as an actor for the only time of his life. He was hired for his resemblance to Holmes, as presented in the sketches originally published with the story. As early silent films were made with film that itself was made with poor materials, and film archiving was then rare, it is now a lost film. The film was successful enough for Samuelson to produce the 1916 film The Valley of Fear.

A two-reel short film, also titled A Study in Scarlet, was released in the United States in 1914, a day after the British film with the same title was released. The American film starred Francis Ford as Holmes and was not authorised by Doyle. It is also a lost film.

The 1933 film titled A Study in Scarlet, starring Reginald Owen as Holmes and Anna May Wong as Mrs Pyke, bears no plot relation to the novel. Aside from Holmes, Watson, Mrs. Hudson, and Inspector Lestrade, the only connections to the Holmes canon are a few lifts of character names (Jabez Wilson, etc.). The plot contains an element of striking resemblance to one later used in Agatha Christie's novel And Then There Were None (1939).

=== Audio ===
Edith Meiser adapted A Study in Scarlet into a four-part serial for the radio series The Adventures of Sherlock Holmes. The episodes aired in November and December 1931, with Richard Gordon as Holmes and Leigh Lovell as Watson.

Parts of the story were combined with "The Adventure of Charles Augustus Milverton" for the script of "Dr Watson Meets Mr Sherlock Holmes", one of multiple radio adaptations featuring John Gielgud as Holmes and Ralph Richardson as Watson. The episode first aired on the BBC Light Programme on 5 October 1954 and also aired on NBC Radio on 2 January 1955.

The story was adapted for the 1952–1969 BBC radio series in 1962 by Michael Hardwick, with Carleton Hobbs as Holmes and Norman Shelley as Watson. It aired on the BBC Home Service.

Another British radio version of the story adapted by Hardwick aired on 25 December 1974, with Robert Powell as Holmes and Dinsdale Landen as Watson. The cast also included Frederick Treves as Gregson, John Hollis as Lestrade, and Don Fellows as Jefferson Hope.

A radio dramatisation of the story aired on CBS Radio Mystery Theater during its 1977 season, with Kevin McCarthy as Holmes and Court Benson as Watson.

A Study in Scarlet was adapted as the first two episodes of the BBC's complete Sherlock Holmes 1989–1998 radio series. The two-part adaptation aired on Radio 4 in 1989, dramatised by Bert Coules and starring Clive Merrison as Holmes, Michael Williams as Watson, Donald Gee as Inspector Lestrade, and John Moffatt as Inspector Gregson.

It was adapted as a 2007 episode of the American radio series The Classic Adventures of Sherlock Holmes, with John Patrick Lowrie as Holmes, Lawrence Albert as Watson, Rick May as Lestrade, and John Murray as Gregson.

In 2023, the podcast Sherlock & Co. adapted the beginning of the story in its first episode, "Mr Sherlock Holmes", but only allude to the mystery itself at the very end and in the following episode. It starred Paul Waggot as Watson and Harry Attwell as Sherlock. For their 3rd annivseray, in October 2026 they would go on to adapt the story in a ten-part series, focusing on the "The Country of the Saints" half, Sherlock provides more details of the first half the adventure.

=== Television ===
The 1954–1955 television series (with Ronald Howard as Holmes and H. Marion Crawford as Watson) used only the first section of the book as the basis for the episode "The Case of the Cunningham Heritage".

The book was adapted into an episode broadcast on 23 September 1968 in the second season of the BBC television series Sherlock Holmes, with Peter Cushing in the lead role and Nigel Stock as Dr Watson.

It was adapted as the second episode of the 1979 Soviet television film, Sherlock Holmes and Dr. Watson (the first episode combines the story of their meeting with "The Adventure of the Speckled Band"; the second episode adapts the actual Jefferson Hope case).

A 1983 animated television film adaptation was produced by Burbank Films Australia, with Peter O'Toole voicing Holmes. In both the 1968 television adaptation featuring Peter Cushing and the 1983 animated version featuring Peter O'Toole, the story is changed so that Holmes and Watson already know each other and have been living at 221B Baker Street for some time.

A Study in Scarlet is one of several stories not adapted for the television series starring Jeremy Brett between 1984 and 1994.

Steven Moffat loosely adapted A Study in Scarlet into "A Study in Pink" as the first episode of the 2010 BBC television series Sherlock featuring Benedict Cumberbatch as a 21st-century Sherlock Holmes, and Martin Freeman as Dr Watson. The adaptation retains many individual elements from the story, such as the scribbled "RACHE" and the two pills, and the killer's potentially fatal aneurysm (although it is located in his brain rather than his aorta), as well as their profession at the time of the killings. However, the entire backstory set in America is omitted, and the motivation of the killer is completely different. It also features Moriarty's presence. The first meeting of Holmes and Watson is adapted again in the Victorian setting in the special "The Abominable Bride".

"The Deductionist", an episode of Elementary, contains many elements of Hope's case, including the motivation of revenge. The story was more closely adapted in the season 4 episode, "A Study in Charlotte".

"The First Adventure", the first episode of the 2014 NHK puppetry series Sherlock Holmes, is loosely based on A Study in Scarlet and "The Adventure of the Six Napoleons". In it, Holmes, Watson and Lestrade are pupils at a fictional boarding school called Beeton School. They find out that a pupil called Jefferson Hope has taken revenge on Enoch Drebber and Joseph Stangerson for stealing his watch. "Scarlet Story", the series' opening theme tune, is named after the novel. The name of "Beeton School" is partially inspired by Beeton's Christmas Annual.

"A Study in S", the eighth and ninth episodes of Japanese anime "Moriarty the Patriot" was loosely based on the novel, sharing names and motives with much of it, but changing the crime's characters' nationality to fit the setting and removing all references to Mormonism.

=== Other media ===
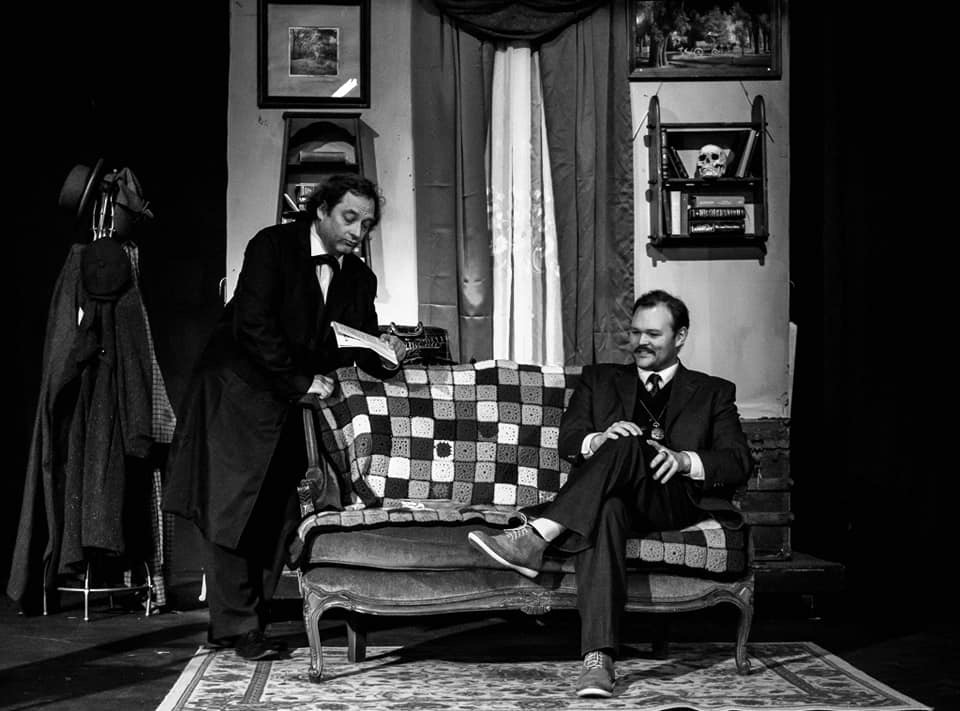
The 2019 debut performance of Sherlock Holmes and the Scarlet Avenger in Nuremberg, Pennsylvania

A Study in Scarlet was illustrated by Seymour Moskowitz for Classics Illustrated comics in 1953. It was also adapted to graphic novel form by Innovation Publishing in 1969 by James Stenstrum and illustrated by Noly Panaligan, by Sterling Publishing in 2010 by Ian Edginton and illustrated by I. N. J. Culbard, and by Hakon Holm Publishing in 2013 illustrated by Nis Jessen.

In 2014, A Study in Scarlet was adapted for the stage by Greg Freeman, Lila Whelan and Annabelle Brown for Tacit Theatre. The production premiered at Southwark Playhouse in London in March 2014.

In February 2019, a new adaptation of A Study in Scarlet was staged at DM Performance Works at the Factory in Nuremberg, Pennsylvania. It was adapted by Bill Amos under the title Sherlock Holmes and the Scarlet Avenger. In August 2025, the play was produced a second time by The Pennsylvania Theater of Performing Arts in Hazleton, Pennsylvania.

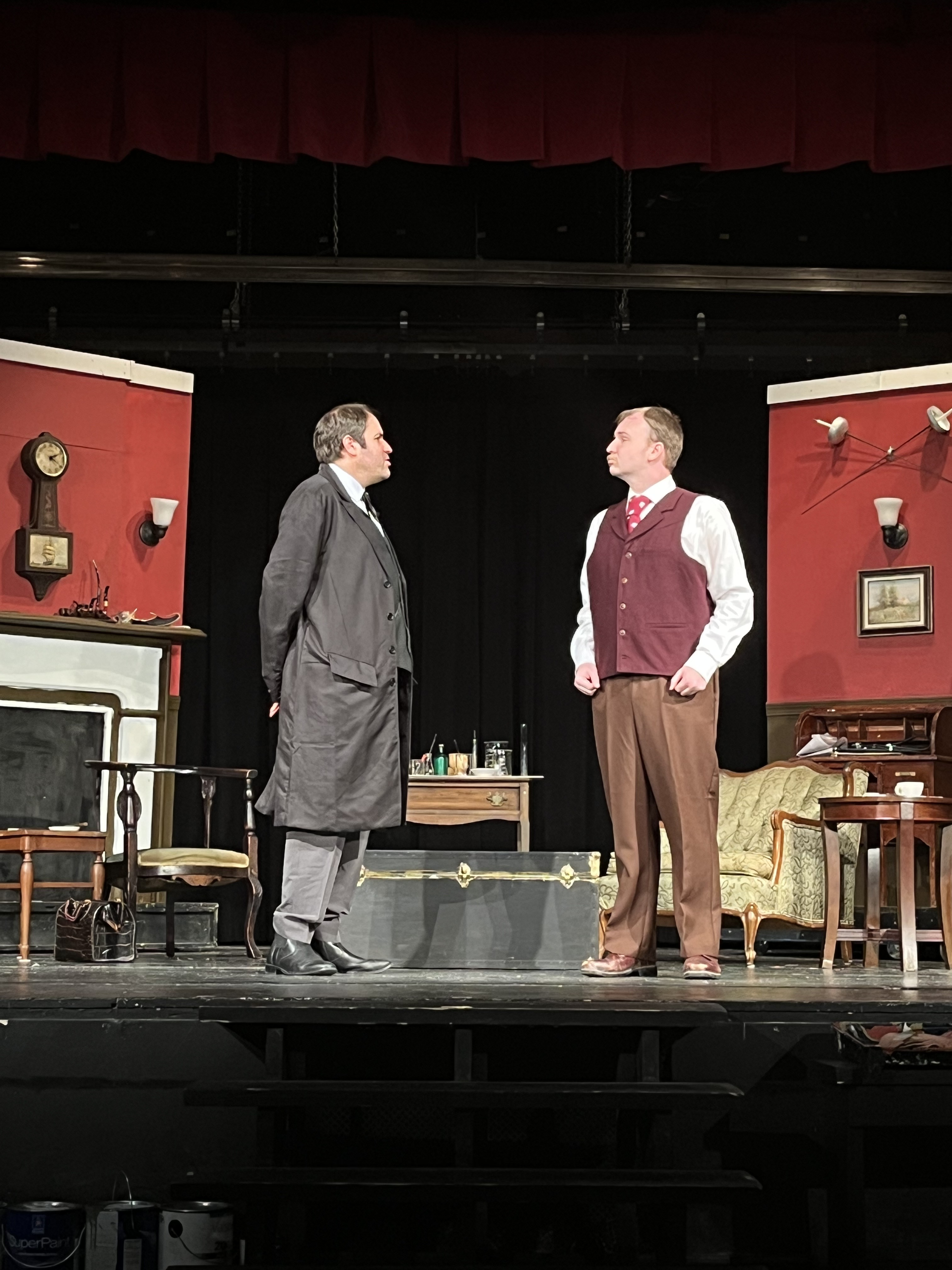
Matthew Bubel and Anthony McKenney as Holmes and Watson, respectively, in the 2025 PTPA revival production of "Sherlock Holmes and the Scarlet Avenger" in Hazleton, Pennsylvania.

In June 2022, Pitlochry Festival Theatre produced a new adaptation by playwright and actor Lesley Hart, Sherlock Holmes: A Study in Lipstick, Ketchup and Blood performed in an outdoor amphitheater by two performers. The production uses A Study in Scarlet as a play within a play set in a post-apocalyptic future.

=== Experiences ===
In August 2026, the Singapore studio Hidden launched A Study in Red: The Official Sherlock Experience, a 90-minute location-based game played on participants' own smartphones across Bugis Junction, Bugis+ and Bugis Street in Singapore. The case adapts A Study in Scarlet, relocating the investigation from Victorian London to the Bugis district and drawing on the neighbourhood's history. The game was produced under an exclusive licence from the Conan Doyle Estate, which selected Hidden ahead of British competitors; The Straits Times described it as the world's first site-specific Sherlock Holmes experience, and the studio has said it intends to stage the format in London.

== Allusions in other works ==
In his Naked Is the Best Disguise (1974), Samuel Rosenberg notes the similarity between Jefferson Hope's tracking of Enoch Drebber and a sequence in James Joyce's novel Ulysses, though of course Joyce's work did not begin to appear in print until 1918. Several other associations between Conan Doyle and Joyce are also listed in Rosenberg's book.

The British fantasy and comic book writer Neil Gaiman adapted this story to the universe of horror writer H. P. Lovecraft's Cthulhu Mythos. The new short story is titled "A Study in Emerald" (2004) and is modelled with a parallel structure.

In Garage Sale Mystery: The Novel Murders (2016), the second murder is an imitation of this murder.

In The Great Ace Attorney 2: Resolve, a character by the name of Enoch Drebber appears in the third case. Rather than a Mormon who forced a woman into an abusive marriage and was killed for it, Drebber is instead a brilliant scientist and engineer who worked on a device to get revenge on the man that ruined his life.

The Will Brandon novel A Study in Crimson (2023) situates the meeting of the Holmes and Watson counterparts, Captain Derrick Miles and Dr. Frank Hooper, in Fort Worth, Texas, in 1876, with a historical backstory set during the Comanche captivity of Cynthia Ann Parker and Rachel Plummer.
