= David Henry Friston =

British artist

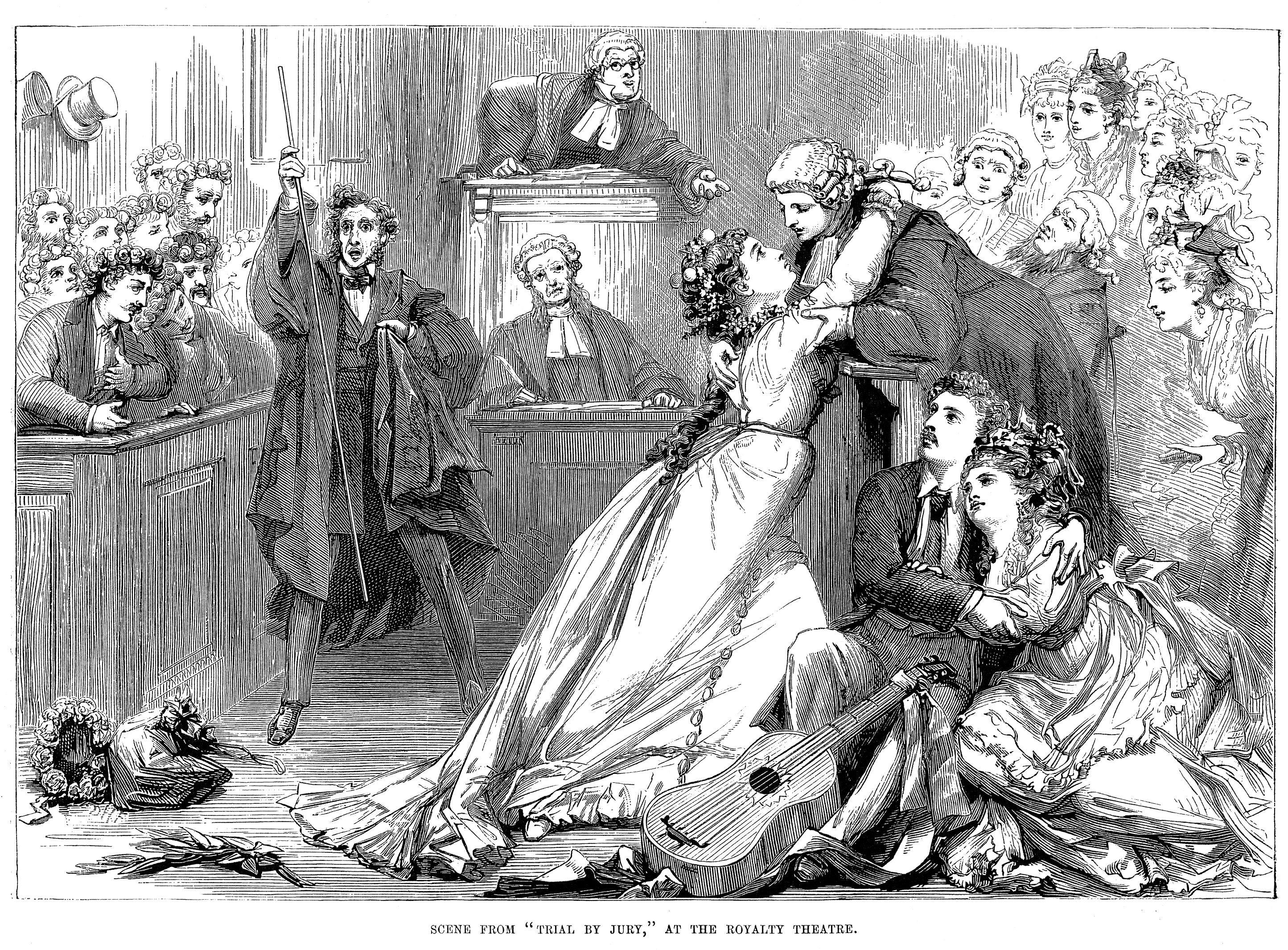
Friston's illustration of Trial by Jury (1875)

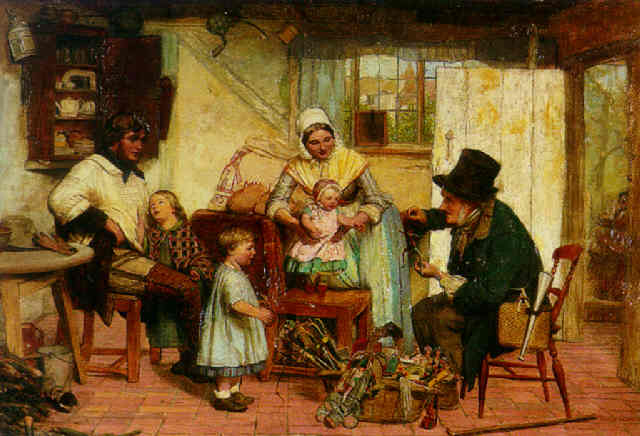
Friston's canvas The Toy Seller, c. 1869

David Henry Friston (1820–1906) was a British illustrator and figure painter in the Victorian Era. He is best remembered as the creator of the first illustrations of Sherlock Holmes in 1887, as well as his illustrations of the female vampire story Carmilla (1872). He is also remembered for his illustrations accompanying reviews of Gilbert and Sullivan operas and plays of W. S. Gilbert in The Illustrated London News and the Illustrated Sporting and Dramatic News in the 1870s and 1880s.

== Biography ==
Friston produced illustrations and artworks from the 1850s to the late 1880s. His professional career appears to have started by 1853, when he exhibited Mazeppa at the Royal Academy of Art. Friston exhibited at the Royal Academy of Art a total of 14 times between 1853 and 1869, though he was never elected a member of the Academy. He also exhibited at least six examples of his work at the British Institution (between 1854 and 1867). In their critical companion to the 1858 Royal Academy of Arts exhibition, the Council of Four record the presence of Friston's work A Rising Artist, in the West Room of the galleries, noting of Friston "Considerable character in the boy

By 1863 Friston had started making illustrations for various books and periodicals, including The Churchman's Family Magazine (1863), Tinsley's Magazine (1867), extensively for the Illustrated London News between 1869 and 1878, The Boys' Herald and Dark Blue (1871–73). Among his earlier published works was a frontispiece for Emma Davenport's Our Birthdays, and How to Improve Them (1864). His illustrations for journals include many engravings accompanying reviews of the original productions of Gilbert and Sullivan operas or plays of W. S. Gilbert in the 1870s, including The Princess (1870), Thespis (1871), The Wicked World (1873), The Realm of Joy (1873), The Happy Land (1873), Sweethearts (1874), Tom Cobb (1875), Trial by Jury (1875), H.M.S. Pinafore (1878) and Princess Ida (1884). For Cassell, he illustrated an edition of John Bunyan's Pilgrim's Progress. He also illustrated short stories such as the cult-classic female vampire story Carmilla (1872), The Three Lieutenants (1874) and The Three Commanders (1875) (the last two by William Henry Giles Kingston). For Groombridge, he illustrated a volume of children's stories called The magnet stories for summer days and winter nights.

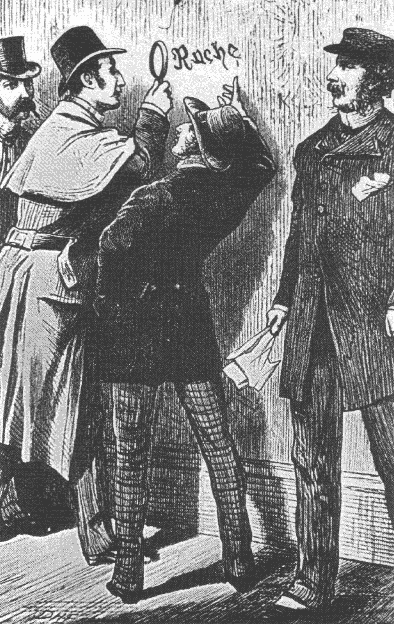
Arthur Conan Doyle, A Study in Scarlet: illustration by David Henry Friston, in Beeton's Christmas Annual, 1887

In 1887, Friston was chosen by Ward, Lock & Co. to supply the illustrations for the first edition of Arthur Conan Doyle's first Sherlock Holmes novel, A Study in Scarlet, which was also the first Sherlock Holmes adventure. Friston created four pictures for the story, which were engraved by W.M.R. Quick, and published in the 1887 issue of Beeton's Christmas Annual. Friston's pictures are acknowledged to be the first portraits of the Holmes character. The annual was issued in November at a price of one shilling and had sold out before Christmas.

The Bookman of New York noted, in 1932, that Friston's Holmes had attracted some criticism: "For the initial appearance of a detective whose exploits were to be recorded for nearly forty years, a veteran illustrator of that day, D. H. Friston, was called upon. This first picture of Holmes would distress the devotees. Friston's Holmes is neither handsome nor intellectual". The Bedside, Bathtub, and Armchair Companion to Sherlock Holmes agreed and described his Holmes as "an outrage". It noted of the detail of Friston's creation: "His head and hands appear small, almost feminine, his sideburns are ridiculously long, and his figure is plump, dwarfed by the oversize coat. On his head appears a strange, rounded hat. This Holmes looks nothing like the detective we know".

Also in the late 1880s, Friston illustrated the work of the American Mary Noailles Murfree, writing as Charles Egbert Craddock.
