= Golden jubilee =

50th anniversary

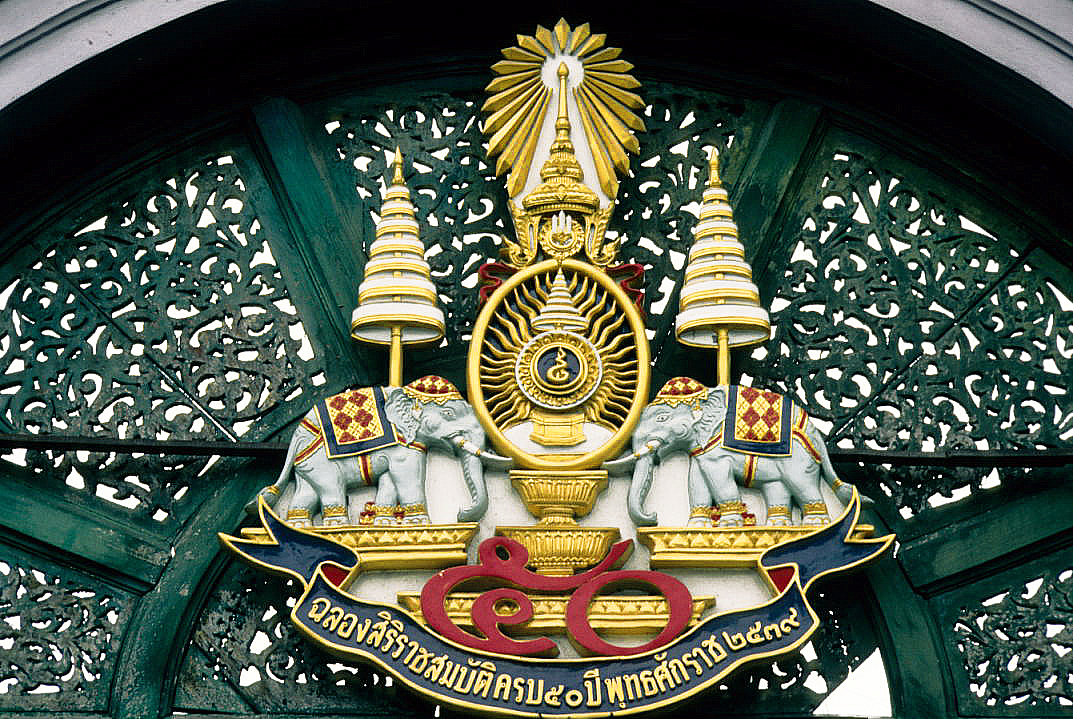
Emblem of the Golden Jubilee Ceremony of Bhumibol Adulyadej the Great, 1996

A golden jubilee marks a 50th anniversary. It variously is applied to people, events, and nations.

== Bangladesh ==
In Bangladesh, golden jubilee refers the 50th anniversary year of the separation from Pakistan and is called in Bengali "সুবর্ণ জয়ন্তী" (Shuborno jayanti). Vision 2021 was the political manifesto of the Bangladesh Awami League party before winning the National Elections of 2008. It stands as a political vision of Bangladesh for the year 2021, the golden jubilee of the nation. Several celebration programs will be held in countries including India, Russia, Germany, Sweden, Hungary, Poland, Nepal and Bhutan.

== China ==
- Emperor Wu of Han dynasty (141-87 BCE, Jubilee in 91 BCE)
- Kangxi Emperor of Qing dynasty (1661–1722, Jubilee in 1711)
- Qianlong Emperor of Qing dynasty (1735–1796, Jubilee in 1785)

== Korea ==
- Yeongjo of Joseon (1724–1776, Jubilee in 1774)

== Japan ==
In Japan, golden jubilee refers to the 50th anniversary and is called Go-Zai-i gojūnen kinen (御在位50年記念). Emperor Hirohito (or Emperor Shōwa), celebrated his golden jubilee on 10 November 1976. Showa Memorial Park was established as part of a project to commemorate his golden jubilee.

== Singapore ==
The Singapore50 logo representing the golden jubilee celebrations.

- For the year 2015, the "Singapore50" initiative was launched in Singapore to celebrate 50 years of independence from Malaysia, with a logo that spells "SG50". The term SG50 has since been used to refer to the celebrations as a whole. National Day Parade ceremonies for that year were themed Majulah Singapura – Our Golden Jubilee.

== Thailand ==
The golden jubilee is a royal ceremony to celebrate the 50th anniversary of the accession of the king. The Thai word is kanchanaphisek (กาญจนาภิเษก). The first Golden Jubilee of Thailand was the celebration of King Bhumibol Adulyadej.

=== The celebration ===
King Rama IX celebrated his golden jubilee on 9 June 1996, having acceded to the throne in 1946. He was Thailand's longest-reigning monarch.

The 545.65 carat Golden Jubilee Diamond was purchased by Thai businessmen as a gift for the king on the 50th anniversary of his coronation. The diamond is held in the Royal Palace as part of Thailand's crown jewels.

In 1996, Prime Minister Banharn Silpa-archa and the Thai people celebrated the king with a multi-day celebration.

=== The symbol of the golden jubilee ===
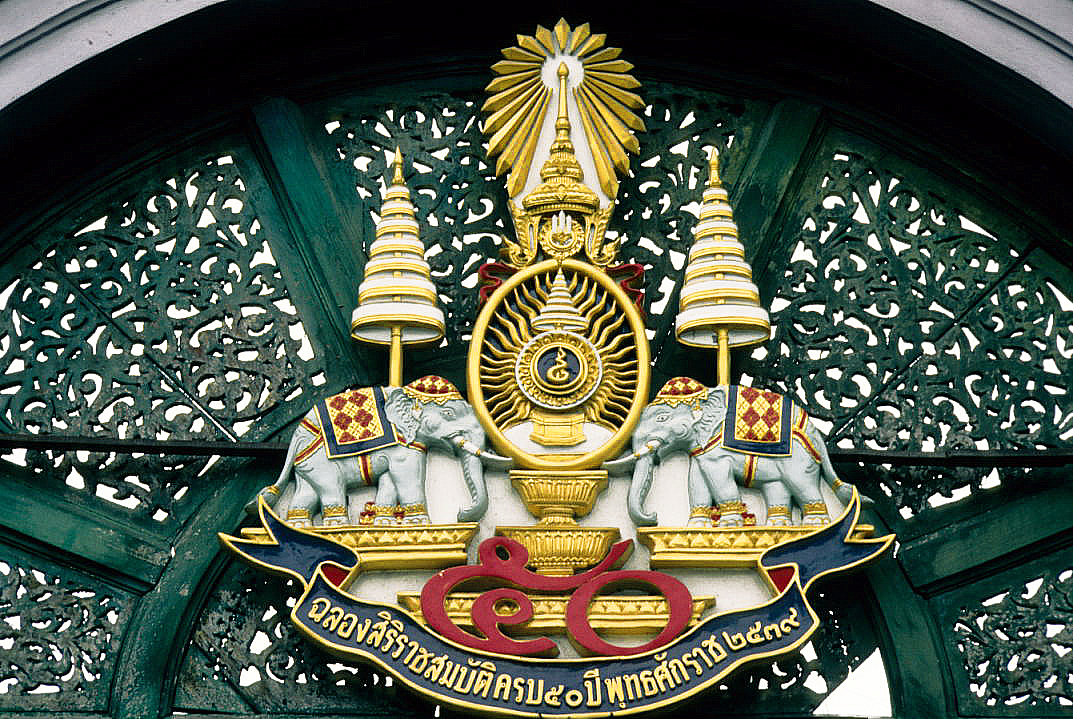

The symbol of the golden jubilee of King Bhumibol Adulyadej was designed by Wiyada Charoensuk, winner of a design contest.

There are three elements to the design:

- The king's throne (in center) is a sign of the Chakri dynasty (the dynasty of King Bhumibhol)
- White tiered umbrellas of kingship, representing the constitution of Thailand
- Two elephants, representing the Thai people

The Fine Arts Department wanted this design to:

- Celebrate the king
- Help Thai people remember Thailand's traditions
- Show that Thais are proud to be subjects of the king
- Show that Thais have a long history as a nation

=== Places named after the Golden Jubilee ===
- Kanchanaphisek Road
- Kanchanaphisek Bridge
- Golden Jubilee Network (th:เครือข่ายกาญจนาภิเษก)

== United Kingdom and other Commonwealth realms ==
In the United Kingdom and other Commonwealth realms, a golden jubilee celebration is held in the 50th year of a monarch's reign.

=== For King George III ===
George III of the United Kingdom's golden jubilee was celebrated on 25 October 1809, prior to the actual 50th anniversary in 1810.

=== For Queen Victoria ===
In 1887 the United Kingdom and the British Empire celebrated Queen Victoria's golden jubilee. Victoria marked 20 June 1887—the fiftieth anniversary of her accession—with a banquet, to which fifty European kings and princes were invited. Although she could not have been aware of it, there was a plan by Irish Republicans to blow up Westminster Abbey while the Queen attended a service of thanksgiving. This assassination attempt, when it was discovered, became known as the Jubilee Plot. At the time, Victoria was an extremely popular monarch.

=== For Queen Elizabeth II ===
Elizabeth II celebrated her golden jubilee in 2002, having ascended the throne in 1952.

== In other countries ==
- Brunei, Abdul Jalilul Akbar celebrated his golden jubilee in 1648.
- Brunei, Omar Ali Saifuddin I celebrated his golden jubilee in 1790.
- Bavaria, Charles Theodore, Elector of Bavaria celebrated his golden jubilee as Elector Palatine in 1792.
- Saxe-Weimar-Eisenach, Grand Duke Karl August celebrated his golden jubilee in 1826, dating from when he reached his majority.
- Austria-Hungary, Emperor Franz Josef celebrated his golden jubilee in 1898.
- Baden, Grand Duke Frederick I celebrated his golden jubilee in 1906. He earlier celebrated a different golden jubilee in 1902, dated from when he became regent to his brother before succeeding to the throne.
- Liechtenstein, Prince Johann II celebrated his golden jubilee in 1908.
- Montenegro, Nikola I Petrović-Njegoš celebrated his golden jubilee in 1910.
- Greece, King George I was assassinated mere weeks before his golden jubilee was due to be celebrated in 1913.
- Norway, King Haakon VII celebrated his golden jubilee in 1955.
- Burundi, King Mwambutsa IV Bangiriceng celebrated his golden jubilee in 1965.
- Ethiopia, Emperor Haile Selassie celebrated his golden jubilee, dating from when he became regent, in 1966.
- Iran, Naser al-Din Shah Qajar was assassinated and killed while visiting a holy place around Tehran as a religious ceremony and preparing to celebrate the 50th anniversary of his monarchy. (In Lunar Calendar)
- Iran, Shah Mohammad Reza Pahlavi celebrated the 50th anniversary of Pahlavi dynasty in 1976.
- Japan, Emperor Showa celebrated his golden jubilee in 1976.
- Monaco, Prince Rainier III celebrated his golden jubilee in 1999.
- Disneyland Resort celebrated its 50th anniversary of its opening on May 5, 2005.
- His Highness the Aga Khan IV celebrated his Golden Jubilee from July 11, 2007, to December 13, 2008.
- Malaysia, Sultan Tuanku Abdul Halim Muadzam Shah celebrated his golden jubilee on 15 July 2008 after 50 years reigning the state of Kedah.
- Egypt, the Egyptian Television celebrated its golden jubilee on 22 July 2010 after 50 years from airing for the first time.
- Kenya, the Nation Media Group's Daily Nation and Sunday Nation celebrated their golden jubilee in the year 2010 after 50 years from being published for the first time. (Sunday Nation – March 1960; Daily Nation – October 1960)
- In New Zealand, Kingseat Hospital celebrated 50 years of operation in 1982., and Maeroa Intermediate in 2004.
- Detroit, Michigan in the United States, the 1946 Automotive Golden Jubilee was a citywide celebration of the fiftieth anniversary of the American automotive industry.
- Alhaji (Dr.) Ado Bayero The Emir of Kano, Nigeria celebrated his Golden Jubilee in June 2013.
- Brunei, Sultan Haji Hassanal Bolkiah celebrated his Golden Jubilee on 5 October 2017 after 50 years of his accession to the throne.
- Denmark, Queen Margrethe II celebrated her Golden Jubilee on 14 January 2022, marking the 50th anniversary of her accession to the throne.
- Sharjah (United Arab Emirates), Sultan bin Mohamed Al-Qassimi III celebrated the 50th anniversary of his accession to the throne on 25 January 2022.
- Sweden, King Carl XVI Gustaf celebrated his Golden Jubilee on 15 September 2023, marking the 50th anniversary of his accession to the throne.
- Fujairah (United Arab Emirates), Hamad bin Mohammed Al Sharqi celebrated the 50th anniversary of his accession to the throne on 18 September 2024.
- Indonesia celebrated its 50th anniversary of Independence Proclamation on 17 August 1995, where it was known as "50 tahun Indonesia Emas" ('50 years of Golden Indonesia').
- Walt Disney World celebrated its 50th anniversary of its opening on October 1, 2021.
- Wikipedia will celebrate its 50th anniversary on January 15, 2051.

== List of golden jubilees ==
=== Monarchs ===
Monarch	Realm	Accession Day	Commemoration	Link to more information
George III	United Kingdom	25 October 1760	1809	Golden Jubilee of George III
Victoria	United Kingdom and the rest of the British Empire	20 June 1837	1887	Golden Jubilee of Queen Victoria
Franz Joseph I	Austro-Hungary	2 December 1848	1898	
Johann II	Liechtenstein	12 November 1858	1908	
Ibrahim Ibni Almarhum Sultan Abu Bakar	Johor	7 September 1895	1945	
Aga Khan III	Shia Ismaili	1885	1935	
Sobhuza II	Swaziland	10 December 1899	1949	
Haakon VII	Norway	8 November 1905	1955	
Hirohito (Emperor Showa)	Japan	25 December 1926	1976	
Franz Joseph II	Liechtenstein	25 July 1938	1988	
Bhumibol Adulyadej (Rama IX)	Thailand	9 June 1946	1996	
Rainier III	Monaco	9 May 1949	1999	
Elizabeth II	United Kingdom, Australia, Canada, New Zealand and 12 other Commonwealth realms	6 February 1952	2002	Golden Jubilee of Elizabeth II
Karim Aga Khan	Shia Ismaili	11 July 1957	2007	
Abdul Halim	Kedah, Malaysia	15 July 1958	2008	
Hassanal Bolkiah	Brunei	5 October 1967	2017	50th anniversary of the Sultan's accession
Margrethe II	Denmark	14 January 1972	2022	Golden Jubilee of Margrethe II
Sultan bin Mohamed Al-Qassimi III	Sharjah (United Arab Emirates)	25 January 1972	2022	
Carl XVI Gustaf	Sweden	15 September 1973	2023	Golden Jubilee of Carl XVI Gustaf
Hamad bin Mohammed Al Sharqi	Fujairah (United Arab Emirates)	18 September 1974	2024	

=== Sovereign states or dependent territories ===
Sovereign state or dependent territory	Independence day or formation day	Commemoration	More information
Japan	11 February 660 BC	610 BC	
Iran	550 BC	500 BC	
San Marino	3 September 301	3 September 351	
France	10 August 843	10 August 893	
Ethiopia	1270	1320	
Andorra	8 September 1278	8 September 1328	
Switzerland	1 August 1291	1 August 1341	
Spain	20 January 1479	20 January 1529	
Sweden	6 June 1523	6 June 1573	
Russia	16 January 1547	16 January 1597	
Portugal	1 December 1640	1 December 1690	
United States	4 July 1776	4 July 1826	
United Kingdom	1 January 1801	1 January 1851	
Haiti	1 January 1804	1 January 1854	
Serbia	15 February 1804	15 February 1854	
Ecuador	10 August 1809	10 August 1859	
Colombia	20 July 1810	20 July 1860	
Mexico	16 September 1810	16 September 1860	
Chile	18 September 1810	18 September 1860	
Paraguay	14 May 1811	14 May 1861	
Venezuela	5 July 1811	5 July 1861	
Luxembourg	9 June 1815	9 June 1865	
Argentina	9 July 1816	9 July 1866	
Greece	25 March 1821	25 March 1871	
Peru	28 July 1821	28 July 1871	
Costa Rica	15 September 1821	15 September 1871	
El Salvador	15 September 1821	15 September 1871	
Guatemala	15 September 1821	15 September 1871	
Honduras	15 September 1821	15 September 1871	
Nicaragua	15 September 1821	15 September 1871	
Brazil	7 September 1822	7 September 1872	
Bolivia	6 August 1825	6 August 1875	
Uruguay	25 August 1825	25 August 1875	
Belgium	21 July 1831	21 July 1881	
New Zealand	6 February 1840	6 February 1890	
Dominican Republic	27 February 1844	27 February 1894	
Liberia	26 July 1847	26 July 1897	
Denmark	5 June 1849	5 June 1899	
Italy	17 March 1861	17 March 1911	
Liechtenstein	15 August 1866	15 August 1916	
Canada	1 July 1867	1 July 1916	
Cuba	10 October 1868	10 October 1917	
Montenegro	13 July 1878	13 July 1928	
Qatar	18 December 1878	18 December 1928	
Philippines	12 June 1898	12 June 1948	
Guam, United States	10 December 1898	10 December 1948	
Puerto Rico, United States	10 December 1898	10 December 1948	
American Samoa, United States	2 December 1899	2 December 1949	
Australia	1 January 1901	1 January 1951	
North Macedonia	2 August 1903	2 August 1953	
Panama	3 November 1903	3 November 1953	
Norway	7 June 1905	7 June 1955	
Bulgaria	22 September 1908	22 September 1958	
South Africa	31 May 1910	31 May 1960	
Mongolia	29 December 1911	29 December 1961	
Taiwan	1 January 1912	1 January 1962	
Albania	28 November 1912	28 November 1962	
Ireland	24 April 1916	24 April 1966	
United States Virgin Islands, the United States	31 March 1917	31 March 1967	
Finland	6 December 1917	6 December 1967	
Lithuania	16 February 1918	16 February 1968	
Estonia	24 February 1918	24 February 1968	
Georgia	26 May 1918	26 May 1968	
Armenia	28 May 1918	28 May 1968	
Azerbaijan	28 May 1918	28 May 1968	
Czech Republic	28 October 1918	28 October 1968	
Slovakia	28 October 1918	28 October 1968	
Poland	11 November 1918	11 November 1968	
Latvia	18 November 1918	18 November 1968	
Romania	1 December 1918	1 December 1968	
Ukraine	22 January 1919	22 January 1969	
Afghanistan	19 August 1919	19 August 1969	
Åland, Finland	7 May 1920	7 May 1970	
Vatican City	11 February 1929	11 February 1979	
Iraq	3 October 1932	3 October 1982	
Lebanon	22 November 1943	22 November 1993	
Iceland	17 June 1944	17 June 1994	
Belarus	3 July 1944	3 July 1994	
North Korea	15 August 1945	15 August 1995	
South Korea	15 August 1945	15 August 1995	
Indonesia	17 August 1945	17 August 1995	
Vietnam	2 September 1945	2 September 1995	
Syria	17 April 1946	17 April 1996	
Jordan	25 May 1946	25 May 1996	
Pakistan	14 August 1947	14 August 1997	
India	15 August 1947	15 August 1997	
Myanmar	25 January 1948	25 January 1998	
Sri Lanka	4 February 1948	4 February 1998	
Faroe Islands, Denmark	23 March 1948	23 March 1998	
Israel	14 May 1948	14 May 1998	
China	1 October 1949	1 October 1999	50th anniversary of the People's Republic of China
Libya	24 December 1951	24 December 2001	
Egypt	23 July 1952	23 July 2002	
Cambodia	9 November 1953	9 November 2003	
Morocco	18 November 1955	18 November 2005	
Cocos (Keeling) Islands, Australia	23 November 1955	23 November 2005	
Sudan	1 January 1956	1 January 2006	
Tunisia	20 March 1956	20 March 2006	
Ghana	6 March 1957	6 March 2007	
Malaysia	31 August 1957	31 August 2007	
Guinea	2 October 1958	2 October 2008	
Senegal	4 April 1960	4 April 2010	
Togo	27 April 1960	27 April 2010	
Madagascar	26 June 1960	26 June 2010	
Congo, Democratic Republic of the	30 June 1960	30 June 2010	
Somalia	1 July 1960	1 July 2010	
Benin	1 August 1960	1 August 2010	
Niger	3 August 1960	3 August 2010	
Burkina Faso	5 August 1960	5 August 2010	
Ivory Coast	7 August 1960	7 August 2010	
Chad	11 August 1960	11 August 2010	
Central African Republic	13 August 1960	13 August 2010	
Congo, Republic of the	15 August 1960	15 August 2010	
Gabon	17 August 1960	17 August 2010	
Mali	22 September 1960	22 September 2010	
Cyprus	1 October 1960	1 October 2010	
Nigeria	1 October 1960	1 October 2010	
Mauritania	28 November 1960	28 November 2010	
Kuwait	25 February 1961	25 February 2011	
Sierra Leone	27 April 1961	27 April 2011	
Tanzania	9 December 1961	9 December 2011	
Samoa	1 June 1962	1 June 2012	
Burundi	1 July 1962	1 July 2012	
Rwanda	1 July 1962	1 July 2012	
Algeria	5 July 1962	5 July 2012	
Jamaica	6 August 1962	6 August 2012	
Trinidad and Tobago	31 August 1962	31 August 2012	
Uganda	9 October 1962	9 October 2012	
Kenya	12 December 1963	12 December 2013	
Malawi	6 July 1964	6 July 2014	
Malta	21 September 1964	21 September 2014	
Zambia	24 October 1964	24 October 2014	
Gambia	18 February 1965	18 February 2015	
Maldives	26 July 1965	26 July 2015	
Singapore	9 August 1965	9 August 2015	
Guyana	26 May 1966	26 May 2016	
Botswana	30 September 1966	30 September 2016	
Lesotho	4 October 1966	4 October 2016	
Barbados	30 November 1966	30 November 2016	
Yemen	30 November 1967	30 November 2017	
Nauru	31 January 1968	31 January 2018	
Mauritius	12 March 1968	12 March 2018	
Eswatini	6 September 1968	6 September 2018	
Equatorial Guinea	12 October 1968	12 October 2018	
Tonga	4 June 1970	4 June 2020	
Fiji	10 October 1970	10 October 2020	
Bangladesh	26 March 1971	26 March 2021	
United Arab Emirates	2 December 1971	2 December 2021	
Bahrain	16 December 1971	16 December 2021	
Bahamas	10 July 1973	10 July 2023	
Guinea-Bissau	24 September 1973	24 September 2023	
Grenada	7 February 1974	7 February 2024	
Mozambique	25 June 1975	25 June 2025	
Cape Verde	5 July 1975	5 July 2025	
Comoros	6 July 1975	6 July 2025	
São Tomé and Príncipe	12 July 1975	12 July 2025	
Papua New Guinea	16 September 1975	16 September 2025	
Angola	11 November 1975	11 November 2025	
Suriname	25 November 1975	25 November 2025	
Timor-Leste	28 November 1975	28 November 2025	
Seychelles	29 June 1976	29 June 2026	

=== Organizations ===
Organization	Inauguration	Commemoration	More information
International Olympic Committee	23 June 1894	23 June 1944	
BBC	18 October 1922	18 October 1972	
Warner Bros. Pictures	4 April 1923	4 April 1973	
The Walt Disney Company	16 October 1923	16 October 1973	
Metro-Goldwyn-Mayer	17 April 1924	17 April 1974	
United Nations	24 October 1945	24 October 1995	
Disneyland Resort	17 July 1955	17 July 2005	
Universal Studios Hollywood	15 July 1964	17 July 2014	
Walt Disney World	1 October 1971	1 October 2021	

== See also ==
- Hierarchy of precious substances
- List of longest-reigning monarchs
- List of current reigning monarchs by length of reign
- Wedding anniversary
