= Terence Rees =

British historian and scientist

Terence Albert Ladd Rees (24 February 1928 – 15 November 2014) was a microbiologist but was best known as a collector of material relating to the theatre and music in Wales and Britain. He was also a published theatre historian and researcher, and, in particular, was an authority on the works of W. S. Gilbert and Arthur Sullivan who, as Gilbert and Sullivan, wrote 14 comic operas in the late Victorian era.

== Biography ==
Rees was born at Barry in Glamorgan, educated at the local county school, the University of Cardiff (1948–1952), and the University of London (1954–1957). He spent 1965 to 1967 as a Research Fellow at the Institute of Diseases of the Chest at Brompton in London, and between 1967 and 1981 he lectured in microbiology at The Institute of Laryngology and Otology at University College London. Rees later resided in Powys and in Swansea, Wales. Rees was an avid researcher of theatrical topics, and his oft-cited 1978 book, Theatre Lighting in the Age of Gas, has been called "(aptly) illuminating, and pleasantly non-technical."

=== Gilbert and Sullivan ===
After considerable research about Gilbert and Sullivan's first collaboration, Thespis, Rees developed, and in 1964 published, a version of the libretto for that work that attempts to correct the many errors noted in the surviving libretto, as part of his book Thespis – A Gilbert & Sullivan Enigma. Rees also prepared a performance version, based on the libretto, which included a few interpolated lyrics from Gilbert's non-Sullivan operas in an attempt to replace the missing songs. A score was supplied by Garth Morton, based on music from lesser-known Sullivan operas, and this version was premiered in 1962 at the University of London and recorded in 1972. The interpolated songs do not appear in Rees' 1964 book.

Rees collected a number of original Sullivan manuscripts, including the operas The Zoo, The Contrabandista, Haddon Hall, The Chieftain, and The Emerald Isle, and several major Sullivan orchestral pieces. He purchased several of these at auction in 1966, following the death of the widow of Arthur Sullivan's nephew Herbert Sullivan. Herbert had inherited the scores on his uncle's death, and on his own death in 1928 they passed to his wife, who later remarried, becoming Mrs Elena M. Bashford. She died in 1957. Rees and David Russell Hulme worked together to save a number of autograph manuscripts of the composer Edward German.

The Zoo is an 1875 one-act operetta by Arthur Sullivan and B. C. Stephenson, who wrote the libretto under the pseudonym Bolton Rowe. The score was believed lost until Rees located it in the 1950s in the vault at Coutts Bank, where several Sullivan manuscripts were stored. The discovery was particularly important, because Herbert Sullivan wrote in 1927 that his uncle re-used the music of The Zoo in the later operas, but this turned out to be false. After Herbert's widow died, Rees purchased the manuscript at the 1966 auction. He then arranged for a piano/vocal reduction of The Zoo to be published. Using Rees's materials, the operetta received its first modern production in 1971, was subsequently broadcast by the BBC and was recorded by the D'Oyly Carte Opera Company in 1978. Rees also discovered the libretto to W. S. Gilbert's 1863 play Uncle Baby (Gilbert's first produced play), which he published in 1968, and in 1983 he found six of the original 1887 portraits from the original production of Ruddigore at the former Normansfield Hospital. In 1977, Rees and Roderick Spencer published a collection of then-rarely heard Sullivan vocal selections, Sing With Sullivan. These included cut numbers from Iolanthe and The Yeomen of the Guard and songs from several of Sullivan's operas with librettists other than Gilbert that were then nearly unknown. This volume did much to encourage the rehabilitation of these works.

In 2006, Rees donated to the British Library his collection of original manuscript scores, including The Zoo, The Contrabandista, The Chieftain, Haddon Hall, The Emerald Isle, Gilbert and Frederic Clay's Princess Toto, and Edward German's Merrie England and A Princess of Kensington, as well as prompt books for Princess Toto and Haddon Hall, among 19 volumes of materials.

He died in 2014, aged 86.

=== Publications ===
Gilbert and Sullivan

- Thespis – A Gilbert & Sullivan Enigma (1964) London: Dillon's University Bookshop. ISBN 0-900333-04-9
- W. S. Gilbert, Uncle Baby: A Comedietta, edited by Terence Rees (1968) Privately printed. ISBN 0-9500108-0-4
- The Zoo, "A Note on the Libretto" (1969) London: Cramer.
- W. S. Gilbert and Henri Meilhac, The Realm of Joy: Being a Free and Easy Version of Le Roi Candaule, edited by Terence Rees (1969) Privately printed. ISBN 0-9500108-1-2
- "W. S. Gilbert and the London Pantomime Season of 1866" in Gilbert and Sullivan: Papers Presented at the International Conference Held at the University of Kansas in May 1970 (1971) Helyar, James (ed.) University of Kansas Libraries.
- A Sullivan Discography, Sir Arthur Sullivan Society (ed. 1986) ISBN 0-9507348-5-3
- Rees and Roderick Spencer, Sing With Sullivan (1977 songbook) (Reviewed in W. S. Gilbert Society Journal, edited by Brian Jones. Vol. 1, No. 3: Spring 1986, p. 94)
- Rees, Terence (March 1984). "Ruddigore Rediscovered". Theatrephile. 1 (2): 27–31.
- "The Happy Land: Its True and Remarkable History" in W. S. Gilbert Society Journal, edited by Brian Jones. (1994) Vol. 1 No. 8, pp. 228–37
- "W. S. Gilbert's Sleepwalking" (a new Gilbert discovery) in W. S. Gilbert Society Journal, edited by Brian Jones (Winter 2003) Vol. 2 No. 14, pp. 420–25

Other theatre

- Theatre Lighting in the Age of Gas (1978) Publisher: Society for Theatre Research ISBN 0-85430-025-2
- Rees and David Wilmore, British Theatrical Patents, 1801–1900 (1996) Society for Theatre Research ISBN 0-85430-058-9
