= A Study in Scarlet (1914 American film) =

1914 film by Francis Ford

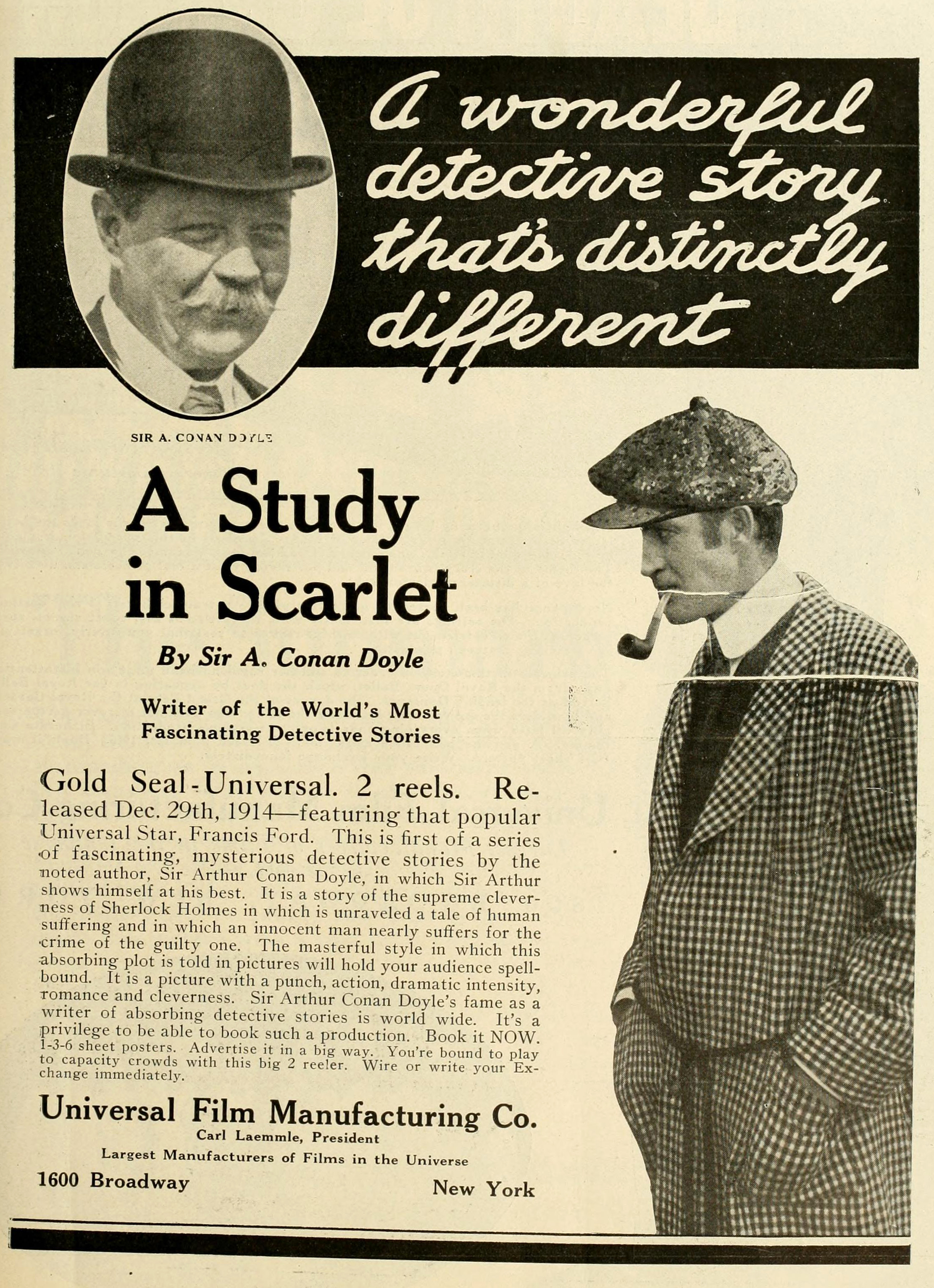
Advertisement for A Study in Scarlet, directed by and starring Francis Ford

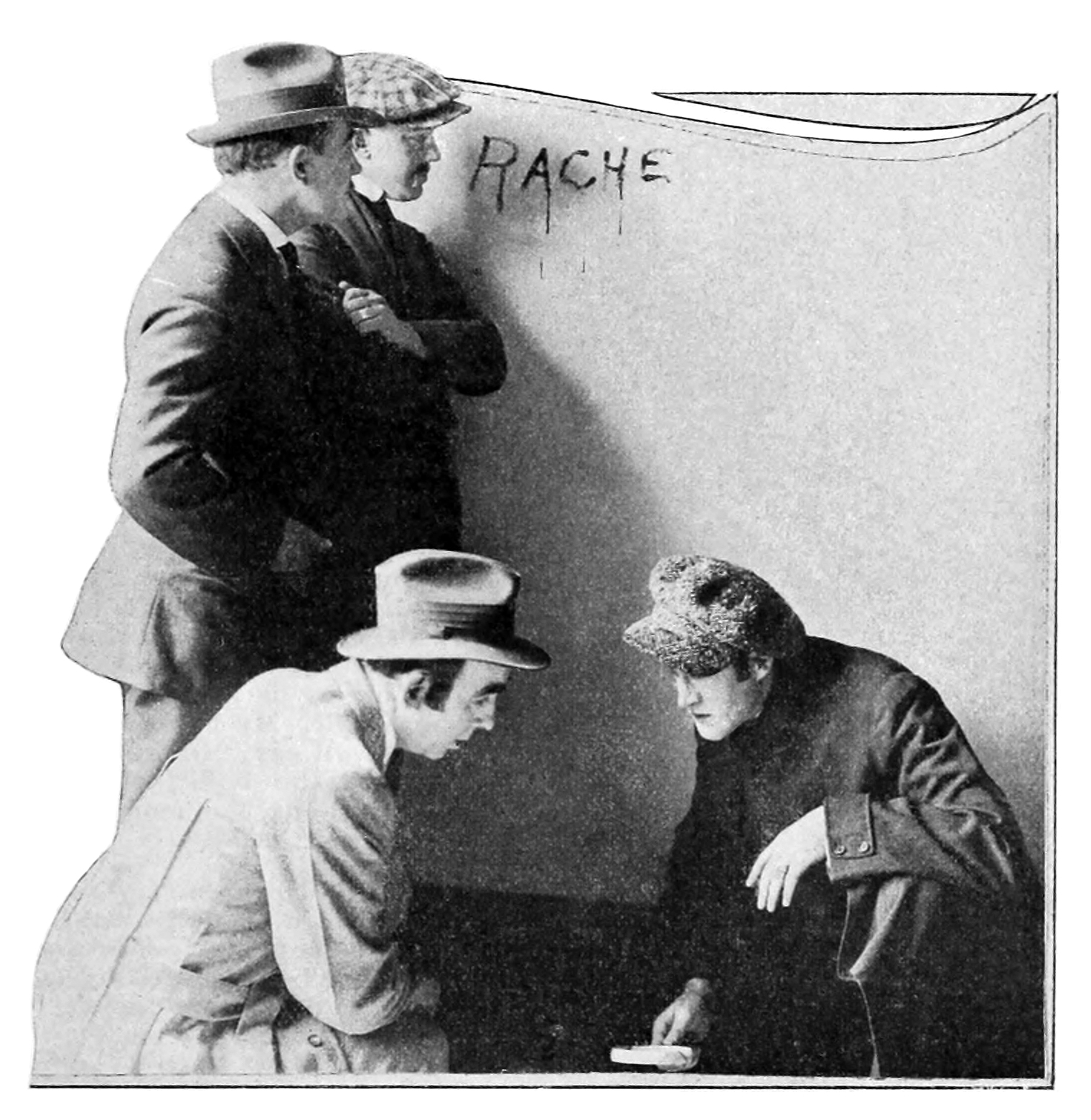
It is believed that John Ford played the role of John Watson — credited to "Jack Francis", a union of his first name and that of his older brother, who starred as Sherlock Holmes.

A Study in Scarlet is a 1914 American silent film directed by and starring Francis Ford as Sherlock Holmes. It is based on the Sir Arthur Conan Doyle 1887 novel of the same name.

It is believed that Ford's younger brother, John Ford, portrayed Dr. Watson.

The film was released on 29 December 1914, one day after the release of the British film of the same name. It is considered a lost film.
