= Tom Cobb =

Farce by W. S. Gilbert

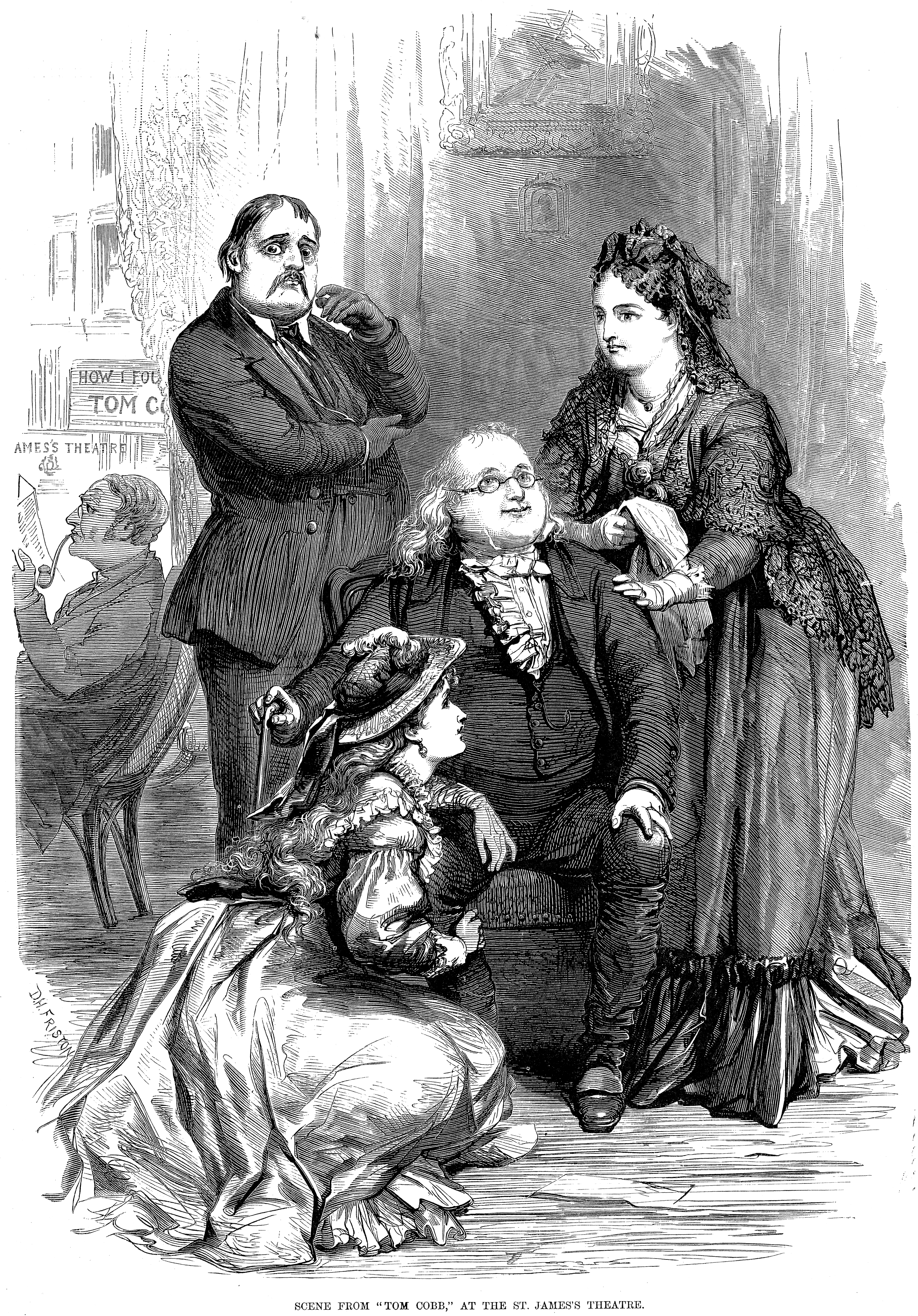
Engraving by D. H. Friston of the opening of Act III: Tom Cobb smokes on the balcony while the intense, romantic Effingham family form a group inside. Illustrated Sporting and Dramatic News, 15 May 1875

Tom Cobb or, Fortune's Toy is a farce in three-acts (styled "An Entirely Original Farcical Comedy") by W. S. Gilbert. The story concerns Tom, a young debtor who pretends to be a recently deceased man to avoid his debts. A family claims to inherit the dead man's fortune and pays Tom a pound a week to continue to live under an assumed name and keep quiet. He is claimed in marriage by the well-born Caroline Effingham who was jilted by the man whose name he has assumed. After further complications, Tom turns out, in actuality, to be the heir of the deceased and wealthy miser and happily marries Caroline.

The play opened at the St. James's Theatre on 24 April 1875. Although it was praised by the critics, the original production of the play ran for only 53 performances. Arthur Sullivan's The Zoo played as an afterpiece to Tom Cobb.

== Background ==
Gilbert and Sullivan had already produced their hit one-act comic opera Trial by Jury by the time Tom Cobb was written, but both Gilbert and Sullivan were still producing a considerable amount of work separately.

Several plot elements from Tom Cobb reappear in Gilbert and Sullivan's last opera, The Grand Duke (1896). This full-length romantic farce was a departure by Gilbert from his earlier farces, which had generally been short works in one act.

Gilbert claimed, in a 1903 story article called "My Last Client", that the idea for the play came to him when he attended the funeral of T. W. Robertson in 1871 and a man in the crowd reminded him of Robertson. However, Gilbert based Tom Cobb on a short story that he had written in 1871 called "Tom Poulton's Joke", in which the title character attends his own "funeral", as in the story told by Gilbert in "My Last Client". In Tom Cobb there is no such incident. Arthur Sullivan and F. C. Burnand had earlier written Cox and Box, in which a man describes how he "killed himself" yet remains alive.

== Roles and original cast ==
Colonel O'Fipp		An Irish Adventurer – Clifford Cooper
Tom Cobb; Whipple	} }	Young Surgeons – E. W. Royce and Edgar Bruce
Matilda O'Fipp		The Colonel's Daughter – Edith Challis
Mr. Effingham; Mrs. Effingham; Bulstrode Effingham; Caroline Effingham	} } } }	Members of a Romantic Family – Mr. De Vere, Mrs. Chippendale, W. J. Hill, Marie Litton
Biddy		– Miss E. Doyne
Footman		– E. A. Russell

== Synopsis ==
Act I: A shabby but pretentious sitting-room in Colonel O'Fipp's house.

Matilda, the Colonel's daughter, is engaged to Tom Cobb, a penniless young surgeon. Tom rents a room at O'Fipp's house. He is in debt to a moneylender and has lent the money to O'Fipp in exchange for some worthless I.O.U.s. The money-lender has just signed judgement against Tom, so Tom is in bad financial straits as the play opens.

Whipple, a successful young surgeon, also wishes to marry Matilda. He proposes to her, but she says she prefers Tom. She notes, however, that if Tom hasn't married her in another month, she'll talk to Whipple again. Tom tells Whipple about his financial difficulties. Whipple notes that one of his old patients has just died. The deceased had had no name of his own, so Whipple had called him Tom Cobb as a joke. Whipple suggests that Tom make people think the dead man is young Tom Cobb, lie low for a few months, and come back to life with a new name and a clean slate. Tom adopts the suggestion and leaves immediately, Whipple giving him £25 to tide him over.

Caroline Effingham, an old school-friend of Matilda's, is a very romantic young woman. She tells Matilda that she fell in love with a "poet-soldier" with whom she has corresponded with but never met. However, he hasn't responded to her letters for some time, and when she finds him she will sue him for breach of promise.

Before Tom "died", he scribbled a joke "will" in which he left his worldly goods to Matilda. O'Fipp angrily crumples this up and throws it away. Whipple arrives with the news that the old pauper Tom Cobb was not a pauper at all, but a miser with a hoard of gold under his hearth but without any friends or relations. O'Fipp, retrieving the "will", lays claim to the money.

Act II: The same room, but now handsomely furnished.

Three months have passed, and Whipple is engaged to Matilda. The wealthy O'Fipps are happy, thanks to the "death" of Tom Cobb, and they agree that if he should decide to return from the dead, he will find it difficult to convince anyone of his identity.

Tom reappears looking "very seedy and dirty". His money has run out. Much to his bewilderment, O'Fipp, Matilda and Whipple all deny that he is Tom Cobb. O'Fipp suggests he assume another name, selecting one at random from the Times newspaper: Major-General Arthur Fitzpatrick. Tom accepts from O'Fipp a pound a week for as long as he keeps that name. "I'm so hungry, and seedy, and wretched," Tom says, "that I'd agree to anything."

Caroline Effingham and her family appear, and O'Fipp introduces Tom to them as Major-General Arthur Fitzpatrick. It turns out that this was the name of the "poet-soldier" who had jilted Caroline. To avoid being sued for breach of promise of marriage, Tom agrees to marry Caroline.

Act III: A drawing-room, shabbily furnished, in Mr. Effingham's house.

Three more months have passed, and Tom, engaged to Caroline, has grown his hair long and centre-parted, he wears a floppy Byronic collar, and he talks solemn poetic rubbish. He is now a poet-soldier. He does not wish to deceive Caroline, but he is afraid to tell her who he really is.

Docket & Tape, Solicitors, have been advertising in the papers for information about him, and he fears that they are after him for forging the will of old Tom Cobb. O'Fipp refuses to pay Tom his pound a week any more, because he believes that Tom's fear of prosecution for forgery will be enough to keep him quiet. Finally, Tom writes a letter to Docket & Tape, confessing everything. It turns out, however, that they have discovered that Tom was, in actuality, the grandson of the old miser, Tom Cobb. Therefore, he is a very wealthy man. Matilda now seeks to marry Tom, but he decides to marry Caroline.
