= Newman Flower =

Flower in 1917

Sir Walter Newman Flower (8 July 1879 – 12 March 1964) was an English publisher and author. He transformed the fortunes of the publishing house Cassell & Co, and later became its proprietor. As an author, he published studies of the composers George Frideric Handel, Franz Schubert and (as co-author) Arthur Sullivan. He also edited the million-word journals of Arnold Bennett for publication. His biographies were much admired at the time but have subsequently been criticised for over-cautious discretion.

== Life and career ==
=== Early years ===
Flower was born at Fontmell Magna, Dorset, England. He was the eldest son of John Walter Flower – a prosperous brewer – and his wife Wilhelmina Kate, née Newman. After schooling at the Whitgift School he entered the publishing trade in London at the age of 17.

=== Publishing ===
With the reluctant financial support of his father, who would have preferred his son to follow in his business, Flower secured an appointment as an unpaid "literary apprentice" to a publication called The Regiment. He wrote prolifically in his odd-duty hours, and eventually had an article accepted for publication in a weekly paper. He joined the staff of The London Magazine, part of the Harmsworth Press, learning on the job how to edit magazines.

Five chief editors controlled the Harmsworth periodicals, leaving little room for initiative or individual development among the junior members of staff. In 1906 Flower moved to a rival publisher, Cassell & Co. At that time Cassell was in the doldrums. Its recently appointed general manager, Arthur Spurgeon, recognised that vigorous change was needed and he recruited Flower. Spurgeon later recalled:

Quietly but effectively [Flower] unravelled tangled skeins; he submitted new propositions; he turned failures into successes; and in due course became our chief editor.

Cassell's magazine division, inspired and run by Flower, rescued Cassell's from steep decline. When he took over the weekly Penny Magazine in February 1906, it had forty pages and a circulation of 31,000. Under Flower the magazine was expanded to sixty-four pages; its circulation increased week by week and soon had passed 100,000. Flower built up a stable of magazine titles that grew to dominate the British magazine market for many years. He commissioned pieces from, among many others, Rudyard Kipling, Thomas Hardy, G. K. Chesterton and Somerset Maugham.

At the close of 1912 Spurgeon asked Flower to take over the book-publishing side of the business, which was in an even worse condition than the magazines had been. The company had few new titles to publish: the financial terms offered by Cassell were so poor that authors and their agents looked elsewhere. Through his successes with the magazines Flower was on excellent terms with many prominent authors, to whom he now turned. He gradually built up a list, with big names including Chesterton, Arnold Bennett and H. G. Wells.

In 1920 Cassell was bought by William and Gomer Berry (later Viscounts Camrose and Kemsley). In 1926 the Berrys decided that book publishing lay outside the scope of their interests and they disposed of that arm of Cassell and Co. Flower raised enough money to buy it, becoming proprietor and managing director in 1927. In 1938, shortly after receiving a knighthood for services to literature, he retired, but returned during the Second World War to look after the literary affairs of the company while his successor, his son Desmond, was on active service.

Flower commissioned Winston Churchill's A History of the English-Speaking Peoples, which was eventually completed and published during the 1950s. During the war years, Churchill promised Flower that Cassell would be offered anything he later wrote about the war. The Times described the result, Churchill's The Second World War, as "perhaps the greatest coup of twentieth century publishing."

=== Writing ===
Herbert Sullivan (right) with his uncle Arthur

Flower was also an author. His life of George Frideric Handel was published in 1923 and reissued in a revised edition in 1959. The book was well received: Ernest Newman wrote that it was "a biography of Handel that for interest and accuracy is without a superior … the most complete study of Handel as a man that we have in English"; in 1927 The Bookseller said that it was "recognised as the standard work on the subject, both here and in America". Later writers on Handel have disputed Flower's portrait of Handel, calling it "sexless and safe", and a "compound of fact and fable".

In 1927 Flower collaborated with Herbert Sullivan in a biography of the latter's uncle, Sir Arthur Sullivan, his Life and Letters. This too was well received at the time: The Daily Telegraph called it "A most attractive and engaging book", and The Graphic said that it told "the whole story of the great composer's life". But, like the Handel book, it suffered later from critical disapproval for sanitising its subject, by suppressing evidence of Sullivan's gambling and sexual liaisons. In 1928 Flower published a study of Franz Schubert, and in 1945 and 1950 he published two volumes of memoirs.

His largest literary project was to prepare the journals of Arnold Bennett for publication – more than a million words in manuscript to be edited. Rupert Hart-Davis later commented on "the prudish timidity of their editor, old Newman Flower". He added, "according to Hugh Walpole, N. F. was so appalled by much of what he found in the journals that he published only brief extracts, and those the safest." (Note: Despite Flower's caution, he let through a paragraph soon judged by the High Court to be libellous, and the publisher had to pay £2,500 damages to the aggrieved party.) Flower's caution about what he published extended to the work of Radclyffe Hall, a good friend, whose work he admired, but although he told her that The Well of Loneliness was "one of the finest books that has gone through my hands", he dared not publish it. (Note: Hall's biographer Sally Cline comments that Cassell was not the only publishing house to reject the novel. Martin Secker refused to publish it. Heinemann also did so: like Cassell the house relied heavily on sales to lending libraries, which were seen as likely to reject the novel's unequivocal lesbian theme. It was finally accepted by Jonathan Cape, which sold directly to the public and was less dependent on library sales.)

=== Personal life ===
Flower was twice married, first in 1903 to Evelyne Readwin of Wells, Norfolk, with whom he had one son, Desmond Flower (1907–1997), the scholar and writer, who took over Cassell's after him; and second in 1943 to Bridget Downes of Coore, County Clare, Ireland.

He died at his home, Tarrant Keynston House, near Blandford, Dorset, aged 84.

== Notes, references and sources ==
=== Sources ===
- Cline, Sally (1998). Radclyffe Hall: A Woman Called John. London: John Murray. ISBN 978-0-71-955468-1.
- Dickson, Lovat (1975). Radclyffe Hall at The Well of Loneliness. New York: Scribner. ISBN 978-0-68-414530-3.
- Flower, Newman (1951). Just As It Happened. London: Cassell. OCLC 2600798.
- Hart-Davis, Rupert (1979). The Lyttelton Hart-Davis Letters, Volume 2. London: John Murray. ISBN 0-7195-3673-1.
- Nowell-Smith, Simon (1958). The House of Cassell 1848–1958. London: Cassell. OCLC 729078.
