= Herbert Sullivan =

British biographer (1868–1928)

Herbert Sullivan (right) with his uncle, Arthur Sullivan, c. 1890

Herbert Thomas Sullivan (31 August 1868 – 26 November 1928), known as "Bertie", was the nephew, heir and biographer of the British composer Arthur Sullivan. He grew up as his uncle's ward and worked briefly as an engineer. After his uncle's death, Sullivan became active in charitable work and performed tasks for the British government. He was co-author of a 1927 biography of Arthur Sullivan, well received but was later discredited because of its suppression of diary entries that mentioned the composer's gambling and sexual activity.

Sullivan inherited many of his uncle's papers and original music manuscripts. He left most of these to his wife, who died in 1957, and they finally were sold to collectors in 1966.

== Early years ==
Sullivan was the fourth child and eldest son of Frederic and Charlotte Sullivan, one of eight siblings. (Note: His brothers and sisters were: Amy Sophie (1863–1947), Florence Louise (1865–1891), Edith Mary (1866–1877), Maud "Cissie" Helen (1870–1940), Frederic Richard Sullivan, George Arthur (1874–1919) and William Lacy (1877–1902).) When Fred Sullivan died aged 39 in 1877, his younger brother, the composer Arthur Sullivan, made himself responsible for the support of Fred's widow and eight children. In 1881 Charlotte married Captain Benjamin Hutchinson, a man 13 years her junior. Charlotte emigrated to the US in 1883 with her husband and all her children except Herbert, who remained in England under the care of his uncle. (Note: Charlotte died in January 1885, barely a year after the move to California. Hutchinson, unable to cope with this loss and his responsibilities, soon returned to England, leaving the six surviving California children (Edith had died) to be raised mostly by their uncle William Lacy, with the financial support of their uncle Arthur.) At the age of nine, Sullivan began boarding school in Brighton, England, and later attended Christ's Hospital school. He studied in Germany from the autumn of 1884.

Arthur Sullivan's health was precarious from the 1880s onwards, and Herbert often accompanied his uncle to the South of France and other resorts where the composer rested or spent holidays. In 1886 Herbert returned to England from his studies in Germany, and he worked for ten months for Robert Fowler of the steam engine company John Fowler & Co. From 1889 to 1890, he was working for Siemens in Charlton, London, where the company manufactured undersea cables. In October 1890, at 22 years of age, Herbert was engaged for an engineering job surveying for the laying of cable between Caribbean islands and Brazil which continued, off and on, during 1891. He returned to England in September of that year. After this Herbert worked for much of the time for Brush Electrical Engineering in Loughborough and London until 1894. He then spent the rest of the 1890s primarily as his uncle's companion at the theatre, and on trips, and managed Arthur's affairs when he was ill. Though never formally adopted, Herbert was in many respects Arthur Sullivan's adopted son. He was at his uncle's bedside at his death in 1900.

When Arthur died, the German Emperor Wilhelm, an admirer of Sullivan's works, sent Herbert a personal message of condolence. Herbert remained friendly with his uncle's collaborator, W. S. Gilbert, after Arthur's death; when Herbert organised a Garrick Club dinner in 1908 in honour of Gilbert, the dramatist wrote, "My dear Sullivan, There is little need to tell you how deeply I appreciate the good feeling that actuated you in organizing yesterday's most successful dinner. It is an instance of friendship that can never fade from my memory". Even after Gilbert's death, Herbert remained friendly with Lady Gilbert. He was also friendly, as a youth and young man, with Lucas D'Oyly Carte (1872–1907), the brother of Rupert D'Oyly Carte.

== Later years ==
Newman Flower in 1917

After his uncle's death, Herbert Sullivan inherited the bulk of the composer's estate, including his diaries and many of his important musical manuscripts, and managed the rights to publish, perform, broadcast and record his uncle's works. He lived in Brightlingsea Manor House from 1903 until 1921; an accomplished sailor, he organised an annual regatta at the nearby Colne Yacht Club, of which he was a member. He became a member of the London Stock Exchange and Deputy of the Cinque Port of Brightlingsea. Sullivan became prominent in pro bono publico activities, and in April 1915 he contributed the manuscript of Utopia Limited by Gilbert and Sullivan to a charity auction in aid of the Red Cross. During the First World War, Herbert became a King's Messenger, using his yacht, "Zola", to deliver messages to Belgium and also to pose as a tourist, while observing German naval activities. While in this service, his ship was hit by a torpedo, and he spent hours in the freezing waters of the North Sea. Afterwards, he found walking painful and used a cane. While on his yacht, in 1921, he retrieved mail from the English Channel after an aeroplane crash. (Note: On 26 August 1921, Sullivan witnessed the crash of a Farman Goliath aircraft of SNETA into the English Channel off Calais, France, while sailing Zola. He reported the crash and retrieved a bag of mail from the sea.) In 1923 he married Elena Margarita Vincent. He served as Warden of the Worshipful Company of Musicians in 1925 and as Master of the Company in 1926.

In 1927 Sullivan collaborated with Newman Flower on a biography of Arthur Sullivan. As Sullivan and Flower had exclusive access to the composer's diaries, the biography was regarded at the time as uniquely authoritative. Subsequently, when wider access to the diaries became possible, it was seen that Sullivan had suppressed mention of his uncle's gambling and womanising, and this evasion, combined with the lack of musical analysis in the biography, led to a lowering of its status among scholars. A biography of Herbert Sullivan, by Elaine Richardson, was published in 2023.

Sullivan died suddenly in London of a heart attack in 1928, aged 60. His estate included many of his uncle's manuscripts. His widow remarried about 1929, becoming Mrs Elena M. Bashford. She died in 1957, and the manuscripts were sold at auction in 1966 by her estate, some going to museums and collectors in America and others remaining in England. Several of the autograph scores were purchased by the Gilbert and Sullivan scholar and collector Dr Terence Rees and others by dealers.

== Notes, references and sources ==
=== Sources ===
- Ainger, Michael (2002). Gilbert and Sullivan – A Dual Biography. Oxford: Oxford University Press. ISBN 0195147693.
- Allen, Reginald; Gale R. D'Luhy (1975). Sir Arthur Sullivan: Composer & Personage. New York: The Pierpont Morgan Library. ISBN 978-0-87598-049-2.
- Dark, Sidney; Rowland Grey (1923). W. S. Gilbert: His Life and Letters. London: Methuen & Co. Ltd.
- Hayes, Scott (2002). Uncle Arthur: The California Connection. Sir Arthur Sullivan Society.
- Hayes, Scott (2008). Uncle Arthur: The California Connection (2nd ed.). Sir Arthur Sullivan Society.
- Jacobs, Arthur (1992). Arthur Sullivan: A Victorian Musician (Second ed.). Portland, Oregon: Amadeus Press. ISBN 0-931340-51-9.
- Lawrence, Arthur (1899). Sir Arthur Sullivan: Life-Story, Letters, and Reminiscences. London: James Bowden.
- Richardson, Elaine (2023). The Untold Story of Herbert Sullivan. F. J. Blissett & Company. ISBN 9781905912902.
- Sullivan, Herbert; Newman Flower (1927). Sir Arthur Sullivan: His Life, Letters & Diaries. London: Cassell & Company, Ltd.
