= Samuel Rosenberg (writer) =

American writer and photographer

Samuel Rosenberg (1912 – January 5, 1996) was an American writer and photographer. He is best known for his 1974 study of Sherlock Holmes titled Naked is the Best Disguise (subtitled The Death and Resurrection of Sherlock Holmes). His other notable book is The Confessions of a Trivialist (originally published in a shorter form as The Come As You Are Masquerade Party).

== Personal life ==
He was born in Cleveland, Ohio, as the son of Jacob S. and Fanny Rosenberg. His father was a butcher and a songwriter.

Rosenberg was married to Angela Nizzardini. They had one daughter, Amber Ruth Sabri.

He weighed over 300 pounds at a height of 6 foot 3 inches. He died at age 85 in New York as a result of Parkinson's syndrome. His friend Buckminster Fuller had humorously referred to him as a "pink mountain" (rosen berg: German) and "history's most massive reader."

== Professional career ==
While in his twenties, Rosenberg migrated to New York City and found employment reading plays for a producer on Broadway. He collaborated with Jerome Weidman on a play in 1936. Subsequently, his pattern-recognition ability led to his becoming a photographer and photograph analyst for the O.S.S. during World War II. At the O.S.S. he encountered other photographers and poster artists, among them Henry Koerner, who credited Rosenberg with launching his career in 1944, with his appreciation of Koerner's first painting (My Parents I) and transforming his style in 1948-49 though close study of Giotto.

MGM employed him to search literary sources and references in order to prevent lawsuits for plagiarism. The knowledge that he gained from this activity led to the publication of his books. In these, he found hidden patterns and references that were formerly overlooked by readers.

In 1954, he was sent to Rosenlaui, Switzerland, as a photojournalist to interview Tenzing Norgay. Though he had been one of the first to successfully climb Mount Everest, Norgay had enrolled as a student in a mountaineering school. Rosenlaui's proximity to the Reichenbach Falls led Rosenberg to begin his meditations on the fictional detective Sherlock Holmes, resulting in his most popular book. That steep waterfall was the scene of Holmes's final encounter with Professor Moriarty.

=== The Confessions of a Trivialist ===
A shorter version of this 1972 book was first published as The Come As You Are Masquerade Party in 1970. Among its contents are essays on:

- The Frankenstein stories and movies
- William James Sidis, the intellectual prodigy
- The original Santa Claus
- A brief encounter with Albert Schweitzer,
- Lot's wife
- Herman Melville's private life

The essay about Sidis was given emphasis in Amy Wallace's book The Prodigy: A biography of William James Sidis, America's Greatest Child Prodigy.

=== Naked is the Best Disguise ===
Published in 1974, this book relates the Sherlock Holmes stories in surprising ways to Nietzsche, Oscar Wilde, Dionysus, Christ, Catullus, John Bunyan, Robert Browning, Boccaccio, Napoleon, Racine, Frankenstein, Flaubert, George Sand, Socrates, Poe, General Charles George Gordon, Melville, Joyce's Ulysses, T. S. Eliot, and many others. Rosenberg claimed that Doyle left open clues to his most hidden thoughts. Rosenberg also describes his discovery of the Doyle Syndrome. This repetitive narrative sequence reveals to him some deep characteristics of the author Sir Arthur Conan Doyle. The pattern is associated with illicit love and contains such sequential story elements as:

- Detective goes to scene of crime,
- He conducts a vigil,
- Reference is made to written words that refer to illicit love,
- Reference is made to severe punishment and the deaths of many people,
- Arrival of violent person,
- Reference is made to reversal of sexes,
- Physical combat.

As a result of this repeated pattern, Sherlock Holmes preserves Victorian morality.

Rosenberg's book was criticized for its irreverence toward the Holmes stories and for its unprofessional use of psychoanalysis with references to sexual activity. Rosenberg went on to write Why Freud Fainted, an essayistic psychobiography focussed on Freud's relation to Vienna and to Carl Jung.
