= Naked Is the Best Disguise =

1974 book by Samuel Rosenberg

Naked Is the Best Disguise: The Death and Resurrection of Sherlock Holmes (ISBN 0-14-004030-7) is a 1974 book by Samuel Rosenberg speculating on alleged hidden meanings in the works of Arthur Conan Doyle.

Rosenberg also examines the influence of Conan Doyle's writings on other works, especially James Joyce's Ulysses. The book argues for a surprising relationship between the Sherlock Holmes stories and Nietzsche, Oscar Wilde, Dionysus, Christ, Catullus, John Bunyan, Robert Browning, Boccaccio, Napoleon, Racine, Frankenstein, Flaubert, George Sand, Socrates, Poe, General Charles George Gordon, Melville, Joyce's Ulysses, T. S. Eliot, and many others.

The title comes from lines in William Congreve's The Double Dealer (1694).

No mask like open truth to cover lies,
As to go naked is the best disguise.

It alludes to Rosenberg's premise that Conan Doyle left clues throughout his works, revealing his innermost hidden thoughts.

Rosenberg's book was received with disdain by Sherlock Holmes enthusiasts and scholars in the 1970s. It is recognized as the first book of literary criticism about Doyle to appear in print; many other more respected works have followed.

== See also ==
- Sherlockian game
