= Jubilee Plot =

Assassination plot

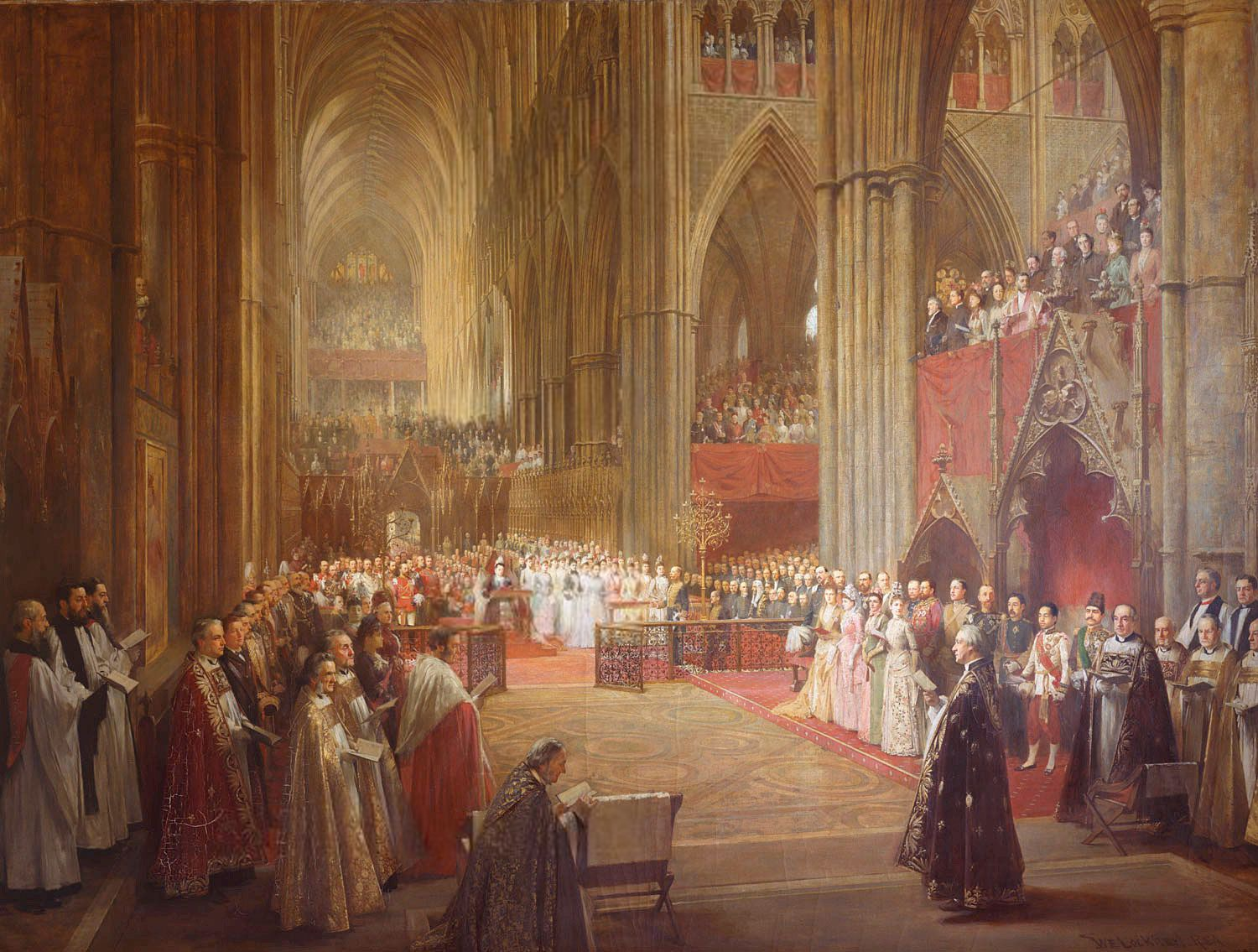
- Queen Victoria's Golden Jubilee Service, Westminster Abbey, 21 June 1887 by William Ewart Lockhart
- Date: 20 June 1887
- Location: Westminster Abbey, London, United Kingdom
- Type: Supposed assassination attempt
- Target: Queen Victoria, Westminster Abbey, British Cabinet
- Charges: Bringing dynamite into the country (Callan and Harkins)

The Jubilee Plot was a supposed assassination attempt by radical Irish nationalists on Queen Victoria during the Golden Jubilee of Queen Victoria, on 20 June 1887. Those who presented the idea of a plot claimed that the radicals intended to blow up Westminster Abbey, Queen Victoria and half the British Cabinet. The story was closely connected to a set of forged letters by Richard Pigott, which attempted to implicate Charles Stewart Parnell with supporting physical force Irish republicanism.

== Background ==
=== British agent Francis Millen ===
The organizer of the assassination attempt was later said to be Francis Millen, a member of Clan na Gael. However, he had reportedly been a spy for the British authorities for several years (from 1885 under Edward Jenkinson of the Home Office with the approval of the Prime Minister, Lord Salisbury), and was allegedly encouraged by them to proceed with the attempt, to draw in more Fenians, who could then be captured.

In June various newspapers reported that a plot to assassinate the Queen with bombs planted in Westminster Abbey had been discovered. In October 1887, a recently deceased American, Joseph Cohen, was declared by the Assistant Commissioner of the Police, James Monro, to have been the financier of the plot; he had been visited by two Irishmen, surnamed Callan and Harkins, were arrested and charged with bringing dynamite into the country; both had been followed by the police ever since their arrival in Britain in June 1887. At their trial, Monro exposed Millen as the organizer of the plot, but Millen was allowed to escape to the USA where he died under mysterious circumstances. Callan and Harkins were sentenced to fifteen years each in prison.

=== Anti-Parnell forgeries ===
Earlier in the year The Times had begun publishing a series of features called Parnellism and Crime. The bombers were linked, by letters, to Irish Parliamentary Party leader Parnell and other nationalist Irish MPs. The letters had been supplied by a Dublin journalist, Richard Pigott, purportedly showing that Parnell had approved of violent methods by extremist nationalist elements. The letters were shown to be forgeries, written by Pigott and sold to The Times. The case against Parnell collapsed. Pigott committed suicide and in a subsequent libel action The Times had to pay Parnell £5,000 damages.

According to British journalist Christy Campbell, in his book Fenian Fire: The British Government Plot to Assassinate Queen Victoria, Millen had been recruited by the British government "to stir the Fenians into bombing Britain" – a scheme designed to discredit the Home Rule movement. Campbell also claimed Millen was hired with the approval of the Conservative leader, Lord Salisbury, the Prime Minister.

== See also ==
- False flag
