= Beeton's Christmas Annual =

British paperback magazine from 1860 to 1898

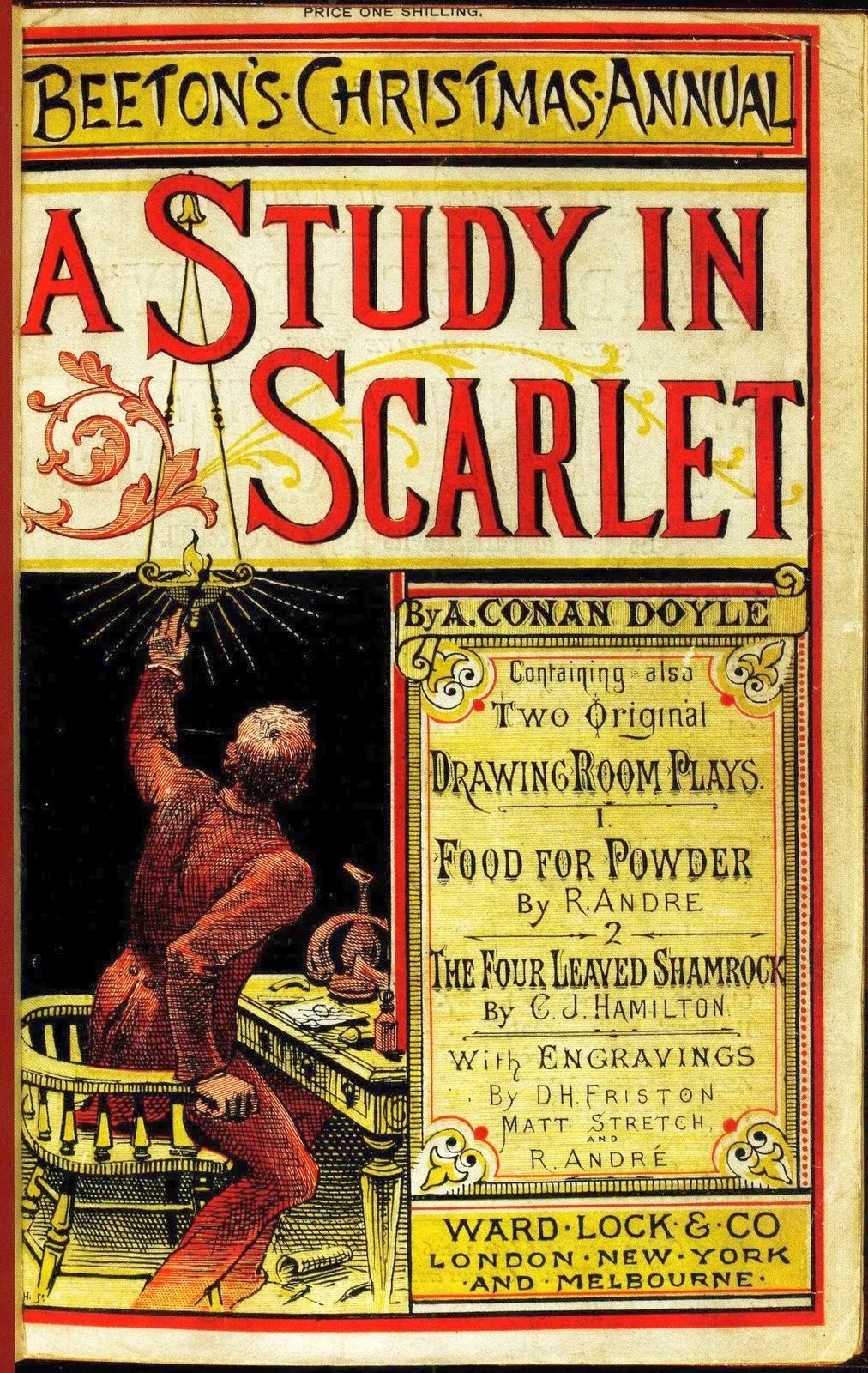
The cover page of Beeton's Christmas Annual issue which contains Arthur Conan Doyle's novel A Study in Scarlet (1887)

Beeton's Christmas Annual was a British paperback magazine printed yearly between 1860 and 1898, founded by Samuel Orchart Beeton. In 1865, the magazine was purchased by Ward, Lock & Co.

In the fall of 1886, Arthur Conan Doyle submitted A Study in Scarlet to Ward, Lock & Co., after trying several more respectable publishers. They offered to buy the copyright for £25 provided they could publish it the following year, citing a glut of "cheap fiction". They brought the novel out in the November 1887 issue of Beeton's Christmas Annual. The narrative introduced the characters Sherlock Holmes and his friend Watson.
