= The History of Spiritualism =

1926 book by Arthur Conan Doyle

- Author: Arthur Conan Doyle
- Language: English
- Subject: History of Spiritualism
- Genre: Non-fiction
- Publisher: Cassell & Co. (UK); George H. Doran Co. (US)
- Publication date: 1926
- Publication place: United Kingdom
- Media type: Print
- Pages: 2 vols.

The History of Spiritualism is a two-volume work by the British writer Arthur Conan Doyle, published in 1926 by Cassell & Co. in London and by George H. Doran Co. in New York. It traces the formation and growth of the Spiritualist movement from its forerunners in the 18th century, beginning with Emanuel Swedenborg, through the events of 1848 at Hydesville associated with the Fox sisters, up to the 1920s. The book covers mediums, scientific investigations, phenomena such as ectoplasm and spirit photography, the Spiritism of Allan Kardec in France, the impact of the First World War and the religious aspects of the movement.

Doyle wrote the book as an avowed believer, setting out to produce a history of the movement written "from the inside", in contrast to sceptical authors such as Frank Podmore and Joseph McCabe. He relied heavily on the research of the journalist W. Leslie Curnow, whose name does not appear on the title page. A favourable review in Nature in 1926 set off a controversy with scientists who pointed to the documented fraud in mediumship and to Doyle's lack of scientific method. Reissued by Cambridge University Press in 2011, the book is now read mainly as a source for the cultural history of Victorian and Edwardian Spiritualism.

== Background ==
According to Doyle himself, his investigation of psychic phenomena began in 1886. In 1887, while practising as a doctor in Southsea, he took part in table-turning sittings at the home of General Alfred Drayson; he joined the Society for Psychical Research (SPR) in 1893 and gave his first public lecture on Spiritualism in 1917. In the following years he published popular works such as The New Revelation and The Vital Message, and lectured on the subject in Australia, New Zealand, the United States, Canada and several countries in Europe and Africa.

By the time the book appeared, Doyle was one of the movement's leading public figures. On the title page he is described as honorary president of the Fédération Spirite Internationale, president of the London Spiritualist Alliance and president of the British College of Psychic Science. In February 1925 he had opened the Psychic Bookshop, a bookshop and lending library devoted to Spiritualist literature, at Abbey House in Victoria Street, near Westminster Abbey, and added a small museum a few months later. The preface of the book is dated from that address.

== Writing ==
In the preface, Doyle explains that the work grew out of separate studies, written with no plan of forming a whole, on Swedenborg, Edward Irving, Andrew Jackson Davis, the Hydesville episode, the Fox sisters, the Eddy Brothers and Daniel Dunglas Home. Realising that he had already covered much of the ground of a full history, he decided to complete it. In his view, a movement that many regarded as the most important since the time of Christ had never had a historian from among its own adherents.

Doyle also assesses earlier histories. He accuses Frank Podmore of ignoring inconvenient facts in order to attribute most physical phenomena to fraud, and calls Joseph McCabe's history, which explained everything as fraud, a travesty. He considers J. Arthur Hill's history too narrowly confined to the standpoint of psychical research, and regards the books of Emma Hardinge Britten as valuable but limited to particular phases of the movement. He describes Man's Survival After Death by the Rev. Charles L. Tweedale as an exposition of the movement's case rather than a consecutive history.

Acknowledging that the research required more time than he had, Doyle enlisted William Leslie Curnow, an Australian-born journalist living in London, a member of the SPR, assistant editor of the Spiritualist journal Light and author of The Physical Phenomena of Spiritualism: A Historical Survey (1925). According to the preface, Curnow gathered and sifted the material and sometimes supplied finished text, which Doyle used after adapting it to his own point of view; Curnow's name was left off the title page for reasons which, Doyle wrote, Curnow understood and accepted. Curnow died on 11 February 1926, a few months before publication. For this book Doyle moved from his usual publisher, Hodder and Stoughton, to Cassell. The work is dedicated to Sir Oliver Lodge, whom Doyle calls a great leader in both physical and psychic science.

== Publication ==
The book was published in June 1926 in two volumes by Cassell & Co. (London, New York, Toronto and Melbourne) and, in the United States, by George H. Doran Co. Each edition had sixteen illustrations: the frontispiece shows Kate Fox receiving an answer to her signals, and there are portraits of Swedenborg, Davis, the Fox sisters, Home, William Crookes, Alfred Russel Wallace, Doyle himself, Oliver Lodge, William Stainton Moses, Juliette Bisson, Gustave Geley and Allan Kardec, as well as a plaster cast of an "ectoplasmic hand". The index and bibliography are at the end of the second volume.

The book was reprinted by Arno Press in 1975 and, in 2011, by Cambridge University Press in the Cambridge Library Collection – Spiritualism and Esoteric Knowledge series.

== Contents ==
=== Volume I: origins and early mediums ===
Doyle acknowledges that Spiritualists usually date the beginning of their movement to 31 March 1848, but argues that "preternatural" interventions have occurred throughout recorded history. In his view, the difference is that the earlier episodes were sporadic, whereas the modern ones bore the mark of an organised "invasion" from the spirit world. He takes Swedenborg as his starting point and calls him the first and greatest of modern mediums. He separates the Swede's clairvoyant gifts (such as his vision, from Gothenburg, of a fire in Stockholm, an episode investigated by Immanuel Kant) from his theology, which he finds obscure and arbitrary. He sees in Swedenborg's descriptions of the afterlife an agreement with later mediumistic communications, and criticises the New Church for distancing itself from Spiritualism.

The following chapters present, as links between Swedenborg and Hydesville, the "gift of tongues" that broke out in 1831 in Edward Irving's London congregation and the phenomena observed from 1837 among the Shakers in the United States. Andrew Jackson Davis is presented as the "prophet of the new revelation": Doyle describes his trance dictations, suggests that he may have been inspired by Swedenborg himself, and credits him with terms and institutions later adopted by the movement, such as the "Summerland" and the Sunday schools known as Lyceums.

The Hydesville episode is central to the narrative. Doyle describes the rappings heard in the Fox family's house and the night of 31 March 1848, when the young Kate Fox challenged the unseen agent to repeat the snapping of her fingers. He also recounts the alphabetic code worked out by neighbours and the claim that the communicator was a pedlar who had been murdered in the house. In covering the sisters' later careers, he discusses Margaret Fox's public confession in 1888 that she herself had produced the raps, and her retraction published in November 1889. He attributes the confession to family quarrels, especially with her elder sister Leah, and to pressure from opponents of the movement.

The rest of the volume follows the spread of the movement in the United States and England and the careers of Home, the Davenport brothers, the Eddy brothers, Henry Slade and Francis Monck, together with the investigations of William Crookes between 1870 and 1874. The last chapter examines collective investigations such as those of the London Dialectical Society (1869–1870), the Seybert Commission (1884) and the Institut Général Psychologique (1905–1908). Doyle argues that such committees tended to fail because investigators who ignored the conditions required by the phenomena interfered with their own results.

Chapters of Volume I
No.	Title	Subject
I	The Story of Swedenborg	Emanuel Swedenborg as a forerunner
II	Edward Irving: The Shakers	Edward Irving's congregation and the Shakers
III	The Prophet of the New Revelation	Andrew Jackson Davis
IV	The Hydesville Episode	The events of 1848 at Hydesville
V	The Career of the Fox Sisters	The Fox sisters
VI	First Developments in America	The spread of the movement in the United States
VII	The Dawn in England	The arrival of the movement in England
VIII	Continued Progress in England	Its growth in England
IX	The Career of D. D. Home	Daniel Dunglas Home
X	The Davenport Brothers	The Davenport brothers
XI	The Researches of Sir William Crookes (1870–1874)	The investigations of William Crookes, including the "Katie King" sittings with Florence Cook
XII	The Eddy Brothers and the Holmeses	The Eddy Brothers and the Holmes couple
XIII	Henry Slade and Dr. Monck	Henry Slade and Francis Ward Monck
XIV	Collective Investigations of Spiritualism	Committees of investigation

=== Volume II: psychical research, phenomena and doctrine ===
The second volume opens with Eusapia Palladino, whom Doyle presents as the first physical medium to be examined by a large number of scientists, among them Cesare Lombroso, Charles Richet and Oliver Lodge. He admits that Palladino sometimes resorted to tricks, but argues that this did not invalidate her phenomena as a whole. In the chapter on the Society for Psychical Research, he credits the society's work on telepathy and on the medium Leonora Piper, but criticises what he describes as its supercilious attitude towards Spiritualism and its barren results in the study of physical phenomena. The chapters on phenomena deal with ectoplasm, spirit photography, and voice mediumship and paraffin moulds. In the chapter on photography, which runs from William Mumler to William Hope and the so-called Crewe Circle, Doyle defends the authenticity of Hope's photographs, which had been challenged in 1922 by the investigator Harry Price.

The chapter on France, Germany and Italy summarises the life and works of Allan Kardec. Doyle identifies belief in reincarnation as the distinguishing feature of French Spiritism, which Kardec named spiritisme to distinguish it from Spiritualism, and notes that English Spiritualists were divided on the question. He also reports criticisms by Alexander Aksakov, who held that Kardec favoured writing mediums and presented reincarnation as a dogma, and a sarcastic remark by D. D. Home on the subject. He then gives his own conclusion that the balance of evidence shows reincarnation to be a fact, though not necessarily a universal one. He also praises French Spiritist writers, especially Gabriel Delanne and Léon Denis, alongside researchers such as Geley, Camille Flammarion and Richet.

The chapter on the war rejects the claim that Doyle's and Lodge's commitment to Spiritualism stemmed from grief over the loss of their sons in the conflict. In the chapter on the religious aspect, Doyle presents Spiritualism as a body of facts that can be reconciled with any religion and is irreconcilable only with materialism. He argues that the churches had failed to provide proof of a future life, and closes the work by presenting Spiritualism as the greatest religious movement in two thousand years. The final chapter describes the afterlife as portrayed in Spiritualist communications, with successive spheres and a gradual progression of the spirit, which Doyle considers more reasonable than traditional images of heaven and hell.

Chapters of Volume II
No.	Title	Subject
XV	The Career of Eusapia Palladino	Eusapia Palladino
XVI	Great Mediums from 1870 to 1900	Charles H. Foster, Elizabeth d'Espérance, William Eglinton and William Stainton Moses
XVII	The Society for Psychical Research	The Society for Psychical Research
XVIII	Ectoplasm	Ectoplasm
XIX	Spirit Photography	Spirit photography
XX	Voice Mediumship and Moulds	Voice mediumship and paraffin moulds
XXI	French, German, and Italian Spiritualism	Allan Kardec, reincarnation and the movement in continental Europe
XXII	Some Great Modern Mediums	Early 20th-century mediums such as Gladys Osborne Leonard, Vout Peters, Etta Wriedt and Ada Besinnet
XXIII	Spiritualism and the War	Spiritualism and the First World War
XXIV	The Religious Aspect of Spiritualism	Spiritualism as a religion
XXV	The After-Life as Seen by Spiritualists	The afterlife according to Spiritualists

== Reception ==
On 31 July 1926, Nature published a review by the entomologist R. J. Tillyard which, while describing Spiritualism as a cult or religion, was predominantly favourable to the investigation of the phenomena. The review prompted a series of letters in the journal that ran until the end of 1926. The engineer A. A. Campbell Swinton pointed to the documented fraud in mediumship and to Doyle's unscientific approach, and J. P. Lotsy, Bryan Donkin and E. J. Dingwall also took part. In his reply, Tillyard distinguished psychical research from Spiritualism and wrote that looking for the elements of the former in Doyle's book would be like a would-be chemist starting from a history of alchemy. Doyle himself wrote to the journal in defence of his position.

When it reissued the book in 2011, Cambridge University Press described it as an influential history and a valuable source for understanding Victorian and early 20th-century culture and the enthusiasm and controversies generated by Spiritualism.

== Aftermath ==
Doyle continued to campaign for Spiritualism until his death in July 1930. His disagreements with psychical researchers, already evident in the book's chapter on the SPR, came to a head in March 1930, when he resigned from the society after 36 years of membership. The immediate cause was a review by Theodore Besterman in the Journal of the Society for Psychical Research of a book about séances held at the castle of Millesimo, Italy, with the medium Marquis Carlo Centurione Scotto. Doyle considered the review insulting to Ernesto Bozzano, who had attended the sittings.

== Editions and translations ==
=== English ===
- The History of Spiritualism. 2 vols. London: Cassell & Co., 1926.
- The History of Spiritualism. 2 vols. New York: George H. Doran Co., 1926.
- The History of Spiritualism. 2 vols. New York: Arno Press, 1975 (reprint).
- The History of Spiritualism. 2 vols. Cambridge: Cambridge University Press, 2011 (Cambridge Library Collection). ISBN 978-1-108-03320-6 (vol. 1); ISBN 978-1-108-03321-3 (vol. 2).

=== Translations ===
- Portuguese: História do Espiritismo. Translated by Júlio Abreu Filho. São Paulo: O Pensamento, 1960 (single volume). A new translation by Euclides Luiz Calloni was published by Pensamento in 2023.
- Russian: История спиритизма (Istoriya spiritizma), also published as История спиритуализма, with editions in 1998, 2010 and 2015.

== See also ==
- Spiritualism (movement)
- Fox sisters
- Spirit photography
- The Land of Mist, Doyle's Spiritualist novel published the same year
- The Vital Message
