= Alfred Wilks Drayson =

English army officer, author, astronomer (1827–1901)

Alfred Wilks Drayson (also Wilkes) (1827–1901) was an English army officer, writer and astronomer. He was a personal friend of Arthur Conan Doyle, who dedicated to him the short story collection The Captain of the Polestar.

== Background ==
Born 17 April 1827, he was one of a large family, son of William Drayson who worked at the Royal Gunpowder Factory, and was Clerk of the Works there in 1832, and his wife Ann Marie. He was a younger brother of the novelist Caroline Agnes Drayson, and brother-in-law of the novelist John Richardson who married the second daughter Maria Caroline, and was born at Waltham Abbey where the factory was located. Another sister, Louisa, married Samuel Burdon Ellis as his second wife, and was mother of Alfred Burdon Ellis. The fourth surviving daughter, Helen Matilda, married Charles Davies in 1848. Further sisters were Emily (1811–1894), who married William Woods (died 1856) of Woolwich Dockyard; and Laurette, christened 1819.

The second son of the family was Henry Edwin Drayson, in partnership at Faversham to 1843 with Frederick Drayson, as civil engineers and surveyors. He later visited Lammot du Pont I in the USA.

== Life and career ==
The family home, which had been at Chatham since 1835 when William Drayson retired, broke up in 1837 when Ann Marie died. Alfred Drayson was educated at Rochester Grammar School from age 11, for two years. He was then withdrawn, after an attack of scarlet fever, spending time as a convalescent with his elder brother, a civil engineer.

Drayson graduated in 1846 at the Royal Military Academy, Woolwich. Commissioned, he then served in the Seventh Xhosa War. He rose through the ranks of the Royal Artillery, being promoted captain in 1854, on his return from South Africa; major in 1868; lieutenant-colonel in 1869, and colonel in 1874. He was in India around 1877, and was based at Halifax, Nova Scotia for five years.

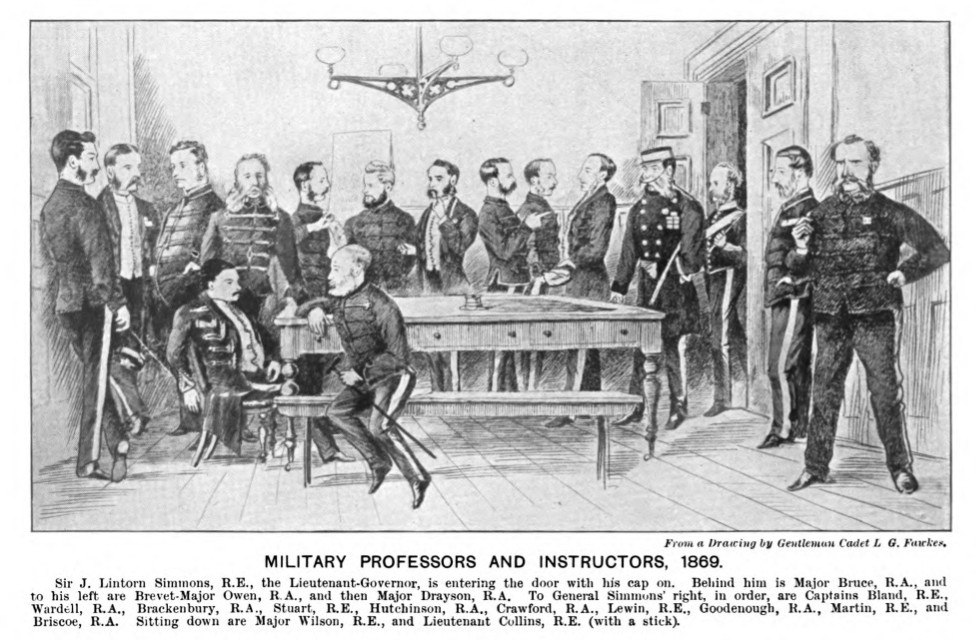
Group of Woolwich instructors, 1869, with Alfred Wilks Drayson on the extreme right

From 1858 to 1873 Drayson was on the Military Topography staff at the Royal Military Academy, Woolwich, serving as Professor of Surveying and Topographical Drawing. He retired from the army in 1883 with the honorary rank of major-general, and became president of the Portsmouth Literary and Scientific Society.

Drayston died in Portsmouth on 27 September 1901.

== Interests ==
A member of White's Club, Drayson played billiards and related games including pyramid pool. He was a reputed player of whist, and an author on a well-known book on the subject.

=== Spiritualism ===
Drayson attended a séance with the medium Annie Andrews in 1857, and she claimed to put him in touch with his dead brother. It was the start of a long series of such meetings. In 1862 Drayson met Georgina Cowper through Andrews. In 1864 Drayson and Andrews assisted the medium Mrs. Mary Marshall at a séance attended by John Ruskin. It was held at the home of Mrs Makdougal Gregory, widow of William Gregory. More than one séance at this time involved Drayson and Ruskin; at the first, the homeopath John Rutherford Russell was also present. Drayson in May 1864 saw Ruskin and the Cowpers socially. He investigated the supposed haunted Clamps-in-the-Wood, Staffordshire, prompted by a story of a friend, William Howitt.

Elisabeth Nichol also sat as a medium for Drayson, in 1867; and he was a member of the Spiritual Athenæum of Daniel Dunglas Home, whose séances he had attended, set up in that year. He joined the British National Association of Spiritualists, shortly after its founding in 1873. He showed spirit photographs in 1874 at Broadlands, clashing there with the sceptic John Morley. He was a member of the Society for Psychical Research, and was brought onto the council of the London Spiritualist Alliance by the autocratic Stainton Moses.

In 1882 Drayson was living in Southsea, and in subsequent years investigated psychic phenomena there, with Conan Doyle. He also introduced Conan Doyle to theosophy and to Alfred Percy Sinnett. Conan Doyle later reported, in his History of Spiritualism, the claim that Drayson in the 1880s was receiving a large number of apports through a medium. He retained a sceptical view of this claim, being more convinced by other aspects of Drayson's spiritualism.

=== Astronomy and Earth science ===
Drayson published scientific theories, not accepted by later authors. These included discussion of the obliquity of the ecliptic. He was elected Fellow of the Royal Astronomical Society in 1868. While related ideas were put forward by Thomas Belt, the theoretical basis for large tilts in the Earth's axis was undermined by 1880, with work of George Darwin.

In 1884, in the weekly Light: A Journal of Psychical, Occult, and Mystical Research, he published a paper The Solution of Scientific Problems by Spirits on the moons of Uranus, relating a conclusion given by a medium in a séance of 1858. It was later contested by Camille Flammarion.

After Drayson's death, his views were defended by Algernon Frederick Rous de Horsey in Draysonia (1911), and others.

== Works ==
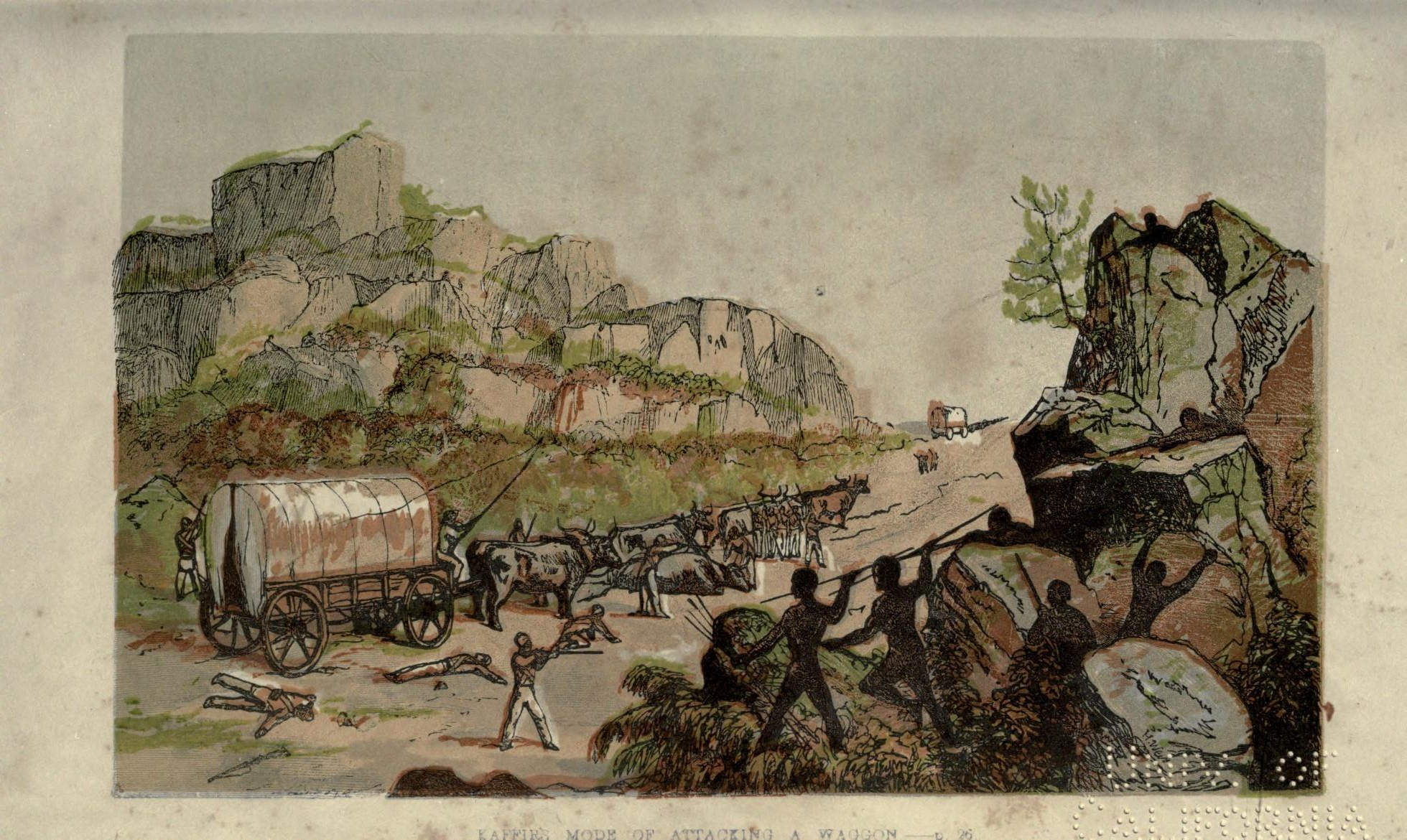
Illustration by Harrison Weir from Sporting Scenes amongst the Kaffirs of South Africa (1858)

Drayson published:

- Sporting Scenes amongst the Kaffirs of South Africa (1858)
- The Earth We Inhabit: its past, present, and probable future (1859), put forward an expanding Earth theory. Some background is given by Augustus De Morgan in his Budget of Paradoxes, including the prospect of telegraph cables breaking. Such breaks were known with Atlantic cables, but are now attributed to underwater mudslides. A contemporary with a related theory was William Lowthian Green.
- Great Britain has been and will be again within the Tropics (1859), introduced his "second rotation" theory. The Eclectic Review called the book "pseudo-science".
- Practical Military Surveying and Sketching (1861)
- Tales at the Outspan (1862)
- The Common Sights in the Heavens (1862)
- The Young Dragoon; or, Every day life of a soldier, by one who has served (1870, anonymous)
- On the Cause, Date, and Duration of the Last Glacial Epoch of Geology, and the Probable Antiquity of Man: With an Investigation and Description of a New Movement of the Earth (1873), postulated a 30,000 year cycle with large variation of the Earth's axial tilt.
- The Cause of the supposed Proper Motion of the Fixed Stars and an explanation of the Apparent Acceleration of the Moon's Mean Motion (1874)
- The Gentleman Cadet: His Career and Adventures at the Royal Military Academy, Woolwich (1875)
- Among the Zulus: The Adventures of Hans Sterk, South African Hunter and Pioneer (1879)
- Experiences of a Woolwich Professor (1886), includes views on phrenology
- The Art of Practical Whist (1886)
- "The White Chief of the Umzimvubu Caffres" from Everyboy's Annual, in book form The White Chief of the Caffres (1887), was paraphrased by Mervyn Peake as part of an early story, published in Peake's Progress (1979).
- Thirty Thousand Years of the Earth's Past History Read by Aid of the Discovery of the Second Rotation of the Earth (1888)
- From Keeper to Captain: Being the Adventures of G. Cooperson During his Career in the Dragoons (1889)
- The Diamond Hunters of South Africa (1889), illustrations by Arnold W. Cooper.
- The Art of Practical Billiards for Amateurs (1889)
- Untrodden Ground in Astronomy and Geology (1890), returned to Drayson's "second rotation" theory, and influenced A Journey in Other Worlds of 1894.

Drayson also contributed to the Boy's Own Paper.

== Patents ==
Drayson was granted, with Charles Richard Binney, an 1858 patent for improvements to underwater telegraph cables. The invention, the "Elongating Tunnel Marine Telegraph", was a helical wire in india rubber, to protect against longitudinal strain. In 1868 he was granted one for "an improved mode of and apparatus for cooling wort and other liquids". He proposed to use carbon disulphide, rather than water, for rapid cooling.

== In literature ==
Conan Doyle's villain Professor Moriarty has been considered a compound of Drayson, Adam Worth and the forger James Seward. Schaefer, who sees Simon Newcomb as a model for Moriarty, argues that the link from Conan Doyle to Newcomb runs through Drayson and Newcomb's formula on axial tilt, Drayson resenting Newcomb's lack of interest in his own work on the subject; and he regards Drayson as a model for Colonel Moran.

== Family ==
Drayson married in 1852 Mary Catherine Preece, fourth daughter of Richard Matthias Preece, and elder sister of William Henry Preece. Their elder daughter Ellen Mary Isabel married in 1881 Alfred Edward Wrottesley, son of Edward Bennet Wrottesley, and grandson of Sir John Wrottesley, 1st Baron Wrottesley.
