= William Curnow =

Australian journalist (1832–1903)

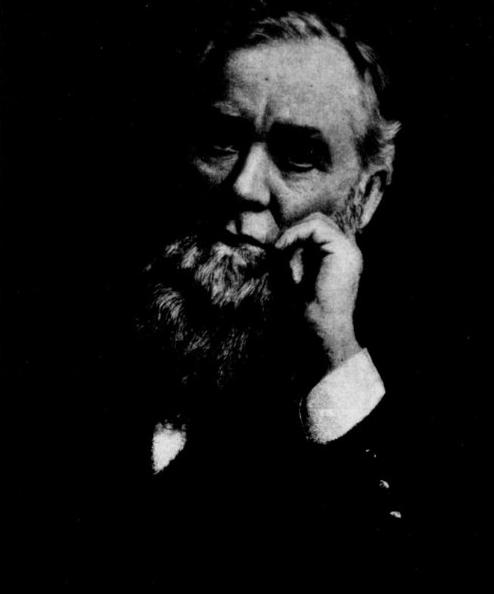
- William Curnow
- Born: 2 December 1832; St Ives, Cornwall, United Kingdom
- Died: 14 October 1903 (aged 70); Enmore, New South Wales, Australia
- Resting place: Rookwood Cemetery
- Occupations: Journalist, Methodist minister
- Years active: 1854–1903
- Employer: The Sydney Morning Herald
- Known for: Editor of The Sydney Morning Herald
- Notable work: The Sydney Mail, The Sydney Morning Herald
- Spouse: Matilda Susanna Weiss (m. 1858)
- Children: 4, including William Leslie Curnow

William Curnow (1832 – 14 October 1903) was a Cornish Australian journalist, and Methodist minister, and was editor of The Sydney Morning Herald for 15 years.

== Early life ==
Curnow was baptised on 2 December 1832 at St Ives, Cornwall, United Kingdom, the son of James Curnow, a tin miner, and his wife Jane, née Hallow. As a child he competed in a recitation contest at a local Methodist chapel in which he beat a young Henry Irving who at that time was still known by the surname Brodribb. At the time of the United Kingdom Census 1851, when he was 18, Curnow was working as a tin miner. He trained for the Wesleyan Methodist ministry, before emigrating to Australia in 1854.

== Ministry ==
Arriving in Sydney on 23 May 1854 with fellow Cornishman and minister William Kelynack, he served as minister at Newcastle, Maitland, Parramatta and Bowenfels. It was in Parramatta where he married Matilda Susanna Weiss, daughter of a Sydney businessman, on 16 March 1858. In 1859 he was transferred to the Brisbane and Ipswich circuit in Queensland, but was recalled to Sydney in 1862. For three years Curnow was minister for the York street Church, the principal place of worship of the Sydney Wesleyans, and another three years were spent at Bourke Street. In 1868 he went to Goulburn, before returning to York street in 1871. In March 1874 he left for a trip to the United Kingdom. When he returned Curnow initially ministered in Forest Lodge, however his throat had become adversely affected by public speaking and he finally resigned in 1886.

== Journalism ==
Curnow was joint editor of the Christian Advocate and Wesleyan Record with William Kelynack from 1864 to 1868 and 1871–73. From 1873 he contributed articles to the Sydney Morning Herald, and John Fairfax highly appreciated his work. On Curnow's return from abroad, in 1875, Fairfax invited him to become a member of the editorial staff. He edited The Sydney Mail for five months in 1885 and on 1 January 1886 he succeeded Andrew Garran as editor of the Sydney Morning Herald.

He retired in 1903 in failing health, and died aged 70 of cerebrovascular disease at his home at Clifton, Cambridge street, Enmore on 14 October 1903 and was buried in Rookwood Cemetery.

== Family ==
He was survived by his wife, two sons and two daughters. His wife, with Maybanke Anderson and Louisa Macdonald, helped to establish free kindergartens and was a founder of the Women's Literary Society and of The Women's College, University of Sydney. Curnow Place, in the Canberra suburb of Chisholm, is named in her honour. His youngest son William Leslie Curnow became a journalist working with the Sydney Morning Herald and the London Times but is chiefly remembered for his work with Sir Arthur Conan Doyle on researching and writing about Spiritualism.
