= Samuel Ingleby Oddie =

Samuel Ingleby Oddie (1870 - 8 May 1945) was an English surgeon, barrister and coroner.

== Life ==
He was born Samuel Oddie to Jane and Ripley Oddie in Pateley Bridge and educated at the private Tettenhall School in Wolverhampton and the University of Edinburgh. He qualified from the latter as a medical doctor in 1891 and spent time as a naval surgeon then in private practice in Surrey. Neither of these being to his liking, he decided to turn his hobby of criminal law and common law into a profession, studying the law before being called to the Bar in 1901 at Middle Temple.

In the meantime, in 1894, he married Lillian Brown (died 1956) in Harrogate, on the same occasion adding his own mother's maiden name to his surname. They moved to live in Croxley Green sometime between the marriage and the 1901 census. Their only child was Ripley (1902–1959). In 1903 he became a founder member of Arthur Conan Doyle's Crimes Club, Oddie having first suggested such a thing to writer and journalist Arthur Lambton on discovering a mutual love of criminology whilst both men were in Naples in 1891.

In his new profession he entered Sir Richard Muir's chambers and was junior counsel for the prosecution in the trial of Hawley Harvey Crippen in 1910. However, two years after that trial he switched profession again, this time to be coroner for the City of Westminster and south-west London. In that role he presided at almost 30,000 inquests, only retiring in December 1939. From 1925 to 1927 he was president of the Coroners' Society of England and Wales, a period which included the passage of the Coroners (Amendment) Act 1926.

In 1934 he presided over an inquest into a road death, positing that increased motor traffic would eventually lead to bicycles being banned during rush hour. He published his memoir, Inquest, in 1941 and died at Croxley Green four years later. He, his wife and son are all buried at Pateley Bridge.
