= Ada Besinnet =

American spiritualist medium

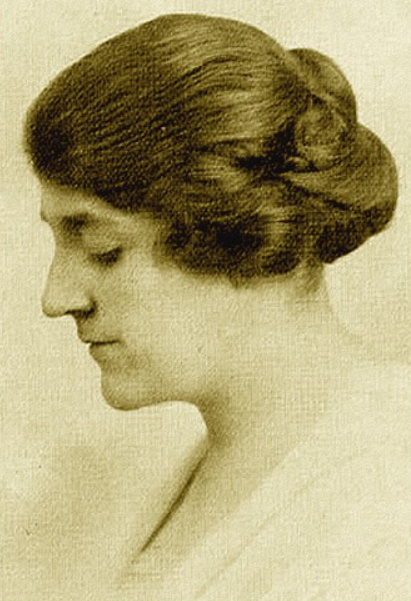
Ada Besinnet

Ada Maud Besinnet Roche (1890–1936), also known as Ada Bessinet, was an American spiritualist medium.

== Career ==
Besinnet was known for materializing 'phantom' faces, producing voices and 'psychic' lights in her séances. Psychical researchers were convinced that all her phenomena were fraudulent, but some suggested she may have been in a dissociated state. Researchers found the phantom faces suspicious, commenting that they had a strong resemblance to her face.

Besinnet refused to sit with the magician Harry Houdini. She had been exposed as a fraud by an undercover magician, Fulton Oursler. During the séance, he heard the medium leave her chair, moved his shoe over the seat, and discovered she was not there. In his exposure, Oursler wrote that Besinnet had easily performed the phenomenon herself by getting up and moving around the room and making noises. He had studied ventriloquism and stated all the voices were her own. As for the faces and lights, he suggested they were masks and observed a flashlight and, on another occasion, a rag in her hand.

Besinnet was also caught cheating by psychical researcher James Hewat McKenzie. In response, Besinnet claimed she was unconscious in her séances and had no knowledge of the events that took place. Hereward Carrington, who investigated Besinnet, wrote that "my own sittings with this medium left me entirely unconvinced of their genuineness."

In Toledo, Ohio, the spiritualist Arthur Conan Doyle attended séances with Besinnet and claimed the faces were of his mother and nephew. Doyle endorsed her as a genuine materialization medium. This was disputed by other researchers who noted Besinnet had already been caught utilizing tricks by Oursler, but Doyle had ignored the exposure.Psychical researcher J. Malcolm Bird, who had attended a séance with Doyle, was also sceptical and concluded, "I saw these particular apparitions almost as well as well as he did... they were not sufficiently clear to be identified at all, save by a liberal contribution of desire and imagination."

James H. Hyslop of the American Society for Psychical Research concluded after attending 70 sittings that Besinnet was responsible for all the phenomena during the séances. Still, her trance control was a "secondary personality."
