= Francis Ward Monck =

British clergyman and spiritualist medium (1842–?)

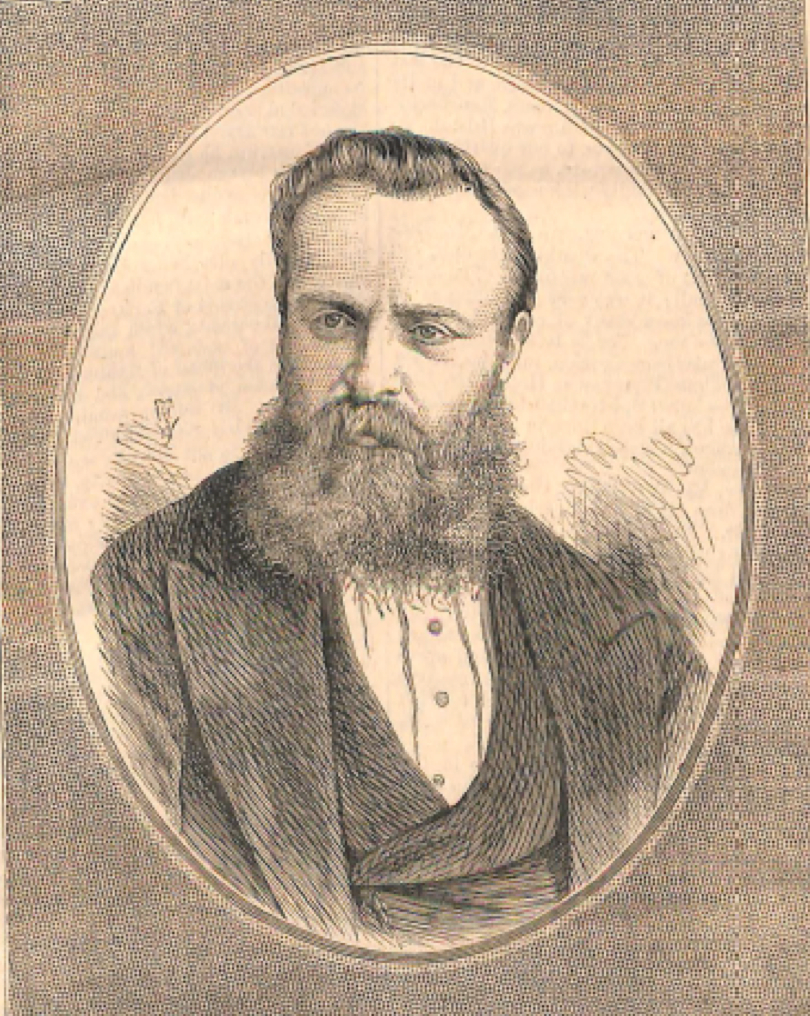
Francis Ward Monck

Francis Ward Monck (1842 – ?) was a British clergyman and spiritualist medium who was exposed as a fraud.

== Biography ==
Monck was born in Portsmouth, Hampshire. He claimed to have psychic experiences as a child. He was a clergyman who began his career as a minister of the Baptist Chapel in Earls Barton, he was interested in spiritualism and became a medium. On 3 November 1876, in Huddersfield a sitter named H. B. Lodge stopped the séance and demanded that Monck be searched. Monck ran from the room, locked himself in another room and escaped out of a window. A pair of stuffed gloves was found in his room, as well as cheesecloth, reaching rods and other fraudulent devices in his luggage. After a trial Monck was convicted for his fraudulent mediumship and was sentenced to three months in prison.

The physicist William F. Barrett also caught Monck in fraud with "a piece of white muslin on a wire frame with a black thread attached, being used by the medium to simulate a partially materialised spirit." In his séances Monck placed a musical clock on a table, covered it with a cigar- box, and claimed spirits caused it to play. It was exposed as a trick as Monck had hidden a small music box that he would play in his trousers.

Monck left for Brooklyn in the United States to ply his trade, where he was well known up until at least 1883.

== Colley wager ==
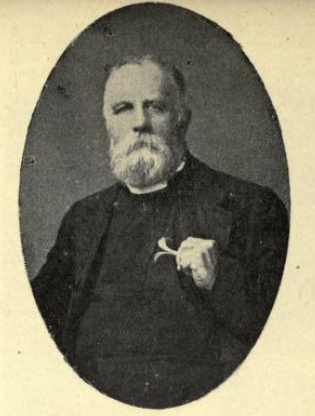
Thomas Colley

The psychical researcher Thomas Colley defended Monck. In 1906, Colley offered £1000 to anyone who could reproduce Colley's materialization by fraudulent methods. The magician John Nevil Maskelyne offered to replicate the materialization. He had managed to successfully imitate the materialization but Colley denied that it was an exact replication. Maskelyne also accused Colley of falsely pretending to be an archdeacon, whilst not receiving an official degree. These accusations were denied by Colley. The case went to court in 1907 and Alfred Russel Wallace testified on behalf of Colley and Monck. The trial lasted less than a week. Maskelyne did not get to collect the money. He also had to pay a £75 fine for libel.
