= William Leslie Curnow =

Australian-born journalist and spiritualist

W. Leslie Curnow
- Born: 1 January 1867; Sydney
- Died: 11 February 1926 (aged 59); London, England
- Education: Newington College; University of Sydney
- Occupation: Journalist
- Parent(s): Matilda Susanna and William Curnow

William Leslie Curnow (1867 – 11 February 1926) was an Australian-born journalist and spiritualist who wrote for the Sydney Morning Herald and the London Times. He is chiefly remembered for his involvement with Sir Arthur Conan Doyle's famous two-volume work The History of Spiritualism.

== Birth and education ==
Curnow was the youngest son of Matilda Susanna Curnow née Weiss (1829–1921) and William Curnow (1832–1903) and was born in Sydney, Australia. As he had the same first name as his father and followed in his father's footsteps as a journalist he used his second given name, Leslie, to differentiate himself from his father. His father was the editor of the Sydney Morning Herald for 15 years. His mother foundered the Optimists' Club of New South Wales. With Maybanke Anderson and Louisa Macdonald she helped establish free kindergartens and was a founder of the Women's Literary Society and The Women's College, University of Sydney. He was educated at Newington College commencing in 1882. On completion of his school years he matriculated in March 1887. Curnow went up to the University of Sydney where he graduated with a Bachelor of Arts in 1890 taking the MacCallum Prize for literature.

== Career ==
Upon graduation, he became a journalist at the Sydney Morning Herald until moving to London in 1913 and joining the staff of the London Times. He became a member of the Society for Psychical Research and was assistant editor of the spiritualist journal Light. He contributed articles to a variety of psychic periodicals and wrote several books, most notably The physical phenomena of spiritualism. Curnow died in London in 1925.
