= Alfred Burdon Ellis =

British army officer and ethnographer (1852–1894)

- Born: January 10, 1852; Woolwich, London, England
- Died: March 5, 1894 (aged 42); Tenerife, Canary Islands
- Military career
- Allegiance: United Kingdom
- Branch: British Army
- Service years: 1872–1894
- Rank: Colonel
- Unit: 1st West India Regiment
- Conflicts: Third Anglo-Ashanti War; Anglo-Zulu War; Capture of Tambi (1892); Taking of Toniataba (1892); Waiima incident (1893)
- Awards: Companion of the Order of the Bath (CB)
- Other work: Ethnographer and author

Alfred Burdon Ellis (10 January 1852 – 5 March 1894) was a British Army officer and ethnographer, known for his writings on West Africa.

== Life ==
The son of Lieutenant-general Samuel Burdon Ellis and his wife Louisa Drayson, daughter of the governor of Waltham Abbey factory, was born at Bowater House, Woolwich, on 10 January 1852. He was educated at the Royal Naval School, New Cross, entering the army as sub-lieutenant in the 34th Foot on 2 November 1872. He became lieutenant in the 1st West India Regiment on 12 November 1873. With them he was ordered to Ashanti, and arrived at the Gold Coast in December 1873, beginning a long connection with West Africa. He served through the Third Anglo-Ashanti War, receiving the medal.

Ellis was temporarily employed as civil commandant during the early part of 1874 at Seccondee on the Gold Coast; he was recalled to military duty in May 1874. In 1875, he paid a visit to Monrovia, and the following year he spent mostly in the West Indies. In March 1877 he visited the Gambia on his way to Sierra Leone, where his regiment was now ordered. He went on leave to England that summer, and on 27 October 1877 was seconded for service with the Gold Coast constabulary. He was sent to survey the country around Mankessim, capital of the Fante country. In January 1878 he went to act as district commissioner at Keta, and in October and November of that year conducted operations of constabulary against the Anlo people.

Wounded, Ellis was ordered back to Accra in December 1878. He objected, claiming to have checked smuggling. On 2 July 1879 he became captain of the 1st West India Regiment. Sent on special service to Zululand, he was attached to the intelligence department during the Anglo-Zulu War. In October he left South Africa and towards the close of this year visited Whydah in Dahomey.

In the spring of 1880, Ellis travelled to Lagos, and on to Bonny and Old Calabar, returning to Sierra Leone in January 1881. He was ordered to the Gold Coast with his regiment, on a threat of war with the Ashantis; on 2 February 1881 he arrived at Cape Coast, and on 8 February was ordered to garrison Annamaboe with 100 men. The alert passed, and he left his position on 20 March, remaining for some time on the Gold Coast in command of the troops.

On 13 February 1884 Ellis was promoted major; in 1886 he was again in command of the troops on the Gold Coast. In 1889 he went with part of his regiment to the Bahamas, and remained in command of the troops there till he became lieutenant-colonel on 4 February 1891. He then returned to West Africa, and stationed at Freetown, Sierra Leone was placed in command of all the troops on the west coast; on 2 March 1892 he received the local rank of colonel in West Africa. For a short spell in May 1892 he administered the government of Sierra Leone in the absence of the governor.

In June 1892 Ellis took a punitive expedition to the Tambaka country in the Sierra Leone protectorate (now on the border with Guinea), and captured Tambi. Directly afterwards he was called to the Gambia to undertake operations which ended in the taking of Toniataba, held by a supporter of Fodi Kabba, who ran a Marabout campaign in the area. The diplomatic context was an agreement with the French on pacification of the area. For his conduct Ellis received the C.B. (9 August 1892) and the West African medal with special clasp.

At the end of 1893 Ellis was asked to conduct an expedition against the Malian Sofas fighting for Samori Ture. In its course occurred the armed clash at Waiima, Kono District, Sierra Leone when British and French forces fired on each other, causing fatalities. On returning from this expedition he was struck down by fever, and on 16 February went to Tenerife to recover; but died there on 5 March 1894.

== Works ==
From 1871 to 1882 Ellis made use of opportunities to visit islands off the western coast of Africa. From 1882 onwards most of his spare time was spent on studies of African ethnology and language. His works, all published in London, were:

- West African Sketches, 1881.
- The Land of Fetish, 1883.
- A History of the West India Regiment, 1885.
- West African Islands, 1885.
- South African Sketches, 1887.
- The Tshi-speaking Peoples of the Gold Coast of West Africa, 1887.
- The Ewe-speaking Peoples of the Slave Coast, 1890.
- A History of the Gold Coast, 1893.
- The Yoruba-speaking People of the Slave Coast of West Africa, 1894.

== Family ==
Ellis married, on 5 June 1871, Emma, daughter of Philip King, and left four children.
