= Richard Milner (historian) =

American historian

Richard Milner is an American historian of science and a singer who stars in the musical, Charles Darwin: Live & in Concert.

== Publications ==
- Milner, Richard (2009). Darwin's universe : evolution from A to Z. Berkeley: University of California Press. ISBN 9780520243767. OCLC 244293205.
- Milner, Richard (2024). Jay Matternes : Paleoartist and Wildlife painter. New York: Abbeville Press. ISBN 9780789214805.
