= Arthur Conan Doyle =

British writer and physician (1859–1930)

Sir Arthur Conan Doyle KStJ DL
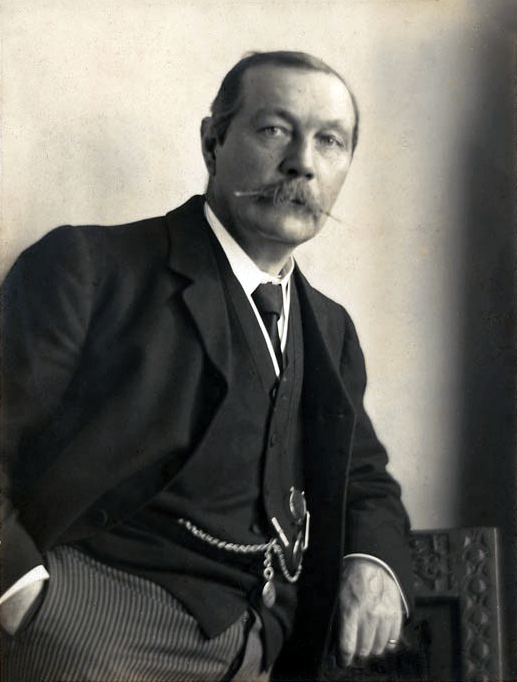
- Doyle in 1914
- Born: 22 May 1859; Edinburgh, Scotland
- Died: 7 July 1930 (aged 71); Crowborough, Sussex, England
- Education: University of Edinburgh
- Occupations: Writer; physician
- Spouse: Louisa Hawkins (m. 1885; died 1906) Jean Leckie (m. 1907)
- Children: 5, including Adrian and Jean
- Parent: Charles Altamont Doyle (father)
- Writing career
- Genres: Detective fiction; fantasy; science fiction; historical novels; non-fiction
- Notable works: Stories of Sherlock Holmes; The Lost World
- Website: conandoyleestate.com

Sir Arthur Ignatius Conan Doyle (22 May 1859 – 7 July 1930) was a British writer and physician. He is best known for his four novels and fifty-six short stories about the fictional consulting detective Sherlock Holmes and his assistant Dr. Watson, which are milestones in crime fiction, and for his first work featuring Professor Challenger, The Lost World (1912), which gave its name to a subgenre of speculative fiction. He was a prolific writer who produced over 200 stories and articles, four volumes of poetry, and a number of works for the stage. He was knighted by King Edward VII in the 1902 Coronation Honours.

Born in Edinburgh, Doyle published his earliest stories whilst studying medicine at the University of Edinburgh Medical School, and he served as a doctor and surgeon on two sea voyages before establishing an unsuccessful medical practice in Portsmouth. His time at sea inspired the short story "J. Habakuk Jephson's Statement" (1884), which popularised the mystery of the Mary Celeste. His first Sherlock Holmes work, the novel A Study in Scarlet, was published in 1887, and the short story "A Scandal in Bohemia" (1891) was the first of twenty-four monthly Holmes stories published in The Strand Magazine, for which Doyle became one of the most famous and well-paid authors of his time. His ambivalence towards the character led to Holmes's being killed off in "The Final Problem" (1893); but public outcry resulted in his return in The Hound of the Baskervilles (1901), and Doyle continued to write stories featuring him up to 1927. He was also known for his humorous stories about the Napoleonic soldier Brigadier Gerard.

Doyle was involved in political activism throughout his life and twice stood unsuccessfully for Parliament. He wrote in support of compulsory vaccination, the British causes in the Second Boer War and First World War and the reform of the Congo Free State. He was a fervent advocate of justice who personally investigated two closed cases, both resulting in the exoneration of the accused men and setting precedent which partially led to the establishment of the Court of Criminal Appeal in 1907. He was noted for his skill as an architect and was involved in several sports as a player and judge.

Doyle was raised a Catholic but was agnostic as a young adult, later becoming a spiritualist mystic as a result of family tragedies, and was a Freemason for two separate periods. He embraced supernatural phenomena, including psychics, telepathy, mentalism and spirit photography, and publicly supported the Cottingley Fairies, later confirmed to be a hoax, which led to a public falling-out with his friend, the American magician Harry Houdini. Doyle's works are still widely read and adapted in the 21st century, with Sherlock Holmes being recognised as the single most portrayed literary character in film and television history, and a number of fictional works have depicted or been inspired by his life.

== Early life ==
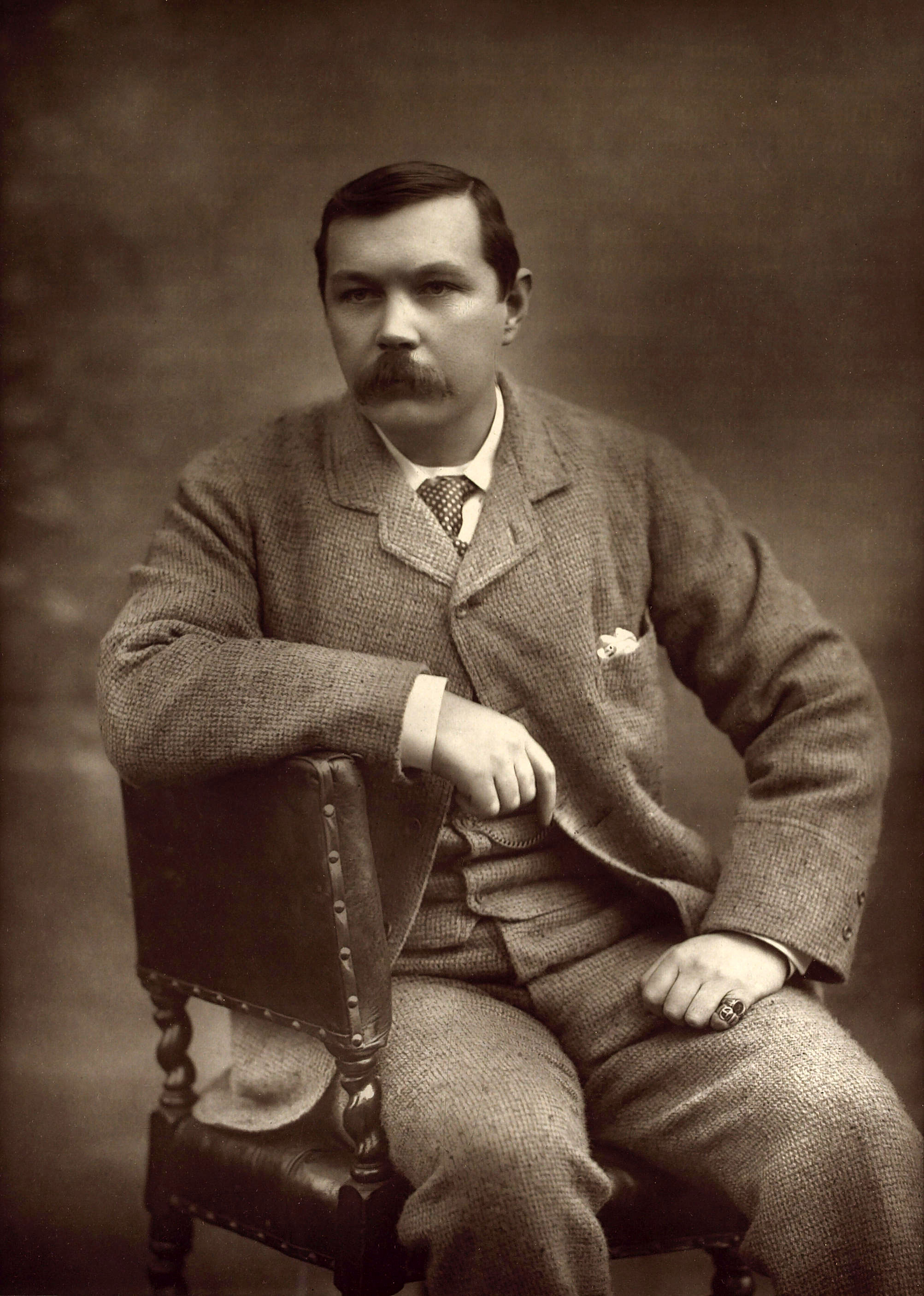
Portrait of Doyle by Herbert Rose Barraud, 1893

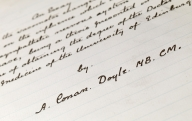
Title page from Arthur Conan Doyle's thesis

Doyle was born on 22 May 1859 at 11 Picardy Place, Edinburgh, Scotland. His father, Charles Altamont Doyle, was born in England, of Irish Catholic descent, and his mother, Mary (née Foley), was Irish Catholic. His parents married in 1855. In 1864, the family scattered because of Charles's growing alcoholism. The children were temporarily housed across Edinburgh. Arthur lodged with Mary Burton, the aunt of a friend, at Liberton Bank House on Gilmerton Road, while studying at Newington Academy.

In 1867, the family came together again and lived in squalid tenement flats at 3 Sciennes Place. Doyle's father died in 1893, in the Crichton Royal, Dumfries, after many years of psychiatric illness. Beginning at an early age, throughout his life Doyle wrote letters to his mother. Many of them were preserved.

Supported by wealthy uncles, Doyle was sent to England, to the Jesuit preparatory school Hodder Place, Stonyhurst in Lancashire, at the age of nine (1868–70). He went on to Stonyhurst College, which he attended until 1875. While Doyle was not unhappy at Stonyhurst, he said he did not have any fond memories of it because the school was run on medieval principles: the only subjects covered were rudiments, rhetoric, Euclidean geometry, algebra, and the classics. Doyle commented later in his life that this academic system could be excused only "on the plea that any exercise, however stupid in itself, forms a sort of mental dumbbell by which one can improve one's mind". He found the school harsh, noting that, instead of compassion and warmth, it favoured the threat of corporal punishment and ritual humiliation.

From 1875 to 1876, he was educated at the Jesuit school Stella Matutina in Feldkirch, Austria. His family decided that he would spend a year there in order to perfect his German and broaden his academic horizons. He was raised Catholic but later rejected the faith and became an agnostic. One source attributed his drift away from religion to the time he spent in the less strict Austrian school. He also later became a spiritualist mystic.

=== Name ===
Doyle is often referred to as "Sir Arthur Conan Doyle" or "Conan Doyle", implying that "Conan" is part of a compound surname rather than a middle name. However, his baptism entry in the register of St Mary's Cathedral, Edinburgh, gives "Arthur Ignatius Conan" as his given names and "Doyle" as his surname. It also names Michael Conan as his godfather. The catalogues of the British Library and the Library of Congress treat "Doyle" alone as his surname.

Steven Doyle, publisher of The Baker Street Journal, wrote: "Conan was Arthur's middle name. Shortly after he graduated from high school he began using Conan as a sort of surname. But technically his last name is simply 'Doyle'." When knighted, he was gazetted as Doyle, not under the compound Conan Doyle.

== Medical career ==
From 1876 to 1881, Doyle studied medicine at the University of Edinburgh Medical School; during this period he spent time working in Aston (then a town in Warwickshire, now part of Birmingham), Sheffield and Ruyton-XI-Towns, Shropshire. Also during this period, he studied practical botany at the Royal Botanic Garden in Edinburgh. While studying, Doyle began writing short stories. His earliest extant fiction, "The Haunted Grange of Goresthorpe", was unsuccessfully submitted to Blackwood's Magazine. His first published piece, "The Mystery of Sasassa Valley", a story set in South Africa, was printed in Chambers's Edinburgh Journal on 6 September 1879. On 20 September 1879, he published his first academic article, "Gelsemium as a Poison", in the British Medical Journal, a study which The Daily Telegraph regarded as potentially useful in a 21st-century murder investigation.

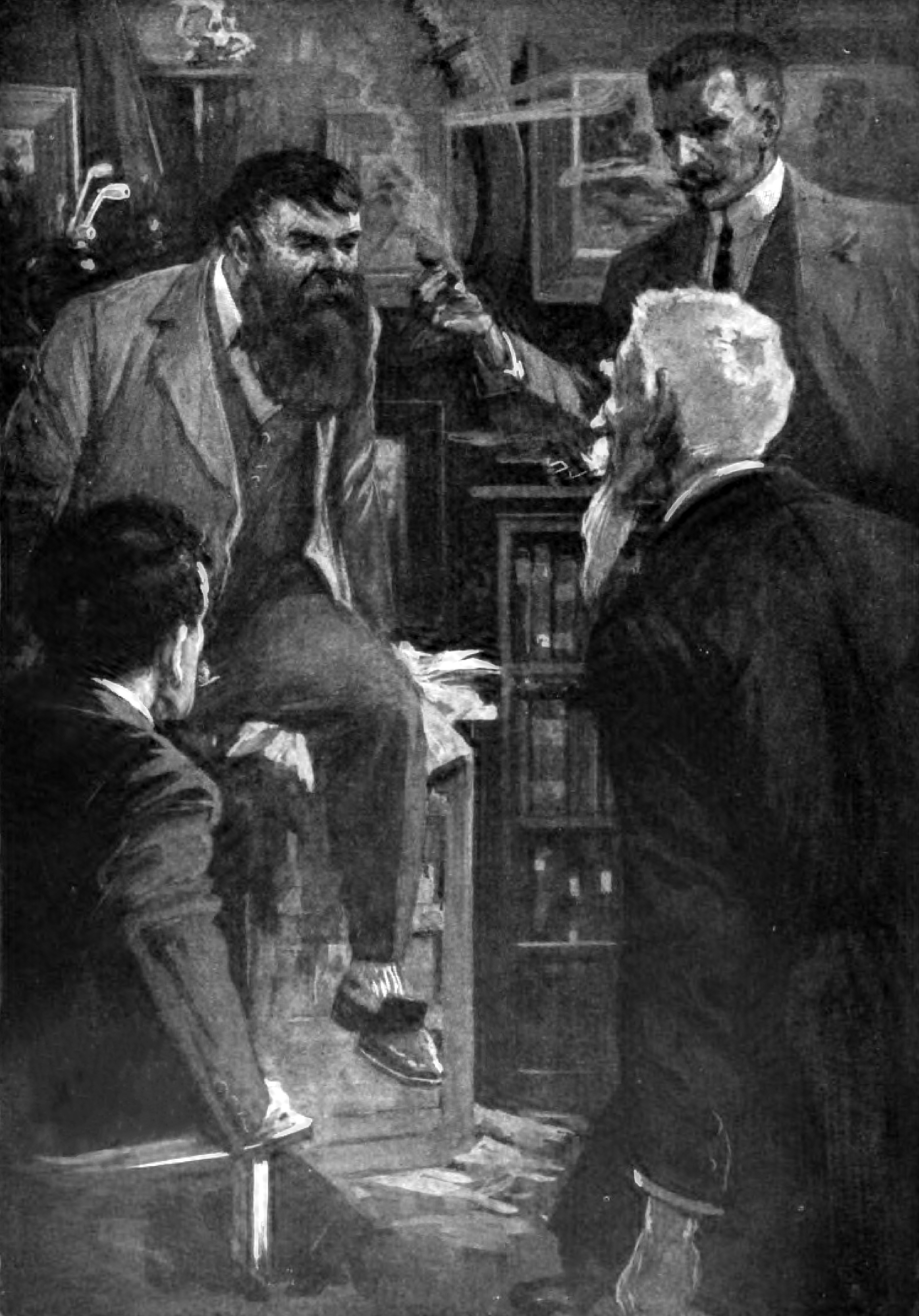
Professor Challenger by Harry Rountree in the novella The Poison Belt published in The Strand Magazine

Doyle was the doctor on the Greenland whaler Hope of Peterhead in 1880. On 11 July 1880, John Gray's Hope and David Gray's Eclipse met up with the Eira and Leigh Smith. The photographer W. J. A. Grant took a photograph aboard the Eira of Doyle along with Smith, the Gray brothers, and ship's surgeon William Neale, who were members of the Smith expedition. That expedition explored Franz Josef Land, and led to the naming, on 18 August, of Cape Flora, Bell Island, Nightingale Sound, Gratton ("Uncle Joe") Island, and Mabel Island.

After graduating with Bachelor of Medicine and Master of Surgery (M.B. C.M.) degrees from the University of Edinburgh in 1881, he was ship's surgeon on the SS Mayumba during a voyage to the West African coast. He completed his Doctor of Medicine (M.D.) degree (an advanced degree beyond the basic medical qualification in the UK) with a dissertation on tabes dorsalis in 1885.

In 1882, Doyle partnered with his former classmate George Turnavine Budd in a medical practice in Plymouth, but their relationship proved difficult, and Doyle soon left to set up an independent practice. Arriving in Portsmouth in June 1882, with less than £10 (£1400 in 2024) to his name, he set up a medical practice at 1 Bush Villas in Elm Grove, Southsea. The practice was not successful. While waiting for patients, Doyle returned to writing fiction.

Doyle was a staunch supporter of compulsory vaccination and wrote several articles advocating the practice and denouncing the views of anti-vaccinators.

In early 1891, Doyle embarked on the study of ophthalmology in Vienna. He had previously studied at the Portsmouth Eye Hospital in order to qualify to perform eye tests and prescribe glasses. Vienna had been suggested by his friend Vernon Morris as a place to spend six months and train to be an eye surgeon. But Doyle found it too difficult to understand the German medical terms being used in his classes in Vienna, and soon quit his studies there. For the rest of his two-month stay in Vienna, he pursued other activities, such as ice skating with his wife Louisa and drinking with Brinsley Richards of the London Times. He also wrote The Doings of Raffles Haw.

After visiting Venice and Milan, he spent a few days in Paris observing Edmund Landolt, an expert on diseases of the eye. Within three months of his departure for Vienna, Doyle returned to London. He opened a small office and consulting room at 2 Upper Wimpole Street, or 2 Devonshire Place as it was then. (There is today a Westminster City Council commemorative plaque over the front door.) He had no patients, according to his autobiography, and his efforts as an ophthalmologist were a failure.

== Literary career ==
=== Sherlock Holmes ===
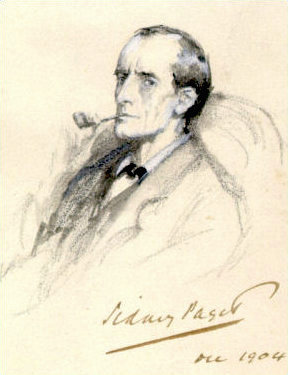
Portrait of Sherlock Holmes by Sidney Paget, 1904

Doyle initially struggled to find a publisher. His first work featuring Sherlock Holmes and Dr. Watson, A Study in Scarlet, was written in three weeks when he was 27 and was accepted for publication by Ward Lock & Co on 20 November 1886, which gave Doyle £25 (equivalent to £3,500 in 2024) in exchange for all rights to the story. The piece appeared a year later in the Beeton's Christmas Annual and received good reviews in The Scotsman and the Glasgow Herald.

Holmes was partially modelled on Doyle's former university teacher Joseph Bell. In 1892, in a letter to Bell, Doyle wrote, "It is most certainly to you that I owe Sherlock Holmes ... round the centre of deduction and inference and observation which I have heard you inculcate I have tried to build up a man", and in his 1924 autobiography, he remarked, "It is no wonder that after the study of such a character [viz., Bell] I used and amplified his methods when in later life I tried to build up a scientific detective who solved cases on his own merits and not through the folly of the criminal." Robert Louis Stevenson was able to recognise the strong similarity between Joseph Bell and Sherlock Holmes: "My compliments on your very ingenious and very interesting adventures of Sherlock Holmes. ... can this be my old friend Joe Bell?" Other authors sometimes suggest additional influences—for instance, Edgar Allan Poe's character C. Auguste Dupin, who is mentioned disparagingly by Holmes in A Study in Scarlet. Dr. (John) Watson owes his surname, but not any other obvious characteristic, to a Portsmouth medical colleague of Doyle's, Dr. James Watson.

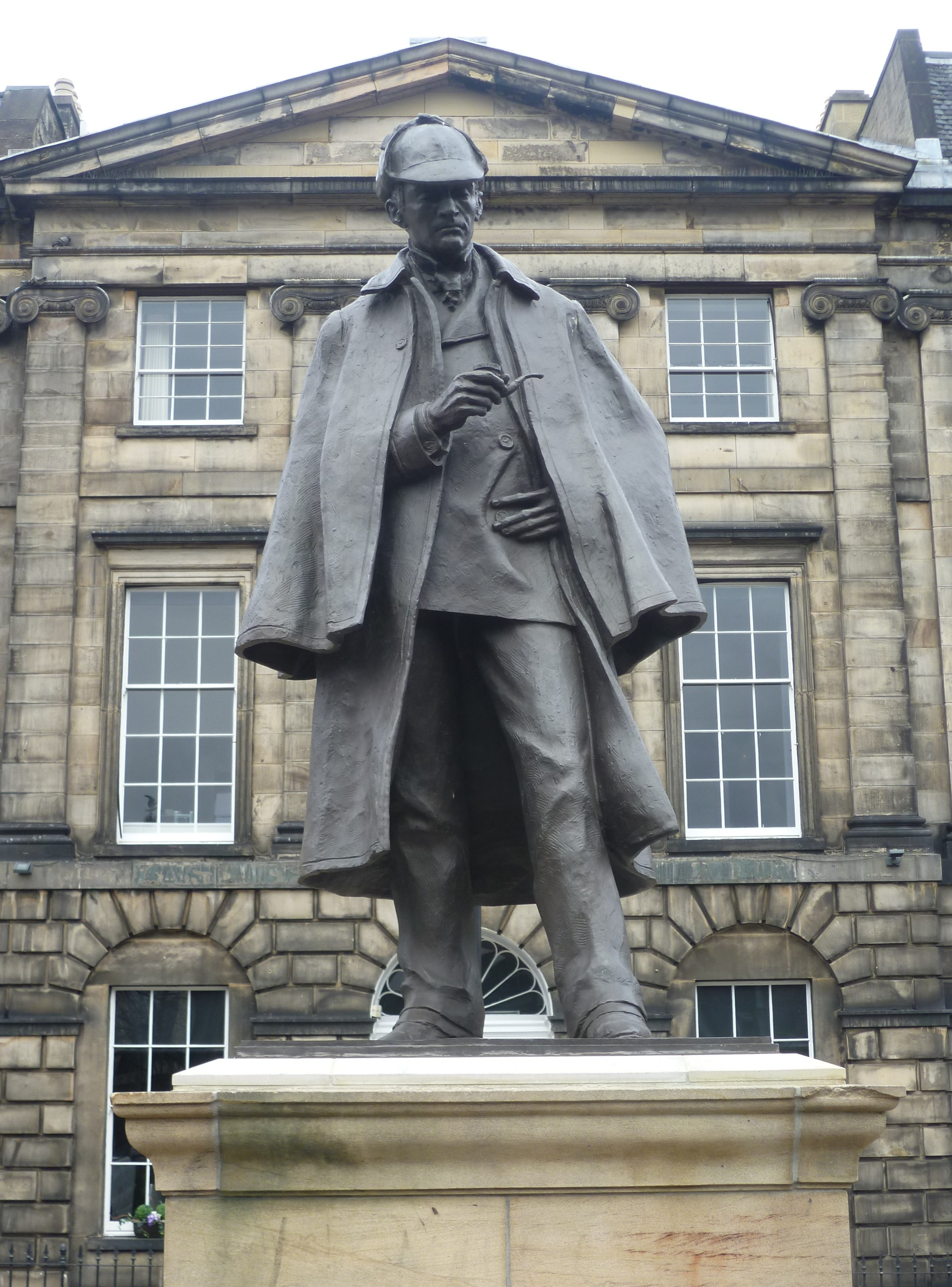
Sherlock Holmes statue in Edinburgh, erected opposite the birthplace of Doyle, which was demolished c. 1970

A sequel to A Study in Scarlet was commissioned, and The Sign of the Four appeared in Lippincott's Magazine in February 1890, under agreement with the Ward Lock company. Doyle felt grievously exploited by Ward Lock as an author new to the publishing world, and so, after this, he left them. Short stories featuring Sherlock Holmes were published in the Strand Magazine. Doyle wrote the first five Holmes short stories from his office at 2 Devonshire Place.

Doyle's attitude towards his most famous creation was ambivalent. In November 1891, he wrote to his mother: "I think of slaying Holmes, ... and winding him up for good and all. He takes my mind from better things." His mother responded, "You won't! You can't! You mustn't!" In an attempt to deflect publishers' demands for more Holmes stories, he raised his price to a level intended to discourage them, but found they were willing to pay even the large sums he asked. As a result, he became one of the best-paid authors of his time.

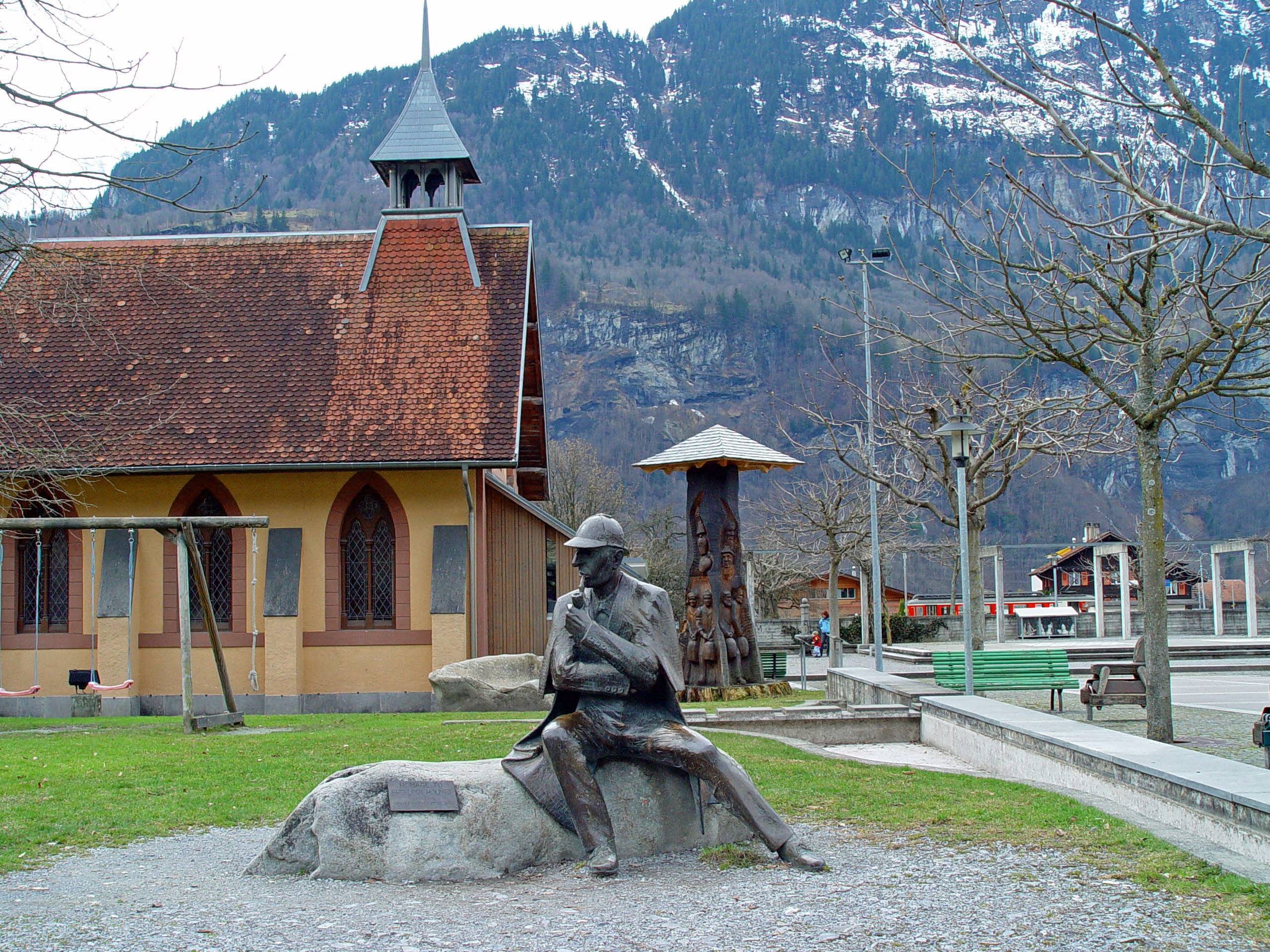
Statue of Holmes and the English Church in Meiringen

In December 1893, to dedicate more of his time to his historical novels, Doyle had Holmes and Professor Moriarty plunge to their deaths together down the Reichenbach Falls in the story "The Final Problem". Public outcry, however, led him to feature Holmes in 1901 in the novel The Hound of the Baskervilles. Holmes's fictional connection with the Reichenbach Falls is celebrated in the nearby town of Meiringen.

In 1903, Doyle published his first Holmes short story in ten years, "The Adventure of the Empty House", in which it was explained that only Moriarty had fallen, but since Holmes had other dangerous enemies—especially Colonel Sebastian Moran—he had arranged to make it look as if he too were dead. Holmes was ultimately featured in a total of 56 short stories—the last published in 1927—and four novels by Doyle, and has since appeared in many novels and stories by other authors.

=== Other works ===
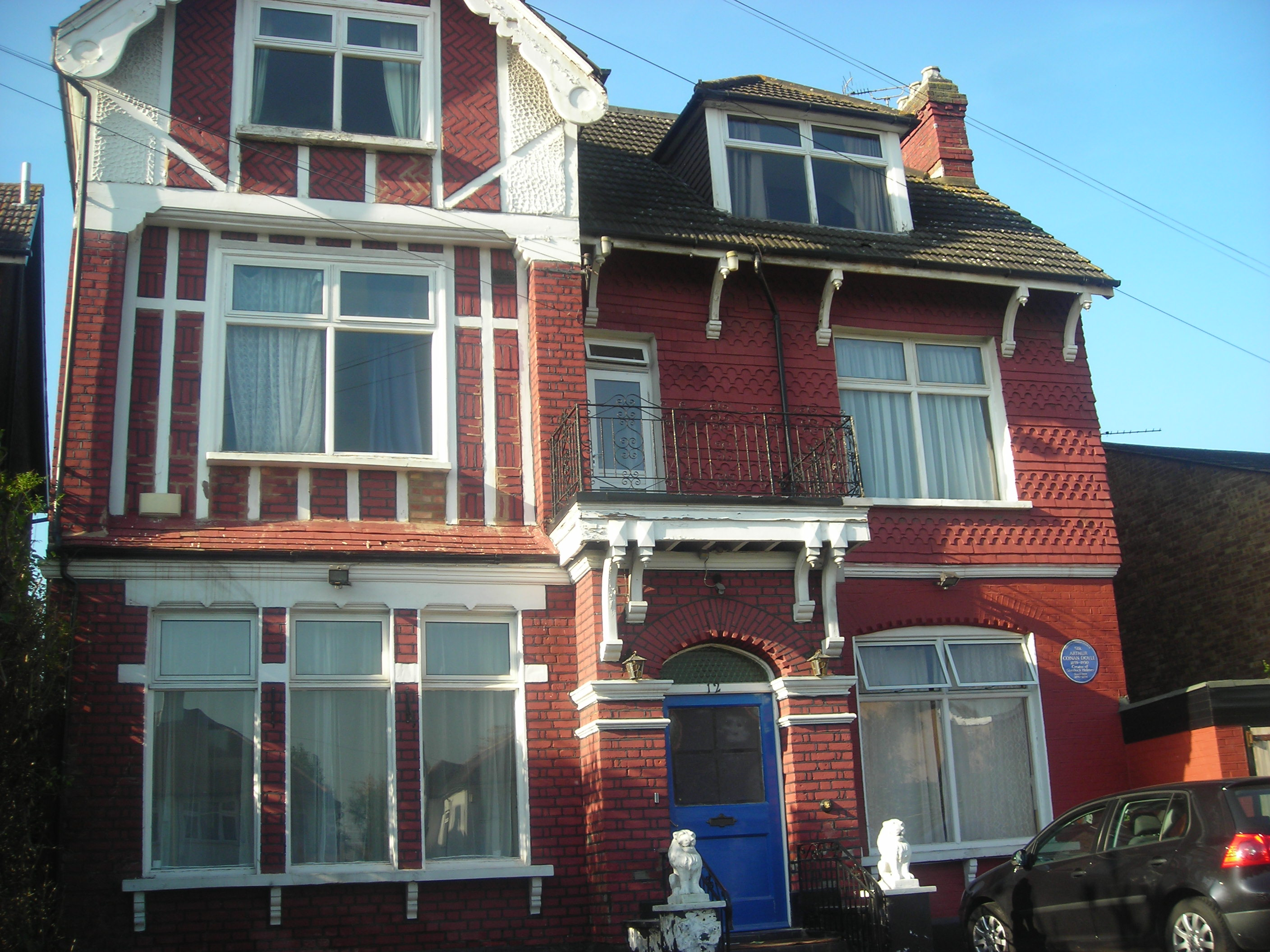
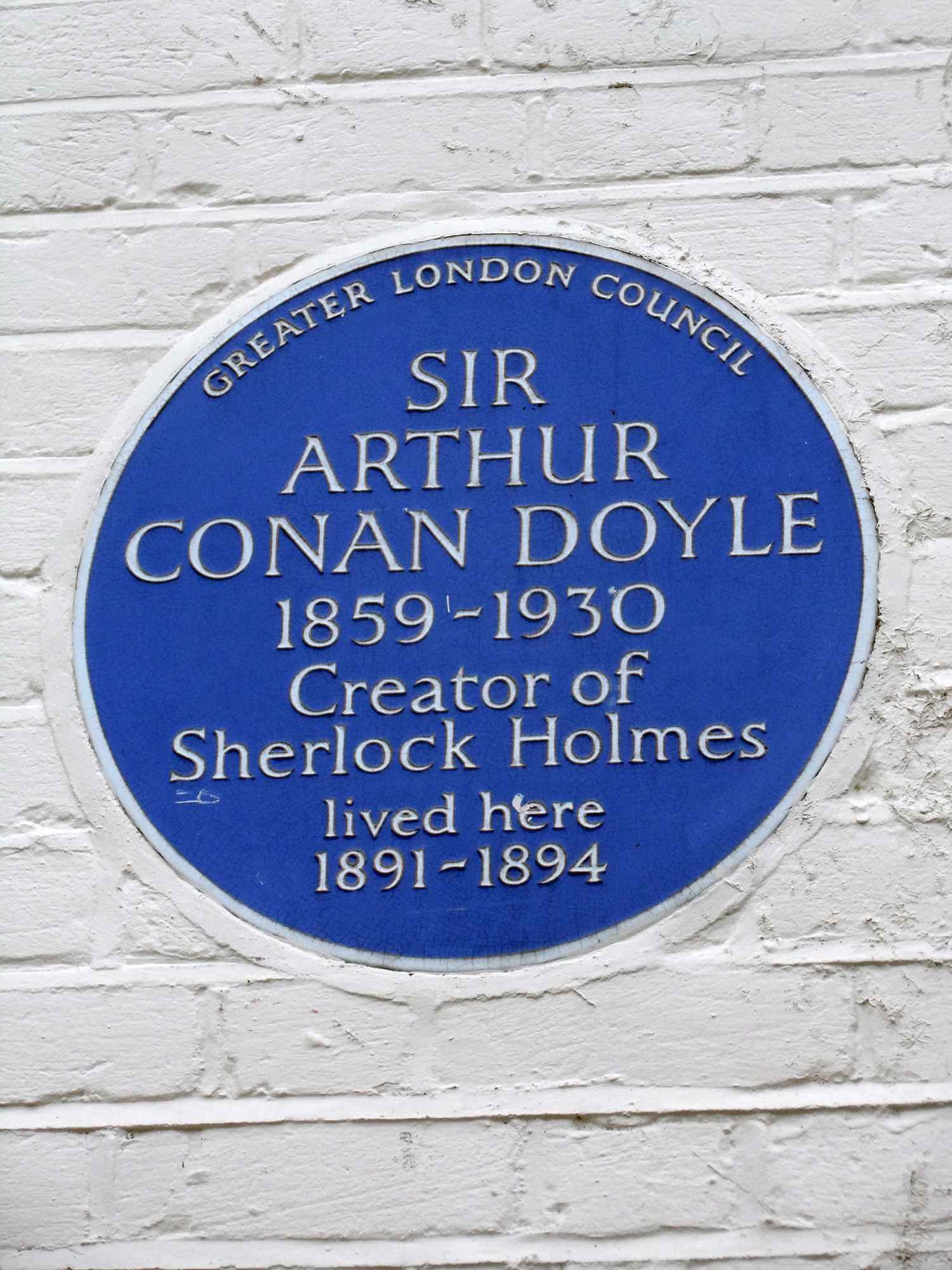
Doyle's house in South Norwood, Croydon, south-east London, and right, a close-up of the commemorative blue plaque at the address

Doyle's first novels were The Mystery of Cloomber, not published until 1888, and the unfinished Narrative of John Smith, published only posthumously, in 2011. He amassed a portfolio of short stories, including "The Captain of the Pole-Star" and "J. Habakuk Jephson's Statement", both inspired by Doyle's time at sea. The latter popularised the mystery of the Mary Celeste and added fictional details such as that the ship was found in perfect condition (it had actually taken on water by the time it was discovered), and that its boats remained on board (the single boat was in fact missing). These fictional details have come to dominate popular accounts of the incident, and Doyle's alternative spelling of the ship's name as the Marie Celeste has become more commonly used than the original spelling.

Between 1888 and 1906, Doyle wrote seven historical novels, which he and many critics regarded as his best work. He also wrote nine other novels, and—later in his career (1912–29)—five narratives (three of novel or novella length) featuring the irascible scientist Professor Challenger. The Challenger stories include his best-known work after the Holmes oeuvre, The Lost World. His historical novels include The White Company and its prequel Sir Nigel, set in the Middle Ages. He was a prolific author of short stories, including two collections set in Napoleonic times and featuring the French character Brigadier Gerard.

Doyle's works for the stage include Waterloo, which centres on the reminiscences of an English veteran of the Napoleonic Wars and features a character Gregory Brewster, written for Henry Irving; The House of Temperley, the plot of which reflects his abiding interest in boxing; The Speckled Band, adapted from his earlier short story "The Adventure of the Speckled Band"; and an 1893 collaboration with J. M. Barrie on the libretto of Jane Annie.

== Sporting career ==
While living in Southsea, the seaside resort near Portsmouth, Doyle played football as a goalkeeper for Portsmouth Association Football Club, an amateur side, under the pseudonym A. C. Smith.

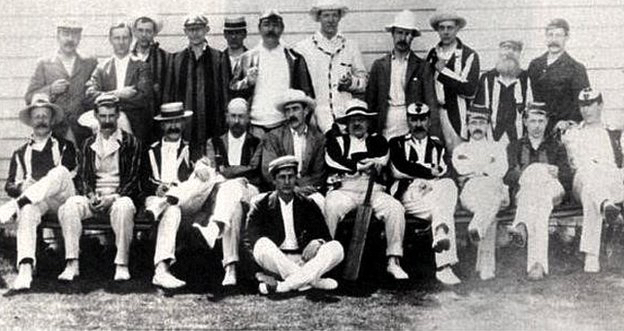
Authors v Artists cricket match in London, May 1903. Doyle is stood in the back row, 6th from left.

Doyle was a keen cricketer, and between 1899 and 1907 he played 10 first-class matches for the Marylebone Cricket Club (MCC). He also played for the amateur cricket teams the Allahakbarries and the Authors XI, which consisted of some of the best-known British authors from the era, including Doyle, J. M. Barrie, P. G. Wodehouse and A. A. Milne. His highest score, in 1902 against London County, was 43. He was an occasional bowler who took one first-class wicket, W. G. Grace, and wrote a poem about the achievement. His captaincy of the Authors XI lasted from 1899 to 1912, during which time his cricket scores were by far the most common entries in his diary.

In 1900, Doyle founded the Undershaw Rifle Club at his home, constructing a 100-yard range and providing shooting for local men, as the poor showing of British troops in the Boer War had led him to believe that the general population needed training in marksmanship. He was a champion of "miniature" rifle clubs, whose members shot small-calibre firearms on local ranges. These ranges were much cheaper and more accessible to working-class participants than large "fullbore" ranges, such as Bisley Camp, which were necessarily remote from population centres. Doyle went on to sit on the Rifle Clubs Committee of the National Rifle Association.

In 1901, Doyle was one of three judges for the world's first major bodybuilding competition, which was organised by the "Father of Bodybuilding", Eugen Sandow. The event was held in London's Royal Albert Hall. The other two judges were the sculptor Sir Charles Lawes-Wittewronge and Eugen Sandow himself.

Doyle was an amateur boxer. In 1909, he was invited to referee the James Jeffries–Jack Johnson heavyweight championship fight in Reno, Nevada. Doyle wrote: "I was much inclined to accept ... though my friends pictured me as winding up with a revolver at one ear and a razor at the other. However, the distance and my engagements presented a final bar."

Also a keen golfer, Doyle was elected captain of the Crowborough Beacon Golf Club in Sussex for 1910. He had moved to Little Windlesham house in Crowborough with Jean Leckie, his second wife, and resided there with his family from 1907 until his death in July 1930.

Doyle entered the English Amateur Billiards Championship in 1913. While living in Switzerland, Doyle became interested in skiing, which was relatively unknown in Switzerland at the time. He wrote an article, "An Alpine Pass on 'Ski'" for the December 1894 issue of The Strand Magazine, in which he described his experiences with skiing and the beautiful alpine scenery that could be seen in the process. The article popularised the activity and began the long association between Switzerland and skiing.

== Personal life ==
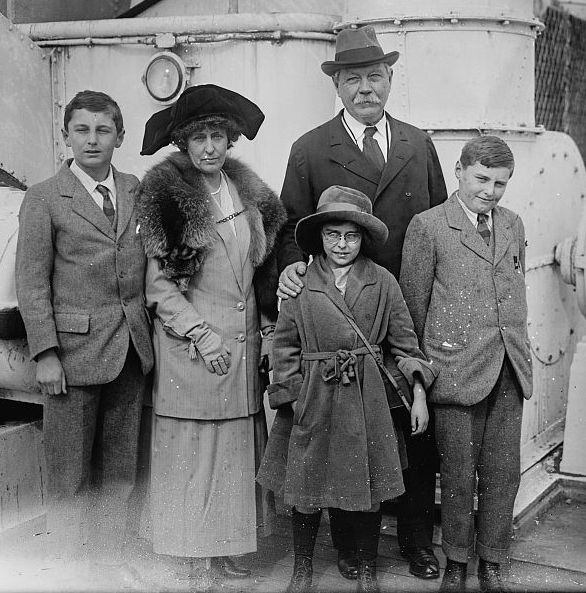
Doyle with his family c. 1923–1925

In 1885, Doyle married Louisa (sometimes called "Touie") Hawkins (1857–1906). She was the youngest daughter of J. Hawkins, of Minsterworth, Gloucestershire, and the sister of one of Doyle's patients. Louisa had tuberculosis. In 1907, the year after Louisa's death, he married Jean Elizabeth Leckie (1874–1940). He had met and fallen in love with Jean in 1897, but had maintained a platonic relationship with her while his first wife was still alive, out of loyalty to her. Most of Doyle's family, including his mother, were aware of the relationship, but it appears to have remained unknown to Louisa. Jean outlived her husband and died during wartime on 27 June 1940.

Doyle fathered five children. He had two with his first wife: Mary Louise (1889–1976) and Arthur Alleyne Kingsley, known as Kingsley (1892–1918). He had an additional three with his second wife: Denis Percy Stewart (1909–1955), who became the second husband of the Georgian noblewoman Nina Mdivani; Adrian Malcolm (1910–1970); and Jean Lena Annette (1912–1997). None of Doyle's five children had children of their own, so he has no living direct descendants.

== Political campaigning ==
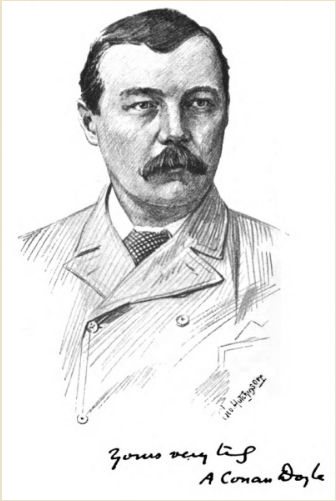
Arthur Conan Doyle by George Wylie Hutchinson, 1894

Doyle served as a volunteer physician in the Langman Field Hospital at Bloemfontein between March and June 1900, during the Second Boer War in South Africa (1899–1902). Later that year, he wrote a book on the war, The Great Boer War, as well as a short work titled The War in South Africa: Its Cause and Conduct, in which he responded to critics of the United Kingdom's role in that war, and argued that its role was justified. The latter work was widely translated, and Doyle believed it was the reason he was knighted (given the rank of Knight Bachelor) by King Edward VII in the 1902 Coronation Honours. He received the accolade from the King in person at Buckingham Palace on 24 October of that year.

He stood for Parliament twice as a Liberal Unionist: in 1900 in Edinburgh Central, and in 1906 in the Hawick Burghs, but was not elected. He served as a Deputy-Lieutenant of Surrey beginning in 1902, and was appointed a Knight of Grace of the Order of the Hospital of Saint John of Jerusalem in 1903.

Doyle was a supporter of the campaign for the reform of the Congo Free State that was led by the journalist E. D. Morel and diplomat Roger Casement. In 1909, he wrote The Crime of the Congo, a long pamphlet in which he denounced the horrors of that colony. He became acquainted with Morel and Casement, and it is possible that, together with Bertram Fletcher Robinson, they inspired several characters that appear in his 1912 novel The Lost World. Later, after the Irish Easter Rising, Casement was found guilty of treason against the Crown, and was sentenced to death. Doyle tried, unsuccessfully, to save him, arguing that Casement had been driven mad and therefore should not be held responsible for his actions.

As the First World War loomed, and having been caught up in a growing public swell of Germanophobia, Doyle gave a public donation of 10 shillings to the anti-immigration British Brothers' League. In 1914, Doyle was one of fifty-three leading British authors—including H. G. Wells, Rudyard Kipling and Thomas Hardy—who signed their names to the "Authors' Declaration", justifying Britain's involvement in the First World War. This manifesto declared that the German invasion of Belgium had been a brutal crime, and that Britain "could not without dishonour have refused to take part in the present war".

== Legal advocate ==
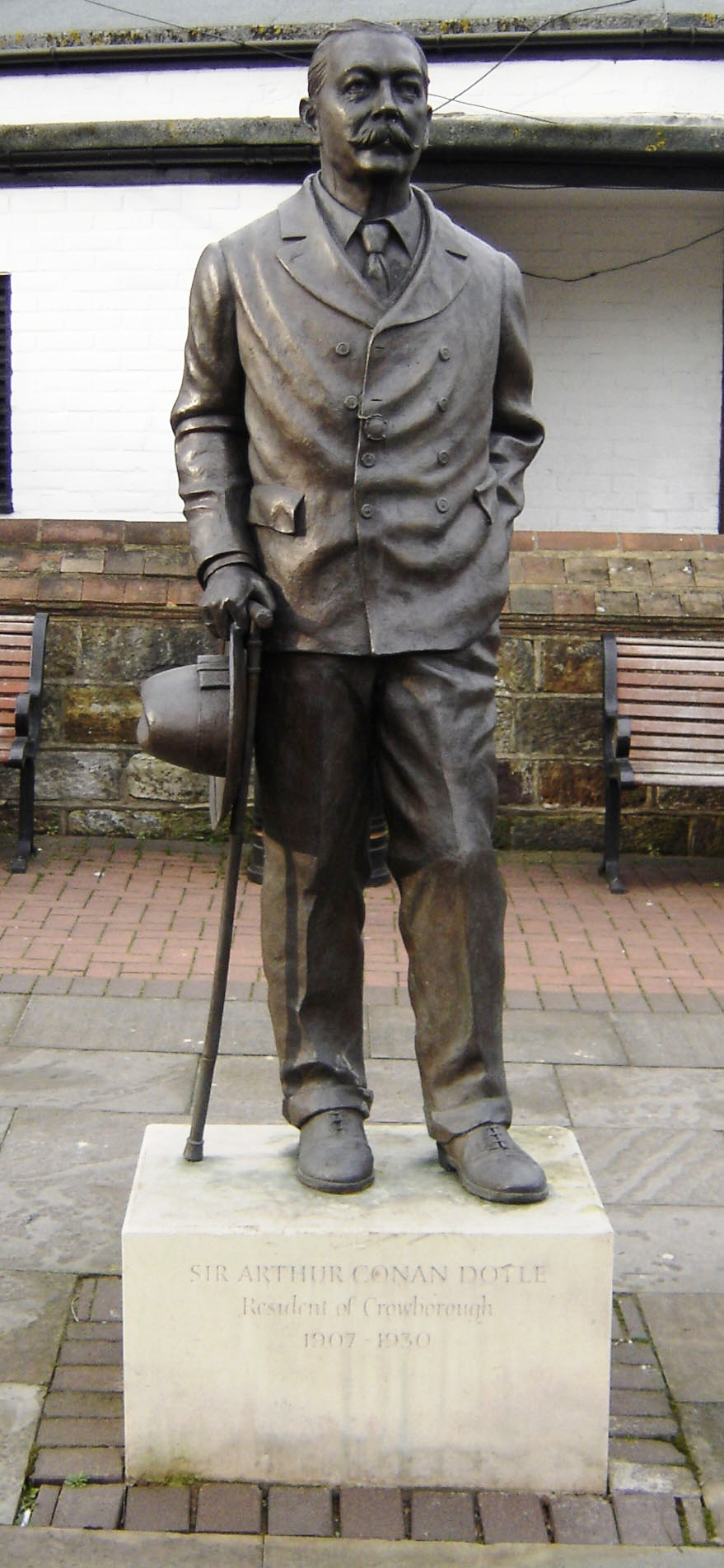
Doyle statue in Crowborough, East Sussex

Doyle was also a fervent advocate of justice and personally investigated two closed cases, which led to two men being exonerated of the crimes of which they were accused. The first case, in 1906, involved a shy half-British, half-Indian lawyer named George Edalji, who had allegedly penned threatening letters and mutilated animals in Great Wyrley. Police were set on Edalji's conviction, even though the mutilations continued after their suspect was jailed. Apart from helping George Edalji, Doyle's work helped establish a way to correct other miscarriages of justice, as it was partially as a result of this case that the Court of Criminal Appeal was established in 1907.

The story of Doyle and Edalji was dramatised in an episode of the 1972 BBC television series, The Edwardians. In Nicholas Meyer's pastiche The West End Horror (1976), Holmes manages to help clear the name of a shy Parsi Indian character wronged by the English justice system. Edalji was of Parsi heritage on his father's side. The story was fictionalised in Julian Barnes's 2005 novel Arthur and George, which was adapted into a three-part drama by ITV in 2015.

The second case, that of Oscar Slater—a Jew of German origin who operated a gambling den and was convicted of bludgeoning an 82-year-old woman in Glasgow in 1908—excited Doyle's curiosity because of inconsistencies in the prosecution's case and a general sense that Slater was not guilty. He ended up paying most of the costs for Slater's successful 1928 appeal.. Doyle's documents relating to his campaign and the case itself are held in the Mitchell Library as part of Glasgow City Archives' collections.

== Freemasonry and spiritualism ==
Doyle had a longstanding interest in mystical subjects and remained fascinated by the idea of paranormal phenomena, even though the strength of his belief in their reality waxed and waned periodically over the years.

In 1887, in Southsea, influenced by Major-General Alfred Wilks Drayson, a member of the Portsmouth Literary and Philosophical Society, Doyle began a series of investigations into the possibility of psychic phenomena and attended about 20 seances, experiments in telepathy, and sittings with mediums. Writing to spiritualist journal Light that year, he declared himself to be a spiritualist, describing one particular event that had convinced him psychic phenomena were real. Also in 1887 (on 26 January), he was initiated as a Freemason at the Phoenix Lodge No. 257 in Southsea. (He resigned from the Lodge in 1889, returned to it in 1902, and resigned again in 1911.)

In 1889, he became a founding member of the Hampshire Society for Psychical Research; in 1893, he joined the London-based Society for Psychical Research; and in 1894, he collaborated with Sir Sidney Scott and Frank Podmore in a search for poltergeists in Devon. Some claim that Doyle was also a member of the Hermetic Order of the Golden Dawn; others, such as the biographer Christopher Sandford, dispute this, saying that while he knew members of the order and was invited to join, he most likely declined, being already too busy with other organisations and pursuits.

Doyle and the spiritualist William Thomas Stead (who would die on the Titanic) were led to believe that Julius and Agnes Zancig had genuine psychic powers, and they claimed publicly that the Zancigs used telepathy. However, in 1924, the Zancigs confessed that their mind reading act had been a trick; they published the secret code and all other details of the trick method they had used under the title "Our Secrets!!" in a London newspaper. Doyle also praised the psychic phenomena and spirit materialisations that he believed had been produced by Eusapia Palladino and Mina Crandon, both of whom were also later exposed as frauds.

In 1916, at the height of the First World War, Doyle's belief in psychic phenomena was strengthened by what he took to be the psychic abilities of his children's nanny, Lily Loder Symonds. This and the constant drumbeat of wartime deaths inspired him with the idea that spiritualism was what he called a "New Revelation" sent by God to bring solace to the bereaved. He wrote a piece in Light magazine about his faith and began lecturing frequently on spiritualism. In 1918, he published his first spiritualist work, The New Revelation.

Some have mistakenly assumed that Doyle's turn to spiritualism was prompted by the death of his son Kingsley, but Doyle began presenting himself publicly as a spiritualist in 1916, and Kingsley died on 28 October 1918 (from pneumonia contracted during his convalescence after being seriously wounded in the 1916 Battle of the Somme). Nevertheless, the war-related deaths of many people who were close to him appear to have even further strengthened his long-held belief in life after death and spirit communication. Doyle's brother Brigadier-general Innes Doyle died, also from pneumonia, in February 1919. His two brothers-in-law (one of whom was E. W. Hornung, creator of the literary character Raffles), as well as his two nephews, also died shortly after the war. His second book on spiritualism, The Vital Message, appeared in 1919.

Doyle found solace in supporting spiritualism's ideas and the attempts of spiritualists to find proof of an existence beyond the grave. In particular, according to some, he favoured Christian Spiritualism and encouraged the Spiritualists' National Union to accept an eighth precept—that of following the teachings and example of Jesus of Nazareth. He was a member of the supernaturalist organisation The Ghost Club.

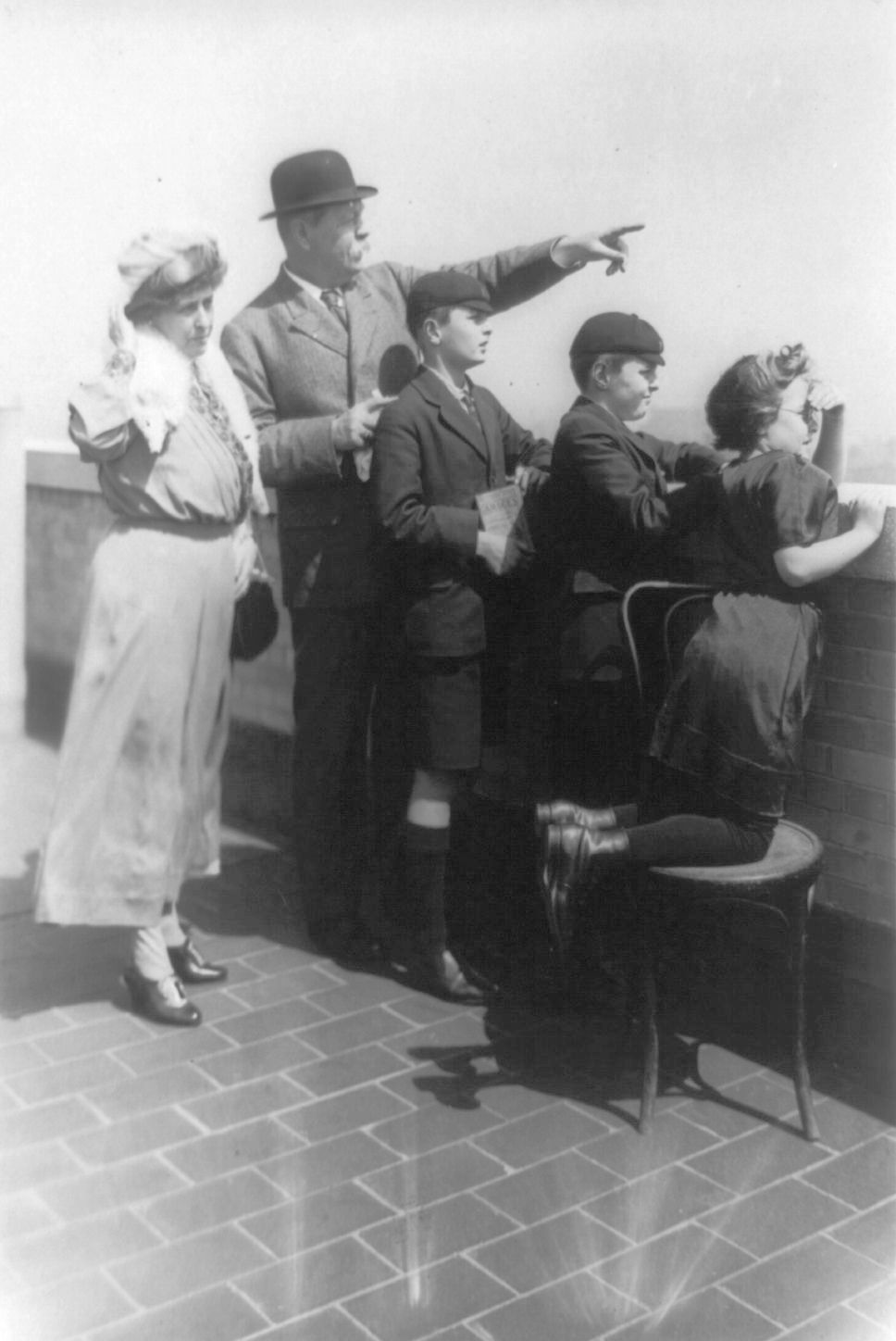
Doyle with his family in New York City, 1922

In 1919, the magician P. T. Selbit staged a séance at his flat in Bloomsbury, which Doyle attended. Although some later claimed that Doyle had endorsed the apparent instances of clairvoyance at that séance as genuine, a contemporaneous report by the Sunday Express quoted Doyle as saying "I should have to see it again before passing a definite opinion on it" and "I have my doubts about the whole thing". In 1920, Doyle and the noted sceptic Joseph McCabe held a public debate at Queen's Hall in London, with Doyle taking the position that the claims of spiritualism were true. After the debate, McCabe published a booklet Is Spiritualism Based on Fraud?, in which he laid out evidence refuting Doyle's arguments and claimed that Doyle had been duped into believing in spiritualism through deliberate mediumship trickery.

Doyle also debated the psychiatrist Harold Dearden, who vehemently disagreed with Doyle's belief that many cases of diagnosed mental illness were the result of spirit possession.

In 1920, Doyle travelled to Australia and New Zealand on spiritualist missionary work, and over the next several years, until his death, he continued his mission, giving talks about his spiritualist conviction in Britain, Europe, and the United States.

One of the five photographs of Frances Griffiths with the alleged fairies, taken by Elsie Wright in Cottingley, England in July 1917

Doyle wrote a novel The Land of Mist centred on spiritualist themes and featuring the character Professor Challenger. He also wrote many non-fiction spiritualist works. Perhaps his most famous of these was The Coming of the Fairies (1922), in which Doyle described his beliefs about the nature and existence of fairies and spirits, reproduced the five Cottingley Fairies photographs, asserted that those who suspected them being faked were wrong, and expressed his conviction that they were authentic. Decades later, the photos—taken by cousins Frances Griffiths and Elsie Wright—were definitively shown to have been faked, and their creators admitted to the fakery, although both maintained that they really had seen fairies.

Doyle was friends for a time with the American magician Harry Houdini. Even though Houdini explained that his feats were based on illusion and trickery, Doyle was convinced that Houdini had supernatural powers and said as much in his work The Edge of the Unknown. Houdini's friend Bernard M. L. Ernst recounted a time when Houdini had performed an impressive trick at his home in Doyle's presence. Houdini had assured Doyle that the trick was pure illusion and had expressed the hope that this demonstration would persuade Doyle not to go around "endorsing phenomena" simply because he could think of no explanation for what he had seen other than supernatural power. However, according to Ernst, Doyle simply refused to believe that it had been a trick. Houdini became a prominent opponent of the spiritualist movement in the 1920s, after the death of his beloved mother. He insisted that spiritualist mediums employed trickery, and he consistently exposed them as frauds. These differences between Houdini and Doyle eventually led to a bitter, public falling-out between them.

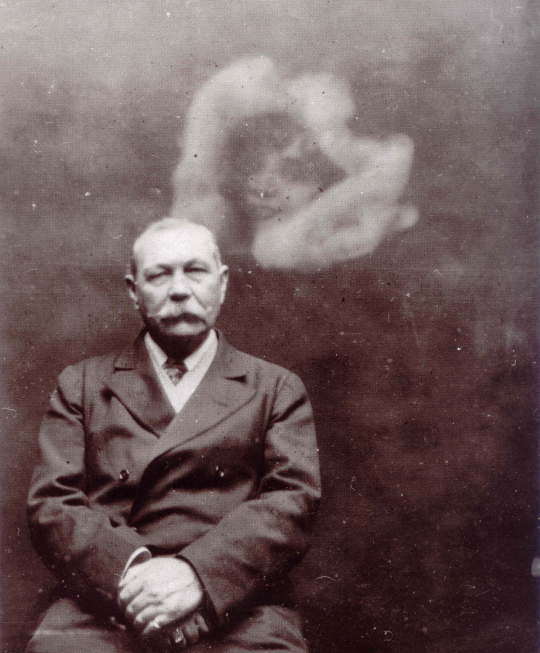
1922 photograph of Doyle by spirit photographer Ada Deane

In 1922, the psychical researcher Harry Price accused the "spirit photographer" William Hope of fraud. Doyle defended Hope, but further evidence of trickery was obtained from other researchers. Doyle threatened to have Price evicted from the National Laboratory of Psychical Research and predicted that, if he persisted in writing what he called "sewage" about spiritualists, he would meet the same fate as Harry Houdini. Price wrote: "Arthur Conan Doyle and his friends abused me for years for exposing Hope." In response to the exposure of frauds that had been perpetrated by Hope and other spiritualists, Doyle led 84 members of the Society for Psychical Research to resign in protest from the society on the ground that they believed it was opposed to spiritualism.

In 1923, Doyle visited T. G. Hamilton, a doctor and psychic researcher in Winnipeg, Manitoba, Canada, and attended a meeting at his home, at which a medium demonstrated various psychic abilities.

Doyle's two-volume book The History of Spiritualism was published in 1926. W. Leslie Curnow a spiritualist, contributed much research to the book. Later that year, Robert John Tillyard wrote a predominantly supportive review of it in the journal Nature. This review provoked controversy: Several other critics, including A. A. Campbell Swinton, pointed out the evidence of fraud in mediumship, as well as Doyle's non-scientific approach to the subject. In 1927, Doyle gave a filmed interview, in which he spoke about Sherlock Holmes and spiritualism.

== Doyle and the Piltdown hoax ==
Richard Milner, an American historian of science, argued that Doyle may have been the perpetrator of the Piltdown Man hoax of 1912, creating the counterfeit hominid fossil that fooled the scientific world for over 40 years. Milner noted that Doyle had a plausible motive—namely, revenge on the scientific establishment for debunking one of his favourite psychics—and said that The Lost World appeared to contain several clues referring cryptically to his having been involved in the hoax. Samuel Rosenberg's 1974 book Naked Is the Best Disguise purports to explain how, throughout his writings, Doyle had provided overt clues to otherwise hidden or suppressed aspects of his way of thinking that seemed to support the idea that Doyle would be involved in such a hoax.

However, more recent research suggests that Doyle was not involved. In 2016, researchers at the Natural History Museum and Liverpool John Moores University analyzed DNA evidence showing that responsibility for the hoax lay with the amateur archaeologist Charles Dawson, who had originally "found" the remains. He had initially not been considered the likely perpetrator, because the hoax was seen as being too elaborate for him to have devised. However, the DNA evidence showed that a supposedly ancient tooth he had "discovered" in 1915 (at a different site) came from the same jaw as that of the Piltdown Man, suggesting that he had planted them both. That tooth, too, was later proven to have been planted as part of a hoax.

Chris Stringer, an anthropologist from the Natural History Museum, was quoted as saying: "Conan Doyle was known to play golf at the Piltdown site and had even given Dawson a lift in his car to the area, but he was a public man and very busy[,] and it is very unlikely that he would have had the time [to create the hoax]. So there are some coincidences, but I think they are just coincidences. When you look at the fossil evidence[,] you can only associate Dawson with all the finds, and Dawson was known to be personally ambitious. He wanted professional recognition. He wanted to be a member of the Royal Society and he was after an MBE [sic]. He wanted people to stop seeing him as an amateur".

== Architecture ==
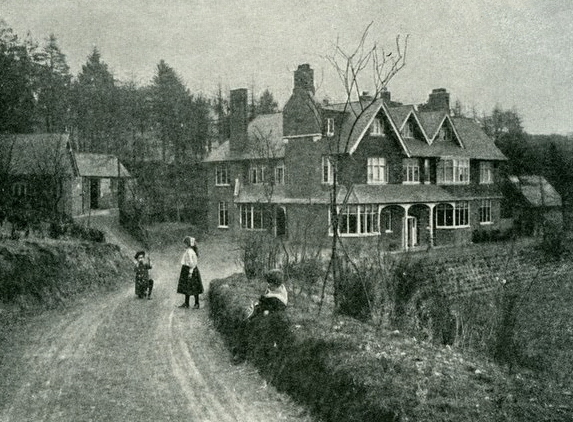
Façade of Undershaw with Doyle's children, Mary and Kingsley, on the drive

Another of Doyle's longstanding interests was architectural design. In 1895, when he commissioned an architect friend of his, Joseph Henry Ball, to build him a home, he played an active part in the design process. The home in which he lived from October 1897 to September 1907, known as Undershaw (near Hindhead, in Surrey), was used as a hotel and restaurant from 1924 until 2004, when it was bought by a developer and then stood empty while conservationists and Doyle fans fought to preserve it. In 2012, the High Court in London ruled in favour of those seeking to preserve the historic building, ordering that the redevelopment permission be quashed on the ground that it had not been obtained through proper procedures. The building was later approved to become part of Stepping Stones, a school for children with disabilities and special needs.

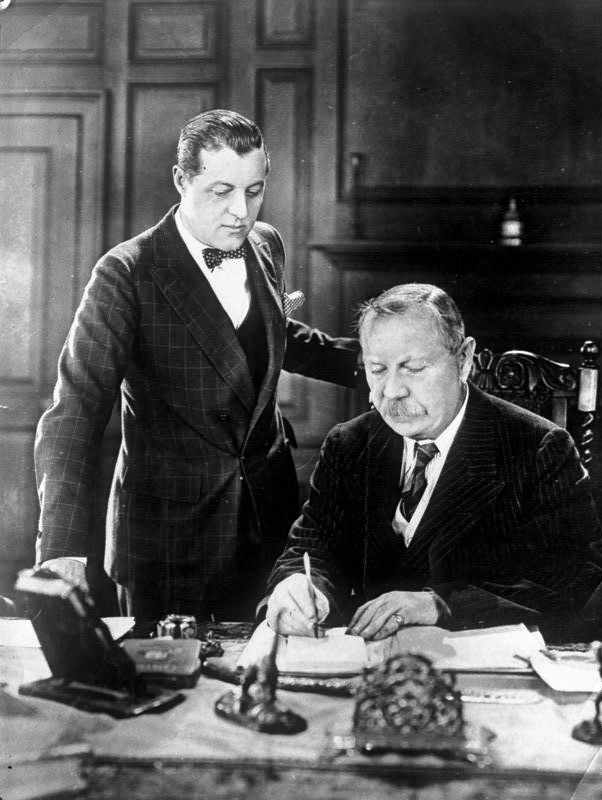
Doyle in 1930 with his son Adrian

Doyle made his most ambitious foray into architecture in March 1912, while he was staying at the Lyndhurst Grand Hotel: he sketched the original designs for a third-storey extension and for an alteration of the front facade of the building. Work began later that year, and when it was finished, the building was a nearly exact manifestation of the plans Doyle had sketched. Superficial alterations have been subsequently made, but the essential structure is still clearly Doyle's.

In 1914, on a family trip to the Jasper National Park in Canada, he designed a golf course and ancillary buildings for a hotel. The plans were realised in full, but neither the golf course nor the buildings have survived.

In 1926, Doyle laid the foundation stone for a Spiritualist Temple in Camden, London. Of the building's total £600 construction costs, he provided £500.

== Crimes Club ==
The Crimes Club was a private social club founded by Doyle in 1903, whose purpose was discussion of crime and detection, criminals and criminology, and continues to this day as "Our Society", with membership numbers limited to 100. The club meets four times a year at the Imperial Hotel, Russell Square, London, with the proceedings conducted under the Chatham House Rules. Its logo is a silhouette of Doyle.

The club's earliest members included John Churton Collins, Japanologist Arthur Diósy, Sir Edward Marshall Hall, Sir Travers Humphreys, H. B. Irving, author (Thou Shalt Do No Murder) Arthur Lambton, William Le Queux, A. E. W. Mason, coroner Samuel Ingleby Oddie, Sir Max Pemberton, Bertram Fletcher Robinson, George R. Sims, Sir Bernard Spilsbury, Sir P. G. Wodehouse, and Filson Young.

== Death ==
Doyle was found clutching his chest in the hall of Windlesham Manor, his house in Crowborough, Sussex, on 7 July 1930. He died of a heart attack at the age of 71. His last words were directed toward his wife: "You are wonderful."

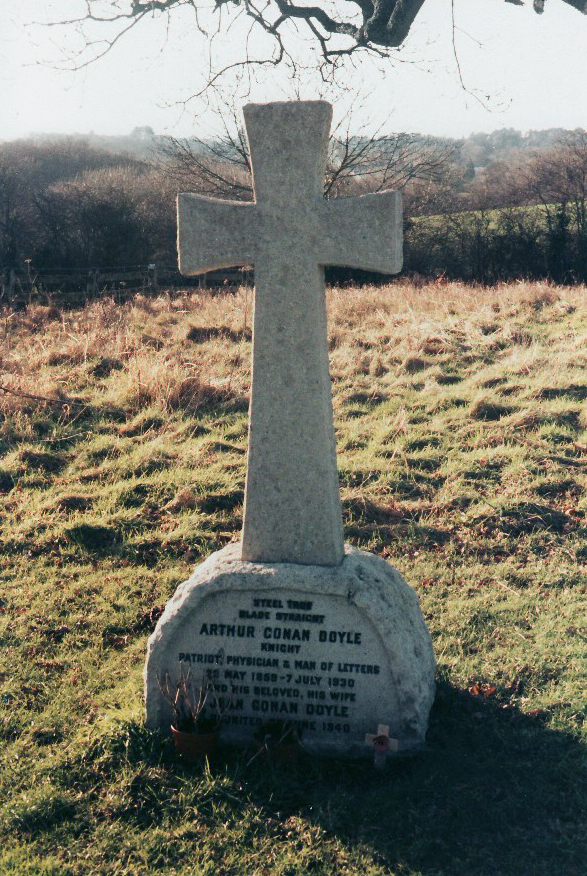
Doyle's grave at Minstead

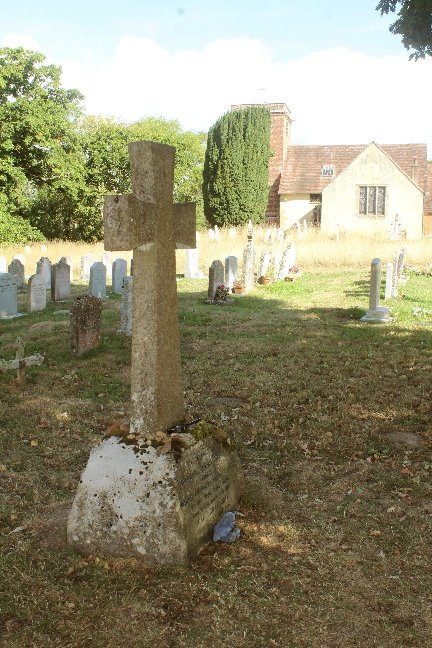
Doyle's Grave and Minstead church in 2025

At the time of his death, there was some controversy concerning his burial place, as he was avowedly not a Christian, considering himself a Spiritualist. He was first buried on 11 July 1930 in Windlesham rose garden. In his will, he bequeathed £250 per year to Alfred Wood, who had served as his private secretary since 1897.

He was later reinterred together with his wife in Minstead churchyard in the New Forest, Hampshire. The epitaph on his gravestone in the churchyard reads, in part: "Steel true / Blade straight / Arthur Conan Doyle / Knight / Patriot, physician and man of letters".

Carved wooden tablets to his memory and to the memory of his wife, originally from the church at Minstead, are on display as part of a Sherlock Holmes exhibition at Portsmouth Museum.

A statue honours Doyle at Crowborough Cross in Crowborough, where he lived for 23 years. There is a statue of Sherlock Holmes in Picardy Place, Edinburgh, close to the house where Doyle was born.

== Honours and awards ==
Knight Bachelor (1902)
Knight of Grace of the Most Venerable Order of the Hospital of Saint John of Jerusalem (1903)
Queen's South Africa Medal (1901)
Knight of the Order of the Crown of Italy (1895)
Order of the Medjidie – 2nd Class (Ottoman Empire) (1907)

=== Commemoration ===
Doyle has been commemorated with statues and plaques since his death. In 2009, he was among the ten people selected by the Royal Mail for their "Eminent Britons" commemorative postage stamp issue.

== Portrayals ==
Arthur Conan Doyle has been portrayed by many actors, including:

=== Television series ===
- Nigel Davenport in the BBC Two series The Edwardians, in the episode "Conan Doyle" (1972)
- Michael Ensign in the Voyagers! episode "Jack's Back" (1983)
- Robin Laing and Charles Edwards in Murder Rooms: Mysteries of the Real Sherlock Holmes (2000–2001)
- Geraint Wyn Davies in Murdoch Mysteries, 3 episodes (2008–2013)
- Alfred Molina in the Drunk History (American series) episode "Detroit" (2013)
- David Calder in the miniseries Houdini (2014)
- Martin Clunes in the miniseries Arthur & George (2015)
- Bruce Mackinnon and Bradley Walsh in Drunk History (British series), in series 2, episodes 5 and 8 respectively (2016)
- Stephen Mangan in Houdini & Doyle (2016)
- Michael Pitthan in the German TV series Charité episode "Götterdämmerung" (2017)
- Bill Paterson in the Urban Myths episode "Agatha Christie" (2018)

=== Television films ===
- Peter Cushing in The Great Houdini (1976)
- David Warner in Houdini (1998)
- Richard Wilson in Reichenbach Falls (2007)
- Michael McElhatton in Agatha and the Truth of Murder (2018)

=== Theatrical films ===
- Paul Bildt in The Man Who Was Sherlock Holmes (1937)
- Peter O'Toole in FairyTale: A True Story (1997)
- Edward Hardwicke in Photographing Fairies (1997)
- Tom Fisher in Shanghai Knights (2003)
- Ian Hart in Finding Neverland (2004)

=== Other media ===
- Carleton Hobbs in the BBC radio drama Conan Doyle Investigates (1972)
- Iain Cuthbertson in the BBC radio drama Conan Doyle and The Edalji Case (1987)
- Peter Jeffrey in the BBC radio drama Conan Doyle's Strangest Case (1995)
- Adrian Lukis in the stage adaptation of the novel Arthur & George (2010)
- Chris Tallman in Chapter 10 of The Dead Authors Podcast (2012)
- Steven Miller in the Jago & Litefoot audio drama "The Monstrous Menagerie" (2014)
- Eamon Stocks in the video game Assassin's Creed Syndicate (2015)
- Ryohei Kimura in the mobile game Ikémen Vampire: Temptation in the Dark (2019)

== In fiction ==
Arthur Conan Doyle is the ostensible narrator of Ian Madden's short story "Cracks in an Edifice of Sheer Reason".

Sir Arthur Conan Doyle features as a recurring character in Pip Murphy's Christie and Agatha's Detective Agency series, including A Discovery Disappears and Of Mountains and Motors.

== See also ==
- List of notable Freemasons
- Physician writer § 19th century
- William Gillette – A personal friend who performed the most famous stage version of Sherlock Holmes
