= The Vital Message =

Book by Arthur Conan Doyle

First edition

The Vital Message was written by Arthur Conan Doyle. It was first published in Britain in 1919 by Hodder & Stoughton.
