= Samuel Burdon Ellis =

British marine officer (1782–1865)

General Sir Samuel Burdon Ellis KCB
- Born: bapt. 10 March 1782; Deal, Kent, England
- Died: 10 March 1865 (aged 82) Lewisham, London, England
- Allegiance: United Kingdom
- Branch: Royal Marines
- Service years: 1804–1865
- Rank: General
- Conflicts: Napoleonic Wars; First Opium War
- Awards: Knight Commander of the Order of the Bath; Mentioned in Despatches

General Sir Samuel Burdon Ellis KCB (bapt. 10 March 1782 – 10 March 1865) was a senior Royal Marines officer.

== Early life ==
Ellis was born in 1782, the son of Captain Charles Ellis, R.N. and his wife Susanna.

== Life ==
Ellis entered the Royal Marine Light Infantry as a second lieutenant on 1 January 1804. He was at once sent on board ship, and, after first seeing service in Sir Robert Calder's action off Cape Finisterre, was present at the Battle of Trafalgar. He was quickly promoted to lieutenant in 1806. He was present in the Walcheren expedition in 1809 and in the capture of Guadeloupe in 1810, and being on board HMS Nymphe, was later employed off the coast. Firstly, he was employed off the coast of Spain and then of southern France during the latter years of the Peninsular war.

He specially distinguished himself in the operations which the navy took in helping to form the siege of Bayonne, after Wellington's victory of the Nive and Soult's retreat on Toulouse. His ship was then ordered to the North American coast, where she captured the American frigate USS President after a fierce fight, during which Ellis particularly distinguished himself, being the first man to board the enemy.

On the conclusion of peace, Ellis had no further opportunity to see service, and it was not until 15 November 1826, when he had been more than twenty years in the Marines, that he was promoted captain. It was not until many more years had passed, during which Ellis was employed in many different ships. He again saw service in the capture of Fort Manora, which commands the entrance to the harbour of Karachi, in 1839. He next commanded the marines employed in the Persian Gulf, and was mentioned in despatches for his services in bringing off the political resident at Bushire during a riot there, and saving his life.

When the First Opium War broke out in 1840, he was employed on the China station. For his services in command of a battalion of marines at the capture of Chusan on 5 July 1840, and at the Second Battle of Chuenpi on 7 January 1841, he was promoted major by brevet on 6 May 1841.

Before the news of his promotion reached him, he had still further distinguished himself with his marines in the bombardment of the Bogue forts. He commanded the advance on Canton, and the services of his men were so great at the storming of the Canton forts on 26 May 1841, that he was promoted lieutenant colonel by brevet, antedated to that day, and made a Companion of the Order of the Bath. He then commanded a battalion of marines at the Battle of Ningpo and the second capture of Chusan until the conclusion of the war, when he returned to England.

He was promoted colonel on 3 November 1851, and commanded the Chatham division of the Royal Marines, until he became major general on 20 June 1855. He was promoted lieutenant general in 1857, made a Knight Commander of the Order of the Bath in 1860, promoted general in 1862. He died at Old Charlton on 10 March 1865, after having been an officer of marines for more than sixty years, at the age of seventy-eight.

== Family ==
He was married twice; first, in 1819, to Catherine Matilda Meredith (1796–1847) with whom he had four children, including Alfred Burdon Ellis. Secondly, in 1851, to Louisa Drayson (1814–1894) with whom he had one son.
