= Inside Information =

Inside Information may refer to:

- Non-public information used in insider trading, of a corporation's stock or other securities (such as bonds or stock options)
- Inside Information, expose of the Gestapo by Hansjürgen Koehler 1940
- Inside Information, crime novel Nicholas Bentley 1978
- Inside Information (1934 film), an American film directed by Robert F. Hill
- Inside Information (1939 film), an American film directed by Charles Lamont
- Inside Information (horse) (born 1991), a racehorse and winner of Breeders' Cup Distaff
- Inside Information (album), a 1987 album by British-American rock band Foreigner, or the title track
- Inside information, United States Department of Agriculture Office of Information
