= Robert Lively (screenwriter) =

American screenwriter (d. 1943)

- Born: Robert Dawson Lively; February 3, 1905; Hinton, West Virginia, U.S.
- Died: March 4, 1943 (aged 38); New York City, New York, U.S.
- Occupations: Screenwriter, Songwriter
- Years active: 1925–1941
- Notable work: The Girl Said No
- Spouse: Betty Laidlaw (m. 1928)

Robert Dawson Lively (February 3, 1905–March 4, 1943), sometimes credited as Bob Lively, was an American screenwriter, songwriter, singer, actor, and director. As a writer and singer, Lively worked most often alongside his wife, pianist/composer Betty Laidlaw, and was active from the mid-1920s to at least 1940.

== Early life and career ==
Born in Hinton, West Virginia on February 3, 1905, but raised primarily in Charleston, Lively was the second son born to Etta Magdelen (née Lewis) and Wilson Wise Lively. In the week following his death, it was noted that Lively's music career had begun with his work as a choir boy in a Charleston church. He later attended military schools, before making his way to New York.

In March 1926 (in an act later described, variously, as "a team of writers, composers, and lyricists,' and "a dynamical musical act at the piano"), Lively and his then accompanist and soon-to-be wife—billed initially as "Lady Betty Laidlaw—began giving radio recitals on station WHN.

In the fall of 1935, their original play, a backstage musical / murder mystery titled Death in the Dressing Room, debuted over the BBC.

In 1937, Laidlaw and Lively signed a four-year contract with Grand National Pictures, terms of which included a minimum of four scripts a year, with the option of "work[ing] for others in between GN assignments." Unfortunately for all parties concerned, GN's bold projection may have succeeded, if at all, only in hastening L&L's demise. In any event, Personal Secretary, the last of three scripts the team managed to crank out almost within the allotted one-year window, proved to be the final credit in Laidlaw's short-lived screenwriting career.

== Personal life and death ==
By no later than March 1928, Lively had married his then fellow performer and future writing partner, Betty Laidlaw. (Note: Born Betty Morse Meyers, she had also previously been billed as Betty Baird, both stage names derived from ex-husband Loper B. Laidlaw.)),

On April 4, 1943, aged 38 and said to residing "in a New York hotel" (or, more specifically, "his apartment" at Manhattan's Hotel Mansfield), Lively died in his bed, his death attributed to "a heart disease". Employed, at that time, as a special consultant to the Army Signal Corps Photographic Center in Astoria, Queens, Lively was survived by his wife, as well as his mother, uncle, two brothers and one sister.

== Selected filmography ==
- Enlighten Thy Daughter, 1934 (additional dialogue)
- Inside Information, 1934 (screenplay)
- The Marriage Bargain, 1935
- Custer's Last Stand, 1936 (story dialogue)
- The Black Coin, 1936 (adaptation and screenplay)
- Sandflow, 1937 (songs: "Sandflow" and "We Are the Rangers")
- Rhythm Racketeer, 1937 (story)
- The Girl Said No, 1937
- Tough to Handle, 1937 (adaptation)
- Danger on the Air, 1938 (screenplay)
- Personal Secretary, 1938 (story "The Comet")
- The Great Victor Herbert, 1939 (screenplay / story)
- Isle of Destiny, 1940 (screenplay)
- The Hard-Boiled Canary, 1941 (story and screenplay)
