= Overture di Ballo =

1870 concert overture by Arthur Sullivan

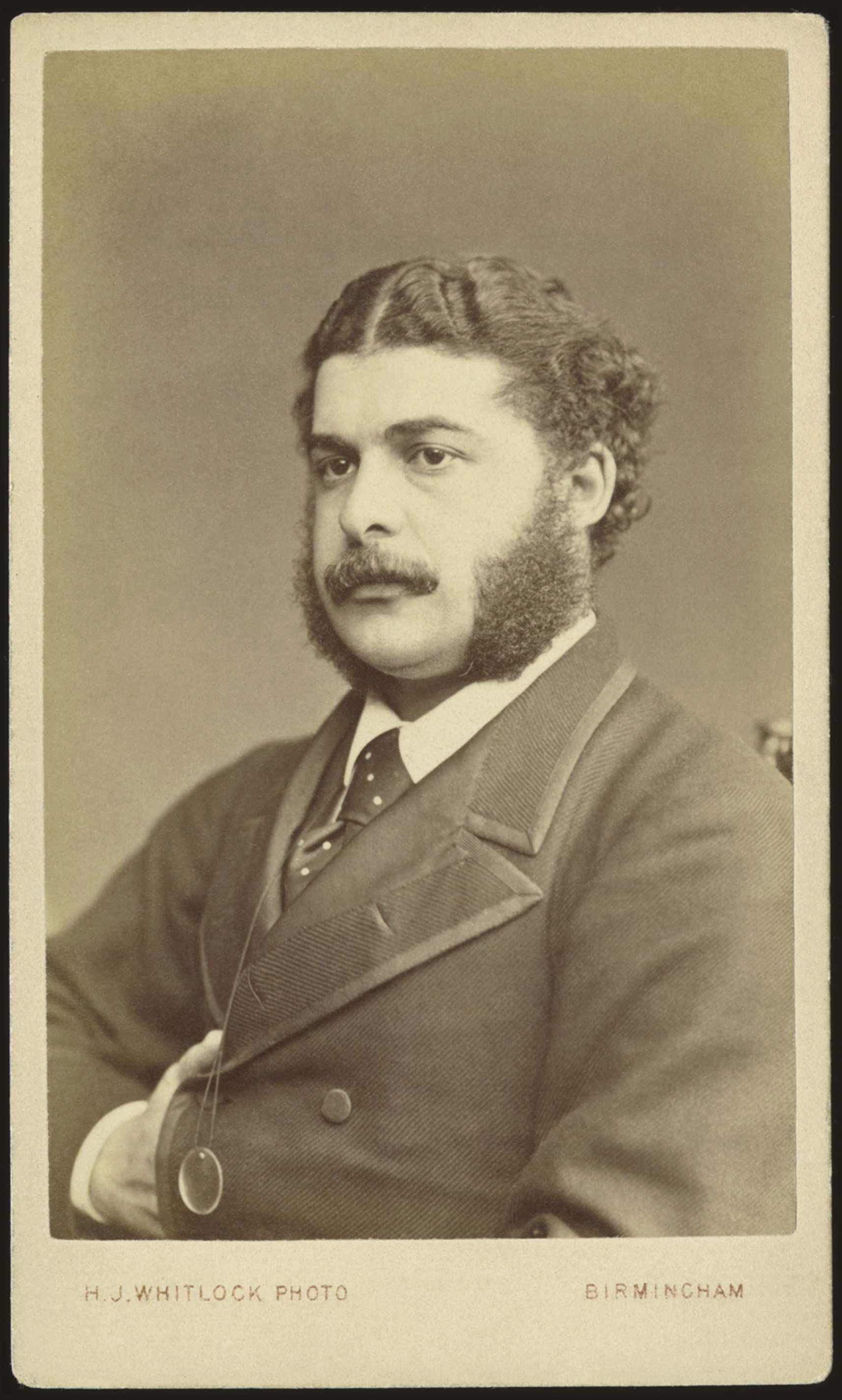
Sullivan, c. 1870

Overture di Ballo
Overture di Ballo, in a military band arrangement, performed by United States Marine Band.

The Overture di Ballo is a concert overture by Arthur Sullivan. Its first performance was in August 1870 at the Birmingham Triennial Festival, conducted by the composer. It predates all his work with W. S. Gilbert, and is his most frequently recorded concert work for orchestra.

== Name ==
The title of the work as printed on the original programme was Overtura di Ballo. When the score was published in 1889, the hybrid title Overture di Ballo was used. Arthur Jacobs suggests that it would have been better if Sullivan had called it A Dance Overture.

== Description ==
The work consists of a short emphatic introduction, followed by three distinct but thematically linked sections:

- a slow opening section in polonaise rhythm.
- a longer waltz section with the first subject played by the woodwinds and the second (syncopated) subject by the strings.
- a lively galop as a finale.

The version of the score published during Sullivan's lifetime takes eleven minutes or so in performance. The whereabouts of the composer's autograph score were not publicly known until Terence Rees purchased it at auction in 1966. In the 1980s, a longer version of the score was prepared, drawing on Sullivan’s manuscript and including two passages deleted by the composer before the original 1889 publication. One of the two is a formal recapitulation of the first waltz subject, making the whole middle section a classical example of sonata form. Most performances in concert or on record use the shorter version, but the D'Oyly Carte Opera Company's 1992 recording uses the uncut text.

The work is scored for 2 flutes, piccolo, 2 oboes, 2 clarinets in B♭, 2 bassoons, 4 horns in E♭, 2 valve-trumpets in E♭, 3 trombones, ophicleide or bass tuba, extra bass tuba ad lib., 2 timpani, cymbals, bass drum, triangle, side drum, and strings. Originally the two lowest brass parts were assigned to ophicleide and serpent, as those instruments were used in the Birmingham Festival orchestra despite their imminent obsolescence, but Sullivan suggested to the conductor Alfred Broughton in a subsequent 1880s pre-publication performance in Leeds that a tuba be used instead of the ophicleide and a contrabassoon instead of the serpent.

== Analysis and reception ==
What makes the piece unusual is that (the first waltz tune excepted) all three dances use the same melodic theme. The rhythmic and harmonic treatment, however, gives each dance its own character. Liszt had developed this technique, but its use in a light orchestral piece was new. Sullivan later used the technique in his comic operas: for example the Lord Chancellor’s motif in Iolanthe, which appears in three different forms. After Sullivan’s death, Elgar adopted and extended the technique in his First Symphony, where the scherzo is scarcely recognisable as transformed in the adagio.

The piece was well received at its premiere in Birmingham. Reviewing a performance of the overture at The Crystal Palace a month later, the critic for The Times wrote, "A more sparkling and animated orchestral piece of its kind it would be difficult to name." The contemporary critic Henry Lunn wrote in The Musical Times, "Mr Sullivan's themes are so melodious [combining] instinct with refined feeling, his instrumentation so graceful and ingenious, and his treatment of the subjects so thoroughly musician-like, that his composition appeals as much to the educated as to the uneducated ear".

A section of the galop is the only music used by Sir Charles Mackerras in his ballet Pineapple Poll that is not taken from Sullivan's operas.

== Recordings ==
The Overture di Ballo is the most frequently recorded of Sullivan's non-operatic compositions. As of 2021, recordings conducted by Sir Adrian Boult, Anthony Collins, Alexander Faris, Arthur Fiedler, Sir Charles Groves, Tom Higgins, Sir Charles Mackerras, Sir Neville Marriner, John Pryce-Jones, and Sir Malcolm Sargent (two recordings) were or had been available in the UK.

== See also ==
- Overture in C, "In Memoriam"
- Marmion overture
- List of compositions by Arthur Sullivan

== Sources ==
- Jacobs, Arthur (1984). Arthur Sullivan: A Victorian Musician. Oxford and New York: Oxford University Press. ISBN 978-0-19-315443-8.
- Reed, W. H. (1943). Elgar. London: Dent. OCLC 8858707.
