= A. E. Kaye =

American sound engineer

- Died: February 3, 1987
- Occupation: Sound engineer
- Years active: 1937-1938

A. E. Kaye (died on February 3, 1987) was a sound engineer. He was nominated for an Academy Award in the category Best Sound Recording for the film The Girl Said No.

== Selected filmography ==
- The Girl Said No (1937)
