= The Girl Said No =

The Girl Said No may refer to:

- The Girl Said No (1930 film), a romantic comedy starring William Haines and Leila Hyams
- The Girl Said No (1937 film), a musical comedy featuring Robert Armstrong and Irene Hervey
