= Mark Savage (playwright) =

American dramatist

Mark Savage (born September 19, 1958) is an American playwright, songwriter, and theatre director. He specializes in gay musical theatre and is associated with the Celebration Theatre in Los Angeles. His coming-out musical The Ballad Of Little Mikey, premiered in 1994 and has had productions in a dozen US cities. He wrote a song for Naked Boys Singing, an Off-Broadway musical review that ran for six years. He curated a reading series called "Queering the Classics," which in 2001 spawned Pinafore!, a gay adaptation of Gilbert & Sullivan's HMS Pinafore. Pinafore! won Best Musical at the LA Weekly Theatre Awards and Best Production at the 2003 New York International Fringe Festival and the Original cast recording was released by Belva Records.
