= Rhythm Racketeer =

- Lobby card
- Directed by: James Seymour
- Written by: Jack Byrd; Betty Laidlaw; Robert Lively; James Seymour
- Produced by: Joe Rock
- Starring: Harry Roy; Princess Pearl; James Carew
- Cinematography: Ernest Palmer
- Edited by: Sam Simmonds
- Music by: Harry Roy; Stanley Black
- Production company: Joe Rock Productions
- Distributed by: British Independent Exhibitors' Distributors
- Release date: October 1937
- Running time: 84 minutes
- Country: United Kingdom
- Language: English

Rhythm Racketeer is a 1937 British musical film directed by James Seymour and starring Harry Roy, Princess Pearl and James Carew. It was written by Jack Byrd, Betty Laidlaw, Robert Lively and James Seymour, and made at Rock Studios, Elstree, by the independent producer Joe Rock.

== Cast ==
- Harry Roy as Harry Grant and Napoleon Connors
- Princess Pearl as Karen Vosper
- James Carew as Clinton Vosper
- Norma Varden as Della Nash
- Johnny Hines as Nifty
- Johnnie Schofield as Spike
- Judith Wood as Lola
- Georgie Harris as The Rat
- Syd Crossley as minor role
- George Merritt as Inspector Hunt
- Charles Paton as assistant in chemist shop
- James Pirrie as Bugs Cole
- Pamela Randall as minor role
- Terry-Thomas as extra

== Reception ==
The Daily Film Renter wrote: "Stilted treatment and banal plot against London, New York and liner backgrounds, with song and spectacle sequences. Personality show from star in typical numbers, but acting otherwise patchy and direction slipshod. Comedy material and dialogue childish, but general effect makes fair popular subject on melody angles and stellar pull."

Kine Weekly wrote: "Harry Roy frequently drops the baton, to essay a dual role, but finds the responsibility beyond his compass. The story, too, is weak, nor is the Anglo-American atmosphere convincing. The tunes and lavish technical trimmings are really the high spots of the production. Moderate light booking, mainly on star potentialities, for industrial and provincial halls."

Picturegoer wrote: "Dance band interludes punctuate this gangster comedy-drama, which, in trying to emulate American pictures of the same type, falls down and fails to register at all effectively. Harry Roy lacks the experience to put over the dual role of Napoleon, American gangster on a visit to London, and Harry, a dance-band leader. Princess Pearl is quite good as the heroine whom Harry protects from rival gangsters. The music is the best part of the production."
