= Personal Secretary =

1938 comedy film

- Theatrical release poster
- Directed by: Otis Garrett
- Screenplay by: Betty Laidlaw; Robert Lively; Charles Grayson
- Story by: Betty Laidlaw; Robert Lively
- Produced by: Max Golden
- Starring: William Gargan; Joy Hodges; Andy Devine; Ruth Donnelly; Samuel S. Hinds; Frances Robinson
- Cinematography: Stanley Cortez
- Edited by: Frank Gross
- Production company: Universal Pictures
- Distributed by: Universal Pictures
- Release date: September 9, 1938
- Running time: 61 minutes
- Country: United States
- Language: English

Personal Secretary is a 1938 American comedy film directed by Otis Garrett and written by Betty Laidlaw, Robert Lively and Charles Grayson. The film stars William Gargan, Joy Hodges, Andy Devine, Ruth Donnelly, Samuel S. Hinds and Frances Robinson. The film was released on September 9, 1938, by Universal Pictures.

== Plot ==
Columnists from two rival newspapers go back and forth over whether or not a woman murdered her playboy husband.

== Cast ==
- William Gargan as Marcus 'Mark' Farrell
- Joy Hodges as Gale Rodgers
- Andy Devine as 'Snoop' Lewis
- Ruth Donnelly as Grumpy
- Samuel S. Hinds as Alan Lemke
- Frances Robinson as June Reese
- Florence Roberts as Mrs. J. J. Farrell
- Kay Linaker as Flo Sampson
- Matty Fain as 'Slim' Logan
- Selmer Jackson as Blackmere
