= Inside the Gestapo =

1939 book

Inside the Gestapo: Hitler's Shadow over the World is a 1939 book partially published in serial form in the Manchester Guardian, and then in full by Pallas Publishing Co. Ltd, 12 Herietta Street, London, WC 2, 1940, under the pseudonym Hansjürgen Koehler by the German political exile Walter Korodi (1902–1983). In part the work contained the genuine manuscript "Hinter den Kulissen des 3. Reiches" (Behind the scenes of the Third Reich) by Heinrich Pfeifer (1905–1949) a former Gestapo official, which the author had sent to Pallas, but had never received a reply. A second volume by Korodi as Hansjürgen Koehler entitled Inside Information appeared in 1940. The books gained significant press coverage in Britain in 1939 and 1940.
