= Inside Information (1934 film) =

1934 film by Robert F. Hill

- Directed by: Robert F. Hill
- Written by: Bert Ennis (story) and Victor Potel (story); Betty Laidlaw (screenplay) and Robert Lively (screenplay)
- Produced by: Albert Herman (associate producer); Bert Sternbach (producer)
- Starring: See below
- Cinematography: George Meehan
- Release date: September 25, 1934
- Running time: 48 minutes
- Country: United States
- Language: English

Inside Information is a 1934 American film directed by Robert F. Hill.

== Cast ==
- Rex Lease as Lloyd Wilson
- Marion Shilling as Anne Seton
- Tarzan as Tarzan, the police dog
- Philo McCullough as Durand
- Henry Hall as Mr. Seton
- Charles King as "Blackie" Black
- Jean Porter as Gertie
- Robert McKenzie as Mack, Fat Detective
- Victor Potel as Rice, Thin Detective
- Robert F. Hill as Police Chief Gallagher
- Henry Roquemore as Police Commissioner
- Vance Carroll as Traffic Cop
- Charles Harper as Henchman
- Jimmy Aubrey as Henry, Durand's Houseboy
- Baby Woods as Georgie, Toddler
