= The Girl Said No (1937 film) =

1937 film by Andrew L. Stone

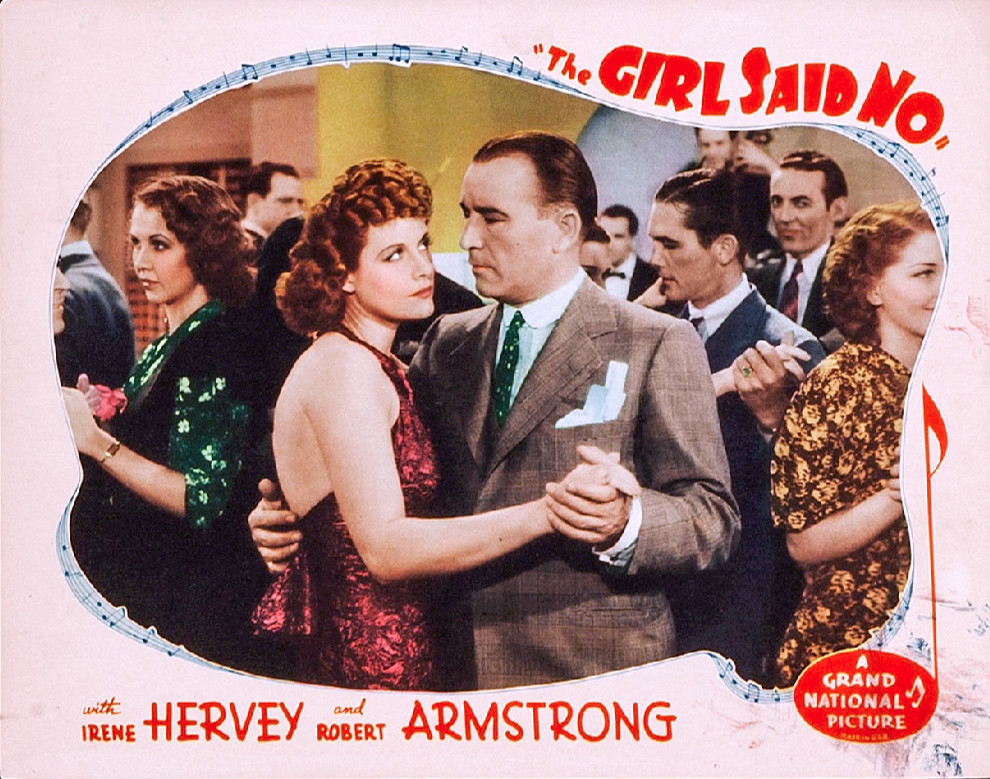
- Directed by: Andrew L. Stone
- Written by: Betty Laidlaw; Robert Lively; Andrew L. Stone
- Produced by: Edward L. Alperson; Andrew L. Stone
- Starring: Robert Armstrong; Irene Hervey; Paula Stone
- Cinematography: Ira H. Morgan
- Edited by: Thomas Neff
- Music by: Arthur Kay; Gilbert and Sullivan
- Production company: Andrew L. Stone Productions
- Distributed by: Grand National Pictures
- Release date: October 15, 1937
- Running time: 76 minutes
- Country: United States
- Language: English

The Girl Said No, complete film

The Girl Said No (aka With Words and Music) is a 1937 American musical comedy film produced by Andrew L. Stone and Edward L. Alperson for Grand National Pictures and directed by Andrew L. Stone. The screenplay was written by Betty Laidlaw, Robert Lively and Andrew L. Stone. The film stars Robert Armstrong, Irene Hervey and Paula Stone. It uses musical numbers from Gilbert and Sullivan operas, and the story is about a shady bookie who is in love with a greedy dance hall girl and schemes to get her back after she rejects him. Along the way, he revives a failing Gilbert and Sullivan troupe.

== Plot ==
Jimmie, a shady bookie, meets Pearl, a taxi dance hall girl. He takes her out on several dates, pretending to be a high profile producer. She is happy to spend his money extravagantly but refuses to be his girlfriend. To get revenge, Jimmie promises to make her a Broadway star and becomes her manager. He takes her to expensive dinners and meetings with people in the top entertainment circles.

Jimmie tricks Pearl into signing a contract under which most of her earnings go to him. He persuades a defunct Gilbert and Sullivan troupe to re-form, obtains an empty theatre for a night, and fills it by blackmail. They play The Mikado, which is deservedly a hit. Overwhelmed with regret over his deceit, he proposes, and she, overwhelmed with gratitude over his support, accepts.

== Cast ==
- Robert Armstrong as Jimmie Allen
- Irene Hervey as Pearl Proctor / Peep-Bo
- Paula Stone as Mabel
- Edward Brophy as Pick
- William Danforth as Howard Hathaway / The Mikado
- Vera Ross as Beatrice Hathaway / Katisha
- Richard Tucker as Charles Dillon
- Harry Tyler as Chuck Fairfax
- Gwili Andre as Gretchen Holman
- Max Davidson as Max
- Josef Swickard as Jonesy
- Bert Roach as Sugar Plum
- Horace Murphy as Joe
- Vivian Hart as Beatrice / Pitti-Sing
- Frank Moulan as Mark / Ko-Ko
- Allen Rogers as John / The Minstrel
- Carita Crawford as Yum Yum
- Mildred Rogers as Peggy
- Arthur Kay as Adolph / Conductor
- Carl Stockdale as Lockwood - a Critic
- Claire Rochelle as Miss Pringle aka Angel
- Rolfe Sedan as Headwaiter at the Ritz
- Isabel La Mal as Lady Sylvia
- Lester Dorr as Dick Barnes - Theatre Manager

== Production ==
Grand National Pictures obtained a license from the D'Oyly Carte Opera Company for the copyrights to use the Gilbert and Sullivan words and music in the film for distribution in the United States. It was stipulated, however, that if the film was to be distributed in the British Isles and elsewhere, then music from American operettas was to be used instead, because the D'Oyly Carte Opera Company was still touring the Gilbert and Sullivan operas at that time.

== Awards ==
The film was nominated for an Academy Award in the category Best Sound (A. E. Kaye).
