= Overture in C, "In Memoriam" =

Orchestral work by Arthur Sullivan

The Overture in C, "In Memoriam", by Arthur Sullivan, premiered on 30 October 1866 at the Norwich Festival, in honour of his father, who died just before composition began.

The piece was written early in Sullivan's career, before he began to work with his famous collaborator, W. S. Gilbert, on their series of Savoy Operas. The sombre piece was well received. It was first published by Novello almost twenty years later, in 1885.

== Background and history ==
In late 1864, Sullivan received commissions to write overtures for the Philharmonic Society of London and the Norwich Festival. The first, Marmion, was to be based on Sir Walter Scott's 1808 poem, but the second had no theme assigned. Inspiration for the Norwich Festival commission came with the sudden death of Sullivan's father in September, 1866. Sullivan turned his grief to the completion of this overture.

The premiere was conducted by Norwich Festival music director Julius Benedict. It was well received; the reviewer in The Observer wrote that the piece "expresses with wonderful force and clearness of intention the various phases of an all-absorbing, poignant sorrow, from the first overwhelming burst of passionate grief to the calm resignation which time and a higher teaching alone can bring." The overture enjoyed considerable popularity in the composer's own lifetime, but it was rarely heard in the 20th century. Outside of Britain, performances were conducted by the composer in Leipzig, Germany, with the Gewandhaus Orchestra (1867); by Jules Pasdeloup in Paris, with the Orchestre de la Société des concerts du Conservatoire (1879); and Theodore Thomas in Chicago, Illinois, with the Theodore Thomas Orchestra (1886).

Only two recordings were made before 1992. Since then the piece has been recorded several more times.

== Structure ==
The composition is structured as a single multi-tempo movement marked Andante religioso - Allegro molto and lasts around eleven to twelve minutes in performance.

The critic Andrew Lamb writes that, although the composer described the overture as an outpouring of grief,

its pervading tone is not one of sadness so much as deep affection. It contains charming melodies, so much so that the work’s major shortcoming is perhaps that its plaintive main theme, heard first on the oboe, does not quite stand up to its grandiose climactic chorale treatment for full orchestra, complete with organ.

The piece's dark, slow texture has its main theme in the major key, as seen here in its first appearance in Myles B. Foster's piano reduction:

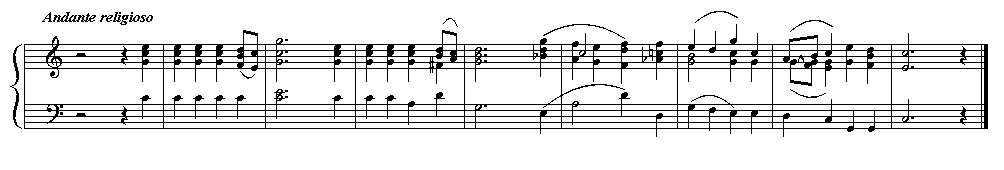

This theme reaches its final, grandest restatement in the last section of the overture. The musical scholar Arthur Jacobs comments that the slow hymn-like tune, with its repetition of the single note, "traps Sullivan into banality". Gervase Hughes in a study of Sullivan's music, however, writes that the work has "a solid dignity that is quite impressive".

== See also ==
- Overture di Ballo
- List of compositions by Arthur Sullivan
