= Marmion (Sullivan) =

"The Death of Marmion", by Edward Armitage, c. 1842

Marmion is a concert overture composed by Arthur Sullivan and premiered in 1867 by the Philharmonic Society of London, which commissioned the work. It was the first and longest of Sullivan's concert overtures and was inspired by Sir Walter Scott's 1808 epic poem Marmion: A Tale of Flodden Field.

Sullivan revised it in 1874 and reused it, heavily cut, as the overture to his incidental music for J. Comyns Carr's play King Arthur, staged by Henry Irving in 1895. The score was not published in the composer's lifetime but has subsequently been edited, published and recorded.

== Background ==
Arthur Sullivan was twenty-five when he composed the Marmion overture. He had already composed three substantial concert works – the Irish Symphony, the In Memoriam overture and the Cello Concerto – as well as his first comic opera, Cox and Box (all 1866). Marmion was commissioned by the Philharmonic Society of London, whose earlier commissions included Beethoven's Ninth Symphony and Mendelssohn's Italian Symphony.

Sullivan was an admirer of the works of Sir Walter Scott. The composer's cantata The Masque at Kenilworth drew on Scott's 1821 novel Kenilworth, and his only grand opera, Ivanhoe, is based on Scott's novel of the same title. Marmion was inspired by Scott's epic poem Marmion: A Tale of Flodden Field, published in 1808. The events described take place in 1513 and concern Lord Marmion, a fictitious aristocratic villain at the court of Henry VIII, who is involved in various acts of treachery before being killed in the Battle of Flodden Field.

== Performances and description ==
The work was first given at a Philharmonic Society concert at St James's Hall, London, on 3 June 1867, conducted by the society's recently appointed conductor, William Cusins. Sullivan revised the score in 1874 and used an abbreviated version of it as the overture to his incidental music for J. Comyns Carr's play King Arthur, staged by Henry Irving in 1895.

For the first time in 127 years, Marmion was played in its original length in 2004 in performances in Glasgow and later Edinburgh.

== Description and reactions ==
The overture opens with a slow introduction, followed by a longer, quicker section. The Times said after the premiere:

Mr Sullivan’s Marmion has no pretensions to a "character-overture". Nevertheless, it is eminently picturesque, and has, here and there, just enough of the Scottish turn of melody to suggest so much of the Scottish element as is an ingredient in the story of Marmion. It consists of a highly interesting introduction, in slow measure, and a spirited and well worked out quick movement. The themes are clear and striking, the treatment broad and ingenious, and the orchestration masterly. In short, Mr Sullivan has composed a new work calculated to enhance the reputation so well earned by his overture In Memoriam.

In 1902, the composer and teacher Alexander Mackenzie wrote of the work, "Marmion … the longest of his Concert Overtures, is brilliantly romantic, and the only composition of his which suggests (to my mind) the manner of Weber. For unknown reasons, he hesitated to publish it, but it certainly does not merit the neglect, and ought to be better known than it is". Gramophone said of the first recording of the original score, "The chivalrous sweep of the Marmion Overture ... holds up well against (say) Elgar's Froissart.

== Recordings and broadcasts ==
The cut version from 1895 was recorded for Decca Records in 1977 by the Royal Philharmonic Orchestra conducted by Royston Nash. The original full version was recorded in 2016 for Dutton Vocalion by the BBC Concert Orchestra, conducted by John Andrews. A contemporary reviewer found the latter "full of Romantic swagger and broad-brush drama".

In 2005 Sir Roger Norrington and the Stuttgart Radio Symphony Orchestra recorded the King Arthur version of Marmion, which was broadcast on Südwestrundfunk the same year.

== Score ==
The full score, edited by Robin Gordon-Powell, has been published by The Amber Ring.

== Sources ==
- Jacobs, Arthur (1984). Arthur Sullivan: A Victorian Musician. Oxford and New York: Oxford University Press. ISBN 978-0-19-315443-8.
- Mackenzie, Alexander C. (May 1902). "The Life-Work of Arthur Sullivan". Sammelbände der Internationalen Musikgesellschaft: 539–564. (subscription required)
- Young, Percy M. (1971). Sir Arthur Sullivan. London: J. M. Dent & Sons. ISBN 978-0-460-03934-5.
