= The Merry Wives of Windsor (Sullivan) =

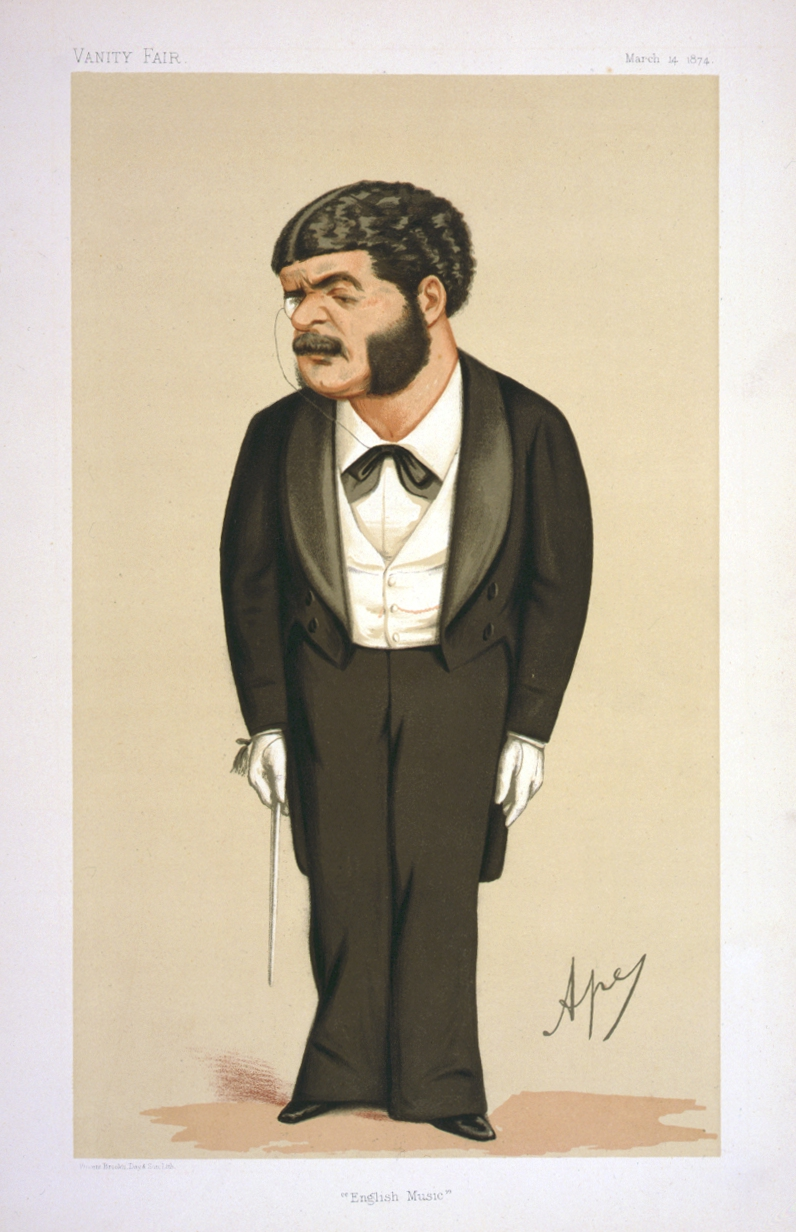
Sullivan in 1874, as seen by the cartoonist Carlo Pellegrini ("Ape")

Arthur Sullivan wrote incidental music for a production of the then seldom staged Shakespeare comedy The Merry Wives of Windsor presented for the 1874–75 Christmas season at the Gaiety Theatre in London. This was the third suite of incidental music that Sullivan wrote for a play. The music, though well received, is not among the composer's best-known, but has been recorded and released on CD and online.

== Background and premiere ==
The impresario John Hollingshead, who ran the Gaiety Theatre in London from 1868 to 1886, was well acquainted with the music of Arthur Sullivan, whom he had brought together with the librettist W. S. Gilbert in their first collaboration, the comic opera Thespis in 1871. For his 1874 Christmas production at the Gaiety he engaged the veteran actor Samuel Phelps to play Falstaff in a rare revival of Shakespeare's comedy The Merry Wives of Windsor with a starry supporting cast that included Rose Leclercq and Mrs John Wood as the merry wives, Hermann Vezin as Ford, Forbes Robertson as Fenton and Arthur Cecil as Dr Caius. He invited Sullivan to compose incidental music for the production.

Hollingshead commissioned a set of words from A. C. Swinburne for an additional song set by Sullivan for the character Anne Page, the female juvenile lead. The Sullivan scholar Selwyn Tillett suggests that this may have been intended as an inducement to Sullivan accept the commission to write the music. Sullivan hesitated to do so, because, as he wrote to his friend the critic Joseph Bennett, he saw no opening for music in most of the play, and felt obliged to confine the music to the fifth, final act. The actress playing Anne, Teresa Furtado, was not much of a singer, and the composer kept his setting of Swinburne's words “very simple and easy” – so much so that that he feared it might be found commonplace. In his earlier music for Shakespeare plays – The Tempest (1861) and The Merchant of Venice (1871) – he had included a substantial introduction or overture, as he was to do again in his later score for Macbeth (1888), but he decided not to do so for The Merry Wives of Windsor because, as he told Bennett, "I did not care about competing with the very pretty one of Nicolai". (Note: Nicolai's 1848 opera Die lustigen Weiber von Windsor, still staged in Germany but only occasionally revived elsewhere, had – and has – an overture popular as a stand-alone concert piece. WorldCat lists recordings of Nicolai's overture conducted by Leonard Bernstein, Willi Boskovsky, Colin Davis, Gustavo Dudamel, Wilhelm Furtwängler, Herbert von Karajan, Erich Kleiber, Carlos Kleiber, Hans Knappertsbusch, Charles Mackerras, Neville Marriner and many others.)

Sullivan had only three weeks to compose his score, and – as he did several times in his career – he repurposed music written for earlier works. (Note: In 1990 Roderick Spencer and Selwyn Tillett found that Sullivan reused music from his 1864 ballet, L'Île Enchantée, in his opera Thespis and in other works.) Into the introductory music for Act V and the ensuing scene between Anne and the chorus disguised as fairies he imported two themes from his ballet L'Île enchantée first given at Covent Garden in 1864 but which, in the words of the scholar Arthur Jacobs, "did not remain long in the repertory". Although influenced by Mendelssohn in several of his works, Sullivan here took care to avoid the precedent of the former's delicate fairy music for A Midsummer Night's Dream (1842) because, he said, the Windsor fairies "are not real fairies (if such exist) but only flesh and blood imitations". Tillett comments that Sullivan's music here "has a straightforward jollity which exactly catches the mood of the pantomime season".

Hollingshead's production was well received by press and public, and ran from 19 December 1874 to 13 February 1875.

== Music ==
- Prelude ("Moonlight") and Dance of Fairies
- Song – Andante (Anne), lyric by Swinburne:

Love laid his sleepless head
On a thorny rosy bed,
And his eyes with tears were red,
And pale his lips as the dead.

And fear and sorrow and scorn
Kept watch by his head forlorn,
'Till the night was overworn,
And the world was merry with morn.

And joy came up with the day,
And kiss'd love's lips as he lay,
And the watchers ghostly and grey,
Fled from his pillow away.

And his eyes at the dawn grew bright,
And his lips wax'd ruddy as light.
Sorrow may reign for a night,
But day shall bring back delight.

- Melodrama and song (Anne and chorus):

Fairies, black, grey, green, and white,
You moonshine revellers, and shades of night,
You orphan heirs of fixed destiny,
Attend your office and your quality.
About, about, about, about,
Search Windsor Castle within and out.
Strew good luck, ouphes, on ev'ry sacred room. (Note: "Ouphe" is an old word for "elf" or "goblin".)
That it may stand till the perpetual doom,
In state most wholesome as in state 'tis fit
Worthy the owner, and the owner it.
Away! disperse!
But till 'tis one o'clock,
Our dance of custom round about the oak
Of Herne the hunter, let us not forget

- Dance round the oak tree (Allegro vivace)
- Dance with chorus (Allegro vivace):

Fie on sinful phantasy.
Fie on lust and luxury.
Pinch him, fairies, mutually;
Pinch him for his villany.
Pinch him and burn him and turn him about.

In his book about Sullivan (1971) Percy Young describes the music for The Merry Wives of Windsor as "a felicitous continuation in the manner of The Tempest music (more, in fact, than that of the more balletic Merchant of Venice)". Young writes that the "Moonlight" music introducing Act V – with "more than a hint" of Weber" – is in Sullivan's favoured key of E major, "warm with wood-wind chords and made romantic by the seductive contours of solo clarinet" in one section reused from L'Île enchantée. Young finds a midnight chill in the music that follows, with opening semiquavers given within an E minor triad, after which the humanity of the purported fairies is emphasised in "a hardly disguised can-can reference".

For the second movement, the entrance of Anne and the fairy chorus, Sullivan deploys the second of his two borrowings from L'Île enchantée; an E minor theme for woodwind over pizzicato lower strings. The flute and oboe figure in the song for Anne that follows is, in Young's analysis, "closely related to that of the Fairy Queen's Invocation in Iolanthe".

In his study of Sullivan's music (1959) Gervase Hughes comments that Sullivan's music for the "fairies" tormenting Falstaff ("pinch him and burn him and turn him about") foreshadows Verdi's treatment of the same passage ("pizzica, pizzica") in his 1893 Falstaff.

== Reception ==
Bennett's review in The Daily Telegraph commented that although it was understandable that Sullivan had not written an overture, "we hope that the omission will even yet be supplied [and] would assuredly be unlike that of Nicolai, while in its way just as good, if not better". Bennett praised the "Moonlight" prelude as "one of those illustrations of peaceful loveliness in which the true genius of a true musician rises to the height of perfect poetry". The Pall Mall Gazette thought the Swinburne song "a superfluity" but praised Sullivan for his "tuneful and vivacious" music.

== Recording ==
Andrew Penny conducted the RTÉ Concert Orchestra in a recording of the suite made in 1993 and released on CD in 1995.

== Notes, references and sources ==
=== Sources ===
- Bennett, Joseph (1908). Forty Years of Music, 1865–1905. London: Methuen. OCLC 890645.
- Hughes, Gervase (1959). The Music of Sir Arthur Sullivan. London: Macmillan. OCLC 500626743.
- Jacobs, Arthur (1984). Arthur Sullivan: A Victorian Musician. Oxford and New York: Oxford University Press. ISBN 978-0-19-315443-8.
- Tillett, Selwyn (1998). The Ballets of Arthur Sullivan. Coventry, UK: Sir Arthur Sullivan Society.
- Young, Percy M. (1971). Sir Arthur Sullivan. London: J. M. Dent & Sons. ISBN 978-0-460-03934-5.
