= Henry VIII (Sullivan) =

Arthur Sullivan in the 1870s

Arthur Sullivan's music for Henry VIII is the fourth of the composer's sets of incidental music for Shakespeare plays. It consists of four sections – one of them vocal – later arranged by Sullivan into a concert suite. The music was first heard in the production of Henry VIII at the Theatre Royal, Manchester, in August 1877; the suite was premiered at the Crystal Palace, London, two months later. It is not among Sullivan's best-known music, but the full score has been published and the suite recorded for CD.

== Background and premieres ==
In 1877, immediately after declining an invitation from Lewis Carroll to set some of the songs from Alice's Adventures in Wonderland, Sullivan accepted a commission from the actor-manager Charles Calvert to compose incidental music for a rare revival of Shakespeare's Henry VIII. Calvert had commissioned Sullivan's music for his production of The Merchant of Venice at his theatre, the Prince's, in Manchester in 1871. By 1874 Calvert had moved to the Theatre Royal, Manchester, where he mounted a season including Shakespeare's Timon of Athens and Byron's Sardanapalus and then, following a visit from Henry Irving's company in Richard III, a new and lavish production of Henry VIII with William Belford as Henry, Geneviève Ward as Catherine of Aragon and Calvert as Cardinal Wolsey.

As he often did, Sullivan left composition until the last moment, and Calvert's opening night had to be postponed from 27 August 1877 to 29 August. Sullivan's new music was confined to the fifth act of the play. The song "Orpheus with His Lute" was sung in the third act, but whether that was to Sullivan's existing setting (1866) is not recorded in press reviews, although The Examiner mentioned that the Water Music in Act V contained snatches of that version. The rest of the "historical music incidental to the play" was selected, arranged and conducted by the composer Frederick Stanislaus. Sullivan's music was premiered as a concert suite at a Crystal Palace concert on 6 October 1877, conducted by August Manns.

== Music ==
The suite consists of four movements, three of which are entirely orchestral and one with solo voice and chorus. The orchestration is for one each of flute, piccolo, oboe, clarinet in A, bassoon, two cornets, and four horns in D, two trombones, bass trombone, tuba, percussion (triangle, tambour, bass drum, cymbals) and strings.

=== March ===
The opening movement is a vigorous allegro moderato alla marcia in D major, ♩=108. At the time of the first performance, The Examiner thought it "brilliantly scored and full of festive pomp and rejoicing", but it contains prominent cornet parts to which both Gervase Hughes and Percy Young in their studies of Sullivan's music take exception. Hughes writes that the cornet flourishes "hold no charm for a sophisticated listener" and for Young the march is "of a coarseness of which the aptness is only accidental".

=== King Henry's Song ===
The movement, in F major, is marked andante con moto, ♩=80, and is scored for strings and woodwinds, without brass or percussion. On the royal barge, between Blackfriars and Greenwich, a masque is performed, with a song to words written not by Shakespeare but traditionally supposed to be by the real Henry VIII:

Youth will needs have dalliance,
Of good or ill some pastance; (Note: The Oxford English Dictionary defines "pastance" as a 16th-century word meaning "recreation" or "pastime".)
Company methinks the best
All thoughts and fancies to digest,
For idleness
Is chief mistress
Of vices all;
Then who can say
But pass the day
Is best of all?

Pastime with good company
I love, and shall until I die;
Grudge who will, but not deny,
So God be pleas'd this life will I;
For my pastance
Hunt, sing, and dance;
My heart is set,
All goodly sport
To my comfort,
Who shall me let?

Company with honesty
Is virtue, and vice to flee;
Company is good or ill,
But ev'ry man hath his free will.
The best I sue,
The worst eschew;
My mind shall be
Virtue to use;
Vice to refuse
I shall use me.

The text is among the Royal manuscripts in the British Library but the traditional ascription to the king of either the original music or the words cannot be proved.

Young finds the song "as charming as any insouciant and amorous song by Campion or Rosseter or Morley". In Young's view, Sullivan was not deliberately pastiching the madrigalists "but his unconscious recollections of the composers of airs, especially in a supposed sixteenth/seventeenth-century setting, are quite striking".

=== Graceful Dance ===
Allegretto grazioso in A major, 𝅗𝅥 = 76. This was the best-received of the four movements: The Times called it "exquisitely graceful", The Evening Standard found it "certainly the most charming of the four movements, and scored in the happiest manner". Young finds the movement "charming, mannered [with] the quality of Delibes".

The movement was reused within weeks of the Crystal Palace concert: Sullivan's habit of leaving work until perilously late meant that he had no overture ready for the opening of his and W. S. Gilbert's comic opera The Sorcerer on 17 November, and he borrowed the Graceful Dance from the Henry VIII music, to use as a prelude until he or one of his musical assistants put a bespoke overture together, either later in the opera's first run or for its first revival, in 1884. (Note: Hughes credits Alfred Cellier with the Sorcerer overture; David Russell Hulme ascribes it to Hamilton Clarke.)

=== Water Music ===
Andante Moderato in D major, ♩.=69. In Young's view, in this movement "Sullivan’s concentration wandered and the music declines into an unmeritorious tune for solo cornet". At the time of the premiere a reviewer praised the "graceful and passionate air written for two cornets", though conceding that the technical difficulty of the first cornet part had prevented a satisfactory rendition.

== Publication and recording ==
Metzler and Company of London published the complete score in 1880.

Royston Nash conducted the Royal Philharmonic Orchestra in a Decca recording of the first and third movements in 1975. Andrew Penny conducted the complete suite for the Marco Polo label in 1992, with the RTÉ Concert Orchestra and the tenor Emmanuel Lawler (omitting the chorus parts in the second movement).

== Notes, references and sources ==
=== Sources ===
- Hughes, Gervase (1959). The Music of Sir Arthur Sullivan. London: Macmillan. OCLC 500626743.
- Jacobs, Arthur (1984). Arthur Sullivan: A Victorian Musician. Oxford and New York: Oxford University Press. ISBN 978-0-19-315443-8.
- Russell Hulme, David (2011). "Who Wrote the Overtures?". In Eden, David; Meinhard Saremba (eds.). The Cambridge Companion to Gilbert and Sullivan. Cambridge: Cambridge University Press. ISBN 978-1-13-900263-9.
- Sullivan, Arthur (1880). Incidental Music to Shakespeare's Henry VIII. London: Metzler. OCLC 52977812.
- Young, Percy M. (1971). Sir Arthur Sullivan. London: J. M. Dent & Sons. ISBN 978-0-460-03934-5.
