= The Sapphire Necklace =

Opera by Arthur Sullivan and Henry F. Chorley

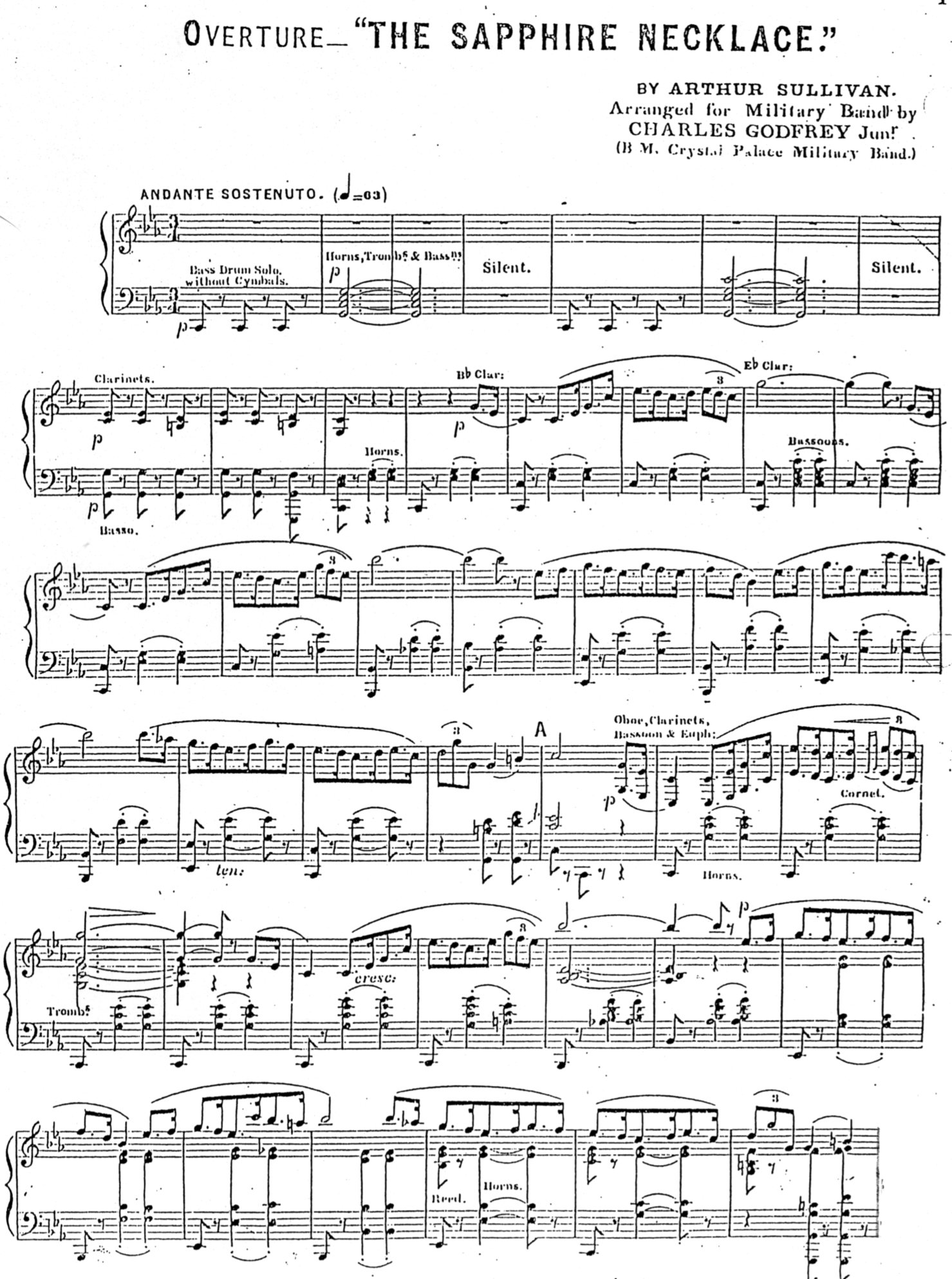
The opening of Charles Godfrey, Jr's military band arrangement of the overture.

The Sapphire Necklace, or the False Heiress (completed by 1867, and at least mostly completed by 1864), was the first opera composed by Arthur Sullivan, to a libretto by Henry F. Chorley. It was never performed, and most of the music and libretto are now lost.

== Background ==
After his incidental music to The Tempest brought Arthur Sullivan early fame in 1862, he began to experiment with a wide variety of musical compositions. By 1864, the young Sullivan had written a ballet (L'Île Enchantée), orchestral pieces including The Masque at Kenilworth, several hymns, a few piano solos, and some part songs and parlour ballads.

He had also set to work on The Sapphire Necklace. As with some of his other compositions in the 1860s, the libretto was provided by his friend Henry F. Chorley. However, this libretto proved particularly difficult to set. Later in life Sullivan would say that no other libretto had given him more difficulty, and an 1879 article suggests that he later decided to suppress the opera due to dissatisfaction with the libretto. Sullivan worked diligently at the four-act opera during 1863 and 1864, and in October 1865 the house journal of publisher Cramer & Co. advertised "A Grand Romantic Opera by A. S. Sullivan" as "ready", by contrast with operas by Balfe and Wallace described merely as "in preparation".

The Sapphire Necklace was intended to be produced by the Pyne & Harrison Opera Company, which specialised in such romantic English operas. However, the 1864–65 Pyne and Harrison season at Covent Garden proved to be the company's last, and so they never produced the opera. Sullivan found no one willing to produce The Sapphire Necklace, though the overture and selections from it were performed at The Crystal Palace and elsewhere.

== Surviving, known music and performances ==
On 13 April 1867, a selection of songs from the opera were performed at The Crystal Palace, arranged for military band by Charles Godfrey Jr. The overture proved popular and went on to appear in numerous further concerts. Like many of Sullivan's early pieces, the overture is in the style of Mendelssohn and shows that The Sapphire Necklace was a more serious work than the comic operas for which Sullivan later became famous.

The two other songs, "Over the Roof" and a now-lost recitative and prayer, "Then come not yet," were less successful. Only the former went as far as publication, and neither would appear again at a major concert in Sullivan's lifetime. The madrigal, "When Love and Beauty to Be Married Go", was saved by the Victorian love of parlour ballads, but the rest of the score other than these two songs, as well as the libretto, was lost. Sullivan sold the score to Metzler in 1878, but bought it back again in 1880. He evidently made an effort to revise the score under a new title, The False Heiress. He also mentioned, in an 1897 letter to his secretary, Wilfred Bendall, having part of the score in front of him when composing Victoria and Merrie England.

In 2000, an amateur performance of the surviving music and lyrics from the opera was given, with a new libretto by Scott Farrell, in Rockford, Illinois.

== Surviving lyrics ==
=== When Love and Beauty (madrigal) ===
(With Sullivan's repeats eliminated)

When Love and Beauty to be married go,
Pheobus, without a cloud,
Smiles on the pair.
Though rose-buds pant and blow,
The birds all sing aloud,
Tumultuous Boreas, whom the cedars bowed,
Tamed, like wane of gentle song doth flow,
Saying, till Echo doth repeat the sound,
"May all who wed in truth with happiness be crown'd."

It is not wealth and state that smooth the way,
Nor bid the desert bloom,
The ploughman at his furrow can be gay,
The weaver at his loom.
Where Honour's Lord content his wife hath room,
And hearts keep light if heads are gray,
Singing, till Echo doth repeat the sound,
"May all who wed in truth with happiness be crown'd."

=== Over the Roof ===
Over the roof and over the wall,
Grow, grow, the jessamine grow.
For ever and ever more white and tall
(No matter the dwelling be high or low!)
For yet palace be lofty and moat be wide
And mailed the bridge and lordly the towers,
There love can prevail over pomp and pride
Like the cherished beauty of those sweet flowers!
Love, love, love.
Love will not alter under the sun
While the woods grow and the waters run!

Down by the meadow, down to the sea
(Flow, flow, the river will flow)
The turf may be green, or wither'd the tree
(But the heat is the same on the cobble below.)
For whatever the season around that deep stream,
Be it snow-white winter or summer hot,
There is love, tho' a wand'rer as some might dream
Who passes and passes, yet changes not.
Ah! Love, love, love.
Love will be master under the sun
While the wood grows and the waters run!

== Recordings ==
- 1972 – Fulham Light Operatic Society recorded the two surviving vocal numbers, "When love and beauty" and "Over the roof", as bonus tracks on their world premiere recording of Sullivan's The Zoo.
- 1992 – RTÉ Concert Orchestra (Andrew Penny, conductor), recorded a reconstruction of the overture by Sullivan scholar Roderick Spencer on theMarco Polo label.
- 1993 – Gregg Smith Singers recorded "When love and beauty," a CD called Madrigals – and All That Jazz on the Newport Classic label, NPD 85524. The disc also includes a doo-wop version of the number.
- 2000 – Alderley Singers & Festival Orchestra (Peter England, conductor) recorded both of the surviving vocal numbers together with other "forgotten" items by Sullivan and Michael William Balfe.
- 2022 – BBC Concert Orchestra (John Andrews, conductor) recorded the overture for Dutton Vocalion, together with L'Île Enchantée and other Sullivan items.

In a 2022 review for MusicWeb International, Nick Barnard wrote: "Both [the 1992] version and the [2022] recording orchestrated by Robin Gordon-Powell appear to have been based on the same surviving military band arrangement made by Charles Godfrey Jr. Because of the presence of two different orchestrators the work is essentially the same-but-different across the two recordings. Penny is a few seconds longer than Andrews but again both conductors are well in tune with the style and idiom and both performances are effective and well played. [T]here are tantalising hints in some of the melodic shapes, and the overture’s final grand peroration, of the musical path Sullivan would be taking in the years ahead."
