= Chagrin (surname) =

Chagrin is a Hebrew-language surname. Notable people with the surname include:

- Francis Chagrin (1905–1972), Romanian-born British composer
- Julian Chagrin (born 1940), British-Israeli actor
- Rolanda Chagrin (born 1957), Israeli actress and comedian
