= Macbeth (Sullivan) =

Henry Irving as Macbeth

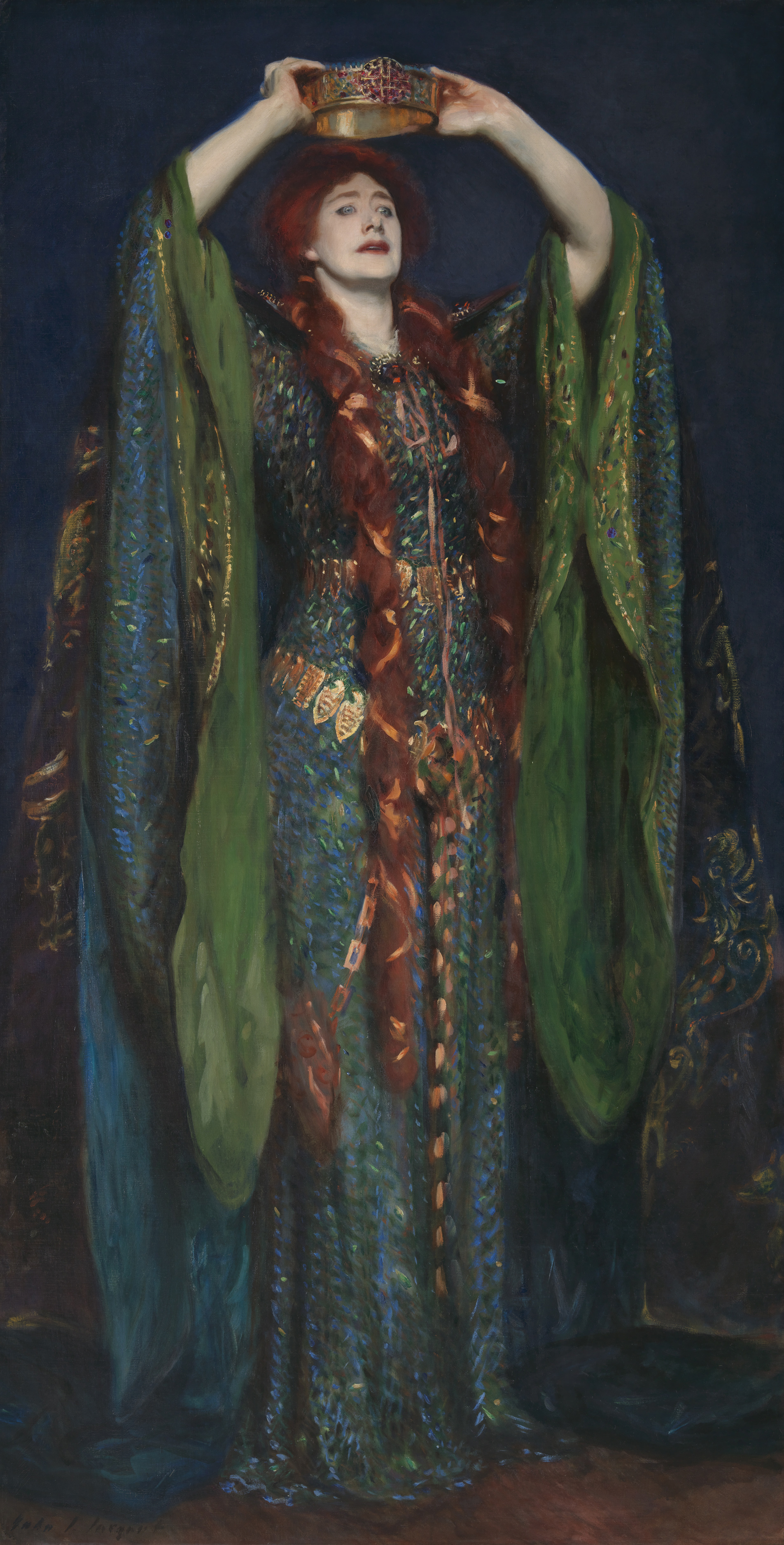
Ellen Terry as Lady Macbeth

Arthur Sullivan composed incidental music for a production of Shakespeare's Macbeth staged by Henry Irving at the Lyceum Theatre, London, in 1888. Sullivan later arranged the score into a concert suite, premiered at the Leeds Festival in 1889. The suite comprises an overture, four orchestral sections and two songs with orchestral accompaniment.

== Background ==
Sullivan had achieved his first public success in 1861 with a suite of incidental music for Shakespeare's The Tempest; ten years later, for a new production of The Merchant of Venice, he had written music that was well received in the theatre and in a subsequent concert suite. The success of that music led the impresario John Hollingshead to bring Sullivan and the librettist W. S. Gilbert together in late 1871 to write the first of what turned out to be fourteen comic operas over a twenty-five-year collaboration. Four years later Hollingshead commissioned incidental music from Sullivan for a new production of Shakespeare's The Merry Wives of Windsor. Over the next fourteen years Sullivan's theatrical compositions included eight operas with Gilbert and incidental music for Shakespeare's Henry VIII.

Henry Irving had played the title role in Shakespeare's tragedy Macbeth at the Lyceum Theatre, London, in 1875, with little success. When he returned to the piece in 1888 he gave the role greater prominence by cutting Shakespeare's text by some twenty per cent, removing several entire scenes in which Macbeth or Lady Macbeth (Ellen Terry) did not appear. He split the fifth, final act into two, believing that this would prolong tension.

The incidental music traditionally played for Macbeth was composed in the late seventeenth century and is variously attributed to Matthew Locke and Richard Leveridge; Irving did not wish to use it, and in June 1888 his company manager, Bram Stoker, called on Sullivan at the latter's flat to invite him to write the music for the forthcoming production. The composer agreed at once, and his fee was five guineas a performance. His biographer Arthur Jacobs comments, "The sum was extremely modest, but Sullivan no doubt reckoned on the ability of such music to furnish a suite for orchestral concert programmes". The resulting suite begins with a substantial overture; Sullivan's friend the critic and scholar Herman Klein, who encouraged Irving to engage Sullivan to write the suite, claimed credit for persuading Irving that the music should include one, despite Irving's feeling that overtures to tragedies had gone "out of fashion a little".

== Composition and premieres ==
Sullivan was not known for tragedy in his music and the biographer Michael Holroyd describes an incident at rehearsal when Irving found that the music Sullivan had composed did not work:

Irving insisted that it was "very fine" – but absolutely useless. Sullivan then asked for further hints, and Irving began swaying his body sideways, beating the air and making inchoate vowel sounds. "I think I understand", Sullivan said and turned back to his score. Presently the orchestra struck up some passages again and Irving cried out: "Splendid! Splendid! That's all I could have wished for".

Sullivan then completed the score within three days. (Note: Roderick Spencer and Selwyn Tillett found that Sullivan reused a movement of his 1864 ballet, L'Île Enchantée, in his incidental music to Macbeth.)

The production was premiered at the Lyceum on 29 December 1888. Sullivan conducted the orchestra – receiving an ovation – and the house was full, with an audience including Gilbert, Richard D'Oyly Carte, Charles Dickens, Arthur Wing Pinero, Fanny Ronalds, Kate Terry and Oscar Wilde. Sullivan conducted the first performance of his concert suite from the score at the Leeds Festival in October 1889.

== Score ==
According to The Daily Telegraph and The Era the theatre score comprised:

- Overture
- Act II Prelude
- Act III Prelude
- Act V Prelude
- Act VI Prelude
- Incidental passages or melodrame in Acts I, III, IV and VI.

Sullivan made a few alterations to the incidental music when arranging it into his concert suite, which comprises:

- Overture
- Andante
- Act V Prelude – Andante con espressione
- Act VI Prelude
- Act IV Introduction
- Chorus of Spirits in the Air – "Black spirits and white", Allegro vivace (Note: "Black spirits and white/Red spirits and grey/Mingle, mingle, mingle/You that mingle may!/Mingle while you may! Ah!")
- Chorus of Witches and Spirits – "Come away, come away!", Allegro vivace e con fuoco. (Note: "Come away, come away!/Hecate, Hecate, come away!/Over woods, high rocks, and mountains/Over seas, our mistress' fountains,/Over steeples, tow'rs and turrets,/We fly by night 'midst troops of spirits./Come away, come away!/No ring of bells to our ear sounds/No howl of wolves, no yelp of hounds./Come away, come away.")

Both songs were slightly abridged for the concert suite. Their text was probably not in Shakespeare's original version of the play, and they are believed to have been added for a court performance in about 1610. The first line of each of the songs is printed in the Shakespeare First Folio with no indication of the lines that follow. The rest of each of the two lyrics included by Irving and set by Sullivan is taken from the play The Witch by Shakespeare's contemporary Thomas Middleton in an edition edited by William Davenant in 1674. Irving suggested in 1889 that both lyrics may be from an earlier source, known to both Shakespeare and Middleton.

== Critical reception ==
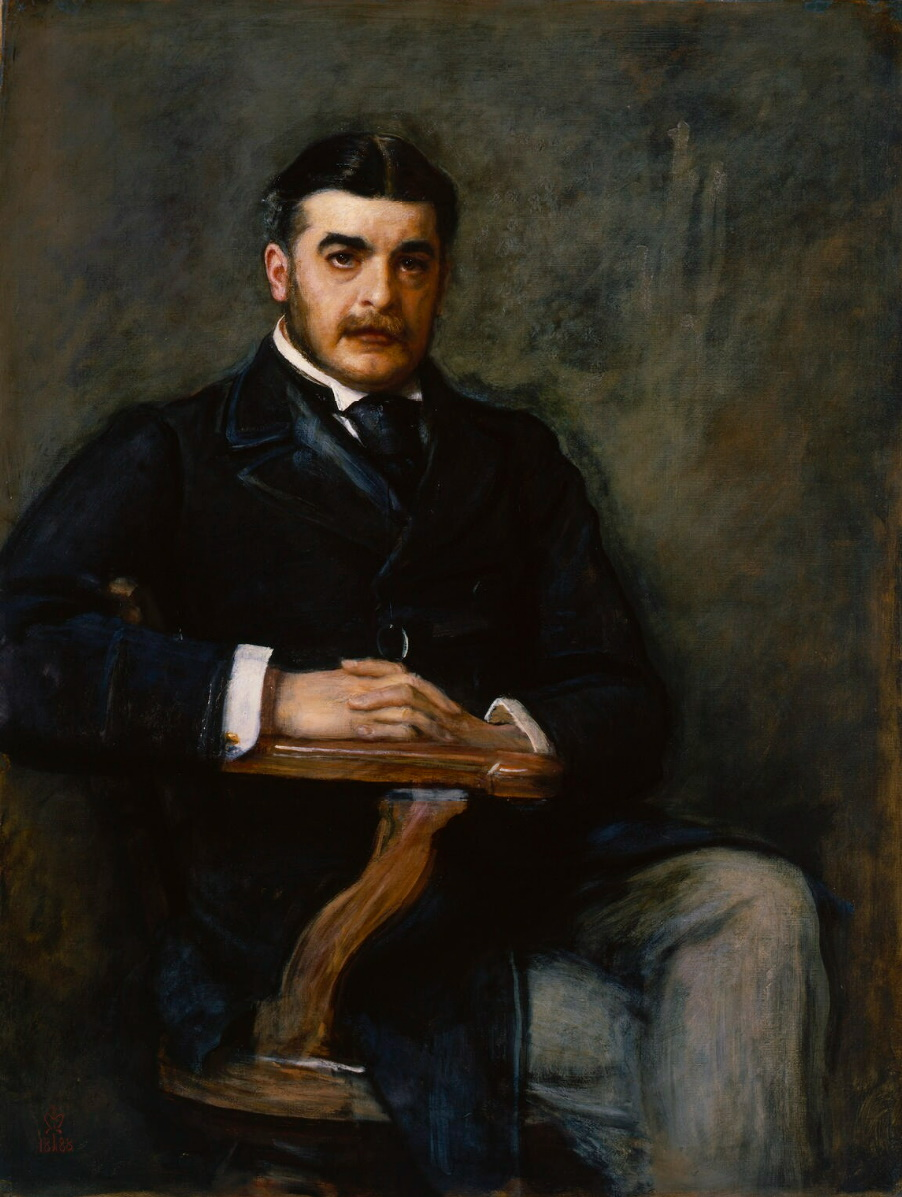
Sullivan in 1888

The Sullivan scholar Selwyn Tillett writes that the Overture "admirably depicts the pessimism and nervous tension of the whole play". It presents in succession themes suggesting "impending tragedy and a bleak landscape, a martial theme recurring throughout the first and last acts, a leitmotiv for King Duncan, a witches' Sabbath and an eerie tremolo for strings over which the flutes and first violins fly to depict Banquo's ghost in Act 2".

In The Daily Telegraph and The Era after the Lyceum premiere it was noted that Sullivan had not attempted to include Scottish local colour in his music: "There is no suggestion of the 'pipes' from beginning to end, nor do we meet with the imperfect scale upon which a good deal of typical Scottish music is founded". For Bram Stoker, "Throughout there is a barbaric ring which seems to take us back and place us amongst a warlike and undeveloped age".

According to Jacobs, the Macbeth concert suite was regarded as insubstantial and "probably seemed monotonous in key as well": he observes that the prelude to Act III in G is followed by the prelude to the Acts V and VI in G minor and G major, and then by two female choruses in D minor and D major, both in 4/4 time. In the view of another of Sullivan's biographers, Percy Young, the overture, though uneven in inspiration, has some passages with "an austerity unusual in Sullivan", and the thematic material is developed with "a tragic sense not otherwise found in his works" and in places looks forward to Jean Sibelius's music.

== Publication and recordings ==
Chappell & Co published the overture in 1888, but the rest of the music was not published until 2006, when the Amber Ring company released an edition edited by Robin Gordon Powell.

The suite was recorded in 1993 and released on CD in 1995. The RTÉ Concert Orchestra and chorus are conducted by Andrew Penny. A version of the incidental music including some spoken dialogue performed by Simon Callow was made in 2015 by the BBC Concert Orchestra and the BBC Singers, conducted by John Andrews.

The overture has been recorded by:

- The Royal Philharmonic Orchestra, conductor Royston Nash, 1974
- The Academy of St Martin in the Fields, conductor Sir Neville Marriner, 1992
- The Hanover Band, conductor Tom Higgins, 1999
- The BBC Philharmonic, conductor Sir Charles Mackerras, 2000

== Notes, references and sources ==
=== Sources ===
- Holroyd, Michael (2008). A Strange Eventful History: The Dramatic Lives of Ellen Terry, Henry Irving, and their Remarkable Families. London: Chatto and Windus. ISBN 978-0-70-117987-8.
- Irving, Henry (1889). Macbeth. London: W. S. Johnson. OCLC 1049647346.
- Jacobs, Arthur (1984). Arthur Sullivan: A Victorian Musician. Oxford and New York: Oxford University Press. ISBN 978-0-19-282033-4.
- Klein, Herman (1925). Musicians and Mummers. London: Cassell. OCLC 1573930.
- Morley, Sheridan (1986). The Great Stage Actors. London: Angus and Robertson. ISBN 978-0-207-14970-2.
- Stoker, Bram (1907). Henry Irving. London: Heinemann. OCLC 1052831972.
- Tillett, Selwyn (1995). Arthur Sullivan (1842–1900): Macbeth, King Arthur, The Merry Wives of Windsor. Hong Kong: Marco Polo. OCLC 884174715.
- Tillett, Selwyn (1998). The Ballets of Arthur Sullivan. Coventry, UK: Sir Arthur Sullivan Society.
- Young, Percy (1971). Sir Arthur Sullivan. London: J. M. Dent & Sons. ISBN 978-0-460-03934-5.
