= L'Île Enchantée =

Ballet by Arthur Sullivan

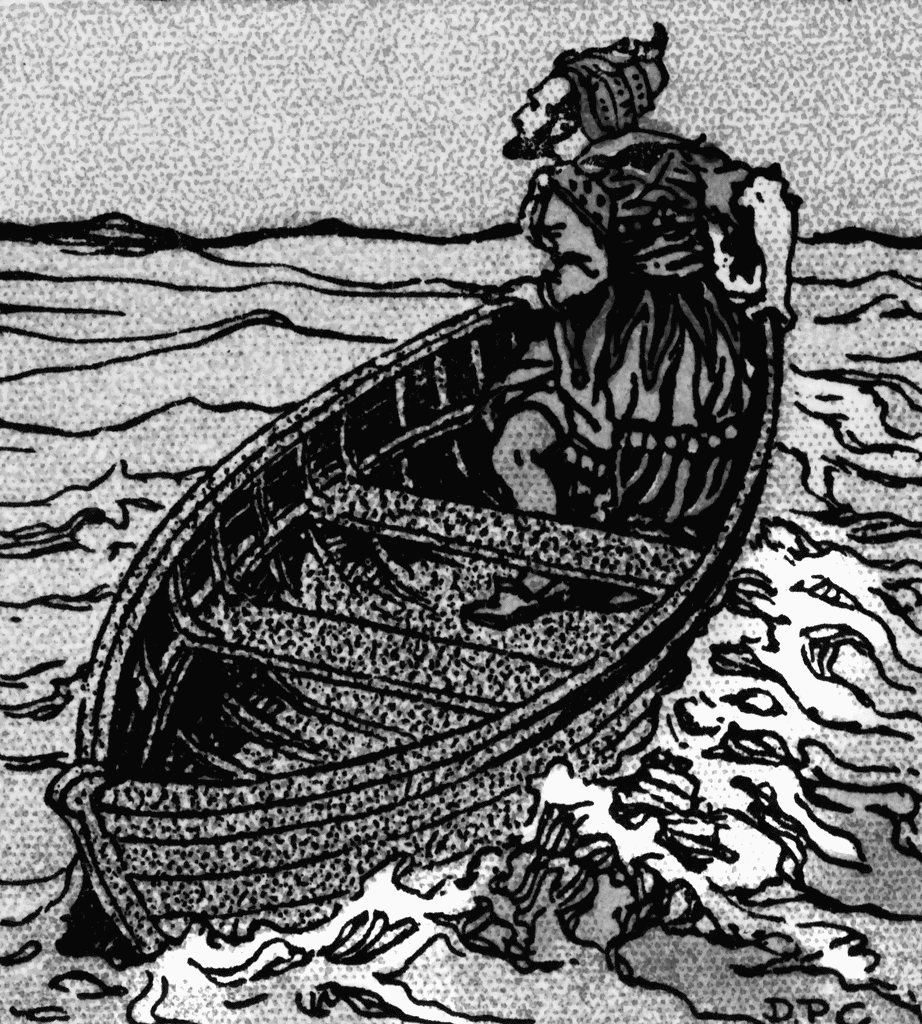
A shipwrecked mariner

L'Île Enchantée (literally, The Enchanted Island) is a ballet by Arthur Sullivan written as a divertissement at the end of Vincenzo Bellini's La Sonnambula and premiered in 1864 at Covent Garden. It was choreographed by Henri Desplaces.

== Background and history ==
In the Victorian era, it was customary for opera companies, when performing a shorter opera, to present a short ballet as an afterpiece on the programme. In 1864 Arthur Sullivan was the organist for the Royal Italian Opera at Covent Garden, precursor to the Royal Opera, under the direction of Sir Michael Costa. He had made a sensation at The Crystal Palace with his incidental music to The Tempest in 1862. The Royal Italian Opera looked to Sullivan to compose a ballet to follow its production of La sonnambula starring Adelina Patti, and so Sullivan's second major composition became L'Île Enchantée.

The ballet was first performed on 16 May 1864, just after the composer's 22nd birthday, and enjoyed 13 performances in all, also appearing after Flowtow's Stradella, Rossini's Otello, Donizetti's La Figlia del Reggimento and L'Elisir d'Amore, and Verdi's La Traviata, and it was presented in concert at The Crystal Palace in 1865. The choreographer, H. Desplaces, danced the role of the Mariner, Mdlle. Salvioni was the Queen of the Fairies, and other dancers included Mdlle. Carmine, Mdlle. Navarre, Mdlle. Assunta and Mr. W. H. Payne. The scenic designer was William Beverley.

L'Île Enchantée consists of thirteen different numbers that break down into a total of approximately 30 independent melodic sections. A review in The Orchestra dated 21 May 1864 called the music "unusually picturesque and beautiful." Sullivan's holograph full score was thought lost, although the surviving orchestra parts permitted a reconstruction of the piece in the 1980s. Since that reconstruction, Sullivan's holograph came into the collection of the curator and collector Fredric Woodbridge Wilson, who donated it to the Morgan Library & Museum, New York, in 1996, and it is now publicly available. Parts of the music in the ballet were reused in several of Sullivan's later works including his opera Thespis (1871), his incidental music to The Merchant of Venice (1871), The Merry Wives of Windsor (1874) and Macbeth (1888), and his other ballet Victoria and Merrie England (1897).

In June 1990, the Sir Arthur Sullivan Society Festival staged the first performance since 1867.

== Description of the ballet ==
On a sea-shore, satyrs enter and wake sleeping nymphs. A storm frightens the fairies away and washes on shore an exhausted shipwrecked sailor. He awakes to find himself on an island whose residents are mythical creatures. He is enchanted by The Fairy Queen, who brings him to the magical fairy bower. The sailor encounters other nymphs who test his faithfulness. After scenes of jealousy involving the characters' former lovers, the Queen of the Fairies and the sailor fall in love, leaving the jilted lovers behind. The Fairy Queen and the sailor finally kiss, transforming the Fairy Queen into a mortal, and she bestows her hand upon him.

== Musical numbers ==
- No. 1 Prelude
- No. 2 Dance of Nymphs and Satyrs - Pas de Châles
- No. 3 Galop
- No. 4 Storm - Entrance of the Gnomes - Entrance of Fairy Queen
- No. 5 Pas de deux
- No. 6 Mazurka
- No. 6a Variation
- No. 7 Scène des disparitions
- No. 8 Tempo di valse
- No. 8a Variation for Mlle. Carmine
- No. 9 Pas de trois
- No. 10 Scène de jalousie
- No. 11
- No. 12 Galop
- No. 13 Finale

== Recordings ==
The ballet was recorded in 1992 by the RTÉ Concert Orchestra, conducted by Andrew Penny, for Marco Polo. It was recorded by BBC Concert Orchestra, conducted by John Andrews, and released in 2022 by Dutton Vocalion. Nick Barnard wrote for MusicWeb International:

Penny understands the Sullivan idiom ... but this new performance edges it out. ... In the intervening years Sullivan's original score has been found allowing a couple of brief extra movements to be reinstated and generally a more critical edition of the score to be created. ... The Dutton recording is in their undemonstratively sophisticated SACD sound made in the generous acoustic of the Watford Colosseum. The playing from both orchestras is neat and nimble but the BBC players are given more of an opportunity to shine. ... Conductor John Andrews sensibly keeps the music light and the textures clean."

== Critique ==
Barnard also wrote:

[T]he music ... shows both Sullivan's strengths and limitations as a composer. L’île Enchantée was his first experience of writing a ballet. ... Part of the concept of 19th Century Grand Opera was the inclusion of a ballet. .... Given that the opera alone is a good two and a half hours, tacking fifty minutes of a new ballet on afterwards would test the concentration of any audience. The general acclaim the score received – it was performed thirteen times within the season – would indicate that the audiences [were] entertained. ...

The orchestrations are always effective, the melodic flow attractive and indeed often memorable. ... What it lacks – and what it did not really need in its original context – is emotional and dramatic weight. This is just what it says on the tin – a divertissement. [T]he music has little if any dramatic context – there is a storm sequence and a Scène de jalousie but otherwise this is simply a vehicle to display the dancing talents of the performers. ... Mendelssohn is the predominant influence. Intriguingly there are little glimpses in the galops especially of the kind of nimble patter songs that would be such a key part of the Gilbert & Sullivan legacy. The music is always fluent, certainly enjoyable, skillfully and aptly written in a way that few if any of Sullivan's British contemporaries could match. But ... [a]way from the [Gilbert and Sullivan] operettas that have ensured his enduring fame Sullivan was rather too content to write in styles and genres that supported rather than challenged convention.

A review in The Orchestra shortly after the premiere was glowing in its praise, calling the music, by turns, "sparkling", "unusually picturesque and beautiful", "charmingly appropriate", and "bright and spirited". Of the love scene between the shipwrecked mariner and The Queen of the Fairies (No. 5), the reviewer comments: "The descriptive force of the music which accompanies this scene is especially remarkable."
