= Francis Chagrin =

Romanian English composer (1905–1972)

- Born: Alexander Paucker; November 15, 1905; Bucharest, Romania
- Died: November 10, 1972 (aged 66); Hampstead, London, England
- Occupation: Composer

Francis Chagrin (born Alexander Paucker, 15 November 1905 – 10 November 1972), was a composer of film scores and popular orchestral music, as well as a conductor. He was also the "organizer and chief moving spirit" who founded the Society for the Promotion of New Music.

== Career ==
He was born in Bucharest, Romania to Jewish parents and at their insistence studied for an engineering degree in Zurich while secretly studying at that city's music conservatoire. He graduated in 1928 but when his family failed to support his musical ambitions, left home and moved to Paris where he adopted his new, French-sounding name.

By playing in nightclubs and cafes as a pianist and writing popular songs, he funded himself for two years, from 1933, at the Ecole Normale, where his teachers included Paul Dukas and Nadia Boulanger, and settled in England in 1936.

At the outbreak of World War II, he was appointed musical adviser and composer-in-chief to the BBC French Service and the programme Les Français parlent aux Français. For this, he was decorated Officier d'Academie by the French government in 1948. He spoke French fluently, as well as perfect English (with a French accent), Romanian and German, and good Italian and Spanish. For a trip to the USSR in October 1966, he studied Russian.

In January 1943 Chagrin founded The Committee for the Promotion of New Music (later renamed Society for the Promotion of New Music) with the intention of promoting the creation, performance and appreciation of new music by young and unestablished composers. Ralph Vaughan Williams agreed to be its president, with Arthur Bliss the committee's vice-president. In his obituary of Chagrin, fellow composer Benjamin Frankel said that through the Society Chagrin "gave many composers (not only the young ones) their first opportunity of a hearing: he had travelled abroad as our representative, had battled with publishers and spoken passionately on the question of performing rights. He had, in fact, become the first person to whom we turned when composer's problems arose".

In 1951 Chagrin formed his own chamber group, the Francis Chagrin Ensemble which performed and broadcast regularly over the next two decades, including many first performances.

== Family ==
Chagrin married his second wife Eileen during the Second World War and they lived in London, at 48 Fellows Road, Hampstead. His sons are the actors Nicolas and Julian Chagrin, husband of actress and comedian Rolanda Chagrin. There was also a stepson, the poet Gerald Benson. Chagrin died in Hampstead after several heart attacks. The Francis Chagrin Fund for Young Composers was established in his memory in 1973 and continues today.

== Music ==
Chagrin's compositions include orchestral concert works, light music, chamber music and over 200 film scores, television and commercials. His Prelude and Fugue for orchestra was given its world premiere at The Proms in 1947 by the London Philharmonic Orchestra, conducted by Basil Cameron. He composed the score for the 1955 film about Colditz, The Colditz Story. His harmonica work Roumanian Fantasy was composed in 1956 for Larry Adler. In 1959 he composed the theme and incidental music for the Sapphire Films TV series The Four Just Men for ITV. In 1963, he won the Harriet Cohen International Music Award as "film composer of the year". The following year, he composed music for the Doctor Who television episodes The Dalek Invasion of Earth.

He left a third symphony incomplete at his death. Chagrin had also been commissioned to write a new piece for performance at the SPNM's 30th-anniversary concert at the Queen Elizabeth Hall on 5 February 1973 - one of the few times his own work was ever performed at an SPNM event - but was unable to complete the work. At his request, the Lamento appassionato for string orchestra was played instead.

=== Concert music ===
Including:

- Prelude and Fugue for Orchestra (1947)
- Piano Concerto (1943, rev. 1969, 1971)
- Prelude and Fugue for Two Violins (1950)
- Aquarelles (Portraits of Five Children) for strings (1951)
- Helter Skelter overture (1951)
- Lamento appassionato for strings (1951)
- Sarabande for oboe and strings (1951)
- Divertimento for wind quintet (1952)
- Roumanian Fantasy for harmonica and orchestra (1956)
- Symphony No 1 (1946–59, rev 1965)
- Sept Petite Pieces pour 8 Instruments (1966)
- Symphony No 2 (1965–71)
- Castellana, Spanish dance for orchestra (1968)
- Divertimento for brass quintet (1969)
- Renaissance Suite for strings, optional wind (1969)

=== Film scores ===
- The Silent Battle (1939)
- Behind the Guns (1940)
- Law and Disorder (1940)
- Helter Skelter (1949)
- Last Holiday (1950)
- The Happy Family (1952)
- Castle in the Air (1952)
- The Intruder (1953)
- An Inspector Calls (1954)
- The Beachcomber (1954)
- The Colditz Story (1955)
- Simba (1955)
- Charley Moon (1956)
- No Time for Tears (1957)
- The Scamp (1957)
- The Snorkel (1958)
- Danger Within (1959)
- Marriage of Convenience (1960)
- Clue of the Twisted Candle (1960) - ( an episode of ' The Edgar Wallace Mysteries ')
- Greyfriars Bobby (1961)
- In the Cool of the Day (1963)
