= Chagrin =

Chagrin may refer to:

- Shagreen or chagrin, a type of rawhide consisting of rough untanned skin
- Chagrin (surname), a Hebrew-language surname
- Chagrin River, a tributary of Lake Erie
- Chagrin (comic book), a 2026 comic book by Rodolphe and Griffo

== See also ==
- Chagrin Falls, Ohio
