= The Tempest (Sullivan) =

Suite of incidental music for Shakespeare's play composed by Arthur Sullivan

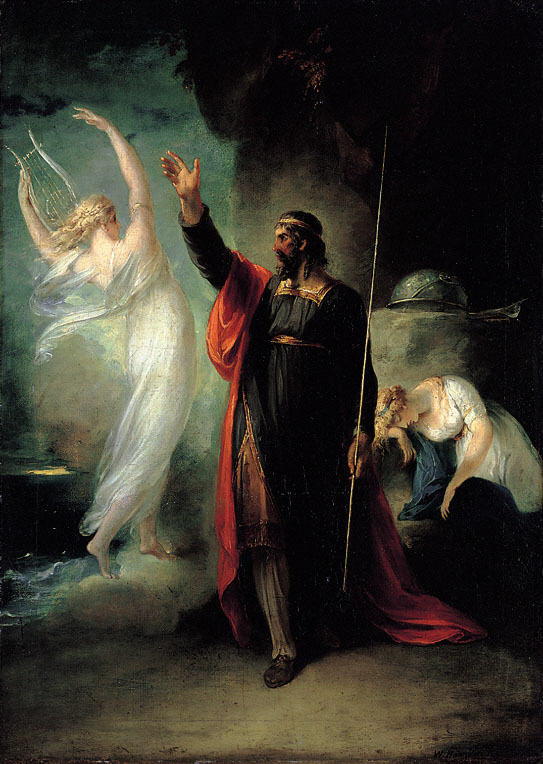
Prospero and Ariel from a painting by William Hamilton

The Tempest incidental music, Op. 1, is a set of movements for Shakespeare's play composed by Arthur Sullivan in 1861 and expanded in 1862. This was Sullivan's first major composition, and its success quickly brought him to the attention of the musical establishment in England.

== Background and first performances ==
Sullivan wrote his incidental music to Shakespeare's play as his graduation piece while a conservatory student at Leipzig. Felix Mendelssohn was much admired by the tutors at the Leipzig Conservatory, and Sullivan's music, following the pattern of Mendelssohn's famous score for A Midsummer Night's Dream, was chosen for inclusion in the Conservatory’s end-of-year concert at the Leipzig Gewandhaus on 6 April 1861, while Sullivan was still eighteen years old. At that concert, six items from the score were played, conducted by the composer: "Introduction", "Ariel’s Song", "Entr’acte", "Grotesque Dance", "Entr’acte and Epilogue", "Dance of Nymphs and Reapers".

After Sullivan's return to England, early in 1862 the music critic Henry F. Chorley hosted a private performance of The Tempest in his home, where George Grove, at that time Secretary to the Crystal Palace, heard the piece. Grove was sufficiently impressed to arrange for a performance of the work by the unknown composer at the Crystal Palace, where it was taken up by August Manns, conductor of the Crystal Palace concerts.

Sullivan revised and extended the music to twelve movements, which were given in full at a concert on 5 April 1862 at the Crystal Palace, with a linking narration written by Chorley and spoken by Arthur Matthison. The solo singers were May Banks and Robertina Henderson. The work was an immediate success, with five numbers being encored. The score was favourably reviewed by The Times and even more favourably by The Athenaeum, which was the publication for which Chorley was critic. So great was the success of the concert that it was repeated the following week, and Sullivan's reputation as an extremely promising composer was made overnight.

== Musical analysis and subsequent performances ==
As might be expected in the work of such a young composer, the influence of earlier composers is marked. Gervase Hughes detects the influence of Beethoven in the Introduction, Schumann in the Act IV Overture. Percy Young suggests Liszt (an acquaintance of Sullivan's) and Berlioz as influences. Hughes, Young and Arthur Jacobs agree that the most conspicuous influence is Mendelssohn.

In early 1863, Charles Hallé included the work in two concerts with his Manchester orchestra, which also included Mendelssohn's A Midsummer Night's Dream music, where Sullivan's piece was received enthusiastically. The Manchester Guardian was strong in its praise for Sullivan's work. In October 1864 it was used in a production of the play at the Prince's Theatre in Manchester. In the nineteenth and early twentieth centuries, Mendelssohn's music for A Midsummer Night’s Dream was regularly used in theatrical productions. The same is not true of Sullivan's The Tempest music, although he later was commissioned to write incidental music for productions of other Shakespeare plays staged by Henry Irving and others.

In his review of the 2008 recording by the Kansas City Symphony, Rob Barnett writes, "This music is smooth, full of lissom invention and generally in the style of Schumann and Mendelssohn ... Truly charming is the skipping flute figuration in 'Banquet Dance'. The orchestra is just as successful in the ... 'Dance of Nymphs and Reapers'. Mendelssohn is certainly engaged in the Act IV overture. The Act V Prelude with its shivering-plodding string pizzicato and epic lassitude is another magnificent effort."

== Musical numbers ==
- Introduction

Act I

- Song: Come unto these yellow sands (Ariel to Ferdinand)
- Song: Full fathom five thy father lies (Ariel to Ferdinand)

Act II

- Ariel's Music
- Melodrama and Song: While you here do snoring lie (Ariel to Gonzalo)

Act III

- Prelude
- Banquet Dance

Act IV

- Overture
- Masque of Iris, Ceres, Juno
- Duet: Honour, riches, marriage blessings (Juno and Ceres to Ferdinand and Miranda)
- Dance of nymphs and reapers

Act V

- Prelude
- Song: Where the bee sucks (Ariel to Prospero)
- Epilogue

== Recordings ==
The full score of The Tempest (except for a few passages surrounding the dialogue) was first recorded in 1955 by the Vienna Orchestral Society conducted by F. Charles Adler, better known for his performances of the works of Bruckner and Mahler. The recording was well regarded and was reissued on CD in 1999 on the "Sounds on CD" label. A suite comprising about half the music was recorded in 1972 by the City of Birmingham Symphony Orchestra, conducted by Sir Vivian Dunn, and in 2000, by the BBC Philharmonic Orchestra, conducted by Richard Hickox. In 2008, a recording of most of the music was issued by the Kansas City Symphony, with Michael Stern conducting, on the Reference Recordings label (RR-115CD). Rob Barnett calls the recording excellent, but Marc Shepherd judges it "not as good as the 1955 reading [but] nevertheless enjoyable".

A complete recording was issued in 2016 on the Dutton Epoch label, together with Sullivan's incidental music for Macbeth and his "Marmion Overture". Soloists are the sopranos Mary Bevan and Fflur Wyn, with Simon Callow speaking some of Shakespeare's dialogue surrounding the music, and the BBC Singers and BBC Concert Orchestra. The conductor is John Andrews.

== See also ==
- The Merchant of Venice incidental music (1871)
- Macbeth incidental music (1888)

== Sources ==
- Hughes, Gervase (1959). The Music of Sir Arthur Sullivan. London: Macmillan. OCLC 500626743.
- Jacobs, Arthur (1984). Arthur Sullivan: A Victorian Musician. Oxford and New York: Oxford University Press. ISBN 978-0-19-315443-8.
- Rowse, A. L., ed. (1978). The Annotated Shakespeare. London: Orbis. ISBN 0-85613-073-7.
- Young, Percy M. (1971). Sir Arthur Sullivan. London: J. M. Dent & Sons. ISBN 978-0-460-03934-5.
- Young, Percy M. (1972). Notes to EMI recording CSD 3713. London: EMI. OCLC 642606288.
