= Cape Cod Symphony Orchestra =

Cape Symphony
- Orchestra
- Founded: 1962
- Location: Barnstable, Massachusetts
- Website: www.capesymphony.org

Cape Symphony, located on Cape Cod, is one of the largest professional orchestras in Massachusetts.

== About Cape Symphony ==
Cape Symphony's concert season includes five Masterpiece (classical) and four CapePOPS! performances, plus special events, all held in the 1,400-seat Barnstable Performing Arts Center in Hyannis, MA. During the summer, the orchestra performs for residents and vacationers at outdoor events, including the annual Symphony at the Seashore concert at the Cape Cod National Seashore's Salt Pond Visitors Center in Eastham, MA.

Cape Symphony is currently conducting a search for its next music director.

Cape Symphony is supported by trustees and staff, sponsors and supporters, and volunteers.

== Music Directors ==
- 2025-Present Alyssa Wang
- 2007–2023 Jung-Ho Pak
- 1980-2007 Royston Nash
- 1970-1980 Jerry Cohen
- 1969-1970 Osborne McConathy
- 1968-1969 Kalman Novak
- 1962-1967 Jennings Butterfield
