= Andrew Penny =

English conductor

Andrew Jonathan Penny MBE (born 4 December 1952, Kingston upon Hull, East Riding of Yorkshire, England) is an English conductor. He has recorded a complete cycle of Malcolm Arnold's symphonies. He has conducted a series of recordings of Arthur Sullivan's ballets and incidental music released on the Marco Polo label. Some have been reissued on the Naxos label. They include The Merchant of Venice, The Merry Wives of Windsor, Henry VIII and Macbeth. From 1982 to 2022, he was musical director of the Hull Philharmonic Orchestra. In November 1999 he directed two performances of Gustav Mahler's Symphony No. 8 (The Symphony of a Thousand), as part of the Millennium celebrations in Hull.

He was appointed Member of the Order of the British Empire (MBE) in the 2014 Birthday Honours for services to music.

He worked at Hymers College between 1977 and 2022 in the Music Department as Head of Woodwind, Head of Instrumental and Vocal Staff and a Teacher of Clarinet and Saxophone.
