= Royston Nash =

English conductor (1933–2016)

Royston Nash in later years

Royston Hulbert Nash (23 July 1933 – 4 April 2016) was an English conductor, best known as a music director of the D'Oyly Carte Opera Company and, later, as the conductor of the Cape Cod Symphony Orchestra.

His career as a conductor began with the Royal Marines from 1957 to 1970. He then joined D'Oyly Carte, becoming music director from 1971 to 1979. He led the company during its centenary year in 1975 and issued a number of recordings, including the company's only recordings of Utopia, Limited, The Grand Duke, and The Zoo, as well as recordings of some rarely heard Sullivan music. He then moved to the United States, where he became musical director of the Cape Cod Symphony Orchestra, the Nashua Symphony Orchestra, and other ensembles, until his retirement in 2007. He also founded and conducted Symphony by the Sea.

== Early life and career ==
Nash was born in Southampton, the son of Ellen (née Hulbert, 1899–1982) and Sydney Price Nash (1898–1976), and grew up in Bournemouth after the family moved there in 1942 to avoid bombing in Southampton. He began to study the trumpet at age seven. At the age of sixteen, he joined the Royal Marines School of Music, remaining there for six years and receiving a Licentiate of the Royal Academy of Music in conducting. He then studied the trumpet under George Eskdale for a year at the Royal Academy of Music, where he was awarded the Certificate of Merit for Conducting in 1957. and graduated in 1958. He also held the Bronze Medal of the Worshipful Company of Musicians. His mentors included Rudolf Kempe, Constantin Silvestri and Sir Malcolm Sargent.

After this training, in 1960, he was appointed Bandmaster with the Royal Marines, where he served for three years as director of music to the Commander-in-Chief, Mediterranean, and also conducting the Malta Choral Society. He also served in the Far East. He was then director of music to the Commander-in-Chief, Portsmouth at the Naval Home Command. Then, with the rank of captain, he was appointed director of music at the Royal Marines School of Music in Deal, Kent, where he finished his 10-year commission. He conducted a section of the Royal Marines Band at Sadler's Wells Theatre during a first-act performance of H.M.S. Pinafore at the last night of the London Season of the D'Oyly Carte Opera Company in March 1970.

== D'Oyly Carte Opera Company ==
In September 1970, Nash joined the D'Oyly Carte company as assistant musical director to James Walker, whom he succeeded as musical director in March 1971. Nash continued with the company until April 1979. He was in charge of the centenary season at the Savoy Theatre in 1975, where all the Gilbert and Sullivan operas from Trial by Jury to The Grand Duke were presented in chronological order. Nash was joined by guest conductors Isidore Godfrey (for H.M.S. Pinafore) and Sir Charles Mackerras (The Pirates of Penzance and The Mikado). He led two American tours by the company, including the one in 1976. In 1977, during Queen Elizabeth II's Jubilee Year, the company gave a Royal Command Performance at Windsor Castle, conducted by Nash.

== Later years ==
Nash moved to North America in 1979, and in 1980 he became musical director of both the Nashua Symphony Orchestra in Nashua, New Hampshire, ending with the 2006–2007 season, and of the Cape Cod Symphony Orchestra in Massachusetts for 27 years until 2007, where he was then music director laureate for life. He extended the orchestra's repertory to include Elgar (notably a 2002 performance of The Dream of Gerontius with the Royal Choral Society), Mahler and Shostakovich, among others, and is credited with transforming it from an amateur ensemble to a professional orchestra. He was also the founder and, until 1995, music director and conductor of Symphony by the Sea in Marblehead, Massachusetts; music director and conductor of the Cape Ann Symphony Orchestra from 1980 until 1986; and was a conductor at the Boston Conservatory of Music in 1985 and 1986. He lived in Cotuit, Massachusetts, which he had first visited while on tour with D'Oyly Carte. Nash married Lois Barry (born 1942) in Barnstable, Massachusetts, on 30 June 1991. He had two sons, Adrian Wesley (1953–1993) and Kelvin Howard Nash (born 1960), from his first marriage to Joyce Gladys (née Murdoch) in 1952.

The Telegraph called Nash "a charismatic and engaging figure." He died in 2016 at the age of 82 at the McCarthy Care Center in East Sandwich, Massachusetts.

== Recordings ==
With D'Oyly Carte, Nash conducted a filmed performance of H.M.S. Pinafore in 1973 and Decca recordings of The Mikado (1973), Iolanthe (1974), Trial by Jury (1975), Utopia, Limited (1976), The Grand Duke (1976), The Gondoliers (1977), Cox and Box, the world premiere professional recording of The Zoo (1978), and The Yeomen of the Guard (1979). The Royal Philharmonic Orchestra was engaged for all these recordings, and Nash and the company took the opportunity to record some of Sullivan's non-Savoy music as fillers in these recordings, for example: the Macbeth Overture and two excerpts from the Henry VIII music with Trial by Jury, a cut version of the Marmion Overture with The Gondoliers, the "Imperial March" (instead of the Utopia, Limited overture) and the Ballet Suite No 1 from Victoria and Merrie England with Yeomen.
