= Hull Philharmonic Orchestra =

English amateur orchestra

The Hull Philharmonic Orchestra (colloquially known as The Hull Phil) is an amateur orchestra based in Kingston upon Hull, one of the UK’s oldest amateur ensembles. Andrew Penny was its musical director and conductor for forty years, from 1982 until his retirement in 2022. Simon Chalk is his successor. Dr. Elaine King is Assistant Musical Director.

== History ==
The orchestra was founded in 1881 as the Hull Philharmonic Society, including 27 players, a committee and local patrons. Its first concert took place at the Public Assembly Rooms, Jarratt Street in Hull on 19 April 1882. The concert included specially composed overtures by both Henri Hartog, the orchestra's first conductor and musical director, and John William Hudson (1856-1923), its second conductor, who took over the baton in 1891.

In 1923 Henry Wood accepted the conductorship of the orchestra, travelling three times a year to rehearse and conduct its concerts. He conducted 48 concerts in all, concluding on 13 April 1939 with performances of Brahm's First Symphony and Mozart's E flat Concerto for two pianos, played by Ethel Bartlett and Rae Robertson.

Following Wood, the orchestra continued to appoint or invite as guests high profile conductors. These included: Basil Cameron, Albert Coates, Clarence Raybould, Herbert Menges, Vilem Tausky, Norman del Mar, Walter Goehr, Walter Susskind, John Hollingsworth, Lawrence Leonard, Sir Charles Groves, George Weldon, Richard Austin, Terence Lovett, Henry Walford Davies, David Haslem, Antony Hopkins, Brian Stait, Nicholas Smith, Richard Hickox, Meredith Davies, Maurice Handford, Andrew Penny and David Lloyd-Jones.

== Special occasions and commissions ==
Vilém Tauský conducted the specially commissioned Symphony No. 1 by John Joubert for the orchestra's seventy-fifth anniversary concert in 1956. On 25 November 1971 the orchestra performed the Fifth Symphony by Wilfred Josephs to mark the Society's ninetieth anniversary. For the Centenary celebrations (1981-1982 season) the orchestra commissioned the Sinfonia Concertante, op.82 by local composer Anthony Hedges. It was performed on 27 February 1982 with Terence Lovett conducting. In November 1999 the orchestra (conducted by Andrew Penny) put on two performances of Mahler's Symphony of a Thousand with a supplemented orchestra, soloist and massed local choirs.
