= The Merchant of Venice (Sullivan) =

Sullivan, c. 1870

Charles Calvert, who commissioned the music

Arthur Sullivan composed his suite of incidental music, The Merchant of Venice, in 1871 for a production of Shakespeare's play. It is in seven movements. There is one movement in which the orchestra is joined by a solo singer: the words are not by Shakespeare, but by the 19th-century poet Franceso Rizzelli. The success of this theatre music by Sullivan led within weeks to the beginning of his twenty-five-year collaboration with the librettist W. S. Gilbert.

== History ==
Sullivan had achieved his first public success in 1861 with a suite of incidental music for Shakespeare's The Tempest. After being played in Leipzig and London, that music was twice given in Manchester by Charles Hallé and his orchestra, and in 1864 the actor-manager Charles Calvert staged the play with Sullivan's music at the new Prince's Theatre, Manchester. In 1871 Calvert planned a new production of The Merchant of Venice at the same theatre and invited Sullivan to compose music for the masque. This, at the end of the first act, is a colourful scene of revelry under cover of which Shylock's daughter, Jessica, elopes from his house with her lover and her father's ducats.

At the first night of the production, on 19 September 1871, Sullivan conducted the music for the masque. The suite was given in concert at the Crystal Palace, London, the following month, conducted by August Manns with Juliette Conneau as the soloist in the one vocal number, the Barcarole. Sullivan later conducted the suite in France and the US. The success of the music led the London impresario John Hollingshead to invite the composer to collaborate with W. S. Gilbert: their first collaboration, Thespis, opened at the end of 1871.

== Music ==
The suite is in seven sections:

1. Introduction 4/4 Allegro moderato, ♩=120.
2. Barcarole (Serénade) 6/8 Andante con moto, ♪=144.
3. Introduction and Bourrée 2/4 Allegro con brio, ♩=112.
4. Danse grotesque (Pierrots and Harlequins) 2/4 no metronome mark.
5. À la valse 3/4 Tempo di Valse, Molto moderato.
6. Melodrama 3/4 L'istesso tempo
7. Finale 2/4 Allegro vivace, ♩=144.

Sullivan's friend George Grove wrote this description of the suite for its Crystal Palace performance:

At the commencement of the scene, when the music begins, the stage is empty and night is approaching. The distant cry of the gondoliers echoing along the canals, and the voices of the masquers as they approach nearer and nearer are all depicted in the music. A lover serenades his mistress, the masquers gradually throng the ground, and the revelry begins. The dances are first a Bourrée, the old-fashioned heavy measure, next a grotesque dance for Pierrots and Harlequins, and thirdly a general dance in modern waltz rhythm. Night has settled down on the scene when Jessica makes her escape; after this the fun waxes furious, and midst the glare of torches, the glitter of coloured lanterns, and the shouts and songs of the revellers, the curtain descends.

A twentieth-century analyst, Percy Young, called the introduction "an essay exploring the musical potentialities of the interval of a fourth", which Sullivan derived from the cry of the gondoliers on the canals. For Young, the bourrée further explores the principal motiv from the Introduction "now in combination with baroque figuration portending Parry – a highly formalised piece ... given an extra imaginative dimension through unexpected tonalities". Both Young and the Sullivan scholar Gervase Hughes heard echoes of Sullivan's earlier Overture di Ballo in the Waltz. The Finale is based on a G minor-major axis; Young calls it "a finely-wrought essay within earshot of the baroque". In its recapitulation the theme of the Introduction to the suite recurs.

The suite is scored for 2 flutes (2nd doubling piccolo), 2 oboes, 2 clarinets, 2 bassoons; 4 horns, 2 cornets, 3 trombones; timpani, triangle, snare drum, bass drum, cymbals and strings.

== Reception ==
The music had a favourable reception. The Times called it "spirited, charming, and full of character. … There are in all six numbers, so carefully knit together that they may be regarded as one homogeneous and well-considered whole". The paper singled out for praise the one vocal number, Nel ciel seren (Bright above the lagoon), "the words for which, by Signor F. Rizzelli have inspired Mr Sullivan with one of the most graceful melodies that ever came from his pen". The Illustrated London News thought the music more suited to its intended theatrical use than to concert hall performance, but found the score "capitally scored for the orchestra and full of liveliness and animation". A Manchester paper praised "the rollicking sort of hide-and-seek horse-play of a band of masked revellers, wonderfully shown by the odd bits of quaint notes dodging one after another all over the orchestra from unusual instruments".

== Publication ==
The orchestral score was published by Bosworth and Company, Leipzig, in 1898.

== Recordings ==
Sir Vivian Dunn conducted the City of Birmingham Symphony Orchestra in a 1972 recording of the orchestral numbers of the suite for EMI. A complete recording was made for the Marco Polo label in 1992 and subsequently re-released on the Naxos label; Andrew Penny conducted the RTÉ Concert Orchestra. The soloist in the Barcarole was Emmanuel Lawler.

== Sources ==
- Allen, Reginald (1975). Sir Arthur Sullivan – Composer and Personage. New York: Pierpont Morgan Library. OCLC 642398593.
- Hughes, Gervase (1959). The Music of Sir Arthur Sullivan. London: Macmillan. OCLC 500626743.
- Jacobs, Arthur (1984). Arthur Sullivan: A Victorian Musician. Oxford and New York: Oxford University Press. ISBN 978-0-19-315443-8.
- Sullivan, Arthur (1898). Mascarade du Marchand de Venise (PDF). Leipzig: Bosworth. OCLC 926792251.
- Young, Percy M. (1971). Sir Arthur Sullivan. London: J. M. Dent & Sons. ISBN 978-0-460-03934-5.
