= Victoria and Merrie England =

Ballet by Arthur Sullivan and Carlo Coppi

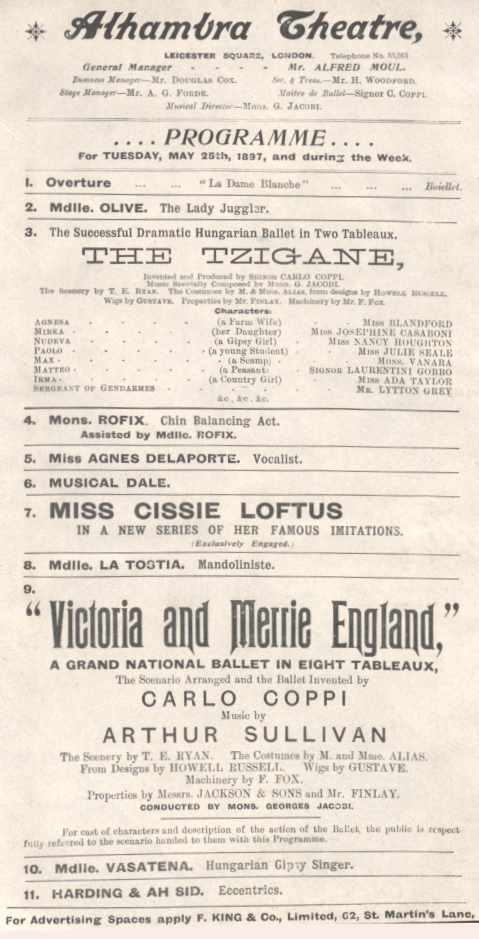
Programme from the ballet, 1897

Victoria and Merrie England, billed as a "Grand National Ballet in Eight Tableaux" is a ballet by the choreographer Carlo Coppi with music by Arthur Sullivan, written to commemorate the 1897 Diamond Jubilee of Queen Victoria, commemorating her sixty years on the throne. The action of the piece consists of a series of seven historical vignettes in praise of Britain, and the score is a pot-pourri of characteristically English music.

The ballet opened in May 1897 at the Alhambra Theatre and became very popular, earning positive critical reviews and running for nearly six months. It did not, however, become part of the standard ballet repertoire. Although Sullivan's autograph manuscript does not survive, the ballet has been reconstructed from various early sources and has been recorded.

== Background ==
In honour of the Jubilee, Alfred Moul, manager of the Alhambra Theatre, asked Sullivan to compose a patriotic ballet to a scenario by the theatre's resident choreographer, Coppi. As the nation's pre-eminent composer, Sullivan was the natural choice to write the music. An alternative Jubilee composition, a poem submitted to Sullivan by the Poet Laureate, Alfred Austin, was never set.

Sullivan composed the piece mostly on the French Riviera, combining the task with visits to the casino. He told a reporter:

I don't think I quite realised what I was doing when I promised Mr Alfred Moul a Jubilee ballet for the Alhambra. ... There is almost as much work here as in two Savoy operas. In ballet, you see, the composer has no lyrics to help him, nothing to suggest a measure or a rhythm. He must cudgel his own brains for every beat and every bar, and realise at the same time that he will have no voices to help him out. That is what I have been doing in the Riviera".

He produced one of his few successes in the decade of the 1890s. Victoria and Merrie England opened on 25 May 1897 and ran for six months at the Alhambra, which was a generous run for this kind of piece. Members of the British royal family were reported to have attended at least nineteen times. The orchestra was under the direction of the Alhambra's resident conductor Georges Jacobi.

== Description ==
Although Sullivan's autograph manuscript does not survive, Roderick Spencer of the Sir Arthur Sullivan Society reconstructed the score from several sources, including earlier scores from which Sullivan drew, the piano reduction, and other clues that he gleaned from letters and news reports. Sullivan extracted three orchestral suites from the ballet, but only one of these survives. Sullivan's assistant, Wilfred Bendall, prepared the published piano reduction of the ballet.

The ballet consists of a series of seven historical vignettes in praise of Britain, such as "Ancient Britain," Christmas in the time of Charles II, and two scenes devoted to Queen Victoria. The score is a pot-pourri of characteristically English music. The staging too, was essentially British: the Sullivan scholar Selwyn Tillett writes of the Alhambra ballets that they had "little to do with the mainstream of classical ballet as it is understood today. Neither Swan Lake nor Sylvia was seen in London complete until the Dyagilev tour of 1911–12 ... cut off from the classical source, Alhambra ballet had developed in a unique direction of its own." Tillett describes the Alhambra ballets as "mime-dramas" with many individual scenes and "speciality" dances. The work did not become part of the standard ballet repertoire. In the score, Sullivan reused material from his Imperial March (1893) and his only other ballet, L'Ile Enchantée (1864). (Note: Tillett and Spencer found that Sullivan reused music from L'Île Enchantée in Victoria and Merrie England and other works.) The final scene, after a depiction of Victoria's coronation, ends in a contemporary dance for soldiers from the various parts of Great Britain and its colonies and includes a counterpoint of characteristic tunes representing England, Scotland and Ireland, among which is Sullivan's own mock-patriotic "He is an Englishman", from H.M.S. Pinafore.

== Summary of scenes ==
Scene I: Ancient Britain

Scene II: May Day in Queen Elizabeth's time

- Scene I – Ancient Britain
  - An oak forest, night – Britannia asleep – Britain's Guardian Spirit – Sacred March of the Druids – Rites of the Mistletoe – Britannia awakes.

In an oak forest in the era of the Druids, Britannia is seen sleeping. She is greeted by "England's Guardian Genius". A procession of Druids and Priestesses arrive, and various Druidical rites and sacred dances ensue. Noticing Britannia sleeping, the High Priest prophesies her future greatness, and everyone kneels to her.

- Scenes II & III – May Day in Queen Elizabeth's Time
  - Village green – young heir comes of age. Procession of mummers and revellers – Historical Quadrille of Britons, Romans, Saxons and Normans – Morris Dance -Mazurka, Knights of the Sword and Rose Maidens – Flirtation, Robin Hood and Maid Marian – Friar Tuck and the Dragon – Two Hobby Horses – General Dance – Pas seul, May Queen – Maypole Dance.

In Scene II, during May Day festivities in the Elizabethan period, the Duke's eldest son comes of age. In Scene III the May Day festivities continue. Mummers and dancers arrive and perform a historical quadrille, a Morris dance, a Maypole dance and Jack in the Green.

- Scenes IV & V – The Legend of Herne the Hunter
  - Windsor Forest, night – Storm – Dance of Hunters – Waltz of Wood Nymphs. Procession of the Yule Log – Galop – Fight of hunters and peasants – Dance of Hunters and Nymphs.

In the forest, a storm is raging. Herne's huntsmen arrive with their kills. Herne enters and commands the hunt to resume; as they move off, the weather calms. Nymphs dance before the Yule-log arrives, together with musicians, mummers and peasants. After dancing around the log, they finally drag it homeward. The nymphs and huntsmen dance together before Herne returns and scatters sends them.

- Scene VI – Christmas Revels in the Time of Charles II
  - Castle Hall; servants, players and guests – Lord and Lady of the Manor – Procession of the Boar's Head and Roast Beef – Entrance of peasants and vassals - Comic Pas de Quatre (Fugue) – Drunken Jester's Dance – Blind Man's Buff – Entrance of Father Christmas – Kissing Dance under the Mistletoe.

In the Hall of an old castle, servants arrange tables for the Christmas festivities. A feast is presided over by the Lord and Lady of the Manor. Vassals and peasants arrive and enjoy various revels and games such as Blind man's buff and a jester's dance. Father Christmas bestows gifts, and everyone dances under the mistletoe.

Scene VIII: Soldiers, sailors and prima ballerina pay homage to Britannia

- Scene VII – Coronation of Queen Victoria Westminster Abbey, 28 June 1838 – Imperial March.
  - Coronation of Queen Victoria, Westminster Abbey, 28 June 1838 – Imperial March.

Tableau vivant of the Coronation of the Queen, incorporating Sullivan's Imperial March.

- Scene VIII – 1897 – Britain's Glory
  - Entrance of English, Irish and Scottish Troops – The Union – Artists' Volunteers – Colonial Troops – Military Manoeuvres – Sailors' Hornpipe – Pas Redouble -Entrance of Britannia -- The Albert Memorial – God Save the Queen!

English, Irish, Scottish and colonial troops arrive, who afterwards manoeuvre together. Volunteers and colonials follow, and sailors dance a hornpipe. Britannia presides over the final tableau.

== Reception ==
The Era, a paper that specialised in theatrical matters, said, "It is not only a beautiful and gorgeous spectacle; it is a lesson in history and historical costume, accompanied by some of the best music ever written for ballet purposes". The Musical Times commented, "If the music of Victoria and Merrie England can scarcely be said to add to the fame of Sir Arthur Sullivan, it is at least a very pleasing example of his genius. … There is also an atmosphere of refinement and finished craftsmanship about the Victoria ballet which can scarcely fail to exercise a salutary influence". The Daily Telegraph said, "It delighted the theatregoer with its wealth of colour and melody" and called the premiere "a series of triumphs for Sir Arthur Sullivan, who has framed a series of English pictures in truly English music".

== Recordings ==
The Royal Philharmonic Orchestra, conducted by Royston Nash, recorded the First Suite from the ballet in February 1978, released as a coupling with the D'Oyly Carte Opera Company's 1979 recording of The Yeomen of the Guard on Decca. The recorded suite runs for just over eleven minutes and comprises Introduction; Berceuse; Druids' march; Mistletoe dance; and May Day festivities. The BBC Concert Orchestra, conducted by Owain Arwel Hughes, recorded the same suite for CPO Records in 1993, released in 1994 as a coupling for the Irish Symphony. That recording runs for thirteen and a half minutes.

The full score, running to more than an hour and a quarter, was recorded for Naxos in September 1993 by the RTE Sinfonietta, conducted by Andrew Penny. It was issued on Naxos's Marco Polo label in 1995 and reissued on the main Naxos label in 2021. Tillett, who wrote the liner notes for the CD, records:

Scenes 1, 2 and 4 are largely Sullivan's own orchestration; scenes 3, 5 and 7 include Sullivan's own work and incorporate hints from other sources; much of the scoring of scene 8 is suggested in notes in the piano reduction, or can be assembled from elsewhere. Only the instrumentation of scene 6 is completely editorial.

== Notes, references and sources ==
=== Sources ===
- Jacobs, Arthur (1984). Arthur Sullivan: A Victorian Musician. Oxford and New York: Oxford University Press. ISBN 978-0-19-315443-8.
- Tillett, Selwyn Tillett (1995). Arthur Sullivan (1842–1900) – Victoria and Merrie England. Munich: HNH International. OCLC 884179983.
- Tillett, Selwyn (1998). The Ballets of Arthur Sullivan. Coventry: Sir Arthur Sullivan Society. OCLC 227181926.
