= Basil Cameron =

English conductor (1884–1975)

Basil Cameron CBE
- Cameron in 1954
- Born: Basil George Cameron Hindenberg; 18 August 1884; Reading, Berkshire
- Died: 26 June 1975 (aged 90); Leominster
- Occupation: Conductor

Basil Cameron CBE (18 August 1884 – 26 June 1975) was an English conductor.

== Early career ==
He was born Basil George Cameron Hindenberg at 34 Waylen Street, Reading, the son of a German immigrant family. His father, Frederick Clementz Hindenberg, was a piano tuner. He took up the violin at age 8, and studied with the organist and composer Tertius Noble at York Minster, and then for four years at the Berlin Hochschule, where his violin teachers were Joseph Joachim and Leopold Auer. Back in England he joined Henry Wood's Queen's Hall Orchestra in 1908 and then the London Symphony Orchestra. In 1912, Hindenberg began conducting at the resort of Torquay, where he included music by Delius and Stravinsky in the repertoire alongside more popular seaside favorites. He also organized festivals dedicated to the music of Wagner (1913) and Strauss (1914), raising the profile of the orchestra.

== World War I and after ==
In 1914, at the start of World War I, it was considered less than ideal in England to bear such a Germanic-sounding name as Hindenberg, so the family name was discreetly dropped and he adopted his third name, Cameron, as his professional surname. Various sources have suggested that the name Hindenberg had initially been adopted because German-sounding conductors could find work more easily than English ones could. It has also been suggested that the name Cameron was his mother's maiden name. Both of these assertions are incorrect.

During the war, Cameron served in the British Army from November 1915 to August 1918, where he rose to the rank of lieutenant and was wounded in action at Bullecourt in 1918. After the war, Cameron led orchestras in many other British seaside resorts, including Brighton, Hastings (from 1923) and Harrogate (from 1924, succeeding Howard Carr). Laudatory reviews by George Bernard Shaw and Percy Grainger increased his renown, and led to London engagements from the Royal Philharmonic Society. Eric Coates, who had been a violinist with Cameron in the Queen's Hall Orchestra, dedicated his Four Ways Suite of 1927 to him. It had been commissioned by Cameron and was premiered in Harrogate that year.

In 1929 Cameron organized an all-British festival in Harrogate, including the music of Bax, Delius, Henry Balfour Gardiner, Joseph Holbrooke, William Hurlstone and Peter Warlock. Also in 1929, Cameron auditioned the pianist Moura Lympany, then aged just 12 years old, and immediately organized her concert debut with him at Harrogate, playing Mendelssohn's G minor Piano Concerto.

In 1930 he guest-conducted with the San Francisco Symphony, and was later invited to become its music director, where from 1930 and 1932 he served as joint music director with Issay Dobrowen. In 1932 he was appointed music director of the Seattle Symphony Orchestra, where he stayed until February 1938.

== Return to England ==
In 1938, he returned to England where he remained for the rest of his career. In 1939 he succeeded Henry Wood as the conductor of the amateur Hull Philharmonic Orchestra. In 1940, he joined the conducting staff of the Proms as an associate conductor to Wood, and began conducting for various orchestras, the London Philharmonic Orchestra most frequently. With the LPO, Cameron conducted the first UK performance of Benjamin Britten's Violin Concerto (on 6 April 1941), and the first UK performance of the Sinfonia da Requiem at the Royal Albert Hall on 22 July 1942.

Cameron played an essential role in the immediate post World War II period at the Henry Wood Promenade Concerts held in the Royal Albert Hall where, with Malcolm Sargent, he was responsible for the bulk of the programming, including the Bach/Brahms evenings. One notable occasion was on 7 September 1945 when Cameron conducted the first performance in England of Schoenberg's Piano Concerto, with the 23-year-old pianist Kyla Greenbaum as the soloist. Despite some underlying hostility the work was received by the audience with unexpected enthusiasm, and (according to The Musical Times) Greenbaum played with "immense courage". Other premieres he conducted at the Proms included E. J. Moeran's Serenade in G (on 2 September 1948) and Alan Bush's Violin Concerto (on 25 August 1949).

== Retirement and death ==
Cameron was appointed a Commander of the Order of the British Empire (CBE) in 1957. On 31 March 1960, while conducting the London Symphony Orchestra at the Royal Festival Hall with Wilhelm Backhaus as soloist, Cameron became ill and could not continue. He retired in 1964, aged 80 years, with a final concert featuring the Symphony No 4 by Brahms and the Symphony of Psalms by Stravinsky.

He was married twice, first to Frances James, and second (in April, 1946) to Phyllis MacQueen, but died (unmarried) in a Leominster nursing home, aged 91.
