= Julian Chagrin =

British-Israeli actor (born 1940)

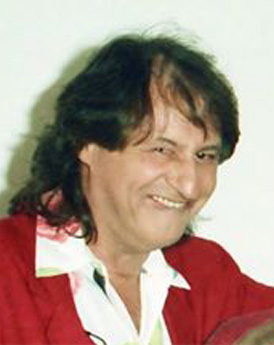
- Chagrin in 1991
- Born: 22 February 1940 (age 86); London, England
- Occupation: Actor
- Years active: 1957–2010
- Spouse: Rolanda Chagrin
- Father: Francis Chagrin

Julian Chagrin; (born 22 February 1940), also credited as Julian Joy-Chagrin, is a British-Israeli retired comedy actor.

== Biography ==
Chagrin was born on 22 February 1940 in London. His father was the composer and conductor Francis Chagrin, who was born to Jewish parents in Bucharest, Romania, while his mother was Irish. He attended St Marylebone Grammar School and subsequently the London Academy of Music and Dramatic Art.

At the age of 17, Chagrin performed as a straight man to comedian Vic Oliver with whom he toured in England, Ireland and South Africa. In the late 1950s, he moved to Paris where he went on to study pantomime with Jacques Lecoq. After returning to the UK, he performed in mime comedy Chaganog.

Chagrin is best known as one of the tennis-playing mimes in the 1966 cult film Blowup, and as the 'secret lemonade drinker' in a popular advert for R. White's lemonade in the 1970s. After appearing in films such as Danger Route (1967), The Bliss of Mrs. Blossom (1968) and Alfred the Great (1969), he played Bill the Lizard in Alice's Adventures in Wonderland (1972), which notably featured Peter Sellers as the March Hare and Spike Milligan as the Gryphon, and he acted with Sellers and Milligan again in The Great McGonagall in 1974. His short films The Concert and The Morning Spider were nominated for the Academy Award for Best Live Action Short Film.

He also appeared as Maxi Grease, an odious TV host, in "Superstar", an episode of The Goodies, and as one half of a murderous comedy duo, together with Jimmy Jewel, in an episode of The Avengers. From 1985 to 1987, he played the part of The Maestro in TV series The Orchestra which he also wrote and directed, alongside Sefi Rivlin. The production won the Golden Rose of Montreux.

== Personal life ==
In 1976, Chagrin relocated to Israel with his first wife. He is currently married to actress and comedian Rolanda Chagrin, with whom he lives in Ein Hod, Israel.

== Filmography ==
=== Feature films ===
- 1966: Blowup
- 1967: Danger Route
- 1968: The Bliss of Mrs. Blossom
- 1969: Alfred the Great
- 1972: Alice's Adventures in Wonderland
- 1974: The Great McGonagall
- 1987: Rumpelstiltskin
- 1987: The Emperor's New Clothes
- 1996: Who's the Father?
- 2022: A Gaza Weekend

=== Short films ===
- 1974: The Concert
- 1976: The Morning Spider
- 2016: Siberia

=== TV series ===
- 1968: The Avengers
- 1970: Please Sir! (Series 3, Episode 10)
- 1972: His and Hers (Episode: "Ballet")
- 1973: The Goodies
- 1985–87: The Orchestra

== Awards and nominations ==
- 1975: Academy Award for Best Live Action Short Film for The Concert (nominated)
- 1977: Academy Award for Best Live Action Short Film for The Morning Spider (nominated)
- 1986: Rose d'Or for Best Comedy TV Series for The Orchestra (won)
