= Rolanda Chagrin =

Israeli actress and comedian

- רולנדה שגרן
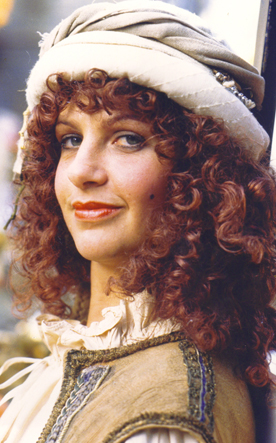
- Born: 7 February 1957 (age 69); Bucharest, Romania
- Occupations: Actress; comedian
- Years active: 1982–present
- Spouse: Julian Chagrin
- Awards: Golden Rose Award

Rolanda Chagrin (Hebrew: רולנדה שגרן; born 7 February 1957) is an Israeli actress and comedian.

== Biography ==
Rolanda Chagrin was born in Bucharest and immigrated to Israel on 1961. Her childhood days she spent in Tel Aviv.

Between 1977 and 1981, she studied acting at Tel Aviv University's Faculty for Theater and was cast for mainly dramatic roles, participating in the plays Mahagony, Waiting for Godot, The Balcony and plays by the Israeli playwright, Hanoch Levin.

After she completed her studies, she was accepted in 1982 as an actress at the Neve Tzedek Theater in Tel Aviv, where she played in Nashim Mukot, directed by Nola Chilton. That same year, she met her future husband, the actor Julian Chagrin at the Pantomime Festival in Kiryat Shmona. Later they toured the world together in a comedy show, appearing in the United Kingdom, Ireland, Australia and Tasmania.

Between 1983 and 1987, she participated in the writing, acting and direction of the comical television series Hatismoret (The Orchestra), which was awarded a Golden Rose Award (Rose d'Or).

In the Akko festival, she acted in Naftali Alter's film, Irit Irit. She also participated in the production of the Cannon Movie Tales by Menachem Golan, and acted in the television shows, The Tzatzkanim ("The RIghteous") and Hopa Hey – a children's programme.

During the years 1989–1991 she participated in the cabaret show Tzitzim.

At 1992 she joined the Cameri Theater in Tel Aviv and was cast in the plays Rosh Meshuga ("Crazy Head"), "Mehager over vashav" ("Emigrant over Immigrant", one of several possible translations of this pun in Hebrew), "Mevaker Hamedina" ("The State Comptroller"), "Shivrei Zchuchit" ("Glass Fragments") and "Striptease Acharon" ("The Last Striptease").

Between 2001 and 2006 she performed her solo-act "Rolanda Ad Hasof" ("Rolanda 'Till The End"), and, beginning in 2007, she performed another solo-act – "Rak Al Aztmi Litzhok Yadati...!" ("I Could Laugh Only About My Self ...!")

== Personal life ==
Rolanda married to actor Julian Chagrin, and they have no children together by Rolanda's choice (Julian has three children from a previous marriage). They live in Ein Hod.
