= Gervase Hughes =

English composer, conductor and writer

Gervase Alfred Booth Hughes (1 September 1905 – July 1984) was an English composer, conductor and writer on music. From 1926 to 1933, Hughes pursued a career as a conductor and chorus master, principally at the British National Opera Company, and also co-produced Shakespeare plays. He left the musical profession in 1933, raising a family and working first as an executive in a railway company and later running luxury European tours. From 1960 to 1972 he published a series of books on musical subjects, beginning with a study of the music of Arthur Sullivan, published in 1960.

== Biography ==
Hughes was born in Birmingham, England, the son of Alfred Hughes, a university professor, and his wife Hester, née Booth. He was educated at Malvern College and Corpus Christi College, Oxford, where he was active in the Oxford University Opera Club for whom he composed a light opera. He graduated with the degrees of Bachelor of Arts and Bachelor of Music in 1927.

From 1926 to 1929 Hughes was on the staff of the British National Opera Company and conducted Carmen, Faust and Samson et Dalila. The company gave several performances of his one-act operetta, Castle Creevey, in 1928–30, and the score was published by Novello & Co. In 1929–30 along with Sir Thomas Beecham and Jack Westrup, he was one of three conductors of the London Opera Festival, for which he arranged and conducted Handel's Giulio Cesare, its first British performance since the composer's lifetime. Herman Klein in The Gramophone commented that the costumes, the lines and the acting "made the audience rock with laughter," but added, "One reservation should be made, however, and that applies to the admirable work of Mr. Gervase Hughes, both in arranging the score and conducting the efficient orchestra, including the faultless accompaniments played upon the harpsichord by Mr. Boris Ord." Between 1926–33 he was associated with Sir Frank Benson and Oscar Asche in Shakespeare productions, presented under the management of "Gervase Hughes Ltd".

In 1933 Hughes gave up music as a profession, though he continued to compose. He married Gwyneth Edwards, formerly an operatic soprano, in April 1934, and the couple had two daughters. From 1934–46 Hughes worked as an executive for the London, Midland and Scottish Railway. From 1947–59 he ran a specialist travel agency offering European tours in Rolls-Royce cars. In 1960 he embarked on a new career as an author of books on musical subjects, publishing eight books in the next twelve years. In 1967 he was appointed a Vice-President of the Gilbert and Sullivan Society, a post he held until his death.

Hughes died in July 1984 at the age of 78.

== Works ==
=== Books ===
Hughes's first book on musical subjects was [The Music of Arthur Sullivan (1960), the first full-length study of the composer, in which he was encouraged and advised by Eric Blom. The book received good reviews and was followed by a wider study of operetta in 1962 called Composers of Operetta (reissued in 1974).

His later books were The Pan Book of Great Composers (1964), reissued in an expanded version as Fifty Famous Composers (1972); Great Composers of the World (1964); The Handbook of Great Composers (1965); Dvořák: His Life and Music (1967); Sidelights on a Century of Music: 1825–1924 (1969); and (with Herbert Van Thal) an anthology, The Music Lover's Companion (1971).

Hughes was a contributor to Opera magazine, Monthly Musical Record, Railway Magazine and other periodicals.

=== Music ===
Hughes completed one grand opera, Imogen's Choice, which was staged in Liverpool in 1929. He started another, based on Twelfth Night, but it was not completed. He wrote three operettas: Castle Creevey, Penelope and Venetian Fantasy. He also composed orchestral works, works for the piano, and songs.
