= Percy M. Young =

British music scholar (1912–2004)

- Born: Percy Marshall Young; 17 May 1912; Northwich, Cheshire
- Died: 9 May 2004 (aged 91); York, England

Percy Marshall Young (17 May 1912 – 9 May 2004) was a British music scholar, editor, organist, composer, conductor and teacher.

== Life and career ==
Young was born in Northwich, Cheshire. His father, twice mayor of Northwich, was a clerk at Brunner Mond Chemical works in Winsford; his mother, Annie née Marshall, was a nurse. Young was educated at the local Sir John Deane's Grammar School, from where he won a scholarship to Christ's Hospital, Horsham, where, taught by Robert Wilkinson, he became senior Music Grecian; and then, in 1930, he won an organ scholarship to Selwyn College, Cambridge, where he read English (studying under Tom Henn), History and Music (studying music history under Edward Dent and organ under Cyril Rootham). Staying a fourth year in Cambridge, taking up the Stuart of Rannoch Scholarship, he was awarded the William Barclay Squire Prize for music paleography. Then from 1934 to 1937 he was Director of Music at Stranmillis Teacher Training College in Belfast, during which years he earned a Mus.D. at Trinity College, Dublin. From 1937 to 1944 Young was Musical Adviser to Stoke-on-Trent Local Education Authority. After that, Young became Director of Music at Wolverhampton College of Technology, a position he would occupy from 1944 to 1966, after which he became an independent scholar, prolific author, music-arranger / -editor and enthusiastic lecturer, broadcaster, adjudicator and examiner. In 1985 he was made a D.Mus., h.c., by The University of Birmingham; and in 1998 he was made an Honorary Fellow of Selwyn College, Cambridge.

Young published more than fifty books. Among those are biographies of musicians Handel (1947), Elgar (five books: 1955–1978), Vaughan Williams (1953), Schumann (1957), Kodály (1964), Sir Arthur Sullivan (1971), Alice, Lady, Elgar (1978), and Sir George Grove (1980). Bossey & Hawkes published his edition of Kodály's "Choral Method". Also, for younger readers, Young wrote a series of ten titles on composers Handel, Haydn, Mozart, Schubert, Beethoven, Tchaikovsky, Dvořák, Debussy, Stravinsky, and Britten. For many years he was Music Editor of the journal "Child Education", published by Evans Brothers.

From fragments left by Elgar Young reconstructed, and published, a suite from unfinished opera The Spanish Lady.

Young edited Gilbert and Sullivan's opera "H.M.S.Pinafore" (2000) for the complete edition of The Savoy Operas (Broude Brothers, New York) and was General Editor of the complete edition.

His own compositions include: "Virgin's Slumber Song" (1932), From a Child's Garden (Robert Louis Stevenson; 1941), Passacaglia for violin and piano (1931), Fugal Concerto in G minor for 2 pianos and strings (1951), Elegy for String Orchestra (1960) and Festival Te Deum (1961). There are also many unpublished pieces for brass ensemble. Piano duo Keith Swallow and John Wilson have recorded his Five Folk Song Duets (1938).

Young was also a keen followers and historian of Association football, writing twelve books on the genre including histories of several League clubs -- Wolverhampton Wanderers, Manchester United, Bolton Wanderers, "Football on Merseyside", "Football in Sheffield" -- plus a history of the game itself (A History of British Football). Young was also a Labour councillor in Wolverhampton, gaining the Wednesfield Heath ward from the Conservatives. In the 1970s he was Chairman of The Council for Community Relations in Wolverhampton.

After the death of his first wife, Netta Carson, Young married Renée Morris in 1969, who survives him, along with three sons and a daughter of his first marriage.

Young's archive is held at the Cadbury Research Library, University of Birmingham.
