= Arthur Jacobs =

Arthur David Jacobs (14 June 1922 – 13 December 1996) was an English musicologist, music critic, teacher, librettist and translator. Among his many books, two of the best known are his Penguin Dictionary of Music, which was reprinted in several editions between 1958 and 1996, and his biography of Arthur Sullivan, which was praised by critics in Britain and America. He was a music critic at newspapers from 1947 to 1975, an editor at Opera magazine from 1961 to 1971, and served on Opera's editorial board from 1971 until his death. He was also a frequent contributor to The Musical Times for five decades. Jacobs taught at the Royal Academy of Music, at Huddersfield Polytechnic, and at universities in the US, Canada, and Australia from 1964 to 1985 and translated more than 20 operas into English.

== Life and career ==
Jacobs was born in Manchester, England, to Jewish parents, Alexander Susman Jacobs and his wife Estelle (née Isaacs). He was educated at Manchester Grammar School and Merton College, Oxford, taking an honours degree in 1946. In World War II he served in India and Burma with the British Army, reaching the rank of lieutenant. In 1953 he married the writer Betty Upton Hughes. They had two sons, Michael Jacobs and Julian Jacobs.

Jacobs was music critic of The Daily Express from 1947 to 1952, The Evening Standard (1956–58), The Sunday Citizen (1959–1965), and The Jewish Chronicle (1963–1975). He reviewed records for Hi-Fi News and Record Review and The Sunday Times and wrote for the arts section of The Financial Times. He was deputy editor of Opera magazine from 1961 to 1971 and served on its editorial board from 1971 until his death. He considered Edward Dent to have been his greatest influence and encouragement, through both personal contact and his writings.

For The Musical Times, between 1949 and 1996, Jacobs wrote on a wide variety of musical topics, including the New York Philharmonic Orchestra, the Three Choirs Festival, Russian song, The Gypsy Baron, Thespis, the Metropolitan Opera, Leonard Bernstein, Così fan tutte, Trial by Jury, Glyndebourne, Otto Klemperer, and composers from Handel to César Franck to Elgar to Janáček. The writer of his Opera magazine obituary commented that he "was an illuminating, often deliberately argumentative writer and speaker. His reviews were trenchant and outspoken at a time when those qualities were less common than they have since become. He loved to challenge received opinions and liked nothing so much as to disconcert a reader or colleague with an outlandish view", adding that "he was also generous to a fault and an absolute fanatic in the matter of giving the young the wherewithal to improve themselves".

From 1964 to 1979, Jacobs was a lecturer at the Royal Academy of Music, teaching the history of opera. He was head of the music department of Huddersfield Polytechnic (now the University of Huddersfield) 1979–84, where he was appointed to a personal professorship in 1984. Overseas, Jacobs was visiting professor at Temple University (Philadelphia) in 1970 and 1971, at McMaster University (Hamilton, Ontario) in 1975 and 1983, and at the University of Queensland (Brisbane) in 1985. After the Queensland post ended, he retired to Oxford, where he died at the age of 74.

== Librettist and translator ==
Jacobs wrote the libretto for Nicholas Maw's 1964 opera, One Man Show, based on a short story by Saki. His colleague Stanley Sadie said of him, "Opera was always at the centre of his interests. He was a firm believer that it was meant to be fully understood, and that meant it should be presented in English to English-speaking audiences. He was a good linguist himself and translated more than 20 operas … in a fluent and direct style that sometimes betrayed (though not often inaptly) his early love of Gilbert and Sullivan." His English translations of German, Italian, French and Russian opera libretti included Berg's Lulu, Berlioz's, Benvenuto Cellini, Donizetti's, L'elisir d'amore, Gluck's Iphigenie en Aulide, Handel's Riccardo Primo, Monteverdi's, L'Incoronazione di Poppea, Richard Strauss's Die schweigsame Frau, Rossini's La Cenerentola, L'italiana in Algeri, and Il Turco in Italia, Schoenberg's Erwartung, Tchaikovsky's The Queen of Spades, and Verdi's Don Carlos.

Writing for The Musical Times in 1961, Jacobs gave examples of stilted translations and contrasted them with vital and natural-sounding ones. He instanced a line from Tosca, "Ah, finalmente! Nel terror mio stolto/ Vedea ceffi di birro in ogni volto!", gave a literal translation ("Ah! at last! In my stupid terror I saw those ugly police snouts in every face") and contrasted it with the original early-20th-century English translation: "Ah! I have baulked them! Dread imagination/ Made me quake with uncalled for perturbation."

== Publications ==
- Music Lover's Anthology, Winchester Publications, 1948
- Gilbert and Sullivan, Parrish, 1951
- A New Dictionary of Music, Penguin, 1958 (reprinted in new editions up to 1996)
- Choral Music, Penguin, 1962
- A Short History of Western Music, Penguin, 1972
- Arthur Sullivan: A Victorian Musician, Oxford University Press, 1984
- The Penguin Dictionary of Musical Performers, 1991
- Henry J. Wood: Maker of the Proms, 1994
- The Opera Guide (with Stanley Sadie), Hamish Hamilton, 1964. Republished as The Pan Book of Opera, Pan Books, 1966 and as The Limelight Book of Opera, Limelight Editions, 1984.

Jacobs also contributed to:

- Decca Book of Opera, Laurie, 1956
- Decca Book of Ballet, Muller, 1958
- A History of Song, Hutchinson, 1960
- Twentieth-Century Music, Calder, 1960
