= List of compositions by Arthur Sullivan =

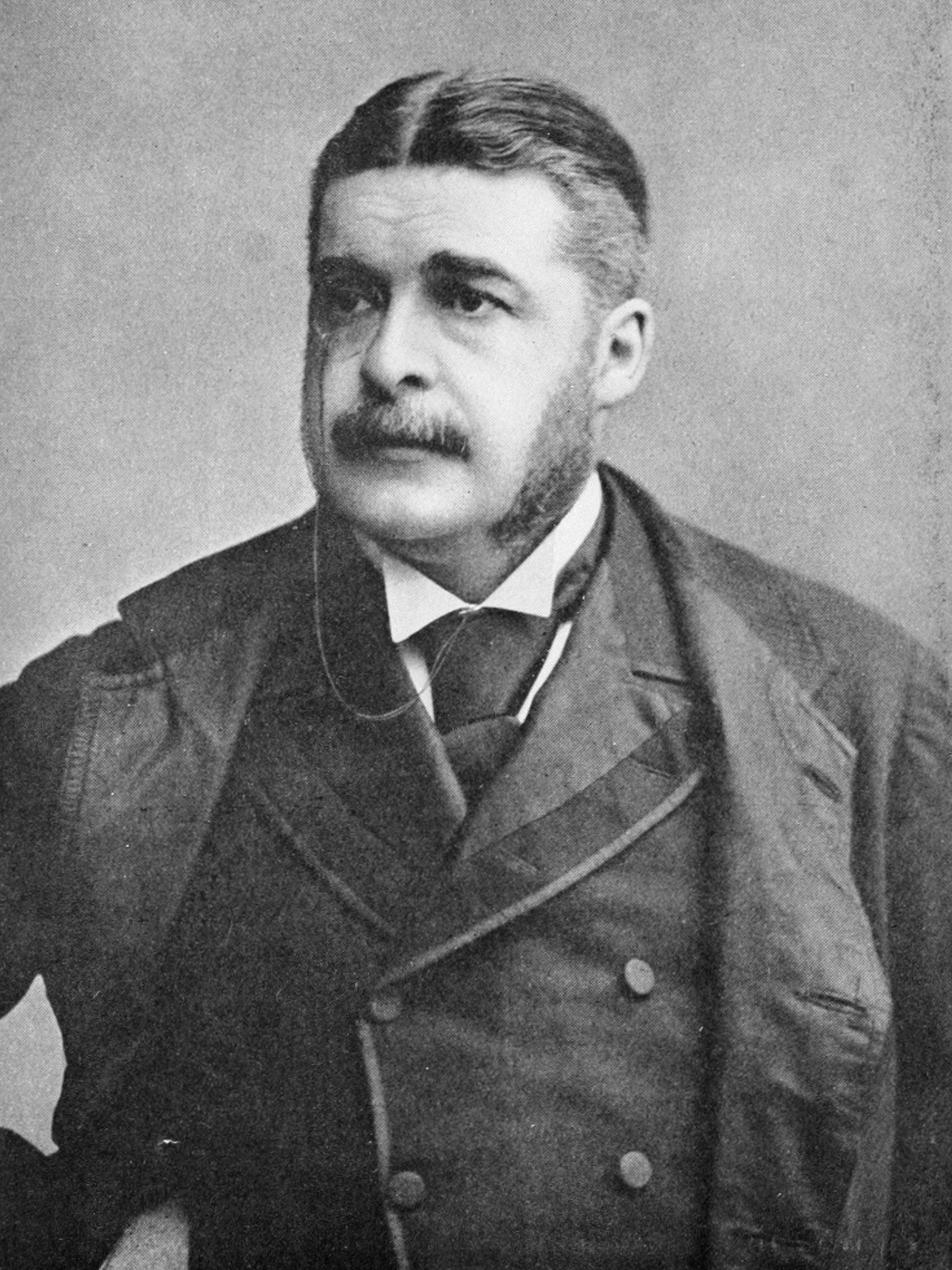
Sir Arthur Seymour Sullivan

The following is a list of musical works by the English composer Arthur Sullivan, best known for his operatic collaborations with W. S. Gilbert. In all, Sullivan's artistic output included 23 operas, 13 major orchestral works, eight choral works and oratorios, two ballets, one song cycle, incidental music to several plays, numerous hymns and other church pieces, and a large body of songs, parlour ballads, part songs, carols, and piano and chamber pieces.

Sullivan began to compose music at an early age. His first known composition, By the Waters of Babylon, dates from when he was eight years old. While a member of the prestigious boys' choir of the Chapel Royal, with the support of the choirmaster, Thomas Helmore, Sullivan composed several more anthems, and one of these, O, Israel, was Sullivan's first published composition, in 1855. Sullivan attended the Royal Academy of Music from 1856 to 1858 and the Leipzig Conservatoire in Germany from 1858 to 1861. As his graduation piece, Sullivan composed a set of incidental music to Shakespeare's The Tempest. Revised and expanded, it was performed at the Crystal Palace in 1862 and was an immediate sensation. He began building a reputation as England's most promising young composer.

Sullivan continued to compose throughout his life. At his death at age 58, he left unfinished a comic opera, The Emerald Isle, completed by Edward German and produced in 1901, and his Te Deum Laudamus, written to commemorate the end of the Second Boer War, which was performed posthumously.

== Theatre music ==
=== Operas ===
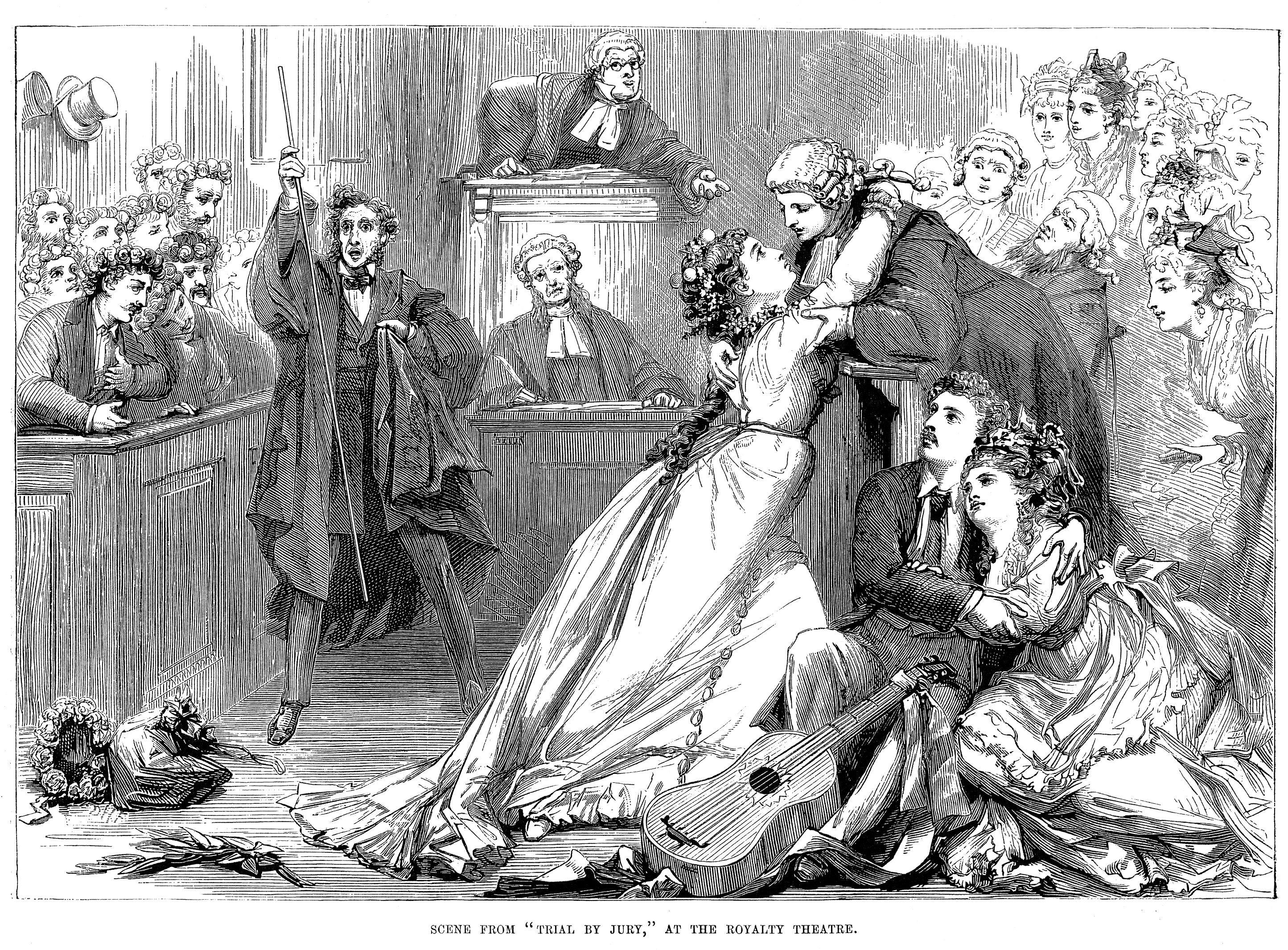
A scene from Trial by Jury as illustrated in the magazine Illustrated Sporting and Dramatic News of 1 May 1875

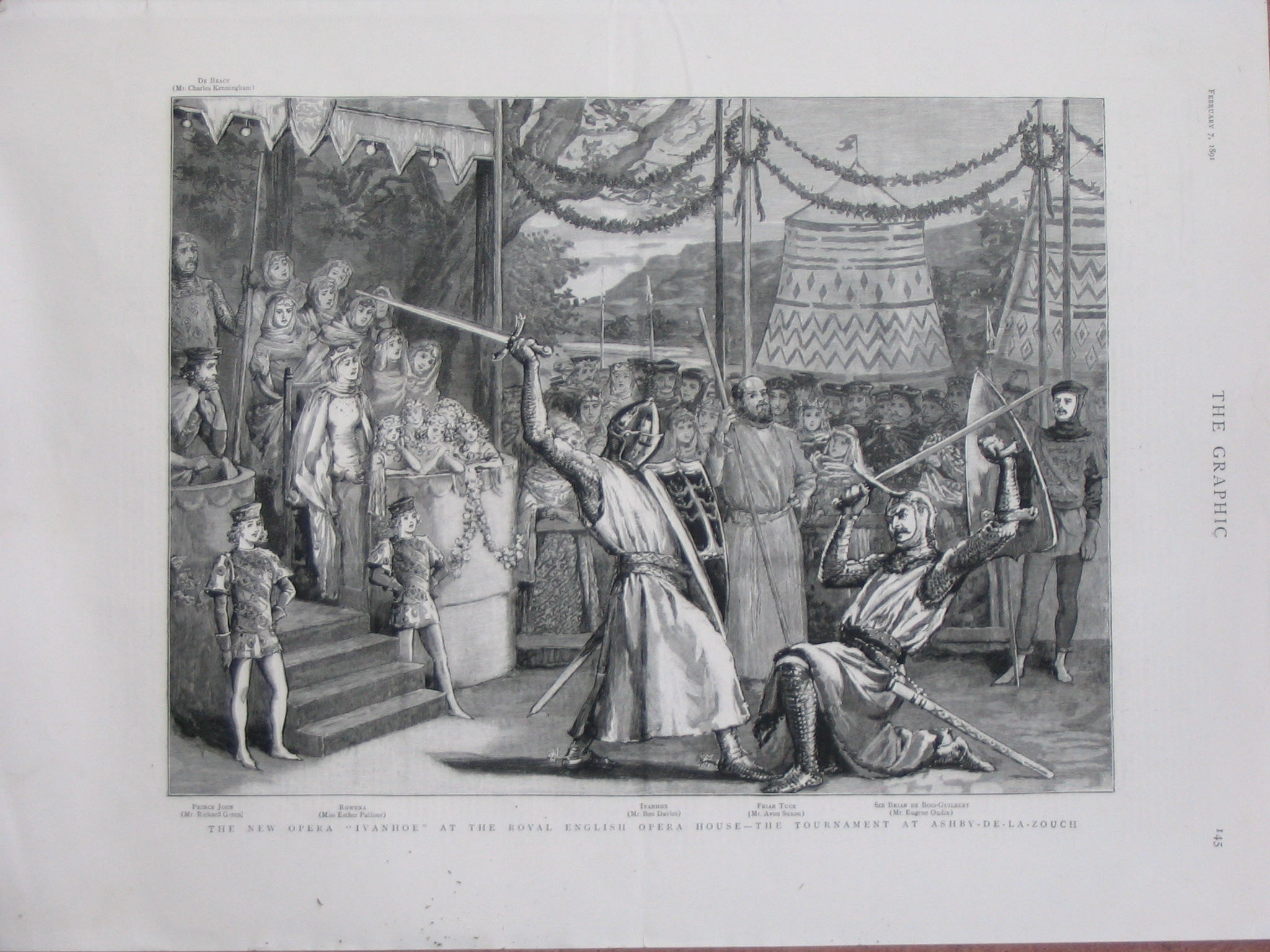
Illustration of scene from Ivanhoe in The Graphic, 1891

- The Sapphire Necklace (ca. 1863; unperformed)
- Cox and Box (1866)
- The Contrabandista (1867)
- Thespis (1871)
- Trial by Jury (1875)
- The Zoo (1875)
- The Sorcerer (1877; revised 1884)
- H.M.S. Pinafore (1878)
- The Pirates of Penzance (1879)
- Patience (1881)
- Iolanthe (1882)
- Princess Ida (1884)
- The Mikado (1885)
- Ruddigore (1887)
- The Yeomen of the Guard (1888)
- The Gondoliers (1889)
- Ivanhoe (1891)
- Haddon Hall (1892)
- Utopia, Limited (1893)
- The Chieftain (1894)
- The Grand Duke (1896)
- The Beauty Stone (1898)
- The Rose of Persia (1899)
- The Emerald Isle (1901; completed by Edward German)

=== Incidental music to plays ===
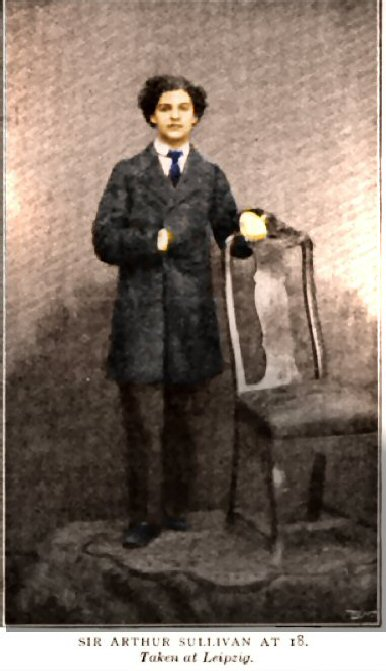
Sullivan at 18, in Leipzig

- The Tempest (1861)
- The Merchant of Venice (1871)
- The Merry Wives of Windsor (1874)
- Henry VIII (1877)
- Macbeth (1888)
- Tennyson's The Foresters (1892)
- J. Comyns Carr's King Arthur for Henry Irving (1895)

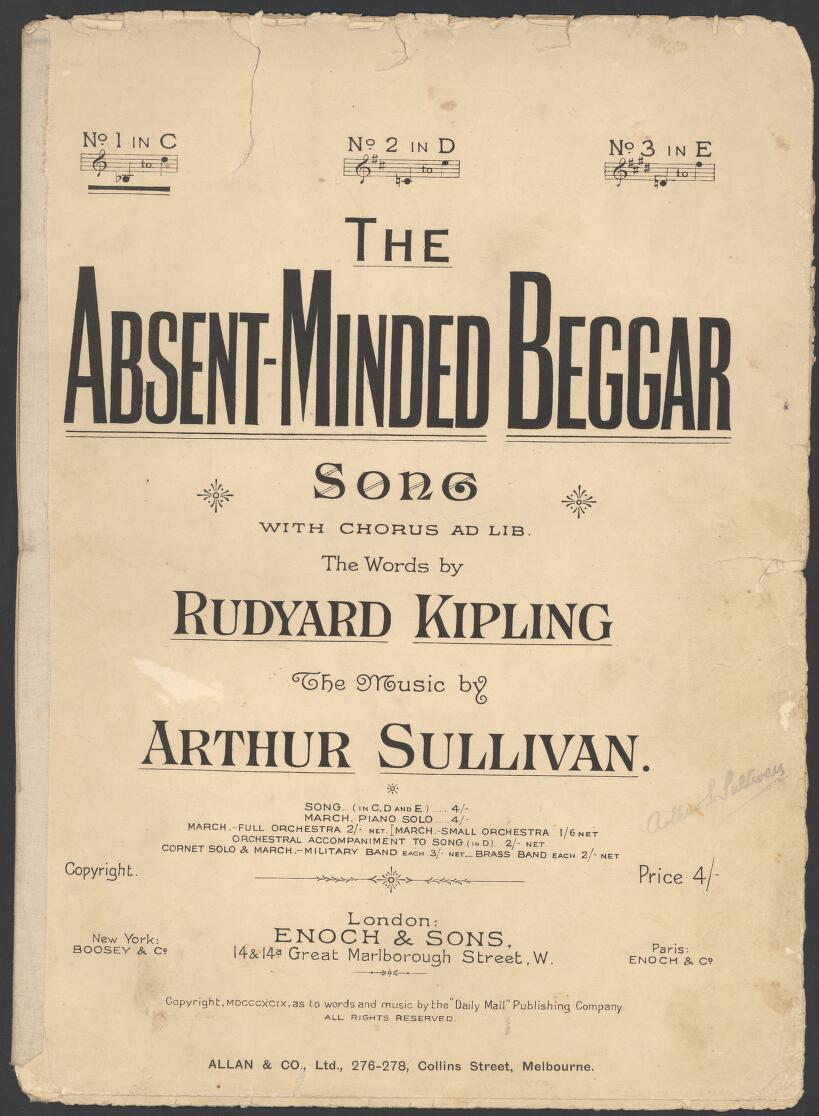
Sheet music

=== Ballets ===
- L'Île Enchantée (1864 ballet)
- Victoria and Merrie England (1897 ballet)

== Choral works with orchestra ==
- The Masque at Kenilworth (1864)
- The Prodigal Son (1869)
- On Shore and Sea (1871)
- Festival Te Deum (1872)
- The Light of the World (1873)
- The Martyr of Antioch (1880)
- Ode for the Opening of the Colonial and Indian Exhibition (1886)
- The Golden Legend (1886)
- Ode for the Laying of the Foundation Stone of The Imperial Institute (1887)
- Te Deum Laudamus (1902; performed posthumously)

== Orchestral works ==
- Overture in D (1858; now lost)
- Overture The Feast of Roses (1860; now lost)
- Procession March (1863)
- Princess of Wales's March (1863)
- Symphony in E, "Irish" (1866)
- Overture in C, "In Memoriam" (1866)
- Concerto for Cello and Orchestra (1866)
- Overture Marmion (1867)
- Overture di Ballo (1870)
- Imperial March (1893)
- The Absent-Minded Beggar March (1899)

== Song cycle ==
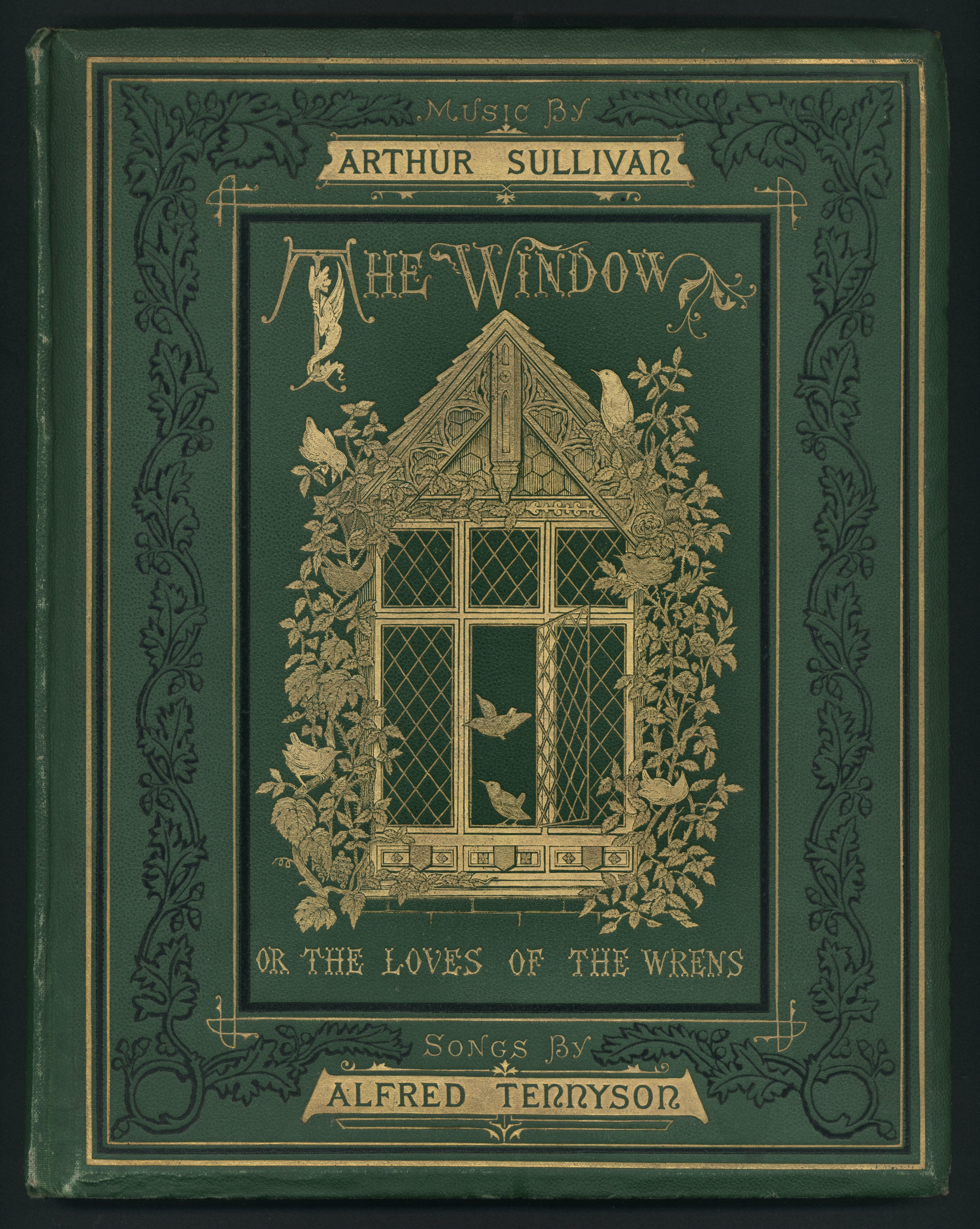
Cover of the score to The Window; or, The Song of the Wrens

- The Window; or, The Song of the Wrens (1871 song cycle)

== Church music ==
Sullivan's church music includes:

- By the Waters of Babylon, c. 1850, unpublished
- Sing unto the Lord, 1855, unpublished
- Psalm 103, a setting of Psalm 103, 1856, unpublished
- We have heard with our ears
  1. Dedicated to Sir George Smart, performed at the Chapel Royal in January 1860
  2. Dedicated to the Rev. Thomas Helmore, published by Novello, 1865
- O Love the Lord, dedicated to John Goss, Novello 1864
- Te Deum, Jubilate, Kyrie (in D major), setting of Te Deum, Psalm 100, Kyrie, Novello 1866
- O God, Thou art Worthy, for the wedding of Adrian Hope on 3 June 1867, Novello 1871
- O Taste and See, dedicated to the Rev. C. H. Haweis, Novello 1867
- Rejoice in the Lord, for the wedding of the Rev. R. Brown-Borthwick on 16 April 1868, Boosey 1868
- Sing, O Heavens, dedicated to the Rev. F. C. Byng, Novello 1869
- I Will Worship, dedicated to the Rev. F. Gore Ouseley, Boosey 1871
- Two Choruses adapted from Russian Church Music, Novello 1874
  1. Turn Thee Again
  2. Mercy and Truth
- I Will Mention the Loving-kindnesses, anthem for Easter dedicated to John Stainer, Novello 1875
- I Will Sing of Thy Power, Novello 1877
- Hearken Unto Me, My People, Novello, 1877
- Turn Thy Face, Novello 1878
- Who is Like unto Thee, dedicated to Walter Parratt, Novello 1883
- I Will Lay Me Down in Peace, 1868, Novello 1910
- Hymns
- Christmas Carols and Songs
- Sacred part songs

== Other works ==
- Songs and Parlour Ballads
- Part songs
- Chamber Music and Solo Piano

== See also ==
- List of W. S. Gilbert dramatic works
- Bibliography of W.S. Gilbert

== Sources ==
- Jacobs, Arthur (1984). Arthur Sullivan: A Victorian Musician. Oxford University Press. ISBN 0-19-315443-9.
