= Corinthian Chamber Orchestra =

English amateur orchestra

The Corinthian Chamber Orchestra is an amateur orchestra based in London, United Kingdom. Formed in 1995 under the musical direction of conductor Alan Hazeldine, it rapidly developed into one of the best orchestras of its kind and its membership consistently includes the very best amateur players available. The orchestra's high standards are maintained by an insistence on thorough preparation and a professional attitude to performance.

The orchestra promotes around six of its own concerts per year (normally at St James's Church, Piccadilly) and also performs in concerts promoted by other organisations. It has played for charity concerts in aid of Cancer Research UK, the North London Hospice, Youth At Risk and The Refugee Council and has made regular appearances with the North London Chorus.

Since its foundation, one of the aims of the orchestra has been to provide opportunities for young soloists to perform with an orchestra of a very high standard. Recent soloists have included the mezzo-sopranos Rosie Aldridge and Adriana Festeu, and the pianists Simon Callaghan, Anna Le Hair and Wu Qian. The orchestra also regularly performs with established artistes, such as Jeff Bryant (French horn), Laura Samuel (violin), David Fletcher (double bass), John Carnac (clarinet), Hannah Gordon (narrator, Peter and the Wolf), Arisa Fujita (violin), Richard Jenkinson ('cello) and So'Ock Kim (violin).

Since the death of their founding musical director in 2008 the orchestra has worked with a number of conductors including Jason Lai, Nick Collon, Dominic Wheeler, Andrew Gourlay, Adrian Brown and Peter Stark.

The Corinthian Chamber Orchestra is a non-profit making enterprise and a registered charity in the UK.
