= Sarah Tenant-Flowers =

- Occupations: Choral director and educator

Sarah Tenant-Flowers is an English choral director and educator. Her well-known show was BBC Maestro series. The Royal Welsh College of Music and Drama considers Tenant-Flowers as one of the "most versatile choral specialists" of England.

== Biography ==
Tenant-Flowers' education in the field of music was from the University of Oxford and Durham University. She secured a Doctoral degree (PhD) from Durham on a thesis which related to the research of the works of Elisabeth Lutyens, an English composer. However, she pursued a career in conducting and arts management. She also studied arts administration and conducting at the Roehampton; Sir Charles Groves, Peter Erdei of the Liszt Academy, László Heltay and Alan Hazeldine of the Guildhall were her teachers.

Tenant-Flowers has conducted several choirs as director. Some of her important assignments were for the National Chamber Choir of Ireland, The Philharmonia Choir of Cape Town, The Harlow Chorus, Kantorei der Friedenskirche of Düsseldorf, English Baroque Choir and Reading Bach Choir.

=== The Sixteen ===
She has been an administrator for Choir of the Year and General Manager of "The Sixteen". She also founded the Association of British Choral Directors (abcd).

Tenant-Flowers' present directorial assignments cover professional and amateur choirs, symphony and chamber choruses, youth and community groups. She also sings as a professional vocal consort Papagena. She has many teaching assignments within the country working for organisations such as the Royal Welsh College of Music & Drama (RWCMD), Association of British Choral Directors (abcd) and Sing for Pleasure.

In March 2012, Tenant-Flowers was the conductor of Nick Bicât's Requiem for Cantata Dramatica, which was the UK premiere of the piece. At the annual composer awards conducted by the British Academy of Songwriters, Composers and Authors (BASCA) she sits as one of the judges.

== Recordings ==
Two of her well-known album recordings are the Reflections and the Count Your Blessings: Hymns and songs to lift the spirit.
