= Adrian Brown (musician) =

British conductor

Adrian Brown (born 1949) is a British conductor. He is a proponent of contemporary music and has several first performances to his credit.

He was educated at Northgate Grammar School for Boys in Ipswich, Suffolk, and was a pupil of the conductor Sir Adrian Boult. After graduating from the Royal Academy of Music in London, he studied intensively with Sir Adrian for some years. He remains the only British conductor to have reached the finals of the Herbert von Karajan International Conducting Competition in Berlin,: in fact, the Berlin Philharmonic was the first professional orchestra he conducted. Sir Adrian wrote: 'He has always impressed me as a musician of exceptional attainments who has all the right gifts and ideas to make him a first-class conductor.'

In 1992 Adrian Brown was engaged to conduct the Saint Petersburg Philharmonic Orchestra. In 1998 Sir Roger Norrington recommended him to conduct the Camerata Salzburg, one of Europe's foremost chamber orchestras. In addition, Adrian has conducted many leading British orchestras including the City of Birmingham Symphony Orchestra, the BBC Symphony Orchestra, the BBC Scottish Symphony Orchestra and the London Sinfonietta.

In 1972 Adrian was appointed music director of Stoneleigh Youth Orchestra a position from which he stood down in March 2013 after 40 years. In honour of this, a Celebratory Concert was held in Cadogan Hall on the 24th of that month. It is felt he has made some contribution to the musical education of quite a few youngsters over a long period. Working with young musicians has also been an area where Adrian Brown has made a valuable contribution to British musical life, as well as in Europe, Japan and the Philippines. He has frequently conducted both the National Youth Orchestra of Great Britain (working closely with Sir Colin Davis and Sir Roger Norrington) and the National Youth Wind Orchestra. He regularly runs courses for young musicians, coaches gifted young conductors and was given the Novello Award for Youth Orchestras at the 1989 Edinburgh Festival.

In 1978 Adrian was appointed conductor of the Newbury Symphony Orchestra which he continued to conduct until 2004.

He has returned to conduct at the Royal Academy of Music and regularly been selected as chairman of the jury for the National Association of Youth Orchestras' Conducting Competition. In 1996 he was flown to Japan to work with the Toyama Toho Academy Orchestra, a visit that was received with much acclaim from all those with whom he worked.

His many most memorable engagements have included Tippett's 'A Child of Our Time', Verdi's Requiem and almost the entire oeuvre of Berlioz, Elgar and Vaughan Williams, all much admired. He received rave reviews in 'The Guardian' for a performance of Strauss's Feuersnot with the Chelsea Opera Group and for his Ein Heldenleben. He has performed successful concerts with the Salomon Orchestra, returning to them in February 2005 for a Concert at St. John's, Smith Square, performing British music including Tippett's Concerto for Orchestra, to acclamation.

Between 2005 and 2008, Adrian Brown conducted many concerts of music celebrating the centenary of Sir Michael Tippett, and joined the panel of jury members of Music for Youth, as well as accepting invitations to perform with the Isle of Wight Symphony, Bromley Ecumenical Singers, and the Hertfordshire Philharmonia, as well as conducting in Dresden and Prague.

This period also included performances of Shostakovich with Suffolk Sinfonia in St Edmundsbury Cathedral and LSO St. Lukes; a return to Elgar/Payne Symphony No.3 in a concert of Anthony Payne's work; while the climax of the Bromley Symphony Season was a stunning Mahler Third Symphony. He conducted tours including Provence and Salzburg for a Mozart Festival, concerts in Snape Maltings celebrating the Elgar Anniversary, and a performance of Hansel und Gretel. He was also appointed conductor of Southgate Symphony.

In his 60th Birthday Year, 2009, Adrian was appointed music director of Huntingdonshire Philharmonic and conducted works with many orchestras on a 'celebration wish list' including Sibelius's Fourth, Mahler's Ninth, and Elgar's First symphonies. He also had a major success conducting the Lithuanian State Symphony Orchestra in Vilnius in a nationally broadcast concert. Bromley Symphony honoured him with a 30th Anniversary/60th Birthday concert in November, where he was presented with a Vaughan Williams autograph letter.

2010 he conducted some forty concerts including an acclaimed performance of Elgar's 'The Dream of Gerontius' in Ely Cathedral, Elgar's Enigma Variations in Girona Cathedral, a stunning debut with the Corinthian Orchestra in Central London and an important lecture to the Berlioz Society where his CD recording from Lithuania of the Berlioz Symphonie fantastique was much admired as one of the best interpretations.

2010–11 included a return for two concerts with the Corinthian Chamber Orchestra, one being in the Queen Elizabeth Hall in June. Programmes of Elgar and of Rachmaninov, the Third Symphony, were received with critical and audience acclaim. Adrian has since been invited to be joint principal conductor of the Corinthian Orchestra. Many concerts in Huntingdon, Bromley and London have included admired readings of 'Gerontius', Mendelssohn's 'Elijah', Sibelius, Nielsen's Fifth and the centenaries of 'Petrushka' and Elgar's Second Symphony. Bromley Symphony celebrated the Mahler Anniversaries of his birth and death with his Fifth Symphony. Waveney Sinfonia presented a special concert of Vaughan Williams and Elgar and Adrian conducted Concerts at the Royal Academy of Music and Royal College of Music with Stoneleigh Youth.

The 2011–12 Season saw three concerts with the Corinthian Chamber Orchestra performing Elgar's First Symphony in May again on the South Bank. This was an amazing success, endorsing opinions that Adrian is a major Elgar Conductor. Bromley Symphony had already enjoyed this understanding with Elgar's Violin Concerto and Sasha Rozdestvensky as soloist. Other works in the repertoire were Mahler's First, Berlioz Fantastique, the Mozart and Brahms Requiems. A Jubilee Concert in Ely Cathedral in June presenting Elgar's Coronation Ode and Berlioz's Te Deum and a similar sell-out Concert with Southgate Symphony ended the season on a patriotic high. Concerts for 2012–13 included one work at least of Britten for the Centenary with every orchestra, appropriate for Suffolk born and bred Adrian. One such instance was a triumphant return to the Salomon Orchestra in February 2013 conducting Sinfonia da Requiem in St John's Smith Square. He performed Britten Songs in the birthplace, Lowestoft, with Waveney Sinfonia, the Violin Concerto conducting the Corinthian Chamber Orchestra in St James', Piccadilly in May and the 'Grimes' 'Sea Interludes' with Hunts Philharmonic. In Bromley, Bruckner's Eighth and the Elgar Cello Concerto with Jamie Walton were highlights. Perhaps though the most moving performance was Tippett's 'A Child of Our Time' with Hunts Philharmonic in 'Memory of A Dear Friend, Sir Colin Davis'. The season ended with a cherished dream; preparation for a performance of Berlioz, 'Les Troyens' which commenced in Summer 2013.

2013 saw Adrian retire from Stoneleigh Youth Orchestra and honoured with being one of three National Figures nominated for a Lifetime Achievement Award by 'Music Teacher' and Classic FM. The season included concerts with Corinthian Orchestra in the Queen Elizabeth Hall, Act I of Wagner's 'Walküre' with Janice Watson, more Britten for the Centenary and Verdi's Requiem with Hunts Philharmonic. He was much admired for the AT Shaw lecture to the Elgar Society in June on the subject of Elgar's 'The Spirit of England'. In the summer of 2013 he was awarded the 'Making Music' NFMS Lady Hilary Groves Prize for services to Community Music, a much appreciated and admired honour.

The 2014–15 Season included a return to the Royal Orchestral Society after a much praised Concert in 2014 and a 35th Season with Bromley Symphony conducting Elgar's First and Mahler's Seventh amongst a varied programme. His on-going success with the Southgate Orchestra saw an 'Eroica' and the César Franck Symphonie. Two Concerts with the Corinthian Orchestra took place in St. James' Piccadilly and he carried on his devoted and much loved work with Waveney Sinfonia and performed with Huntingdon Philharmonic where he gave a Concert marking the outbreak of World War I, conducting 'The Spirit of England' and Vaughan Williams. Adrian also gave a lecture to the Berlioz Society and another on the subject of his teacher, Sir Adrian Boult, to the Elgar Society. He completed his project of performing Berlioz's 'Les Troyens'.

The 2015–16 Season included a performance in St John's Smith Square of Elgar's 'The Dream of Gerontius' with the Royal Orchestral, Sibelius 4th and Bruckner 9th Symphonies with Bromley Symphony and a continuing association with the Corinthian Orchestra giving concerts in London. A major event was a performance of the Delius Cello Concerto with Daniel Benn and the Elgar/Payne Third Symphony both with Southgate Symphony, an orchestra growing in expertise and reputation.

Future plans include a performance of Vaughan Williams' 'Pastoral Symphony' with the Corinthian Orchestra, and the Centenary Season with Bromley Symphony during which also the Centenary of 'The Planets' by Holst will be celebrated; premiered by Sir Adrian Boult, Adrian's Teacher and conducted by that pupil 100 years later. Adrian returns to St John's Smith Square in June conducting a concert with the Royal Orchestral. He also 'goes home' to Ipswich to direct the Trianon Music Group. A major event is a special programme with Waveney Sinfonia in Suffolk performing Elgar's Enigma Variations and Dvořák's Cello Concerto with Daniel Benn. Another is celebrating ten great years with Southgate Symphony Orchestra in July playing Sibelius Second Symphony and Elgar's 'Sea Pictures' with Janice Watson.

Adrian Brown was one of a hundred musicians presented with a Classic FM Award at their Tenth Birthday Honours Celebration in June 2002.
