= Jason Lai (disambiguation) =

Jason Lai may refer to:

- Jason Lai (conductor), a British orchestral conductor
- Jason Lai (policeman), officer in San Francisco Police Department

== See also ==
- Jason
- Lai (surname)
