= Maestro (British TV series) =

2008 British TV series

- Maestro title card
- Created by: Celina Parker
- Presented by: Clive Anderson
- Judges: Sir Roger Norrington; Zoë Martlew; Simone Young; Dominic Seldis; Maxim Vengerov.
- Country of origin: United Kingdom
- Original language: English
- No. of series: 1
- No. of episodes: 6

Production
- Running time: 60 minutes (1st and 5th episodes 90 minutes)
- Production company: BBC

Original release
- Network: BBC Two
- Release: 12 August – 13 September 2008

Maestro is a 2008 reality TV talent show-themed television series produced by the BBC's Classical Music Department in the United Kingdom. It was shown on BBC Two between 12 August and 13 September 2008.

The show features eight celebrities (described by the BBC as "famous amateurs with a passion for classical music") competing for the chance to conduct the BBC Concert Orchestra at the 2008 Proms in the Park at Hyde Park in London on 13 September 2008 as part of the BBC Proms series Last Night of the Proms. The show was presented by Clive Anderson.

== Format ==
The aim for each of the students is to prove that they have what it takes to conduct a piece in the London section of Proms in the Park.

The first stage of preparation was a week-long "Baton Camp" for the students in the last week of May. A mentor has been assigned to each student (see below). The mentors are all established professional conductors, and each will work with their respective protégés, helping them to master the disciplines of orchestral, choral and operatic music with Soprano, Rebecca Evans and Tenor, Alfie Boe. Rehearsals continue throughout the summer, with the students learning how to inspire and engage with the orchestra and the music.

In August the students conduct in the weekly show, which is broadcast on BBC Two in front of a studio audience and an international judging panel made up of acknowledged experts in the field. The contestants conduct the BBC Concert Orchestra (and also learn how to conduct a large choir – in this case, the BBC Symphony Chorus). Each week, one student is eliminated: the marks of the judging panel determine the two weakest contestants, and members of the BBC Concert Orchestra then vote to decide who stays and who must go.

== Judging panel ==
The panel is led by conductor Sir Roger Norrington (who conducted the Last Night of the Proms 2008 at the Royal Albert Hall), and comprises composer and cellist Zoë Martlew, conductor Simone Young and double bassist Dominic Seldis. In the final programme (9 September), a guest judge, the Russian violinist and conductor Maxim Vengerov stood in for Simone Young, who had a prior engagement.

== International versions ==
Franchise with a currently airing season
Franchise with an upcoming season
Franchise with an unknown status
Franchise that had ceased to air

Country/Region	Local title	Network	Winners	Judges	Hosts
Netherlands	Maestro	AVRO (1); AVROTROS (2–)	Season 1, 2012: Lenette van Dongen; Season 2, 2014: Spike; Season 3, 2016: (Canada) Leona Philippo; Season 4, 2017: Maartje van de Wetering; Season 5, 2019: Lucas Hamming; Season 6, 2021: Sor; Season 7, 2023: Chris Zegers; Season 8, 2025-26: Jamai Loman	Current; Ed Spanjaard (7-); Isabelle van Keulen (1-); (United Kingdom) Dominic Seldis (1-); Former; Otto Tausk (1–2); Vincent de Kort (3–5); Henrik Schaefer (6)	Frits Sissing
Norway	Maestro	NRK1	Season 1, 2010: Hilde Louise Asbjørnsen; Season 2, 2020: Herman Dahl	Current; Sarah Övinge (2-); Cathrine Winnes (2-); Eivind Gullberg-Jensen (2-); Guest; Christian Eggen (Final S2)	Season 1, 2010: Espen Beranek Holm; Season 2, 2020: Mikkel Niva
Sweden	Maestro	SVT	Season 1, 2011: Marit Bergman; Season 2, 2013: Cecilia Frode	Cecilia Rydinger (1–2); Tobias Ringborg (2); Staffan Scheja (2); Gustaf Sjökvist (1)	Season 1, 2011: Christian Luuk; Season 2, 2013: Petra Mede

== Contestants and eliminations ==
The following table (containing the contestants along with their mentors) shows the scores obtained each episode by each contestant, along with those who were eliminated (red), and those who were eligible for elimination, but survived (yellow):

Contestant	Episode					
Contestant	1 (no scoring)	2 (out of 40)	3 (out of 40)	4 (out of 40)	5 – first round (out of 80)	5 – second round (public vote)
Sue Perkins (TV & radio presenter, actress and writer); Mentor: Jason Lai	—	35	33	32	67	Winner
Goldie (Electronic music artist, DJ and actor); Mentor: Ivor Setterfield	—	28	35	27	73	Runner-up
Jane Asher (Actress); Mentor: Christopher Warren-Green	—	24	25	29	64	
Katie Derham (TV & radio presenter); Mentor: Matthew Rowe	—	26	30	29		
Alex James (Blur bassist); Mentor: Brad Cohen	—	25	24	23		
Bradley Walsh (Comedian and actor); Mentor: Sarah Tenant-Flowers	—	17	23			
David Soul (Actor); Mentor: Natalia Luis-Bassa	—	22				
Peter Snow (TV & radio presenter); Mentor: Peter Stark	—					
