= The Light of the World (Sullivan) =

Oratorio by Arthur Sullivan

Illustration of the premiere

The Light of the World is an oratorio composed in 1873 by Arthur Sullivan. Sullivan wrote the libretto with the assistance of George Grove, based on the New Testament. The work was inspired by William Holman Hunt's popular 1853–54 painting, The Light of the World. The story of the oratorio follows the whole life of Christ, told mostly in the first person, focusing on his deeds on Earth as preacher, healer and prophet.

The work was first performed at the Birmingham Festival on 27 August 1873 and was the composer's second oratorio, the first being The Prodigal Son (1869).

== Background ==
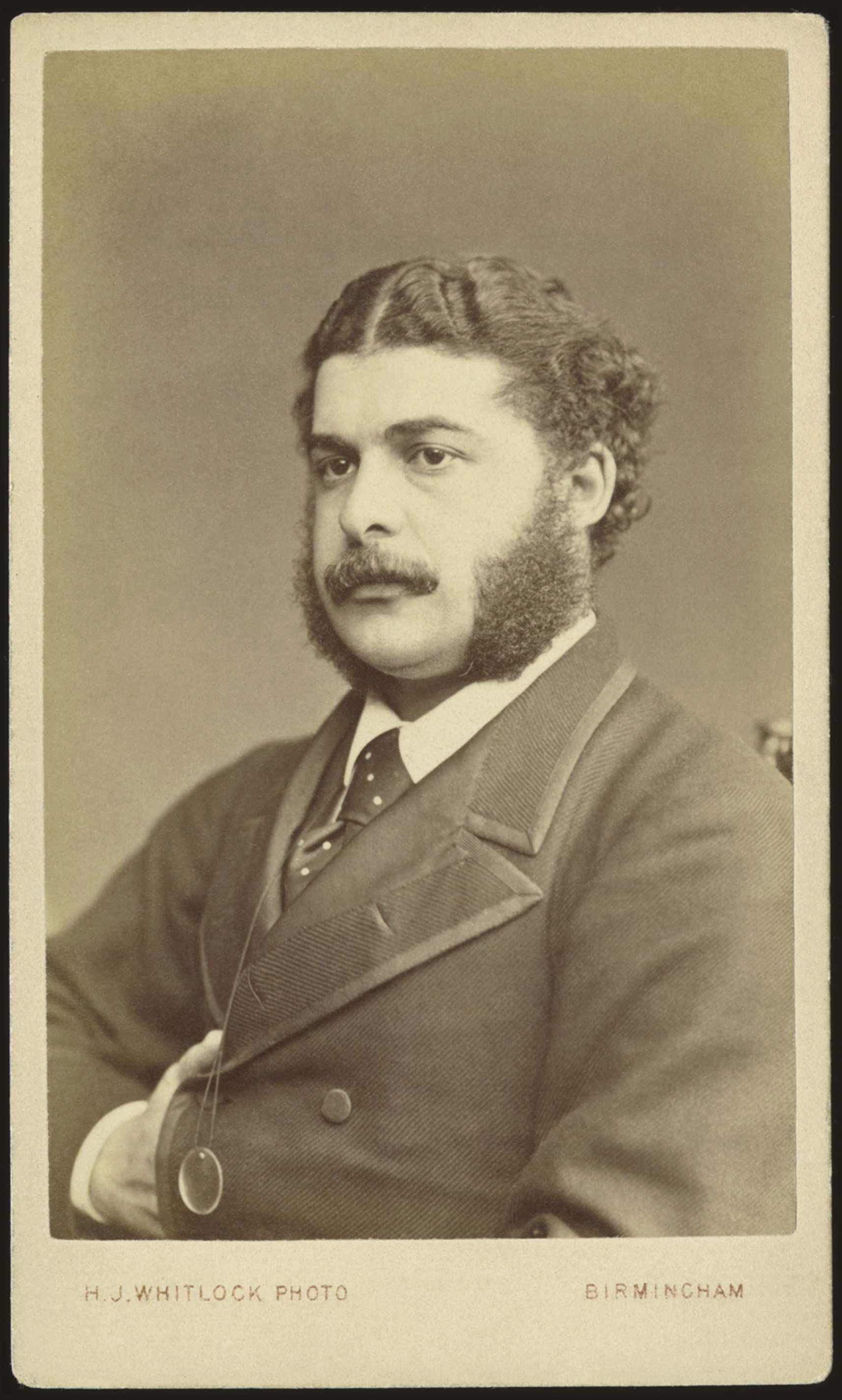
Sullivan in about 1870

Historian Michael Ainger suggests that the idea for the libretto of The Light of the World came to Sullivan when he viewed a chapel near Norwich, England, in September 1872. Composing the oratorio occupied Sullivan during much of 1873. Sullivan's introduction to the work says that, unlike Handel's Messiah, which focuses on Christ's "spiritual idea", or J. S. Bach's Passion music, which focuses on Christ's suffering, the purpose of The Light of the World is to "set forth the human aspect of the life of our Lord on earth, exemplifying it by some of the actual incidents in his career, which bear specially upon His attributes of Preacher, Healer and Prophet." Like Mendelssohn's Elijah, the events in the oratorio are related in the first person, with the characters, including Christ, speaking directly to the audience.

Sullivan made several visits to Birmingham to rehearse the chorus. During the rehearsal period, Alfred, Duke of Edinburgh (a son of Queen Victoria), announced his engagement to the Grand Duchess Marie Alexandrovna of Russia, daughter of Tsar Alexander II. The Duke and Duchess married in 1874. Sullivan was a friend of the Duke's, and upon learning of the betrothal, he sought and received permission to dedicate the oratorio to Grand Duchess Marie.

The Duke was present at the premiere at the Birmingham Festival on 27 August 1873. The soloists were Thérèse Tietjens, Zelia Trebelli-Bettini, John Sims Reeves and Charles Santley. As Sullivan appeared on the platform to conduct his new work, he was met with a "hearty and unanimous greeting.... The last outgrowth of his genius leaves far behind all that preceded it", reported The Times. The President of the Festival, the Earl of Shrewsbury, publicly congratulated the composer at the end of the performance, amidst the cheers of the audience.

Sullivan was presented with a "handsome silver cup and a considerable sum of money" after the premiere, and he derived income from the sale of scores. Nevertheless, his earnings from the oratorio amounted to a small sum compared with the fortune that he would later make from composing the Savoy operas with W. S. Gilbert. After its premiere in Birmingham, performances followed in other towns and cities. The Light of the World was widely performed throughout Great Britain and elsewhere during Sullivan's lifetime. Since then it has seldom been performed. Its first professional recording, with the BBC Symphony Chorus and the BBC Concert Orchestra, conducted by John Andrews, was released in 2018.

== Critical reaction ==
As noted by the critic in The Times, Sullivan took on a difficult task in retracing the ground covered by Handel's Messiah. The press was, initially, enthusiastic. The Observer wrote: "The oratorio is one of imagination, of not only clever ideas, but of really devotional religious thought. The orchestra is handled throughout in a manner which only one who is fully acquainted with each instrument, its individual capabilities, and its effect in combination, is able to appreciate. The instrumentation is never obtrusive, but it is always delicate and expressive, while many orchestral passages are notable for the beauty of the scoring. The vocal parts, solo and choral... exhibit great talent in treatment, and, considering the nature of the subject, are written with considerable variety. In conclusion The Light of the World is a great production.

Similarly, The Standard commented, "After due reflection the general opinion is that in his oratorio Mr. Arthur Sullivan has enriched the world's musical library with a fine work, distinctly representative of the modern school of composition, and calculated to exist in that sphere where it holds a prominent position as a specimen of the new type of oratorio, the dignity of which it upholds. Considering the difficulties of precedent with which Mr. Sullivan had to deal, in Handel's Messiah and Bach's Passion music, not to mention Mendelssohn's unfinished Christus, he may be said to have entered the lists against an array of giants. To say that in the face of these he has held his own ground, if he has not encroached on theirs, is to bestow praise of the highest significance. ... The Light of the World ... even steers clear of that magnetic rock, Mendelssohn, upon which so many fair and well-freighted barks have been lured to their doom.

While Charles Gounod described the work as a masterpiece, by 1899 reviewers no longer put it in the same class as the greatest oratorios: "The Light of the World may not take rank with the highest examples of oratorio art, but its undoubted merits entitle it to an honoured and intimate companionship with its more favoured brethren." Some subsequent critical assessments have not been even this kind. "Only rarely in the course of this ponderous two and three-quarter hour progress does the vital composer of The Tempest and the Irish Symphony surface", wrote Christopher Webber in 2000. Another reviewer found a middle ground: "The main weakness of The Light of the World [is] the lifeless music given to the baritone (Jesus) part. ... Study of this score revealed ... many fine choruses, brilliant solos, and beautiful pastoral passages. While not of a consistency or individuality of The Martyr of Antioch or The Golden Legend, The Light of the World has more than enough virtues to justify a professional revival."

The first professional recording of the piece, released in 2018, has drawn enthusiastic assessments of the work. In awarding the recording 5 stars out of five, Robert Hugill praised the vocal writing, use of text, "daring" first-person approach, "striking and often colourful orchestrations" and the dramatic characterization of the chorus. He concluded that the piece "is easily overlooked ... there is much of interest in the piece and repeated listening has made me come to appreciate it rather more". Andrew Achenbach, in Gramophone, agreed:

The Light of the World … emerges after many decades of unjust neglect as a splendidly distinctive, unstuffy achievement, brimful of captivating melodic charm, communicative flair and technical confidence, always displaying an enviably sure dramatic instinct. … Especially imaginative is Sullivan’s deployment of an inner-orchestra to accompany the words of Jesus, the mellow timbre of violas, cellos, cor anglais, bass clarinet and contrabassoon registering to frequently ear-pricking effect. Listen out, too, for a clutch of exhilarating, at times arrestingly Lisztian choruses. ... Other highlights include the lovely quintet "Doubtless thou art our Father" and soprano aria "Tell ye the Daughter of Zion" (such enchantingly Mendelssohnian clarinets), the powerful Overture to Part 2, Mary Magdalene’s almost operatic "Lord, why hidest thou thy face?", and that piercingly expressive orchestral interlude that opens the final scene entitled "At the Sepulchre – Morning" (pre-echoes here of Elgar). Wonderfully affecting, too, is the purely orchestral introduction to the memorable "Weep ye not for the dead", and the sublime unaccompanied vocal quartet "Yea, though I walk through the valley".

== Musical numbers ==
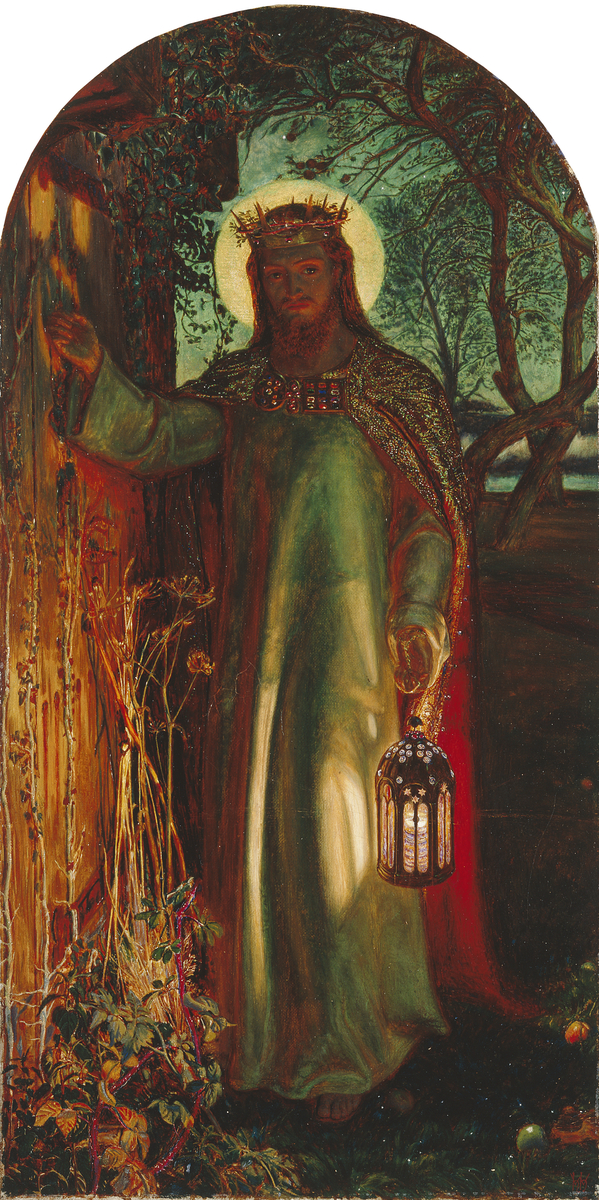
The Light of the World, the painting that inspired the oratorio

The First Part

- No. 1 Prologue (Chorus) – There shall come forth a rod

Bethlehem

- No. 2 Introduction and Recitative – There were shepherds
- No. 3 Chorus of Angels – Glory to God
- No. 4 Chorus of Shepherds – Let us now go even unto Bethlehem
- No. 5 Solo (bass) – Blessed art thou
- No. 6 Air (Soprano) – My soul doth magnify the Lord
- No. 7 Sullivan omitted this number
- No. 8 Chorus of Shepherds – The whole earth is at rest
- No. 9 Solo (Contralto) – Arise and take the young child
- No. 10 Solo (Soprano) & Chorus – In Rama was there a voice heard
- No. 11 Air (Tenor) – Refrain thy voice from weeping
- No. 12 Solo (Contralto) – Arise and take the young child
- No. 13 Chorus – I will pour my spirit

Nazareth — In the Synagogue

- No. 14 Solo (Baritone) & Chorus – The spirit of the Lord
- No. 15 Quintet – Doubtless thou art our Father
- No. 16 Solo (Baritone) – Blessed are they that are persecuted
- No. 17 Chorus – He maketh the sun to rise

Lazarus

- No. 18 Duet (Tenor & Baritone) – Lord, behold he whom thou lovest
- No. 19 Solo (Contralto) & Chorus – Weep ye not for the dead
- No. 20 Scena (Soprano & Baritone) – Lord, if thou hadst been here
- No. 21 Chorus – Behold how He loved him
- No. 22 Solo (Baritone) – Said I not unto thee
- No. 23 Chorus – The grave cannot praise thee

The Way to Jerusalem

- No. 24 Solos – Perceive ye how
- No. 25 Chorus of Children – Hosanna to the Son of David
- No. 26 Air (Soprano) – Tell ye the daughter of Zion
- No. 27 Chorus of Disciples – Blessed be the Kingdom
- No. 28 Trio & Chorus – Hosanna to the Son of David

The Second Part

Jerusalem

- No. 29 Overture
- No. 30 Solo (Baritone) – When the Son of Man
- No. 31 Solos & Chorus – Is this not He whom they seek to kill
- No. 32 Chorus of Women – The hour is come
- No. 33 Solo (Baritone) – Daughters of Jerusalem
- No. 34 Quartet (Unaccompanied) – Yea, though I walk through the valley
- No. 35 Chorus – Men and brethren

At the Sepulchre

- No. 36 Recitative (Soprano) – Where have they laid Him
- No. 37 Aria (Soprano) – Lord, why hidest thy face?
- No. 38 Recitative – Why weepest thou?
- No. 39 Aria (Contralto) – The Lord is risen
- No. 40 Chorus – The Lord is risen
- No. 41 Solo (Tenor) – If ye be risen
- No. 42 Chorus – Him hath God exalted

== Recordings ==
- Natalya Romaniw, Eleanor Dennis, Kitty Whatley, Robert Murray, Neal Davies, BBC Symphony Chorus, BBC Concert Orchestra, John Andrews, Dutton (2018).
- Chöre an der Christuskirche, Peter Gortner, Rosette Records Carlsruhe, Germany (2025) ASIN: B0F2B7793D
