= Festival Te Deum =

1872 composition by Arthur Sullivan

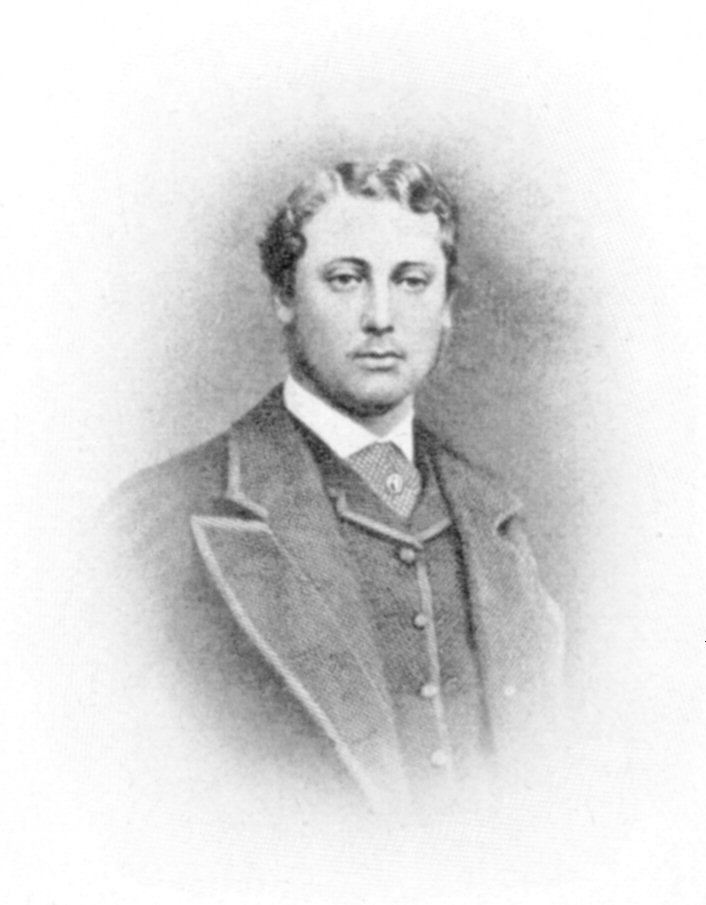
Prince Edward, c. 1870

The Festival Te Deum is the popular name for an 1872 composition by Arthur Sullivan, written to celebrate the recovery of Albert Edward, Prince of Wales (later King Edward VII of the United Kingdom) from typhoid fever. The prince's father, Prince Albert, had died of typhoid fever in 1861, and so the prince's recovery was especial cause for celebration.

The Festival Te Deum was first performed on 1 May 1872 at The Crystal Palace in a special "Thanksgiving Day" concert organised by the Prince's brother, Alfred, Duke of Edinburgh, who was a friend of Sullivan's and commissioned the piece. Sullivan was allowed to dedicate the work to the prince's mother, Queen Victoria: an unusual honour. The soloist was Therese Titiens, who had been the soprano soloist in Sullivan's earlier The Prodigal Son.

== Description ==
The libretto uses an English translation of the traditional Te Deum, in praise of God, with the addition of a "Domine salvum fac" ("O Lord, save the Queen!"), divided up into seven self-contained sections. There are multiple choral fugues throughout, and the score calls for instrumentation on a grand scale, including the addition of a full military band to the orchestra, chorus, and organ in the final section.

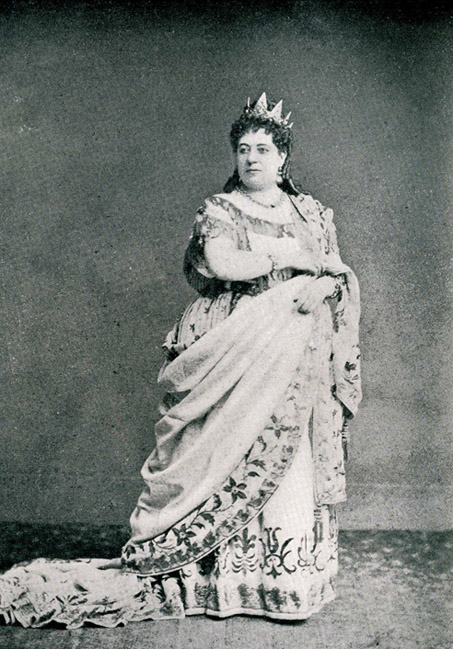
Thérèse Tietjens, the original soprano soloist

At the original performance, the London contingent of the Handel Festival Choir of 2,000 performers constituted the chorus, and the audience numbered 26,000. The Times wrote, "we are glad to be able to speak in terms of unqualified praise. It is not only, in our opinion, the most finished composition for which we are indebted to [Sullivan's] pen but an honour to English art." Sullivan was "uproariously cheered" at the premiere.

The first section begins with a reference to the hymn tune St. Anne, which is repeated in the final section, suggesting that divine intervention played a part in the recovery of the Prince. Handel's influence is heard throughout the piece, including in the fugues, and Sullivan uses key selection to emphasize sacred and secular sections of the piece. Soprano solo or choral sections alternate in a broad dynamic range to illustrate the text. The piece, in keeping with the spirit of the occasion, is often upbeat, even exuberant in places.

While Sullivan was writing the Festival Te Deum, his first opera with W. S. Gilbert, Thespis, was still being performed. Sullivan was also busy composing The Light of the World (an oratorio for the Birmingham festival), and a cantata for the opening of a London exhibition.

The BBC broadcast the piece in 1988 and later the recording was released on CD.

== Text ==
The complete text of the Festival Te Deum is as follows, ignoring the repetitions:

1. Chorus

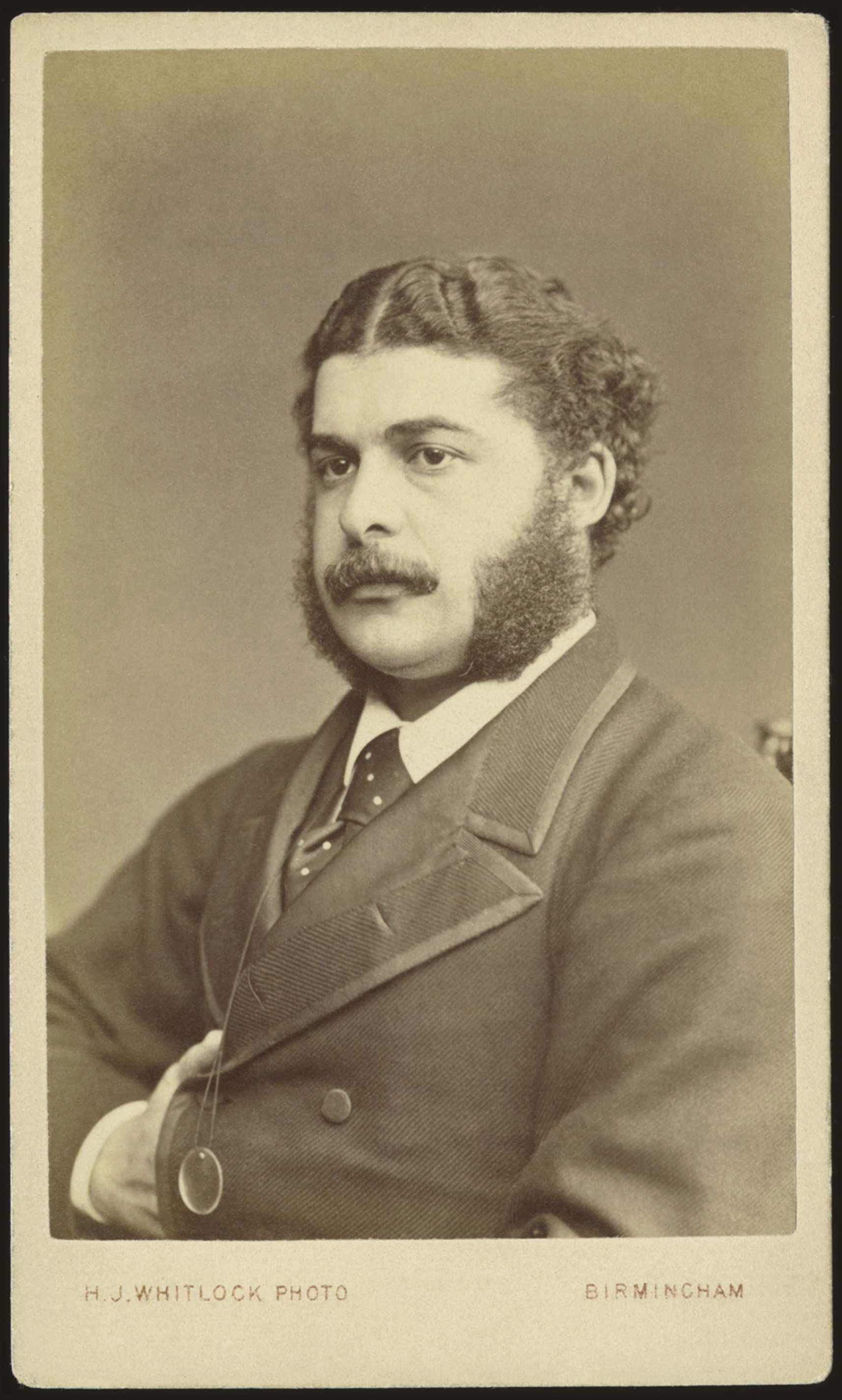
Sullivan, c. 1870

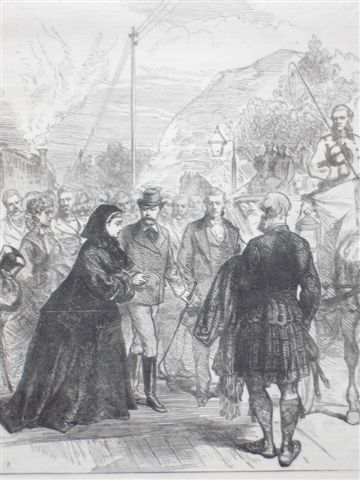
Victoria visits Edward during his illness.

We praise thee, O God: we acknowledge thee to be the Lord.
All the earth doth worship thee: the Father everlasting.
To thee all Angels cry aloud: the Heavens and all the powers therein.

2. Solo (soprano) and Chorus
To thee Cherubim and Seraphim: continually do cry,
Holy, Holy, Holy: Lord God of Sabaoth;
Heaven and earth are full of the Majesty: of thy Glory.

3. Chorus
The glorious company of the Apostles: praise thee.
The goodly fellowship of the Prophets: praise thee.
The noble army of Martyrs: praise thee.
The holy Church throughout all the world: doth acknowledge thee;
The Father: of an infinite Majesty;
Thine honourable, true: and only Son;
Also the Holy Ghost: the Comforter.
Thou art the King of Glory: O Christ.
Thou art the everlasting Son: of the Father.

4. Solo (soprano)
When Thou tookest upon Thee to deliver man: thou didst not abhor the Virgin's womb.
When thou hadst overcome the sharpness of death: thou didst open the Kingdom of Heaven to all believers.
Thou sittest at the right hand of God: in the Glory of the Father.

5. Chorus
We believe that Thou shalt come: to be our Judge.
We therefore pray Thee, help Thy servants: whom Thou hast redeemed with Thy precious blood.
Make them to be numbered with Thy Saints: in glory everlasting.

6. Solo (soprano) and Chorus
O Lord, save Thy people: and bless Thine heritage.
Govern them: and lift them up for ever.
Day by day: we magnify thee;
And we worship thy Name: ever world without end.

7. Chorus
Vouchsafe, O Lord: to keep us this day without sin.
O Lord, have mercy upon us: have mercy upon us.
O Lord, let Thy mercy lighten upon us: as our trust is in thee.
O Lord, in thee have I trusted: let me never be confounded.
O Lord, save the Queen: and mercifully hear us when we call upon thee. Amen.
