= Lady Hilary Groves Prize =

The Lady Hilary Groves Prize is awarded annually, to an individual who has made an "outstanding contribution to music in the community", by the United Kingdom-based Making Music. The recipient must be a member of a Making Music member group.

The award was established in 2000 as the Sir Charles Groves Internal Prize after Charles Groves and was renamed in 2003 after the death of his wife, Lady Hilary Groves, the vice-president of Making Music.

Winners receive a certificate signed by Katharine, Duchess of Kent, who is Making Music's patron.

== Winners ==
Recipients include:

- 2000: Richard White of the Phoenix Singers, Shrewsbury
- 2001: Elizabeth Emerson of Young Musicians Stornoway
- 2002: Valerie Baulard of the Langcliffe Singers, Yorkshire
- 2004: David Aylett of Aylesbury Festival Choir
- 2005: Martin Hooper of Sowerby Music Club
- 2006: Margaret Frogson of Nottingham Symphonic Winds
- 2007: Vivienne Bellos of Alyth Choral Society
- 2008: Julia O'Connor-Beach of Tyndale Choral Society
- 2009: Dr. Maheshwar Godbole of the Indian Classical Music Society
- 2010: Victoria Vandy of Watford Symphony Orchestra
- 2012: Peter and Vivien Harrison of Grayshott Concerts and Graham Reid of Aberdeen Strathspey & Reel Society
- 2013: Adrian Brown of Stoneleigh Youth Orchestra Society
- 2014: Andrea Encinas of British Gospel Arts
- 2015: Angela Kay of Music for Everyone
- 2016: Lila Hallett of Chester Music Society
- 2017: Clare Edwards of notorious
- 2018: Mark Lawrence of Big Friendly Choir
- 2019: Andy Jackson of The Cobweb Orchestra
- 2020: Vilma Weaver of Ashira Singers
