= Margaret Frogson =

British musician and businesswoman

Margaret Frogson MBE is an English musician and businesswoman.

== Life and career ==
Frogson was born in Covenham, Lincolnshire. In 1983, she co-founded Windblowers, a musical instrument shop, in Nottingham. In 2022, the shop closed, after operating for 40 years. In December 2022, the shop was purchased by new owners, and reopened in Beeston.

In 1987, Frogson founded Nottingham Symphonic Winds, a charity musical ensemble.

== Awards ==
- 2016: Lady Hilary Groves Prize Awarded for her significant contribution to music in the region.
- 2016: MBE for "services to Community Music in East Midlands".
