= Te Deum Laudamus (Sullivan) =

Choral work by Arthur Sullivan

Cover of the vocal score

Arthur Sullivan's Te Deum Laudamus—A Thanksgiving for Victory, usually known as the Boer War Te Deum, is a choral work composed by Sullivan in the last few months of his life. It was commissioned on behalf of Dean and Chapter of London's St. Paul's Cathedral by the cathedral's organist, Sir George Martin, as part of a grand service to celebrate the expected British victory in the Second Boer War.

The Boer War Te Deum was first performed at St. Paul's Cathedral on 8 June 1902, eight days after the official ending of the war, and 18 months after the deaths of both Sullivan and Queen Victoria. The piece was composed for chorus, brass, strings and organ, and features as a recurring theme the melody of Sullivan's hymn tune "St. Gertrude", his setting for "Onward Christian Soldiers".

== Background ==
Arthur Sullivan became Britain's most famous composer during the late Victorian era, and so he was an obvious choice to compose a piece to celebrate the coming end of the Second Boer War. George Martin and Colonel Arthur Collins visited Sullivan in his home on May 26, 1900, to ask him to write the Te Deum. Sullivan wrote in his diary that he consented to try and see what he could do.

Sullivan encountered some delays in the course of composing the Te Deum, including a difficult trip to Germany in June 1900. Despite Sullivan's fame and popularity in Germany, the country's attitude toward the Boer War dampened Sullivan's reception. In addition, Sullivan had already committed to working on the comic opera The Emerald Isle for the Savoy Theatre and was forced to put it aside to work on the Te Deum. Sullivan noted in his diary in July 1900 that he was essentially finished with the Te Deum. Soon afterwards, he grew ill, and in October he gave Martin final instructions about staging the work. Sullivan died in November, before he could complete The Emerald Isle, leaving that opera to be finished by his friend Edward German.

The Te Deum finally premiered 18 months after Sullivan's death at St. Paul's Cathedral on 8 June 1902 as part of a larger service celebrating the end of the Second Boer War. King Edward and other members of the royal family were in attendance. The King and Queen entered the cathedral to Sullivan's hymn Onward Christian Soldiers.

== Analysis and criticism ==
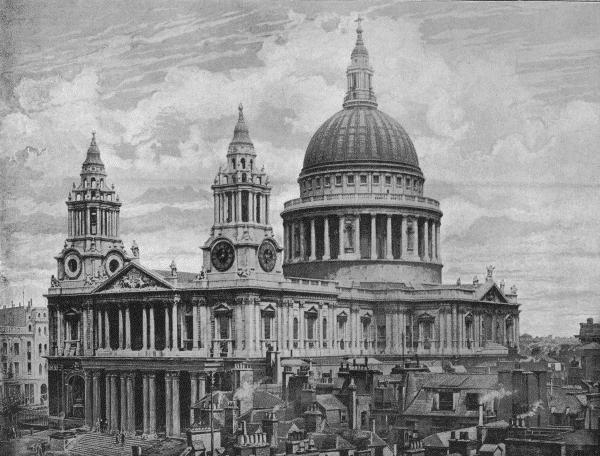
St. Paul's Cathedral, where the work premiered and where Sullivan is buried, by order of Queen Victoria

The Boer War Te Deum was Sullivan's last-completed major work. The text is the ancient Christian hymn as translated in the Book of Common Prayer, showing Sullivan's "personal Christian commitment" at the end of his life. In addition, his use of his popular hymn tune, "St. Gertrude", throughout the Te Deum is the most prominent self-reference that Sullivan allowed himself in his career, underlining the very personal nature of this final work and his love of his church and country. Benedict Taylor wrote that unlike Sullivan's earlier Festival Te Deum,

the work is relatively subdued, more self-effacing, concise and emotionally subtly-tinged.... A compact, single movement work of about a quarter-of-an-hour's duration... [its] musical sections corresponding to the traditional divisions of the liturgical text run into one another without break. A degree of unity across the sectional, evolving structure is provided by cyclic features... and the use of common or related material for successive sections.... Of possibly even greater structural cohesion is the pervasiveness of march-like figures throughout the work, principally rhythmic but often also employing repeated notes or arpeggiac figures characteristic of the hymn tune 'St Gertrude'.... It is a work whose grandeur and restrained dignity have made it cherished and esteemed....

Contemporary critics also reviewed the piece favourably. The Daily Telegraph wrote, "Then the Service reached its central episode with the Te Deum sung to Sir Arthur Sullivan's music, deprived, through the absence of strings, of its full orchestral beauty, but wrought up from exquisite tenderness to a pitch of dignity and strength." Note the reference in the previous quote to the absence of strings: The cathedral was unable to procure a suitable string section, and so the Te Deum was premiered without strings. The Musical Times was also favourably impressed by the piece:

In every page of the score we can trace the hand of the skilled musician, once a Chorister of the Chapel Royal. Moreover the work is impregnated with a robustness distinctly national in the directness of its diatonic expression. The introduction of the composer's familiar hymn tune 'Onward Christian Soldiers' — first in fragments and afterwards in its entirety — infuses a military element into this Thanksgiving Te Deum, the significance of which is obvious.

== Recordings ==
The entire work appears on That Glorious Song of Old (1992), conducted by Paul Trepte, but without a full orchestra.

A complete recording with full orchestra appears on The Masque at Kenilworth — Music for Royal and National Occasions (1999), conducted by Michael Smedley.

A complete recording was released on CD in 2003 by Hyperion, paired with Sullivan's cantata The Prodigal Son. The recording features the New London Orchestra and the London Chorus, conducted by Ronald Corp.

== Text ==
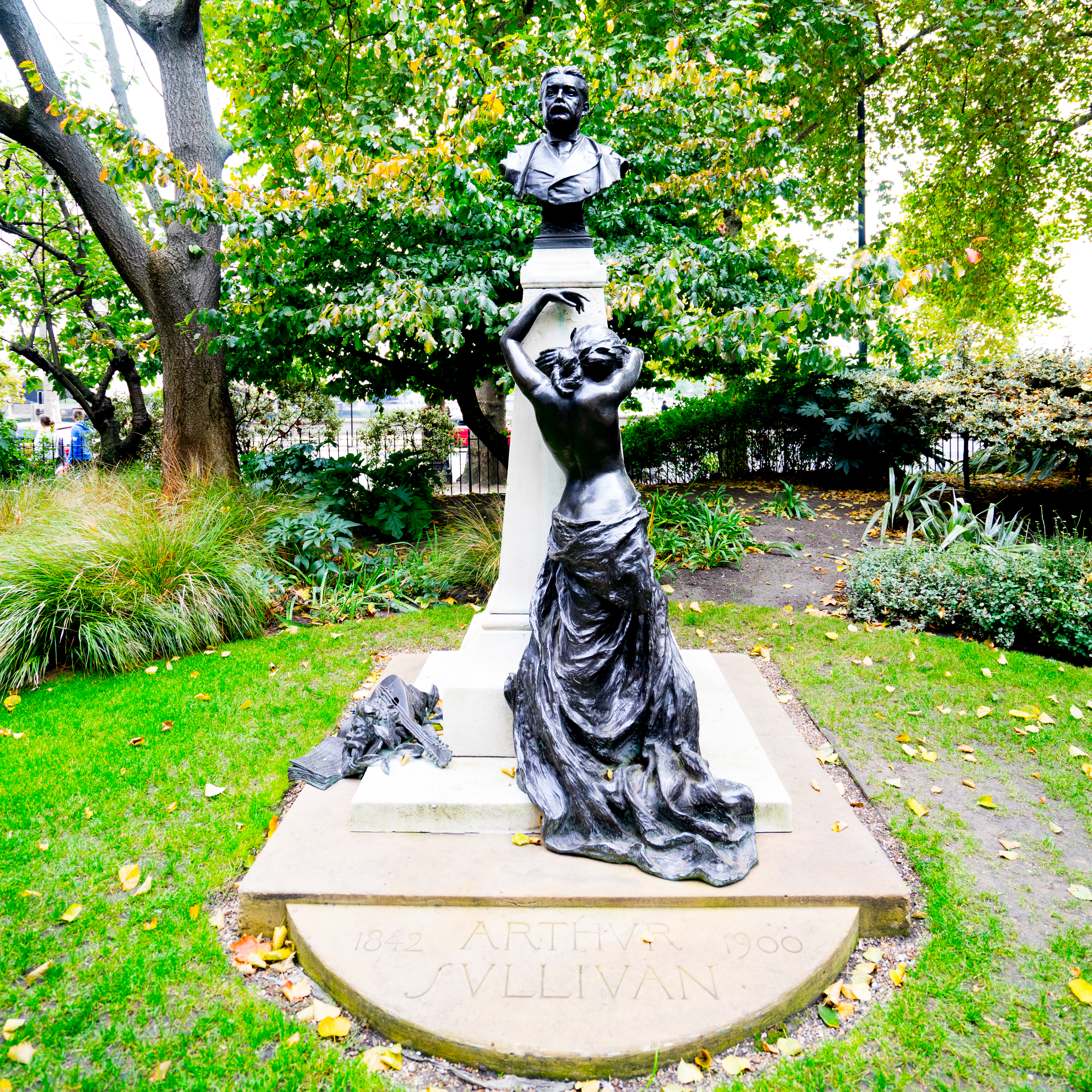
Memorial to Sir Arthur Sullivan, Victoria Embankment Gardens London

The text of the Boer War Te Deum is as follows:

We praise Thee, O God: we acknowledge Thee to be the Lord.
All the earth doth worship Thee: the Father everlasting.
To Thee all Angels cry aloud: the Heavens, and all the Powers therein.
To Thee Cherubin, and Seraphin: continually do cry,
Holy, Holy, Holy: Lord God of Sabaoth;
Heaven and earth are full of the Majesty: of Thy Glory.

The glorious company of the Apostles praise Thee.
The noble army of Martyrs: praise Thee.
The holy Church throughout all the world: doth acknowledge Thee;
The Father: of an infinite Majesty;
Thine honourable, true: and only Son.
Also the Holy Ghost: the Comforter.
Thou art the King of Glory: O Christ.
Thou art the everlasting Son: of the Father.

When Thou tookest upon Thee to deliver man: Thou didst not abhor the Virgin's womb.
When Thou hadst overcome the sharpness of death: Thou didst open the Kingdom of Heaven to all believers.
Thou sittest at the right hand of God: in the Glory of the Father.

We believe that Thou shalt come: to be our Judge.
We therefore pray Thee, help Thy servants: whom Thou hast redeemed with Thy precious blood.
Make them to be numbered with Thy Saints: in glory everlasting.
O Lord, save Thy people: and bless Thine heritage.
Govern them: and lift them up for ever.

Day by day: we magnify Thee;
And we worship Thy Name: ever world without end.
Vouchsafe, O Lord: to keep us this day without sin.
O Lord, have mercy upon us: have mercy upon us.
O Lord, let Thy mercy lighten upon us: as our trust is in Thee.
O Lord, in Thee have I trusted: let me never be confounded.
