= Symphony No. 2 (Arnold) =

Symphony by Malcolm Arnold

EMI recording of Malcolm Arnold's Symphonies Nos 1, 2 & 5, pictures the composer conducting Symphony No. 2

The Symphony No. 2, Op. 40 by Malcolm Arnold is a symphony dating from 1953. Arnold composed the symphony on commission from the Bournemouth Winter Garden's Society. He dedicated the score to the Bournemouth Symphony Orchestra and conductor Charles Groves, who premiered the work on 25 May 1953.

The work is in four movements:

1. Allegretto
2. Vivace
3. Lento
4. Allegro con brio

Commentators such as Donald Mitchell and Christopher Stasiak have noted Arnold's use of what they characterise as "Mahlerian clichés", or Mahlerian style and construction, in this symphony. By contrast, Hugo Cole observed that it is "a startlingly original work... bold enough to flout 'the spirit of the age' so outrageously."

== Notable performances ==
- First performance: 25 May 1953 by the Bournemouth Symphony Orchestra conducted by Charles Groves
- London premiere: 3 June 1953 by the London Philharmonic Orchestra conducted by the composer
- First broadcast: 9 February 1954 by the BBC Scottish Symphony Orchestra conducted by Alexander Gibson on the BBC Third Programme
- BBC Proms premiere: 8 August 1956 by the BBC Symphony Orchestra conducted by the composer

== Commercial recordings ==
- 1955 Malcolm Arnold and the Royal Philharmonic Orchestra on Philips Records NBL5021 (re-released on EMI 382 1462 (Conducted by the composer))
- 1976 Charles Groves and the Bournemouth Symphony Orchestra on EMI Classics His Master's Voice ASD 3353 (LP) CDM 566324-2 (CD) (Recorded by the dedicatee)
- 1994: Vernon Handley and the Royal Philharmonic Orchestra on Conifer 75605-51240-2 (re-released on Decca 4765337)
- 1995: Richard Hickox and the London Symphony Orchestra on Chandos Records CHAN 9335
- 1996: Andrew Penny and the RTÉ National Symphony Orchestra on Naxos Records 8.553406 (recorded 10–11 April 1995, in the presence of the composer)
- 2021: Barry Wordsworth and the BBC Concert Orchestra on BBC Music Magazine V29N7 (recorded 13 Oct 2019)
