= Dominic Seldis =

British music academic

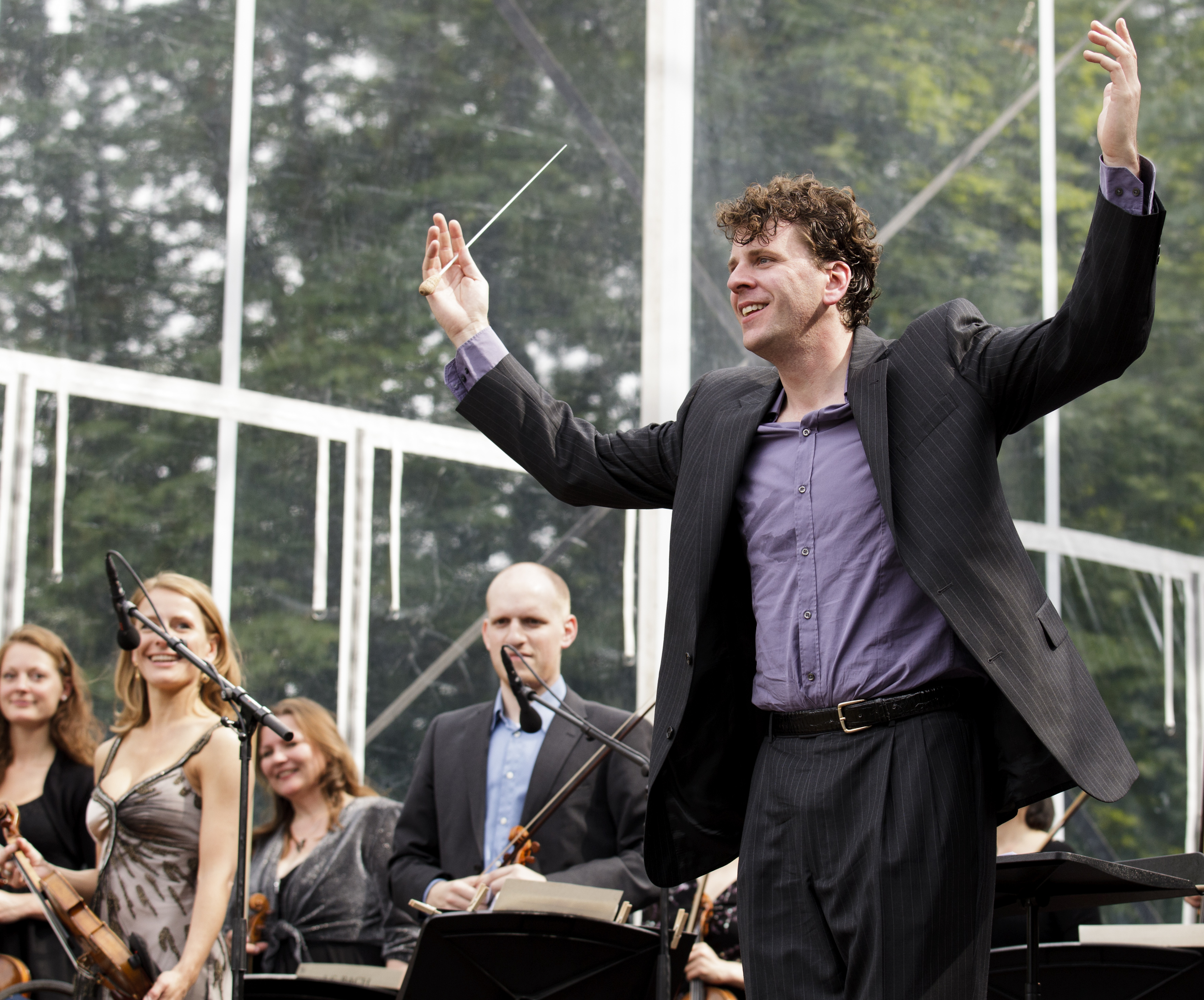
- Seldis (2011)
- Born: July 22, 1971 (age 54); Bury St Edmunds, Suffolk, UK
- Occupations: Musician, tv personality, teacher

Dominic Seldis (born 1971 in Bury St. Edmunds, Suffolk) is a British double bass soloist and principal (1st solo) double bass of the Royal Concertgebouw Orchestra.

== Biography ==
Dominic Max Seldis is the second son of Raymond Max Seldis by his marriage to Lynda Holmes.

Seldis attended Chetham's School of Music in Manchester, from 1979 to 1989. He began as a violinist and changed to the double bass aged 14, studying with Duncan McTier. In 1989, he attended the Royal Academy of Music in London, studying the double bass with Robin McGee. In 1992 he moved to Salzburg to study with Klaus Stoll at the Mozarteum.

As a soloist he has performed with the London Symphony Orchestra, the Philharmonia Orchestra, Royal Philharmonic Orchestra, London Sinfonietta, Academy of St. Martin in the Fields, the Orchestra of St. Johns Smith Square and the BBC National Orchestra of Wales and is an active chamber music player and performs many recitals with James Pearson. He is also a regular member of the John Wilson Orchestra. He has appeared many times on Dutch television as soloist including playing at the Gouden Televizierring Gala in October 2017.

In 1998 he was appointed principal player of the BBC National Orchestra of Wales and in 2008 moved to the Netherlands to become principal (1st solo) double bass of the Royal Concertgebouw Orchestra in Amsterdam.

He is a professor at the Royal Academy of Music in London, and gives regular master classes throughout the world.

== Television ==
In 2008, Seldis was a judge on the BBC Two television series Maestro. In 2012 he appeared again as a judge on Maestro at the Opera, a three-part series which opened on BBC Two on 4 May 2012. In December 2012, Seldis was a judge on the first Dutch series of Maestro, returning in every season ever since (until season 8, as of February 2026). He also appeared on Het Orkest van Nederland ("The Orchestra of the Netherlands"), as a co-host, on Dutch channel RTL 4 in winter 2014. In 2017 he hosted his own show 'De Nieuwe Stradivarius' for NPO 2.
