= Suffolk Sinfonia =

The Suffolk Sinfonia is an English symphony orchestra based at Bury St Edmunds in Suffolk. It prides itself on being the local symphony orchestra in Bury St Edmunds and performs three concerts a year in The Apex.

The orchestra was formed in autumn 1998 and is currently led by the resident conductor, Neil Carlson.
