= Cello Concerto (Sullivan) =

Concerto by Arthur Sullivan

Title page of early copy of cello part

The Cello Concerto in D major is Arthur Sullivan's only concerto and was one of his earliest large-scale works. It was written for the Italian cellist Alfredo Piatti and premiered on 24 November 1866 at the Crystal Palace, London, with August Manns conducting. After this, it was performed only a few times. The score was not published, and the manuscript was destroyed in a fire in the 1960s, but the full score was reconstructed by the conductors Sir Charles Mackerras and David Mackie in the 1980s. Their version was premiered and published in 1986.

The work is rarely heard in the concert hall, but it has been recorded by EMI Classics and others. There are three movements: Allegro moderato; Andante espressivo; and Finale: molto vivace.

== Background and 19th-century performances ==
Sullivan embarked on his composing career in the 1860s with a series of ambitious works, interspersed with hymns, parlour songs and other light pieces. At the concert at which the twenty-three-year-old Sullivan's Irish Symphony was first performed in April 1866, the Italian cellist Alfredo Piatti played the Schumann Cello Concerto. Piatti's playing prompted Sullivan to compose a new concerto for him.

The concerto was first performed on 24 November 1866 at the Crystal Palace, London, with August Manns conducting. Reviewing the first performance, The Times called the work not a concerto, but a concertino, and although the paper looked forward to further performances, it added, "meanwhile we warn Mr. Sullivan that the present hopes of musical England rest in him". There were few cello concertos in the repertoire in the 1860s. Those by Dvořák (1895), Saint-Saëns (1872 and 1902), Elgar (1919) and Shostakovich (1959 and 1966) were yet to come; concertos from earlier centuries such as those of Vivaldi and Haydn had fallen into neglect. Even the Schumann, composed sixteen years before Sullivan's, was far from a regular repertoire piece at the time. (Note: The Musical Times, reviewing the performance by Piatti at the April 1866 concert said of the concerto that "not having been put into the fire by the composer, [it] should have been duly placed there by his admirers".) Nonetheless, there were only two more complete performances of Sullivan's concerto during his lifetime. Piatti played the work in Edinburgh on 17 December 1866, and there was an amateur performance in London in February 1887. The first two movements were played at a Covent Garden promenade concert in October 1873, conducted by the composer, with Walter Pettit as soloist. Sullivan's biographer Arthur Jacobs considers it remarkable that the work fell into neglect, surmising that Sullivan or Piatti, or both, decided that it was unsatisfactory, possibly because of the brevity of the first movement.

== 20th-century performances; reconstruction ==
In the early twentieth century there was a single performance by the soloist May Mukle with the Bournemouth Municipal Orchestra conducted by Dan Godfrey; after that the work was not heard again until the final performance of the original score, given by William Pleeth and the Goldsbrough Orchestra conducted by Charles Mackerras in a concert for the BBC Third Programme, broadcast live on 7 July 1953. (Note: The first movement cadenza for this performance was written by Mackerras, as there had been some doubt about the authenticity of the existing cadenza.)

The concerto was not published, and in May 1964 the manuscript score and orchestral parts were destroyed in a fire at the publishers, Chappell & Co. A copy of the solo part, with indications of some orchestral cues survived, as part of the Pierpont Morgan Collection. Working from this, from his own memory and from a second cued soloist's copy Mackerras made a reconstruction of the concerto in the 1980s, in close collaboration with the conductor and Sullivan specialist David Mackie. Mackerras filled in what he could not remember of the orchestral parts, "based on his knowledge of Sullivan, and also of Mendelssohn and Schubert (both of whom Sullivan often imitated in his early works)". The reconstructed work was given at a London Symphony Orchestra concert at the Barbican, London, on 20 April 1986. Julian Lloyd Webber was the soloist, and Mackerras conducted. The same performers recorded the work for EMI Classics immediately afterwards. The work was recorded again in 1993 by Martin Ostertag with the Southwest German Radio Symphony Orchestra conducted by Klaus Arp, and in 2000 by Paul Watkins with the BBC Symphony Orchestra and Mackerras.

The reconstructed score was published by Josef Weinberger, London, in 1986. A piano reduction by Mackie was published at the same time.

== Music ==
The concerto has three movements:

1. Allegro moderato
2. Andante espressivo
3. Finale: molto vivace

The proportions of the concerto are unusual: the first movement – customarily the longest and most symphonically structured movement of a concerto – plays for only three and a half minutes. The other two movements run about seven minutes each. Using the notes of the tonic triad (D, F♯ and A), the Allegro opens with a burst of energy, but after seventy-five bars it "simply fades out just when one is expecting the second subject". It segues into the next movement, by way of a brief cadenza.

The slow movement, a sweetly songful andante, was praised at the time of the premiere, and it was suggested that it should be transcribed for church organ. The gentle mood makes way, halfway through the movement, for a few assertive strophic bars before the mild andante theme returns. The reviewer for The Observer wrote, after the first performance, that the main theme of the movement was "as purely beautiful a melody as anything written for the instrument".

The finale returns to the energetic vein of the opening of the concerto, in what the conductor Tom Higgins calls "an extraordinary burst of drive and melodic power". Once the brisk mood is established Sullivan brings back the exuberant opening theme of the concerto, before a gentler interlude followed by some energetic but not conspicuously tuneful passagework leading to a lively variant of the opening bars of the finale and, after some further bars of passagework, a conventional closing flourish.

The orchestration and the string writing for the soloist show Sullivan's habitual grasp of the capabilities of all instruments, but commentators have not found the actual themes memorable. The Gramophone review of the 1986 recording concludes: "Never does the work build up to any really satisfying effect, however much the themes may initially promise".
