= The Window (song cycle) =

Song cycle by Arthur Sullivan; words by Alfred, Lord Tennyson

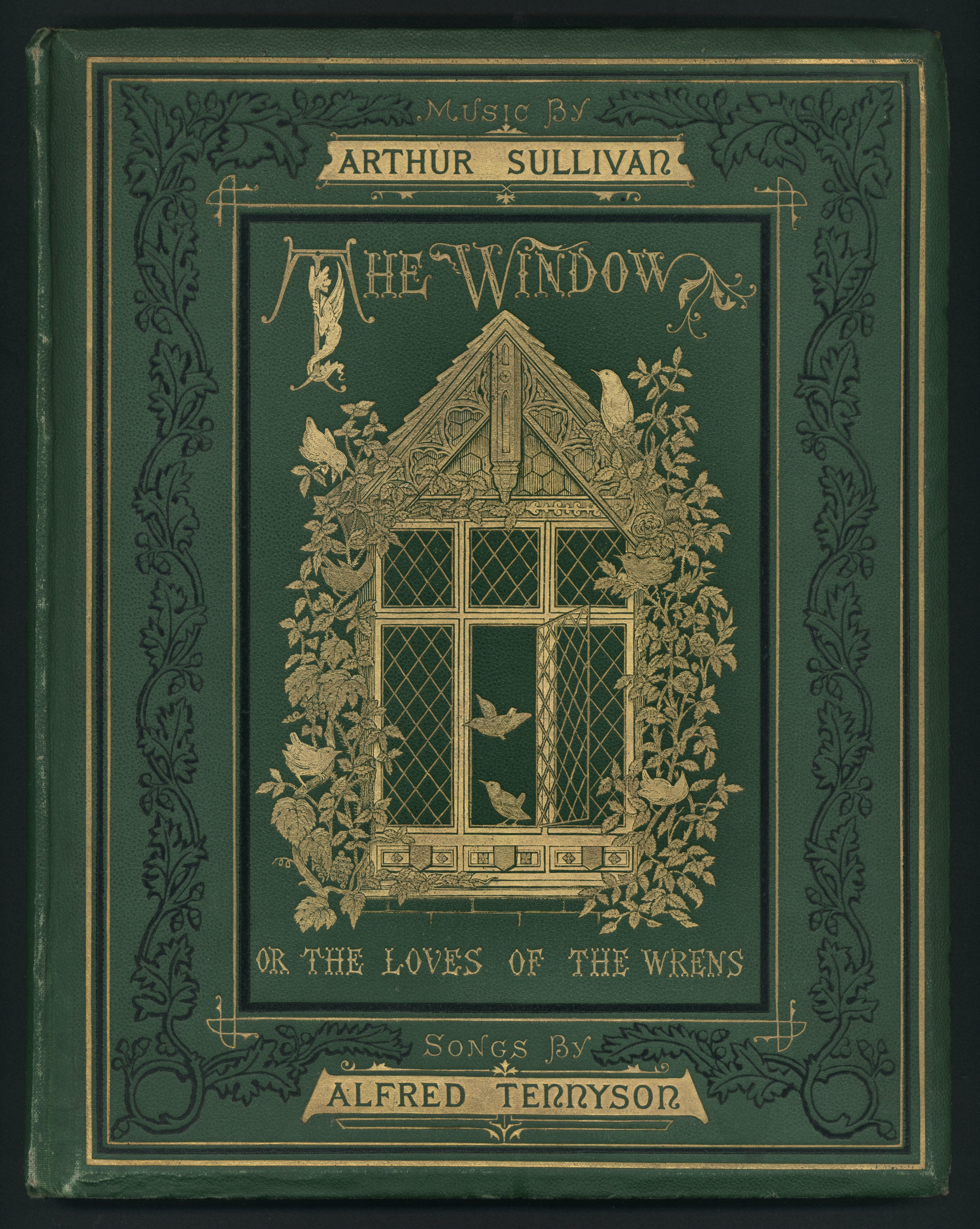
Embossed cover of the 1871 score

The Window; or, The Songs of the Wrens is a song cycle by Arthur Sullivan with words by Alfred, Lord Tennyson. The songs in the cycle tell the story of the hopes and fears of a lover over many months until his wedding day in the spring.

The cycle consists of twelve poems by Tennyson, eleven of which were set to music by Sullivan, and one illustration by John Everett Millais. Tennyson wrote the poems in 1867 but was dissatisfied with his work and reluctant to publish it. He finally relented, and it was published in 1871. On the cover of the first edition, the subtitle is given as "The Loves of the Wrens", but "Songs of the Wrens" is used on the frontispiece and is the one generally used.

== Background ==
George Grove, the secretary of The Crystal Palace, originally suggested a collaboration between Tennyson and Sullivan on a German-style song cycle, in English, but similar to Schubert's Die Schöne Müllerin. Grove was a friend of Sullivan's and an early promoter of his music. An English-language narrative song cycle, like Schubert's, was a novelty. John Everett Millais agreed to illustrate the poems for a hardbound volume. On October 17, 1866, Grove and Sullivan dined with Tennyson at his home on the Isle of Wight, where they began to discuss the piece.

By February 1867, Tennyson had a draft of the text, but Sullivan noted in a letter he wrote to his mother from Tennyson's house on February 10:

He read me all the songs (twelve in number), which are absolutely lovely, but I fear there will be a great difficulty in getting them from him. He thinks they are too light, and will damage his reputation, &c. All this I have been combating, whether successfully or not I shall be able to tell you tomorrow.

In August 1867, Tennyson had revised the words, and they were printed privately by Sir Ivor Guest. But Tennyson refused to allow publication until November 1870, when he finally agreed. By this time, however, Millais had sold the drawings he had prepared, except for one, and he was too busy to work any further on the project.

== Publication and story ==
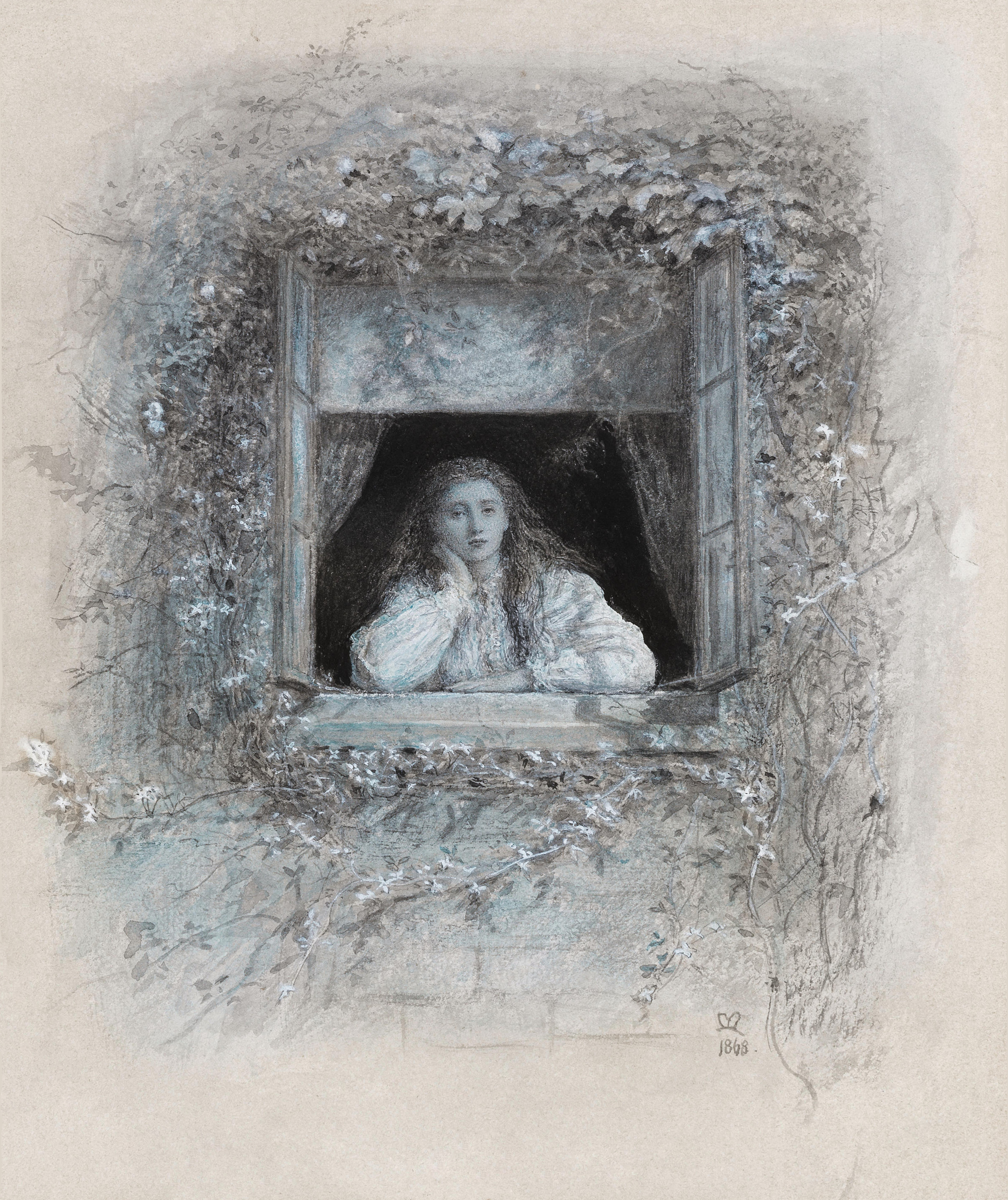
Drawing by John Everett Millais, titled "A Reverie" (1868), published in the first edition of The Window (1871)

The songs were finally published early in 1871 and included the twelve poems by Tennyson, eleven of which Sullivan had set to music for piano accompaniment, the one remaining illustration by Millais (pictured), and the following preface by Tennyson:

Four years ago Mr. Sullivan requested me to write a little song-cycle, German fashion, for him to exercise his art upon. He had been very successful in setting such old songs as "Orpheus with his Lute", and I drest up for him, partly in the old style, a puppet, whose almost only merit is, perhaps, that it can dance to Mr. Sullivan's instrument. I am sorry that my four year old puppet should have to dance at all in the dark shadow of these days [the siege of Paris in the Franco-Prussian War]; but the music is now completed, and I am bound by my promise.

The Times summarised the story told in the songs as follows:

The story that connects [the songs] is simple enough, but in the hands of such a poet the simplest story can be made to yield richly. A lover stands on the slope of a hill "when the winds are up in the morning"; he sees the sunlight flashing on the far-away window-pane of his love. [He] come[s] down to the plain; he stands under her window, and sings to the flowers that climb around it: ... "Drop me a flower, a flower, to kiss." ... [W]e follow the lover in various metres through his various moods. ...[I]n his love's absence [he] calls aloud to and defies the closing winter, which has bitten into the heart of the earth, but not into his heart; [when] spring has come, the wrens have begun to build about the window, and he sings to them of ... love. [He] ... sends a letter to his love ... he doubts and fears even while breaking the seal of her answer. But her answer is what it could only be, and [he feels] a burst of triumphant joy. ... [T]he marriage day is fixed, [and] its morning has come. He sees again the glinting of the sun upon her window, and he sings: "O, heart! are you great enough for love? ... Over the meadows and stiles, / Over the world to the end of it / Flash for a million miles."

On the cover of the 1871 edition, the subtitle is given as "The Loves of the Wrens", but "Songs of the Wrens" is used on the frontispiece and is the one generally used.

== Songs in the cycle ==
The cycle consists of 12 poems by Tennyson, of which 11 are set to music by Sullivan.

These are:

- I. On the Hill – "The Lights and Shadows fly"
- II. At the Window – "Vine, Vine and Eglantine"
- III. Gone! – "Gone ! Gone till the end of the year"
- IV. Winter – "The Frost is here, and Fuel is dear"
- V. Spring – "Birds' Love and Bird's Song"
- VI. The Letter – "Where is another Sweet as my Sweet?" (music composed to an earlier version of this song)
- VII. No Answer – "The Mist and the Rain"
- VIII. No Answer. – "Winds are loud and you are dumb"
- IX. The Answer – "Two little Hands that meet"
- IX.^{B}. Ay! – "Be merry, all birds, to-day" (Sullivan did not set this song, but it is included in the score as poetry)
- X. When? – "Sun comes, Moon comes, Time slips away"
- XI. Marriage Morning – "Light so low upon Earth"

== Reaction ==
A prepublication review of the volume in The Times states:

At the head of the Christmas books we must place The Window. ... What more can heart wish than Alfred Tennyson's verse and Arthur Sullivan's music? What more can eye desire than the rich yet tasteful emblazonment which makes the casket worthy of the jewels it contains? ... Mr. Sullivan's music is [of] perfect melody, but rescued from monotony by a richness of harmony and variety of accompaniment rare indeed, at least in English song, it is suited to the words and they to it, and both are worthy the reputation of the first song-writer and the first song-setter of the day.

== Recordings ==
The song cycle was recorded in 1989 by Peter Allanson (baritone) and Stephen Betteridge (piano) on Symposium, 1074, as part of their recording, An Album of Victorian Song. Baritone Francis Loring and pianist Paul Hamburger included the cycle in their album "Sullivan Songs" (1980). It is also part of the 2017 Chandos Records collection Songs, which includes 35 other Sullivan songs, sung by tenor Ben Johnson; David Owen Norris accompanies.
