= The Prodigal Son (Sullivan) =

Oratorio by Arthur Sullivan

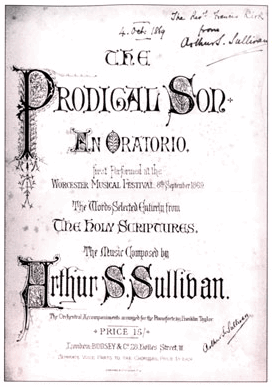
Signed cover of vocal score

The Prodigal Son is an oratorio by Arthur Sullivan with text taken from the parable of the same name in the Gospel of Luke. It features chorus with soprano, contralto, tenor and bass solos. It premiered in Worcester Cathedral on 10 September 1869 as part of the Three Choirs Festival.

The work was Sullivan's first oratorio, and it was the first sacred music setting of this parable, preceding Claude Debussy's 1884 cantata L'enfant prodigue and Sergei Prokofiev's 1929 ballet The Prodigal Son, Op. 46.

== Background ==
Sullivan was still in his 20s when he composed this piece, which, like many of Sullivan's early works, shows the strong musical influence of Felix Mendelssohn. A rising star of British music, he had already produced his popular incidental music to Shakespeare's The Tempest, his Irish Symphony, a Cello concerto, his Overture in C, "In Memoriam", The Masque at Kenilworth, his first ballet, L'Île Enchantée and two comic operas, Cox and Box and The Contrabandista, as well as other orchestral pieces and numerous hymns and songs. Therefore, it was no surprise when Sullivan received a commission to compose an oratorio for the Three Choirs Festival.

In the Victorian era, large-scale choral works with orchestra were a staple of British musical culture, including oratorios in the mould of Handel and Mendelssohn. Except for theatre pieces, choral works were the only genre in which Sullivan continued to compose regularly after the early 1870s.

=== Composition ===
Sullivan chose his own text for The Prodigal Son from the gospel of St. Luke and other appropriate books of the bible. Sullivan composed the music in about three weeks. Rachel Scott Russell, a woman with whom Sullivan was having an affair at the time, copied the music.

Sullivan does not change the story much, but he omits the episode in which the elder son questions the mercy shown to the prodigal son. In his preface to the work, Sullivan justifies this on the grounds that the episode has no dramatic connection with the story. Instead, Sullivan focuses his libretto on the story of the son and his father, leading to the dramatic reconciliation between the two. His preface states his concept of the title character:

"...the Prodigal himself has been conceived, not as of a naturally brutish and depraved disposition - a view taken by many commentators with apparently little knowledge of human nature, and no recollection of their own youthful impulses; but rather as a buoyant, restless youth, tired of the monotony of home, and anxious to see what lay beyond the narrow confines of his father's farm, going forth in the confidence of his own simplicity and ardour, and led gradually away into follies and sins which, at the outset, would have been as distasteful as they were strange to him."

=== Performance and reception ===
The first performance of the piece was a great success and featured soloists Thérèse Tietjens, Zelia Trebelli, Sims Reeves and Charles Santley; Sullivan conducted. After the premiere, an additional performance was scheduled for 18 December 1869 at The Crystal Palace. The performance was rescheduled for 11 December 1869 because Sims Reeves was unable to make the performance date. Reeves missed the rescheduled performance and was replaced by Mr. Perren, while Mlle. Vanzini substituted for Titiens. Sullivan's former teacher, Sir John Goss, attended this performance and cautioned his student:

"All you have done is most masterly — your orchestration superb, and your effects many of them original and first-rate.... Some day you will, I hope, try another oratorio, putting out all your strength, but not the strength of a few weeks or months, whatever your immediate friends may say... only don't do anything so pretentious as an oratorio or even a symphony without all your power, which seldom comes in one fit."

In 1870, there was a performance of The Prodigal Son in Manchester, and it was repeated at the Three Choirs Festival at Hereford in September. In November 1870, it was performed in Edinburgh, with Sullivan conducting. During Sullivan's visit to New York City to supervise the premiere of The Pirates of Penzance, he conducted a performance on 23 November 1879 by the Handel and Haydn Society in Boston. In 1885, the Canadian premiere took place in London, Ontario.

The piece continued in the standard choral repertory until World War I. One modern critic wrote, "Even at the young age of 27, Sullivan's scoring has uncommon freshness and accuracy, particularly his writing for winds, and there's a marvelous "Revel" chorus accompanied throughout by snare drum that texturally speaking recalls early Verdi, though the scoring for piccolo and contrabassoon is pure Sullivan. At almost exactly an hour in length, The Prodigal Son deserves to return to the repertoire of choral societies...." In his 1971 biography, Percy Young wrote:

"The Prodigal Son, as Goss suggests, betrays a lack of commitment.... But there are a number of places where the music comes to life, often stimulated by fine details of orchestration.... In 'They went astray' there is some splendidly dramatic writing in gaunt canon – first for soprano and bass, and then for alto and tenor – against an empty orchestral background. Here Sullivan is at his most economical and his most effective, and way ahead of his British contemporaries."

== Musical numbers ==
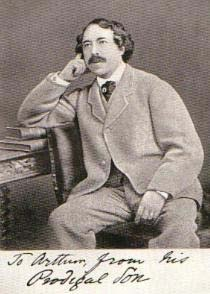
Sims Reeves, who created the title character

- No. 1. Introduction
- No. 2. Chorus: There is joy
- No. 3. Tenor solo: A certain man had two sons
- No. 4. bass recitative and Aria: My son, attend to my words
- No. 5. Soprano recitative: And the younger son
- No. 6. Tenor solo and chorus: Let us eat and drink
- No. 7. Contralto recitative and chorus: Woe unto them
- No. 8. Contralto aria: Love not the world
- No. 9. Soprano recitative: And when he had spent all
- No. 10. Soprano aria: O that thou hadst hearkened
- No. 11. Tenor aria: How many hired servants
- No. 12. Chorus: There is joy
- No. 13. Soprano recitative: And he arose... Tenor and bass duet: Father, I have sinned
- No. 14. Bass recitative and aria: Bring forth the best robe
- No. 15. Chorus: O that men would praise the Lord
- No. 16. Tenor recitative: No chastening for the present... Aria: Come, ye children
- No. 17. Unaccompanied quartet: The Lord is nigh
- No. 18. Chorus: Thou, O Lord, art our Father

== Recordings ==
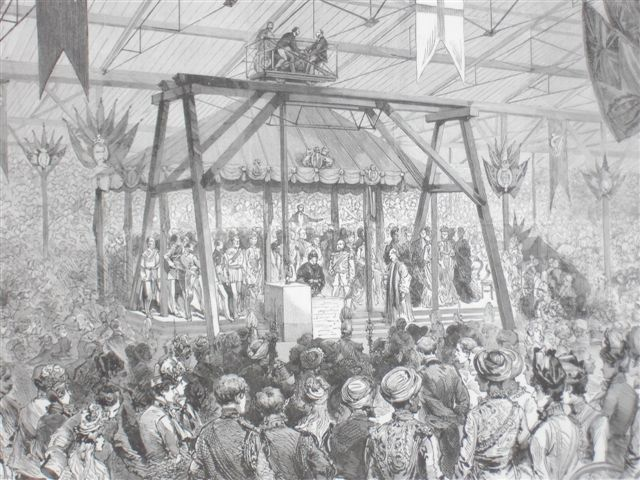
Sullivan conducts the Imperial Ode as Queen Victoria lays the foundation stone, 1887

A 2003 recording was made by Hyperion Records and the New London Orchestra with Ronald Corp conducting. Soloists are Catherine Denley (mezzo-soprano), Clare Rutter (soprano), Gary Magee (baritone), and Mark Wilde (tenor), with The London Chorus. Sullivan's Boer War Te Deum is included on the disc. The Sir Arthur Sullivan Society issued a recording of The Prodigal Son on cassette tape in 1995. Also on the recording is Sullivan's Imperial Ode (1887) and his 1895 incidental music to King Arthur. The recording is performed by Imperial Opera, with Michael Withers and Robert Dean conducting.

Other individual songs from the piece have been recorded.
