= Martin Ostertag =

Martin Ostertag (born in 1943) is a German classical cellist and music educator.

== Life ==
Born in Lörrach, Ostertag studied cello with Leo Koscielny at the Hochschule für Musik Karlsruhe and with André Navarra in Paris. In 1967 he was a prizewinner of the international competition in Vienna, and in 1968/69 he won the national selection of the Deutscher Musikrat Konzert junger Künstler. Afterwards he was first solo cellist of the Deutsche Oper am Rhein, the Amati Ensemble Berlin, the orchestra of the Deutsche Oper Berlin and finally from 1974 of the SWR Symphony Orchestra Baden-Baden and Freiburg. He undertook numerous concert tours and gab master classes in Argentina, Brazil, Canada, Germany, Finland, Italy and Japan. Since 1980 he has taught at the Karlsruhe Music Academy.

Together with Nicolas Chumachenco, Erika Geldsetzer and Benjamin Rivinius, Ostertag founded the Villa Musica String Quartet, with whom he won two ECHO Klassik prizes for recordings of Mozart's String quartets. His recordings of Bach's Cello Suites and Schumann's late pieces for cello and piano also received international acclaim. Ostertag plays an instrument from the workshop of Pietro Guarneri.
