= Charles Groves =

British conductor

Charles Groves

Sir Charles Barnard Groves CBE (10 March 1915 – 20 June 1992) was an English conductor. He was known for the breadth of his repertoire and for encouraging contemporary composers and young conductors.

After accompanying positions and conducting various orchestras and studio work for the BBC, Groves spent a decade as conductor of the Bournemouth Symphony Orchestra. His best-known musical directorship was of the Royal Liverpool Philharmonic Orchestra, beginning in 1963, with which he made most of his recordings. From 1967 until his death, Groves was associate conductor of the Royal Philharmonic Orchestra, and in the 1970s he was one of the regular conductors of the Last Night of the Proms. He also served as president of the National Youth Orchestra from 1977, and, during the last decade of his life, as guest conductor for orchestras around the world.

== Life and career ==
=== Early years ===
Groves was born in London, the only child of Frederick Groves and Annie (née Whitehead). He was a pupil at St Paul's Cathedral School (where a house is now named after him), singing in the Cathedral choir and, from the age of 13, studying the piano and organ. Music was already important to him as a solace, as he was orphaned at the age of ten – his father having died in 1921 from injuries received in World War I and his mother having died four years later. From 1930 until 1932 he was a pupil at Sutton Valence School, in Kent, where Groves Hall is named in honour of him. After leaving Sutton Valence School he attended the Royal College of Music. There, his main studies were in lieder and accompanying, but he became involved in student opera productions as a répétiteur. He was naturally gifted with great fluency and the ability to sight read almost any music, but confessed, years later, to having been lazy about his piano studies, and he abandoned his ambitions to become a concert pianist. He played in the percussion section for Vaughan Williams's Hugh the Drover and Delius's A Village Romeo and Juliet when Sir Thomas Beecham performed as guest conductor at the college. Groves also went into the conducting class, but did not progress beyond the third orchestra. In 1937, while still a student, he accompanied choral rehearsals of Brahms's German Requiem, Verdi's Requiem and Beethoven's Missa Solemnis under Arturo Toscanini.

Groves began his professional career as a freelance accompanist, including work for the BBC. In 1938, he was appointed chorus master of the BBC Music Productions Unit under the direction of Stanford Robinson, where he worked on broadcast opera productions. At the outbreak of the Second World War, Groves was sent to Evesham, and later Bedford, England, to be resident chorus master for the BBC while it was evacuated from London. In 1943, he was invited to take charge of the BBC Revue Orchestra, playing mostly light music. During this time Groves conducted Weill's Lady in the Dark with Gertrude Lawrence in the lead role.

=== Conducting posts ===
Groves was conductor for the BBC Northern Orchestra in Manchester from 1944 to 1951, conducting several studio concerts every week, and thereby acquiring an exceptionally large repertoire. While in Manchester he met a BBC colleague, Hilary Barchard, whom he married in 1948. Feeling the need to move from studio-based work, Groves accepted the conductorship of the Bournemouth Symphony Orchestra from 1951 to 1961, which he conducted about 150 times each year. When financial difficulties led to a proposal to merge the Bournemouth and Birmingham orchestras, Groves supported the alternative proposition by which the Bournemouth orchestra took on the additional role of resident orchestra for the new Welsh National Opera, of which he became musical director from 1961 to 1963. Groves did much to establish that company's choral and orchestral traditions and conducted many performances of works then seldom staged, such as Verdi's I Lombardi and The Sicilian Vespers, which won critical acclaim and were brought to London.

Groves is probably best known for his long tenure from 1963 to 1977 as music director and principal conductor of the Royal Liverpool Philharmonic Orchestra, conducting, as he said, "everything from the St John Passion to Messiaen and Stockhausen". He spent nine months of every year with the RLPO, where he greatly improved standards of playing. In the other three months he guest conducted concerts and operas in London and overseas. He took the RLPO on highly acclaimed tours of Germany and Switzerland in 1966 and 1968, and Poland in 1970. During his time in Liverpool, Groves instituted a series of seminars for young conductors, and those who made early appearances there included Andrew Davis, Mark Elder, John Eliot Gardiner, James Judd and Barry Wordsworth. At one seminar Groves noted the presence in the orchestra, as an extra percussion player, of a teenager named Simon Rattle.

From 1967 until his death, Groves was associate conductor of the Royal Philharmonic Orchestra, which he led on a tour of the US In the 1970s he was one of the regular conductors of the Last Night of the Proms (others being Norman Del Mar and James Loughran).

Groves was music director of the English National Opera in 1978–1979, but in spite of a well-received and rare revival of Weber's Euryanthe the appointment did not prove a success, and he relinquished the post the following year. He found combining administration with conducting too stressful for him. Groves also served as president of the National Youth Orchestra (1977–1992) and, especially during the last decade of his career, as guest conductor for numerous orchestras around the world. In 1984, he joined the English Sinfonia as president and artistic adviser, later also becoming principal conductor of the Guildford Philharmonic (1987) and music director of the Leeds Philharmonic Society (1988).

=== Repertoire ===
Groves was particularly noted for his assured conducting of large-scale works and was the first conductor to direct a complete cycle of Gustav Mahler's symphonies in Britain. He was also famous for encouraging modern composers, and he frequently included their works in his programmes. Groves conducted a wide repertory, refusing to concentrate on any particular subgenre. He remarked, "I feel myself a GP [general practitioner] rather than a consultant." Nevertheless, he became particularly known as a champion of British composers and invariably offered British works in his programmes when touring abroad. His large British repertoire included the works of Malcolm Arnold, Arthur Bliss, Havergal Brian, Frank Bridge, Benjamin Britten, George Butterworth, Eric Coates, Frederick Delius, Edward Elgar, Alexander Goehr, Alun Hoddinott, Gustav Holst, George Lloyd, William Mathias, Michael Tippett, Thea Musgrave, Peter Maxwell Davies, Arthur Sullivan, Ralph Vaughan Williams and William Walton.

Groves was noted for adding adventurous new works to the repertory of his orchestras. The composer Oliver Knussen said, "He managed to get the respect of the players and the affection of performers. He had an exemplary attitude and track record with regard to contemporary music. His policy of presenting second performances as well as first was selfless and idealistic." Groves's premières included works by Lennox Berkeley, David Blake, Justin Connolly. Arnold Cooke, Gordon Crosse, Jonathan Harvey, Robin Holloway, Daniel Jones, John McCabe, Priaulx Rainier, Edwin Roxburgh, Edmund Rubbra, Giles Swayne and Hugh Wood.

=== Honours and personal life ===
Groves received many honours for his musical work, including being appointed an Officer of the Order of the British Empire (OBE) in 1958, a Commander of the Order (CBE) in 1968, and receiving a knighthood in 1973. He received doctorates from four universities, was made a freeman of the City of London in 1976 and elected an honorary member of the Royal Philharmonic Society in 1990. He was appointed Companion of the Royal Northern College of Music (whose council he chaired from 1973 to 1990, and where a building is named in his honour) and a Fellow of the Royal College of Music, the Guildhall School of Music and Drama, Trinity College of Music, and the London College of Music, and was an honorary member of the Royal Academy of Music. The "Making Music Sir Charles Groves Prize" is a national award, named in his honour, given to an individual or organisation making an outstanding contribution to British music. Peter Maxwell Davies wrote Sir Charles: his Pavane as a tribute to Groves's memory.

Away from the concert hall, Groves was a connoisseur of English literature and also a keen sports fan. When young he played rugby "in the Wasps F team", as he self-deprecatingly put it, and as a cricketer was "a wily slow bowler". Charles and Hilary Groves had three children, Sally, Mary and Jonathan, the first and last of whom entered the musical profession. Charles Groves suffered a heart attack early in 1992 and died in London, four months later, at the age of 77. A memorial stone to his memory was placed in St Paul's Cathedral.

== Recordings ==
Although the record companies tended to regard Groves as a specialist in British music, he made recordings of German, French and Russian music including Beethoven (Symphony No 4 and Symphony No 6); Fauré (Masques et bergamasques and Pavane); Haydn (Symphony No 92, Oxford, Symphony No 104, London); Ravel (Pavane pour une infante défunte); Satie (Gymnopédies) and Tchaikovsky (Variations on a Rococo Theme (with Paul Tortelier, cello)). He also recorded Dvorak's Sixth Symphony and Sibelius's incidental music to The Tempest.

British music recorded by Groves includes Arnold (Symphony No 2); Bliss (A Colour Symphony, Morning Heroes); Brian (Symphonies 8 & 9); Bridge (Enter Spring, The Sea, Summer); Britten (Variations on a Theme of Frank Bridge); Butterworth (The Banks of Green Willow ); Delius (Koanga, A Mass of Life, On hearing the first cuckoo in Spring); Elgar (Caractacus, Cello Concerto (Paul Tortelier, cello), Chanson de matin, Chanson de nuit, Crown of India Suite, Enigma Variations, The Light of Life, Nursery Suite, Serenade for Strings, Severn Suite, Violin Concerto (Hugh Bean, violin)); Holst (Choral Symphony, The Planets, St. Paul's Suite); Sullivan (Overture Di Ballo, Overtures to Savoy Operas, Symphony in E (Irish)); Tippett (Fantasia concertante on a Theme of Corelli); Vaughan Williams (Fantasia on a Theme by Thomas Tallis, Hugh the Drover); Walton (Capriccio burlesco, Crown Imperial, Hamlet Funeral March, Johannesburg Festival Overture, Orb and Sceptre, Richard III Prelude and Suite, Scapino, Spitfire Prelude & Fugue); and Warlock (Capriol Suite).

== Notes ==
Cultural offices
Preceded by Rudolf Schwarz	Principal Conductor, Bournemouth Symphony Orchestra; 1951–1961	Succeeded by Constantin Silvestri
Preceded by Sir Charles Mackerras	Music Director, English National Opera; 1978–1979	Succeeded by Mark Elder
