= I Will Mention the Loving-kindnesses =

Anthem for Easter by Arthur Sullivan

- Anthem by Arthur Sullivan
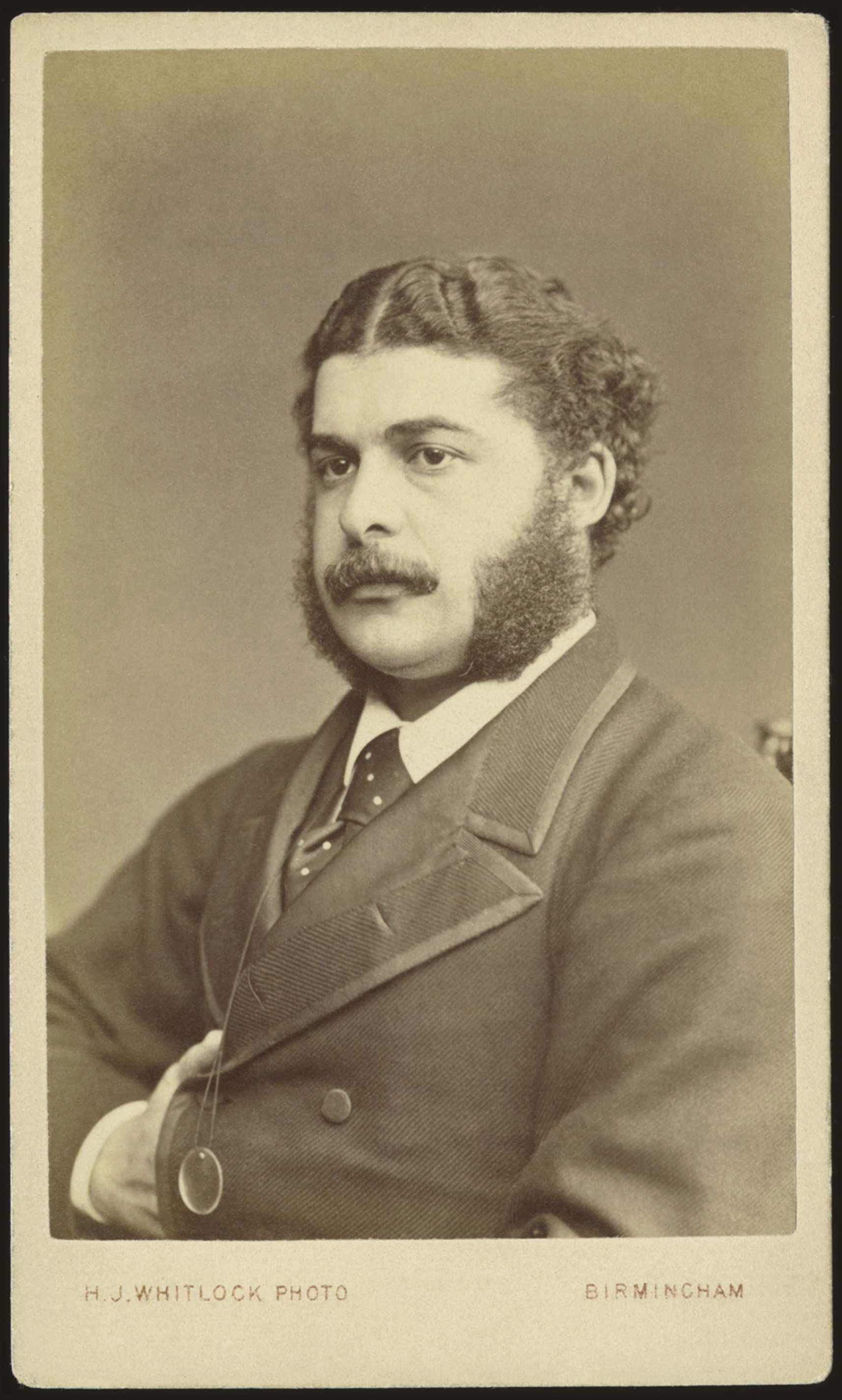
- The composer in 1870
- Occasion: Easter
- Text: Isaiah 63:7-9, 14-16
- Language: English
- Dedication: John Stainer
- Published: 1875
- Scoring: tenor; SATB choir; organ

I Will Mention the Loving-kindnesses is an anthem for Easter by Arthur Sullivan. The text is taken from the Book of Isaiah, scored for solo tenor, mixed choir and organ. It was published by Novello in 1875, dedicated to John Stainer.

== History ==
Sullivan was a boy chorister at the Chapel Royal from 1854 to 1857. There, he began to write anthems and songs. He then studied at the Royal Academy of Music and the Musikhochschule Leipzig, returning to England in 1861. From 1861 to 1872, while beginning his professional composing career, he worked as a church organist at two fashionable London churches: St. Michael's Church, Chester Square, Pimlico, and St. Peter's, Cranley Gardens, Kensington. Between 1861 and 1875, Sullivan composed a wide range of music, including incidental music for plays, a ballet, a symphony, a cello concerto, concert overtures, a cantata, an oratorio, several operettas, a song cycle, and numerous hymns, parlour ballads and other pieces.

Anthems were in demand in a period of choral revival in the second half of the 19th century, for smaller churches, rather than cathedrals, which still favoured Tudor music. Sullivan composed 16 published anthems, most of them during his work as church organist. For a text of this 1875 Easter anthem, Sullivan combined passages from Isaiah, verses 63:7-9, 14-16.

"I Will Mention the Loving-kindnesses" was published by Novello in 1875, with a dedication to Sullivan's friend, the music director John Stainer. This was the same year that Gilbert and Sullivan's first box-office success, Trial by Jury, premiered in London.

== Text and music ==
Sullivan set a text from the Old Testament which praises in general God's friendly attitude towards his people (in Hebrew: Chesed), guiding and saving them. The anthem is set for tenor solo, a four part choir and organ. It begins in G major and common time, marked Andante. After a few measures from the organ, the tenor begins with the first line, repeated with the same melody in a homophonic choral setting. This responsorial pattern is kept for several lines of the text. Then the tenor sings a longer line alone, and the choir responds with a repeat of the first line. The tenor continues with the line "So He said: Surely they are my people, children that will not lie:", and the following "So He was their Redeemer", which can be interpreted as the message of Easter, is set for the choir, singing softly in unison even long notes, with no movement even in the accompaniment. It is followed by a repetition of the first-line music from the organ.

The following text, calling to praise God, begins in the solo tenor, followed by the men's voices, and then the whole choir. It modulates to E major with a crescendo. The last section is for the choir, singing mostly in homophony, and ending with long-held chords on several Amens.
