= Peter Stark =

British conductor and teacher

Peter Stark is a British conductor. He is currently Professor of Conducting at the Royal College of Music in London and Rehearsal Director of the European Union Youth Orchestra.

== Education and early career ==
Stark studied violin and conducting at the Royal College of Music where he won the Tagore Gold Medal and the Adrian Boult Conducting Scholarship. Whilst at the RCM, he studied with Norman Del Mar and upon graduating, continued his conducting studies in Vienna with Sir Charles Mackerras.

Stark began his career in music as a principal second violinist, spending ten years as with the Welsh National Opera and two with the Royal Philharmonic Orchestra.

== Conducting career ==
During his career, he has conducted orchestras such as the London Symphony Orchestra, the Malaysian Philharmonic Orchestra, the Orchestra of the Age of Enlightenment, Hallé, Bournemouth Symphony Orchestra, BBC National Orchestra of Wales and the English Chamber Orchestra, and has worked alongside Pierre Boulez, Sir Colin Davis, Sir Mark Elder, Sir Bernard Haitink, Lord Menuhin, Sir Roger Norrington and Klaus Tennstedt.

== Teaching ==
Stark has been a Professor of Conducting at the Royal College of Music. Prior to assuming his role at the RCM, Stark held teaching positions at the Trinity College of Music and the Royal Academy of Music.

In addition to his work with the European Union Youth Orchestra he was Conductor-in-Residence for the National Youth Orchestra of Great Britain for 25 years. He is Principal Conductor of the Arabian Youth Orchestra and also conducts orchestras ranging from the Hertfordshire County Youth Orchestra (principal conductor since 1994) to the New South Wales Youth Orchestra of Australia and the Derbyshire City and County Youth Orchestra.

== Media ==
In 2008 he was appointed series consultant for the BBC TV Series Maestro, overseeing the tuition of the 'celebrity students' as well as consulting on repertoire.

== Jury Work ==
In 2021, Stark served as a jury member for two international conducting competitions. He was on the panel for the [KSO International Conducting Competition](https://www.koreansymphony.com/competition_eng/M0000056/archive.do) and also participated as a jury member in the [Khachaturian International Competition](https://khachaturian-competition.com/en/juries) (Conducting category).
