= Alan Hazeldine =

British pianist and conductor (1948-2008)

Alan Hazeldine (5 July 1948 – 10 November 2008) was a British pianist and conductor.

Hazeldine was born in Glasgow. He graduated as a pianist from the Royal Scottish Academy of Music and Drama in 1969 and went on to study conducting with Vilém Tauský at the Guildhall School of Music and Drama in London. Following a British Council scholarship he pursued further conducting studies with Konstantin Iliev in Bulgaria and with Sergiu Celibidache in Italy. He was Professor for Conducting at the Guildhall School of Music and Drama in London and worked with several orchestras including the English Chamber Orchestra, the BBC Scottish Symphony Orchestra, the Sofia Philharmonic Orchestra, conducting the first performance in Eastern Europe of the Sixth Symphony by Vaughan Williams, and was Permanent Guest Conductor of the Vratsa Symphony Orchestra. He was the founder conductor of the North London Chorus, directing over 60 concerts. In 1995 he founded the Corinthian Chamber Orchestra in London, remaining its artistic director until his death in London, aged 60, in November 2008.
