= Symphony in E (Sullivan) =

Symphony by Arthur Sullivan

The Symphony in E, first performed on 10 March 1866 in London, was the only symphony composed by Arthur Sullivan. Since Sullivan's death, it has frequently been called the Irish Symphony as it was composed in Ireland, and as a homage to Mendelssohn's Scottish Symphony.

Composed early in Sullivan's career, the piece was generally well received at its early performances and continued to be performed regularly during Sullivan's lifetime. Critics have heard echoes of Schubert, Schumann and Mendelssohn in it. Though it received few performances in the twentieth century, it has been heard more frequently in the twenty-first, and at least four recordings of the piece have been issued. The symphony has four movements and a duration of about thirty-five minutes.

== History ==
Sullivan began work on his symphony in 1863, when he was 21 years old. From holiday in northern Ireland, he wrote to his mother that "as I was jolting home ... through wind and rain on an open jaunting-car, the whole first movement of a symphony came into my head with a real Irish flavour about it – besides scraps of the other movements." The composer later wrote, "I always meant to call it the 'Irish Symphony', but I modestly refrained, as it was courting comparison with the 'Scotch Symphony'." [i.e. Mendelssohn's Symphony No 3.] The title did not appear on the published score until after Sullivan's death, in the Novello edition of 1915. Sullivan wrote in 1899 to his cousin, the music critic B. W. Findon: "Had I known that Stanford would name his work an 'Irish Symphony', I think I should have knocked my modesty on the head."

The first performance of the symphony took place at The Crystal Palace on 10 March 1866, conducted by August Manns, who had previously conducted the London première of Sullivan's incidental music to The Tempest. (Note: The advertised programme for the concert also included Beethoven's Ah! perfido sung by Euphrosyne Parepa, Weber's Jubel Overture, and his song "The Valley", sung by Charles Santley, Beethoven's Overture to Fidelio and his Fourth Symphony, and violin solos played by Carl Rosa.) The symphony had its second performance on 11 April at St James's Hall at a concert of the Musical Society of London; the conductor was Alfred Mellon. On 11 July, it was given a third performance, at what was billed as "Mr Arthur S. Sullivan's Grand Orchestral Concert". The programme consisted mainly of Sullivan's works, including the overture to The Sapphire Necklace and excerpts from The Masque at Kenilworth, conducted by the composer. Among the performers was the popular singer Jenny Lind, who co-sponsored the concert, sang four musical numbers including two Sullivan songs, and attracted a capacity audience. The same year as the premiere of his symphony, Sullivan also debuted his cello concerto and his first comic opera, Cox and Box.

The symphony was well received, though the music critics, both then and later, observed the influence of other composers. The critic in The Times wrote, after the first performance, "The symphony [is] the best musical work, if judged only by the largeness of its form and the number of beautiful thoughts it contains, for a long time produced by any English composer. ... Mr Sullivan should abjure Mendelssohn, even Beethoven and above all Schumann, for a year and a day." In his 1960 study of Sullivan's music Gervase Hughes also detects echoes of Schumann, and of Schubert as well. In a 2000 analysis, Andrew Lamb comments that the symphony predates the well known symphonies of Brahms, Tchaikovsky and Dvořák, and concurs with earlier analysts that the principal influences on Sullivan's score were Schubert, Schumann and Mendelssohn. Lamb remarks on the themes for trombones and lower strings in the second movement, which "lend the work an especial solemnity". While Lamb judges the general mood of the symphony quite serious, he finds that it "also displays Sullivan at his lightest, above all in the joyous third movement … with its jaunty theme for oboe and delightful interplay between pizzicato strings and bubbling woodwind." In 2006 the analyst Andrew Burn commented that the finale displays an early example of one of the composer's favourite devices: a melody, first heard on the oboe, is combined in counterpoint with a rhythmic theme in the first violins: "Such a device was to become a hallmark of the composer in the double choruses of his operettas".

The symphony was performed regularly during Sullivan's lifetime. It received few performances in the twentieth century, but it has been heard more frequently in recent decades and was the major work of the opening concert of the first English Music Festival (broadcast by the BBC) in October 2006. Four CD recordings of the piece have been issued, and a new study score edition has been published by a German firm, Musikproduction Jürgen Höflich

== Analysis ==
The symphony has four movements:

1. Andante – Allegro, ma non troppo vivace
2. Andante espressivo
3. Allegretto
4. Allegro vivace e con brio

It is scored for two flutes, oboe, two clarinets in A, bassoon, two horns in E, two horns in G, trumpet in E, two trombones, bass trombone, timpani, and strings. The playing time is about 35 minutes (or slightly longer if the exposition repeat is taken in the first movement).

The Andante introduction in the home key of E major in 3/4 opens with the alternation in octaves of tonic and dominant in dotted rhythm, played by the brass, answered by a 'Dresden Amen' motif on the strings (a Mendelssohnian touch). The main Allegro part of the first movement in 2/2 has divided critical opinion. In The Gramophone in 1969 Edward Greenfield commented, "The first theme in E minor may be very Mendelssohnian in shape, rhythm and key, but it provides the first real sign of Sullivan's genuine vitality of imagination," whereas Hughes considers that though sonata form is competently handled, the first subject, "a violin cantabile of soaring promise, falls to pieces at the seventh bar." The allegro switches briefly to E major before returning to and concluding in E minor.

The second movement, in B major in 3/4 is based on what Greenfield calls "a very Mendelssohnian melody" which "survives The Salvation Army treatment on horns and alto trombone in octaves, only to culminate in an outrageous crib of the second movement of Schubert's Unfinished Symphony, a phrase first on oboes and then on violins." Hughes describes the movement as lyrical, but with "a rather jejeune accompaniment".

The scherzo third movement, in C major in 2/4 with a middle episode in 3/4 has attracted the most favourable comments from critics. Hughes notes that it is not in conventional symphonic scherzo form, following instead a pattern ABCA with a short coda based on B in which Greenfield heard an astonishing similarity to the finale of Schubert's Great C major Symphony. The jaunty main theme of the movement is given to the oboe, always one of Sullivan's favoured instruments.

The finale, in E major and in a central section E♭, in 2/2 contains no unconventional features, though Greenfield comments that it brings "one of those descants (fast dotted rhythm against a conventionally soaring melody) that became one of the trademarks of the operettas".

Hughes sums the symphony up thus: "In spite of the promising first movement and a modicum of competent thematic development, the symphony cannot be counted as a satisfactory achievement. Too much of the material is machine-made – as yet we find few signs of true spontaneity." Greenfield concludes that the symphony is "a charming example of Victorian art at its least inhibited." Lamb finds that despite the serious tone of much of the work, the symphony has "an all-pervading charm" and demonstrates "a thoroughly proficient handling of the orchestra". In 2010 the Gramophone Classical Music Guide commented, "what a charmer of a work it is! Mendelssohn (and his Reformation Symphony above all) provides the dominant stylistic template, but the work is soundly constructed, effectively scored, and the scherzo’s irresistibly perky oboe tune, in particular, already reveals a very real melodic gift.

== Recordings ==
- Royal Liverpool Philharmonic Orchestra/Sir Charles Groves (EMI, 1968)
- BBC Concert Orchestra/Owain Arwel Hughes (cpo, 1993)
- BBC Philharmonic Orchestra/Richard Hickox (Chandos, 2000)
- Royal Liverpool Philharmonic Orchestra/David Lloyd-Jones (Naxos, 2007)

== Notes, references and sources ==
=== Sources ===
- Findon, Benjamin William (1904). Sir Arthur Sullivan – His Life and Music. London: James Nisbet. OCLC 499660152.
- Hughes, Gervase (1959). The Music of Sir Arthur Sullivan. London: Macmillan. OCLC 500626743.
- Jacobs, Arthur (1984). Arthur Sullivan: A Victorian Musician. Oxford and New York: Oxford University Press. ISBN 978-0-19-315443-8.
- Jolly, James, ed. (2009). The Gramophone Classical Music Guide. London: Haymarket. ISBN 978-0-86-024922-1.
- Sullivan, Arthur (1915). Symphony in E (PDF). London: Novello.
- Young, Percy M. (1971). Sir Arthur Sullivan. London: J. M. Dent & Sons. ISBN 978-0-460-03934-5.
