= Jason Lai =

British orchestral conductor (born 1974)

Jason Lai Chinese name: 黎志華
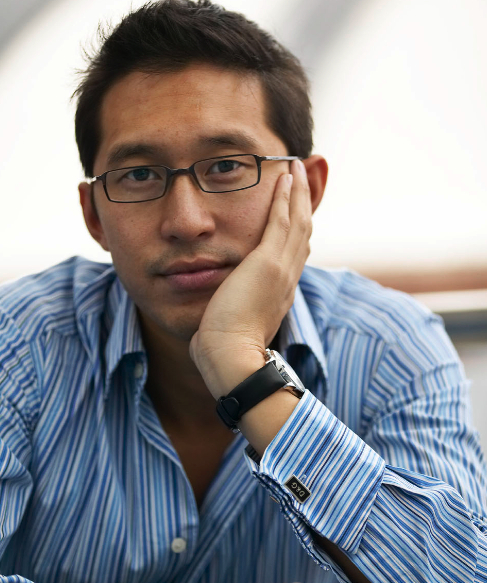

Background information
- Born: Jason Lai; 1974 (age 51–52); England
- Genres: Classical
- Occupation: Conductor
- Instruments: Cello, Piano
- Website: http://www.jason-lai.net

Jason Lai (born 1974) is a British orchestral conductor. He was assistant conductor of the BBC Philharmonic from 2002 to 2005. At present he is the Principal Conductor of the Conservatory Orchestra at the Yong Siew Toh Conservatory of Music which is part of the National University of Singapore. He is also an integral coach, presenter and speaker.

== Biography ==
=== Early years ===
Jason started his musical studies at the age of 10 when he took cello, piano and composition lessons, which continued with the help of a scholarship at Chetham's School of Music in Manchester. In 1993 he was awarded a Hadow Scholarship to study at Worcester College, Oxford, where he became music director of the Oxford University Philharmonia. On completion of his studies at the Guildhall School of Music and Drama he was awarded a Master's in composition and a Diploma in cello. Jason was then appointed the Fellow in Conducting at GSMD from 2000-2002.

=== 2002 onward ===
Lai was the winner of the BBC Young Conductors Workshop in February 2002 and was awarded the post of Assistant Conductor with BBC Philharmonic. His successful tenure there gave him the opportunity to work closely with many conductors and led to invitations with the other BBC orchestras and the BBC Singers, he made his BBC Proms debut with the BBC Philharmonic in 2003.

Jason was a prize winner at the Leeds Conductors Competition in 2005 and has assisted and taken part in masterclasses with Pierre Boulez, Colin Davis, Valery Gergiev and Simon Rattle.

In opera, Lai has conducted Haydn's L'infedeltà delusa for Bampton Classical Opera (2004 and 2005) and Gazzaniga’s Don Giovanni (2004).

Orchestras he has guest-conducted include Hong Kong Philharmonic, Hong Kong Sinfonietta, Ulster Orchestra, Royal Philharmonic, Malaysian Philharmonic, Taipei Symphony Orchestra, Deutsche Kammerphilharmonie Bremen, New Japan Philharmonic, Orchestra of the Swan, Macao Orchestra, Singapore Symphony Orchestra.

=== Television ===
In addition to his conducting Jason has been a broadcaster for a number of years. He was invited to be the panel expert for the 2006 edition of BBC Young Musician of the Year. In 2007 he was one of the judges in the BBC2 classical music talent show Classical Star, and in August 2008 he appeared in the BBC reality TV show Maestro where he was a conducting mentor to Sue Perkins. After conducting their way through many rounds Jason and Sue went on to win the competition. In 2009 Jason was a mentor in Clash! for CBBC in which two teams of 5 talented musicians compete to reversion classical music. In 2015 he was asked to form a community orchestra in Singapore and Project Symphony, an eight part series for Okto Channel, followed this journey which ended with a big concert in the Singapore Conference Hall. In 2016 he was one of four presenters chosen to be a presenter for Tales From Modern China which was a coproduction between BBC World and Jiangsu Broadcasting in China. His most recent TV presenting has been for BBC World's Heart of Asia series in which Jason explores the arts and culture scene in Thailand, Indonesia, Philippines and Korea.
