= Murbach hymns =

- Murbacher Hymnen
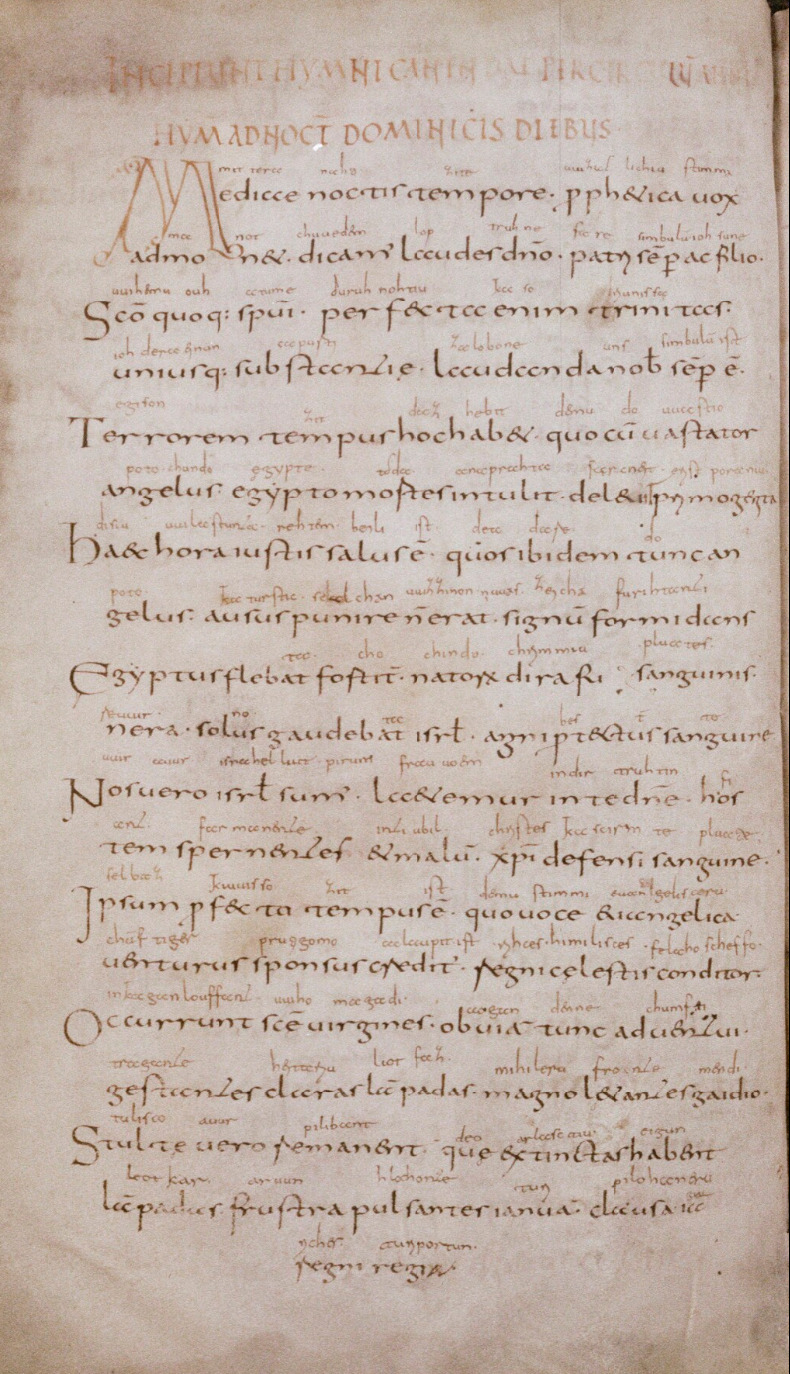
- First page of the hymnal (fol. 122v).
- Compiled by: Monastery workshop
- Language: Latin and Old High German
- Date: Early 9th century
- Provenance: Reichenau and Murbach Abbeys
- Series: Grouped with the Frankish hymnal
- Manuscript(s): MS Junius 25 Bodleian Library
- Genre: Hymnal
- Length: 193 folia, 27 hymns
- Sources: St. Ambrose; Old Hymnal tradition; Some unique

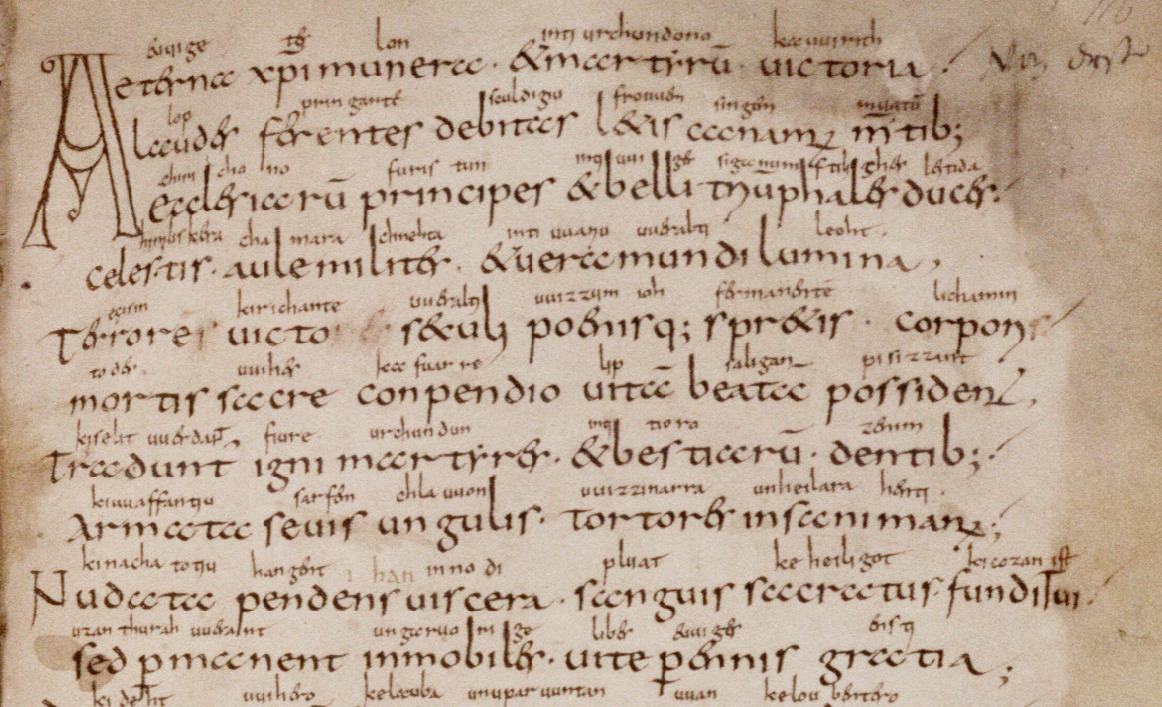
Beginning of hymn 22 (Aeterna christi munera), fol. 116r.

The Murbach hymns (German: Murbacher Hymnen, also Murbacher Hymnar "Murbach hymnal") are a collection of 27 early medieval Latin hymns with interlinear Old High German translation. The hymns are intended to be sung at certain times of the day in the course of the year, being introduced with the header Incipiunt hymni canendi per circulum anni.

Grouped with the Frankish Hymnal, an early medieval extension of the Ambrosian hymns of the Milanese Rite, the Murbach hymns are preserved in a single manuscript of the early 9th century, now part of the Junius collection in the Bodleian Library (MS Junius 25), originally kept at Murbach Abbey, Alsace.

== History ==
Bodleian MS Junius 25 consists of 193 folia, containing the text of the hymns, among various Latin texts and Latin-German glosses, on foll. 122v–129, 116/117. It is the product of an Alamannic monastery workshop, most likely of the first quarter of the 9th century. The hymns were most likely written down in Reichenau, the interlinear version may have been written in Murbach Abbey, where the manuscript was kept until at least the 15th century (based a dated note made in the ms.).

The manuscript was acquired by Marcus Zuerius van Boxhorn, who published glosses from the ms. in 1652. Later in the 17th century it was owned by Isaac Vossius. Franciscus Junius copied the text of the hymns from the ms. while it was in Vossius' possession. The ms. passed into possession of Junius at an unknown date, and was acquired as part of Junius' collection by the Bodleian Library after his death in 1677.

The text of the hymns was first printed by George Hickes in 1703, and by Rasmus Nyerup in 1787. The first philological edition of the text was published by Jacob Grimm in 1830, based on a copy of the text in Junius' hand. Eduard Sievers in 1874 published a new edition based on the original manuscript. Recent critical editions have been published by Simbolotti (2009) and Gerhards (2018).

The collection is classified as belonging to the "Frankish hymnal" by Helmut Gneuss (1968, 2000), grouped with five other collections of the 8th to 9th century. The Latin hymns are described as of Ambrosian or "pseudo-Ambrosian" type. The final hymn on fol. 117v is the Te Deum, the others appear to be original to the "Frankish Hymnal" tradition. Grimm's Latin text was reprinted by Migne (1845) in PL 17 in a collection of "hymns attributed to Saint Ambrose" (hymni S. Ambrosio attributi).

== Interlinear version ==
Opinions on the status of the Old High German translation have varied: Thoma (1958) judged them as wholly dependent on the Latin text and not forming a coherent German text of its own. Sonderegger (1964) by contrast argued that the interlinear version in certain passages does represent a grammatical Old High German text with a poetic quality and "surprising eloquence" (mit erstaunlicher Sprachgewalt). Haubrich (1988) likewise admitted a "literary and poetic ambition" on the part of the author of the interlinear version.

== List of hymns ==
Grimm (1830) counted 26 hymns, but Sievers (1874) identified the final verse of Grimm's hymn 25 as a separate hymn with a single verse, numbered 25a, for a total of 27 hymns. Hymns 1–21 are on foll. 122v–129v. The final six hymns, 22–26, are part of the preceding quaternum in the manuscript, on foll. 116r–117v, followed by nine pages (foll. 118r–122r) of Latin to Old High German glosses. In spite of being edited as forming the conclusion of the collection by their 19th-century editors, they were most likely written down slightly earlier than the 21 hymns that follow. The incipit of the 27 hymns are as follows (Gerhards 2018:13):

| Nr. | fol. | Incipit | Incipit (OHG) | Use | OH | NH | Chevalier no. |
|---|---|---|---|---|---|---|---|
| 22 | 116r | Aeterna Christi munera | Euuige [chris]tes lon | Martyrs | OH 44 | NH 117 | 600 |
| 23 | 116r | Tempus noctis surgentibus | Cit thera naht erstantantem | Nocturns | OH 5 | | 20328 |
| 24 | 116v | Rex aeterna domine | Cuning euuigo truhtin | Nocturns | OH 3 | NH 31 | 17393 |
| 25 | 117r | Aeterne rerum conditor | Euuigo rachono felahanto | Nocturns | OH 2 | NH 4 | 647 |
| 26 [25a] | 117r | Te decet laus | Thir krisit lop | Matins Sunday | | | 20075 |
| 27 [26] | 117v | Te deum laudamus | Thih cot [lobo]mes | Vigils Sunday | OH 6 | | 20086 |
| 1 | 122v | Mediae noctis tempore | Mittera nahti zite | Nocturns Sunday | OH 1 | | 11420 |
| 2 | 123r | Deus qui celi lumen es | Cot du der himiles leoht pist | Matins Sunday | OH 7 | | 4491 |
| 3 | 123v | Splendor paternae gloriae | Schimo faterlicher tiurida | Matins Monday | OH 8 | NH 15 | 19349 |
| 4 | 124r | Aeterne lucis conditor | Euuiges leohtes sceffento | Matins Tuesday | OH 9 | | 626 |
| 5 | 124v | Fulgentis auctor aetheris | Scinantes ortfrumo himiles | Matins Wednesday | OH 10 | | 6608 |
| 6 | 124v | Deus aeterne luminis | Cot euuiges leohtes | Matins Thursday | OH 11 | | 4415 |
| 7 | 125r | Christe caeli domine | Crist hi[mi]les t[ruh]tin | Matins Friday | OH 12 | | 2845 |
| 8 | 125v | Diei luce reddita | Tago leohte arkepanemu | Matins Saturday | OH 13 | | 4586 |
| 9 | 126r | Postmatutinis laudibus | Aftermorganlichem lopum | Prime during Lent | OH 22 | | 15175 |
| 10 | 126v | Dei fide qua vivimus | Kotes kalaubu dera lebemes | Terce during Lent | OH 36 | NH 51 | 4323 |
| 11 | 126v | Certum tenentes ordinem | Kauuissa habente antreitida | Terce | OH 23 | | 2272 |
| 12 | 127r | Dicamus laudes domino | Chuedem lop t[ruhti]ne | Sext | OH 24 | | 4573 |
| 13 | 127r | Perfectum trinum numerum | Duruhnoht drisca ruaua | None | OH 25 | NH 53 | 14836=14835 |
| 14 | 127r | Deus qui claro lumine | Kot der heitaremu leohte | Vespers Sunday | OH 28 | | 4490 |
| 15 | 127v | Deus qui certis legibus | [Cot] der kauuissem euuom | Vespers | OH 27 | | 4489 |
| 16 | 127v | Christe qui lux es et dies | Christ du der leoht pist inti take | Compline | OH 30 | NH 12 | 2934 |
| 17 | 128r | Meridiae orandum est | Mittes takes za petonne ist | Sext during Lent | OH 37 | NH 52 | 11506 |
| 18 | 128r | Sic ter quaternis trahitur | So driror feorim kazokan ist | Vespers | OH 38 | NH 54 | 18913 |
| 19 | 128v | Aurora lucis rutilat | Tagarod leohtes lohazit | Matins at Easter | OH 41 | NH 72 | 1644 |
| 20 | 129r | Hic est dies verus dei | Deser ist tak uuarer cotes | Matins and Vespers at Easter | OH 39 | | 7793 |
| 21 | 129v | Ad cenam agni providi | Za nahtmuase lambes kauuare | Vespers at Easter | OH 40 | NH 70 | 110 |

Hymns 2, 6–9, 11–12, 23 and 26 (single verse) are unique to the Frankish Hymnal tradition, hymns 10, 13–14, 17–19 and 21 are first recorded in the Frankish Hymnal and are received into the New Hymnal. Of the hymns adopted from the earlier Old Hymnal tradition, authorship of Ambrose is likely for hymn 25 (Aeterne rerum conditor), and thought uncertain but possible for hymns 3, 20 and 22.
