= Frankish Hymnal =

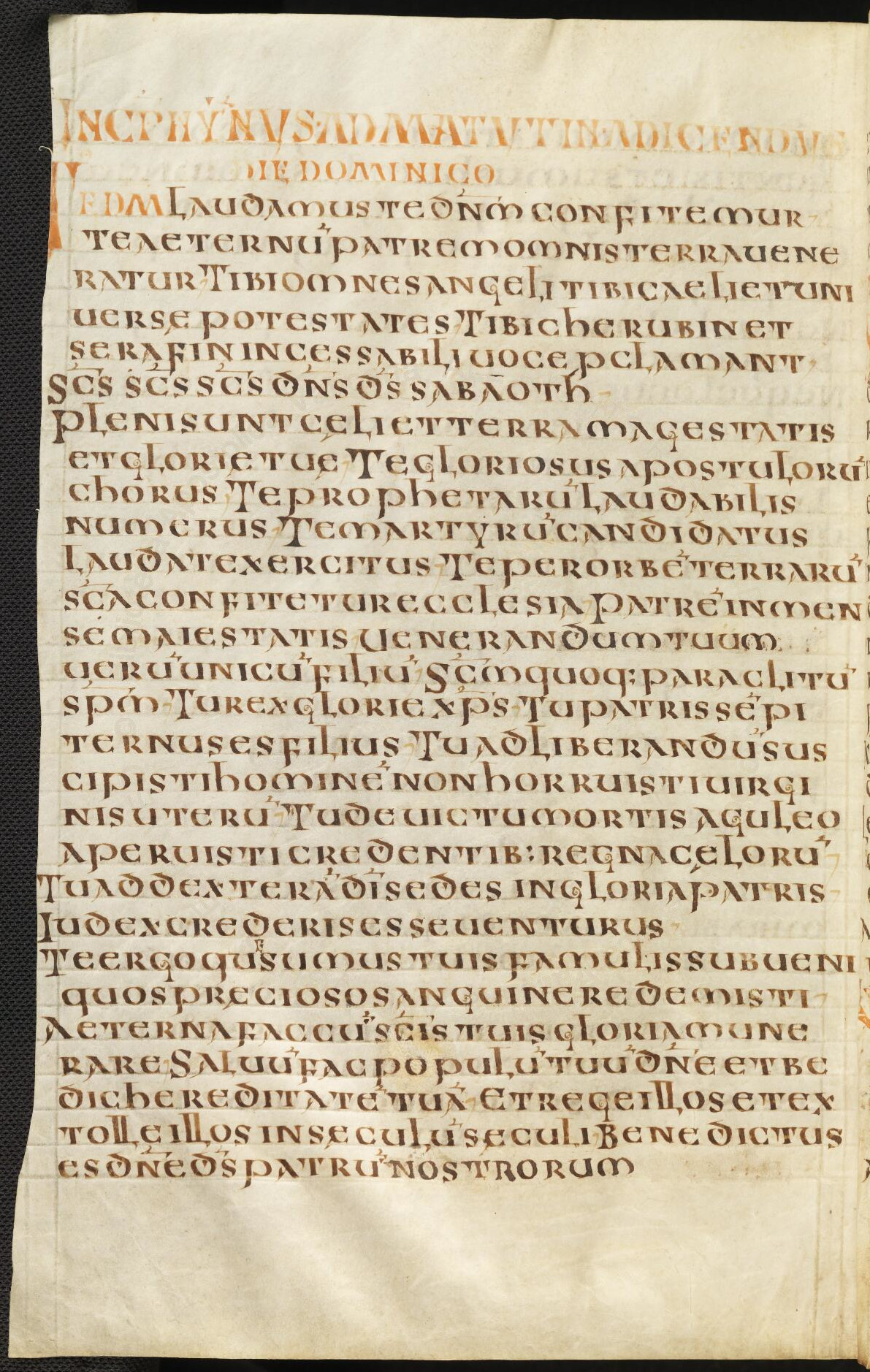
Vatican Reg. Lat. 11, fol. 230v (Te Deum)

The Frankish Hymnal (German: Fränkisches Hymnar, also called "Gallican Hymnal") is a collection of early medieval Latin hymns, most likely composed during the 6th to 8th centuries in Francia, recorded in a set of manuscripts of the mid-8th to early 9th century.

== Manuscripts ==
According to Helmut Gneuss (2000), the extant texts of the Frankish Hymnal are found in the following six manuscripts, all originating in northeastern France or southwestern Germany:

- Vatican Reg. Lat. 11, foll. 230v–236v, mid-8th century;
- Paris B.N. Lat. 14088, 8th or 9th century;
- Paris, B.N. Lat. 13159, c. 795–800;
- Paris, B.N. Lat. 528, early 9th century;
- Zürich, ZB MS Rheinau 34, early 9th century;
- Oxford, Bodleian MS Junius 25 (the Murbach hymnal), early 9th century.

A critical edition of the text was published by Bulst (1956).

The Frankish Hymnal is one of the regional traditions of "Ambrosian hymns", developed on the basis of the "Old Hymnal", a collection of about 15 hymns of the Latin rite which surround the core of original hymns composed by saint Ambrose of Milan in the 4th century. Other regional traditions recognized in Fontaine (1992) are the "Milano Hymnal", the "Spanish Hymnal", and the "New Hymnal" as it developed for the use in Benedictine monasteries in the 9th to 11th centuries.

Within the Frankish hymnal, the Oxford manuscript (the Murbach hymnal) is of particular interest, as it includes a full set of Old High German glosses, likely still dating to the first quarter of the 9th century.

== List of hymns ==
Seventeen hymns are innovations to the Frankish Hymnal (underlined below), of which six survive into the New Hymnal.

OH	Incipit	Use	NH
1	Mediae noctis tempore	Nocturns Sunday	
2	Aeterne rerum conditor	Nocturns	4
3	Rex aeterna domine	Nocturns	31
4	Magna et mirabilia	Nocturns	
5	Tempus noctis	Nocturns	
6	Te deum laudamus	Vigils Sunday	
7	Deus qui caeli lumen es	Lauds Sunday	
8	Splendor paternae gloriae	Matins Monday	15
9	Aeterne lucis conditor	Matins Tuesday	
10	Fulgentis auctor aetheris	Lauds Wednesday	
11	Deus aeterni luminis	Lauds Thursday	
12	Christe caeli domine	Lauds Friday	
13	Diei luce reddita	Lauds Saturday	
17	Iam surgit hora tertia	Terce	
18	Iam sexta sensim volvitur	Sext	
21	Ter hora trina volvitur	None	
22	Postmatutinis laudibus	Prime	
23	Certum tenentes ordinem	Terce	
24	Dicamus laudes domino	Sext	
25	Perfectum trinum numerum	None	53
26	Deus creator omnium	Vespers	2
27	Deus qui certis legibus	Vespers	
28	Deus qui claro lumine	Vespers	
29	Sator princepsque temporum	Vespers	
30	Christe qui lux es et dies	Compline	12
34	Intende qui regis Israel	Christmas	39
35	Illuminans altissimus	Epiphany	
36	Dei fide qua vivimus	Terce during Lent	51
37	Meridie orandum est	Sext during Lent	52
38	Sic ter quaternis trahitur	Vespers, None during Lent	54
39	Hic est dies verus dei	Matins and Vespers at Easter	
40	Ad cenam agni providi	Easter	70
41	Aurora lucis rutilat	Easter	72
44	Aeterna Christi munera	Martyrs	117

== See also ==
- Missale Francorum (Vat. Reg. Lat. 257)
