= Ambrosian hymns =

Latin hymnody in from the 4th century

The Ambrosian hymns are a collection of early hymns of the Latin liturgical rites, whose core of four hymns were by Ambrose of Milan in the 4th century.

The hymns of this core were enriched with another eleven to form the Old Hymnal, which spread from the Ambrosian Rite of Milan throughout Lombard Italy, Visigothic Spain, Anglo-Saxon England and the Frankish Empire during the early medieval period (6th to 8th centuries); in this context, therefore, the term “Ambrosian” does not imply authorship by Ambrose himself, to whom only four hymns are attributed with certainty, but includes all Latin hymns composed in the style of the Old Hymnal.

The Frankish Hymnal, and to a lesser extent the “Mozarabic (Spanish) Hymnal” represent a reorganisation of the Old Hymnal undertaken in the 8th century. In the 9th century, the Frankish Hymnal was in turn re-organised and expanded, resulting in the high medieval New Hymnal of the Benedictine order, which spread rapidly throughout Europe in the 10th century, containing on the order of 150 hymns in total.

== Origin ==
The earliest Latin hymns were built on the template of the hymns (ῠ̔́μνοι) of the Greek and Syriac churches of the second to third centuries. The first Latin hymns were composed by Hilary of Poitiers (d. 367), who had spent in Asia Minor some years of exile from his see, and had thus become acquainted with the hymns of the Eastern Church; his Liber Hymnorum has not survived. Hilary, who is mentioned by Isidore of Seville as the first to compose Latin hymns, and Ambrose (d. 397), styled by Dreves (1893) “the Father of Church-song”, are linked together as pioneers of Western hymnody.

The Old Hymnal consists of the extant Latin hymns composed during the 4th and 5th centuries. The hymns of the Old Hymnal are in a severe style, clothing Christian ideas in classical phraseology, and yet appealing to popular tastes. At the core of these is the hymn Te Deum. Since the spread of the Old Hymnal is closely associated with the Ambrosian Rite, Te Deum had long been known as “the Ambrosian Hymn”. While it certainly dates to the 4th century, Ambrose's authorship is no longer taken for granted, the hymn being variously ascribed to Hilary, Augustine of Hippo, or Nicetas of Remesiana.

Isidore, who died in 636, testifies to the spread of the custom from Milan throughout the whole of the West, and first refers to the hymns as “Ambrosian”.

== Metre ==
The Ambrosian strophe has four verses of iambic dimeters (eight syllables), e. g. —

Aeterne rerum Conditor, / noctem diemque qui regis, / et temporum das tempora / ut alleves fastidium.

The metre differs but slightly from the rhythm of prose, is easy to construct and to memorize, adapts itself very well to all kinds of subjects, offers sufficient metric variety in the odd feet (which may be either iambic or spondaic), while the form of the strophe lends itself well to musical settings (as the English accentual counterpart of the metric and strophic form illustrates). This poetic form has always been the favourite for liturgical hymns, as the Roman Breviary will show at a glance. But in earlier times the form was almost exclusively used, down to and beyond the eleventh century.

Out of 150 hymns in the eleventh-century Benedictine hymnals, for example, not a dozen are in other metres; and the Ambrosian Breviary re-edited by Charles Borromeo in 1582 has its hymns in that metre almost exclusively. It should be said, however, that even in the days of Ambrose the classical metres were slowly giving place to accentual ones, as his work occasionally shows; while in subsequent ages, down to the reform of the Breviary under pope Urban VIII, hymns were composed most largely by accented measure.

== Ambrosian authorship ==
That Ambrose himself is the author of some hymns is not under dispute. Like Hilary, Ambrose was also a “Hammer of the Arians”. Answering their complaints on this head, he says: “Assuredly I do not deny it ... All strive to confess their faith and know how to declare in verse the Father and the Son and the Holy Ghost.” And Augustine of Hippo speaks of the occasion when the hymns were introduced by Ambrose to be sung “according to the fashion of the East”. However, the term “Ambrosian” does not imply authorship by Ambrose himself. The term, (Hymni Ambrosiani) is used in the rule of St. Benedict, and already by the 9th century Walafridus Strabo notes that, while Benedict styled Ambrosianos the hymns to be used in the canonical hours, the term is to be understood as referring both to hymns composed by Ambrose, and to hymns composed by others who followed in his form. Strabo further remarks that many hymns were wrongly supposed to be Ambrose's, including some “which have no logical coherence and exhibit an awkwardness alien to the style of Ambrose”.

H. A. Daniel, in his Thesaurus Hymnologicus (1841–51) still mistakenly attributed seven hymns to Hilary, two of which (Lucis largitor splendide and Beata nobis gaudia) were considered by hymnologists generally to have had good reason for the ascription, until Blume (1897) showed the error underlying the ascription.

The two hymns have the metric and strophic cast peculiar to the authenticated hymns of Ambrose and to the hymns which were afterwards composed on the model. Daniel gave no less than ninety-two Ambrosian hymns, under of “S. Ambrosius et Ambrosiani”.

Similarly, Migne, in Patrologia Latina 17 (1845) edited Hymni S. Ambrosio attributi, without attempting to decide which hymns of the Old Hymnal are genuinely due to Ambrose.

Modern hymnology has reduced the number of hymns for which Ambrosian authorship is plausible to about fifteen, including uncertain cases. The Maurists limited the number they would ascribe to St. Ambrose to twelve. Luigi Biraghi (1862) and Dreves (1893) raised the figure to eighteen.

Chevalier is criticised minutely and elaborately by Blume for his Ambrosian indications: twenty without reservation, seven “(S. Ambrosius)”, two unbracketed but with a “?”, seven with bracket and question-mark, and eight with a varied lot of brackets, question-marks, and simultaneous possible ascriptions to other hymnodists.

Only four hymns are universally conceded to be authentic:

1. Aeterne rerum conditor (OH 2);
2. Deus creator omnium (OH 26);
3. Jam surgit hora tertia (OH 17);
4. Veni redemptor gentium [= Intende qui regis Israel] (OH 34).

With respect to the first three, Augustine quotes from them and directly credits their authorship to Ambrose. Internal evidence for No. 1 is found in many verbal and phrasal correspondences between strophes 4-7 and the “Hexaëmeron” of the Bishop. Augustine also appears to refer to No. 4 (to the third verse of the fourth strophe, Geminae Gigas substantiae) when he says: “This going forth of our Giant [Gigantis] is briefly and beautifully hymned by Blessed Ambrose”. Other attributions to Ambrose are due to Pope Celestine V (430), Faustus, Bishop of Riez (455) and to Cassiodorus (died 575).

Of these four hymns, only No. 1 is now found in the Roman Breviary. It is sung at Lauds on Sunday from the Octave of the Epiphany to the first Sunday in Lent, and from the Sunday nearest to the first day of October until Advent. There are numerous translations into English, of which that by Cardinal Newman is given in the Marquess of Bute's Breviary (trans. 1879).

The additional eight tunes and/or hymns credited to St. Ambrose by the Benedictine editors are:

(5) Illuminans altissimus (OH 35) Epiphany;
(6) Aeterna Christi munera (OH 44) Martyrs;
(7) Splendor paternae gloriae (OH 8) Lauds, Monday; in Mode 1 this is both tune and words, but a second tune, to the words, was called 'Winchester New'.
(8) Orabo mente dominum (now recognised as part of Bis ternas horas explicans, OH 19);
(9) Somno refectis artubus (NH 14);
(10) Consors paterni luminis (OH 51, NH 17);
(11) O lux beata Trinitas (NH 1);
(12) Fit porta Christi pervia (NH 94).

The Roman Breviary parcels No. 6 out into two hymns: for Martyrs (beginning with a strophe not belonging to the hymn (Christo profusum sanguinem); and for Apostles (Aeterna Christi munera). No. 7 is assigned in the Roman Breviary to Monday at Lauds, from the Octave of the Epiphany to the first Sunday in Lent and from the Octave of Pentecost to Advent. Nos. 9, 10, 11 are also in the Roman Breviary. (No. 11, however, being altered into Jam sol recedit igneus. Nos. 9–12 have verbal or phrasal correspondences with acknowledged hymns by Ambrose. No. 8 remains to be considered. The Maurists gave it to Ambrose with some hesitation, because of its prosodial ruggedness, and because they knew it not to be a fragment (six verses) of a longer poem, and the (apparently) six-lined form of strophe puzzled them. Daniel pointed out (Thes., I, 23, 24; IV, 13) that it is a fragment of the longer hymn (in strophes of four lines), Bis ternas horas explicans, and credited it to Ambrose without hesitation.

The 18 hymns attributed to Ambrose by Biraghi (1862) are 1–7 above, and the following:

Nunc sancte nobis spiritus;
(OH 20) Rector potens, verax Deus Terce (Roman Breviary);
(NH 10) Rerum Deus Tenax Vigor Sext (Roman Breviary);
(OH 43) Amore Christi nobilis None (Roman Breviary);
Agnes beatae virginis;
(OH 39) Hic est dies verus dei;
Victor nabor, felix pii;
Grates tibi Jesu novas;
(OH 42) Apostolorum passio;
Apostolorum supparem;
Jesu corona virginum office of virgins (Roman Breviary).

Biraghi's list received the support of Dreves (1893) and of Blume (1901), but 20th-century scholarship has tended to reduce the number of hymns attributable to Ambrose. Helmut Gneuss (1968) accepts only hymns 1–4 as certainly composed by Ambrose, and admits possible Ambrosian authorship for a further six (three from the Benedictine list, three from Biraghi's list): Illuminans altissimus (OH 35), Aeterna Christi munera (OH 44), Splendor paternae gloriae (OH 8), Hic est dies verus dei (OH 39), Apostolorum passio (OH 42), Amore Christi nobilis (OH 43).

== Hymnals ==
The term “Old Hymnal” refers to Benedictine hymnals of the 6th to 8th centuries. Gneuss' (1968) distinguished the core “Old Hymnal I” of the 6th century, with about 15 hymns, from the 8th-century “Old Hymnal II”, with about 25 hymns, including both additions and deletions in comparison with Old Hymnal I. Gneuss (1974) renamed his “Old Hymnal II” to “Frankish Hymnal”. The Frankish Hymnal represents a revision of the Old Hymnal taking place in the Frankish Empire during the 8th to early 9th centuries. By contrast, the Old Hymnal came to Anglo-Saxon England with the Gregorian mission, and the Anglo-Saxon church does not seem to have adopted the Frankish Hymnal. Sometimes also distinguished is a “Mozarabic Hymnal” or “Spanish Hymnal”, which adopted some but not all innovations of the Frankish Hymnal.

The Frankish Hymnal itself was replaced by the so-called New Hymnal, beginning in the 9th century. This development was possibly associated with the reforms of Benedict of Aniane, but its rapid success also suggests support form the secular authorities (the Carolingians, viz. Louis the Pious and his successors). The New Hymnal spread rapidly throughout Europe by the early 10th century, and reached England with the English Benedictine Reform in the late 10th century. The earliest extant form of the New Hymnal has 38 hymns. Gneuss (1968) lists a total of 133 hymns of the New Hymnal based on English Benedictine manuscripts of the 10th and 11th centuries.

The Cistercian order in the 12th century again simplified the New Hymnal to a core of 34 hymns which they thought were purely Ambrosian, but this was again expanded with an additional 25 hymns in 1147. Peter Abelard composed more than 90 entirely new hymns, and large numbers of further new hymns were composed by members of the Franciscans and Dominicans in the 13th century, resulting in a very large body of Latin hymns beyond the Benedictine New Hymnal preserved in manuscripts of the late medieval period. The New Hymnal was substantially revised in the 17th century, under the humanist Pope Urban VIII, whose alterations are inherited in the current-day Roman Breviary.

== List of Hymns ==
Gneuss (1968) lists 133 hymns of the New Hymnal, based on their sequence in Durham Cathedral Library B.III.32. Gneuss' index of the “Old Hymnal” includes hymns of the Frankish Hymnal (called “Old Hymnal II” in Gneuss 1968). Milfull (1996) extends the list of New Hymnal hymns from English manuscripts to 164.

=== Old Hymnal ===
OH	Incipit	Use	NH
1	Mediae noctis tempore	Nocturns Sunday	
2	Aeterne rerum conditor	Nocturns	4
3	Rex aeterna domine	Nocturns	31
4	Magna et mirabilia	Nocturns	
6	Te deum laudamus	Vigils Sunday	
8	Splendor paternae gloriae	Matins Monday	15
9	Aeterne lucis conditor	Matins Tuesday	
14	Fulgentis auctor aetheris	Prime	
15	Venite fratres ocius	Prime	
16	Iam lucis orto sidere	Prime	7
17	Iam surgit hora tertia	Terce	
18	Iam sexta sensim volvitur	Sext	
19	Bis ternas horas explicans	Sext	
20	Rector potens verax deus	Sext	9
21	Ter hora trina volvitur	None	
26	Deus creator omnium	Vesper	2
27	Deus qui certis legibus	Vespers	
30	Christe qui lux es et dies	Compline	12
31	Te lucis ante terminum	Compline	11
32	Christe precamur annue	Compline	
33	Te deprecamur domine	Compline	
34	Intende qui regis Israel	Christmas	39
35	Illuminans altissimus	Epiphany	
39	Hic est dies verus dei	Matins and Vesper at Easter	
42	Apostolorum passio	Peter and Paul	
43	Amore Christi nobilis	John Evangelist	
44	Aeterna Christi munera	Martyrs	117

=== Frankish Hymnal ===
The Frankish Hymnal preserves OH 1-4, 6, 8-9, 17-18, 21, 26-27, 30,34, 39, 44. Eleven hymns are unique to the Frankish Hymnal, while six of its new hymns survive into the New Hymnal. The new hymns in the Frankish Hymnal are:

OH	Incipit	Use	NH
5	Tempus noctis	Nocturns	
7	Deus qui caeli lumen es	Lauds Sunday	
10	Fulgentis auctor aetheris	Lauds Wednesday	
11	Deus aeterni luminis	Lauds Thursday	
12	Christe caeli domine	Lauds Friday	
13	Diei luce reddita	Lauds Saturday	
22	Postmatutinis laudibus	Prime	
23	Certum tenentes ordinem	Terce	
24	Dicamus laudes domino	Sext	
25	Perfectum trinum numerum	None	53
28	Deus qui claro lumine	Vespers	
29	Sator princepsque temporum	Vespers	
36	Dei fide qua vivimus	Terce during Lent	51
37	Meridie orandum est	Sext during Lent	52
38	Sic ter quaternis trahitur	Vespers, None during Lent	54
40	Ad cenam agni providi	Easter	70
41	Aurora lucis rutilat	Easter	72

=== New Hymnal ===
NH	Incipit	Use	OH
1	O lux beata trinitas	Vespers, Saturday, winter	
2	Deus creator omnium	Vespers, Sunday, summer	26
3	Primo dierum	Matins, Sunday, winter	
4	Aeterne rerum conditor	Lauds, Sunday, winter	2
5	Nocte surgentes	Matins, Sunday, summer	
6	Ecce iam noctis	Lauds, Sunday, summer	
7	Iam lucis orto	Vespers	16
8	Nunc sancte nobis	Terce	
9	Rector potens	Sext	20
10	Rerum deus	None	
11	Te lucis ante	Compline, summer	31
12	Christe qui lux es	Compline, winter	30
13	Lucis creator	Vespers, Sunday	
14	Somno refectis artubus	Matins, Monday	
15	Splendor paternae	Lauds, Monday	8
16	Immense caeli	Vespers, Monday	
17	Concors paterni	Matins, Tuesday	
18	Ales diei	Lauds, Tuesday	
19	Telluri ingens	Vespers, Tuesday	
31	Rex aeterna domine	Nocturns	3
39	Veni redemptor	Compline, Christmas Eve	34
51	Dei fide qua vivimus	Terce during Lent	36
52	Meridie orandum est	Sext during Lent	37
53	Perfectum trinum numerum	None	25
54	Sic ter quaternis trahitur	Vespers, None during Lent	38
70	Ad cenam agni providi	Easter	40
72	Aurora lucis rutilat	Easter	41
117	Aeterna Christi munera	Lauds, several Martyrs	44
129	Quaesumus ergo	Lauds, Dedication of the Church	
134	Iesus redemptor seculi	Compline, Sundays, feasts	
145	Fratres unanimi	St Martin	

== See also ==
- Hymnology
- Ambrosian Rite
- Ambrosian Hymn (Te Deum)
- Latin rite
- Frankish Hymnal
- Conditor alme siderum
