= Ernst Kähler =

Ernst Kähler (1914–1991) was a German Protestant theologian and Church historian. He was the grandson of theologian Martin Kähler (1835–1912).

Kähler studied in Tübingen, Göttingen, Halle and Basel. He was drafted into military service during 1940–1945 and was severely wounded. He married Sibylla von Kirchbach (1922–2009) in 1944, with whom he had six children. He served as assistant at the theological faculty at Halle University during 1942–1951. He completed his dissertation in 1948 at Göttingen University. From 1952 he was rector at the theological seminary at Naumburg, then in the German Democratic Republic. He was lecturer for ecclesiastical history at the University of Greifswald from 1954, from 1958 as assistant professor, from 1960 as ordinarily professor. He retired in 1978. Kähler received an honorary doctorate from the theological faculty at Göttingen University in 1957.

Kähler is best known as editor of the theological works of Martin Luther and for his work on the history of the Reformation.

== Bibliography ==
- 1952: Karlstadt und Augustin. Eine Einführung in den Kommentar des Andreas Bodenstein von Karlstadt zu Augustins Schrift „De spiritu et litera“ (Hallische Monographien 19)
- 1958: Studien zum Te Deum und zur Geschichte des 24. Psalms in der Alten Kirche (Veröffentlichungen der Evangelischen Gesellschaft für Liturgieforschung 10)
- 1958: "Bugenhagen und Luther" in: Werner Rautenberg (ed.), Johann Bugenhagen. Beiträge zu seinem 400. Todestag, 108–122.
- 1959: "Die Wirklichkeit Gottes und die Wirklichkeit der Welt im Werk Johann Bugenhagens" in: Evangelische Theologie 19, 453–469.
- 1968: Reformation 1517–1967.

as editor

- 1962: Martin Kähler: Geschichte der protestantischen Dogmatik im 19. Jahrhundert
- 1965: Martin Kähler: Jesus und das Alte Testament (Biblische Studien 45)
- 1967: Martin Kähler: Aufsätze zur Bibelfrage
- 1968: Reformation 1517–1967. Wittenberger Vorträge.
