= Martin Kähler =

German theologian (1835–1912)

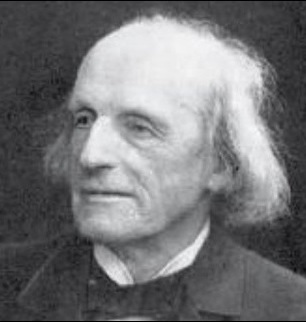
Martin Kähler (about 1905)

Martin Kähler (6 January 1835 – 7 September 1912) was a German theologian. He is best known for his short work, published in 1892, Der sogenannte historische Jesus und der geschichtliche, biblische Christus (The so-called historical Jesus and the historic, biblical Christ).

== Life and career ==
Kähler was born in Neuhausen (now Guryevsky District) near Königsberg.

According to Kähler, the quest for the historical Jesus ("The Life-of-Jesus research") is challenged by there existing no historical biographies of the life of Jesus. The gospels serve as our only sources, and they are limited in scope, leaving many unanswered questions. One must resist the urge to speculate too much about the life of Jesus, as some historical analogies and psychoanalyses do. He concludes that we do not need to know all the details about Jesus' life. All we really need to know is that Jesus died for the sins of the world. It is through him that we are redeemed. Preoccupation with tenuous details about Jesus' life distracts from that which really matters about Jesus: his redeeming death and his subsequent resurrection.

Kähler died in Freudenstadt. His works were partly edited by his grandson, Ernst Kähler (1914–1991). Martin Kähler had a profound impact upon the famous Protestant theologian, Paul Tillich.
