= Te Deum (Pärt) =

1985 musical composition by Arvo Pärt

- by Arvo Pärt
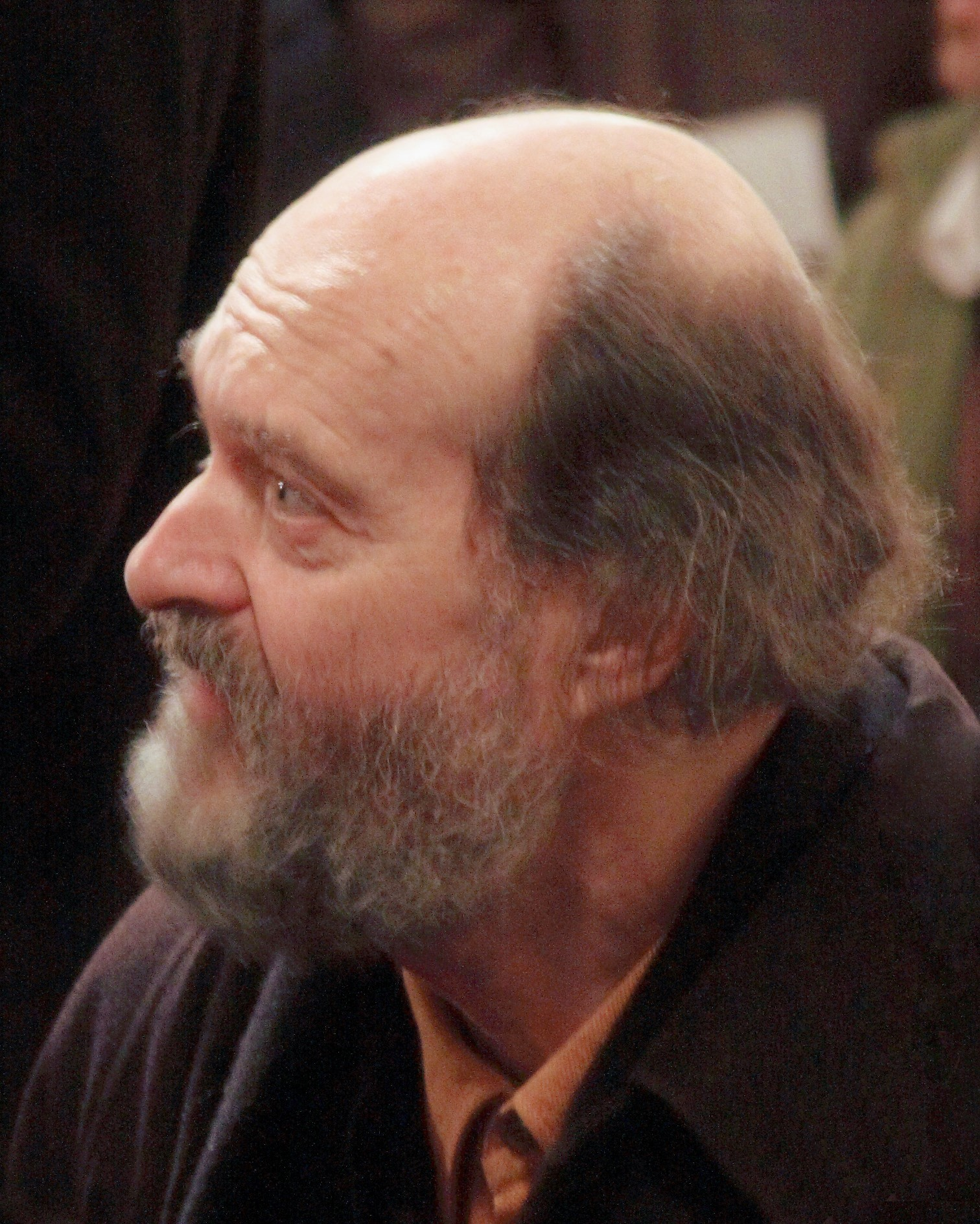
- The composer
- Style: tintinnabuli
- Text: Te Deum
- Language: Latin
- Composed: 1984
- Scoring: women's choir; men's choir; mixed choir; prepared piano; strings; wind harp

Premiere
- Date: 19 January 1985
- Location: Westdeutscher Rundfunk, Cologne

Te Deum is a setting of the Latin Te Deum text, also known as the Ambrosian Hymn attributed to Saints Ambrose, Augustine, and Hilary, by Estonian-born composer Arvo Pärt, commissioned by the Westdeutscher Rundfunk in Cologne, Germany, in 1984. Dedicated to the late Alfred Schlee of Universal Edition, the WDR Broadcast Choir premiered the Te Deum under the direction of conductor Dennis Russell Davies on January 19, 1985. The Te Deum plays an important role in the services of many Christian denominations, including the Paraklesis (Moleben) of Thanksgiving in the Eastern Orthodox Church. Because of the unusual instrumentation Pärt employs, his Te Deum is not suited for use within the Orthodox Church. It was recorded on the ECM New Series label in 1993 by the Estonian Philharmonic Chamber Choir and Tallinn Chamber Orchestra under the direction of Tõnu Kaljuste. The piece is approximately thirty minutes long.

Te Deum employs Pärt's signature tintinnabuli compositional style. Tintinnabuli is often described as a minimalistic compositional technique, as its harmonic logic departs from that of the tonal tradition of Western classical music, creating its own distinct harmonic system. Tintinnabulation is a process in which a chosen triad encircles a melody, manifesting itself in specific positions in relation to the melody according to a predetermined scheme of adjacency. In its most rudimentary form, Pärt's tintinnabuli music is composed of two main voices: one carries the usually stepwise melody (M-voice) while the other follows the trajectory of the melody but is limited to notes of a specific triad (T-voice). In the case of Te Deum, it is a D triad that is featured in the T-voice, and as such provides the harmonic basis for the entire piece.

The work is scored for three choirs (women's choir, men's choir, and mixed choir), prepared piano, divisi strings, and wind harp. According to the Universal Edition full score, the piano part requires that four pitches be prepared with metal screws and calls for "as large a concert grand as possible" and "amplified". The wind harp is similar to the Aeolian harp, its strings vibrating due to wind passing through the instrument. Manfred Eicher of ECM Records "recorded this 'wind music' on tape and processed it acoustically." The two notes (D and A) performed on the wind harp are to be played on two separate CD or DAT recordings. According to the score preface, the wind harp functions as a drone throughout the piece, fulfilling "a function comparable to that of the ison in Byzantine church music, a repeated note which does not change pitch."

On an ECM records leaflet, Pärt wrote that the Te Deum text has "immutable truths", reminding him of the "immeasurable serenity imparted by a mountain panorama." His composition sought to communicate a mood "that could be infinite in time—out of the flow of infinity. I had to draw this music gently out of silence and emptiness." (Hillier 140)

== Text and melody ==
The Latin text of the Te Deum is made up of 29 lines of verse, each of which is the subject of one section of Pärt's composition. These 29 sections are not considered movements in the sense of traditional choral works because they are not separated by silences or pauses. Each line of text is introduced as plainsong before its augmentation in either a choral or instrumental texture. Although each of the piece's 29 sections follow this pattern, they function differently from the movements of traditional choral works because they are not punctuated by silences or pauses. With the notable exception of three silences, each section of the Te Deum flows directly into the succeeding one, with the wind-harp drone often serving as part of the sonic bridge between.

Pärt harmonizes the melody (M-voice) of Te Deum using his signature tintinnabuli process. As is common in Pärt's choral works, the melodic contour of the M-voice is subject to a kind of compositional serialization based directly on the text. In the case of Te Deum, the melody is tied to the text's syllabic and grammatical features. All words either begin or end on a given pitch, and the number of syllables in each word determines how far from that pitch the melody deviates. For example, if a word has three syllables and the pitch center is A, then the first note might be A, the second note B and third note C.

The melodic contours of Te Deum are thus strictly tied to the rhythms of the text. The text, by engendering the melody that then dictates the harmony, becomes fundamental to all aspects of the piece. Not only does the text provide linguistic meaning, but also it informs the musical form itself in a way that is uncharacteristic of traditional text-setting practices.

== Melodic serialization process ==
Paul Hillier theorizes these syllabically derived melodies in terms of four different modes, outlined below. (All examples assume that the M-voice is written in C major with C as the pitch center. The five notes given in each example also assume a five-syllable word; fewer or more syllables would lead to a larger or smaller number of pitches, respectively.)

Mode 1: ascending away from the pitch center (e.g.: C-D-E-F-G) Mode 2: descending away from the pitch center (e.g.: C-B-A-G-F) Mode 3: descending toward the pitch center (e.g.: G-F-E-D-C) Mode 4: ascending toward the pitch center (e.g.: F-G-A-B-C)

Additionally, stressed syllables in multisyllabic words are brought forward in the melody by writing them melismatically (the technical term for when a single syllable that is split between two pitches). This melisma can take one of two forms.

The first is a simple splitting on a syllable over two adjacent pitches. In these cases, a stressed syllable first takes the pitch assigned it by the syllabic system described above, but then it also anticipates the pitch of the word's subsequent syllable. For example, if the three-syllable word "Dominum" were written accordingly (in Mode 1 with a pitch center of C) it would look like this:

"Do-" would be sung first on C, then would ascend to D "-mi-" would be sung on D "-num-" would be sung on E

The other sort of melisma Pärt uses on the stressed syllables of Te Deum is one in which two notes of the tintinnabuli chord melodically surround the melodic pitch. In this case, the "Do-" of "Dominum" might be sung on C (the melodic note), drop down to a G a fourth below, and jump up to an E (both notes of the C tintinnabuli triad) before descending to the D on which the syllable "-mi-" is sung.

== Harmonic process (tintinnabuli) ==
Tintinnabuli harmony consists of a reaction in the harmonic line (or T-line) to the M-line, such that the former follows the contour of the latter, but makes use only of pitches of the tintinnabuli triad.

The most prominent tintinnabuli line in Te Deum is 1st position alternating.

The harmony in the piece is principally based on the triads of D major and D minor, with appearances of A minor interspersed throughout.

An important feature of the harmonic language of Te Deum is the prominence of drones. Although not part of Pärt's tintinnabulation style, drones are very much part of the chant aesthetic to which Pärt alludes throughout the piece. Although mainly a D drone, there are moments where an A drone dominates the texture.

== Influence of early European music and church music ==
Te Deum arguably bears more resemblance to early Christian music than to the choral works of the past three hundred years. The structure of the sections, which present a chant followed by its elaboration in multiple voices, mimics a structure common in Renaissance polyphonic masses. The wind harp drone, on the other hand, can be likened to the ison (or drone voice) found in Byzantine chant. Byzantine chant was not monophonic like its Latin counterparts, but featured two voices: one melody and one drone. The drone was particularly significant in the Orthodox Church because it spoke to the unchanging, underlying reality behind worship. Hillier considers the drone in Te Deum similar to this Orthodox precedent, calling it the "spiritual force" that unites the piece and functions as its foundation.

The drone can thus be thought of less as a part of the piece itself than it is a part of the environment in which the choirs and strings perform. Pärt himself wrote that the text of Te Deum bears for him "immutable truths" that remind him of the "immeasurable serenity imparted by a mountain panorama" (Te Deum liner notes). His composition sought to communicate a mood "that could be infinite in time—out of the flow of infinity. I had to draw this music gently out of silence and emptiness." (Hillier, 140) The music in many ways evokes this mountain panorama. Not only does the foundational drove function similarly to the base of a mountain (143), but the piece also features many other unchanging elements that imply an immutable, spiritual force. The tintinnabuli process, founded on the constant reiteration of the notes of a single, unchanging triad, is one such constant element.

== Recordings ==
- Tõnu Kaljuste, conductor, Europa Cantat XIII, Linz 1997 [Te Deum (7 min excerpt)] by Arvo Pärt, Europa Cantat Choir, Audio Video Aktuell EC XIII (1997)
- Tõnu Kaljuste, conductor, Te Deum by Arvo Pärt, Estonian Philharmonic Chamber Choir, Tallinn Chamber Orchestra, ECM/Universal Classics ECM 1505/439 162 (1993)
- Myung-whun Chung, Te Deum by Arvo Pärt, Coro e Orchestra dell'Accademia Nazionale di Santa Cecilia, Deutsche Grammophon/Universal Classics 469 076, (2000)
- Lucius Juon, conductor, Te Deum/Silouans Song/Berliner Messe, Kammerchor Chur, (no label specified) CD990529, (1995)
- Nenia Zenana, conductor, Vaerkeraf Hildegard von Bingen/Arvo Pärt: Te Deum, Akademisk Kor/Akademisk Orkester, Classico CLASSCD469, (2002)
- Peter Dijkstra, conductor, Te Deum/Wallfahrtslied/Berliner Messe/Dopo la vittoria, Chor des Bayerischen Rundfunks, Münchner Rundfunkorchester, BR Klassik 900511, (2015)
