= Aurora lucis rutilat =

Incipit of an Easter hymn of the Latin rite

Aurora lucis rutilat (Latin for "Dawn reddens with light"; Ecclesiastical Latin: [au̯ˈrɔː.ra ˈluː.t͡ʃis ˈruː.ti.lat]) is the incipit of an Easter hymn of the Latin rite, first recorded in the Frankish Hymnal tradition (8th/9th century, one of the Murbach hymns) and preserved in the Benedictine "New Hymnal" (9th/10th century). In the numbering introduced by Gneuss (1968), it is no. 41 of the Old Hymnal, and no. 72 of the New Hymnal. The hymn has 12 strophes of 4 verses each as originally recorded;in modern translations it is often reduced to 11 or fewer strophes. The Old High German interlinear version in Bodleian Junius 25 begins Tagarod leohtes lohazit.

Orlande de Lassus composed an adaptation as a motet for ten voices in c. 1592. The portion Tristes erant apostoli (strophes 5 to 11) was adapted by Francisco Guerrero (1528–1599). Alberto Ginastera adapted it twice: first as the final movement of his opus 45 Turbae for choirs and orchestra, and then again as his opus 52 for solo organ, Variazioni e Toccata sopra Aurora lucis Rutilat.

Pope Urban VIII substantially altered the hymn for his edition of the Roman Breviary (1629), in the incipit replacing rutilat by purpurat, the first strophe being altered from:

Aurora lucis rutilat, caelum laudibus intonat, mundus exultans iubilat, gemens infernus ululat.
("Dawn reddens with light, the heavens resound with praise, exulting the world jubilates, groaning hell shrieks.")

to:

Aurora coelum purpurat, aether resultat laudibus, mundus triumphans jubilat, horrens Avernus intremit.
("Dawn purples the heavens, the aether rebounds with praise, triumphantly the world jubilates, frightful Avernus trembles.")

The original text was restored in the reform of the Roman Breviary by Pope Pius X (1908/13). In the 1908 Roman Breviary, the hymn has been revised and separated into three hymns, consisting of strophes 1–4, 5–8 and 9–11. The first part forms the hymn for Lauds from Low Sunday to the Ascension, and begin in the revised form, Aurora caelum purpurat. The second part (Tristes erant apostoli) is incorporated into the Common of Apostles and Evangelists for paschal time at the first and second Vespers and Matins. It is sung in the Phrygian mode, in a melody found in the Vesperale Romanum. The third part (Claro paschali gaudio) was incorporated into Lauds in the Common of Apostles in paschal time.

There are a number of English translations in use, both of the hymn as a whole and the three split hymns. Singable English translations variously begin: "The dawn was redd'ning [purpling] o'er the sky" (Edward Caswall 1849), "With sparkling rays morn decks the sky" (J.A. Johnston 1852), "Light's very morn its beams displays" (J.D. Chambers 1857), "Light's glittering morn bedecks the sky" (J. M. Neale 1852).

== Text ==
	J. M. Neale (1852)
1. Aurora lucis rutilat, caelum laudibus intonat, mundus exultans iubilat, gemens infernus ululat, 2. Cum rex ille fortissimus, mortis confractis viribus, pede conculcans tartara solvit catena miseros!: 3. Ille, qui clausus lapide custoditur sub milite, triumphans pompa nobile victor surgit de funere.: 4. Solutis iam gemitibus et inferni doloribus, "Quia surrexit Dominus!" resplendens clamat angelus.	Light's glittering morn bedecks the sky, heaven thunders forth its victor cry, the glad earth shouts its triumph high, and groaning hell makes wild reply: While he, the King of glorious might, treads down death's strength in death's despite, and trampling hell by victor's right, brings forth his sleeping Saints to light. Fast barred beneath the stone of late in watch and ward where soldiers wait, now shining in triumphant state, He rises Victor from death's gate. Hell's pains are loosed, and tears are fled; captivity is captive led; the Angel, crowned with light, hath said, 'The Lord is risen from the dead.'
5. Tristes erant apostoli de nece sui Domini, quem poena mortis crudeli servi damnarant impii.: 6. Sermone blando angelus praedixit mulieribus, "In Galilaea Dominus videndus est quantocius": 7. Illae dum pergunt concite apostolis hoc dicere, videntes eum vivere osculant pedes Domini.: 8. Quo agnito discipuli in Galilaeam propere; pergunt videre faciem desideratam Domini.	The Apostles' hearts were full of pain for their dear Lord so lately slain: that Lord his servants' wicked train with bitter scorn had dared arraign. With gentle voice the Angel gave the women tidings at the grave; 'Forthwith your Master shall ye see: He goes before to Galilee.' And while with fear and joy they pressed to tell these tidings to the rest, their Lord, their living Lord, they meet, and see his form, and kiss his feet. The Eleven, when they hear, with speed to Galilee forthwith proceed: that there they may behold once more the Lord's dear face, as oft before.
9. Claro paschali gaudio sol mundo nitet radio, cum Christum iam apostoli visu cernunt corporeo.: 10. Ostensa sibi vulnera in Christi carne fulgida, resurrexisse Dominum voce fatentur publica.: 11. Rex Christe clementissime, tu corda nostra posside, ut tibi laudes debitas reddamus omni tempore!	In this our bright and Paschal day the sun shines out with purer ray, when Christ, to earthly sight made plain, the glad Apostles see again. The wounds, the riven wounds he shows in that his flesh with light that glows, in loud accord both far and nigh the Lord's arising testify. O Christ, the King who lovest to bless, do thou our hearts and souls possess; to thee our praise that we may pay, to whom our laud is due for aye.
12. Deo patri sit gloria eiusque soli filio; cum spiritu paraclito et nunc et in perpetuum.
