= Aeterne rerum conditor =

Aeterne rerum conditor (English "Eternal Maker of all") is an early Christian hymn among those attributed to Ambrose of Milan.

A dawn hymn, the hymn refers to Lucifer, the Morning Star, Christ, following 2 Peter 1:19 "until the day dawns and the morning star arises in your hearts". The hymn, as in the Vulgate of 2 Peter, employs the Latin noun "lucifer" to refer to "the Bringer of Light". Lines 15-16 refer to the denial of Peter.

The poem is written in the iambic tetrameter metre. The lines form couplets, each couplet having the rhythm | u – u – | u – u – || u – u – | u – u – |.

Aeterne rerum conditor,
noctem diemque qui regis,
et temporum das tempora,
ut alleves fastidium;

Praeco diei iam sonat,
noctis profundae pervigil,
nocturna lux viantibus
a nocte noctem segregans.

Hoc excitatus lucifer
solvit polum caligine,
hoc omnis erronum chorus
vias nocendi deserit.

Hoc nauta vires colligit
pontique mitescunt freta,
hoc ipsa petra ecclesiae
canente culpam diluit.

Surgamus ergo strenue!
gallus iacentes excitat,
et somnolentos increpat,
gallus negantes arguit.

gallo canente spes redit,
aegris salus refunditur,
mucro latronis conditur,
lapsis fides revertitur.

Iesu, labantes respice,
et nos videndo corrige,
si respicis, lapsi stabunt,
fletuque culpa solvitur.

Tu lux refulge sensibus,
mentisque somnum discute,
te nostra vox primum sonet
et ore psallamus tibi.

Sit, Christe, Rex piissime,
tibi Patrique gloria
cum Spiritu Paraclito,
in sempiterna saecula. Amen.

Eternal Creator of all things,
who rulest the day and night,
and givest the times of times,
to relieve our weariness,

The herald of the day is now sounding,
who keeps watch through the depth of night;
a nocturnal light for travellers,
separating night from night.

Woken by this, the Light-Bringer
releases the heaven from darkness;
by this, all the choir of sinners
deserts the ways of doing harm.

By this, the sailor gathers strength,
and the waters of the sea grown calm;
the Rock itself of the Church, when this sings,
washes away its guilt

Let us therefore arise energetically!
The cock is rousing those who are sleeping
and is shouting at the somnolent;
the cock refutes those who deny.

When the cock crows, hope returns,
health is poured back into the sick,
the robber's sword is put away;
faith returns to those who have lapsed.

Jesus, look upon those who lapse,
and by Thy seeing us, correct us;
if Thou lookst, our sins will fall away
and our fault will be washed away by weeping.

Thou, the Light, shine on our senses,
and shake off the sleep of our mind;
let our voice call upon Thee first,
and with our mouth let us sing hymns to Thee.

To Thee, Christ, most pious King,
and to the Father be glory
together with the Spirit Paraclete
for eternal ages. Amen.

In the Roman Breviary of 1632, some small changes were made to the wording in stanzas 2, 3, 7 and 8.

== See also ==
- Ambrosian hymns
