= Te Deum =

Early Christian hymn of praise

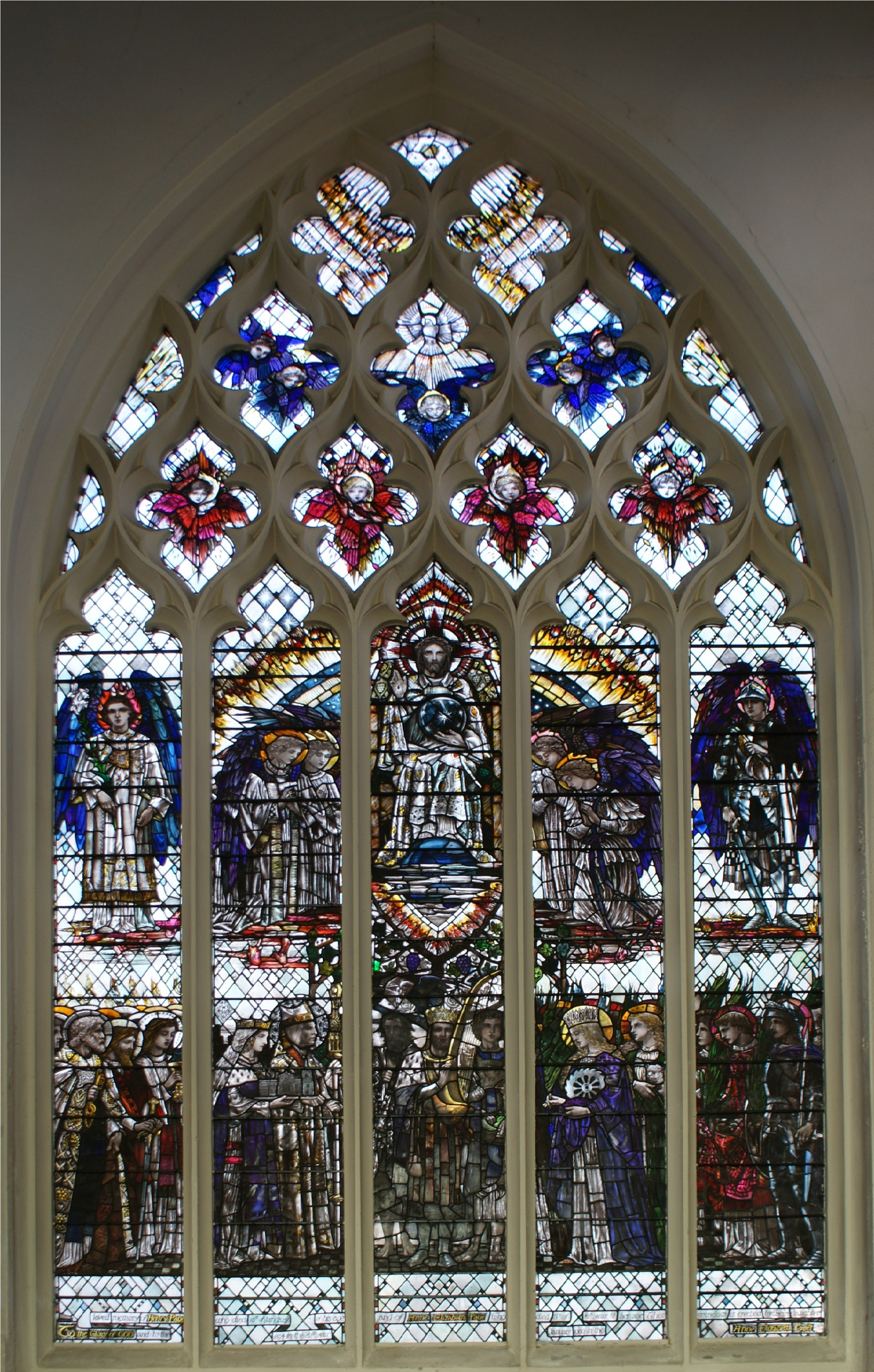
Te Deum stained glass window by Christopher Whall at St Mary's church, Ware, Hertfordshire

The Te Deum (/teɪ ˈdeɪəm/ or /tiː ˈdiːəm/, Latin: [te ˈde.um]; from its incipit, Te Deum laudamus, 'Thee, God, we praise') is a Latin Christian hymn traditionally ascribed to a date before AD 500, but perhaps with antecedents that place it much earlier. It is central to the Ambrosian hymnal, which spread throughout the Latin Church with other parts of the Ambrosian Rite of Milan in the 6th to 8th centuries. It is sometimes known as the Ambrosian Hymn, although authorship by Saint Ambrose is unlikely. The term Te Deum can also refer to a short religious service (of blessing or thanks) that is based upon the hymn.

It continues in use in many contexts by several denominations. In particular it is the core of a short church service of thanksgiving held, often at short notice, traditionally held to celebrate good news such as a military victory, the signing of a peace treaty, or the birth of a royal child.

== History ==
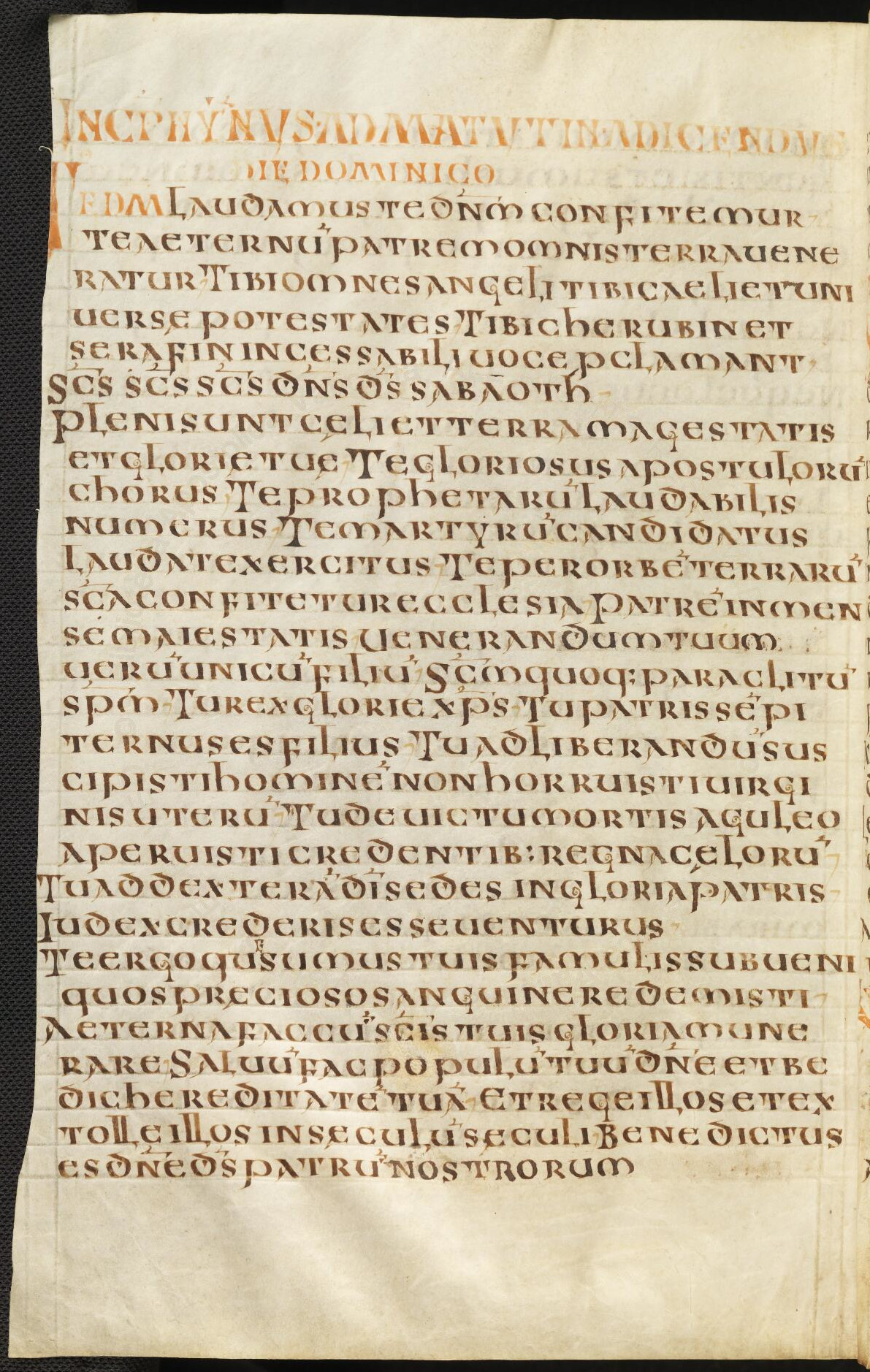
Vatican Reg. Lat. 11, fol. 230v (Frankish Hymnal, mid-8th century)

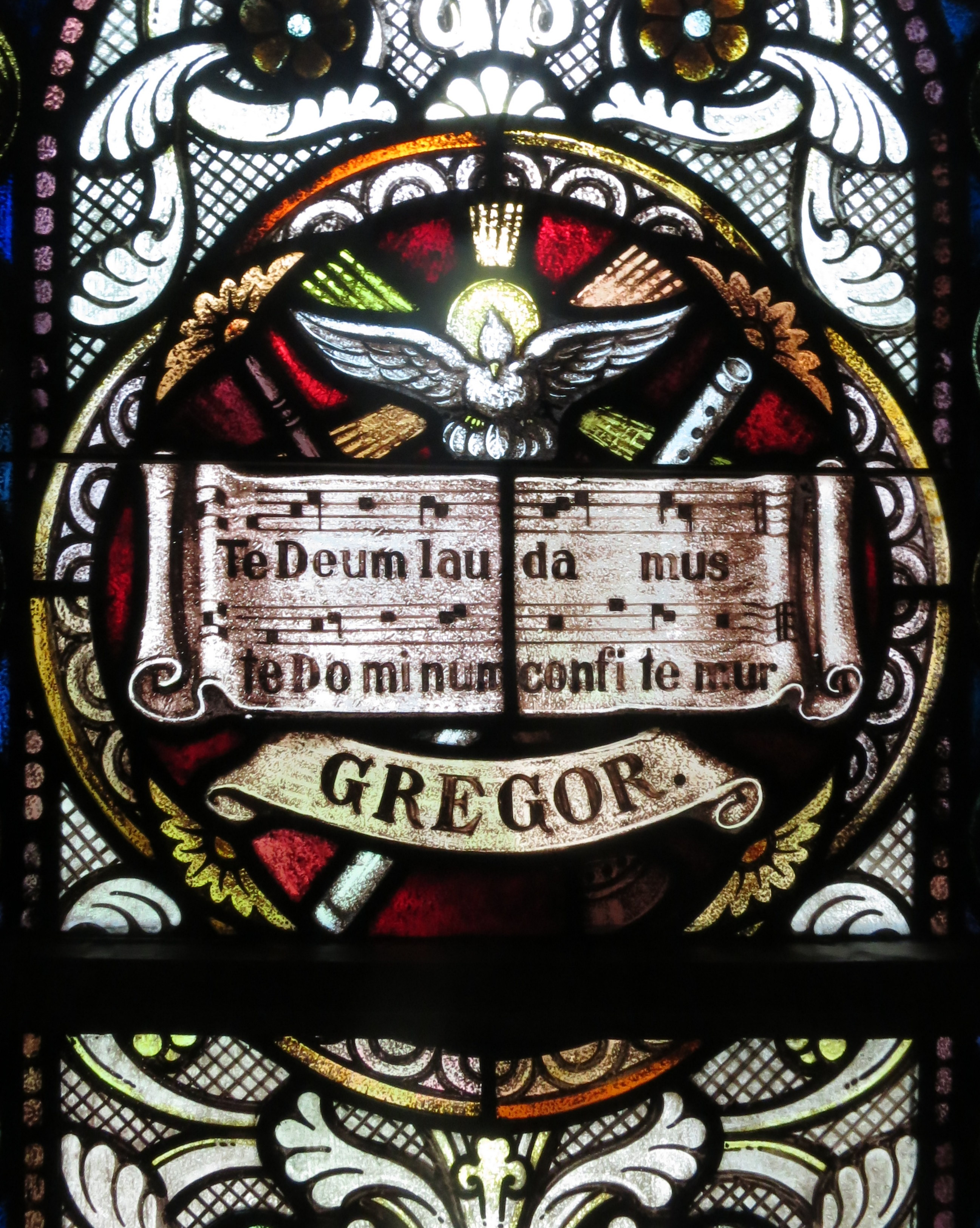
Te Deum on a stained glass window in the Sorrowful Mother Shrine Chapel (Bellevue, Ohio)

Authorship of the hymn is traditionally ascribed to Saint Ambrose (died 397) or Saint Augustine (died 430). In 19th-century scholarship, Saint Hilary of Poitiers (died 367) and Saint Nicetas of Remesiana (died 414) were proposed as possible authors. In the 20th century, the association with Nicetas has been deprecated, so that the hymn, while almost certainly dating to the 4th century, is considered as being of uncertain authorship. Authorship of Nicetas of Remesiana was suggested by the association of the name "Nicetas" with the hymn in manuscripts from the 10th century onward, and was particularly defended in the 1890s by Germain Morin. Hymnologists of the 20th century, especially Ernst Kähler (1958), have shown the association with "Nicetas" to be spurious. The Te Deum has structural similarities with a eucharistic prayer and it has been proposed that it was originally composed as part of one.

The hymn was part of the Old Hymnal since it was introduced to the Benedictine order in the 6th century, and it was preserved in the Frankish Hymnal of the 8th century. It was, however, removed from the New Hymnal which became prevalent in the 10th century. It was restored in the 12th century in hymnals that attempted to restore the praiseful intent of the Rule of St. Benedict, Chap. 12: How the Morning Office Is to Be Said.

In the traditional office, the Te Deum is sung at the end of Matins on all days when the Gloria is said at Mass; those days are all Sundays outside Advent, Septuagesima, Lent, and Passiontide; on all feasts (except the Triduum) and on all ferias during Eastertide.

Before the 1961 reforms of Pope John XXIII, neither the Gloria nor the Te Deum were said on the feast of the Holy Innocents, unless it fell on Sunday, as they were martyred before the death of Christ and therefore could not be presumed to immediately attain the beatific vision.

In the Liturgy of the Hours of Pope Paul VI, the Te Deum is sung at the end of the Office of Readings on all Sundays except those in Lent, on all solemnities, on the octaves of Easter and Christmas, and on all feasts. The revised Handbook of Indulgences (fourth edition) grants a plenary indulgence, under the usual conditions, to those who recite it in public on New Year's Eve.

In the Daily Office of the Catholic Ordinariates the Te Deum is sung at Morning Prayer as the Canticle following the First Lesson. It is appointed for (1) Sundays except in Pre-Lent and Lent, (2) Feasts and Solemnities, and (3) all days during the Octaves of Christmas, Easter, and Pentecost.

It is also used together with the standard canticles in Morning Prayer as prescribed in the Anglican Book of Common Prayer, as an option in Morning Prayer or Matins for Lutherans, and is retained by many churches of the Reformed tradition.

The hymn is in regular use in the Catholic Church, Lutheran Church, Anglican Church and Methodist Church (mostly before the Homily) in the Office of Readings found in the Liturgy of the Hours, and in thanksgiving to God for a special blessing such as the election of a pope, the consecration of a bishop, the canonization of a saint, a religious profession, the publication of a treaty of peace, a royal coronation, etc. It is sung either after Mass or the Divine Office or as a separate religious ceremony. The hymn also remains in use in the Anglican Communion and some Lutheran Churches in similar settings.

== Music and text ==
Originally, the hymn Te Deum was written on a Gregorian chant melody. The petitions at the end of the hymn (beginning Salvum fac populum tuum) are a selection of verses from the book of Psalms, appended subsequently to the original hymn.

The hymn follows the outline of the Apostles' Creed, mixing a poetic vision of the heavenly liturgy with its declaration of faith. Calling on the name of God immediately, the hymn proceeds to name all those who praise and venerate God, from the hierarchy of heavenly creatures to those Christian faithful already in heaven to the Church spread throughout the world.

The hymn then returns to its credal formula, naming Christ and recalling his birth, suffering and death, his resurrection and glorification. At this point the hymn turns to the subjects declaiming the praise, both the universal Church and the singer in particular, asking for mercy on past sins, protection from future sin, and the hoped-for reunification with the elect.

== Latin and English text ==
| Latin text | Translation from the Book of Common Prayer | Translation from ICEL (2020), as confirmed by the Holy See, 14 May 2020 Prot. No. 6/20 |
|---|---|---|
| Te Deum laudámus: te Dominum confitémur. | We praise thee, O God: we acknowledge thee to be the Lord. | O God, we praise you; O Lord, we acclaim you. |
| Te ætérnum Patrem omnis terra venerátur. | All the earth doth worship thee: the Father everlasting. | Eternal Father, all the earth reveres you. |
| Tibi omnes Angeli; tibi cæli et univérsae potestátes. | To thee all Angels cry aloud: the Heavens, and all the Powers therein. | All the angels, the heavens and the Pow'rs of heaven, |
| Tibi Chérubim et Séraphim incessábili voce proclámant: | To thee Cherubin and Seraphin: continually do cry, | Cherubim and Seraphim cry out to you in endless praise: |
| Sanctus, Sanctus, Sanctus, Dóminus Deus Sábaoth. | Holy, Holy, Holy: Lord God of Sabaoth; | Holy, Holy, Holy Lord God of hosts, |
| Pleni sunt cæli et terra majestátis glóriæ tuæ. | Heaven and earth are full of the Majesty: of thy glory. | heaven and earth are filled with the majesty of your glory. |
| Te gloriósus Apostolórum chorus; | The glorious company of the Apostles: praise thee. | The glorious choir of Apostles sings to you, |
| Te Prophetárum laudábilis númerus; | The goodly fellowship of the Prophets: praise thee. | the noble company of prophets praises you, |
| Te Mártyrum candidátus laudat exércitus. | The noble army of Martyrs: praise thee. | the white-robed army of martyrs glorifies you, |
| Te per orbem terrárum sancta confitétur Ecclésia: | The holy Church throughout all the world: doth acknowledge thee; | Holy Church throughout the earth proclaims you, |
| Patrem imménsæ majestátis; | The Father: of an infinite Majesty; | Father of boundless majesty, |
| Venerándum tuum verum et únicum Fílium; | Thine honourable, true: and only Son; | with your true and only Son, worthy of adoration, |
| Sanctum quoque Paráclitum Spíritum. | Also the Holy Ghost: the Comforter. | and the Holy Spirit, Paraclete. |
| Tu Rex glóriæ, Christe. | Thou art the King of Glory: O Christ. | You, O Christ, are the King of glory, |
| Tu Patris sempitérnus es Fílius. | Thou art the everlasting Son: of the Father. | you are the Father's everlasting Son; |
| Tu ad liberándum susceptúrus hóminem, non horruísti Vírginis úterum. | When thou tookest upon thee to deliver man: thou didst not abhor the Virgin's womb. | when you resolved to save the human race, you did not spurn the Virgin's womb; |
| Tu, devícto mortis acúleo, aperuísti credéntibus regna cælórum. | When thou hadst overcome the sharpness of death: thou didst open the Kingdom of Heaven to all believers. | you overcame the sting of death and opened wide the Kingdom of Heaven to those who put their faith in you. |
| Tu ad déxteram Dei sedes, in glória Patris. | Thou sittest at the right hand of God: in the glory of the Father. | You are seated at the right hand of God in the glory of the Father. |
| Judex créderis esse ventúrus. | We believe that thou shalt come: to be our Judge. | We believe you are the Judge who is to come. |
| Te ergo quǽsumus, tuis fámulis súbveni, quos pretióso sánguine redemísti. | We therefore pray thee, help thy servants: whom thou hast redeemed with thy precious blood. | And so we beg you, help your servants, redeemed by your most precious blood. |
| Ætérna fac cum sanctis tuis in glória numerári. | Make them to be numbered with thy Saints: in glory everlasting. | Number them among your saints in eternal glory. |
| [added later, mainly from Psalm verses:] Salvum fac pópulum tuum, Dómine, et bénedic hæreditáti tuæ. | [added later, mainly from Psalm verses:] O Lord, save thy people: and bless thine heritage. | [added later, mainly from Psalm verses:] Save your people, Lord, and bless your inheritance. |
| Et rege eos, et extólle illos usque in ætérnum. | Govern them: and lift them up for ever. | Shepherd them and raise them to eternal life. |
| Per síngulos dies benedícimus te. | Day by day: we magnify thee; | Day by day, we bless you |
| Et laudámus nomen tuum in sǽculum, et in sǽculum sǽculi. | And we worship thy Name: ever world without end. | and praise your name for endless ages evermore. |
| Dignáre, Dómine, die isto sine peccáto nos custodíre. | Vouchsafe, O Lord: to keep us this day without sin. | Be gracious, Lord, on this day, and keep us from all sin. |
| Miserére nostri, Dómine, miserére nostri. | O Lord, have mercy upon us: have mercy upon us. | Have mercy on us, O Lord, have mercy. |
| Fiat misericórdia tua, Dómine, super nos, quemádmodum sperávimus in te. | O Lord, let thy mercy lighten upon us: as our trust is in thee. | May your mercy be upon us, Lord, as we place our trust in you. |
| In te, Dómine, sperávi: non confúndar in ætérnum. | O Lord, in thee have I trusted: let me never be confounded. | In you, O Lord, I rest my hope: let me never be put to shame. |

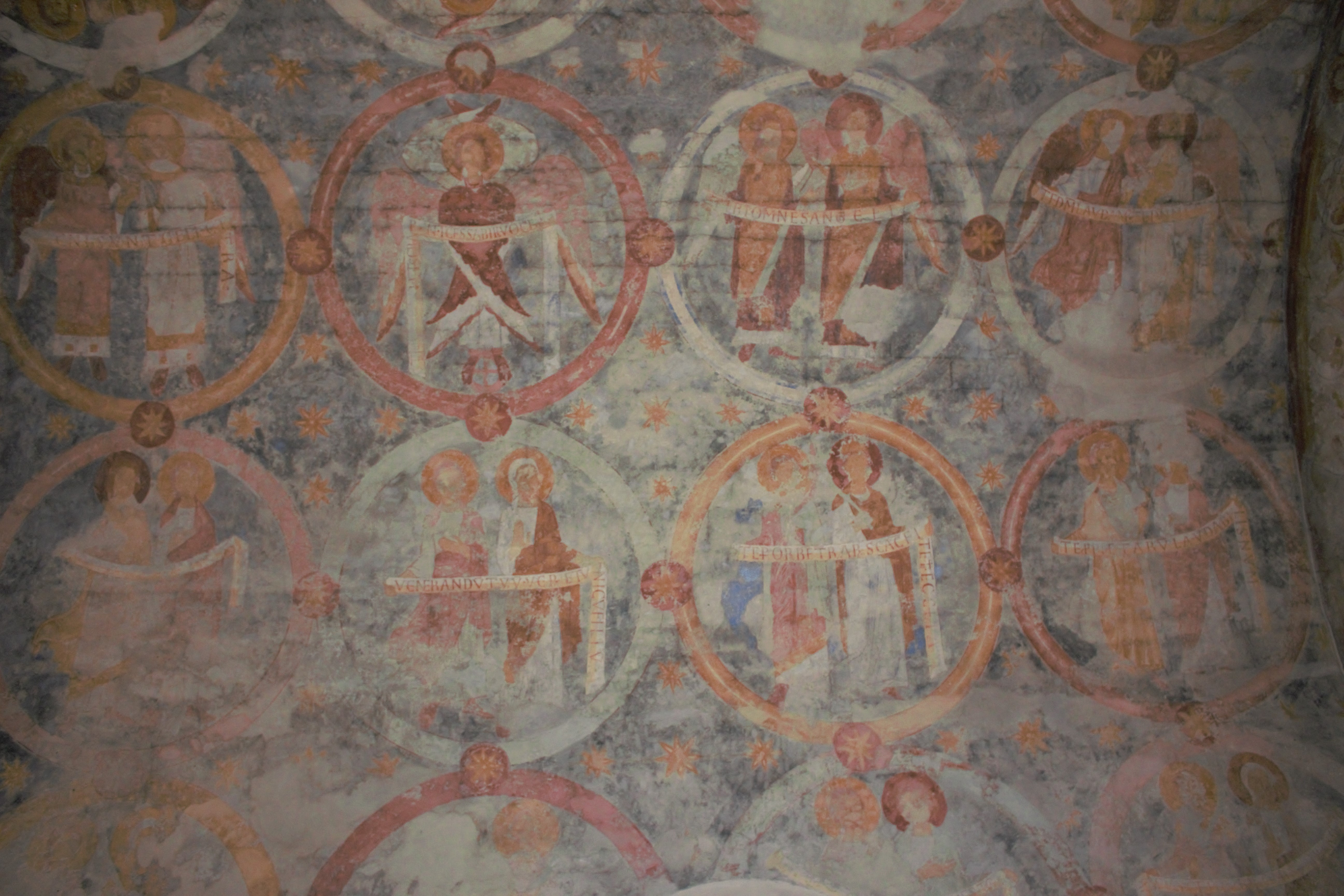
12th-century murals in Vä Church, Sweden, depicting angels and saints holding scrolls with the text of Te Deum

In the Book of Common Prayer, verse is written in half-lines, at which reading pauses, indicated by colons in the text.

== Indulgence ==
The Enchiridion Indulgentiarum of 2004 grants plenary or partial indulgence under certain circumstances.

== Service ==
A Te Deum service is a short religious service, based upon the singing of the hymn, held to give thanks. In Sweden, for example, it may be held in the Royal Chapel in connection with the birth of a prince or princess, christenings, milestone birthdays, jubilees and other important events within the royal family of Sweden.

In Belgium, a service is held annually in the presence of the royal family on 21 July, which is the date Leopold I of Belgium officially became king of the Belgians and is to this day the national holiday of Belgium.

In Luxembourg, a service is held annually in the presence of the grand-ducal family to celebrate the Grand Duke's Official Birthday, which is also the nation's national day, on either 23 or 24 June.

In the Autonomous Region of Madeira, the Bishop of Funchal holds a Te Deum service on 31 December of each year.

It is also celebrated in some South American countries such as Argentina, Chile, and Peru on their national days.

== Musical settings ==
Tonus Solemnis - Gregorian Chant

Te Deum (Charpentier)
Prelude to Charpentier's setting of Te Deum

The text has been set to music by many composers, with settings by Zelenka, Handel, Haydn, Mozart, Berlioz, Verdi, Bruckner, Furtwängler, Dvořák, Britten, Kodály, and Pärt among the better known. Jean-Baptiste Lully wrote a setting of Te Deum for the court of Louis XIV of France, and received a fatal injury while conducting it. Michel Richard de Lalande wrote a setting of the Te Deum, S.32. The prelude to Marc-Antoine Charpentier's setting (H.146) is well known in Europe on account of its being used as the theme music for Eurovision network broadcasts of the European Broadcasting Union, most notably the Eurovision Song Contest and Jeux Sans Frontières. He wrote also three other settings of the Te Deum: H.145, H.147, H.148. Henry Desmarets, two settings of Te Deum (1687). Louis-Nicolas Clérambault wrote three settings of the Te Deum: C.137, C.138, C.155. Earlier it had been used as the theme music for Bud Greenspan's documentary series, The Olympiad. Sir William Walton's Coronation Te Deum was written for the coronation of Queen Elizabeth II in 1953. Other English settings include those by Thomas Tallis, William Byrd, Henry Purcell, Edward Elgar, Richard St. Clair and Herbert Howells, as well as five settings by George Frideric Handel, three settings by Charles Villiers Stanford, two settings by Arthur Sullivan, and two settings by Ralph Vaughan Williams.

Giacomo Puccini's opera Tosca features a dramatic performance of the initial part of the Te Deum at the end of Act I.

The traditional chant melody was the basis for elaborate Te Deum compositions by notable French composer organists, Louis Marchand, Guillaume Lasceux, Charles Tournemire (1930), Jean Langlais (1934), and Jeanne Demessieux (1958), which are still widely performed today.

A version by Father Michael Keating is popular in some Charismatic circles. Mark Hayes wrote a setting of the text in 2005, with Latin phrases interpolated amid primarily English lyrics. In 1978, British hymnodist Christopher Idle wrote God We Praise You, a version of the text in 8.7.8.7.D meter, set to the tune Rustington. British composer John Rutter has composed two settings of this hymn, one entitled Te Deum and the other Winchester Te Deum. Igor Stravinsky set the first 12 lines of the text as part of The Flood in 1962. Antony Pitts was commissioned by the London Festival of Contemporary Church Music to write a setting for the 2011 10th Anniversary Festival. The 18th-century German hymn Großer Gott, wir loben dich is a free translation of the Te Deum, which was translated into English in the 19th century as "Holy God, We Praise Thy Name."

American composer Marie Pooler wrote Analyses of Choral Settings of the Te Deum by the Contemporary Composers Benjamin Britten, Leo Sowerby, Halsey Stevens, and Vincent Persichetti for her master’s thesis at California State University Fullerton.

- Te Deum by Prince Albert of Saxe-Coburg and Gotha
- Te Deum by Hector Berlioz
- Te Deum by Gilles Binchois
- Te Deum (1878) by Georges Bizet, for soprano, tenor, mixed choir and orchestra
- Te Deum by Walter Braunfels
- Te Deum Laudamus, the second part of Symphony No. 1 in D minor ("Gothic") (1919–1927) by Havergal Brian
- Two settings by Benjamin Britten: Te Deum in C (1934) and Festival Te Deum (1944)
- Te Deum by Anton Bruckner
- Te Deum H.145 (1670), Te Deum H.146 (1690), Te Deum H.147 (1690), Te Deum H.148 (1698–99) by Marc-Antoine Charpentier
- Te Deum from Paris & Te Deum from Lyon by Henri Desmarets
- Te Deum for Great Chorus C.138, Te Deum C.137, Te Deum C.155 by Louis-Nicolas Clérambault
- Te Deum by Antonín Dvořák
- Te Deum by Charles-Hubert Gervais (1721)
- Te Deum by François Giroust (1782)
- Te Deum by Charles Gounod
- Utrecht Te Deum and Jubilate (1713), Queen Caroline Te Deum (1714), Chandos Te Deum (1718), Te Deum (1726), Dettingen Te Deum (1743) by George Frideric Handel
- Te Deum by Johann Adolph Hasse
- Te Deum Hob. XXIIIc:1 and Hob. XXIIIc:2 by Joseph Haydn
- Short Festival Te Deum by Gustav Holst
- Te Deum by Herbert Howells
- Te Deum by Élisabeth Jacquet de La Guerre EJG 50 (date ?)
- Te Deum by Johann Hummel
- Te Deum by Karl Jenkins
- Te Deum by George Karst
- Te Deum by Zoltán Kodály
- Te Deum by Michel-Richard de Lalande
- Te Deum from Morning Service in E-flat major by John Loretz
- Te Deum by Jean-Baptiste Lully (1677)
- Te Deum by James MacMillan
- Te Deum by Felix Mendelssohn
- Te Deum by Wolfgang Amadeus Mozart
- Te Deum by Arvo Pärt
- Te Deum by Krzysztof Penderecki
- Te Deum in Giacomo Puccini's Opera Tosca
- Te Deum by Antoine Reicha
- Te Deum by Peter Reulein
- Te Deum by John Milford Rutter
- Te Deum Laudamus by Richard St. Clair
- Te Deum by Charles Villiers Stanford
- Festival Te Deum and Te Deum Laudamus by Arthur Sullivan
- Te Deum, the final part of Quattro pezzi sacri by Giuseppe Verdi
- Coronation Te Deum by William Walton
- Te Deum, a central theme of the "Symphonie Antique," along with the Lauda Sion, by Charles-Marie Widor
- Te Deum in G (1928) and Te Deum in F (1937) by Ralph Vaughan Williams
- Te Deum by Jan Dismas Zelenka, two settings, ZWV 145 (1724) and ZWV 146 (1731)
