= Helmut Gneuss =

German literature scholar (1927–2023)

- Born: October 29, 1927; Berlin, Germany
- Died: February 26, 2023 (aged 95)
- Resting place: Eichenau cemetery
- Education: FU Berlin
- Known for: The Battle of Maldon
- Spouse: Mechthild Gretsch
- Scientific career
- Fields: Anglo-Saxon studies
- Workplaces: LMU Munich
- Thesis: Lehnbildungen und Lehnbedeutungen im Altenglischen (1953)
- Doctoral advisor: Bogislav von Lindheim

Helmut Gneuss (29 October 1927 – 26 February 2023) was a German scholar of Anglo-Saxon and Latin manuscripts and literature.

== Academic career ==
Gneuss was emeritus professor at LMU Munich, where he occupied the chair for English language from 1965 to 1997. He served as Visiting Professor of Anglo-Saxon at the University of North Carolina, Chapel Hill, 1974-75. He lived in Eichenau. He was a member of the Bavarian Academy of Sciences and Humanities, the British Academy, the Austrian Academy of Sciences, and the Medieval Academy of America.

== Publications ==
Gneuss's 1976 article on the Anglo-Saxon poem The Battle of Maldon is regarded as "a turning point" in the history of Maldon scholarship. Specifically, his extensive lexicographical study of the important word ofermod "proved beyond doubt" that it means "pride", settling an important question in the interpretation of the poem; in the words of Fred C. Robinson, "the poet's use of ofermod signals a criticism of Byrhtnoth's generalship."

His 1981 publication A preliminary list of manuscripts written or owned in England up to 1100 was described as the next milestone in Anglo-Saxon manuscript studies after Neil Ripley Ker's 1957 book Catalogue of manuscripts containing Anglo-Saxon. The "preliminary" list ("an indispensable tool and essential starting point for anyone interested in Anglo-Saxon literary culture") was followed in 2001 by an expanded and redefined book, Handlist of Anglo-Saxon Manuscripts: A List of Manuscripts and Manuscript Fragments Written or Owned in England up to 1100. The "impact and significance" of his Handlist was the subject of a 2008 Festschrift edited by Thomas N. Hall and Donald Scragg.

== Bibliography ==
- A preliminary list of manuscripts written or owned in England up to 1100. Cambridge: Cambridge UP. 1981.
- Handlist of Anglo-Saxon Manuscripts: A List of Manuscripts and Manuscript Fragments Written or Owned in England up to 1100. Medieval and Renaissance Texts and Studies. Vol. 241. Tempe: Arizona Center for Medieval and Renaissance Studies. 2001. ISBN 978-0-86698-283-2.
