= Beltany =

Beltany may refer to:

- Beltany, County Tyrone, two townlands in County Tyrone, Northern Ireland
- Beltany, County Donegal, a townland in County Donegal, Ireland
- Beltany stone circle, a Neolithic stone circle in County Donegal, Ireland
- Beltany, an alternative spelling of the Beltane Gaelic May Day festival
