= Summer =

Hottest of the four temperate seasons

Temperate season
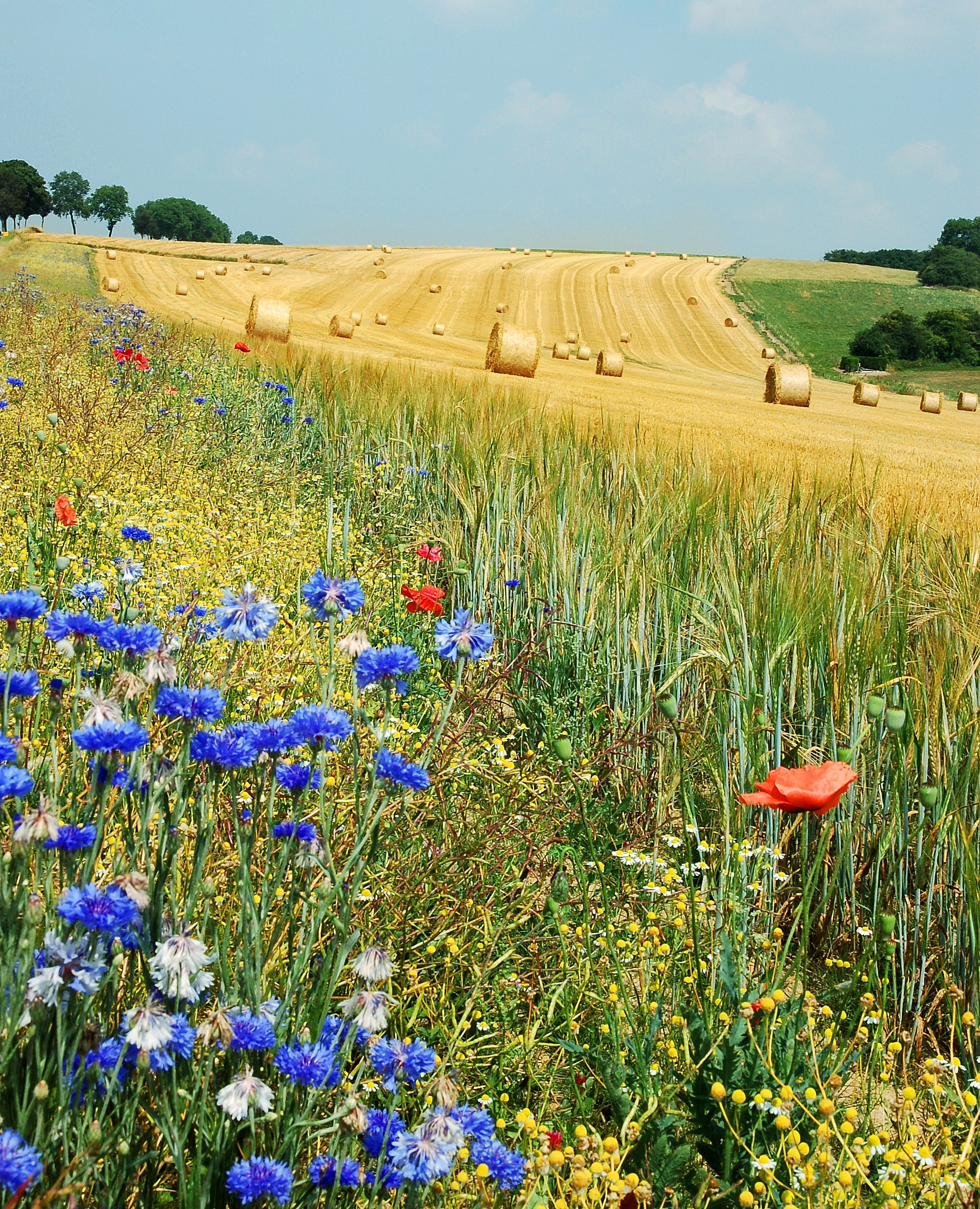
- Summer in Belgium

Northern temperate zone
- Astronomical season: 21 June – 22 September
- Meteorological season: 1 June – 31 August
- Solar (Celtic) season: 1 May – 31 July

Southern temperate zone
- Astronomical season: 22 December – 21 March
- Meteorological season: 1 December – 28/29 February
- Solar (Celtic) season: 1 November – 31 January
- Summer; Spring Autumn; Winter

Summer or summertime is the hottest and brightest of the four temperate seasons, occurring after spring and before autumn. Starting on (or around) the summer solstice, daylight hours are the longest and darkness hours are the shortest, with day length decreasing as the season progresses after the solstice. In the Northern Hemisphere, summer is usually defined as starting on June 21 or 22, and ending on September 22 or 23; and in the Southern Hemisphere, as the period between December 22 or 23 and March 20 or 21.

The earliest sunrises and latest sunsets also occur near the date of the solstice. The date of the beginning of summer varies according to definition, climate, tradition, and culture. When it is summer in the Northern Hemisphere, it is winter in the Southern Hemisphere, and vice versa.

== Etymology ==
The modern English summer derives from the Middle English somer, via the Old English sumor.

== Timing ==
=== Meteorological reckoning ===
The meteorological convention defines summer as comprising the months of June, July, and August in the northern hemisphere and the months of December, January, and February in the southern hemisphere. Under meteorological definitions, all seasons are arbitrarily set to start at the beginning of a calendar month and end at the end of a month. This meteorological definition of summer also aligns with the commonly viewed notion of summer as the season with the longest (and warmest) days of the year, in which daylight predominates.

The meteorological reckoning of seasons is used in countries including Australia, New Zealand, Austria, Denmark, Russia and Japan. It is also used by many people in the United Kingdom and Canada. In Ireland, the summer months according to the national meteorological service, Met Éireann, are June, July and August.

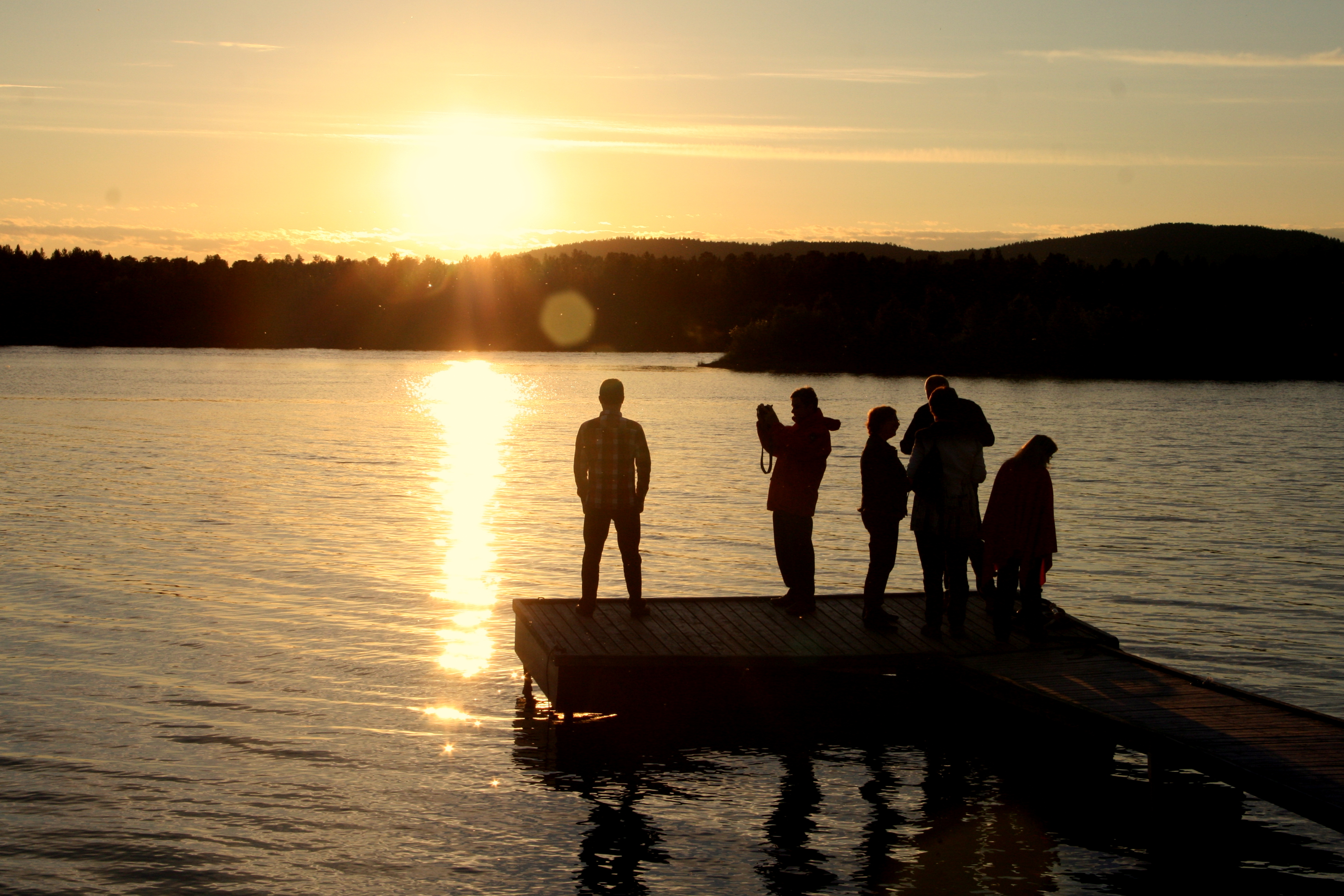
During summer in the polar regions, the sun can appear even at midnight. Photo of midnight sun in Inari, Finland.

Days continue to lengthen from equinox to solstice and summer days progressively shorten after the solstice, so meteorological summer encompasses the build-up to the longest day and a diminishing thereafter, with summer having many more hours of daylight than spring. Reckoning by hours of daylight alone, summer solstice marks the midpoint, not the beginning, of the seasons. Midsummer takes place over the shortest night of the year, which is the summer solstice, or on a nearby date that varies with tradition.

A variable seasonal lag means that the meteorological midpoint of the season, which is based on average temperature patterns, occurs several weeks after the time of maximal insolation.

=== Cultural reckoning ===
In the Julian calendar used in the ancient Roman world, summer began on 9 May, its midpoint was the summer solstice on 24 June, and summer ended on 10 August.

Likewise, in Anglo-Saxon England, summer began on 9 May and its midpoint was the summer solstice or Midsummer, on 24 June. In England, 24 June continued to be called Midsummer Day and was one of the quarter days of the English calendar. Elsewhere in northern Europe, midsummer and the solstice were traditionally reckoned as the night of 23–24 June.

Traditionally, in much of Europe, summer began with May Day, and the time around the summer solstice was seen as the middle of summer. In Gaelic Ireland and Scotland, summer began with the festival of Bealtaine on 1 May and ended with Lughnasa on 1 August. Likewise, in Wales, summer began with the festival of Cyntefin or Calan Haf (meaning "first of Summer") on 1 May.

Reckoning by cultural festivals, the summer season in the United States is traditionally regarded as beginning on Memorial Day weekend (the last weekend in May) and ending on Labor Day (the first Monday in September), more closely in line with the meteorological definition for the parts of the country that have four-season weather. The similar Canadian tradition starts summer on Victoria Day one week prior (although summer conditions vary widely across Canada's expansive territory) and ends, as in the United States, on Labour Day.

In some Southern Hemisphere countries such as Brazil, Argentina, South Africa, Australia and New Zealand, summer is associated with the Christmas and New Year holidays. Many families take extended holidays for two or three weeks or longer during summer.

In Australia and New Zealand, summer begins on 1 December and ends on 28 February (29 February in leap years).

In Chinese astronomy, summer starts on or around 5 May, with the jiéqì (solar term) known as lìxià (立夏), i.e. "establishment of summer". Summer ends around 7 August, with the solar term of lìqiū (立秋, "establishment of autumn").

In southern and southeast Asia, where the monsoon occurs, summer is more generally defined as lasting from March, April, May and June, the warmest time of the year, ending with the onset of the monsoon rains.

Because the temperature lag is shorter in the oceanic temperate southern hemisphere, most countries in this region use the meteorological definition with summer starting on 1 December and ending on the last day of February.

=== Astronomical reckoning ===
From an astronomical view, the equinoxes and solstices would be the middle of the respective seasons, but sometimes astronomical summer is defined as starting at the solstice, often identified with 21 June or 21 December. By solar reckoning, summer instead starts on around 5 May, ends around 7 August and the summer solstice is Midsummer. Where a seasonal lag of half a season or more is common, reckoning based on astronomical markers is shifted half a season. By this method, in North America, summer is the period from the summer solstice (usually 20 or 21 June in the Northern Hemisphere) to the autumn equinox.

== Weather ==
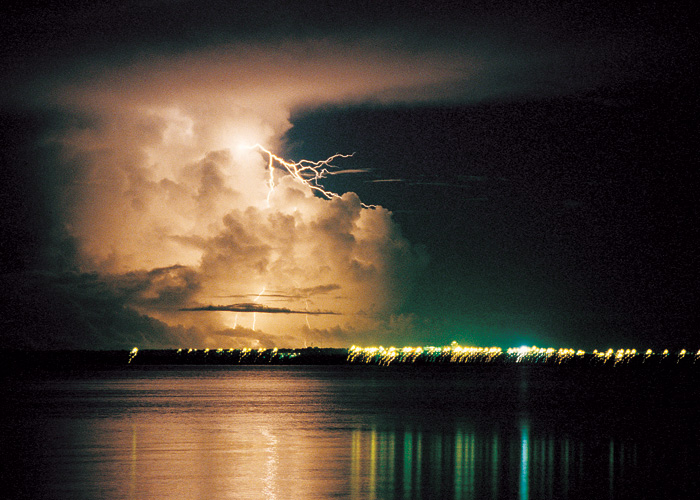
Wet season thunderstorm at night in Darwin, Northern Territory, Australia.

Summer is traditionally associated with hot or warm weather. In Mediterranean climates, it is also associated with dry weather, while in other places (particularly in Eastern Asia because of the monsoon) it is associated with rainy weather. The wet season is the main period of vegetation growth within the savanna climate regime. Where the wet season is associated with a seasonal shift in the prevailing winds, it is known as a monsoon.

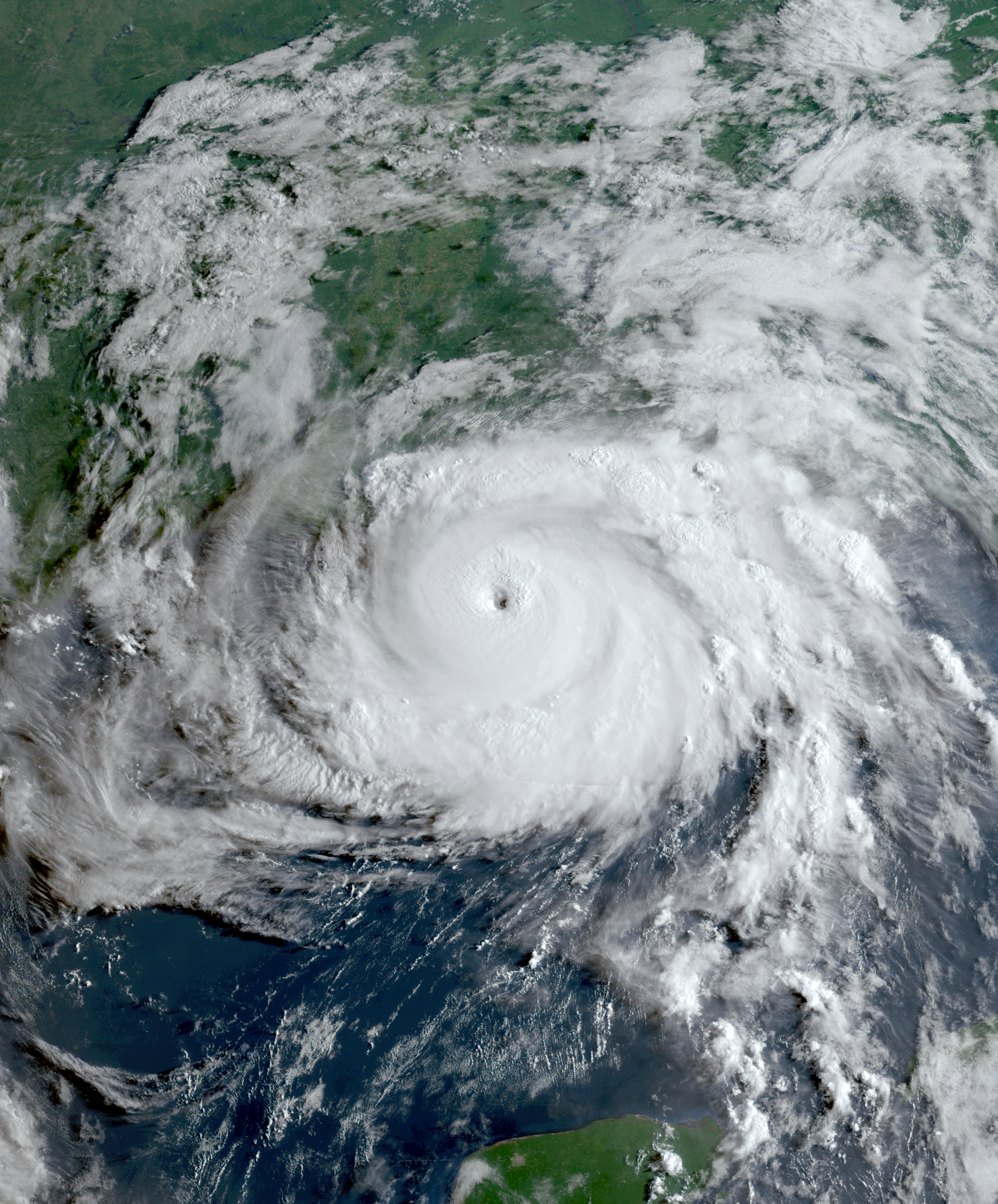
Image of Hurricane Ida from late August 2021.

In the northern Atlantic Ocean, a distinct tropical cyclone season occurs from 1 June to 30 November. The statistical peak of the Atlantic hurricane season is 10 September. The Northeast Pacific Ocean has a broader period of activity, but in a similar timeframe to the Atlantic. The Northwest Pacific sees tropical cyclones year-round, with a minimum in February and March and a peak in early September. In the North Indian basin, storms are most common from April to December, with peaks in May and November. In the Southern Hemisphere, the tropical cyclone season runs from the start of November until the end of April with peaks in mid-February to early March.

Thunderstorm season in the United States and Canada runs in the spring through summer but sometimes can run as late as October or even November in the fall. These storms can produce hail, strong winds and tornadoes, usually during the afternoon and evening.

== Holidays ==
=== School breaks ===
Schools and universities typically have a summer break to take advantage of the warmer weather and longer days. In almost all countries, children are out of school during this time of year for summer break, although dates vary. Many families will take holidays for a week or two over the summer, particularly in Southern Hemisphere Western countries with statutory Christmas and New Year holidays.

In the United States, public schools usually end in late May in Memorial Day weekend, while colleges finish in early May. Schools often resume in mid-August. Note that school start and end dates vary significantly across the US.

In England and Wales, school ends in mid-July and resumes again in early September. In Scotland, the summer holiday begins in late June and ends in mid-to-late August. Similarly, in Canada the summer holiday starts on the last or second-last Friday in June and ends in late August or on the first Tuesday of September, with the exception of when that date falls before Labour Day, in which case, ends on the second Tuesday of the month. In Russia, the summer holiday begins at the end of May and ends on 31 August.

In the Southern Hemisphere, school summer holiday dates include the major holidays of Christmas and New Year's Day. School summer holidays in Australia, New Zealand and South Africa begin in early December and end in early February, with dates varying between states. In South Africa, the new school year usually starts during the second week of January, thus aligning the academic year with the Calendar year. In India, school ends in late April and resumes in early or mid-June. In Cameroon and Nigeria, schools usually start a summer vacation in mid-July and resume in the later weeks of September or the first week of October.

=== Public holidays ===
A wide range of public holidays fall during summer, including:

- Northern Hemisphere
  - Bank holidays in the United Kingdom and Ireland
  - Bastille Day, National Day of France (14 July)
  - Belgian National Day (21 July)
  - Canada Day (1 July)
  - Festa della Repubblica, Italian national day and republic day (2 June)
  - Independence Day (Jordan) (25 May)
  - Independence Day (Pakistan) (14 August)
  - Independence Day (India) (15 August)
  - Independence Day (Indonesia) (17 August)
  - Independence Day (Malaysia) (31 August)
  - Independence Day (United States) (4 July)
  - Juneteenth (United States) (19 June)
  - King's Official Birthday (United Kingdom and some Commonwealth countries) (third Saturday in June)
  - Memorial Day (United States) or Victoria Day (Canada) through Labor Day
  - National Day of Singapore (9 August)
  - National Day of Sweden (6 June) and Midsummer, sometimes referred to as the "alternative National Day"
  - Ólavsøka, Faroe Islands (29 July)
  - Swiss National Day (1 August)
  - Victory Day (Turkey) (30 August)
- Southern Hemisphere
  - Australia Day (26 January)
  - Christmas Day (25 December) and Boxing Day (26 December) in many countries
  - New Year's Day (1 January) and the following day (2 January) in many countries
  - Waitangi Day (6 February) In New Zealand

== Activities ==
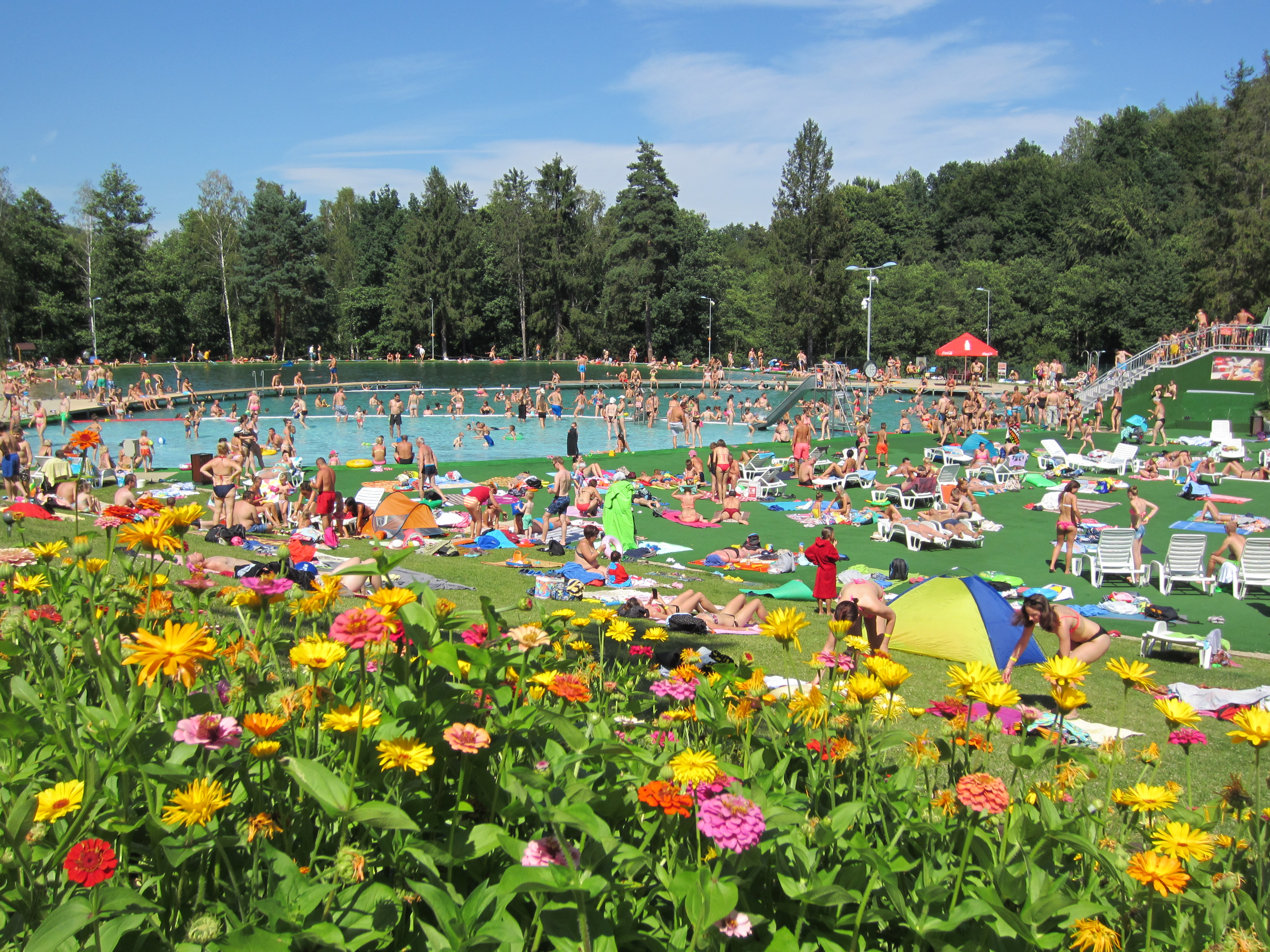
Summer is usually the season of travel, swimming, summer vacation for many people, and also the season for fruits and plants to fully develop.

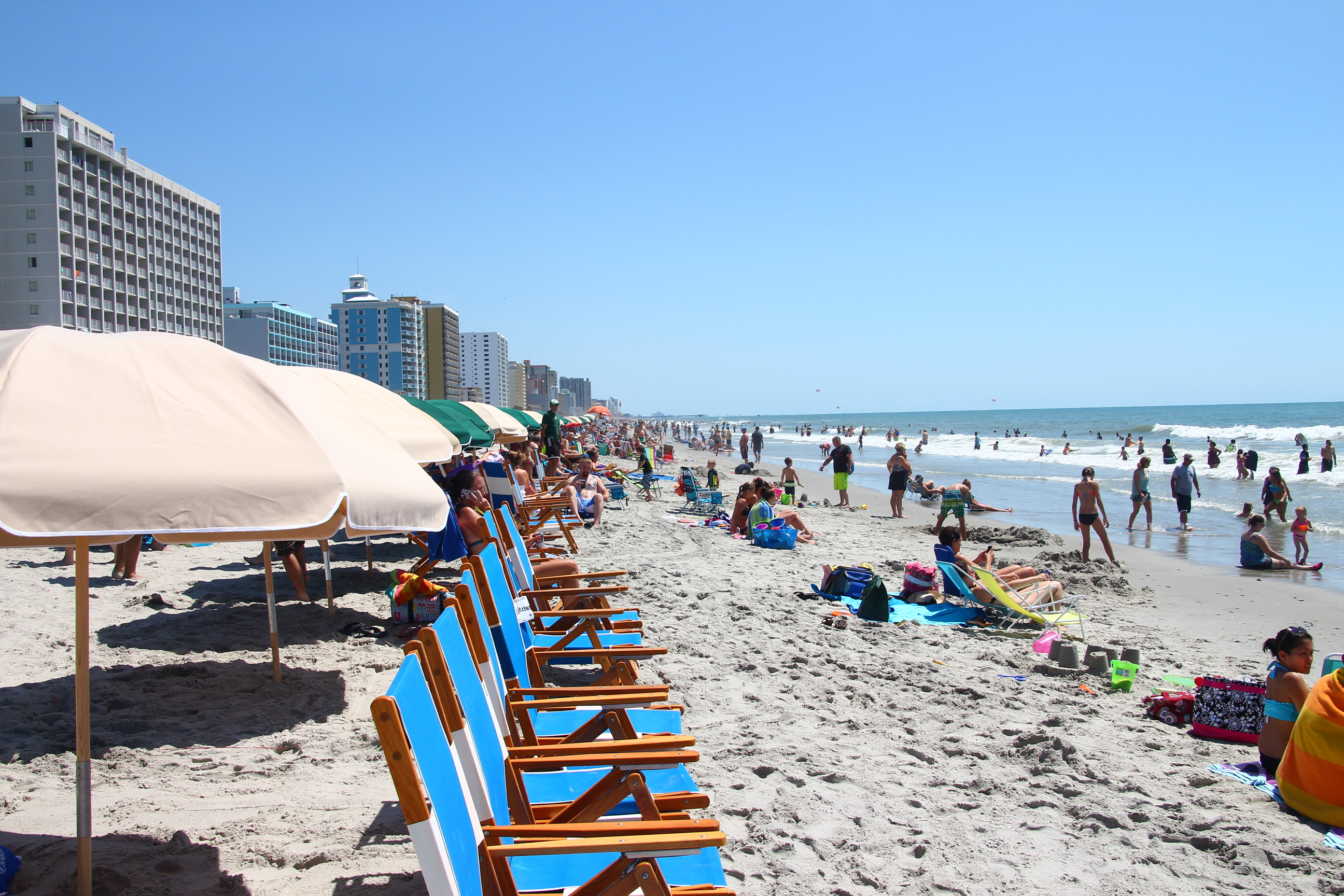
Hotels and tourists along the Atlantic Ocean shoreline in Myrtle Beach, South Carolina in summer

People generally spend more time outdoors during summer. Activities such as travelling to the beach and picnics occur during the summer months. Sports including cricket, association football (soccer), horse racing, basketball, American football, volleyball, skateboarding, baseball, softball, tennis and golf are played.

Water sports also occur. These include water skiing, wakeboarding, swimming, surfing, tubing and water polo. The modern Olympics have been held during the summer months every four years since 1896. The 2000 Summer Olympics, in Sydney, were held in spring and the 2016 Summer Olympics, in Rio de Janeiro, were held in winter.

In the United States, many television shows made for children are released during the summer, as children are off school.

Conversely, the music and film industries generally experience higher returns during the summer than other times of the year and market their summer hits accordingly.

With many schools closed, especially in Western countries, travel and vacationing tend to peak during the summer. Teenagers and university students often take summer jobs, and business activity for the recreation, tourism, restaurant, and retail industries reach their peak.

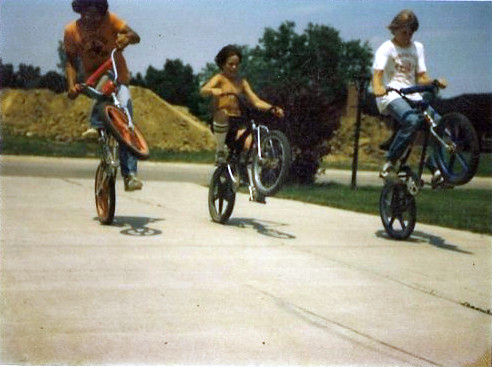
Children cycling during summer

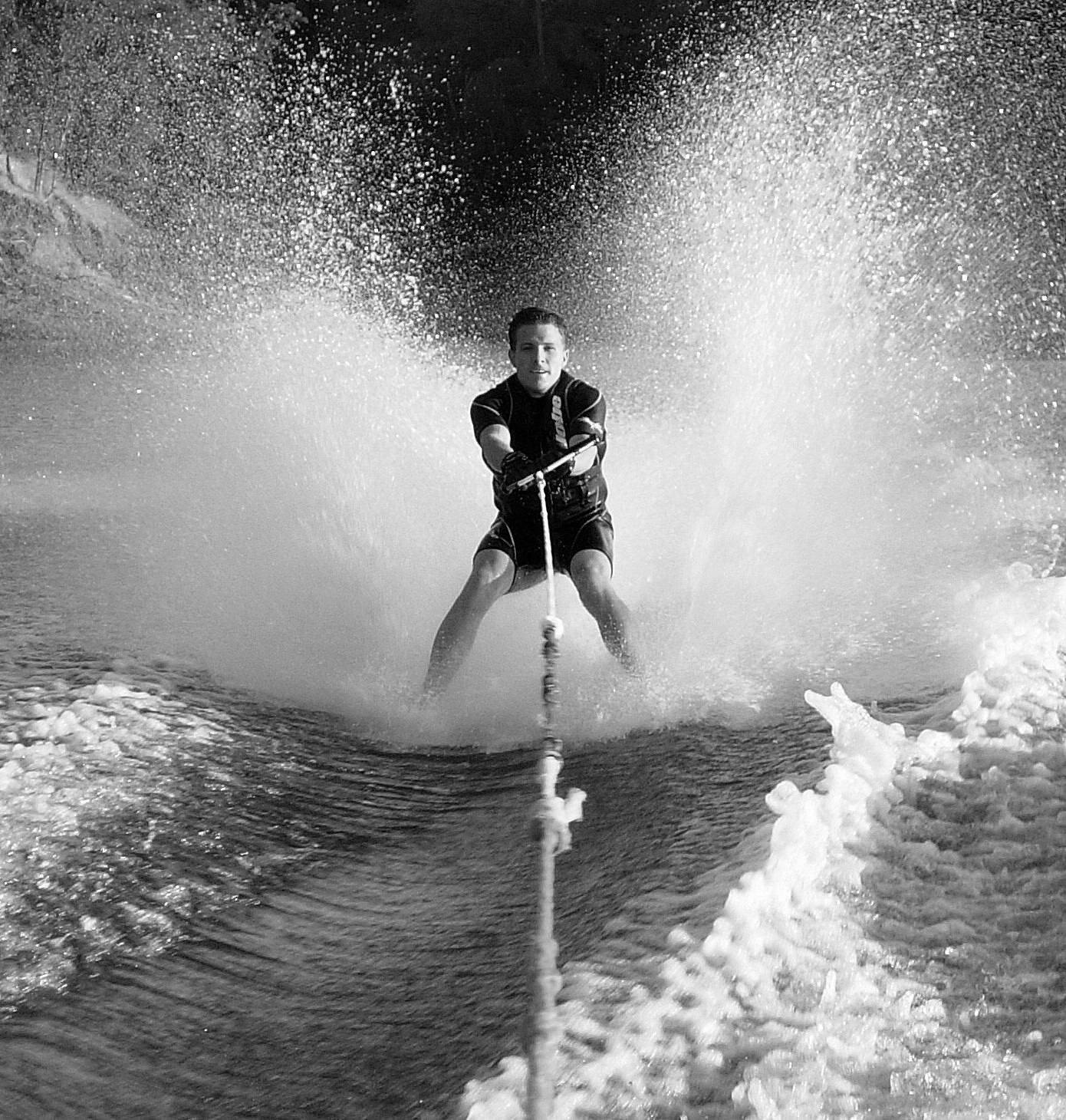
Barefoot skiing

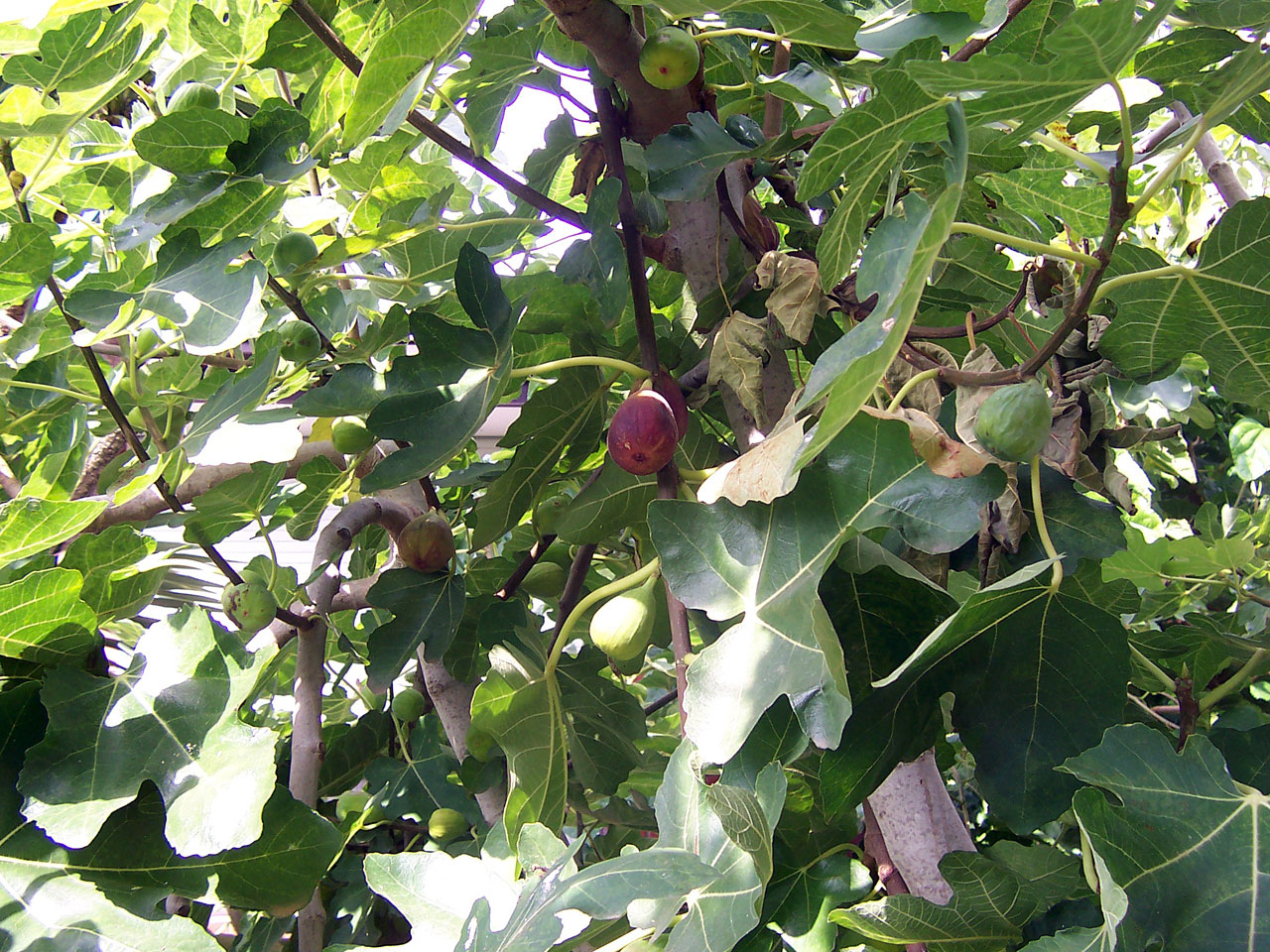
Fig trees bear fruit when summer is near

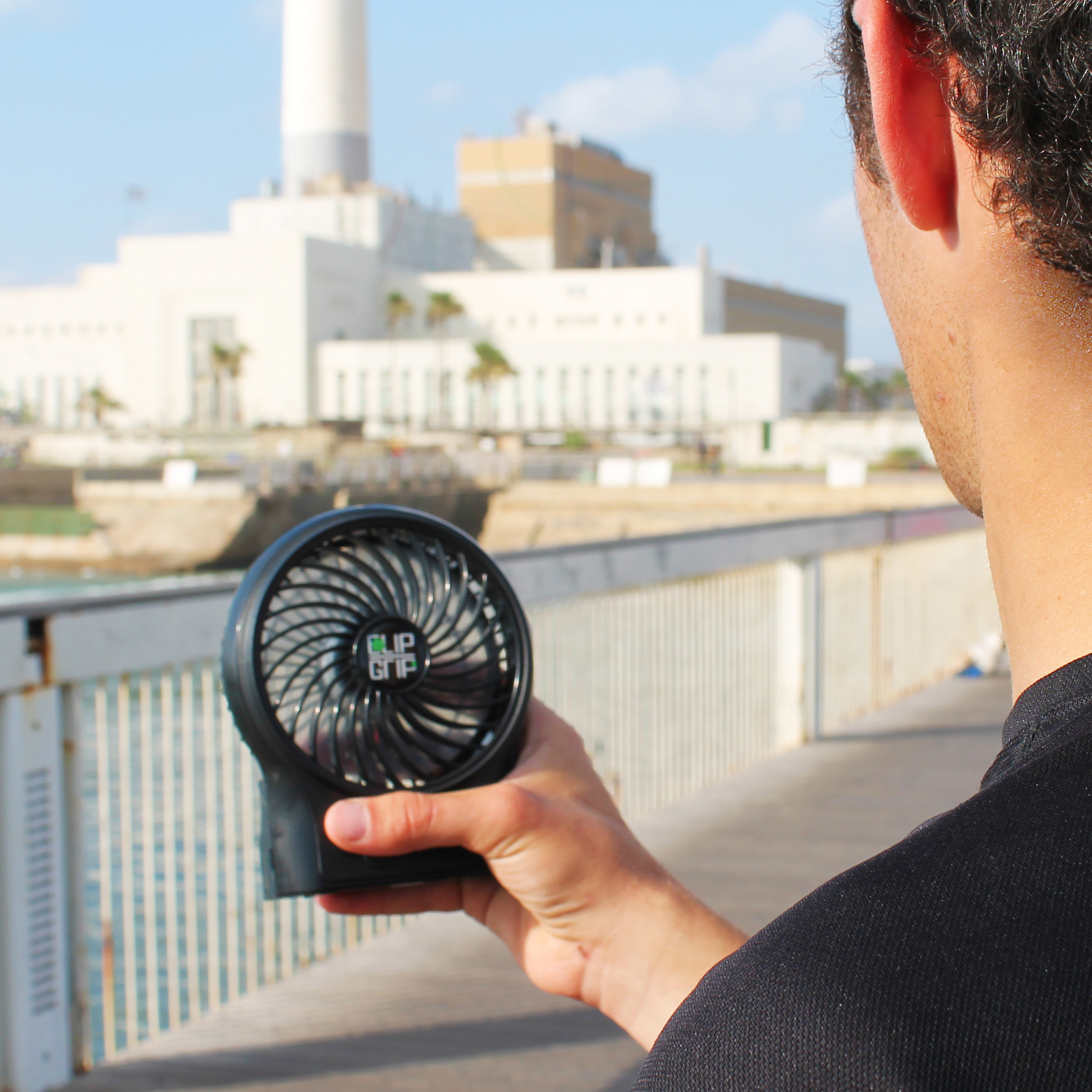
Using a handheld fan in summer

== See also ==
- Summer Olympic Games
- Summer War
