= Fairy fort =

Circular dwelling remains in Ireland

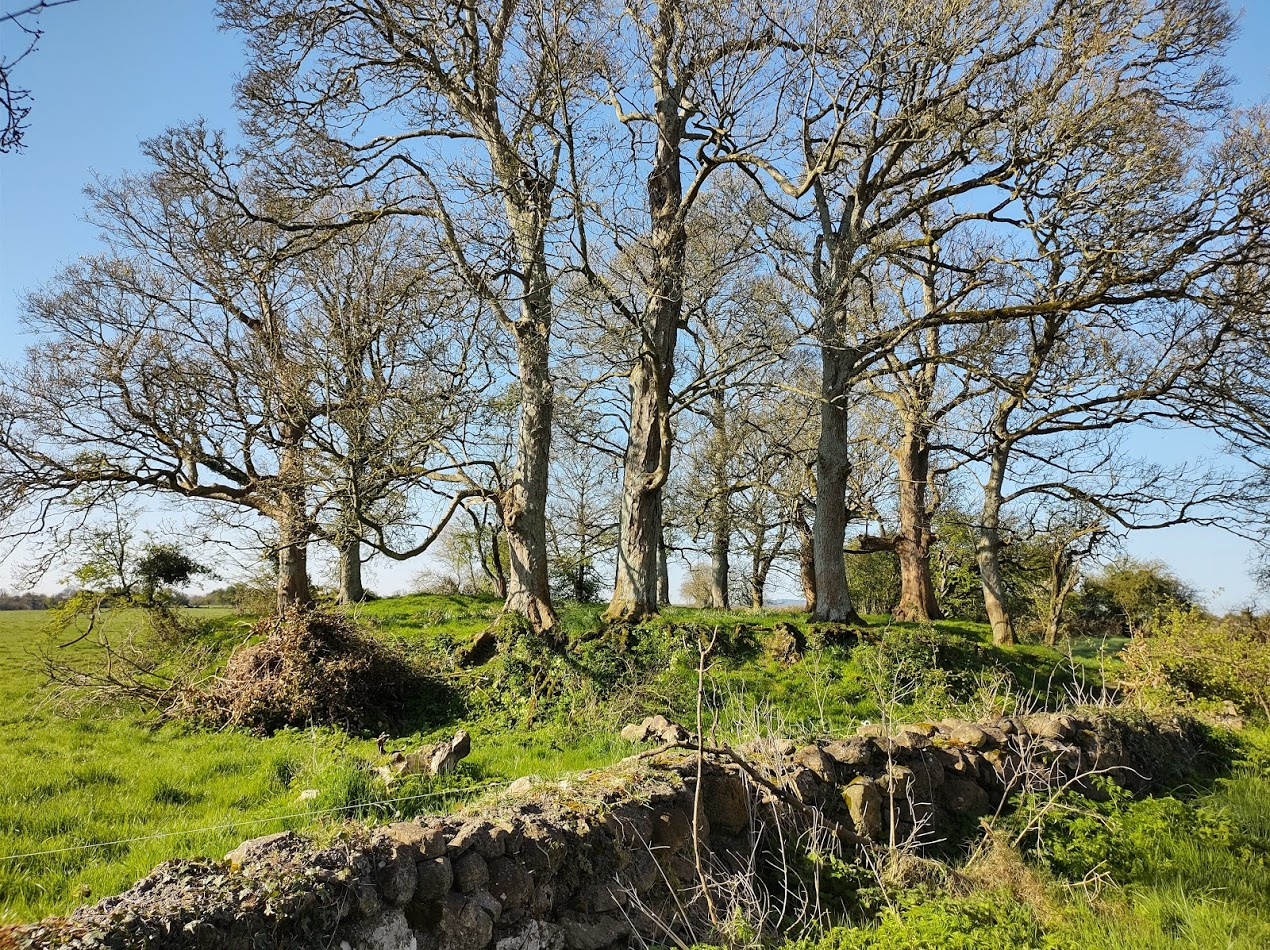
Ringfort (rath) at Knocknagranshy, County Limerick

Fairy forts (also known as lios or raths from the Irish, referring to an earthen mound) are the remains of stone circles, ringforts, hillforts, or other circular prehistoric dwellings in Ireland. From possibly the late Iron Age to early Christian times, people built circular structures with earth banks or ditches. These were sometimes topped with wooden palisades and wooden framed buildings. As the dwellings were not durable, only vague circular marks often remained in the landscape. The remains of these structures, in conjunction with the vegetation around them, are associated with local traditions and folklore, perhaps involving fairies or other supposed supernatural entities, who would "defend" the structures from destruction by builders or farmers.

As of 1991, there were between thirty and forty thousand identifiable fairy forts in Ireland's countryside, the oldest of them possibly dating back as early as 600 BCE.

== Interpretation ==
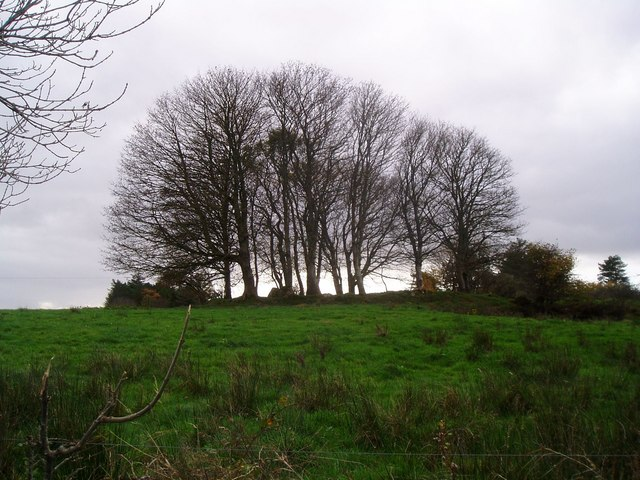
Ringfort at Cloonmung, County Mayo

Tradition claimed that ringforts were "fairy forts" imbued with druids' magic, and believers in the fairies did not alter them. The early pre-Celtic inhabitants of Ireland came to be seen as the mythical Tuatha Dé Danann and Fir Bolg. They were associated with stories of fairies – also known as the "Good People". Fairy forts and prehistoric tumuli were seen as entrances to their world. Even cutting brush, especially the sceach or whitethorn, on fairy forts was reputed to be the death of those who performed the act.

There are many folk tales about supernatural events happening at fairy forts. Actual accidents which occurred at ringforts could be given supernatural explanations. For example, a man who tried to blast a dolmen suffered a septic hand. The wrecked dolmen was subsequently left untouched.

Other traditions hold that a leprechaun may allegedly know of hidden gold in a fairy fort.

In literature, British author Rudyard Kipling made allusions to the process by which such legends grow in his 1906 novel, Puck of Pook's Hill.

== Folk tales ==
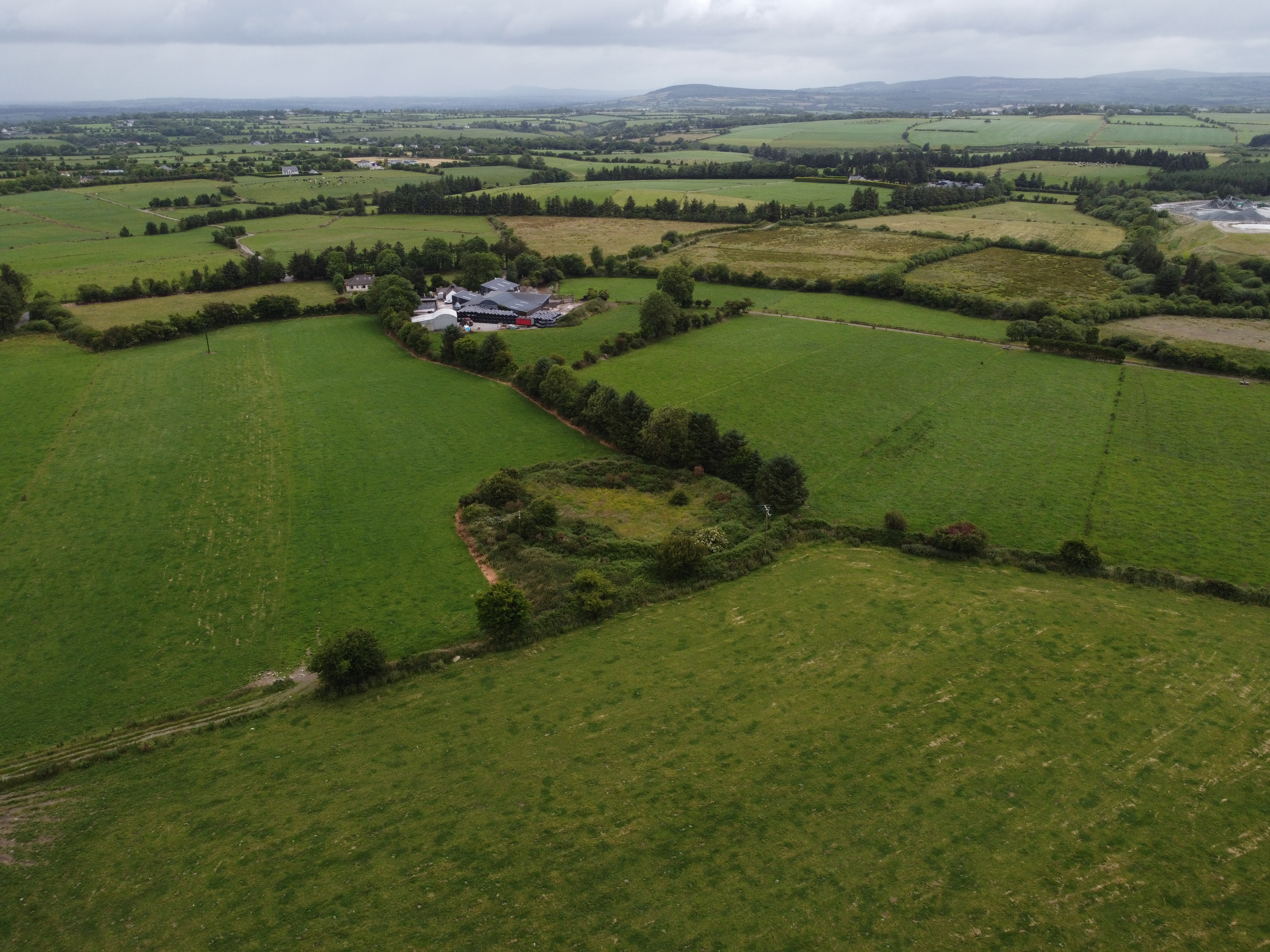
Fairy fort at Carrigcleena, near Mallow, County Cork

Folk tales associated with fairy forts typically relate a curse or retribution enacted upon those who would disturb or destroy the structures. For example, one story collected in 1907 tells that a man who had engaged workers to level an earthwork fairy fort at Dooneeva or Doonmeeve (near Lahinch in County Clare) fell dead; his wife, a wise woman, magically resurrected him unharmed.

Other folk tales relate to the taking of farm animals or people (typically women or children) by the reputed occupants of fairy forts.

In 1966, a man named Tim Hayes buried himself for 101 hours in a fairy fort to hear the earth sounds and prove that there were no fairies in fairy forts. He reiterated the exploit several times, once for over 239 hours in a fairy fort in Monamolin, County Wexford in June 1970.

In 2011, the financial ruin of Seán Quinn, formerly the richest person in Ireland, was blamed on his moving a fairy fort. Some also believed the same about the financial downfall of John DeLorean.

In 2007, Danny Healy-Rae suggested that the N22 remained in bad condition despite renovation work because it was built on a local network of fairy forts, while the Road Department talked about "a deeper underlying subsoil/geotechnical problem". The same issue rose up again in 2017.

== See also ==
- Brigit's Garden
- Early Irish literature
- Fairy path
- Fairy ring
