= Beltane =

Gaelic May Day festival

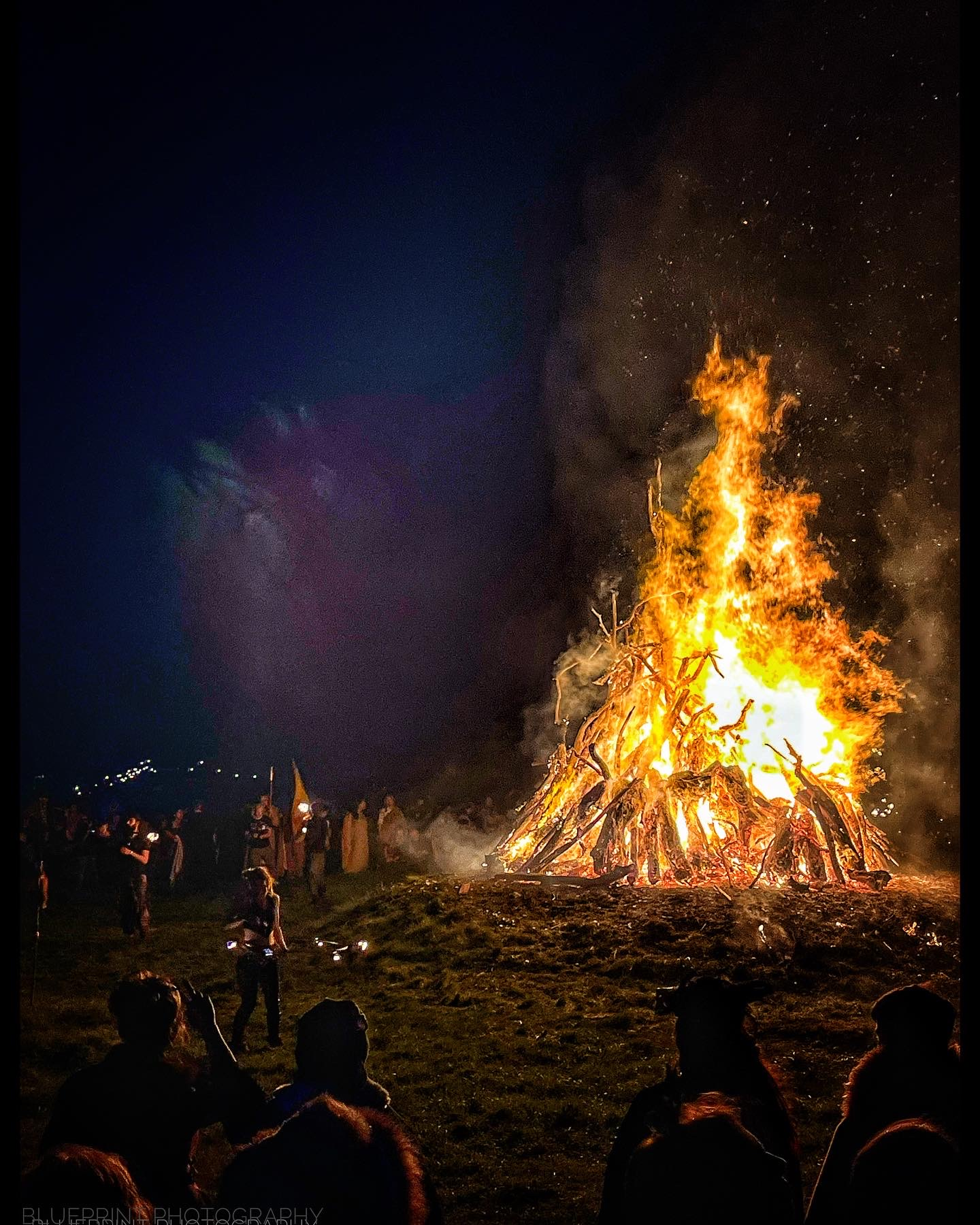
- Bealtaine bonfire at Uisneach, near Mullingar in County Westmeath, Ireland, in 2022
- Also called: Bealtaine (Irish); Bealltainn (Scottish Gaelic); Boaltinn/Boaldyn (Manx); Beltain; Beltine; Beltany
- Observed by: Historically: Gaels; Today: Irish people, Scottish people, Manx people, Modern Pagans
- Type: Cultural, Pagan (Celtic neopaganism, Wicca)
- Significance: Beginning of summer
- Celebrations: lighting bonfires, decorating homes with May flowers, making May bushes, visiting holy wells, feasting
- Date: 1 May (or 1 November for Neopagans in the Southern Hemisphere)
- Frequency: annual
- Related to: May Day, Calan Mai, Walpurgis Night

Bealtaine (Irish pronunciation: [ˈbʲal̪ˠt̪ˠənʲə]) or Beltane (/ˈbɛl.teɪn/ BEL-tayn) is the Gaelic May Day festival, marking the beginning of summer. It is traditionally held on 1 May, or about midway between the spring equinox and summer solstice. Historically, it was widely observed in Ireland, Scotland, and the Isle of Man. In Ireland, the name for the festival in both Irish and English is Lá Bealtaine ([l̪ˠaː ˈbʲal̪ˠt̪ˠənʲə]). In Scottish Gaelic it is Là Bealltainn ([l̪ˠaː ˈpjaul̪ˠt̪ɪɲ]), and in Manx Gaelic Boaltinn or Boaldyn. It is one of the four main Gaelic seasonal festivals—along with Samhain, Imbolc, and Lughnasadh—and is similar to the Welsh Calan Mai.

Beltane is mentioned in the earliest Irish literature and is associated with important events in Irish mythology. Also known as Cétshamhain (possibly 'first of summer'), it marked the beginning of summer and was when cattle were driven out to the summer pastures. Rituals were performed to protect cattle, people and crops, and to encourage growth. Special bonfires were kindled, whose flames, smoke and ashes were believed to have protective powers. The people and their cattle would walk around or between bonfires and sometimes leap over the flames or embers. All household fires would be doused and then relit from the Beltane bonfire.

These gatherings were accompanied by a feast, and some of the food and drink would be offered to the aos sí (the 'fairy folk'). Doors, windows, byres and livestock were decorated with yellow May flowers, perhaps because they evoked fire. In parts of Ireland, people made a May Bush: typically a thorn bush or branch decorated with flowers, ribbons, bright shells and rushlights. Holy wells were also visited, while Beltane dew was thought to bring beauty and maintain youthfulness. Many of these customs were part of May Day or Midsummer festivals in parts of Great Britain and mainland Europe, such as Germanic celebrations of Walpurgis Night.

Public celebrations of Beltane fell out of popularity by the 20th century, though some customs have been revived as local cultural events. Since the late 20th century, Celtic neopagans and Wiccans have observed a festival based on Beltane as a religious holiday. Neopagans in the Southern Hemisphere may mark the festival on 1 November.

== Name ==
In Old Irish, the name was usually Beltaine or Belltaine. In modern Irish, the festival is usually called Lá Bealtaine ("day of Beltane"), while the month of May is Mí Bhealtaine ("month of Beltane"). In Scottish Gaelic, the festival is Latha Bealltainn. Sometimes the older Scottish Gaelic spelling Bealltuinn is used. The term Latha Buidhe Bealltainn (Scottish) or Lá Buidhe Bealtaine (Irish), "the bright or yellow day of Beltane", means the first of May. In Ireland it is referred to in a common folk tale as Luan Lae Bealtaine; the first day of the week (Monday/Luan) is added to highlight the first day of summer.

The name is anglicised as Beltane, Beltain, Beltaine, Beltine and Beltany.

Another Old Irish name for the festival was Cétshamain or Cétamain, probably meaning 'first of summer'. Ó Duinnín's Irish dictionary (1904) gives this as Céadamhain or Céadamh in modern Irish. It survives in the Scottish Gaelic name for the month of May, An Cèitean, and matches the Welsh Cyntefin. These have all been derived from proto-Celtic *kentu-samonyos (first + summer).

=== Etymology ===
Two modern etymologies have been proposed. The first reconstructs Beltaine as *beltiniā, deriving it from a stem *beltu associated with 'death' (cf. Old Irish at·baill 'dies', epeltu < *eks-beltu 'dying'), from an earlier *gʷel-tiō(n), based on Proto-Indo-European *gʷel- 'suffering, death'. On this view, Beltaine would be cognate with the Lithuanian goddess of death Giltinė. The lack of expected syncope (Irish sound laws would predict **Beltne) has been explained as the result of a popular reinterpretation of Beltaine as a compound containing Old Irish tene ('fire'). However, Peter Schrijver says that this etymology is problematic, as it is unlikely the beginning of the fertile summer season would be associated with death, and it does not accord well with medieval accounts of kindling fires to guard against sickness. According to another etymology, Beltaine is a compound formed from the Proto-Indo-European root *bʰel- ('shine') and Old Irish tene ('fire'). Schrijver suggests that the element bel derives from an Indo-European word for henbane, a psychoactive plant used in herbal medicine.

Medieval Irish texts say that the name means "Bel's fire"; fire of the god Bel. This could be an Irish version of the Celtic god Belenos, but Bel is not mentioned anywhere else in early Irish literature and the texts include many fanciful etymologies.

=== Toponymy ===
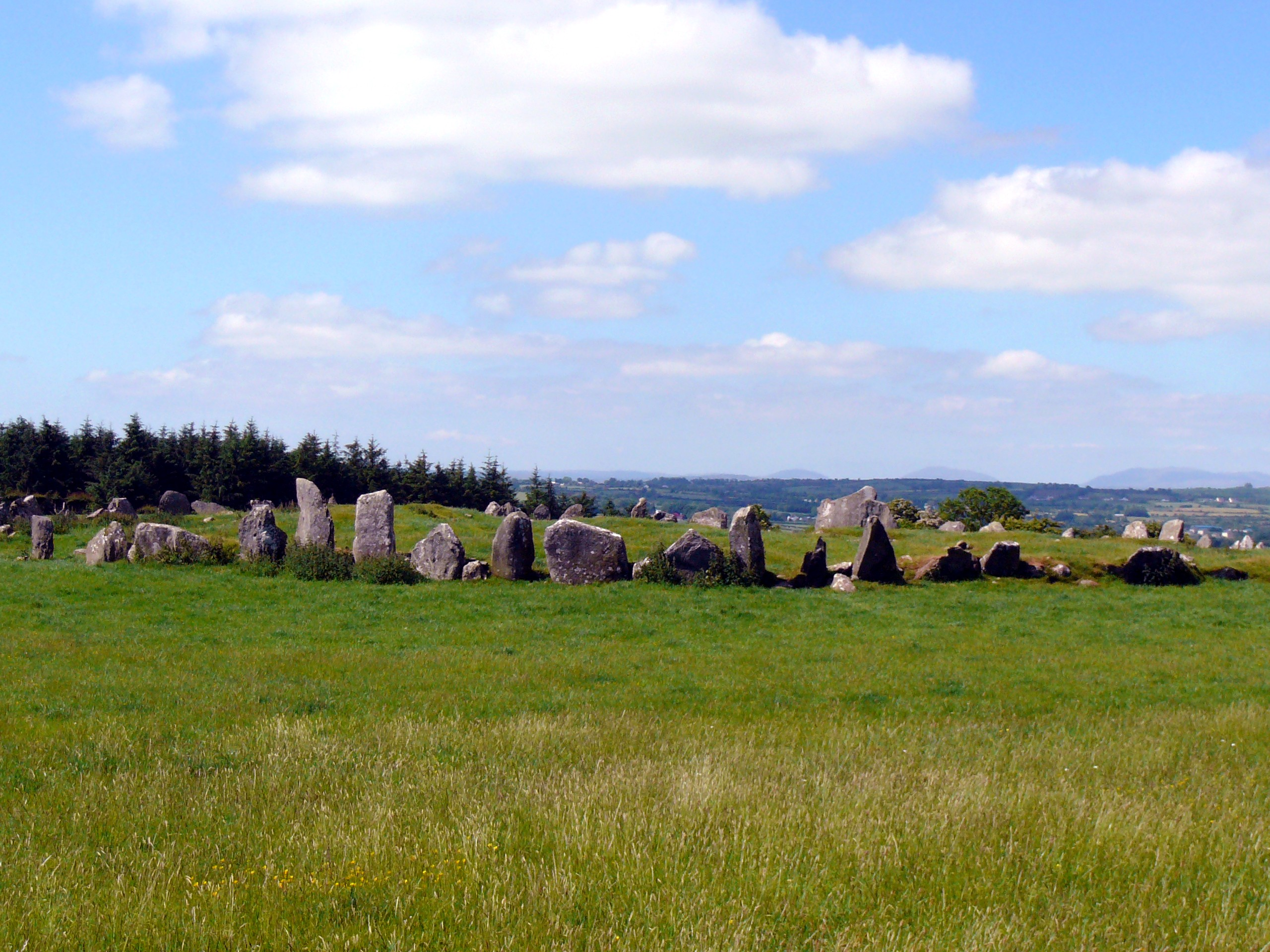
Beltany stone circle in Ireland

There are place names in Ireland containing the word Bealtaine, indicating places where Beltane festivities were once held. It is often anglicised as Beltany. There are three Beltanys in County Donegal, including the Beltany stone circle, and two in County Tyrone. In County Armagh there is a place called Tamnaghvelton/Tamhnach Bhealtaine ('the Beltane field'). Lisbalting/Lios Bealtaine ('the Beltane ringfort') is in County Tipperary, while Glasheennabaultina/Glaisín na Bealtaine ('the Beltane stream') is the name of a stream joining the River Galey in County Limerick.

== Origins ==
It is believed that Beltane originated as a pastoral festival associated with herders practising transhumance. This is where herders (sometimes with their families) moved with their cows and sheep to higher pastures during the summer months. It was once widespread in Ireland, where it was known as "booleying", as well as in Britain and other parts of Europe.

The ancient Roman festival of Parilia or Palilia had many similarities with Beltane. Around 21 April, before shepherds drove their flocks to the summer pastures, they carried out cleansing and protective rituals. Sheep folds were decorated with greenery, a bonfire was lit, the shepherds and their sheep leapt over burning embers, the shepherds drank a beverage they had brewed, and made offerings to the deity Pales. It suggests that the festivals, as well as similar May Day customs elsewhere in Europe, had a common origin in the distant past.

== Historical customs ==
Beltane was one of four Gaelic seasonal festivals: Samhain (1 November), Imbolc (1 February), Beltane (1 May), and Lughnasadh (1 August). Beltane marked the beginning of the pastoral summer season, when livestock were driven out to the summer pastures. Rituals were held at that time to protect them from harm, both natural and supernatural, and this mainly involved the "symbolic use of fire". There were also rituals to protect crops, dairy products and people, and to encourage growth. The aos sí (often referred to as spirits or fairies) were thought to be especially active at Beltane (as at Samhain), and the goal of many Beltane rituals was to appease them. Most scholars see the aos sí as remnants of the pagan gods and nature spirits. Beltane was a "spring time festival of optimism" during which "fertility ritual again was important, perhaps connecting with the waxing power of the sun".

=== Ancient and medieval ===
The earliest mention of Beltane is in Old Irish literature from Gaelic Ireland. The early-10th century text Sanas Cormaic (Cormac's Glossary) has an entry for "Belltaine" and derives it from bil-tene, "lucky fire". It says that to protect cattle from disease, the druids used to light two fires "with great incantations" and drive the cattle between them. In another entry, for "Bel, Bil", Sanas Cormaic says that Belltaine means "fire of Bel", explaining that Bel or Bil was "an idol god" and that "a fire was kindled in his name at the beginning of summer always, and cattle were driven between the two fires". Some scholars suggest that this might have been the Celtic healing god Belenos, although there is no other mention of Bel in Old Irish writings. Other scholars suggest that the writer was attempting to link the druidic fires with the Biblical god Baal.

The medieval tale Tochmarc Emire (The Wooing of Emer) gives the same description of Beltaine, that "the druids used to make two fires with great incantations, and to drive the cattle between them against the plagues, every year". It says that it marks the beginning of summer, and calls Beltaine and Samhain (the beginning of winter) the two main divisions of the year. Glosses in the Senchas Már, a 7th–8th century collection of laws, say that it is customary to take the cattle out around May Day (im Beltaine) from the green of the old residence (senlis) to a summer pasture (áirge), and to return around November Day (im Samain).

According to 17th-century historian Geoffrey Keating, there was a great gathering at the hill of Uisneach each Beltane in medieval Ireland, where a sacrifice was made to a god named Beil. Keating wrote that two bonfires would be lit in every district of Ireland, and cattle would be driven between them to protect them from disease. There is no reference to such a gathering in the annals, but the medieval Dindsenchas (lore of places) includes a tale of a hero lighting a holy fire on Uisneach that blazed for seven years. Ronald Hutton writes that this may "preserve a tradition of Beltane ceremonies there", but adds "Keating or his source may simply have conflated this legend with the information in Sanas Chormaic to produce a piece of pseudo-history". Nevertheless, excavations at Uisneach in the 20th century found evidence of large fires and charred bones, and showed it to have been a place of ritual since ancient times. Evidence suggests it was "a sanctuary-site, in which fire was kept burning perpetually, or kindled at frequent intervals", where animal sacrifices were offered.

Beltane is also mentioned in medieval Scottish literature. An early reference is found in the poem 'Peblis to the Play', contained in the Maitland Manuscripts of 15th- and 16th-century Scots poetry, which describes the celebration in the town of Peebles.

=== Modern era ===
From the late 18th century to the mid 20th century, many accounts of Beltane customs were recorded by folklorists and other writers. For example John Jamieson, in his Etymological Dictionary of the Scottish Language (1808), describes some of the Beltane customs which persisted in the 18th and early 19th centuries in parts of Scotland, which he noted were beginning to die out.

==== Bonfires ====
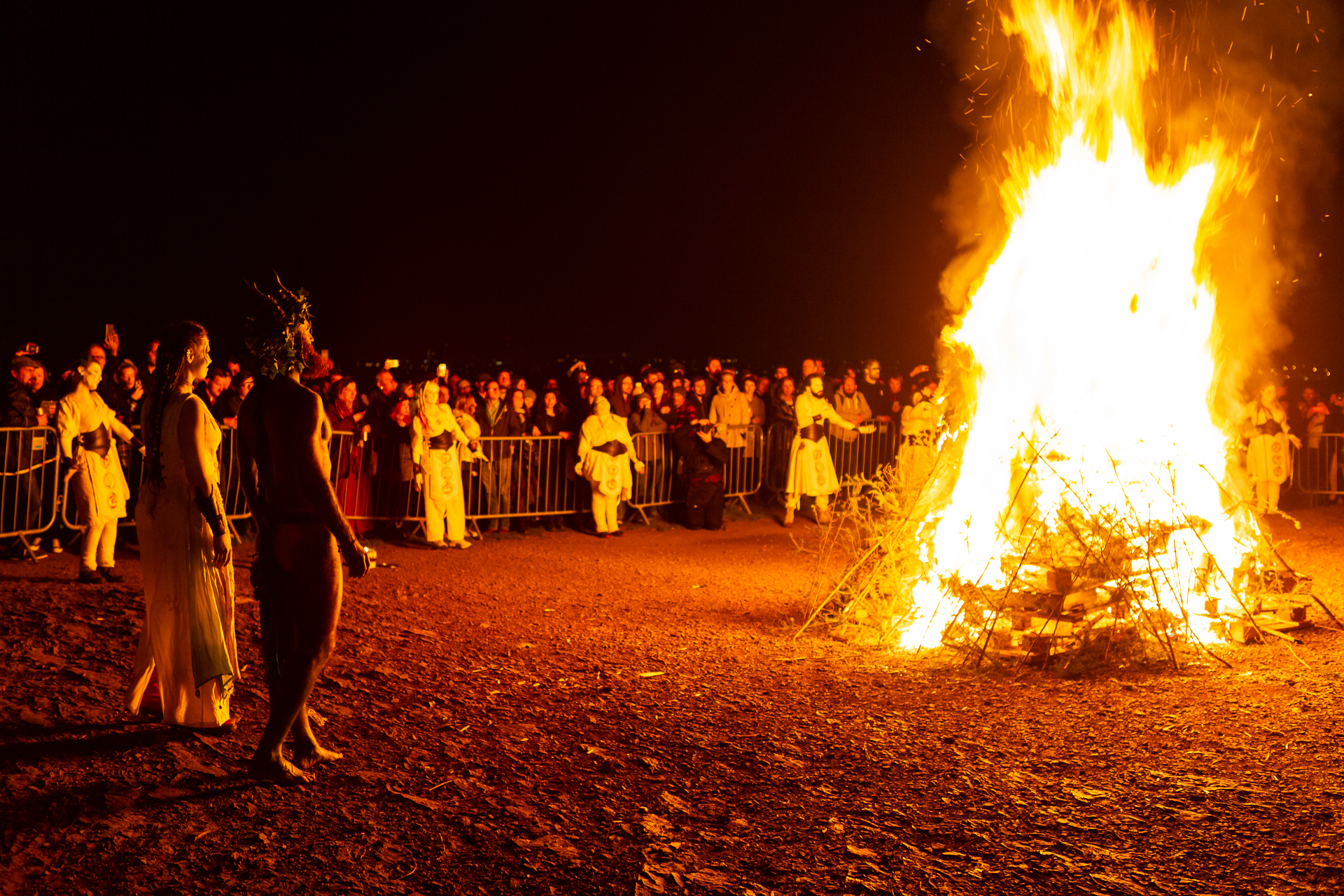
Beltane Fire Festival, Edinburgh, 2019

Bonfires continued to be a key part of the festival in the modern era. All hearth fires would be doused before the bonfire was lit, generally on a hill. Ronald Hutton writes that "To increase the potency of the holy flames, in Britain at least they were often kindled by the most primitive of all means, of friction between wood." This is known as a need-fire, or tein' èiginn in Gaelic. It was a sacred fire that could be kindled only with a wooden drill, by a group of certain people (usually nine men), after they had removed all metal and after all other fires in the area had been doused. Nineteenth-century writers record such fires being kindled at Beltane in the Scottish Highlands, and also in Wales. Its flames were believed to guard against sickness, supernatural harm and witchcraft.

In the 19th century, cattle were still driven over flames or between two fires—as described in Sanas Cormaic almost 1000 years before—in parts of Ireland and Scotland. Sometimes the cattle would be driven around a bonfire or be made to leap over flames or embers. The people themselves did likewise for good luck and protection. On the Isle of Man, people ensured that the smoke blew over them and their cattle.

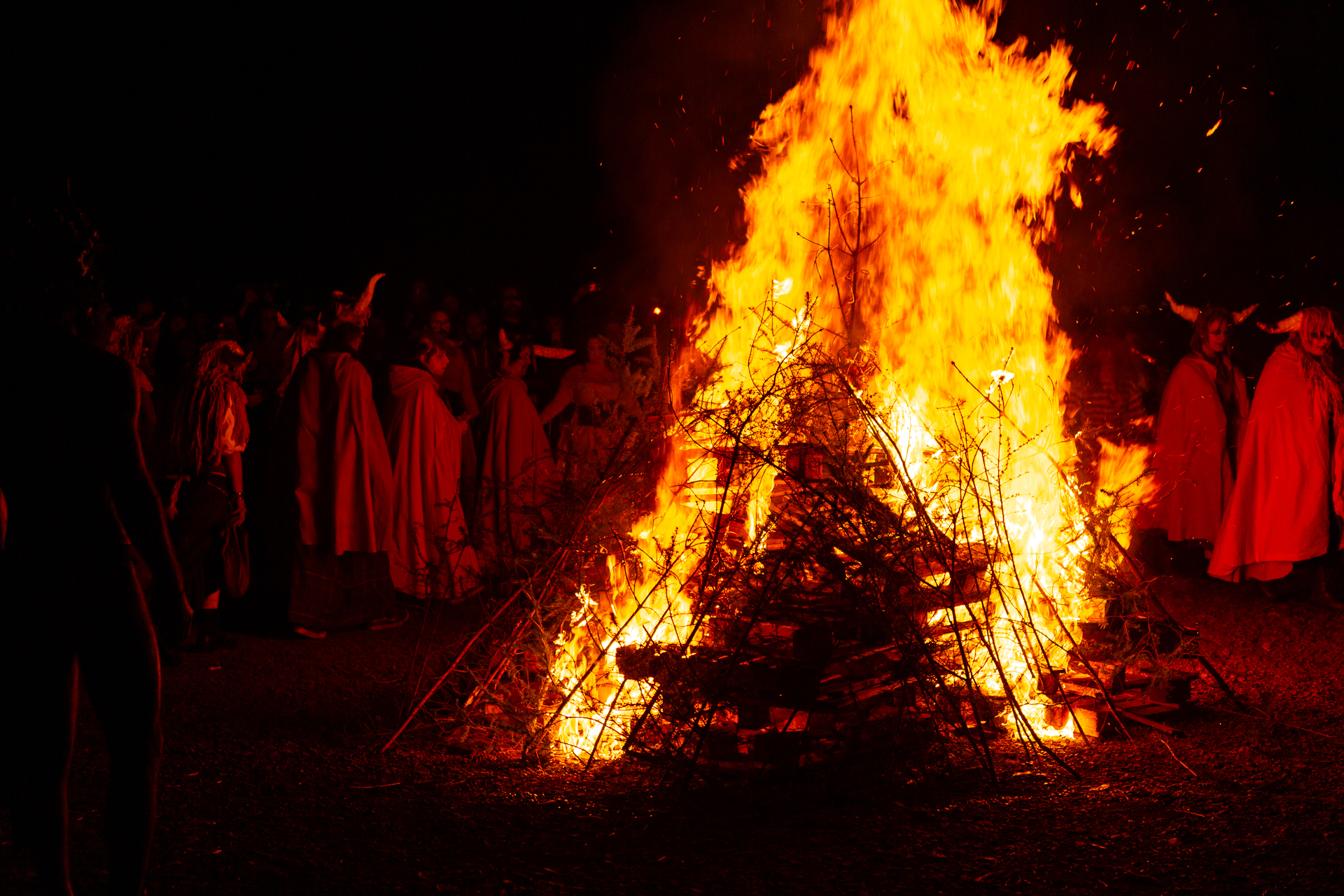
Beltane Fire Festival, Edinburgh, 2019 - participants dressed as cattle

When the bonfire died down, people would daub themselves with its ashes and sprinkle it over their crops and livestock. Burning torches from the bonfire would be taken home, carried around the house or boundary of the farmstead, and used to re-light the hearth. From these rituals, it is clear that the fire was seen as having protective powers. Similar rituals were part of May Day or Midsummer customs in some other parts of the British Isles and mainland Europe. Frazer believed the fire rituals are a kind of imitative or sympathetic magic. He suggests they were meant to mimic the Sun and "ensure a needful supply of sunshine for men, animals, and plants", as well as to symbolically "burn up and destroy all harmful influences".

Food was also cooked at the bonfire and there were rituals involving it. In the Scottish Highlands, Alexander Carmichael recorded that there was a feast featuring lamb, and that formerly this lamb was sacrificed. In 1769, Thomas Pennant wrote of Beltane bonfires in Perthshire, where a caudle made from eggs, butter, oatmeal and milk was cooked. Some of the mixture was poured on the ground as a libation. Everyone would then take an oatmeal cake, called a bannoch Bealltainn or "Beltane bannock", which had nine knobs on it. Each person would face the fire, break off a knob one-by-one and throw it over their shoulder, offering them to the spirits to protect their livestock (one to protect the horses, one to protect the sheep, and so forth) and to the predators that might harm their livestock (one to the fox, one to the eagle, and so forth). Afterwards, they would drink the caudle.

According to 18th-century writers John Ramsay of Ochtertyre and John Sinclair, in parts of Scotland there was another ritual involving the Beltane bannock. The cake would be cut and one of the slices marked with charcoal. The slices would then be put in a bonnet and everyone would take one out while blindfolded. According to Ramsay, whoever got the marked piece had to leap through the flames three times. Those present pretended to throw the person into the fire and, for some time afterwards, would refer to them as the 'carline' (the hag or witch). This "may embody a memory of actual human sacrifice", or it may have always been symbolic. There was an almost identical May Day (Calan Mai) tradition in parts of Wales, and mock-burnings were part of spring and summer bonfire festivals in other parts of Europe.

==== Flowers and May Bushes ====
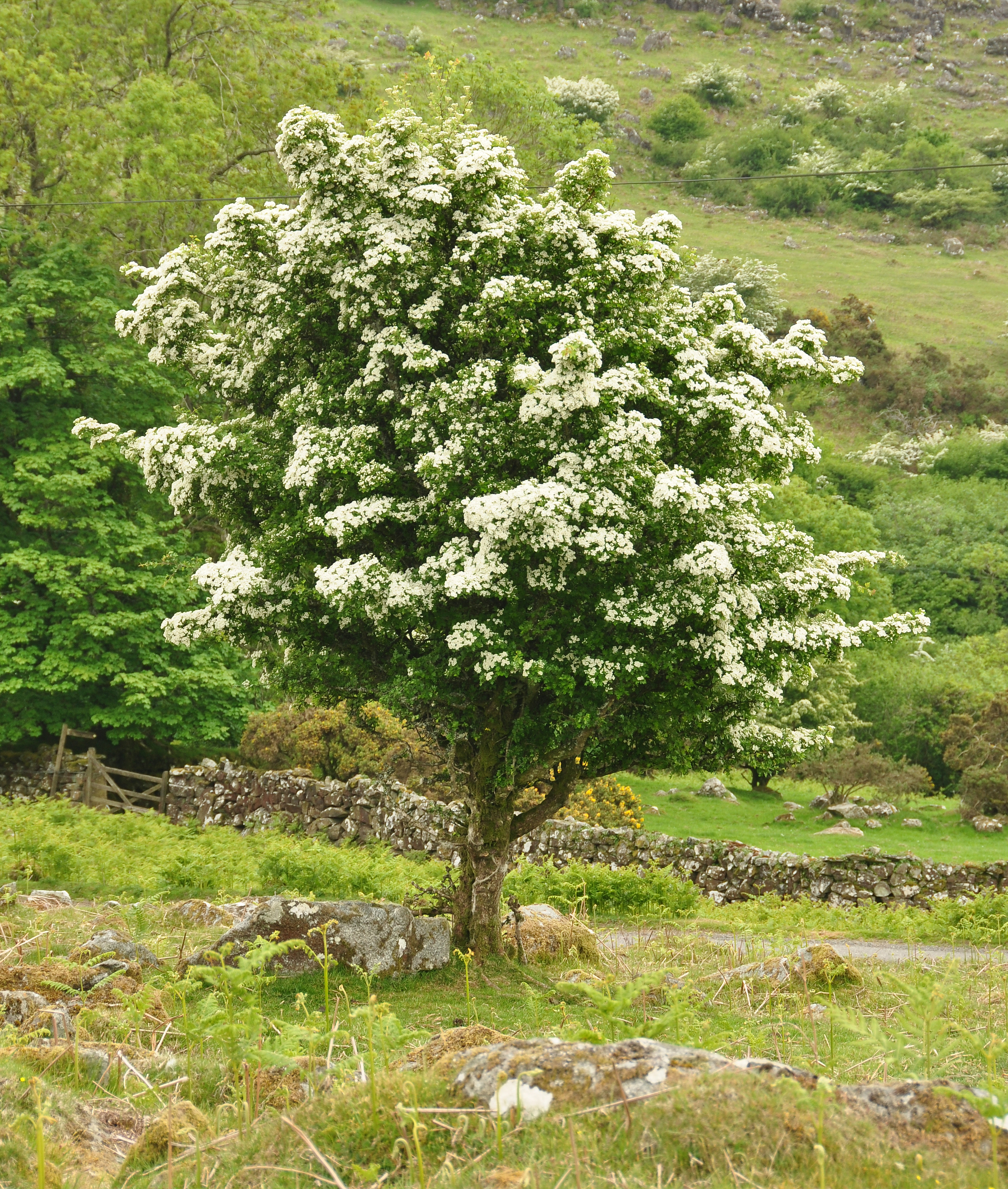
A flowering hawthorn

Yellow and white flowers such as primrose, rowan, hawthorn, gorse, hazel, and marsh marigold were traditionally placed at doorways and windows; this is documented in 19th century Ireland, Scotland and Mann. Sometimes loose flowers were strewn at doors and windows and sometimes they were made into bouquets, garlands or crosses and fastened to them. Cows would also be decorated with them, and they would be fastened to equipment for milking and butter making. It is likely that such flowers were used because they evoked fire. Similar May Day customs are found across Europe.

The May Bush or May Bough was popular in parts of Ireland until the late 19th century. This was a small tree or branch—typically hawthorn, rowan, holly or sycamore—decorated with bright flowers, ribbons, painted shells or eggshells from Easter Sunday, and so forth. The tree would either be decorated where it stood, or branches would be decorated and placed inside or outside the house (particularly above windows and doors, on the roof, and on barns). It was generally the responsibility of the oldest person of the house to decorate the May Bush, and the tree would remain up until 31 May. The tree would also be decorated with candles or rushlights. Sometimes a May Bush would be paraded through the town. In parts of southern Ireland, gold and silver hurling balls known as May Balls would be hung on these May Bushes and handed out to children or given to the winners of a hurling match. In Dublin and Belfast, May Bushes were brought into town from the countryside and decorated by the whole neighbourhood. Each neighbourhood vied for the most handsome tree and, sometimes, residents of one would try to steal the May Bush of another. This led to the May Bush being outlawed in Victorian times. In some places, it was customary to sing and dance around the May Bush, and at the end of the festivities it may be burnt in the bonfire. In some areas the May Bush or Bough has also been called the "May Pole", but it is the bush or tree described above, and not the more commonly-known European maypole.

Thorn trees are traditionally seen as special trees, associated with the aos sí. Frazer believed the customs of decorating trees or poles in springtime are a relic of tree worship and wrote: "The intention of these customs is to bring home to the village, and to each house, the blessings which the tree-spirit has in its power to bestow." Emyr Estyn Evans suggests that the May Bush custom may have come to Ireland from England, because it seemed to be found in areas with strong English influence and because the Irish saw it as unlucky to damage certain thorn trees. However, "lucky" and "unlucky" trees varied by region, and it has been suggested that Beltane was the only time when cutting thorn trees was allowed. The practice of bedecking a May Bush with flowers, ribbons, garlands and bright shells is found among the Gaelic diaspora, most notably in Newfoundland, and in some Easter traditions on the East Coast of the United States.

==== Warding-off harmful spirits ====
Many Beltane practices were designed to ward off harmful spirits or appease the aos sí (often referred to as the fairies) and prevent them from stealing dairy products, which were thought to be especially at risk. For example, May flowers were tied to milk pails or the tails of cattle to ensure the cattle's milk was not stolen, or three black coals might be placed under a butter churn to ensure the fairies did not steal the butter.

On the Isle of Man, small crosses made of rowan were worn, fastened over doorways, and tied to cattle, as protection against witchcraft and evil spirits. It was called a crosh cuirn.

Food was left or milk poured at the doorstep or places associated with the aos sí, such as 'fairy trees', as an offering. However, milk was never given to a neighbour on May Day because it was feared that the milk would be transferred to the neighbour's cow.

In Ireland, cattle would be brought to 'fairy forts', where a small amount of their blood would be collected. The owners would then pour it into the earth with prayers for the herd's safety. Sometimes the blood would be left to dry and then be burnt.

To protect farm produce and encourage fertility, farmers would lead a procession around the boundaries of their farm. They would "carry with them seeds of grain, implements of husbandry, the first well water, and the herb vervain (or rowan as a substitute). The procession generally stopped at the four cardinal points of the compass, beginning in the east, and rituals were performed in each of the four directions". People made the sign of the cross with milk for good luck on Beltane, and the sign of the cross was also made on the backsides of cattle.

==== Beltane blessings ====
In the 19th century, folklorist Alexander Carmichael (1832–1912), collected the Scottish Gaelic song Am Beannachadh Bealltain ("The Beltane Blessing") in his Carmina Gadelica, which he heard from a crofter in South Uist. The first two verses were sung as follows:

Beannaich, a Thrianailt fhioir nach gann, (Bless, O Threefold true and bountiful,)
Mi fein, mo cheile agus mo chlann, (Myself, my spouse and my children,)
Mo chlann mhaoth's am mathair chaomh 'n an ceann, (My tender children and their beloved mother at their head,)
Air chlar chubhr nan raon, air airidh chaon nam beann, (On the fragrant plain, at the gay mountain shieling,)
Air chlar chubhr nan raon, air airidh chaon nam beann. (On the fragrant plain, at the gay mountain shieling.)

Gach ni na m' fhardaich, no ta 'na m' shealbh, (Everything within my dwelling or in my possession,)
Gach buar is barr, gach tan is tealbh, (All kine and crops, all flocks and corn,)
Bho Oidhche Shamhna chon Oidhche Bheallt, (From Hallow Eve to Beltane Eve,)
Piseach maith, agus beannachd mallt, (With goodly progress and gentle blessing,)
Bho mhuir, gu muir, agus bun gach allt, (From sea to sea, and every river mouth,)
Bho thonn gu tonn, agus bonn gach steallt. (From wave to wave, and base of waterfall.)

==== Other customs ====
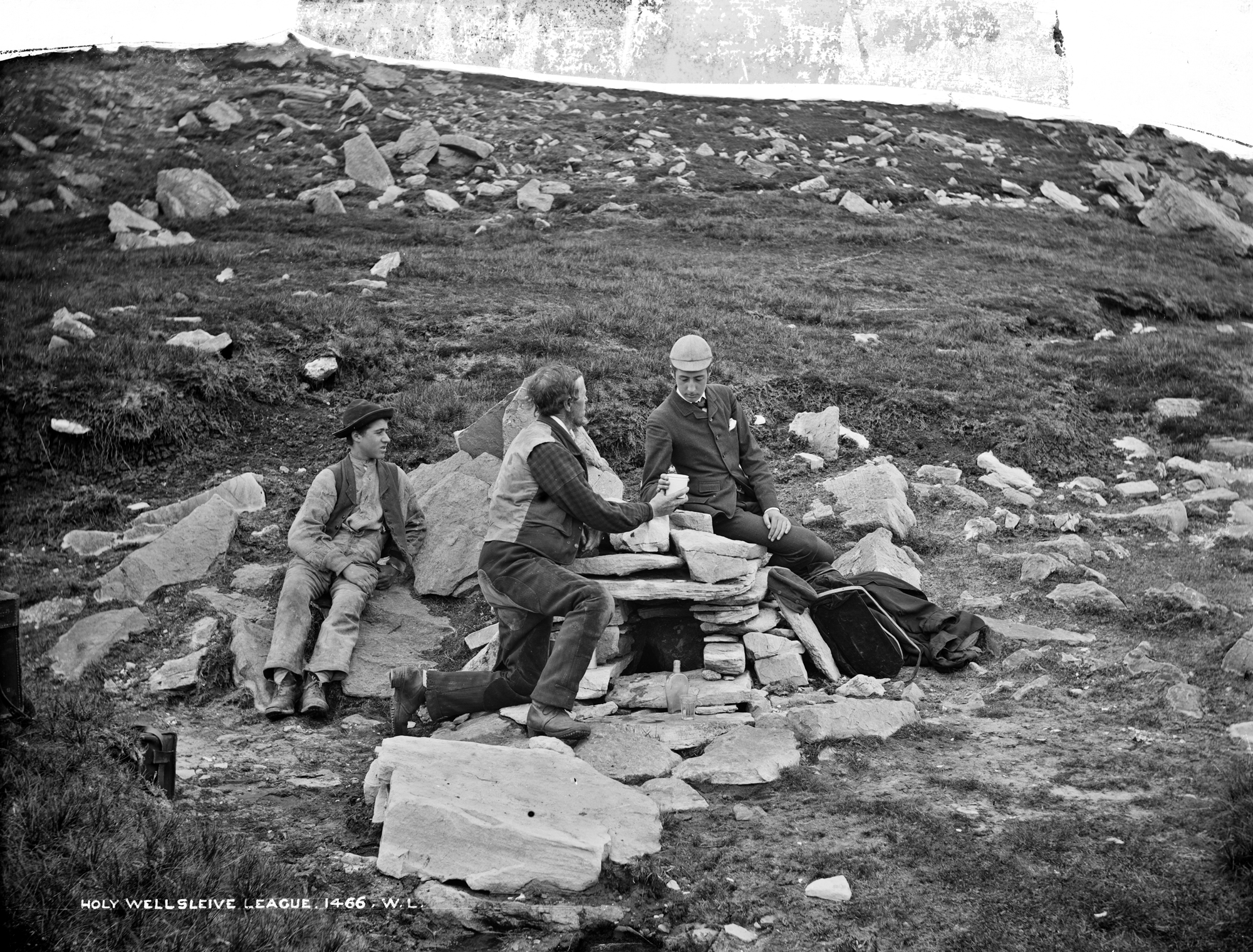
Men visiting a holy well in County Donegal in the 1890s

Holy wells were often visited at Beltane, and at the other Gaelic festivals of Imbolc and Lughnasadh. Visitors to holy wells would pray for health while walking sunwise (moving from east to west) around the well. They would then leave offerings; typically coins or clooties (see clootie well). The first water drawn from a well on Beltane was thought to be especially potent, and would bring good luck to the person who drew it. Beltane morning dew was also thought to bring good luck and health. At dawn or before sunrise on Beltane, maidens would roll in the dew or wash their faces with it. The dew was collected in a jar, left in sunlight, then filtered. The dew was thought to increase sexual attractiveness, maintain youthfulness, protect from sun damage (particularly freckles and sunburn) and help with skin ailments for the ensuing year. It was also thought that a man who washed his face with soap and water on Beltane will grow long whiskers on his face.

It was widely believed that no one should light a fire on May Day morning until they saw smoke rising from a neighbour's house. It was also believed to be bad luck to put out ashes or clothes on May Day, and to give away coal or ashes would cause the giver difficulty in lighting fires for the next year. Also, if the family owned a white horse, it should remain in the barn all day, and if any other horse was owned, a red rag should be tied to its tail. Any foal born on May Day was fated to kill a man, and any cow that calved on May Day would die. Any birth or marriage on May Day was generally believed to be ill-fated. On May Night a cake and a jug were left on the table, because it was believed that the Irish who had died abroad would return on May Day to their ancestral homes, and it was also believed that the dead returned on May Day to visit their friends. A robin that flew into the house on Beltane was believed to portend the death of a household member.

The festival persisted widely up until the 1950s, and in some places the celebration of Beltane continues today.

== Revival ==
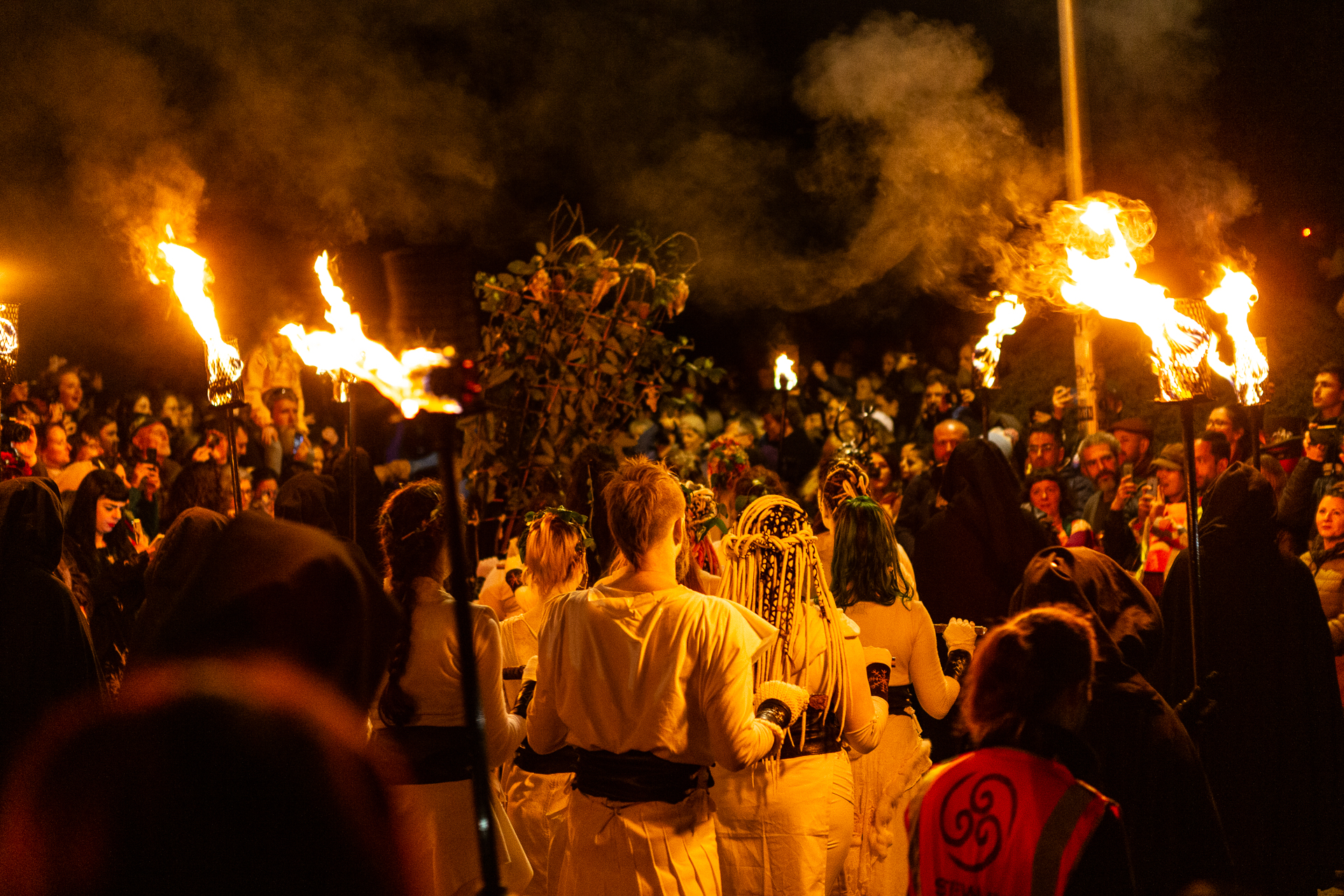
Beltane Fire Festival, Edinburgh, 2019

As a festival, Beltane had largely died out by the mid-20th century, although some of its customs continued and in some places it has been revived as a cultural event. In Ireland, Beltane fires were common until the mid-20th century, and has been revived as an annual festival in County Westmeath on the Hill of Uisneach since 2009. It culminates in a torchlit procession by participants in costume, some on horseback, and the lighting of a large bonfire at dusk. In 2017, the ceremonial fire was lit by the President of Ireland, Michael D. Higgins.

The lighting of a community Beltane fire from which each hearth fire is then relit is observed today in some parts of the Gaelic diaspora, though in most of these cases it is a cultural revival rather than an unbroken survival of the ancient tradition. In parts of Newfoundland, the custom of decorating the May Bush also survives. The town of Peebles in the Scottish Borders holds a traditional week-long Beltane Fair every year in June, when a local girl is crowned Beltane Queen on the steps of the parish church. Like other Borders festivals, it incorporates a Common Riding.

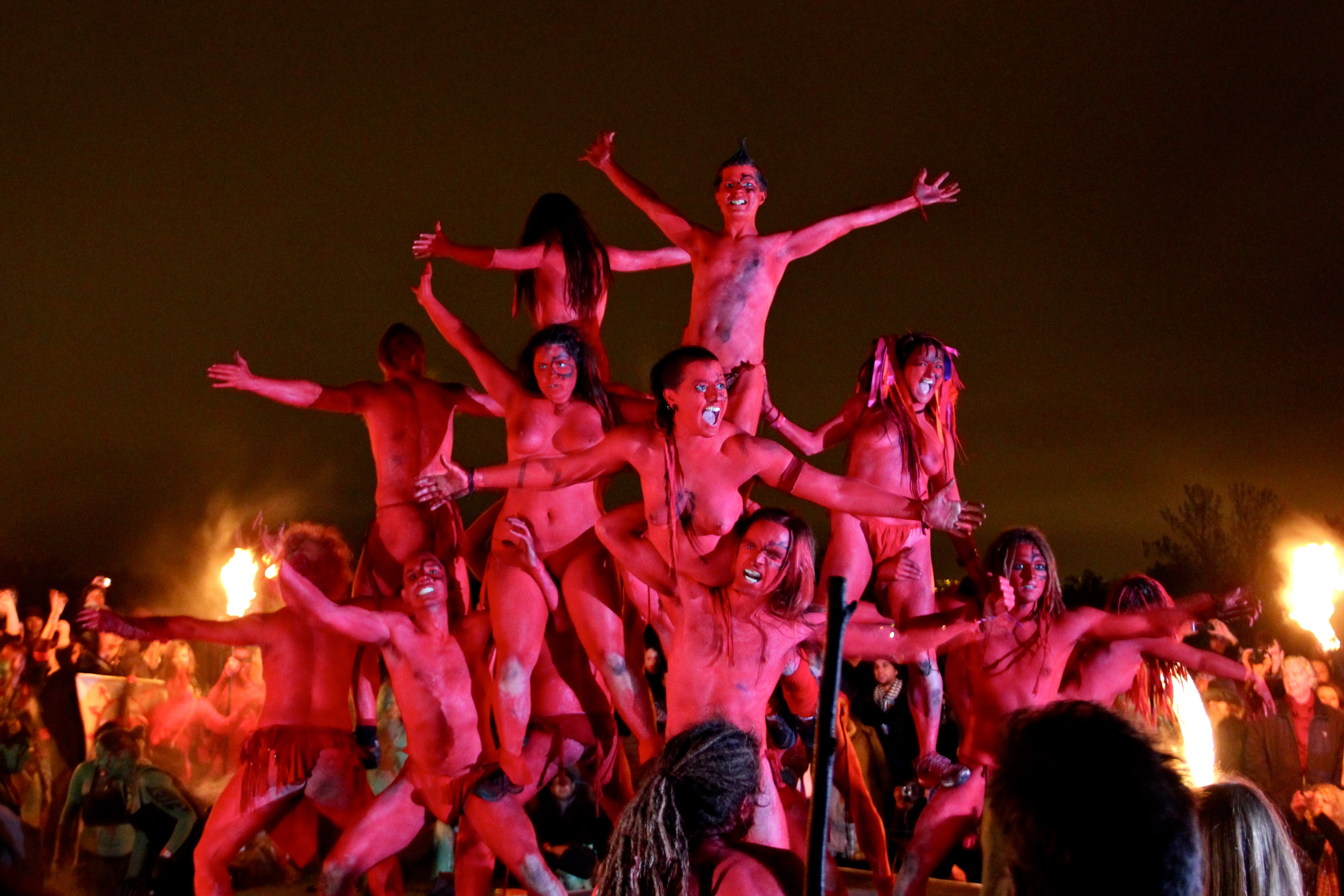
Beltane Fire Festival dancers, 2012

Since 1988, a Beltane Fire Festival has been held every year on the night of 30 April on Calton Hill in Edinburgh, Scotland. While inspired by traditional Beltane, it is a modern celebration of summer's beginning which draws on many influences. The performance art event involves fire dances and a procession by costumed performers, led by the May Queen and the Green Man, culminating in the lighting of a bonfire.

Butser Ancient Farm, an open-air archaeology museum in Hampshire, England, has also held a Beltane festival since the 1980s. The festival mixes historical reenactment with folk influences, and features a May Queen and Green Man, living history displays, reenactor battles, demonstrations of traditional crafts, performances of folk music, and Celtic storytelling. The festival ends with the burning of a 30–40 ft wickerman, with a new historical or folk-inspired design each year. Butser Ancient Farm acknowledges that their Beltane celebrations are not an attempt to reconstruct authentic historical pagan practices.

The 1970 recording 'Ride a White Swan', written and performed by Marc Bolan and his band T.Rex, contains the line "Ride a white Swan like the people of the Beltane".

=== Neopaganism ===
Beltane and Beltane-based festivals are held by some Neopagans. As there are many kinds of Neopaganism, their Beltane celebrations can be very different despite the shared name. Some try to emulate the historic festival as much as possible. Other Neopagans base their celebrations on many sources, the Gaelic festival being only one of them.

Neopagans usually celebrate Beltane on 30 April – 1 May in the Northern Hemisphere and 31 October – 1 November in the Southern Hemisphere, beginning and ending at sunset. Some Neopagans celebrate it at the astronomical midpoint between the spring equinox and summer solstice (or the full moon nearest this point). In the Northern Hemisphere, this midpoint is when the ecliptic longitude of the Sun reaches 45 degrees.

==== Celtic Reconstructionist ====
Celtic Reconstructionists strive to reconstruct ancient Celtic religion. Their religious practices are based on research and historical accounts, but modified to suit modern life. They avoid syncretism and eclecticism (i.e. combining practises from unrelated cultures).

Celtic Reconstructionists usually celebrate Beltane when the local hawthorn trees are in bloom. Many observe the traditional bonfire rites, to whatever extent this is feasible where they live. This may involve passing themselves and their pets or livestock between two bonfires, and bringing home a candle lit from the bonfire. If they are unable to make a bonfire or attend a bonfire ceremony, candles may be used instead. They may decorate their homes with a May Bush, branches from blooming thorn trees, or equal-armed rowan crosses. Holy wells may be visited and offerings made to the spirits or deities of the wells. Traditional festival foods may also be prepared.

==== Wicca ====
Wiccans use the name Beltane or Beltain for their May Day celebrations. It is one of the yearly Sabbats of their Wheel of the Year, following Ostara and preceding Midsummer. Unlike Celtic Reconstructionism, Wicca is syncretic and melds practices from many different cultures. In general, the Wiccan Beltane is more akin to the Germanic/English May Day festival, both in its significance (focusing on fertility) and its rituals (such as maypole dancing). Some Wiccans enact a ritual union of the May Lord and May Lady.

== See also ==
- Walpurgis Night
- Parilia
- Lìxià (立夏)
