= Fairy path =

In folklore, a route taken by fairies

According to folklore a fairy path (or 'passage', 'avenue', or 'pass') is a route taken by fairies usually in a straight line and between sites of traditional significance, such as fairy forts or raths (a class of circular earthwork dating from the Iron Age), "airy" (eerie) mountains and hills, thorn bushes, springs, lakes, rock outcrops, and Stone Age monuments. Ley lines and spirit paths, such as with corpse roads, have some similarities with these fairy paths. A fairy ring is also a path used by fairies, but in a circle, for dancing, as described by poet W. B. Yeats, "...the fairies dance in a place apart, Shaking their milk-white feet in a ring,..." The concept is usually associated with Celtic folklore, especially that of Ireland.

== Fairy paths and dwellings ==
In some parts of Ireland, Brittany and Germany there were fairy or spirit paths that while being invisible nevertheless had such perceived geographical reality in the minds of the country people that building practices were adapted to ensure they were not obstructed. A significant number of the characteristics of fairy paths are shared in common with ley lines. In many parts of Northern Europe the round barrows were the traditional homes of the fairies, elves, or trolls and were avoided by the country folk. Such places were Fairy Toot in Somerset, Elf Howe barrow near Folkton, Yorkshire, and a round barrow at Beedon in Berkshire. Cornwall was and is a stronghold of fairy lore: fairies are said to dance on Carn Gluze, near St Just in Penwith. In Danish Jutland there was a belief that "Barrow-folk" dwelt in barrows and were descendants of fallen angels cast out of Heaven. Likewise, it was considered bad luck to let cattle graze on any place where the Elf-folk have been, or to let the cattle mingle with the large blue cattle of the elves. However, all evils may be averted if one were to ask at an "Elf-barrow" for permission to graze cattle on their mound. Some Danish "Elf-barrows" included one near Galtebjerg, another not far from Kalundborg; one between Thisted and Aalborg that was said to be the home of an elfin smith; two near Sundby where a troll-smith would ride from one to the other followed by his apprentices and journeymen; and one at Tröstrup where according to legend a giant was buried, and it was said his daughter wandered across the fields and one day met a ploughman whom she took back to her father who then set the man free, fearing that they'd be driven out of their barrow. In Sweden similar beliefs existed and one barrow called Helvetesbacke ("Hell's mouth") that lies near Kråktorps gård, Småland, was claimed to be the burial mound of Odin. In Germany the Wild Troop of Rodenstein was said to ride a straight path between the castles of Rodenstein and Schnellert. Also throughout Europe are Corpse roads, which are generally believed to be of the same basic belief as fairy paths and most likely share an origin. In Germany and the Netherlands in particular, these tend to be straight invisible lines and are known by a variety of names including Geisterweg ("ghost-way" or "ghost-road") and Helweg ("hell-way" or "hell-road") in German and Doodweg ("death-way" or "death-road") in Dutch. A similarly straight road did however run straight over various burial mounds at Rösaring, Lassa in southern Sweden.

== Consequences of blocking fairy paths ==
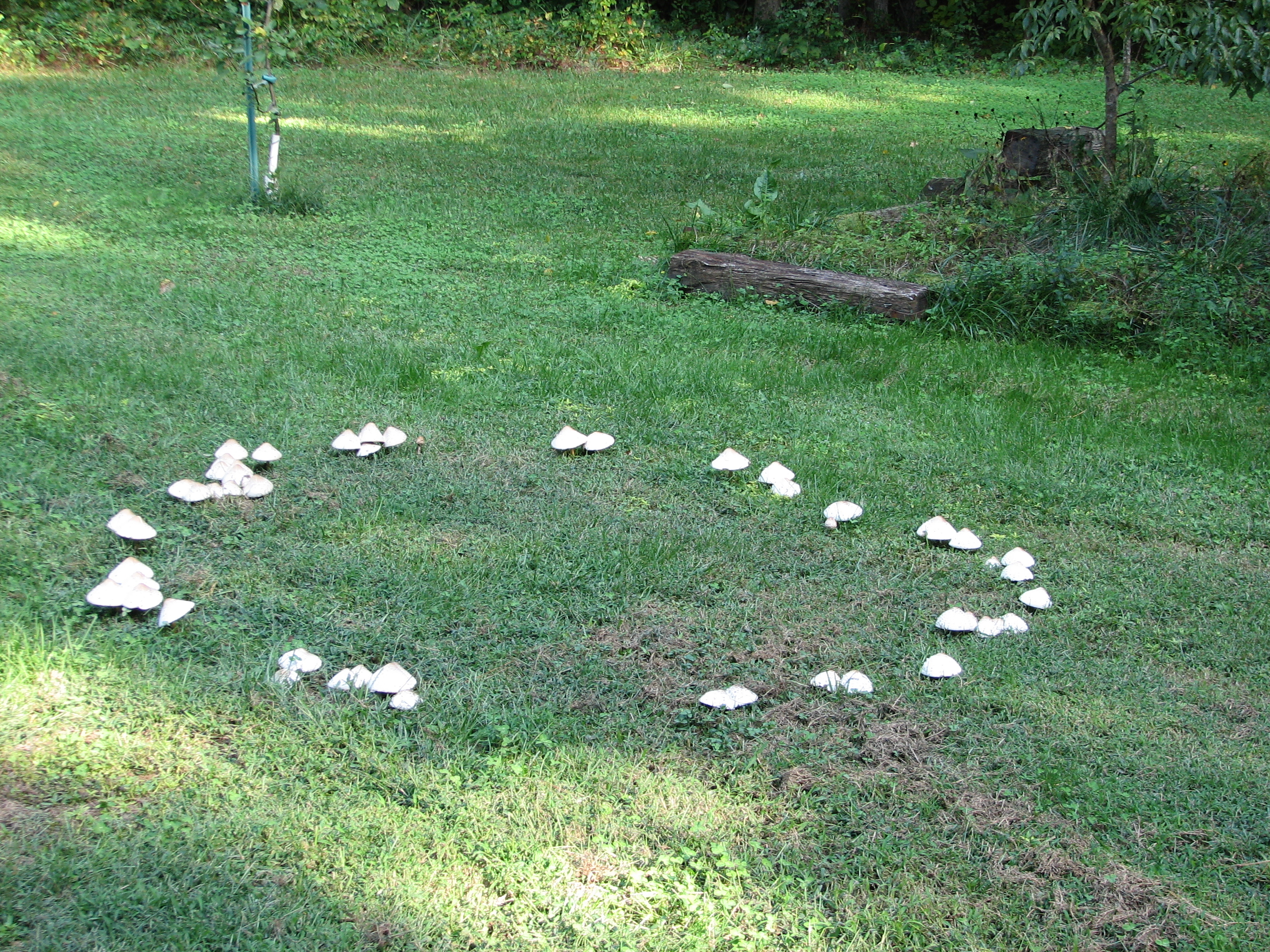
A fairy ring of mushrooms

In Ireland, people who had illnesses or other misfortune, were said to live in houses that were "in the way" or in a "contrary place", obstructing a fairy path. An example is that of a family in which four children sickened and died, leaving the doctors baffled. The fifth child sickened and was near death, only to make a sudden and full recovery. The father told the doctor that he had consulted a wise woman who informed him that his new house extension blocked a fairy path between two fairy forts, whereupon he demolished it and his child became healthy again.

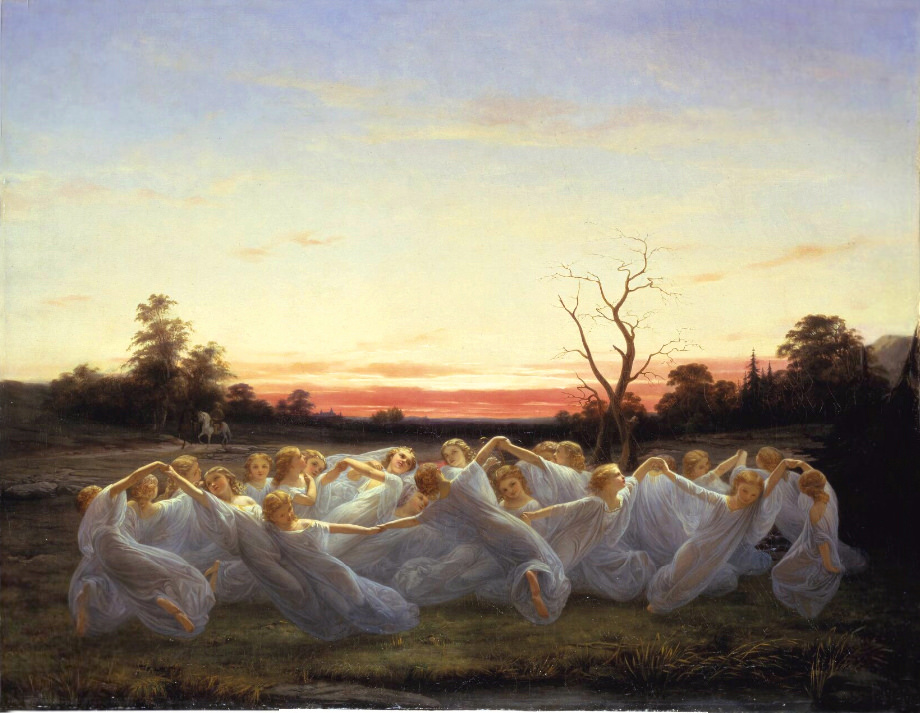
Fairies of the meadow, by Nils Blommér

An example of this fairy path straightness is provided by an account concerning a croft (now a cattle shed) at Knockeencreen, Brosna, County Kerry. In an interview in the 1980s, the last human occupant told of the troubles his grandfather had experienced there, with his cattle periodically and inexplicably dying. The front door is exactly opposite the back door. The grandfather was informed by a passing Gypsy that the dwelling stands on a fairy path running between two hills. The Gypsy advised the grandfather to keep the doors slightly ajar at night to allow the fairies free passage. The advice was heeded and the problem ceased. It so happens that the building is indeed on a straight line drawn between two local hilltops, and is, moreover, at one end of a long, straight track.

The fairies processed from Rath Ringlestown in Ireland every night and parents brought their children in before the fairies were due to pass. The path passed round several bushes which were left undisturbed by the locals. A man who cut down one bush could not get it to burn and sickened and died within a short while as a supposed consequence of his actions. The route also passed between two mud-wall houses and a man who was out at the wrong time was found dead; the fairies having taken him for getting in the way of the procession. A traditional folk tale from the Southern Shore of Newfoundland, Canada, concerns a young married couple who discovered that they had built their house on a path used by the good people, and the steps that couple take to rid themselves of fairy mischief. It seems therefore that the fairy folk had emigrated together with their human counterparts or had been in Canada from time immemorial.

Home-owners have knocked corners from houses because the corner blocked the fairy path, and cottages have been built with the front and back doors in line, so that the owners could, in need, leave them both open and let the fairies troop through all night.

It was believed that a house built on a fairy path would suffer from midnight noises or supernatural manifestations. Ill-luck in the form of sick farm animals or personal illness could be the result and one remedy was to build small fires in several places along the fairy path, using fire from the blessed fire of Saint John's Eve that was lit every year at sunset on 23 June.

== Detecting fairy paths and overcoming their influence ==
Some builders used to use a technique to see if the planned construction was going to be on a fairy path; they would map out the floor plan in the earth and place a pile of stones at each corner and leave it overnight, if the stones were undisturbed it was safe to build, otherwise the work would not continue. There is another theme that states if one's house is on a fairy path, one must leave the doors and windows open at night, front and back, to allow fairies to pass through. Builders were also advised against using white quartz in their stonework, as it is said to be a fairy stone.

Wise-women were thought to be able to advise home builders of the existence of fairy paths, however in most folk-tales they are only consulted after the event and as a result of disturbances, bad luck, etc.

A building placed on a fairy path would be demolished by the fairy folk, at least twice, often remaining standing however on the third attempt.

== Walking along fairy paths ==
Paths that the fairies travel along are usually stated as being best avoided, however they also had certain benefits to humans, such as with 'trods' in the West of England. These are a straight-line fairy path in the grass of a field with a different shade of green to the rest. People with rheumatism sought relief by walking along these tracks, though animals avoid them. Great danger was still very much associated with using these paths at times when a supernatural procession might be using them. Fairy rings have certain elements in common with this phenomenon and were seen as 'gateways' into the realm of supernatural beings.

The Tylwyth teg of Wales have paths on which it is death for a mortal to walk.

The Breton Ankou, who is king of the dead, and his subjects have their own particular paths along which they process.

== Underwater fairy paths ==
Irish fairy paths are said to also exist under water, reminiscent of causeways in marshes at sacred sites and those to crannogs and other islands. These paths, only used by the fairy folk, ran from one island to another and were paved with coral, making them and their travellers visible to fishermen in their boats above.

== See also ==
- Fairy
- Fairy fort
- Fairy ring
- Folklore
- Ley line
