= Trod =

Path or line in English folklore

A Trod in the west of England is a straight line or fairy path in the grass of a field with a different shade of green from the rest. Great danger was associated with using these paths when a supernatural procession was using them. Fairy rings have certain elements in common with this phenomenon. People with rheumatism sought relief by walking along these paths; however animals were thought to actively avoid them.
