= Brigit's Garden =

- Gairdín Bhríde

- Location within Ireland
- Established: 2011
- Location: Pollagh, Rosscahill, County Galway, Ireland
- Coordinates: 53.38535°N 9.21246°W
- Type: open-air museum
- Public transit access: none
- Parking: On-site
- Website: www.brigitsgarden.ie

Brigit's Garden is a garden in County Galway, Ireland, located to the west of Lough Corrib. It is open to the public and is dedicated to the goddess Brigid and the Celtic calendar.

The founders describe it as "place of connection with nature, beauty and Celtic heritage".
