= Beltany stone circle =

Bronze Age stone circle

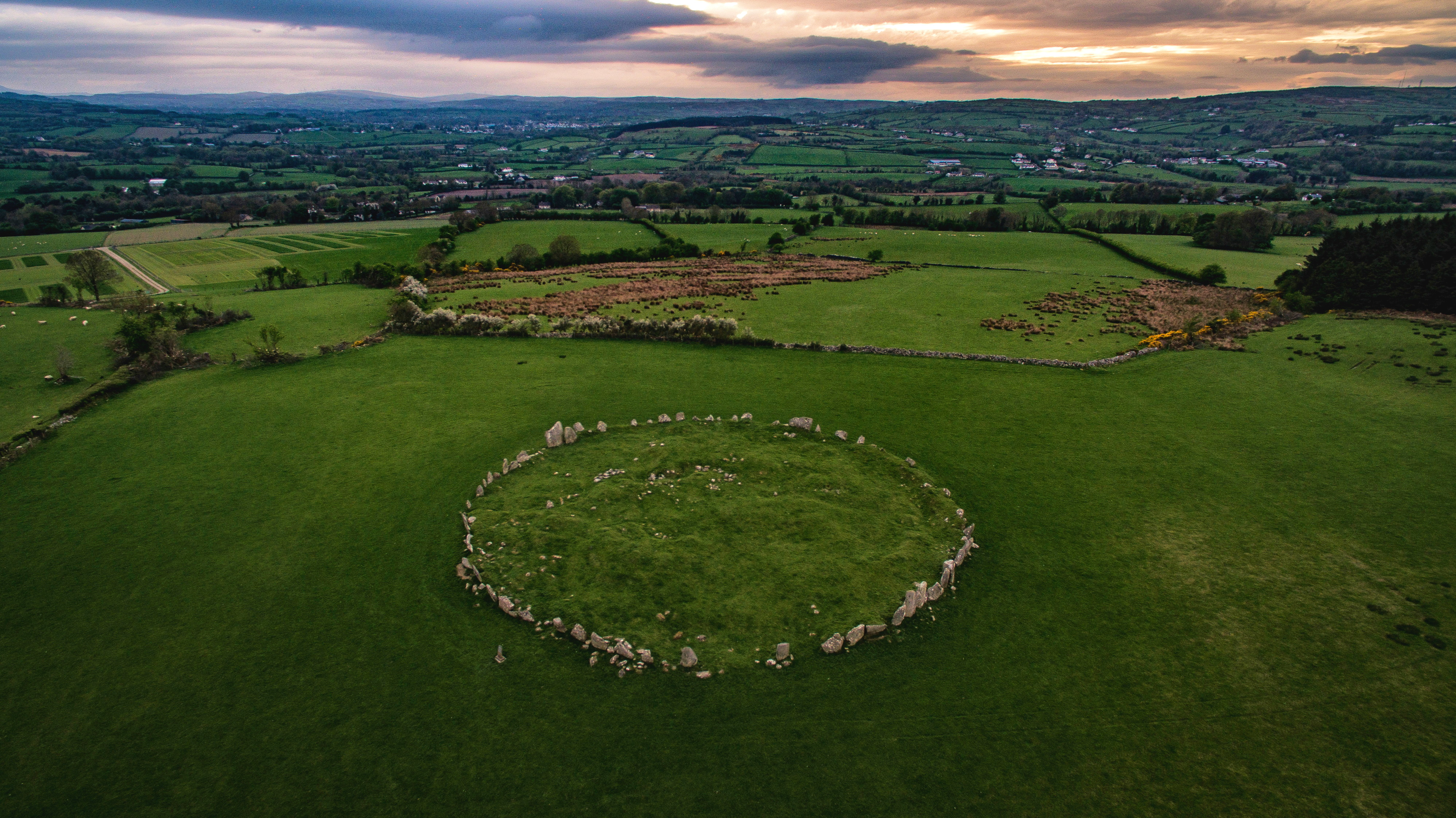
- The stone circle in 2018
- 54°51.025′N 7°36.28′W
- Type: Stone circle
- Location: Donegal, Ireland

History
- Built: c. 1400 BC

Site notes
- Material: Stone

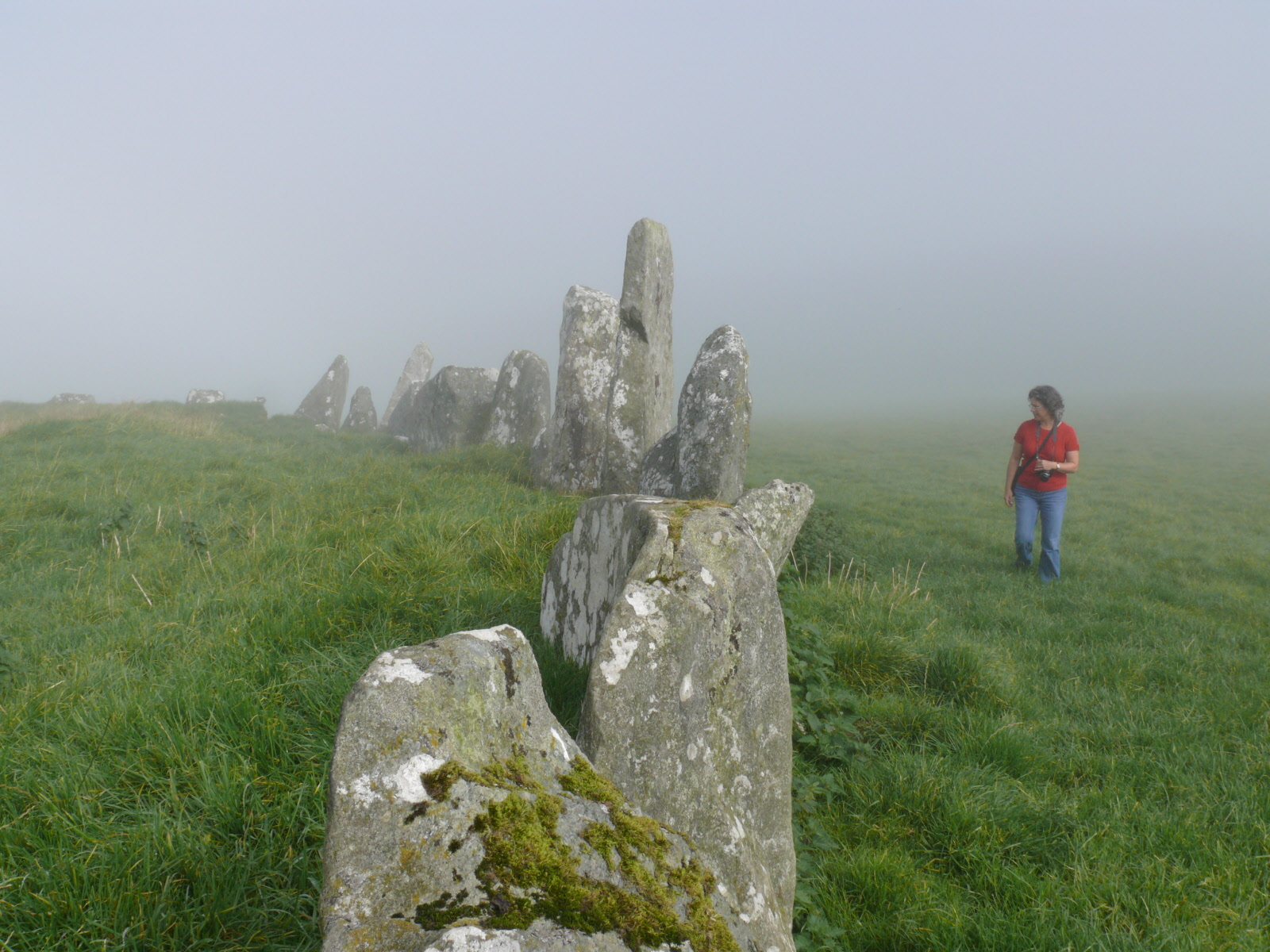
Beltany Stone Circle

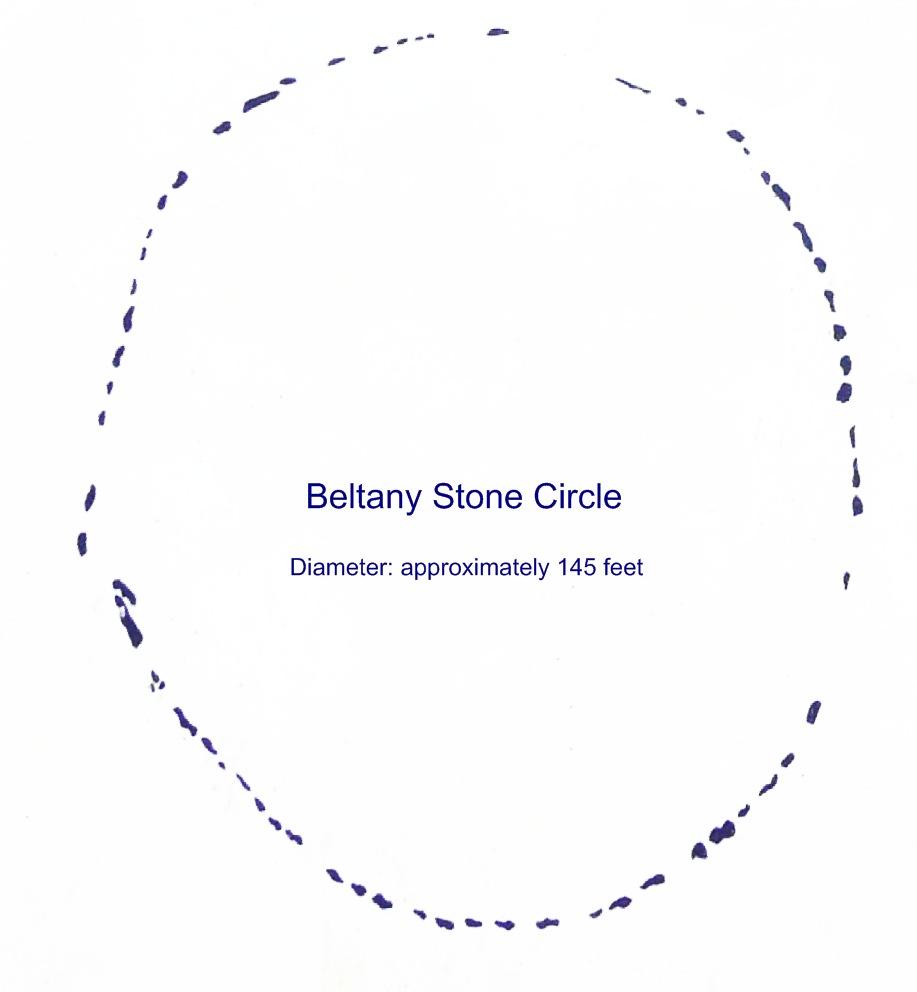
Layout

The Beltany stone circle is a Bronze Age stone circle just south of Raphoe town in County Donegal, Ireland. It dates from around 2100-700 BC. There is evidence that it may also have been the sacred site of Neolithic monuments, possibly early passage tombs. It overlooks the now destroyed passage tomb complex at Kilmonaster and Beltany is dominated by Croghan Hill to the east on the summit of which there sits a Neolithic mound most likely a passage tomb (though never excavated).

Beltany is 145 feet across and has 64 stones (originally there would have been at least 80 stones) of varying height and width enclosing an earthen platform. The stones are large with some more than 6 feet in height. The centre is greatly disturbed and most likely was the result of digging by locals in the 1700s for available loose stones to build farmsteads and field boundaries. This evidence was given orally to the Ordnance Survey field officers in 1830s which is written into the OS records. It states that locals recalled the removal of vast heaps of stone and sepulchral type graves with bones. The boulder wall close to the circle may support this evidence and the mention in OS early maps of ‘Tops Village’ at the foot of the hill. The enigmatic Stone Circle is situated on the summit of Tops Hill, the anglicized Gaelic word meaning ‘the lighting of a ceremonial torch’. Several stones are cupmarked. One in particular, the triangle stone on NE is decorated with circular incisions or cup marks visible to naked eye. Other stones have what appears to be replicated star constellations. The heavy stones on NW lean outwards possibly from pressure of the earlier debris and boulders removed in 1700s or due to depletion of earthen bank.

This was a ritual site associated with marking the agricultural Celtic year – the summer and winter Solstices and Equinox. The Celtic Ritual Year was in 4 parts – Beltaine (May), Samhain (November) the main parts and Imbolg (February) and Lughnasa (August). Beltany may be linked to marking both sunrise and sunset at these important ritual and ceremonial events in the year. It may also have a lunar orientation, yet to be calculated.

A single ‘outlier’ stone about 2 metres high stands to the southeast of the circle. It probably had some function related to the rituals or ceremonies in the circle. Or it may be one of the several line standing stones found in fields around the slopes of Tops hill and valley.

A carved stone head (flat to back) is believed to have come from lands around Beltany and thought to have functioned as either a mask or a mould from which ceremonial masks were fashioned in bronze or even gold. It is in the vaults at the National Museum in Dublin. These megaliths indicate that this landscape was marked out and used as a sacred and ritual site for several millennia.

It has been suggested that the name of the site is linked to the Celtic festival of fertility known as 'Beltane', the anglicised name for the Gaelic May Day festival, commonly held on 1 May and historically, widely observed throughout Ireland, Scotland and the Isle of Man. In Irish the name for the festival day is Lá Bealtaine, in Scottish Gaelic Là Bealltainn and in Manx Gaelic Laa Boaltinn/Boaldyn.
