= Calan Mai =

Traditional Welsh festival

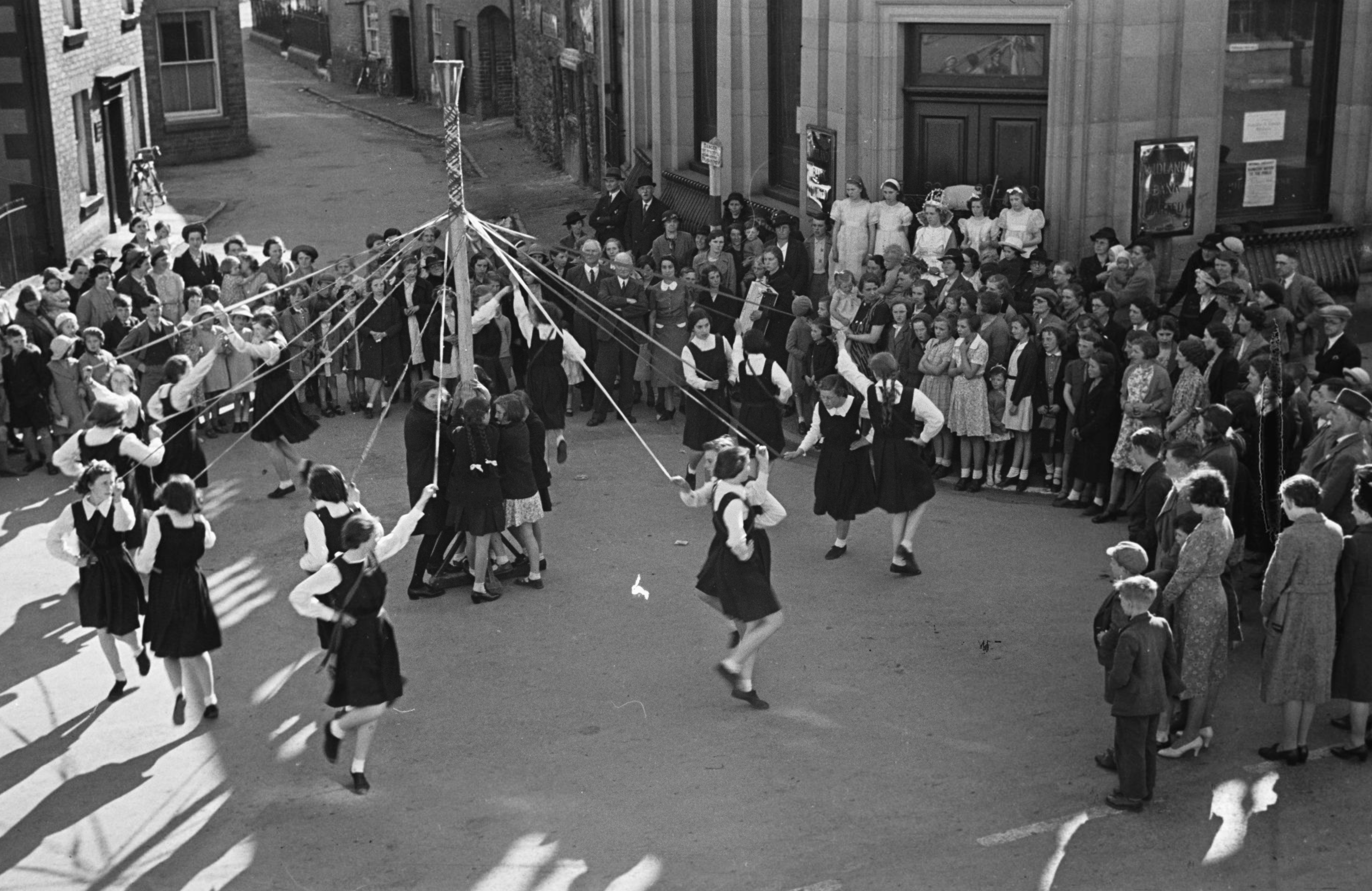
A maypole at Llanfyllin, Montgomeryshire (now Powys) on 1 May 1941

Calan Mai ([ˈkalan ˈmai̯] 'first day of May') or Calan Haf ([ˈkalan ˈhaːv] 'first day of Summer'), also historically called Cyntefin, is the Welsh celebration of May Day (1 May). It marks the beginning of summer and traditionally it involved festivities around bonfires, maypoles, and carol singing. Some of its traditions parallel the Gaelic May Day festival Beltane, and other May Day and Walpurgis Night traditions in Europe.

== Customs ==
Traditionally, bonfires (coelcerth) were lit at Calan Mai in parts of Wales. They were lit in Glamorgan until the 1830s. Nine men would gather branches of nine different trees, remove all metal, then light the fire by friction between wood. A fire kindled in such a way is known as a need-fire. Sometimes two fires were built side-by-side. Round cakes of oatmeal and brown-meal were sliced and placed in a bag, and participants each chose one; those who chose a brown-meal slice had to leap three times over flames, or run thrice between the bonfires. This was believed to ensure a good harvest. Calan Mai bonfires were also recorded in Montgomeryshire. The Scottish Highlands had very similar May Day (Beltane) bonfire customs, and historian Ronald Hutton suggests they were all survivals of a tradition that was once more widespread.

Maypoles were traditionally set up for Calan Mai. In Britain, the maypole was found primarily in areas of English influence. However, the earliest account is from a Welsh poem by Gryffydd ap Adda ap Dafydd in the mid-14th century, in which he described people making festivities around a tall birch pole at Llanidloes in Montgomeryshire.

Small groups of young men went about singing May carols (carolau Mai) or summer carols (carolau haf) at Calan Mai, and were rewarded with food and drink.

Other traditions:

- May Eve (Nos Galan Haf) is considered an Ysbrydnos or 'spirit night', when spirits are wandering and divination is possible.
- On May Eve, villagers gather hawthorn (Welsh: draenen wen, 'white-thorn') branches and flowers which they would then use to decorate the outside of their houses, celebrating new growth and fertility.
- In Anglesey and Caernarfonshire it would be common on May Eve to have chwarae gwr gwellt 'playing straw man' or crogi gwr gwellt 'hanging a straw man'. A man who had lost his sweetheart to another man would make a man out of straw and put it somewhere in the vicinity of where the girl lived. The straw man represented her new sweetheart and had a note pinned to it. Often the situation led to a fight between the two men at the May Fair.
- Being the time between Summer and Winter, Calan Haf would be the time to stage a mock fight between the two seasons. The man representing Winter carried a stick of blackthorn (Welsh: draenen ddu, 'black-thorn') and a shield that had pieces of wool stuck on it to represent snow. The man representing Summer was decorated with garlands of flowers and ribbons and carried a willow-wand which had spring flowers tied on it with ribbons. A mock battle took place in which the forces of Winter threw straw and dry underbrush at the forces of Summer who retaliated with birch branches, willow (Welsh: helygen) rods, and young ferns (Welsh: rhedyn). Eventually the forces of Summer would win and a May King and Queen were chosen and crowned, after which there was feasting, dancing, games and drinking until the next morning.
- May Day was the time that the twmpath chwarae or 'tump for playing' (a kind of village green) was officially opened. Through the summer months in some villages the people would gather on the twmpath chwarae in the evenings to dance and play various sports. The green was usually situated on the top of a hill and a mound was made where the fiddler or harpist sat. Sometimes branches of oak decorated the mound and the people would dance in a circle around it.
- Common drinks during Calan Mai festivities fermented honey (mead) sometimes flavoured with herbs or spices (metheglin). Sometimes it was made of herbs, including woodruff, a sweet-smelling herb which was often put in wine in times past to make a man merry and act as a tonic for the heart and liver. Elderberry and rhubarb wines were popular as well as various beers.
