= S. J. Tucker =

American singer-songwriter

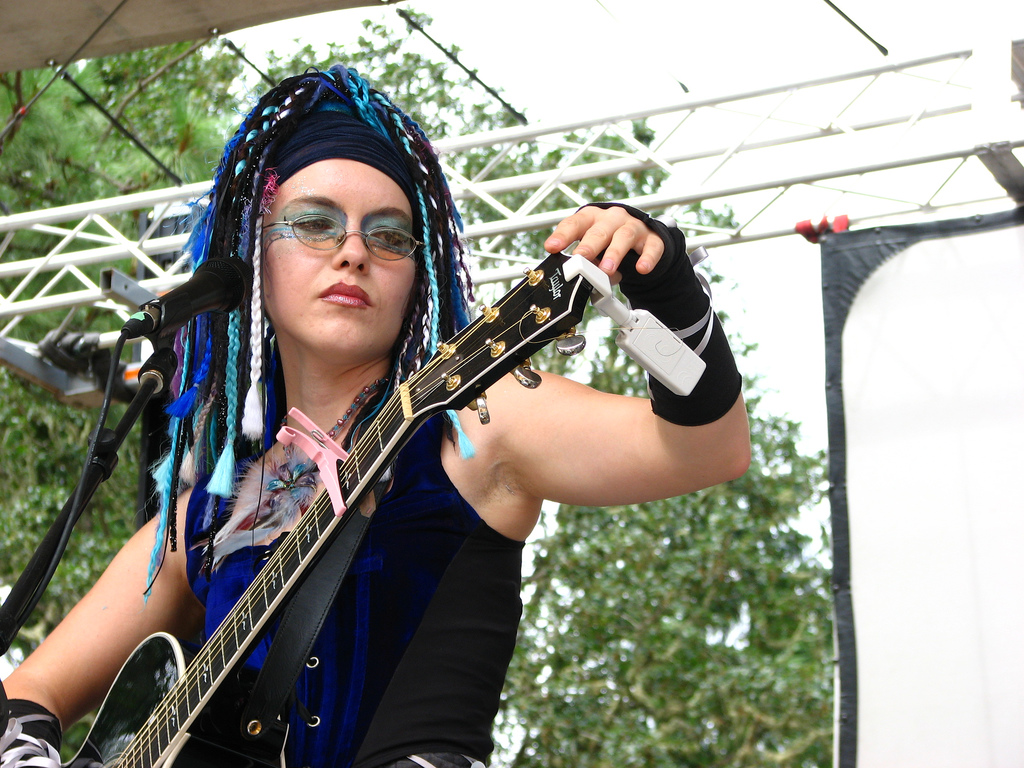

Background information
- Also known as: Sooj, Skinny White Chick
- Born: Susan Jane Tucker; February 22, 1980 (age 45)
- Genres: Rock, folk
- Occupations: Musician, singer-songwriter, performance artist
- Instruments: Guitars, vocals, bass, keyboards, drums
- Years active: 1999–present
- Labels: Skinny White Chick
- Website: sjtucker.com

S. J. Tucker (born February 22, 1980) is an Arkansas-born North American singer-songwriter. Originally inspired by alternative folk rock artists like Joni Mitchell, Jeff Buckley and Ani DiFranco, Tucker – also called "Sooj" or "Skinny White Chick" – soon branched out to assume a more diverse identity. Like The Beatles – another cited influence – Tucker prefers an eclectic approach to songcraft. Since her debut album in 2004, Tucker's work has integrated elements of electronica, filk, spoken word, world music, industrial metal, and – with the troupe Fire & Strings – fire-spinning.

== Musical style ==
Based around the "guitar troubadour" model, Tucker's work originally featured acoustic guitar, multitracked vocals, low-key bass guitar and hand drum parts. In concert, Tucker often appears with a hollow-body guitar and a microphone. However, her third album, Sirens, featured backup musicians, a diversity of musical approaches and elaborate vocal harmonies. Subsequent releases have favored a world fusion approach over guitar folk arrangements. Stylistically, Tucker has been compared to Ani DiFranco, Fiona Apple, and Joni Mitchell, among other singer-songwriters.

== Career ==
Raised in an art-oriented family, Tucker began singing during childhood. Disgusted by "mainstream" employment, she began performing as a singer and guitarist while at college in 1997, formed her first band, Skinny White Chick, in 1999, recording one self-produced EP over the subsequent years. Tucker, who identifies as bisexual, also found a home in the Gay and Lesbian community, performing monthly at the Memphis, Tennessee Gay and Lesbian Community Center.

After performing as a featured artist at a string of festivals in 2002, Tucker recorded an EP called Skinny & the Semi-pros with the members of Memphis band Stout. Collecting funds from the sale of that EP and from concert earnings, Tucker next decided to self-produce her first LP. The result, Haphazard, was recorded in the studio over a handful of days and released on March 27, 2004. That album was later cited as one of the "albums no Pagan should be without" in newWitch magazine. From then on, Tucker began touring full-time, living on the road, in hotel rooms, and in space provided by friends, managers and fans.

In 2004, Tucker met fire-spinner Kevin Wiley during an outdoor festival in Colorado. After a minor accident in which Wiley "hit her in the eye with a flaming ball of Kevlar", the two became lovers, partners and fellow performers. Combining their respective skills and talents, the couple formed the Fire & Strings troupe in 2004, and began performing at the Burning Man festival and across the United States in 2005.

Since beginning her career, Tucker has recorded, appeared and performed with numerous writers, musicians, activists and bands. Sharing stages with Phyllis Curott, Gaia Consort, Wendy Rule, Selena Fox, Catherynne M. Valente, Incus, Emerald Rose, Rev. Barry W. Lynn, Alexander James Adams, SONA, Celia, and many others, Tucker has incorporated elements of social activism, neopagan spirituality and mythpunk fantasy into her repertoire. A 2006 rally in Washington to protest the Sgt. Patrick Stewart case was later portrayed in the song "Mandolin Holy Man." More recently, Tucker performed several songs from her neopagan album Blessings at the 2007 Samhain festival in Salem, Massachusetts.

=== Awards ===
Tucker was nominated for both the Best Performer and Best Writer/Composer Pegasus Awards for 2010. She won the Best Performer award, finishing behind Heather Dale for the Best Writer/Composer award. Tucker won the Pegasus Award for Best Writer/Composer in 2011.

== Collaborations ==
Aside from appearances on albums by Gaia Consort, Incus and Celia, Tucker has collaborated on several book/CD crossovers with author Catherynne M. Valente. Inspired by Valente's novel The Orphan's Tales: In the Night Garden, Tucker recorded the album For the Girl in the Garden and the songs "The Girl in the Garden" and "Shipful of Monsters" as "official companions" to that novel. The two also collaborated on the song "The Drowning" from Sirens, and–with K Wiley – performed selections from the novel at various fantasy conventions. Tucker's fire-spinning inspired Valente to include a fantasy version of her–the Fire-Dancer – in the 2007 follow-up novel The Orphan's Tales: In the Cities of Coin and Spice. This, in turn, inspired Tucker's song "Firebird’s Child" on the album Blessings, released that same year. The two artists further collaborated on the album Solace & Sorrow, released in conjunction with In the Cities of Coin and Spice, on the same publication day.

Tucker and Valente toured the East Coast together in 2007 to promote Tucker's albums and The Orphan's Tales.

Another collaboration of sorts appeared by way of "The Wendy Trilogy" –"Wendy on Board," "Red-Handed Jill" and "Green-Eyed Sue/Sue's Jig." A three-part saga inspired by J. M. Barrie's Peter and Wendy, this trio of songs follow Wendy Darling in her career as a pirate. Taken from the album Sirens, the Wendy Trilogy assumes that Wendy took Captain Hook up on his offer to turn buccaneer. The saga sees Wendy join the crew, grow strong, fall out with Peter Pan, and finally attack Hook after hearing him plot to marry her off to Bluebeard. In the ensuing fight, Peter drops Hook into the waiting mouth of the crocodile–a coincidental fate, given that the trilogy shares an album with the song "Alligator in the House" (see below). From there, Wendy takes command of the pirate ship, trains an all-girl crew, and becomes a Fairyland celebrity. Eventually she retires, handing the captaincy off to first mate Green-Eyed Sue. An illustration by artist Amy Brown was made for a single release of the Wendy Trilogy – yet to be released as a full EP of pirate songs entitled Pirate Girls, and "Alligator in the House" also appears on the album Tricky Pixie–Live! and Mythcreants, releases from Tucker's West Coast project Tricky Pixie.

== Tricky Pixie ==
Founded in 2006, Tricky Pixie combines music and songwriting from Tucker, Betsy Tinney of Gaia Consort and Alexander James Adams–formerly folk artist Heather Alexander. Tinney and Tucker also collaborated on several other songs, including one of Tucker's "signature songs," "Alligator in the House". The band made their debut at Soulfood Books in Redmond, WA. The recording of this first performance would become the Tricky Pixie – Live! album. The band also appeared–with Celia – at the 2007 Faerieworlds festival, but due to the divergent careers of the three band members, as of 2008 Tricky Pixie performs only in the winter and summer months.

== Discography ==
=== Albums ===
- Haphazard (2004)
- Tangles (2005)
- Tales from the Road (live, 2005)
- Sirens (2006)
- For the Girl in the Garden (2006)
- Blessings (2007)
- Tricky Pixie–Live! (2007) (with Tricky Pixie)
- Solace & Sorrow (2007)
- Mythcreants (2008) (with Tricky Pixie)
- Mischief (2010)
- Rootless (2011)
- Ember Days (2013)
- Wonders (2013)
- Stolen Season (2015)

=== EPs ===
- The Nathan Session (2001)
- Skinny & The Semi-Pros (2003)
- To Black Rock with Love: Burning Man 2005 (2005)
- Fire, Hope, Fear: Burning Man 2006 (2006)

=== Singles ===
- "Go Away, God Boy!" (2006)
- "The Wendy Trilogy" (2007) (based on the character of Wendy Darling)
- "Rootless" (2011)
- "Cold Sunshine" (2011)
