= Arm of the sea =

An arm of the sea (or sea arm) may refer to:

- a sea loch
- an ocean arm
- Arms of the Sea, a 2006 album by Celtic musician Heather Alexander
- Nullah, in Hindi
- Gulf of Lune, a fictitious sea arm in J.R.R. Tolkien's Middle-earth fantasy universe
