= Catherynne M. Valente =

American writer (born 1979)

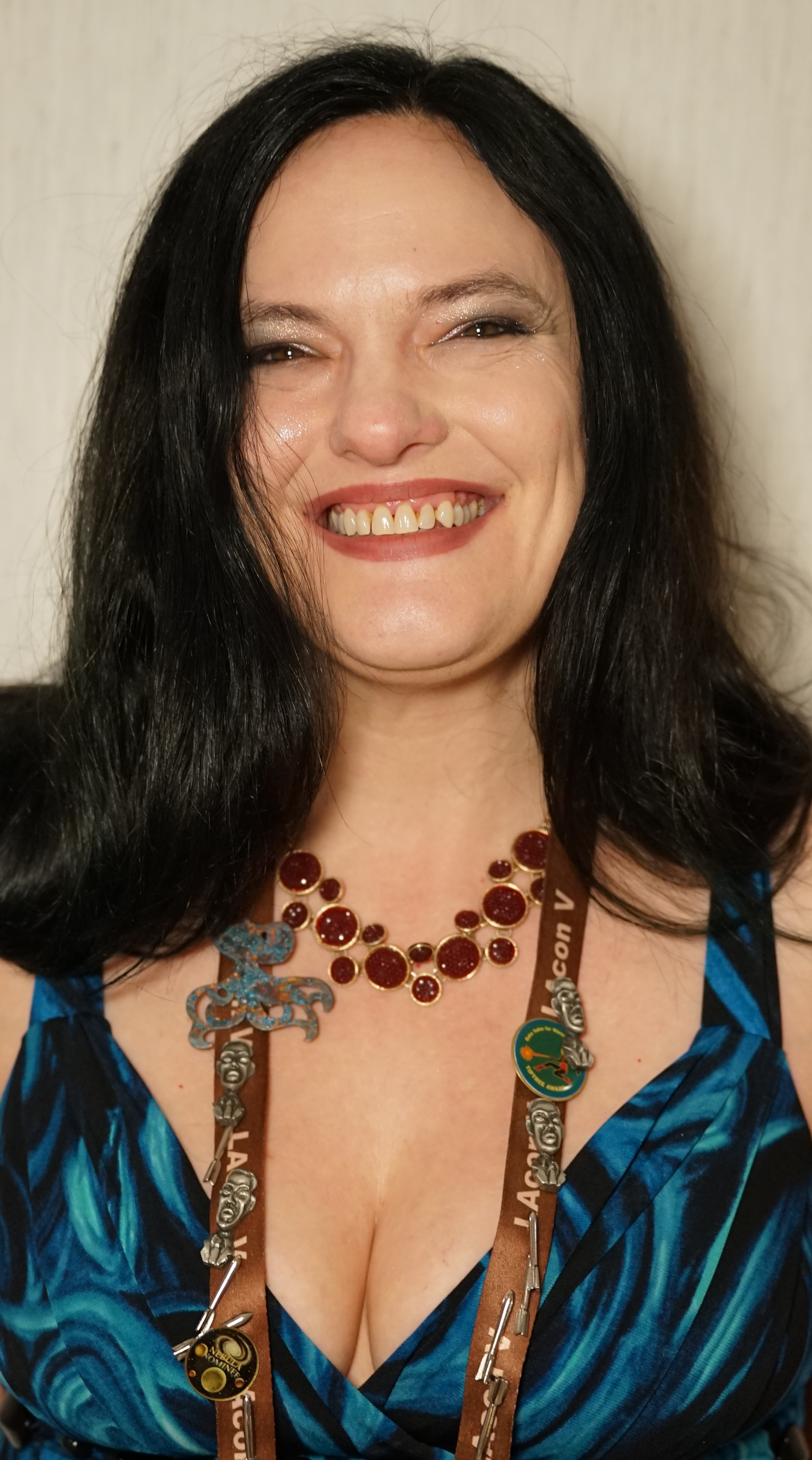
- Valente at Worldcon 2026
- Born: May 5, 1979 (age 47); Seattle, Washington, U.S.
- Education: UC San Diego; University of Edinburgh
- Occupations: Poet; novelist; literary critic
- Writing career
- Genres: Postmodern, fantasy, mythpunk
- Notable awards: James Tiptree Jr. (2006); Million Writers Award (2007); Rhysling Award (2007); Mythopoeic Award (2008); Andre Norton Award (2009); Locus Award (2014)
- Website: catherynnemvalente.com

Catherynne Morgan Valente (born May 5, 1979) is an American fiction writer, poet, and literary critic. For her speculative fiction novels she has won the annual James Tiptree, Jr. Award, Andre Norton Award, and Mythopoeic Award. Her short fiction has appeared in Clarkesworld Magazine, the anthologies Salon Fantastique and Paper Cities, and numerous "Year's Best" volumes. Her critical work has appeared in the International Journal of the Humanities as well as other essay collections.

== Career ==
Valente's 2009 book Palimpsest won the Lambda Award for LGBT Science Fiction, Fantasy, or Horror. Her two-volume series The Orphan's Tales won the 2008 Mythopoeic Award, and its first volume, The Orphan's Tales: In the Night Garden, won the 2006 James Tiptree Jr. Award and was nominated for the 2007 World Fantasy Award. In 2012, Valente won three Locus Awards: Best Novelette (White Lines on a Green Field), Best Novella (Silently and Very Fast) and Best YA Novel (The Girl Who Circumnavigated Fairyland in a Ship of Her Own Making).

In 2009, she donated her archive to the Science Fiction and Fantasy Writers of America (SFWA) Collection in the department of Rare Books and Special Collections at Northern Illinois University.

She is a regular panelist on the podcast SF Squeecast.

=== Multimedia and mythpunk ===
Valente tours with singer/songwriter S. J. Tucker, who has composed albums based on Valente's work. The pair perform reading concerts featuring dancers, aerial artists, art auctions featuring jewelry and paintings based on the novels, and other performances.

Valente is active in the crowdfunding movement of online artists. Her novel The Girl Who Circumnavigated Fairyland in a Ship of Her Own Making was the first online, crowdfunded book to win a major literary award before traditional publication.

In a 2006 blog post, Valente coined the term mythpunk as a joke for describing her own and other works of challenging folklore-based fantasy. Valente and other critics and writers have discussed mythpunk as a subgenre of mythic fiction that starts in folklore and myth and adds elements of postmodernist literary techniques.

== Personal life ==
In a 2025 interview published in Vector, Valente stated that she is queer and has ADHD.

== Works ==
=== Novels and Novellas ===
==== Standalone adult works ====
- The Labyrinth. Prime Books. August 1, 2004. ISBN 9781894815659.
- The Ice Puzzle. January 1, 2005. ASIN B0DTT29DWK.
- Yume No Hon: The Book of Dreams. Prime Books. July 1, 2005. ISBN 9780809510870.
- The Grass-Cutting Sword. Prime Books. December 26, 2006. ISBN 9780809556779.
- Palimpsest. Bantam Spectra. March 2009. ISBN 9780553385762.
- Deathless. Tor Books. March 29, 2011. ISBN 9780765326300.
- Silently and Very Fast. WSFA Press. October 14, 2011. ISBN 9781936896004.
- Six-Gun Snow White. Subterranean Press. February 28, 2013. ISBN 9781596065529.
- Speak Easy. Subterranean Press. August 31, 2015. ISBN 9781596067271.
- Radiance. Tor Books. October 20, 2015. ISBN 9781466821484.
- The Refrigerator Monologues. Illustrated by Annie Wu. June 6, 2017. ISBN 9781481459341.
- The Past Is Red. Tordotcom. July 20, 2021. ISBN 9781250301130.
- Comfort Me with Apples. Tordotcom. October 26, 2021. ISBN 9781250816214.

==== Standalone young adult works ====
- The Glass Town Game. Illustrated by Rebecca Green. Margaret K. McElderry Books. September 5, 2017. ISBN 9781481476966.
- Osmo Unknown and the Eightpenny Woods. Margaret K. McElderry Books. April 26, 2022. ISBN 9781481476997.

==== The Orphan's Tales ====
1. The Orphan's Tales: In the Night Garden. Vol. 1. Illustrated by Michael Kaluta. Spectra Books. October 31, 2006. ISBN 9780553384031.
2. The Orphan's Tales: In the Cities of Coin and Spice. Vol. 2. Illustrated by Michael Kaluta. Spectra Books. October 30, 2007. ISBN 9780553384048.

==== Fairyland ====
- The Girl Who Circumnavigated Fairyland in a Ship of Her Own Making. Illustrated by Ana Juan. Feiwel & Friends. May 10, 2011. ISBN 9780312649616. (Note: The novel was originally self-published online in 2009 before being acquired by a traditional publishing company)
- The Girl Who Fell Beneath Fairyland and Led the Revels There. Illustrated by Ana Juan. Feiwel & Friends. October 2, 2012. ISBN 9780312649623.
- The Girl Who Soared Over Fairyland and Cut the Moon in Two. Illustrated by Ana Juan. Feiwel & Friends. October 1, 2013. ISBN 9781250023506.
- The Boy Who Lost Fairyland. Illustrated by Ana Juan. Feiwel & Friends. March 3, 2015. ISBN 9781250023490.
- The Girl Who Raced Fairyland All the Way Home. Illustrated by Ana Juan. Feiwel & Friends. March 1, 2016. ISBN 9781250023513.

==== A Dirge for Prester John ====
1. The Habitation of the Blessed. Night Shade Books. January 10, 2010. ISBN 9781597802789.
2. The Folded World. Night Shade Books. November 1, 2011. ISBN 9781597802031.

==== The Space Opera ====
1. Space Opera. Simon & Schuster. April 10, 2018. ISBN 9781481497497.
2. Space Oddity. Saga Press. September 24, 2024. ISBN 9781534454521.

==== Media tie-ins ====
- Mass Effect: Andromeda Annihilation. Titan Books. November 6, 2018. ISBN 9781785651588.
- Minecraft: The End. Del Rey Books. December 3, 2019. ISBN 9780399180729.

=== Fiction collections ===
- This Is My Letter to the World: The Omikuji Project, Cycle One. Kinsenka Press. April 28, 2010. ISBN 9780557441181.
- Ventriloquism. PS Publishing. December 1, 2010. ISBN 9781848631250.
- Myths of Origin: Four Short Novels. Wyrm Publishing. December 6, 2011. ISBN 9781890464141. (Note: Omnibus collection containing The Labyrinth, Yume No Hon: The Book of Dreams, The Grass-Cutting Sword, and Under in the Mere)
- The Melancholy of Mechagirl. Haikasoru. July 16, 2013. ISBN 9781421556130.
- The Bread We Eat in Dreams. Subterranean Press. December 31, 2013. ISBN 9781596065826.
- The Future Is Blue. Subterranean Press. July 31, 2018. ISBN 9781596068742.

=== Poetry collections ===
- Music of a Proto-Suicide (2004)
- Apocrypha (2005)
- Oracles: A Pilgrimage (2006)
- The Descent of Inanna (2006)
- A Guide to Folktales in Fragile Dialects. Norilana Books. May 31, 2008. ISBN 9781934648353.

=== Short fiction ===
- "The Oracle Alone" Music of a Proto-Suicide (2004)
- "Ghosts of Gunkanjima" Papaveria Press (2005)
- "The Maiden-Tree" Cabinet des Fees (2005)
- "Bones Like Black Sugar" Fantasy Magazine (2005)
- "Psalm of the Second Body" PEN Book of Voices (2005)
- "Ascent Is Not Allowed" The Minotaur in Pamplona (2005)
- "Thread: A Triptych" Lone Star Stories (2006)
- "Urchins, While Swimming" Clarkesworld Magazine (2006)
- "Milk and Apples" Electric Velocipede (2006)
- "Temnaya and the House of Books" Mythic (2006)
- "A Grey and Soundless Tide" Salon Fantastique (2006)
- "A Dirge For Prester John" Interfictions (2007)
- "The Ballad of the Sinister Mr. Mouth" Lone Star Stories (2007)
- "La Serenissima" Endicott Studio (2007)
- "The Proslogium of the Great Lakes" Farrago's Wainscot (2007)
- "A Buyer's Guide to Maps of Antarctica" Clarkesworld Magazine (2008)
- "Tales of Beaty and Strangeness: City of Blind Delights" Clockwork Phoenix (2008)
- "The Hanged Man" Farrago's Wainscot (2008)
- "An Anthology of Urban Fantasy: Palimpsest" Paper Cities, ed. Ekaterina Sedia (2008)
- "The Harpooner at the Bottom of the World" Spectra Pulse (2008)
- "Golubash, or, Wine-War-Blood-Elegy" Federations (2009)
- "The Secret History of Mirrors" Clockwork Phoenix 2 (2009)
- "A Book of Villainous Tales:A Delicate Architecture" Troll's Eye View (2009)
- "The Radiant Car Thy Sparrows Drew" Clarkesworld Magazine (2009)
- "The Anachronist's Cookbook" Steampunk Tales (2009)
- "A Between Books Anthology: Proverbs of Hell" The Stories in Between (2010)
- "The Days of Flaming Motorcycles" Dark Faith (2010)
- "Secretario" Weird Tales (2010)
- "Thirteen Ways of Looking at Space/Time" Clarkesworld Magazine (2010)
- "How to Become a Mars Overlord" Lightspeed (2010)
- "15 Panels Depicting the Sadness of the Baku and the Jotai" Haunted Legends (2010)
- "In the Future When All's Well" Teeth (2011)
- "A Voice Like a Hole" Welcome to Bordertown (2011)
- "The Wolves of Brooklyn" Fantasy Magazine (2011)
- "The Girl Who Ruled Fairyland—For a Little While" Tor.com (2011)
- "White Lines on a Green Field" Subterranean Magazine (2011)

=== Nonfiction ===
- Introduction to Jane Eyre (Illustrated) (2007)
- "Regeneration X" in Chicks Dig Time Lords (2010)
- Indistinguishable from Magic (2014)

=== Anthologies edited ===
- Nebula Awards Showcase 55 (2021)

== Awards and honors ==
=== Awards for literature ===
Year	Work	Award	Category	Result	Ref.
2006	The Orphan's Tales (vol. 1)	James Tiptree Jr. Award	—	Won	
2007	The Eight Legs of Grandmother Spider	Rhysling Award	Long Poem	Finalist	
2007	The Orphan's Tales (vol. 1)	World Fantasy Award	Novel	Finalist	
2007	"Urchins, While Swimming"	Million Writers Award	—	Won	
2008	"The Seven Devils of Central California"	Rhysling Award	Long Poem	Won	
2008	The Orphan's Tales (vol. 1 & 2)	Mythopoeic Award	Adult Literature	Won	
2009	"A Buyer's Guide to Maps of Antarctica"	World Fantasy Award	Short Fiction	Finalist	
2009	"Damascus Divides the Lovers by Zero, or the City is Never Finished" (with Amal El-Mohtar)	Rhysling Award	Long Poem	Finalist	
2009	The Girl Who Circumnavigated Fairyland in a Ship of Her Own Making	Andre Norton Award	—	Won	
2010	Palimpsest	Hugo Award	Novel	Finalist	
2010	Palimpsest	Lambda Literary Award	Science Fiction, Fantasy, and Horror	Won	
2010	Palimpsest	Locus Award	Fantasy Novel	Finalist	
2010	Palimpsest	Mythopoeic Award	Adult Literature	Finalist	
2011	"The Days of Flaming Motorcycles"	WSFA Small Press Award	—	Finalist	
2011	Deathless	James Tiptree Jr. Award	—	Longlisted	
2011	Silently and Very Fast	Nebula Award	Novella	Finalist	
2011	"Thirteen Ways of Looking at Space/Time"	Locus Award	Short Story	Finalist	
2012	"The Bread We Eat in Dreams"	Locus Award	Short Story	Finalist	
2012	Deathless	Locus Award	Fantasy Novel	Finalist	
2012	Deathless	Mythopoeic Awards	Adult Literature	Finalist	
2012	"Fade to White"	Nebula Award	Novelette	Finalist	
2012	"Fade to White"	Sidewise Award	Short Form	Finalist	
2012	The Girl Who Circumnavigated Fairyland in a Ship of Her Own Making	Locus Award	Young Adult Book	Won	
2012	Silently and Very Fast	Hugo Award	Novella	Finalist	
2012	Silently and Very Fast	Locus Award	Novella	Won	
2012	Silently and Very Fast	Theodore Sturgeon Award	—	Finalist	
2012	Silently and Very Fast	World Fantasy Award	Novella	Finalist	
2012	"White Lines on a Green Field"	Locus Award	Novelette	Won	
2013	"Fade to White"	Hugo Award	Novelette	Finalist	
2013	The Girl Who Fell Beneath Fairyland and Led the Revels There	Locus Award	Young Adult Book	Finalist	
2013	Six-Gun Snow White	Nebula Award	Novella	Finalist	
2014	The Bread We Eat in Dreams	Locus Award	Collection	Finalist	
2014	The Girl Who Soared Over Fairyland	Locus Award	Young Adult Book	Won	
2014	Six-Gun Snow White	Hugo Award	Novella	Finalist	
2014	Six-Gun Snow White	Locus Award	Novella	Won	
2014	Six-Gun Snow White	World Fantasy Award	Novella	Finalist	
2015	Radiance	James Tiptree Jr. Award	—	Honor List	
2016	"The Long Goodnight of Violet Wild"	Eugie Award	—	Won	
2017	The Girl Who Circumnavigated Fairyland in a Ship of Her Own Making; The Girl Who Fell Beneath Fairyland and Led the Revels There	Grand Prix de l'Imaginaire	Foreign Young Adult Novel	Won	
2017	"The Future Is Blue" (novelette)	Locus Award	Novelette	Finalist	
2017	"The Future Is Blue" (novelette)	Theodore Sturgeon Award	—	Won	
2017	"The Limitless Perspective of Master Peek, or, the Luminescence of Debauchery"	Eugie Award	—	Finalist	
2018	The Refrigerator Monologues	Locus Award	Collection	Finalist	
2019	The Future Is Blue (collection)	British Fantasy Award	Collection	Finalist	
2019	The Future Is Blue (collection)	Locus Award	Collection	Finalist	
2019	Space Opera	Campbell Memorial Award	Science Fiction Novel	Finalist	
2019	Space Opera	Hugo Award	Novel	Finalist	
2019	Space Opera	Locus Award	Science Fiction Novel	Finalist	
2021	Comfort Me with Apples	Shirley Jackson Award	Novella	Finalist	
2022	Comfort Me with Apples	Locus Award	Novella	Finalist	
2022	The Past Is Red	Hugo Award	Novella	Finalist	
2022	The Past Is Red	Locus Award	Novella	Finalist	
2022	The Past Is Red	Ursula K. Le Guin Prize	—	Finalist	
2022	"L'Esprit de L'Escalier"	Eugie Award	—	Finalist	
2022	"L'Esprit de L'Escalier"	Hugo Award	Novelette	Finalist	
2022	"L'Esprit de L'Escalier"	Locus Award	Novelette	Finalist	
2022	"The Sin of America"	Hugo Award	Short Story	Finalist	
2022	"The Sin of America"	Locus Award	Short Story	Finalist	
2023	"The Difference Between Love and Time"	Hugo Award	Novelette	Finalist	
2023	"The Difference Between Love and Time"	Locus Award	Novelette	Finalist	
2023	Osmo Unknown and the Eightpenny Woods	Lodestar Award for Best Young Adult Book	—	Finalist	
2024	The Best of Catherynne M. Valente, Volume One	Locus Award	Collection	Finalist	
2025	Space Oddity	Locus Award	Science Fiction Novel	Finalist	
2025	Space Opera	Seiun Award	Translated Novel	Finalist	
2026	"When He Calls Your Name"	Hugo Award	Novelette	Finalist	
2026	"When He Calls Your Name"	Locus Award	Novelette	Finalist	

=== Other awards ===
Year	Work	Award	Category	Result	Ref.
2012	Apex Magazine (with Lynne M. Thomas and Jason Sizemore)	Hugo Award	Semiprozine	Finalist	
2012	SF Squeecast (with Lynne M. Thomas, Seanan McGuire, Paul Cornell, and Elizabeth Bear)	Hugo Award	Fancast	Won	
2013	SF Squeecast (with Lynne M. Thomas, Seanan McGuire, Paul Cornell, and Elizabeth Bear)	Hugo Award	Fancast	Won	
