= Fairyland (series) =

Series of novels by Catherynne M. Valente

Fairyland is a series of fantasy novels by Catherynne M. Valente. The novels follow a 12-year-old girl named September as she is spirited away from her average life to Fairyland.

In Valente's previous novel, Palimpsest, the narrator briefly discusses a book that one of the characters read as a child, The Girl Who Circumnavigated Fairyland in a Ship of Her Own Making. Valente then began a book by that title as a crowd-funded project and published the story online. The book was later picked up by Feiwel & Friends (Macmillan Publishers) for traditional publication. It is published in the UK by Much-in-Little (Constable & Robinson). Fairyland is a five-book series.

== The Girl Who Ruled Fairyland — For a Little While ==
The Girl Who Ruled Fairyland — For a Little While
- Author: Catherynne M. Valente
- Language: English
- Genre: Fiction
- Publisher: Tor.com
- Publication date: July 27, 2011
- Publication place: United States of America
- Media type: Print (e-book)
- Pages: 31 pages
- ISBN: 978-1-250-02350-6 (e-book)

On July 27, 2011, a short prequel was published as an ebook by Tor.com, and is available to read there. The Girl Who Ruled Fairyland—For a Little While features an opening illustration by Ana Juan, and tells the story of the young girl who became Fairyland's Good Queen Mallow.

== The Girl Who Circumnavigated Fairyland in a Ship of Her Own Making ==
The Girl Who Circumnavigated Fairyland in a Ship of Her Own Making
- Cover of the first edition of The Girl Who Circumnavigated Fairyland in a Ship of Her Own Making
- Author: Catherynne M. Valente
- Cover artist: Ana Juan (jacket illustration), Rich Deas (jacket design)
- Language: English
- Genre: Fiction, Novel
- Publisher: Feiwel & Friends; Constable & Robinson
- Publication date: May 2011
- Publication place: United States of America
- Media type: Print (Hardcover)
- Pages: 256 pages
- ISBN: 978-0-312-64961-6 (hardcover)
- OCLC: 670481840

Published in May 2011, The Girl Who Circumnavigated Fairyland was written before the prequel, but set after it. In this book, 12-year-old September has her first adventure in Fairyland.

=== Plot summary ===
An unseen narrator relates the story of September, a twelve-year-old girl from Omaha, Nebraska. September's father is a soldier at war in Europe and her mother works all day building airplane engines in a factory. One day a Green Wind visits her and she accepts his offer to take her to the great sea that borders Fairyland. September meets a gnome who gives her the ability to see Fairyland as it truly is before pushing her into that world. September's adventures continue in Fairyland, where she meets witches who give her a mission to steal a spoon back from the Marquess, who rules Fairyland with an iron fist. She teams up with A-Through-L, a wyvern whose absent father was a library, and thus considers himself a "Wyverary", a wyvern and library hybrid. When they find the Marquess, she hands over the witches' spoon in return for September's promise to retrieve a special sword from a casket in the Worsted Wood. September meets Saturday, a marid, and with A-Through-L they head for the Worsted Wood, where September finds the casket. The "sword" inside varies depending on the interests of the finder's mother, so September found not an actual sword, but a wrench because of her mother's work as a mechanic. As September escapes the Worsted Wood with the wrench, Saturday and A-Through-L are kidnapped and she sets about finding them. She must circumnavigate Fairyland in a ship of her own making to land at the Lonely Gaol, a jail at the bottom of the world. Along the way, she befriends a one-hundred-and-twelve-year-old paper lantern named Gleam, who helps to guide September to the Lonely Gaol. Once there, she learns the Marquess's full story and that she wants September to use the wrench to permanently separate Fairyland and the human world. September refuses and frees her friends from the Gaol. She uses Saturday's marid powers to wish everything well again, just before her time in Fairyland runs out—until the next spring, when she is bound by law to return.

=== Reception ===
Fairyland was published by Feiwel & Friends as a novel for young adults (10–14 years old), but has been embraced as a tale for all ages. The New York Times noted that "there’s a ton of grown-up humor—Valente mocks bureaucrats, Bergman and put-upon grad students, lost on kids but fun for oldsters." Neil Gaiman called it a "glorious balancing act between modernism and the Victorian Fairy Tale", while Peter S. Beagle said "Catherynne Valente is a find, at any age!"

Selected as a Best Book of the Month for May 2011, Amazon.com called Fairyland "a fantastical tale that's somewhere between Lewis Carroll and Terry Pratchett", stating that "Catherynne Valente's imaginative cast of characters and spirited prose turn what could be a standard heroine-on-a-quest story into something on par with the best (and weirdest) classics."

=== Awards and honors ===
In 2009, Fairyland, which was published online, won the Nebula/Andre Norton Award. It was the first book to win the award before traditional publication.

The Girl Who Circumnavigated Fairyland in a Ship of Her Own Making won the readers' choice CultureGeek Best Web Fiction of the Decade award for best web fiction of the 2000s.

In May 2011, it debuted at number 8 on the New York Times Bestseller list.

== The Girl Who Fell Beneath Fairyland and Led the Revels There ==
The Girl Who Fell Beneath Fairyland and Led the Revels There
- Author: Catherynne M. Valente
- Language: English
- Genre: Fiction, Novel
- Publisher: Feiwel & Friends; Constable & Robinson
- Publication date: October 2, 2012
- Publication place: United States of America
- Media type: Print (Hardcover)
- Pages: 258 pages
- ISBN: 978-0-312-64962-3 (hardcover)
- OCLC: 778422533

The second book of the Fairyland series was released on October 2, 2012.

In this story, September returns to Fairyland and attempts to reunite with her shadow, Halloween, who was lost in the previous book. It was published in the UK in January 2013.

== The Girl Who Soared Over Fairyland and Cut the Moon in Two ==
The Girl Who Soared Over Fairyland and Cut the Moon in Two
- Author: Catherynne M. Valente
- Cover artist: Ana Juan (jacket illustration), Rich Deas (jacket design)
- Language: English
- Genre: Fiction, Novel
- Publisher: Feiwel & Friends; Constable & Robinson
- Publication date: October 8, 2013
- Publication place: United States of America
- Media type: Print (Hardcover)
- Pages: 248 pages
- ISBN: 978-1-250-02350-6 (hardcover)
- OCLC: 825754042

The third book of the series was released on October 8, 2013.

In the third book, September is spirited away to the moon, reunited with her friends, and finds herself faced with saving Fairyland from a moon-Yeti with great and mysterious powers.

== The Boy Who Lost Fairyland ==
The Boy Who Lost Fairyland
- Author: Catherynne M. Valente
- Cover artist: Ana Juan (jacket illustration), Rich Deas (jacket design)
- Language: English
- Genre: Fiction, Novel
- Publisher: Feiwel & Friends; Constable & Robinson
- Publication date: March 2015
- Publication place: United States of America
- Media type: Print (Hardcover)
- Pages: 235 pages
- ISBN: 978-1-250-07332-7 (hardcover)
- OCLC: 895500807

The fourth book of the series was released in March, 2015.

The blurb released to USA Today summarizes the novel: "When a young troll named Hawthorn is stolen from Fairyland by the Red Wind, he becomes a changeling – a human boy -- in the strange city of Chicago, a place no less bizarre and magical than Fairyland when seen through trollish eyes. Left with a human family, Hawthorn struggles with his troll nature and his changeling fate. But when he turns twelve, he stumbles upon a way back home, to a Fairyland much changed from the one he remembers. Hawthorn finds himself at the center of a changeling revolution--until he comes face to face with a beautiful young Scientiste with very big, very red assistant."

== The Girl Who Raced Fairyland All the Way Home ==
The Girl Who Raced Fairyland All the Way Home
- Author: Catherynne M. Valente
- Cover artist: Ana Juan (jacket illustration)
- Language: English
- Genre: Fiction, Novel
- Publisher: Feiwel & Friends; Constable & Robinson
- Publication date: March 1, 2016
- Publication place: United States of America
- Media type: Print (Hardcover)
- Pages: 308 pages
- ISBN: 978-1-250-02351-3 (hardcover)
- OCLC: 905522953

The fifth book of the series was released in March, 2016.

In this final installment, September is accidentally crowned the Queen of Fairyland, and must contend with others who believe they have a claim on the throne. A Royal Race is set to decide the matter.
