= Elena's Serenade =

Picture Book by Campbell Geeslin

Elena's Serenade book front cover

Elena's Serenade is a children's picture book written by Campbell Geeslin (Dec. 5, 1925 - Aug. 30, 2017) and illustrated by Ana Juan. First published in 2004, it received the Parents' Choice Award the same year and was commended for the Americas Award for Children's and Young Adult Literature.

== Story ==
Elena dreams of becoming a glassblower like her father but he doesn't think it is a suitable job for a girl. So Elena sets off on her own, dressed as a boy, and travels to Monterrey, home of Mexico’s best glassblowers. The road is long but Elena has her songs to keep her company and soon, a few friends to sing for.

== Adaptation ==
Actress Sarah Wayne Callies has adapted the story into a screenplay, which has been optioned by French production company FullDawa Films. David Atrakchi is producing the animated feature and has received a grant from the French film board (CNC) for the Pilot.
