= Yume No Hon: The Book of Dreams =

2005 novel by Catherynne M. Valente

- Red cover of Yume No Hon: The Book of Dreams
- Author: Catherynne M. Valente
- Language: English
- Genre: Postmodern fantasy
- Published: 2005 (Prime Books)
- Publication place: United States
- Media type: Print (hardback)
- Pages: 152 pp
- ISBN: 0-8095-1087-1
- OCLC: 61207669

Yume No Hon: The Book of Dreams (2005) is a novel about a woman living as a hermit in ancient Japan written by Catherynne M. Valente.

== Plot summary ==
After her village is destroyed, Ayako lives alone in the mountains. Weaving through Ayako's life are her dreams; she explores the mythologies of goddesses from around the world and receives lessons from the river, mountain, and animals, who speak to her while the people from the village below dare only to leave offerings for her.

== Allusions ==
Ayako's dreams touch upon a variety of literary, mythological, and religious subjects, ranging from the Greek Sphinx to Isis' recreation of Osiris' body.
