= When He Calls Your Name =

2025 novellette by Catherynne M. Valente

"When He Calls Your Name" is a 2025 fantasy short story by Catherynne M. Valente. It was first published in Uncanny Magazine.

== Synopsis ==
When a woman's husband descends from adultery into madness, she chains him to their bed and confronts the supernatural being whose name he repeatedly chants: the red-haired, green-eyed vampire called Jolene.

== Reception ==
"When He Calls Your Name" was a finalist for the 2026 Hugo Award for Best Novelette, and the 2026 Locus Award for Best Novelette.

== Origins ==
Valente has stated that she had long been amused by interpreting the song ("Jolene") to mean that Jolene is a vampire, but that this punchline was not enough to support a story by itself, and thus she needed to properly construct "the emotional situation of the narrator (...), the state of her marriage, and her feelings toward Jolene herself."
