= The Grass-Cutting Sword =

Novel by Catherynne M. Valente

- Cover of The Grass-Cutting Sword, first edition
- Author: Catherynne M. Valente
- Language: English
- Genre: Postmodern novella
- Publisher: Prime Books
- Publication date: December 1, 2006
- Publication place: United States
- Media type: Paperback
- Pages: 127 pp
- ISBN: 0-8095-6230-8
- OCLC: 71827154

The Grass-Cutting Sword is a novella by Catherynne M. Valente. It was published by Prime Books in 2006.

== Plot summary ==
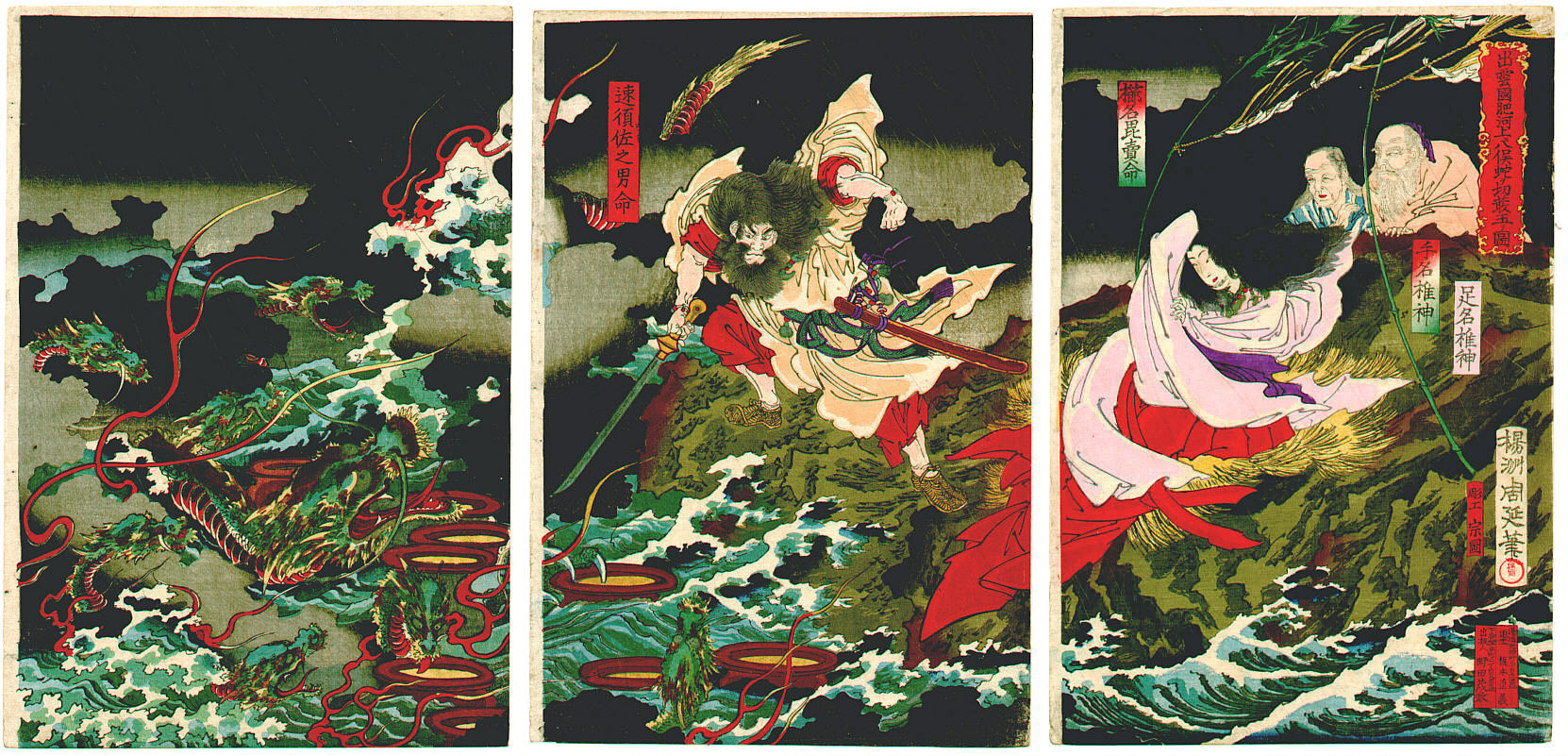
Susanoo slaying the Yamata no Orochi, by Toyohara Chikanobu

The tale is a postmodern interpretation of the Japanese folk-tale of Ame-no-Murakumo-no-Tsurugi ("Heaven's Cloud-Gathering Sword"), which is taken from the collection of folk-lore in the Kojiki. The action shifts between the journey of the storm-god Susanoo who has been banished to earth in human form by his sister, the Sun Goddess Amaterasu, as he attempts to slay the eight-headed serpent Yamata-no-Orochi. Valente also portrays the serpent's side of the story with a twist; the tale told by Orochi is intercut or added to by the seven maidens who have been sacrificed to the monster.
