= Salon Fantastique =

2006 fantasy short story anthology edited by Ellen Datlow and Terri Windling

Salon Fantastique: Fifteen Original Tales of Fantasy
- Front cover of first edition
- Author: Edited by Ellen Datlow and Terri Windling
- Cover artist: Jim Zaccaria
- Language: English
- Genre: Fantasy anthology
- Publisher: Thunder's Mouth Press
- Publication date: October 2006
- Publication place: United States
- Media type: Print (Trade paperback)
- Pages: 396 pp
- ISBN: 1-56025-833-0

Salon Fantastique: Fifteen Original Tales of Fantasy is a fantasy short story anthology edited by Ellen Datlow and Terri Windling.

== Contents ==
- La Fée Verte by Delia Sherman
- Dust Devil on a Quiet Street by Richard Bowes
- To Measure the Earth by Jedediah Berry
- A Gray and Soundless Tide by Catherynne M. Valente
- Concealment Shoes by Marly Youmans
- The Guardian of the Egg by Christopher Barzak
- My Travels with Al-Qaeda by Lavie Tidhar
- Chandail by Peter S. Beagle
- Down the Wall by Greer Gilman
- Femaville 29 by Paul Di Filippo
- Nottamun Town by Gregory Maguire
- Yours, Etc. by Gavin J. Grant
- The Mask of '67 by David Prill
- The Night Whiskey by Jeffrey Ford
- The Lepidopterist by Lucius Shepard

== Awards ==
The anthology won the 2007 World Fantasy Award for Best Anthology and received third place in the Locus Award for Best Anthology of 2007.
