= Faerie Queen (song) =

"Faerie Queen" is a song performed by Celtic artist Alexander James Adams on his first solo album, Wanderlust (released under the name Heather Alexander). The song's credits as given in the Heather Alexander Songbook are lyrics by Philip R. Obermarck and additional lyrics & music by Heather Alexander. Wanderlust was released in 1994.

== Synopsis ==
The heroine, a fiddler, is riding home when the song starts. Suddenly her horse becomes spooked and throws her off. As the heroine is trying to get up, she sees a band of faeries returning home from a hunt. Among them is the heroine's fiancé; although he is under the Faerie Queen's spell, she recognizes him by his eyes.

The heroine challenges the Faerie Queen to a duel with her fiancé as the stake. The queen agrees: they will both play the fiddle, and whichever one plays best will get to keep him. The faeries then hand her a black violin, and she plays an amazing melody. The heroine is disheartened, sure that she can never match the queen's performance, but then looks into her fiancé's eyes and is inspired by her love for him.

Her song, while initially somewhat melancholy, gradually builds in speed and intensity until there can be no doubt as to who is the better fiddler. Shocked, the Faerie Queen concedes that skill alone cannot compare to love and releases the heroine's fiancé.

== Cultural references ==
The song references the English myth of the Faerie Queen. It is also similar in plot to The Devil Went Down to Georgia, a song by the Charlie Daniels Band, although in this case the prize for winning the contest is a person rather than an object. The story of a woman freeing her man from the Queen of the Fairies may be a reference to the legend of Tam Lin.

== He of the Sidhe (Faerie King) ==
Alexander James Adams debuted a companion song, He of the Sidhe, at Norwescon 30 in 2007. Also called Faerie King, He of the Sidhe uses the same music but a different story and different fiddle solos. The hero of the song encounters the Faerie Queen as well, who references the "red-haired girl" from Faerie Queen.

He of the Sidhe is recorded on Adams' CD Balance of Nature. Alexander James Adams is credited for the lyrics and Heather Alexander for the music.
