= Space Opera (Valente novel) =

Science fiction novel by Catherynne M. Valente

- Author: Catherynne M. Valente
- Language: English
- Series: The Space Opera
- Release number: 1
- Publisher: Simon & Schuster, Saga Press
- Publication date: April 10, 2018
- Publication place: United States
- Pages: 304
- ISBN: 9781481497497
- Followed by: Space Oddity

Space Opera is a 2018 science fiction novel by Catherynne M. Valente, about a galactic version of the Eurovision Song Contest. It was first published by Saga Press.

== Synopsis ==
In order to join galactic civilization — rather than be declared non-sentient, and subsequently eradicated — humanity must participate in the Metagalactic Grand Prix, an interspecies music contest. Winning is not necessary, as long as the participants are not ranked last. However, when the alien emissaries supply a list of suggested musicians, the only entry on the list to not be dead or otherwise physically incapable of performing is Decibel Jones and the Absolute Zeroes, a washed-up, burnt-out glam rock trio with only two surviving members.

== Reception ==
Kirkus Reviews found it "charming", albeit "[l]ight on plot and originality", and drew parallels to Rick and Morty and the works of Daniel Pinkwater. Publishers Weekly praised Valente's "effervescent prose [as] wildly creative and often funny", while conceding that the novel's "frequent tangents can make for chaotic reading." In the Financial Times, James Lovegrove noted its "ripe satiric potential", but also its "somewhat meagre plot". The Guardian called it an "over-the-top, absurdist extravaganza" with a "frantic narrative" and "pertinent observations about diversity and gender politics".

Year	Award	Category	Result	Ref.
2019	Campbell Memorial Award	Science Fiction Novel	Finalist	
2019	Hugo Award	Novel	Finalist	
2019	Locus Award	Science Fiction Novel	Finalist	
2025	Seiun Award	Translated Novel	Finalist	

== Origin ==
Valente has described the book as the result of having been publicly dared, by one of her Twitter followers, to write a science fiction / fantasy version of Eurovision; an editor then offered to buy such a novel from her, sight unseen.

== Sequel ==
In 2019, Valente announced that she was working on a sequel, to be titled Space Oddity.

== Adaptation ==
As of September 2018, Space Opera was under development as a movie.
