= Comfort Me with Apples =

2021 novella by Catherynne M. Valente

- Author: Catherynne M. Valente
- Language: English
- Publisher: Tordotcom
- Publication date: 26 October 2021
- Publication place: United States
- Pages: 112 (Hardcover)
- ISBN: 9781250816214

Comfort Me with Apples is a 2021 novella by Catherynne M. Valente.

== Plot ==
Sophia awakens in a perfect home, stating that her marriage is perfect and that she was made for her husband. She lives in the gated community of Arcadia Gardens. The narrative is interspersed with regulations taken from the neighborhood's HOA covenants. These regulations slowly become more ominous as the plot progresses.

Sophia's husband is often absent for work, and she is never allowed to enter her home's basement. One day, Sophia notices that a drawer on her vanity is locked. She picks the lock, finding a large hairbrush and a lock of thick black hair which does not belong to her.

Sophia tells her neighbors Mrs. Lion, Mrs. Fish, and Mrs. Mink about the hairbrush. They assure her that Sophia's husband is deeply in love with her. Her neighbors introduce her to Mr. Semangelof, a music teacher. Mr. Semangelof claims that he has hunted down a woman who broke the neighborhood's rules. He asks Sophia if she is happy, causing her to question her own happiness for the first time.

One night, Sophia eats dinner alone; her husband is working late. Inside her knife block, she finds a human finger bone. Later, Sophia and her husband visit the Arcadia Gardens community amphitheater, where they see Mr. Semangelof. When Sophia asks about her husband about the criminal woman, he becomes angry and confronts Semangelof. Sophia watches as their neighbors perform a pantomime which depicts the life of Sophia and her husband. Mrs. Palfrey sits onstage at a set resembling Sophia’s room. Mrs. Palfrey brushes her long black wig, then locks the brush inside the vanity. Sophia’s husband is angered by the performance and leaves.

Sophia returns home alone. She retrieves the brush, hair, and finger bone. She searches throughout the house, uncovering bones, desiccated organs, and hair. Sophia realizes that the pieces belong to more than one victim. She breaks curfew and runs outside, finding herself in an unfamiliar park with a locked gate. She sees the world outside of Arcadia Gardens, which is a desert extending all the way to the horizon. A man named Cascavel appears. Cascavel asks Sophia if she is happy; she admits that she is not. Sophia realizes that she is not her husband’s first wife.

Cascavel offers Sophia a forbidden apple and the knowledge of her husband’s name, which she does not know. Cascavel states that almost all of the man’s previous wives have accepted his offer. Only one refused and escaped; this wife, Lilith, was the woman pursued by Mr. Semangelof. Lilith left Sophia the hairbrush as a clue. Cascavel hopes that Sophia will decline and venture into the world without her husband. Nevertheless, Sophia takes the apple and bites into it. Inside is a key, which Cascavel states will unlock the basement. He tells her that her husband’s name is Adam.

Sophia returns home and enters the basement, finding a grave already prepared for her. Adam confronts her and tells her about the failures of his previous wives. Despite many different attempts, Adam and his Father never successfully created a perfect wife who could please Adam. Adam states that he will destroy Sophia and try again. He promises to keep a piece of her body in the house so that he can visit her. Sophia hugs him tightly, and her fingernails cut into his neck. As she is strangled to death, Sophia hopes that the next wife will see the scars and be forewarned.

Adam’s next wife awakens in a perfect house, thinking to herself that she was made just for him. Her name is Eve.

== Background and style ==
The novella's title is taken from the Song of Solomon. The chapter titles are all varieties of apples.

== Reception and awards ==
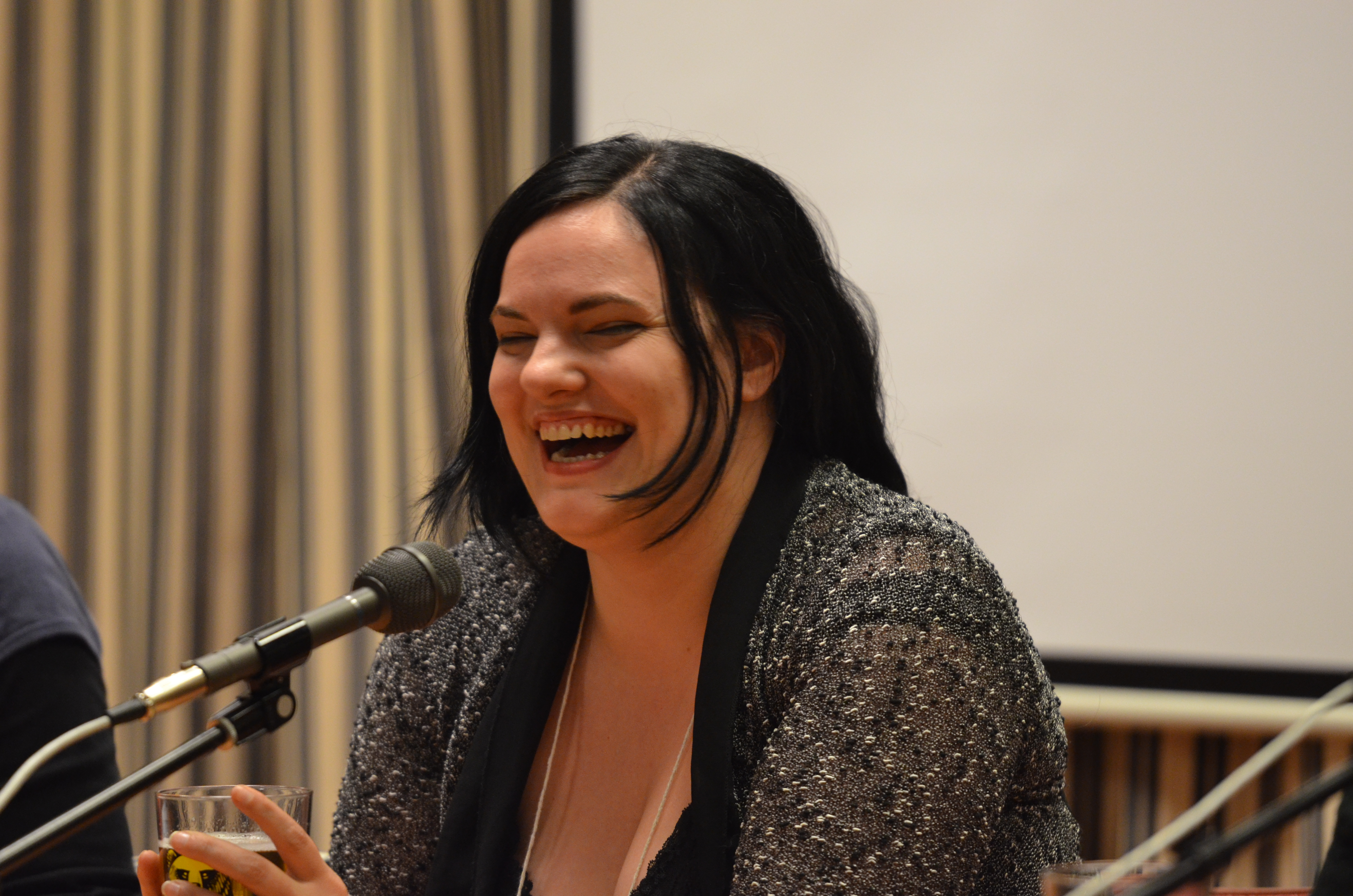
Catherynne M. Valente

Ryan Howse of Grimdark Magazine wrote that Comfort Me with Apples "isn’t quite a fairy tale retelling, nor a horror, nor a thriller. It’s very much its own story, without concern for genre." Howse praised the way in which the simple prose reflects Sophia's naivety, as well her character development over the course of a short page count.

Gary K. Wolfe of Locus called the premise an "effective engine of suspense," writing that readers may initially think that the story is a version of Bluebeard, The Stepford Wives, or "a surreal suburban fantasia" like Vivarium. Wolfe stated that the final reveal might be divisive, but praised Valente's pacing and foreshadowing. Wolfe concluded that the novella was "nearly as seamless and ominous as Sophia’s outsized house and her creepy neighborhood."

Martin Cahill of Reactor praised Valente's versatility as an author, stating that she "[transforms] the key ingredients of fables, folklore, myths, and more, gliding between the narrow spaces between genres..." Cahill praised the book's combination of domestic mystery and horror, stating that it explores "toxic masculinity and the harm husbands inflict on wives who do not fit their twisted visions of what bliss is..." The review concludes that the novel is "a bittersweet mystery you’ll savor every bite of," recommending that readers should go into the book with as little knowledge as possible.

The book was nominated for the 2021 Shirley Jackson Award for Best Novella.
