= The Orphan's Tales =

Fantasy series by Catherynne M. Valente

- In the Night Garden, In the Cities of Coin and Spice
- Author: Catherynne M. Valente
- Country: United States
- Language: English
- Genre: Fantasy, mythpunk
- Publisher: Bantam Spectra
- Published: 2006-2007

The Orphan's Tales is a fantasy series by Catherynne M. Valente with illustrations by Michael Kaluta. The two novels of the series, In the Night Garden and In the Cities of Coin and Spice, are in turn split into two books apiece. While three of these four books begin with a story told by the same young woman, her stories branch out into other stories, often narrated by a completely different character.

The series won the 2008 Mythopoeic Award for Adult Literature, and In the Night Garden was nominated for both the 2006 James Tiptree, Jr. Award and the 2007 World Fantasy Award.

== Plot summary ==
=== In the Night Garden ===
For the unrelated children's TV series with the same name and 100 episodes, see In The Night Garden.

First edition cover of In the Night Garden

Because of the strange tattoos around her eyes, a girl lives alone in the Sultan's gardens until the young prince dares to speak to her. When he visits, she tells him the stories that are inked on her skin.

The novel is split into two books, which revolve around two different casts of characters who inhabit the same world. Some characters appear in both books - as well as in the sequel, In the Cities of Coin and Spice; for example, the myths of the Stars run through numerous stories.

Book of the Steppe: Prince Leander escapes his castle in search of adventure. Once he is on the road, he kills a goose for food and is accosted by a witch who accuses him of murdering her daughter. As he tries to redeem himself, he learns about the witch's life on the steppe, quests for the skin of a beast, and discovers the truth of his family's history.

Book of the Sea: In the bitter cold of an icy country, to pass the time as they work, Sigrid the Netweaver tells a girl called Snow how she got her name: When she was young, she joined a group of monks traveling back to their temple and eventually entered into a temple of her own. Desperate to see the story to its conclusion, Snow convinces Sigrid to continue her quest to find the original Saint Sigrid.

=== In the Cities of Coin and Spice ===
First edition cover of In the Cities of Coin and Spice

The friendship between the girl and the prince strengthens as she begins to tell him the stories inked on her second eye. While in the first volume the children had the garden almost completely to themselves, now the marriage of the prince's sister Dinazade threatens their sanctuary. The stories grow similarly darker, revolving around the two titular cities: one where coins are made from bones of the children who work at the mint, and the second, an exotic city that is home to a variety of fantastic creatures such as a firebird, a clockwork woman, and sirens.

Like the first volume, In the Cities of Coin and Spice is composed of two books. Although each book focuses on a different set of characters and new locations, some of the stories run through each part of the series.

Book of the Storm: Seven, the seventh son in a farmer family, is ritualistically abandoned. Instead of being taken by the Stars, he is captured and forced to work at a mint, pressing coins out of bone. He escapes with Oubliette, a hulder, and they join a troupe of performers traveling across the countryside.

Book of the Scald: Unlike the other three books, in Scald, it is the prince who tells the story. From the girl's eye, he reads about a city besieged by an army of djinn, and the one djinni who defies her kingdom to stop the war.

== Allusions ==
The Orphan's Tales is written in the style of One Thousand and One Nights; like the latter's main character Scheherazade, the girl tells a story that then branches into more stories. The prince's sister is named Dinarzad, another reference to One Thousand and One Nights.

== Musical adaptations ==
Singer-songwriter S. J. Tucker's albums For the Girl in the Garden and Solace and Sorrow were inspired by the novel. The albums also have readings from the books.

== Awards and nominations ==
Year	Award	Category	Result	Ref.
2006	James Tiptree Jr. Award	—	Won	
2007	World Fantasy Award	Novel	Finalist	
2008	Mythopoeic Award	Adult Literature	Won	

== See also ==
- If On A Winter's Night A Traveler
