= Roger Olmos =

Spanish illustrator (born 1975)

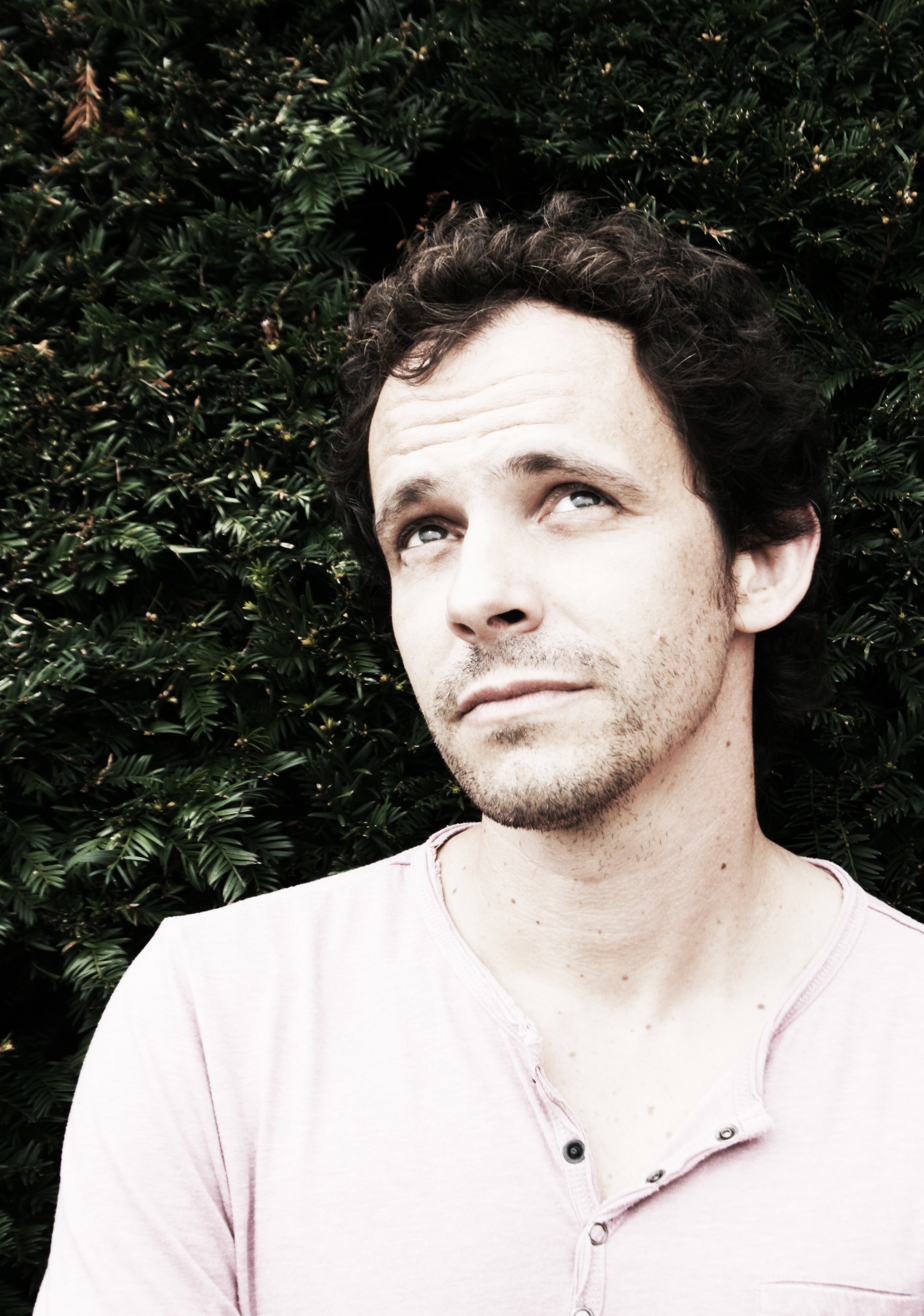
- Olmos in 2014
- Born: Roger Olmos Pastor; 23 December 1975 (age 50); Barcelona, Spain
- Education: Llotja Avinyò School of Arts and Crafts
- Known for: Illustration, animal rights and veganism activism
- Notable work: Sinpalabras, Tío Lobo, Amigos
- Style: Children's illustration, ethical and animal advocacy art
- Website: behance.net/rogerolmos

Roger Olmos Pastor (born 23 December 1975) is a Spanish illustrator. He is known for his work in children's literature, animal rights advocacy, and vegan advocacy. He has illustrated more than eighty books for Spanish and international publishers, and is noted for his collaborations on projects promoting animal rights, veganism, and ethical awareness.

== Early life and education ==
Olmos was born in Barcelona and developed an early interest in illustration, spending time in his father's home studio where he observed him drawing and painting. He was influenced by artists such as Brad Holland, Caza, and Brian Froud.

From 1995 to 2000, he studied at the Llotja Avinyò School of Arts and Crafts in Barcelona. Following this, he undertook a six-year apprenticeship as a scientific illustrator at the Dexeus Clinic in Barcelona, where he gained experience with textures and anatomical illustration.

== Career ==
In 1999, Olmos met his first publisher, Kalandraka, at the Bologna Children's Book Fair, and published his first book, Tío Lobo, with them the following year.

Since then, he has illustrated more than eighty books for a wide range of Spanish and international publishers, including Edelvives, Penguin Random House, Macmillan, Kalandraka, Oqo Editora, Ediciones B, La Galera, Teide, Anaya, Edebé, Planeta, Baula, #logosedizioni, Melhoramentos, Bromera, Editions 62, and Pirouette.

In addition to book illustration, Olmos has collaborated with advertising agencies, illustration schools, and television channels.

== Animal advocacy ==
Olmos is a vegan and an animal rights advocate. He collaborates with FAADA (Foundation for the Counselling and Action in Defense of Animals), a Barcelona-based animal protection organisation. This collaboration led to the publication of two books with the Italian publisher #logosedizioni: Sinpalabras / Senzaparole (2014) and Amigos (2017).

Sinpalabras received praise from figures such as Jane Goodall and J. M. Coetzee. Olmos described the book as "one of the most important and personal" of his career.

== Prizes and awards ==
- 1999, 2002 and 2005: selected for the Illustrator's Exhibition at the Bologna Children's Book Fair
- 2002: White Ravens Selection by the International Youth Library (Tío Lobo, kalandraka)
- 2004: White Ravens Selection by the International Youth Library (El Libro de las Fábulas, Ediciones B)
- 2006: White Ravens Special Mention (La cosa que más duele del mundo / The Thing That Hurts Most in the World, OQO)
- 2006: Premio Llibreter de Álbum Ilustrado (La cosa que más duele del mundo / The Thing That Hurts Most in the World, OQO)
- 2008: Premio Lazarillo de Álbum Ilustrado (El príncipe de los enredos, Edelvives)
- 2013: Premio Hospital Sant Joan de Déu (La màquina de pessigoles, la Galera)
- 2014: Best illustrated book for children, by the Spanish Ministry of Culture (Régalame un beso, Penguin Random House Mondadori)
- 2015: Best illustrated book for children, by the Spanish Ministry of Culture (La leyenda de Zum, Nubeocho ediciones)
- 2015: Premio 400Colpi, Torredilibri (Senzaparole, #logosedizioni)
- 2017: Selected as one of the most representative illustrators in Catalonia, Guest of Honour at the Bologna Children's Book Fair 2017 together with the Balearic Islands

== Solo exhibitions (selection) ==
- 2014 Pequeños catálogo de instantes de felicidad – Barberà del Vallès
- 2014 Senzaparole – Biblioteca Delfini, Modena
- 2014 Sinpalabras – Panta Rhei, Madrid
- 2015 Sinpalabras – AnimaNaturalis, Barcelona
- 2015, Roger Olmos. Illustrator – Kinderboekenmarkt, Den Haag
- 2016 Cosimo. Open air exhibition – via dell’Indipendenza and via San Giuseppe, Bologna (CHEAP – urban art festival, in collaboration with #logosedizioni)
- 2016 Cosimo. Original artworks exhibition – Family Palace, Lucca Comics & Games, Lucca, Italy
- 2017 Amigos. Open air exhibition – via dell’Abbadia, Bologna (CHEAP – urban art festival, in collaboration with #logosedizioni)
- 2017 Cosimo – Mirabilia Art Gallery, Bologna, Italy
- 2018 Lucia. Open air exhibition – via dell’Indipendenza, Bologna (CHEAP – urban art festival, in collaboration with #logosedizioni and CBM Italia Onlus)
- 2018 Lucia – Mirabilia Art Gallery, Bologna
- 2018 Lucia – Premio letterario Giuseppe Dessì, Ex Mulino Cadoni, Villacidro
- 2019 Un poquito de media vida – LAVA, Valladolid
- 2019 Ilustrando la mala suerte – Fundación BilbaoArte, Bilbao
- 2021 Roger Olmos: Amici per la pelle. Open air exhibition – via dell’Indipendenza, Bologna (CHEAP – urban art festival)
- 2023 Cosimo. Original artworks exhibition – Biblioteca Paolo Borsellino, Como
- 2023 Roger Olmos: La forza dei forti – Modo Infoshop, Bologna

== Group exhibitions (selection) ==
- 2000 Bären – Internationale Jugendbibliothek, Munich
- 2014 Latin Beat Film Festival – T-Site Daikanyama, Tokyo, with Ana Juan and Alejandro Magallanes
- 2015 Imaginarius – Las Naves, Valencia, with Elena Odriozola and Julio Antonio Blasco
- 2017 Vidas ilustradas – València Capital Animal, Centre del Carme Cultura Contemporània, Valencia
- 2018 Los ilustrados de Ornamante – Ornamante Lab-Shop, Barcelona
- 2019 Milagros. Instituto Cervantes – Rome, with Ana Juan
- 2019 Milagros. Instituto Cervantes – Naples, with Ana Juan
- 2019 Almost Tales – Afnakafna palestra d’arte, Roma
- 2020 Tres tristes tigres – Galería Espacio 0, Huelva
- 2021 Roger Olmos: Amici per la pelle. Open air exhibition – via dell’Indipendenza, Bologna (CHEAP – urba art festival)
- 2023 Roger Olmos: La forza dei forti – Modo Infoshop, Bologna

== Bibliography ==
- 2000, Tío lobo (texts by Xosé Ballesteros), Kalandraka, Spain
- 2001, El quadre més bonic del món (texts by Miquel Obiols), Kalandraka, Spain
- 2003, En el mar de la imaginación (texts by Rafael Calatayud), Edelvives, Spain
- 2003, El libro de las fábulas, Ediciones B, Spain
- 2003, Las trenzas del abuelo (texts by Nuria Figueras), Kalandraka, Spain
- 2004, Lazarillo de Tormes (text adaptation by Luis García Martín), Edelvives, Spain
- 2005, Concierto para animales (texts by Andrés Valero Castells), Kalandraka, Spain
- 2005, La cosa que más duele en el mundo (texts by Paco Liván), OQO, Spain
- 2006, L’orquestra de la Clara (texts by Elisa Ramón), Baula, Spain
- 2006, La cabra boba (texts by Pep Bruno), OQO, Spain
- 2006, ¡Sígueme! (una historia de amor que no tiene nada de raro) (texts by José Campanari), OQO, Spain
- 2007, The Thing that Hurts Most in the World (texts by Paco Liván, translation by Mark W. Heslop), OQO, Spain
- 2007, The Silly Nanny Goat (texts by Pep Bruno, translation by Mark W. Heslop), OQO, Spain
- 2007, Cleta, un regal del mar (texts by Joan Vila i Vila), Baula, Spain
- 2007, Una pluma de cuervo blanco (texts by Pepe Maestro), Edelvives, Spain
- 2007, La capra matta (texts by Pep Bruno, translation by Anna Barella Sciolette), #logosedizioni, Italy
- 2007, La cosa che fa più male al mondo (texts by Paco Liván, translation by Fabio Regattin), #logosedizioni, Italy
- 2008, Follow me! (A Love Story that isn't Strange at All) (texts by José Campanari, translation by Mark W. Heslop), OQO, Spain
- 2008, La Múnia dorm sota la manta (texts by Juan Krutz Igerabide), Animallibres, Spain
- 2008, La llegenda de Sant Jordi (text adaptation by Josep Francesc Delgado), Baula, Spain
- 2008, El cuadro más bonito del mundo (texts by Miquel Obiols), Kalandraka, Spain
- 2008, Il quadro più bello del mondo (texts by Miquel Obiols, translation by Elena Rolla), Kalandraka, Italy
- 2008, Sherlock Holmes y el caso de la joya azul (text adaptation by Rosa Moya), Lumen, Spain
- 2008, La reina Victoria (texts by Lytton Strachey, translation by Silvia Pons Pradilla), Lumen, Spain
- 2009, El príncep dels embolics (texts by Roberto Aliaga), Baula, Spain
- 2009, El príncipe de los enredos (texts by Roberto Aliaga), Edelvives, Spain
- 2009, Chevalier Auguste Dupin y la carta robada (text adaptation by Rosa Moya), Lumen, Spain
- 2009, Las aventuras de Tom Sawyer (text adaptation by Rosa Moya), Lumen, Spain
- 2009, La cara oculta de (la llegada del hombre a) la Luna (texts by Lewis York), Lumen, Spain
- 2009, El Mosquito (texts by Margarita del Mazo), OQO, Spain
- 2010, Un camaleón en la escuela de gatos (texts by Roberto Aliaga), Edebé, Spain
- 2010, El gat de Montmartre (texts by Joseph Lluch), Estrella Polar, Spain
- 2010, Entresombras y el circo ambulante (texts by Roberto Aliaga), Macmillan Education Iberia, Spain
- 2010, Entresombras y la llave maestra (texts by Roberto Aliaga), Macmillan Education Iberia, Spain
- 2010, Un cuento lleno de lobos (texts by Roberto Aliaga), OQO, Spain
- 2010, Andrés cabeza abajo (texts by Pablo Albo), OQO, Spain
- 2010, Mosquito (texts by Margarita del Mazo, translation by Mark W. Heslop), OQO, Spain
- 2011, Superhéroes (texts by Roberto Aliaga), Anaya, Spain
- 2011, El botó de Nacre (texts by Joan de Deu Prats), Baula, Spain
- 2011, Roger Olmos. Catalogo, #logosedizioni, Italy
- 2011, Besos que fueron y no fueron (texts by David Aceituno), Lumen, Spain
- 2011, Entresombras y el viaje del fin… de curso (texts by Roberto Aliaga), Macmillan Education Iberia, Spain
- 2012, A Chameleon in Cat School (texts by Roberto Aliaga), Edebé, Spain
- 2012, Storia del bambino buono. Storia del bambino cattivo (texts by Mark Twain, translation by Valentina Vignoli), #logosedizioni, Italy
- 2012, The Story of the Good Little Boy. The Story of the Bad Little Boy (texts by Mark Twain), #logosedizioni, Italy
- 2012, Historia de un niño bueno. Historia de un niño malo (texts by Mark Twain, translation by Patricia Mayorga), #logosedizioni, Italy
- 2012, Una storia piena di lupi (texts by Roberto Aliaga, translation by Antonella Lami), #logosedizioni, Italy
- 2012, El rompecabezas (texts by Txabi and Manu Arnal Gil), OQO, Spain
- 2012, Entresombras y la cabalgata macabra (texts by Roberto Aliaga), Macmillan Education Iberia, Spain
- 2013, Diego en la Botella (texts by Mar Pavón), Edebé, Spain
- 2013, Baci che furono e che non furono (texts by David Aceituno, translation by Antonella Fabbrini), Bulgarini, Italy
- 2013, Pequeño catálogo de instantes de felicidad (texts by Lluis Llort), Lumen, Spain
- 2014, Piccolo catalogo degli istanti di felicità (texts by Lluis Llort, translation by Antonella Fabbrini), Bulgarini, Italy
- 2014, Tío lobo (texts by Xosé Ballesteros), Kalandraka, Spain
- 2014, La màquina de Pessigolles (texts by Elisenda Queralt), la Galera, Spain
- 2014, Senzaparole (translation by Valentina Vignoli), #logosedizioni, Italy
- 2014, Senzaparole portfolio, #logosedizioni, Italy
- 2014, Regálame un beso (texts by David Aceituno), Lumen, Spain
- 2015, La leyenda de Zum (texts by Txabi Arnal), Nubeocho Ediciones, Spain
- 2015, Calando, #logosedizioni, Italy
- 2015, La leggenda di Zum (texts by Txabi Arnal, translation by Valentina Vignoli), #logosedizioni, Italy
- 2015, Rompicapo (texts by Txabi and Manu Arnal Gil, translation by Valentina Vignoli), #logosedizioni, Italy
- 2015, Seguimi! (una storia d’amore che non ha niente di strano) (texts by José Campanari, translation by Fabio Regattin), #logosedizioni, Italy
- 2016, El detective Lucas Borsalino (texts by Juan Marsé), Alfaguara, Spain
- 2016, Parque muerte (texts by Fernando Lalana), Edebé, Spain
- 2016, Cosimo, #logosedizioni, Italy
- 2017, El Mosquito (texts by Margarita del Mazo), Jaguar Ediciones, Spain
- 2017, Amigos (translations by Francesca Del Moro, Federico Taibi, Valentina Vignoli), #logosedizioni, Italy
- 2017, Stop, #logosedizioni, Italy
- 2017, La Zanzara (texts by Margarita del Mazo, translation by Valentina Vignoli), #logosedizioni, Italy
- 2017, Zak! Una zebra sopra le righe (texts by Cristina Nenna), Valentina edizioni, Italy
- 2018, La vida de los monstruos (texts by David Aceituno), Astronave, Spain
- 2018, Lucia (English translation by David Haughton), #logosedizioni, Italy
- 2018, Lo struffallocero blu (texts by Ursula Wölfel, translation by Valentina Vignoli), #logosedizioni, Italy
- 2019, Chester, el oso extraterrestre (texts by Raquel Garrido), Apila Ediciones, Spain
- 2019, El libro de la mala suerte (texts by Edu Pez Bohó), Bonito Editorial, Spain
- 2019, La foca bianca (texts by Rudyard Kipling, translation by Federico Taibi), #logosedizioni, Italy
- 2019, Grindadráp (texts by Geert Vons, English translation by David Haughton), #logosedizioni, Italy
- 2019, La foca bianca. Edizione speciale (texts by Rudyard Kipling, translation by Federico Taibi), #logosedizioni, Italy
- 2020, 할수밖에없는말 (Senzaparole), Salon de l’Illustration, Korea
- 2020, El abecedario de Nico y Arturo (texts by Ana López), A fin de cuentos, Spain
- 2020, L’Isola del Tesoro (texts by Robert Louis Stevenson, translation by Alberto Frigo), #logosedizioni, Italy
- 2020, Aquarium (texts by Geert Vons, English translation by David Haughton), #logosedizioni, Italy
- 2020, Happy Meat, #logosedizioni, Italy
- 2020, Taiji (texts by Geert Vons, English translation by David Haughton), #logosedizioni, Italy
- 2021, L’Isola del Tesoro. Edizione speciale (texts by Robert Louis Stevenson, translation by Alberto Frigo), #logosedizioni, Italy
- 2021, Amici per la pelle, #logosedizioni, Italy
- 2021, Il richiamo della foresta (Italian translation of Jack London's The Call of the Wild by Mirta Cimmino), #logosedizioni, Italy
- 2022, Il canzoniere della Ciopi, #logosedizioni, Italy
- 2022, Shark! (texts by Gert Vons), #logosedizioni, Italy
- 2022, Alfabeto manuale (texts by SegniAmo Bimbi), #logosedizioni, Italy
- 2023, La forza dei forti (Italian translation of Jack London's The Strength of the Strong by Davide Sapienza), #logosedizioni, Italy
- 2023, Piccolo vocabolario, bebè e genitori (texts by SegniAmo Bimbi), #logosedizioni, Italy
- 2023, Qué solos se quedan los muertos (text by G.A. Bécquer), Editorial Deméter, Spain

== Book covers ==
- 2007, Cuentos clásicos I, VV. AA., Pirueta, Spain
- 2007, Cuentos clásicos II, VV.AA., Pirueta, Spain
- 2008, Cuentos clásicos III, VV. AA., Pirueta, Spain
- 2008, Cuentos clásicos IV, VV. AA., Pirueta, Spain
- 2008, Minotauro. La batalla del laberinto, by Gabriel García de Oro, Ediciones B, Spain
- 2009, Cuentos clásicos V, VV. AA., Pirueta, Spain
- 2009, Minotauro. La torre del tiempo, by Gabriel García de Oro, Ediciones B, Spain
- 2009, La última bruja de Trasmoz, by Cesar Fernandez García, la Galera, Spain
- 2010, Haroun i el mar de les histories, by Salman Rushdie, Edicions Bromera, Spain
- 2010, Luka i el foc de la vida, by Salman Rushdie, Edicions Bromera, Spain
- 2010, Luzazul, by Carmen Fernández Villalba, la Galera, Spain
- 2010, Cuentos clásicos VI, VV. AA., Pirueta, Spain
- 2012, Parque muerte, by Fernando Lalana, Edebé, Spain
- 2014, Cuentos clásicos de la literatura española, AA. VV., Edelvives, Spain
- 2015, El universo para Ulises, by Juan Carlos Ortega, Planeta, Spain

== CD covers ==
- 2006, Facto Delafé y las Flores Azules versus el monstruo de las Ramblas, by Facto Delafé y las Flores Azules,
- 2007, En la luz de la mañana, by Facto Delafé y las Flores Azules
- 2008, True Love, Là Par Force
- 2011, Love Battle, CatPeople
