= Six-Gun Snow White =

2013 fantasy novella by Catherynne M. Valente

- First edition
- Author: Catherynne M. Valente
- Language: English
- Genre: Fantasy; Western
- Set in: American west
- Publisher: Subterranean Press
- Publication date: February 28, 2013
- Publication place: United States
- Media type: Print (hardcover, paperback)
- Pages: 167 pp.
- OCLC: 828097718
- Dewey Decimal: 813/.6

Six-Gun Snow White is a 2013 fantasy novella by American author Catherynne M. Valente, retelling the story of Snow White in a mythical version of the American frontier, where she is born to a Crow woman and white man. It was published by Subterranean Press.

== Reception ==
Publishers Weekly considered it "witty" with "complex reverberations", and lauded "the originality of the atmosphere" and "the simple pleasure of savoring Valente’s exuberant writing". Kirkus Reviews praised Valente's "enjoyably distinctive voice", and the "fascinating details" of the setting, judging the whole as "engaging and delightfully written", but noting that the conclusion "rushes in unexpectedly".

== Awards ==
Year	Award	Category	Result	Ref.
2013	Nebula Award	Novella	Finalist	
2014	Hugo Award	Novella	Finalist	
2014	Locus Award	Novella	Won	
2014	World Fantasy Award	Novella	Finalist	
