= The Past Is Red =

2021 fantasy novella by Catherynne M. Valente

- Author: Catherynne M. Valente
- Language: English
- Genre: Fantasy; climate fiction
- Publisher: Tordotcom
- Publication date: July 20, 2021
- Publication place: United States
- Pages: 150
- ISBN: 9781250301130

The Past Is Red is a 2021 fantasy novella by Catherynne M. Valente. It includes two parts; Part I, The Future Is Blue, was previously published as a novelette, winning the Theodore Sturgeon Award in 2017. Part II is an original work entitled The Past Is Red. The entire work was nominated for the 2022 Hugo Award for Best Novella, 2022 Locus Award for Best Novella, and inaugural Ursula K. Le Guin Prize.

== Plot ==
=== The Future Is Blue ===
Nineteen-year old Tetley Abednego describes herself as the “most hated girl in Garbagetown”. She suffers physical and verbal abuse from all inhabitants of Garbagetown.

Decades before the start of the story, all dry land disappeared due to climate change. Most remaining humans live atop the Great Pacific Garbage Patch. Humans survive off the trash left by the previous civilization, whom they call the Fuckwits.

Tetley was born with a nuchal cord; her parents did not believe she would survive and neglected her in favor of her twin brother. She recounts leaving home at the age of ten to receive her name, which is a ritual common to all children of Garbagetown. After finding a tea bag stuck to her, she receives the name Tetley; her twin brother becomes Maruchan. She falls in love with a boy named Goodnight Moon, who lives in Electric City, the richest neighborhood in Garbagetown.

When Tetley is seventeen, Garbagetown is visited by Brighton Pier, which survives as a floating city. The Emperor of Brighton Pier claims to have seen dry land, but one of his subjects admits that this is a lie. Goodnight Moon tells Tetley that Electric City has been building an engine in preparation for the news that dry land still exists. It will turn Garbagetown into a massive boat, but this will use up all the fuel which would otherwise last decades. Tetley destroys the engine and thus becomes the most hated girl in Garbagetown.

=== The Past Is Red ===
Twenty-nine year old Tetley lives on a boat moored to the side of Garbagetown. She discusses life with Big Red, a girl who sneaks away from home to visit.

When Tetley was twenty-one, citizens of Garbagetown burned down her house. She is rescued and taken to marry the King of Garbagetown. On the journey, Tetley activates an artificial intelligence named Mister. Goodnight Moon meets her in the King's palace and asks her to run away with him. They get on a boat and sail to a tiny patch of dry land. Goodnight Moon tells Tetley that he is the king, and they marry. Mister manages to connect to a satellite, and they learn that other humans now live on Mars. Tetley speaks to a Martian child named Olivia. Olivia's father refuses to help the humans remaining on Earth and destroys their communication link.

Before they can return to Garbagetown, Goodnight Moon dies of a fever. Tetley orders Mister to delete all records of Mars. She debates whether or not tell anyone about the other humans, fearing that they will never enjoy life in Garbagetown if they are always looking for a way to escape. Years later, Olivia reconnects with Tetley via satellite. Tetley gives her the name Big Red.

== Publication history ==
The Future Is Blue was originally published in the 2016 anthology Drowned Worlds by Jonathan Strahan. It later became the title piece in a 2018 collection by Valente before being incorporated into The Past Is Red.

== Reception ==
Gary K. Wolfe wrote that Tetley is reminiscent of Candide, and that the setting is similar to that of Waterworld. Wolfe praised the expansion of the world of "The Future Is Blue", calling it "a rare expansion of a popular story that improves upon the original". A review in the Chicago Review of Books praised the work's exploration of the climate crisis and its critique of excessive consumption. A review in the Newton Review of Books found the novella to be a unique take on the post-apocalyptic genre, calling it "an excoriating takedown of commercialism". Writing for Tor.com, Martin Cahill called the novel "a joy to read" despite the dystopian setting, and "a gift for readers of science fiction".

Publishers Weekly praised Valente's "characteristic vivid prose" and called the work entertaining, but noted that it sometimes "raises more questions than it answers".

Work	Year	Award	Result	Ref.
"The Future Is Blue"	2017	Locus Award for Best Novelette	Finalist	
"The Future Is Blue"	2017	Theodore Sturgeon Award	Won	
The Past Is Red	2022	Hugo Award for Best Novella	Finalist	
The Past Is Red	2022	Locus Award for Best Novella	Finalist	
The Past Is Red	2022	Ursula K. Le Guin Prize	Finalist	
