= Gaia Consort =

- Origin: Seattle
- Genres: Folk rock, Psychedelic rock, Pagan rock
- Members: Christopher Bingham, Sue Tinney, Larry Golding, Sunnie Reed, T.J. Morris, Jay Kenney, Betsy Tinney, Dan Mohler
- Website: http://www.gaiaconsort.com

Gaia Consort is the original incarnation of Seattle-based folk rock music-group Bone Poets Orchestra. The group, popular in the Pacific Northwest of the United States, was founded as Gaia Consort by Christopher Bingham and Sue Tinney in 1997. Their first performance was at Nudestock 97. Gaia Consort has worked with a large number of musicians from the Pacific NorthWest, including Heather Alexander and Dan Ochipinti of the Celtic folk-rock band Uffington Horse (band).

Gaia Consort released their first album, Gaia Circles in 1999, their second album Secret Voices in 2001, their third Evolve in 2004, and their fourth Vitus Dance in 2007.

The group has focused on playing at house concerts, self-produced shows and events such as Faerieworlds and Heartland Pagan Festival, instead of more traditional musical venues. This, in addition to their songs which frequently involve themes such as neopaganism, positive sexuality and polyamory, has made Gaia Consort a favorite of the pagan and sexual subcultures of the Pacific Northwest. They enjoy a strong fan base, evidenced from the fact that all of their albums are financed by donations from the listening community. Seattle filmmaker and polyamory advocate Terisa Greenan has produced several music videos for Gaia Consort.

Gaia Consort's philosophy is somewhat unusual in the music industry: the majority of the band's music is available freely on their website, and Gaia Consort actively encourages the non-commercial sharing of these MP3-format songs, saying that 'music should not be bottled up' for the few who can afford to pay for it.

A major theme of much of Gaia Consort's work is the greater world and how it affects our lives; religion is one such target, while other songs have a decidedly 'anti-war' tone (one song asks 'What will it come to when we've finally had enough?').
