= Alexander James Adams =

American singer, musician and songwriter

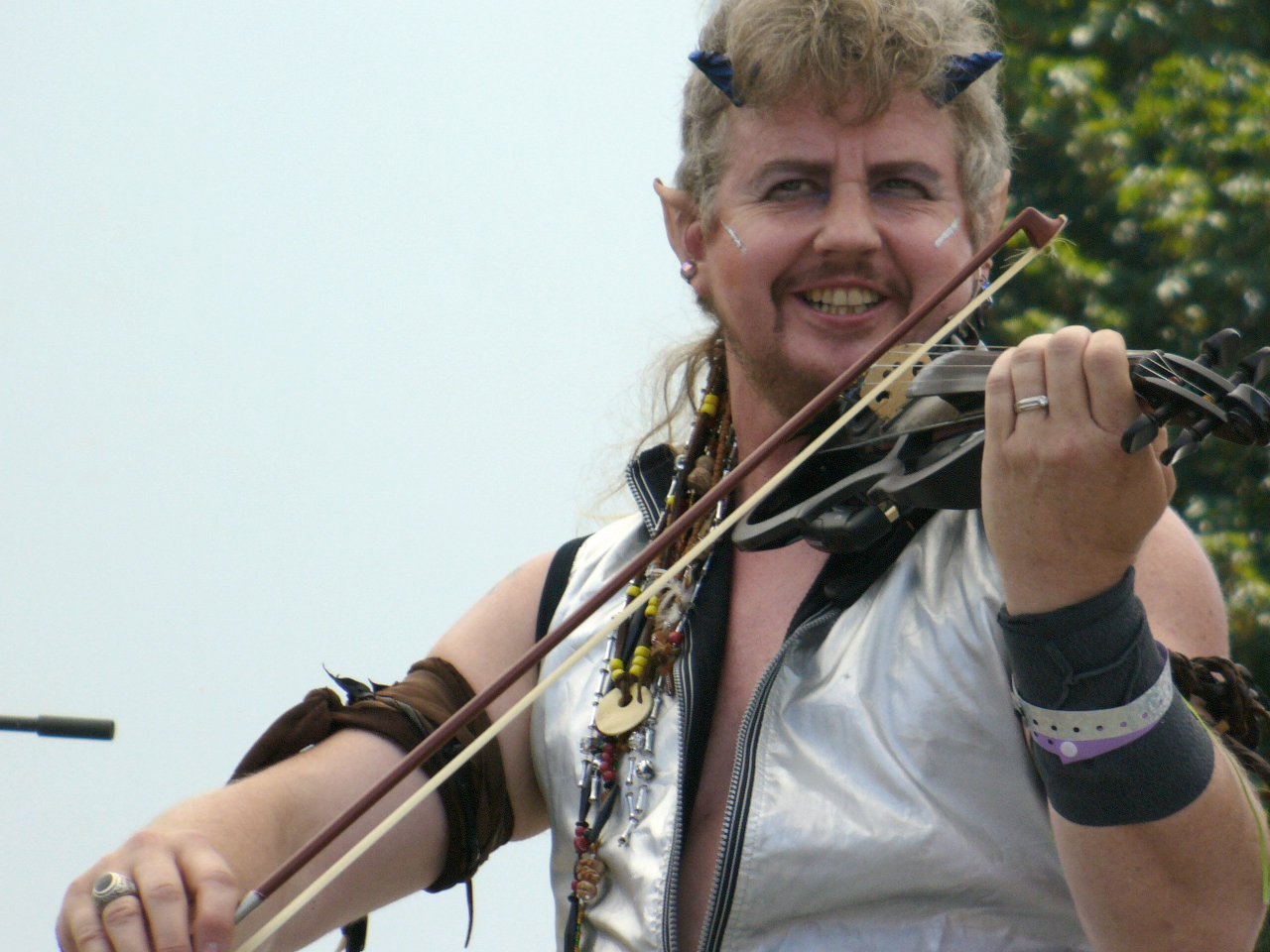
- Alexander James Adams performing with Tricky Pixie in 2009 at Faerieworlds.

Background information
- Born: November 8, 1962 (age 63)
- Genres: World, Celtic
- Instruments: Voice, violin, guitar, bodhrán
- Years active: 1985–present
- Labels: SeaFire Productions, Inc.
- Website: Official website

Alexander James Adams (formerly Heather Alexander; born November 8, 1962) is an American singer, musician and songwriter in the Celtic and world music genres who blends mythical, fantasy, and traditional themes in performances, switching between instrumental fiddle and songs accompanied by guitar, bodhrán, and fiddle-playing. Adams has also been an artist in the field of filk music and won multiple Pegasus awards.

Adams performed for 25 years before his gender transition. His website refers to him as the "heir" to Heather Alexander, and continues to credit songs originally released as Heather Alexander under that name.

== Career ==
=== 1980s–2006 ===
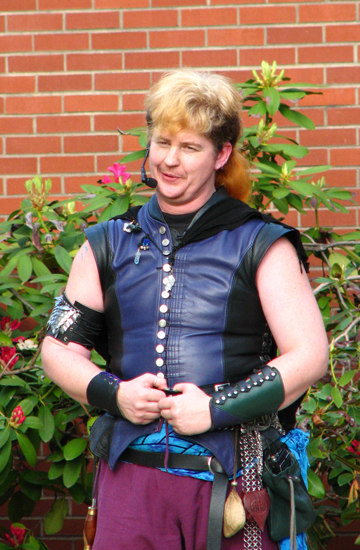
Alexander James Adams at a performance in April 2007

A native of California, Adams began performing original music in the mid-eighties for friends, Renaissance fairs, and science fiction conventions. Off Centaur Publications was recording performances at one convention and asked to include Adams. This began an association where he recorded for Off Centaur and later Firebird Arts and Music, primarily work for hire.

In the late 1980s, Adams co-founded the Celtic fusion rock band Phoenyx, which released one album, Keepers of the Flame. The band disbanded in 1991 after achieving a high degree of local fame. Their album was reprinted by Prometheus Music in 2025.

Adams returned to a solo career. Firebird Arts & Music produced a live album which did well enough to inspire Adams to create a label, Sea Fire Productions, Inc., for his album release Wanderlust. Two live concert albums and several studio albums have followed. Adams also moved to the Pacific Northwest, settling in Banks, Oregon in 2002.

In 2001, Adams founded a new band, Uffington Horse, together with Andrew Hare and Dan Ochipinti and continued to perform solo gigs between band appearances. In 2004, a limited run of the Uffington Horse promotional CD was offered to fans to help finance recording their first studio album, Enchantment, published in 2004. In 2002, he told Strange Horizons that "I tend to think of myself as a 'musical entertainer.' I sing, play, compose, and tell stories."

=== 2007–present ===
In early 2007, Adams transitioned to male and since April 2007 has performed in many of the venues that he had formerly played as Heather Alexander. He has played with Uffington Horse and has also formed a new band, Tricky Pixie, with S.J. Tucker and Betsy Tinney. In summer 2007, the band released a recording of their first concert, Live!, which is the earliest released recording of Adams' post-transition voice. The last public performance under his previous name was at OryCon 2006. His debut under his current name was at Seattle's Norwescon 30, on April 6, 2007.

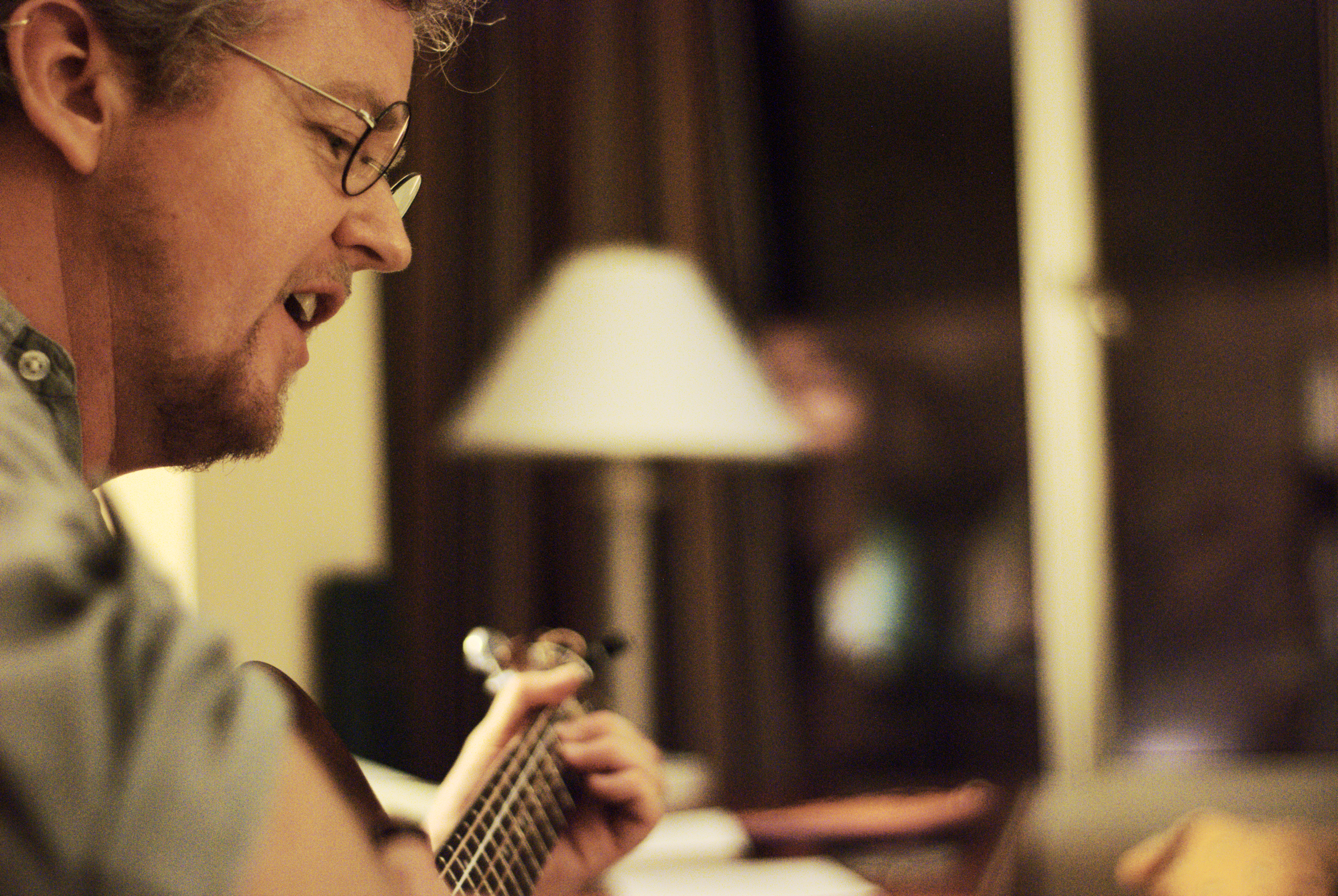
Alexander James Adams at Conflikt in January 2010

Adams' first post-transition solo album, Cat & The Fiddle, was entirely instrumental. Balance of Nature, released in fall 2007, mixed a few of his older works (such as "Creature of the Wood") with new songs.

In November 2007, Adams released the Yule album Wintertide, featuring duets between Adams' and Heather Alexander's voices. As noted in Adams' interview in Just Out, Wintertide is the first album with a series of these duets. A Familiar Promise, released in July 2008, also includes duets between the voices.

== Literary collaborations and references ==
Several of the Firebird Arts and Music albums include collaborations with Mercedes Lackey and inspired by the works of Andre Norton. (See the discography below for more information.)

The 2002 album Insh'Allah was inspired by Steven Barnes's novel Lion's Blood. The songs and the book were written concurrently, and several of the songs are quoted in the book and its sequel.

In a similar vein, the 2006 album Merlin's Descendants is based on the fiction of Irene Radford.

S.M. Stirling quotes Adams's song lyrics in his Island in the Sea of Time trilogy. His Emberverse series features a red-haired musician who plays guitar, fiddle, and bodhran named Juniper Mackenzie. Adams' song lyrics are used as Mackenzie's songs in the book. (Juniper and heather are both plants.)

John Ringo quotes Adams' song "March of Cambreadth" in his Council Wars series (for the Centurions' battle song) as well as in the Paladin of Shadows series. "March of Cambreadth" and "Black Unicorn" are also quoted in the Looking Glass series.

Mike Shepherd used the song "March of Cambreadth" in his book Defiant. Defiant also has a character named Heather Alexander.

Several of Adams' songs have been parodied, most notably "March of Cambreadth".

== Awards ==
Heather Alexander

Year	Award	Category	Nominee/Song	Result
1995	Pegasus Award	Best Performer	Heather Alexander	Nominated
1996	Pegasus Award	Best Writer/Composer	Heather Alexander	Won
1996	Pegasus Award	Best Performer	Heather Alexander	Won
1998	Pegasus Award	Best Myth Song	"Midsummer"	Nominated
1998	Pegasus Award	Best Adaptation	Demonsbane w/ Mercedes Lackey	Nominated
2006	Pegasus Award	Best Battle Song	"March of Cambreadth"	Won
2018	Pegasus Award	Best Classic Filk Song	"Creature of the Wood"	Won

Alexander James Adams

Year	Award	Category	Nominees & Recipients	Result
2011	Pegasus Award	Best Performer	Tricky Pixie	Nominated
2013	Pegasus Award	Best Performer	Alexander James Adams	Won

== Discography ==
The albums listed through Everafter are billed as Heather Alexander. Later are billed as Alexander James Adams.

=== Solo albums ===
Unless otherwise noted, albums feature a mix of traditional & original Celtic music.

- Freedom, Flight and Fantasy 1990 (Firebird Arts and Music). Lyrics: Mercedes Lackey. Music: Leslie Fish. Arrangements: Cecilia Eng.
- Heather Alexander, Live 1992 (Firebird Arts and Music). Alexander sings and plays guitar, bodhran, and fiddle.
- Songsmith, 1993 (Firebird Arts and Music). Songs based on the book Songsmith by Andre Norton and A.C. Crispin.
- Wanderlust 1994 (Sea Fire Productions, Inc.) First studio recording on Alexander's own label with backing musicians.
- Shadow Stalker 1994 (Firebird Arts and Music). Lyrics: Mercedes Lackey & D.F. Sanders. Music: Heather Alexander & Cecilia Eng. Arrangements: Heather Alexander.
- Life's Flame 1996 (Sea Fire Productions, Inc.) Second live album. Alexander sings and plays guitar, bodhran, and fiddle.
- Midsummer 1997 (Sea Fire Productions, Inc.) Second studio recording on Alexander's own label with backing musicians.
- A Gypsy's Home 2001 (Sea Fire Productions, Inc.) Third studio recording on Alexander's own label with backing musicians.
- Insh'Allah—Music of Lion's Blood 2002 (Sea Fire Productions, Inc.) Songs based in the world of Steven Barnes' book Lion's Blood. The book and album were written concurrently; Barnes quotes song lyrics in the book.
- Festival Wind 2003 (Sea Fire Productions, Inc.) Third live album. Alexander sings and plays guitar, bodhran, and fiddle.
- Album of Secrets 2003 (Sea Fire Productions, Inc.) Primarily bloopers and outtakes from the recording of Festival Wind.
- Merlin's Descendants 2006 (Sea Fire Productions, Inc.) Songs based on the Merlin's Descendants series by Irene Radford.
- Arms of the Sea 2006 (Sea Fire Productions, Inc.) Traditional and original sea shanties.
- Everafter 2007 (Sea Fire Productions, Inc.) Final Heather Alexander solo album, this is a studio recording with backing musicians. (Despite having the same name as the DVD, the album is not DVD soundtrack.)
- Cat & The Fiddle 2007 (Sea Fire Productions, Inc.) Instrumental fiddle tunes.
- Balance of Nature 2007 (Sea Fire Productions, Inc.) Mostly new songs, a few re-recorded old songs ("Creature of the Wood"), and a few songs that blend old and new (such as "He of the Sidhe").
- Wintertide 2007 (Sea Fire Productions, Inc.) Yule album featuring traditional and original songs by Heather Alexander & Alexander James Adams, featuring duets between both voices.
- A Familiar Promise 2008 (Sea Fire Productions, Inc.) Studio album featuring new and old songs.
- Harvest Season: Second Cutting 2010 (Sea Fire Productions, Inc.) Studio album featuring new and old songs.
- UnSeelie Self 2010 (Sea Fire Productions, Inc.) Studio album featuring new and old songs.
- AJA Summer Releases 2013
- The Clockwork Collection 2014

=== Band albums ===
- Keepers of the Flame, Phoenyx 1990 (Phoenyx and Sea Fire Productions, Inc.) Issued by the band in 1990. Reprinted 2025 by Prometheus Music.
- Uffington Horse Promotional Album, Uffington Horse, 2004 (Sea Fire Productions, Inc.) Created for promotional purposes; a limited run was offered to fans in 2004.
- Enchantment, Uffington Horse 2004 (Sea Fire Productions, Inc.) Uffington's studio album.
- Live!, Tricky Pixie 2007. Contains songs written and performed by Alexander James Adams, S.J. Tucker and Betsy Tinney. No longer in print.
- Mythcreants, Tricky Pixie 2009. Contains songs written and performed by Alexander James Adams, S.J. Tucker and Betsy Tinney.

=== DVD ===
- Everafter February 2007 (Sea Fire Productions, Inc.) Recording of Heather Alexander's final public concert in November 2006 at Orycon. Alexander sang and played guitar, bodhran, and fiddle. Bonus materials include a few performances at a pub and an interview.
- Yule Concert December 2009 (Sea Fire Productions, Inc.) Recording of Alexander James Adams's December 2009 concert at the Lucky Lab Pub.
- Ember Days Original Motion Picture Soundtrack (Pixiehouse Productions)

=== Books ===
- Everafter booklet February 2007. A short faerie tale.
- The Heather Alexander Songbook was published in late 2007. It includes lyrics and music for the Sea Fire Productions albums from Wanderlust through Everafter.

=== Guest appearances ===
This includes compilations and backing appearances for other artists.

- Southwind: Traditional Celtic Music by Glenn Morgan, 1987. Played fiddle on most of the tracks.
- Firestorm: Songs of the Third World War, Leslie Fish, 1989. Sings on the track "Better than Who".
- Gaia Circles, Gaia Consort, 2000. Played fiddle on most of the tracks.
- Roundworm, various artists, 2000. (Song parodies by Bob Kanefsky.) Sings "December of Cambreadth", a parody of "March of Cambreadth", and "Something's Under The Bed", a parody of "Up In The Loft".
- The Constellation, Hank Cramer, 2003.
- Thirteen, Vixy & Tony, 2008. Played fiddle and percussion on the track "Apprentice".
- Come Find Me, Fox Amoore, 2014. Appeared on the track "Kellashee".

== See also ==
- "Faerie Queen" (song)
- "The Stolen Child"
