= Faerieworlds =

Music and arts festival that is held annually in Oregon

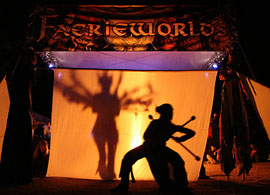

Faerieworlds was an annual music and arts festival currently held annually in the U.S. state of Oregon. The festival's primary theme was the "realm of the faerie". As of 2015, the festival moved to Hornings Hideout near Portland after many recent festivals had been held at Mount Pisgah in the Howard Buford Park Recreation Area southeast of Eugene, Oregon. The 2015-2019 festivals were held at Horning's Hideout and 2020 saw a virtual event take place on the live stream platform PORTL. The 2021 date was cancelled due to the ongoing pandemic, and in 2022 resumed, taking place at the Cuthbert Theater in Eugene, Oregon. In 2023, all future events were cancelled and their LLC was legally dissolved due to under-performance and financial issues as a result of the COVID-19 pandemic.

== Events ==
Faerieworlds was started by Emilio and Kelly Miller-Lopez of the musical group Woodland, and Robert Gould of the transmedia arts company Imaginosis. The festival features artists, authors, musicians and crafters whose work is connected to or inspired by folklore, specifically faerie lore.

== Locations ==
Faerieworlds Festivals have now taken place in Sedona and Prescott, Arizona, Santa Fe, New Mexico, Los Angeles, California, North Plains, Oregon, and from 2005 to 2008 at Secret House Winery in Veneta, Oregon. Faerieworlds 2009 was moved to Mount Pisgah to accommodate a larger number of daily attendees and to allow onsite camping to thousands of guests, and it was held there from 2010 to 2014. In 2014, the Lane County Board of Commissioners voted to not allow Faerieworlds, and another event, to use the Buford Park location in 2015. The result of this was a return of the festival to Hornings Hideout, an outdoor festival venue just west of Portland Oregon.

== Performers and artists ==
The festival main stage has included such acts as Donovan, Lindsey Stirling, Omnia, Wardruna, Faun, Rasputina, Solas, The Harp twins, Woodland, Kíla, Johnny Cunningham, Susan McKeown, John Renbourn, Karan Casey, Gaia Consort, Frenchy and the Punk, Sharon Knight, Priscilla Hernandez and Qntal.

Artists and authors featured at Faerieworlds have included Brian Froud, Tony DiTerlizzi, Michael Hague, Wendy Froud, Jen Delyth, Terri Windling, Charles Vess, Charles De Lint and Amy Brown.

== FaerieCon ==
The creators of Faerieworlds also produce an event on the east coast called FaerieCon International, which first took place on the weekend of October 10–12, 2007–2008 in Philadelphia at the Pennsylvania Convention Center. FaerieCon moved to Baltimore in 2009 and took place at the Baltimore Marriott Hunt Valley Inn in 2009–2018, and the Sheraton Baltimore Waterfront Hotel in 2019. The 2020 event was canceled due to the ongoing pandemic. In February 2012 and 2013 FaerieCon West was held at the Renaissance Hotel in Seattle. FaerieCon West eventually was renamed Mythicworlds: Convention and Masquerades, which took place annually at the Seatac Doubletree Hilton in 2017 and 2018.
