= Palimpsest (novel) =

2009 novel by Catherynne M. Valente

- Cover of the first edition of Palimpsest
- Author: Catherynne M. Valente
- Language: English
- Genre: Fiction
- Publisher: Bantam Spectra
- Publication date: March 2009
- Publication place: United States
- Media type: Print (paperback)
- Pages: 367 pp
- ISBN: 9780553385762 (pbk.)
- OCLC: 232129602
- Dewey Decimal: 813/.6 22
- LC Class: PS3622.A4258 P36 2009

Palimpsest is a novel by Catherynne M. Valente, published in March 2009. It follows four separate characters as they discover and explore a mysterious city accessed only at night.

== Summary ==
The novel follows four travelers: Oleg, a New York City locksmith; November, a beekeeper; Ludovico, a binder of rare books; and Sei, a train ticket-taker. They have all lost something important in their life: a wife, lover, sister, or direction. They find themselves in Palimpsest after each sleeps with someone who has a tattooed map of a section of the city on their body. They each discover aspects of the otherworldly city. All of them yearn to live there permanently. In order to do so, they must find each other in the real world and reunite.

During the course of the novel, November recalls a favorite book of hers as a child. This book, which is only mentioned briefly in Palimpsest, was turned into a full-length novel in 2009. Valente wrote The Girl Who Circumnavigated Fairyland in a Ship of Her Own Making as a crowdfunded project; in October 2009, she announced that it, as well as a sequel, had been picked up by Feiwel & Friends, an imprint of Macmillan Publishers.

== Reception ==
Year	Award	Category	Result	Ref.
2010	Hugo Award	Novel	Finalist	
2010	Lambda Literary Award	Science Fiction, Fantasy, and Horror	Won	
2010	Locus Award	Fantasy Novel	Finalist	
2010	Mythopoeic Award	Adult Literature	Finalist	
