= Ana Juan =

Spanish artist, illustrator and painter (born 1961)

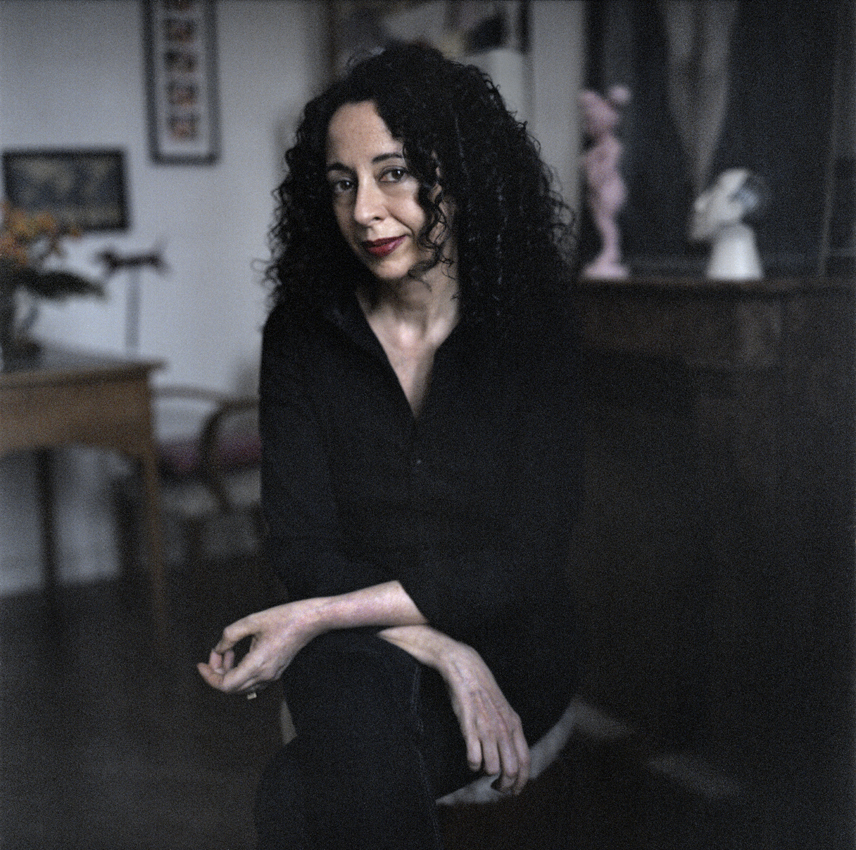
- Juan in a Photo by Laura Martínez Lombardía
- Born: 1961 (age 64–65); Valencia, Spain
- Occupations: Artist, painter, illustrator, sculptor
- Website: https://anajuan.net/

Ana Juan (born 1961) is a Spanish artist, illustrator and painter.

== Life and career ==
After graduating in fine arts from Universidad Politécnica in Valencia (1982), she moved to Madrid at the height of the movida madrileña and in the early 1980s she collaborated with magazines such as La Luna and Madriz (where "for the first seven months of the magazine's life, [she] was the only regular female artist" and for which "she authored seventeen comic book works" and illustrated many scripts for other artists).

In 1991, she temporarily moved to Paris and exhibited in Geneva and New York. In 1994, she received a fellowship by the Japanese publishing house Kodansha and lived in Japan for three months.

Back in Madrid in 1995, she started contributing to The New Yorker, for which she has designed more than 20 covers over the years, among which "Solidarité", after the Charlie Hébdo shooting in Paris.

In 1998 and 1999, she was awarded the Gold Medal (category: Illustration) by the Society of Newspaper Design and on September 24, 2010, she was awarded the “Premio Nacional de Ilustración” by the Spanish Ministry of Culture.

She currently creates her own books (texts and illustrations), exhibits her work all over the world (Spain, Mexico, Japan, Italy...) and contributes to many Spanish and international magazines. She has also illustrated many Isabel Allende’s book covers for Plaza e Janés (Penguin Random House), including Retrato en Sepia, Eva Luna, El cuaderno de Maya, Of Love and Shadows. She is one of the very few artists who was allowed by the author himself to illustrate a book by Stephen King, namely The Man in the Black Suit (El hombre del traje negro, Nórdica Libros, 2017).

== Exhibitions ==
=== Solo exhibitions ===
- 1988 Galerie Notuno, Geneve
- 1989 Galería Mama Graf, Seville
- 1992 "Graphic works", Galería del Progreso, Madrid
- 1992 121 Greene Street Gallery, New York
- 1993 "Graphic works", Galería Viciana, Valencia
- 1993 "Graphic works", Galería Bubión, Granada
- 1993 "Graphic works", Galería Jordi Barnadas, Barcelona
- 1993 Galería del Progreso, Madrid
- 1994 121 Greene Street Gallery, New York
- 1994 Art Miami, 121 Greene Street Gallery, New York
- 1997 Galería Taller Mayor 28, Madrid
- 1997 Galería Tiempos Modernos, Madrid
- 1998 "Sculpture", Galería Tiempos Modernos, Madrid
- 1999 Bellreguard, Casa de Cultura, Valencia
- 1999 Galería Sen, Madrid
- 2000 Artexpo 2000, Galería María José Castellví, Barcelona
- 2005 "Cor i Foscor", Casal Solleric, Palma de Mallorca
- 2011 "Snowhite's Secret Box", Museo ABC, Madrid
- 2012 "Snowhite's Secret Box", Pinacoteca di Bologna
- 2014 "Ana Juan. Posters 2002–2014", La factoría de papel, Madrid
- 2014 "Amantes", "Carmilla", "Frida" and "Snowhite", Museo de la ciudad, Querétaro
- 2017 "Dibujando al otro lado", Museo ABC, Madrid 16.03.17–18.06.17
- 2017 "El hombre del traje negro", exhibition of the original works, Panta Rhei, Madrid
- 2019 "Anna dei miracoli", open-air exhibition by #logosedizioni & CHEAP, via Indipendenza and via San Giuseppe, Bologna
- 2023 “Ana Juan. La grande battaglia”, Complesso San Paolo, Modena, on the occasion of DIG Festival

=== Group exhibitions ===
- 1991 "Arco 91", Ediciones Dos Negritos, Madrid
- 1992 "Collage", Galería del Progreso, Madrid
- 1993 "El canto de la tripulación", Galería Detursa, Madrid
- 1993 "X Anniversary", Galería Viciana, Valencia
- 1993 "Bestiario", Galería del Progreso, Madrid
- 1994 "El muro de Woodstock", Woodstock94, Woodstock
- 1995 "Falsos originales", Galería Maeght, Barcelona
- 1995 "L’Homme sans tête", Galerie Michel Lagarde, Paris
- 1995 "El objeto del arte", Fundación Juan March, Cuenca
- 1999 "Tango", Galerie Contours, Hamburg
- 2001 "Arco 2001", Galería Sen, Madrid
- 2001 "Los cuatro sentidos", Galería Maria José Castellví, Barcelona
- 2001 "La elegancia del espíritu", Galería María José Castellví, Barcelona
- 2001 "Mi mejor amigo", Galería Sen, Madrid
- 2001 "Tipos ilustrados", Cromotex, Madrid
- 2012 "Les couvertures du New Yorker", Galerie Martel, Paris
- 2014 Latin Beat Film Festival, T-Site Daikanyama, Tokyo, with Roger Olmos and Alejandro Magallanes
- 2016 "Sobras de arte", La factoría de papel, Madrid
- 2017 "Sobras de arte", La factoría de papel, Madrid
- 2017 "El tercer año", La factoría de papel, Madrid
- 2017 "Fanzination. Los fanzines de cómic en España", Institut Valencià d'Art Modern (IVAM), Valencia
- 2017 "Los siete pecados capitales", Espai Refugi @ Galería Shiras, Valencia
- 2017–18 "Pasa página. Una invitación a la lectura", Museo Biblioteca Nacional de España, Madrid
- 2018 "Under the Influence: The Private Collection of Peter de Sève”, Society of Illustrators, New York
- 2019 “Milagros”, Instituto Cervantes, Roma (with Roger Olmos)
- 2019 “Milagros”, Instituto Cervantes, Naples (with Roger Olmos)
- 2020 "The Turn of the Screw", online exhibition
- 2020 "Bestiario para después de…", La factoría de papel, Madrid

== Prizes and awards ==
- 1984: Best cover of the year, Saló del Còmic de Barcelona, Spain, Revista MADRIZ nº 3
- 1988: Trofeo Laus 88 for Best Advertising Illustration, Spain, Paga tú
- 1994: Kodansha Publishing scholarship, Japan
- 1995, 1996, 1997 and 1998: Silver Medal by the Society of Newspaper Design, category: Illustration
- 1996, 1997 and 1998: Gold Medal by the Society of Newspaper Design, category: Illustration
- 1996, 1997 and 1998: Excellence Award, Society of Newspaper Design, USA, Art and Illustration portfolio / Two or more colors
- 2001: “Best illustrated book” by the Conselleria de Cultura Educació i Ciència de la Generalitat Valenciana for Snowhite, Edicions de Ponent
- 2005: The Ezra Jack Keats for The Night Eater, Arthur Levine Books, USA
- 2005: Comston Book Award, Minnesota State University, USA
- 2006: Lupine Award, Picture Book Winner (category: illustrator), Maine, USA
- 2007: Junceda Iberia Prize, APIC – Asociación de Ilustradores de Cataluña, for For you are a Kenyan Child, Simon & Schuster, Spain
- 2007-2008: Prize for the best book published in the Valencian Community, category: best book published in Castilian Spanish, Demeter, Edicions de Ponent
- 2009: Mention for the Premio CCEI de Ilustración, Bibi y las bailarinas, Alfaguara
- 2010: National Illustration Award, Spanish Ministry of Culture, Spain
- 2012: San Carlos Medal, Facultad de BBAA, Valencia, Spain
- 2017: Golden Award of the ADCV, in the category "new media: installations” for the interactive exhibition “Ana Juan. Dibujando al otro lado” (in collaboration with the Politécnico de Valencia)
- 2017: Golden Award of the ADCV, in the category "new media: gaming” for the project “Earthland, Snowhite’s Mystery Tale” (simultaneous to the exhibition “Ana Juan. Dibujando al otro lado”, in collaboration with the Politécnico de Valencia)
- 2020: Premio Gràffica

== Books ==
- 2001, Amantes, 1000 editions, Spain
- 2001, Snowhite, Edicions de Ponent, Spain
- 2002, Frida (texts by Jonah Winter), Arthur Levine Books, USA
- 2004, Elena's Serenade (texts by Campbell Geeslin), Simon & Schuster, USA
- 2004, The Night Eater, Arthur Levine Books, USA
- 2006, For You Are a Kenyan Child (texts by Kelly Cunnane), Simon & Schuster, USA
- 2007, Demeter (texts by Bram Stoker), Edicions de Ponent, Spain
- 2007, The Jewel Box Ballerinas (texts by Monique de Varennes), Schwartz & Wade Books, Random House, USA
- 2008, Bibi y las bailarinas (texts by Monique de Varennes), Alfaguara, Spain
- 2008, The Elephant Wish (texts by Lou Berger), Schwartz & Wade Books, Random House, New York, USA
- 2008, Cuentos esenciales (texts by Guy de Maupassant, translation by José Ramón Monreal), Literatura Random House, Spain
- 2010, Amantes (translation by Fabio Regattin), #logosedizioni, Italy
- 2010, Circus, #logosedizioni, Italy
- 2010, L’isola (texts by Matz Mainka, translation by Antonella Lami), #logosedizioni, Italy
- 2011, The Girl Who Circumnavigated Fairyland in a Ship of Her Own Making (texts by Catheryne M. Valente), Feiwel & Friends, USA
- 2011, The Pet Shop Revolution, Arthur Levine Books, USA
- 2011, Snowhite (translation by Antonella Lami and Bill Dodd), #logosedizioni, Italy
- 2011, Sorelle (texts by Matz Mainka, translation by Antonella Lami), #logosedizioni, Italy
- 2011, Cartoline Ana Juan, #logosedizioni, Italy
- 2011, Wakefield (texts by Nathaniel Hawthorne, translation by María José Chuliá), Nørdica Libros, Spain
- 2012, Promesse (texts by Matz Mainka), #logosedizioni, Italy
- 2012, Demeter (texts by Bram Stoker, translation by Antonella Lami), #logosedizioni, Italy
- 2012, The Girl Who Fell Beneath Fairyland and Led the Revels There (texts by Catheryne M. Valente), Feiwel & Friends, USA
- 2013, The Girl Who Soared Over Fairyland and Cut the Moon in Two (texts by Catheryne M. Valente), Feiwel & Friends, USA
- 2013, Carmilla (texts by Sheridan Le Fanu, translation by Juan Elías Tovar Cross), Fondo de cultura económica, Mexico
- 2013, Otra vuelta de tuerca (texts by Henry James, translation by José Bianco), Galaxia Gutenberg, Spain
- 2014, Mi querida Babel (music and texts by Juan Pablo Silvestre, concept by Oscar Mariné), La mano cornutta, Spain
- 2014, Ana Juan. Catalogo, #logosedizioni, Italy
- 2015, Carmilla (texts by Sheridan Le Fanu, translation by Francesca Del Moro), #logosedizioni, Italia
- 2015, Lacrimosa (texts by Matz Mainka), #logosedizioni, Italy
- 2015, The Boy Who Lost Fairyland (texts by Catheryne M. Valente), Feiwel & Friends, USA
- 2016, Hermanas (texts by Matz Mainka), Edelvives, Spain
- 2016, Frida (texts by Jonah Winter, translation by Fabio Regattin), #logosedizioni, Italy
- 2017, El hombre del traje negro (texts by Stephen King, translation by Íñigo Jáuregui), Nørdica Libros, Spain
- 2018, Pelea como una chica (texts by Sandra Sabates), Editorial Planeta, Spain
- 2019, Anna dei miracoli (translation by Valentina Vignoli), #logosedizioni (in collaboration with CBM Italia), Italy
- 2019, Un milagro para Helen, Libros del zorro rojo, Spain
- 2019, Otra vuelta de tuerca (texts by Henry James, translation by José Bianco), Lunwerg, Spain
- 2020, La vida secreta de los gatos (texts by Marta Sanz), Lunwerg, Spain
- 2020, L’uomo vestito di nero (texts by Stephen King, translation by Silvia Fornasiero), Sperling & Kupfer, Italy
- 2020, Ortigas a manos llenas (texts by Sara Mesa), librerías de La Conspiración de la Pólvora, Editorial La uÑa RoTa, Editorial Delirio, La Moderna editora, Spain
- 2020, Revolución en la tienda de animales, Baobab, Planeta, Spain
- 2021, La vita segreta dei gatti (texts by Marta Sanz, translation by Federico Taibi), #logosedizioni, Italia

== Book covers ==
- 2006, La casa de los espíritus, by Isabel Allende, Debolsillo, España
- 2006, Retrato en sepia, by Isabel Allende, Debolsillo, España
- 2006, Mi país inventado, by Isabel Allende, Debolsillo, España
- 2011, Inés del alma mía, by Isabel Allende, Random House Mondadori, España
- 2011, El cuaderno de Maya, by Isabel Allende, Random House Mondadori, España
- 2011, La suma de los días, by Isabel Allende, Plaza & Janes Editores, España
- 2011, Hija de la fortuna, by Isabel Allende, Random House Mondadori, España
- 2011, La isla bajo el mar, by Isabel Allende, Random House Mondadori, España
- 2011, Il quaderno di Maya, by Isabel Allende, Feltrinelli, Italia
- 2012, Amor, by Isabel Allende, Plaza & Janes Editores, España
- 2012, Cuentos de Eva Luna, by Isabel Allende, Plaza & Janes Editores, España
- 2013, Ritratto in seppia, by Isabel Allende, Feltrinelli, Italia
- 2013, Il mio paese inventato, by Isabel Allende, Feltrinelli, Italia
- 2013, Inés dell’anima mia, by Isabel Allende, Feltrinelli, Italia
- 2014, La città delle bestie, by Isabel Allende, Feltrinelli, Italia
- 2014, Paula, by Isabel Allende, Feltrinelli, Italia
- 2015, Paula / La suma de los días, by Isabel Allende, Debolsillo, España
- 2015, La somma dei giorni, by Isabel Allende, Feltrinelli, Italia
- 2015, Il regno del drago d’oro, by Isabel Allende, Feltrinelli, Italia
- 2015, L’isola sotto il mare, by Isabel Allende, Feltrinelli, Italia
- 2017, Paula, by Isabel Allende, Debolsillo, España
- 2018, Eva Luna, by Isabel Allende, Debolsillo, España
- 2019, El plan infinito, by Isabel Allende, Debolsillo, España
- 2020, El libro de los anhelos, by Sue Monk Kidd, Ediciones B, España
- 2020, De amor y de sombra, by Isabel Allende, Plaza & Janes Editores, España

== Covers for The New Yorker ==
- 13 July 1998, New Yorker July 13th, 1998
- 2 August 1999, City in Mourning
- 31 July 2000, A Star is Born
- 2 October 2000, Page-turner
- 4 March 2002, Let the Fur Fly
- 16 September 2002, Dawn Over Lower Manhattan
- 14 April 2003, Action
- 2 February 2004, Huddling for Warmth
- 10 May 2004, Open Wound
- 27 September 2004, Brought to Heel
- 13 & 20 June 2005, Début on the Beach
- 12 September 2005, Requiem
- 3 March 2008, Fading
- 10 March 2008, Blossoms
- 1 September 2008, Object of Desire
- 8 February 2010, Baby, it’s Cold Outside
- 29 March 2010, Homage
- 12 September 2011, Reflections
- 25 March 2013, Art and Architecture
- 27 May 2013, Defiance
- 24 March 2014, Metamorphosis
- 19 January 2015, Solidarité
- 19 & 26 December 2016, Yule Dog
- 8 October 2018, Unheard

== More ==
- 2002, Film poster for A Snake of June, by Kayju Teather and Shinya Tsukamoto, Japan
- 2002, Cover Venti4 Magazine Imperi dei sensi
- 2006, Poster for Latin Beat Film Festival
- 2006, Poster for Feria del Libro de Madrid
- 2007, Poster for Latin Beat Film Festival
- 2008, Poster for Latin Beat Film Festival
- 2010, Poster for Latin Beat Film Festival
- 2011, Poster for the Campaña fomento de la lectura, Fundació Bromera
- 2012, Poster for Cirque Jules Verne, Saison Équestre 2012–13
- 2012, Isabel Allende slipcase, Random House Mondadori
- 2013, Manifesto Latin Beat Film Festival
- 2020, Tarot Cats, Fournier
- 2020, Poster for the XXIX Festival Internacional en el Camino de Santiago
