= Council of Magickal Arts =

Spirit Haven (previously the Council of Magickal Arts) is a Pagan, 501(c)3 multicultural organization committed to fostering spirituality. The organization provides a haven for community and celebration to support and promote the well-being of its diverse membership.

== History ==
Council of the Mystic Arts

- "In the Spring of 1980, I made contact outside of my coven with several people prominent in the Craft whom I had been hearing about, putting together faces and names. We saw the need for a working network/council through which anyone who needed special help could send an SOS. We got together at Samhain 1980 for a meeting and ritual to form the council. It was named 'The Council of the Mystic Arts' in order to assure our friends and connections with Christian and Buddhist leanings that they were welcome to be a part of the network." - Bertie Estes (1997), first Director of CMA

Council of Magickal Arts

- At the May 5, 1981 Beltane meeting there were representatives from nine covens present. At the end of the first year, Bertie Estes from San Antonio, who was the first Director/Editor [of the Accord], passed on the job to me. When I took over the responsibility of Director/Editor, there was $28.90 in the Treasury and probably 20-25 members. We changed the name from the Council of the Mystic Arts to the Council of the Magickal Arts at Samhain 1981 because the membership at that time felt "Magickal" more adequately described what we were all about. By October 1983, we had 18 individual and/or group memberships with over $200 in the Treasury. - Judy Carusone (1992), Director 1981-83, Editor 1981-1990
- Beltane 1991: Festival held at the Recreation Plantation in Dripping Springs.
- November 18, 1993: The Council of Magickal arts officially becomes a incorporated.
- Samhain 1995: Festivals expand, now beginning on Thursdays, with a schedule of workshops and rituals.
- Samhain 1997: The Land Fund kicks off, raising funds through auctions, merchandise sales, and member outreach.
- June 26, 2014: Spirit Haven Ranch paid in full.
- Samhain 2022: Name changed to Spirit Haven, Inc.

Cover of The Accord, Summer 2002

== The Accord ==
The organizational newsletter was renamed The Accord in Winter 1991. The Accord was the quarterly periodical of the corporation, and contains a wide range of articles by members. In the past The Accord was a medium quality magazine periodical with national distribution, but printing costs and the expenses of land ownership have caused CMA to move to a paperless, online publication

== Festivals ==
Spirit Haven hosts a Beltane and Samhain Festival every year. Beltane is generally held on the 3rd full weekend of April, and Samhain is generally held on the 3rd full weekend of October. This allows for members of Spirit Haven to celebrate the solar holidays in their own personal ways and to not compete with other pagan festivals and events that are of interest to their membership. Spirit Haven, Inc is known for their Beltane and Samhain Festivals.

For many years the festivals were held at a commercial camping property in the hill country of Austin, Texas. In 1999 CMA purchased land of their own located near the community of Cistern in Central Texas.

A typical festival starts with setup on Wednesday for vendors and early arrivals. The main attendees arrive on Thursday, Friday, and Saturday. Each night a public main ritual is held, presented by different volunteer members and their groups (covens, kindreds, groves, etc.), and, weather permitting, a bonfire (Revel) is lit. The bonfire serves as the main public area for those who wish to stay up late into the night, drumming, dancing, and talking. Personal and group campsites also host gatherings at night.

During the daylight hours of Friday and Saturday, a full schedule of workshops are presented, some by members and some by guest presenters which, in the past, has included such notables as Diana L. Paxson, Patricia Telesco, Fritz Jung and Wren (of The Witches' Voice), Morning Glory Zell-Ravenheart, and more.

Along with the workshops and the evening rituals and bonfire, the main stage is used to present regional and national Pagan artists, such as; Wendy Rule, Ginger Doss, Dreamtrybe (formerly Velvet Hammer), Canvas, Spoonfed Tribe, SONA, Lisa Thiel, Darwin Davis, Spiral Dance and others.

The corporation's business meeting, called Great Works, is held on Sunday after the festival.

== Spirit Haven Ranch ==
Often referred to as, simply, "The Land", Spirit Haven Ranch is 101 acres (0.41 km^{2}) located in Flatonia, Texas. While improvements have been made, such as a water well and electricity, the land is mostly rough. The camping areas are wooded with native trees.

Maintenance between festivals, and the majority of the work to ready the land for each festival, is done by the volunteers of the Spirit Haven Ranch Team, and all members are welcome to come out on the Workend as part of the team, as well as interested persons wanting to learn more about Spirit Haven, Inc.

Tent camping is the primary form of lodging available at Spirit Haven Ranch. RV space is limited and with limited amenities depending on your RV's requirements. Members may steward campsites on a yearly basis, ensuring their group's placement during Festivals. These sites are reserved for the campsite steward and members they invite to camp with them.
