= PODSnet =

Pagan/Occult Distribution System (PODSnet)
- Logo of PODSnet

Total population
- c. ~10,000

Founder
- Brad Hicks, Paul Seymour, Jay and Elaine Loveless, Chuck and Pat Haynes

Regions with significant populations
- United States: unknown
- Canada: unknown
- United Kingdom: unknown
- Australia: unknown

Religions
- Ceremonial magic, Modern Paganism, Neo-druidism, Wicca

Scriptures
- N/A

Languages
- English

Pagan Occult Distribution System Network (PODSnet) was a neopagan/occult computer network of Pagan sysops operating on an international basis. PODSnet grew rapidly, and at its height, was the largest privately distributed network of Pagans, Occultists, and other people of an esoteric bent on this planet.

== Origins ==
PODSnet grew out of an Echomail area/public forum (Echo) named MAGICK on FidoNet, which was created by J. Brad Hicks, the Sysop of the Weirdbase BBS back in 1985. MAGICK was the 8th Echo conference created on FidoNet. These three were bundled as the "Magicknet Trio". If a BBS carried one, they had to carry all three. At its height, there were over 50 "official" echoes that were considered part of the PODSNet backbone, with several others available.

== See also ==
- AI mysticism
  - AI as a deity
- Discordianism
- Hyper-real religion
- Relationship between science and religion
- Technopaganism
- The Wiccan Web
- Virtual religion
