= Pagan's Night Out =

Pagan social get-together

Pagan's Night Out, or PNO, is a regularly scheduled social get-together, usually monthly, held in hundreds of Pagan and Neopagan communities around the world. It began in Houston, Texas, in 1992 as a way for users of the Brewers' Witch BBS to meet face to face, Pagan's Night Out has become a worldwide phenomena. Held in bars, pubs, coffee shops, cafes, restaurants and meeting halls, PNO is a social event for Wiccans, Asatruar, Thelemites, Druids, Setians and the hundreds of other Neopagan sects and sub-divisions.

== Origins ==
=== The Brewers' Witch BBS ===
The Brewers' Witch Bulletin Board System was started in May 1992, running on an IBM PC compatible using the Waffle BBS software and a single phone line. It was one of three Pagan-oriented BBSs in Houston at that time and, thanks to its Usenet newsgroups and email, quickly became a favorite haunt of the online Neopagans there. Later expanding to 5 phone lines and an ISDN feed running on a FreeBSD UNIX system, the BBS eventually spawned a webpage and, as the BBS era came to a close, moved totally onto the newly emerging Internet. In its time the website garnered numerous 'Net awards including Pagan Best of the Web, and the BBS was featured in Boardwatch magazine. Although the dialup BBS ceased operations in 1998, and the website saw the end of its heyday by 2000, the website still exists in a mostly static form. At their Beltaine celebration in 2005, Donal, the BBS's SysAdmin, received the first Lifetime Achievement Award from the Council of Magickal Arts for his work on The Brewers' Witch BBS and Pagan's Night Out, as well as his work creating the Usenet newsgroup, soc.religion.paganism. Donal was the author of the newsgroup RFD and charter, and husbanded the newsgroup through its creation.

Donal had quickly realized that many tensions existed between the members of various traditions that were using his BBS and, influenced by a regular weekly party held by a chat board he was familiar with, decided to get his users together for a casual social outing to try to get them to view each other as friends first and practitioners of widely differing faiths second. The announcement on his BBS regarding Pagan's Night Out, made a few weeks before the suggested date, said everyone should "leave the Bolines and starched robes at home", meaning there was to be no discussion of inter-tradition politics.

=== First PNO ===
The first PNO was held on August 25, 1992 in Houston, Texas, with barely more than a dozen in attendance. By the next year monthly attendance was closer to 50 with occasional special PNO's (such as Yule and Samhain celebrations) exceeding 120.

== History ==
A PNO was started in the Washington, DC, area in 1998 when a resident from Houston moved to the nation's capital and wanted to offer a similar program for Pagans in the area. Originally sponsored by the now defunct Mystic District Planning Coalition, the DC area PNO is currently sponsored by The Open Hearth Foundation. The DC-PNO originally met on the 13th of each month and rotated locations among DC, Northern Virginia, and suburban Maryland. It now meets on the third Friday of the month.

Today there are PNOs all over the world and in every major city in the United States, even one that meets on a U.S. aircraft carrier. The U.S. military has been instrumental in this spread and most non-U.S. PNOs are found on or near military bases.

== Impact ==
Even through the internet age, PNO's were one of the only places people could come out of the 'broom closet' and talk with other Pagans and Neopagans. For those that aren't associated with other circles or covens, this was a very helpful place for the solitary practitioner to meet others in their area face to face. Pagan's Night Out began social networking with unaffiliated Pagans which would allow others to share ideas, discuss activities and even hold open rituals. It is perhaps the widely most used medium for in-person networking in the Pagan social scene.

== Trivia ==
- Pagan Night Out is a song by Loke E. Coyote's Wiccabilly Circus. This song can be found on the MeGaPaGaTeXaPaLooZa CD which was recorded in April 2001 with songs from both SONA and Trickster on it.
- The band at the first two PNO's was the Celtic folk duo Céilí's Muse. This was not intentional, but merely serendipitous.
