= Cistern, Texas =

- Unincorporated community
- Location within Texas Location within the United States
- Coordinates: 29°48′57″N 97°13′07″W
- Country: United States
- State: Texas
- County: Fayette
- Established: 1853
- Elevation: 466 ft (142 m)

Population (2000)
  - Total: 75
- Time zone: UTC-6 (Central (CST))
  - Summer (DST): UTC-5 (CDT)
- ZIP code: 78941
- Area code: 361
- GNIS feature ID: 1332857

Cistern is an unincorporated community in southwestern Fayette County, Texas, United States. It is located on Texas State Highway 95, 12 miles (19 km) northwest of Flatonia. It was formerly known as Whiteside's Prairie and Cockrill's Hill.

Cistern had a population of 75 as of the 2000 census.

== History ==
Cistern is on a hill surrounded by much flatter prairie land. Originally, it was the portion of a league of land granted to John J. Whiteside by the government of Mexico in 1835 which early settlers called "Whiteside's Prairie". Stark S. Cockrill, who came from Missouri in 1852, was the first settler at the hill where he built a general merchandise store. Other settlers followed soon after and the town was surveyed and platted into blocks. At that point, the developing town was known as "Cockrill's Hill" and remained so until 1857, when the townspeople applied for a post office permit and changed the name of the town to "Milton" (the name of Cockrill's son). The application for that name was denied. After deliberation, the citizens decided to name the town "Cistern", because the water wells in the area had high mineral concentrations requiring that they use cisterns for potable water. It is said that the townspeople went to the large cistern at the mercantile store so often that the most common answer given when they were asked where they were going was "to the cistern". The Cistern post office opened in March 1858, and the town has been known by that name ever since.

In 1900, Cistern had 150 residents and a general merchandise store, a drugstore and saloon, a blacksmith shop with a gin, and a doctor. In 1950 Cistern had 150 people, two stores, two garages. The Cistern Post Office was discontinued in December, 1953, after which Cistern residents received mail from Flatonia. In the 1950s and 1960s, cotton became less popular as a crop, and more landowners turned to ranching and producing chickens. Some oilfields were discovered in the 1950s and 1960s, and a number of wells were drilled, although most were eventually plugged, with the land turned back into pasture. In the 1980s, Cistern had 75 residents and three businesses. In both the 1990 and 2000 censuses, the community had 75 residents.

== Culture ==
Cistern has Anglo-American, Czech American, and German-American residents. The community is focused on Catholic and Lutheran churches, the Harmony Club, fraternal organizations, and the local school.

== Education ==
Cistern is within the Flatonia Independent School District. During some points in its history, Cistern had its own school. In 1950, Cistern had a consolidated high school with two teachers.
