= PNO =

PNO may refer to:

- Pa-O National Organization, a political organization of the Pa-O people in Burma
- Pagan's Night Out, a social get-together held in Pagan and Neopagan communities
- Partit de la Nacion Occitana, a political party of Occitania
- Payment Network Operator, an operator of a network to perform for example credit card transactions
- Pecunia non olet, Latin for "money does not smell"
- Piano, in music notation
- Plasma-Nitrided Oxide
- Pneumothorax, in pulmonology
- Port of New Orleans, a port located in New Orleans, Louisiana
- Premerger Notification Office, in US FTC
- Public Network Operator
- Pyridine-N-oxide
