= Phyllis Curott =

American priestess, attorney, and writer

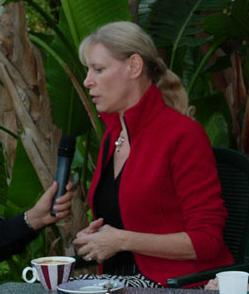
- Curott in Palermo
- Born: February 8, 1954 (age 72)
- Other name: Aradia
- Education: Brown University; New York University School of Law
- Organization: Temple of Ara
- Title: High Priestess
- Website: https://www.phylliscurott.com/

Phyllis Curott (born February 8, 1954), who goes under the craft name Aradia, is an American Wiccan priestess, attorney, and writer. She is founder and high priestess of the Temple of Ara, one of the oldest Wiccan congregations in the United States. She has been active as a leader in the Parliament of the World's Religions since 1993 in multiple roles including co-chair of the inaugural 1993 Women's Task Force and current Program Chair of the 2023 Parliament of the World's Religions in Chicago. She is also author of several published volumes on modern witchcraft and Goddess spirituality.

== Early life and education ==
Curott grew up in Lynbrook, Long Island. Her parents were agnostic-atheist, socially liberal intellectuals who encouraged her to make her own decisions regarding theology but taught her to adhere to the Golden Rule. Her father worked as a maritime trade union organizer, whilst her mother, who had come from a wealthy and well-educated background, was a diplomat involved in the civil rights movement for racial equality in the United States.

Curott went on to gain a Bachelor of Arts in philosophy from Brown University before going on to study for a Juris Doctor from New York University School of Law.

== Legal and film careers ==
After graduating from law school, Curott worked in Washington, D.C. as a lobbyist for Ralph Nader. Upon returning to New York City, Curott has practiced labor law, entertainment law and real estate law. Additionally, she has been an outspoken advocate for the religious liberties of Wiccans and other religious minorities. She won the right of Wiccan clergy to perform legally binding marriages and rituals in public parks.

Curott produced several independent films, including "New Year's Day" directed by Henry Jaglom. "New Year's Day" was selected as the US entry at the 1989 Venice Film Festival. In addition, Curott played a journalist in "Venice Venice"

== Religious and interfaith work ==
After law school, while managing a rock band called The Dates. Curott befriended another female manager who introduced her to Witchcraft. In 1981, Curott was initiated into Wicca and given the Craft name of Aradia.

Curott is a High Priestess and the founder and President of the Temple of Ara (formerly known as the Circle of Ara), one of the oldest Wiccan congregations in America. She is a President Emerita of Covenant of the Goddess (COG"). She has also served as a frequent guest minister at the Unitarian Universalist Church and the Cathedral of St. John the Divine in New York City. Curott has lectured and taught at the Learning Annex in New York and at Neo-Pagan and interfaith events.

While she was First Officer (President) of COG, Curott was at the center of two controversies at the 1993 Parliament of the Worlds Religions in Chicago. The Greek and Russian Orthodox delegations boycotted the Parliament of the World's Religions due to the inclusion of Curott as a speaker. The Chicago Park Commission initially denied COG's request for a permit to hold a ritual in Grant Park. After Curott challenged Chicago Archbishop Joseph Cardinal Bernadin on live television to support the Wiccans' right to circle in the park, the Park Commission reversed its decision and Curott led an interfaith rite honoring Mother Earth at Grant Park.

A global interfaith activist, Curott has advocated for women's spirituality and eco-spiritual religions. She has addressed the Parliament of the World's Religions in 1993, 2004 and 2009 as a keynote speaker, along with the Dalai Lama. She is a trustee of the Council for the Parliament of the World's Religions and serves on its executive committee. In November 2012, Curott was unanimously elected to serve as vice chair of the Parliament of the World's Religions for the year 2013. has also served as a member of the Assembly of World Religious Leaders and Clergy Advisory Board of the Network of Spiritual Progressives. In 1999, Curott participated in the Harvard University Pluralism Project's Consultation on Religious Discrimination and Accommodation. As a member of the United Nations' NGO Committee on the Status of Women, Curott participated in the planning of the United Nations' Beijing Forum on the Status of Women, addressing the Forum on the topic of religion and the status of women. She is also spearheaded and serves as co-chair of the Parliament of the World's Religions inaugural Women's Task Force.

She was honored by Jane magazine as one of the "Ten Gutsiest Women of the Year".

== Publications ==
Curott is the author of five books on modern Witchcraft and Goddess spirituality and has contributed to several others. Curott wrote her memoir, Book of Shadows, which chronicled her introduction to modern Witchcraft through initiation as a Wiccan priestess, in an effort to dispel misconceptions about Witches. Her works have been translated into Spanish, Italian, Dutch, German and Turkish.

== Bibliography ==
=== Wrote ===
- 1998 - Book of Shadows: A Modern Woman's Journey into the Wisdom of Witchcraft and the Magic of the Goddess (Broadway Books) ISBN 0-7679-0054-5
- 2001 - WitchCrafting: A Spiritual Guide to Making Magic (Broadway Books) ISBN 0-7679-0825-2
- 2004 - The Love Spell: An Erotic Memoir of Spiritual Awakening (Gotham Books/Penguin) ISBN 1-59240-097-3
- 2018 - Wicca Made Easy: Awaken The Divine Magic Within You (Hay House)
- 2020 - The Witches' Wisdom Tarot (Hay House) ISBN 1-7881-7321-X
- 2022 - Spells for Living Well: A Witch's Guide for Manifesting Change, Well-being, and Wonder (Hay House)

=== Contributed ===
- 1995 - Sourcebook of the World's Religions: an Interfaith Guide to Religion and Spirituality edited by Joel Diederik Beversluis (Sourcebook Project) ISBN 0-9637897-1-6, ISBN 978-0-9637897-1-6
- 1995 - People of the Earth: The New Pagans Speak Out (reissued as: Being a Pagan: Druids, Wiccans, and Witches Today) by Ellen Evert Hopman & Lawrence Bond (Inner Traditions) ISBN 0-89281-559-0, ISBN 978-0-89281-559-3
- 2002 - Wiccan Wisdom Keepers: Modern Day Witches Speak on Environmentalism, Feminism, Motherhood, Wiccan Lore, and More by Sally Griffyn (Samuel Weiser) ISBN 1578632579, ISBN 978-1578632572
- 2004 - Pop! Goes the Witch: The Disinformation Guide to 21st Century Witchcraft by Fiona Horne (contributor) (The Disinformation Company) ISBN 0-9729529-5-0, ISBN 978-0-9729529-5-8
- 2005 - Cakes and Ale for the Pagan Soul: Spells, Recipes, and Reflections from Neopagan Elders and Teachers by Patricia Telesco (Crossing Press) ISBN 1-58091-164-1, ISBN 978-1-58091-164-1
- 2012- Women, Spirituality, and Transformative Leadership: Where Grace Meets Power edited by Kathe Shaaf et al. (SkyLight Paths Publishing) ISBN 978-1-59473-313-0
- 2023 - Women Advancing Knowledge Equity: The Parliament of the World's Religions edited by Colleen D. Hartung (Parliament of the World's Religions) ISBN 979-8869580122
