= The Wiccan Web =

2001 book by Patricia Telesco and Sirona Knight

- Author: Patricia Telesco; Sirona Knight
- Publisher: Citadel Press
- Publication date: 2001
- Pages: 176
- ISBN: 0-8065-2197-X
- Dewey Decimal: 004.678

The Wiccan Web: Surfing the Magic on the Internet is a 2001 book by Patricia Telesco and Sirona Knight published by Citadel Press, an imprint of Kensington Publishing. The book focuses on online Wiccan culture in the late 1990s and early 2000s, and is structured as a how-to guide for users new to technology. It discusses topics such as finding Wicca-related websites, interacting with online neopagan communities, and integrating Wiccan spells and rituals with technology.

Critical reception for The Wiccan Web was negative. Reviewers described the book as unintentionally comedic, criticising its understanding of neopagan practice, its rewrites of existing Wiccan creeds, and its unusual spells. The book was published during a period of rapid growth of online communities dedicated to new religious movements; it received attention as a summary of neopagan online culture and a symbol of its increasing cultural importance.

== Synopsis ==
The Wiccan Web is a user guide to the online Wiccan culture of the late 1990s and early 2000s. It opens with a chapter on accessing the Internet, noting that while experienced users could disregard that chapter, some potential readers may have had little or no exposure to using computers or finding websites. Neopagan-specific advice starts in the second chapter, which discusses the prospect of setting up an altar around a computer. The authors give examples such as arranging flowers or crystals around a computer, setting up a Wiccan-themed wallpaper and screensaver, and technology-specific consecration rituals.

The book proposes various spells and rituals specific to technology, such as spells to assist an antivirus software's functionality, to aid finding a particular site with a search engine, or to prevent the theft of a laptop. This section of the book received criticism; a Wiccan reviewer felt the spells sounded "hokey" and compared their ritual chants to "high-school cheers", while a secular reviewer felt elements of some rituals, such as rubbing tinctures on a computer screen, were bizarre. As well as individual spells, The Wiccan Web discusses the practice of performing rituals with others online. While it encourages these rituals, it describes logistical issues for readers to resolve before performing them, such as scheduling practices at a time of day that works across several time zones.

Do as you will and spam none.

— "The Web Wiccan Rede", the book's proposed variant of the Wiccan Rede

The next chapter of The Wiccan Web repurposes existing neopagan ritual for technology. It rewrites a number of Wiccan creeds to fit the book's theme; the Wiccan Rede, a version of the Golden Rule, and the Charge of the Goddess are rewritten into the "Web Wiccan Rede" and the "Charge of the Cyber Goddess" respectively. The Wiccan practitioner Barbara Fisher described the latter rewrite as done "so poorly that it comes across as parody". The book then lists many ancient gods and goddesses from sources such as Celtic, Greco-Roman, and Egyptian mythology, describing ways the reader could invoke them for technomagical purposes, including multiple deities for ritual cybersex. These include the Celtic warrior queen Medb, alongside more conventional love and lust deities.

The book discusses netiquette, both general and neopagan-specific. As well as overviewing subjects of general interest to internet users, such as internet safety, interacting with new users, and dealing with flame wars, it discusses examples specific to Wiccans, such as etiquette for participating in an online ritual. The Wiccan Web lists many contemporary acronyms and emoticons, and proposes a number of new ones specific to Wiccan communities. The book ends by explaining how to set up a personal web page and by listing many contemporary neopagan websites, including both the authors' personal websites.

== Publication and reception ==
Reading it was like watching a train wreck in slow motion; I wanted to cry out and stop the impending doom, but could do nothing but keep turning pages and watch the silliness unfold.

— Barbara Fisher, newWitch

The Wiccan Web was co-authored by Patricia Telesco and Sirona Knight, both popular authors on Wicca and modern paganism. It was published in 2001 through Citadel Press, an imprint of Kensington Publishing. The book was agented by Lisa Hagan, then of Paraview Literary Agency, who focuses on books on alternative and paranormal subjects. Citadel, which specialized at the time in Wicca-oriented books, saw The Wiccan Web as "solely for entertainment purposes". The author Catherine Sanders, in her book Wicca's Charm, perceived their publication of the work as a "market-savvy" attempt to capitalize on a rapidly growing audience for pagan literature.

The book received negative reviews. In an article for the Wiccan magazine newWitch, Barbara Fisher described The Wiccan Web as "like watching a train wreck in slow motion" and called its "sheer goofiness [...] astounding". She criticised its surface-level and "mechanistic" understanding of Wiccan practice, singling out its ignorance of the role of willpower in the religion's rituals. Though Fisher considered The Wiccan Web "inadvertently very funny", she found it useless as a serious guide to online pagan subcultures. The journalist and satirist David Thorpe sarcastically referred to The Wiccan Web as "one of the most important documents of the information age", mocking its poor understanding of technology, its association of figures such as Aengus and Coventina with rituals to create webrings, and its proposed emoticons, such as the use of :-) *#/ (-: to represent sex magic.

Other analyses of The Wiccan Web saw it as a symbol of the era's growing online presence of new religious movements. Sanders identified the book as a significant how-to guide for interacting in online Wiccan subcultures. Writing from a Christian perspective, she contextualized The Wiccan Web alongside Wiccan e-commerce storefronts, popular contemporary websites such as The Witches' Voice, and in-person coven meetings arranged online to present a narrative of Wicca as an increasingly prominent religion. In his 2005 book Cyberhenge: Modern Pagans on the Internet, the scholar of religious studies Douglas E. Cowan drew attention to The Wiccan Web's focus on "personal, instinctual associations" and explicit acknowledgement that its readers may disagree with its conclusions, describing this as part of an "often exuberant attitude of religious individualism" amongst neopagans. Cowan referred to The Wiccan Web again in a discussion of material use in new religions in the Brill Handbook of Hyper-real Religion. He drew attention to its suggestions to use old or broken computer equipment for ritual purposes, such as using computer keys for divination purposes, and contextualized this within expanding norms for use of ritual objects in religious practice.

== See also ==
- Technopaganism
- Hyper-real religion
