= Shawn Willis =

American football player (born 1983)

No. 37
- Position: Fullback

Personal information
- Born: January 28, 1983 (age 43); Flatonia, Texas, U.S.
- Listed height: 6 ft 1 in (1.85 m)
- Listed weight: 267 lb (121 kg)

Career information
- High school: Flatonia (TX)
- College: Oklahoma State
- NFL draft: 2006: undrafted

Career history
- San Diego Chargers (2006)*; San Jose SaberCats (2007)
- * Offseason or practice squad member only

Awards and highlights
- ArenaBowl champion (2007)
- Stats at ArenaFan.com

Shawn Willis (born January 28, 1983) is an American former football fullback. He played college football at Oklahoma State.

== Early life and college ==
Willis was born in Flatonia, Texas; he attended Flatonia Secondary School, where he starred as a running back. Following his graduation, he played college football at Oklahoma State University. He appeared in 38 games as a running back (starting 16). During his time at Oklahoma State, Willis majored in Microbiology/Medical Technology.

== Professional career ==
After going undrafted in the 2006 NFL draft, Willis signed a two-year contract with the San Diego Chargers on May 1. He was later released on August 17, 2006.

On October 4, 2006, Willis signed with the San Jose SaberCats of the Arena Football League (AFL) for the 2007 season. He did not see any playing time in his lone season with the team; he did, however, win an AFL Championship when the SaberCats defeated the Columbus Destroyers in ArenaBowl XXI at the end of the year. Willis was placed on the team's injured reserve list on February 18, 2008; he was waived by the SaberCats five days later.

== Personal life ==
Willis currently resides in Flatonia, Texas.
