= Technopaganism =

Merging of neopaganism and magical ritual with digital technologies

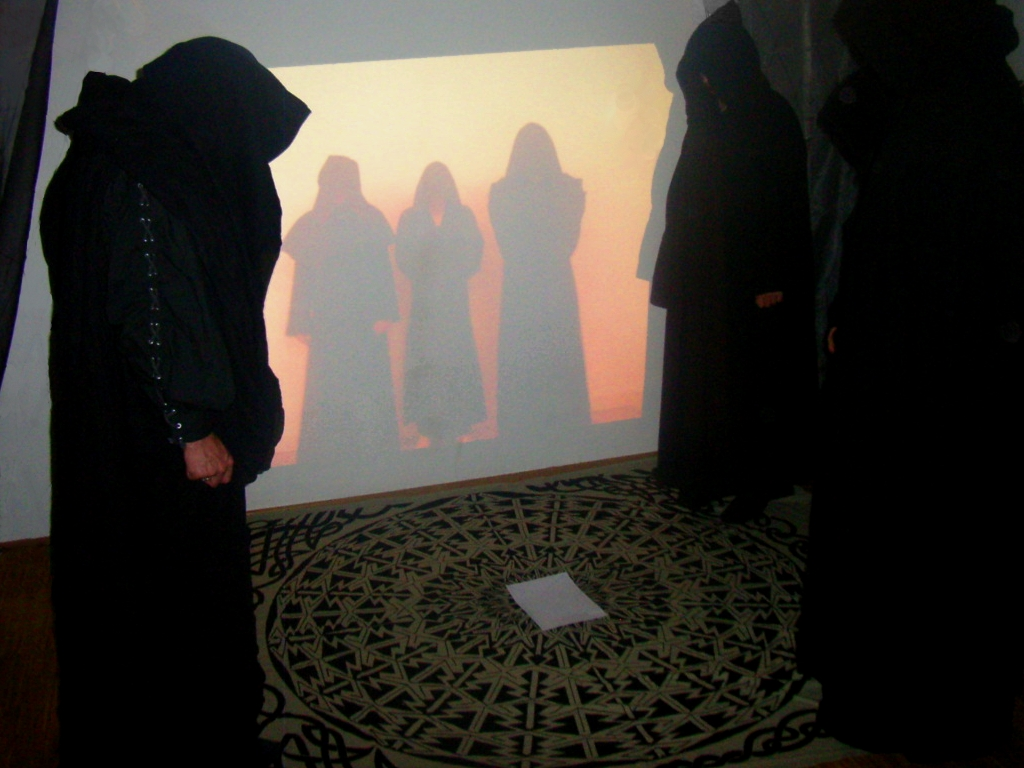
A chaos magic ritual that uses videoconferencing

Technopaganism, as described by Victoria Dos Santos, is "a term encompassing a variety of practices and expressions related to contemporary paganism, popular culture, and spiritual pursuits in digital environments." The Internet, for instance, is considered by some technopagans to have spiritual significance or unique magical applications.

== Definition ==
Technopaganism is concerned with spiritual and magical aspects of technology and, sometimes, the interconnections between technology and society. Dos Santos classified technopaganism into two types: the first pertains to the adaptation of various neopagan currents to online environments (e.g., via virtual communities or collaborative software), while the second comprises a body of neopagan beliefs and practices greatly influenced by information and communications technology and "deeply merged with cybernetic culture".

A notable instance of technopagan adaptation of neopagan practices is the creation and distribution of virtual Books of Shadows and sacred texts through the Internet; similarly, virtual world platforms such as Second Life and VRChat are used to connect with others and conduct rituals.

== Beliefs ==
A common element of technopaganism is the adaptation of neopagan beliefs, such as animism, to technology and cyberspace. Dos Santos writes that a fundamental aspect of technopagan animism is "a dialogic relationship with the digital environment itself." In a 1995 Wired article, technopagan Mark Pesce describes how, upon first using NCSA Mosaic, he realized that the World Wide Web was the first emergent property of the Internet: "It's displaying all the requisite qualities – it came on very suddenly, it happened everywhere simultaneously, and it's self-organizing. I call that the Web eating the Net." He went on to create VRML, with one of his motivations having been to bring about a spatial dimension of the Web.

== See also ==
- AI mysticism
  - AI as a deity
- Ceremonial magic
- Discordianism
- Hyper-real religion
- PODSnet
- Relationship between science and religion
- The Wiccan Web
- Virtual religion
