= Book of Shadows (biography) =

1998 book by Phyllis Curott

- Author: Phyllis Curott
- Language: English
- Publisher: Broadway Books
- Publication date: 1998
- Pages: 320
- ISBN: 0-7679-0054-5
- OCLC: 38925249
- Dewey Decimal: 133.4/3
- LC Class: BF1571 .C87 1998

Book of Shadows: A Modern Woman's Journey into the Wisdom of Witchcraft and the Magic of the Goddess is a 1998 memoir written by author Phyllis Curott, published by Broadway Books.

== Promotional summary ==
When high-powered Manhattan lawyer Phyllis Curott began exploring witchcraft in a women's group in the 1970s, she discovered a spiritual movement that defied all stereotypes. Encountering neither Satanic rites nor eccentric spinsters, she came to know a clandestine religion of the Goddess that had been forced into hiding over the course of history.

The Book of Shadows chronicles Curott's remarkable initiation into Wicca, her ascent to the position of Wiccan high priestess, and her efforts to reconcile her newfound spirituality with her struggles as a woman rising through the ranks of the corporate world. Along the way, she relates the history of witchcraft. She also shares many traditional Wiccan practices – such as casting a circle, drawing down the Goddess, and casting spells for health, prosperity, and love. She explains all this from a feminist point of view.

The title Book of Shadows refers to the name used for a book that contains magical and religious texts in the religion of Wicca.
