= Céilí's Muse =

Céilí's Muse was a Celtic folk band active in Houston, Texas from 1989 until 1997. Formed by Maggie Drennon and Mary Maddux, the duo performed a combination of traditional and contemporary Irish and Scottish folk songs at local festivals and venues like Houston's Red Lion Pub and later McGonigel's Mucky Duck Pub. Their first album was a limited release cassette, One Voice in 1991. At the CD release performance for their second album, Circles of Stone in 1993 at the Mucky Duck, Maggie saw Chuck Ivy enter the room and called from the stage "You know something about sound. Fix it!" thus enlisting him as their sound engineer for the next year.

Melanie O'Sullivan joined as a singer in January 1994 and Chuck moved from behind the sound board onto the stage as bass guitar and Chapman Stick player in October of the same year for the recording of the group's third album Céilí's Muse Live: Muse Secret #73.

In the summer of 1995 Mary moved to New England leaving the group searching for a guitarist. A temporary replacement was found in local musician/songwriter, Leora Salo, who played with Céilí's Muse on the Houston Celtic live festival recording Blarney Fest '95, an album also featuring Houston's Flying Fish Sailors and Clandestine, locally, and opening with the band for the Cranberries. Leora's time in the band was brief, however, so again they recruited from their support staff, this time pulling in their live albums' engineer Anders Johansson to add acoustic and electric guitars to the mix. An album with this lineup was released in late 1995 as The Dark Lady and the band toured the Midwest and the East Coast as well as the North Texas Irish Festival. This lineup also performed at and recorded another festival the next year, Son of Blarneyfest, again with the Flying Fish Sailors and introducing another local Celtic group, Gordian Knot. Mary Maddux also returned to perform a few songs solo for this show.

Between the fall of 1996 and spring of 1997, the band reorganized yet again with Melanie leaving the group and Mike Byers joining on guitar, bouzouki, and mandolin. Wolf Loescher of Austin's "Two O'Clock Courage" also sat in on percussion for numerous gigs during the Spring and Summer of 1997. Chuck left the group in 1997 and the group performed a few more shows as Céilí's Muse after he left, but ultimately disbanded, with some members regrouping as SixMileBridge the next year. Still, Céilí's Muse was nominated for Houston Press music award for Best Ethnic Music in 1998, around a year after they broke up. They lost out to The Gypsies who were actually still performing at the time.

Circles of Stone

1. Crazy Man Michael (Fairport Convention cover)
2. Ca the Yowes To the Knowes
3. The Queen of Argyll (Silly Wizard cover)
4. The Tinkerman's Daughter
5. My Lagan Love
6. The Green Fields of France (Eric Bogle cover)
7. All That You Ask Me (Archie Fisher cover)
8. Johnny Jump Up
9. The Winter Is Past
10. The Lea Rig
11. Red Haired Mary
12. Ae Fond Kiss
13. Mothers, Daughters, Wives
14. What You Do With What You've Got (Dick Gaughan cover)

Muse Secret #73 - 1994

1. Joy of My Heart
2. Leaves in the Wind
3. Carraigdhoun
4. Johnny I Hardly Knew Ye
5. The Scotsman
6. With Her Head Tucked Underneath Her Arm
7. All Around My Hat
8. She Moved Through the Fair
9. Song for Ireland
10. Cockles and Mussels (Molly Malone)
11. Nobody's Moggy Now
12. Lily the Pink

The Dark Lady - 1995

1. Korelia's Song
2. Ashfields and Brine (feat. George Furey)
3. The Dark Lady
4. Wild Geese
5. Don't Get Married, Girls
6. The Galway Farmer
7. Heroes (feat. George Furey)
8. Anywhere
9. Arthur McBride
10. Crow on the Cradle
11. Donegal Diamond
12. Twiddley-Aye
