= Patricia Telesco =

American writer, and lecturer

Patricia "Trish" Telesco (born 1960) is an American writer, herbalist, poet, lecturer, Wiccan priestess, and folk magician who has written more than 60 books on a variety of subjects ranging from self-help and cookbooks to magic, folklore and global religion. Articles by Telesco have appeared in several mainstream publications such as Cosmo, Woman's World, and Cats' Magazine, and in such Neopagan publications such as Circle Network News and popular websites such as The Witches' Voice.

Telesco began her Wiccan education and initiation on her own, but later received initiation into the Strega tradition of Italy. She is a trustee for the Universal Federation of Pagans, a member of the Authors Guild, a member of the Society for Creative Anachronism and a professional member of the Wiccan-Pagan Press Alliance. She (or her writing) has appeared on several television segments including Sightings and National Geographic Today – Solstice Celebrations. She has also appeared at major events in the New Age and Neopagan communities such as the Starwood Festival and Pagan Spirit Gathering. She runs a mail-order business called Hourglass Creations, and lives in Western New York, with her husband, two sons, and middle non-binary child.

== Bibliography ==
- Cat Magic: Mews, Myths, and Mystery (1999) Destiny Books ISBN 0-89281-774-7, ISBN 978-0-89281-774-0
- A Charmed Life (2000) New Page Books ISBN 1-56414-487-9, ISBN 978-1-56414-487-4
- The Cyber Spellbook: Magick in the Virtual World (2000) New Page Books ISBN 1-56414-582-4, ISBN 978-1-56414-582-6
- An Enchanted Life : An Adept's Guide to Masterful Magick (2001) New Page Books ISBN 1-56414-566-2, ISBN 978-1-56414-566-6
- A Floral Grimoire: Plant Charms, Spells, Recipes, and Rituals (2001) Citadel ISBN 0-8065-2221-6, ISBN 978-0-8065-2221-0
- Futuretelling: A Complete Guide to Divination (1998) Crossing Press ISBN 0-89594-872-9, ISBN 978-0-89594-872-4
- Ghosts, Spirits and Hauntings (1999) Crossing Press ISBN 0-89594-871-0, ISBN 978-0-89594-871-7
- Goddess in My Pocket: Simple Spells, Charms, Potions, and Chants to Get You Everything You Want (1998) HarperSanFrancisco ISBN 0-06-251550-0, ISBN 978-0-06-251550-6
- Healer's Handbook: A Holistic Guide to Wellness in the New Age (1997) Weiser Books ISBN 1-57863-018-5, ISBN 978-1-57863-018-9
- The Herbal Arts: A Handbook of Gardening, Recipes, Healing, Crafts, and Spirituality (1998) Citadel ISBN 0-8065-1964-9, ISBN 978-0-8065-1964-7
- How To Be A Wicked Witch: Good Spells, Charms, Potions and Notions for Bad Days (2000) Fireside ISBN 0-684-86004-X, ISBN 978-0-684-86004-6
- The Kitchen Witch Companion: Simple and Sublime Culinary Magic (2005) Citadel ISBN 0-8065-2670-X, ISBN 978-0-8065-2670-6
- Kitchen Witch's Guide To Brews And Potions (2005) New Page Books ISBN 1-56414-790-8, ISBN 978-1-56414-790-5
- Labyrinth Walking: Patterns of Power (2001) Citadel ISBN 0-8065-2217-8, ISBN 978-0-8065-2217-3
- The Language of Dreams (1997) Crossing Press ISBN 0-89594-836-2, ISBN 978-0-89594-836-6
- A Little Book of Love Magic (1999) Crossing Press ISBN 0-89594-887-7, ISBN 978-0-89594-887-8
- A Little Book of Mirror Magic: Meditations, Myths, Spells (2003) Crossing Press ISBN 1-58091-144-7, ISBN 978-1-58091-144-3
- The Magick of Folk Wisdom (2000) Book Sales ISBN 0-7858-1205-9, ISBN 978-0-7858-1205-0
- Mastering Candle Magick (2003) New Page Books ISBN 1-56414-654-5, ISBN 978-1-56414-654-0
- Mirror, Mirror: Reflections of the Sacred Self (1999) Book World ISBN 1-881542-51-3, ISBN 978-1-881542-51-3
- Money Magick: How to Use Magick to Gain Prosperity (2001) New Page Books ISBN 1-56414-550-6, ISBN 978-1-56414-550-5
- Seasons of the Sun: Celebrations from the World's Spiritual Traditions (1996) Atrium Publishers Group ISBN 0-87728-872-0, ISBN 978-0-87728-872-5
- Shaman in a 9 to 5 World (2000) The Crossing Press ISBN 0-89594-982-2, ISBN 978-0-89594-982-0
- Spinning Spells, Weaving Wonders: Modern Magic for Everyday Life (1996) Crossing Press ISBN 0-89594-803-6, ISBN 978-0-89594-803-8
- The Teen Book Of Shadows: Star Signs, Spells, Potions, and Powers (2004) Citadel ISBN 0-8065-2410-3, ISBN 978-0-8065-2410-8
- 365 Goddess: A Daily Guide to the Magic and Inspiration of the Goddess (1998) HarperOne ISBN 0-06-251568-3, ISBN 978-0-06-251568-1
- A Victorian Grimoire: Romance - Enchantment - Magic (2002) Llewellyn Publications ISBN 0-87542-784-7, ISBN 978-0-87542-784-3
- The Wiccan Web: Surfing the Magic on the Internet (2001) Citadel ISBN 0-8065-2197-X, ISBN 978-0-8065-2197-8
- Wishing Well: Empowering Your Hopes and Dreams (1997) Crossing Press ISBN 0-89594-870-2, ISBN 978-0-89594-870-0
- A Witch's Beverages and Brews (2000) Career Press ISBN 1-56414-486-0, ISBN 978-1-56414-486-7
- The Witch's Book of Wisdom (2003) Citadel ISBN 0-8065-2411-1, ISBN 978-0-8065-2411-5
- Your Book of Shadows: How to Write Your Own Magickal Spells (2000) Citadel ISBN 0-8065-2071-X, ISBN 978-0-8065-2071-1
