= Flatonia Independent School District =

School district in Texas, United States

Address
- 400 East 4th Flatonia, Texas, 78941; United States

District information
- Grades: PK–12
- Schools: 3
- NCES District ID: 4819280

Students and staff
- Students: 659 (2023–2024)
- Teachers: 57.81 (on an FTE basis)
- Student–teacher ratio: 11.40:1

Other information
- Website: www.flatoniaisd.net

Flatonia Independent School District is a public school district based in Flatonia, Texas (USA).

The district has two campuses - Flatonia Secondary (Grades 7-12) and Flatonia Elementary (Grades K-6).

In 2009, the school district was rated "recognized" by the Texas Education Agency.
