= Spiral Dance (band) =

Australian musical group

- Origin: Adelaide, Australia
- Genres: Folk rock, pagan
- Years active: 1992–present
- Members: Adrienne Piggott; Rena Lannigan; Paul Gooding; Matt Collyer; Simon Despoja; Mikk Passuke; Bronwyn Lloyd; Nicola Barnes
- Website: http://www.spiraldance.com.au

Spiral Dance is an Adelaide-based Pagan folk rock band whose musical focus is on the concepts of magic, myth and legend.

Fusing folk-lore and legend with pagan themes, Spiral Dance presents a blend of traditional English folk-rock with self-penned songs and tunes.

The band was formed in 1992 as a project to explore some of the more mystical elements in life and has drawn its energy from the songwriting and vocal skills of Adrienne Piggott. Adrienne's lyrics are supported by guitar and button accordion, underpinned with bass and percussion, all arranged to blend acoustic folk-rock with Celtic harmony.

To date, the band has released nine albums along with appearing on the Green Album and toured extensively in Australia, the United States and the United Kingdom. Highlights include playing concerts with Damh the Bard, Witchfest International, Glastonbury Faerie Ball, The Mercian Gathering and numerous shows throughout the United Kingdom.

== Current band line-up ==
- Adrienne Piggott : lead vocals/bodhran
- Rena Lannigan: guitar
- Paul Gooding : button accordion/vocals
- Matt Colyer : drums/percussion
- Mikk Pääsuke : bass guitar
- Simon Despoja : violin
- Bronwyn Lloyd : harmony Vocals
- Nicola Barnes : harmony Vocals

== Discography ==
- Woman of the Earth (1996)
- Over the Nine Waves (1997)
- Magick (1999)
- Notes of Being (2002)
- The Quickening (2006)
- Live - Worts 'n' All (2007)
- From The Mist, A Retrospective (2010)
- Through A Sylvan Doorway (2012)
- Wickerman - single release (2014)
- The Green Album (2016)
- Land and Legend (2017)
- Thirteen Notes (2025)

=== Promotional singles ===
- Spirit of the Green - from The Green Album (2016)
