= The Witches' Voice =

Wiccan and Pagan community website, 1997–2019

- Screenshot of The Witches' Voice site as of 7 June 2010
- Available in: English
- Dissolved: December 31, 2019; 6 years ago
- Owner: The Witches' Voice Inc.
- Creators: Wren Walker and Fritz Jung
- Website: witchvox.com
- Commercial: no
- Registration: optional
- Launched: 1997; 29 years ago
- Current status: Defunct Much of the original content is still available on the Wayback Machine

The Witches' Voice (WitchVox) was an online information and networking resource for the Wiccan and Pagan community. It is a non-profit organization founded and run by Wren Walker and Fritz Jung in 1997. It won Peoples' Choice under Spirituality in the 2002 Webby Awards, and is considered one of the "most extensive" Pagan websites. The organization's website was retired on December 31, 2019.

== Site features ==
The "Wren's Nest" news section of The Witches' Voice was used as a source for other Pagan publications. The site includes posts by businesses and individuals, semi-monthly essays submitted by users, columns by regular contributors, and a monthly selection of Pagan musicians and bands. Witchvox also includes Witches of the World, which facilitates networking among site members and groups.

Since 2000, The Witches’ Voice included a section called “Bardic Circle” which is “a gathering… to share stories, magic and music”. While this is traditionally done in a wooded area around a campfire, The Witches’ Voice invited NeoPagan musicians to share their music in downloadable mp3 files with Witches around the world. Some of the best musical artists and bands in NeoPagan circles participated over a ten-year period, including: Gaia Consort, Damh the Bard, SONA, Isaac Bonewits, Loke E Coyote. Beltana. sede, Magicfolk, Abigail Spinner McBride, Telling Point, The Reverend Rat, Cassandra Syndrome, Jhenah Telyndru, Lady Isadora, KIVA, Tribeworld Ensemble, Jay Atwood (who played didgeridoo for Wicked Tinkers and their album Banger for Breakfast), Tiffany Moon, Soren, Madd Mother Moose and Kari Tauring.

The Witches' Voice was the largest international Neopagan site, with thousands of personal notices from users seeking to network with each other.

== Awards ==
The Witches' Voice received the People's Choice Webby Award for Spirituality in 2002 as a result of a write-in campaign. The site was one of only two People's Choice winners which had not been nominated for the award that year.
