= SONA (band) =

American folk music band

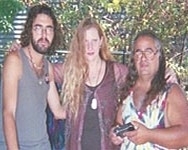
- Joe Credit III, "Beltana" Holzer and "Papa" Joe Credit

Background information
- Origin: Missouri and Kansas
- Genres: Neopagan folkadelic, folk rock
- Years active: 2000–2009
- Labels: Wiccabilly Studios, Magyar Magick
- Past members: Joe Credit III, Beltana Spellsinger, Joe Credit, Jr.
- Website: link

SONA was a neopagan music band that toured and performed at neopagan gatherings and other events throughout the Midwestern United States during the early 2000's. SONA consisted of three members Beltana Spellsinger, "Papa" Joe Credit and his son Joe Credit III. They were sometimes referred to as "the Peter, Paul and Mary of Pagan music."

Beltana played the conga drums, Papa Joe played guitar and Joe Credit III played mandolin. Each member also contributed to songwriting for the group.

== Formation ==
The members of SONA met in 2000 at Brushwood Folklore Center in New York City as they attended the Sirius Rising and Starwood music festivals. Beltana reports having a dream about a mandolin player the night before meeting the two Joes. The next day she saw Joe Credit III carrying his mandolin and introduced herself to him and his father. They held their first performance together to a crowd of 500 the day after.

== Name of the band ==
Shortly after their first performance, SONA was invited to perform at the Festival at Tara at Camp Gaia near Kansas City, Kansas. On the way to this concert the three discussed Buddhist philosophy, and Joe Credit III told the story of the lute player and the Buddha. This parable describes how the Buddha taught a lute player how using our energies to find enlightenment is like bringing the lute's strings to just the right tautness so that the instrument will be in tune, and so, as we keep our energies in balance we will be in tune and find enlightenment.

Not long after this discussion, Papa Joe found a book of Buddhist teaching which revealed that the lute player's name was Sona. When the three of them got together at Wolvenwold, Beltana's home, Papa Joe shared this information with Beltana and Joe Credit III and the band decided to adopt the name SONA for themselves. The use of all capital letters for SONA was to distinguish the band from the Buddhist lute player, and later, from other groups of the same name.

== Musical style ==
The band was self-described as Folkadelic, a combination of their modern folk acoustic style with psychedelic vocals.

Songs written by Beltana often expressed a psychedelic bent or a soft/hard rock sound. Joe Credit III preferences include grungy world music and jazz chord progressions, but also Paganized Gospel. Papa Joe showed a variety of singer-songwriter styles from folk rock and Caribbean music to Texas swing and polka, adding some fun and humor to much of the music.

The contributions of Trickster (from Loke E. Coyote) in the studio should not be ignored when speaking of SONA's musical style. Trickster recorded and produced SONA's Spoonwalk CD in 2002.

Pagan musical influences on SONA include: Green Crown, Emerald Rose, Loke E. Coyote, S.J. Tucker, Gaia Consort, Sede, Dreamtrybe, The Druids, The Raft, Spoonfed Tribe, Gretchen McMahon, Dana Davis, Michelle Mays, Burning Sage, and others.

== Tours ==
After playing at the Festival at Tara, their next gigs were at the Austin and Houston Pagan Pride Day events in Texas in 2001. There they met Trickster of Wiccabilly studios who invited them to participate in the full stage Pagan rock opera Druid Four Winds.

SONA then began performing at a number of concert venues at Pagan gatherings: Pagan Spirit Gathering, Summerset, Heartland, Fire Festival, CMA Beltane 2001, Magickal Weekend at St. Louis, Spring Fire II in Indianapolis, Pagan Pride in Dallas, Magickal Hibernation at Ozark Avalon, and concerts at the DragonDance festival and other festivals at Beltana's home campground called Wolvenwold.

In 2003, SONA took a break due to personal needs of their performers. After a hiatus of three years, SONA came back together in 2006. A much hoped-for additional CD was not produced, but they began doing concerts again in 2007.

== Reunion and final breakup ==
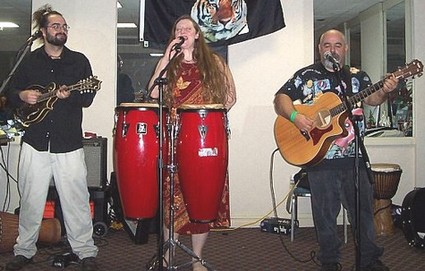
A picture of SONA at their reunion concert in 2007 at Columbia, MO.

SONA reunited in February 2007 at the Magical Hibernation festival, sponsored by Ozark Avalon and held at the Quality Inn in Columbia. Fans welcomed them back with much pleasure and appreciation. Following this, they also appeared at Tara, Heartland, Wytchehaven and at Wolvenwold.

In 2009, after a debate among Wolvenwold members over campground rules, SONA members, being divided by the issue, split up. At this time all three SONA members embarked on separate musical projects. Joe Credit III decided to relocate to St. Louis and involve himself in the music scene there. Beltana started a women's music group called Bellawyck. On occasion the Joes have played their instruments and backed up Beltana's bands, Bellawyck and then Spellsinger.

The possibility of a reunion concert always lingers. As the lyrics of one of SONA's songs ("Little Song") say:

“Before we make our exodus
remembrance my friend
The Joi De Vivre and Unity
And we will return again"

== Post-SONA years ==
The three have gone on to personal projects with continued success.

Joe Credit III has played mandolin with many groups, including Pikin Likin’ and Skinny White Chick. Singer-songwriter S.J. Tucker (known as "Queen of the Bards") wrote a song about him and her band's trip to Washington, D.C. entitled "Mandolin Holy Man". He has done his share of street playing in Springfield and St. Louis, MO. In Springfield he has sung and played guitar and mandolin with The Voodoo Lounge Gypsies. He has joined in with Greg Bucking as a part of the Vine Brothers in Brooklyn Cafe playing jazz. Joe Credit III has also been the mandolin player for Opal Fly and the Swatters. And he was seen playing in Kansas City with both Greg Bucking and Opal Fly. He has recently been seen playing in Western Automatic, a Kansas City swing band with Papa Joe and Scott Devouton. Since being in SONA, Joe Credit III has written new songs such as "Avocado" and "Sure Thing Myth".

Beltana continued to write songs, such as "Eorthe's Song" which she recorded in 2003 and "Sonorous Sanctum" which was No. 1 on the mp3.com.au acoustic charts in March 2004. In the summer of 2007, Beltana formed a band of women called BellaWyck (i.e., meaning "beautiful witch") made up of her sister Kittin, Holly (a.k.a. "Boom Boom Valhalla") and their friend Jennie from Columbia, Missouri. Their first concert was at Ozark Avalon's Harvest Homecoming on August 31, 2007. BellaWyck produced a self-titled EP and the group toured for three years before breaking up. During this time Beltana began incorporating Hindu chants into her repertoire. Following Bellawyck, she made herself the front person in a Pagan rock band she named Spellsinger, which is currently touring. She now prefers to go by her mundane name, Bernadette, and tends to reserve the name Beltana for sacred circles.

Papa Joe continues to play rhythm guitar, both solo and with different groups, including with his son Joe Credit III. Papa Joe also works with young people in relation to algorithm education.

== Discography ==
SONA released three CDs:

MeGaPaGaTeXaPaLooZa
Recorded live in April 2001 and co-created with Trickster (who had 8 songs on the CD). SONAs recordings on this CD are:

1. "Mary's Blue"
2. "Blessed Be"
3. "Pagan Polka"
4. "Land of the Sidhe"
5. "A Paean to Mead"
6. "Snails Ho"
7. "Burning Time in Texas"

Spoonwalk
Recorded in 2001 at Wiccabilly studios

1. "The Well"
2. "Tuesday"
3. "Meditation"
4. "Little Song"
5. "Pagan Polka"
6. "Blues River"
7. "Burnin' Time in Texas"
8. "Burn in Hell"
9. "Paper Floor"
10. "Land of the Sidhe"
11. "Tate's Dream"
12. "Spoon" (First sung in concert at CMA Beltane 2001).
13. (Hidden Track: "I’ll Kill You" from the Druid Four Winds rock opera written by Trickster.)

Acousticnakedladyland
Produced in July 2002, Magyar Magick

1. "Gypsy Song"
2. "Bliss Comes from the Realization of Impermanence"
3. "Buncha Lady"
4. "Merry Meet"
5. "Snails Ho!"
6. "Millay-D:" (From poetry written by Edna St. Vincent Millay)
7. "Patience Isn't About Things"
8. "Valkyrie"
9. "Blessed Be"
10. "All Naked Women Are Beautiful"
11. "Rainbow"
12. "Dance With a Dragon"
13. "She Xing"
14. (Hidden Track)

== Solo projects and songs by SONA members ==
Beltana included the songs Beltana performed with SONA and several new original songs. She has written additional new songs such as "The Secret", "Ozark Mountain Fire", "Blue", and others.

Joe Credit III, under his own label, Mandolinsanity, produced the CD Everyone Wants to Eat My Mando, which is noted for the song "Sand Dollar Slot Machine" (a.k.a. the "Star Trek" song) and for an extended live version of "Spoon" with saxophone.

Papa Joe's unrecorded and new songs include: "Wedding at Wildwood", "the Gift", "A Year and a Day", and others.
