= Flatonia, Texas =

- Town
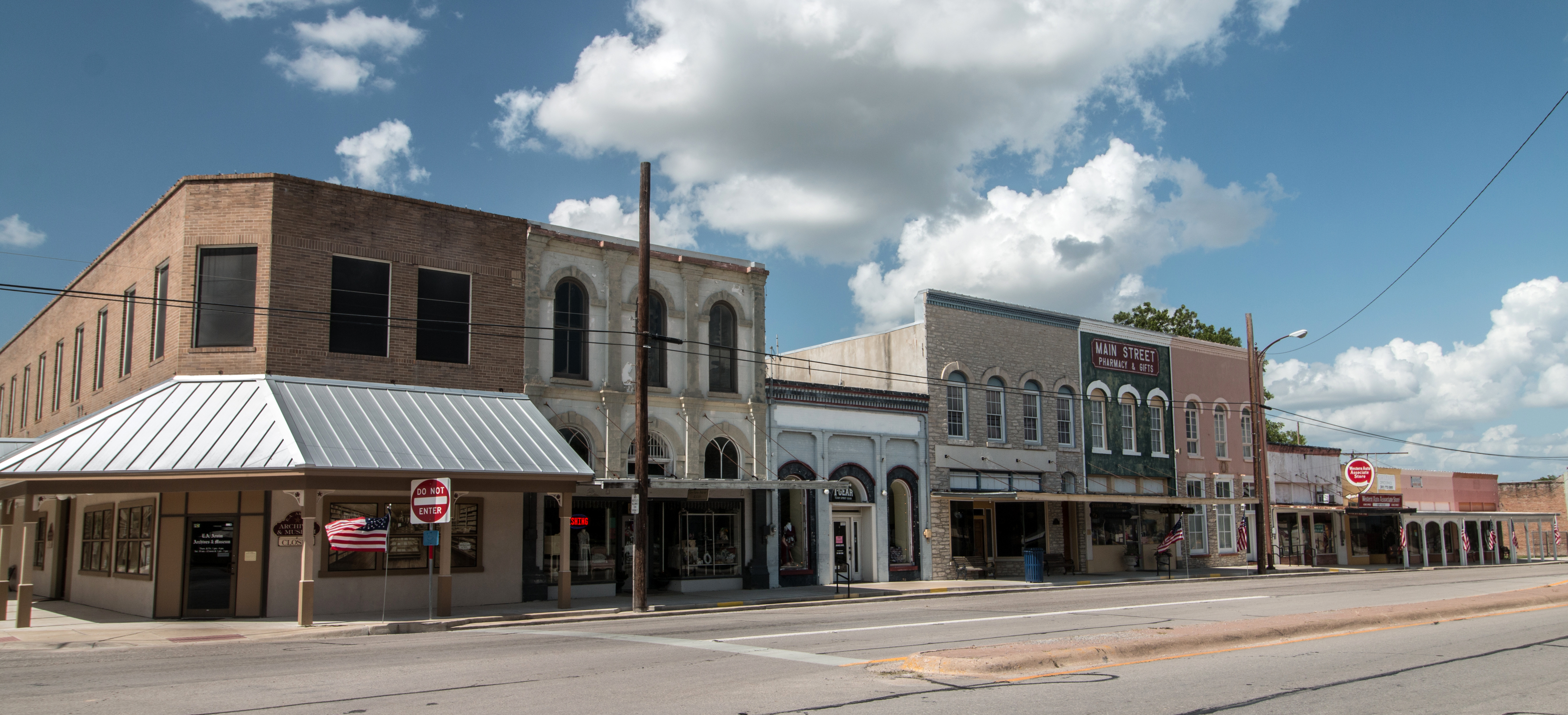
- Downtown Flatonia, Texas
- Motto: "Where All Roads Lead"
- Location of Flatonia, Texas
- Coordinates: 29°41′16″N 97°6′31″W
- Country: United States
- State: Texas
- County: Fayette
- Established: April 8, 1874

Area
  - Total: 1.67 sq mi (4.33 km^{2})
  - Land: 1.65 sq mi (4.28 km^{2})
  - Water: 0.015 sq mi (0.04 km^{2})
- Elevation: 443 ft (135 m)

Population (2020)
  - Total: 1,308
  - Density: 865.1/sq mi (334.02/km^{2})
- Time zone: UTC-6 (Central (CST))
  - Summer (DST): UTC-5 (CDT)
- ZIP code: 78941
- Area code: 361
- FIPS code: 48-26028
- GNIS feature ID: 2412629
- Website: www.flatoniatx.gov

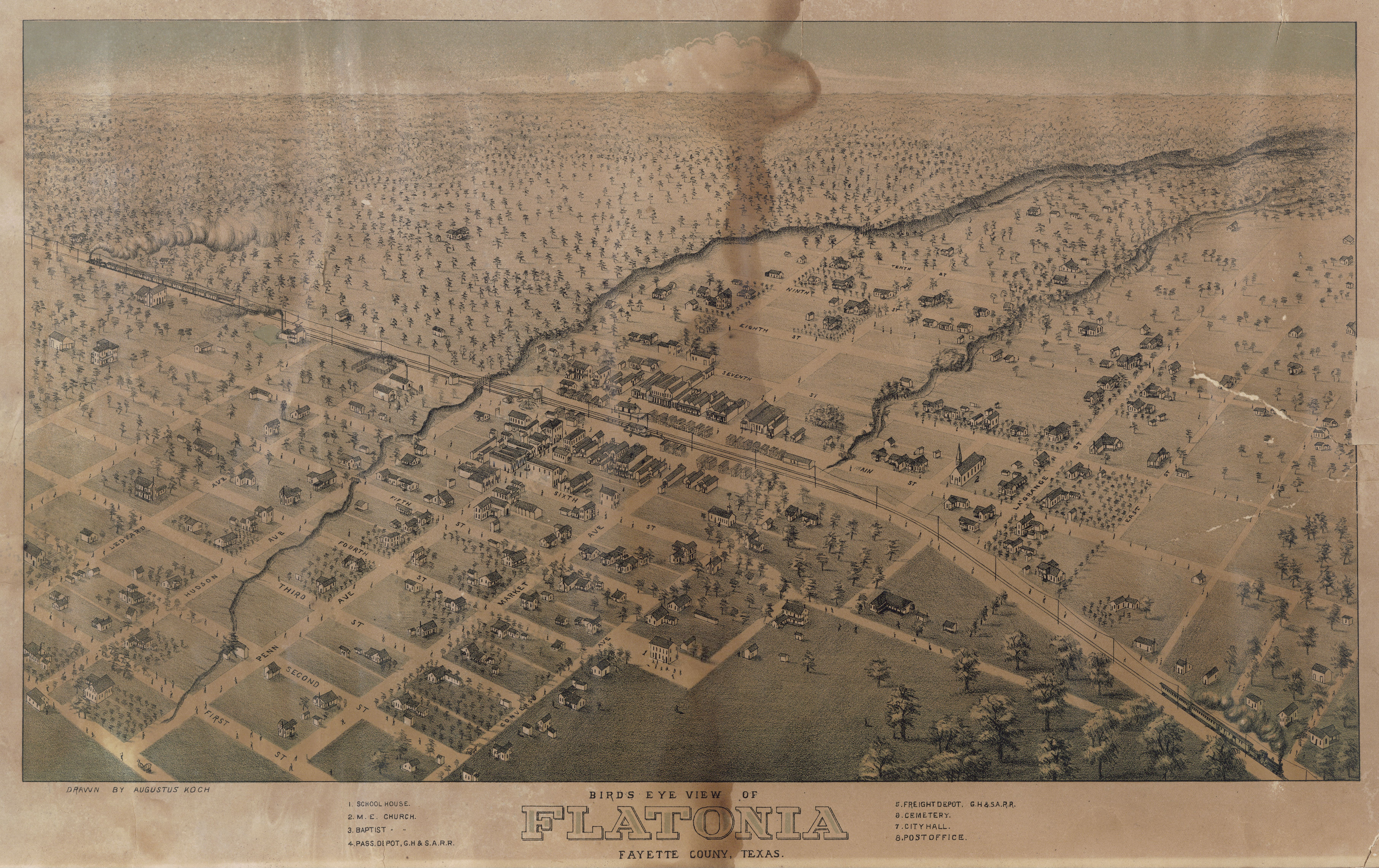
Flatonia in 1881

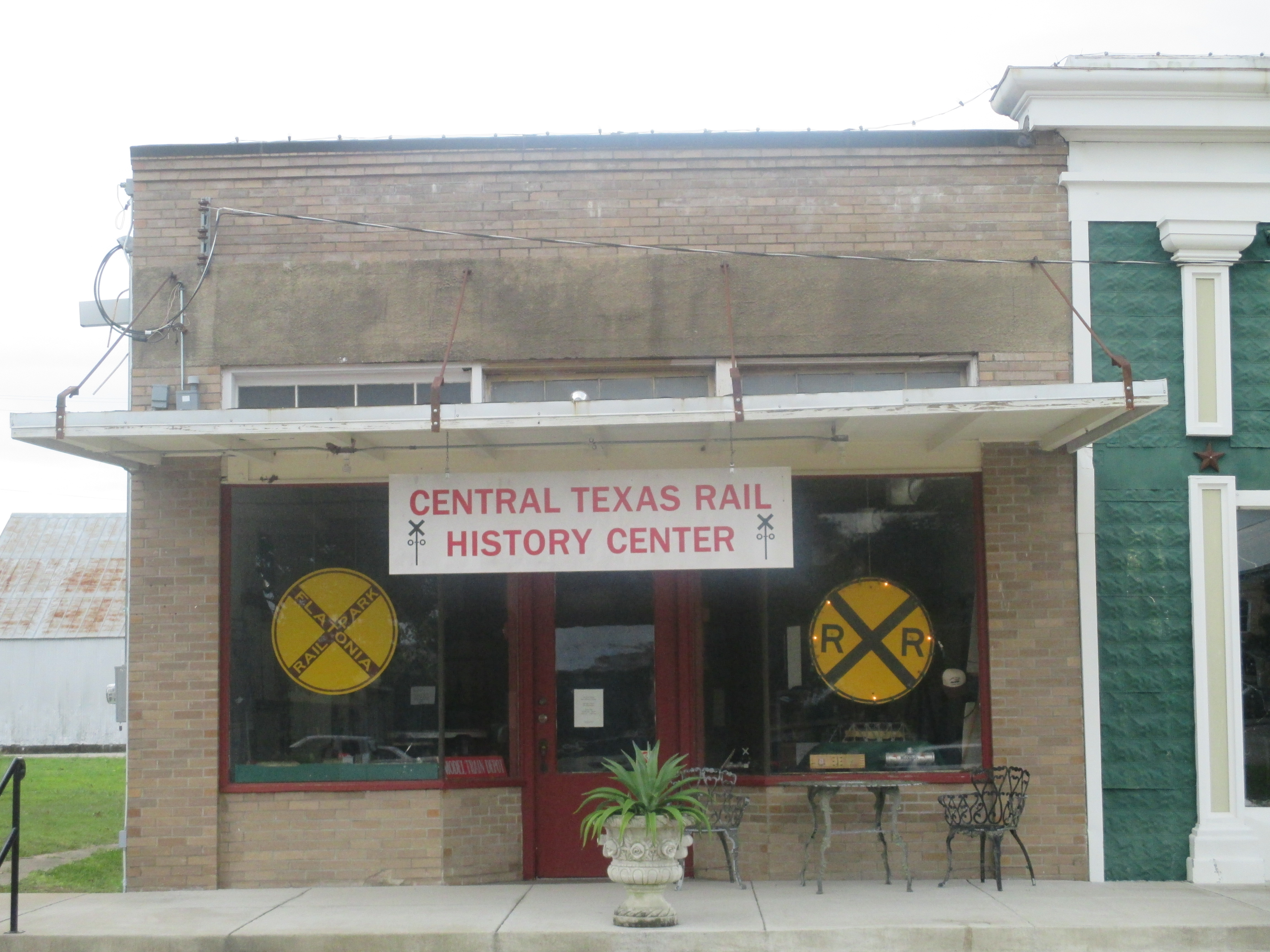
Central Texas Rail History Center in Flatonia

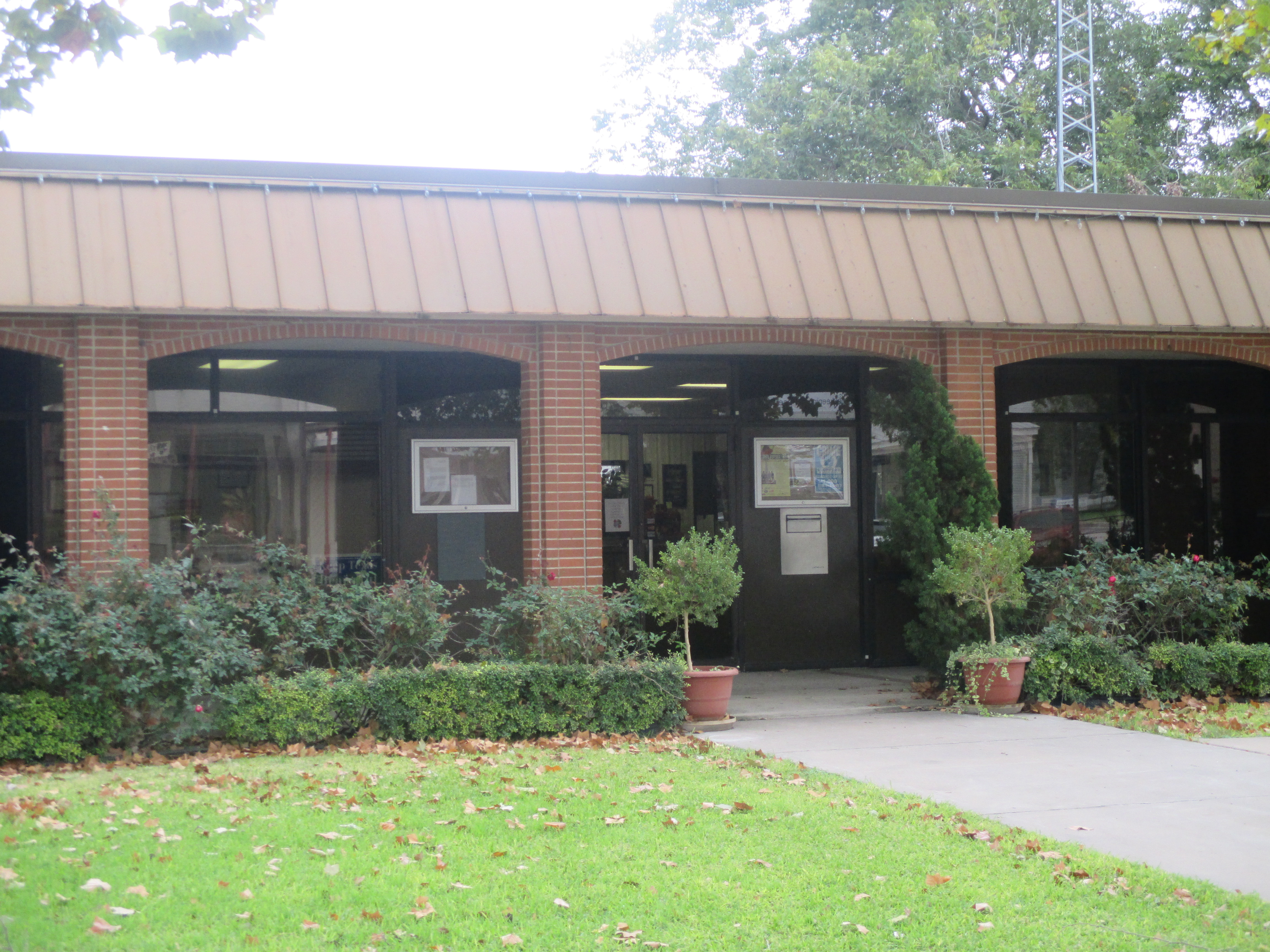
Flatonia City Hall

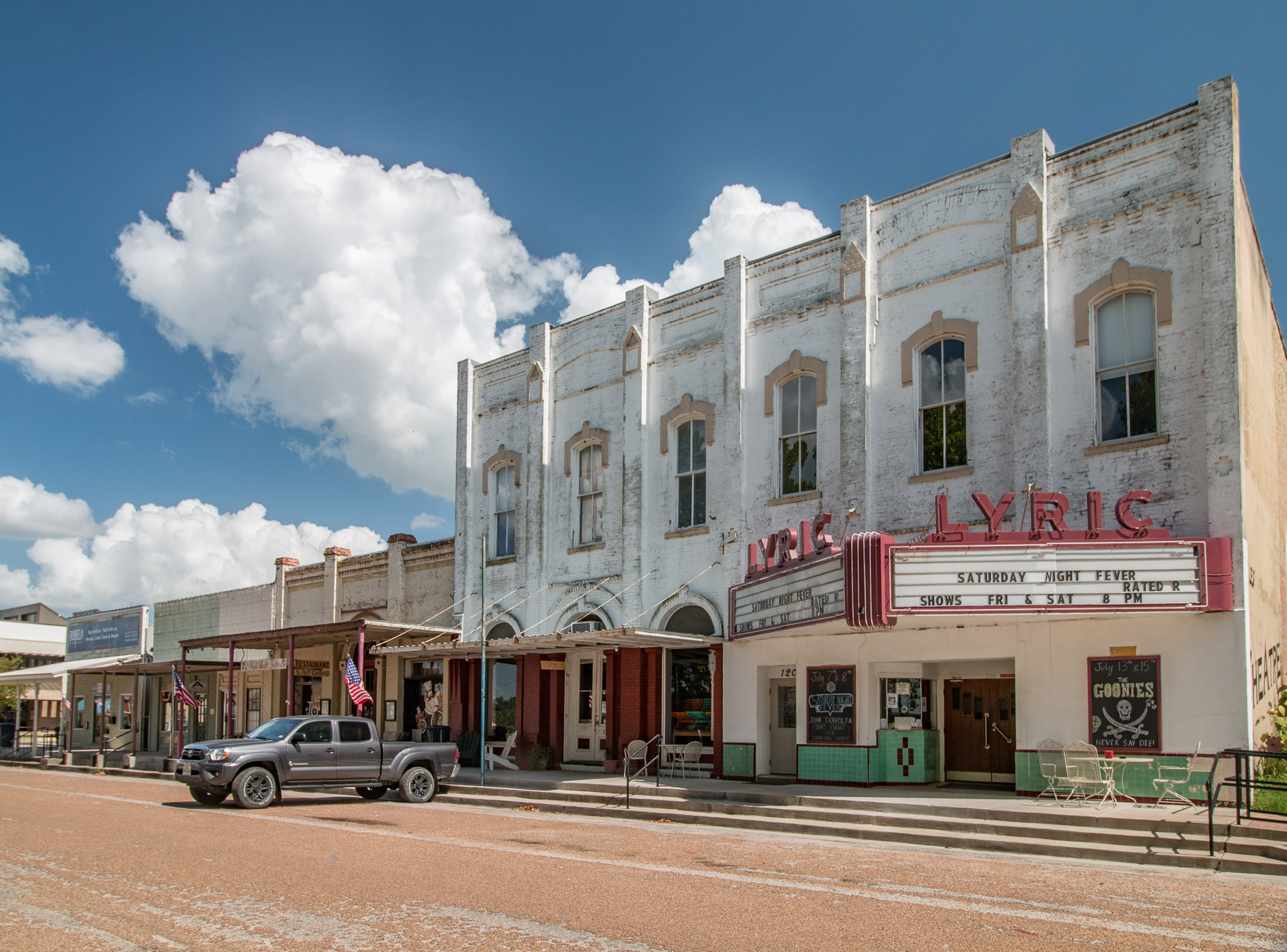
Lyric Theatre in Flatonia

Flatonia is a town in southwestern Fayette County, Texas, United States. Located on Interstate 10 and the Union Pacific Railroad, 12 miles (19 km) west of Schulenburg, the population was 1,308 at the 2020 census.

== History ==
Established on April 8, 1874, on land that the Galveston, Harrisburg and San Antonio Railway acquired from William Alexander Faries (the family name is also spelled "Ferris" and "Farris"), the community was named after F. W. Flato, a local merchant and one of the first settlers, most of whom were Anglo American. Residents placed their homes in the former Flatonia settlement, one mile southeast of the current Flatonia, and in the community of Oso, 3 miles (5 km) northeast, on wagons and moved to the new location. The post office, established in the former Flatonia in 1870, moved to the new Flatonia with the same name. Flatonia was incorporated on November 10, 1875, and held its first election on December 6 of that year. In 1878, the town had 800 residents and an economy dependent on cattle and cotton.

The location of the railway and inexpensive real estate led to the arrival of Arab, Bohemian, German, Greek, and Italian immigrants in several waves. The north-south line of the Waco branch of the San Antonio and Aransas Pass Railway opened in the mid-1880s, leading to new settlements of Muldoon and Moulton. Competition from the settlements, respectively north and south of Flatonia, and an agricultural depression damaged Flatonia's economy. By 1900, Flatonia experienced a significant decline in population.

During the first half of the 20th century, Flatonia's prospects increased and decreased according to the national economy and cattle and cotton markets. In 1950 Flatonia had 1,024 residents, 50 businesses, and a wide farm and ranch service area. By the 1960s, cotton no longer was a substantial aspect of the area economy; therefore many area farms began to ranch cattle. During that time the population was between 1,000 and 1,500. Interstate 10 (I-10) opened in the 1970s, leading many tourist businesses to move from U.S. Highway 90 to I-10, one mile north of Highway 90. In 1985, Flatonia had 69 businesses. In 1990, Flatonia had 1,295 residents.

== Geography ==
Flatonia is located in southwestern Fayette County. U.S. Route 90 passes through the center of town as Main Street, leading east 12 miles (19 km) to Schulenburg and west 12 miles to Waelder. Texas State Highway 95 intersects US 90 in the center of Flatonia, entering from the south as Faires Street and from the north as Penn Street. Highway 95 leads south 19 miles (31 km) to Shiner and north 26 miles (42 km) to Smithville. Interstate 10 passes through the northern side of Flatonia, with access from Exit 661 (Highway 95). I-10 leads east 108 miles (174 km) to Houston and west 90 miles (140 km) to San Antonio.

According to the United States Census Bureau, Flatonia has a total area of 1.6 square miles (4.2 km^{2}), of which 0.02 square miles (0.04 km^{2}), or 1.01%, is water.

=== Climate ===
Flatonia has a humid subtropical climate (Köppen: Cfa) with long, hot and dry summers and mild, wet winters. Summers range in the 90s with a few days in July and August reaching 100. Winters can be chilly but rarely reach below freezing; low winter temperatures are mostly in the fifties or forties. Snow is rare.

Climate data for Flatonia, Texas (4 miles southeast) (1991–2020 normals, extremes 1908–2020)
Month	Jan	Feb	Mar	Apr	May	Jun	Jul	Aug	Sep	Oct	Nov	Dec	Year
Record high °F (°C)	90 (32)	99 (37)	98 (37)	100 (38)	103 (39)	107 (42)	110 (43)	111 (44)	108 (42)	102 (39)	92 (33)	95 (35)	111 (44)
Mean maximum °F (°C)	77.7 (25.4)	81.4 (27.4)	84.7 (29.3)	88.6 (31.4)	92.7 (33.7)	96.4 (35.8)	98.8 (37.1)	99.9 (37.7)	97.0 (36.1)	91.4 (33.0)	84.1 (28.9)	79.4 (26.3)	101.4 (38.6)
Mean daily maximum °F (°C)	62.0 (16.7)	65.9 (18.8)	72.0 (22.2)	78.8 (26.0)	85.1 (29.5)	90.9 (32.7)	94.0 (34.4)	95.0 (35.0)	89.5 (31.9)	81.5 (27.5)	71.2 (21.8)	63.4 (17.4)	79.1 (26.2)
Daily mean °F (°C)	50.9 (10.5)	54.7 (12.6)	60.7 (15.9)	67.9 (19.9)	74.6 (23.7)	80.3 (26.8)	82.7 (28.2)	83.1 (28.4)	78.4 (25.8)	69.9 (21.1)	59.8 (15.4)	52.4 (11.3)	67.9 (19.9)
Mean daily minimum °F (°C)	39.9 (4.4)	43.5 (6.4)	49.4 (9.7)	56.9 (13.8)	64.1 (17.8)	69.7 (20.9)	71.4 (21.9)	71.2 (21.8)	67.2 (19.6)	58.2 (14.6)	48.4 (9.1)	41.5 (5.3)	56.8 (13.8)
Mean minimum °F (°C)	26.9 (−2.8)	30.7 (−0.7)	35.2 (1.8)	44.0 (6.7)	53.6 (12.0)	65.2 (18.4)	68.7 (20.4)	68.1 (20.1)	58.1 (14.5)	44.9 (7.2)	34.1 (1.2)	28.1 (−2.2)	23.8 (−4.6)
Record low °F (°C)	4 (−16)	12 (−11)	18 (−8)	30 (−1)	43 (6)	50 (10)	57 (14)	59 (15)	41 (5)	27 (−3)	19 (−7)	3 (−16)	3 (−16)
Average precipitation inches (mm)	2.80 (71)	2.12 (54)	2.94 (75)	3.31 (84)	4.43 (113)	3.77 (96)	2.05 (52)	2.81 (71)	3.39 (86)	4.40 (112)	3.18 (81)	2.67 (68)	37.87 (962)
Average snowfall inches (cm)	0.0 (0.0)	0.0 (0.0)	0.0 (0.0)	0.0 (0.0)	0.0 (0.0)	0.0 (0.0)	0.0 (0.0)	0.0 (0.0)	0.0 (0.0)	0.0 (0.0)	0.0 (0.0)	0.0 (0.0)	0.0 (0.0)
Average precipitation days (≥ 0.01 in)	8.0	7.6	7.4	6.3	7.4	8.0	5.4	5.8	7.5	6.4	7.1	7.8	84.7
Average snowy days (≥ 0.1 in)	0.0	0.0	0.0	0.0	0.0	0.0	0.0	0.0	0.0	0.0	0.0	0.0	0.0
Source: NOAA

== Demographics ==
Historical population
Census	Pop.	Note	%±
1880	866		—
1890	1,304		50.6%
1900	1,210		−7.2%
1910	886		−26.8%
1920	995		12.3%
1930	966		−2.9%
1940	1,024		6.0%
1950	1,098		7.2%
1960	1,009		−8.1%
1970	1,108		9.8%
1980	1,070		−3.4%
1990	1,295		21.0%
2000	1,377		6.3%
2010	1,383		0.4%
2020	1,308		−5.4%
U.S. Decennial Census

Flatonia racial composition as of 2020 (NH = Non-Hispanic) (Note: Note: the US Census treats Hispanic/Latino as an ethnic category. This table excludes Latinos from the racial categories and assigns them to a separate category. Hispanics/Latinos can be of any race.)
Race	Number	Percentage
White (NH)	514	39.3%
Black or African American (NH)	59	4.51%
Native American or Alaska Native (NH)	4	0.31%
Asian (NH)	7	0.54%
Some Other Race (NH)	2	0.15%
Mixed/Multi-Racial (NH)	17	1.3%
Hispanic or Latino	705	53.9%
Total	1,308	

As of the 2020 United States census, there were 1,308 people, 496 households, and 412 families residing in the town.

As of the census of 2000, there were 1,377 people, 504 households, and 347 families residing in the town. The population density was 850.8 inhabitants per square mile (328.5/km^{2}). There were 568 housing units at an average density of 350.9 per square mile (135.5/km^{2}). The racial makeup of the town was 74.07% White, 7.48% African American, 0.94% Native American, 16.85% from other races, and 0.65% from two or more races. Hispanic or Latino of any race were 36.17% of the population.

There were 504 households, out of which 33.3% had children under the age of 18 living with them, 52.4% were married couples living together, 11.9% had a female householder with no husband present, and 31.0% were non-families. 27.4% of all households were made up of individuals, and 15.1% had someone living alone who was 65 years of age or older. The average household size was 2.62 and the average family size was 3.21.

In the town, the population was spread out, with 26.9% under the age of 18, 8.2% from 18 to 24, 25.4% from 25 to 44, 20.5% from 45 to 64, and 19.0% who were 65 years of age or older. The median age was 38 years. For every 100 females, there were 98.4 males. For every 100 females age 18 and over, there were 91.8 males.

The median income for a household in the town was $27,000, and the median income for a family was $31,471. Males had a median income of $23,700 versus $16,429 for females. The per capita income for the town was $12,329. About 18.9% of families and 23.4% of the population were below the poverty line, including 33.4% of those under age 18 and 27.4% of those age 65 or over.

== Arts and culture ==
=== Annual cultural events ===
Many residents of Flatonia are of Czech, Slovak, German, or other Central European heritage. The local "Czhilispiel" festival is named for Czech people and their popular chili.

=== Museums and other points of interest ===
The abandoned Flatonia Railroad Tower, in use from 1902 to 1996, was one of Texas' longest standing, manually operated railroad switching towers with north-south and east-west cross rails. The tower was damaged in an automobile accident on January 9, 2014.

The E. A. Arnim Archives and Museum has a collection of antique furniture, household items, clothing and historical documents used by the early settlers of Flatonia. There is a livery stable behind the museum with wagons, buggies, and vintage tack and farm implements.

== Education ==
The town is served by the Flatonia Independent School District. Campuses include the Flatonia Elementary School and Flatonia Secondary School.

== Photo gallery ==
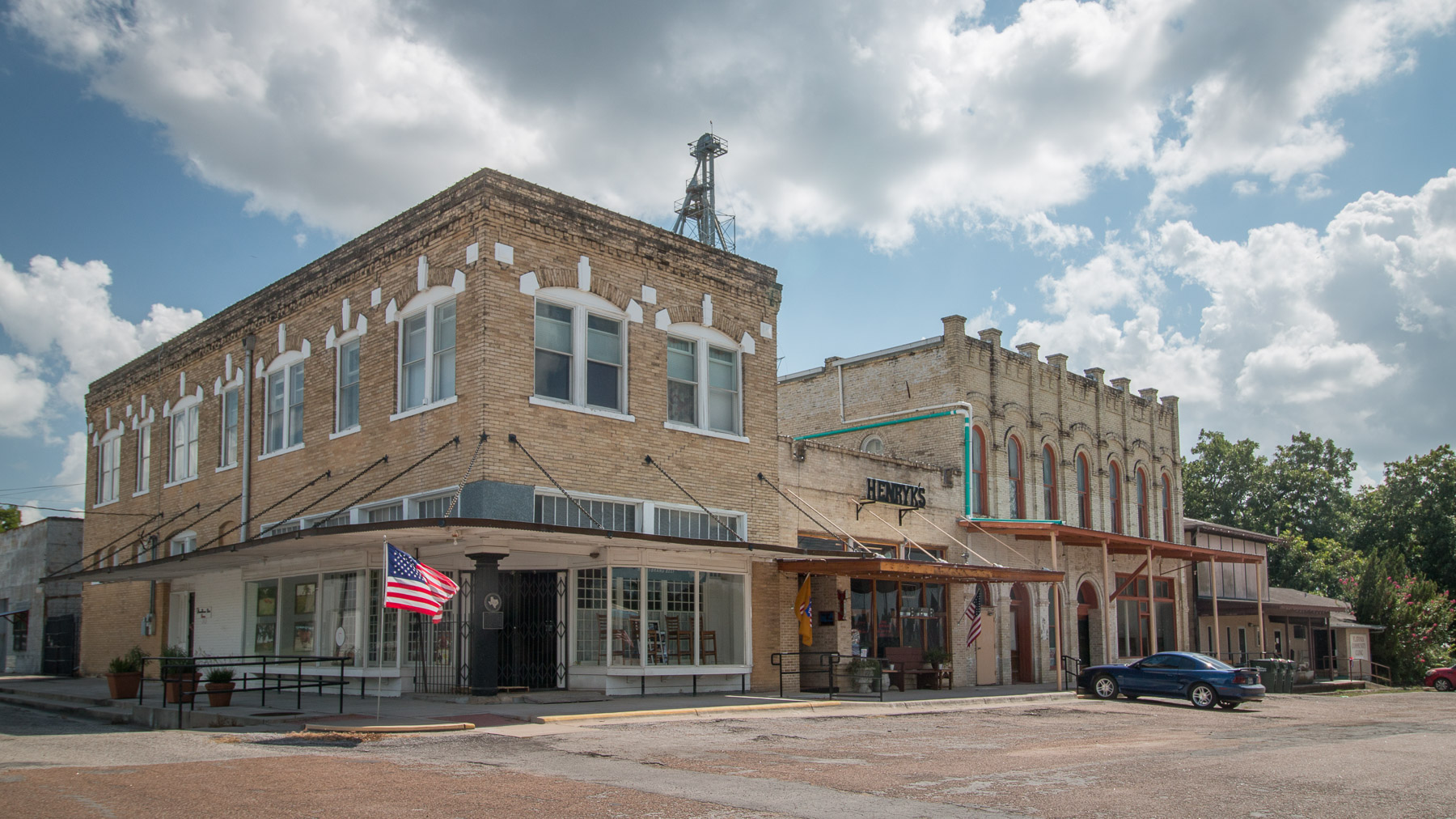
Downtown Flatonia

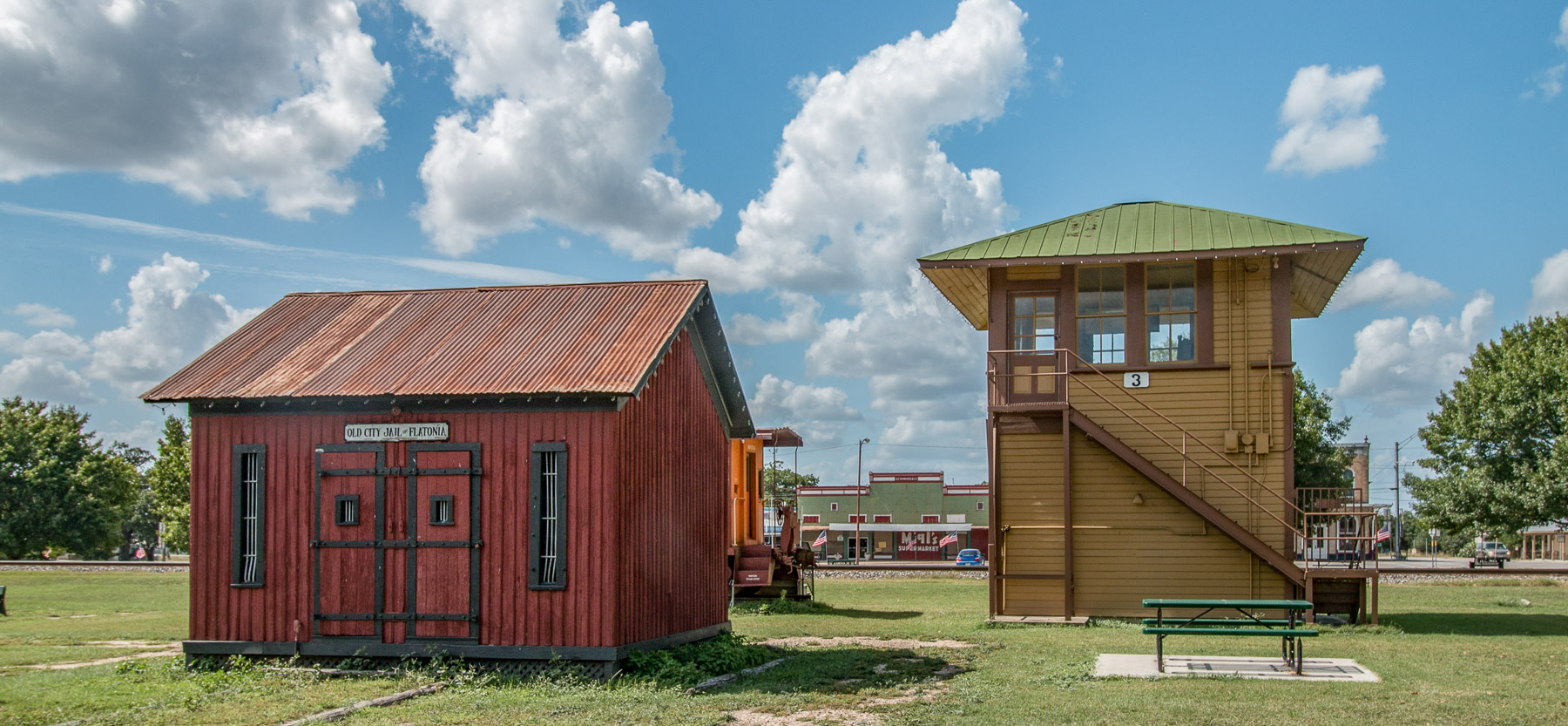
Flatonia Tower No.3

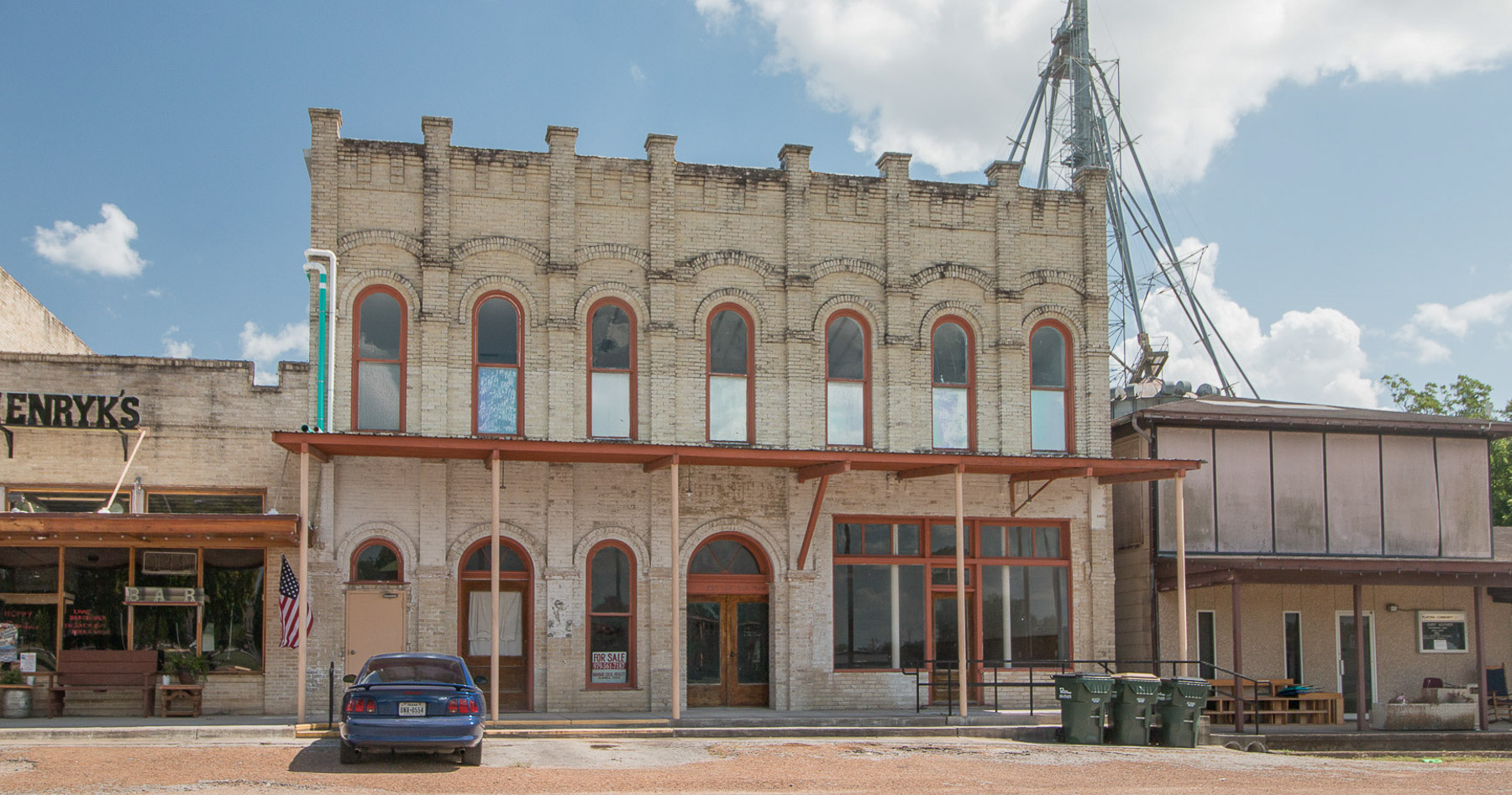
Downtown Flatonia

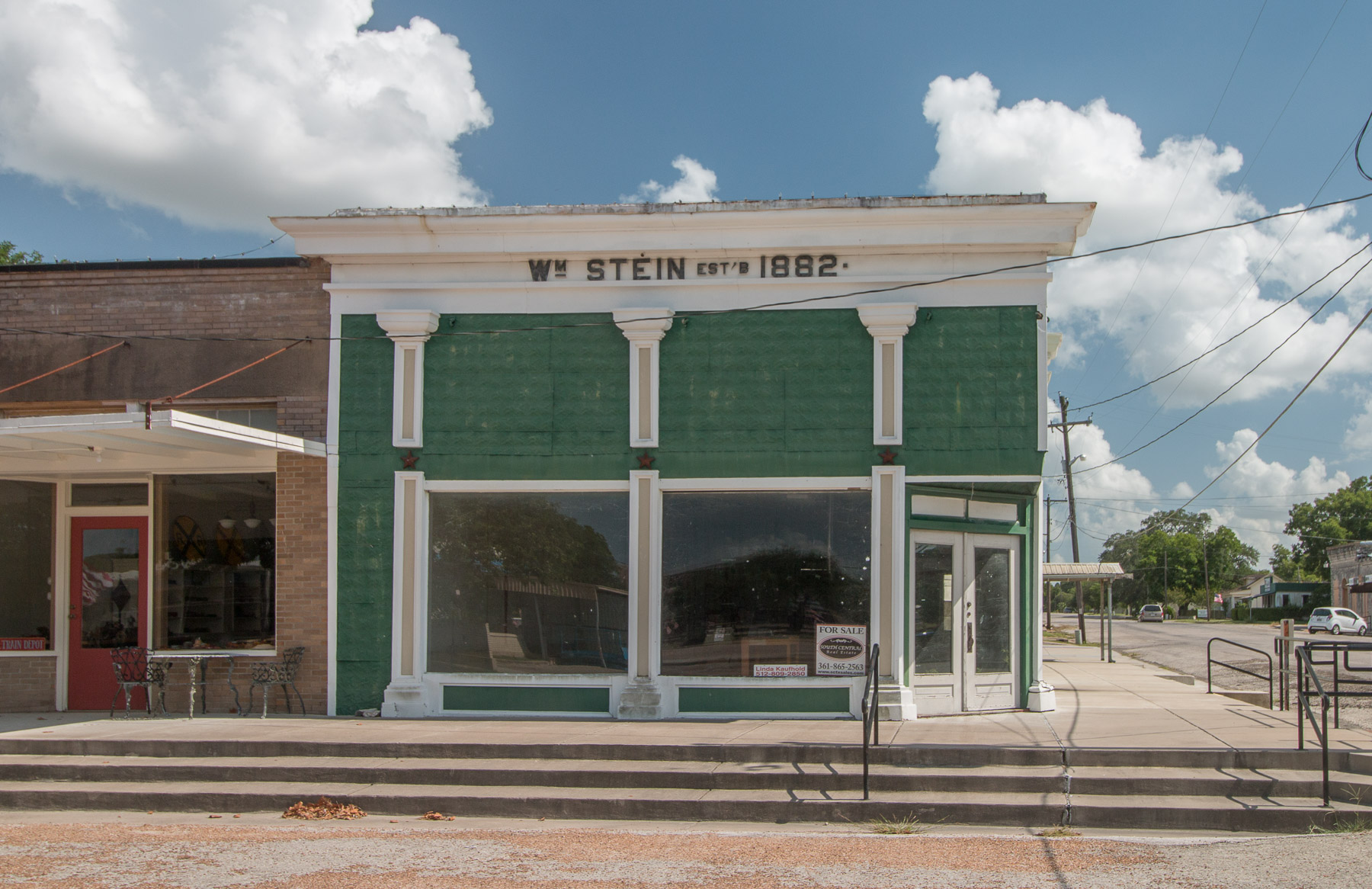
William Stein Building

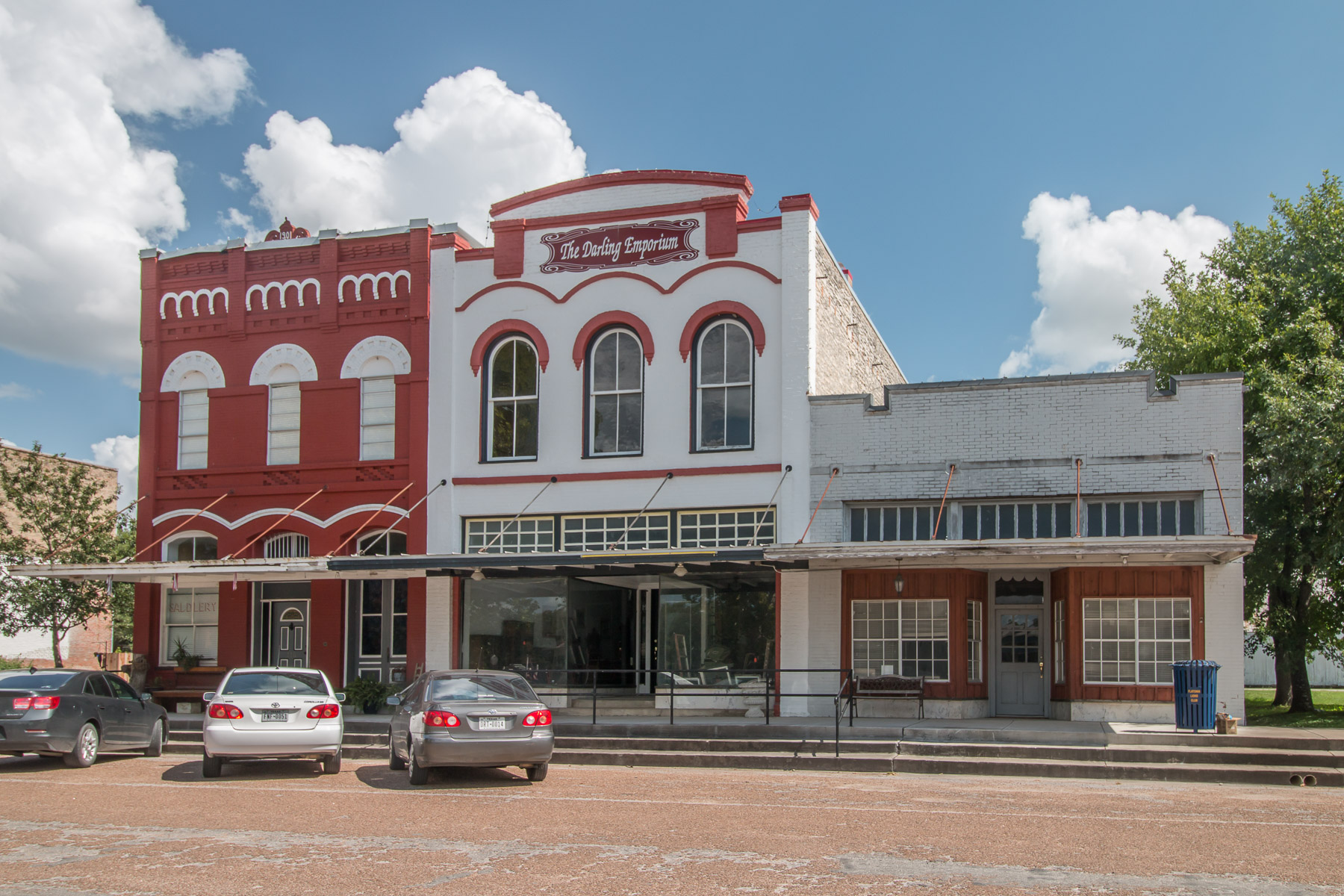
Downtown Flatonia

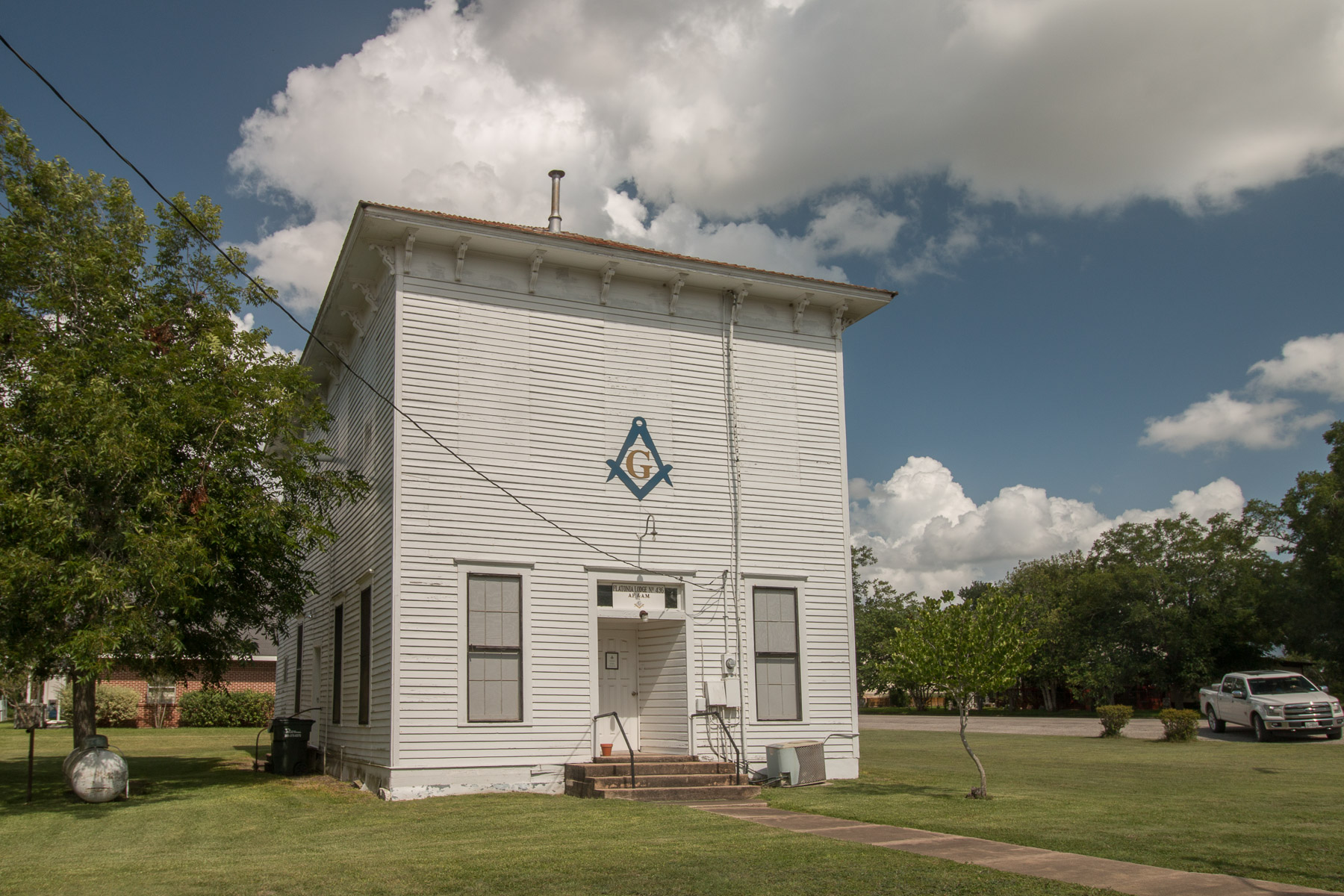
Flatonia Masonic Lodge

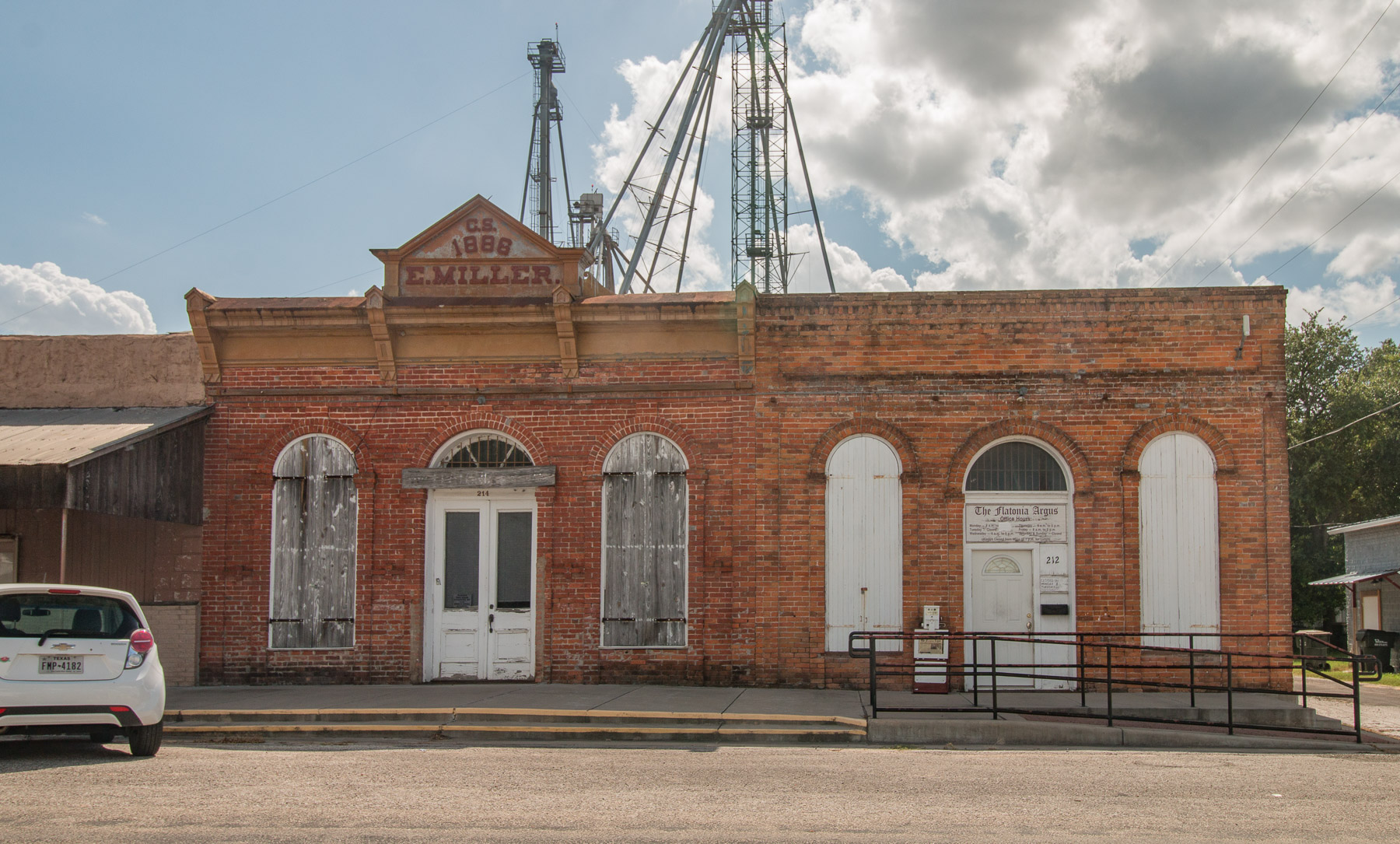
Miller Building

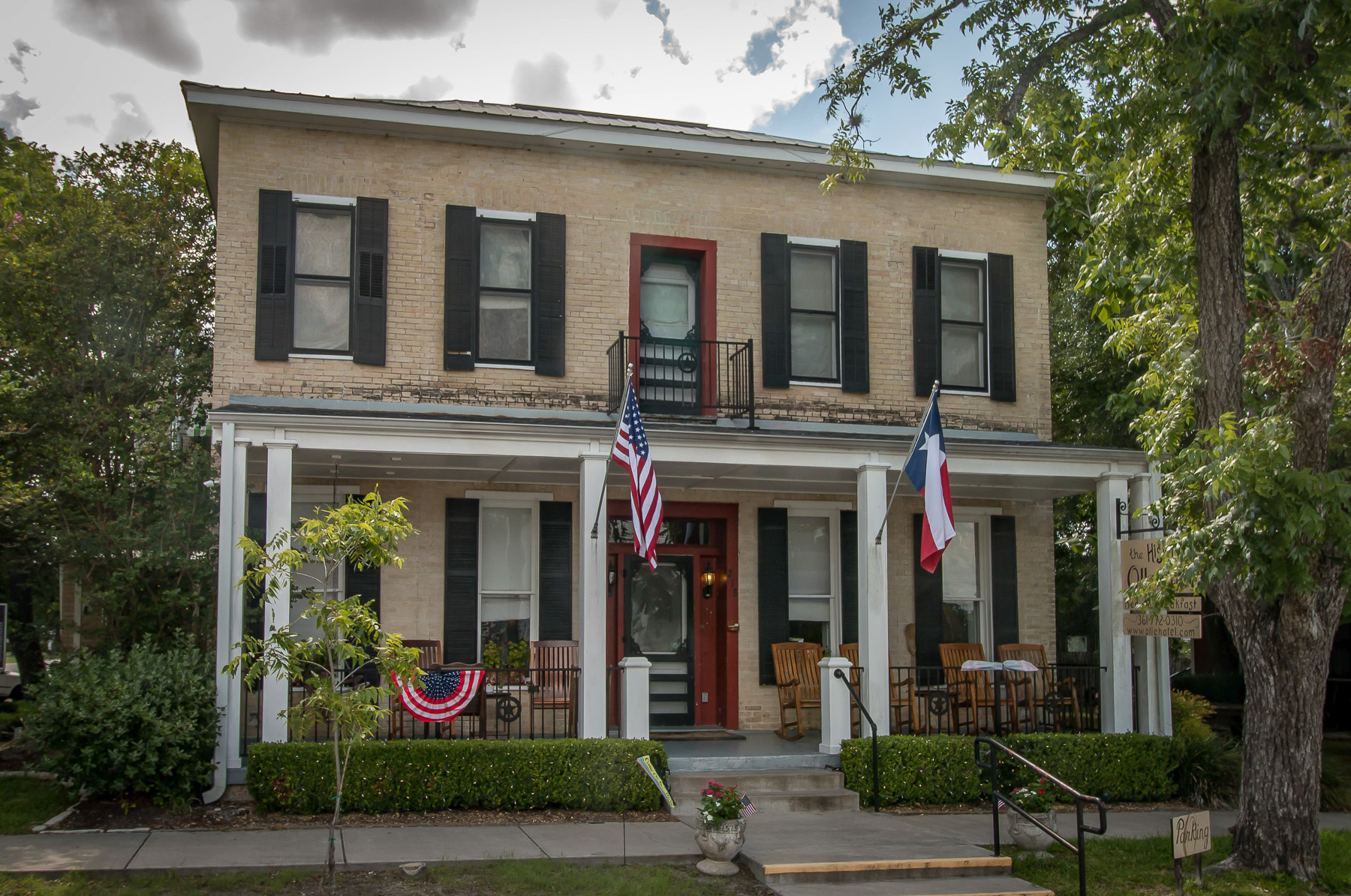
Olle Hotel

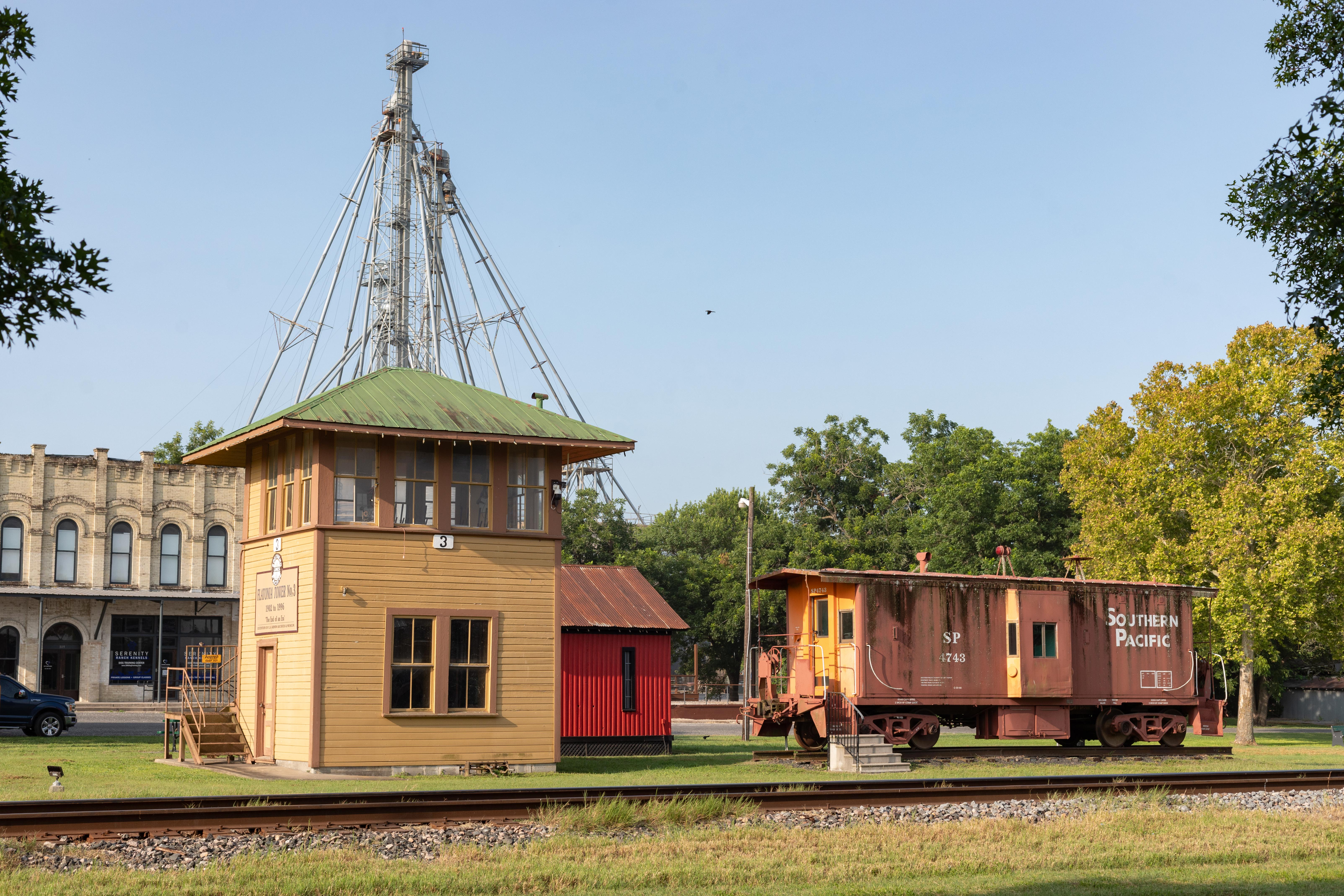
Tower #3 and Caboose
