= List of neo-pagan festivals and events =

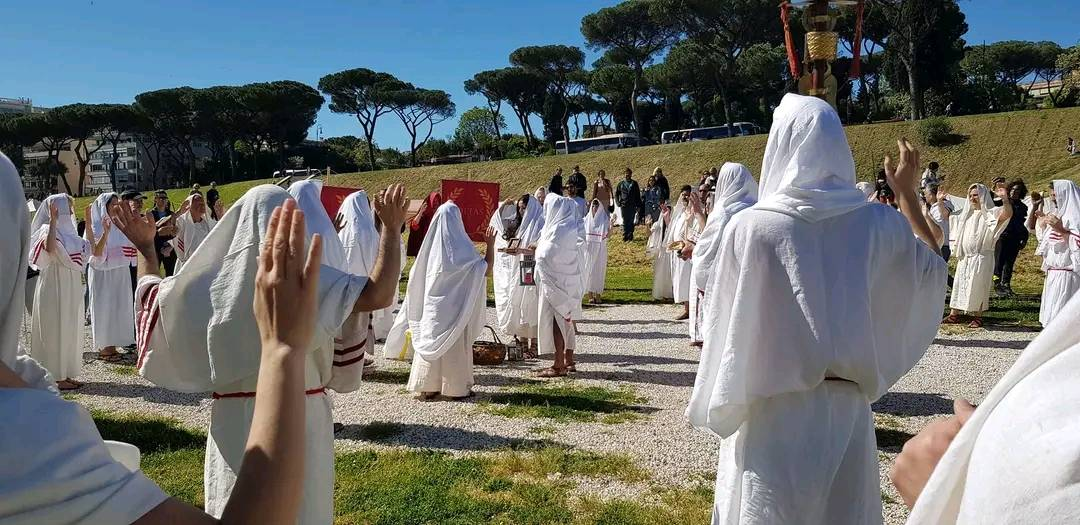
Celebration of the 2777th Natale di Roma at the Circus Maximus

Events organized for, or largely attended by, members of Neopagan spiritual paths: often planned around the Wheel of the Year or coinciding with adjacent phases of the Moon.

== Ongoing ==
- Free Spirit Gathering, since 1985
- Hekate's Sickle Festival, since 1989
- Kaleidoscope Gathering, since 1995, hosted at Raven's Knoll campground
- Mėnuo Juodaragis, since 1995
- Pagan Pride Day, held annually at many locations
- Pagan Spirit Gathering, since 1980
- Paganicon, since 2011
- Pan Pagan Festival, since 1976
- Natale di Roma, a festival linked to the foundation of Rome, gained popularity over the last 20 years
- Spring Mysteries Festival, since 1986
- Sirius Rising, since 1994
- Spirit Haven, since 1980
- Starwood Festival, since 1981
- Wellspring Gathering, since 1991

== Defunct ==
- Beltania, final gathering in 2019
- Faerieworlds, 2005-2022
- Gnosticon, final gathering in 1976
- PantheaCon, 1994–2020

== See also ==
- Pagan festivals in the United States
- Lists of festivals – list articles on Wikipedia
- List of modern pagan temples
- Transformational festival
