= Pan Pagan Festival =

The Pan Pagan Festival (PPF) is one of the United States's first and longest running nature spirituality festivals, organized by the Midwest Pagan Council that spans from Wednesday through Sunday in late July or early August each year. The first Pan Pagan festival was held in 1976 as a way of bringing different groups together to share knowledge and experience. The festival grew each year until 1980 which was the largest Pagan gathering ever held up to that time, with an attendance of almost 600, including Raymond Buckland, Isaac Bonewits, Z Budapest, Herman Slater, Prudence Priest, Margot Adler, and Selena Fox. From the Pan Pagan Festival other festivals grew including Circle's Pagan Spirit Gathering and Chrysalis Moon.

== Rituals and events ==
There are three rituals that are perennial to the Pan Pagan Festival:

- Opening Ritual — Wednesday afternoon
- Main Ritual — Saturday evening
- Closing Rituals — Sunday afternoon

PPF caters to people of all ages, with activities ranging from crafts and scavenger hunts for children, teens, and young elders, to workshops on herbs, crystals, and home remedies. Regular events include:

- Opening Ritual, the only thing scheduled for Wednesday, to give attendees time to arrive and relax as they set up their tents and settle in.
- Town Meeting, held every morning of the fest.
- Meet & Greet, held Thursday night; everyone introduces themselves, the council supplies limited amounts of beer, wine, and soda as well as snacks to encourage mingling.
- The Annual Duck Races, held Friday morning.
- The Follies, a talent show held Friday night.
- Scavenger Hunt for kids, held Saturday morning, with prizes.
- Auction & Raffle, Saturday late afternoon; each vendor is asked to donate one item from their shop, and other attendees may donate items as well. All money raised goes to the MPC to help offset the costs of holding next year's PPF.
- Feast, held Saturday night, the council supplies an assortment of food.
- Main Ritual, Saturday night, ending with a bonfire; drumming and dancing take place after the bonfire has been lit.
- Closing Ritual, held Sunday afternoon.

== Locations and themes ==
Each year Pan Pagan Festival has a theme, which helps to give coherence to artwork and activities.

- PPF 2022 held at a campground near French Lick, IN — Out of the Darkness, Into the Light
- PPF 2021 held virtually as a one-day festival
- PPF 44 (2020) postponed due to Pandemic
- PPF 43 (2019) held at a campground near Knox, IN — Magick Happens
- PPF 42 (2018) held at a campground near Knox, IN — Walking the Path of the Ancients
- PPF 41 (2017) held at a campground near Knox, IN — The Beat goes On and On
- PPF 40 (2016) held at a campground near Knox, IN — Changing, Growing, Renewing
- PPF 39 (2015) held at a campground near Knox, IN — Open Spirits, Open Hearts
- PPF 38 (2014) held at a campground near Knox, IN — Bringing Old and New Together
- PPF 37 (2013) held at a campground near Knox, IN — An Elemental Connection
- PPF 36 (2012) held at a campground near Knox, IN — Creating Sacred Spaces
- PPF 35 (2011) held at a campground near Knox, IN — Dancing with Pan
- PPF 34 (2010) held at a campground near Knox, IN — Sharing Traditions, As One!
- PPF 33 (2009) held at a campground near Knox, IN — Community Starts Here!
- PPF 32 (2008) held at a campground near Knox, IN — Share The Labor, Share The Love!
- PPF 31 (2007) held at a campground near Knox, IN — Around The Wheel & Back Again
- PPF 30 (2006) held at a campground near Knox, IN — 30 Years Of Growth
- PPF 29 (2005) held at a campground near Knox, IN — Strength Through Diversity
- PPF 28 (2004) held at a campground near Knox, IN — Unity Through Diversity
- PPF 27 (2003) held at 3-D Campground in Indiana — We Make A Bountiful Harvest
- PPF 26 (2002) held at 3-D Campground in Indiana — Caretakers Of The Garden
- PPF 25 (2001) held at 3-D Campground in Indiana — 25 Magickal Years
- PPF 24 (2000) held at 3-D Campground in Indiana — Flowing Forever Forward
- PPF 23 (1999) held at 3-D Campground in Indiana — We Dream The Future
- PPF 22 (1998) held at MPC Land in Indiana — Harmony Through Family
- PPF-21 (1997) held at MPC Land in Indiana — From The Goddess Into Our Care, This Land Is Ours
- PPF-20 (1996) held at Timber Trails Campground in Indiana — Making Pagan History
- PPF 19 (1995) held at Timber Trails Campground in Indiana — We Make The Magick Come Alive
- PPF 18 (1994) held at Timber Trails Campground in Indiana — Realize A Bright Tomorrow Thru Our Ties With The Past
- PPF 17 (1993) held at Timber Trails Campground in Indiana — From Times Beginning To Times End, Our Circles Always Blend
- PPF 16 (1992) held at Timber Trails Campground in Indiana — Blossoming Forth With Love
- PPF 15 (1991) held at Timber Trails Campground in Indiana — Regenerated And Growing Anew
- PPF 14 (1990) held at Campground in Yorkville, Illinois — To/Gather, Again
- PPF 13 (1989) held at Circle Pines in Kalamazoo, Michigan
- PPF 12 (1988) held at Circle Pines in Kalamazoo, Michigan
- PPF 11 (1987) held at Lake Eliza in Indiana
- PPF 10 (1986) held at Lake Eliza in Indiana — We've Come A Long Way Lady, 10 Years Young And Growing
- PPF 9 (1985) held at Lake Eliza in Indiana — Life Is Unity Is Life
