= Pagan activism =

Pagan activism may refer to:

- Reclaiming (Neopaganism)
- Pagan Pride
