= Beltania =

Yearly festival held in Colorado

Beltania is an alternative festival held each year in Colorado. Approximately 450–750 attendees come to celebrate Beltane, also known as May Day. It is a musicfest with several days of diverse performances and also a spiritual retreat focusing on Earth consciousness and the modern nature-based spirituality movement.

Beltane has been celebrated for millennia and dates back to pre-Christian Celtic times, and is a fire festival celebrating the bright half of the year. Traditionally, the Balefire is lit to signal the return of the sun's strength, and people dance around the maypole which symbolizes fertility. There's a lot more to the history, lore, activities, and symbology of Beltane, but Beltania is not designed to reenact or recreate ancient Pagan ways. Rather, it's a modern celebration and interpretation of this May Day tradition. Spiritual and religious rituals and ceremonies of a wide variety of Earth-honoring, Magickal, Metaphysical, or other Alternative traditions are represented at Beltania, including a sweat lodge, labyrinth walk, yoga, as well as eclectic and traditional ritual.

Since 2008, when the festival was founded by Joy Burton of Living Earth, a Denver, Colorado–based nonprofit, several nationally and internationally known guests and performers have headlined at Beltania:

- Selena Fox of Circle Sanctuary
- Janet Farrar and Gavin Bone
- Christopher Penczak
- S. J. Tucker
- Wendy Rule
- River and Joyce Higginbotham
- Betsy Tinney
- Lunar Fire
- Frenchy and the Punk

In 2009, a Guinness Book of World Records attempt was made for the largest maypole dance on Earth, with 196 ribbons. Ordinarily, a 20–30 foot tall maypole at Beltania includes 50-100 ribbons and is repeatedly the largest maypole dance in Colorado.

Throughout the festival, ceremonies are interspersed with workshops with special guest presenters and many local talented teachers, ritualists, and local/regional community leaders. Music performances run Friday and Saturday all day and into the evening. Trance drumming, ecstatic dancing, and chanting takes place throughout the festival and until the early morning hours. The "Green Man" and "May Queen" are crowned each year as a symbol of the masculine and feminine aspects of the Divine. A Rainbow Welcome Center hosts and celebrates the diversity of the LGBT community at Beltania.

Beltania is the main annual fundraiser event for Living Earth, a nonprofit church in Denver, Colorado. Joy Burton is the festival's Executive Director and the Executive Director of Living Earth. From 2010 to 2017 Living Earth partnered in hosting Beltania with Northern Colorado Covenant of the River (a.k.a. NCCR).

In 2019 the Beltania Festival announced that it would be their last year of operations.
