= The Moon is Green =

- Short story by Fritz Leiber
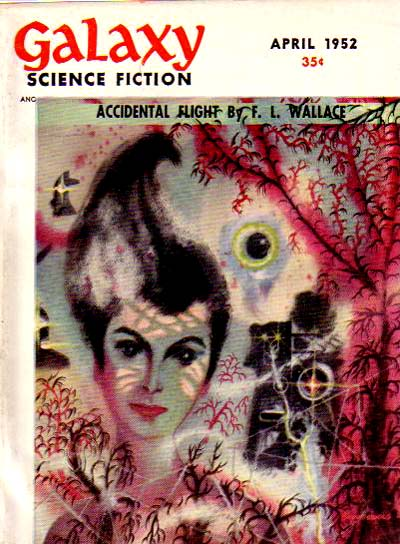
- Cover of Galaxy
- Country: USA
- Language: English
- Genre: Science fiction

Publication
- Published in: Galaxy
- Publisher: World Editions
- Publication date: April 1952

"The Moon is Green" is a science fiction short story by Fritz Leiber. It was first published in Galaxy in April 1952, and has appeared in several collections since then. It was adapted as a radio play for X Minus One in 1957, and a television episode in 2014.

== Plot summary ==
Effie is trapped in a house with her husband Hank, an "angry, stale little man", due to the lingering radioactive dust from a nuclear war using cobalt bombs. A limited war went on for years with both sides carefully controlling their bombing to stay below the lethal radiation threshold. When, by accident, they tripped over the point of no return, all of the forces launched their remaining weapons in "the Fury". Those that survived did so in caverns, where whole societies were built. It is only now, years later, that one can live at ground level, albeit in a heavily lead-shielded and air-filtered home.

Hank berates Effie for her unwise decision to open the shutters for a moment to look at the green-colored moon. She closes the shutters and checks herself with a Geiger counter. Hank is further maddened when it "goes off" near her waist, but this turns out to be due to a radium-painted wristwatch in her pocket. It is revealed that Effie is pregnant, which Hank believes has led to a recent promotion and will continue to improve their social status over time. He is further angered when she refuses to go to a public dinner where his promotion will be made public. She persuades him to go alone.

As soon as he leaves, Effie returns to the window where she is greeted by a man living outside. He enters through the window, and in return for food, he tells her his name is Patrick and talks of the new Garden of Eden that emerged due to the mutations caused by the radiation. Hank returns early, mentioning he was aware Effie was carrying on an affair and he had realized the radium watch was a ruse to disguise the radioactive fetus. Patrick denies any affair, and Hank argues with him.

Effie becomes increasingly desperate to leave the house. She states that Patrick's survival proves the dust is no longer radioactive. This is disproven when the Geiger counter, the "ultimate arbiter of truth in the 20th century", goes off the scale when Hank measures Patrick. Patrick comes clean; the stories of the garden of Eden are simply a seduction technique that has worked for him in the past. The revelation drives Effie insane; she leaps out the window and runs off. Patrick chases after her, while Hank simply returns into his home and locks the window behind him.

== Publication ==
First published in Galaxy in 1952, it was selected for collection in 1953's "The Best Science-Fiction Stories" and again for the Fourth Series in 1955. It first appeared in an anthology of Leiber's works in 1968's "The Secret Songs", and then in a number of following Leiber collections.

The story was adapted for radio by X Minus One and first broadcast on 2 January 1957. Many years later it was adapted for television's Suspense series, first broadcast on 8 July 2016.

== Reception ==
The Moon is Green is used as an example of a specific period in Leiber's writing. While the story is ostensibly an example of the post-apocalyptic short story that was common in the 1950s, its underlying theme is based on an examination of women's roles in storytelling. In 1949, Leiber read Robert Graves' Seven Days in New Crete, based on Graves' earlier work, The White Goddess. Leiber became uncomfortable with Graves' treatment of female stereotypes in these works, and began to publish a series of works that inverted these themes to show women not as irrational by nature, but driven so by male-dominated societies and masculine bias. Examples of similar themes are seen in "The Mechanical Bride" and "Poor Superman". After a bout with alcoholism, Leiber returned to the topic in "The Big Time".
