= Circle Sanctuary =

U.S. non-profit organization and church

- Formation: 1974
- Type: New religious movement, Wicca
- Headquarters: Wisconsin, US
- Founders: Selena Fox, Jim Alan
- Website: www.circlesanctuary.org

Circle Sanctuary is a non-profit organization and legally recognized neopagan church based in southwestern Wisconsin. It aims to encourage community celebrations, spiritual healing, research, networking and education.

Circle Sanctuary was founded in 1974 by Selena Fox, and sponsors gatherings and encourages nature conservation, nature meditations and workshops at a range of locations, with the primary site being a 200-acre (0.81 km^{2}) site near Mount Horeb, Wisconsin, set in forested hills. Circle Sanctuary's land is fully owned by Circle Sanctuary Inc., a 501(c)(3) non-profit.

The organization has been prominent in the campaign to permit the pentacle to be displayed on the gravestones of Wiccan members of the U.S. military, and Selena Fox was one of the plaintiffs in the successful action to obtain this permission. Nine of the gravestones are displayed at the Sanctuary's cemetery at Barneveld, Wisconsin, about 25 miles (40 km) west of Madison.

== Overview ==
Since its creation in 1974, Circle Sanctuary has provided support to neopagans in several ways, chiefly as a networking resource. For many years, Circle was the only national networking resource available to most neopagans, especially those who were not located in major cities with large pagan or neopagan populations (such as New York City, Chicago, and San Francisco). Circle Network News, originally a newspaper-like quarterly and now a quarterly magazine, provided a method for pagans in less populated areas to find others of like mind. Networking support remains one of Circle's core functions.

Circle sponsors many gatherings, the best-known of which is the Pagan Spirit Gathering, held annually at Litha (Midsummer). Other major festivals on Circle Sanctuary land include Beltane (near May 1), Green Spirit (Lughnasadh, around August 1) and Samhain (around October 31). Additional smaller gatherings, classes and celebrations are held year round.

Circle has 26 active ministers who perform community support and passage rite work throughout the United States.

== History ==
Founded in 1974 by Selena Fox and Jim Alan, Circle's first public event was a Yule ritual hosted at the couple's home in Madison, Wisconsin. The following year, Circle moved to a farm in Sun Prairie, Wisconsin (just outside Madison). In 1978, a favorable article written by Jacqueline Mitchard appeared in The Capital Times, which marked the beginning of Circle's public outreach. The same year, Fox and Alan began hosting a Thursday night, weekly half-hour radio program called Circle Magic on 89.7 FM WORT in Madison and a television show Magick Circle [sic] on cable 4; the radio program ran for four years.

1978 was a pivotal year for Circle. Incorporated as a Wiccan Church in Wisconsin on October 27, 1978, the organization's legal name was changed to "Church of Circle Wicca, Inc." Circle's original coven structure was replaced with a church structure, including a board of directors and ordained ministers. Fox and Alan released a tape entitled Circle Magick Music, one of the first neopagan music collections to be widely distributed. They also published a paperback collection of music in Circle Magic Songs. A weekly, hour-long cable television show was added on Cable 4 of Madison. The following year, Circle was featured in Time magazine on the Religion page, in an article about a handfasting the couple performed at the third Pan Pagan Festival at Demotte, Indiana.

In 1979 Jim Alan and Selena Fox began working with the Chameleon Club, a Cleveland, Ohio-based group. They hosted several appearances at Case Western Reserve University and other Cleveland venues, and on the ABC television talk shows Morning Exchange and Live on Five. Circle helped launch the first Starwood Festival in 1981, just one month after the first Pagan Spirit Gathering.

In 1980, Circle received federal recognition as a church, and moved to another rented farm in Black Earth, Wisconsin. The first Litha gathering was held, a precursor for the Pagan Spirit Gathering that made its debut in 1981. Fundraising for a land purchase began in 1980, and the land was purchased in 1983.

Its current legal name, "Circle Sanctuary, Inc.," was registered with the State of Wisconsin on September 30, 1983.

During 1984, Circle Sanctuary assisted in updating the United States Army's Requirements and Practices of Certain Selected Groups: A Handbook for Chaplains. By that time, Circle Network had existed for several years, bringing neopagans of many paths together. Circle was also involved in legal battles during the mid- to late-1980s, as the local township government attempted to use zoning laws to prevent Circle from establishing the sanctuary land as church land. This effort failed, as Circle won key decisions that culminated in the same local government granting Circle the nation's first official recognition as a church of witchcraft in 1988. Today, Circle enjoys excellent relations with the local town board.

The 1990s were a period of increasing growth for Circle. Both of its executive directors received advanced degrees by tying their fields of study into their neopagan experience, with Selena achieving an M.S. in counseling in 1995 from the University of Wisconsin – Madison, and Dennis achieving a Ph.D. in psychology in 1994 from Saybrook Institute. Circle was a sponsor for the Parliament of World Religions in 1993, bringing Circle wide enough notice to attract the attention of fundamentalist Christian activists such as Pat Robertson, who described Circle Sanctuary on his television program The 700 Club and in his book The New World Order as "a 1000 acre [4 km^{2}] sanctuary for witches", exaggerating the Sanctuary's land area fivefold.

Circle also participated in the Nature Religion Today conference sponsored by Lancaster University, United Kingdom in 1996. In 1997, the Pagan Spirit Gathering moved to Wisteria Campground in southern Ohio, having been held in southwestern Wisconsin at Eagle Cave near Blue River, Wisconsin. In 1998, Circle Magazine debuted as a quarterly magazine, replacing Circle Network News, which had been published as a newsletter/newspaper since 1978.

== Activities ==
=== Networking ===
Circle Network was founded in 1977 for the purpose of assisting pagans of all paths to "connect with each other and share information, ideas, and energy". There is no cost to affiliate, and membership is open to any pagan whose path espouses a reverence for nature and holds an ethical structure consistent with the Wiccan Rede.

=== Gatherings and celebrations ===
Circle Sanctuary sponsors gatherings year-round, but its largest festival is the Pagan Spirit Gathering (PSG), held annually to coincide with the Summer Solstice. At first, the festivals were held at Eagle Cave in Grant County Wisconsin, but it outgrew the facilities and in 1997 moved to a location near Athens, Ohio, at Wisteria. In 2009, PSG moved to Camp Zoe near Salem, Missouri, and in 2011, PSG moved to Stonehouse Farm in central Illinois.

All other gatherings sponsored by Circle happen on Circle Sanctuary land, with the exception of the Winter Solstice pageant held at a Unitarian Universalist Fellowship in Madison.

=== Legal support ===
Circle Sanctuary founded the Lady Liberty League in 1985. The LLL is the "religious freedom support service" of Circle, providing information and networking for those who are working with religious freedom issues relevant to Wicca and/or Nature spirituality. In addition, the LLL worked actively to counter negative stereotypes of neopagans, and has assisted others in furthering Wicca's acceptance. A recent example is the struggle to win approval from the United States military to place pentacles on the memorial markers for Wiccan soldiers killed in the line of duty.

=== Environmental work ===
Circle Sanctuary is located on a 200-acre (0.81 km^{2}) private nature preserve. Owned by Circle Sanctuary Inc, founded as a preserve in 1983 and zoned as "sacred land" in 1988, the preserve is dedicated not only to support and maintain local biodiversity, but also to allow people to study interactions on the land from both a scientific and a spiritual basis.

== Access to the sanctuary ==
The land is not open to drop-in visitors, in accordance with its purpose as a nature preserve. However, the land and its sacred sites are open for:

- Festivals held on the eight points of the Wheel of the Year (the Wiccan Sabbats)
- Earth Day
- Classes and intensives
- Monthly volunteer days
- Bi-monthly open visiting days

== See also ==
- Neopagan witchcraft
- Wiccan organisation
