= Holly King and Oak King =

Personifications of winter and summer

The Holly King and Oak King are personifications of the waxing day length of the sun (Oak King) and the waning day length of the sun (Holly King) in various neopagan traditions. The two kings engage in endless "battle" reflecting the seasonal cycles of the year: not only solar light and dark, but also crop renewal and growth. The Holly King regains power at the summer solstice, after which the waning day length rules, until the winter solstice, at which point the Oak King is reborn, regaining power, and perpetuating the succession.

== Interpretations ==
Robert Graves in The White Goddess identifies other legends and archetypes of paired hero-figures as the basis of the Holly/Oak King myth, including:

- Lleu Llaw Gyffes and Gronw Pebr
- Gwyn and Gwythyr
- Lugh and Balor
- Balan and Balin
- Gawain and the Green Knight
- Jesus and John the Baptist

Similar comparisons had been previously suggested by Sir James George Frazer in The Golden Bough in Chapter XXVIII, "The Killing of the Tree Spirit" in the section "The Battle of Summer and Winter". Frazer drew parallels between the folk-customs associated with May Day or the changing seasons in Scandinavian, Bavarian and Native American cultures, amongst others, in support of this theory. However the Divine King of Frazer was split into the kings of winter and summer in Graves' work.

Stewart and Janet Farrar characterize the Oak King ruling the waxing year and the Holly King ruling the waning year, and apply the interpretation to Wiccan seasonal rituals. According to Joanne Pearson, the Holly King is represented by holly and other evergreens, and personifies the dark half of the Wheel of the Year. The Holly King is also seen by some Neopagans as prehistoric forebear of the Father Christmas legend.

== In culture and modern beliefs ==
The battle of light with dark is commonly played out in traditional folk dance and mummers plays across Britain such as Calan Mai in Wales, Mazey Day in Cornwall, and Jack in the Green traditions in England that typically include a ritual battle in some form.

Some adherents of Modern Paganism consider the two counterparts as dual aspects of the Horned God waging for the favour of the Goddess.

== See also ==
- Alban Arthan
- Dying-and-rising deity
- Green Man
- Krampus
- Ritual of oak and mistletoe
- Seven Days in New Crete (1949)
- Triple Goddess (Neopaganism)
