= Triple Goddess (Neopaganism) =

Triunity of deities in Neopaganism

- Goddess of the Moon, the Earth, and childbirth
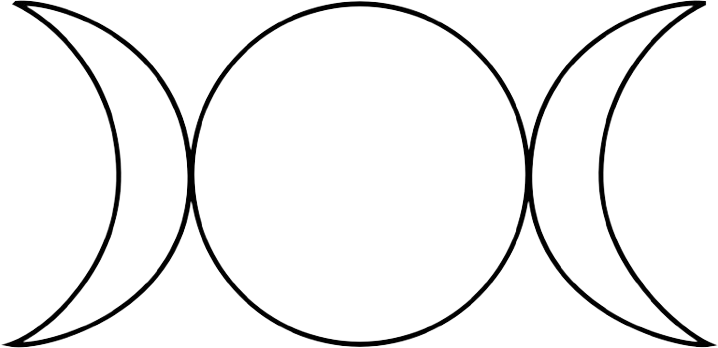
- Symbol: Crescent, full, and dark moon (original); Crescent, half, and full moon (late Antiquity); Waxing, full, and waning moons (modern)

The Triple Goddess is a deity or deity archetype revered in many Neopagan religious and spiritual traditions. In common Neopagan usage, the Triple Goddess is viewed as a triunity of three distinct aspects or figures united in one being. These three figures are often described as the Maiden, the Mother, and the Crone, each of which symbolizes both a separate stage in the female life cycle and a phase of the Moon, and often rules one of the realms of heavens, earth, and underworld. In various forms of Wicca, her masculine consort is the Horned God.

The Triple Goddess was the subject of much of the writing of early and middle 20th-century poet, novelist, and mythographer Robert Graves, in his books The White Goddess and The Greek Myths as well as in his poetry and novels. Modern neopagan conceptions of the Triple Goddess have been heavily influenced by Graves, who regarded her as the continuing muse of all true poetry, and who speculatively imagined her ancient worship, drawing on the scholarship, fiction and mythology of his time, in particular the work of Jane Ellen Harrison and other Cambridge Ritualists. Hungarian scholar of Greek mythology Karl Kerenyi likewise perceived an underlying triple moon goddess in Greek mythology. Archaeologist Marija Gimbutas also argued for the ancient worship of a universal Triple Goddess in European cultures but, as with Graves, her generalization of these theories to multiple unrelated cultures, and the unsourced homogenization of diverse cultures into one unified cultural and religious figure, has attracted much controversy. Many neopagan belief systems follow Graves' and Gimbutas' proposed figure of a universal, cross-cultural Triple Goddess, and these ideas continue to be an influence on feminism, literature, Jungian psychology and literary criticism.

== Origins ==
Various triune or triple goddesses, or deities who appeared in groupings of three, were known to ancient religion. Well-known examples include the Tridevi (Saraswati, Lakshmi, and Parvati), Triglav (Slavs), the Charites (Graces), the Horae (Seasons, of which there were three in the ancient Hellenistic reckoning), and the Moirai (Fates). Some deities generally depicted as singular also included triplicate aspects. In Stymphalos, Hera was worshiped as a Girl, a Grown-up, and a Widow.

=== Hecate ===
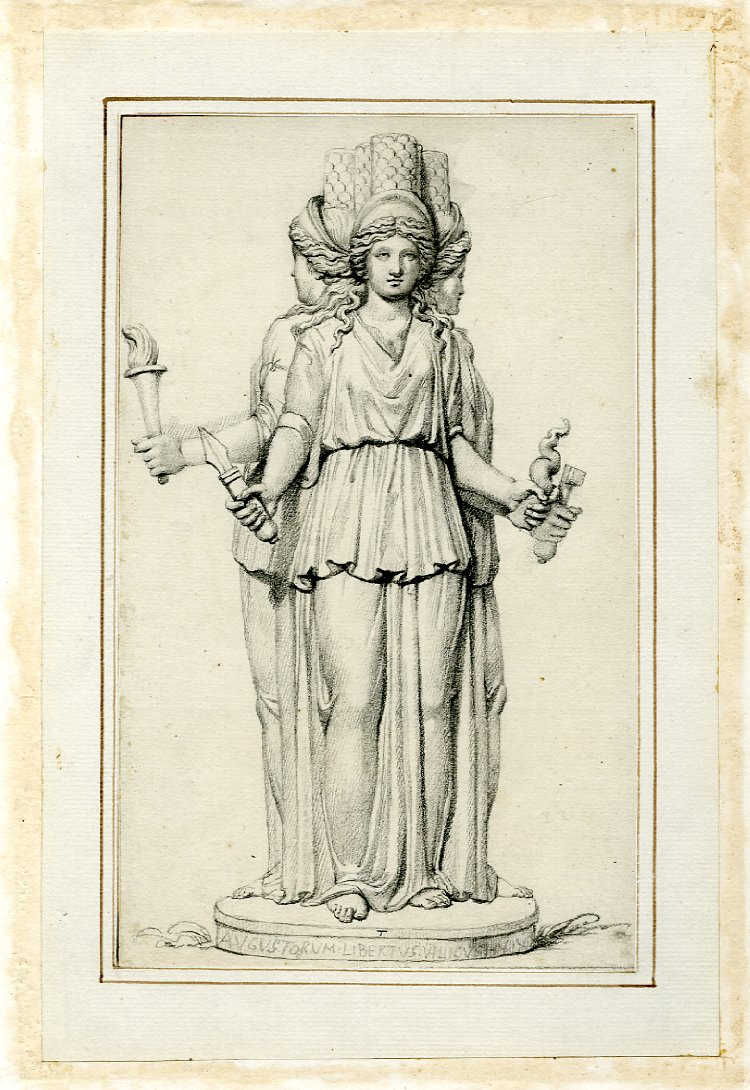
Drawing of a Hekataion, depicting Hecate as a triple goddess surrounding a central column.

According to Robert Graves, Hecate was the "original" and most predominant ancient triple moon goddess. Hecate was originally only represented in single form in the early days of her worship, but became triform in the late fifth century B.C. - although contrary to popular belief, all three forms were usually shown as being the same age. Diana (Artemis) also came to be viewed as a trinity of three goddesses in one, which were viewed as distinct aspects of a single divine being: "Diana as huntress, Diana as the moon, Diana of the underworld." Additional examples of the goddess Hecate viewed as a triple goddess associated with witchcraft include Lucan's tale of a group of witches, written in the 1st century BCE. In Lucan's work (LUC. B.C. 6:700-01), the witches speak of "Persephone, who is the third and lowest aspect of our goddess Hecate". Another example is found in Ovid's Metamorphosis (Met. 7:94–95), in which Jason swears an oath to the witch Medea, saying he would "be true by the sacred rites of the three-fold goddess."

The neoplatonist philosopher Porphyry was the first to record an explicit belief that the three aspects of Hecate (an important goddess in the Neoplatonic tradition of Late Antiquity) represented the phases of the moon: new, waxing, and full. In his 3rd century AD work On Images, Porphyry wrote: "the moon is Hekate, the symbol of her varying phases and of her power dependent on the phases. Wherefore her power appears in three forms, having as symbol of the new moon the figure in the white robe and golden sandals, and torches lighted: the basket, which she bears when she has mounted high, is the symbol of the cultivation of the crops, which she makes to grow up according to the increase of her light: and again the symbol of the full moon is the goddess of the brazen sandals." Porphyry also associated Hecate with Dionysus, who he said they set beside her partially "on account of their growth of horns".

=== The Graces, Seasons, and Fates ===
The specific character of the modern neopagan Maiden, Mother, and Crone archetype is not found in any ancient sources related directly to Hecate, or to most of the triple goddesses or trinities described above. Both Diana and Hecate were almost invariably described as maiden goddesses, with an appearance like that of a young woman. However, according to the 3rd century BC grammarian Epigenes, the three Moirai, or Fates, were regarded by the Orphic tradition as representing the three divisions of the Moon, "the thirtieth and the fifteenth and the first" (i.e. the crescent moon, full moon, and dark moon, as delinted by the divisions of the calendar month). The Moirai themselves were depicted in Renaissance and modern art as a young girl (Clotho), an older woman (Lachesis), and an elderly woman (Atropos), but no surviving art from antiquity depicts them as such. The connection between the Fates and the variously named Triple Moon Goddess, then ultimately led to the conflation of these concepts. Servius made the explicit connection between these phases and the roles of the Moirai: "some call the same goddess Lucina, Diana, and Hecate, because they assign to one goddess the three powers of birth, growth, and death. Some that say that Lucina is the goddess of birth, Diana of growth, and Hecate of death. On account of this three-fold power, they have imagined her as three-fold and three-form, and for that reason they built temples at the meeting of three roads." Servius' text included a drawing of a crescent moon (representing the new moon), a half moon (representing the waxing moon), and the full moon.

According to Jane Ellen Harrison:

The three Horae are the three phases of Selene, the Moon waxing, full, and waning. ... [T]he Moon is the true mother of the triple Horae, who are themselves Moirai, and the Moirai, as Orpheus tells us, are but the three moirai or divisions (μέρη) of the Moon herself, the three divisions of the old year. And these three Moirai or Horae are also Charites."

The syncretism of the predominant triple moon goddess (a united figure of Diana/Hecate/Selene), combined with the Orphic belief that the Seasons and the Fates were divisions of this same divinity, along with the latter representing the three stages of life, ultimately gave rise to the modern conception of a Triple Goddess whose symbol is the moon and whose triplicity can be conceived of both in terms of the moon's phases as the "Maiden, Mother, and Crone". However, it was not until the early 20th century that this fairly obscure ancient connection was developed and popularized.

== Modern development ==
=== Jane Ellen Harrison ===
The belief in a singular Triple Moon Goddess was likely brought to modern scholarship, if not originated by, (Note: Meskell 1999, p. 87: "It seems clear that the initial recording of Çatalhöyük [1961–1965] was largely influenced by decidedly Greek notions of ritual and magic, especially that of the Triple Goddess — maiden, mother, and crone. These ideas were common to many at that time, but probably originated with Jane Ellen Harrison, Classical archaeologist and member of the famous Cambridge Ritualists (Harrison 1903).") (Note: Hutton 2001, pp. 36–37: "In 1903... an influential Cambridge classicist, Jane Ellen Harrison, declared her belief in [a Great Earth Mother] but with a threefold division of aspect. ... [S]he pointed out that the pagan ancient world had sometimes believed in partnerships of three divine women, such as the Fates or the Graces. She argued that the original single one, representing the earth, had likewise been honoured in three roles. The most important of these were the Maiden, ruling the living, and Mother, ruling the underworld; she did not name the third. ... [S]he declared that all male deities had originally been subordinate to the goddess as her lovers and her sons.") the work of Jane Ellen Harrison. (Note: Harrison 1991, pp. 286ff: Excerpts: "... Greek religion has... a number of triple forms, Women-Trinities.... the trinity-form was confined to the women goddesses. ... of a male trinity we find no trace. ... The ancient threefold goddesses....") Harrison asserts the existence of female trinities, and uses Epigenes and other ancient sources to elaborate on the Horae, Fates, and Graces as chronological symbols representing the phases of the Moon and the threefold division of the Hellenistic lunar month.

However, Harrison's interpretations and contribution to the development and study of the Triple Goddess were somewhat overshadowed by the more controversial and poorly-supported ideas in her works. Most notably, Harrison used historical sources for the existence of an ancient Triple Moon Goddess to support her belief in an ancient matriarchal civilization, which has not stood up to academic scrutiny. Ronald Hutton writes:

[Harrison's] work, both celebrated and controversial, posited the previous existence of a peaceful and intensely creative woman-centred civilization, in which humans, living in harmony with nature and their own emotions, worshipped a single female deity. The deity was regarded as representing the earth, and as having three aspects, of which the first two were Maiden and Mother; she did not name the third. ... Following her work, the idea of a matristic early Europe which had venerated such a deity was developed in books by amateur scholars such as Robert Briffault's The Mothers (1927) and Robert Graves's The White Goddess (1948).

John Michael Greer writes:

Harrison proclaimed that Europe itself had been the location of an idyllic, goddess-worshipping, matriarchal civilization just before the beginning of recorded history, and spoke bitterly of the disastrous consequences of the Indo-European invasion that destroyed it. In the hands of later writers such as Robert Graves, Jacquetta Hawkes, and Marija Gimbutas, this 'lost civilization of the goddess' came to play the same sort of role in many modern Pagan communities as Atlantis and Lemuria did in Theosophy.

The "myth and ritual" school or the Cambridge Ritualists, of which Harrison was a key figure, while controversial in its day, is now considered passé in intellectual and academic terms. According to Robert Ackerman, "[T]he reason the Ritualists have fallen into disfavor... is not that their assertions have been controverted by new information... Ritualism has been swept away not by an access of new facts but of new theories."

Ronald Hutton wrote on the decline the "Great Goddess" theory specifically: "The effect upon professional prehistorians was to make most return, quietly and without controversy, to that careful agnosticism as to the nature of ancient religion which most had preserved until the 1940s. There had been no absolute disproof of the veneration of a Great Goddess, only a demonstration that the evidence concerned admitted of alternative explanations." Hutton did not dispute that in ancient pagan worship "partnerships of three divine women" occurred; rather he proposed that Jane Harrison looked to such partnerships to help explain how ancient goddesses could be both virgin and mother (the third person of the triad being as yet unnamed). She was, according to Hutton, "extending" the ideas of archaeologist Sir Arthur Evans who in excavating Knossos in Crete had come to the view that prehistoric Cretans had worshiped a single mighty goddess at once virgin and mother. In Hutton's view Evans' opinion owed an "unmistakable debt" to the Christian belief in the Virgin Mary.

=== Jungian archetype theory ===
The Triple Goddess as an archetype is discussed in the works of both Carl Jung and Karl Kerényi, and the later works of their follower Erich Neumann. Jung considered the general arrangement of deities in triads as a pattern which arises at the most primitive level of human mental development and culture.

In 1949 Jung and Kerényi theorized that groups of three goddesses found in Greece become quaternities only by association with a male god. They give the example of Diana only becoming three (Daughter, Wife, Mother) through her relationship to Zeus, the male deity. They go on to state that different cultures and groups associate different numbers and cosmological bodies with gender.

The threefold division [of the year] is inextricably bound up with the primitive form of the goddess Demeter, who was also Hecate, and Hecate could claim to be mistress of the three realms. In addition, her relations to the moon, the corn, and the realm of the dead are three fundamental traits in her nature. The goddess's sacred number is the special number of the underworld: '3' dominates the chthonic cults of antiquity."

Kerenyi wrote in 1952 that several Greek goddesses were triple moon goddesses of the Maiden Mother Crone type, including Hera and others. For example, Kerényi writes:

With Hera the correspondences of the mythological and cosmic transformation extended to all three phases in which the Greeks saw the moon: she corresponded to the waxing moon as maiden, to the full moon as fulfilled wife, to the waning moon as abandoned withdrawing women".

He goes on to say that trios of sister goddess in Greek myth refer to the lunar cycle; in the book in question he treats Athene also as a triple moon goddess, noting the statement by Aristotle that Athene was the Moon but not "only" the Moon.

In discussing examples of his Great Mother archetype, Neumann mentions the Fates as "the threefold form of the Great Mother", details that "the reason for their appearance in threes or nines, or more seldom in twelves, is to be sought in the threefold articulation underlying all created things; but here it refers most particularly to the three temporal stages of all growth (beginning-middle-end, birth-life-death, past-present-future)." Andrew Von Hendy writes that Neumann's theories are based on circular reasoning, whereby a Eurocentric view of world mythology is used as evidence for a universal model of individual psychological development which mirrors a sociocultural evolutionary model derived from European mythology.

=== Robert Graves ===
As a poet and mythographer, Robert Graves claimed a historical basis for the Triple Goddess. Although Graves's work is widely discounted by academics as pseudohistory (see The White Goddess § Criticism and The Greek Myths § Reception), it continues to have a lasting influence on many areas of Neopaganism.

Ronald Hutton argues that the concept of the triple moon goddess as Maiden, Mother, and Crone, each facet corresponding to a phase of the moon, is a modern creation of Graves', who in turn drew on the work of 19th and 20th century scholars such as especially Jane Harrison; and also Margaret Murray, James Frazer, the other members of the "myth and ritual" school of Cambridge Ritualists, and the occultist and writer Aleister Crowley.

While Graves was the originator of the idea of the Triple Goddess as embodying Maiden/Mother/Crone, this was not the only trinity he proposed. In his 1944 historical novel The Golden Fleece, Graves wrote "Maiden, Nymph and Mother are the eternal royal Trinity...and the Goddess, who is worshipped...in each of these aspects, as New Moon, Full Moon, and Old Moon, is the sovereign deity."

In his best-known work, The White Goddess: a Historical Grammar of Poetic Myth (1948), Graves described the trinity of the Triple Goddess in several different ways:

- Representing stages of a woman's life:
  - Maiden/Nymph/Hag
  - Maiden/Mother/Crone
- Representing the women associated with stages of a man's life:
  - Mother/Bride/Layer-out

Graves explained, "As Goddess of the Underworld she was concerned with Birth, Procreation and Death. As Goddess of the Earth she was concerned with the three season of Spring, Summer and Winter: she animated trees and plants and ruled all living creatures. As Goddess of the Sky she was the Moon, in her three phases of New Moon, Full Moon, and Waning Moon...As the New Moon or Spring she was a girl; as the Full Moon or Summer she was woman; as the Old Moon or Winter she was hag."

In the 1949 novel Seven Days in New Crete, Graves extrapolated this theory into an imagined future society where the worship of the Triple Goddess (under the three aspects of the maiden archer Nimuë, the goddess of motherhood and sexuality Mari, and the hag-goddess of wisdom Ana) is the main form of religion.

Graves wrote extensively on the subject of the Triple Goddess who he saw as the Muse of all true poetry in both ancient and modern literature. He thought that her ancient worship underlay much of classical Greek myth although reflected there in a more or less distorted or incomplete form. As an example of an unusually complete survival of the "ancient triad" he cites from the classical source Pausanias the worship of Hera in three persons. Pausanias recorded the ancient worship of Hera Pais (Girl Hera), Hera Teleia (Adult Hera), and Hera Khera (Widow Hera, though Khera can also mean separated or divorced) at a single sanctuary reputedly built by Temenus, son of Pelasgus, in Stymphalos. Other examples he gives include the goddess triad Moira, Ilythia and Callone ("Death, Birth and Beauty") from Plato's Symposium; the goddess Hecate; the story of the rape of Kore (the triad here Graves said to be Kore, Persephone and Hecate with Demeter the general name of the goddess); alongside a large number of other configurations. A figure he used from outside of Greek myth was of the Akan Triple Moon Goddess Ngame, who Graves said was still worshipped in 1960.

Graves regarded "true poetry" as inspired by the Triple Goddess, as an example of her continuing influence in English poetry he instances the "Garland of Laurell" by the English poet, John Skelton (c.1460–1529) — Diana in the leavës green, Luna that so bright doth sheen, Persephone in Hell. — as evoking his Triple Goddess in her three realms of earth, sky and underworld. Skelton was here following the Latin poet Ovid. James Frazer's seminal Golden Bough centres around the cult of the Roman goddess Diana who had three aspects, associated with the Moon, the forest, and the underworld.

Graves stated that his Triple Goddess is the Great Goddess "in her poetic or incantatory character", and that the goddess in her ancient form took the gods of the waxing and waning year successively as her lovers. Graves believed that the Triple Goddess was an aboriginal deity also of Britain, and that traces of her worship survived in early modern British witchcraft and in various modern British cultural attitudes such as what Graves believed to be a preference for a female sovereign.

In the anthology The Greek Myths (1955), Graves systematically applied his convictions enshrined in The White Goddess to Greek mythology, exposing a large number of readers to his various theories concerning goddess worship in ancient Greece. Graves posited that Greece had been settled by a matriarchal goddess-worshipping people before being invaded by successive waves of patriarchal Indo-European speakers from the north. Much of Greek myth in his view recorded the consequent religious political and social accommodations until the final triumph of patriarchy.

Graves did not invent this picture but drew from nineteenth and early twentieth century scholarship. According to Ronald Hutton, Graves used Jane Ellen Harrison's idea of goddess-worshipping matriarchal early Europe and the imagery of three aspects, and related these to the Triple Goddess. This theory has not necessarily been disproved, but modern scholarship has favored other explanations for the evidence used by Graves and Harrison to support their ideas, which are not accepted as a consensus view today. The twentieth century archaeologist Marija Gimbutas (see below) also argued for a triple goddess-worshipping European neolithic modified and eventually overwhelmed by waves of partiarchal invaders although she saw this neolithic civilization as egalitarian and "matristic" rather than "matriarchal" in the sense of gynocratic.

=== Marija Gimbutas ===
Scholar Marija Gimbutas's theories relating to goddess-centered culture among pre-Indo-European "Old Europe" (6500–3500 BCE) have been widely adopted by New Age and ecofeminist groups. She had been referred to as the "Grandmother of the Goddess Movement" in the 1990s.

Gimbutas postulated that in "Old Europe", the Aegean and the Near East, a single great Triple Goddess was worshipped, predating what she deemed as a patriarchal religion imported by the Kurgan culture, nomadic speakers of Indo-European languages. Gimbutas interpreted iconography from Neolithic and earlier periods of European history evidence of worship of a triple goddess represented by:

1. "stiff nudes", birds of prey or poisonous snakes interpreted as "death"
2. mother-figures interpreted as symbols of "birth and fertility"
3. moths, butterflies or bees, or alternatively a frog, hedgehog or bull's head symbolizing the uterus or fetus, representing "regeneration"

The first and third aspects of the goddess, according to Gimbutas, were frequently conflated to make a goddess of death-and-regeneration represented in folklore by such figures as Baba Yaga. Gimbutas regarded the Eleusinian Mysteries as a survival into classical antiquity of this ancient goddess worship, a suggestion which Georg Luck echoes.

Academic skepticism regarding her goddess-centered Old Europe thesis is widespread. Gimbutas' evidence has been criticized on the grounds of dating, archaeological context, and typologies, with most archaeologists considering her goddess hypothesis implausible. Lauren Talalay, reviewing Gimbutas's last book, The Living Goddesses, says that it reads "more like a testament of faith than a well-conceived thesis", stating that "Just because a triangle schematically mimics the female pubic region, or a hedgehog resembles a uterus (!), or dogs are allied with death in Classical mythology, it is hardly justifiable to associate all these images with 'the formidable goddess of regeneration'." Lynn Meskell considers such an approach "irresponsible". However, linguist M. L. West has called Gimbutas's fundamental thesis of a goddess-based "Old European" religion being overtaken by a patriarchal Indo-European one "essentially sound".

Academic rejection of her theories has been echoed by some feminist authors, including Cynthia Eller. Others argue that her account challenges male-centred histories and creates a powerful origin-myth of female empowerment. John Chapman suggests that Gimbutas' Goddess theories were a poetic projection of her personal life, based on her idealized childhood and adolescence.

== Contemporary beliefs and practices ==
The "Triple Goddess" symbol of the waxing, full and waning moon, representing the aspects of Maiden, Mother, and Crone

While most Neopagans are not Wiccan, and within Neopaganism the practices and theology vary widely, many Wiccans and other neopagans worship the "Triple Goddess" of maiden, mother, and crone. In their view, sexuality, pregnancy, breastfeeding—and other female reproductive processes—are ways that women may embody the Goddess, making the physical body sacred.

- The Maiden represents enchantment, inception, expansion, the promise of new beginnings, birth, youth and youthful enthusiasm, represented by the waxing moon;
- The Mother represents ripeness, fertility, sexuality, fulfilment, stability, power and life represented by the full moon;
- The Crone represents wisdom, repose, death, and endings represented by the waning moon.

Helen Berger writes that "according to believers, this echoing of women's life stages allowed women to identify with deity in a way that had not been possible since the advent of patriarchal religions." The Church of All Worlds is one example of a neopagan organization which identifies the Triple Goddess as symbolizing a "fertility cycle". This model is also supposed to encompass a personification of all the characteristics and potential of every woman who has ever existed. Other beliefs held by worshippers, such as Wiccan author D. J. Conway, include that reconnection with the Great Goddess is vital to the health of humankind "on all levels". Conway includes the Greek goddesses Demeter, Kore-Persephone, and Hecate, in her discussion of the Maiden-Mother-Crone archetype. Conway specifically believes the Triple Goddess stands for unity, cooperation, and participation with all creation, while in contrast masculine gods can represent dissociation, separation and dominion of nature.

The Dianic tradition adopted Graves's Triple Goddess, along with other elements from Wicca, and is named after the Roman goddess Diana, the goddess of the witches in Charles Godfrey Leland's 1899 book Aradia. Zsuzsanna Budapest, widely considered the founder of Dianic Wicca, considers her Goddess "the original Holy Trinity; Virgin, Mother, and Crone." Dianic Wiccans such as Ruth Barrett, follower of Budapest and co-founder of the Temple of Diana, use the Triple Goddess in ritual work and correspond the "special directions" of "above", "center", and "below" to Maiden, Mother, and Crone respectively. Barrett says "Dianics honour She who has been called by Her daughters throughout time, in many places, and by many names."

Some neopagans believe that the Triple Goddess is an archetypal figure which appears in a number of different cultures throughout human history, and that many individual goddesses can be interpreted as Triple Goddesses. The wide acceptance of an archetype theory has led to neopagans adopting the images and names of culturally divergent deities for ritual purposes; for instance, Conway, (Note: Conway 1995b, p. 230: "Nov. 27: Day of Parvati-Devi, the Triple Goddess who divided herself into Sarasvati, Lakshmi, and Kali, or the Three Mothers.") and goddess feminist artist Monica Sjöö, connect the Triple Goddess to the Hindu Tridevi (literally "three goddesses") of Saraswati, Lakshmi, and Parvati (Kali/Durga). Several advocates of Wicca, such as Vivianne Crowley and Selena Fox, are practising psychologists or psychotherapists and looked specifically to the work of Carl Jung to develop the theory of the Goddess as an archetype. Wouter J. Hanegraaff comments that Vivianne Crowley's works can give the impression that Wicca is little more than a religious and ritual translation of Jungian psychology.

Valerie H. Mantecon follows Annis V. Pratt that the Triple Goddess of Maiden, Mother and Crone is a male invention that both arises from and biases an androcentric view of femininity, and as such the symbolism is often devoid of real meaning or use in depth-psychology for women. Mantecon suggests that a feminist re-visioning of the Crone symbolism away from its usual associations with "death" and towards "wisdom" can be useful in women transitioning to the menopausal phase of life and that the sense of history that comes from working with mythological symbols adds a sense of meaning to the experience.

== Fiction, film, and literary criticism ==
Author Margaret Atwood recalls reading Graves's The White Goddess at the age of 19. Atwood describes Graves' concept of the Triple Goddess as employing violent and misandric imagery, and says the restrictive role this model places on creative women put her off being a writer. Atwood's work has been noted as containing Triple Goddess motifs who sometimes appear failed and parodic. Atwood's Lady Oracle has been cited as a deliberate parody of the Triple Goddess, which subverts the figure and ultimately liberates the lead female character from the oppressive model of feminine creativity that Graves constructed.

Terry Pratchett's Discworld series provides another parodic take on the concept, with covens of witches generally made up of "The Maiden, the Mother, and the...Other One." It also plays with the concept in different ways; for example, Nanny Ogg is generally "the Mother" of the main witch trio, but is actually as old as Granny Weatherwax, while commenting that she never qualified as the Maiden mentally.

Literary critic Andrew D. Radford, discussing the symbolism of Thomas Hardy's 1891 novel Tess of the d'Urbervilles, in terms of Myth sees the Maiden and Mother as two phases of the female lifecycle through which Tess passes, whilst the Crone phase, Tess adopts as a disguise which prepares her for harrowing experiences .

The concept of the triple goddess has been applied to a feminist reading of Shakespeare.

Thomas DeQuincey developed a female trinity, Our Lady of Tears, the Lady of Sighs and Our Lady of Darkness, in Suspiria De Profundis, which has been likened to Graves's Triple Goddess but stamped with DeQuincey's own melancholy sensibility.

According to scholar Juliette Wood, modern fantasy fiction plays a large part in the conceptual landscape of the neo-pagan world. The three supernatural female figures called variously the Ladies, Mother of the Camenae, the Kindly Ones, and a number of other different names in The Sandman comic books by Neil Gaiman, merge the figures of the Fates and the Maiden-Mother-Crone goddess.

Alan Garner's The Owl Service, based on the fourth branch of the Mabinogion and influenced by Robert Graves, clearly delineates the character of the Triple Goddess. Garner goes further in his other novels, making every female character intentionally represent an aspect of the Triple Goddess.

In George R.R. Martin's A Song of Ice and Fire series, the Maid, the Mother, and the Crone are three aspects of the septune deity in the Faith of the Seven. The three feminine aspects are accompanied by a three masculine aspects –the Father, the Smith, and the Warrior – and a genderless personification of Death – the Stranger.

The neopagan triple goddess is incorporated in Marion Zimmer Bradley's The Mists of Avalon.

Graves's Triple Goddess motif has been used by Norman Holland to explore the female characters in Alfred Hitchcock's film Vertigo. Roz Kaveney sees the main characters in James Cameron's movie Aliens as: The Alien Queen (Crone), Ripley (Mother) and Newt (Maiden).

American heavy metal band The Sword's song, "Maiden, Mother & Crone", on their album Gods of the Earth, describes an encounter with the Triple Goddess. The video features three aspects of the goddess and a waxing, full, and waning moon.

In Foundation (TV series), the Luminist faith follows the Triple Goddess. Believing that she was once one being, split into three during a cataclysmic event where two planets in their system collided and caused one of them to split into three moons; aptly named, Maiden, Mother, and Crone. The Foundation TV series also uses this motif –albeit gender swapped– with its primary antagonists: three clone emperors known as Brother Dawn, Brother Day, and Brother Dusk. Each clone plays a different role (e.g. Dawn must learn to rule, Day is first among equals and primary ruler, and Dusk is advisor to Day and teacher to Dawn) and as they age they transition between which 'Brother' they are. In the show, the parallel between the Luminist pantheon and the nature of the three Brothers is leveraged to solve a religious dispute regarding the nature of a clone's soul.

== See also ==
- Holly King and Oak King – Personifications of winter and summer
- List of lunar deities
- Tripura Sundari – Hindu goddess
- Tritheism – Religious view
- Worship of heavenly bodies – Worship of stars and other heavenly bodies as deities
