= Wheel of the Year =

Annual cycle of seasonal festivals observed by modern and historical pagans

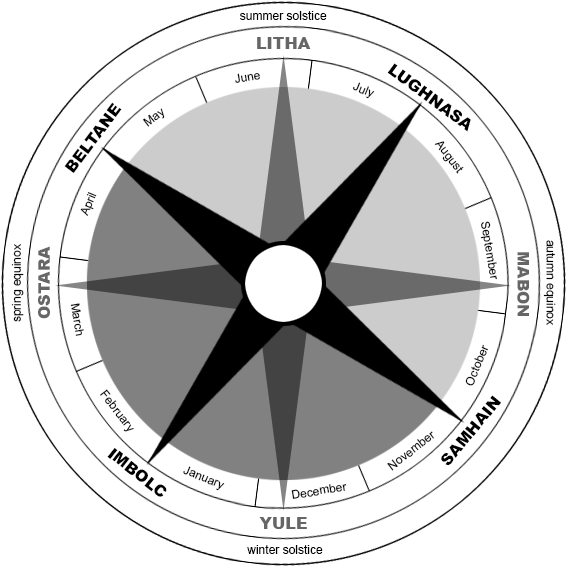
The Wheel of the Year in the Northern Hemisphere. Some Pagans in the Southern Hemisphere advance these dates six months to coincide with their own seasons.

The Wheel of the Year is an annual cycle of seasonal festivals marking the year's chief solar events (solstices and equinoxes) and the midpoints between them. Modern pagan observances of the cycle adapt a range of folk traditions to varying degrees. British neopagans popularized the Wheel of the Year in the mid-20th century, combining the four solar events ("quarter days") marked by many European peoples, with the four midpoint festivals ("cross-quarter days") celebrated by Insular Celtic peoples.

Some Wiccans use the term sabbat (/ˈsæbət/) to refer to each festival, represented as a spoke in the Wheel. Different paths of modern Paganism vary regarding the particular timing of each observance, based on such distinctions as the lunar phase and geographic hemisphere.

== Origins ==
Seasonal festival activities of pagan peoples differed across ancient Europe. Among the British Isles, Anglo-Saxons primarily marked the solar stations (solstices and equinoxes), while Insular Celtic peoples marked the four midpoints between them. The four Celtic festivals were known to the Gaels as Beltane (1 May), Lughnasadh (1 August), Samhain (1 November), and Imbolc (1 February).

Influential works such as The Golden Bough (1890) by James George Frazer explored various European seasonal festivals and their possible pagan roots. The Witch-Cult in Western Europe (1921) by Margaret Murray examined reports of the European witch trials, including a 1661 trial record from Forfar, Scotland, where the accused witch (Issobell Smyth) was alleged to attend witches meetings "every quarter" at Candlemas (2 February), Roodmas (3 May), Lammas (1 August), and Hallowmas (1 November). The White Goddess (1948) by Robert Graves suggested that, despite Christianisation, the importance of agricultural and social cycles had preserved eight holidays of "the ancient British festal system", consisting of Candlemas (2 February), Lady Day (25 March), May Day (1 May), Midsummer Day (24 June), Lammas (1 August), Michaelmas (29 September), Halloween (31 October), and Christmas (25 December).

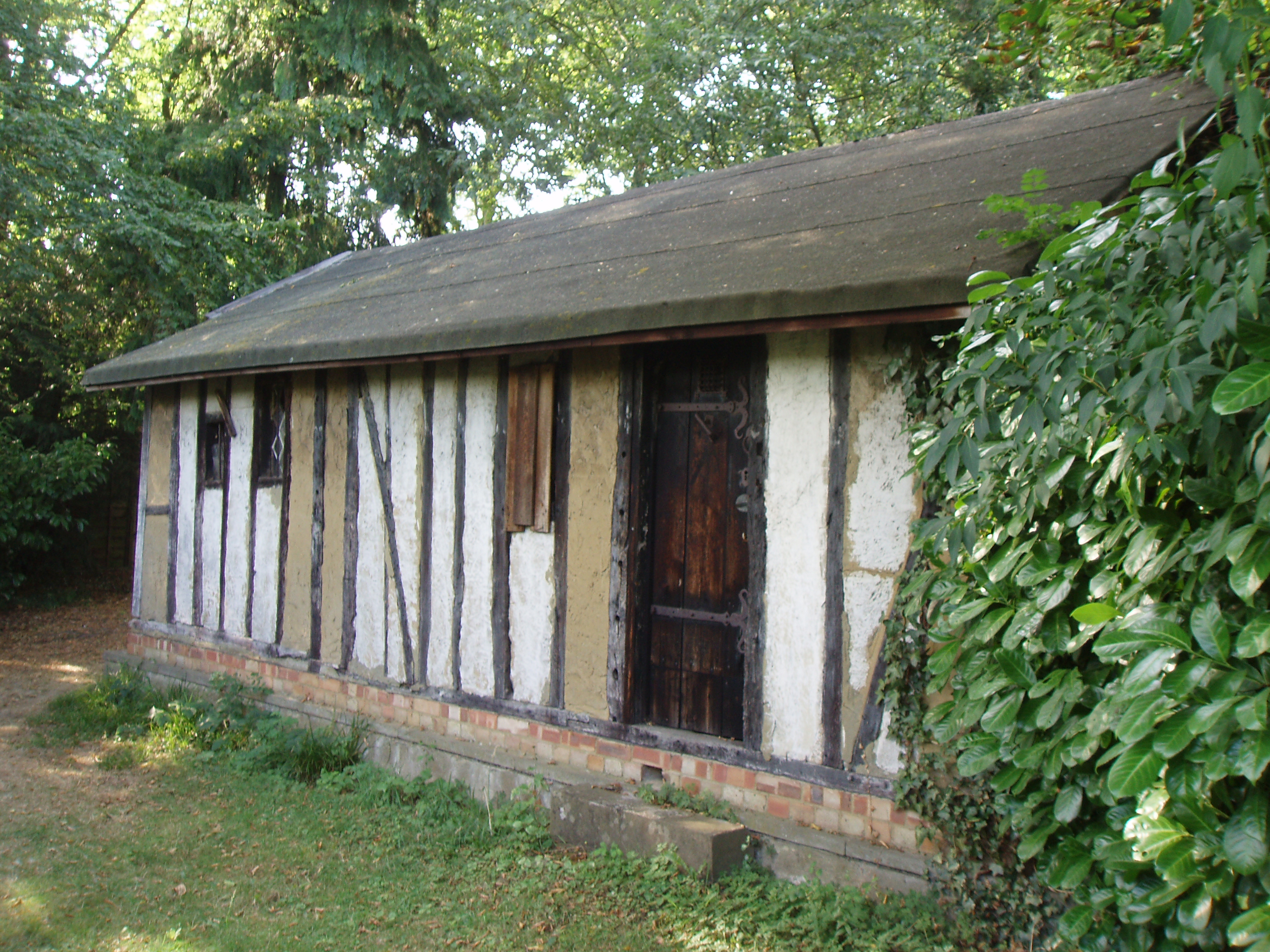
The Witches' Cottage, where the Bricket Wood coven celebrated their sabbats (2006)

Two neopagan streams in Britain popularised these seasonal festival calendars in the twentieth century: the Bricket Wood coven, a Wiccan group founded by Gerald Gardner, and the Order of Bards, Ovates and Druids, a neo-Druidic group founded by Ross Nichols. Legend holds that Gardner and Nichols harmonised an eight-fold calendar during a naturist retreat, merging the four solar stations alongside their four midpoints as a unified festival cycle. Coordination eventually had the benefit of better aligning celebrations between the two neopagan groups. Gardner's first publications refer to the Celtic festivals as "May eve, August eve, November eve (Hallowe'en), and February eve".

The phrase 'Wheel of the Year' was in use by the mid-1960s to describe an annual cycle of eight observances. Prominent Wiccan Aidan Kelly gave names to the Wiccan summer solstice (Litha) and equinox holidays (Ostara and Mabon) in 1974, which were then promoted by Timothy Zell through his Green Egg magazine. Popularisation of these names happened gradually; in her 1978 book Witchcraft For Tomorrow, influential Wiccan author Doreen Valiente did not use Kelly's holiday names, instead simply identifying the solstices and equinoxes ("Lesser Sabbats") by their seasons. Valiente identified the four "Greater Sabbats", or fire festivals, by the names Candlemas, May Eve, Lammas, and Hallowe'en, while also naming their Gaelic counterparts Imbolc, Beltane, Lughnasa, and Samhain.

Due to early Wicca's influence on modern paganism and the syncretic adoption of Anglo-Saxon and Celtic motifs, Wheel of the Year festival names in English commonly combine the Celtic names used by Gardner and the Germanic-derived names introduced by Kelly, regardless whether local celebrations are based on those cultures.

== Festivals ==
The eight-armed sun cross is often used to represent the modern pagan Wheel of the Year.

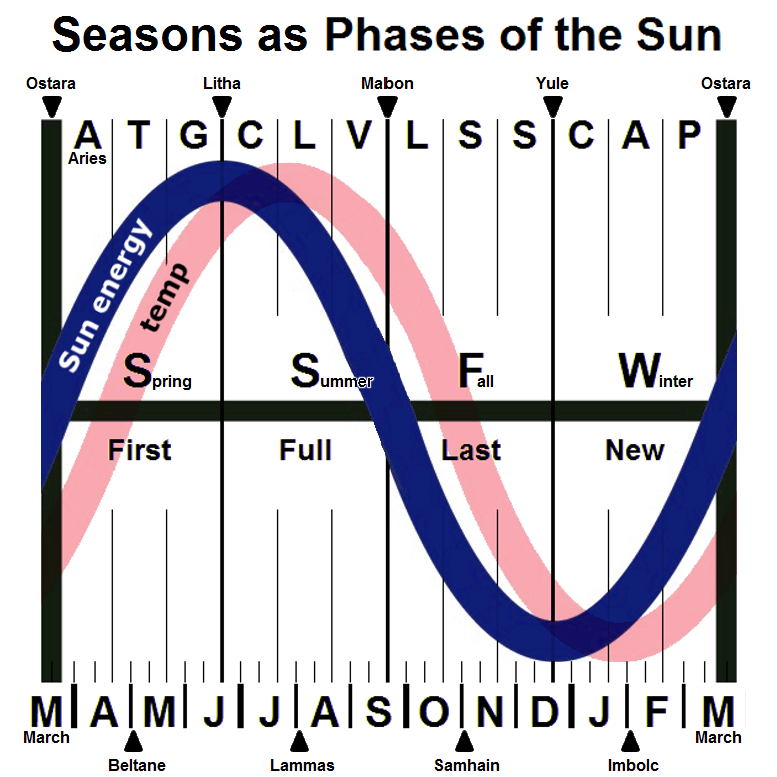
The annual cycle of insolation for the northern hemisphere (Sun energy, shown in blue) with key points for seasons (middle), quarter days (top) and cross-quarter days (bottom) along with months (lower) and Zodiac houses (upper). The cycle of temperature (shown in pink) is delayed by seasonal lag.

In many traditions of modern pagan cosmology, all things are considered to be cyclical, with time as a perpetual cycle of growth and retreat tied to the Sun's annual death and rebirth. This cycle is also viewed as a micro- and macrocosm of other life cycles in an immeasurable series of cycles composing the Universe. The days that fall on the landmarks of the yearly cycle traditionally mark the beginnings and middles of the four seasons. They are regarded with significance and host to major communal festivals. These eight festivals are the most common times for community celebrations.

In addition to the quarter and cross-quarter days, other festivals may also be celebrated throughout the year, especially in the context of polytheistic reconstructionism and other ethnic traditions. While festivals of the Wheel are steeped in solar mythology and symbolism, many Wiccan esbats are commonly based on lunar cycles. Together, they represent the most common celebrations in Wiccan-influenced forms of modern paganism, especially in Neopagan witchcraft groups.

=== Winter Solstice (Midwinter / Yule) ===
The winter solstice, falling on or about 21 December in the Northern hemisphere, is celebrated by neopagans under various names, including Midwinter and Yule. A name used by neo-druids is Alban Arthan. The Old English midwinter and ġeol (Yule) referred to the winter solstice day, and was reportedly when the heathen Anglo-Saxons celebrated the festival Mōdraniht. Before the Old Norse festival of jól (Yule) was Christianised, it was likely celebrated on the full moon of the lunisolar month following the winter solstice, rather than the solstice itself. This ranges between January 5 and February 2 in the Gregorian calendar.

The winter solstice has been recognised as a significant turning point in the yearly cycle since the late Stone Age. Ancient megalithic sites Newgrange and Stonehenge were carefully aligned with the winter solstice sunrise and sunset. The reversal of the Sun's ebbing presence in the sky symbolises the rebirth of the solar god and presages the return of fertile seasons. From Germanic to Roman tradition, this is the most important time of celebration.

Practices vary, but sacrifice offerings, feasting, and gift giving are common elements of Midwinter festivities. Bringing sprigs and wreaths of evergreenery (such as holly, ivy, mistletoe, yew, and pine) into the home and tree decorating are also common during this time.

=== Imbolc (Candlemas) ===
Imbolc is the traditional Gaelic name for 1 February and traditionally marks the first stirrings of spring. In Christianity it is Saint Brigid's Day, while 2 February is Candlemas. It aligns with the contemporary observance of Groundhog Day. It is time for purification and spring cleaning in anticipation of the year's new life. In ancient Rome, it was a shepherd's holiday, while the Gaels associated it with the onset of ewes' lactation, prior to birthing the spring lambs.

For Celtic neopagans, the festival is dedicated to the goddess Brigid, daughter of The Dagda and one of the Tuatha Dé Danann.

In the Reclaiming tradition, this is the traditional time for pledges and rededications for the coming year and for initiation among Dianic Wiccans.

=== Spring Equinox (Ostara) ===
Ostara is a name for the spring equinox in some modern pagan traditions. The term is derived from a reconstruction produced by linguist Jacob Grimm of an Old High German form of the Old English Ēostre, an Anglo-Saxon goddess for whom, according to Bede, feasts were held in her eponymous month, which he equated to April in the Julian calendar.

Known as Alban Eilir in strands of neo-druidry, this holiday is the second of three spring celebrations (the midpoint between Imbolc and Beltane), during which light and darkness are again in balance, with light on the rise. It is a time of new beginnings and of life emerging further from the grips of winter.

=== Beltane (May Day) ===
Beltane comes from the Gaelic name for May Day (Irish: Bealtaine and Scottish Gaelic: Bealtainn), with the Welsh names being Calan Mai, Calan Haf, or Cyntefin. Traditionally, it marked the beginning of summer. It is known as Walpurgis Night in Germanic countries. Ancient Rome observed Floralia at the same time of year.

Following the Christianisation of Europe, the May Day festival was generally associated with maypole dancing and the crowning of the May Queen.

May Day is celebrated in many neo-pagan traditions; in neo-druidry, it recognises the power of life in its fullness, the greening of the world, youthfulness, and flourishing.

=== Summer Solstice (Midsummer / Litha) ===
The summer solstice, falling on or about 21 June in the Northern hemisphere, is celebrated by neopagans under various names, including Midsummer and Litha. A name used by neo-druids is Alban Hefin.

The name Litha is found in Bede's The Reckoning of Time (De Temporum Ratione, eighth century), which preserves a list of the (then-obsolete) Anglo-Saxon names for the months of the early Germanic calendar. Ærra Liða (first or preceding Liða) roughly corresponds to June in the Gregorian calendar, and Æfterra Liða (following Liða) to July. Bede writes that "Litha means gentle or navigable, because in both these months the calm breezes are gentle and they were wont to sail upon the smooth sea".

In some neo-druid traditions the festival is called Alban Hefin. The sun in its greatest strength is greeted and celebrated on this holiday. While it is the time of greatest strength of the solar current, it also marks a turning point, for the sun also begins its time of decline as the wheel of the year turns. Arguably the most important neo-druidic festival, due to the focus on the sun and its light as a symbol of divine inspiration. Neo-druid groups frequently celebrate this event at Stonehenge.

=== Lughnasadh (Lammas) ===
Lughnasadh or Lúnasa (/ˈluːnæsə/) is the Gaelic name for a harvest festival held on or around 1 August. Its Welsh name is Calan Awst. In English it is Lammas. Some Wiccan traditions base their celebrations on the Celtic deity Lugh, for whom the holiday is named, while others draw on more eclectic sources. While Lughnasadh is one of the most common names for the holiday in Wicca currently, in early versions of Wiccan literature, the festival is referred to as August Eve.

Lammas is often referenced interchangeably with Lughnasadh, though the two are sometimes recognised as distinct and separate holidays. While Lughnasadh has Celtic origins, Lammas has Anglo-Saxon origins, and was often marked with the blessing of loaves of bread by the church. The name Lammas (contraction of loaf mass) implies it is an agrarian-based festival and feast of thanksgiving for grain and bread, which symbolises the first fruits of the harvest.

=== Autumn Equinox (Mabon) ===
The holiday of the autumnal equinox is known variously among neopagans as Mabon, Harvest Home, Mheillea, or Feast of the Ingathering. A name used by neo-druids is Alban Elfed. It is a neopagan festival of thanksgiving for the fruits of the earth and a recognition of the need to share them to secure the blessings of the Goddess and the Gods during the coming winter months. The name Mabon was coined by Aidan Kelly around 1970 as a reference to Mabon ap Modron, a character from Welsh mythology.

=== Samhain (All Hallows) ===
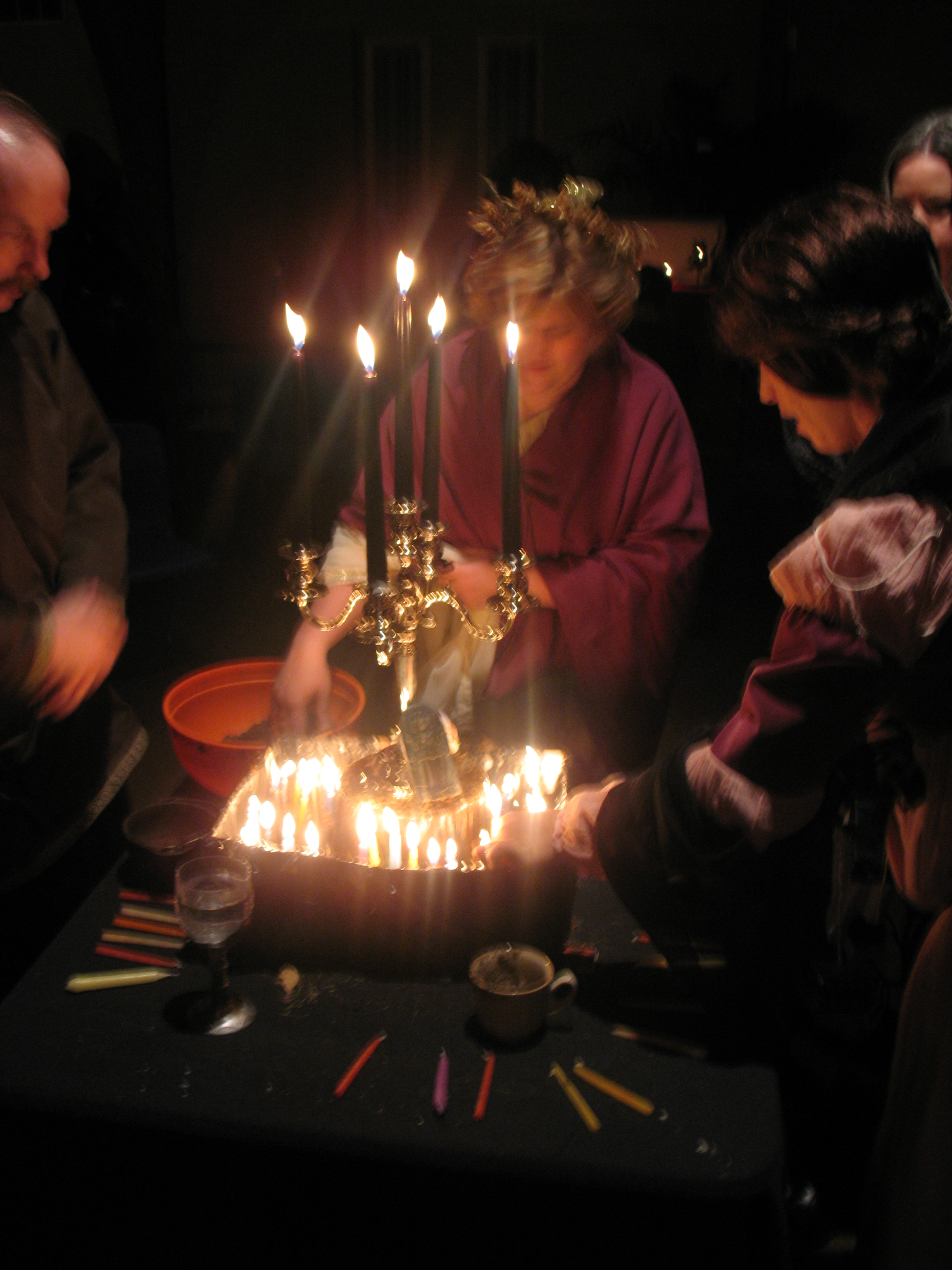
Neopagans honoring the dead as part of a Samhain ritual

Samhain (/ˈsɑːwɪn/), or Sauin, is the name of a traditional Gaelic festival held around 1 November. Its Welsh name is Calan Gaeaf. For Witches, it is a time to celebrate the lives of those who have passed on, and it often involves paying respect to ancestors, family members, elders of the faith, friends, pets, and other loved ones who have died. Aligned with the contemporary observance of Halloween and Day of the Dead, in some traditions the spirits of the departed are invited to attend the festivities. It is seen as a festival of darkness, which is balanced at the opposite point of the Wheel by the festival of Beltane, which is celebrated as a festival of light and fertility. Many neopagans believe that the veil between this world and the afterlife is at its thinnest point of the year at Samhain, making it easier to communicate with those who have departed.

Some authorities claim the Christian festival of All Hallows' Day (All Saints' Day, Hallowmas), and All Hallows' Eve, are appropriations of Samhain by early Christian missionaries to the British Isles.

== Practice ==
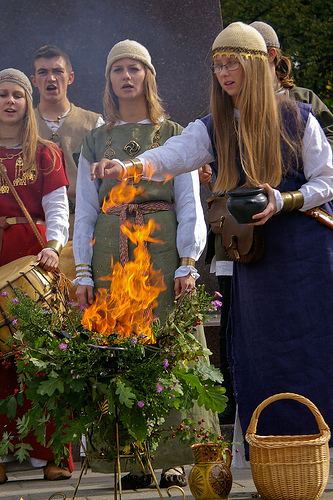
Romuva ceremony

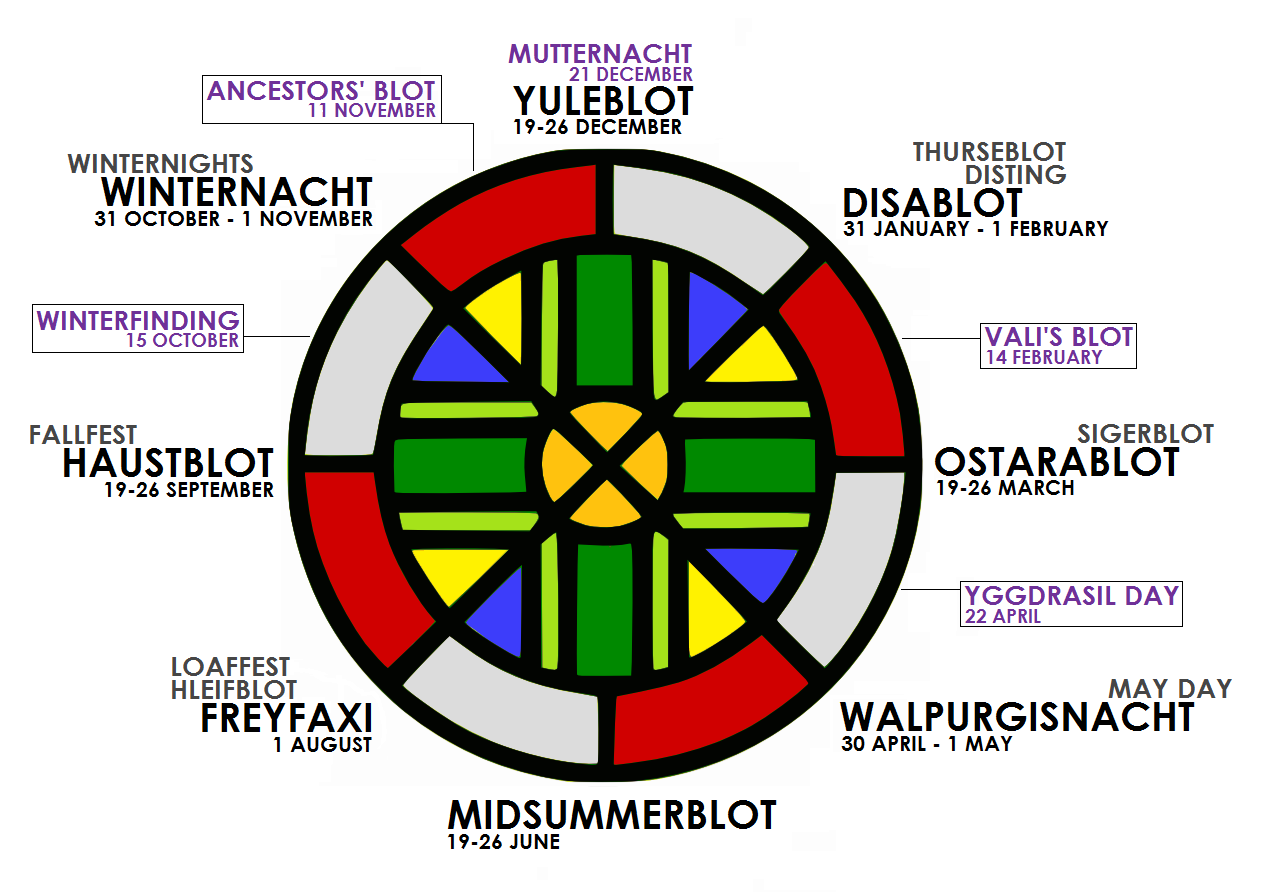
Holidays of the Ásatrú Alliance, with black text used for main terms, gray text for alternative terms, and purple for minor observances

Celebration commonly takes place outdoors in the form of a communal gathering.

=== Dates of celebration ===
The precise dates on which festivals are celebrated often vary to some degree, as would the related agricultural milestones of the local region. Celebrations may occur on the astrologically precise quarter and cross-quarter days, the nearest full moon, the nearest new moon, or the nearest weekend for contemporary convenience. The festivals were originally celebrated by peoples in the middle latitudes of the Northern Hemisphere. Consequently, the traditional timing for seasonal celebrations do not align with the seasons in the Southern Hemisphere or near the equator. Pagans in the Southern Hemisphere often advance these dates by six months to coincide with their own seasons.

=== Offerings ===
Offerings of food, drink, various objects, etc. have been central in ritual propitiation and veneration for millennia. Modern pagan practice strongly avoids sacrificing animals in favour of grains, herbs, milk, wines, incense, baked goods, minerals, etc. The exception being with ritual feasts including meat, where the inedible parts of the animal are often burned as offerings while the community eats the rest.

Sacrifices are typically offered to gods and ancestors by burning them. Burying and leaving offerings in the open are also common in certain circumstances. The purpose of offering is to benefit the venerated, show gratitude, and give something back, strengthening the bonds between humans and divine and between members of a community.

=== Heathen observances ===
Heathens may add to the demarcations of the Wheel of the Year with various Days of Remembrance celebrating heroes of the Edda and the Sagas and figures of Germanic history such as Leif Ericson, who explored parts of North America. Heathen organisations using the Wheel of the Year framework for their festival calendar include the Swedish group Samfundet Forn Sed Sverige, the American inclusive group The Troth, and the folkish Ásatrú Alliance.

=== Colours ===
According to some pagan traditions, for each holiday on the wheel, different colours are displayed. This practice is not universal, however, and there are a wide range of ways which different sects or individuals would decorate for the sabbats.

Colour	Holiday/Time of Year	Significance
Black|	Samhain	Black is the primary colour of Samhain. Black symbolises the vastness and mystery of the spirit world (and the universe to a greater extent). It also represents the dead and the fading of light in the ‘dark half’ of the year.
Red	Beltane, Yule	In Beltane, red is symbolic of strength, vitality, sex and passion, as well as of bonfires and other related symbols of the holiday. For Yule, red is symbolic of abundance, prosperity and good tidings.
Gold	Imbolc, Yule	For Imbolc, gold is symbolic of candle flames and light. During Yule, gold is associated with the Sun and gift giving.
White	Imbolc	White is the primary colour of Imbolc. Like gold, it symbolises light and candle flames. It also symbolises the snow, milk and Brigid, along with other symbols of the season.
Dark Green	Yule	In Yule, dark green symbolises the evergreen fauna which is used to decorate during the holiday – it is symbolic of wealth (gifts), nature and peace. In some traditions, dark green is representative of the Oak King, who conquers the Holly King for dominance in the next half of the year.
Light Green	Ostara, Litha, Beltane	Light green is used in a wide range of holidays. For Ostara, light green is symbolic of the new spring and the balance which nature brings. In Litha, light green is also symbolic of balance and harmony. In Beltane, the colour has similar associations, but also of the wildness and raw energy of nature.
Yellow	Litha, Lughnasadh/Lammas, Ostara	Yellow is one of the most versatile colours, and used in a plethora of holidays. In Litha, yellow is the primary colour, and symbolic of the Sun, joy and light. In Lughnasadh or Lammas, yellow is symbolic of the grain the holiday celebrates and the Sun. In Ostara, it represents flowers and spring.
Orange	Mabon, Samhain	In Mabon, orange represents the changing of the season and the fading of light in the darker half of the year. For Samhain, the colour comes secondary to black, but has similar associations as in Mabon, and also represents flames and a connection to the spirit world. In some sects the colour represents the Sun in rebirth when Yule arrives.
Pink	Ostara	For Ostara, pink is symbolic of the flowers and new spring.
Brown	Mabon	Brown is symbolic of the fallen leaves and changing seasons.

Many of these colours are also used in the different holidays interchangeably with the others, and colour decorations are not exclusively these colours. However, it is widely believed that Samhain has a particular association with black (and orange) only. Colour associations vary across sects and practice, nor are they an integral part to a holiday. Some practitioners do not have colour associations for sabbats at all.

== Narratives ==
=== Celtic ===
It is a misconception in some quarters of the modern pagan community, influenced by the writings of Robert Graves, that historical Celts had an overarching narrative for the entire cycle of the year. While the various Celtic calendars include some cyclical patterns, and a belief in the balance of light and dark, these beliefs vary between the different Celtic cultures. Modern preservationists and revivalists usually observe the four 'fire festivals' of the Gaelic Calendar, and some also observe local festivals that are held on dates of significance in the different Celtic nations.

=== Slavic ===
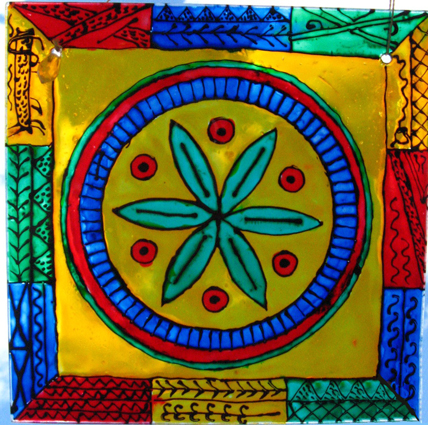
Kołomir – the Slavic example of Wheel of the Year indicating seasons of the year. Four-point and eight-point swastika-shaped wheels were more common.

Slavic mythology tells of a persisting conflict involving Perun, god of thunder and lightning, and Veles, the black god and horned god of the underworld. Enmity between the two is initiated by Veles' annual ascent up the world tree in the form of a huge serpent and his ultimate theft of Perun's divine cattle from the heavenly domain. Perun retaliates to this challenge of the divine order by pursuing Veles, attacking with his lightning bolts from the sky. Veles taunts Perun and flees, transforming himself into various animals and hiding behind trees, houses, even people. (Lightning bolts striking down trees or homes were explained as results of this.) In the end Perun overcomes and defeats Veles, returning him to his place in the realm of the dead. Thus the order of the world is maintained.

The idea that storms and thunder are actually divine battle is pivotal to the changing of the seasons. Dry periods are identified as chaotic results of Veles' thievery. This duality and conflict represents an opposition of the natural principles of earth, water, substance, and chaos (Veles) and of heaven, fire, spirit, order (Perun), not a clash of good and evil. The cosmic battle between the two also echoes the ancient Indo-European narrative of a fight between the sky-borne storm god and chthonic dragon.

On the great night (New Year), two children of Perun are born, Jarilo, god of fertility and vegetation and son of the Moon, and Morana, goddess of nature and death and daughter of the Sun. On the same night, the infant Jarilo is snatched and taken to the underworld, where Veles raises him as his own. At the time of the spring equinox, Jarilo returns across the sea from the world of the dead, bringing with him fertility and spring from the evergreen underworld into the realm of the living. He meets his sister Morana and courts her. With the beginning of summer, the two are married bringing fertility and abundance to Earth, ensuring a bountiful harvest. The union of Perun's kin and Veles' stepson brings peace between two great gods, staving off storms which could damage the harvest. After the harvest, however, Jarilo is unfaithful to his wife and she vengefully slays him, returning him to the underworld and renewing enmity between Perun and Veles. Without her husband, god of fertility and vegetation, Morana – and all of nature with her – withers and freezes in the ensuing winter. She grows into the old and dangerous goddess of darkness and frost, eventually dying by the year's end only to be reborn again with her brother in the new year.

=== Wicca and Druidry ===
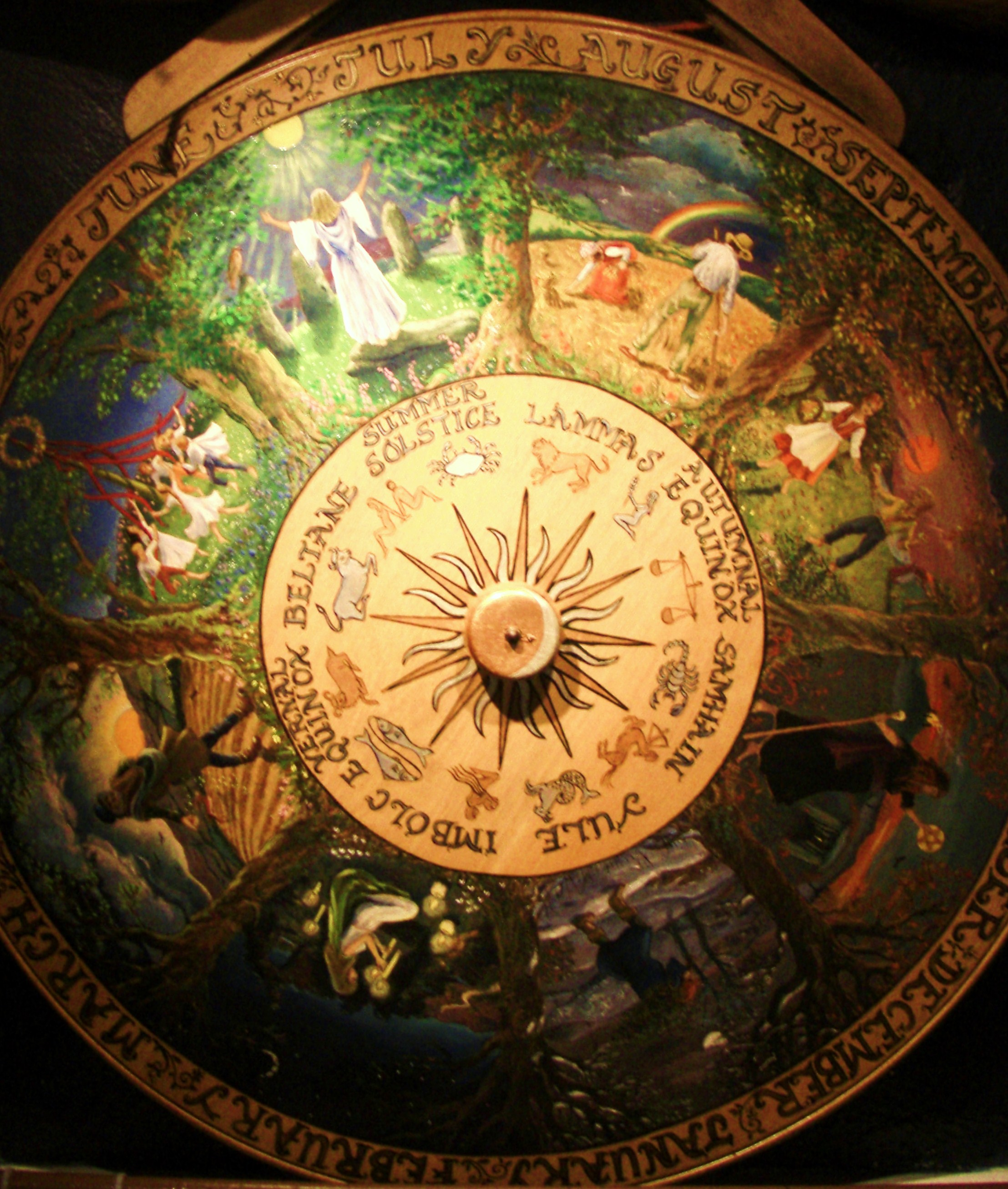
Painted Wheel of the Year from the Museum of Witchcraft, Boscastle

In Wicca, the narrative of the Wheel of the Year traditionally centers on the sacred marriage of the God and the Goddess and the god/goddess duality. In this cycle, the God is perpetually born from the Goddess at Yule, grows in power at the vernal equinox (as does the Goddess, now in her maiden aspect), courts and impregnates the Goddess at Beltane, reaches his peak at the summer solstice, wanes in power at Lammas, passes into the underworld at Samhain (taking with him the fertility of the Goddess/Earth, who is now in her crone aspect) until he is once again born from Her mother/crone aspect at Yule. The Goddess, in turn, ages and rejuvenates endlessly with the seasons, being courted by and giving birth to the Horned God.

Many Wiccan, modern Druids, and eclectic modern pagans incorporate a narrative of the Holly King and Oak King as rulers of the waning year and the waxing year respectively. These two figures battle endlessly with the turning of the seasons. At the summer solstice, the Holly King defeats the Oak King and commences his reign. After the Autumn equinox the Oak King slowly begins to regain his power as the sun begins to wane. Come the winter solstice the Oak King in turn vanquishes the Holly King.After the spring equinox the sun begins to wax again and the Holly King slowly regains his strength until he once again defeats the Oak King at the summer solstice. The two are ultimately seen as essential parts of a whole, light and dark aspects of the male God, and would not exist without each other.

The Holly King is often portrayed as a woodsy figure, similar to the modern Santa Claus, dressed in red with sprigs of holly in his hair and the Oak King as a fertility god.

== See also ==
- Ember days, quarterly periods (usually three days) of prayer and fasting in the liturgical calendar of Western Christian churches.
- List of neo-pagan festivals and events
- Medicine wheel, metaphor for a variety of Native American spiritual concepts
- Solar terms, year's divisions in China and East Asia

=== Calendars ===
- Celtic calendar
  - Gaelic calendar
  - Welsh seasonal festivals
- Germanic calendar
  - Runic calendar
- Hellenic calendars
  - Attic calendar
  - Macedonian calendar
- Roman calendar
  - Roman festivals
