= Pagan Pride =

Movement in American Paganism

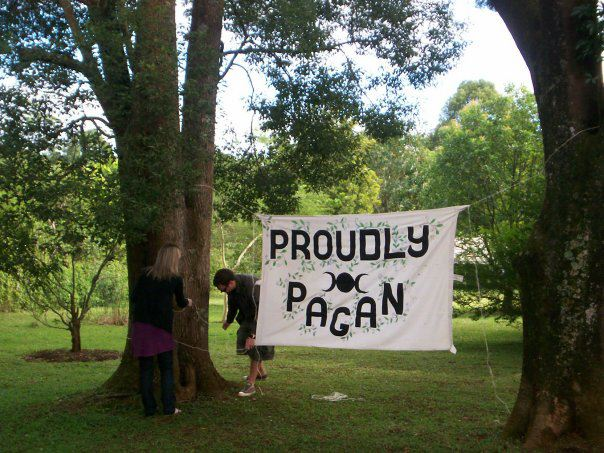
A Pagan pride sign at Pagan Freedom Day in South Africa in 2009.

Pagan Pride is a movement among American pagans to build a positive public image of paganism. Local Pagan Pride groups sponsor "Pagan Pride Day" festivals, usually in public locations such as city parks or university campuses. The first recorded reference to "Pagan Pride" can be traced to 1992.

== The Pagan Pride Project ==
The Pagan Pride Project is an organization whose aims are to promote understanding of paganism, support various charities, and bring pagan communities closer together. The project's logo shows various pagan symbols encircling the Earth—the yin/yang symbol, Celtic cross, Mjöllnir, a Triple Goddess symbol, an Eye of Horus, Venus of Willendorf, ankh, pentagram, triskelion, Stone Megalith, Green Man, Enneagram, and the Kabbalistic Tree of life.

== Pagan Pride Day ==
Pagan Pride Day is an annual event held in a variety of locations across the world. The festivities are as varied as the communities who organize them. Some events are simple open picnics or cook-outs held in a local park; others are full-fledged festivals with rented venues, performance stages, and food facilities. There are, however, several common elements.

First and foremost is the goal of educating the public about the beliefs and practices of various Neopagan traditions. The general public is invited and there are usually tables of reading materials, staffed by members of a range of Neopagan denominations. Speakers or workshops may focus on dispelling common misconceptions about Neopaganism, or may seek to educate outsiders about the details of their particular beliefs and practices.

The second most common aspect is charitable work. Many Pagan Pride coordinating committees choose a local charity to support with fundraising and/or donations raised by the event. These charities might be organizations related to environmental conservation, animal rescues, food pantries, shelters for victims of domestic violence, or related causes.

Pagan Pride Day events are open to the public and generally welcoming to families and children. Hosting a PPD event requires adherence to a range of policies.

Many Pagan Pride festivals showcase local Neopagan performers, artisans, and merchants. Some events offer open mic sessions where attendees might chant, tell jokes, spin tales, drum, or read poetry.
