= Seven Days in New Crete =

1949 novel by Robert Graves

- First edition
- Author: Robert Graves
- Language: English
- Publisher: Cassell
- Publication date: 1949
- Publication place: United Kingdom
- Pages: 281

Seven Days in New Crete, also known as Watch the North Wind Rise, is a seminal future-utopian / dystopian speculative fiction novel by Robert Graves, first published in 1949. It shares many themes and ideas with Graves' The White Goddess, published a year earlier. Martin Seymour-Smith, Graves's biographer, further suggested it was autobiographical, "telling the essential story of his life between 1929 and 1947".

== Summary ==
The novel takes place in a future society (first established on the island of Crete, but later spreading through much of the world) in which most post-medieval technology has been rejected, and a Triple Goddess religion is followed. The book is narrated by a mid-20th century poet, Edward Venn-Thomas, who is resurrected by the New Cretans under orders of their Goddess. Society is organised into five "estates" or social groups: captains, recorders (scribes), commons (by far the most numerous), servants, and magicians or poets (the least numerous), which are analogised to the five fingers of a hand. Different villages practice different marriage customs (strict monogamy, non-strict monogamy, or polyandry), worship different local "godlings", and specialise in various local handcrafts and foodstuffs, but share the common values of the New Cretan civilisation and devotion to the Goddess.

Some of the social customs are somewhat matriarchal. There is no poverty in New Crete (money has been abolished) and little dissatisfaction. War is only known in the form of controlled local one-day conflicts between neighbouring villages, similar to the old game of village football or Shrovetide football. The poets or magicians of New Crete are an integral part of a religion centred on a sometimes capricious Goddess worshipped in three aspects: the maiden archer Nimuë, the goddess of motherhood and sexuality Mari, and the hag-goddess of wisdom Ana. (The names of the last two are similar to those of the Virgin Mary and her mother Saint Anne in Christianity.)

The only masculine elements of New Cretan religion are the rival twin demi-gods (the star-god of the first half of the year and the serpent-god of the second half of the year) who compete for the Goddess's favour, and the local village godlings, who are all far below the Goddess as Queen of Heaven. However, the failings of past fallen civilisations are remembered and personified as an anti-trinity of evil gods (the "three Rogues"): Dobeis, god of money and greed; Pill, god of theft and violence; and Machna, god of science and soulless machinery.

The New Cretan language is derived from Catalan, modified by heavy English-language influence and apparent minor Slavic and Celtic influences. The writing down of words is considered to be too sacred an act to be profaned by ordinary every-day uses, and paper is banned in New Cretan society, and only members of the scribal estate and the poet-magician estate are commonly literate. However, numerical tally-marks are allowed to be used for everyday purposes, and many people of other estates learn to read in later life, after they retire into elder status, and some of the ordinary taboos of New Cretan life are relaxed when in the presence of other elders.

Though Venn-Thomas has been moved in time, he is still in the same area of southern France where he lived before and after World War II, and he compares the conditions in his own time to those under the New Cretan civilisation (mostly to the disfavor of the 20th century, though some things seem "too good to be true").

In this apparently idyllic utopian setting, Venn-Thomas begins to realise that he has been chosen by the Goddess to inject disruption into a society that is becoming static and in danger of losing its vitality. A symptom of trouble is that over the course of the week described in the novel, the five poet-magicians of the "Magic House" of the village of Horned Lamb all die or lose their status as members of the poet-magician estate.

In the last section of the book, Venn-Thomas makes a trip to Dunrena, the town which is the capital of the local kingdom, to witness the twice-yearly ceremony of the changing of the king, carried out as a solemn religious-theatrical performance culminating in a ritual sacrifice similar to those described in The Golden Bough. At the end of the book, Venn-Thomas unleashes the whirlwind which will prepare the way for the transition to the next phase of history, and Sapphire (a young woman for whom he has had unsettled feelings) returns with him through time to be reborn as his daughter.

== Similar works ==
Poul Anderson's 1965 novel The Corridors of Time shares many themes with Graves' book, also including a depiction of a future matriarchal world dominated by a Great Goddess religion seen through the eyes of a traveller from our time. However, Anderson's version of such a world is far more harsh and dystopian, leading the plot to a conclusion very different from Graves'.

== See also ==
- Contributions of Robert Graves to neopaganism
