= Alban Arthan =

Winter solstice druidic festival

In the recent Druidic tradition, Alban Arthan is a seasonal festival at the Winter solstice. The name derives from the writings of Iolo Morganwg, the 19th-century radical poet and forger.

Not on the solstice, but six days after the first new moon, Pliny the Elder claimed that druids would gather by the oldest mistletoe-clad oak. The Chief Druid would make his way to the mistletoe to be cut whilst below, other Druids would hold open a sheet to catch it, making sure none of it touched the ground. With his golden sickle, and in one chop, the Chief Druid would remove the mistletoe to be caught below. This ritual was recorded by Pliny (24-79 CE) in his Natural History (16.24), not as a part of a seasonal festival, but in the context of a sacrifice of two white bulls to invoke prosperity from the gods.

The holiday is observed in a manner that commemorates the death of the Holly King identified with the wren bird (symbolizing the old year and the shortened sun) at the hands of his son and successor, the robin redbreast Oak King (the new year and the new sun that begins to grow). The Battle of the Holly King and Oak King is re-enacted at rituals, both open and closed. The battle is usually in the form of words but there have been some sword battles.

== See also ==
- Winter solstice
- Alban Hefin
- Wren day
- Mummer's Day
