= Selena Fox =

American Wiccan priestess

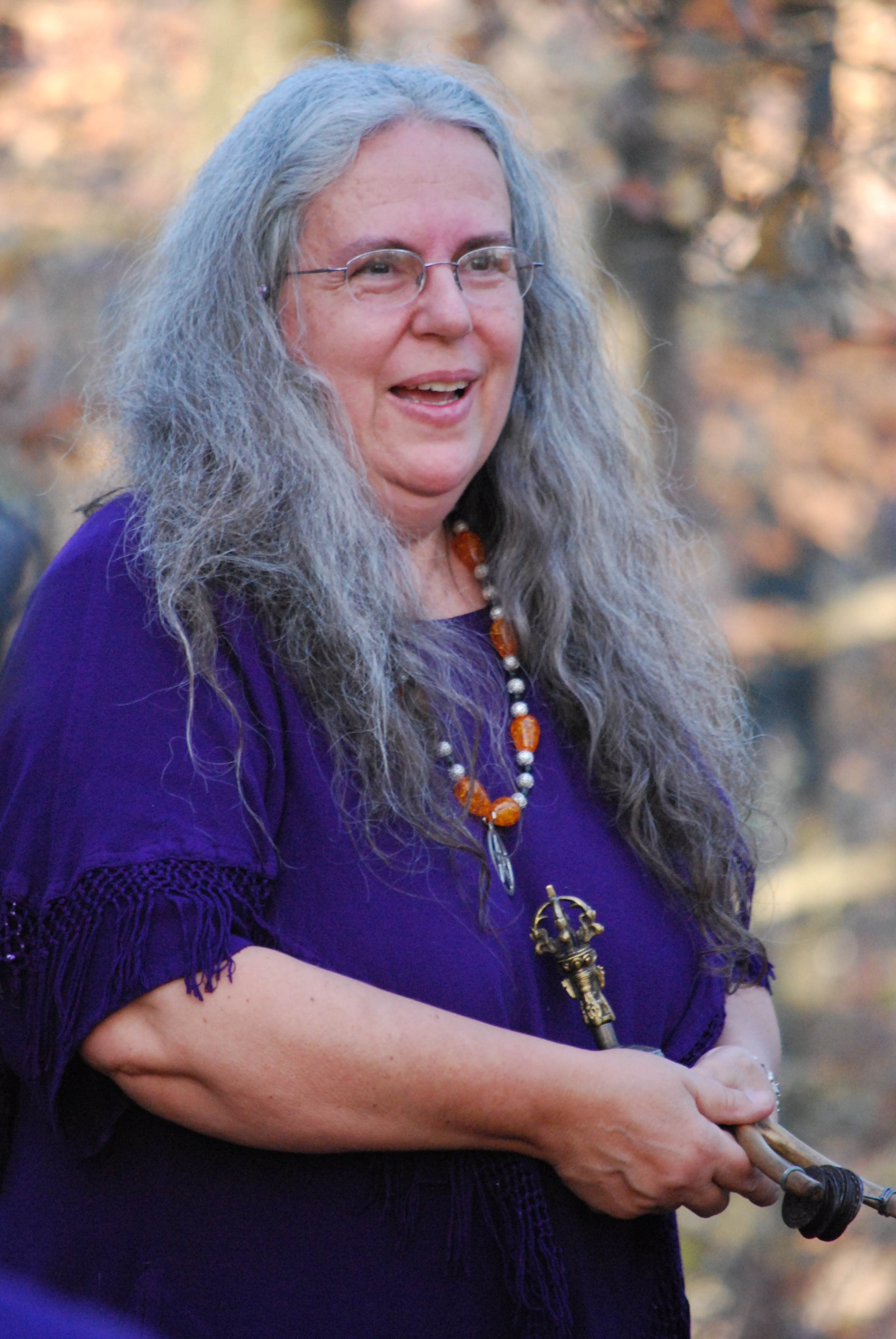
- Born: October 20, 1949 (age 76); Arlington, Virginia
- Occupations: Wiccan priestess psychotherapist
- Spouse: Dennis Carpenter

Selena Fox (born 20 October 1949 in Arlington, Virginia) is a Wiccan priestess, interfaith minister, environmentalist, pagan elder, author, and lecturer in the fields of pagan studies, ecopsychology, and comparative religion.

Fox is a trained counselor and psychotherapist, with a B.S. cum laude in psychology from the College of William & Mary in 1971 and a M.S. in counseling from the University of Wisconsin-Madison in 1995. At the latter she wrote a thesis, When Goddess is God: Pagans, Recovery, and Alcoholics Anonymous (1995). She has been a member of the American Psychological Association, American Counseling Association, Association for Transpersonal Psychology, and American Academy of Religion.

Fox began leading public pagan rituals in 1971 and has done public education about paganism since 1973, in talks and public media interviews. She has also been mentioned in print publications, including a profile in People Magazine in 1979.

Fox has been active in environmental preservation endeavors since helping to organize the first Earth Day on April 22, 1970 and speaks about ecospirituality.

== Circle Sanctuary ==
Fox is the founder of the "Circle Craft" tradition of the Wiccan religion. Along with others, she founded and is the Executive Director of Circle Sanctuary, which is one of America's oldest Pagan centers and Wiccan churches. Circle Sanctuary is headquartered on its 200-acre (0.81 km2) Circle Sanctuary Nature Preserve, founded in 1983. Circle Sanctuary's quarterly journal, Circle Magazine (formerly, Circle Network News) was first published in 1978 as a newsletter, then as a newspaper in 1980, and in magazine format in 1997. Fox also is the founder of the Pagan Spirit Gathering, one of the oldest Nature Spirituality festivals in the United States.

Fox also founded Circle Cemetery in 1995, which is a 20-acre green cemetery for cremains and full-body interment.

== Religious freedom advocacy ==
Fox has advocated for Wiccan religious freedom for religious adherents in the military, including spearheading (along with Americans United for Separation of Church and State) the inclusion of the pentacle symbol on the US Department of Veterans Affairs list of emblems of belief that can be included on government-issued markers, headstones, and plaques honoring deceased veterans.

She has also advocated for equal treatment of religion in the public square, including the inclusion of a pentacle in a holiday display at the Green Bay, Wisconsin City Hall and in displays at the Wisconsin state Capitol for the annual Interfaith Awareness Week, as well as addressing derogatory comments made by Delaware GOP Senate candidate Christine O'Donnell during her candidacy.

== Bibliography ==
=== Contributor ===
- Rosemary Skinner Keller and Rosemary Radford Ruether, ed. (2006). Encyclopedia of Women and Religion in North America. Indiana University Press. ISBN 0253346851.
- J. Gordon Melton and Martin Baumann, ed. (2002). Religions of the World. ABC-CLIO, Inc. ISBN 159884203X.
- Shelley Rabinovitch & James Lewis, ed. (2002). The Encyclopedia of Modern Witchcraft and Neo-Paganism. Citadel Press. ISBN 0806524065.

=== Periodicals ===
- Circle Guide to Pagan Resources. Editor, directory, 1979–present, Circle Publications.
- Circle Magazine (formerly Circle Network News). Founding Editor, Advisor, 1978–present, Circle Publications.

=== Books and articles ===
- Celebrating the Seasons. On-line guide with rituals, chants, articles - www.circlesanctuary.org/index.php/education/celebrating-the-seasons.html
- Circle Magick Songs (1979) with Jim Alan. Circle Publications.
- Goddess Communion: Rituals and Meditations (1988). Circle Publications.
- Planetary Healing Rituals: Meditations, Rituals & Prayers for a Healthier World (1991). Circle Sanctuary.

=== Recordings ===
- Circle Craft Podcasts - recordings of weekly classes, meditations, & rituals on internet radio at circlepodcasts.org
- Sacred Cave Ritual - Selena Fox and Pagan Spirit Gathering Community, ritual with chanting & guided meditation, 1995
- Magical Journeys - Selena Fox, guided meditation, 1981
- Songs of Pagan Folk - Jim Alan, Selena Fox and Friends, songs and chants, 1980
- Circle Magick Music - Jim Alan and Selena Fox, songs and chants, 1976

== General references ==
- Hopman, Ellen Evert; Lawrence Bond (1996). "Circle Sanctuary". People of the Earth: The New Pagans Speak Out. Rochester, Vermont: Destiny Books. pp. 236–244. ISBN 0-89281-559-0.
- Vale, V. and John Sulak (2001). Modern Pagans. San Francisco: RE/Search Publications. ISBN 1-889307-10-6. p. 201 - One page interview with Fox about Circle Sanctuary
