= Pagan Spirit Gathering =

Festival in the United States

Pagan Spirit Gathering (PSG) is a nature spirituality festival organized by Circle Sanctuary. First held in 1980, it has grown into one of the oldest and largest such events in the United States. The gathering is held Sunday to Sunday during the week near the summer solstice, forming a temporary Pagan town each year.

Festivals were first held in Richland County, Wisconsin, but outgrew the facilities and moved in 1997 to a location near Athens, Ohio, at Wisteria. PSG moved to Camp Zoe near Salem, Missouri in 2009, then to Stonehouse Farm near Earlville, Illinois in 2011. After a flash flood caused PSG 2015 to close early, PSG moved to Tall Tree Lake near Vienna, Illinois.

The gathering went virtual in 2020 and 2021 as a result of the COVID-19 pandemic.
