= Heinlein (crater) =

Crater on Mars

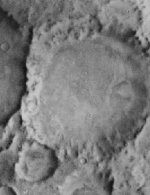
- Planet: Mars
- Region: Promethei Terra
- Coordinates: 64.6°S 243.8°W
- Quadrangle: Hellas
- Diameter: 83 km
- Eponym: Robert A. Heinlein

Heinlein is a crater in Promethei Terra, in the southeast end of the Hellas quadrangle of Mars. Centered at 65.2 degrees south, 114.64 degrees west, it is 85.34 km in diameter. It is named after Robert A. Heinlein, a leading science fiction author.

Heinlein helped to narrate the Moon landing with Walter Cronkite on CBS in 1969. He was involved in the planning of the Star Wars Defense program in the 1980s. Several of his novels involve Mars, especially Stranger in a Strange Land, Red Planet, Podkayne of Mars and Double Star. Many NASA officials say that his works inspired them to enter the space industry.
