= Heinlein Prize for Advances in Space Commercialization =

The Heinlein Prize for Advances in Space Commercialization, generally known as the Heinlein Prize, was founded in 1988 to reward individuals who make practical contributions to the commercialization of space. The Heinlein Prize offers a cash award of $500,000 to one or more individuals for practical accomplishments in the field of commercial space activities awarded by the Heinlein Prize Trust.

Trustees for the award emphasize that the prize, which will be given as often as annually, is for effort by an individual or group of people, not government or corporate sponsored activities, and is intended to be worldwide in scope. The prize is awarded in July.

The Heinlein Prize honors the memory of Robert A. Heinlein, one of the most popular science fiction writers of the 20th century. The trust was established soon after his death in 1988 by his widow, Virginia Gerstenfeld Heinlein, whose estate will fund the prize.

== Winners ==
Source: Heinlein Prize Trust

- 2006 - Peter Diamandis, for accomplishments in commercial space activities
- 2011 - Elon Musk, for advances in space commercialization
- 2016 - Jeff Bezos, for his vision and leadership in commercial space activities that have led to historic firsts and reusability in the commercial spaceflight industry

== See also ==
- List of space technology awards
- Private spaceflight
