= Grumbles from the Grave =

1989 autobiography of Robert A. Heinlein collated by Virginia Heinlein

- First edition
- Author: Robert A. Heinlein
- Cover artist: Michael Whelan
- Language: English
- Subject: Autobiography and biography
- Publisher: Del Rey
- Publication date: 1989
- Publication place: United States
- Media type: Print (hardcover and paperback)

Grumbles from the Grave is a posthumous 1989 autobiographical work by science fiction author Robert A. Heinlein, collated by his wife Virginia Heinlein from his notes and writings. The work is the closest that Heinlein came to writing an autobiography. It contains a wide range of correspondence, notes and memoirs, and was published a year and a half after his death.

== Contents ==
Grumbles from the Grave provides insight into Heinlein's writing process (and the editorial/publishing process with which he was often at odds). In addition, it contains evidence of his philosophy as applied to his life and personal opinions. Beginning with a short biography of Robert by Virginia, the bulk of the book consists of excerpts of correspondence from the period from 1939 to 1970, from when he began writing science fiction until the onset of his first major illness. There is considerable information provided into how the 13-year gestation of Heinlein's novel Stranger in a Strange Land evolved. Additionally there is the original postlude to Podkayne of Mars and a discussion of cuts made to his novel Red Planet.

== Criticisms ==
Frederik Pohl has complained "Robert had talked about allowing posthumous publication of his real feelings about a lot of things that he didn’t feel comfortable to talk about while he was alive, and indicated that some of his private letters would be a source for the book. Then some posthumous book with that title did come out, and it was a great disappointment. Someone — it could have been only [Virginia Heinlein] — had washed his face and combed his hair and turned whatever it was that Robert might have wanted to say into the equivalent of thank-you notes for a respectable English tea. I know that Robert wrote some much more raunchy letters than any of those, because I myself got one or two. But all the raunch has been edited out. What’s left is actually rather boring and does a great disservice to the real Heinlein, whose physical person may have been embodied as a conventional hard-right conservative but whose writing was — sometimes vulgarly — that of a free-thinking iconoclast".

== Awards and honors ==
The book was a finalist for the 1990 Hugo Award for Best Non-Fiction Book. The book won the 1990 Locus Award for Best Non-fiction.
