= Malea Planum =

Plain on Mars

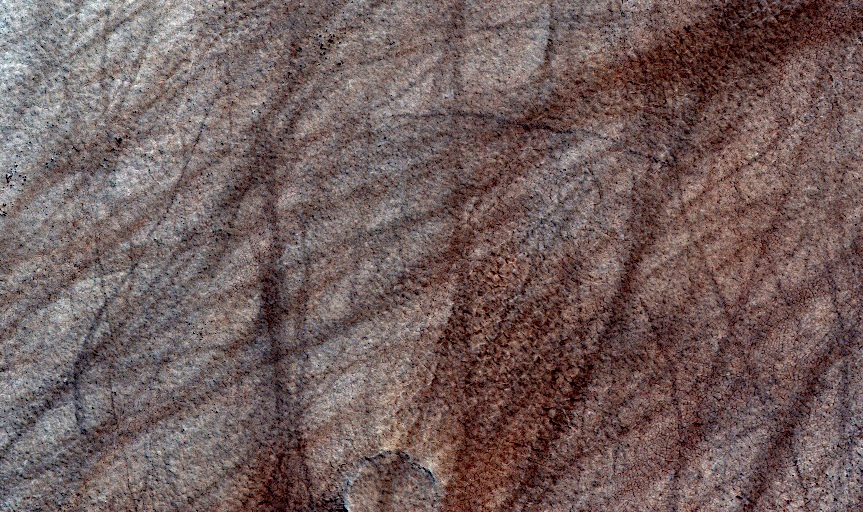
- A muted Crater on Malea Planum
- Feature type: Plateau
- Diameter: 872 km

Malea Planum is a high volcanic plateau on the planet Mars located in the Noachis, Hellas and Mare Australe quadrangles, southwest of the Hellas Planitia impact basin. With an area of 900 × 1,200 km², it is centered by 64.8°S and 65°E, limited to the north by Hellas Planitia, to the west by Sisyphi Planum, to the south by Planum Australe and to the east by Promethei Terra.
