= Our Noble, Essential Decency =

1952 essay written by A. Heinlein

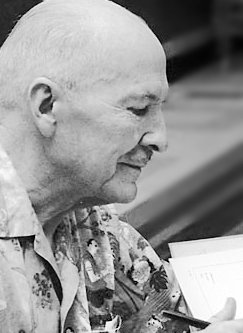
Robert Anson Heinlein signing autographs at Worldcon 1976

This I Believe: Our Noble, Essential Decency is an essay written and recorded by Robert A. Heinlein in 1952, as part of the Edward R. Murrow's series "This I Believe" on the CBS Radio Network, generally seen as the most popular of that series.

== The essay ==
Heinlein's essay differs from others in the series by focusing on Heinlein's belief in "my fellow man", naming individuals and communities in the United States in general.

He starts out by saying he's not going to discuss religious beliefs, but "matters so obvious that it has gone out of style to mention them."

Initially, he mentions specific people, his neighbors, mentioning by name a local pastor of a different denomination than himself and the local veterinarian, and describing their charitable behavior. He goes on to say:

I believe in my townspeople. You can knock on any door in our town, say "I'm hungry," and you’ll be fed. Our town is no exception. I found the same ready charity everywhere. For the one who says, "The heck with you, I’ve got mine," there are a hundred, a thousand, who will say, "Sure pal, sit down." I know that despite all warnings against hitchhikers, I can step to the highway, thumb for a ride, and in a few minutes a car or a truck will stop and someone will say, "Climb in Mack. How far you going?"
I believe in my fellow citizens. Our headlines are splashed with crime. Yet for every criminal, there are ten thousand honest, decent, kindly men. If it were not so, no child would live to grow up. Business could not go on from day to day. Decency is not news. It is buried in the obituaries, but it is a force stronger than crime.

He then names the members of a number of professions seen as serving the public good, like nurses and craftsmen. He makes the unusual assertion (both for the times, and considering his own libertarian ideals) of saying he believes in most politicians. Most.

A noteworthy entry in his list is Rodger Young, a Medal of Honor recipient from WWII and the kickoff for his inclusion of "unnamed heroes from Valley Forge to the Yalu River", and his general pride in being an American.

But the essay is also seen as noteworthy in his subsequent inclusion of "my whole race—yellow, white, black, red, brown—in the honesty, courage, intelligence, durability, and goodness of the overwhelming majority of my brothers and sisters everywhere on this planet. I am proud to be a human being."

== Reception ==
Generally the best-received entry in the series, Heinlein's essay has continued to be cited as a favorite, according to the This I Believe, Inc., which still promotes the series and cultivates new essays.

It was published as "This I Believe", in the 1992 Heinlein anthology, Requiem, in the audiobook version read by his widow Virginia Heinlein.
