= Tramp Royale =

1992 nonfiction travelogue by Robert A. Heinlein

- First edition
- Author: Robert A. Heinlein
- Cover artist: Kirk Reinert
- Language: English
- Subject: Travel
- Publisher: Ace Books
- Publication date: 1992
- Publication place: United States
- Media type: Print (hardback & paperback)
- ISBN: 978-0-441-82184-6

Tramp Royale is a nonfiction travelogue by science fiction writer Robert A. Heinlein, describing how he and his wife, Ginny, went around the world by ship and plane between 1953 and 1954. It was published posthumously in 1992, and subsequently went out of print.

Much of the book is devoted to social and political commentary and observation, including two lengthy but half-hearted defenses of the McCarthy hearings, about which the Heinleins were interrogated repeatedly in the countries they visited. Although Heinlein has been adopted as somewhat of a posterboy by the libertarian movement, the political commentary reveals that Heinlein was far from being a doctrinaire adherent of any particular political philosophy. For example, he compares the social welfare state of New Zealand unfavorably to that of Uruguay and says that he cannot explain why the one was so much more successful than the other.

Heinlein devoted an entire chapter to his (almost) visit to Tristan da Cunha, arguably the most remote human settlement on Earth. He described the islands as being so far from the rest of human civilization that the next closest human settlement, St. Helena, "[is] itself so remote that it was picked as a safe prison for Napoleon Bonaparte after he crushed his way out of Elba". Tristan da Cunha is 2,430 km (1,510 mi) from St. Helena.

This trip, along with Heinlein's experiences as a naval officer, appears to have provided a great deal of the background material for some of Heinlein's science fiction novels, such as passenger liners used in Podkayne of Mars (in space) and in Job: A Comedy of Justice (on the oceans). Much of the humor in the book consists of riffs on the idea that Ginny is the hothead, while Robert is the easygoing one. For example, in a shipboard incident at the captain's table, Robert continues eating his dessert after being doused in salad during a food fight started by Ginny.
