= Take Back Your Government =

1992 nonfiction book by Robert Heinlein

- Author: Robert A. Heinlein
- Language: English
- Genre: Government
- Publisher: Baen
- Publication date: 1992
- Publication place: United States
- Media type: Print (hardcover & paperback)
- Pages: 304 pp.
- ISBN: 0-671-72157-7
- OCLC: 26811497
- LC Class: MLC R CP01123

Take Back Your Government!: A Practical Handbook for the Private Citizen Who Wants Democracy to Work is an early work by science fiction author Robert A. Heinlein. It was published in 1992, after his death in 1988.

Originally entitled How to Be a Politician, the book was written in 1946 but never found a publisher, perhaps due to excess candor. As with many of Heinlein's other works, he wrote what he knew. In this case, he based the work on his experience in California politics in the 1930s, particularly his efforts on behalf of Upton Sinclair's End Poverty in California (EPIC) movement and Sinclair's attempt to become the Democratic nominee for governor of California in 1934.

The book contains annotations by Jerry Pournelle, who had little time to finish, polish, or fact-check, because the publishers demanded the work be available during Ross Perot's campaign for president.

A new edition was published in 2012, with an introduction by Heinlein biographer William H. Patterson Jr.

== Editions ==
- August 1992, Baen Books, paperback, 304pp, ISBN 0-671-72157-7
- January 2012, Phoenix Pick, trade paperback, 246pp, ISBN 978-1-61242-061-5
