= Robert A. Heinlein =

American author and engineer (1907–1988)

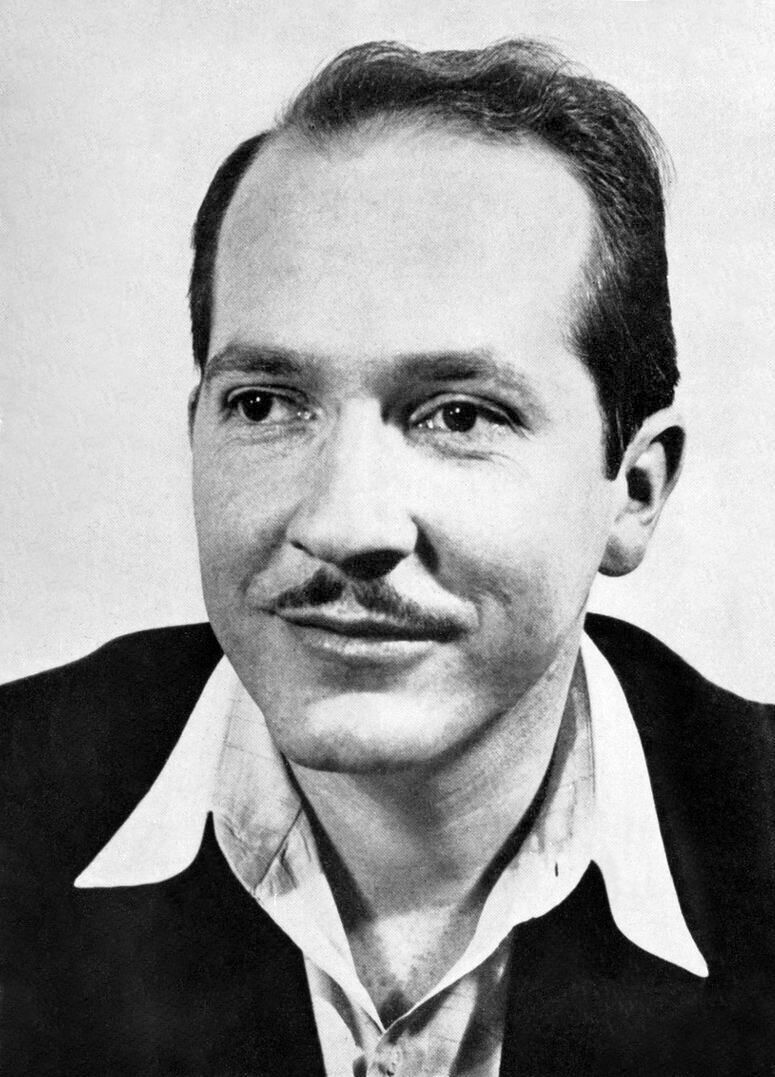
- Heinlein c. 1950
- Born: Robert Anson Heinlein; July 7, 1907; Butler, Missouri, U.S.
- Died: May 8, 1988 (aged 80); Carmel-by-the-Sea, California, U.S.
- Education: United States Naval Academy; University of California, Los Angeles (incomplete)
- Occupations: Author; engineer; lieutenant USN
- Spouses: Elinor Curry (m. 1929; div. 1930) Leslyn MacDonald (m. 1932; div. 1947) Virginia Gerstenfeld (m. 1948)
- Writing career
- Pen name: Anson MacDonald; Lyle Monroe; John Riverside; Caleb Saunders; Simon York
- Period: 1939–1988
- Genres: Science fiction, fantasy
- Notable works: Stranger in a Strange Land; The Moon Is a Harsh Mistress; Starship Troopers; Time Enough for Love
- Military career
- Allegiance: United States
- Branch: United States Navy
- Service years: 1929–1934
- Rank: Lieutenant
- Units: USS Lexington; USS Roper

Robert Anson Heinlein (/ˈhaɪnlaɪn/ HYNE-lyne; July 7, 1907 – May 8, 1988) was an American science fiction author, engineer, and naval officer. Sometimes called the "dean of science fiction writers", he was among the first to emphasize scientific accuracy in his fiction and was thus a pioneer of the subgenre of hard science fiction. His published works, both fiction and non-fiction, express admiration for competence and emphasize the value of critical thinking. His plots often presented provocative situations which challenged conventional social mores. His work continues to have an influence on the science fiction genre and on modern culture more generally.

Heinlein became one of the first American science fiction writers to break into mainstream magazines such as The Saturday Evening Post in the late 1940s. He was one of the best-selling science fiction novelists for many decades. Heinlein, Isaac Asimov, and Arthur C. Clarke were often considered the "Big Three" of English-language science fiction authors. Notable Heinlein works include Stranger in a Strange Land, Starship Troopers (which helped mold the space marine and mecha archetypes) and The Moon Is a Harsh Mistress. His work sometimes had controversial aspects, such as plural marriage in The Moon Is a Harsh Mistress, militarism in Starship Troopers and technologically competent women characters who were formidable, yet often stereotypically feminine—such as Friday.

Heinlein used his science fiction as a way to explore provocative social and political ideas and to speculate how progress in science and engineering might shape the future of politics, race, religion, and sex. Within the framework of his stories, Heinlein repeatedly addressed certain social themes: the importance of individual liberty and self-reliance, the nature of sexual relationships, the obligations individuals owe to their societies, the influence of organized religion on culture and government, and the tendency of society to repress nonconformist thought. He also speculated on the influence of space travel on human cultural practices.

Heinlein was heavily influenced by the visionary writers and philosophers of his day. William H. Patterson Jr., writing in Robert A. Heinlein: In Dialogue with His Century, states that by 1930, Heinlein was a progressive liberal who had spent some time in the open sexuality climate of New York's Jazz Age Greenwich Village. Heinlein believed that some level of socialism was inevitable and was already occurring in the United States; as a young man he was absorbing the social concepts of writers such as H. G. Wells and Upton Sinclair. Heinlein adopted many of the progressive social beliefs of his day and projected them forward. In later years, he began to espouse more moderate views and to believe that a strong world government was the only way to avoid mutual nuclear annihilation.

Heinlein was named the first Science Fiction Writers Grand Master in 1974. Four of his novels won Hugo Awards. In addition, fifty years after publication, seven of his works were awarded "Retro Hugos"—awards given retrospectively for works that were published before the Hugo Awards came into existence. In his fiction, Heinlein coined terms that have become part of the English language, including grok, waldo and speculative fiction, as well as popularizing existing terms like "TANSTAAFL", "pay it forward", and "space marine". He also anticipated mechanical computer-aided design with "Drafting Dan" in his novel The Door into Summer and described a modern version of a waterbed in his novel Stranger in a Strange Land.

== Life ==
=== Birth, childhood, and early education ===
Heinlein, born on July 7, 1907, to Rex Ivar Heinlein (an accountant) and Bam Lyle Heinlein, in Butler, Missouri, was the third of seven children. He was a sixth-generation German-American; a family tradition had it that Heinleins fought in every American war, starting with the War of Independence.

He spent his childhood in Kansas City, Missouri. The outlook and values of this time and place (in his own words, "The Bible Belt") had an influence on his fiction, especially in his later works, as he drew heavily upon his childhood in establishing the setting and cultural atmosphere in Time Enough for Love and To Sail Beyond the Sunset. The 1910 return of Halley's Comet inspired the young child's life-long interest in astronomy.

In January 1924, the sixteen-year-old Heinlein lied about his age to enlist in Company C, 110th Engineer Regiment, of the Missouri National Guard, in Kansas City. His family could not afford to send Heinlein to college, so he sought an appointment to a military academy. When Heinlein graduated from Kansas City Central High School in 1924, he was initially prevented from attending the United States Naval Academy at Annapolis because his older brother Rex was a student there, and at the time, regulations discouraged multiple family members from attending the academy simultaneously. He instead matriculated at Kansas City Junior College and began vigorously petitioning Missouri Senator James A. Reed for an appointment to the Naval Academy. In part due to the influence of the Pendergast machine, the Naval Academy admitted him in June 1925. Heinlein received his discharge from the Missouri National Guard as a staff sergeant. Reed later told Heinlein that he had received 100 letters of recommendation for nomination to the Naval Academy, 50 for other candidates and 50 for Heinlein.

=== Navy ===
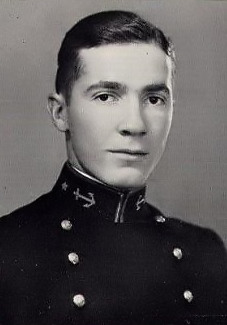
Midshipman Heinlein, from the 1929 U.S. Naval Academy yearbook

Heinlein's experience in the U.S. Navy exerted a strong influence on his character and writing. In 1929, he graduated from the Naval Academy with the equivalent of a bachelor of arts in engineering. (At that time, the academy did not confer degrees.) He ranked fifth in his class academically but with a class standing of 20th of 243 due to disciplinary demerits. The U.S. Navy commissioned him as an ensign shortly after his graduation. He advanced to lieutenant junior grade in 1931 while serving aboard the new aircraft carrier USS Lexington, where he worked in radio communications—a technology then still in its earlier stages. The captain of this carrier, Ernest J. King, later served as the Chief of Naval Operations and Commander-in-Chief, U.S. Fleet during World War II. Military historians twice interviewed Heinlein during his later years and asked him about Captain King and his service as the commander of the U.S. Navy's first modern aircraft carrier. Heinlein also served as gunnery officer aboard the destroyer USS Roper in 1933 and 1934, reaching the rank of lieutenant. His brother, Lawrence Heinlein, served in the U.S. Army, the U.S. Air Force, and the Missouri National Guard, reaching the rank of major general in the National Guard.

=== Marriages ===
In 1929, Heinlein married Elinor Curry of Kansas City. However, their marriage lasted only about one year. His second marriage, to Leslyn MacDonald (1904–1981) in 1932, lasted 15 years. MacDonald was, according to the testimony of Heinlein's Navy friend, Rear Admiral Cal Laning, "astonishingly intelligent, widely read, and extremely liberal, though a registered Republican", while Isaac Asimov later recalled that Heinlein was, at the time, "a flaming liberal". (See section: Politics of Robert Heinlein.)

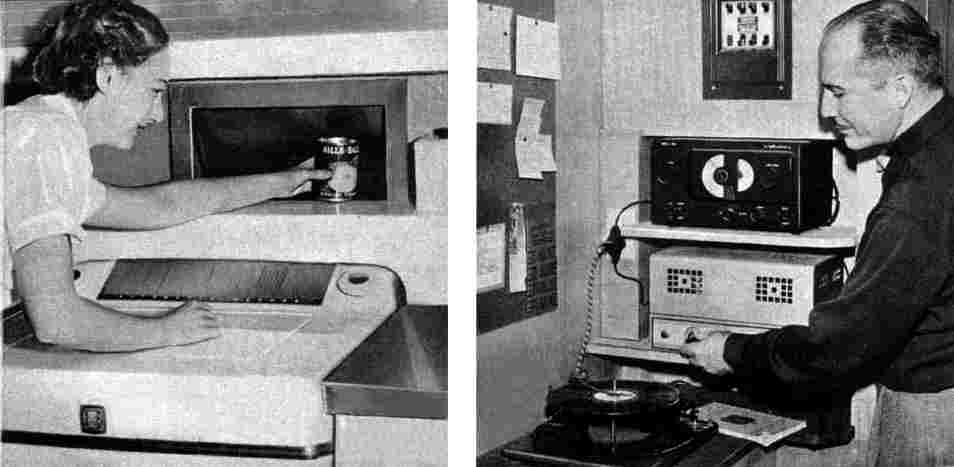
Virginia and Robert Heinlein in a 1952 Popular Mechanics article, titled "A House to Make Life Easy". The Heinleins, both engineers, designed the house for themselves with many innovative features.

At the Philadelphia Naval Shipyard, Heinlein met and befriended a chemical engineer named Virginia "Ginny" Gerstenfeld. After the war, her engagement having fallen through, she attended UCLA for doctoral studies in chemistry, and while there reconnected with Heinlein. As his second wife's alcoholism gradually spun out of control, Heinlein moved out and the couple filed for divorce. Heinlein's friendship with Virginia turned into a relationship and on October 21, 1948—shortly after the decree nisi came through—they married in the town of Raton, New Mexico. Soon thereafter, they set up housekeeping in the Broadmoor district of Colorado Springs, Colorado, in a house that Heinlein and his wife designed. As the area was newly developed, they were allowed to choose their own house number, 1776 Mesa Avenue. The design of the house was featured in Popular Mechanics. They remained married until Heinlein's death. In 1965, after various chronic health problems of Virginia's were traced back to altitude sickness, they moved to Santa Cruz, California, which is at sea level. Robert and Virginia designed and built a new residence, circular in shape, in the nearby village of Bonny Doon.

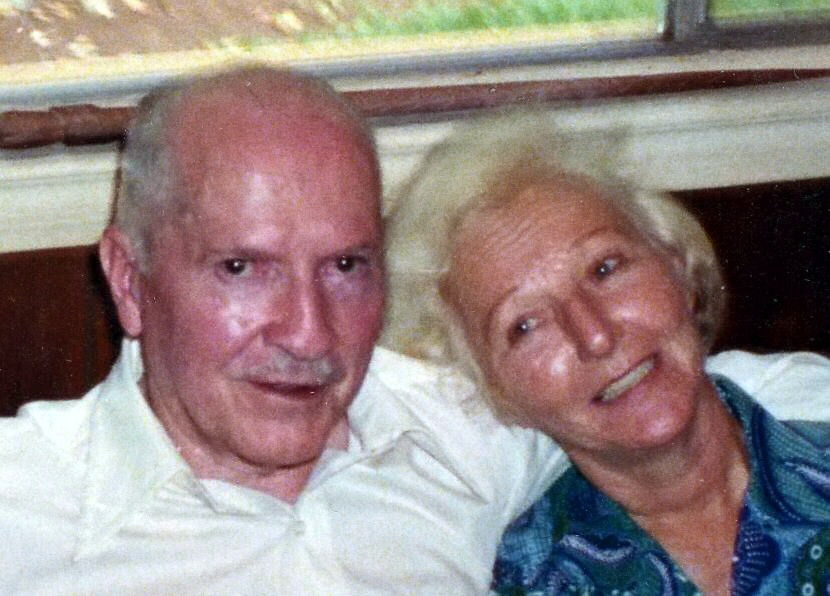
Robert and Virginia Heinlein in Tahiti, 1980

Ginny undoubtedly served as a model for many of his intelligent, fiercely independent female characters. She was a chemist and rocket test engineer, and held a higher rank in the Navy than Heinlein himself. She was also an accomplished college athlete, earning four varsity letters. In 1953–1954, the Heinleins voyaged around the world (mostly via ocean liners and cargo liners, as Ginny detested flying), which Heinlein described in Tramp Royale. The trip provided background material for science fiction novels set aboard spaceships on long voyages, such as Podkayne of Mars, Friday and Job: A Comedy of Justice, the latter initially being set on a cruise much as detailed in Tramp Royale. Ginny acted as the first reader of his manuscripts. Isaac Asimov believed that Heinlein made a swing to the right politically at the same time he married Ginny.

=== California ===
In 1934, Heinlein was discharged from the Navy, owing to pulmonary tuberculosis. During a lengthy hospitalization, and inspired by his own experience while bed-ridden, he developed a design for a waterbed.

After his discharge, Heinlein attended a few weeks of graduate classes in mathematics and physics at the University of California, Los Angeles (UCLA), but he soon quit, either because of his ill-health or because of a desire to enter politics.

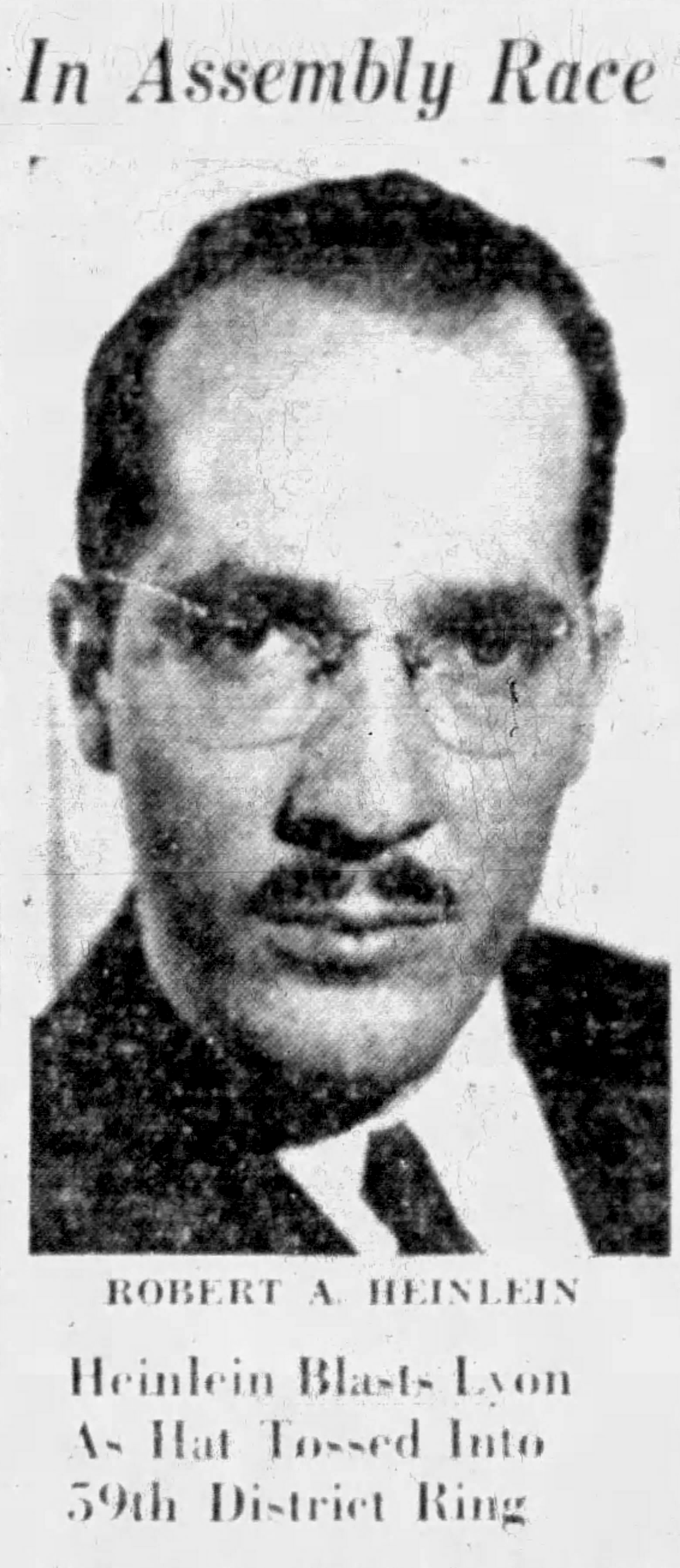
Heinlein as a candidate for California State Assembly, 1938

Heinlein supported himself at several occupations, including real estate sales and silver mining, but for some years found money in short supply. Heinlein was active in Upton Sinclair's socialist End Poverty in California movement (EPIC) in the early 1930s. He was deputy publisher of the EPIC News, which Heinlein noted "recalled a mayor, kicked out a district attorney, replaced the governor with one of our choice." When Sinclair gained the Democratic nomination for Governor of California in 1934, Heinlein worked actively in the campaign. Heinlein himself ran for the California State Assembly in 1938, but was unsuccessful. He was running as a left-wing Democrat in a conservative district, and was defeated in the Democratic primary by fewer than 500 votes out of over 10,000 cast.

=== Author ===
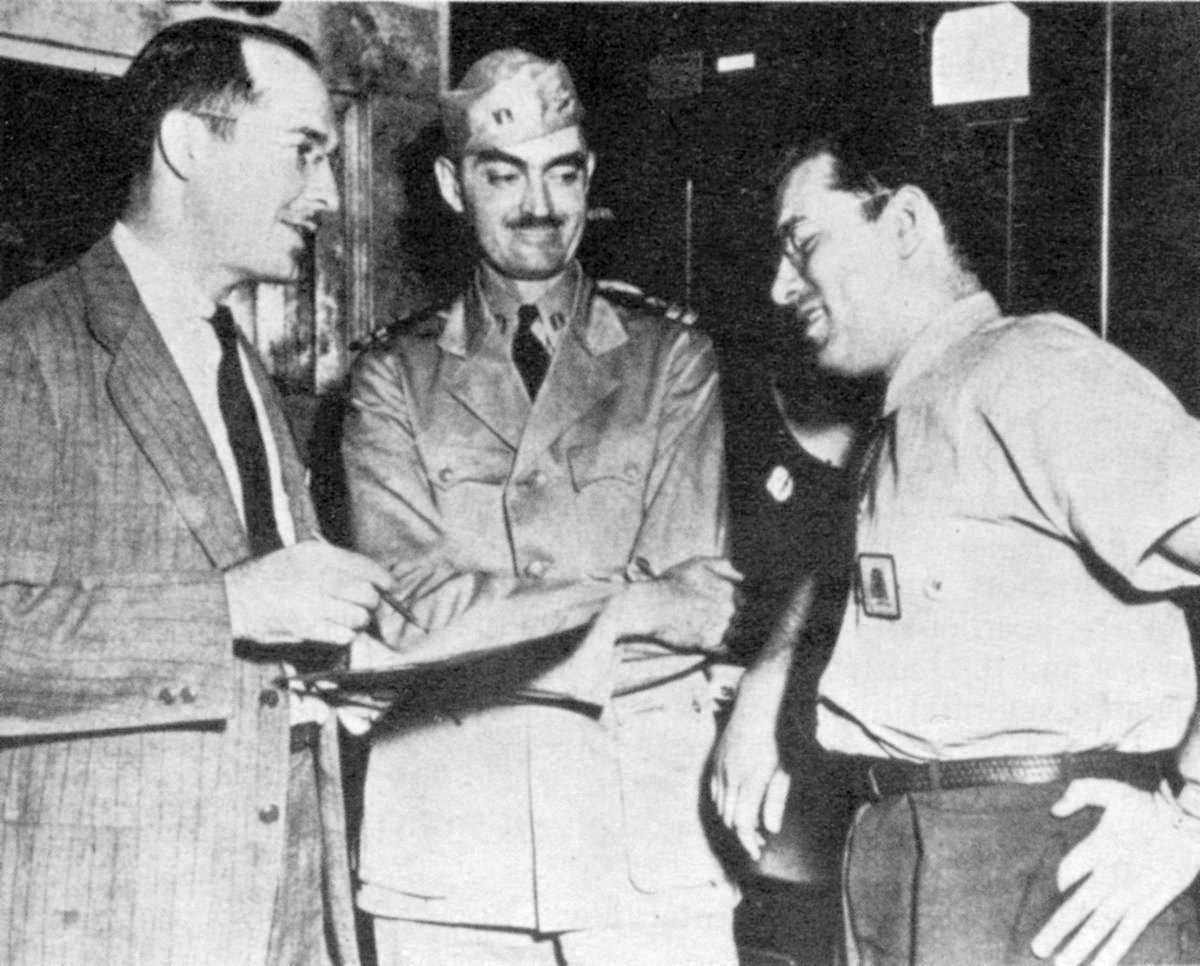
Robert A. Heinlein, L. Sprague de Camp, and Isaac Asimov, Philadelphia Navy Yard, 1944

While not destitute after the campaign—he had a small disability pension from the Navy—Heinlein turned to writing to pay off his mortgage. His first published story, "Life-Line", was printed in the August 1939 issue of Astounding Science Fiction. Originally written for a contest, it sold to Astounding for significantly more than the contest's first-prize payoff. Another Future History story, "Misfit", followed in November. Some saw Heinlein's talent and stardom from his first story, and he was quickly acknowledged as a leader of the new movement toward "social" science fiction. In California he hosted the Mañana Literary Society, a 1940–41 series of informal gatherings of new authors. He was the guest of honor at Denvention, the 1941 Worldcon, held in Denver. During World War II, Heinlein was employed by the Navy and listed in the Naval Register on the "retired list" as a lieutenant while serving in the Naval Civil-Service at the Navy Aircraft Materials Center at the Philadelphia Naval Shipyard in Pennsylvania. Heinlein recruited Isaac Asimov and L. Sprague de Camp to also work there. While at the Philadelphia Naval Shipyards, Asimov, Heinlein, and de Camp brainstormed unconventional approaches to kamikaze attacks, such as using sound to detect approaching planes.

As the war wound down in 1945, Heinlein began to re-evaluate his career. The atomic bombings of Hiroshima and Nagasaki, along with the outbreak of the Cold War, galvanized him to write nonfiction on political topics. In addition, he wanted to break into better-paying markets. He published four influential short stories for The Saturday Evening Post magazine, leading off, in February 1947, with "The Green Hills of Earth". That made him the first science fiction writer to break out of the "pulp ghetto". In 1950, the movie Destination Moon—the documentary-like film for which he had written the story and scenario, co-written the script, and invented many of the effects—won an Academy Award for special effects.

Heinlein created SF stories with social commentary about relationships. In 1951 alien invasion novel The Puppet Masters, Sam persuades fellow operative Mary to marry him. At the county clerk, they are offered a variety of marriage possibilities: "Term, renewable or lifetime", as short as six months or as long as forever.

Also, he embarked on a series of juvenile novels for the Charles Scribner's Sons publishing company that went from 1947 through 1959, at the rate of one book each autumn, in time for Christmas presents to teenagers. He also wrote for Boys' Life in 1952.

Heinlein used topical materials throughout his juvenile series beginning in 1947, but in 1958 he interrupted work on The Heretic (the working title of Stranger in a Strange Land) to write and publish a book exploring ideas of civic virtue, initially serialized as Starship Soldiers. In 1959, his novel (now entitled Starship Troopers) was considered by the editors and owners of Scribner's to be too controversial for one of its prestige lines, and it was rejected. Heinlein found another publisher (Putnam), feeling himself released from the constraints of writing novels for children. He had told an interviewer that he did not want to do stories that merely added to categories defined by other works. Rather he wanted to do his own work, stating that: "I want to do my own stuff, my own way". He wrote a series of challenging books that redrew the boundaries of science fiction, including Stranger in a Strange Land (1961) and The Moon Is a Harsh Mistress (1966).

=== Later life and death ===
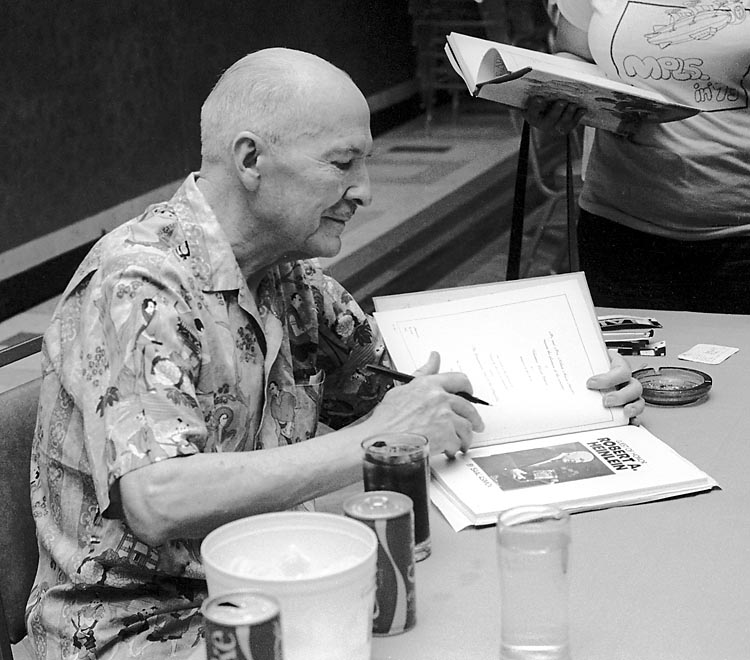
Heinlein autographs one of his works, 1976

Beginning in 1970, Heinlein had a series of health crises, broken by strenuous periods of activity in his hobby of stonemasonry: in a private correspondence, he referred to that as his "usual and favorite occupation between books". The decade began with a life-threatening attack of peritonitis, recovery from which required more than two years, and treatment of which required multiple transfusions of Heinlein's rare blood type, A2 negative. As soon as he was well enough to write again, he began work on Time Enough for Love (1973), which introduced many of the themes found in his later fiction.

In the mid-1970s, Heinlein wrote two articles for the Britannica Compton Yearbook. He and Ginny crisscrossed the country helping to reorganize blood donation in the United States in an effort to assist the system which had saved his life. At science fiction conventions to receive his autograph, fans would be asked to co-sign with Heinlein a beautifully embellished pledge form he supplied stating that the recipient agrees that they will donate blood. He was the guest of honor at the Worldcon in 1976 for the third time at MidAmeriCon in Kansas City, Missouri. At that Worldcon, Heinlein hosted a blood drive and donors' reception to thank all those who had helped save lives.

Beginning in 1977, and including an episode while vacationing in Tahiti in early 1978, he had episodes of reversible neurologic dysfunction due to transient ischemic attacks. Over the next few months, he became more and more exhausted, and his health again began to decline. The problem was determined to be a blocked carotid artery, and he had one of the earliest known carotid bypass operations to correct it.

In 1980, Robert Heinlein was a member of the Citizen's Advisory Council on National Space Policy, chaired by Jerry Pournelle, which met at the home of SF writer Larry Niven to write space policy papers for the incoming Reagan administration. Members included such aerospace industry leaders as former astronaut Buzz Aldrin, General Daniel O. Graham, aerospace engineer Max Hunter and North American Rockwell VP for Space Shuttle development George Merrick. Policy recommendations from the Council included ballistic missile defense concepts which were later transformed into what was called the Strategic Defense Initiative. Heinlein assisted with Council contribution to the Reagan SDI spring 1983 speech. Asked to appear before a Joint Committee of the United States Congress that year, he testified on his belief that spin-offs from space technology were benefiting the infirm and the elderly.

Heinlein's surgical treatment re-energized him, and he wrote five novels from 1980 until he died in his sleep from emphysema and heart failure on May 8, 1988.

In 1995, Spider Robinson wrote the novel Variable Star based on an outline and notes created by Heinlein. Heinlein's posthumously published nonfiction includes a selection of correspondence and notes edited into a somewhat autobiographical examination of his career, published in 1989 under the title Grumbles from the Grave by his wife, Virginia; his book on practical politics written in 1946 and published as Take Back Your Government in 1992; and a travelogue of their first around-the-world tour in 1954, Tramp Royale. The novel Podkayne of Mars, which had been edited against Heinlein's wishes in its original release, was reissued with the original ending. Stranger In a Strange Land was originally published in a shorter form, but both the long and short versions are now simultaneously available in print.

Heinlein's archive is housed by the Special Collections department of McHenry Library at the University of California, Santa Cruz. The collection includes manuscript drafts, correspondence, photographs and artifacts. A substantial portion of the archive has been digitized and it is available online through the Robert A. and Virginia Heinlein Archives.

== Written works ==
Heinlein published 32 novels, 59 short stories, and 16 collections during his lifetime. Nine films, two television series, several episodes of a radio series, and a board game have been derived more or less directly from his work. He wrote a screenplay for one of the films. Heinlein edited an anthology of other writers' SF short stories.

Three nonfiction books and two poems have been published posthumously. For Us, the Living: A Comedy of Customs was published posthumously in 2003; Variable Star, written by Spider Robinson based on an extensive outline by Heinlein, was published in September 2006. Four collections have been published posthumously.

=== Early work, 1939–1958 ===
Heinlein began his career as a writer of stories for Astounding Science Fiction magazine, which was edited by John Campbell. The science fiction writer Frederik Pohl has described Heinlein as "that greatest of Campbell-era sf writers". Isaac Asimov said that, from the time of his first story, the science fiction world accepted that Heinlein was the best science fiction writer in existence, adding that he would hold this title through his lifetime.

Alexei and Cory Panshin noted that Heinlein's impact was immediately felt. In 1940, the year after selling 'Life-Line' to Campbell, he wrote three short novels, four novelettes, and seven short stories. They went on to say that "No one ever dominated the science fiction field as Bob did in the first few years of his career." Alexei expresses awe in Heinlein's ability to show readers a world so drastically different from the one we live in now, yet have so many similarities. He says that "We find ourselves not only in a world other than our own, but identifying with a living, breathing individual who is operating within its context, and thinking and acting according to its terms."

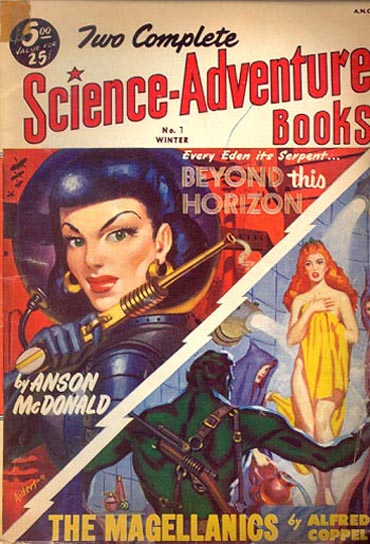
Heinlein's 1942 novel Beyond This Horizon was reprinted in Two Complete Science-Adventure Books in 1952, appearing under the "Anson McDonald" byline even though the book edition had been published under Heinlein's own name four years earlier.

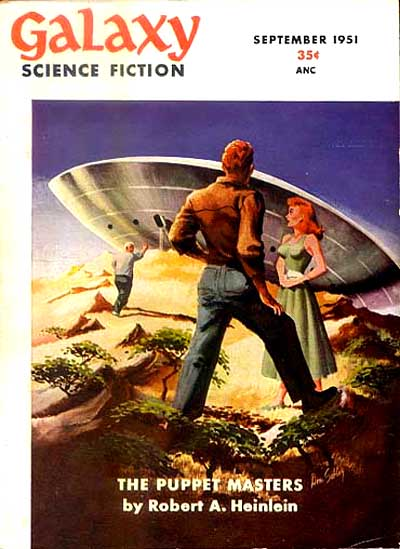
The opening installment of The Puppet Masters took the cover of the September 1951 issue of Galaxy Science Fiction.

The first novel that Heinlein wrote, For Us, the Living: A Comedy of Customs (1939), did not see print during his lifetime, but Robert James tracked down the manuscript and it was published in 2003. Though some regard it as a failure as a novel, considering it little more than a disguised lecture on Heinlein's social theories, some readers took a very different view. In a review of it, John Clute wrote:

I'm not about to suggest that if Heinlein had been able to publish [such works] openly in the pages of Astounding in 1939, SF would have gotten the future right; I would suggest, however, that if Heinlein, and his colleagues, had been able to publish adult SF in Astounding and its fellow journals, then SF might not have done such a grotesquely poor job of prefiguring something of the flavor of actually living here at the onset of 2004.

For Us, the Living was intriguing as a window into the development of Heinlein's radical ideas about man as a social animal, including his interest in free love. The root of many themes found in his later stories can be found in this book. It also contained a large amount of material that could be considered background for his other novels. This included a detailed description of the protagonist's treatment to avoid being banished to Coventry (a lawless land in the Heinlein mythos where unrepentant law-breakers are exiled).

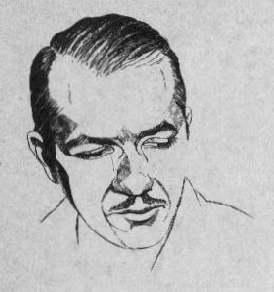
Heinlein as depicted in Amazing Stories in 1953

It appears that Heinlein at least attempted to live in a manner consistent with these ideals, even in the 1930s, and had an open relationship in his marriage to his second wife, Leslyn. He was also a nudist; nudism and body taboos are frequently discussed in his work. At the height of the Cold War, he built a bomb shelter under his house, like the one featured in Farnham's Freehold.

After For Us, the Living, Heinlein began selling (to magazines) first short stories, then novels, set in a Future History, complete with a time line of significant political, cultural, and technological changes. A chart of the future history was published in the May 1941 issue of Astounding. Over time, Heinlein wrote many novels and short stories that deviated freely from the Future History on some points, while maintaining consistency in some other areas. The Future History was eventually overtaken by actual events. These discrepancies were explained, after a fashion, in his later World as Myth stories.

Heinlein's first novel published as a book, Rocket Ship Galileo, was initially rejected because going to the Moon was considered too far-fetched, but he soon found a publisher, Scribner's, that began publishing a Heinlein juvenile once a year for the Christmas season. Eight of these books were illustrated by Clifford Geary in a distinctive white-on-black scratchboard style. Some representative novels of this type are Have Space Suit—Will Travel, Farmer in the Sky, and Starman Jones. Many of these were first published in serial form under other titles, e.g., Farmer in the Sky was published as Satellite Scout in the Boy Scout magazine Boys' Life. There has been speculation that Heinlein's intense obsession with his privacy was due at least in part to the apparent contradiction between his unconventional private life and his career as an author of books for children. However, For Us, the Living explicitly discusses the political importance Heinlein attached to privacy as a matter of principle. (Note: The importance Heinlein attached to privacy was made clear in his fiction, e.g., For Us, the Living, but also in several well-known examples from his life. He had a falling out with Alexei Panshin, who wrote an important book analyzing Heinlein's fiction; Heinlein stopped cooperating with Panshin because he accused Panshin of "[attempting to] pry into his affairs and to violate his privacy". Heinlein wrote to Panshin's publisher threatening to sue, and stating, "You are warned that only the barest facts of my private life are public knowledge ...". Heinlein was a nudist, and built a fence around his house in Santa Cruz to keep out the counterculture types who had learned of his ideas through Stranger in a Strange Land. In his later life, Heinlein studiously avoided revealing his early involvement in left-wing politics, and made strenuous efforts to block publication of information he had revealed to prospective biographer Sam Moskowitz.)

The novels that Heinlein wrote for a young audience are commonly called "the Heinlein juveniles", and they feature a mixture of adolescent and adult themes. Many of the issues that he takes on in these books have to do with the kinds of problems that adolescents experience. His protagonists are usually intelligent teenagers who have to make their way in the adult society they see around them. On the surface, they are simple tales of adventure, achievement, and dealing with stupid teachers and jealous peers. Heinlein was a vocal proponent of the notion that juvenile readers were far more sophisticated and able to handle more complex or difficult themes than most people realized. His juvenile stories often had a maturity to them that made them readable for adults. Red Planet, for example, portrays some subversive themes, including a revolution in which young students are involved; his editor demanded substantial changes in this book's discussion of topics such as the use of weapons by children and the misidentified sex of the Martian character. Heinlein was always aware of the editorial limitations put in place by the editors of his novels and stories, and while he observed those restrictions on the surface, was often successful in introducing ideas not often seen in other authors' juvenile SF.

In 1957, James Blish wrote that one reason for Heinlein's success "has been the high grade of machinery which goes, today as always, into his story-telling. Heinlein seems to have known from the beginning, as if instinctively, technical lessons about fiction which other writers must learn the hard way (or often enough, never learn). He does not always operate the machinery to the best advantage, but he always seems to be aware of it."

=== 1959–1960 ===
Heinlein decisively ended his juvenile novels with Starship Troopers (1959), a controversial work and his personal riposte to leftists calling for President Dwight D. Eisenhower to stop nuclear testing in 1958. "The 'Patrick Henry' ad shocked 'em", he wrote many years later of the campaign. "Starship Troopers outraged 'em." Starship Troopers is a coming-of-age story about duty, citizenship, and the role of the military in society. The book portrays a society in which suffrage is earned by demonstrated willingness to place society's interests before one's own, at least for a short time and often under onerous circumstances, in government service; in the case of the protagonist, this was military service.

Later, in Expanded Universe, Heinlein said that it was his intention in the novel that service could include positions outside strictly military functions such as teachers, police officers, and other government positions. This is presented in the novel as an outgrowth of the failure of unearned suffrage government and as a very successful arrangement. In addition, the franchise was only awarded after leaving the assigned service; thus those serving their terms—in the military, or any other service—were excluded from exercising any franchise. Career military were completely disenfranchised until retirement.

=== Middle period work, 1961–1973 ===
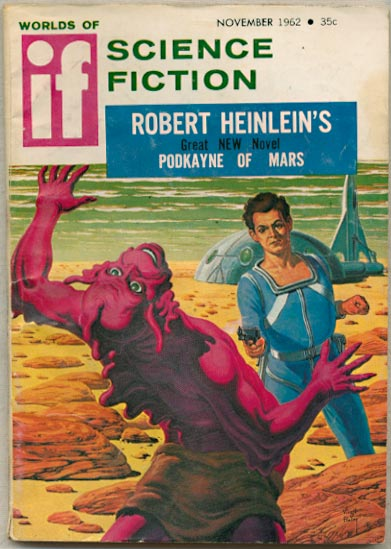
Heinlein's novel Podkayne of Mars was serialized in If, with a cover by Virgil Finlay.

From about 1961 (Stranger in a Strange Land) to 1973 (Time Enough for Love), Heinlein explored some of his most important themes, such as individualism, libertarianism, and free expression of physical and emotional love. Three novels from this period, Stranger in a Strange Land, The Moon Is a Harsh Mistress, and Time Enough for Love, won the Libertarian Futurist Society's Prometheus Hall of Fame Award, designed to honor classic libertarian fiction. Jeff Riggenbach described The Moon Is a Harsh Mistress as "unquestionably one of the three or four most influential libertarian novels of the last century".

Heinlein did not publish Stranger in a Strange Land until some time after it was written, and the themes of free love and radical individualism are prominently featured in his long-unpublished first novel, For Us, the Living: A Comedy of Customs.

The Moon Is a Harsh Mistress tells of a war of independence waged by the Lunar penal colonies, with significant comments from a major character, Professor La Paz, regarding the threat posed by government to individual freedom.

Although Heinlein had previously written a few short stories in the fantasy genre, during this period he wrote his first fantasy novel, Glory Road. In Stranger in a Strange Land and I Will Fear No Evil, he began to mix hard science with fantasy, mysticism, and satire of organized religion. Critics William H. Patterson Jr., and Andrew Thornton believe that this is simply an expression of Heinlein's longstanding philosophical opposition to positivism. Heinlein stated that he was influenced by James Branch Cabell in taking this new literary direction. The penultimate novel of this period, I Will Fear No Evil, is according to critic James Gifford "almost universally regarded as a literary failure" and he attributes its shortcomings to Heinlein's near-death from peritonitis.

=== Later work, 1980–1987 ===
After a seven-year hiatus brought on by poor health, Heinlein produced five new novels in the period from 1980 (The Number of the Beast) to 1987 (To Sail Beyond the Sunset). These books have a thread of common characters and time and place. They most explicitly communicated Heinlein's philosophies and beliefs, and many long, didactic passages of dialog and exposition deal with government, sex, and religion. These novels are controversial among his readers and one critic, David Langford, has written about them very negatively. Heinlein's four Hugo awards were all for books written before this period.

Most of the novels from this period are recognized by critics as forming an offshoot from the Future History series and are referred to by the term World as Myth.

The tendency toward authorial self-reference begun in Stranger in a Strange Land and Time Enough for Love becomes even more evident in novels such as The Cat Who Walks Through Walls, whose first-person protagonist is a disabled military veteran who becomes a writer, and finds love with a female character.

The 1982 novel Friday, a more conventional adventure story (borrowing a character and backstory from the earlier short story Gulf, also containing suggestions of connection to The Puppet Masters) continued a Heinlein theme of expecting what he saw as the continued disintegration of Earth's society, to the point where the title character is strongly encouraged to seek a new life off-planet. It concludes with a traditional Heinlein note, as in The Moon Is a Harsh Mistress or Time Enough for Love, that freedom is to be found on the frontiers.

The 1984 novel Job: A Comedy of Justice is a sharp satire of organized religion. Heinlein himself was agnostic.

=== Posthumous publications ===
Several Heinlein works have been published since his death, including the aforementioned For Us, the Living as well as 1989's Grumbles from the Grave, a collection of letters between Heinlein and his editors and agent; 1992's Tramp Royale, a travelogue of a southern hemisphere tour the Heinleins took in the 1950s; Take Back Your Government, a how-to book about participatory democracy written in 1946 and reflecting his experience as an organizer with the EPIC campaign of 1934 and the movement's aftermath as an important factor in California politics before the Second World War; and a tribute volume called Requiem: Collected Works and Tributes to the Grand Master, containing some additional short works previously unpublished in book form. Off the Main Sequence, published in 2005, includes three short stories never before collected in any Heinlein book (Heinlein called them "stinkeroos").

Spider Robinson, a colleague, friend, and admirer of Heinlein, wrote Variable Star, based on an outline and notes for a novel that Heinlein prepared in 1955. The novel was published as a collaboration, with Heinlein's name above Robinson's on the cover, in 2006.

A complete collection of Heinlein's published work has been published by the Heinlein Prize Trust as the "Virginia Edition", after his wife. See the Complete Works section of Robert A. Heinlein bibliography for details.

On February 1, 2019, Phoenix Pick announced that through a collaboration with the Heinlein Prize Trust, a reconstruction of the full text of an unpublished Heinlein novel had been produced. It was published in March 2020. The reconstructed novel, entitled The Pursuit of the Pankera: A Parallel Novel about Parallel Universes, is an alternative version of The Number of the Beast; the first third of the two books are mostly the same, but the rest differs entirely with different storylines. The newly reconstructed novel pays homage to Edgar Rice Burroughs and E. E. "Doc" Smith. It was edited by Patrick Lobrutto. Some reviewers describe the newly reconstructed novel as more in line with the style of a traditional Heinlein novel than was The Number of the Beast. The Pursuit of the Pankera was considered superior to the original version of The Number of the Beast by some reviewers. Both The Pursuit of the Pankera and a new edition of The Number of the Beast were published in March 2020. The new edition of the latter shares the subtitle of The Pursuit of the Pankera, hence entitled The Number of the Beast: A Parallel Novel about Parallel Universes.

== Adaptations to other media ==
Heinlein contributed to the final draft of the script for the film Destination Moon (1950) and also served as a technical adviser. Heinlein also shared screenwriting credit for Project Moonbase (1953).

Since Heinlein's death, several of his works have been adapted as films. These include The Puppet Masters (1994), Starship Troopers (1998), Predestination (2014) (adapted from "All You Zombies--") and The Door Into Summer (2021, Japanese).

The 1950s radio series Dimension X and its successor series X Minus One both adapted Heinlein's stories on multiple occasions. See List of Dimension X episodes and List of X Minus One episodes.

== Influences ==
The primary influence on Heinlein's writing style may have been Rudyard Kipling. Kipling is the first known modern example of "indirect exposition", a writing technique for which Heinlein later became famous. In his famous text on "On the Writing of Speculative Fiction", Heinlein quotes Kipling:

There are nine-and-sixty ways
Of constructing tribal lays
And every single one of them is right

Stranger in a Strange Land originated as a modernized version of Kipling's The Jungle Book. His wife suggested that the child be raised by Martians instead of wolves. Likewise, Citizen of the Galaxy can be seen as a reboot of Kipling's novel Kim.

The Starship Troopers idea of needing to serve in the military in order to vote can be found in Kipling's "The Army of a Dream":

But as a little detail we never mention, if we don't volunteer in some corps or other—as combatants if we're fit, as non-combatants if we ain't—till we're thirty-five—we don't vote, and we don't get poor-relief, and the women don't love us.

Poul Anderson once said of Kipling's science fiction story "As Easy as A.B.C.", "a wonderful science fiction yarn, showing the same eye for detail that would later distinguish the work of Robert Heinlein".

Heinlein described himself as also being influenced by George Bernard Shaw, having read most of his plays. Shaw is an example of an earlier author who used the competent man, a favorite Heinlein archetype. He denied, though, any direct influence of Back to Methuselah on Methuselah's Children.

== Views ==
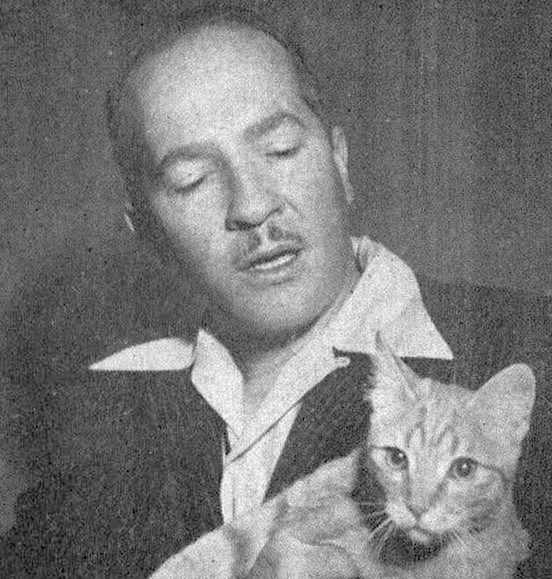
Heinlein c. 1953

Heinlein's books probe a range of ideas about a range of topics such as sexuality, race, politics, and the military. Many were seen as radical or as ahead of their time in their social criticism. His books have inspired considerable debate about the specifics, and the evolution, of Heinlein's own opinions, and have earned him both lavish praise and a degree of criticism. He has also been accused of contradicting himself on various philosophical questions.

Brian Doherty cites William Patterson, saying that the best way to gain an understanding of Heinlein is as a "full-service iconoclast, the unique individual who decides that things do not have to be, and won't continue, as they are". He says this vision is "at the heart of Heinlein, science fiction, libertarianism, and America. Heinlein imagined how everything about the human world, from our sexual mores to our religion to our automobiles to our government to our plans for cultural survival, might be flawed, even fatally so."

The critic Elizabeth Anne Hull, for her part, has praised Heinlein for his interest in exploring fundamental life questions, especially questions about "political power—our responsibilities to one another" and about "personal freedom, particularly sexual freedom".

Edward R. Murrow hosted a series on CBS Radio called This I Believe, which solicited an entry from Heinlein in 1952, titled "Our Noble, Essential Decency". In it, Heinlein broke with the normal trends, stating that he believed in his neighbors (some of whom he named and described), community, and towns across America that share the same sense of good will and intentions as his own, going on to apply this same philosophy to the US, and humanity in general.

I believe in my fellow citizens. Our headlines are splashed with crime. Yet for every criminal, there are ten thousand honest, decent, kindly men. If it were not so, no child would live to grow up. Business could not go on from day to day. Decency is not news. It is buried in the obituaries, but it is a force stronger than crime.

=== Politics ===
Heinlein's political positions shifted throughout his life. Heinlein's early political leanings were liberal. In 1934, he worked actively for the Democratic campaign of Upton Sinclair for Governor of California. After Sinclair lost, Heinlein became an anti-communist Democratic activist. He made an unsuccessful bid for a California State Assembly seat in 1938. Heinlein's first novel, For Us, the Living (written 1939), consists largely of speeches advocating the Social Credit philosophy, and the early story "Misfit" (1939) deals with an organization—"The Cosmic Construction Corps"—that seems to be Franklin D. Roosevelt's Civilian Conservation Corps translated into outer space.

Of this time in his life, Heinlein later said:

At the time I wrote Methuselah's Children I was still politically quite naïve and still had hopes that various libertarian notions could be put over by political processes... It [now] seems to me that every time we manage to establish one freedom, they take another one away. Maybe two. And that seems to me characteristic of a society as it gets older, and more crowded, and higher taxes, and more laws.

Heinlein's fiction of the 1940s and 1950s, however, began to espouse conservative views. After 1945, he came to believe that a strong world government was the only way to avoid mutual nuclear annihilation. His 1949 novel Space Cadet describes a future scenario where a military-controlled global government enforces world peace. Heinlein ceased considering himself a Democrat in 1954.

The Heinleins formed the Patrick Henry League in 1958, and they worked in the 1964 Barry Goldwater presidential campaign.

When Robert A. Heinlein opened his Colorado Springs newspaper on April 5, 1958, he read a full-page ad demanding that the Eisenhower Administration stop testing nuclear weapons. The science fiction author was flabbergasted. He called for the formation of the Patrick Henry League and spent the next several weeks writing and publishing his own polemic that lambasted "Communist-line goals concealed in idealistic-sounding nonsense" and urged Americans not to become "soft-headed".

Heinlein's response ad was entitled "Who Are the Heirs of Patrick Henry?". It started with the famous Henry quotation: "Is life so dear, or peace so sweet, as to be purchased at the price of chains and slavery? Forbid it, Almighty God! I know not what course others may take, but as for me, give me liberty, or give me death!!" It then went on to admit that there was some risk to nuclear testing (albeit less than the "willfully distorted" claims of the test ban advocates), and risk of nuclear war, but that "The alternative is surrender. We accept the risks." Heinlein was among those who in 1968 signed a pro–Vietnam War ad in Galaxy Science Fiction.

Heinlein always considered himself a libertarian; in a letter to Judith Merril in 1967 (never sent) he said, "As for libertarian, I've been one all my life, a radical one. You might use the term 'philosophical anarchist' or 'autarchist' about me, but 'libertarian' is easier to define and fits well enough."

Stranger in a Strange Land was embraced by the 1960s counterculture, and libertarians have found inspiration in The Moon Is a Harsh Mistress. Both groups found resonance with his themes of personal freedom in both thought and action.

=== Race ===
Heinlein grew up in the era of racial segregation in the United States and wrote some of his most influential fiction at the height of the Civil Rights Movement. He explicitly made the case for using his fiction not only to predict the future but also to educate his readers about the value of racial equality and the importance of racial tolerance. His early novels were ahead of their time both in their explicit rejection of racism and in their inclusion of protagonists of color. In the context of science fiction before the 1960s, the mere existence of characters of color was a remarkable novelty, with green occurring more often than brown. For example, his 1948 novel Space Cadet explicitly uses aliens as a metaphor for minorities. The 1947 story "Jerry Was a Man" uses enslaved genetically modified chimpanzees as a symbol for Black Americans fighting for civil rights. In his novel The Star Beast, the de facto foreign minister of the Terran government is an undersecretary, a Mr. Kiku, who is from Africa. Heinlein explicitly states his skin is "ebony black" and that Kiku is in an arranged marriage that is happy.

In a number of his stories, Heinlein challenges his readers' possible racial preconceptions by introducing a strong, sympathetic character, only to reveal much later that he or she is of African or other ancestry. In several cases, the covers of the books show characters as being light-skinned when the text states or at least implies that they are dark-skinned or of African ancestry. Heinlein repeatedly denounced racism in his nonfiction works, including numerous examples in Expanded Universe.

Heinlein reveals in Starship Troopers that the novel's protagonist and narrator, Johnny Rico, the formerly disaffected scion of a wealthy family, is Filipino, actually named "Juan Rico" and speaks Tagalog in addition to English.

However, not all of Heinlein's work is successfully anti racist. In the 1941 novel Sixth Column (also known as The Day After Tomorrow), a white resistance movement in the United States defends itself against an invasion by an Asian fascist state (the "Pan-Asians") using a "super-science" technology that allows ray weapons to be tuned to specific races. The idea for the story was pushed on Heinlein by editor John W. Campbell and the story itself was based on a then-unpublished story by Campbell, and Heinlein wrote later that he had "had to re-slant it to remove racist aspects of the original story line" and that he did not "consider it to be an artistic success". However, the novel prompted a heated debate in the scientific community regarding the plausibility of developing ethnic bioweapons. John Hickman, writing in the European Journal of American Studies, identifies examples of anti–East Asian racism in some of Heinlein's works, particularly Sixth Column. The most prominent and problematic example is Farnham's Freehold, which casts a white family into a future in which white people are the slaves of cannibalistic black rulers. Clearly intended as anti-racist (the African American character is easily the most sympathetic) the use of literal cannibalism to make the point about the metaphorical cannibalism of a racist society is considered by most critics to misfire badly.

Heinlein summed up his attitude toward people of any race in his essay "Our Noble, Essential Decency" thus:

And finally, I believe in my whole race—yellow, white, black, red, brown—in the honesty, courage, intelligence, durability, and goodness of the overwhelming majority of my brothers and sisters everywhere on this planet. I am proud to be a human being.

=== Individualism and self-determination ===
In keeping with his belief in individualism, his work for adults—and sometimes even his work for juveniles—often portrays both the oppressors and the oppressed with considerable ambiguity. Heinlein believed that individualism was incompatible with ignorance. He believed that an appropriate level of adult competence was achieved through a wide-ranging education, whether this occurred in a classroom or not. In his juvenile novels, more than once a character looks with disdain at a student's choice of classwork, saying, "Why didn't you study something useful?" In Time Enough for Love, Lazarus Long gives a long list of capabilities that anyone should have, concluding, "Specialization is for insects." The ability of the individual to create himself is explored in stories such as I Will Fear No Evil, "'—All You Zombies—'", and "By His Bootstraps".

Heinlein claimed to have written Starship Troopers in response to "calls for the unilateral ending of nuclear testing by the United States". Heinlein suggests in the book that the Bugs are a good example of Communism being something that humans cannot successfully adhere to, since humans are strongly defined individuals, whereas the Bugs, being a collective, can all contribute to the whole without consideration of individual desire.

=== The Competent Man ===
A common theme in Heinlein's writing is his frequent use of the "competent man", a stock character who exhibits a very wide range of abilities and knowledge, making him a form of polymath. This trope was notably common in 1950s U.S. science fiction. While Heinlein was not the first to use such a character type, the heroes and heroines of his fiction (with Jubal Harshaw being a prime example) generally have a wide range of abilities, and one of Heinlein's characters, Lazarus Long, gives a wide summary of requirements:

A human being should be able to change a diaper, plan an invasion, butcher a hog, conn a ship, design a building, write a sonnet, balance accounts, build a wall, set a bone, comfort the dying, take orders, give orders, cooperate, act alone, solve equations, analyze a new problem, pitch manure, program a computer, cook a tasty meal, fight efficiently, die gallantly. Specialization is for insects.

— Robert Heinlein, Time Enough for Love

Predecessors of Heinlein's competent heroes include the protagonists of George Bernard Shaw, like Henry Higgins in Pygmalion and Caesar in Caesar and Cleopatra, as well as the citizen soldiers in Rudyard Kipling's "The Army of a Dream".

=== Sexuality and sexual politics ===
For Heinlein, personal liberation included sexual liberation, and free love was a major subject of his writing starting in 1939, with For Us, the Living. During Heinlein's early period, his writing for younger readers needed to take into account the perceptions of sexuality by editors and the buying public; as critic William H. Patterson has put it, his dilemma was "to sort out what was really objectionable from what was only excessive over-sensitivity to imaginary librarians".

By his middle period, sexual freedom and the elimination of sexual jealousy became a major theme; for instance, in Stranger in a Strange Land (1961), the progressively minded but sexually conservative reporter, Ben Caxton, acts as a dramatic foil for the less parochial characters, Jubal Harshaw and Valentine Michael Smith (Mike). Another of the main characters, Jill, is homophobic, and says that "nine times out of ten, if a girl gets raped it's partly her own fault."

According to Gary Westfahl,

Heinlein is a problematic case for feminists; on the one hand, his works often feature strong female characters and vigorous statements that women are equal to or even superior to men; but these characters and statements often reflect hopelessly stereotypical attitudes about typical female attributes. It is disconcerting, for example, that in Expanded Universe Heinlein calls for a society where all lawyers and politicians are women, essentially on the grounds that they possess a mysterious feminine practicality that men cannot duplicate.

Farah Mendlesohn has claimed that most of the assertions that Heinlein is problematic for feminists have come from men. Mendlesohn and Jo Walton argue that Heinlein's stereotypes about women are often written to be undermined, as in 'Delilah and the Spacerigger' (1949), and abuse is depicted in order to be challenged, as in Podkayne of Mars (1963), Friday (1982) and To Sail Beyond the Sunset (1987).

However, not all feminists agree that Heinlein should be celebrated uncritically. Writer M.G. Lord recounts her own ambivalence toward Heinlein, particularly with regard to his later novels. Science fiction author Pat Murphy has described herself as "outraged" by Heinlein. According to Murphy, Podkayne's protagonist must "alter her aspirations and accept a traditional woman's role." Nancy Kress asserts that Friday is dependent on "old stereotypes" about women and rape that she finds repulsive.

In books written as early as 1956, Heinlein dealt with incest and the sexual nature of children. Many of his books including Time for the Stars, Glory Road, Time Enough for Love, and The Number of the Beast dealt explicitly or implicitly with incest, sexual feelings and relations between adults, children, or both. The treatment of these themes include the romantic relationship and eventual marriage of two characters in The Door into Summer who met when one was a 30-year-old engineer and the other was an 11-year-old girl, and who eventually married when time-travel rendered the girl an adult while the engineer aged minimally, or the more overt intra-familial incest in To Sail Beyond the Sunset and Time Enough for Love. Heinlein often posed situations where the nominal purpose of sexual taboos was irrelevant to a particular situation, due to future advances in technology. For example, in Time Enough for Love Heinlein describes a brother and sister (Joe and Llita) who were mirror twins, being complementary diploids with entirely disjoint genomes, and thus not at increased risk for unfavorable gene duplication due to consanguinity. In this instance, Llita and Joe were props used to explore the concept of incest, where the usual objection to incest—heightened risk of genetic defect in their children—was not a consideration. Peers such as L. Sprague de Camp and Damon Knight have commented critically on Heinlein's portrayal of incest and pedophilia in a lighthearted and even approving manner. Diane Parkin-Speer suggests that Heinlein's intent seems more to provoke the reader and to question sexual norms than to promote any particular sexual agenda.

=== Philosophy ===
In To Sail Beyond the Sunset, Heinlein has the main character, Maureen, state that the purpose of metaphysics is to ask questions: "Why are we here?" "Where are we going after we die?" (and so on); and that you are not allowed to answer the questions. Asking the questions is the point of metaphysics, but answering them is not, because once you answer this kind of question, you cross the line into religion. Maureen does not state a reason for this; she simply remarks that such questions are "beautiful" but lack answers. Maureen's son/lover Lazarus Long makes a related remark in Time Enough for Love. In order for us to answer the "big questions" about the universe, Lazarus states at one point, it would be necessary to stand outside the universe.

During the 1930s and 1940s, Heinlein was deeply interested in Alfred Korzybski's general semantics and attended a number of seminars on the subject. His views on epistemology seem to have flowed from that interest, and his fictional characters continue to express Korzybskian views to the very end of his writing career. Many of his stories, such as Gulf, If This Goes On—, and Stranger in a Strange Land, depend strongly on the premise, related to the well-known Sapir–Whorf hypothesis, that by using a correctly designed language, one can change or improve oneself mentally, or even realize untapped potential (as in the case of Joe in Gulf—whose last name may be Greene, Gilead or Briggs).

When Ayn Rand's novel The Fountainhead was published, Heinlein was very favorably impressed, as quoted in "Grumbles ..." and mentioned John Galt—the hero in Rand's Atlas Shrugged—as a heroic archetype in The Moon Is a Harsh Mistress. He was also strongly affected by the religious philosopher P. D. Ouspensky. Freudianism and psychoanalysis were at the height of their influence during the peak of Heinlein's career, and stories such as Time for the Stars indulged in psychological theorizing.

However, he was skeptical about Freudianism, especially after a struggle with an editor who insisted on reading Freudian sexual symbolism into his juvenile novels. Heinlein was fascinated by the social credit movement in the 1930s. This is shown in Beyond This Horizon and in his 1938 novel For Us, the Living: A Comedy of Customs, which was finally published in 2003, long after his death.

==== Pay it forward ====
On that theme, the phrase "pay it forward", though it was already in occasional use as a quotation, was popularized by Robert A. Heinlein in his book Between Planets, published in 1951:

The banker reached into the folds of his gown, pulled out a single credit note. "But eat first—a full belly steadies the judgment. Do me the honor of accepting this as our welcome to the newcomer."

His pride said no; his stomach said YES! Don took it and said, "Uh, thanks! That's awfully kind of you. I'll pay it back, first chance." "Instead, pay it forward to some other brother who needs it."

— Between Planets

He referred to this in a number of other stories, although sometimes just saying to pay a debt back by helping others, as in one of his last works, Job, a Comedy of Justice.

Heinlein was a mentor to Ray Bradbury, giving him help and quite possibly passing on the concept, made famous by the publication of a letter from him to Heinlein thanking him. In Bradbury's novel Dandelion Wine, published in 1957, when the main character Douglas Spaulding is reflecting on his life being saved by Mr. Jonas, the Junkman:

How do I thank Mr. Jonas, he wondered, for what he's done? How do I thank him, how pay him back? No way, no way at all. You just can't pay. What then? What? Pass it on somehow, he thought, pass it on to someone else. Keep the chain moving. Look around, find someone, and pass it on. That was the only way...

Bradbury has also advised that writers he has helped thank him by helping other writers.

Heinlein both preached and practiced this philosophy; now the Heinlein Society, a humanitarian organization founded in his name, does so, attributing the philosophy to its various efforts, including Heinlein for Heroes, the Heinlein Society Scholarship Program, and Heinlein Society blood drives. Author Spider Robinson made repeated reference to the doctrine, attributing it to his spiritual mentor Heinlein.

== Influence and legacy ==
=== Honorifics ===
Heinlein is usually identified, along with Isaac Asimov and Arthur C. Clarke, as one of the three masters of science fiction to arise in the so-called Golden Age of science fiction, associated with John W. Campbell and his magazine Astounding. In the 1950s he was a leader in bringing science fiction out of the low-paying and less prestigious "pulp ghetto". Most of his works, including short stories, have been continuously in print in many languages since their initial appearance and are still available as new paperbacks decades after his death.

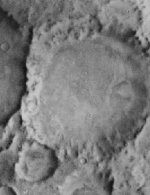
Heinlein crater on Mars

He was at the top of his form during, and himself helped to initiate, the trend toward social science fiction, which went along with a general maturing of the genre away from space opera to a more literary approach touching on such adult issues as politics and human sexuality. In reaction to this trend, hard science fiction began to be distinguished as a separate subgenre, but paradoxically Heinlein is also considered a seminal figure in hard science fiction, due to his extensive knowledge of engineering and the careful scientific research demonstrated in his stories. Heinlein himself stated—with obvious pride—that in the days before pocket calculators, he and his wife Virginia once worked for several days on a mathematical equation describing an Earth–Mars rocket orbit, which was then subsumed in a single sentence of the novel Space Cadet.

=== Writing style ===
Heinlein used a technique called "indirect exposition", perhaps first introduced by Rudyard Kipling in his own science fiction venture, the Aerial Board of Control stories. Kipling had picked this up during his time in India, using it to avoid bogging down his stories set in India with explanations for his English readers. (Note: Kipling had learned this trick in India. His original Anglo-Indian readership knew the customs, institutions, and landscapes of British India at first hand. But when he began writing for a wider British and American audience, he had to provide his new readers with enough information for them to understand what was going on. In his earliest stories and verse he made liberal use of footnotes, but he evolved more subtle methods as his talent matured. A combination of outright exposition, sparingly used, and contextual clues, generously sprinkled through the narrative, offered the needed background. In Kim and other stories of India he uses King James English to indicate that characters are speaking in Hindustani; this is never explained, but it gets the message across subliminally., quoted in esr (December 2, 2005). "Rudyard Kipling Invented SF!". Armed and Dangerous. Archived from the original on April 1, 2017.) This technique—mentioning details in a way that lets the reader infer more about the universe than is actually spelled out—became a trademark rhetorical technique of Heinlein and writers influenced by him. Heinlein was significantly influenced by Kipling beyond this, for example quoting him in "On the Writing of Speculative Fiction".

Likewise, Heinlein's name is often associated with the competent hero, a character archetype who, though he or she may have flaws and limitations, is a strong, accomplished person able to overcome any soluble problem set in their path. They tend to feel confident overall, have a broad life experience and set of skills, and not give up when the going gets tough. This style influenced not only the writing style of a generation of authors, but even their personal character. Harlan Ellison said, "Very early in life when I read Robert Heinlein, I got the thread that runs through his stories—the notion of the competent man ... I've always held that as my ideal. I've tried to be a very competent man."

==== Rules of writing ====
When fellow writers, or fans, wrote Heinlein asking for writing advice, he famously gave out his own list of rules for becoming a successful writer:

1. You must write.
2. You must FINISH what you write.
3. You must refrain from rewriting, except to editorial order.
4. You must put your story on the market.
5. You must keep it on the market until it has sold.

About which he said:

The above five rules really have more to do with how to write speculative fiction than anything said above them. But they are amazingly hard to follow—which is why there are so few professional writers and so many aspirants, and which is why I am not afraid to give away the racket!

Heinlein later published an entire article, "On the Writing of Speculative Fiction", which included his rules, and from which the above quote is taken. When he says "anything said above them", he refers to his other guidelines. For example, he describes most stories as fitting into one of a handful of basic categories:

- The gadget story
- The human interest story
- Boy meets girl
- The Little Tailor
- The man-who-learned-better

In the article, Heinlein proposes that most stories fit into either the gadget story or the human interest story, which is itself subdivided into the three latter categories. He also credits L. Ron Hubbard as having identified "The Man-Who-Learned-Better".

=== Influence among writers ===
Heinlein has had a pervasive influence on other science fiction writers. In a 1953 poll of leading science fiction authors, he was cited more frequently as an influence than any other modern writer. Critic James Gifford writes that

Although many other writers have exceeded Heinlein's output, few can claim to match his broad and seminal influence. Scores of science fiction writers from the prewar Golden Age through the present day loudly and enthusiastically credit Heinlein for blazing the trails of their own careers, and shaping their styles and stories.

— Robert A. Heinlein, A Reader's Companion, p. xiii

Heinlein gave Larry Niven and Jerry Pournelle extensive advice on a draft manuscript of The Mote in God's Eye. He contributed a cover blurb calling it "possibly the finest science fiction novel I have ever read." In their novel Footfall, Niven and Pournelle included Robert A. Heinlein as a character under the name "Bob Anson." Anson in the novel is a respected and well-known science-fiction author. Writer David Gerrold, responsible for creating the tribbles in Star Trek, also credited Heinlein as the inspiration for his Dingilliad series of novels. Gregory Benford refers to his novel Jupiter Project as a Heinlein tribute. Similarly, Charles Stross says his Hugo Award-nominated novel Saturn's Children is "a space opera and late-period Robert A. Heinlein tribute", referring to Heinlein's Friday. The theme and plot of Kameron Hurley's novel The Light Brigade clearly echo those of Heinlein's Starship Troopers.

=== Words and phrases coined ===
Even outside the science fiction community, several words and phrases coined or adopted by Heinlein have passed into common English usage:

- Waldo, protagonist in the eponymous short story "Waldo", whose name came to mean mechanical or robot arms in the real world that are akin to the ones used by the character in the story.
- Grok, a Martian word for understanding a thing so fully as to become one with it, from Stranger in a Strange Land, whose root meaning in Martian is "to drink".
- Space marine, an existing term popularized by Heinlein in short stories, the concept then being made famous by Starship Troopers, though the term "space marine" is not used in that novel.
- Speculative fiction, a term Heinlein used for the separation of serious, consistent science fiction writing, from the pop "sci fi" of the day.

=== Inspiring culture and technology ===
In 1962, Oberon Zell-Ravenheart (then still using his birth name, Tim Zell) founded the Church of All Worlds, a Neopagan religious organization modeled in many ways (including its name) after the treatment of religion in the novel Stranger in a Strange Land. This spiritual path included several ideas from the book, including non-mainstream family structures, social libertarianism, water-sharing rituals, an acceptance of all religious paths by a single tradition, and the use of several terms such as "grok", "Thou art God", and "Never Thirst". Though Heinlein was neither a member nor a promoter of the Church, there was a frequent exchange of correspondence between Zell and Heinlein, and he was a paid subscriber to their magazine, Green Egg. This Church still exists as a 501(C)(3) religious organization incorporated in California, with membership worldwide, and it remains an active part of the neopagan community today. Zell-Ravenheart's wife, Morning Glory, coined the term polyamory in 1990, another movement that includes Heinlein concepts among its roots.

Heinlein was influential in making space exploration seem to the public more like a practical possibility. His stories in publications such as The Saturday Evening Post took a matter-of-fact approach to their outer-space setting, rather than the "gee whiz" tone that had previously been common. The 1950 documentary-like film Destination Moon advocated a Space Race with an unspecified foreign power almost a decade before such an idea became commonplace, and was promoted by an unprecedented publicity campaign in print publications. Many of the astronauts and others working in the U.S. space program grew up on a diet of the Heinlein juveniles, best evidenced by the naming of a crater on Mars after him, and a tribute interspersed by the Apollo 15 astronauts into their radio conversations while on the moon.

Heinlein was also a guest commentator (along with fellow science fiction author Arthur C. Clarke) for Walter Cronkite's coverage of the Apollo 11 Moon landing. He remarked to Cronkite during the landing, "This is the greatest event in human history, up to this time. This is—today is New Year's Day of the Year One."

Heinlein has inspired many transformational figures in business and technology including Lee Felsenstein, the designer of the first mass-produced portable computer, Marc Andreessen, co-author of the first widely used web browser, and Elon Musk, CEO of Tesla and founder of SpaceX.

=== Heinlein Society ===
The Heinlein Society was founded by Virginia Heinlein on behalf of her husband, to "pay forward" the legacy of the writer to future generations of "Heinlein's Children". The foundation has programs to:

- "Promote Heinlein blood drives."
- "Provide educational materials to educators."
- "Promote scholarly research and overall discussion of the works and ideas of Robert Anson Heinlein."

The Heinlein society also established the Robert A. Heinlein Award in 2003 "for outstanding published works in science fiction and technical writings to inspire the human exploration of space".

== Honors ==
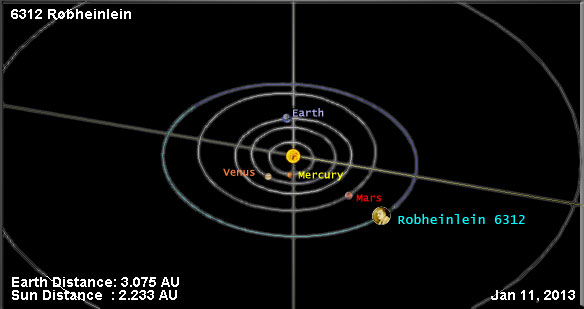
Orbital path of Robert Heinlein's eponymous asteroid

In his lifetime, Heinlein received four Hugo Awards, for Double Star, Starship Troopers, Stranger in a Strange Land, and The Moon Is a Harsh Mistress, and was nominated for four Nebula Awards, for The Moon Is a Harsh Mistress, Friday, Time Enough for Love, and Job: A Comedy of Justice. He was also given seven Retro-Hugos: two for best novel: Beyond This Horizon and Farmer in the Sky; three for best novella: If This Goes On..., Waldo, and The Man Who Sold the Moon; one for best novelette: "The Roads Must Roll"; and one for best dramatic presentation: "Destination Moon".

Heinlein was also nominated for six Hugo Awards for the works Have Space Suit: Will Travel, Glory Road, Time Enough for Love, Friday, Job: A Comedy of Justice and Grumbles from the Grave, as well as six Retro Hugo Awards for Magic, Inc., "Requiem", "Coventry", "Blowups Happen", "Goldfish Bowl", and "The Unpleasant Profession of Jonathan Hoag".

Heinlein won the Locus Award for "All-Time Favorite Author" in 1973, and for "All-Time Best Author" in 1988.

The Science Fiction Writers of America named Heinlein its first Grand Master in 1974, presented 1975. Officers and past presidents of the Association select a living writer for lifetime achievement (now annually and including fantasy literature).

In 1977, Heinlein was awarded the Inkpot Award, and in 1985, he was awarded the Eisner Awards "Bob Clampett Humanitarian Award".

Main-belt asteroid 6312 Robheinlein (1990 RH4), discovered on September 14, 1990, by H. E. Holt at Palomar, was named after him.

In 1994 the International Astronomical Union named Heinlein crater on Mars in his honor.

The Science Fiction and Fantasy Hall of Fame inducted Heinlein in 1998.

In 2001 the United States Naval Academy created the Robert A. Heinlein Chair in Aerospace Engineering.

Heinlein was the Ghost of Honor at the 2008 World Science Fiction Convention in Denver, Colorado, which held several panels on his works. Nearly seventy years earlier, he had been a Guest of Honor at the same convention.

In 2016, after an intensive online campaign to win a vote for the opening, Heinlein was inducted into the Hall of Famous Missourians. His bronze bust, created by Kansas City sculptor E. Spencer Schubert, is on permanent display in the Missouri State Capitol in Jefferson City.

The Libertarian Futurist Society has honored eight of Heinlein's novels and two short stories with their Hall of Fame award. The first two were given during his lifetime for The Moon Is a Harsh Mistress and Stranger in a Strange Land. Five more were awarded posthumously for Red Planet, Methuselah's Children, Time Enough for Love, and the short stories "Requiem" and "Coventry".

== See also ==
- Robert A. Heinlein bibliography
- Heinlein Society
  - Robert A. Heinlein Award
  - Heinlein Prize for Advances in Space Commercialization
- Heinlein Centennial Convention
- List of Robert A. Heinlein characters
- "The Return of William Proxmire"
