= On the Writing of Speculative Fiction =

1947 essay by Robert A. Heinlein

"On the Writing of Speculative Fiction" is an essay by American science fiction writer Robert A. Heinlein. It was first published in 1947, also appearing in Writing Science Fiction & Fantasy: 20 Dynamic Essays By the Field's Top Professionals in 1993, and The Nonfiction of Robert Heinlein: Volume I in 2011.

== Advice, turned essay ==
When fellow writers, or fans, wrote Heinlein asking for writing advice, he famously gave out his own list of rules for becoming a successful writer:

1. You must write
2. Finish what you start
3. You must refrain from rewriting, except to editorial order
4. You must put your story on the market
5. You must keep it on the market until it has sold

About which he said:

The above five rules really have more to do with how to write speculative fiction than anything said above them. But they are amazingly hard to follow – which is why there are so few professional writers and so many aspirants, and which is why I am not afraid to give away the racket!

Heinlein later published an entire article under the title "On the Writing of Speculative Fiction," which included his rules, and from which the above quote is taken. When he says "anything said above them", he refers to his other guidelines. For example, he describes most stories as fitting into one of a handful of basic categories:

- The Gadget Story
- The Human Interest Story
  - Boy Meets Girl
  - The Little Tailor
  - The Man-Who-Learned-Better

In the article, Heinlein credits L. Ron Hubbard as having identified "The Man-Who-Learned-Better".

== Article ==
- Heinlein, Robert A. (June 2022). "On The Writing of Speculative Fiction". Nota do Tradutor. Vol. 1, no. 24. Desterro. pp. 126–131. ISSN 2177-5141.
