= The Army of a Dream =

""The Army of a Dream""
- Short story by Rudyard Kipling
- The cover of a 1905 print of The Army of a Dream
- Country: United States
- Language: English

Publication
- Publisher: Morning Post
- Publication date: 1904

"The Army of a Dream" is a speculative fiction short story written by Rudyard Kipling, published in the Morning Post in June 1904. In it Kipling puts forward various methods for reforming the British Army of the period.

== Plot ==
The story begins with an army officer taking the unnamed narrator to visit his military unit, the Tynesiders. It is revealed that in this parallel Britain envisaged by Kipling, military service for males is voluntary, but almost universal, because only those who have served may vote, along with a number of other incentives. The result is a form of citizen militia composed of competent men focused on dealing with any threat to their community and nation. In addition to ensuring home defence this "Army of a Dream" contains special units intended for overseas colonial service and for possible intervention in Europe.

The complex and idealised military system of Kipling's imagination includes features such as rudimentary training for boys beginning at the age of eight, close integration between army and navy and an Empire-wide sense of assimilation between civilians and soldiers.

On the last page of the novel the narrator suddenly realises that the officers accompanying him on his inspection tour are actually dead friends or acquaintances who died in the mismanaged South African War.

== Criticism ==
"The Army of a Dream" was criticised as being political propaganda masquerading as a short story. Kipling himself acknowledged that it was not a serious attempt at army reform but simply an effort to put forward a number of ideas for consideration.

== Influence ==
Rudyard Kipling was a major influence on one of the 20th century's most influential writers, Robert A. Heinlein. In his seminal 1959 work Starship Troopers, Heinlein models a similar society, where only veterans of government service are citizens. While this does not have to be in combat forces but may be more like being a civil servant, Heinlein's novel follows characters in the mobile infantry. Also foreshadowed is Heinlein's fondness for the competent hero, a character who – though usually bearing normal human flaws – is rugged and self-responsible, able to do most things at least on a basic level and functioning with a high level of confidence and self-actualization.
