= Promethei Terra =

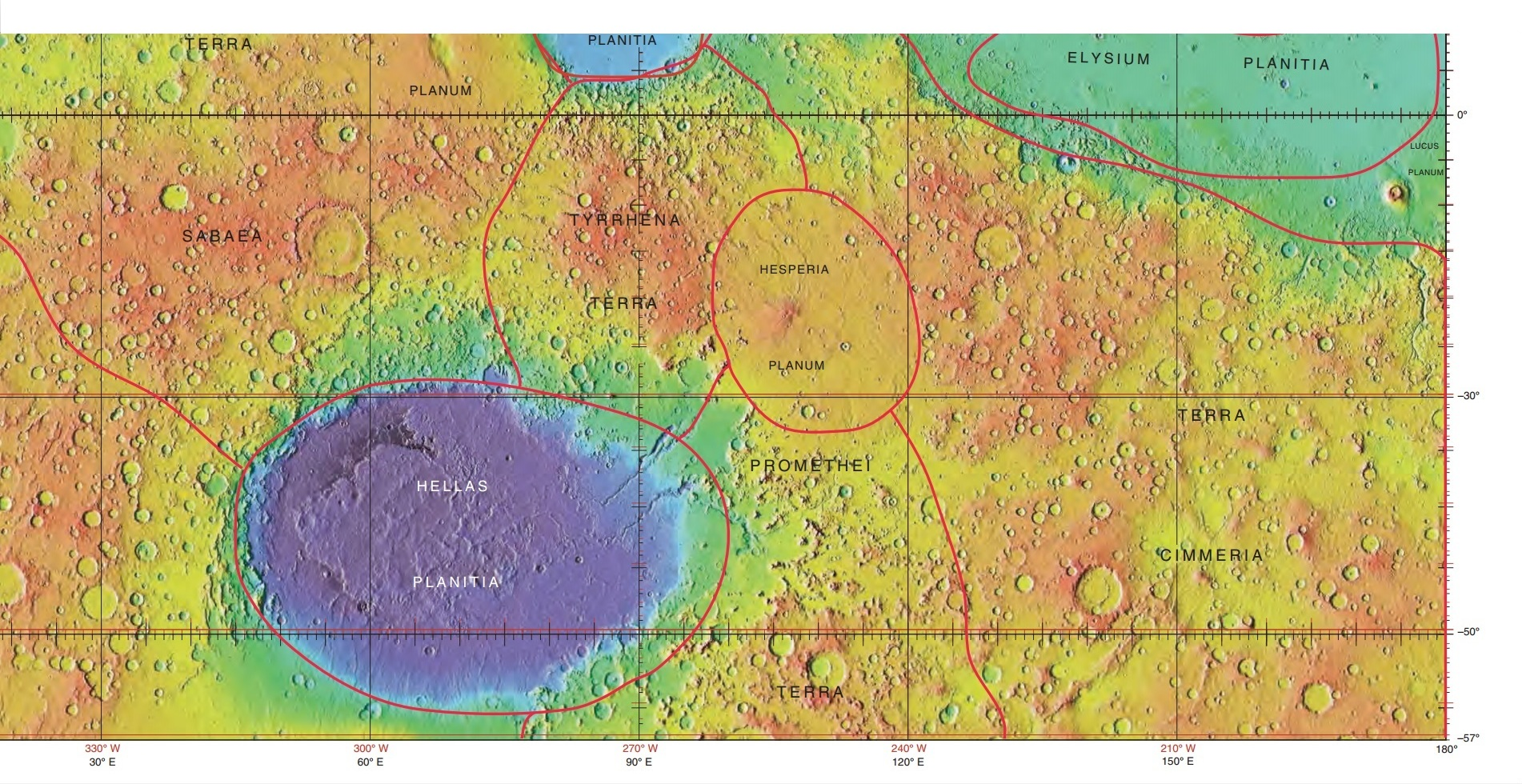
MOLA map showing boundaries of most of Promethei Terra and other nearby regions

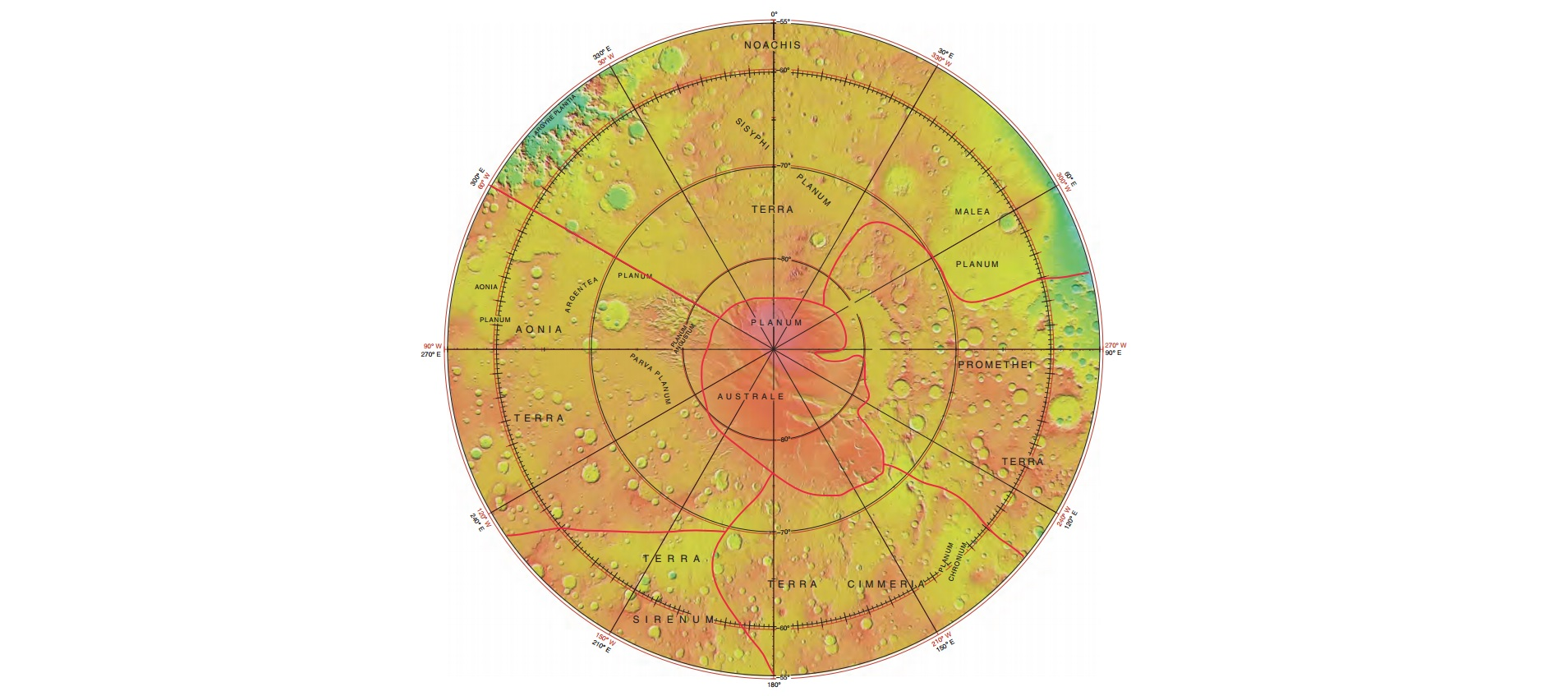
MOLA map showing boundaries of Promethei Terra near the south pole and other regions

Promethei Terra is a large Martian region covering 3300 km at its broadest extent. It lies to the east of the massive Hellas basin. Like much of the southern part of the planet it is a heavily cratered, highland region. Promethei Terra was named for a classic albedo feature of Mars, with the original name derived from that of the Greek god Prometheus. Promethei Terra lies mostly in the Hellas quadrangle of Mars.

== Lobate debris aprons ==
One very important feature common in Promethei Terra are piles of material surrounding cliffs. These materials are called lobate debris aprons (LDAs). Recently, research with the Shallow Radar on the Mars Reconnaissance Orbiter has provided strong evidence that the LDAs are glaciers that are covered with a thin layer of rocks. Large amounts of water ice are believed to be in the LDAs. Available evidence strongly suggests this area accumulated snow in the past. When the tilt (obliquity) of Mars increases the southern ice cap releases large amounts of water vapor. Climate models predict that when this occurs water vapor condenses and falls where LDAs are located. The tilt of the Earth changes little because the relatively large Moon keeps it stable. The two tiny Martian moons do not stabilize its planet, so the rotational axis of Mars undergoes large variations. It has been known for some time that Mars undergoes many large changes in its tilt or obliquity because its two small moons lack the gravity to stabilize it, as the Moon stabilizes Earth; at times the tilt has even been greater than 80 degrees

Lobate debris aprons may be a major source of water for future Mars colonists. Their major advantage over other sources of Martian water are that they can easily mapped from orbit and they are closer to the equator where crewed missions are more likely to land.

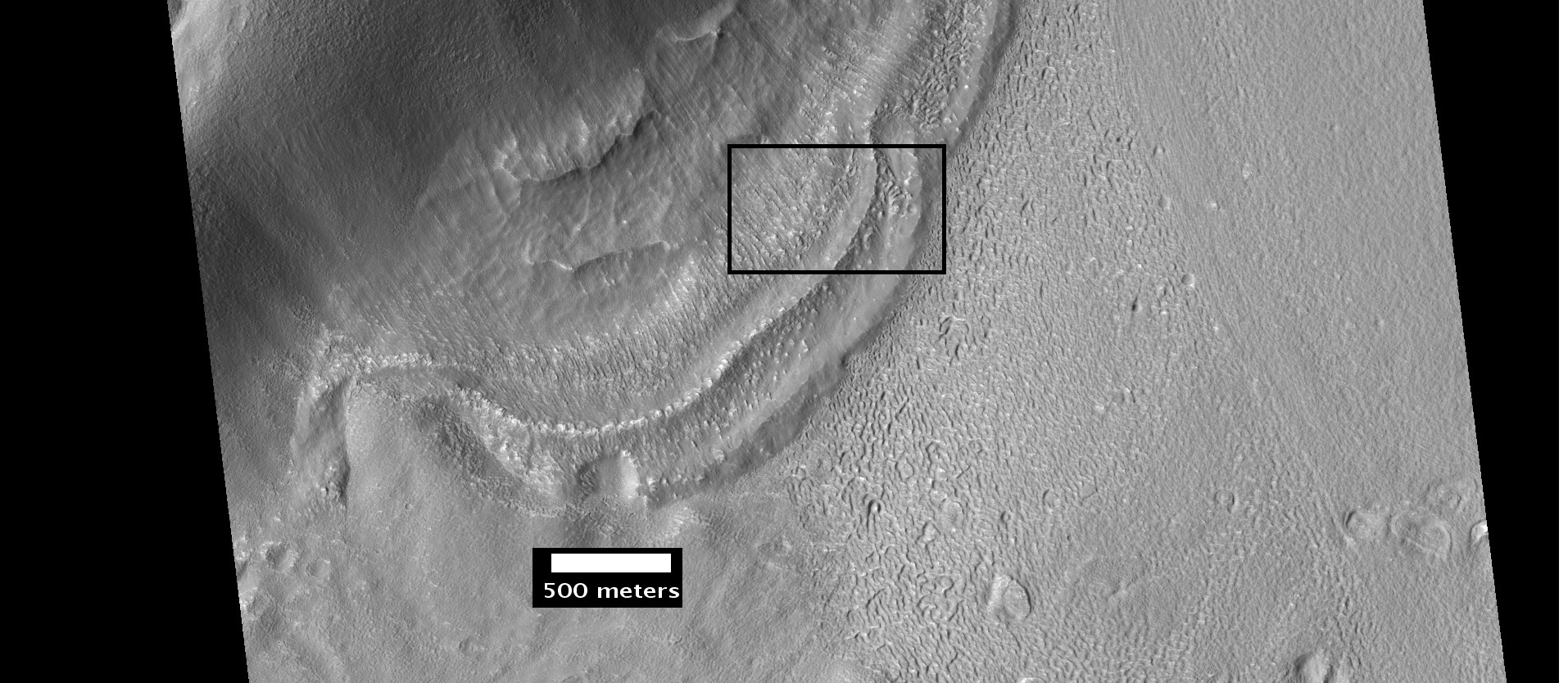
Context for the next image of the end of a flow feature, also called a lobate debris apron. It is probably a glacier. Location is Hellas quadrangle.

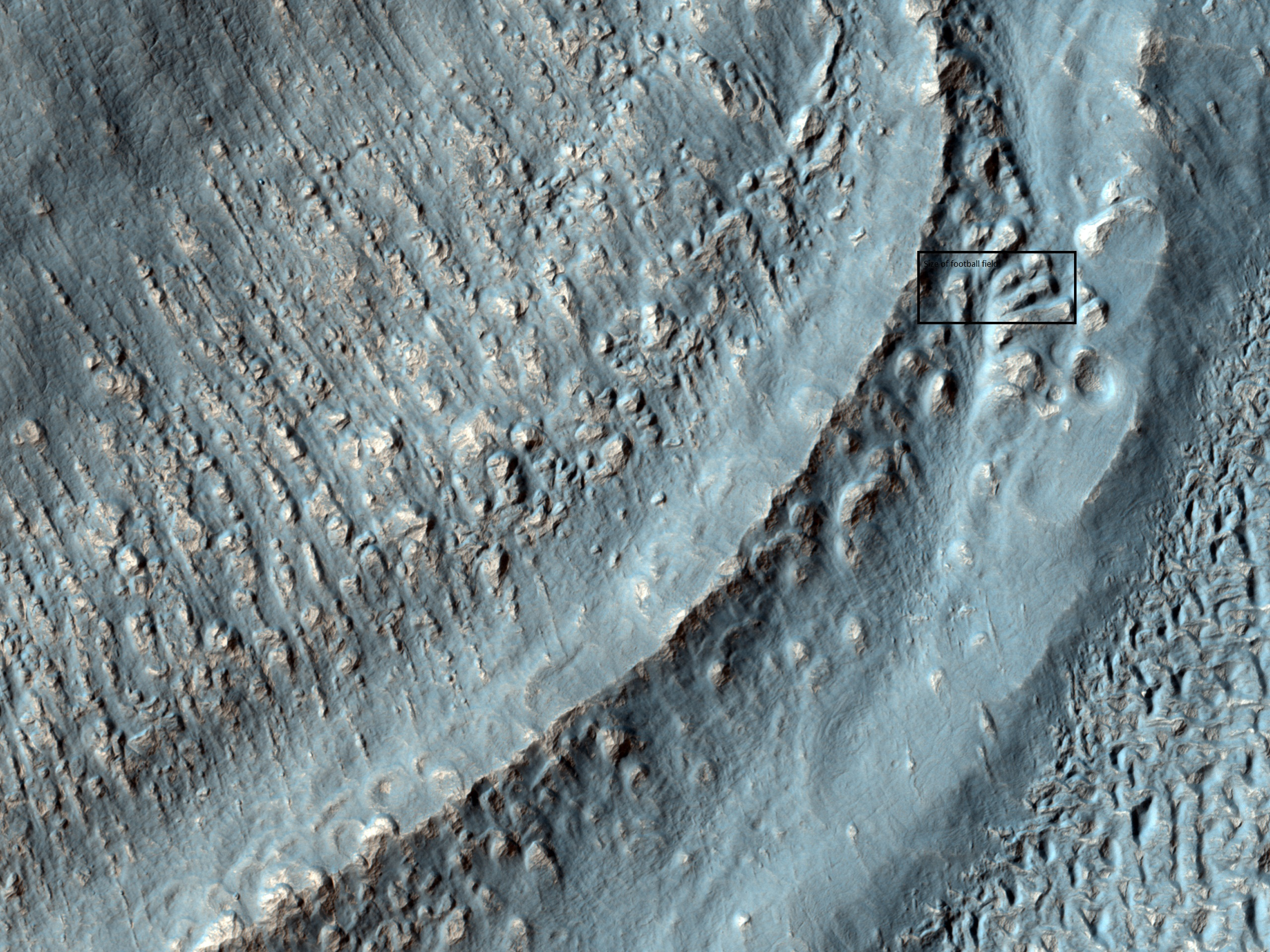
Close-up of the area in the box in the previous image. Possible terminal moraine of a glacier. For scale, the box shows the approximate size of a football field. HiRISE image.

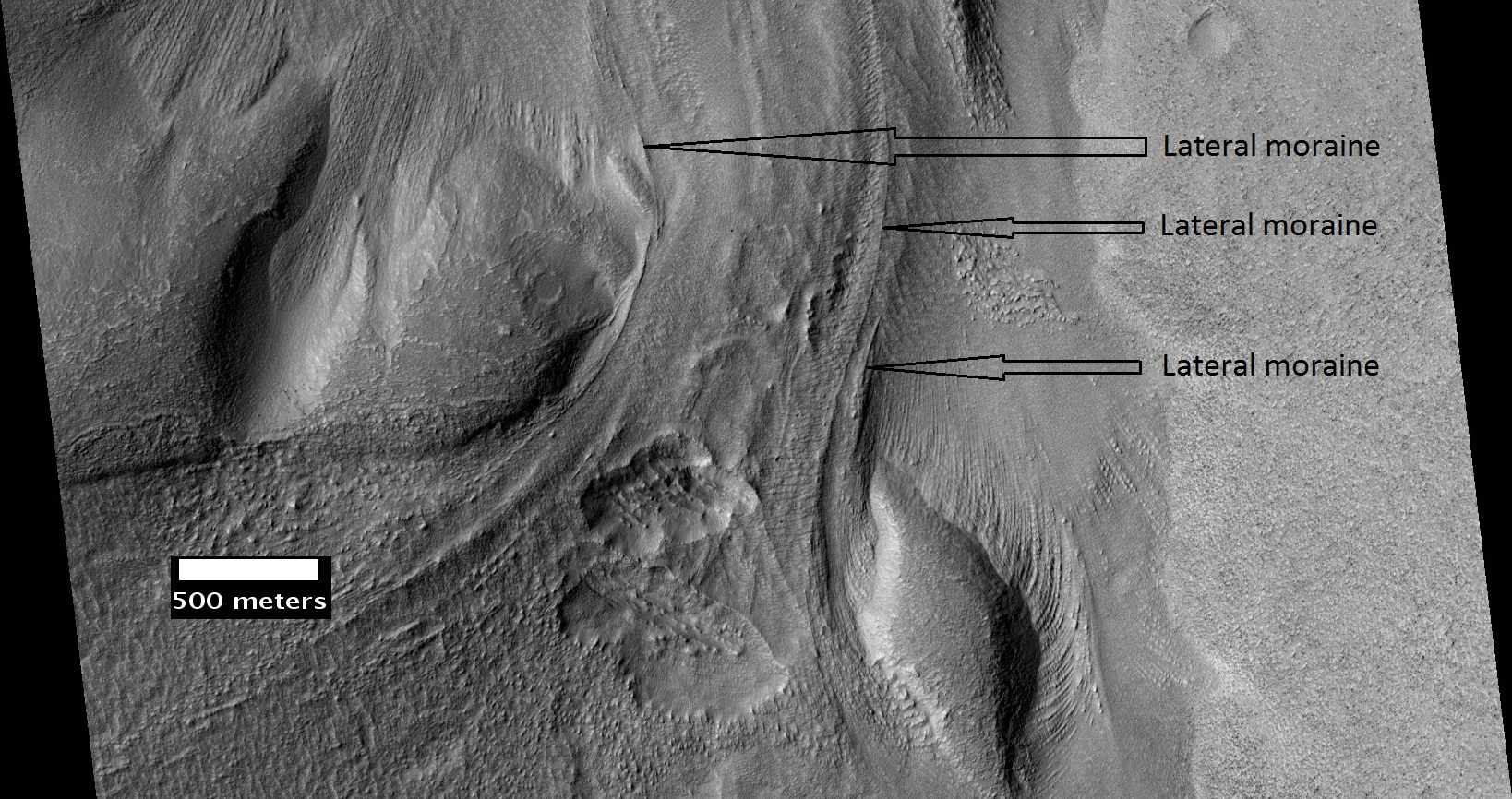
Material flowing through a crater rim. HiRISE image. Lateral moraines are labeled.

== Glacier-like forms ==
Many formations are probably glaciers or the remains of old glaciers because they look so much like glaciers on the Earth.

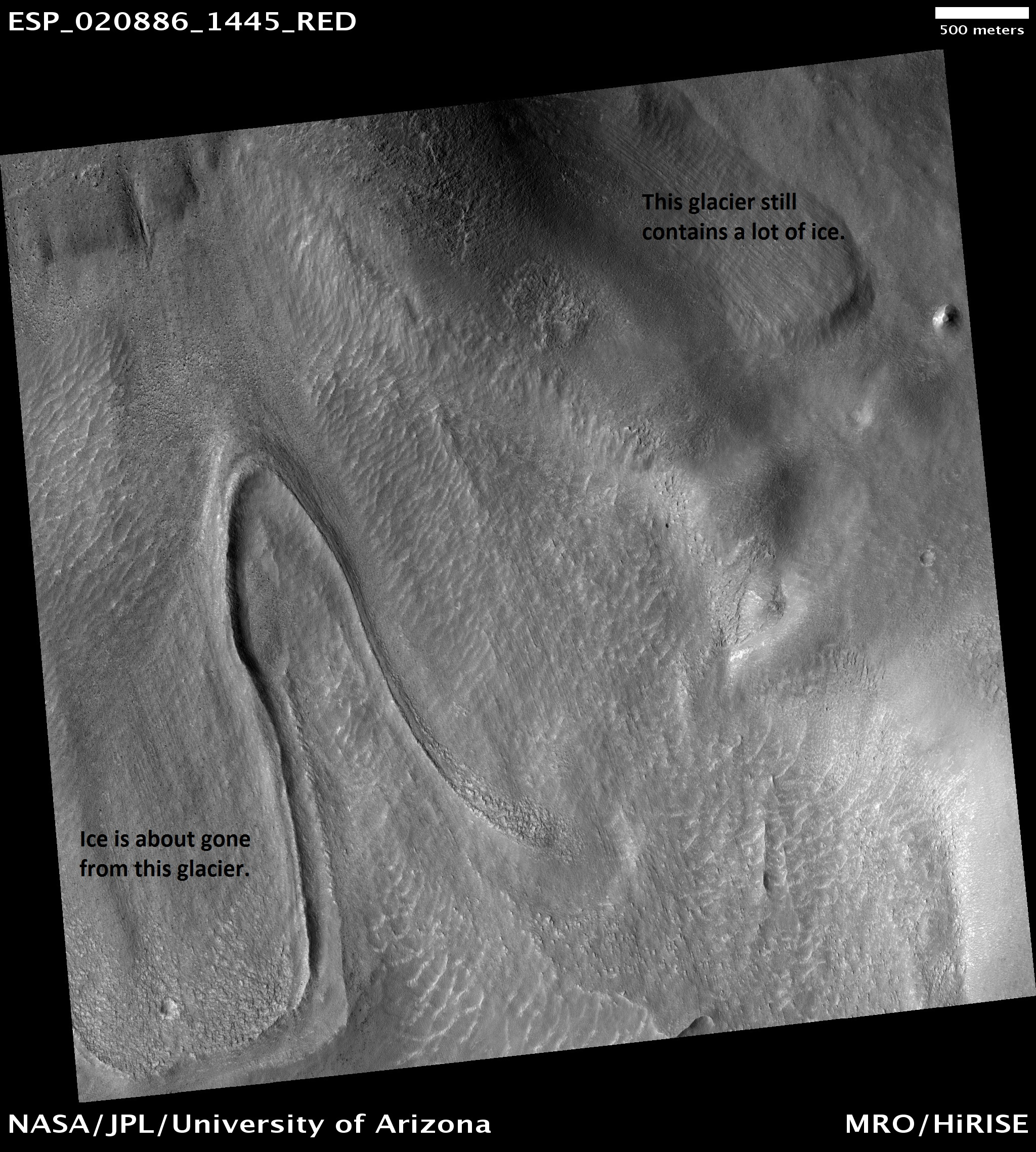
HiRISE image showing thin glacier on left. Glacier on the right is thick, containing ice under a thin layer of dirt and rock.

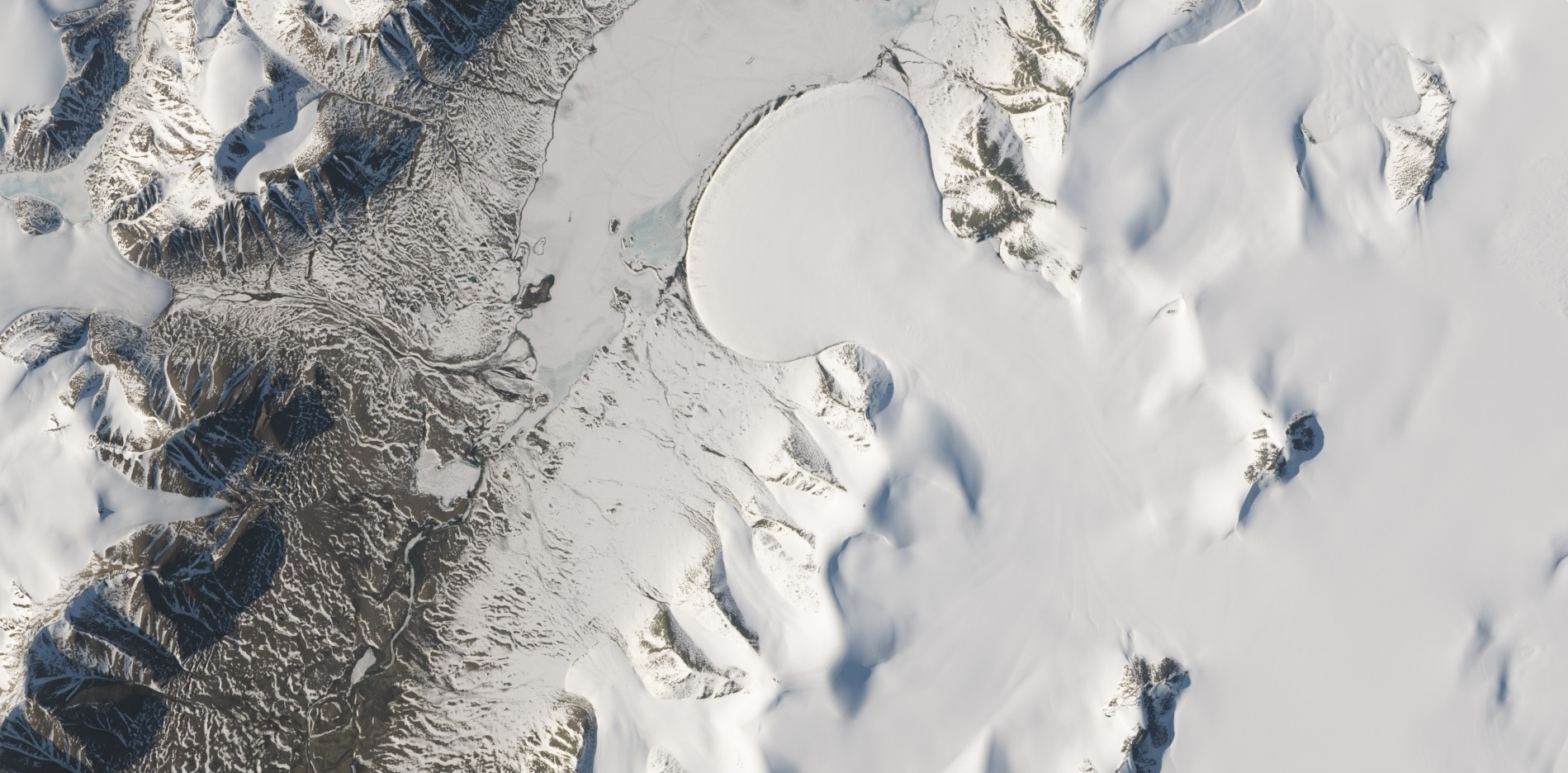
Romer Lake's Elephant Foot Glacier in the Earth's Arctic, as seen by Landsat 8. This picture shows several glaciers that have the same shape as many features on Mars that are believed to also be glaciers.

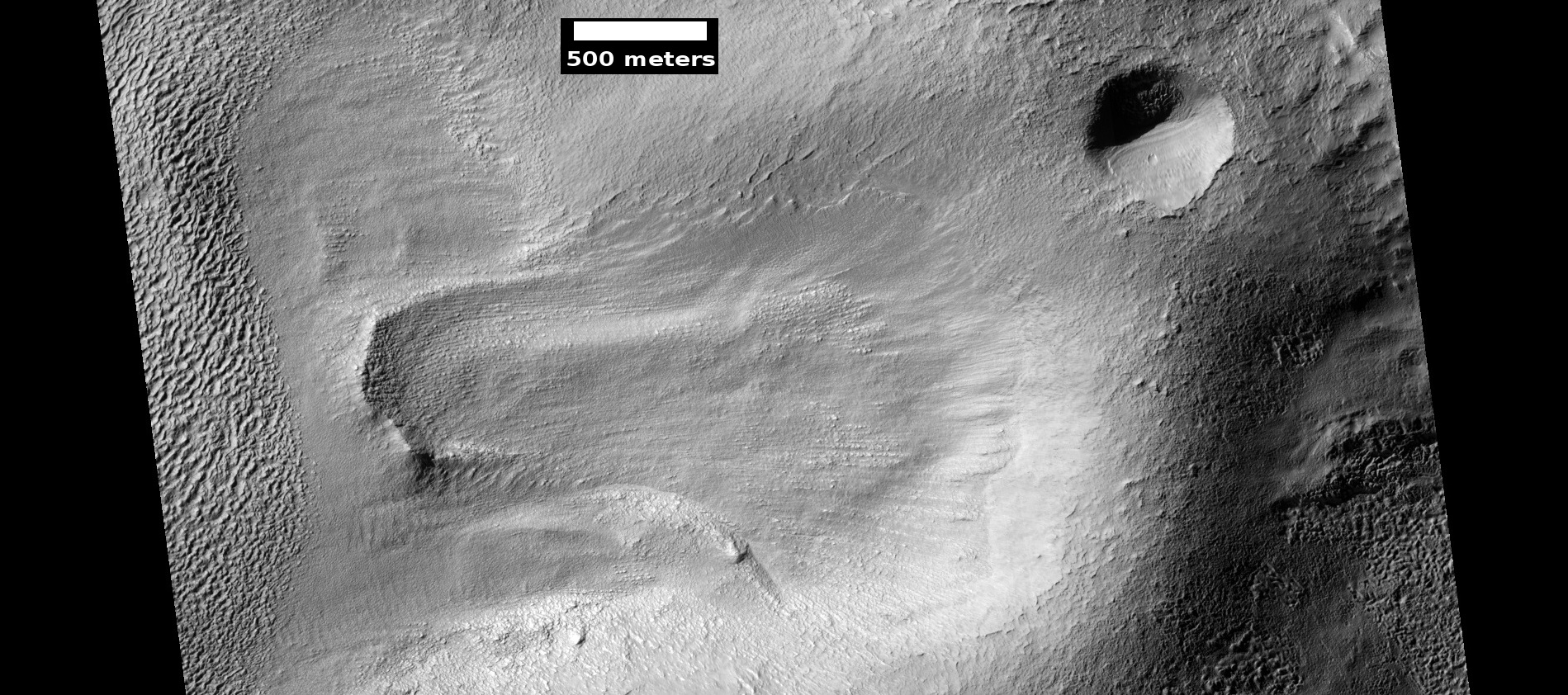
Flow feature that was probably a glacier. HiRISE image.

== Gullies ==
Gullies occur on steep slopes, especially on the walls of craters. Gullies are believed to be relatively young because they have few, if any craters. Moreover, they lie on top of sand dunes which themselves are considered to be quite young. Usually, each gully has an alcove, channel, and apron. Some studies have found that gullies occur on slopes that face all directions, others have found that the greater number of gullies are found on poleward facing slopes, especially from 30-44 S.

For years, many believed that gullies were formed by running water, but further observations demonstrate that they may be formed by dry ice. Recent studies describe using the High Resolution Imaging Science Experiment (HiRISE) camera on MRO to examine gullies at 356 sites, starting in 2006. Thirty-eight of the sites showed active gully formation. Before-and-after images demonstrated the timing of this activity coincided with seasonal carbon dioxide frost and temperatures that would not have allowed for liquid water. When dry ice frost changes to a gas, it may lubricate dry material to flow especially on steep slopes. In some years frost, perhaps as thick as 1 meter, triggers avalanches. This frost contains mostly dry ice, but also has tiny amounts of water ice.

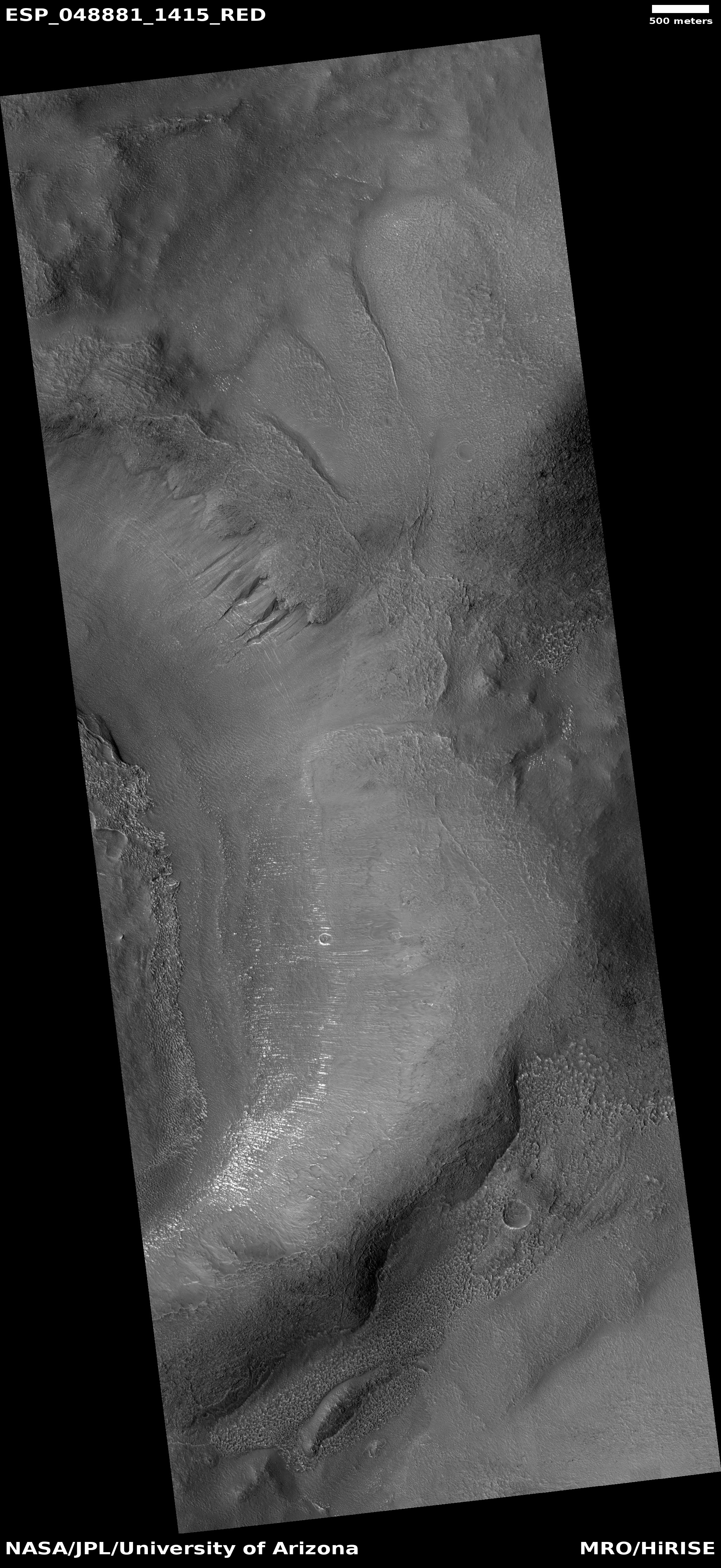
Gullies in crater. HiRISE image.

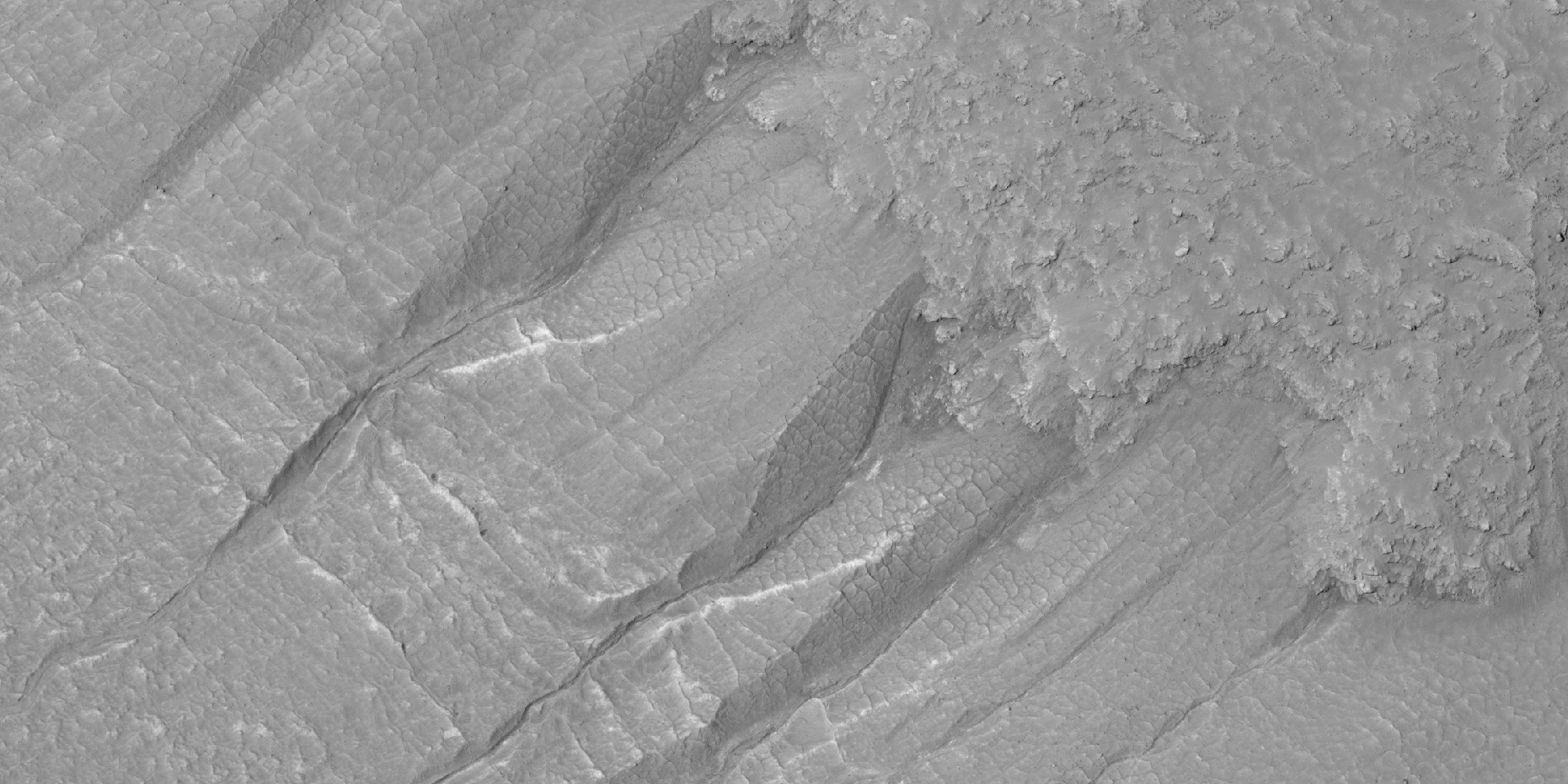
Close view of gullies in crater. Polygons are visible in this close view. HiRISE image.

== Other scenes in Promethei Terra ==
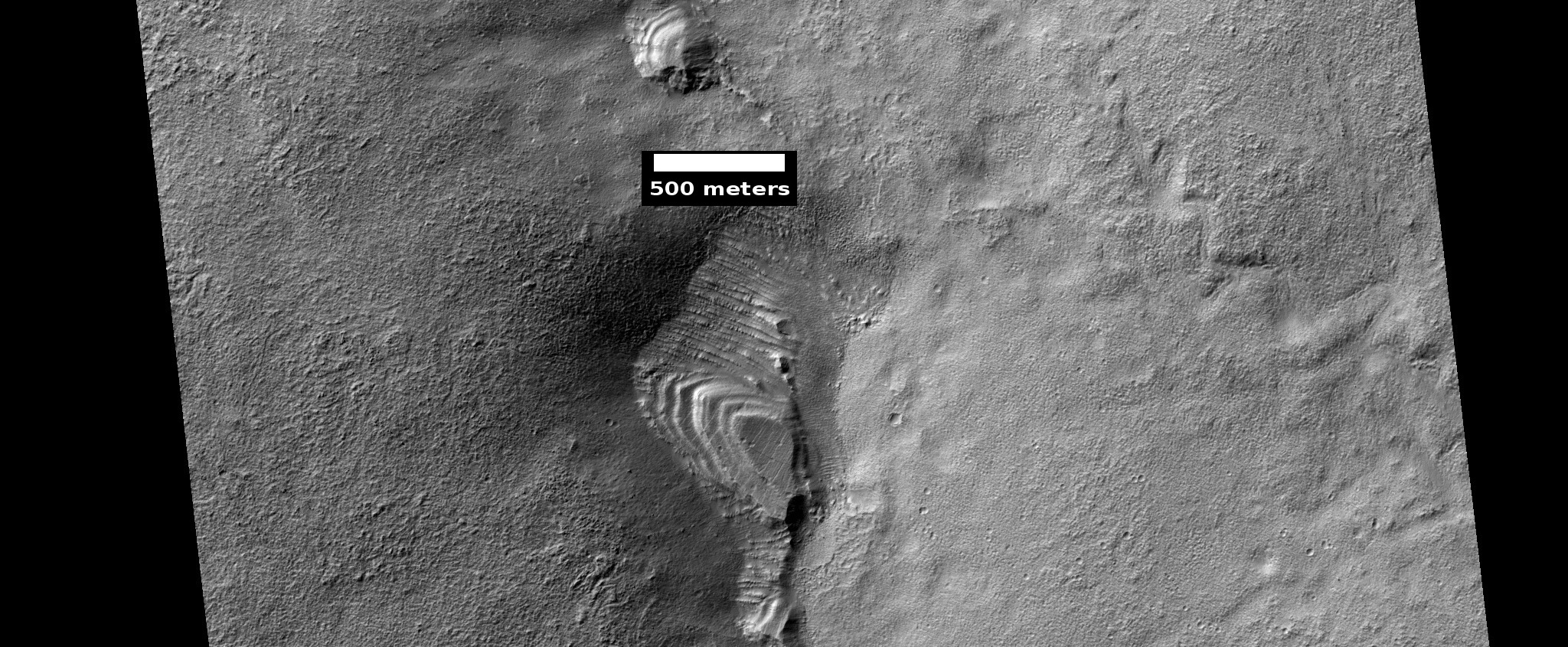
Layered feature of unknown origin. HiRISE image.

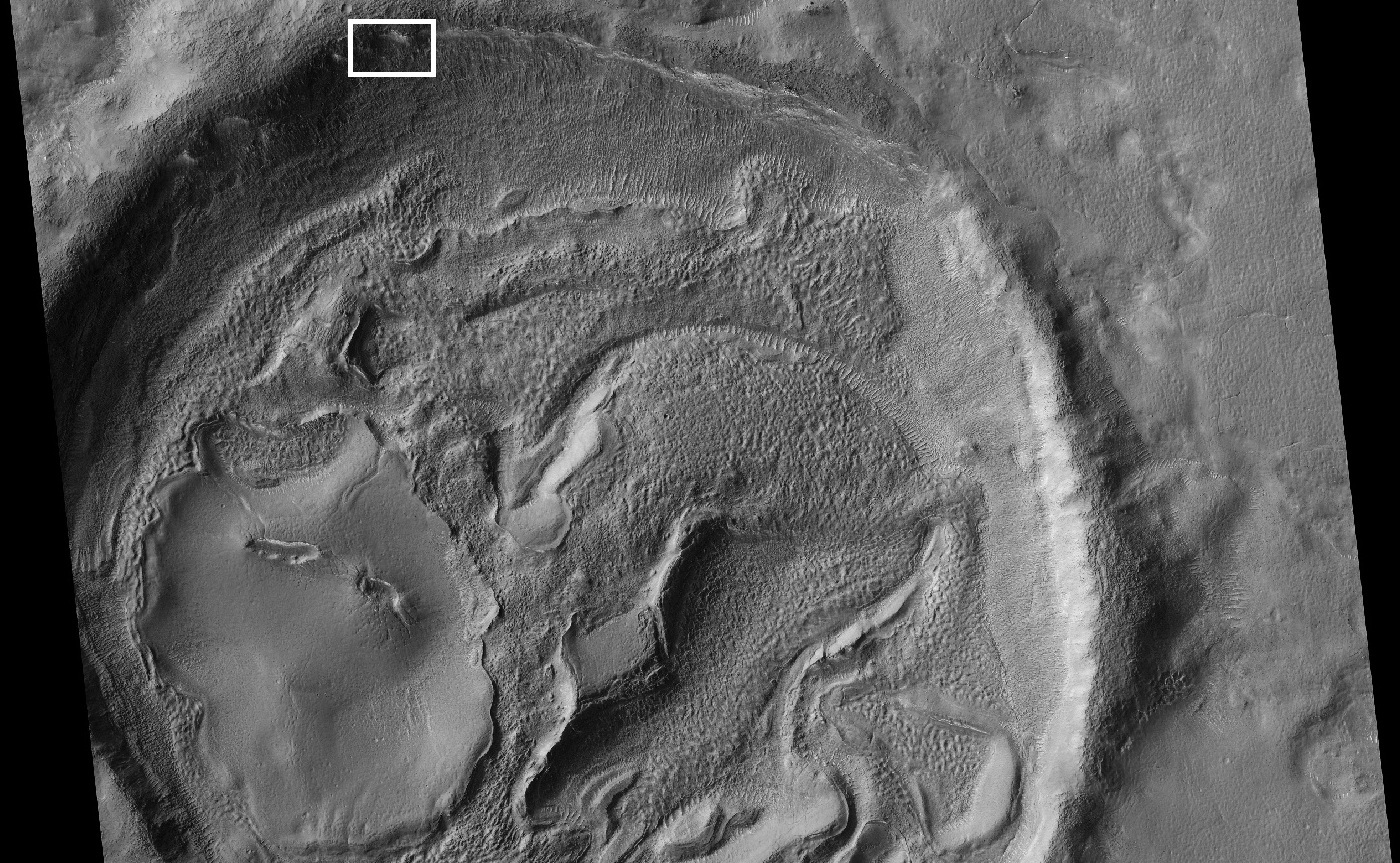
HiRISE image of crater floor. The box indicates where the next picture is located.

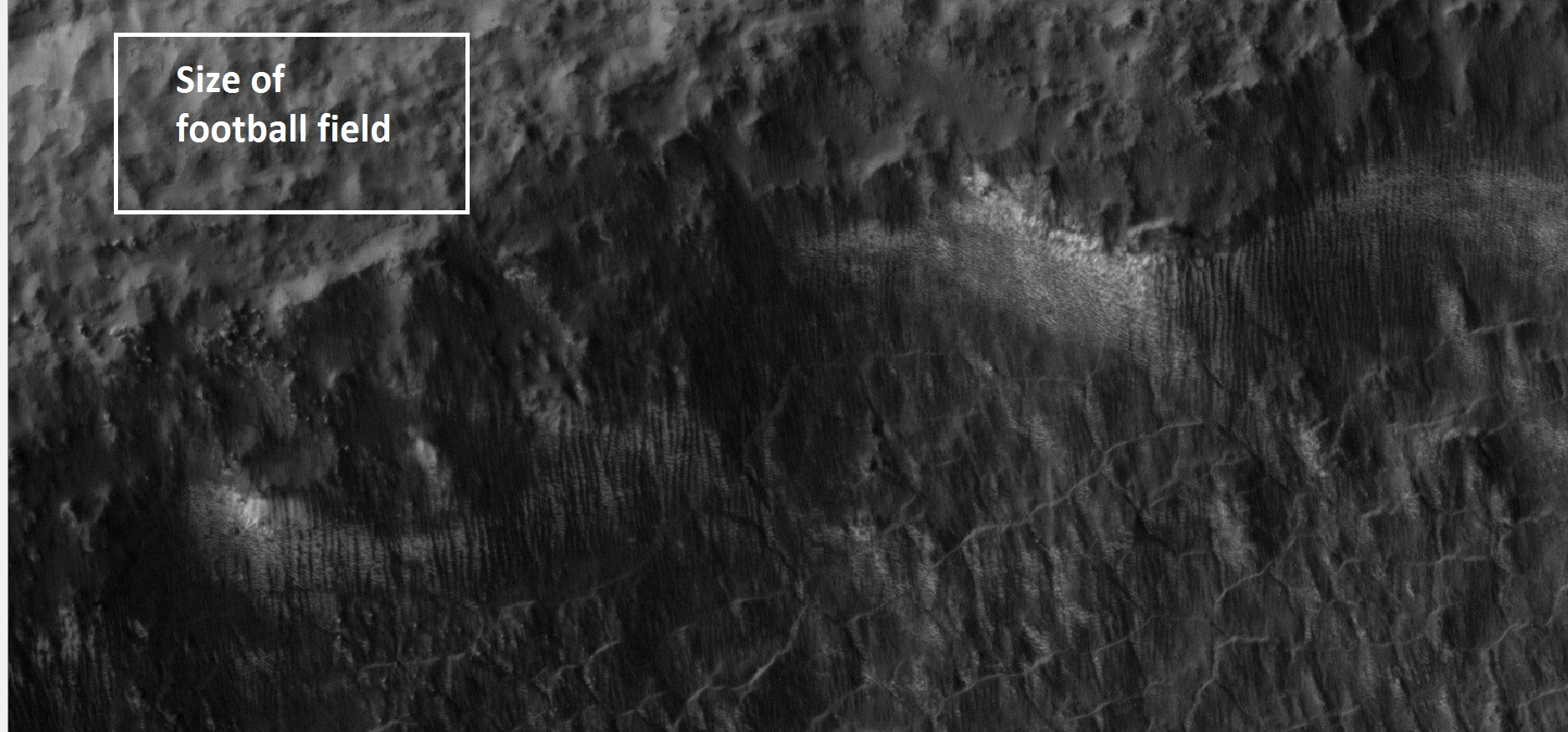
Close-up of a portion of a crater wall indicated in the previous photo. There seems to be grooves in the wall.

== See also ==
- Climate of Mars
- Glacier
- Glaciers on Mars
- Lobate debris apron
- Water on Mars
