= Virginia Heinlein =

Wife of scifi author Robert A. Heinlein (1916–2003)

Virginia "Ginny" Heinlein
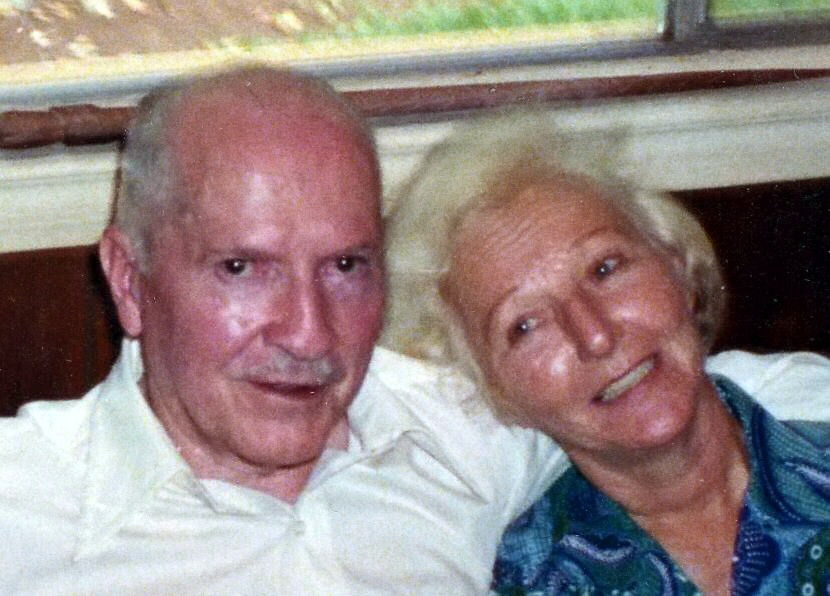
- Robert and Virginia Heinlein in 1980
- Born: Virginia Doris Gerstenfeld; April 22, 1916; New York City, U.S.
- Died: January 18, 2003 (aged 86); Atlantic Beach, Florida, U.S.
- Education: New York University
- Occupations: Chemist, biochemist, lieutenant commander USN
- Known for: Founder of The Heinlein Society
- Spouse: Robert A. Heinlein (m. 1948–1988)

Virginia Doris Heinlein (nee Gerstenfeld; April 22, 1916 – January 18, 2003) was an American chemist, biochemist, engineer, and the third wife and muse of Robert A. Heinlein, a prominent and successful author often considered one of the "Big Three" of science fiction (along with Isaac Asimov and Arthur C. Clarke).

== Life and career ==
Born to George Joseph and Jeanne D Gerstenfeld (nee Rosenthal)', Virginia was raised in Brooklyn with her brother Leon. An organic chemist and biochemist, she served as an inspiration for many of the active and talented red-haired women in Heinlein's stories. She met Robert when they both worked at the Naval Air Experimental Station in Philadelphia when she was a lieutenant in the WAVES in the U.S. Navy in World War II. She moved to Los Angeles in 1946 to take an advanced degree, where Heinlein had already relocated after the war. They married on October 21, 1948, in Raton, New Mexico. Shortly thereafter they moved to Colorado, but in 1965 her health was chronically affected by the altitude, so the couple moved to Bonny Doon, California.

Prior to a trip to the Soviet Union, where they happened to be when Francis Gary Powers was shot down, Virginia learned to speak Russian, which proved invaluable in talking with local citizens. She was highly esteemed among her husband's fans for her exceptional willingness to correspond with them, a practice that continued until her last days, with activity in a Usenet newsgroup devoted to Heinlein fans. She was touched when other users sent her Mother's Day greetings as an homage to her bestowing the title of "Heinlein's Children" on Robert's fans worldwide.

Heinlein scholar Philip H. Owenby credits Virginia's work in her husband's career when he was living and her involvement in the preservation of his legacy after Robert's death for the Heinlein brand's enduring success. After Robert's death in 1988, she moved from California to Florida, where she edited a collection of his letters and writings, published in 1989 as Grumbles from the Grave. In the introduction to Grumbles to the Grave, Virginia writes that throughout the 1960s, she progressively took responsibility for handling the business side (“...record keeping, information on sales, taxes, and some of the correspondence.”) of Heinlein’s career, to the point that when he fell seriously ill in 1970, she had already been keeping the Heinlein brand running for years. She authorised the publication of Tramp Royale and longer editions of previously published works Stranger in a Strange Land, The Puppet Masters, and Red Planet. In 1997 she established a literary society in her husband's name, the Heinlein Society.

Following Virginia's death in 2003, the Heinlein Journal published a special edition dedicated to celebrating her and her contributions to Robert's career.
