= Timeline of religion =

Religion has been a factor of the human experience throughout history, from pre-historic to modern times. The bulk of the human religious experience pre-dates recorded history, which is roughly 7,000 years old. A lack of written records results in most of the knowledge of pre-historic religion being derived from archaeological records and other indirect sources, and from suppositions. Much pre-historic religion is subject to continued debate.

== Religious practices in prehistory ==
=== Middle Paleolithic (200,000 BCE – 50,000 BCE) ===
Whether or not Neanderthals had religion is a topic of debate among scholars. Some reject the idea of religion in the lower paleolithic, while others argue it is plausible, though the evidence of cave bear worship or ceremonies is often seen as circumstantial.

- 100,000 BCE: Earliest known human burial in West Asia.
- 78,000 BCE – 74,000 BCE: Earliest known Homo sapiens burial of a child in Panga ya Saidi in eastern Africa.
- 70,000 BCE – 35,000 BCE: Neanderthal burials take place in areas of Europe and West Asia.

=== 50th to 11th millennium BCE ===
- 40,000 BCE: The remains of one of the earliest known anatomically modern humans to be discovered cremated, was buried near Lake Mungo in Australia.
- 38,000 BCE: The Aurignacian Löwenmensch figurine, the oldest known zoomorphic (animal-shaped) sculpture in the world and one of the oldest known sculptures in general, was made. The sculpture has also been interpreted as anthropomorphic, giving human characteristics to an animal, although it may have represented a deity.
- 35,000 BCE – 26,001 BCE: Neanderthal burials are absent from the archaeological record. This roughly coincides with the appearance of Homo sapiens in Europe and decline of the Neanderthals; individual skulls and/or long bones began appearing, heavily stained with red ochre and separately buried. This practice may be the origin of sacred relics. The oldest discovered "Venus figurines" appeared in graves. Some were deliberately broken or repeatedly stabbed, possibly representing the murders of the men with whom they were buried.
- 25,000 BCE – 21,000 BCE: Clear examples of burials are present in Iberia, Wales, and eastern Europe. These, too, incorporate the heavy use of red ochre. Additionally, various objects were included in the graves (e.g. periwinkle shells, weighted clothing, dolls, possible drumsticks, mammoth ivory beads, fox teeth pendants, panoply of ivory artifacts, "baton" antlers, flint blades etc.).
- 13,000 BCE – 8,000 BCE: Noticeable burial activity resumed. Prior mortuary activity had either taken a less obvious form or contemporaries retained some of their burial knowledge in the absence of such activity. Dozens of men, women, and children were being buried in the same caves which were used for burials 10,000 years beforehand. All these graves are delineated by the cave walls and large limestone blocks. The burials share a number of characteristics (such as use of ochre, and shell and mammoth ivory jewellery) that go back thousands of years. Some burials were double, comprising an adult male with a juvenile male buried by his side. They were now beginning to take on the form of modern cemeteries. Old burials were commonly re-dug and moved to make way for new ones, with the older bones often being gathered and cached together. Large stones may have acted as grave markers. Pairs of ochred antlers were sometimes mounted on poles within the cave; this is compared to the modern practice of leaving flowers at a grave.

=== 10th to 6th millennium BCE ===
- 10,000 BCE – 8,000 BCE: The Baghor stone from presumably one of the oldest Shakti shrines in India, and one of the oldest sites of worship yet discovered in the world, is estimated to have been formed during this period (9000-8000 BC). However, it may predate 10,000 BC as samples were dated to 11,870 (± 120) YBP in a 1983 publication. The living shrine at which it was found is currently used as a place for worshipping Devi by Hindus. The triangular shape of the stone is that of the Kali Yantra which is also still in use across India. The Kol and Baiga tribes consider the triangular shape to symbolise the mother goddess 'Mai', variously named Kerai, Kari, Kali, Kalika or Karika.
- 9130 BCE – 8000 BCE: This was the apparent period of use of Göbekli Tepe with the earliest dates back to 9500 calBC, one of the oldest human-made sites of worship yet discovered; evidence of similar usage has also been found in another nearby site, Nevalı Çori.
- 7500 BCE – 5700 BCE: The settlements of Çatalhöyük developed as a likely spiritual center of Anatolia. Possibly practising worship in communal shrines, its inhabitants left behind numerous clay figurines and impressions of phallic, feminine, and hunting scenes.
- 7250 BCE – 6500 BCE: The Ayn Ghazal statues were made in Jordan during the Neolithic. These statues were argued to have been gods, legendary leaders, or other figures of power. They were suggested to have been a representation of a fusion of previously separate communities by Gary O. Rollefson.

== Before Common Era (BCE) ==
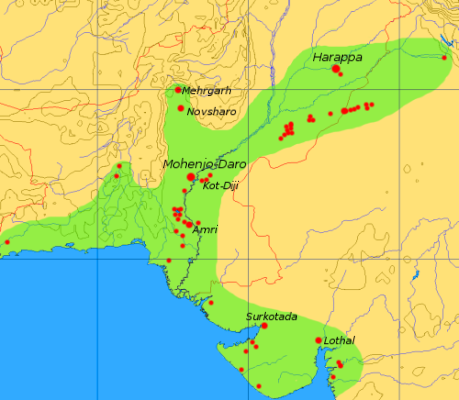
Extent and major sites of the Indus Valley Civilisation. The shaded area does not include recent excavations.

- Late 4th millennium BCE: Sumerian Cuneiform emerged from the proto-literate Uruk period, allowing the codification of beliefs and creation of detailed historical religious records.
- 3200 BCE – 3100 BCE: Newgrange, the 250,000 short tons (230,000 t) passage tomb aligned to the winter solstice in Ireland, was built.
- 3100 BCE: The initial form of Stonehenge was completed. The circular bank and ditch enclosure, about 110 metres (360 ft) across, may have been completed with a timber circle.
- 2900 BCE: The second phase of Stonehenge was completed and appeared to function as the first enclosed cremation cemetery in the British Isles.
- 2635 BCE – 2610 BCE: The oldest surviving Egyptian pyramid was commissioned by Pharaoh Djoser.
- 2600 BCE: Stonehenge began to take on its final form. The wooden posts were replaced with bluestone. It began taking on an increasingly complex setup (including an altar, a portal, station stones, etc.) and shows consideration of solar alignments.
- 2560 BCE: This is the approximate time accepted as the completion of the Great Pyramid of Giza, the oldest pyramid of the Giza Plateau.
- 2400 BCE – 2300 BCE: The first of the oldest surviving religious texts, the Pyramid Texts, was composed in Ancient Egypt.
- 2200 BCE: The Minoan civilization developed in Crete. Citizens worshipped a variety of goddesses.
- 2150–2000 BCE: The earliest surviving versions of the Sumerian Epic of Gilgamesh—originally titled He who Saw the Deep (Sha naqba īmuru) or Surpassing All Other Kings (Shūtur eli sharrī)—were written.
- 2000-1500 BCE: The people of Canaan occupy the southern Levant region developing the oldest known origin of the beliefs of Judaism.
- 1600 BCE: The ancient development of Stonehenge came to an end.
- 1500 BCE: The Vedic period began in India after the collapse of the Indus Valley Civilisation.
- 1500 BCE – 1000 BCE: The oldest of the Hindu Vedas (scriptures), the Rigveda was composed. This is the first mention of Rudra, a fearsome form of Shiva as the supreme god.
- 1353 BCE or 1351 BCE: The beginning of the reign of Akhenaten, sometimes credited with starting the earliest known recorded monolatristic religion, in Ancient Egypt.
- 1300 BCE – 1046 BCE: The polytheistic religion of the Chinese Shang dynasty reached its mature form.
- 1300 BCE – 1000 BCE: The "standard" Akkadian version of the Epic of Gilgamesh was edited by Sîn-lēqi-unninni.
- 1200 BCE – 800 BCE: Religion during the Greek Dark Ages is seen to be a continuation of Bronze Age Greek Religion. This period ended in 800 BCE.
- 1200 BCE: The Olmecs built the earliest pyramids and temples in Central America.
- 877 BCE – 777 BCE: The life of Pārśvanātha, 23rd Tirthankara of Jainism.
- 800 BCE – 300 BCE: The Upanishads (Vedic texts) were composed, containing the earliest emergence of some of the central religious concepts of Hinduism and Buddhism.
- 8th to 6th centuries BCE: The Chandogya Upanishad is compiled, significant for containing the earliest to date mention of Krishna. Verse 3.17.6 mentions Krishna Devakiputra (Sanskrit: कृष्णाय देवकीपुत्रा) as a student of the sage Ghora Angirasa.
- 6th century BCE: Possible start of Zoroastrianism; Zoroastrianism flourished under the Persian emperors known as the Achaemenids. The emperors Darius (ruled 522–486 BCE) and Xerxes I (ruled 486–465 BCE) made it the official religion of their empire.
- 5th century BCE: The first five books of the Jewish Tanakh, the Torah (Hebrew: תורה), are probably compiled.
- 551 BCE: Confucius, founder of Confucianism, was born.
- 600 BCE – 500 BCE: The earliest Confucian writing, Shu Ching, incorporates ideas of harmony and heaven.
- 599 BCE – 527 BCE: The life of Mahavira, 24th and last Tirthankara of Jainism.
- c. 570 BCE: Pythagoras, founder of Pythagoreanism, was born.
- 563 BCE – 400 BCE: Siddhartha Gautama, founder of Buddhism, was born.
- 515 BCE – 70 CE: Second Temple period. The synagogue and Jewish eschatology can all be traced back to this period.
- 447 BCE: The Parthenon is dedicated to the goddess Athena.
- 399 BCE: Socrates was tried for impiety.
- 369 BCE – 372 BCE: Birth of Mencius and Zhuang Zhou.
- 300 BCE: The oldest known version of the Tao Te Ching was written on bamboo tablets.
- 300 BCE: Theravada Buddhism was introduced to Sri Lanka by the Venerable Mahinda.
- c. 250 BCE: The Third Buddhist council was convened by Ashoka. Ashoka sends Buddhist missionaries to faraway countries, such as China, mainland Southeast Asia, Malay kingdoms, and Hellenistic kingdoms.
- c. 200 BCE: Worship of Yahweh's consort Asherah ends in Israel.
- 140 BCE: The earliest grammar of Sanskrit literature was composed by Pāṇini.
- 140 BCE – 200 CE: The Development of the Hebrew Bible canon.
- 100 BCE – 400 CE: The Yoga Sutras of Patanjali, one of the oldest texts in Yoga, were composed.

== Common Era (CE) ==
=== 1st to 5th centuries ===
- 6-4 BCE – 30 or 33 CE: The life of Jesus of Nazareth, the central figure of Christianity.
- 8 CE: Ovid's Metamorphoses chronicles the history of the world from its creation to the deification of Julius Caesar.
- 27 CE – 31 CE: The death of John the Baptist.
- 12 CE – 38 CE: According to the Haran Gawaita, Nasoraean Mandaean disciples of John the Baptist flee persecution in Jerusalem and arrive in Media during the reign of a Parthian king identified as Artabanus II who ruled between 12 and 38 CE.
- 50 CE – 62 CE: The first Christian Council was convened in Jerusalem.
- 70 CE: The Siege of Jerusalem, the Destruction of the Temple, and the rise of Rabbinic Judaism.
- c. 70 CE: The Gospel of Mark is written.
- c. 80 – c. 90 CE: The Gospel of Luke is written.
- c. 80 – c. 90 CE: The Gospel of Matthew is written.
- c. 90 – c. 100 CE: The Gospel of John is written.
- 150 – 250: Nagarjuna, Indian Mahayana Buddhist, philosopher and founder of Madhyamaka-Sunyavada Buddhism
- 200: Some of the oldest parts of the Ginza Rabba, a core text of Mandaeism, were written.
- 216: Mani, founder and prophet of Manichaeism, is born.
- 250 – 900: Classic Mayan step pyramids were constructed.
- 313: The Edict of Milan decreed religious toleration in the Roman empire.
- 325: The first ecumenical council (the Council of Nicaea) was convened to attain a consensus on doctrine through an assembly representing all Christendom. It established the original Nicene Creed and fixed the date of Easter. It also confirmed the primacy of the Sees of Rome, Alexandria and Antioch, and granted the See of Jerusalem a position of honour.
- c. 350: The oldest record of the complete biblical texts (the Codex Sinaiticus) survives in a Greek translation called the Septuagint, dating to the 4th century CE.
- 380: Theodosius I declared Nicene Christianity the state religion of the Roman Empire.
- 381: The second ecumenical council (the First Council of Constantinople) reaffirmed and revised the Nicene Creed, repudiating Arianism and Pneumatomachi.
- 381 – 391: Theodosius outlaws paganism within the Roman Empire. Laws enacted requiring death penalty for acts of Divination.
- 393: A council of early Christian bishops listed and approved a biblical canon for the first time at the Synod of Hippo.
- 400: Saint Augustine exhorts his congregation to smash all pagan artefacts, saying "for that all superstition of pagans and heathens should be annihilated is what God wants, God commands, God proclaims!"

== Middle Ages (5th–15th centuries) ==
=== 5th to 10th centuries ===
- 405: Jerome completed the Vulgate, the first Latin translation of the Bible.
- 410: The Western Roman Empire began to decline, signalling the onset of the Middle Ages.
- 424: The Church of the East in Sasanian Empire (Persia) formally separated from the See of Antioch and proclaimed full ecclesiastical independence.
- 431: The third ecumenical council (the First Council of Ephesus) was convened as a result of the controversial teachings of Nestorius of Constantinople. It repudiated Nestorianism, proclaimed the Virgin Mary as the Theotokos (the God-bearer or Mother of God). It also repudiated Pelagianism and again reaffirmed the Nicene Creed.
- 449: The Second Council of Ephesus declared support for Eutyches and attacked his opponents. Originally convened as an ecumenical council, its ecumenical nature was rejected by the Chalcedonians, who denounced the council as latrocinium.
- 451: The fourth ecumenical council (the Council of Chalcedon) rejected the Eutychian doctrine of monophysitism, adopting instead the Chalcedonian Creed. It reinstated those deposed in 449, deposed Dioscorus of Alexandria and elevated the bishoprics of Constantinople and Jerusalem to the status of patriarchates.
- 451: The Oriental Orthodox Churches rejected the Christological view put forth by the Council of Chalcedon and were excommunicated.
- 480 – 547: Benedict of Nursia wrote his Rule, laying the foundation of Western Christian monasticism.
- 553: The fifth ecumenical council (the Second Council of Constantinople) repudiated the Three Chapters as Nestorian and condemned Origen of Alexandria.
- c. 570 – 632: The life of the Islamic prophet Muhammad.
- 632: Work began on the compilation of the Quran into the form of a book (soon to be known as Mashaf-ul-Hafsa), in the era of Abu Bakr, the first Caliph of Islam.
- 632 – 661: The Rashidun Caliphate heralded the Arab conquest of Persia, Egypt and Iraq, bringing Islam to those regions.
- 661 – 750: The Umayyad Caliphate brought the Arab conquest of North Africa, Spain and Central Asia, marking the greatest extent of the Arab conquests and bringing Islam to those regions.
- 680 – 681: The sixth ecumenical council (the Third Council of Constantinople) rejected Monothelitism and Monoenergism.
- c. 680: The division between Sunni Islam and Shia Islam developed.
- 692: The Quinisext Council (also known as the Council in Trullo), an amendment to the 5th and 6th ecumenical councils, established the Pentarchy.
- 712: The Kojiki, the oldest Shinto text, was written.
- 754: The latrocinium Council of Hieria supported iconoclasm.
- 787: The seventh ecumenical council (the Second Council of Nicaea) restored the veneration of icons and denounced iconoclasm.
- 788 – 820: The life of Hindu philosopher Adi Shankara, who consolidated the doctrine of Advaita Vedanta.
- c. 850: The oldest extant manuscripts of the vocalised Masoretic Text, upon which modern editions are based, date to 9th century CE.

=== 11th to 15th centuries ===
- 1017 – 1137: Life of the founder of Vishishtadvaita Vedanta, philosopher and social reformer Ramanuja
- c. 1052 – c. 1135: The life of Milarepa, one of the most famous yogis and poets of Tibetan Buddhism.
- 1054: The Great Schism between the Roman Catholic and Eastern Orthodox churches was formalised.
- 1095 – 1099: The First Crusade led to the capture of Jerusalem.
- 1107 – 1110: Sigurd I of Norway led the Norwegian Crusade against Muslims in Spain, the Balearic Islands and in Palestine.
- 1147 – 1149: The Second Crusade was waged in response to the fall of the County of Edessa.
- 1189 – 1192: In the Third Crusade European leaders attempted to reconquer the Holy Land from Saladin.
- 1200: The earliest Mabinogion texts are compiled, cataloguing Celtic mythology in Middle Welsh.
- 1202 – 1204: The Fourth Crusade, originally intended to recapture Jerusalem, instead led to the sack of Constantinople, capital of the Byzantine Empire.
- 1206: The Delhi Sultanate was established.
- 1209 – 1229: The Albigensian Crusade was conducted to eliminate Catharism in Occitania, Europe.
- 1217 – 1221: With the Fifth Crusade, Christian leaders led another failed attempt to recapture Jerusalem.
- 1220: Snorri Sturluson authors the Prose Edda, cataloguing the beliefs of Norse Paganism.
- 1222 – 1282: The life of Nichiren Daishonin, the Buddha of the Latter Day of the Law and founder of Nichiren Buddhism. Based at the Nichiren Shoshu Head Temple Taisekiji (Japan), this branch of Buddhism teaches the importance of chanting the mantra Nam Myōhō Renge Kyō.
- 1228 – 1229: The Sixth Crusade won control of large areas of the Holy Land for Christian rulers, more through diplomacy than through fighting.
- 1229: The Codex Gigas was completed by Herman the Recluse in the Benedictine monastery of Podlažice near Chrudim.
- 1238 – 1317: Life of philosopher Madhvacharya, founder of Dvaita Vedanta
- 1244: Jerusalem was sacked again, instigating the Seventh Crusade.
- 1270: The Eighth Crusade was launched by Louis IX of France but largely petered out when Louis died shortly after reaching Tunis.
- 1271 – 1272: The Ninth Crusade failed.
- 1300 – 1521: During the Aztecs' existence in the post-classic period from 1300 to 1521, they practised a religion which encompassed a complex range of practices and beliefs, being generally polytheistic. Human sacrifice was practised on a grand scale throughout the Aztec Empire, which was performed in honour of their gods.
- 1320: Pope John XXII laid the groundwork for future witch-hunts with the formalisation of the persecution of witchcraft.
- 1378 – 1417: The Roman Catholic Church split during the Western Schism.
- 1415: The death of Jan Hus who is considered as the first reformer of the Western Christianity. This event is often considered as the beginning of the Reformation.
- 1469 – 1539: The life of Guru Nanak, founder of Sikhism.
- 1484: Pope Innocent VIII marked the beginning of the classical European witch-hunts with his papal bull Summis desiderantes.
- 1486 – 1534: Chaitanya Mahaprabhu popularised the chanting of the Hare Krishna and composed the Shikshashtakam (eight devotional prayers) in Sanskrit. His followers, Gaudiya Vaishnavas, revere him as a spiritual reformer, a Hindu revivalist and an avatar of Krishna.

== Early modern and Modern eras ==
=== 16th century ===
- 1500: In the Spanish Empire, Catholicism was spread and encouraged through such institutions as the missions and the Inquisition.
- 1517: Martin Luther posted The Ninety-Five Theses on the door of All Saints' Church, Wittenberg, launching the Protestant Reformation.
- 1526: African religious systems were introduced to the Americas, with the commencement of the trans-Atlantic slave trade. Inception of Mughal Dynasty, which was one of the longest ruling in India from 1526-1858. Mughals were Muslims of Central Asian origin, speaking Persian as their court language. The majority of the population under their rule was Hindu, but the Mughals were predominantly Muslim. Except for Akbar and Jahangir, who were religiously tolerant, the Mughal emperors especially Aurangzeb tried imposing their religion on the others.
- 1534: Henry VIII separated the English Church from Rome and made himself Supreme Head of the Church of England.
- 1562: The Massacre of Vassy sparked the first of a series of French Wars of Religion.

=== 17th century ===
- 1674: Chatrapati Shivaji Maharaj became 1st Chatrapati of Maratha Kingdom
- 1699: Guru Gobind Singh Ji created the Khalsa in Sikhism.

=== 18th century ===
- 1708: Guru Gobind Singh, the last Sikh guru, died after instituting the Sikh holy book, the Guru Granth Sahib, as the eternal Guru.
- 1770: Baron d'Holbach published The System of Nature said to be the first positive, unambiguous statement of atheism in the West.
- 1781: Ghanshyam, later known as Sahajanand Swami/Swaminarayan, was born in Chhapaiya at the house of Dharmadev and Bhaktimata.
- 1789 – 1799: in the Dechristianisation of France the Revolutionary Government confiscated Church properties, banned monastic vows and, with the passage of the Civil Constitution of the Clergy, removed control of the Church from the Pope and subordinated it as a department of the Government. The Republic also replaced the traditional Gregorian Calendar and abolished Christian holidays.
- c. 1790 – 1840: The Second Great Awakening, a Protestant religious revival in the United States.
- 1791: Freedom of religion, enshrined in the Bill of Rights, was added as an amendment to the Constitution of the United States, forming an early and influential secular government.
- 1794: the Cult of the Supreme Being in France is founded by Maximilien Robespierre.

=== 19th century ===
- 1801: the French Revolutionary Government and Pope Pius VII entered into the Concordat of 1801. While Roman Catholicism regained some powers and became recognised as "the religion of the great majority of the French", it was not afforded the latitude it had enjoyed prior to the Revolution and was not re-established as the official state religion. The Church relinquished all claims to estate seized after 1790, the clergy was state salaried and was obliged to swear allegiance to the State. Religious freedom was restored.
- 1819 – 1850: The life of Siyyid 'Alí Muḥammad Shírází (Persian: سيد علی ‌محمد شیرازی), better known as the Báb, the founder of Bábism.
- 1817 – 1892: The life of Baháʼu'lláh, founder of the Baháʼí Faith.
- 1823: Joseph Smith claims to receive visions and golden plates to be translated as the Book of Mormon.
- 1830s: Adventism was started by William Miller in the United States.
- 1830: the Church of Christ was founded by Joseph Smith on 6 April – initiating the Latter Day Saint restorationist movement.
- 1835 – 1908: the life of Mirza Ghulam Ahmad, the founder of the Ahmadiyya Movement.
- 1836 – 1886: the life of Ramakrishna, saint and mystic of Bengal.
- 1844: Joseph Smith was murdered, reportedly by John C. Elliott, on 27 June, resulting in a succession crisis in the Latter Day Saint movement.
- 1857: first great popular uprising against British colonial government in India. Also called Indian Rebellion of 1857.
- 1857: In Paris, Hippolyte Léon Denizard Rivail under the pen name of Allan Kardec publishes The Spirits Book, giving start to Kardecist spiritism.
- 1875: the Theosophical Society was formed in New York City by Helena Blavatsky, Henry Steel Olcott, William Quan Judge and others.
- 1879: Christian Science was granted its charter in Boston, Massachusetts.
- 1881: Zion's Watch Tower Tract Society was formed by Charles Taze Russell, initiating the Bible Student movement.
- 1889: the Ahmadiyya Community was established.
- 1893: Swami Vivekananda's first speech at The Parliament of the World's Religions, Chicago, brought the ancient philosophies of Vedanta and Yoga to the western world.
- 1899: Aradia (aka The Gospel of the Witches), one of the earliest books describing post witchhunt European religious Witchcraft, was published by Charles Godfrey Leland.

=== 20th century ===
- 1901: The incorporation of the Spiritualists' National Union legally representing Spiritualism in the United Kingdom.
- 1904: Thelema was founded by Aleister Crowley.
- 1905: In France the law on the Separation of the Churches and the State was passed, officially establishing state secularism and putting an end to the funding of religious groups by the state.
- 1907: Formation of BAPS (Bochasanwasi Shri Akshar Purushottam Swaminarayan Sanstha), a major sect in the Swaminarayan Sampradaya by Shastriji Maharaj
- 1908: The Khalifatul Masih was established in the Ahmadiyya Muslim Community as the "Second Manifestation of God's Power".
- 1913: The Moorish Science Temple of America is founded in Newark, New Jersey.
- 1917: The October Revolution in Russia led to the annexation of all church properties and subsequent religious suppression.
- 1920: The Self-Realization Fellowship Church of all Religions with its headquarters in Los Angeles, CA, was founded by Paramahansa Yogananda.
- 1922 – 1991: Persecution of Christians in the Soviet Union. The total number of Christian victims has been estimated to range around 12 to 20 million.
- 1926: Cao Dai founded.
- 1929: The Cristero War, fought between the secular government and religious Christian rebels in Mexico, ended.
- 1930: The Rastafari movement began following the coronation of Haile Selassie I as Emperor of Ethiopia.
- 1930: After previously failing to claim the leadership of the Moorish Science Temple of America, Wallace Fard Muhammad creates the Nation of Islam in Detroit, Michigan.
- 1931: Jehovah's Witnesses emerged from the Bible Student movement under the influence of Joseph Franklin Rutherford.
- 1932: A neo-Hindu religious movement, the Brahma Kumaris or "Daughters of Brahma", started. Its origin can be traced to the group "Om Mandali", founded by Lekhraj Kripalani (1884–1969).
- 1939 – 1945: Millions of Jews were relocated and murdered by the Nazis during the Holocaust.
- 1947: Pakistan, the first nation-state in the name of Islam was created. British India was partitioned into the secular nation of India with a Hindu majority and the Muslim-majority nation of Pakistan (the eastern half of whom would later become Bangladesh).
- 1948: The Nakba saw the mass expulsion and ethnic cleansing of Palestinians, upon which the Jewish state of Israel was established.
- 1954: The Church of Scientology was founded by L. Ron Hubbard.
- 1954: Wicca was publicised by Gerald Gardner.
- 1955: The Urantia Book was published by the Urantia Foundation.
- 1956: Navayana Buddhism (Neo-Buddhism) was founded by B. R. Ambedkar, initially attracting some 380,000 Dalit converts from Hinduism.
- 1959: The 14th Dalai Lama fled Tibet amidst unrest and established an exile community in India.
- 1960s: Various Neopagan and New Age movements gained momentum.
- 1961: Unitarian Universalism was formed from the merger of Unitarianism and Universalism.
- 1962: The Church of All Worlds, the first American neo-pagan church, was formed by a group including Oberon Zell-Ravenheart, Morning Glory Zell-Ravenheart, and Richard Lance Christie.
- 1962 – 1965: The Second Vatican Council was convened.
- 1965: Srila Prabhupada established the International Society for Krishna Consciousness and introduced translations of the Bhagavad-Gita and Vedic scriptures in mass production all over the world.
- 1966: The Church of Satan was founded by Anton LaVey on Walpurgisnacht.
- 1972 – 1984: The Stonehenge free festivals started.
- 1972 – 2004: Germanic Neopaganism (aka Heathenism, Heathenry, Ásatrú, Odinism, Forn Siðr, Vor Siðr, and Theodism) began to experience a second wave of revival.
- 1973: Claude Vorilhon established the Raëlian Movement and changed his name to Raël following a purported extraterrestrial encounter in December 1973.
- 1975: The Temple of Set was founded in Santa Barbara, California.
- 1979: The Iranian Revolution resulted in the establishment of an Islamic Republic in Iran.
- 1981: The Stregherian revival continued. "The Book of the Holy Strega" and "The Book of Ways", Volumes I and II, were published.
- 1984: Operation Blue Star in the holiest site of the Sikhs, the Golden Temple in Amritsar, led to Anti-Sikh riots in Delhi and adjoining regions, following the assassination of Prime Minister Indira Gandhi.
- 1985: The Battle of the Beanfield forced an end to the Stonehenge free festivals.
- 1989: Following the revolutions of 1989, the overthrow of many Soviet-style states allowed a resurgence in open religious practice in many Eastern European countries.
- 1990s: Reconstructionist Pagan movements (Celtic, Hellenic, Roman, Slavic, Baltic, Finnish, etc.) proliferate throughout Europe.
- 1993: The European Council convened in Copenhagen, Denmark, agreed to the Copenhagen Criteria, requiring religious freedom within all members and prospective members of the European Union.
- 1993: The World Union of Deists is founded in the United States.
- 1995: First Traditional Hindu Mandir outside of India created in London by Pramukh Swami Maharaj (1921–2016) Guru of BAPS.
- 1998: The Strega Arician Tradition was founded.

=== 21st century ===
- 2002: Joy of Satan Ministries was founded by Andrea Dietrich following her conception of the ideology of "spiritual Satanism".
- 2005: Becoming a place of pilgrimage for neo-druids and other pagans, the Ancient Order of Druids organised the first recorded reconstructionist ceremony in Stonehenge in 2005.
- 2006: Sectarian rivalries exploded in Iraq between Sunni Muslims and Shias, with each side targeting the other in terrorist acts, and bombings of mosques and shrines.
- 2008: Nepal, the world's only Hindu Kingdom, was declared a secular state by its Constituent Assembly after declaring the state a Republic on 28 May 2008.
- 2009: The Church of Scientology in France was fined €600,000 and several of its leaders were fined and imprisoned for defrauding new recruits of their savings. The state failed to disband the church owing to legal changes occurring over the same time period.
- 2011: Civil war broke out in Syria over domestic political issues. The country soon split along sectarian lines between Sunni Muslims, Alawite and Shiites. War crimes and acts of genocide were committed by both parties as religious leaders on each side condemned the other as heretics. The Syrian civil war soon became a battleground for regional sectarian unrest, as fighters joined the fight from as far away as North America and Europe, as well as Iran and the Arab states.
- 2012: The Satanic Temple was founded by Lucien Greaves and Malcolm Jarry (pseudonyms).
- 2014: A supposed Islamic Caliphate was established by the self-proclaimed Islamic State in regions of war torn Syria and Iraq, drawing global support from radical Sunni Muslims. This was a modern-day attempt to re-establish Islamic self-rule in accordance with strict adherence to Shariah-Islamic religious law. In the wake of the Syrian civil war, Islamic extremists targeted the indigenous Arab Christian communities. In acts of genocide, numerous ancient Christian and Yazidi communities were evicted and threatened with death by various Muslim Sunni fighter groups. After ISIS terrorist forces infiltrated and took over large parts of northern Iraq from Syria, many ancient Christian and Yazidi enclaves were destroyed.
- 2019: The Orthodox Church of Ukraine is granted independence from the Russian Orthodox Church by the Ecumenical Patriarchate of Constantinople.

== See also ==
- Axial Age
- Chibanian
- Evolutionary origin of religion
- History of religion
- Holocene calendar
- Late Pleistocene
- Paleolithic religion
- Prehistoric religion
- Religion and mythology

== Bibliography ==
- Smith, Laura (2007), Illustrated Timeline of Religion, Sterling Publishing Company, ISBN 978-1-4027-3606-3
- Bowker, John (2006), World Religions, DK Pub., ISBN 0-7566-1772-3
- Sangave, Dr. Vilas Adinath (2001), Facets of Jainology: Selected Research Papers on Jain Society, Religion, and Culture, Mumbai: Popular Prakashan, ISBN 978-81-7154-839-2
- Glasenapp, Helmuth Von (1999), Jainism, Motilal Banarsidass, ISBN 978-81-208-1376-2
- Fisher, Mary Pat (1997), Living Religions: An Encyclopedia of the World's Faiths, London: I.B.Tauris, ISBN 1-86064-148-2
- Deo, Shantaram Bhalchandra (1956), History of Jaina monachism from inscriptions and literature, Pune: Deccan College Post-graduate and Research Institute
- Zimmer, Heinrich (1952), Joseph Campbell (ed.), Philosophy of India, London: Routledge & Kegan Paul Ltd, "Not in copyright"
