= Stranger in a Strange Land =

1961 science fiction novel by Robert A. Heinlein

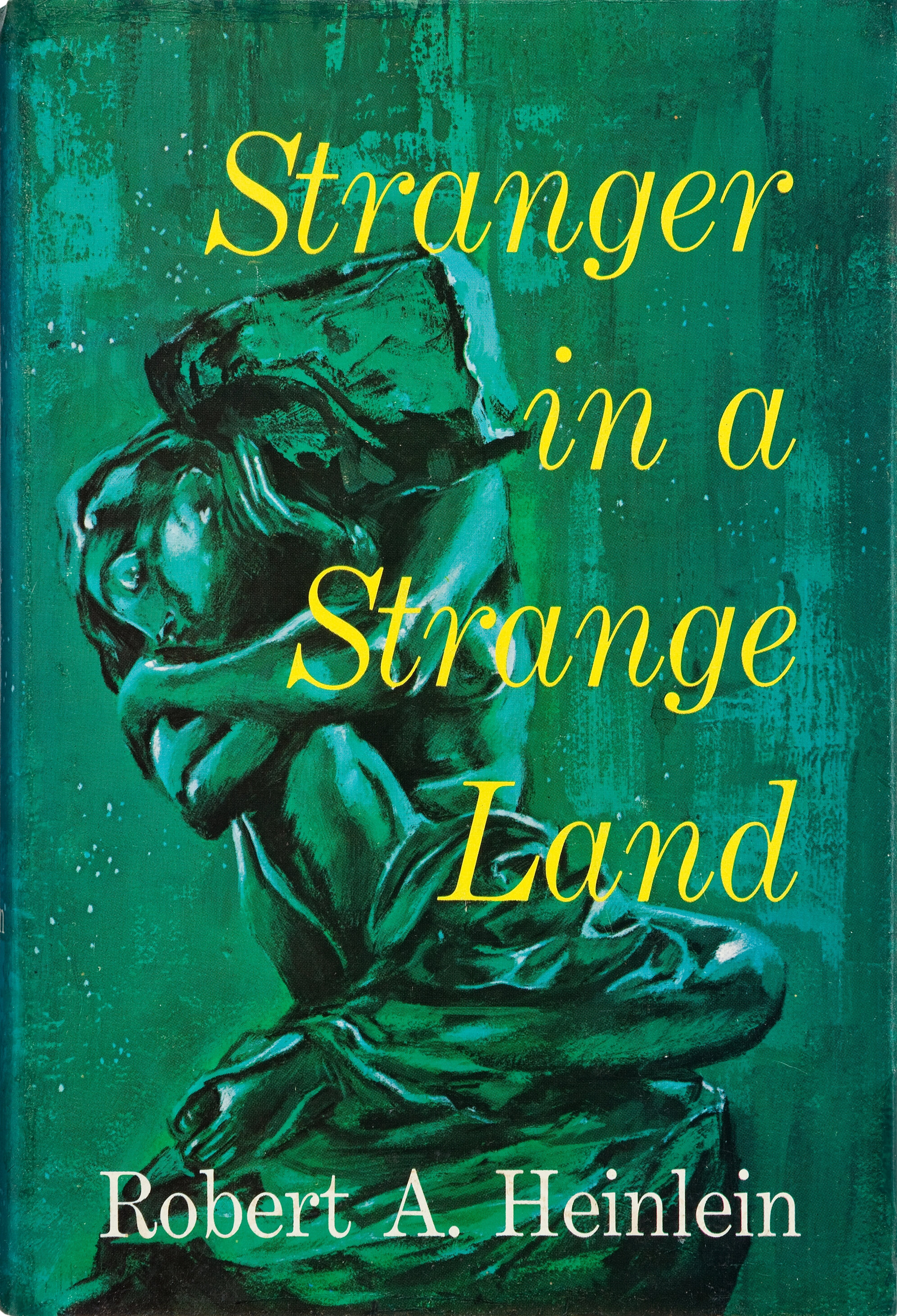
- Hardcover, showing Rodin's sculpture Fallen Caryatid Carrying her Stone
- Author: Robert A. Heinlein
- Language: English
- Genre: Science fiction
- Publisher: G. P. Putnam's Sons
- Publication date: June 1, 1961
- Publication place: United States
- Media type: Print (hardcover and paperback)
- Pages: 408 (208,018 words)
- Awards: Hugo Award for Best Novel (1962); Prometheus Hall of Fame Award (1987)
- ISBN: 978-0-441-79034-0

Stranger in a Strange Land is a 1961 science fiction novel by the American author Robert A. Heinlein. It tells the story of Valentine Michael Smith, a human who comes to Earth in early adulthood after being born on the planet Mars and raised by Martians, and explores his interaction with and eventual transformation of Terran culture.

The title "Stranger in a Strange Land" is a direct quotation from the King James Bible (taken from Exodus 2:22). The working title for the book was "A Martian Named Smith", which was also the name of the screenplay started by a character at the end of the novel.

Heinlein's widow Virginia arranged to have the original unedited manuscript published in 1991, three years after Heinlein's death. Critics disagree about which version is superior.

Stranger in a Strange Land won the 1962 Hugo Award for Best Novel and became the first science fiction novel to enter The New York Times Book Review's best-seller list. In 2012, the Library of Congress named it one of the "Books that Shaped America".

== Plot ==
The flag of Mars as described in the novel

Prior to World War III, the crewed spacecraft Envoy is launched toward Mars, but all contact is lost shortly before landing. Twenty-five years later, the spacecraft Champion makes contact with the inhabitants of Mars and finds a single survivor, Valentine Michael Smith. Born on the Envoy, he was raised entirely by the Martians. He is ordered by them to accompany the returning expedition.

Smith is confined at Bethesda Hospital, where, having never seen a human female, he is attended by male staff only. Seeing that restriction as a challenge, Nurse Gillian Boardman eludes the guards and goes in to see Smith. By sharing a glass of water with him, she inadvertently becomes his first "water brother", a profound relationship by Martian standards, as water on Mars is extremely scarce.

Gillian's lover, reporter Ben Caxton, discovers that Smith is extremely wealthy. Ben is seized by the government, and Gillian persuades Smith to leave the hospital with her. Gillian takes Smith to Jubal Harshaw, a famous author, physician and lawyer. Eventually, Harshaw arranges freedom for Smith and recognition that human law, which would have granted ownership of Mars to Smith, has no applicability to a planet that is already inhabited by intelligent life.

Smith becomes a celebrity and is feted by the Earth's elite. He investigates many religions, including the Fosterite Church of the New Revelation, a populist megachurch in which sexuality, gambling, alcohol consumption, and similar activities are allowed and even encouraged and considered "sinning" only when they are not under church auspices. Smith has a brief career as a magician in a carnival, in which he and Gillian befriend the show's tattooed lady.

Smith starts a Martian-influenced "Church of All Worlds", combining elements of the Fosterite cult with Western esotericism. The church is besieged by Fosterites for practicing "blasphemy", and the church building is destroyed, but unknown to the public, Smith's followers teleport to safety.

Smith is arrested by the police but escapes and returns to his followers, later explaining to Jubal that his gigantic fortune has been bequeathed to the church. With that wealth and their new abilities, church members will be able to reorganize human societies and cultures.

Smith is killed by a mob raised against him by the Fosterites. Jubal and some of the church members return to Jubal's home to regroup and prepare to found new Church of All Worlds congregations. Smith reappears in the afterlife to replace the Fosterites' founder, amid hints that Smith was an incarnation of the Archangel Michael.

== Characters ==
Heinlein named his main character "Smith" because of a speech he made at a science fiction convention regarding the unpronounceable names assigned to extraterrestrials. After describing the importance of establishing a dramatic difference between humans and aliens, Heinlein concluded, "Besides, whoever heard of a Martian named Smith?" The title Stranger in a Strange Land is taken from the King James Version of Exodus 2:22, "And she bore him a son, and he called his name Gershom: for he said, I have been a stranger in a strange land".

In the preface to the uncut, original version of the book reissued in 1991, Heinlein's widow, Virginia, wrote: "The given names of the chief characters have great importance to the plot. They were carefully selected: Jubal means 'the father of all,' Michael stands for 'Who is like God?'".

Valentine Michael Smith
Known as Michael Smith or "Mike", the "Man from Mars" is born on Mars in the interval between the landing of the Envoy and the arrival of the Champion. He is 20 years old when the Champion arrives and brings him to Earth.
Gillian (Jill) Boardman
A nurse at Bethesda Hospital who sneaks Mike out of government custody. She plays a key role in introducing him to human culture and becomes one of his closest confidantes and a central figure in the Church of All Worlds, which Mike develops.
Ben Caxton
An early love interest of Jill and an investigative journalist (Jill sees him as of the "lippmann", political, rather than the "winchell", or celebrity gossip inclination), who masterminds Mike's initial freedom from custody. He joins Mike's inner circle but remains somewhat skeptical at first of the social order that it develops.
Jubal Harshaw
A popular writer, lawyer, and doctor, now semi-retired to a house in the Pocono Mountains, an influential but reclusive public figure who provides pivotal support for Mike's independence and a safe haven for him. Elderly but in good health, he serves as a father figure for the inner circle while keeping a suspicious distance from it. The character's name was chosen by Heinlein to have unusual overtones, like Jonathan Hoag. Mike enshrines him (much to Harshaw's initial chagrin) as the patron saint of the church he founds.
Anne, Miriam, Dorcas
Harshaw's three personal/professional secretaries, who live with him and take turns as his "front", responding to his instructions. Anne is certified as a Fair Witness, empowered to provide objective legal testimony about events that she witnesses. All three become early acolytes of Michael's church.
Duke, Larry
Handymen who work for Harshaw and live on his estate; they also become central members of the church.
Dr. "Stinky" Mahmoud
A semanticist, crew member of the Champion and the second human (after Mike) to gain a working knowledge of the Martian language but does not "grok" the language. He becomes a member of the church while retaining his Muslim faith.
Patty Paiwonski
A "tattooed lady" and snake handler at the carnival Mike and Jill join for a time. She has ties to the Fosterite church, which she retains as a member of Mike's inner circle.
Joseph Douglas
Secretary-General of the Federation of Free States, which has evolved indirectly from the United Nations into a true world government.
Alice Douglas
Sometimes called "Agnes", Joe Douglas' wife. As the First Lady, she manipulates her husband, making major economic, political, and staffing decisions and frequently consults astrologer Becky Vesant for major decisions.
Foster
The founder of the Church of the New Revelation (Fosterite), who now exists as an archangel.
Digby
Foster's successor as head of the Fosterite Church; he becomes an archangel under Foster after Mike "discorporates" him.

== Development ==
Originally titled The Heretic, the book was written in part as a deliberate attempt to challenge social norms. In the course of the story, Heinlein uses Smith's open-mindedness to re-evaluate such institutions as religion, money, monogamy, and the fear of death. Heinlein completed writing it ten years after he had plotted it out in detail. He later wrote, "I had been in no hurry to finish it, as that story could not be published commercially until the public mores changed. I could see them changing and it turned out that I had timed it right."

Heinlein got the idea for the novel when he and his wife Virginia were brainstorming one evening in 1948. She suggested a new version of Rudyard Kipling's The Jungle Book (1894), but with a child raised by Martians instead of wolves. He decided to go further with the idea and worked on the story on and off for more than a decade, believing that contemporary society was not yet ready for it.

Heinlein was surprised that some readers thought the book described how he believed society should be organized, explaining: "I was not giving answers. I was trying to shake the reader loose from some preconceptions and induce him to think for himself, along new and fresh lines. In consequence, each reader gets something different out of that book because he himself supplies the answers ... It is an invitation to think – not to believe."

His editors at Putnam required him to cut its 220,000-word length down to 160,000 words before publication.

Heinlein himself remarked in a letter he wrote to Oberon Zell-Ravenheart in 1972 that he thought his shorter, edited version was better. Heinlein also added some new material to the shorter version.

The book was dedicated in part to science fiction author Philip José Farmer, who had explored sexual themes in works such as The Lovers (1952). It was also influenced by the satiric fantasies of James Branch Cabell.

== Reception ==
Heinlein's deliberately provocative book generated considerable controversy. The free love and commune living aspects of the Church of All Worlds led to the book's exclusion from school reading lists. It was rumored to be associated with Charles Manson.

Writing in The New York Times, Orville Prescott received the novel caustically, describing it as a "disastrous mishmash of science fiction, laborious humor, dreary social satire, and cheap eroticism"; he characterized Stranger in a Strange Land as "puerile and ludicrous", saying "when a non-stop orgy is combined with a lot of preposterous chatter, it becomes unendurable, an affront to the patience and intelligence of readers". Galaxy reviewer Floyd C. Gale rated the novel 3.5 stars out of five, saying "the book's shortcomings lie not so much in its emancipation as in the fact that Heinlein has bitten off too large a chewing portion".

Despite such reviews, Stranger in a Strange Land won the 1962 Hugo Award for Best Novel and became the first science fiction novel to enter The New York Times Book Review's best-seller list. In 2012, it was included in a Library of Congress exhibition of "Books That Shaped America".

American journalist and editor Annalee Newitz described Stranger in a Strange Land as "the sexist model of hippie life. We're all liberated, but the women still get the coffee."

Critics have also suggested that Jubal Harshaw is actually a stand-in for Robert Heinlein himself, based on similarities in career choice and general disposition, though Harshaw is much older than Heinlein was at the time of writing. Literary critic Dan Schneider wrote that Harshaw's belief in his own free will, was one "which Mike, Jill, and the Fosterites misinterpret as a pandeistic urge, 'Thou art God!'"

== Influence ==
The book significantly influenced modern culture in a variety of ways.

=== Church of All Worlds ===
A central element of the second half of the novel is the religious movement founded by Smith, the "Church of All Worlds", an initiatory mystery religion blending elements of paganism and revivalism, with psychic training and instruction in the Martian language. In 1968, Oberon Zell-Ravenheart (then Tim Zell) founded the Church of All Worlds, a Neopagan religious organization modeled in many ways after the fictional organization in the novel. The spiritual path included several ideas from the book, including polyamory, non-mainstream family structures, social libertarianism, water-sharing rituals, an acceptance of all religious paths by a single tradition, and the use of several terms such as "grok", "Thou art God", and "Never Thirst".

Heinlein objected to Zell's lumping him with other writers such as Ayn Rand and Robert Rimmer; Heinlein felt that those writers used their art for propaganda purposes, while he simply asked questions of the reader, expecting each reader to answer for him- or herself. He wrote to Zell in a letter: "... each reader gets something different out of the book because he himself supplies the answers. If I managed to shake him loose from some prejudice, preconception or unexamined assumption, that was all I intended to do."

Though Heinlein was neither a member nor a promoter of the Church, it was formed including frequent correspondence between Zell and Heinlein, and Heinlein was a paid subscriber to the Church's magazine Green Egg. This Church still exists as a 501(c)(3) recognized religious organization incorporated in California, with membership worldwide, and it remains an active part of the neopagan community. The book was also a major ideological influence on the 1970s neo-Nazi Satanist organization the Order of the Black Ram.

=== Grok ===
The word grok was coined by Heinlein in the novel as part of the Martian language. It literally means "to drink" (reflecting the scarcity and sacredness of water on Mars) but carries a much deeper figurative meaning: to understand something so thoroughly and intuitively that the observer becomes one with the observed—to merge with it emphatically, "drink it in" completely. This encompasses comprehension, love, and profound unity beyond mere intellectual grasp.

The term entered popular use among science fiction fans in the 1960s and then spread to counterculture and hippie communities and later to computer programmers, hackers, and the tech industry (notably referenced in the Jargon File). It was added to the Oxford English Dictionary and remains a recognized neologism.

In 2023, xAI named its generative AI chatbot Grok, after the term, with the company citing the novel's emphasis on deep, intuitive understanding and modeling its personality and helpfulness after the spirit of Douglas Adams's The Hitchhiker's Guide to the Galaxy.

=== Fair Witness ===
The profession of Fair Witness, invented for the novel, has been cited in such varied contexts as environmentalism, psychology, technology, digital signatures, and science, as well as in books on leadership and Sufism. A Fair Witness is an individual trained to observe events and report exactly what is seen and heard, making no extrapolations or assumptions. While wearing the Fair Witness uniform of a white robe, they are presumed to be observing and opining in their professional capacity. Works that refer to the Fair Witness emphasize the profession's impartiality, integrity, objectivity, and reliability.

An example from the book illustrates the role when Anne, a Fair Witness, is asked what color a house is. She answers, "It's white on this side." The character Jubal then explains, "You see? It doesn't occur to Anne to infer that the other side is white, too. All the King's horses couldn't force her to commit herself... unless she went there and looked – and even then she wouldn't assume that it stayed white after she left."

=== Waterbed ===
Stranger in a Strange Land contains an early description of the waterbed. An inventor who attempted to patent the waterbed was initially refused on the grounds that Heinlein's description in Stranger in a Strange Land constituted prior art.

== Publication history ==
Two major versions of this book exist:

- The 1961 version which, at the publisher's request, Heinlein cut by 25% in length. Approximately 60,000 words were removed from the original manuscript, including some sharp criticism of American attitudes toward sex and religion. The book was marketed to a mainstream readership, and was the first science fiction novel to be listed on The New York Times Best Seller list for fiction. By 1997, over 100,000 copies of the hardback edition had been sold along with nearly five million copies of the paperback. None of his later novels would match this level of success.
- The 1991 version, retrieved from Heinlein's archives in the University of California, Santa Cruz, Special Collections Department by Heinlein's widow, Virginia, and published posthumously, which reproduces the original manuscript and restores all cuts. It came about because in 1989, Virginia renewed the copyright to Stranger and cancelled the existing publication contracts in accordance with the Copyright Act of 1976. Both Heinlein's agent and his publisher (which had new senior editors) agreed that the uncut version was better: readers are used to longer books, and what was seen as objectionable in 1961 was no longer so 30 years later.

Heinlein himself remarked in a letter he wrote to Oberon Zell-Ravenheart in 1972 that he thought his shorter, edited version was better. He wrote, "SISL was never censored by anyone in any fashion. The first draft was nearly twice as long as the published version. I cut it myself to bring it down to a commercial length. But I did not leave out anything of any importance; I simply trimmed all possible excess verbiage. Perhaps you have noticed that it reads 'fast' despite its length; that is why. ... The original, longest version of SISL ... is really not worth your trouble, as it is the same story throughout – simply not as well told. With it is the brushpenned version which shows exactly what was cut out – nothing worth reading, that is. I learned to write for pulp magazines, in which one was paid by the yard rather than by the package; it was not until I started writing for the Saturday Evening Post that I learned the virtue of brevity."

Additionally, since Heinlein added material while he was editing the manuscript for the commercial release, the 1991 publication of the original manuscript is missing some material that was in the novel when it was first published.

=== Editions ===
Many editions exist:

- June 1, 1961, Putnam Publishing Group, hardcover, ISBN 0-399-10772-X
- Avon, NY, first paperback edition, 1962.
- 1965, New English Library Ltd, (London).
- March 1968, Berkley Medallion, paperback, ISBN 0-425-04688-5
- July 1970, New English Library Ltd, (London). 400 pages, paperback. (third 'new edition', August 1971 reprint, NEL 2844.)
- 1972, Capricorn Books, 408 pages, ISBN 0-399-50268-8
- October 1975, Berkley Publishing Group, paperback, ISBN 0-425-03067-9
- November 1977, Berkley Publishing Group, paperback, ISBN 0-425-03782-7
- July 1979, Berkley Publishing Group, paperback, ISBN 0-425-04377-0
- September 1980, Berkley Publishing Group, paperback, ISBN 0-425-04688-5
- July 1982, Berkley Publishing Group, paperback, ISBN 0-425-05833-6
- July 1983, Penguin Putnam, paperback, ISBN 0-425-06490-5
- January 1984, Berkley Publishing Group, paperback, ISBN 0-425-07142-1
- May 1, 1984, Berkley Publishing Group, paperback, ISBN 0-425-05216-8
- December 1984, Berkley Publishing Group, ISBN 0-425-08094-3
- November 1986, Berkley Publishing Group, paperback, ISBN 0-425-10147-9
- 1989, Easton Press, leather bound hardcover, 414 pages
- January 1991, original uncut edition, Ace/Putnam, hardcover, ISBN 0-399-13586-3
- May 3, 1992, original uncut edition, Hodder and Stoughton, mass market paperback, 655 pages, ISBN 0-450-54742-6
- 1995, Easton Press (MBI, Inc.), original uncut edition, leather bound hardcover, 525 pages
- August 1, 1995, ACE Charter, paperback, 438 pages, ISBN 0-441-79034-8
- April 1, 1996, Blackstone Audio, cassette audiobook, ISBN 0-7861-0952-1
- October 1, 1999, Sagebrush, library binding, ISBN 0-8085-2087-3
- June 1, 2002, Blackstone Audio, cassette audiobook, ISBN 0-7861-2229-3
- January 2003, Turtleback Books distributed by Demco Media, hardcover, ISBN 0-606-25126-X
- November 1, 2003, Blackstone Audio, CD audiobook, ISBN 0-7861-8848-0
- March 14, 2005, Hodder and Stoughton, paperback, 655 pages, ISBN 0-340-83795-0
- October 25, 2016, Penguin Books, hardcover, 498 pages, ISBN 978-0143111627
- 2020, Folio Society, original uncut edition, slipcased hardcover, 616 pages
- 2021, Suntup Press, original uncut edition, slipcased hardcover, 636 pages, ISBN 1-951-15169-0
