= Grey School of Wizardry =

- The seal for The Grey School of Wizardry
- Whitehall, New York; United States

Information
- Motto: Latin: Omnia vivunt, omnia inter se conexa (Everything is alive; everything is interconnected)
- Established: 2004
- Headmaster: Nicholas Kingsley
- Faculty: 18
- Age: 11+
- Houses: Flames; Waters; Stones; Winds; Psyche
- Newspaper: Grey Matters
- Website: www.greyschool.net

The Grey School of Wizardry is an online school with a focus on secular esoteric education. Founded by former headmaster Oberon Zell-Ravenheart, it operates primarily online and as a non-profit educational institution in California. The school offers lessons in over 500 classes across 16 departments. Graduates receive a certificate of journeymanship in their chosen major after completing an apprenticeship.

== History ==
The program was partially inspired by the fictitious Hogwarts School of Witchcraft and Wizardry from the Harry Potter novels by J. K. Rowling. Before the school opened, the Grey Council was established by Oberon Zell-Ravenheart as an advisory group to determine the curriculum. The Grey Council was composed of some two dozen authors, mystics, magicians and leaders of neopagan communities around the world, including Raymond Buckland, Raven Grimassi, Patricia Telesco, Frederic Lamond, Morning Glory Zell-Ravenheart, Donald Michael Kraig, Katlyn Breene, Robert Lee "Skip" Ellison, Jesse Wolf Hardin, Nicki Scully, Sam Webster, Trina Robbins, Ronald Hutton, Amber K, Ellen Evert Hopman, Luc Sala and Jeff McBride. The Grey Council worked through 2003 to produce a textbook—a grimoire—for the school, the Grimoire for the Apprentice Wizard (2004). This was followed by the Companion for the Apprentice Wizard in 2006.

The Grey School of Wizardry first opened on August 1, 2004. The school's motto is: Omnia vivunt, omnia inter se conexa (“Everything is alive; everything is interconnected” — Cicero). It is a nonprofit educational institute for children 11–17 years of age, and adults of any age. The name of the school may derive from the colors associated with the wizards in the J. R. R. Tolkien classic The Lord of the Rings and, in particular, with the appendix to the name of the protagonist Gandalf (the Grey). It was incorporated as a non-profit educational institution in California on March 14, 2004, and received a 501(c)(3) tax exemption from the Internal Revenue Service on September 27, 2007.

== Curriculum ==
The school provides a seven-year apprenticeship curriculum in wizardry. More than 500 classes are offered in 16 color-coded departments. These are: Wizardry (indigo), Natural Philosophy (silver), Magickal Practice (gold), Psychic Arts (aqua), Healing (blue), Wortcunning/Herbalism (green), Divination (yellow), Performance Magics (orange), Alchemy & Magickal Sciences (red), Lifeways (pink), Beast Mastery (brown), Cosmology (violet), Mathemagicks (clear), Ceremonial Magic (white), Lore (grey), and Dark Arts (black). Although some classes address mythology and comparative religion, the school's grimoire (textbook of magic), Companion for the Apprentice Wizard, and the school's philosophy focus on secular exploration of the esoteric rather than spirituality.

The curriculum is categorized as follows:

- Foundational Courses: These courses are mandatory for all apprentices, providing an introduction to essential concepts in wizardry and forming the base for subsequent specialized studies.
- Specialized Departments: The curriculum is further divided into 16 departments, each identified by a distinct color. Departments cover a wide spectrum of subjects, ranging from Nature Studies and Healing to Alchemy & Magickal Sciences and Dark Arts. This division facilitates both specialization in areas of interest and a comprehensive education.
- Practical Applications: Beyond theoretical instruction, the curriculum places a strong emphasis on practical exercises, allowing students to implement their knowledge in practical contexts.
- Interdisciplinary Studies: The school acknowledges the interrelation of esoteric disciplines. Consequently, there's a cross-disciplinary approach in the curriculum, offering students an integrated perspective and in-depth comprehension.
- Guest Lectures and Workshops: Renowned experts from various esoteric domains are periodically invited to share their knowledge, providing students with diverse viewpoints and updates on current practices and innovations.
- Research and Exploration: Senior students have the opportunity to engage in independent research projects, deepening their expertise and contributing to the wider esoteric discourse.
- Ethical Considerations: In recognition of the profound impact of certain esoteric practices, the curriculum incorporates lessons on ethics, emphasizing the responsibilities associated with the application of such knowledge.

The curriculum at the Grey School of Wizardry undergoes regular updates to remain aligned with current advancements in the field and to incorporate feedback from the academic community, ensuring its relevance in contemporary esoteric education.

The school offers a full apprenticeship program where, upon completion, apprentices receive a certificate of journeymanship in their chosen major. Course materials and exercises are provided by qualified faculty and guest lecturers. The Grey School's Magister Program removes the structure and level restrictions of the Apprenticeship program, allowing the student to choose nearly any class from any level of study in the school's course catalogue.

In October 2019, the Grey School acquired a physical campus in Whitehall, New York. The "Nine Acre Woods" Conclave Grounds and the "Highspire" Manor building are open to Apprentices and Magisters for physical classes and during the school's yearly conclaves. Special access by appointment can be given by the provost.

According to neopagan author Isaac Bonewits the school presents an opportunity for males who are unsatisfied by the teachings of the modern Wicca movement. He also wrote:

The Grimoire collects in one book a library of wisdom about ceremonial native and Earth-centered magic, Paleo- and Neopagan religions, the obligations of the wise to protect the defenseless, great wizards and witches of the past and present, and more.

== Community ==
The Grey School of Wizardry, based in Whitehall, has received attention and acknowledgment from local authorities. Julie Eagan, the Mayor of Whitehall, during a discussion with the school's internal publication, Grey Matters, conveyed her endorsement and anticipation for the establishment. She stated, "Whitehall welcomes the Grey School of Wizardry and any apprentices who opt to visit Whitehall."

Eagan emphasized the school's dedication to community involvement and civic service, which resonates with Whitehall’s communal values. She observed, "Whitehall centers on community and mutual support." The mayor suggested that the school, with its unique focus on training students to be active contributors to their communities, complements the spirit of Whitehall, offering both parties avenues for interaction and collaboration.

Moreover, Eagan highlighted the potential economic and social impact the school could have on Whitehall. She remarked on the significance of the school’s presence, implying that while new businesses are always welcome, a distinctive educational establishment like the Grey School can significantly elevate Whitehall's profile. She expressed hope, indicating that the school’s integration into Whitehall signifies promising prospects for the community's future.
