= Jesse Wolf Hardin =

American writer

Jesse Wolf Hardin (born 1954), is an American writer and founder of the Animá nature-informed teachings and practice, as well as an artist, poet, musician, historian and wilderness restorationist. He is the author of over 500 published articles and 9 books in fields such as personal growth, natural history, deep ecology, spirituality and nature, alternative healing, poetry, wildcrafting, American history and the legends of the Wild West. He lives and teaches at the Animá Sanctuary, located in the mountainous wild-lands of Southwest New Mexico.

Jesse Wolf Hardin is also the co-founder of a large annual herbal gathering called the Good Medicine Confluence, formerly known as Traditions in Western Herbalism Conference.

== Writing career ==
Hardin is the author of 9 books and over 500 published magazine articles. He began his writing career as a young runaway from military school in the 1960s, publishing short pieces and poems in alternative periodicals including Win, The Guardian and Communities. For the first 30 years, he wrote about wild nature and personal growth, responsibility and activism in self-help, and alternative spirituality. His work has been featured in ecology oriented publications such as Mother Earth News, The Trumpeter, Green Egg, Sowell Review, Sentient Times, Creations, New Thought Journal, Hight Country News, Magical Blend and Natural Beauty & Health. His coining of the word "ReWilding" – and writings on personal as well as ecological rewilding – are considered seminal to the budding Neoprimitivist and Wildcrafting communities. The word ReWilding was first coined by Animá teacher and author Jesse Wolf Hardin under the pen name Lone Wolf Circles in 1986, and was meant to refer to personal rewilding (primal awareness, meeting one's needs, acting not out of obedience but personal responsibility) as well as wilderness restoration. It first saw print in his article by that name in July 1988, in the premier issue of a zine published by an insurgent group of disgruntled Earth First! activists, and again in 1996 in the May/June and July/August issues of Oberon Zell-Ravenheart's nationally distributed Green Egg Magazine. Both of Hardin's published references appear to predate use of the word "Rewilding" by both conservationists (such as Dave Foreman and his Rewilding Institute) and anarchist groups. (See also ReWilding entry in The Encyclopedia of Religion of Nature, published by Thoemmes Continuum in 2005.) As his understandings evolved, he began expanding his efforts to reach a wider audience, from literary works for the more conservative readers of Gray's Sporting Journal, to academic and practitioner entries for the definitive Encyclopedia of Nature & Religion.

Hardin's work forms a body of nature-informed insights and lessons that can be utilized by people of any religious or philosophical persuasion to deepen, enliven, enrich and empower their lives. His work has been praised by a number of writers and thinkers from Edward Abbey to Terry Tempest Williams, Roderick Nash, Jerry Mander, Joanna Macy, Oberon Zell-Ravenheart, Gary Snyder and Ralph Metzner. Edward Abbey, a friend and supporter of Hardin's until his death, mentions him in his novel Hayduke Lives!. Terry Tempest Williams writes that in 2000, Hardin founded the Animá teachings (www.animacenter.org), a self-described "empowering set of nature based insights and practices" detailed in his self-published books The Way of Anima and Home: Reinhabiting Self, Recovering Sense Of Place. Most recently he has authored detailed lesson materials for the Animá Shaman Path and Medicine Woman Correspondence Courses, and an illustrated children's book I'm A Medicine Woman, Too!.

== Bibliography ==
- 1991 - Full Circle: A Song of Ecology & Earthen Spirituality (Llewellyn) ISBN 0-87542-347-7
- 2001 - Kindred Spirits: Sacred Earth Wisdom (SwanRaven 2001) ISBN 1-893183-06-8
- 2004 - Gaia Eros: Reconnecting to the Magic and Spirit of Nature (New Page Books) ISBN 1-56414-729-0
- 2006 - Old Guns and Whispering Ghosts, Shoot Magazine Corporation, ISBN 0-9726383-2-6

Self-Published

- The Canyon Testament
- Home: Reinhabiting Self, Recovering Sense of Place
- Kokopelli Seed: A Novel of Magic, Earthen Insight, and Gaian Awakening
- Home: Reinhabiting Self, Recovering Sense Of Place
- The Medicine Bear (historical novel, www.animacenter.org)
- The Way of Animá (available from www.animacenter.org)

Old West Legends

- "Ben Lilly: Bears, Blades & Contradictions"
- "John Wesley Hardin & The Shootist Archetype"
- "Elfego Baca & The Frisco War"

Collections/contributions

- 1996 - The Soul Unearthed - Cass Adams (Tarcher/Putnam) ISBN 0-87477-838-7
- 2002 - The Soul Unearthed - Cass Adams (Sentient Publications) Revised edition ISBN 0-9710786-3-7
- 2004 - Grimoire For The Apprentice Wizard - Oberon Zell-Ravenheart (New Page Books) ISBN 1-56414-711-8
- 2004 - Companion For the Apprentice Wizard - Oberon Zell-Ravenheart (New Page Books) ISBN 1-56414-835-1, ISBN 978-1-56414-835-3
- 2005 - The Encyclopedia Of Nature & Religion - Bron Raymond Taylor (Thoemmes Continuum) ISBN 1-84371-138-9, ISBN 978-1-84371-138-4

== Discography ==
- 1994 - Oikos: Songs for the Living Earth - Music CD
- 2004 - GaiaTribe: The Enchantment - Music CD
- 2005 - Rediscovering Our Own Wildness - Lecture CD & cassette
