= Mandala Vatika =

Sanskrit for circular garden

A mandala vatika (Sanskrit: मण्डलवाटिका, romanized: maṇḍalavāṭikā) is a garden with architecture that is designed per Vedic geometry. The word mandala literally means a circular, symmetrical pattern that is used in Hindu and Buddhist symbolism. The word vatika refers to garden, grove, parterre or plantation, and comes from Sanskrit usage.

In Hinduism, deities are represented and invoked through unique sacred, geometrical patterns inscribed in yantras and mandalas. These are used during worship and meditation, and sanctified with specific rituals and offerings to bring in blessings and auspiciousness.

The ancient texts of India refer to Mandala Vatikas that were dedicated to deities such as Ganesha, Durga, Lakshmi, Shiva, Kartikeya, to planets and even to constellations (Nakshatra Vana), so that individuals could meditate in these groves.

Over the centuries, much of this ancient knowledge from Vedic Scriptures was lost. This was either done to wield power, or protect the sanctity of the knowledge from getting diluted or misused.
