= Ellen Evert Hopman =

American author, herbalist and mental health counselor

Ellen Evert Hopman (born July 31, 1952, in Salzburg, Austria) is an author of both fiction and non-fiction, an herbalist, a lay homeopath, a lecturer, and a mental health counselor who lives and works in Western Massachusetts. She is the author of several books and audio tapes on Paganism and Druidry, and three novels.

Hopman is a certified writing teacher with Amherst Writers and Artists and a multiple recipient of the Golden Oak Award. She was formerly a professor of Wortcunning at the Grey School of Wizardry, where she taught herbalism, Celtic Neopaganism, Celtic history and Celtic lore. She is a professional member of the American Herbalist Guild. and a member of the Grey Council of Mages and Sages. She has taught Druidry and herbalism in the United States, Scotland, Ireland and Canada, and has been a speaker and workshop leader at numerous Neopagan and New Age events, and a subject of articles in The New York Times.

== Education ==
Hopman graduated summa cum laude from Temple University in Philadelphia with a B.S. in Art Education, and received a master's degree in Mental Health Counseling from the University of Massachusetts (Amherst) in 1990. She trained in Herbalism primarily with William LeSassier in New York in 1983, at the Findhorn Foundation in Scotland under Barbara D'Arcy Thompson, and received professional training at the National Center for Homeopathy.

== Career ==
Hopman joined the modern Druidic organization Ar nDraiocht Fein in 1984. She is a co-founder and former co-Chief of The Order of Whiteoak (Ord na Darach Gile), a Celtic Reconstructionist Druid organization. She is also Archdruid Emerita and founder of Tribe of the Oak (Tuatha na Dara), www.tribeoftheoak.org. She held the position of vice president of the Henge of Keltria, an international Druid Fellowship, for nine years. She has been on the staff of Keltria: Journal of Druidism and Celtic Magick and has been a contributing author to many New Age and Pagan journals. She was the founder of The New England Druid Summit, a yearly gathering of Druids in New England. In 2009 she presented a paper on Celtic Cosmology at the International Center for Cultural Studies (ICCS) Conference on Spirituality in Indigenous Cultural and Religious Traditions.

=== Broadcast media ===
Hopman has appeared on several radio and television programs including National Public Radio’s Vox Pop and the Gary Null Show in New York City. She was also featured in a segment of the series Living the Wiccan Life produced by The Witch School. She presented a weekly "herb report" for WRSI radio in Greenfield, MA, and was featured in a documentary about Druids on A&E Television’s The Unexplained (Sacred Societies, February 1999).

=== Books ===
- 1992 – Tree Medicine, Tree Magic. Illustrated by Diana Green. Seattle, WA: Phoenix Publishing. ISBN 0-919345-55-7
- 1994 – A Druid's Herbal for the Sacred Earth Year. Destiny Books. ISBN 0-89281-501-9
- 1995 – People of the Earth: The New Pagans Speak Out (with Lawrence Bond) . Inner Traditions. ISBN 0-89281-559-0
- 2000 – Walking the World in Wonder: A Children's Herbal (with Steven Foster, photographer). Healing Arts Press. ISBN 0-89281-878-6
- 2001 – Being a Pagan: Druids, Wiccans, and Witches Today (with Lawrence Bond). (Revision of People of the Earth: The New Pagans Speak Out) Destiny Books. ISBN 0-89281-904-9
- 2008 – Priestess of the Forest: A Druid Journey. Llewellyn Publications. ISBN 978-0-7387-1262-8
- 2008 – A Druids Herbal of Sacred Tree Medicine. Inner Traditions International. ISBN 978-1-59477-230-6
- 2010 – The Druid Isle. Lewellyn. ISBN 978-0-7387-1956-6
- 2010 – Making Kitchen Medicines – A Practical Guide. Dreamz-Work Productions, LLC ISBN 0982653301
- 2011 – Scottish Herbs and Fairy Lore. Pendraig Publishing ISBN 978-1-936922-01-7
- 2012 – Priestess of the Fire Temple – A Druid's Tale. LLewellyn. ISBN 978-0-7387-2925-1
- 2012 – The Secret Medicine of Your Kitchen. mPowr Publishing, London ISBN 978-1-907282-58-4
- 2016 – A Legacy of Druids – Conversations with Druid leaders of Britain, the USA and Canada, Past and present ISBN 978-1-78535-135-8
- 2016 – Secret Medicines from Your Garden: Plants for Healing, Spirituality, and Magic. Healing Arts Press ISBN 9781620555576
- 2018 – The Real Witches of New England: History, Lore, and Modern Practice. Destiny Books ISBN 9781620557723
- 2018 – Tree Medicine Tree Magic: 2nd Edition. Pendraig Publishing. ISBN 978-1-936922-89-5
- 2019 – The Sacred Herbs of Samhain. Destiny Books ISBN 9781620558614
- 2020 – The Sacred Herbs of Spring. Destiny Books ISBN 9781644110652
- 2022 – Once Around the Sun. Destiny Books ISBN 9781644114148
- 2023 – The Sacred Herbs of Yule and Christmas. Destiny Books ISBN 9781644117804
- 2024 – Celtic Druidry. Destiny Books ISBN 9781644118603

=== Videos ===
- Gifts from the Healing Earth: Volume I. Sawmill River Productions ISBN 1-930477-06-6
- Gifts from the Healing Earth: Volume II. Sawmill River Productions
- Pagans: The Wheel of the Sacred Year. Sawmill River Productions ISBN 1-930477-00-7
- Celtic Cosmology (2009) Sawmill River Productions
