= Jubal Harshaw =

Fictional character in novels by Robert A. Heinlein

Jubal Harshaw is a fictional character featured in several novels by Robert A. Heinlein, most prominently 1961's Stranger in a Strange Land. He is described as: "Jubal E. Harshaw, LL.B., M.D., Sc.D., bon vivant, gourmet, sybarite, popular author extraordinary, neo-pessimist philosopher, devout agnostic, professional clown, amateur subversive, and parasite by choice."

== Character description ==
The character's name was chosen by Heinlein to have unusual overtones, like Jonathan Hoag. The character shares a surname with radio host Ruth Harshaw, a Denver radio host on whose program Heinlein frequently appeared, likely as a tribute.

The main character of the novel, Valentine Michael Smith, enshrines him (much to Harshaw's initial chagrin) as the patron saint of the church he founds. Critics have also suggested that Harshaw is actually a stand-in for Heinlein himself, based on similarities in career choice and general disposition; though Harshaw is much older than Heinlein was at the time of writing. Harshaw even is described as planning a story based on an idea Heinlein passed on to Theodore Sturgeon.

== Reception ==
Paul di Filippo called the character "the Heinlein mouthpiece in Stranger in a Strange Land".

Alexei Panshin found Harshaw to be a poorly drawn character. "Jubal Harshaw, too, is lessened by his super powers – doctor, lawyer, etc; his multiple training seems a gratuitous gift from Heinlein without reason or explanation. ... He is too pat".

Reviewing the posthumous publication of the original Stranger text in the Los Angeles Times, Rudy Rucker described Harshaw as "the first of a series of pompous libertarian windbags whose oral methane makes all of Heinlein’s later tomes into rapidly emptying locker rooms".

Literary critic Dan Schneider wrote of Heinlein's Stranger In A Strange Land that Harshaw was "a sybaritic fop and guru dilettante" and that Jubal "could also be seen as the stranger of the title" for being "a devout and fierce individualist in a world filled with cults and bureaucracies". Jubal's belief in his own free will, was one "which Mike, Jill, and the Fosterites misinterpret as a pandeistic urge, 'Thou art God!'"

A 2011 Medium review evaluates Harshaw negatively, labeling him "Heinlein’s crude wish-fulfillment stand-in for himself" and "a pedant" for whom: "There’s nothing another character can say to him that won’t produce a lecture in reply, and even the faintly interesting ones tend to slide back into tired sexist stereotypes by the time he’s done."

A more positive take came from literature professor Diane Parkin-Speer, who described Harshaw in Stranger in a Strange Land as "the typical Heinlein father figure: crusty, knowledgeable, iconoclastic, unorthodox, talkative", but goes on to opine that though he "runs his household in a patriarchal way", it is "a gentle patriarchal way that encourages individual choice and development".

When Heinlein's editor required him to make substantial cuts in the original Stranger manuscript, the bulk of the material cut was said to be lengthy monologues by Harshaw.

== Other fictional appearances ==
Harshaw also appears in three later Heinlein novels:

- The Number of the Beast (1980)
- The Cat Who Walks Through Walls (1985)
- To Sail Beyond the Sunset (1987)
