= Harvest (Neopagan magazine) =

American Neopagan magazine

- Harvest cover dated August 1992, artwork by Persephone
- Editor: Morven
- Categories: Neopagan zine
- Frequency: Eight issues a year
- Publisher: Morven
- First issue: November 1980
- Final issue Number: September 1992; Vol 12 No 8
- Country: United States of America
- Based in: Southborough, Massachusetts
- Language: English

Harvest was an American Neopagan magazine, published eight times a year between 1980 and 1992.

== History and profile ==
Harvest began in 1980 as grassroots, homemade zine. Over its twelve-year publication run it grew to be a 42-page, professionally printed magazine with international distribution and news-stand sales. Published out of Southboro, Massachusetts, Harvest served both the New England and international Neopagan communities. In an era before mainstream access to the Internet, and before the creation of the World Wide Web, Pagan magazines such as Harvest provided crucial opportunities for networking, sharing of information, and the development of the international Neopagan community.

In an Utne Reader feature on Pagan publications, James Tedford wrote,

The pagan resurgence has blossomed into a social as well as a spiritual movement. By its very nature paganism tends to be decentralized and non-hierarchical, and as a result pagans often feel isolated. It was largely this isolation that promoted the birth of many pagan publications.

In comparison to other Pagan publications of the time, Tedford continued,

Harvest offers fewer writings on astral travel and past-life regression, choosing instead to focus more on simple ways to celebrate the changing of the seasons and translate the imagery of pagan myth into your daily life. Harvest also has a political consciousness. Articles in past issues have discussed the links between the pagan and Green movements, pagan involvement in local environmental and anti-nuclear movements, and ways to use ritual, meditation, and other spiritual skills in political work.

In addition to covering the more common traditions of Neopaganism, such as Wicca, Harvest also gave a forum to some of the emerging Polytheistic Reconstructionist movements. A number of Neopagan writers had their first publication in Harvest, and the letters column provided an active forum for the development of community consensus on terminology and other issues of importance to Neopagans in the 1980s and 1990s.

In Drawing Down the Moon: Witches, Druids, Goddess-Worshippers, and Other Pagans in America Today, Margot Adler described Harvest as:

A Neo-Pagan journal devoted to bringing together the fruits of many traditions and belief systems as well as covering news of interest to the Pagan and Wiccan communities. ... One of the better Pagan journals, the "one" to get in the Northeast. Published eight times a year since 1980.

Harvest was founded by publishers, writers and editors Morven and Brenwyn. After Brenwyn left, Morven became the editor in chief. At the end of 1992, Morven retired from the staff to pursue her own writing. Respecting Morven's ownership of the name, the staff continued publishing quarterly for the next six issues, renaming the magazine Tides. Morven continued to serve in an informal capacity as an advisor to the new incarnation of the magazine.

== See also ==
- Green Egg
