= William LeSassier =

American herbalist

William LeSassier (November 6, 1948 – May 13, 2003) was an American herbalist and teacher of herbology. He developed William’s Triune System of Formulation, which continues to be taught by herbalists, including David Winston, who has significantly expanded LeSassier's materia medica. LeSassier taught and inspired many of the major herbalists currently practicing in the United States, including Matthew Wood, David Winston, Margi Flint, and Dina Falconi, and his influence is significant. His classes were taped and continue to influence herbal medicine in the United States.

== Biography ==
William LeSassier was born in 1948 in Texas, and grew up in Midland. He then moved to Southern California, where he learned many fields, including theosophy, palmistry, color therapy, and herbalism. LeSassier also audited medical school at UCLA.

By the age of 20 he was an active healer. In the late 1960s, LeSassier opened the Christos School of Herbal Medicine in Taos, New Mexico, where he ran a herb store.

In the 1960s he wandered around the U.S., Mexico, and the Amazon, doing healing work, teaching, and collecting herbs as he went. He wrote some of the first herb articles in Well-Being Magazine, one of the first publications on alternative medicine.

Around 1970 LeSassier found a teacher of Chinese medicine and persuaded the man to allow him to apprentice with him. He learned about the energetics of medicinal herbs and developed an individualized diagnosis system. By the 1970s, he was one of the most well-known herbalists in the country. In 1983, he settled in New York City and opened Chiron’s Magic Minerals, where he practiced and taught herbs, bodywork, and energy work. William closed Chiron's in 1989 and moved his practice into the office of Dr. Steven Schram at 132 East 28th street. The back yard of the office was home to many herbs that William grew there including nettles, hops, raspberries, spilanthes, comfrey, holy basel and catnip.

In 1993 he entered acupuncture school, but never graduated, being one course shy of the requirements. He continued to live in New York, and also spent time in a vacation home in the Blue Ridge Mountains which was also a school and nature preserve. He also visited Italy several times. He died in 2003 from complications of cirrhosis of the liver.

== Triune formulas ==
One hallmark of most serious herbalism is the use of herbs in a formula. LeSassier had been exposed to Chinese medicine where the standards were "one disease, many formulas" and individualizing formulas to the strengths and weaknesses of the patient. Herbs in the Chinese system are recognized by their effects on specific organs and meridians or organ systems. A Chinese formulation generally has a "king" herb that addresses the major problem, supported by "ministers" that either support it or address weak organ systems, and "servant" herbs that harmonize and carry the herbal effects to specific parts of the body. However, a system that bridged the various Western and Eastern herbal traditions was lacking.

The Triune System of Formulation was inspired by a vision LeSassier had during a period of personal difficulty — a vision that changed the direction of his herbal practice. He saw a triangle, and saw Pythagoras giving him a book.

The system consisted of one triangle inverted within a larger triangle, with the client’s constitution or core condition in the center and supporting organ systems in the flanking sides. According to the system, nine herbs would be used: three in larger amounts to support the core problem, with lower amounts for the supporting systems.

Herbs in the system are classified by their ability to either build or tonify (+), react amphoterically (which means to stabilize or harmonize) (0), or to eliminate (-). Herbs on the apex of each triangle represented the "king", the ruler/significant herb/neutral signified by a circle. A "minister", the herb that communicates to other plants and takes the message to the king, is signified by a plus sign. A "servant", the reciprocal part of the formula that acts upon/eliminates through the "doorways of the body". Measurement of herb was formulated by energetic strength, not weight, with the most potent herbs being used less than the milder ones.

== Personal life ==
In the 1960s, LeSassier married in Taos, and had a daughter, Ona Marie LeSassier. He later remarried in New York and had a son, Alex LeSassier in 1986. In 1989 he met his partner Daniela Noe, with whom he lived for the rest of his life.

== See also ==
- Traditional Chinese medicine
- Herbalism
- Pharmacognosy
- Botany
- Ethnobotany
