= Church of All Worlds =

American Neopagan group

- Dearinth – The official sigil of the Church of All Worlds, Inc.
- Abbreviation: CAW
- Formation: c. 1961
- Type: Religious organization
- Purpose: American Neopagan group whose stated mission is to evolve a network of information, mythology, and experience that provides a context and stimulus for reawakening Gaia and reuniting her children through Tribalism dedicated to responsible stewardship and evolving consciousness
- Headquarters: Toledo, Ohio, US
- Location: United States
- Members: 100

The Church of All Worlds (CAW) is an American Neopagan group whose stated mission is to evolve a network of information, mythology, and experience that provides a context and stimulus for reawakening Gaia and reuniting her children through tribal community dedicated to responsible stewardship and evolving consciousness. It is based in Cotati, California.

The key founder of CAW is Oberon Zell-Ravenheart, who serves the Church as "primate", later along with his wife, Morning Glory Zell-Ravenheart (d. 2014), designated high priestess. CAW was formed in 1962, evolving from a group of friends and lovers who were in part inspired by a fictional religion of the same name in the science fiction novel Stranger in a Strange Land (1961) by Robert A. Heinlein; the church's mythology includes science fiction to this day.

CAW's members, called Waterkin, espouse Paganism, but the Church is not a belief-based religion. Members experience Divinity and honor these experiences while also respecting the views of others. They recognize "Gaea," the Earth Mother Goddess and the Father God, as well as the realm of Faeries and the deities of many other pantheons. Many of their ritual celebrations center on the gods and goddesses of ancient Greece.

== Formation ==
CAW began in 1961 with a group of high school friends. One of these was Richard Lance Christie from Tulsa, Oklahoma. Christie was fascinated by the "self-actualization" concepts of Abraham Maslow, an American psychologist, and after meeting then-Timothy Zell at Westminster College in Fulton, Missouri, he began experiments in extrasensory perception. It was during this time that the group read Heinlein's science fiction novel, Stranger in a Strange Land (1961), which became the inspiration for CAW.

Heinlein's book, combined with Maslow's self-actualization concepts, led to the formation of a "waterbrotherhood" that Zell and Christie called Atl, the Aztec word for "water", and also meaning "home of our ancestors". Atl became dedicated to political and social change and the group grew to about 100 members.

Zell formed CAW from Atl, and filed for incorporation as a church in 1967. It was formally chartered on March 4, 1968, making it the third Pagan Church to incorporate; they followed the Church of Aphrodite, which incorporated in New York in 1939, followed by the Goddess and wilderness-based group, Feraferia, Inc. which received their incorporation on August 1, 1967.

== Early organization and beliefs ==
CAW modeled its organization after the group in Heinlein's novel, as a series of 9 nests in circles of advancement that were each named after a planet. The basic dogma of the CAW was that there was no dogma – the basic "belief" was a stated "lack of belief". Within their religion, the only sin was hypocrisy and the only crime in the eyes of the church was interfering with another person.

== Evolution ==
Moving toward an emphasis on nature eventually led to a breaking of the relationship between CAW and Atl. By 1974, CAW had nests in more than a dozen states around the United States. That year, Zell married Morning Glory (née Diana Moore) and in 1976 he and Morning Glory settled in Eugene, Oregon and then at the Coeden Brith land in northern California.

When Zell stepped away from central leadership, the Church of All Worlds suffered internal strife that led to most of the church dissolving. By 1978 the focus and headquarters shifted to California with the Zells and the nine-circle nest structure was revamped. CAW then served for several years as an umbrella organization for its subsidiaries.

== Subsidiaries ==
Morning Glory Zell founded the Ecosophical Research Association (ERA) in 1977 to research arcane lore and legends. Its first project of note was the creation of living unicorns in 1980, after noting that early art depicts the creatures as being more goat-like than horse-like. The Zells reconstructed what they claimed was an ancient unicorning procedure, a process involving surgically manipulating the horn buds of kids during their first week of life, and created several unicorns, some of which toured with the Ringling Brothers Circus for a time. The ERA sponsored a Mermaid expedition to Papua, New Guinea, in 1985 and a later ERA project involved the May 1996 worldwide ritual to draw upon and re-activate the Oracle at Delphi. This rite involved a relatively early attempt at utilizing online community and internet-facilitated virtual community rituals conducted simultaneously across different time zones, led by Maerian Morris, another former high priestess of CAW, working from Delphi. The reactivation of Delphi was the subject of a series of six editorials in Green Egg (issues 125 through 130) from November/December 1998 through September/October 1999.

In 1978 CAW merged with Nemeton, a Pagan organization founded by Gwydion Pendderwen and Alison Harlow. In 1987 CAW also absorbed Forever Forests, another one of Pendderwen's organizations. An outgrowth of Forever Forests was founded in 1983 by Anodea Judith, past president and high priestess of CAW, called Lifeways.

The Holy Order of Mother Earth (HOME), founded in 1978 by the Zells, is another subsidiary, dedicated to magical living and working with the land.

Oberon and Morning Glory Zell-Ravenheart have appeared at over 20 Starwood Festivals (and a few WinterStar Symposiums) over the past 25 years; because of this, there has been a Church of All Worlds presence at Starwood, called the CAWmunity, for over a decade.

== First Renaissance ==
By the mid-1980s, CAW had practically ceased operation outside of Ukiah, California, where the Zells relocated in 1985. Anodea Judith assumed presidency until 1991, and the structure of the organization was revamped with plans for more nest meetings, training courses, new rituals, and publications. By the late 1980s CAW had increased membership internationally, becoming particularly strong in Australia, where it was legally incorporated in 1992.

In 1998 Oberon Zell-Ravenheart took a year-and-a-day sabbatical from his role as primate, and the church headquarters were moved to Toledo, Ohio.

== Attempted termination & Second Renaissance ==
In August 2004, the board of directors decided to terminate CAW due to financial and legal struggles. In January, 2006, due to the effort of Jack Crispin Cain to help save the organization, CAW was reestablished with Zells again assuming a leadership role. In 2007, Green Egg, CAW's influential journal, returned to publication in an online format. The "3rd Phoenix Resurrection of the Church" continues to the present.

== See also ==
- Neopaganism in the United States
