= Morning Glory Zell-Ravenheart =

American writer and Neopagan priestess (1948–2014)

- Zell praying for healing (c. 2006)
- Born: Diana Moore; May 27, 1948; Long Beach, California, U.S.
- Died: May 13, 2014 (aged 65); Cotati, California, U.S.
- Other names: Morning Glory Ferns; Morning Glory Zell; Morning G'Zell
- Known for: Polyamory, neopagan community leadership
- Spouses: Gary Ferns; Oberon Zell-Ravenheart
- Children: 1

Morning Glory Zell-Ravenheart (May 27, 1948 – May 13, 2014), born as Diana Moore, subsequently known as Morning Glory Ferns, Morning Glory Zell and briefly Morning G'Zell, was an American community leader, writer, and lecturer in Neopaganism, as well as a priestess of the Church of All Worlds. An advocate of polyamory, she is credited with coining the word. With her husband Oberon Zell-Ravenheart, she designed deity images.

== Early life ==
Diana Moore was born in Long Beach, California on May 27, 1948. She was raised an only child in a strict Christian household by her Pentecostal mother, though she switched from attending a Methodist church to a Pentecostal one around age 10–12. At age 14, she broke with Christianity after arguing with her Methodist minister grandfather that animals had souls and went to heaven. She was strongly influenced by the Sybil Leek book, Diary of a Witch, which she read during high school. At the age of 17, Diana began practicing witchcraft. At the age of 20, she changed her name to Morning Glory because she did not care for the chastity requirement demanded of followers of the goddess Diana.

While en route to join a commune near Eugene, Oregon, in 1969, Morning Glory met a hitchhiker named Gary Ferns who joined her. The two were soon married, and the next year, she gave birth to a daughter whom she named Rainbow. As a mother, she was known as Morning Glory Ferns. Although Gary and Morning Glory conducted an open marriage, the union was broken when she met Timothy Zell after he gave the 1973 keynote speech at Gnosticon in Minnesota. Morning Glory divorced Gary and brought her daughter to St. Louis, Missouri, to live with Zell. Morning Glory and Zell married at the Gnosticon of Easter 1974; the ceremony was performed by Archdruid Isaac Bonewits and High Priestess Carolyn Clark.

== Church of All Worlds ==
In St. Louis, Morning Glory studied and was made a priestess of Zell's Church of All Worlds. She helped him edit the group's journal, Green Egg. In 1976 the two began almost a decade of traveling, adventure, and living in various retreats and in a school bus they converted to a mobile home. They founded the Ecosophical Research Association in 1977 at Coeden Brith, a ranch in rural Mendocino County, California, northwest of Ukiah, to investigate arcane lore and legends of cryptids such as Bigfoot and mermaids. Their wandering years ended in 1985 when they took up permanent residence at Coeden Brith, initially for the purpose of raising "unicorns" created from horn surgery on baby goats, which they did.

In 1979, Timothy Zell changed his first name to Otter, and for a short time the couple styled their surnames as G'Zell, a contraction of Glory Zell. In 1994, he changed his name to Oberon.

For Morning Glory, the ideal marriage had always been an open one, and her relationship with Zell developed into a polyamorous one made up of three people from 1984 to 1994, including Diane Darling. When this arrangement ended, Zell and Morning Glory bonded with others to make a marriage of five and sometimes six. The group took the collective surname Zell-Ravenheart, and lived in two large homes. Morning Glory's May 1990 article "A Bouquet of Lovers", first published in Green Egg, promoted the concept of a group marriage having more than two partners. The article is widely cited as the original source of the word "polyamory", although the word does not appear in the article—the hyphenated form "poly-amorous" does instead.

With Darling, Morning Glory revived Green Egg in May 1988. The journal had been defunct since 1976. In 1990, she established the business Mythic Images, offering for sale reproductions of goddess and mythology sculptures crafted by Zell. Morning Glory ran the business in addition to lecturing and writing.

== Personal life ==
In 1999, the Zell-Ravenhearts moved to Sonoma County, California, where Oberon started the Grey School of Wizardry, which as of 2014 is the world's only registered wizard academy.

Morning Glory went to the hospital in 2005 to treat broken bones suffered in a fall. There, she learned she had multiple myeloma. She received surgery, chemotherapy, and radiation treatments and also entreated her friends to form a healing circle. She experienced a great increase in health in 2007. She lapsed in taking her medications in late 2011, and the disease returned in early 2012. During a period of remission in August 2012, she was filmed for a documentary about polyamory for the Destination America television channel; the show called Hidden in America, the segment titled "Polyamory in America."

Her husband Oberon and his long-term marriage partner Julie O'Ryan appeared together on screen to talk about their practice of polyamory. Julie was and is a High Priestess in several Wiccan traditions. She became one of Oberon's lovers in the early 90s and has been his good friend ever since. However, she lives with her husband, Larry Marks, on Mt. Shasta. In reporting about the upcoming broadcast, Alan M of Polyamory in the News wrote that Morning Glory and Oberon, both battling cancer, looked "hale and hearty" in the preview available online.

In adolescence, her daughter Rainbow left to live with her father Gary, taking the name Gail.

== Death ==
Morning Glory Zell-Ravenheart died at her home on May 13, 2014, at age 65, of cancer.

== Writings ==
=== Books ===
- Creating Circles & Ceremonies: Rituals for All Seasons And Reasons, with Oberon Zell-Ravenheart. New Page Books, 2006; ISBN 1-56414-864-5.
- Grimoire for the Apprentice Wizard, with Oberon Zell-Ravenheart, et al. New Page Books, 2004; ISBN 1-56414-711-8.

=== Article ===
- "Firelight and Moon-Shadows: A Survey of Wiccan Lore" in Pop! Goes the Witch: The Disinformation Guide to 21st Century Witchcraft, ed. by Fiona Horne. The Disinformation Company, 2004; ISBN 0-9729529-5-0.
