= Baghor stone =

Indian archeological artifact

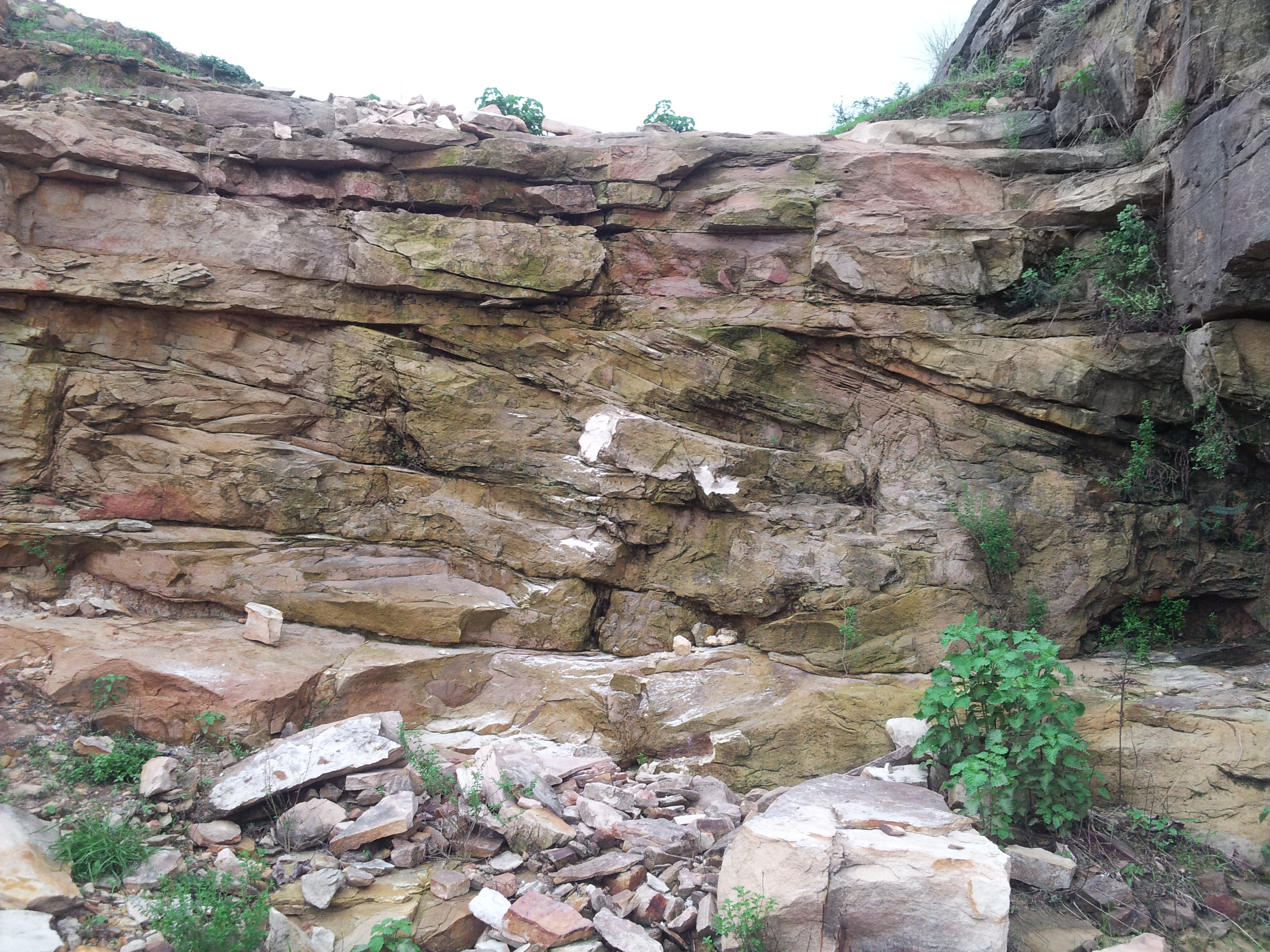
The type of sandstone from which the Baghor stone was made. Uttar Pradesh, India

Baghor stone is an Upper Paleolithic archaeological object that was found in the Son river valley near the village of Medhauli, in the Sidhi District, Madhya Pradesh, India. The stone was found at the site of Baghor I, which is located near the base of the Kaimur Escarpment. It was first excavated in 1980.

Baghor stone is a natural triangular piece of local sandstone; it is colourful, and decorated with yellow pigment. These types of stones may be found on top of the escarpment. The Baghor site, with all its many lithic artefacts, was probably formed between 9000 BC and 8000 BC. Researchers dated the Upper Paleolithic small blade industry at the site to be approximately 11,870 years old (± 120 YBP) or possibly older than 10,000 BC. The research team mentioned in 1983 that there is a very strong possibility that the stone represents a shrine to Shakti.

== Site description ==
The site was first excavated under the direction of archaeologists G. R. Sharma of Allahabad University and J. Desmond Clark of University of California, and assisted by Jonathan Mark Kenoyer and J.N. Pal.

This was determined as a short-term occupation site. The floor was composed of rubble, and there was a lot of manufacturing waste from stone tool manufacture. Many varieties of backed blades and geometric microliths were found, as well as grinding stones and ring stones.

Later, as a lot of material was removed, a stone platform was identified, with the Baghor triangular stone in the center. This platform was interpreted as a site for ritual ceremonies.

Archaeologists required a lot of time and analysis to determine the original role and meaning of the Baghor stone.

== Shakti worship ==
Numerous ethnographic comparisons have been made between the palaeolithic site of Baghor I and some of the other sites in the area that are still being honoured today by local peoples. Thus, Baghor site has been interpreted as the earliest mother goddess shrine in the subcontinent. Shakti worship is one of the local personifications of this tradition.

Researchers state that the significance of the central triangular stone became clear when considering current local practices, as inhabitants use similar stones with concentric geometric laminations, often triangular, as a symbol of the mother goddess. Specifically, the tribal groups Kol and Baiga have been mentioned. Their primary subsistence has traditionally been hunting and gathering, and they currently worship at the sites rather similar to Baghor. These tribes have Dravidian affinities. A 2020 genetic study, however, on the Kol tribe found genetic and linguistic non-correspondence. The Kol share their more recent common ancestry with both the Dravidian and Indo-European speaking populations, and are genetically closer to the latter.

The living shrine at which it was found is currently used as a place for worshipping Devi by Hindus. The triangular shape of the stone is that of the Kali Yantra which is also still in use across India. The Kol and Baiga tribes consider the triangular shape to symbolize the mother goddess 'Mai', variously named Kerai, Kari, Kali, Kalika or Karika.

== See also ==
- Yantra
- South Asian Stone Age

== Bibliography ==
- Chattopadhyaya, Indrani (2016). "Living Tradition: A Study of Prehistoric Rock-paintings and Indigenous Art from District Sonbhadra, Southern Uttar Pradesh, India". Athens Journal of Humanities and Arts. 3 (4): 251–270. doi:10.30958/ajha.3.4.3. ISSN 2241-7702.
- Misra, V. N. (2001). "Prehistoric human colonization of India". Journal of Biosciences. 26 (4): 491–531. doi:10.1007/BF02704749. ISSN 0250-5991. PMID 11779962. S2CID 26248907.
- Jones, Sacha C.; Pal, J.N. (2009). "The Palaeolithic of the Middle Son valley, north-central India: Changes in hominin lithic technology and behaviour during the Upper Pleistocene". Journal of Anthropological Archaeology. 28 (3): 323–341. doi:10.1016/j.jaa.2009.05.003. ISSN 0278-4165.
