= Yantra =

Mystical diagram in Tantric traditions

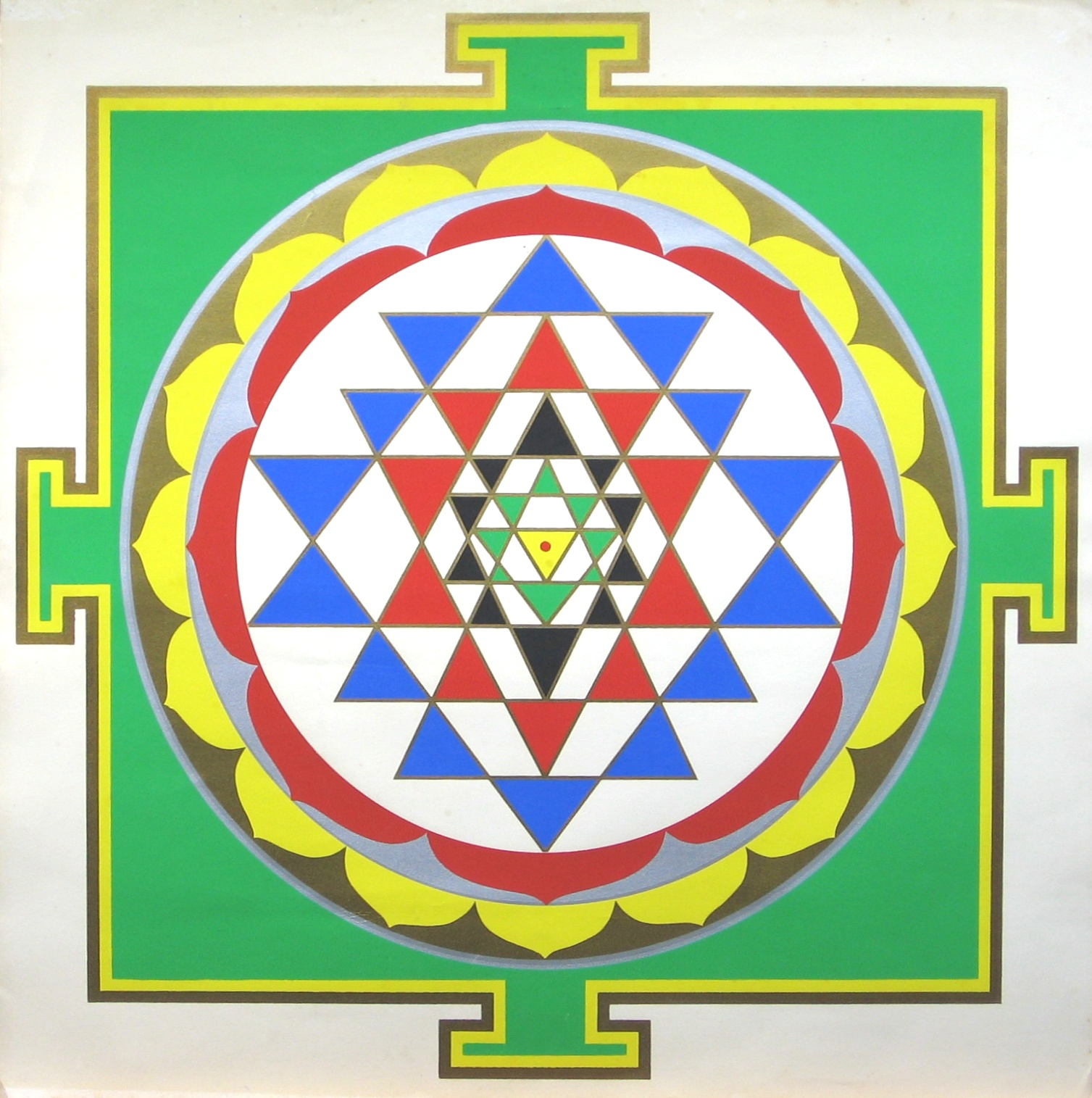
Sri Yantra by Harish Johari using traditional colors

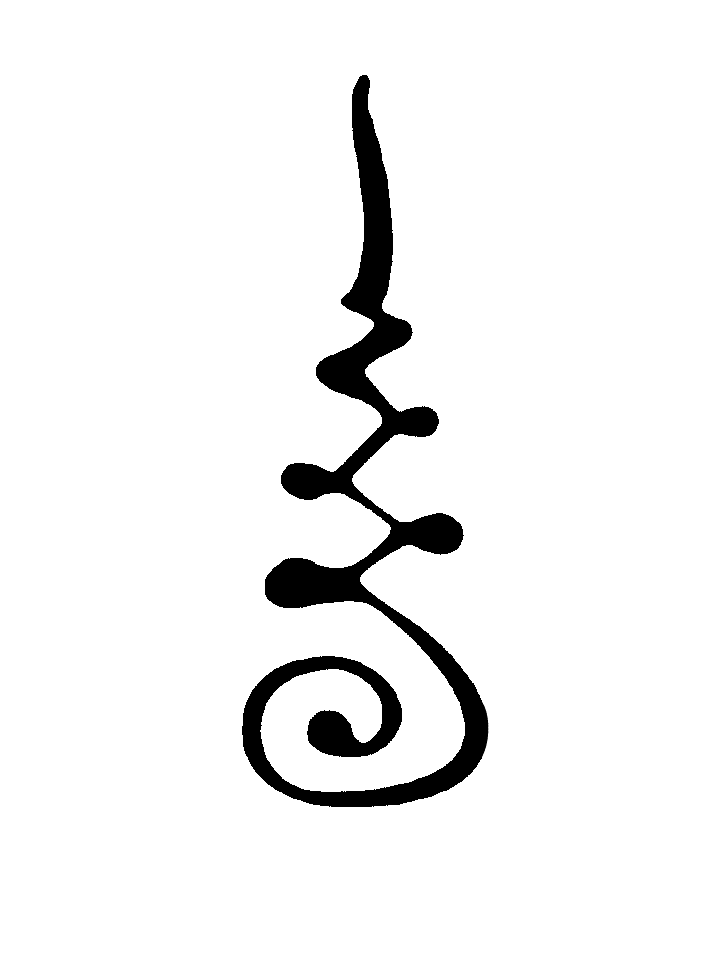
Unalome is the sacred Yantra used widely in Southeast Asian Buddhism

Yantra (Sanskrit: यन्त्र, romanized: yantrá, lit. 'machine, contraption') is a geometrical diagram, mainly from the Tantric traditions of the Indian religions. Yantras are used for the worship of deities in temples or at home; as an aid in meditation; and for the benefits believed given by their occult powers based on Hindu astrology and tantric texts. They are also used for adornment of temple floors, due mainly to their aesthetic and symmetric qualities. Specific yantras are traditionally associated with specific deities and/or certain types of energies used for accomplishment of certain tasks or vows that may be either materialistic or spiritual in nature. They become a prime tool in certain sadhanas performed by the sadhaka, the spiritual seeker. Yantras hold great importance in Hinduism, Jainism, and Buddhism.

Representations of the yantra in India have been considered to date back to 11,000–10,000 BCE. The Baghor stone, found in an Upper Paleolithic context in the Son River Valley, is considered the earliest example by G. R. Sharma, who was involved in the excavation of the stone (it was dated to 25,000–20,000 BCE). The triangular stone, which includes triangular engravings on one side, was found daubed in ochre in what was considered a site related to worship. Worship of goddesses in that region was found to be practiced in a similar manner to the present day. Kenoyer, who was also involved in the excavation, considered it to be associated with Shakti. This triangular shape looks very much similar to Kali Yantra and Muladhara Chakra.

Mantras, the Sanskrit syllables inscribed on yantras, are essentially "thought forms" representing divinities or cosmic powers that exert their influence by means of sound-vibrations.

== Etymology ==
In Rigvedic Sanskrit, yantra meant an instrument for restraining or fastening, a prop, support, or barrier, etymologically deriving from the root yam, "to sustain, support" and the -tra suffix, expressing instrumentation. The literal meaning is still evident in the medical terminology of Sushruta, where the term refers to blunt surgical instruments such as tweezers or a vice. The meaning of "mystical or occult diagram" arises in the medieval period (Kathasaritsagara, Pancharatra).

== Usage and meaning ==
Yantras are usually associated with a particular deity and are used for specific benefits, such as: for meditation; protection from harmful influences; development of particular powers; attraction of wealth or success, etc. For instance, the Sivali yantra, used mainly in Southeast Asian Buddhism, is used for the attraction of wealth and good luck. They are often used in daily ritual worship at home or in temples, and sometimes worn as a talisman.

As an aid to meditation (meditative painting), yantras represent the deity that is the object of meditation. These yantras emanate from the central point, the bindu. A yantra typically has several geometric shapes radiating concentrically from the center, including triangles, circles, hexagons, octagons, and symbolic lotus petals. The outside often includes a square representing the four cardinal directions, with doors to each. A popular form is the Sri Chakra, or Sri Yantra, which represents the goddess in her form as Tripura Sundari. Sri Chakra also includes a representation of Shiva, and is designed to show the totality of creation and existence, along with the user's own unity with the cosmos.

Yantras can be on a flat surface or three-dimensional. They can be drawn or painted on paper, engraved on metal, or any flat surface. They tend to be smaller in size than the similar mandala, traditionally with less color.

Occult yantras are used as good luck charms, to ward off evil, as preventative medicine, in exorcism, etc., by virtue of magical power. When used as talismans, yantras are viewed as representing a deity who can be called on at will by the user. They are traditionally consecrated and energized by a priest, including the use of mantras closely associated with the specific deity and yantra. Practitioners believe that a yantra that is not energized with a mantra is lifeless. In Sri Lankan Buddhism, practitioners are required to have the yantra of the deity with them, once the deity has shown acceptance of their prayer.

Gudrun Bühnemann classifies three general types of yantras based on their usage:

1. Yantras that are used as foundation for ritual implements such as lamps or vessels. These are typically simple geometric shapes upon which the implements are placed.
2. Yantras used in regular worship, such as the Sri Yantra. These include geometric diagrams energized with mantras to the deity, and sometimes include written mantras in the design.
3. Yantras used in specific desire-oriented rites. These are often made on birch bark or paper, and can include special materials such as flowers, rice paste, or ashes.

== Structural elements and symbolism ==
Kali yantra

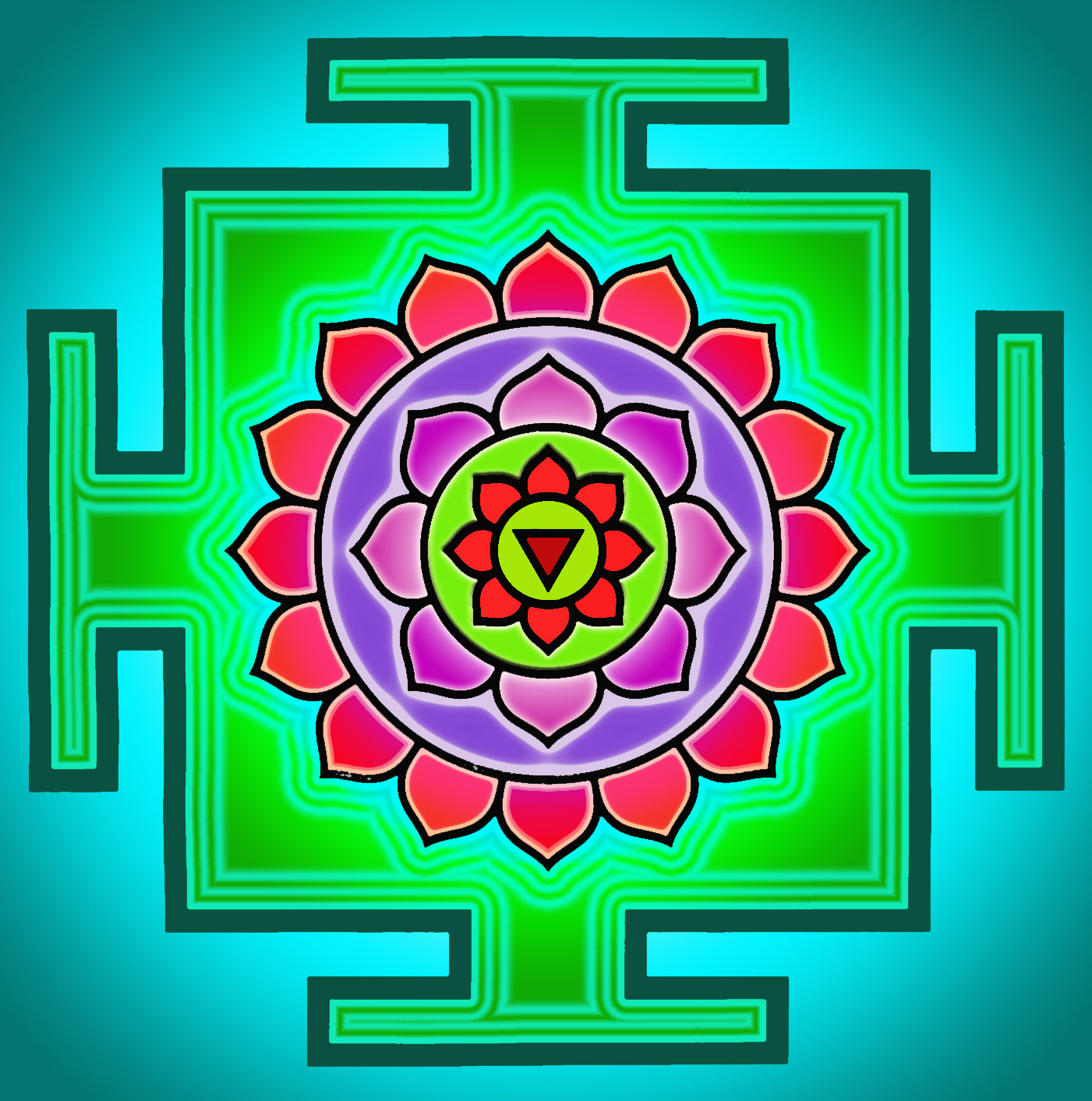
The yantra of Matangi, the tantric Saraswati

A yantra comprises geometric shapes, images, and written mantra. Triangles and hexagrams are common, as are circles and lotuses of 4 to 1,000 petals. Saiva and Shakti yantras often feature the prongs of a trishula.

Mantra
Yantras frequently include mantras written in Sanskrit.
Use of colors in traditional yantra is entirely symbolic, and not merely decorative or artistic. Each color is used to denote ideas and inner states of consciousness. White/Red/Black is one of the most significant color combinations, representing the three qualities or gunas of nature (prakriti). White represents sattwa or purity; red represents rajas or the activating quality; black represents tamas or the quality of inertia. Specific colors also represent certain aspects of the goddess. Not all texts give the same colors for yantras. Aesthetics and artistry are meaningless in a yantra if they are not based on the symbolism of the colors and geometric shapes.
Bindu
The central point of traditional yantras have a bindu or point, which represents the main deity associated with the yantra. The retinue of the deity is often represented in the geometric parts around the center. The bindu in a yantra may be represented by a dot or small circle, or may remain invisible. It represents the point from which all of creation emanates. Sometimes, as in the case of the Linga Bhairavi yantra, the bindu may be presented in the form of a linga.
Trikonā
Most Hindu yantras include trikonā (triangles). Downward-pointing triangles represent the feminine aspect of God or Shakti, while upward-pointing triangles represent God's masculine aspect, as in Shiva.
Satkonā
Satkonās or Hexagrams as shown in yantras are two equilateral triangles intertwined, representing the union of male and female aspects of divinity, or Shiva and Shakti.
Lotus (Kamal)
Mandalas and yantras both frequently include lotus petals, which represent purity and transcendence. Eight-petaled lotuses are common, but lotuses in yantras can include 2, 4, 8, 10, 12, 16, 24, 32, 100, 1000 or more petals.
Circle (Gola)
Many mandalas have three concentric circles in the center, representing manifestation.
Outer square
Many mandalas have an outer square or nested squares, representing the earth and the four cardinal directions. Often they include sacred doorways on each side of the square or Chakorā.
Panchkonā
Yantras infrequently use a Panchkonā (pentagram). Some yantras of Guhyakali have a pentagram, due to the number five being associated with Kali.
Ashtakonā
Ashtakonās or octagons are also infrequent in yantras, where they represent the eight directions.

Yantra designs in modern times have deviated from the traditional patterns given in ancient texts and traditions. Designers in the west may copy design elements from Nepali/tantric imitations of yantras.

== Yantra tattooing ==
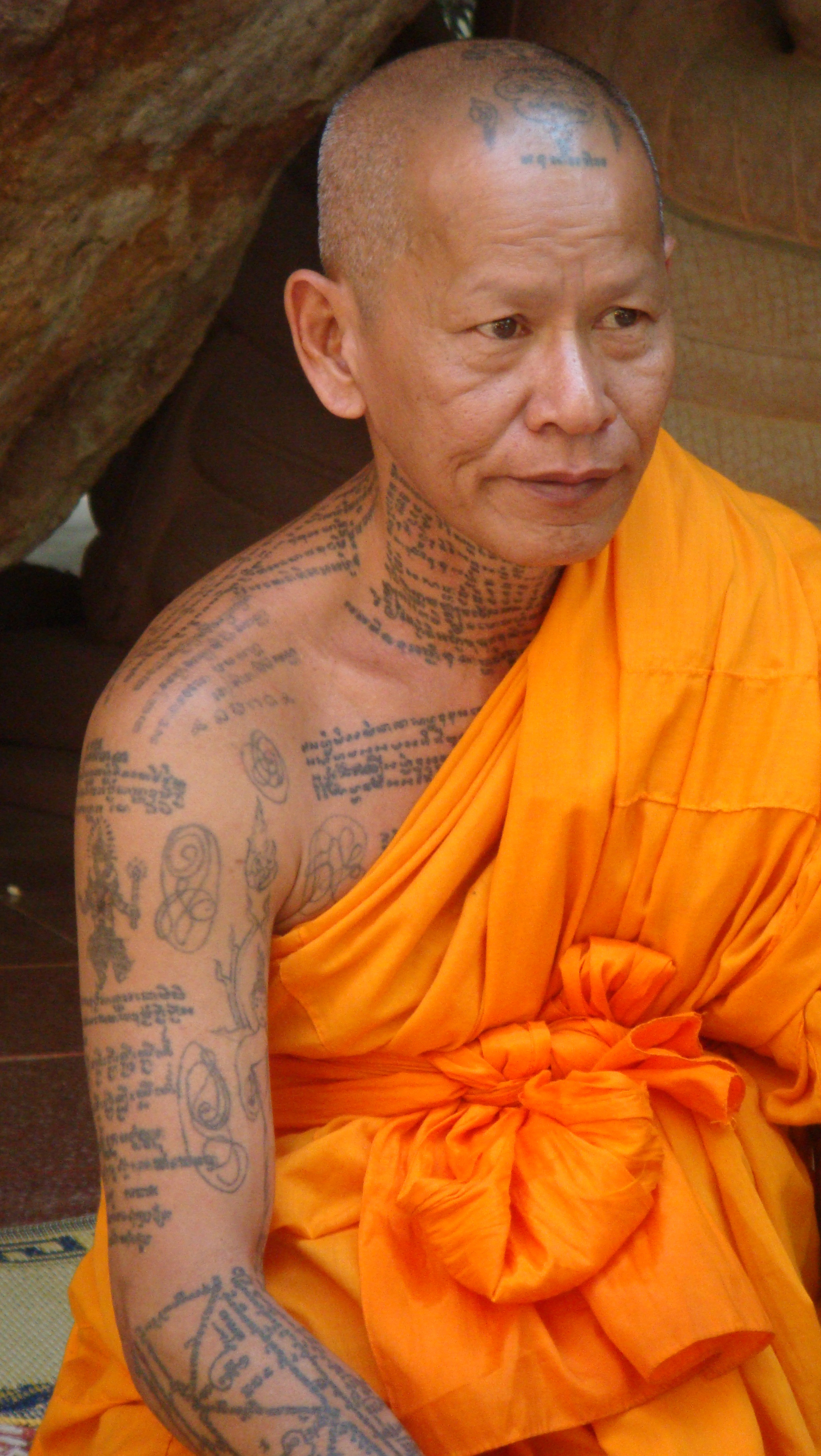
Cambodian monk covered in yantra tattoos

Yantra Tattooing or Sak Yant is a form of tattooing using yantra designs in Buddhism. It consists of sacred geometrical, animal and deity designs accompanied by Pali phrases that are said to offer power, protection, fortune, charisma and other benefits for the bearer. Sak yant designs are normally tattooed by ruesi, wicha practitioners, and Buddhist monks or Brahmin priests, traditionally with a metal rod sharpened to a point (called a khem sak).

== Yantra drawing ==
The world’s largest Sri Chakra, measuring 67,400 sq ft was drawn on ground in Cranbury, New Jersey under the guidance of Guru Karunamaya.

== Gallery ==
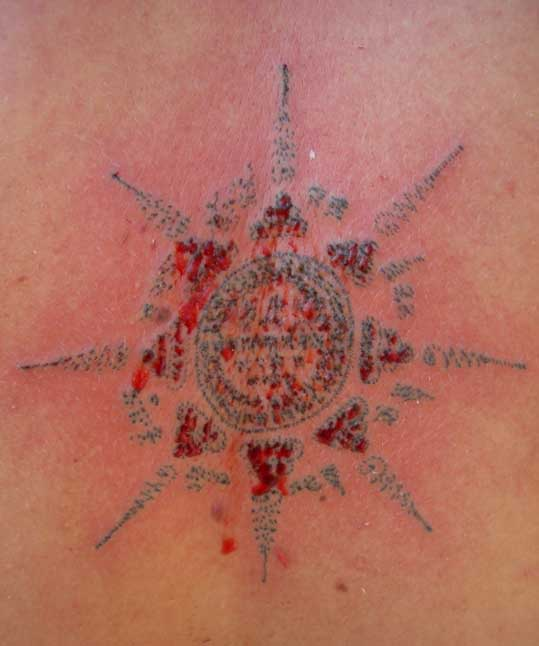
Yan Paet-thit, a Thai yantra tattoo

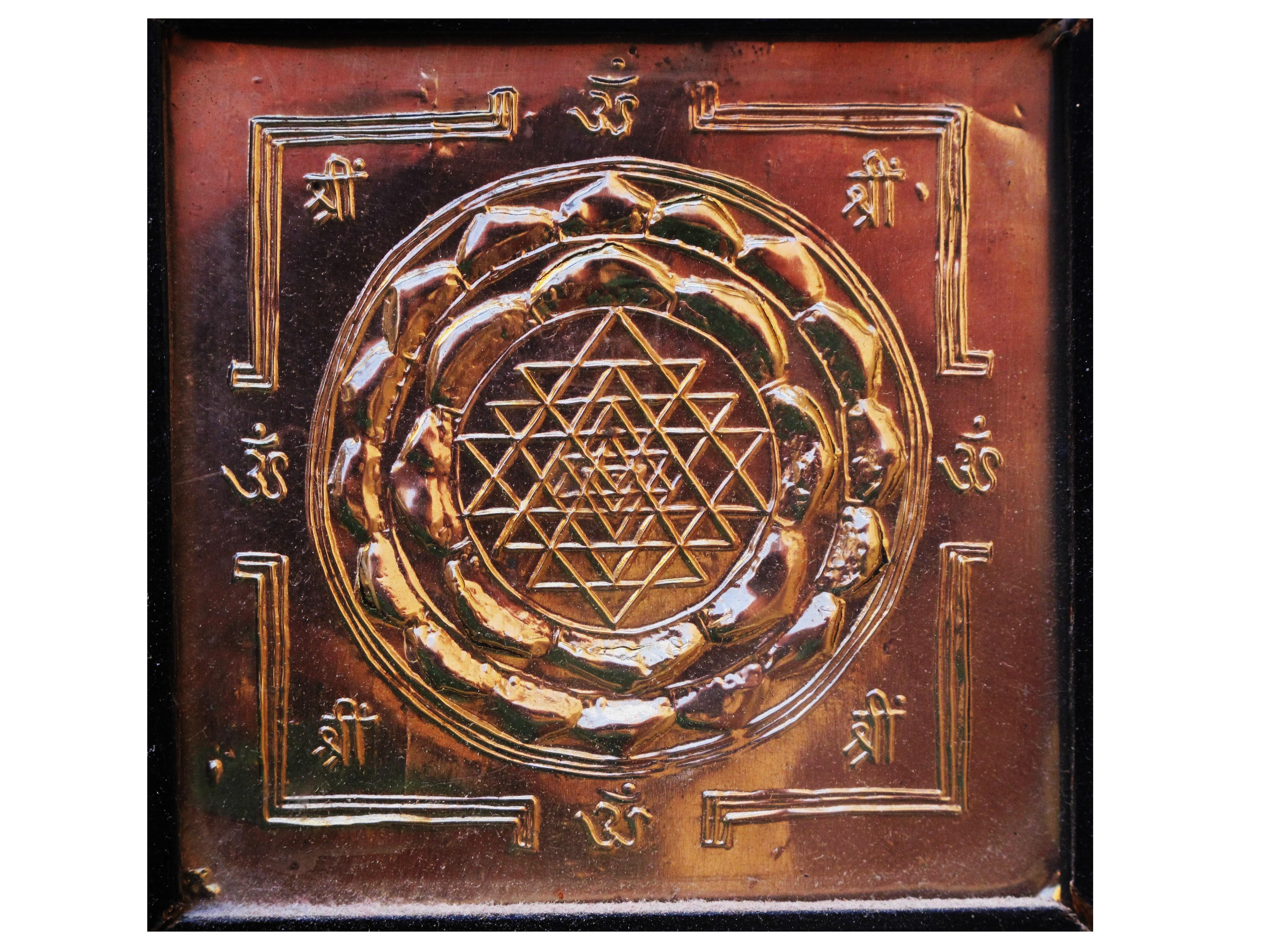
Traditional engraved copper Sri Yantra

Yantra of Paramashiva, with trident

The Sri Yantra diagram

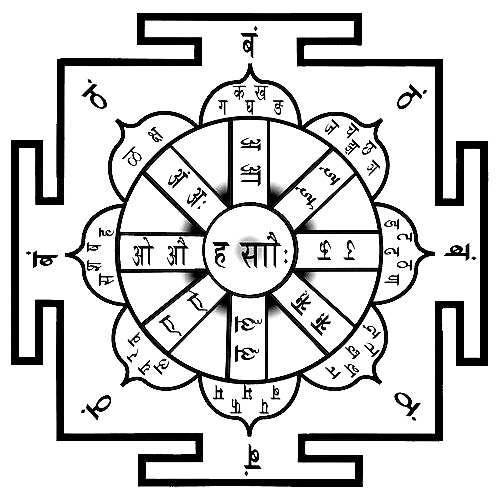
Ashtamatrika yantra diagram

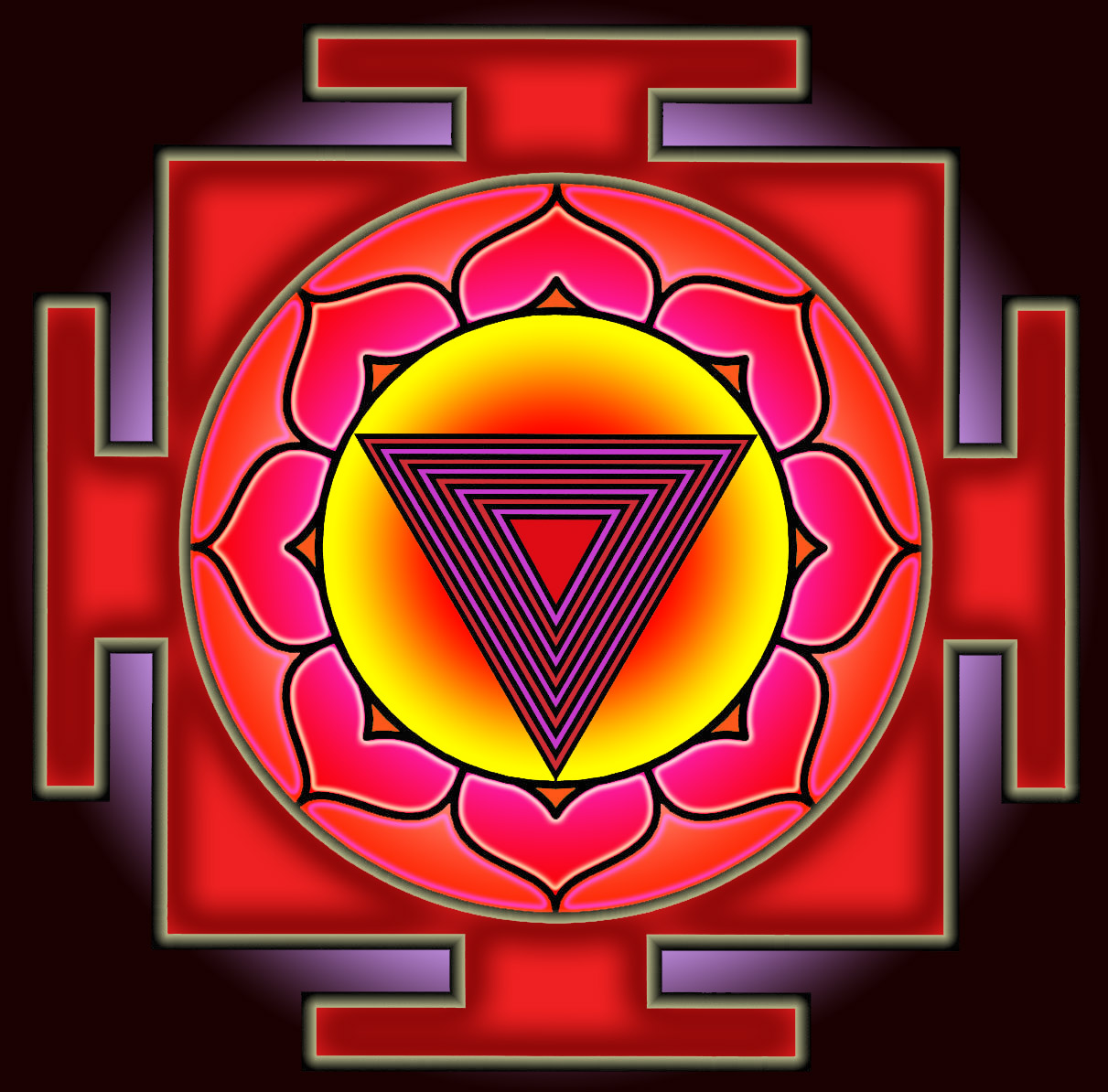
Tripurabhairava yantra diagram

== See also ==
- Baghor stone
- Kolam
- Mandala
- Muggu
- Rangoli
- Sacred geometry
- Shri Yantra
- Sriramachakra
- Yantra tattooing
