= Oberon Zell-Ravenheart =

American writer and Neopagan leader

Oberon Zell
- Born: Timothy Zell; November 30, 1942 (age 83); St. Louis, Missouri, United States
- Occupations: Writer, artist, speaker, teacher, religious leader
- Years active: 1967 to present
- Known for: Paganism, wizardry, Living Unicorns, polyamory
- Notable work: Grimoire for the Apprentice Wizard; The Millennial Gaia; The Living Unicorn

Oberon Zell (born Timothy Zell, November 30, 1942; formerly known as Otter G'Zell and Oberon Zell-Ravenheart) is an American Neopagan writer, speaker and religious leader. He is the co-founder of the Church of All Worlds.

== Education ==
Born on November 30, 1942, in St. Louis, Missouri, Zell earned a Bachelor of Arts degree in psychology from Westminster College in Fulton, Missouri, in 1965 before briefly enrolling in a doctoral program in clinical psychology at Washington University in St. Louis. He also received a Doctor of Divinity degree from Life Science College in Rolling Meadows, Illinois, (a defunct nonresidential seminary) in 1967. In 1968, he completed a teaching certificate at Harris–Stowe State University. His parents were Protestants.

== Neopaganism ==
In an interview with Natalie Zaman in 2008, Zell described himself as a Wizard. Distinguishing his practice from the wizards of fiction, Zell used the alternative spelling magick (with final "k") and claimed that his interest therein began at an early age with the reading of Greek myths and fairy tales. As a child, Zell had visions, which his mother told him were derived from the life of his grandfather.

An early advocate of deep ecology, Zell claims to have been the first to have articulated and published the Gaia Hypothesis (using the spelling "Gaea") in 1970, independently of James Lovelock, who is usually given credit. Along with his wife Morning Glory and the other members of his group marriages, he has been influential in the modern polyamory movement.

Zell co-founded the Ecosophical Research Association in 1977, an organization that explores the truth behind myths. This group was known for the authentic "Living Unicorns" they created by minor surgery to the horn buds of goats, a technique he was granted a patent for in 1984. One of their unicorns, Lancelot, toured with the Ringling Bros. and Barnum & Bailey Circus.

== Church of All Worlds ==
With R. Lance Christie, Zell founded the Church of All Worlds (CAW) on April 7, 1962, by the ritual of "sharing water". This foundation ritual was practiced by a fictional church of the same name in Robert A. Heinlein's Stranger in a Strange Land. Zell and Christie attributed their inspiration to Heinlein's novel. From the 1960s through the late 1990s, Zell served as High Priest and Primate of the church. He returned to lead the Church of All Worlds, Inc. in 2005 and currently serves as First Primate.

== Role in Neopagan community ==
A sculptor and graphic artist as well as an author, Zell has created numerous images of Pagan deities—some based upon historical images, others his original creations. With his family, he created Mythic Images, a business through which his artwork is distributed.

=== Green Egg ===
As the creator and original editor of the NeoPagan magazine Green Egg in 1968, Zell was an early popularizer of the term "Neo-Pagan". When Green Egg began publishing as a spirit-duplicated newsletter, Zell used the term "Neo-Pagan" to describe the new religious movement he was helping to create. Green Egg later grew to be a semi-glossy magazine with international distribution and, in an era before the Internet, its letters column provided a widely distributed public forum for discussion and networking. Green Egg is currently published as an online magazine, edited by Katrina Rasbold.

=== Grey School of Wizardry ===
Oberon is the founder and Headmaster Emeretus of the Grey School of Wizardry, an online school specializing in the teaching of a wide range of ancient wisdom and esoteric magic. In November 2022 he passed the title and mantle of Headmaster to his protege, Nicholas Kingsley. Zell continues to teach in the School, and remains President of the Board of Directors.

The Grey School incorporated on March 14, 2005 as a non-profit educational institution in the State of California. The school grew from lessons originally created by the Grey Council, a team of two dozen practitioners, who with Zell, wrote the Grimoire for the Apprentice Wizard and later the Companion for the Apprentice Wizard. While initially conceived for ages 11–17, the school currently has mostly adult students. The school comprises sixteen departments of study, various clubs and organizations, a forum area, a prefect/captain system, opportunities for awards and merits and a house/lodge system for adults and youths in which they can communicate directly with each other. Youth (under 18) students are grouped into the house of Psyche. Adult (18+) students are sorted into four lodges: Society of the Four Winds, Order of the Dancing Flames, Coterie of the Flowing Waters, and Circle of the Standing Stones.

=== Speaker and teacher ===
Zell regularly presents workshops, lectures, and ceremonies at NeoPagan events. He and his late wife Morning Glory have appeared at more than 40 Starwood Festivals and WinterStar Symposiums over four decades, and maintained a Church of All Worlds presence at Starwood, called the CAWmunity, for over a decade.

From 1998 to 2014 Oberon and Morning Glory Zell lived in Sonoma County, California, where they were members of the Sonoma County Pagan Network. He was a frequent speaker at the organization's local activities, served on the Board of Directors, and contributed articles to its website.

== Health ==
During a routine colonoscopy, doctors found a cancerous growth attached to Zell's colon, and removed it laparoscopically at Petaluma Valley Hospital. Following surgery, he underwent a six-month course of chemotherapy and continued a robust schedule of travel and teaching. Zell regards himself as cured of the cancer. He resided in Sonoma County, California, with Morning Glory until her death at age 65 from multiple myeloma on May 13, 2014.

Morning Glory died at home, surrounded by family, friends, lovers, and more than 360 Goddess images she had collected from around the world. Her body was laid into the Earth at the Church of All Worlds sanctuary of Annwfn, with an apple tree planted over her heart. Arranging all the legalities for Morning Glory's green burial secured Annwfn as an officially-recognized cemetery for full body burials—something Morning Glory herself had tried to do for decades without success. In the years since, other Pagans have had their green burials at Annwfn.

After burying Morning Glory, Oberon remained at their home (RavenHaven) for another year, while searching with friends for a suitable new home. In October 2015, he moved in with a couple in Santa Cruz, CA, where they opened a center in town they called the Academy of Arcana. It featured a store, a library, classroom, museum, meeting space and offices. However, it was not economically viable, and had to close at the end of Nov. 2017. Oberon put everything he owned into storage.

The following June Oberon embarked on a 2-year "Walkabout of the Wandering Wizard," driving back and forth and up and down all over the US, with a few month-long trips to the Yucatan, Guatemala and Ecuador. He spent four months in Salem, MA, and attended the 2018 Parliament of the World's Religions in Toronto. After another four months in Nashville, TN, he was invited to the Venusian Church Longhouse in WA, where he spent the next 2½ years, departing in October 2022 for a couple of months in Michigan before settling in Asheville, NC, where on July 4, 2023, he became engaged to Rhiannon Martin, Priestess of Serpentstone.

Oberon continues to write books and appear as a special guest and presenter at Pagan events around the country.

== Bibliography ==
- Grimoire for the Apprentice Wizard. New Page Books, US (Feb. 14, 2004), ISBN 1-56414-711-8, ISBN 978-1-56414-711-0
- Companion for the Apprentice Wizard. New Page Books, US (Jan. 1, 2006), ISBN 1-56414-835-1, ISBN 978-1-56414-835-3
- Creating Circles & Ceremonies: Rituals for All Seasons and Reasons (with Morning Glory Zell-Ravenheart) New Page Books (Aug. 1, 2006), ISBN 1-56414-864-5, ISBN 978-1-56414-864-3
- Dragonlore: From the Archives of the Grey School of Wizardry. With Dekirk, Ash "Leoparddancer". New Page Books (Aug. 1, 2006), ISBN 1-56414-868-8, ISBN 978-1-56414-868-1
- Gargoyles: From the Archives of the Grey School of Wizardry. With Pesznecker, Susan "Moonwriter". New Page Books (Feb. 15, 2007), ISBN 1-56414-911-0, ISBN 978-1-56414-911-4
- A Wizard's Bestiary. With Dekirk, Ash "Leoparddancer". New Page Books (Dec. 30, 2007), ISBN 1-56414-956-0, ISBN 978-1-56414-956-5
- Green Egg Omelette: An Anthology of Art and Articles from the Legendary Pagan Journal. New Page Books (Nov. 26, 2008), ISBN 978-1601630469
- Prophecy & the End of the World (as we know it): Apocalypse or Solartopia? with Harvey Wasserman. Solartopia, Kindle Book (2012), ASIN B009YLLD6G
- The Wizard and the Witch: Seven Decades of Counterculture, Magick, and Paganism: An Oral History of Oberon Zell and Morning Glory, by John C. Sulak with Oberon & Morning Glory Zell. Llewellyn (2014), ISBN 978-0738714820
- Death Rights & Rites: A Practical Guide to a Meaningful Death, with Judith Fenley. Llewellyn (2020) ISBN 978-0738748818
- Song of Gaea, with Kiri Johnson (a children's book) Art by Oberon, Sage Lampros, Pratima Sarkar. TheaGenesis (2021) ISBN 978-1087955803
- That Undiscover'd Country: A Traveler's Guide to the Afterlife. Black Moon Pubs (2021) ISBN 978-1-890399-85-6
- Goodbye Jesus, I've Gone Home to Mother, (Left Hand Press, 2021) ISBN 978-1-890399-91-7
- The Wizard and the Witch: Special two-volume expanded edition, by John C. Sulak with Oberon & Morning Glory Zell, Vol. 1. Left Hand Press (2021) ISBN 979-8985320404
- The Wizard and the Witch: Special two-volume expanded edition, by John C. Sulak with Oberon & Morning Glory Zell, Vol. II. Left Hand Press (2021), ISBN 979-8985320411
- A Wizard's Bestiary (2nd Edition), with Ash DeKirk. Left Hand Press (2022), ISBN 979-8-9865228-2-1
- GaeaGenesis: Conception and Birth of the Living Earth, Left Hand Press (2022), ISBN 979-8-9853204-4-2
- Barsoom: Mapping the Mythic Mars, Ingram (2022) ISBN 978-1087953151

== Discography ==
- The Church of All Worlds - Lecture on cassette ACE
- Men and the Goddess - Lecture (on cassette) ACE
- A Bouquet of Lovers - Lecture with Morning Glory Zell-Ravenheart (on CD and cassette) ACE
- Living Your Own Myth - Lecture with Morning Glory Zell-Ravenheart (on cassette) ACE

== Media appearances ==
Oberon Zell has been interviewed on many television and radio shows in the United States, England, and Australia. Some of these include:

Television

- The Sunday Show (Australia)
- Channel 4(England)
- Strange Universe
- A&E
- The Marilyn Kagan Show
- Faith Under Fire with Lee Strobel
- "The Devil's Advocate with Charles Ashman", KPLR-TV (1974)
- Soapbox, KPLR-TV (1973)
- “Brother Wease” WCMF-FM
- “Dave Wilson” WIBC-AM
- “Exploring Unknown Phenomena” KZUM 89.3-FM
- “Clear Reception” WTMD-FM (NPR)
- “Allan & Rebecca” WQAL-FM
- “Larry & Sheryl” ALQ
- “Jack Roberts” Cable Radio Network
- “Louie Free” WWOW
- “Bulldog’s Morning Show” PJD5-FM
- "96 Rock Mornings with Salt and Demetri the Greek" (July 24, 2007)
- "Coast to Coast AM" (January 13, 2008) and (March 21, 2012)
- "For your health"
