= Green Egg =

Neopagan magazine

- Categories: Neopagan
- Frequency: Quarterly
- Publisher: Church of All Worlds, Inc.
- Founder: Oberon Zell-Ravenheart
- Founded: 1968
- First issue: 1968
- Final issue: 2007 (continued online)
- Country: United States
- Language: English
- Website: greeneggmagazine.com

Green Egg is a Neopagan magazine published by the Church of All Worlds intermittently since 1968. The Encyclopedia of American Religions described it as a significant periodical.

== First version, 1968–1976 ==
Green Egg was created by Oberon Zell-Ravenheart, who was the editor from 1968 to 1974. It started as a one-page ditto sheet. It continued under another editor for two more years, by which point it had grown over 80 issues into a 60-page journal. According to J. Gordon Melton in the Encyclopedia of American Religions, it became "the most significant periodical in the Pagan movement during the 1970s and made Oberon Zell-Ravenheart, its editor, a major force in Neo-Paganism". It became dormant in 1976.

A third of the issues were devoted to letters to the publication, from a range of pagans and occultists. The occult neo-Nazi James Madole frequently wrote to the magazine in this section.

Margot Adler's sociological study Drawing Down the Moon: Witches, Druids, Goddess-Worshippers, and Other Pagans in America Today was first published in 1979, shortly after the first incarnation of Green Egg ceased. (Adler's work was revised and updated in 1986, 1996, and 2006.) Adler used Green Egg as one of the main ways of distributing her survey, and received hundreds of responses from its readers. Drawing Down the Moon repeatedly refers to Green Egg as formative in modern American Paganism. "It took a catalyst to create a sense of collectivity around the word Pagan, and in the United States the Church of All Worlds and its Green Egg filled this role." The magazine created a communication network (in pre-internet days) among the many earth religions that were coming into being. Adler was impressed by the "free-ranging and diverse" views found in its pages, commenting that, "There was less common ground assumed in Green Egg than in any other publication I had ever seen." It was highly synergistic, bringing together hundreds of groups and ideas for debate in print, covering subjects relating to "ecology, ethics, tribalism, magic, science fiction, and the relationship of human beings to the planet". Adler reports that some Pagans told her in the late 1970s that they were glad of its demise, because there would be less bickering between various factions. She, however, judged it "key to the movement's vitality".

== Later versions, 1988 onwards ==
Rosemary Ellen Guiley states in The Encyclopedia of Witches, Witchcraft and Wicca that it was Zell's two wives, Morning Glory Zell and Diane Darling, who revived Green Egg at Beltane 1988. Morning Glory is credited with coining the term "polyamory", in an essay in Green Egg entitled "A Bouquet of Lovers". Once more it took its place as "a leading Pagan journal", according to Adler. Eventually Darling left, Zell-Ravenheart was ousted, and the magazine—thriving until 2001—folded again.

In March 2007, Green Egg was restarted as an ezine, available online at greeneggemagazine.com. In 2008, an anthology of art and articles was published, entitled Green Egg Omelette. In 2013, Green Egg announced a print on demand service, and was digitising its back catalog.

Oberon (formerly Otter) and Morning Glory Zell were the subjects of the book The Wizard and the Witch: Seven Decades of Counterculture, Magick & Paganism (2014), which includes a fuller story of Green Egg and the Church of All Worlds.

In spring 2020, Church of All Worlds resume online publication of Green Egg Magazine under the direction of Rev. Alder Moonoak.

== See also ==
- Harvest, a neopagan magazine
