= Old One =

Old One, Old Ones, Great Old One or Great Old Ones may refer to:

- The Great Old Ones, fictional Cthulhu Mythos deities in the works of H. P. Lovecraft
- The Elder Things, fictional Cthulhu Mythos creatures in the works of H. P. Lovecraft
- The Great Old Ones (Call of Cthulhu), an adventure supplement for the Call of Cthulhu role-playing game by Chaosium
- The Old One, a character in The Keys to the Kingdom
- "The Old One", an episode of Playdate (Canadian TV series)
- Old Ones (Palladium Books), a 1984 book written by Kevin Siembieda
- Old Ones (Buffy the Vampire Slayer), fictional demons in Buffy the Vampire Slayer
- Old Ones, mystical beings in The Dark Is Rising Sequence
- Old Ones, an ancient race of advanced, god-like aliens in the Warhammer Fantasy setting
- Old Ones or Elder Bairns, fictional creatures in Blood-C
- Old Ones, a race of gods in A Song of Ice and Fire

== See also ==
- Ancient One (disambiguation)
- Elder race, a fictional ancient race of beings
