= Exposition (narrative) =

Background information within a narrative

Narrative exposition, now often simply exposition, is the insertion of background information within a story or narrative. This information can be about the setting, characters' backstories, prior plot events, historical context, etc. In literature, exposition appears in the form of expository writing embedded within the narrative.

== Infodumping ==
An information dump (more commonly now, infodump) is a large drop of information by the author to provide background they deem necessary to continue the plot. This is ill-advised in narrative and is even worse when used in dialogue. There are cases where an information dump can work, but in many instances it slows down the plot or breaks immersion for the readers. Exposition works best when the author provides only the bare minimum of surface information and allows the readers to discover as they go.

== Indirect exposition/incluing ==
Indirect exposition, sometimes called incluing, is a technique of worldbuilding in which the reader is gradually exposed to background information about the world in which a story is set. The idea is to clue the readers in to the world the author is building without them being aware of it. This can be done in a number of ways: through dialogues, flashbacks, characters' thoughts, background details, in-universe media, or the narrator telling a backstory.

Indirect exposition has always occurred in storytelling incidentally, but is first clearly identified in the modern literary world, in the writing of Rudyard Kipling. In his stories set in India like The Jungle Book, Kipling was faced with the problem of Western readers not knowing the culture and environment of that land, so he gradually developed the technique of explaining through example. But this was relatively subtle, compared to Kipling's science fiction stories, where he used the technique much more obviously and necessarily, to explain an entirely fantastic world unknown to any reader, in his Aerial Board of Control universe, starting with the novella "With the Night Mail" (1905)

Kipling's writing influenced other science fiction writers, most notably the "Dean of Science Fiction", Robert Heinlein, who became known for his advanced rhetorical and storytelling techniques, including indirect exposition.

The word incluing is attributed to fantasy and science fiction author Jo Walton. She defined it as "the process of scattering information seamlessly through the text, as opposed to stopping the story to impart the information." "Information dump" (or info-dump) is the term given for overt exposition, which writers want to avoid. In an idiot lecture, characters tell each other information that needs to be explained for the purpose of the audience, but of which the characters in-universe would already be aware. Writers are advised to avoid writing dialogues beginning with "As you well know, Professor, a prime number is..."

== See also ==
- Show, don't tell
