= Marcus L. Rowland =

English role-playing game designer (born 1953)

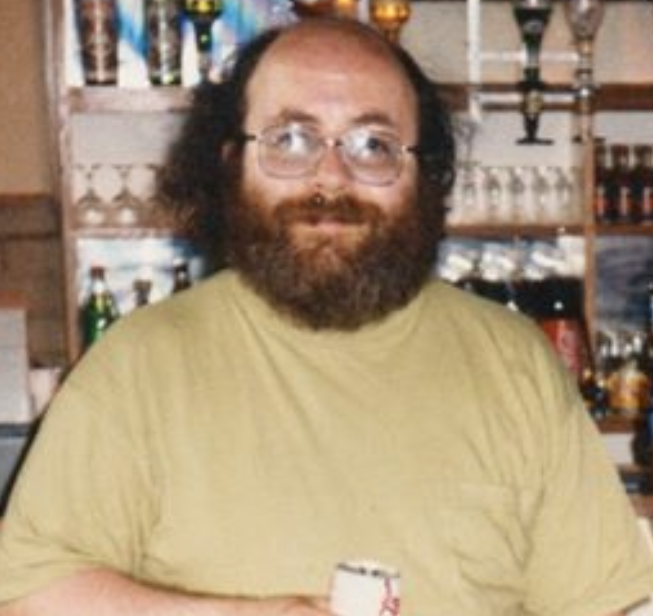
- Marcus L. Rowland at Convulsion '92.
- Born: 1953 (age 72–73); Hampstead, London
- Known for: Forgotten Futures
- Website: www.forgottenfutures.co.uk

Marcus L. Rowland (born 1953) is an English author in the field of role-playing games, particularly games with Victorian era content.

== Biography ==
Marcus Rowland owned a copy of the original boxed set of Dungeons & Dragons as early as 1977, then switched to Advanced Dungeons & Dragons (AD&D) in 1979 and started to act as Dungeon Master. Rowland had an interest in writing magazine articles — he had already written two articles about scientific photography for Amateur Photographer. After playing AD&D for a couple of years, he started to submit articles about role-playing games to hobby magazines, beginning with a variant character class for AD&D, the Detective, that appeared in the April–May 1981 edition (Issue #24) of White Dwarf. He became a frequent contributor to White Dwarf, Dungeon, Challenge, Different Worlds, The Space Gamer, and Dragon, starting with articles about AD&D, but quickly branching into Traveller, Call of Cthulhu, and Judge Dredd.

== Scenario and game design ==
Starting in 1985, Rowland began to write complete adventures and sourcebooks for various role-playing games, including seven adventures and sourcebooks for Call of Cthulhu (such as The Great Old Ones, 1989), Judge Dredd, GURPS Steam-Tech and Space: 1889. In 1990, Rowland wrote Canal Priests of Mars, a Space: 1889 adventure, for Game Designers Workshop (GDW), but objected when GDW cut 15,000 words from his 55,000 manuscript without consultation. At the same time, he was having trouble writing a large Call of Cthulhu adventure for Chaosium; he finally gave up on the project and voluntarily returned his advance.

The fate of these two projects caused Rowland to consider the idea of self-publishing. He had already written a few small computer programs as shareware, and reasoned that he could do the same thing with a role-playing game. The result, in 1993, was a new steampunk role-playing game, Forgotten Futures, the Role-playing Game of Scientific Romances, set in the early 21st-century utopia envisioned by Rudyard Kipling in his stories With the Night Mail and As Easy as ABC. Rather than selling the product to a publisher, Rowland released the game rules as shareware, initially on a 720-kilobyte floppy disk. This has been noted as an early example of independently published role-playing games, along with several other of his self-published works.

Rowland enjoyed enough success to expand the concept as technology advanced, adding HTML, switching to CD-ROMs, and eventually selling products via a website. From 1994 to 2010, a number of Forgotten Futures expansions followed. In addition, Rowland created the "Forgotten Future Library", an anthology of genre literature by George Griffith, Stanley G. Weinbaum, Rudyard Kipling, William Hope Hodgson, and other Victoria authors, as well as Victorian-era resources, including two world atlases from 1903 and 1913. His adaptation of Kipling's Aerial Board of Control setting has been described by scholars as "a remarkable piece of extrapolative worldbuilding".

== Other writing ==
Rowland has also written some short stories, "Frog Day Afternoon", "Playing Safe", and "The Missing Martian", published in the Midnight Rose collective's anthologies. He has also written for 2000 AD, New Scientist, and various computer magazines. He also contributed to articles on gaming in the second edition of The Encyclopedia of Science Fiction and the Encyclopedia of Fantasy. Extensive collections of his fanfiction can be found on Archive of Our Own and Twisting the Hellmouth.

== Works ==
- RPGs
  - Forgotten Futures (shareware release 1993 onwards)
    - Arcane Presents Forgotten Futures (Future Publishing 1997 – abridged version of rules)
    - Forgotten Futures (Heliograph Inc. 2000 ISBN 0-9668926-2-3 – expanded version of rules)
  - Diana: Warrior Princess (Heliograph Inc. 2003 ISBN 1-930658-13-3, PDF 2005)
  - The Original Flatland Role Playing Game (PDF 2006)
- Game Modules
  - Queen Victoria and the Holy Grail (Games Workshop 1985) – Golden Heroes
  - Trail of the Loathesome Slime (Games Workshop 1985) – Call of Cthulhu
  - Nightmare in Norway (Games Workshop 1985) – Call of Cthulhu
  - Do Troubleshooters Dream of Electric Sheep? (Games Workshop 1987) – Paranoia (2nd Edition)
  - Judgement Day (Games Workshop 1988) – Judge Dredd
  - Canal Priests of Mars (Game Designers Workshop 1990, abridged ISBN 1-55878-039-4) – Space 1889
    - Expanded as The Complete Canal Priests Of Mars (Heliograph Inc. 2009 ISBN 1-930658-11-7)
  - Log of the Astronef (Heliograph Inc. 2000 ISBN 0-9668926-4-X) – Forgotten Futures
  - Elvis: The Legendary Tours (For Diana: Warrior Princess, PDF publication 2006)
- Other works
  - Into the Detectives Casebook (Magellanica Company 1999) – card game
  - (ed) Stories of Other Worlds and A Honeymoon in Space by George Griffith (Heliograph Inc. 2000 ISBN 0-9668926-3-1)
  - (ed) Tsar Wars Episode One: Angel of the Revolution by George Griffith (Heliograph Inc. 2003 ISBN 1-930658-16-8)
  - (ed) Tsar Wars Episode Two: Syren of the Skies by George Griffith (Heliograph Inc. 2003 ISBN 1-930658-17-6)
- Contributions
  - Judge Dredd Companion (Games Workshop 1987 – Judge Dredd)
  - The Great Old Ones (Chaosium Inc. 1989 – for Call of Cthulhu)
  - Blood Brothers (Chaosium Inc. 1990 – for Call of Cthulhu)
  - Fearful Passages (Chaosium Inc. 1992 – for Call of Cthulhu)
  - Blood Brothers 2 (Chaosium Inc. 1992 – for Call of Cthulhu)

=== Diana: Warrior Princess ===
Diana: Warrior Princess
- Designers: Marcus L. Rowland
- Publishers: Heliograph Incorporated
- Publication: 2003
- Genres: Comic historical fantasy
- Systems: Custom

Diana: Warrior Princess is an indie role-playing game written by Rowland and initially published by Heliograph Incorporated, based on an article describing the setting which originally appeared in Valkyrie magazine. It is distributed as a PDF via Steve Jackson Games. It describes a fictionalised version of the twentieth century as it might be seen a few thousand years from now.

The game is a parody of Xena: Warrior Princess, and its setting tries to mock Xena’s seen inaccuracy to Ancient Greece by applying historical inaccuracies to the twentieth century. Historical figures are distorted and confused with each other. Diana, Princess of Wales rides around in shining white motorcycle leathers on a semi-sentient motorcycle, doing battle with the war-god, Landmines, and "Bonnie Prince" Charlie, from whom she took her mystic powers of royalty.

Diana is aided by Fergie, the barbarian "Red Ken" and "Wild Bill" Gates, while Tony the Vampire Slayer battles the sorceress Thatcher and her masked assassin Archer. The milieu also includes figures who lived before the twentieth century such as Emperor Norton, Queen Victoria and the "disease" lepus (described as a scriptwriting error since lepus is actually a reference to rabbits and not leprosy as the scriptwriter intended)

There is one supplement, entitled Elvis: the Legendary Tours, published as a PDF only. Set in the same world as Diana: Warrior Princess but focusing on the United States, it describes the exploits of the legendary bard Elvis (no surname is given) and his attempts to return home to the magical Land of Grace, which is currently ruled by his evil brother Abbot Costello. He is aided in this quest by the "Mystic Power of Music" and companions including barbarian bass player John Lenin, guitarist 'Senator' Joe McCartney, mystic roadie Bob 'The Builder' Marley, frontier law-woman and medic Billie 'Doc' Holliday, and martial artist and shaman Jean Claude Van Halen. The setting is an anachronistic America split into several rival states; Norton's Empire (ruled by Emperor Norton), Martin Luther's kingdom (a theocracy) and a military dictatorship run by demagogue Uncle Sam and his so-called sons, nephews, and other lieutenants; other areas include Indian Territory (complete with Sikhs and elephants) and dozens of small kingdoms and independent states.

Elvis: The Legendary Tours was one of several spin-off series mentioned in the original game; others included Parton: Lust For Glory, a military adventure series; Toni the Vampire Slayer, in which teenager Toni Blair fought the undead; Gandhi's Angels, a martial arts detective series; and Richard of Holly wood, a Robin Hood parody in which Richard Nixon battles the evil Uncle Sam. In a LiveJournal entry Rowland stated that he does not plan to write Parton: Lust For Glory; the other settings were not mentioned. Subsequent entries have included a cover design for Gandhi's Angels, and more recently several entries discussing Fanfic: The Role-Playing Game, a possible future project based on a variant of the Diana: Warrior Princess rules.
