= Blood Brothers (Call of Cthulhu) =

Tabletop horror role-playing game supplement

13 Tales of Terror
- Cover by Lee Gibbons
- Designers: Keith Herber; Sam Shirley; Kevin A. Ross; Gregory Dewiler; John B. Monroe; John Scott Clegg; Geoff Gillon; Marcus L. Rowland; Tony Hickie; Michael Szymanski; Scott Aniolowski; Fred Behrendt; Barbara Manui; Chris Adams
- Publishers: Chaosium
- Publication: 1990; 36 years ago
- Genres: Horror
- Systems: Basic Role-Playing
- ISBN: 0-933635-69-9

Blood Brothers is a light-hearted anthology of short adventures published by Chaosium in 1990 for the Lovecraftian horror role-playing game Call of Cthulhu.

== Contents ==
The book is an anthology of thirteen short adventures that use themes, characters or monsters from classic B movie horror films: vampires based on Bela Lugosi's 1931 portrayal of Dracula; werewolves similar to Lon Chaney Jr.'s 1941 Wolf Man; zombies similar to those in George A. Romero's Dawn of the Dead; cavemen and dinosaurs from 1975's The Land That Time Forgot; gremlins akin to those in 1984's Gremlins; and a killer alien from 1979's Alien.

Players are offered a variety of one-shot characters. In keeping with the light-hearted B-movie theme, the usual Sanity check in the Call of Cthulhu rules has been tweaked so that a character who fails a Sanity check, rather than developing psychoses or phobias, instead screams, or falls down in the path of an approaching monster, or faints.

== Publication history ==
Blood Brothers, a 128-page softcover book, was the first supplement that Chaosium published for Call of Cthulhu. The thirteen adventures were written by Keith Herber, Sam Shirley, Kevin Ross, Gregory W. Detwiler, Ben Monroe, Scott Clegg, Geoff Gillan, Barbara Manui, Chris Adams, Marcus L. Rowland, Tony Hickie, Michael Szymanski, Scott Aniolowski, and Fred Behrendt. Earl Geier produced the interior art, and the cover art was by Lee Gibbons.

Two years after publication of Blood Brothers, Chaosium followed up with a sequel, Blood Brothers 2, featuring nine more movie-themed Call of Cthulhu adventures.

== Reception ==
Wayne Ligon reviewed Blood Brothers in White Wolf #25 (Feb./March, 1991), rating it a 3 out of 5 and stated that "any supplement that includes Abbot and Costello as replacement PC's, has titles like 'Ancient Midget Nazi Shamans,' and recommends the infamous 'Dr. Tongue' method of stimulating 3-D movies, deserves a place on any gamer's shelf."

In the November 1991 edition of Dragon (Issue #175), Allen Varney enjoyed the humour of the product, saying, "This supplement highlights a surprising and welcome turn in our hobby: the impish sense of humor in the field's leading horror game... that fine tap dance on the line between horror and comedy."
