= Ancient One (disambiguation) =

The Ancient One is a comic book character, the mentor of Doctor Strange.

Ancient One may also refer to:

- Ancient One (Marvel Cinematic Universe), the film version of the comics character
- Kennewick Man, a prehistoric Paleoamerican man, known as the Ancient One by several Native American tribes
- The Ancient One, a character from Ronin Warriors
- The Ancient One (novel), a 1992 novel by T. A. Barron
- "The Ancient One" (Teenage Mutant Ninja Turtles), a 2005 episode of Teenage Mutant Ninja Turtles (2003 TV series) (season 4)
- The Ancient One, a nickname for Abraham Lincoln, the sixteenth president of United States

== See also ==
- Old One (disambiguation)
