= Nightmare in Norway =

Call of Cthulhu adventure

- Cover art by Lee Gibbons
- Designers: Marcus L. Rowland
- Publishers: Games Workshop
- Publication: 1985; 40 years ago
- Genres: Fantasy Horror
- Systems: Basic Role-Playing

Nightmare in Norway is an adventure published under license by Games Workshop in 1985 for Chaosium's horror role-playing game Call of Cthulhu.

== Plot summary ==
In 1925, a British officer and World War I veteran, Lieutenant Cleary, is killed while on a Norwegian ski holiday, his body ravaged by wolves. Now someone is trying to blackmail his family, suggesting Cleary had been having an affair in Norway. The Investigators are hired by Cleary's cousin to find what happened in Norway and who is behind the blackmail threats. The Investigators must travel to Norway, where they will find themselves isolated and under attack by a mysterious new supernatural nemesis.

== Publication history ==
Nightmare in Norway is a 36-page softcover book with player handouts that was written by Marcus L. Rowland, with interior art by Tony Ackland and Charles Elliot, and cover art by Lee Gibbons. It was published in 1985 by Games Workshop for the second edition of Call of Cthulhu under a license granted by Chaosium.

== Reception ==
In the February 1986 edition of White Dwarf (Issue #74), Pete Tamlyn called this "A classic detective story setting in which the who that dunnit may be better left undisturbed." Tamlyn also complimented the book's many blind alleys and red herrings, saying, "the collection of sub-plots involving the various characters is in true Agatha Christie tradition. It's all very devious." He worried that the Investigators' inability to speak Norwegian to the locals would hamper the investigation, and complained "that the scenario is too short. I feel that much more could have been made of the various sub-plots and an enterprising GM could still do so." Despite this, Tamlyn gave the book an above average rating of 8 out of 10, saying, "Overall well worth it if you think your players can handle Norway."

== Reviews ==
- Dagon (Issue 11 - Jan 1986)
