= Henry Reuterdahl =

Swedish-American painter

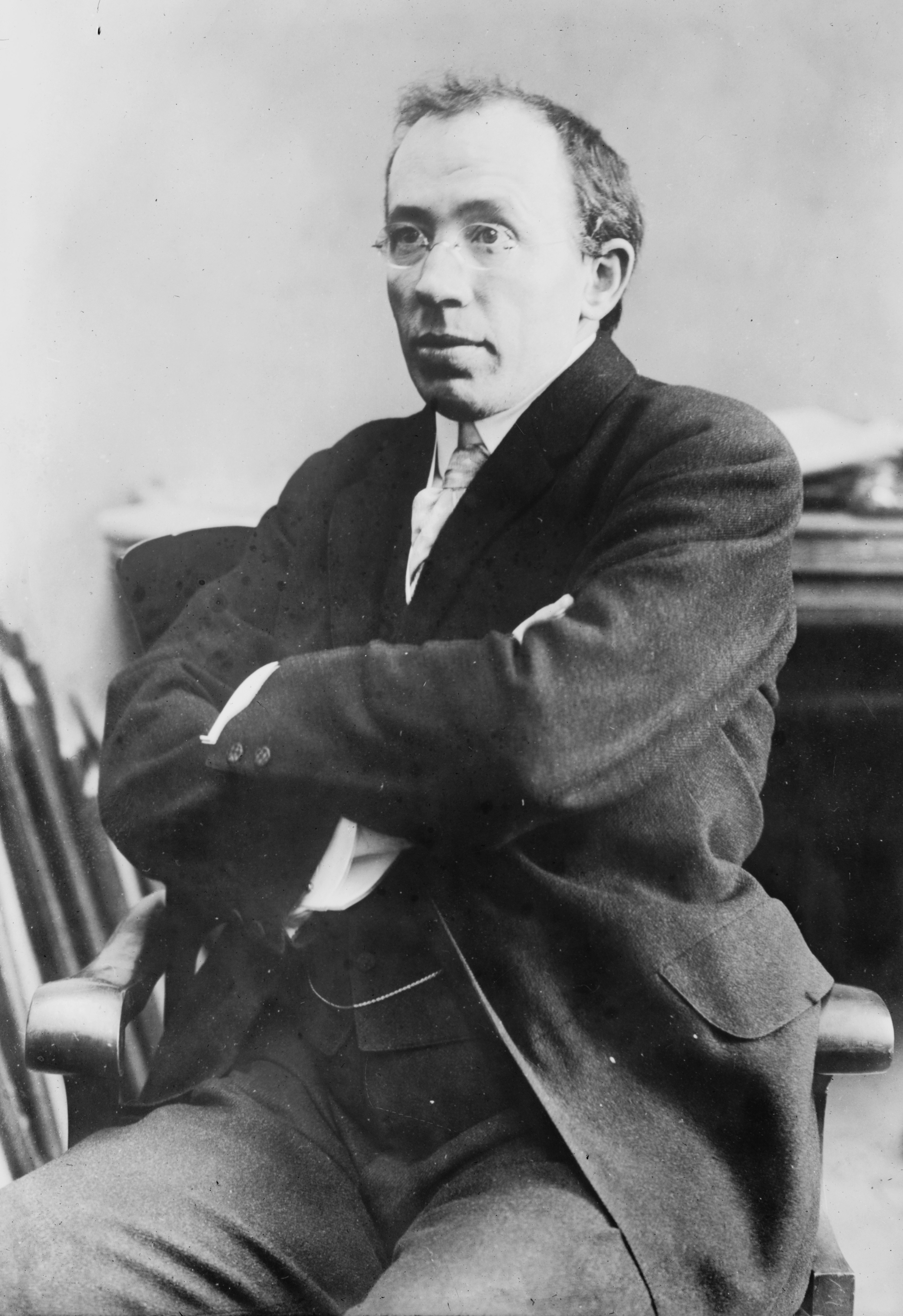
- Born: August 12, 1870; Malmö, Sweden
- Died: December 21, 1925 (aged 55); Washington, D.C., United States
- Known for: Painting, sketching

Henry Reuterdahl (August 12, 1870 (Note: Some sources incorrectly list his birth date as August 30, 1871, but the date shown in this article comes from his birth record.) – December 21, 1925) was a Swedish-American painter highly acclaimed for his nautical artwork. He had a long relationship with the United States Navy.

In addition to serving as a Lieutenant Commander in the United States Naval Reserve Force, he was selected by President Theodore Roosevelt to accompany the Great White Fleet voyage in 1907 to document the journey. In addition to his artwork, he was a frequent writer on naval topics, and served as an editor of Jane's Fighting Ships.

== Early life ==
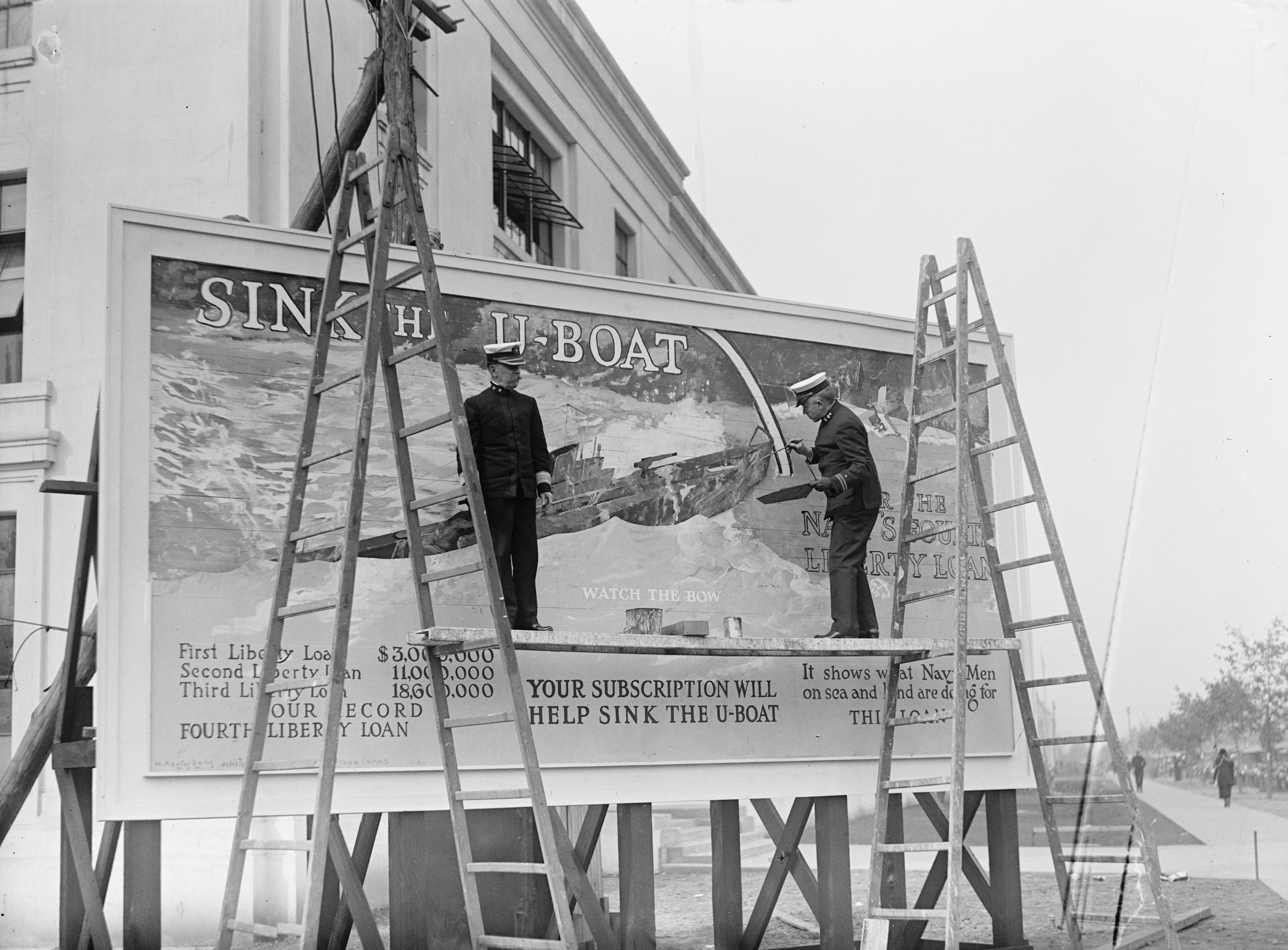
As Rear Admiral Cowie (left) looks on, Reuterdahl creates a mural for the Fourth Liberty Loan publicity campaign that includes a mechanically animated U-boat (1918)

Reuterdahl was born in Malmö, Sweden. He received his academic education in Stockholm. He taught himself to draw, and in 1893 was commissioned to do illustrations of the World's Fair in Chicago. He decided to remain in the United States, and after his 1899 marriage to Pauline Stephenson of Chicago, he made his home in Weehawken, New Jersey. Although he never had any formal training in art, the self-taught Reuterdahl won a job as an illustrator-correspondent during the Spanish–American War. In the years prior to World War I, he traveled extensively with the Navy and became their official artist during the war, where he was head of the poster bureau. At that time, he was considered America's foremost naval artist.

== Controversial article ==
As a civilian, he was both enamored by and critical of the Navy. In January 1908, an article of his was published in McClure's that bluntly criticized the design of the Navy's battleships and blamed the errors on naval bureaucracy, whose "nature compels it to perpetuate mistakes". This was essentially a summary of his close friend William Sims's opinions, who had hoped to create enough of a controversy to force reforms in the Navy, namely the end of bureaucratic control over battleship technology and the establishment of promotion system based on ability.

The article had a major impact, causing much consternation among not only the military, but in a large number of newspapers across the country as well. This was published after the Great White Fleet had already departed with Reuterdahl as a participant and when he left the fleet at Callao, Peru because of a serious illness in his family, it was falsely reported he was expelled from the journey.

The article itself did eventually accomplish Sims's goals. In February 1908, the United States Senate ordered an investigation into the problems brought to light in the article. Five years later, after much effort spearheaded by Sims and Stephen B. Luce, Congress authorized a reorganization of the Department of the Navy.

== Later life ==
As an artist, Reuterdahl was a member of the Society of Illustrators and the American Watercolor Society. He exhibited his work in the 1913 Armory Show, although he was not considered a modernist. He also taught at the Art Students League of New York. In World War I, he and other members of the Society of Illustrators were recruited to the Division of Pictorial Publicity of the Committee on Public Information to make propaganda posters for the U.S. government.

In September 1925, Reuterdahl was admitted to St. Elizabeths Government Hospital for the Insane where he died three months later. He is buried in Arlington National Cemetery.

== Gallery ==
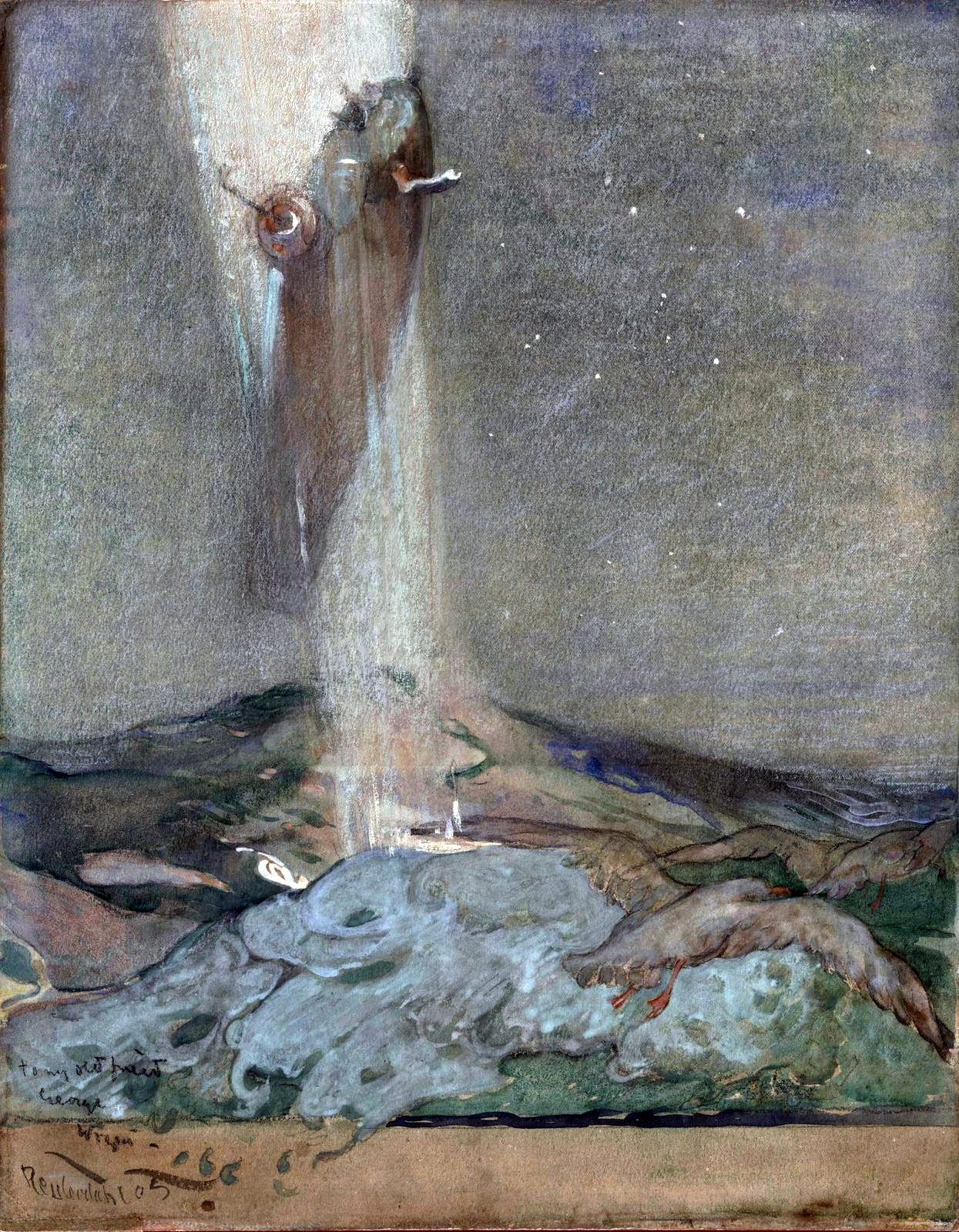
Signed illustration for Rudyard Kipling's science fiction story "With the Night Mail" (2005)

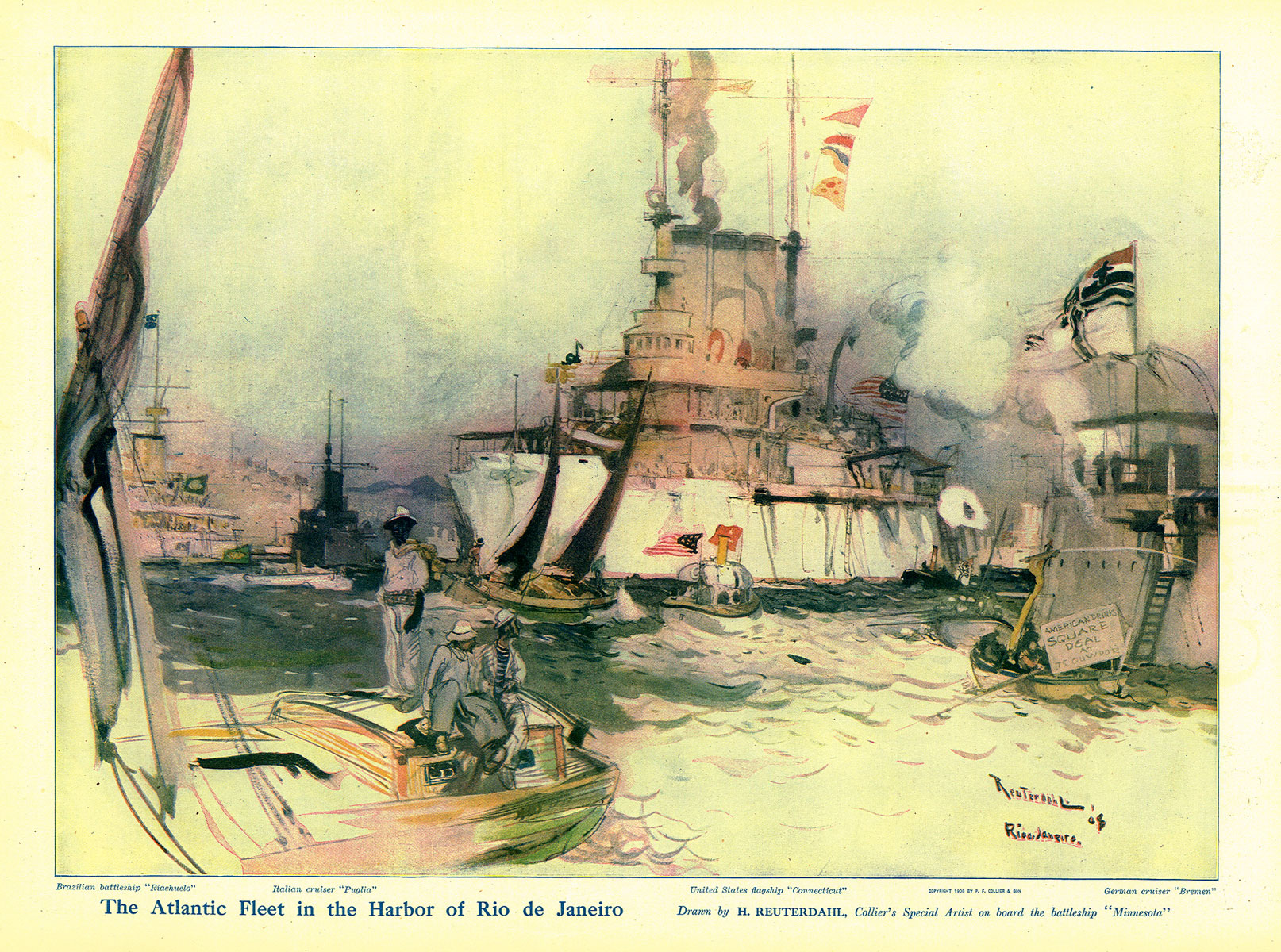
The Atlantic Fleet in the Harbor of Rio de Janeiro, as part of the Great White Fleet expedition (1907)

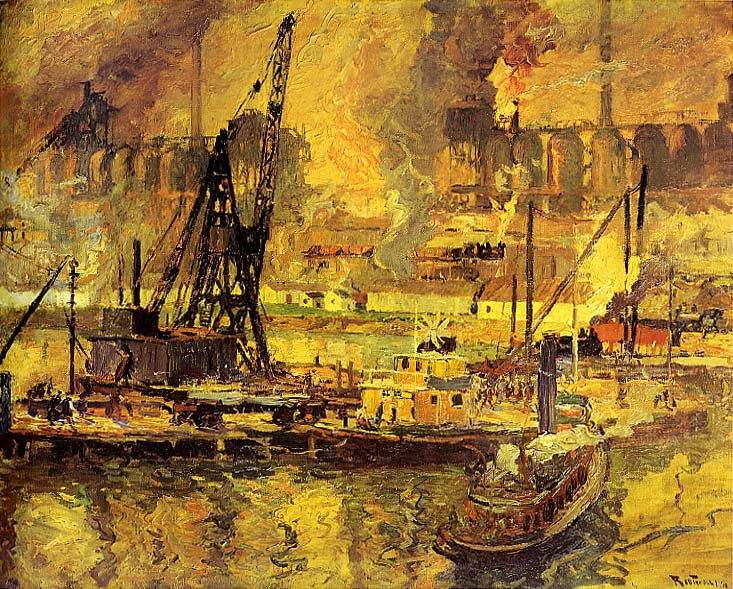
Blast Furnaces (1912), exhibited at the Armory Show

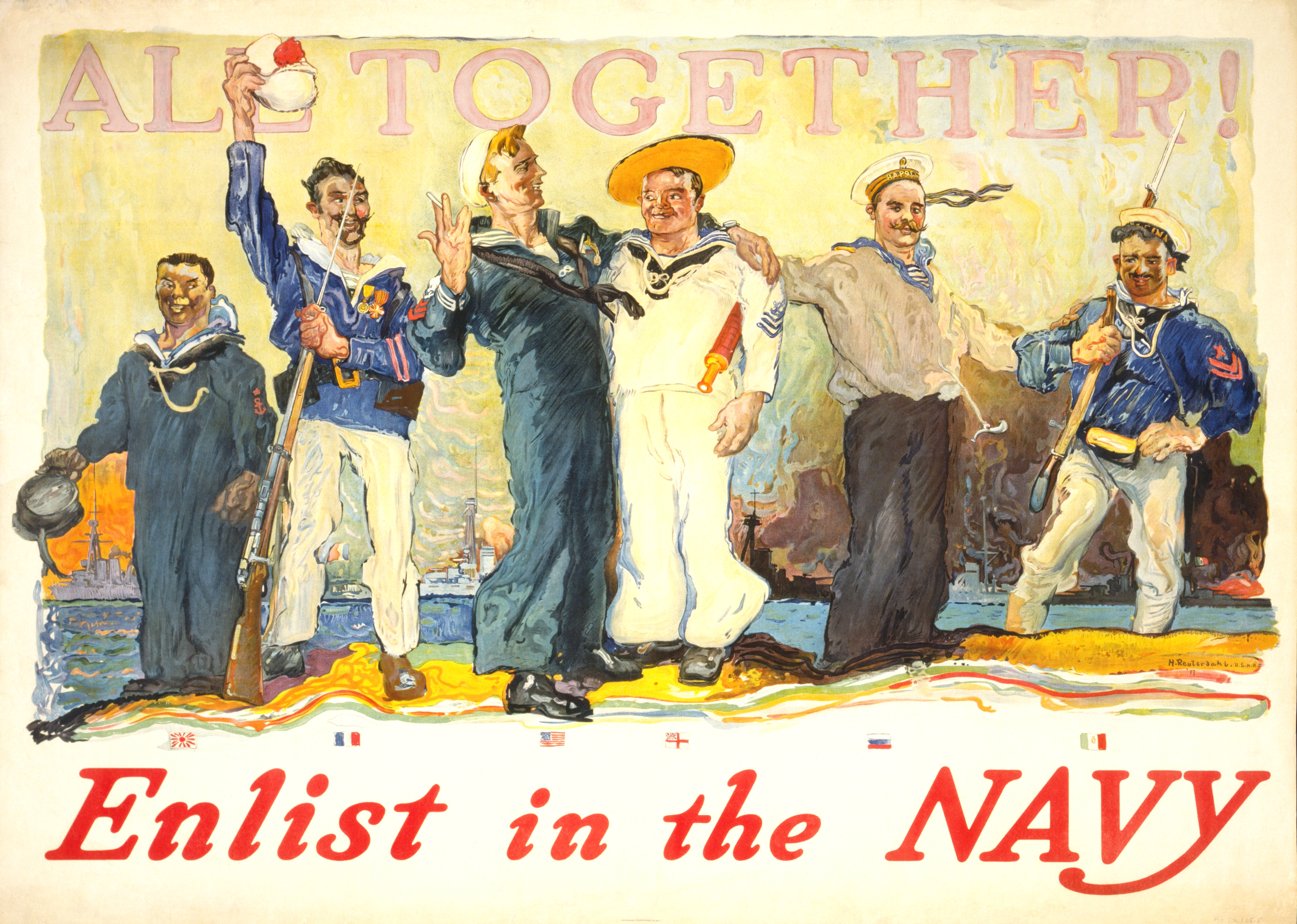
Naval recruitment poster (1917)

== See also ==
- Antonio Jacobsen
- Willy Stöwer
- William Frederick Mitchell
- Burnell Poole
