= With the Night Mail =

1905 science fiction novella by Rudyard Kipling

With the Night Mail – A Story of 2000 A.D.
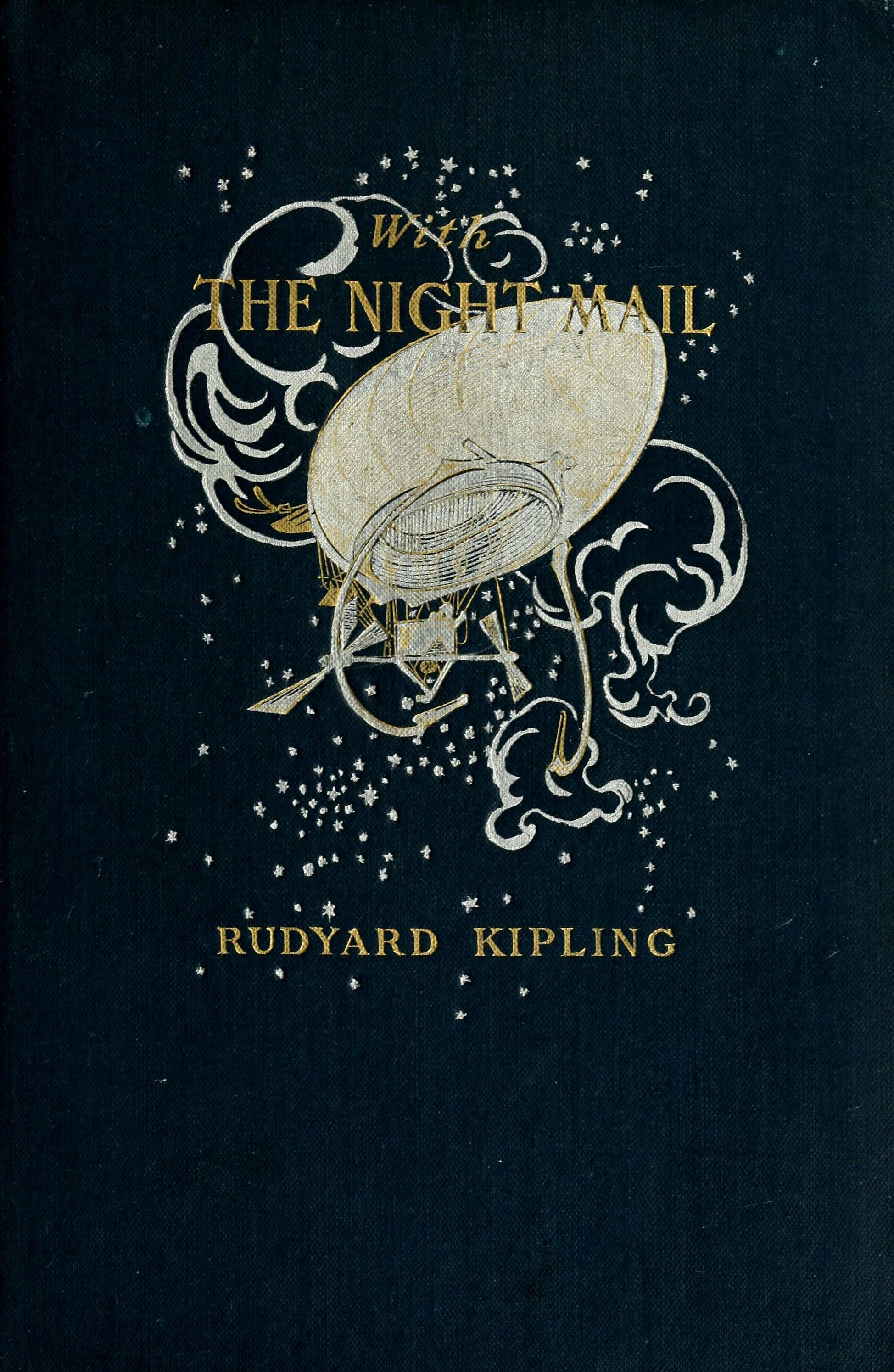
- Cover of the book
- Author: Rudyard Kipling
- Illustrator: Frank Xavier Leyendecker, Henry Reuterdahl
- Language: English
- Series: Aerial Board of Control
- Subject: mail, aeronautics, rescue
- Genre: science fiction
- Set in: 2000 A.D.
- Published: March 1909
- Publisher: Doubleday, Page & Company
- Publication place: US
- Media type: Serialization (1905), Book (1909)
- Followed by: "As Easy As A.B.C."

"With the Night Mail" is a 1905 science fiction novella by Rudyard Kipling.

== Setting ==
The story is set in the early 21st century and describes the Aerial Board of Control, a fictional supranational organization dedicated to the control and aid of airship traffic across the whole world. Kipling later elaborated this story element in the longer sequel story, "As Easy as ABC", set in the same universe.

== Plot ==
A postal worker makes a night run to Quebec on the airship (dirigible) Postal Packet 162 with captain Purnall and his crew.

During the run, they encounter another airship in the lane reserved for mail but that is losing altitude. A mark boat is called for assistance, but it responds it cannot quit station. Purnall convinces the skipper of the failing ship that the ship must be abandoned, and they witness the rescue operation carried out by a planet liner that has answered a general call and risen to the reserved lane. After the evacuation, the 162 attend to the now rapidly falling derelict by illuminating it, thus warning nearby ships of it.

After seeing the derelict fall into the ocean, the mark boat warns them of an approaching storm and advises them to steer towards Greenland. But the 162 instead holds course and steers right into a heavy storm, described by Kipling as "We were dragged hither and yon by warm or frozen suctions, belched up on the tops of wulli-was, spun down by vortices and clubbed aside by laterals under a dizzying rush of stars in the company of a drunken moon." By skillful navigation of crew member Tim, they ride out the storm and then exchange some words with A.B.C. man Williams on the mark boat.

Back en route to Quebec, Tim slides open the aft colloid to reveal the dawn and the sunrise. They witness a hospital boat, believed to be bound for Frederikshavn or one of the Glacier sanatoriums, and enjoy its morning hymn.

They arrive at their destination and Tim introduces the postman to his maiden, telling her that he has invited Williams from the Mark Boat to tea on Friday.

== Publication ==
It was first published in McClure's Magazine in November 1905, and then in The Windsor Magazine in December 1905. In 1909 it was issued as a popular book by Doubleday, Page & Company, slightly revised and with additional poetry and faux advertisements and notices from the future. It later appeared in the Kipling story collection Actions and reactions (1909).

== Illustrations ==
Description of the engine

From the low-arched expansion-tanks on either side the valves descend pillarwise to the turbine-chests, and thence the obedient gas whirls through the spirals of blades with a force that would whip the teeth out of a power-saw. Behind, is its own pressure held in leash or spurred on by the lift-shunts; before it, the vacuum where Fleury's Ray dances in violet-green bands and whirled turbillions of flame. The jointed U-tubes of the vacuum-chamber are pressure-tempered colloid (no glass would endure the strain for an instant) and a junior engineer with tinted spectacles watches the Ray intently. It is the very heart of the machine—a mystery to this day. Even Fleury who begat it [...] could not explain how [it works] [...] If a speck of oil, if even the natural grease of the human finger touch the hooded terminals Fleury's Ray will wink and disappear and must be laboriously built up again. This means half a day's work for all hands and an expense of one hundred and seventy-odd pounds to the G. P. O. for radium-salts and such trifles.

— Rudyard Kipling, "With the Night Mail" (£170 in 1905 is equivalent to £17,872 in 2025)

The story was illustrated by Frank X. Leyendecker, Henry Reuterdahl, and Henry Wright.

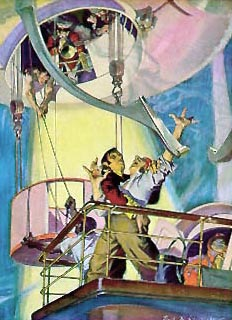
Rescue performed by a planet dirigible liner

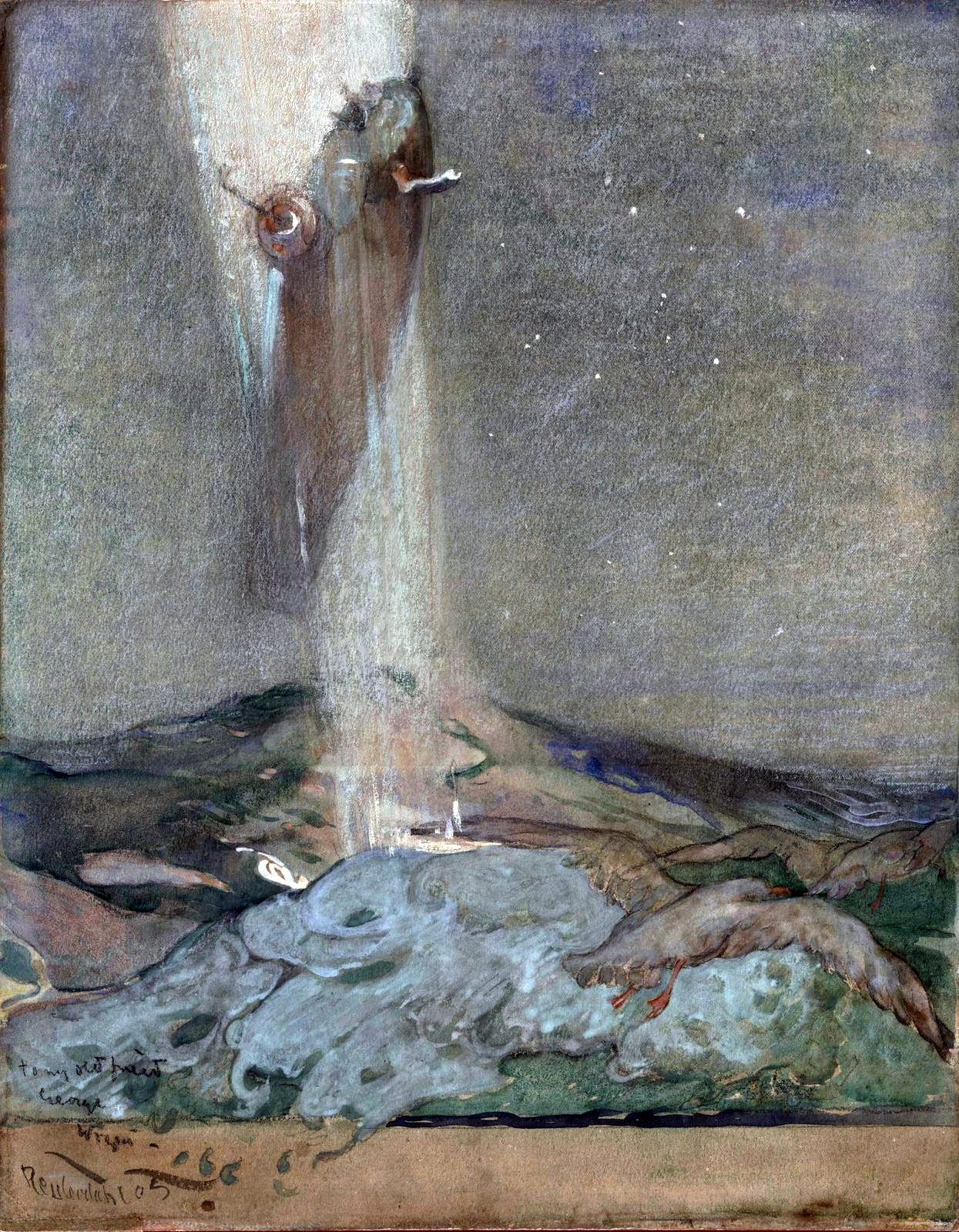
An illustration by Henry Reuterdahl

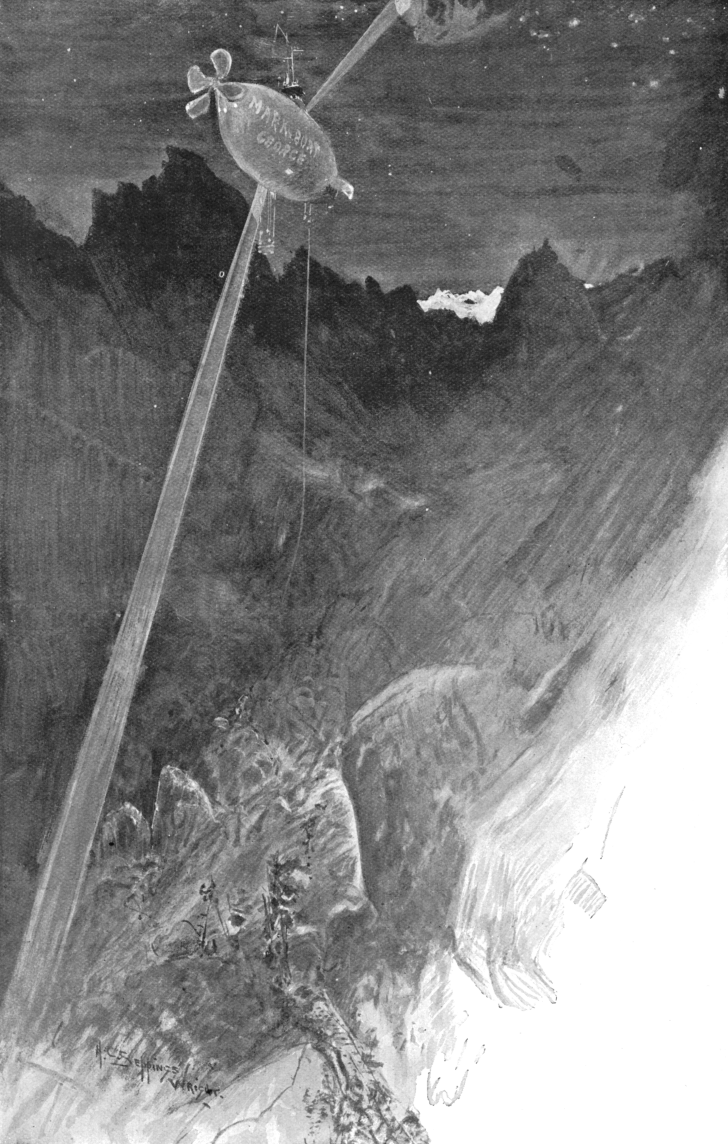
A mark boat which helped other airships during the storm

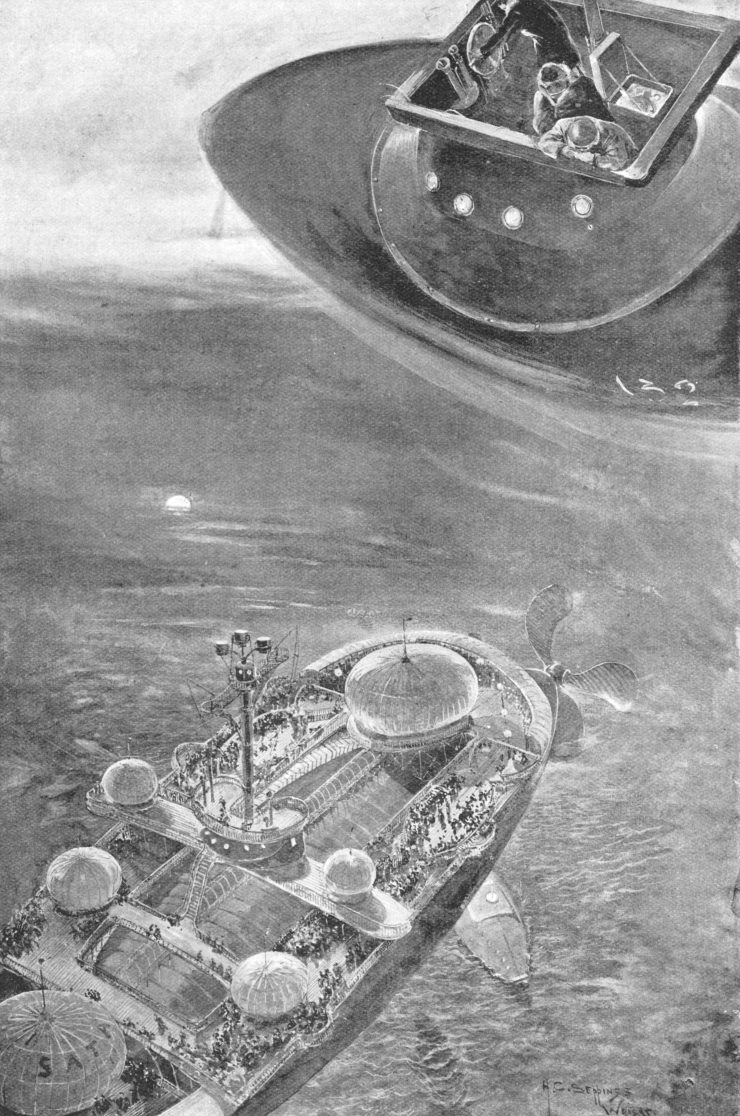
A hospital boat encountered during the run

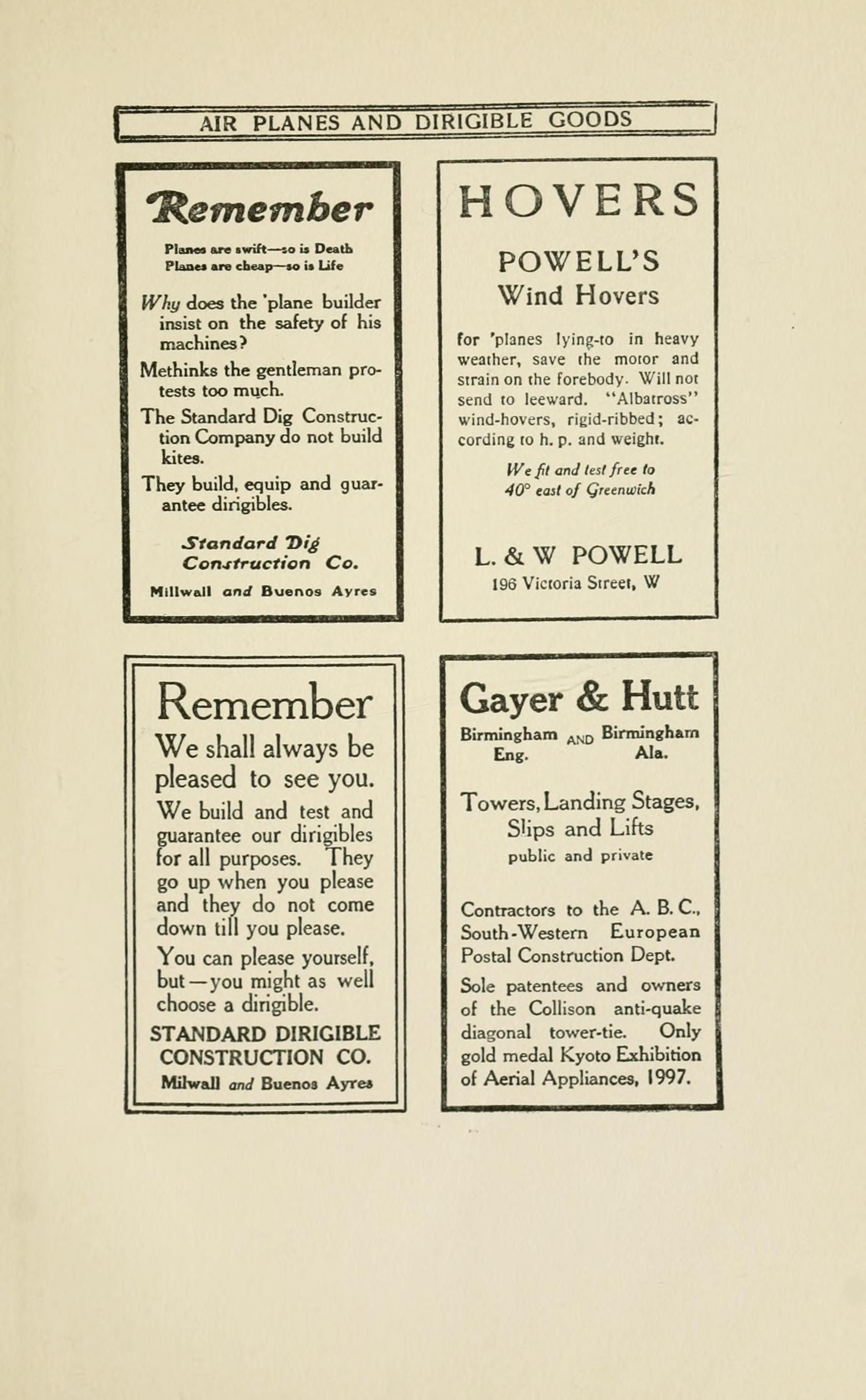
Faux ads accompanying the story

== Impact ==
The overall theme strongly anticipated the much later genre of steampunk, with touches of valvepunk in the radium-sourced method of airship propulsion. Kipling's two A.B.C. stories have also been held up as the first examples of the use in science fiction of force-fields, streamed data-recording to tape, and the immense pulsing 'cloud-breaker' navigation beams that guide the world's airships can be seen as anticipating the laser. Charles Carrington researched the radio technology of the time, and found that - even though there was then "no radio-telephony" - Kipling's story had envisioned complex air-traffic control by radio as... "a world-wide network of radio services, supplying weather forecasts, and allotting safety-levels, and landing priorities, thirty years before anyone else had dreamed of 'flying control'".

In terms of influence on other writers of the pre-war era the initial story pre-dates H.G. Wells's The War in the Air (1908) by three years, and presents a far more optimistic vision of the future. More generally the concept that air traffic would become widely used, and that some rational and impartial supra-national control of it was needed, is one that became a staple of pulp and 'scientifiction' as flight took wing in the 1930s.

The innovative approach of the "Night Mail" story, termed "indirect exposition" (or "incluing"), strongly influenced the style of the later post-war science-fiction author Robert A. Heinlein.

The tales inspired a substantial role-playing game, Forgotten Futures, which had as its first source book The A.B.C. Files: A Role Playing Sourcebook For Kipling's Scientific Romance (1998). This is currently free and has a technical glossary and timeline drawn from the stories.

== Artifacts ==
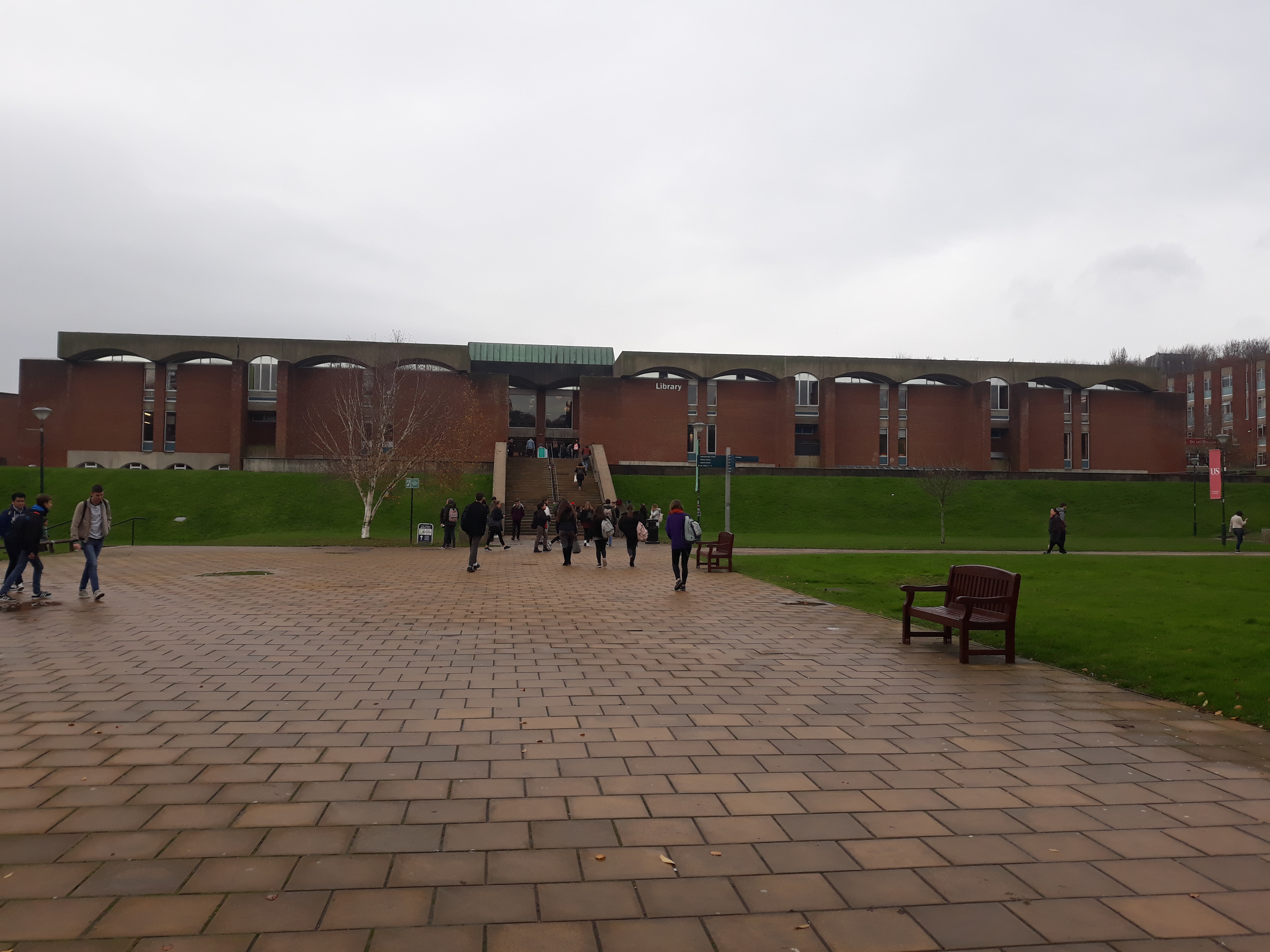
The University of Sussex library acquired a corrected typescript of "With the Night Mail" at an auction at Chichester, England in November 1997.

The corrected typescript of "With the Night Mail" was acquired at auction by the University of Sussex library in 1997.

== Adaptations ==
Marcus L. Rowland created a role-playing game series. The first entry was Forgotten Futures I: The A.B.C. Files first released in 1993. It uses the shareware approach, and the whole series is available for download.

American series Radio Tales published a radio drama, "Chicago 2065", which was an adaptation of "With the Night Mail" and "As Easy as A.B.C.". It was first broadcast on 23 October 2001 via National Public Radio.
