= William Frederick Mitchell =

English painter

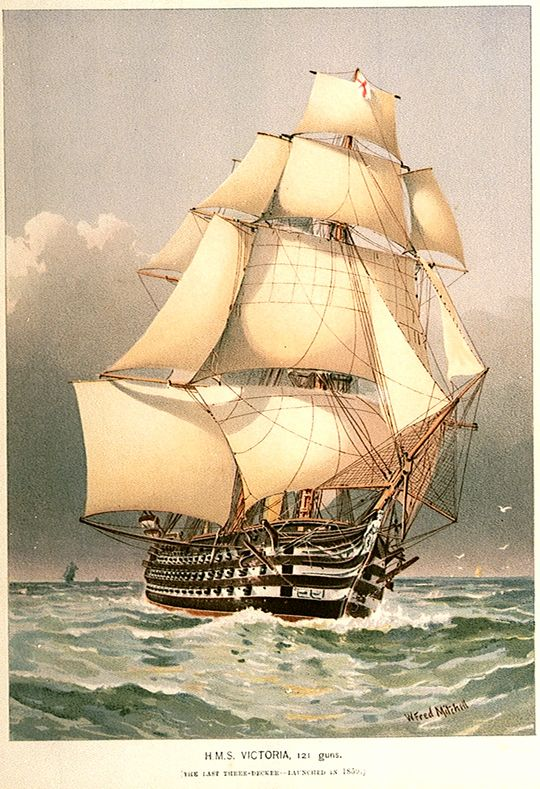
Collotype of HMS Victoria

William Frederick Mitchell (Calshot, 1845–1914, Ryde, Isle of Wight) was a British artist commissioned to paint many naval and merchant ships.

Mitchell's collected works were originally published in The Royal Navy in a series of illustrations. Many are in the National Maritime Museum Collection in Greenwich, England. Mitchell lived most of his life near Portsmouth and painted pictures of Royal Navy and merchant ships for their officers and owners. He also illustrated Brassey's Naval Annual. Mitchell's works are numbered and run to more than 3,500. His medium was principally watercolour but he painted some oils as well.

Mitchell wrote a short autobiography for the 1904 May/June issue of The Messenger, a magazine for deaf people, in which he describes how scarlet fever deprived him of his hearing but at home his father, an HM Coastguard stationed at Calshot Castle, taught him to speak. The autobiography relates his move to Ryde on the Isle of Wight, shortly after marriage to Miss Woodman in 1881. It also claims Queen Victoria, Edward, Prince of Wales, the German Emperor, and the Grand Duke Michael Mikhailovich of Russia among Mitchell's patrons.

== See also ==
- Antonio Jacobsen
- Willy Stöwer
- Henry Reuterdahl
