= Blood Brothers 2 =

Tabletop horror role-playing game supplement

9 Glimpses of Horror
- Cover by Lee Gibbons
- Designers: Geoff Gillan; Kathy Ho; Marcus L. Rowland; John B. Monroe; Scott David Aniolowski; Lynn Willis; Penelope Love; Mark Grundy; Kevin A. Ross; Steve Kluskens; Richard Watts
- Publishers: Chaosium
- Publication: 1992; 34 years ago
- Genres: Horror
- Systems: Basic Role-Playing
- ISBN: 0-933635-91-5

Blood Brothers 2 is an anthology of short adventures published by Chaosium in 1992 for the Lovecraftian horror role-playing game Call of Cthulhu.

== Contents ==
Blood Brothers 2 is a sequel to the anthology Blood Brothers published by Chaosium in 1990. Like the first book, Blood Brothers 2 is an anthology of nine short adventures that are based on themes, monsters and plots taken from classic B movies. The adventures include references to Gidget, High Plains Drifter, and Mexican lucha libre wrestlers.

== Reception ==
In the November 1992 edition of Dragon (Issue 187), Allen Varney enjoyed the generous serving of B-movie humor, saying, "Cue the theremin!"

Wayne Ligon reviewed Blood Brothers 2 in White Wolf #35 (March/April, 1993), rating it a 4 out of 5 and stated that "All of the scenarios here provide lots of spirited film fun, and I heartly recommend BB2."

== Reviews ==
- Abyss Quarterly #50 (Winter, 1992)
