= The Great Old Ones (Call of Cthulhu) =

Role-playing game

New Adventures Against the Cthulhu Mythos
- Cover by Tom Sullivan.
- Designers: Marcus L. Rowland; Kevin A. Ross; Harry Cleaver; Doug Lyons; L.N. Isinwyll
- Publishers: Chaosium
- Publication: 1989, 2004 (PDF)
- Genres: Horror
- Systems: Basic Role-Playing
- ISBN: 0-933635-38-9

The Great Old Ones is a collection of adventures published by Chaosium in 1989 for the horror role-playing game Call of Cthulhu. It won an Origins Award for "Best Roleplaying Adventure."

== Description ==
The Great Old Ones is a book of six loosely connected adventure scenarios involving some of the Cthulhu-mythos Elder Gods:

- "The Spawn", set in New Mexico, involving the disappearance of a labour organizer.
- "Still Waters", a haunted house adventure.
- "Tell Me, Have You See the Yellow Sign", set in New Orleans during Mardi Gras, based on Robert W. Chambers's Yellow Sign.
- "One in Darkness" mixes 1920s gangsters with horror.
- "The Pale God", based on the short story Before the Storm by Ramsey Campbell.
- "Bad Moon Rising", set in England.

None of the adventures is linked to the other adventures, so the referee can choose to present the adventures as six stand-alone sessions, or find a way to link them together. The book contains 25 pages of handouts to give to players as well as character sheets for Call of Cthulhu in Japanese, French, German, and Spanish.

== Publication history ==
The horror role-playing game Call of Cthulhu was published by Chaosium in 1981, and many adventures followed, including The Great Old Ones, a 176-page perfect-bound book created by Marcus L. Rowland, Kevin A. Ross, Harry Cleaver, Doug Lyons, and L.N. Isinwyll, with art by Tom Sullivan.

== Reception ==
In the September–October 1989 edition of Games International (Issue #9), Paul Mason warned readers that none of the scenarios were thematically linked, and were designed "for players who don't mind having their actions relatively circumscribed." He was disappointed in the artwork, calling it "distinctly below par." Mason was not impressed with any of the scenarios except "Bad Moon Rising", accusing the book of oversaturating the horror of Lovecraft. He concluded by giving the book an average rating of 3 out of 5, saying, "There is plenty of inventiveness here, but little originality [...] As it is, it'll satisfy diehards who are used to the standard Cthulhu plots, but only "Bad Moon Rising" will hold any appeal for more casual gamers."

In Issue 44 of Abyss, Dave Nalle called this a "beautifully produced, soft-bound book with an awesome color cover and excellent interior illustrations by Tom Sullivan." Nalle noted that the six adventures were "considerably more detailed and extensive than in previous Call of Cthulhu anthologies, though at times it seems like the authors are trying to fill space by going into detail which could easily be filled in by a gamemaster or imaginative players." Nalle gave his reactions to each adventure:

- The Spawn: "A good adventure, with a nice mix of both mundane and supernatural perils, and could easily be fit into most campaigns."
- Still Waters: "A fairly well executed but very traditional adventure."
- Tell Me, Have You Seen the Yellow Sign: "It features good use of sub-plots and distracting events like Mardi Gras."
- One in the Darkness: "The supernatural elements are refreshingly understated and it is just the right length for one-shot play."
- The Pale God: "A nice change from the usual unstoppable Cthulhu creatures, but still formidable in their numbers."
- Bad Moon Rising: "An interesting mixed-genre piece, crossing over into science fiction. Things get a bit too wild with the addition of a Cthulian time machine at the end. This is the most extensive and unusual adventure in the collection."

Nalle concluded, "All of the adventures in The Great Old Ones are of relatively high quality."

In the June 1990 edition of Dragon (Issue #158), Jim Bambra thought that "the strength of this book comes from the variety of adventures available." Bambra liked the first adventure ("The Spawn") because it mixes 1920s politics with horror. He was less pleased with the second adventure ("Still Waters"), saying, "Once you played one spooky house, you've played them all." He liked the New Orleans setting of "Tell Me Have You Seen The Yellow Sign", and thought mixing gangsters with horror was well done in "One in Darkness". For "The Pale God", Bambra thought that anyone who had read Ramsey Campbell's short story Before the Storm "might find their enjoyment of the adventure marred as result." He saved his best compliments for the final adventure, "Bad Moon Rising", calling it "the star of the show. Like a full moon it shines brightly, and it includes some of the finest plot twists ever to appear in a shorter COC adventure." Bambra concluded that this book was "a useful addition to the COC range. The inclusion of “Bad Moon Rising” is reason enough to purchase this book. With the exception of “Still Waters,” the other adventures stand up well, making The Great Old Ones a good source of adventures for Keepers."

== Awards ==
- At the 1989 Origins Awards, The Great Old Ones won in the category ""Best Roleplaying Adventure."
