= Aerial Board of Control =

Fictional supranational organization created by Rudyard Kipling

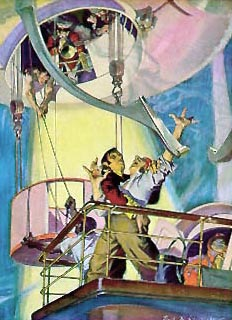
Rescue by a Planet dirigible liner, under supervision of A.B.C. North Banks Mark Boat (from "With the Night Mail")

The Aerial Board of Control is a fictional supranational organization dedicated to the control and aid of airship traffic across the whole world. It was first described in the science fiction novella by Rudyard Kipling "With the Night Mail" (1905), and later in "As Easy as ABC" (1912.)

== Description ==
"With the Night Mail", the first story about the Aerial Board of Control, is set in 2000 A.D. (Note: The initial publication in McClure's stated "2025" as the supposed date of publication, but the various dates were later reworked and Kipling settled on the year 2000 A.D.) By this date the Aerial Board of Control was established as an ad hoc working world organisation, much as the global arrangements of the General Post Office already had in Kipling's time, and with the aim of keeping national entanglements to a minimum for commerce and communication. Kipling envisages the Board as having a tight structure and hierarchical organisation, akin to a blend of the British Merchant Navy and the Post Office, with its world centre in London. It is described as "a massive [...] organization that controls the world’s air travel and usurps the power of individual nation-states".

In "With the Night Mail", Kipling described it as a "semi-elected, semi-nominated body of a few score persons of both sexes [that] controls this planet. 'Transportation is Civilization,' our motto runs. Theoretically, we do what we please so long as we do not interfere with the traffic and all it implies. Practically, the A.B.C. confirms or annuls all international arrangements and, to judge from its last report, finds our tolerant, humorous, lazy little planet only too ready to shift the whole burden of public administration on its shoulders."

Later the Board appeared in the long sequel story "As Easy as ABC", set in the year 2065 after a devastating plague. At this point the A.B.C. is effectively a reluctant and light-touch world government, though its mandate limits it to the protection of free trade and "all that may imply". Again, here Kipling took the opportunity to slightly revise elements of the earlier story.

== Publications ==
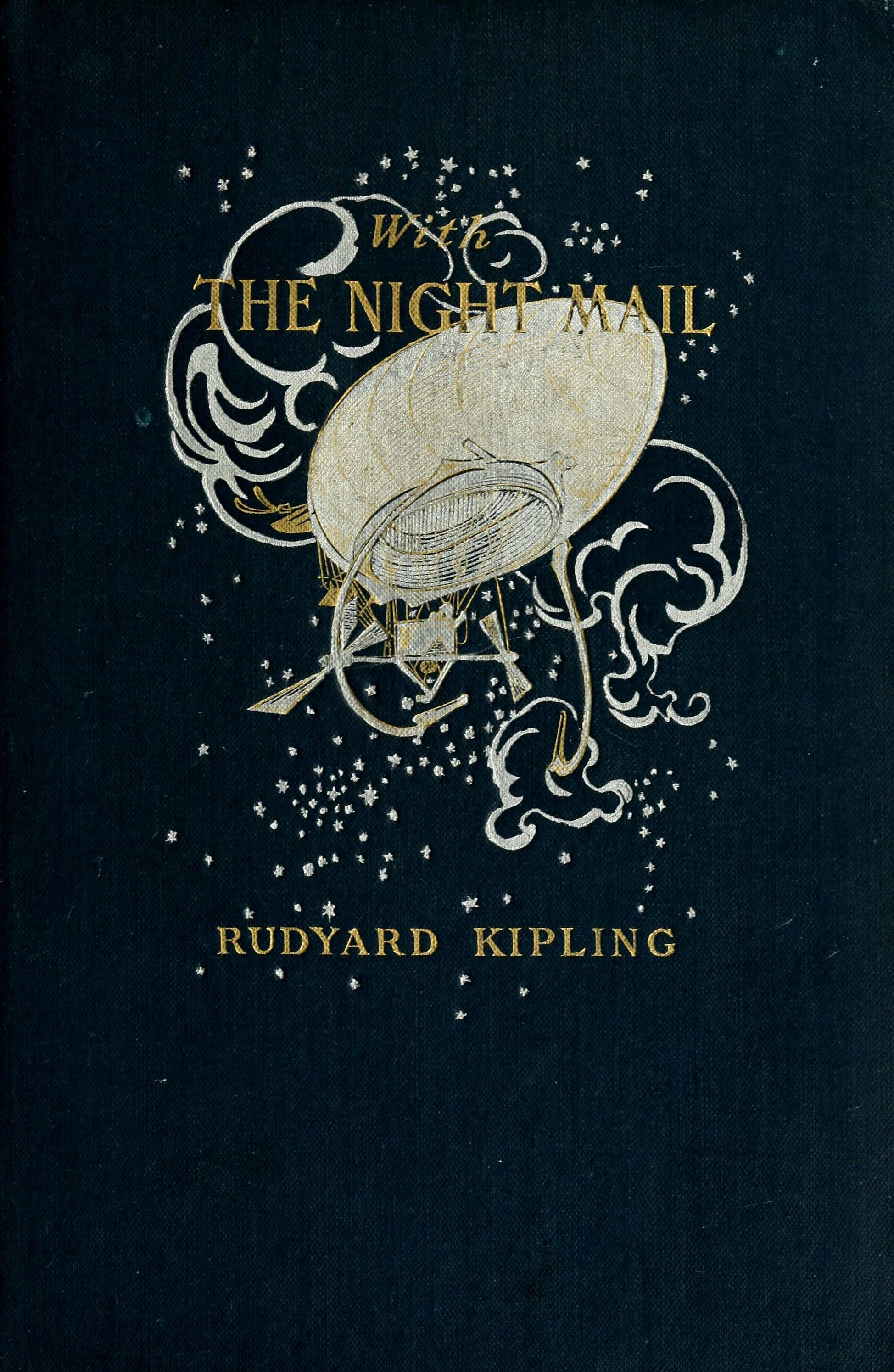
Cover of the 1909 book

"With the Night Mail" was published in McClure's Magazine in November 1905, and then in The Windsor Magazine in December 1905. In 1909 it was issued as a popular book, slightly revised and with additional poetry and faux advertisements and notices from the future. It later appeared in the Kipling story collection Actions and reactions (1915).

"As Easy as ABC" was published in The London Magazine 1912, but was drafted in 1907.

Kipling wrote only these two science fiction stories set in his Aerial Board of Control universe of the early 21st century. To date, no other author has followed his lead by creating more such tales.

The two stories were widely anthologised in the 20th century, for instance opening the major Gollancz anthology One Hundred Years of Science Fiction (1969).

Both stories are now in the public domain.

== Legacy ==
The Board of Space Control in the Venus Prime novels is inspired by both Kipling stories, and is mentioned in the afterword to the first book in the series, Breaking Strain by Arthur C. Clarke (whose short stories serve as the basis for each of the six novels, all written by Paul Preuss) as having done so, with Clarke saying that Kipling was the 'Clarke of the Air Age' for writing the stories about the ABC.
